= 1848–49 United States House of Representatives elections =

House elections for the 31st U.S. Congress

- August 7, 1848– November 6, 1849 (Note: Excluding special elections and states admitted after the start of Congress.)

All 233 seats (Note: Including late elections.) in the United States House of Representatives 117 seats needed for a majority
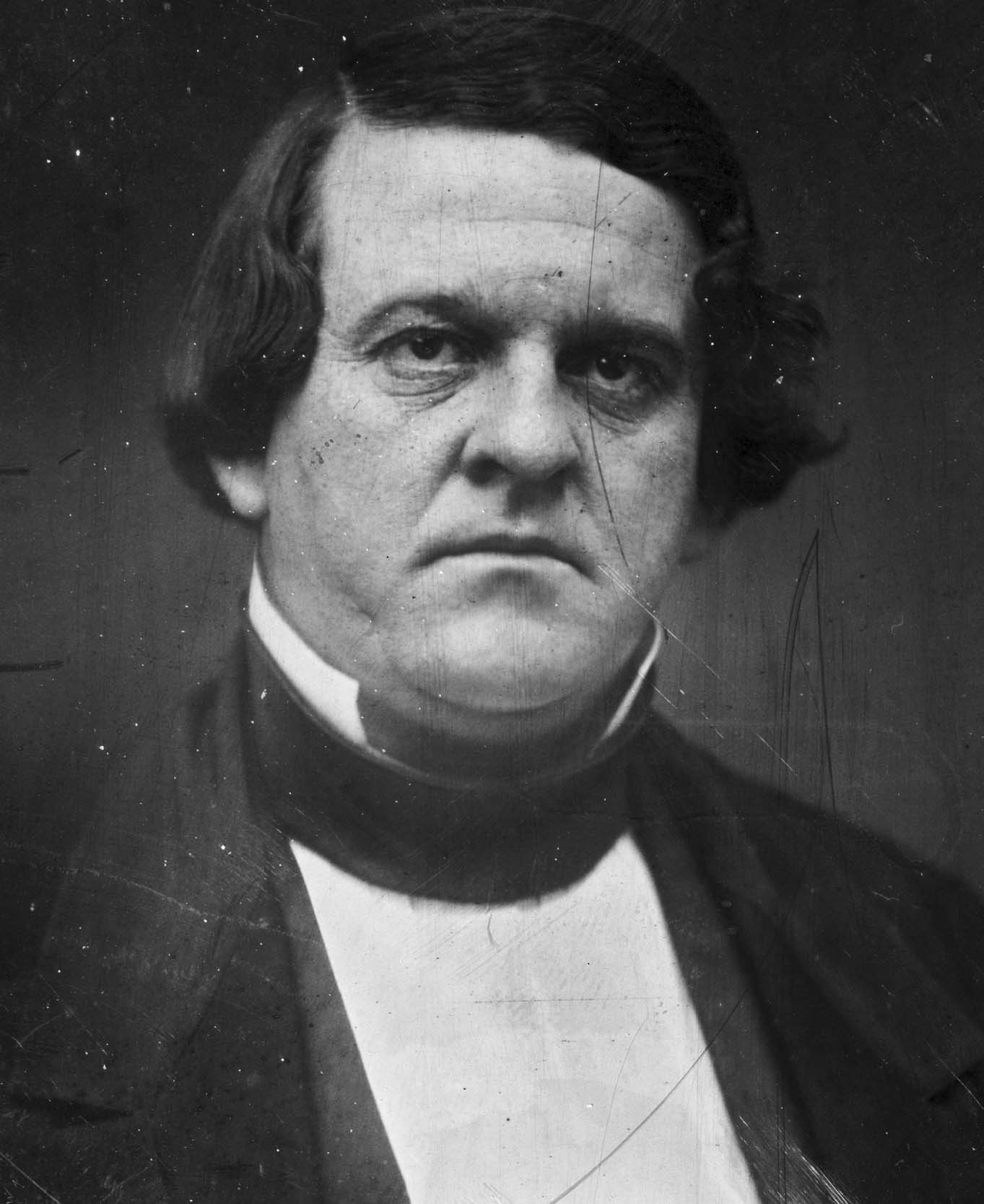

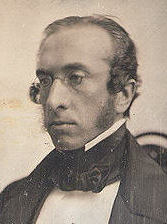
	First party	Second party
Leader	Howell Cobb	Robert C. Winthrop
Party	Democratic	Whig
Leader's seat	Georgia 6th	Massachusetts 1st
Last election	108 seats, 48.36%	116 seats, 44.72%
Seats won	113	107
Seat change	▲5	▼9
Popular vote	1,211,794	1,231,320
Percentage	44.11%	44.82%
Swing	▼4.25 pp	▲0.10 pp
	Third party	Fourth party
Party	Free Soil	Know Nothing
Last election	Pre-creation	1 seat, 1.26%
Seats won	8	1
Seat change	▲8	Steady
Popular vote	237,704	10,539
Percentage	8.65%	0.38%
Swing	New party	▼0.88 pp
	Fifth party
Party	Independent
Last election	3 seats (Note: Including 2 Independents and 1 Independent Democrat.), 2.09%
Seats won	1 (Note: Including 1 Anti-Rent Whig.)
Seat change	▼2
Popular vote	39,028
Percentage	1.42%
Swing	▼0.67 pp
Speaker before election
Robert C. Winthrop
Whig
Elected Speaker
Howell Cobb
Democratic

States held the 1848–49 United States House of Representatives elections between August 7, 1848, and November 11, 1849. Each state set a date for its elections to the House of Representatives before the first session of the 31st United States Congress convened on December 3, 1849. The new U.S. state of Wisconsin elected its first Representatives. Anticipating statehood, as ratified in September 1850, California held Federal elections beforehand, increasing the size of the House to 233 seats.

These elections spanned the 1848 United States presidential election and took place immediately after the U.S. victory over Mexico in the Mexican–American War. The Whigs lost their House majority as Democrats, whose support had driven the war, won a plurality. Among minor parties, the new Free Soil Party, which opposed slavery in the Western territories, won nine Northern seats, while the American or Know Nothing Party retained one.

Despite winning most of their seats at Whig expense, the Free Soil Party had coalesced in 1848 largely as a result of a Democratic Party split in New York, the most populous state. The new party thus drove an unusual Whig sweep in New York elections, temporarily masking Whig decline.

After a gold discovery in January 1848, California boomed, drawing rapid migration of new residents and creating immediate pressure for statehood. The Compromise of 1850, though largely crafted in the Senate, was also passed by the House, brokering its admission to the Union.

As no party held a majority when Congress convened, the election of a Speaker proved contentious. The Whigs were sectionally split, with Northern Whigs nominating incumbent speaker Robert C. Winthrop of Massachusetts and Southern Whigs supporting Meredith P. Gentry of Tennessee. Democrats primarily supported Howell Cobb of Georgia; 13 other Democratic hopefuls also garnered support. The small Free Soil Party supported David Wilmot of Pennsylvania, author of the Wilmot Proviso, calling attention to slave power's hold over both major parties.

After nearly three weeks of heated debate, the House suspended its majority rule for the Speaker election, enabling Cobb to be elected on the 63rd ballot by plurality.

== Results ==
↓
113	1	10	107
Democratic	(Note: 1 vacancy.)	(Note: 8 Free Soilers, 1 Know Nothing, 1 Anti-Rent Whig.)	Whig

State	Type	Date	Total seats	Democratic		Free Soil		Whig		Other	
State	Type	Date	Total seats	Seats	Change	Seats	Change	Seats	Change	Seats	Change
Arkansas	At-large	August 7, 1848	1	1	Steady	0	Steady	0	Steady	0	Steady
Illinois	District	August 7, 1848	7	5	▲1	0	Steady	1	Steady	0	▼1
Iowa	District	August 7, 1848	2	2	Steady	0	Steady	0	Steady	0	Steady
Missouri	District	August 7, 1848	5	5	Steady	0	Steady	0	Steady	0	Steady
Vermont	District	September 5, 1848	4	1	Steady	0	Steady	3	Steady	0	Steady
Maine	District	September 11, 1848	7	5	▼1	0	Steady	2	▲1	0	Steady
Florida	At-large	October 2, 1848	1	0	Steady	0	Steady	1	Steady	0	Steady
Georgia	District	October 2, 1848	8	4	Steady	0	Steady	4	Steady	0	Steady
South Carolina	District	October 9–10, 1848	7	7	Steady	0	Steady	0	Steady	0	Steady
Ohio	District	October 10, 1848	21	11	▲1	2	▲2	8	▼3	0	Steady
Pennsylvania	District	October 10, 1848	24	10	▲3	0	Steady	13	▼3	1 (Note: 1 Know Nothing)	Steady
Delaware	At-large	November 6, 1848	1	0	Steady	0	Steady	1	Steady	0	Steady
Michigan	District	November 7, 1848 (Election Day) (Note: In 1845, Congress passed a law providing for a uniform date for choosing presidential electors (see: Statutes at Large, 28th Congress, 2nd Session, p. 721). Congressional elections were unaffected by this law, but the date was gradually adopted by the states for congressional elections as well.)	3	2	▼1	0	Steady	1	▲1	0	Steady
New Jersey	District	November 7, 1848 (Election Day)	5	1	Steady	0	Steady	4	Steady	0	Steady
New York	District	November 7, 1848 (Election Day)	34	1	▼9	1	▲1	31	▲8	1	Steady
Wisconsin	District	November 7, 1848 (Election Day)	3 (Note: Increase of 1 seat.)	1	▼1	1	▲1	1	▲1	0	Steady
Massachusetts	District	November 13, 1848	10 (Note: One vacancy, in Massachusetts's 4th district, for the duration of the 31st Congress (as no candidate received a majority of the vote after multiple elections).)	0	Steady	1	▲1	8	▼2	0	Steady
Late elections, after the March 4, 1849 beginning of the term
New Hampshire	District	March 13, 1849	4	2	Steady	1	▲1	1	Steady	0	▼1 (Note: Previous election had 1 Independent.)
Connecticut	District	April 2, 1849	4	2	▲2	1	▲1	1	▼3	0	Steady
Rhode Island	District	April 4, 1849	2	0	▼1	0	Steady	2	▲1	0	Steady
Virginia	District	April 26, 1849	15	13	▲4	0	Steady	2	▼4	0	Steady
Tennessee	District	August 2, 1849	11	7	▲1	0	Steady	4	▼1	0	Steady
Alabama	District	August 6, 1849	7	5	Steady	0	Steady	2	Steady	0	Steady
Indiana	District	August 6, 1849	10	8	▲2	1	▲1	1	▼3	0	Steady
Kentucky	District	August 6, 1849	10	4	Steady	0	Steady	6	Steady	0	Steady
Texas	District	August 6, 1849	2	2	Steady	0	Steady	0	Steady	0	Steady
North Carolina	District	August 7, 1849	9	3	Steady	0	Steady	6	Steady	0	Steady
Maryland	District	October 3, 1849	6	3	▲1	0	Steady	3	▼1	0	Steady
Louisiana	District	November 5, 1849	4	3	Steady	0	Steady	1	Steady	0	Steady
Mississippi	District	November 5–6, 1849	4	4	▲1	0	Steady	0	▼1	0	Steady
California	At-large	November 11, 1849	2 (Note: The representatives from California were not seated until September 9, 1850, after the start of Congress.)	1	▲1	0	Steady	0	Steady	1 (Note: Independent politician)	▲1
Total			231 (Note: One seat was vacant as a result of a failed election in Massachusetts's 4th congressional district. Two representatives from California were not seated until September 9, 1850, increasing the size of the House to 233 seats.)	113 48.9%	▲3	8 3.4%	▲8	107 46.3%	▼9	2 0.9%	Steady

Popular vote
Whig	44.84%
Democratic	44.16%
Free Soil	8.66%
Independent	1.76%
Know Nothing	0.38%
Others	0.20%

House seats
Democratic	48.92%
Whig	46.32%
Free Soil	3.46%
Anti-Rent Whig	0.43%
Know Nothing	0.43%
Vacant	0.43%

== New seats ==
An additional seat was apportioned to Wisconsin. Two seats were allocated to California upon its admission on September 9, 1850, increasing the size of the House to 233 seats.

== Special elections ==
=== 30th Congress ===
District	Incumbent			This race	
District	Member / Delegate	Party	First elected	Results	Candidates
Pennsylvania 6	John W. Hornbeck	Whig	1846	Incumbent died January 16, 1848. New member elected February 23, 1848. Democratic gain. Winner was not a candidate for the next term; see below.	▌ ✓ Samuel Augustus Bridges (Democratic) 50.5%; ▌Lester Trexler (Whig) 49.5%
Massachusetts 8	John Quincy Adams	Whig	1830	Incumbent died February 23, 1848. New member elected April 3, 1848. Whig hold. Winner later re-elected to the next term; see below.	▌ ✓ Horace Mann (Whig) 60.1%; ▌Edgar K. Whitaker (Democratic) 26.9%; ▌Appleton Howe (Liberty) 13.0%
South Carolina 1	James A. Black	Democratic	1843	Incumbent died April 3, 1848. New member elected May 23, 1848. Democratic hold. Winner later re-elected to the next term; see below.	▌ ✓ Daniel Wallace (Democratic) 36.9%; ▌H. F. Thompson (Unknown) 36.8%; ▌W. F. Davie (Unknown) 26.3%
Wisconsin Territory at-large	John Hubbard Tweedy	Whig	1846	Incumbent resigned May 28, 1848, after Wisconsin became a state. New delegate elected October 30, 1848. Democratic gain. Winner later re-elected in the Minnesota Territory's at-large district; see below.	▌ ✓ Henry Hastings Sibley (Democratic) 62.6%; ▌Henry M. Rice (Democratic) 32.4%; ▌Socrates Nelson (Democratic) 5.0%
New York 6	David S. Jackson	Democratic	1846	Seat declared vacant on April 19, 1848, following an election contest centered on voter fraud. New member elected November 7, 1848. Whig gain. Winner not elected the same day to the next term; see below.	▌ ✓ Horace Greeley (Whig) 53.7%; ▌John M. Bradhurst (Democratic) 36.9%; ▌John Townsend (Free Soil) 9.1%; ▌James Monroe (Ind. Whig) 0.3%
New York 27	John M. Holley	Whig	1846	Incumbent died March 8, 1848. New member elected November 7, 1848. Whig hold. Winner not elected the same day to the next term; see below.	▌ ✓ Esbon Blackmar (Whig) 45.6%; ▌James C. Smith (Free Soil) 40.9%; ▌Cullen Foster (Democratic) 13.5%
South Carolina 4	Alexander D. Sims	Democratic	1844	Incumbent died November 22, 1848. New member elected January 9, 1849. Democratic hold. Winner later re-elected to the next term; see below.	▌ ✓ John McQueen (Democratic) 62.7%; ▌Robert Munroe (Unknown) 37.3%

=== 31st Congress ===
District	Incumbent			This race	
District	Member	Party	First elected	Results	Candidates
South Carolina 4	Alexander D. Sims	Democratic	1844	Incumbent had been re-elected, see below, but died November 22, 1848. New member elected January 16, 1849. Democratic hold. Winner had already been elected to finish the current term; see above.	▌ ✓ John McQueen (Democratic) 62.5%; ▌Robert Munroe (Unknown) 37.5%
Vermont 3	George P. Marsh	Whig	1843	Incumbent resigned May 29, 1849, when appointed U.S. Minister Resident to the Ottoman Empire. New member elected September 4, 1849. Whig hold. Winner later re-elected to the next term.	▌ ✓ James Meacham (Whig) 54.5%; ▌Asahel Peck (Free Soil) 38.7%; ▌Giles Harrington (Democratic) 6.8%
Ohio 6	Rodolphus Dickinson	Democratic	1846	Incumbent died March 20, 1849. New member elected October 9, 1849. Democratic hold. Winner died the following year, leading to another special election.	▌ ✓ Amos E. Wood (Democratic) 86.6%; ▌D. B. White (Unknown) 13.4%
Virginia 15	Alexander Newman	Democratic	1849	Incumbent died September 8, 1849. New member elected November 8, 1849. Whig gain. Winner later lost re-election to the next term.	▌ ✓ Thomas Haymond (Whig) 50.5%; ▌George W. Thompson (Democratic) 49.5%

== Alabama ==
Elections were held August 6, 1849, after the March 4, 1849 beginning of the term, but before the House first convened in December 1849.

District	Incumbent			This race	
District	Member	Party	First elected	Results	Candidates
Alabama 1	John Gayle	Whig	1847	Incumbent retired. Whig hold.	▌ ✓ William J. Alston (Whig) 51.2%; ▌C.C. Sellers (Democratic) 48.8%
Alabama 2	Henry W. Hilliard	Whig	1845	Incumbent re-elected.	▌ ✓ Henry W. Hilliard (Whig) 53.1%; ▌James L. Pugh (Ind. Whig) 46.9%
Alabama 3	Sampson Willis Harris	Democratic	1847	Incumbent re-elected.	▌ ✓ Sampson Willis Harris (Democratic) 52.6%; ▌Jonathan S. Hunter (Whig) 47.4%
Alabama 4	Samuel Williams Inge	Democratic	1847	Incumbent re-elected.	▌ ✓ Samuel Williams Inge (Democratic) 52.4%; ▌Jonathan S. Hunter (Whig) 47.6%
Alabama 5	George S. Houston	Democratic	1841	Incumbent retired. Democratic hold.	▌ ✓ David Hubbard (Democratic) 49.1%; ▌[FNU] Wood (Whig) 30.1%; ▌Edward A. O'Neal (Democratic) 17.8%
Alabama 6	Williamson R. W. Cobb	Democratic	1847	Incumbent re-elected.	▌ ✓ Williamson R. W. Cobb (Democratic) 53.9%; ▌Jere Clemens (Whig) 46.1%
Alabama 7	Franklin W. Bowdon	Democratic	1846 (special)	Incumbent re-elected.	▌ ✓ Franklin W. Bowdon (Democratic) 55.1%%; ▌[FNU] Bradford (Whig) 44.9%

== Arkansas ==
The election was held August 7, 1848.

District	Incumbent			This race	
District	Member	Party	First elected	Results	Candidates
Arkansas at-large	Robert Ward Johnson	Democratic	1846	Incumbent re-elected.	▌ ✓ Robert Ward Johnson (Democratic) 60.8%; ▌Thomas Willoughby Newton (Whig) 39.2%

== California ==
In California two at-large members were elected November 13, 1849 in anticipation of statehood and seated September 11, 1850.

District	Incumbent			This race	
District	Member	Party	First elected	Results	Candidates
California at-large 2 seats elected on a general ticket	None (new state)			New seat. Independent gain.	▌ ✓ George W. Wright (Independent) 22.0%; ▌ ✓ Edward Gilbert (Democratic) 20.6%; ▌Rodman M. Price (Democratic) 16.3%; ▌P. A. Morse (Unknown) 8.3%; ▌Lewis Dent (Unknown) 8.2%; ▌E. J. C. Kewen (Unknown) 7.3%; ▌W. M. Sheppard (Unknown) 7.2%; ▌William E. Shannon (Unknown) 5.4%; Others: ▌Peter Halsted (Unknown) 2.4%; ▌L. W. Hastings (Unknown) 0.9%; ▌Pierson B. Reading (Whig) 0.7%; ▌W. H. Russell (Unknown) 0.4%; ▌J. S. Thompson (Unknown) 0.3%; ▌Kimball H. Dimmick (Unknown) 0.2%
California at-large 2 seats elected on a general ticket	None (new state)			New seat. Democratic gain.	▌ ✓ George W. Wright (Independent) 22.0%; ▌ ✓ Edward Gilbert (Democratic) 20.6%; ▌Rodman M. Price (Democratic) 16.3%; ▌P. A. Morse (Unknown) 8.3%; ▌Lewis Dent (Unknown) 8.2%; ▌E. J. C. Kewen (Unknown) 7.3%; ▌W. M. Sheppard (Unknown) 7.2%; ▌William E. Shannon (Unknown) 5.4%; Others: ▌Peter Halsted (Unknown) 2.4%; ▌L. W. Hastings (Unknown) 0.9%; ▌Pierson B. Reading (Whig) 0.7%; ▌W. H. Russell (Unknown) 0.4%; ▌J. S. Thompson (Unknown) 0.3%; ▌Kimball H. Dimmick (Unknown) 0.2%

== Connecticut ==
Elections were held April 2, 1849, after the March 4, 1849 beginning of the term, but before the House first convened in December 1849.

District	Incumbent			This race	
District	Member	Party	First elected	Results	Candidates
Connecticut 1	James Dixon	Whig	1845	Incumbent retired. Democratic gain.	▌ ✓ Loren P. Waldo (Democratic) 50.3%; ▌Charles Chapman (Whig) 49.5%
Connecticut 2	Samuel D. Hubbard	Whig	1845	Incumbent lost re-election. Free Soil gain.	▌ ✓ Walter Booth (Free Soil) 50.0%; ▌James F. Babcock (Whig) 49.0%; ▌Samuel D. Hubbard (Unknown) 0.9%
Connecticut 3	John A. Rockwell	Whig	1845	Incumbent lost re-election. Democratic gain.	▌ ✓ Chauncey F. Cleveland (Democratic) 50.5%; ▌John A. Rockwell (Whig) 49.3%; ▌Increase Wilson (Free Soil) 0.2%
Connecticut 4	Truman Smith	Whig	1839; 1843 (retired); 1845	Incumbent retired to run for U.S. Senate. Whig hold.	▌ ✓ Thomas B. Butler (Whig) 51.4%; ▌Nathaniel H. Wildman (Democratic) 44.4%; ▌Barstow F. White (Free Soil) 4.1%

== Delaware ==
The election was held November 6, 1848.

District	Incumbent			This race	
District	Member	Party	First elected	Results	Candidates
Delaware at-large	John W. Houston	Whig	1844	Incumbent re-elected.	▌ ✓ John W. Houston (Whig) 51.4%; ▌William G. Whiteley (Democratic) 48.6%

== Florida ==
Florida's single at-large member was elected October 2, 1848.

District	Incumbent			This race	
District	Member	Party	First elected	Results	Candidates
Florida at-large	Edward C. Cabell	Whig	1845 (special); 1846 (lost contest); 1846	Incumbent re-elected.	▌ ✓ Edward C. Cabell (Whig) 53.5%; ▌William Pope Duval (Democratic) 46.5%

== Georgia ==
Elections were held October 2, 1848.

District	Incumbent			This race	
District	Member	Party	First elected	Results	Candidates
Georgia 1	T. Butler King	Whig	1838; 1842 (lost); 1844	Incumbent re-elected.	▌ ✓ T. Butler King (Whig) 57.0%; ▌Joseph W. Jackson (Democratic) 43.0%
Georgia 2	Alfred Iverson Sr.	Democratic	1846	Incumbent retired. Democratic hold.	▌ ✓ Marshall Johnson Wellborn (Democratic) 50.3%; ▌James Calhoun (Whig) 49.7%
Georgia 3	John William Jones	Whig	1846	Incumbent retired. Whig hold.	▌ ✓ Allen F. Owen (Whig) 52.7%; ▌John I. Carey (Democratic) 47.3%
Georgia 4	Hugh A. Haralson	Democratic	1842	Incumbent re-elected.	▌ ✓ Hugh A. Haralson (Democratic) 50.9%; ▌John A. Williamson (Whig) 49.1%
Georgia 5	John H. Lumpkin	Democratic	1842	Incumbent retired. Democratic hold.	▌ ✓ Thomas C. Hackett (Democratic) 59.8%; ▌James Calhoun (Whig) 40.2%
Georgia 6	Howell Cobb	Democratic	1842	Incumbent re-elected.	▌ ✓ Howell Cobb (Democratic) 57.7%; ▌James W. Harris (Whig) 42.3%
Georgia 7	Alexander H. Stephens	Whig	1843 (special)	Incumbent re-elected.	▌ ✓ Alexander H. Stephens (Whig) 60.7%; ▌Joseph Day (Democratic) 39.3%
Georgia 8	Robert Toombs	Whig	1844	Incumbent re-elected.	▌ ✓ Robert Toombs (Whig) 62.4%; ▌A.J. Lawson (Democratic) 37.6%

== Illinois ==
Elections were held August 7, 1848.

District	Incumbent			This race	
District	Member	Party	First elected	Results	Candidates
Illinois 1	Robert Smith	Independent; Democratic	1842 (Note: Smith was first elected as a Democrat but won re-election in 1846 as an Independent Democrat.)	Incumbent retired. Democratic gain.	▌ ✓ William Henry Bissell (Democratic) 97.7%; ▌Charles W. Hunter (Liberty) 2.3%
Illinois 2	John Alexander McClernand	Democratic	1842	Incumbent re-elected.	▌ ✓ John Alexander McClernand (Democratic) 65.0%; ▌Samuel Marshall (Whig) 35.0%
Illinois 3	Orlando B. Ficklin	Democratic	1842	Incumbent retired. Democratic hold.	▌ ✓ Timothy R. Young (Democratic) 61.4%; ▌George M. Hanson (Whig) 38.6%
Illinois 4	John Wentworth	Democratic	1842	Incumbent re-elected.	▌ ✓ John Wentworth (Democratic) 50.9%; ▌J. Young Scammon (Whig) 35.6%; ▌Owen Lovejoy (Free Soil) 13.5%
Illinois 5	William Alexander Richardson	Democratic	1847 (special)	Incumbent re-elected.	▌ ✓ William Alexander Richardson (Democratic) 96.6%; ▌Eli Wilson (Free Soil) 3.4%
Illinois 6	Thomas J. Turner	Democratic	1846	Incumbent retired. Whig gain.	▌ ✓ Edward D. Baker (Whig) 50.9%; ▌Joseph Wells (Democratic) 45.8%; ▌Joseph Call (Free Soil) 3.3%
Illinois 7	Abraham Lincoln	Whig	1846	Incumbent retired. Democratic gain.	▌ ✓ Thomas L. Harris (Democratic) 49.8%; ▌Stephen T. Logan (Whig) 49.1%; ▌E. Wright (Free Soil) 1.1%

== Indiana ==
Elections were held August 10, 1849, after the March 4, 1849 beginning of the term, but before the House first convened in December 1849.

District	Incumbent			This race	
District	Member	Party	First elected	Results	Candidates
Indiana 1	Elisha Embree	Whig	1847	Incumbent lost re-election. Democratic gain.	▌ ✓ Nathaniel Albertson (Democratic) 52.1%; ▌Elisha Embree (Whig) 47.9%
Indiana 2	Thomas J. Henley	Democratic	1843	Incumbent retired. Democratic hold.	▌ ✓ Cyrus L. Dunham (Democratic) 51.6%; ▌William McKee Dunn (Whig) 48.4%
Indiana 3	John L. Robinson	Democratic	1847	Incumbent re-elected.	▌ ✓ John L. Robinson (Democratic) 52.5%; ▌Joseph Robinson (Whig) 47.5%
Indiana 4	Caleb B. Smith	Whig	1843	Incumbent retired. Free Soil gain.	▌ ✓ George W. Julian (Free Soil) 50.8%; ▌Samuel W. Parker (Whig) 49.2%
Indiana 5	William W. Wick	Democratic	1839; 1841 (retired); 1845	Incumbent retired. Democratic hold.	▌ ✓ William J. Brown (Democratic) 54.7%; ▌William Herod (Whig) 45.3%
Indiana 6	George G. Dunn	Whig	1847	Incumbent retired. Democratic gain.	▌ ✓ Willis A. Gorman (Democratic) 54.1%; ▌John Sebrie Watts (Whig) 45.9%
Indiana 7	Richard W. Thompson	Whig	1841; 1843 (retired); 1847	Incumbent renominated but withdrew. Whig hold.	▌ ✓ Edward W. McGaughey (Whig) 58.0%; ▌Gratton F. Cookerly (Democratic) 42.0%
Indiana 8	John Pettit	Democratic	1843	Incumbent lost renomination. Democratic hold.	▌ ✓ Joseph E. McDonald (Democratic) 51.2%; ▌Henry S. Lane (Whig) 48.8%
Indiana 9	Charles W. Cathcart	Democratic	1845	Incumbent retired. Democratic hold.	▌ ✓ Graham N. Fitch (Democratic) 50.8%; ▌Williamson Wright (Whig) 49.2%
Indiana 10	William R. Rockhill	Democratic	1847	Incumbent retired. Democratic hold.	▌ ✓ Andrew J. Harlan (Democratic) 52.1%; ▌David Kilgore (Whig) 47.9%

== Iowa ==
Elections were held August 7, 1848.

District	Incumbent			This race	
District	Member	Party	First elected	Results	Candidates
Iowa 1	William Thompson	Democratic	1847	Incumbent re-elected.	▌ ✓ William Thompson (Democratic) 50.3%; ▌Daniel F. Miller (Whig) 47.3%; ▌Samuel L. Howe (Free Soil) 2.4%
Iowa 2	Shepherd Leffler	Democratic	1846	Incumbent re-elected.	▌ ✓ Shepherd Leffler (Democratic) 50.9%; ▌Timothy Davis (Whig) 47.5%; ▌James Dawson (Free Soil) 1.6%

== Kentucky ==
Elections were held August 6, 1849, after the March 4, 1849 beginning of the term, but before the House first convened in December 1849.

District	Incumbent			This race	
District	Member	Party	First elected	Results	Candidates
Kentucky 1	Linn Boyd	Democratic	1835; 1837 (lost); 1839	Incumbent re-elected.	▌ ✓ Linn Boyd (Democratic); Unopposed
Kentucky 2	Samuel Peyton	Democratic	1847	Incumbent retired. Whig gain.	▌ ✓ James Leeper Johnson (Whig) 67.4%; ▌Francis Peyton (Democratic) 32.6%
Kentucky 3	Beverly L. Clarke	Democratic	1847	Incumbent retired. Whig gain.	▌ ✓ Finis McLean (Whig); Unopposed
Kentucky 4	Aylette Buckner	Whig	1847	Incumbent lost re-election. Democratic gain.	▌ ✓ George Caldwell (Democratic) 54.6%; ▌Aylette Buckner (Whig) 45.4%
Kentucky 5	John Burton Thompson	Whig	1840 (special); 1843 (retired); 1847	Incumbent re-elected.	▌ ✓ John Burton Thompson (Whig); Unopposed
Kentucky 6	Green Adams	Whig	1847	Incumbent retired. Whig hold.	▌ ✓ Daniel Breck (Whig) 54.7%; ▌John Preston Martin (Democratic) 45.3%
Kentucky 7	Garnett Duncan	Whig	1847	Incumbent retired. Whig hold.	▌ ✓ Humphrey Marshall (Whig) 50.3%; ▌Newton Lane (Democratic) 49.7%
Kentucky 8	Charles S. Morehead	Whig	1847	Incumbent re-elected.	▌ ✓ Charles S. Morehead (Whig) 52.7%; ▌Newton Lane (Know Nothing) 47.3%
Kentucky 9	Richard French	Democratic	1835; 1837 (lost); 1843; 1845 (lost); 1847	Incumbent retired. Democratic hold.	▌ ✓ John Calvin Mason (Democratic) 52.8%; ▌John B. Houston (Whig) 47.2%
Kentucky 10	John P. Gaines	Whig	1847	Incumbent lost re-election. Democratic gain.	▌ ✓ Richard H. Stanton (Democratic) 51.2%; ▌John P. Gaines (Whig) 48.8%

== Louisiana ==
Elections were held November 5, 1849, after the March 4, 1849 beginning of the term, but before the House first convened in December 1849.

District	Incumbent			This race	
District	Member	Party	First elected	Results	Candidates
Louisiana 1	Emile La Sére	Democratic	1846 (special)	Incumbent re-elected.	▌ ✓ Emile La Sére (Democratic) 56.3%; ▌O. P. Jackson (Whig) 43.7%
Louisiana 2	Bannon G. Thibodeaux	Whig	1844	Incumbent retired. Whig hold.	▌ ✓ Charles Magill Conrad (Whig) 52.4%; ▌J. C. Beatty (Democratic) 47.6%
Louisiana 3	John H. Harmanson	Democratic	1845 (special)	Incumbent re-elected.	▌ ✓ John H. Harmanson (Democratic) 54.8%; ▌R. A. Stewart (Whig) 45.2%
Louisiana 4	Isaac E. Morse	Democratic	1844 (special)	Incumbent re-elected.	▌ ✓ Isaac E. Morse (Democratic) 53.1%; ▌[FNU] Waddell (Whig) 46.9%

== Maine ==
Elections were held September 11, 1848.

District	Incumbent			This race	
District	Member	Party	First elected	Results	Candidates
Maine 1	David Hammons	Democratic	1846	Incumbent retired. Democratic hold.	▌ ✓ Elbridge Gerry (Democratic) 55.0%; ▌John Jameson (Whig) 37.2%; ▌David Gerry (Free Soil) 7.8%
Maine 2	Asa Clapp	Democratic	1847	Incumbent retired. Democratic hold.	▌ ✓ Nathaniel Littlefield (Democratic) 46.9%; ▌Isaac Lincoln (Whig) 40.0%; ▌William P. Fessenden (Free Soil) 13.1%
Maine 3	Hiram Belcher	Whig	1846	Incumbent retired. Whig hold.	▌ ✓ John Otis (Whig) 44.2%; ▌Moses Sherburne (Democratic) 34.6%; ▌Ezekiel Holmes (Free Soil) 21.2%
Maine 4	Franklin Clark	Democratic	1847	Incumbent lost re-election. Whig gain.	▌ ✓ Rufus K. Goodenow (Whig) 49.5%; ▌John D. McCrate (Democratic) 42.1%; ▌William H. Vinton (Free Soil) 7.3%; ▌Franklin Clark (Democratic) 1.1%
Maine 5	Ephraim K. Smart	Democratic	1847	Incumbent retired. Democratic hold.	▌ ✓ Cullen Sawtelle (Democratic) 51.0%; ▌Abner Coburn (Whig) 31.1%; ▌Cyrus Fletcher (Free Soil) 17.9%
Maine 6	James S. Wiley	Democratic	1847	Incumbent retired. Democratic hold.	▌ ✓ Charles Stetson (Democratic) 40.8%; ▌Israel Washburn Jr. (Whig) 36.0%; ▌Jeremiah Curtis (Free Soil) 16.4%; ▌Samuel Veazie (Democratic) 6.8%
Maine 7	Hezekiah Williams	Democratic	1844	Incumbent retired. Democratic hold.	▌ ✓ Thomas J. D. Fuller (Democratic) 54.1%; ▌George Downes (Whig) 39.8%; ▌Tristram Redman (Free Soil) 6.2%

== Maryland ==
Elections were held October 3, 1849 elections were after the March 4, 1849 beginning of the new term, but still before the Congress convened in December 1849.

District	Incumbent			This race	
District	Member	Party	First elected	Results	Candidates
Maryland 1	John G. Chapman	Whig	1845	Incumbent retired. Whig hold.	▌ ✓ Richard Bowie (Whig) 90.5%; ▌Jesse Garner (Unknown) 6.7%; ▌[FNU] Stoddard (Unknown) 2.8%
Maryland 2	James Dixon Roman	Whig	1847	Incumbent retired. Democratic gain.	▌ ✓ William T. Hamilton (Democratic) 50.4%; ▌Thomas J. McKaig (Whig) 49.6%
Maryland 3	Thomas Watkins Ligon	Democratic	1845	Incumbent retired. Democratic hold.	▌ ✓ Edward Hammond (Democratic) 60.8%; ▌George W. Gray (Whig) 39.2%
Maryland 4	Robert Milligan McLane	Democratic	1847	Incumbent re-elected.	▌ ✓ Robert Milligan McLane (Democratic) 53.5%; ▌John Reese Kenly (Whig) 46.5%
Maryland 5	Alexander Evans	Whig	1847	Incumbent re-elected.	▌ ✓ Alexander Evans (Whig) 52.6%; ▌S. W. Magraw (Democratic) 47.4%
Maryland 6	John W. Crisfield	Whig	1847	Incumbent retired. Whig hold.	▌ ✓ John Bozman Kerr (Whig) 99.4%; Scattering 0.6%

== Massachusetts ==
Elections were held November 13, 1848.

District	Incumbent			This race	
District	Member	Party	First elected	Results	Candidates
Massachusetts 1	Robert C. Winthrop	Whig	1840 (special); 1842 (resigned); 1842 (special)	Incumbent re-elected.	▌ ✓ Robert C. Winthrop (Whig) 67.0%; ▌Charles Sumner (Free Soil) 20.3%; ▌Benjamin F. Hallett (Democratic) 12.7%
Massachusetts 2	Daniel P. King	Whig	1843	Incumbent re-elected.	First ballot (November 13, 1848): ▌Daniel P. King (Whig) 45.3%; ▌Caleb Stetson (Free Soil) 29.3%; ▌Robert Rantoul Jr. (Democratic) 25.4%; Second ballot (January 1, 1849): ▌ ✓ Daniel P. King (Whig) 54.6%; ▌Benjamin F. Newhall (Free Soil) 24.8%; ▌Robert Rantoul Jr. (Democratic) 20.6%
Massachusetts 3	Amos Abbott	Whig	1844 (late)	Incumbent retired. Whig hold.	▌ ✓ James H. Duncan (Whig) 53.1%; ▌Chauncey L. Knapp (Free Soil) 24.1%; ▌George S. Boutwell (Democratic) 22.8%
Massachusetts 4	John G. Palfrey	Whig	1846	Incumbent lost re-election as Free Soil candidate. No member elected due to failure to achieve majority vote. Whig loss.	First ballot (November 13, 1848): ▌John G. Palfrey (Free Soil) 38.5%; ▌Benjamin Thompson (Whig) 38.2%; ▌Frederick Robinson (Democratic) 23.3%; Second ballot (January 1, 1849): ▌John G. Palfrey (Free Soil) 49.3%; ▌Benjamin Thompson (Whig) 34.0%; ▌Frederick Robinson (Democratic) 16.7%; Third ballot (March 5, 1849): ▌John G. Palfrey (Free Soil) 47.7%; ▌Benjamin Thompson (Whig) 33.8%; ▌Frederick Robinson (Democratic) 18.5%; Fourth ballot (June 11, 1849): ▌John G. Palfrey (Free Soil) 47.8%; ▌Benjamin Thompson (Whig) 36.1%; ▌Frederick Robinson (Democratic) 16.1%; Fifth ballot (September 10, 1849): ▌John G. Palfrey (Free Soil) 46.9%; ▌Benjamin Thompson (Whig) 36.8%; ▌Frederick Robinson (Democratic) 16.3%; Sixth ballot (November 12, 1849): ▌Benjamin Thompson (Whig) 40.0%; ▌John G. Palfrey (Free Soil) 35.9%; ▌Frederick Robinson (Democratic) 24.1%; Seventh ballot (January 21, 1850): ▌Benjamin Thompson (Whig) 43.7%; ▌John G. Palfrey (Free Soil) 37.9%; ▌Frederick Robinson (Democratic) 18.4%; Eighth ballot (March 4, 1850): ▌Benjamin Thompson (Whig) 41.2%; ▌John G. Palfrey (Free Soil) 38.5%; ▌Frederick Robinson (Democratic) 20.3%; Ninth ballot (May 27, 1850): ▌John G. Palfrey (Free Soil) 47.6%; ▌Benjamin Thompson (Whig) 44.6%; ▌Richard Frothingham Jr. (Democratic) 3.0%; ▌Bowen Buckman (Democratic) 1.8%; Scattering 1.5%; ▌Nathaniel P. Banks (Democratic) 1.0%; ▌James Russell (Democratic) 0.5%; Tenth ballot (August 19, 1850): ▌John G. Palfrey (Free Soil) 42.6%; ▌Benjamin Thompson (Whig) 41.4%; ▌Richard Frothingham Jr. (Democratic) 16.0%; Eleventh ballot (November 11, 1850): ▌Benjamin Thompson (Whig) 39.4%; ▌John G. Palfrey (Free Soil) 34.7%; ▌Richard Frothingham Jr. (Democratic) 25.9%; Twelfth ballot (January 20, 1851): ▌Benjamin Thompson (Whig) 42.7%; ▌John G. Palfrey (Free Soil) 34.1%; ▌Richard Frothingham Jr. (Democratic) 23.2%
Massachusetts 5	Charles Hudson	Whig	1841 (special)	Incumbent lost re-election. Free Soil gain.	First ballot (November 13, 1848): ▌Charles Allen (Free Soil) 47.4%; ▌Charles Hudson (Whig) 30.8%; ▌Isaac Davis (Democratic) 21.8%; Second ballot (January 1, 1849): ▌ ✓ Charles Allen (Free Soil) 58.9%; ▌Charles Hudson (Whig) 28.9%; ▌Robert Rantoul Jr. (Democratic) 12.2%
Massachusetts 6	George Ashmun	Whig	1844	Incumbent re-elected.	▌ ✓ George Ashmun (Whig) 52.3%; ▌Muhling Griswold (Democratic) 27.9%; ▌Daniel W. Atwood (Free Soil) 19.8%
Massachusetts 7	Julius Rockwell	Whig	1844 (late)	Incumbent re-elected.	▌ ✓ Julius Rockwell (Whig) 51.4%; ▌Thomas F. Plunkett (Democratic) 28.2%; ▌Charles Sedgwick (Free Soil) 20.4%
Massachusetts 8	Horace Mann	Whig	1848 (special)	Incumbent re-elected.	▌ ✓ Horace Mann (Whig) 84.5%; ▌Bradford L. Wales (Democratic) 15.5%
Massachusetts 9	Artemas Hale	Whig	1846 (late)	Incumbent retired. Whig hold.	First ballot (November 13, 1848): ▌Orin Fowler (Whig) 46.6%; ▌Nathaniel Morton (Free Soil) 31.6%; ▌Foster Hooper (Democratic) 21.8%; Second ballot (January 1, 1849): ▌ ✓ Orin Fowler (Whig) 51.3%; ▌Nathaniel Morton (Free Soil) 29.3%; ▌Foster Hooper (Democratic) 19.4%
Massachusetts 10	Joseph Grinnell	Whig	1843 (special)	Incumbent re-elected.	▌ ✓ Joseph Grinnell (Whig) 56.2%; ▌Abraham H. Howland (Free Soil) 17.9%; ▌Charles B. Fessenden (Democratic) 14.3%; ▌Sampson Hart (Free Soil) 8.0%; ▌John A. Kasson (Free Soil) 3.6%

== Michigan ==
Elections were held November 7, 1848.

District	Incumbent			This race	
District	Member	Party	First elected	Results	Candidates
Michigan 1	Robert McClelland	Democratic	1843	Incumbent retired. Democratic hold.	▌ ✓ Alexander W. Buel (Democratic) 46.8%; ▌George C. Bates (Whig) 40.8%; ▌Caleb N. Ormsby (Free Soil) 12.4%
Michigan 2	Charles E. Stuart	Democratic	1847 (special)	Incumbent lost re-election. Whig gain.	▌ ✓ William Sprague (Whig) 53.3%; ▌Charles E. Stuart (Democratic) 46.7%
Michigan 3	Kinsley S. Bingham	Democratic	1846	Incumbent re-elected.	▌ ✓ Kinsley S. Bingham (Democratic) 51.0%; ▌George H. Hazelton (Whig) 38.7%; ▌John M. Lamb (Free Soil) 10.3%

== Minnesota Territory ==
See Non-voting delegates, below.

== Mississippi ==
Elections were held November 5–6, 1849, after the March 4, 1849 beginning of the term, but before the House first convened in December 1849.

District	Incumbent			This race	
District	Member	Party	First elected	Results	Candidates
Mississippi 1	Jacob Thompson	Democratic	1839	Incumbent re-elected.	▌ ✓ Jacob Thompson (Democratic) 57.3%; ▌Alexander B. Bradford (Whig) 42.7%
Mississippi 2	Winfield S. Featherston	Democratic	1847	Incumbent re-elected.	▌ ✓ Winfield S. Featherston (Democratic) 54.0%; ▌William L. Harris (Whig) 46.0%
Mississippi 3	Patrick W. Tompkins	Whig	1847	Incumbent retired. Democratic gain.	▌ ✓ William McWillie (Democratic) 52.0%; ▌Henry Gray (Whig) 48.0%
Mississippi 4	Albert G. Brown	Democratic	1847	Incumbent re-elected.	▌ ✓ Albert G. Brown (Democratic) 67.6%; ▌William Winans (Whig) 32.4%

== Missouri ==
Elections were held August 7, 1848.

District	Incumbent			This race	
District	Member	Party	First elected	Results	Candidates
Missouri 1	James B. Bowlin	Democratic	1842	Incumbent re-elected.	▌ ✓ James B. Bowlin (Democratic) 60.4%; ▌John D. Cook (Whig) 39.6%
Missouri 2	John Jameson	Democratic	1839 (special); 1840 (retired); 1842; 1844 (retired); 1846	Incumbent retired. Democratic hold.	▌ ✓ William Van Ness Bay (Democratic) 54.6%; ▌Gilchrist Porter (Whig) 45.4%
Missouri 3	James S. Green	Democratic	1846	Incumbent re-elected.	▌ ✓ James S. Green (Democratic) 56.8%; ▌Robert Wilson (Whig) 43.2%
Missouri 4	Willard P. Hall	Democratic	1846	Incumbent re-elected.	▌ ✓ Willard P. Hall (Democratic) 65.0%; ▌James Harvey Birch (Whig) 35.0%
Missouri 5	John S. Phelps	Democratic	1844	Incumbent re-elected.	▌ ✓ John S. Phelps (Democratic) 65.4%; ▌James Winston (Whig) 34.6%

== New Hampshire ==
Elections were held March 13, 1849, after the March 4, 1849 beginning of the term, but before the House first convened in December 1849.

District	Incumbent			This race	
District	Member	Party	First elected	Results	Candidates
New Hampshire 1	Amos Tuck	Independent	1847	Incumbent re-elected as a Free Soiler. Free Soil gain.	▌ ✓ Amos Tuck (Free Soil) 51.2%; ▌George W. Kittredge (Democratic) 48.8%
New Hampshire 2	Charles H. Peaslee	Democratic	1847	Incumbent re-elected.	▌ ✓ Charles H. Peaslee (Democratic) 60.9%; ▌Joel Eastman (Whig) 26.0%; ▌Isaac B. Stewart (Free Soil) 13.1%
New Hampshire 3	James Wilson II	Whig	1847	Incumbent re-elected.	▌ ✓ James Wilson II (Whig) 51.3%; ▌Frederick Vose (Democratic) 48.7%
New Hampshire 4	James Hutchins Johnson	Democratic	1845	Incumbent retired. Democratic hold.	▌ ✓ Harry Hibbard (Democratic) 57.9%; ▌Jonathan K. Kitteridge (Whig) 28.7%; ▌John H. White (Free Soil) 13.4%

== New Jersey ==
Elections were held November 7, 1848.

District	Incumbent			This race	
District	Member	Party	First elected	Results	Candidates
New Jersey 1	James G. Hampton	Whig	1844	Incumbent retired. Whig hold.	▌ ✓ Andrew K. Hay (Whig) 51.0%; ▌Jonathan Pitney (Democratic) 43.8%; ▌Charles J. Hollis (Know Nothing) 5.2%
New Jersey 2	William A. Newell	Whig	1846	Incumbent re-elected.	▌ ✓ William A. Newell (Whig) 54.1%; ▌Stacy G. Potts (Democratic) 45.9%
New Jersey 3	Joseph E. Edsall	Democratic	1844	Incumbent retired. Democratic hold.	▌ ✓ Isaac Wildrick (Democratic) 76.8%; ▌Archibald Robertson (Whig) 23.2%
New Jersey 4	John Van Dyke	Whig	1846	Incumbent re-elected.	▌ ✓ John Van Dyke (Whig) 54.5%; ▌Henry Holland (Democratic) 45.0%; ▌[FNU] Sewell (Free Soil) 0.5%
New Jersey 5	Dudley S. Gregory	Whig	1846	Incumbent retired. Whig hold.	▌ ✓ James G. King (Whig) 56.7%; ▌Joseph Hollingsworth (Democratic) 39.3%; ▌James Horn (Free Soil) 4.0%

== New York ==
Elections were held November 7, 1848.

District	Incumbent			This race	
District	Member	Party	First elected	Results	Candidates
New York 1	Frederick William Lord	Democratic	1846	Incumbent retired. Whig gain.	▌ ✓ John A. King (Whig) 47.8%; ▌Henry F. Jones (Free Soil) 26.7%; ▌William H. Brown (Democratic) 25.4%; ▌Joseph H. Goldsmith (Liberty) 0.1%
New York 2	Henry C. Murphy	Democratic	1842; 1844 (lost); 1846	Incumbent retired. Whig gain.	▌ ✓ David A. Bokee (Whig) 53.9%; ▌Paul Mersereau (Democratic) 38.3%; ▌Philip S. Crooke (Free Soil) 7.2%; ▌Kerrigan Murphy (Liberty) 0.6%
New York 3	Henry Nicoll	Democratic	1846	Incumbent retired. Whig gain.	▌ ✓ Jonas P. Phoenix (Whig) 55.0%; ▌Emanuel B. Hart (Democratic) 37.2%; ▌Reuel Smith (Free Soil) 7.8%
New York 4	William B. Maclay	Democratic	1842	Incumbent lost re-election. Whig gain.	▌ ✓ Walter Underhill (Whig) 49.0%; ▌William B. Maclay (Democratic) 33.8%; ▌John Hecker (Free Soil) 9.0%; ▌John Foote (Ind. Democrat) 0.6%
New York 5	Frederick A. Tallmadge	Whig	1846	Incumbent retired. Whig hold.	▌ ✓ George Briggs (Whig) 49.1%; ▌Michael Walsh (Democratic) 24.1%; ▌Stephen Hasbrouck (Ind. Democrat) 13.9%; ▌Mark Spencer (Free Soil) 12.9%
New York 6	Vacant			Rep. David S. Jackson (D) was vacated from his seat on April 19, 1848, after an election contest. Whig gain. Winner was not elected the same day to finish the current term; see above.	▌ ✓ James Brooks (Whig) 51.7%; ▌George Law (Democratic) 37.2%; ▌David Dudley Field II (Free Soil) 10.9%; ▌James Monroe (Ind. Whig) 0.2%
New York 7	William Nelson	Whig	1846	Incumbent re-elected.	▌ ✓ William Nelson (Whig) 50.3%; ▌Nicholas C. Blauvelt (Democratic) 31.9%; ▌John C. Blauvelt (Free Soil) 17.8%
New York 8	Cornelius Warren	Whig	1846	Incumbent retired. Whig hold.	▌ ✓ Ransom Halloway (Whig) 51.2%; ▌Charles Ga Nun (Democratic) 35.2%; ▌Benjamin V. Bailey (Free Soil) 13.6%
New York 9	Daniel B. St. John	Whig	1846	Incumbent retired. Whig hold.	▌ ✓ Thomas McKissock (Whig) 47.3%; ▌Charles S. Woodward (Democratic) 37.6%; ▌James C. Curtis (Free Soil) 15.1%
New York 10	Eliakim Sherrill	Whig	1846	Incumbent retired. Whig hold.	▌ ✓ Herman D. Gould (Whig) 40.0%; ▌John Edgerton (Free Soil) 28.3%; ▌Almiron Fitch (Anti-Rent) 19.2%; ▌Truman H. Wheeler (Democratic) 12.5%
New York 11	Peter H. Silvester	Whig	1846	Incumbent re-elected.	▌ ✓ Peter H. Silvester (Whig) 47.4%; ▌Danforth K. Olney (Anti-Rent Whig) 27.9%; ▌John P. Beekman (Free Soil) 24.7%
New York 12	Gideon Reynolds	Whig	1846	Incumbent re-elected as an Anti-Rent Whig.	▌ ✓ Gideon Reynolds (Anti-Rent Whig) 52.9%; ▌George B. Warren (Whig) 46.8%; ▌John L. Dunlap (Liberty) 0.3%
New York 13	John I. Slingerland	Whig	1846	Incumbent retired. Whig hold.	▌ ✓ John L. Schoolcraft (Whig) 53.9%; ▌Charles F. Bouton (Democratic) 28.9%; ▌Bradford R. Wood (Free Soil) 17.2%
New York 14	Orlando Kellogg	Whig	1846	Incumbent retired. Whig hold.	▌ ✓ George Rex Andrews (Whig) 57.0%; ▌Erastus D. Culver (Free Soil) 25.4%; ▌Francis B. Cutting (Democratic) 17.6%
New York 15	Sidney Lawrence	Democratic	1846	Incumbent lost re-election as Free Soil candidate. Whig gain.	▌ ✓ John R. Thurman (Whig) 42.7%; ▌William Hedding (Democratic) 31.5%; ▌Sidney Lawrence (Free Soil) 25.8%
New York 16	Hugh White	Whig	1844	Incumbent re-elected.	▌ ✓ Hugh White (Whig) 52.2%; ▌Daniel D. Campbell (Democratic) 26.0%; ▌Patrick H. Cowen (Free Soil) 21.8%
New York 17	George Petrie	Independent; Democratic	1846	Incumbent retired. Whig gain.	▌ ✓ Henry P. Alexander (Whig) 47.2%; ▌John Nellis (Free Soil) 43.0%; ▌Simeon Sammons (Democratic) 9.7%; ▌Jesse Campbell (Liberty) 0.1%
New York 18	William Collins	Democratic	1846	Incumbent retired. Free Soil gain.	▌ ✓ Preston King (Free Soil) 53.1%; ▌Benjamin Squire (Whig) 37.3%; ▌Edwin Dodge (Democratic) 9.6%
New York 19	Joseph Mullin	Whig	1846	Incumbent retired. Whig hold.	▌ ✓ Charles E. Clarke (Whig) 39.7%; ▌Willard Ives (Free Soil) 37.9%; ▌Jesse C. Dunn (Democratic) 22.4%
New York 20	Timothy Jenkins	Democratic	1844	Incumbent retired. Whig gain.	▌ ✓ Orsamus B. Matteson (Whig) 42.2%; ▌Charles A. Mann (Free Soil) 35.1%; ▌James W. Williams (Democratic) 22.2%; ▌Beriah Green (Liberty) 0.5%
New York 21	George Anson Starkweather	Democratic	1846	Incumbent retired. Democratic hold.	▌ ✓ Hiram Walden (Democratic) 42.1%; ▌Thomas Smith (Whig) 40.2%; ▌Jabez Delano Hammond (Free Soil) 17.7%
New York 22	Ausburn Birdsall	Democratic	1846	Incumbent retired. Whig gain.	▌ ✓ Henry Bennett (Whig) 46.4%; ▌William Mason (Democratic) 37.0%; ▌Samuel A. Smith (Free Soil) 16.5%; ▌Hammond D. Pomeroy (Liberty) 0.1%
New York 23	William Duer	Whig	1846	Incumbent re-elected.	▌ ✓ William Duer (Whig) 48.7%; ▌James W. Nye (Free Soil) 41.4%; ▌Daniel Crouse (Democratic) 9.9%
New York 24	Daniel Gott	Whig	1846	Incumbent re-elected.	▌ ✓ Daniel Gott (Whig) 42.1%; ▌Charles B. Sedgwick (Free Soil) 38.3%; ▌Harvey Baldwin (Democratic) 19.5%; ▌Thomas G. White (Liberty) 0.1%
New York 25	Harmon S. Conger	Whig	1846	Incumbent re-elected.	▌ ✓ Harmon S. Conger (Whig) 46.9%; ▌Horatio Ballard (Free Soil) 40.0%; ▌Frederick Hyde (Democratic) 13.0%; ▌Samuel Ringgold Ward (Liberty) 0.1%
New York 26	William T. Lawrence	Whig	1846	Incumbent retired. Whig hold.	▌ ✓ William Terry Jackson (Whig) 40.4%; ▌John W. Wisner (Free Soil) 40.1%; ▌Samuel G. Hathaway (Democratic) 19.5%
New York 27	Vacant			Rep. John M. Holley (W) died March 8, 1848. Whig hold. Winner was not elected the same day to finish the current term; see above.	▌ ✓ William A. Sackett (Whig) 45.2%; ▌Ansel Bascom (Free Soil) 40.7%; ▌John Bigelow (Democratic) 14.0%; ▌Jonathan Metcalf (Liberty) 0.1%
New York 28	Elias B. Holmes	Whig	1844	Incumbent retired. Whig hold.	▌ ✓ Abraham M. Schermerhorn (Whig) 52.0%; ▌Henry R. Selden (Free Soil) 37.3%; ▌E. Darwin Smith (Democratic) 10.7%
New York 29	Robert L. Rose	Whig	1846	Incumbent re-elected.	▌ ✓ Robert L. Rose (Whig) 53.0%; ▌Joseph Garlinghouse (Free Soil) 31.6%; ▌George R. Parburt (Democratic) 14.7%; ▌Abraham Pennel (Liberty) 0.7%
New York 30	David Rumsey	Whig	1846	Incumbent re-elected.	▌ ✓ David Rumsey (Whig) 44.9%; ▌Martin Grover (Free Soil) 36.6%; ▌George R. Parburt (Democratic) 18.4%; ▌Alanson Richmond (Liberty) 0.1%
New York 31	Dudley Marvin	Whig	1822; 1828 (lost); 1846	Incumbent retired. Whig hold.	▌ ✓ Elijah Risley (Whig) 51.7%; ▌Amasa L. Chaffee (Democratic) 27.2%; ▌Truman R. Colman (Free Soil) 21.1%
New York 32	Nathan K. Hall	Whig	1846	Incumbent retired. Whig hold.	▌ ✓ Elbridge G. Spaulding (Whig) 56.9%; ▌George W. Clinton (Democratic) 25.4%; ▌James S. Wadsworth (Free Soil) 17.7%
New York 33	Harvey Putnam	Whig	1838 (special); 1838 (retired); 1846	Incumbent re-elected.	▌ ✓ Harvey Putnam (Whig) 50.5%; ▌W. Riley Smith (Free Soil) 25.6%; ▌Samuel W. Willett (Democratic) 23.7%; ▌Hugh T. Brooks (Liberty) 0.2%
New York 34	Washington Hunt	Whig	1842	Incumbent retired. Whig hold.	▌ ✓ Lorenzo Burrows (Whig) 46.9%; ▌Noah Davis (Free Soil) 33.5%; ▌Silas M. Burroughs (Democratic) 19.3%; ▌Samuel Salisbury (Liberty) 0.3%

== North Carolina ==
Elections were held August 7, 1849, after the March 4, 1849 beginning of the term, but before the House first convened in December 1849.

District	Incumbent			This race	
District	Member	Party	First elected	Results	Candidates
North Carolina 1	Thomas L. Clingman	Whig	1843; 1845 (lost); 1847	Incumbent re-elected.	▌ ✓ Thomas L. Clingman (Whig) 86.3%; Scattering 13.7%
North Carolina 2	Nathaniel Boyden	Whig	1847	Incumbent retired. Whig hold.	▌ ✓ Joseph Pearson Caldwell (Whig) 76.9%; ▌Montford S. Stokes (Democratic) 21.7%; Scattering 1.4%
North Carolina 3	Daniel Moreau Barringer	Whig	1843	Incumbent retired. Whig hold.	▌ ✓ Edmund Deberry (Whig) 53.3%; ▌Greene Washington Caldwell (Democratic) 46.7%
North Carolina 4	Augustine Henry Shepperd	Whig	1827; 1839 (lost); 1841; 1843 (retired); 1847	Incumbent re-elected.	▌ ✓ Augustine Henry Shepperd (Whig) 58.4%; ▌Thomas W. Keene (Democratic) 41.6%
North Carolina 5	Abraham Watkins Venable	Democratic	1847	Incumbent re-elected.	▌ ✓ Abraham Watkins Venable (Democratic) 53.8%; ▌Henry K. Nash (Whig) 46.2%
North Carolina 6	John R. J. Daniel	Democratic	1841	Incumbent re-elected.	▌ ✓ John R. J. Daniel (Democratic) 64.4%; ▌William J. Clarke (Ind. Democratic) 35.6%
North Carolina 7	James Iver McKay	Democratic	1831	Incumbent retired. Democratic hold.	▌ ✓ William S. Ashe (Democratic) 64.6%; ▌David S. Reid (Democratic) 35.4%
North Carolina 8	Richard Spaight Donnell	Whig	1847	Incumbent retired. Whig hold.	▌ ✓ Edward Stanly (Whig) 50.2%; ▌William K. Lane (Democratic) 49.8%
North Carolina 9	David Outlaw	Whig	1847	Incumbent re-elected.	▌ ✓ David Outlaw (Whig) 53.8%; ▌Thomas Person (Democratic) 46.2%

== Ohio ==
Elections were held October 10, 1848.

District	Incumbent			This race	
District	Member	Party	First elected	Results	Candidates
Ohio 1	James J. Faran	Democratic	1844	Incumbent retired. Democratic hold.	▌ ✓ David T. Disney (Democratic) 50.9%; ▌Thomas J. Strait (Whig) 34.5%; ▌Samuel Lewis (Free Soil) 11.8%; ▌M. S. Wade (Unknown) 2.8%
Ohio 2	David Fisher	Whig	1846	Incumbent retired. Whig hold.	▌ ✓ Lewis D. Campbell (Whig) 51.6%; ▌William H. Baldwin (Democratic) 48.4%
Ohio 3	Robert C. Schenck	Whig	1843	Incumbent re-elected.	▌ ✓ Robert C. Schenck (Whig) 53.5%; ▌Joseph W. McCorkle (Democratic) 46.5%
Ohio 4	Richard S. Canby	Whig	1846	Incumbent retired. Whig hold.	▌ ✓ Moses Bledso Corwin (Whig) 54.7%; ▌John A. Corwin (Democratic) 38.8%; ▌William A. Rogers (Free Soil) 6.5%
Ohio 5	William Sawyer	Democratic	1844	Incumbent retired. Democratic hold.	▌ ✓ Emery D. Potter (Democratic) 62.4%; ▌John Fitch (Whig) 37.6%
Ohio 6	Rodolphus Dickinson	Democratic	1846	Incumbent re-elected. Incumbent then died March 20, 1849, leading to a special election; see above.	▌ ✓ Rodolphus Dickinson (Democratic) 58.8%; ▌Cooper K. Watson (Whig) 41.2%
Ohio 7	Jonathan D. Morris	Democratic	1847 (special)	Incumbent re-elected.	▌ ✓ Jonathan D. Morris (Democratic) 59.5%; ▌John Joliffe (Free Soil) 29.9%; ▌Thomas Gatch (Whig) 10.6%
Ohio 8	John L. Taylor	Whig	1846	Incumbent re-elected.	▌ ✓ John L. Taylor (Whig) 52.9%; ▌Francis Cleveland (Democratic) 47.1%
Ohio 9	Thomas O. Edwards	Whig	1846	Incumbent lost re-election. Democratic gain.	▌ ✓ Edson B. Olds (Democratic) 50.3%; ▌Thomas O. Edwards (Whig) 49.7%
Ohio 10	Daniel Duncan	Whig	1846	Incumbent lost re-election. Democratic gain.	▌ ✓ Charles Sweetser (Democratic) 49.5%; ▌Daniel Duncan (Whig) 49.4%; ▌Edwin C. Wright (Unknown) 1.1%
Ohio 11	John K. Miller	Democratic	1846	Incumbent re-elected.	▌ ✓ John K. Miller (Democratic) 62.7%; ▌Jacob Brinkerhoff (Whig) 37.3%
Ohio 12	Samuel F. Vinton	Whig	1822; 1836 (retired); 1843	Incumbent re-elected.	▌ ✓ Samuel F. Vinton (Whig) 53.3%; ▌Simeon W. Tucker (Democratic) 40.6%; ▌David Richmond (Ind. Democratic) 6.1%
Ohio 13	Thomas Ritchey	Democratic	1846	Incumbent retired. Democratic hold.	▌ ✓ William A. Whittlesey (Democratic) 51.4%; ▌William P. Cutler (Whig) 48.6%
Ohio 14	Nathan Evans	Whig	1846	Incumbent re-elected.	▌ ✓ Nathan Evans (Whig) 53.1%; ▌Matthew Gaston (Democratic) 46.9%
Ohio 15	William Kennon Jr.	Democratic	1846	Incumbent lost re-election. Whig gain.	▌ ✓ William F. Hunter (Whig) 51.4%; ▌William Kennon Jr. (Democratic) 48.6%
Ohio 16	John D. Cummins	Democratic	1844	Incumbent retired. Democratic hold.	▌ ✓ Moses Hoagland (Democratic) 54.0%; ▌Martin Welker (Whig) 45.5%; ▌Joseph Ankeny (Unknown) 0.5%
Ohio 17	George Fries	Democratic	1844	Incumbent retired. Democratic hold.	▌ ✓ Joseph Cable (Democratic) 50.2%; ▌Joseph Mason (Whig) 45.5%; ▌Wiliam Farmer (Free Soil) 4.3%
Ohio 18	Samuel Lahm	Democratic	1846	Incumbent retired. Democratic hold.	▌ ✓ David Kellogg Cartter (Democratic) 60.0%; ▌Samuel Hemphill (Whig) 40.0%
Ohio 19	John Crowell	Whig	1846	Incumbent re-elected.	▌ ✓ John Crowell (Whig) 56.0%; ▌Rufus P. Ranney (Democratic) 44.0%
Ohio 20	Joshua Reed Giddings	Whig	1838 (special); 1842 (resigned); 1842 (special)	Incumbent re-elected as a Free Soiler. Free Soil gain.	▌ ✓ Joshua Reed Giddings (Free Soil) 62.9%; ▌Bushnell White (Democratic) 33.7%; ▌J. Hayward (Ind. Whig) 3.4%
Ohio 21	Joseph M. Root	Whig	1844	Incumbent re-elected as a Free Soiler. Free Soil gain.	▌ ✓ Joseph M. Root (Free Soil) 57.8%; ▌Ezra M. Stone (Democratic) 41.6%%; Scattering 3.4%

== Oregon Territory ==
See Non-voting delegates, below.

== Pennsylvania ==
Elections were held October 10, 1848.

District	Incumbent			This race	
District	Member	Party	First elected	Results	Candidates
Pennsylvania 1	Lewis Charles Levin	Know Nothing	1844	Incumbent re-elected.	▌ ✓ Lewis Charles Levin (Know Nothing) 51.9%; ▌Thomas B. Florence (Democratic) 44.8%; ▌David P. Brown (Independent) 1.7%; ▌Morton A. Stule (Whig) 0.8%; ▌Joseph R. Chandler (Whig) 0.5%; ▌James C. Van Dyke (Democratic) 0.3%
Pennsylvania 2	Joseph Reed Ingersoll	Whig	1834; 1836 (retired); 1841 (special)	Incumbent declined to accept renomination. Whig hold.	▌ ✓ Joseph R. Chandler (Whig) 63.2%; ▌James C. Van Dyke (Democratic) 36.8%
Pennsylvania 3	Charles Brown	Democratic	1840; 1842 (retired); 1846	Incumbent retired. Whig gain.	▌ ✓ Henry D. Moore (Whig) 53.0%; ▌William S. Hallowell (Democratic) 47.0%
Pennsylvania 4	Charles Jared Ingersoll	Democratic	1812; 1814 (lost); 1840	Incumbent retired. Democratic hold.	▌ ✓ John Robbins (Democratic) 51.6%; ▌John S. Little (Whig) 48.4%
Pennsylvania 5	John Freedley	Whig	1846	Incumbent re-elected.	▌ ✓ John Freedley (Whig) 50.7%; ▌Alexander McKeever (Democratic) 49.3%
Pennsylvania 6	Samuel A. Bridges	Democratic	1848 (special)	Incumbent retired. Democratic hold.	▌ ✓ Thomas Ross (Democratic) 51.0%; ▌Caleb N. Taylor (Whig) 49.0%
Pennsylvania 7	Abraham Robinson McIlvaine	Whig	1843	Incumbent lost renomination. Whig hold.	▌ ✓ Jesse C. Dickey (Whig) 52.9%; ▌Joseph Hemphill (Democratic) 47.1%
Pennsylvania 8	John Strohm	Whig	1844	Incumbent retired. Whig hold.	▌ ✓ Thaddeus Stevens (Whig) 63.6%; ▌Emaunel Shaffer (Democratic) 36.4%
Pennsylvania 9	William Strong	Democratic	1846	Incumbent re-elected.	▌ ✓ William Strong (Democratic) 67.8%; ▌Peter Addams (Whig) 32.2%
Pennsylvania 10	Richard Brodhead	Democratic	1843	Incumbent retired. Democratic hold.	▌ ✓ Milo Melankthon Dimmick (Democratic) 62.8%; ▌Earl Wheeler (Whig) 35.9%; ▌Charles Wheeler (Independent) 1.3%
Pennsylvania 11	Chester P. Butler	Whig	1846	Incumbent re-elected.	▌ ✓ Chester P. Butler (Whig) 42.3%; ▌Hendrick B. Wright (Democratic) 41.6%; ▌Samuel P. Collins (Ind. Democratic) 16.1%
Pennsylvania 12	David Wilmot	Democratic	1844	Incumbent re-elected.	▌ ✓ David Wilmot (Democratic) 60.1%; ▌Henry Wells Tracy (Whig) 33.5%; ▌Jonah Brewster (Cass Democratic) 6.4%
Pennsylvania 13	James Pollock	Whig	1844 (special)	Incumbent retired. Whig hold.	▌ ✓ Joseph Casey (Whig) 50.8%; ▌William A. Petrikin (Democratic) 49.2%
Pennsylvania 14	George Nicholas Eckert	Whig	1846	Incumbent retired. Whig hold.	▌ ✓ Charles W. Pitman (Whig) 58.1%; ▌William M. Dock (Democratic) 41.9%
Pennsylvania 15	Henry Nes	Whig	1843; 1844 (retired); 1846	Incumbent re-elected.	▌ ✓ Henry Nes (Whig) 52.4%; ▌Joel Buchanan Danner (Democratic) 47.6%
Pennsylvania 16	Jasper Ewing Brady	Whig	1846	Incumbent lost re-election. Democratic gain.	▌ ✓ James X. McLanahan (Democratic) 50.5%; ▌Jasper Ewing Brady (Whig) 49.5%
Pennsylvania 17	John Blanchard	Whig	1844	Incumbent retired. Whig hold.	▌ ✓ Samuel Calvin (Whig) 50.2%; ▌Andrew Parker (Democratic) 49.8%
Pennsylvania 18	Andrew Stewart	Whig	1820; 1828 (lost); 1830; 1834 (lost); 1843	Incumbent retired. Whig hold.	▌ ✓ Andrew J. Ogle (Whig) 50.9%; ▌John L. Dawson (Democratic) 49.1%
Pennsylvania 19	Job Mann	Democratic	1834; 1836 (lost); 1846	Incumbent re-elected.	▌ ✓ Job Mann (Democratic) 59.1%; ▌Peter Livergood (Whig) 40.9%
Pennsylvania 20	John Dickey	Whig	1843; 1844 (retired); 1846	Incumbent retired. Whig hold.	▌ ✓ Robert R. Reed (Whig) 48.4%; ▌William Hopkins (Democratic) 47.9%; ▌John Clark (Free Soil) 3.7%
Pennsylvania 21	Moses Hampton	Whig	1846	Incumbent re-elected.	▌ ✓ Moses Hampton (Whig) 50.8%; ▌Samuel W. Black (Democratic) 43.9%; ▌George W. Jackson (Free Soil) 3.6%; ▌Israel Cullen (Know Nothing) 1.7%
Pennsylvania 22	John W. Farrelly	Whig	1846	Incumbent retired. Free Soil gain.	▌ ✓ John W. Howe (Free Soil) 51.2%; ▌James E. McFarland (Democratic) 48.8%
Pennsylvania 23	James Thompson	Democratic	1844	Incumbent re-elected.	▌ ✓ James Thompson (Democratic) 50.8%; ▌James Campbell (Whig) 47.5%; ▌John Mann (Free Soil) 1.7%
Pennsylvania 24	Alexander Irvin	Whig	1846	Incumbent retired. Democratic gain.	▌ ✓ Alfred Gilmore (Democratic) 50.5%; ▌George W. Smith (Whig) 48.4%; ▌Daniel McGlaughlin (Free Soil) 1.1%

== Rhode Island ==
Elections were held April 4, 1849, after the March 4, 1849 beginning of the term, but before the House first convened in December 1849.

District	Incumbent			This race	
District	Member	Party	First elected	Results	Candidates
Rhode Island 1	Robert B. Cranston	Whig	1837; 1843 (retired); 1847	Incumbent retired. Whig hold.	▌ ✓ George Gordon King (Whig) 67.5%; ▌Fenner Brown (Democratic) 27.8%; ▌John Boyden (Free Soil) 4.7%
Rhode Island 2	Benjamin B. Thurston	Democratic	1847	Incumbent lost re-election. Whig gain.	First ballot (April 4, 1849): ▌Benjamin B. Thurston (Democratic) 48.3%; ▌Sylvester G. Sherman (Whig) 47.8%; ▌Lauriston Hall (Free Soil) 3.9%; Second ballot (August 28, 1849): ▌ ✓ Nathan F. Dixon II (Whig) 56.1%; ▌Benjamin B. Thurston (Democratic) 45.9%

== South Carolina ==
Elections were held October 9–10, 1848.

District	Incumbent			This race	
District	Member	Party	First elected	Results	Candidates
South Carolina 1	Daniel Wallace	Democratic	1848 (special)	Incumbent re-elected.	▌ ✓ Daniel Wallace (Democratic) 39.6%; ▌H. F. Thompson (Unknown) 35.8%; ▌W. F. Davie (Unknown) 24.6%
South Carolina 2	Richard F. Simpson	Democratic	1843	Incumbent retired. Democratic hold.	▌ ✓ James Lawrence Orr (Democratic) 54.0%; ▌Benjamin Franklin Perry (Democratic) 46.0%
South Carolina 3	Joseph A. Woodward	Democratic	1843	Incumbent re-elected.	▌ ✓ Joseph A. Woodward (Democratic) 68.7%; ▌J. O'Hanlon (Unknown) 31.3%
South Carolina 4	Alexander D. Sims	Democratic	1844	Incumbent re-elected. Incumbent then died November 22, 1848, leading to two special elections; see above.	▌ ✓ Alexander D. Sims (Conservative Democratic) 50.5%; ▌John McQueen (Cass Democratic) 49.5%
South Carolina 5	Armistead Burt	Democratic	1843	Incumbent re-elected.	▌ ✓ Armistead Burt (Democratic) 84.2%; ▌S. L. Heller (Unknown) 15.8%
South Carolina 6	Isaac E. Holmes	Democratic	1838	Incumbent re-elected.	▌ ✓ Isaac E. Holmes (Taylor Democratic) 53.0%; ▌Samuel G. Barker (Cass Democratic) 44.6%; ▌William M. Clayton (Unknown) 2.4%
South Carolina 7	Robert Barnwell Rhett	Democratic	1836	Incumbent retired. Democratic hold.	▌ ✓ William F. Colcock (Democratic); Unopposed

== Tennessee ==
Tennessee Results, shaded according to winning candidates share of vote

Elections were held August 2, 1849.

District	Incumbent			This race	
District	Member	Party	First elected	Results	Candidates
Tennessee 1	Andrew Johnson	Democratic	1842	Incumbent re-elected.	▌ ✓ Andrew Johnson (Democratic) 52.4%; ▌Nathaniel G. Taylor (Whig) 43.7%; ▌Brookins Campbell (Democratic) 3.9%
Tennessee 2	William M. Cocke	Whig	1845	Incumbent lost re-election as a Democrat. Whig hold.	▌ ✓ Albert G. Watkins (Whig) 58.9%; ▌William M. Cocke (Democratic) 41.1%
Tennessee 3	John H. Crozier	Whig	1845	Incumbent retired. Whig hold.	▌ ✓ Josiah M. Anderson (Whig) 54.7%; ▌Thomas C. Lyon (Democratic) 45.3%
Tennessee 4	Hugh L.W. Hill	Democratic	1847	Incumbent retired. Democratic hold.	▌ ✓ John H. Savage (Democratic) 48.4%; ▌Samuel Turney (Unknown) 38.8%; ▌John B. Rogers (Whig) 12.78%
Tennessee 5	George W. Jones	Democratic	1842	Incumbent re-elected.	▌ ✓ George W. Jones (Democratic); Unopposed
Tennessee 6	James H. Thomas	Democratic	1847	Incumbent re-elected.	▌ ✓ James H. Thomas (Democratic) 56.1%; ▌Franklin Buchanan (Whig) 43.9%
Tennessee 7	Meredith P. Gentry	Whig	1839; 1842 (retired); 1845	Incumbent re-elected.	▌ ✓ Meredith P. Gentry (Whig) 95.3%; ▌[FNU] Bailey (Unknown) 4.7%
Tennessee 8	Washington Barrow	Whig	1847	Incumbent retired. Democratic gain.	▌ ✓ Andrew Ewing (Democratic) 50.4%; ▌William Calhoun (Whig) 49.6%
Tennessee 9	Lucien B. Chase	Democratic	1845	Incumbent retired. Democratic hold.	▌ ✓ Isham G. Harris (Democratic) 55.8%; ▌James T. Morris (Whig) 44.2%
Tennessee 10	Frederick P. Stanton	Democratic	1845	Incumbent re-elected.	▌ ✓ Frederick P. Stanton (Democratic) 51.9%; ▌John W. Harris (Whig) 48.1%
Tennessee 11	William T. Haskell	Whig	1847	Incumbent retired. Whig hold.	▌ ✓ Christopher H. Williams (Whig); Unopposed

== Texas ==
Elections were held August 6, 1849.

District	Incumbent			This race	
District	Member	Party	First elected	Results	Candidates
Texas 1	David S. Kaufman	Democratic	1846	Incumbent re-elected.	▌ ✓ David S. Kaufman (Democratic) 96.7%; ▌[FNU] Fitzpatrick (Unknown) 3.3%
Texas 2	Timothy Pilsbury	Democratic	1846	Incumbent lost re-election. Democratic hold.	▌ ✓ Volney Howard (Democratic) 41.9%; ▌Robert McAlpin Williamson (Unknown) 28.9%; ▌Timothy Pilsbury (Democratic) 20.6%; ▌Hugh McLeod (Unknown) 8.6%

== Vermont ==
Elections were held September 5, 1848.

District	Incumbent			This race	
District	Member	Party	First elected	Results	Candidates
Vermont 1	William Henry	Whig	1846	Incumbent re-elected.	▌ ✓ William Henry (Whig) 53.9%; ▌Daniel Roberts, Jr. (Democratic) 32.6%; ▌Jonathan D. Bradley (Free Soil Democratic) 9.9%; ▌John Roberts (Democratic) 3.6%
Vermont 2	Jacob Collamer	Whig	1843	Incumbent retired. Whig hold.	First ballot (September 5, 1848): ▌William Hebard (Whig) 44.0%; ▌Sumner A. Webber (Free Soil Democratic) 28.0%; ▌Edmund Weston (Democratic) 28.0%; Second ballot (November 7, 1848): ▌ ✓ William Hebard (Whig) 50.4%; ▌Sumner A. Webber (Free Soil Democratic) 47.0%; ▌Edmund Weston (Democratic) 2.6%
Vermont 3	George P. Marsh	Whig	1843	Incumbent re-elected. Incumbent then resigned May 29, 1849, leading to a special election; see above.	First ballot (September 5, 1848): ▌George P. Marsh (Whig) 48.4%; ▌Asahel Peck (Free Soil Democratic) 35.4%; ▌Stephen S. Keyes (Democratic) 16.2%; Second ballot (November 7, 1848): ▌ ✓ George P. Marsh (Whig) 54.0%; ▌Asahel Peck (Free Soil Democratic) 36.0%; ▌Stephen S. Keyes (Democratic) 10.0%
Vermont 4	Lucius B. Peck	Democratic	1846	Incumbent re-elected.	First ballot (September 5, 1848): ▌Lucius B. Peck (Democratic) 42.6%; ▌John L. Buck (Whig) 33.3%; ▌A. Judson Rowell (Free Soil Democratic) 24.1%; Second ballot (November 7, 1848): ▌ ✓ Lucius B. Peck (Democratic) 43.2%; ▌John L. Buck (Whig) 35.9%; ▌A. Judson Rowell (Free Soil Democratic) 20.9%

== Virginia ==
Elections were held April 26, 1849, after the March 4, 1849 beginning of the term, but before the House first convened in December 1849.

District	Incumbent			This race	
District	Member	Party	First elected	Results	Candidates
Virginia 1	Archibald Atkinson	Democratic	1843	Incumbent retired. Democratic hold.	▌ ✓ John Millson (Democratic) 51.7%; ▌Samuel Watts (Whig) 48.3%
Virginia 2	Richard Kidder Meade	Democratic	1847 (special)	Incumbent re-elected.	▌ ✓ Richard Kidder Meade (Democratic) 88.6%; ▌[FNU] Shell (Unknown) 5.7%; ▌S. J. Weisigner (Whig) 5.7%
Virginia 3	Thomas Flournoy	Whig	1847	Incumbent lost re-election. Democratic gain.	▌ ✓ Thomas H. Averett (Democratic) 50.7%; ▌Thomas Flournoy (Whig) 49.3%
Virginia 4	Thomas S. Bocock	Democratic	1847	Incumbent re-elected.	▌ ✓ Thomas S. Bocock (Democratic) 53.0%; ▌Henry P. Irving (Whig) 47.0%
Virginia 5	William L. Goggin	Whig	1839; 1843 (lost); 1844 (special); 1845 (retired); 1847	Incumbent lost re-election. Democratic gain.	▌ ✓ Paulus Powell (Democratic) 50.9%; ▌William L. Goggin (Whig) 49.1%
Virginia 6	John Botts	Whig	1839; 1843 (lost); 1847	Incumbent lost re-election. Democratic gain.	▌ ✓ James Seddon (Democratic) 50.6%; ▌John Botts (Whig) 43.7%; ▌C. C. Lee (Independent) 5.7%
Virginia 7	Thomas H. Bayly	Democratic	1844 (special)	Incumbent re-elected.	▌ ✓ Thomas H. Bayly (Democratic) 64.7%; ▌Francis Mallory (Whig) 35.3%
Virginia 8	Richard L. T. Beale	Democratic	1847	Incumbent retired. Democratic hold.	▌ ✓ Alexander Holladay (Democratic) 51.0%; ▌James M. Forbes (Whig) 49.0%
Virginia 9	John Pendleton	Whig	1845	Incumbent lost re-election. Independent Whig gain.	▌ ✓ Jeremiah Morton (Ind. Whig) 54.1%; ▌John Pendleton (Whig) 45.9%
Virginia 10	Henry Bedinger	Democratic	1845	Incumbent lost renomination. Democratic hold.	▌ ✓ Richard Parker (Democratic) 55.2%; ▌Charles J. Faulkner (Whig) 44.8%
Virginia 11	James McDowell	Democratic	1846 (special)	Incumbent re-elected.	▌ ✓ James McDowell (Democratic); Unopposed
Virginia 12	William B. Preston	Whig	1847	Incumbent retired. Democratic gain.	▌ ✓ Henry A. Edmundson (Democratic) 55.2%; ▌Francis T. Anderson (Whig) 44.8%
Virginia 13	Andrew S. Fulton	Whig	1847	Incumbent retired. Democratic gain.	▌ ✓ Fayette McMullen (Democratic) 67.2%; ▌John B. George (Whig) 32.8%
Virginia 14	Robert A. Thompson	Democratic	1847	Incumbent retired. Democratic hold.	▌ ✓ James M. H. Beale (Democratic) 51.3%; ▌William McComas (Whig) 48.7%
Virginia 15	William G. Brown Sr.	Democratic	1845	Incumbent lost renomination. Democratic hold. Winner then died September 8, 1849, leading to a special election; see above.	▌ ✓ Alexander Newman (Democratic); ▌Charles Wells Russell (Whig)

== Wisconsin ==
Wisconsin members were first elected in advance of its June 1848 statehood. It elected two members to finish the current term in the 30th Congress, and then it gained an elected an additional member for elections to the 31st Congress.

=== 30th Congress ===
Wisconsin's two members were elected May 8, 1848.

District	Incumbent			This race	
District	Member	Party	First elected	Results	Candidates
Wisconsin 1	None (new state)			New seat. Democratic gain.	▌ ✓ William Pitt Lynde (Democratic) 54.9%; ▌Edward V. Whiton (Whig) 41.2%; ▌Ichabod Codding (Liberty) 3.9%
Wisconsin 2	None (new state)			New seat. Democratic gain.	▌ ✓ Mason C. Darling (Democratic) 58.4%; ▌Alexander L. Collins (Whig) 41.2%; Scattering 0.4%

=== 31st Congress ===
Wisconsin's three members were elected November 7, 1848.

District	Incumbent			This race	
District	Member	Party	First elected	Results	Candidates
Wisconsin 1	William Pitt Lynde	Democratic	1848	Incumbent lost re-election. Free Soil gain.	▌ ✓ Charles Durkee (Free Soil) 38.5%; ▌William Pitt Lynde (Democratic) 33.9%; ▌Asahel Finch Jr. (Whig) 27.6%
Wisconsin 2	Mason C. Darling	Democratic	1848	Incumbent retired. Whig gain.	▌ ✓ Orsamus Cole (Whig) 45.2%; ▌A. Hyatt Smith (Democratic) 41.0%; ▌George W. Crabb (Free Soil) 13.8%
Wisconsin 3	None (new district)			New seat. Democratic gain.	▌ ✓ James Duane Doty (Democratic) 50.3%; ▌Timothy O. Howe (Whig) 29.3%; ▌Stoddard Judd (Free Soil) 20.4%

== Non-voting delegates ==
Going into these elections, there were no incumbent delegates, because the only territory — Wisconsin Territory — became a state in 1848. Two new territories — Minnesota Territory and Oregon Territory — were granted delegates in 1849.

District	Incumbent			This race	
District	Delegate	Party	First elected	Results	Candidates
Minnesota Territory	None (new district)			New seat. New delegate elected August 1, 1849. Democratic gain.	▌ ✓ Henry Hastings Sibley (Democratic); [data missing]
Oregon Territory	None (new district)			New seat. New delegate elected in 1849. Democratic gain.	▌ ✓ Samuel Thurston (Democratic); [data missing]

== See also ==
- 1848 United States elections
  - List of United States House of Representatives elections (1824–1854)
  - 1848 United States presidential election
  - 1848–49 United States Senate elections
- 30th United States Congress
- 31st United States Congress

== Bibliography ==
- Dubin, Michael J. (March 1, 1998). United States Congressional Elections, 1788-1997: The Official Results of the Elections of the 1st Through 105th Congresses. McFarland and Company. ISBN 978-0786402830.
- Martis, Kenneth C. (January 1, 1989). The Historical Atlas of Political Parties in the United States Congress, 1789-1989. Macmillan Publishing Company. ISBN 978-0029201701.
- Moore, John L., ed. (1994). Congressional Quarterly's Guide to U.S. Elections (Third ed.). Congressional Quarterly Inc. ISBN 978-0871879967.
- "Party Divisions of the House of Representatives* 1789–Present". Office of the Historian, House of United States House of Representatives.
