= Senator Hoar (disambiguation) =

George Frisbie Hoar (1826–1904) was a U.S. Senator from Massachusetts from 1877 to 1904. Senator Hoar may also refer to:

- Ebenezer R. Hoar (1816–1895), Massachusetts State Senate
- Roger Sherman Hoar (1887–1963), Massachusetts State Senate
- Samuel Hoar (1778–1856), Massachusetts State Senate
