= John G. Palfrey =

American clergyman, historian and politician (1796–1881

John Gorham Palfrey
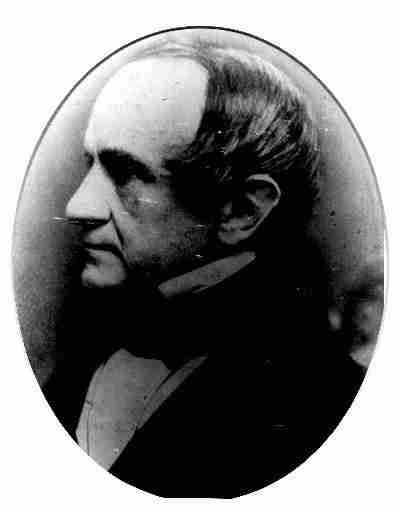

Member of the U.S. House of Representatives from Massachusetts's 4th district
- In office March 4, 1847 – March 3, 1849
- Preceded by: Benjamin Thompson
- Succeeded by: vacant; next occupied by Benjamin Thompson, from March 4, 1851.

10th Massachusetts Secretary of the Commonwealth
- In office 1844–1848
- Governor: George N. Briggs
- Preceded by: John A. Bolles
- Succeeded by: William B. Calhoun

Massachusetts House of Representatives
- In office 1842–1843

Personal details
- Born: May 2, 1796 Boston, Massachusetts
- Died: April 26, 1881 (aged 84) Cambridge, Massachusetts
- Resting place: Mount Auburn Cemetery
- Party: Whig, Free-Soil, Republican
- Spouse: Mary Ann Hammond
- Education: Phillips Exeter Academy, Harvard University, Harvard Divinity School.

John Gorham Palfrey (May 2, 1796 – April 26, 1881) was an American clergyman and historian who served as a U.S. representative from Massachusetts. A Unitarian minister, he played a leading role in the early history of Harvard Divinity School, and he later became involved in politics as a State Representative and U.S. Congressman.

== Early life and education ==
He was born in Boston, Massachusetts to Mary Sturgis Gorham and John Palfrey, a son of the merchant and Patriot William Palfrey. In 1803, his mother died soon after giving birth, and in 1804 his father moved to Baltimore. Palfrey began school at the Berry Street Academy in Boston and studied Greek and Latin with William Ellery Channing. He completed preparatory studies as a "charity student" at Phillips Exeter Academy, Exeter, New Hampshire, and graduated from Harvard University in 1815. He studied theology at Harvard Divinity School, graduating in its second class.

== Theologian ==
Palfrey was ordained minister of Boston's Brattle Square Unitarian Church on June 17, 1818. He held the usual duties of preaching two sermons every Sunday (with a substitute every fourth Sunday), calling on all his parishioners at least once a year, teaching Sunday school, and visiting the sick and poor. He was a member of the American Unitarian Association.

In 1827, Palfrey delivered three sermons on intemperance, which were published and widely circulated. In their first report, the American Society for the Promotion of Temperance gave special thanks to "the Rev. Dr. Beecher, and the Rev. Mr. Palfrey" for their "series of masterly discourses on the causes, extent, and remedies of intemperance."

A bas-relief by William Wetmore Story at Harvard

When the Society for the Promotion of Theological Education, which controlled Harvard Divinity School at the time, appealed to alumni for funds to build Divinity Hall, Palfrey preached two sermons to raise $2,000. He became the society's secretary in 1827 and a Harvard Overseer in 1828, when he also began teaching part-time. In 1831, after Andrews Norton retired in 1830, he became a Professor of Biblical Literature and Dean of Faculty at the Divinity School and removed to Cambridge. In this position, in addition to teaching the Bible, Hebrew, and other semitic languages, he was in charge of the building, organized faculty meetings, and was the chief disciplinarian. He made changes, including instituting a new set of rules for the school, reorganizing the curriculum, and dealing with complaints from faculty members about their salaries.

As a professor, he taught Unitarian ministers such as Andrew Peabody, William Henry Channing, James Freeman Clarke, Chandler Robbins, William Greenleaf Eliot, Cyrus A. Bartol, Charles Timothy Brooks, George Edward Ellis, Abiel Abbot Livermore, Theodore Parker, Henry Whitney Bellows, Edmund Hamilton Sears, Rufus Phineas Stebbins, the philosopher William Dexter Wilson, the artist Christopher Pearse Cranch, the music critic John Sullivan Dwight, and the Swedenborgian Benjamin Fiske Barrett.

After living in Divinity Hall with his students for several months, Palfrey built a house north of the college on 12 acres (49,000 m^{2}) he bought, which was the Palfrey home until 1916, when it was bought by Harvard. It still stands today as Palfrey House, part of the Department of Physics.

== Editor and author ==
To add to his income, Palfrey was at various times in his life editor of several publications. First, in 1824 and 1825 he was editor of the Christian Disciple, which he renamed the Christian Examiner. He was editor of the North American Review from 1835 to 1843, having become a financial partner in that publication in 1817 and having bought the Review in 1835. Difficulty managing both teaching and editing led him to resign from the Divinity School in 1839 when the Corporation would not allow him to teach part-time. He sold the Review in 1842 after it had become a financial liability, partly due to the Panic of 1837.

As a writer he is best known by his History of New England to the Revolutionary War, in five volumes, of which the first appeared in 1859 and the last posthumously in 1890. The writing of this consumed much of his later life, and he worked with early state sources and made a research trip to England in 1856. He also wrote various works on theology earlier in his career. He was elected a member of the American Antiquarian Society in 1856.

== Politician ==
Not having been politically involved or written in newspapers, he was nevertheless elected as a Whig to the Massachusetts House of Representatives in 1842 and 1843. He was chairman of the House Standing Committee on Education, working closely with Horace Mann. During his second term, however, the Whigs were in the minority, leading to several legislative disappointments, so he sought state office instead of re-election to the House. He became Massachusetts Secretary of the Commonwealth, a post he held from 1844 to 1848. As secretary, a largely ceremonial position, he introduced statistical tables which set a new standard for the state, organized the Revolutionary War records to better answer pension claims, and organized the state's 14,000 volumes and 40,000 pamphlets of written records.

Palfrey was elected as a Whig to the Thirtieth Congress (March 4, 1847 – March 3, 1849). He was a "Conscience Whig" who opposed slavery, having freed sixteen slaves inherited from his father, who, like his two brothers, was a successful Louisiana plantation owner. In Washington, he was a member of a small group of anti-slavery congressmen, including Joshua Giddings, who met regularly. His anti-slavery views alienated him from more conservative members of his district, such as the "Cotton Whigs," and in 1848 he was unsuccessful in his campaign for re-election on the Free-Soil ticket. (The seat remained vacant for the 31st Congress despite multiple elections, in which no candidate achieved the needed 51% majority.) He was also the Free-Soil candidate for Governor of Massachusetts in 1851.

In addition to opposing slavery, Congressman Palfrey advocated for the rights of free blacks traveling in the South and attempted unsuccessfully to remove provisions that limited suffrage to whites in Oregon's Territorial Constitution.

As the anti-slavery movement grew in Massachusetts and the Republican Party emerged, Palfrey's political fortunes improved again. After Abraham Lincoln's election in 1861, Senator Charles Sumner secured him appointment as Postmaster of Boston, a post he held from 1861 to 1867. He suffered a stroke in the mid-1870s and died in Cambridge, Massachusetts on April 26, 1881. He was interred in Mount Auburn Cemetery, Cambridge.

== Family ==
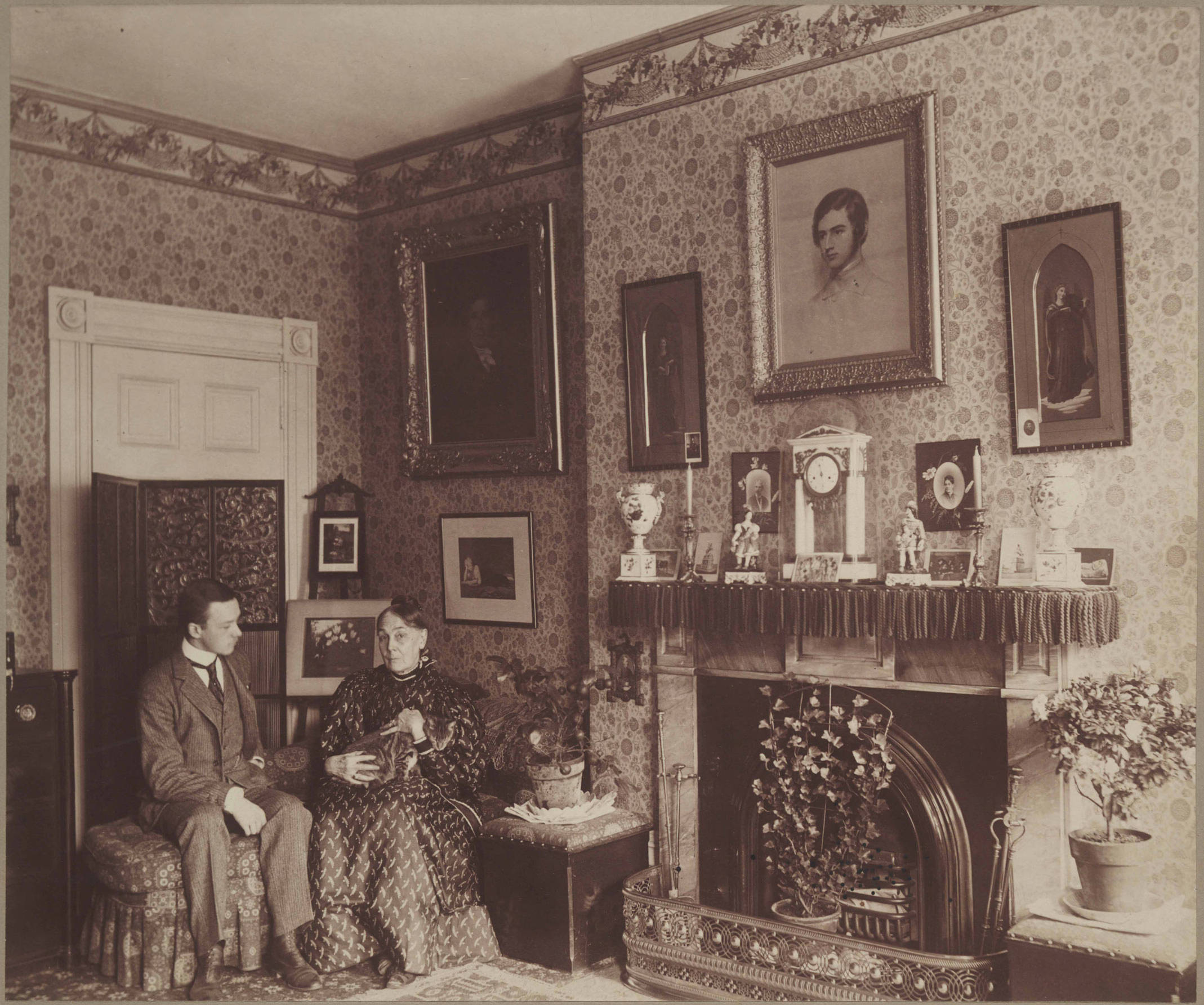
The interior of Mary Ann Hammond's residence at 72 Beacon Street shows her seated with Charles Hammond Gibso and her cat, Topsy, in a richly decorated room.

In March 1823, Palfrey married one of his parishioners, Mary Ann Hammond (1800–1897). Their children were Sarah Hammond (1823–1914), a novelist and poet; Hannah (1825); Francis Winthrop Palfrey (1831), historian of the Civil War; and John Carver Palfrey (1833–1906), a military engineer in the Civil War and a textile manufacturer. Mary Ann Hammond was the cousin of Charles Hammond Gibson Sr., whose son, Charles Hammond Gibson Jr., opened the Gibson House Museum. His 4th great grandson is Drew Palfrey.

== Sources ==
- John Gorham Palfrey – The First Dean of Harvard Divinity School – research guide from Harvard Divinity School Library, Harvard Divinity School
- United States Congress. "John G. Palfrey (id: P000033)". Biographical Directory of the United States Congress.

Party political offices
Preceded by Stephen C. Phillips	Free Soil nominee for Governor of Massachusetts; 1851	Succeeded by Horace Mann
U.S. House of Representatives
Preceded by Benjamin Thompson	Member of the U.S. House of Representatives from Massachusetts's 4th congressional district March 4, 1847 – March 3, 1849	Succeeded by vacant; next held by Benjamin Thompson
Political offices
Preceded by John A. Bolles	10th Massachusetts Secretary of the Commonwealth; 1844–1848	Succeeded by William B. Calhoun
