= Lorenzo Sabine =

American politician (1803–1877)

Member of the U.S. House of Representatives from Massachusetts's 4th district
- In office December 13, 1852 – March 3, 1853
- Preceded by: Benjamin Thompson
- Succeeded by: Samuel H. Walley

Member of the Massachusetts House of Representatives
- In office 1833-1834

Personal details
- Born: February 28, 1803 New Concord (now Lisbon), New Hampshire, US
- Died: April 14, 1877 (aged 74) Roxbury, Massachusetts, US
- Resting place: Hillside Cemetery, Eastport, Maine
- Party: Whig

Lorenzo Sabine (February 28, 1803 – April 14, 1877) was a U.S. representative from Massachusetts now more remembered for his research and publishing concerning the Loyalists of the American Revolution than as a public servant.

== Background and early life ==
Born in New Concord (now Lisbon), New Hampshire, Sabine moved to Boston, Massachusetts, with his parents in 1811 and to Hampden, Maine, in 1814. He completed preparatory studies. At the age of eighteen, he moved to Eastport, Maine, and became employed as a clerk and afterwards engaged in mercantile pursuits. He was editor of the Eastport Sentinel, founder of the Eastport Lyceum, and incorporator of Eastport Academy and Eastport Athenaeum. He served as member of the Maine House of Representatives in 1833 and 1834; and as deputy collector of customs in Eastport from 1841 to 1843.

He moved to Framingham, Massachusetts, in 1848, having been appointed a trial justice. Sabine was elected as a Whig to the Thirty-second Congress to fill the vacancy caused by the death of Benjamin Thompson and served from December 13, 1852, to March 3, 1853. He was not a candidate for the Thirty-third Congress. He moved to Roxbury, Massachusetts, having been appointed secretary of the Boston Board of Trade. He also served as special agent of the United States Treasury Department.

== Loyalist studies ==
From early childhood, Sabine, in his own words, was "revolution-mad." But, not until 1821, when he moved to Maine and was close enough to pursue his passion, did he realize the great resource available and the profound, for the times, insight that "there was more than one side to the Revolution." Prior to this "every 'Tory' was as bad as bad could be, every 'son of Liberty' as good as possible." During the 1840s, Sabine published the results of his research in the North American Review (the United States' first literary magazine). The article was not well received by "patriotic" Americans. One of the few to applaud his research and publishing was Harvard-based historian Jared Sparks. When the fruits of his labor appeared in 1847 in revised and expanded form as The American Loyalists, or Biographical Sketches of Adherents to the British Crown in The War of the Revolution; Alphabetically Arranged; with a Preliminary Historical Essay a firestorm of controversy erupted.

He died in Roxbury, Massachusetts, April 14, 1877. He was interred in Hillside Cemetery, Eastport, Maine.

== Works ==
- Review of ″1. Speech delivered in the Senate of the United States, Jan. 24, 1839 on the Bill to Abolish the Duty on Salt. By John Davis. National Intelligencer of March 25, 1839. and 2. Reports of the Majority and Minority of the Select Committee on the Origin and Character of Fishing Bounties and Allowances. Read in the Senate of the United States, April 10, 1840. Washington: Blair & Rives, Printers. 1840. pp. 80.″ The North American Review, Vol. 57, Issue No. 120 (July 1843), pp. 58–86. The running title of this work is ″The Fisheries: Cod, Mackerel and Herring.″
- Review of ″Report by Mr. J. P. Kennedy, from the Committee on Commerce. Read and laid upon the Table in the House of Representatives, May 28, 1842. Twenty-seventh Congress, Second Session. 8vo. pp. 63.″ The North American Review, Vol. 57, Issue No. 121 (October 1843), pp. 293–332. The running title of this work is ″Our Commercial History and Policy.″
- Review of ″A History of the Operations of a Partisan Corps, called the Queen's Rangers, commanded by Lieut. Col. J. G. SIMCOE, during the War of the American Revolution; illustrated by ten engraved Plans of Actions. Now first published, with a Memoir of the Author, and other Additions. New York: Bartlett and Welford. 1844. 8vo. pp. 328.″ The North American Review, Vol. 58, Issue No. 123 (April 1844), pp. 261–302. This was the lead article in this issue and the running title of this work is ″Simcoe's Military Journal: The American Loyalists.″
- Review of ″Report of the Land Agent of the Commonwealth of Massachusetts, laid before the Legislature, January 10, 1844. By George W. Coffin. 8vo. pp. 12.″ The North American Review, Vol. 58, Issue No. 125 (October 1844), pp. 261–335. The running title of this work is ″The Forest Lands and the Timber Trade of Maine.″
- The American Loyalists, or Biographical Sketches of Adherents to the British Crown in The War of the Revolution; Alphabetically Arranged; with a Preliminary Historical Essay. Boston, MA: Charles C. Little and James Brown, 1847. vi, 733 pp.
- Life of Edward Preble: Commodore in the Navy of the United States. [Boston, MA: Charles C. Little and James Brown, 1847]. Series 2, Volume 12 of the Library of American Biography edited by Jared Sparks.
- Extract from and Concluding Part of the Speech of Lorenzo Sabine, at Gloucester, on Wednesday Evening, Nov. 9, 1853, on the New Constitution. [Gloucester (Mass.)? : n.p., 1853?]
- Notes on Duels and Dueling, Alphabetically Arranged, with a Preliminary Historical Essay. Second edition. Boston, MA: Crosby, Nicholas, and Company, 1855.
- An Address Before the New England Historic-Genealogical Society, in the Hall of the House of Representatives of Massachusetts, TUESDAY, SEPT. 13TH, 1859. The Hundredth Anniversary of the Death of Major General James Wolfe, with Passages Omitted in the Delivery, and Illustrative Notes and Documents. Boston, MA: A. Williams & Co. for the Society, 1859. 100 pp.
- Notes on Duels and Dueling, Alphabetically Arranged, with a Preliminary Historical Essay. Third edition. Boston, MA: Crosby, Nicholas, and Company, 1859. vi, 425 pp.
- Biographical Sketches of Loyalists of the American Revolution, with an Historical Essay. 2 volumes. Boston, MA: Little, Brown and Company, 1864. Google Books Volume 1——vi, 608 pp. Google Books Volume 2——600 pp.
- Cod and Whale Fisheries. Report of Hon. Thomas Jefferson, Secretary of State, on the Subject of Sod and Whale Fisheries, Made to the House of Representatives, February 1, 1791. Also, Report of Lorenzo Sabine, Esq., on the Principal Fisheries of the American Seas, being part of House Executive Document No. 23, of the Second Session, Thirty-second Congress. [Washington, DC, 1872]. 42d Cong., 2d Sess. House. Misc. Doc. 32.

U.S. House of Representatives
Preceded by Benjamin Thompson	Member of the U.S. House of Representatives from Massachusetts's 4th congressional district December 13, 1852 – March 3, 1853	Succeeded by Samuel H. Walley
