= William Parmenter =

American politician

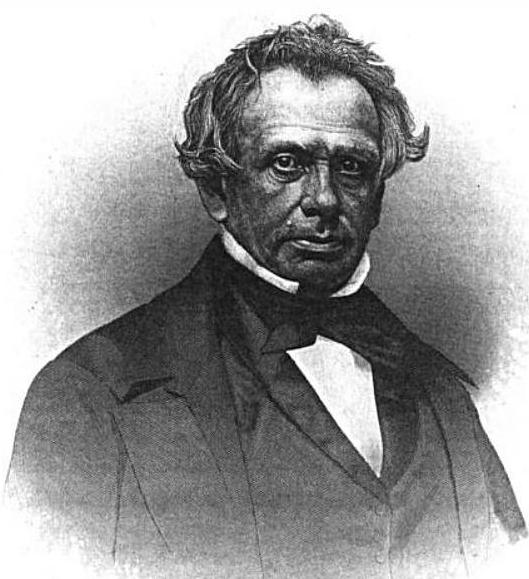

Member of the U.S. House of Representatives from Massachusetts's 4th district
- In office March 4, 1837 – March 3, 1845
- Preceded by: Samuel Hoar
- Succeeded by: Benjamin Thompson

Member of the Massachusetts Senate
- In office 1836

Member of the Massachusetts House of Representatives
- In office 1829

Personal details
- Born: March 30, 1789 Boston, Massachusetts
- Died: February 25, 1866 (aged 76) East Cambridge, Cambridge, Massachusetts
- Party: Democratic
- Occupation: Banker; Businessman

William Parmenter (March 30, 1789 – February 25, 1866) was a United States representative from Massachusetts. He was born in Boston on March 30, 1789. He attended the city's public schools, including the Boston Latin School.

He was a member of the Massachusetts House of Representatives in 1829, served in the Massachusetts State Senate in 1836 and was a Cambridge selectman in 1836. He was manager and agent of the New England Crown Glass Co., and president of the Middlesex Bank. Parmenter was elected as a Democrat to the Twenty-fifth and to the three succeeding Congresses (March 4, 1837 – March 3, 1845), serving as chairman of the Committee on Naval Affairs in the Twenty-eighth Congress. He also served as a naval officer at the port of Boston 1845–1849.

He died in East Cambridge, Massachusetts on February 25, 1866. His interment was in Cambridge Cemetery.

U.S. House of Representatives
Preceded by Samuel Hoar	Member of the U.S. House of Representatives from Massachusetts's 4th congressional district March 4, 1837–March 3, 1845	Succeeded by Benjamin Thompson
