= Massachusetts's 4th congressional district =

U.S. House district for Massachusetts

Coordinates: 41°59′50″N 71°13′39″W

- Interactive map of district boundaries since January 3, 2023
- Representative: Jake Auchincloss; D–Newton
- Population (2025): 808,921
- Median household income: $122,345
- Ethnicity: 77.9% White; 6.7% Asian; 6.1% Hispanic; 4.8% Two or more races; 3.3% Black; 1.2% other
- Cook PVI: D+11

Massachusetts's 4th congressional district is located mostly in southern Massachusetts. It is represented by Democrat Jake Auchincloss. Auchincloss was first elected in 2020.

The district covers much of the area included in the 10th district before the 1992 redistricting. In prior years, the district stretched from Brookline to Fitchburg. The shape of the district underwent some changes effective from the elections of 2012, after Massachusetts congressional redistricting to reflect the 2010 census. Most of Plymouth County and the South Coast are included in the new 9th district. The new 4th district has expanded westward to include towns along the Rhode Island border that had been in the old 3rd district.

For a very brief time (1793–95) it represented part of the District of Maine.

== Geography ==
There are 35 municipalities in the 4th district, as of the 2021 redistricting. This list is sorted by county.

Bristol County (14)

Attleboro, Berkley, Dighton, Fall River, Freetown, Mansfield, North Attleborough, Norton, Raynham (part; also 9th), Rehoboth, Seekonk, Somerset, Swansea, Taunton

Middlesex County (2)

Newton, Sherborn

Norfolk County (13)

Bellingham, Brookline, Dover, Foxborough, Franklin, Medfield, Millis, Needham, Norfolk, Plainville, Sharon, Wellesley (part; also 5th), Wrentham

Plymouth County (1)

Lakeville

Worcester County (5)

Blackstone, Hopedale, Mendon, Milford, Millville

== Recent election results from statewide races ==
Year	Office	Results
2008	President	Obama 61% – 37%
2008	Senate	Kerry 69% – 31%
2010	Senate (Spec.)	Brown 54% – 46%
2010	Governor	Patrick 47% – 45%
2012	President	Obama 59% – 41%
2012	Senate	Warren 51% – 49%
2014	Senate	Markey 60% – 40%
2014	Governor	Baker 51% – 45%
2016	President	Clinton 58% – 35%
2018	Senate	Warren 58% – 39%
2018	Governor	Baker 69% – 31%
2018	Secretary of the Commonwealth	Galvin 69% – 28%
2018	Attorney General	Healey 68% – 32%
2018	Treasurer and Receiver-General	Goldberg 65% – 32%
2018	Auditor	Bump 61% – 32%
2020	President	Biden 63% – 35%
2020	Senate	Markey 63% – 36%
2022	Governor	Healey 62% – 37%
2022	Secretary of the Commonwealth	Galvin 66% – 32%
2022	Attorney General	Campbell 61% – 39%
2022	Auditor	DiZoglio 53% – 40%
2024	President	Harris 58% – 39%
2024	Senate	Warren 56% – 44%

== List of members representing the district ==
Member (District home)	Party	Years	Cong ress	Electoral history	District location
District created March 4, 1789
Theodore Sedgwick (Stockbridge)	Pro-Administration	March 4, 1789 – March 3, 1793	1st 2nd	Elected in 1789. Re-elected in 1790. Redistricted to the 2nd district.	1789–1793; Berkshire County
Henry Dearborn (Gardiner)	Anti-Administration	March 4, 1793 – March 3, 1795 (General ticket)	3rd	Elected in 1793 on the second ballot as part of a three-seat general ticket, representing the district from Lincoln, Hancock, and Washington Counties. Redistricted to the 12th district.	1793–1795; District of Maine
Peleg Wadsworth (Portland)	Pro-Administration	March 4, 1793 – March 3, 1795 (General ticket)	3rd	Elected in 1793 on the third ballot as part of a three-seat general ticket, representing the district from Cumberland County. Redistricted to the 13th district.	1793–1795; District of Maine
George Thatcher (Biddeford)	Pro-Administration	March 4, 1793 – March 3, 1795 (General ticket)	3rd	Redistricted from the 8th district and re-elected in 1792 as part of a three-seat general ticket, representing the district from York County. Redistricted to the 14th district.	1793–1795; District of Maine
Dwight Foster (Brookfield)	Federalist	March 4, 1795 – June 6, 1800	4th 5th 6th	Redistricted from the 2nd district and re-elected in 1794. Re-elected in 1796. Re-elected in 1798. Resigned when elected U.S. Senator.	1795–1803 "4th Western district"
Vacant		June 6, 1800 – December 15, 1800	6th		1795–1803 "4th Western district"
Levi Lincoln Sr. (Worcester)	Democratic-Republican	December 15, 1800 – March 5, 1801	6th 7th	Elected in 1800. Later elected to finish Foster's term. Resigned to become U.S. Attorney General.	1795–1803 "4th Western district"
Vacant		March 5, 1801 – August 24, 1801	7th		1795–1803 "4th Western district"
Seth Hastings (Mendon)	Federalist	August 24, 1801 – March 3, 1803	7th	Elected to finish Lincoln's term and seated January 11, 1802. Redistricted to the 10th district.	1795–1803 "4th Western district"
Joseph Bradley Varnum (Dracut)	Democratic-Republican	March 4, 1803 – June 29, 1811	8th 9th 10th 11th 12th	Redistricted from the 9th district and re-elected in 1802. Re-elected in 1804. Re-elected in 1804. Re-elected in 1806. Re-elected in 1808. Re-elected in 1810. Resigned on election to U.S. Senate.	1803–1823 "Middlesex district"
Vacant		June 29, 1811 – November 4, 1811	12th		1803–1823 "Middlesex district"
William M. Richardson (Groton)	Democratic-Republican	November 4, 1811 – April 18, 1814	12th 13th	Elected to finish Varnum's term. Re-elected in 1812. Resigned to become U.S. Attorney.	1803–1823 "Middlesex district"
Vacant		April 18, 1814 – September 22, 1814	13th		1803–1823 "Middlesex district"
Samuel Dana (Groton)	Democratic-Republican	September 22, 1814 – March 3, 1815	13th	Elected May 23, 1814, to finish Richardson's term. (Seated September 22, 1814.); Lost re-election.	1803–1823 "Middlesex district"
Asahel Stearns (Charlestown)	Federalist	March 4, 1815 – March 3, 1817	14th	Elected in 1814. Lost re-election.	1803–1823 "Middlesex district"
Timothy Fuller (Boston)	Democratic-Republican (Note: Supported the Adams-Clay faction in the 1824 United States presidential election.)	March 4, 1817 – March 3, 1825	15th 16th 17th 18th	Elected in 1816. Re-elected in 1818. Re-elected in 1820. Re-elected in 1822. [data missing]	1803–1823 "Middlesex district"
Timothy Fuller (Boston)	Democratic-Republican	March 4, 1817 – March 3, 1825	15th 16th 17th 18th	Elected in 1816. Re-elected in 1818. Re-elected in 1820. Re-elected in 1822. [data missing]	1823–1833 "Middlesex district"
Edward Everett (Charlestown)	Anti-Jacksonian	March 4, 1825 – March 3, 1835	19th 20th 21st 22nd 23rd	Elected in 1824. Re-elected in 1826. Re-elected in 1828. Re-elected in 1830. Re-elected in 1833. Retired.	1823–1833 "Middlesex district"
Edward Everett (Charlestown)	Anti-Jacksonian	March 4, 1825 – March 3, 1835	19th 20th 21st 22nd 23rd	Elected in 1824. Re-elected in 1826. Re-elected in 1828. Re-elected in 1830. Re-elected in 1833. Retired.	1833–1843 [data missing]
Samuel Hoar (Concord)	Anti-Jacksonian	March 4, 1835 – March 3, 1837	24th	Elected in 1834. Lost re-election.	1833–1843 [data missing]
William Parmenter (Cambridge)	Democratic	March 4, 1837 – March 3, 1845	25th 26th 27th 28th	Elected in 1836. Re-elected in 1838. Re-elected in 1840. Re-elected in 1842. Lost re-election.	1833–1843 [data missing]
William Parmenter (Cambridge)	Democratic	March 4, 1837 – March 3, 1845	25th 26th 27th 28th	Elected in 1836. Re-elected in 1838. Re-elected in 1840. Re-elected in 1842. Lost re-election.	1843–1853 [data missing]
Benjamin Thompson (Charlestown)	Whig	March 4, 1845 – March 3, 1847	29th	Elected on the second ballot in 1844. Retired.	1843–1853 [data missing]
John G. Palfrey (Cambridge)	Whig	March 4, 1847 – March 3, 1849	30th	Elected in 1846. Lost re-election.	1843–1853 [data missing]
Vacant		March 4, 1849 – March 3, 1851	31st	No candidate received the needed majority of votes in twelve runnings of the 1848 election.	1843–1853 [data missing]
Benjamin Thompson (Charlestown)	Whig	March 4, 1851 – September 24, 1852	32nd	Elected in 1850. Died.	1843–1853 [data missing]
Vacant		September 25, 1852 – December 12, 1852	32nd		1843–1853 [data missing]
Lorenzo Sabine (Framingham)	Whig	December 13, 1852 – March 3, 1853	32nd	Elected to finish Thompson's term. Retired.	1843–1853 [data missing]
Samuel H. Walley (Roxbury)	Whig	March 4, 1853 – March 3, 1855	33rd	Elected in 1852. Lost re-election.	1853–1863 [data missing]
Linus B. Comins (Boston)	Know Nothing	March 4, 1855 – March 3, 1857	34th 35th	Elected in 1854. Re-elected in 1856. [data missing]	1853–1863 [data missing]
Linus B. Comins (Boston)	Republican	March 4, 1857 – March 3, 1859	34th 35th	Elected in 1854. Re-elected in 1856. [data missing]	1853–1863 [data missing]
Alexander H. Rice (Boston)	Republican	March 4, 1859 – March 3, 1863	36th 37th	Elected in 1858. Re-elected in 1860. Redistricted to the 3rd district.	1853–1863 [data missing]
Samuel Hooper (Boston)	Republican	March 4, 1863 – February 14, 1875	38th 39th 40th 41st 42nd 43rd	Redistricted from the 5th district and re-elected in 1862. Re-elected in 1864. Re-elected in 1866. Re-elected in 1868. Re-elected in 1870. Re-elected in 1872. Retired, but died before retirement.	1863–1873 [data missing]
Samuel Hooper (Boston)	Republican	March 4, 1863 – February 14, 1875	38th 39th 40th 41st 42nd 43rd	Redistricted from the 5th district and re-elected in 1862. Re-elected in 1864. Re-elected in 1866. Re-elected in 1868. Re-elected in 1870. Re-elected in 1872. Retired, but died before retirement.	1873–1883 [data missing]
Vacant		February 14, 1875 – March 3, 1875	43rd		1873–1883 [data missing]
Rufus S. Frost (Chelsea)	Republican	March 4, 1875 – July 28, 1876	44th	Elected in 1874. Election challenged by successor.	1873–1883 [data missing]
Josiah G. Abbott (Boston)	Democratic	July 28, 1876 – March 3, 1877	44th	Successfully challenged predecessor. Lost re-election.	1873–1883 [data missing]
Leopold Morse (Boston)	Democratic	March 4, 1877 – March 3, 1883	45th 46th 47th	Elected in 1876. Re-elected in 1878. Re-elected in 1880. Redistricted to the 5th district.	1873–1883 [data missing]
Patrick A. Collins (Boston)	Democratic	March 4, 1883 – March 3, 1889	48th 49th 50th	Elected in 1882. Re-elected in 1884. Re-elected in 1886. Retired.	1883–1893 [data missing]
Joseph H. O'Neil (Boston)	Democratic	March 4, 1889 – March 3, 1893	51st 52nd	Elected in 1888. Re-elected in 1890. Redistricted to the 9th district.	1883–1893 [data missing]
Lewis D. Apsley (Hudson)	Republican	March 4, 1893 – March 3, 1897	53rd 54th	Elected in 1892. Re-elected in 1894. Retired.	1893–1903 [data missing]
George W. Weymouth (Fitchburg)	Republican	March 4, 1897 – March 3, 1901	55th 56th	Elected in 1896. Re-elected in 1898. Retired.	1893–1903 [data missing]
Charles Q. Tirrell (Natick)	Republican	March 4, 1901 – July 31, 1910	57th 58th 59th 60th 61st	Elected in 1900. Re-elected in 1902. Re-elected in 1904. Re-elected in 1906. Re-elected in 1908. Died.	1893–1903 [data missing]
Charles Q. Tirrell (Natick)	Republican	March 4, 1901 – July 31, 1910	57th 58th 59th 60th 61st	Elected in 1900. Re-elected in 1902. Re-elected in 1904. Re-elected in 1906. Re-elected in 1908. Died.	1903–1913 [data missing]
Vacant		August 1, 1910 – November 8, 1910	61st		1903–1913 [data missing]
John Joseph Mitchell (Marlborough)	Democratic	November 8, 1910 – March 3, 1911	61st	Elected to finish Tirrell's term. Lost election to the next term.	1903–1913 [data missing]
William H. Wilder (Gardner)	Republican	March 4, 1911 – March 3, 1913	62nd	Elected in 1910. Redistricted to the 3rd district.	1903–1913 [data missing]
Samuel Winslow (Worcester)	Republican	March 4, 1913 – March 3, 1925	63rd 64th 65th 66th 67th 68th	Elected in 1912. Re-elected in 1914. Re-elected in 1916. Re-elected in 1918. Re-elected in 1920. Re-elected in 1922. Retired.	1913–1923 [data missing]
Samuel Winslow (Worcester)	Republican	March 4, 1913 – March 3, 1925	63rd 64th 65th 66th 67th 68th	Elected in 1912. Re-elected in 1914. Re-elected in 1916. Re-elected in 1918. Re-elected in 1920. Re-elected in 1922. Retired.	1923–1933 [data missing]
George R. Stobbs (Worcester)	Republican	March 4, 1925 – March 3, 1931	69th 70th 71st	Elected in 1924. Re-elected in 1926. Re-elected in 1928. Retired.	1923–1933 [data missing]
Pehr G. Holmes (Worcester)	Republican	March 4, 1931 – January 3, 1947	72nd 73rd 74th 75th 76th 77th 78th 79th	Elected in 1930. Re-elected in 1932. Re-elected in 1934. Re-elected in 1936. Re-elected in 1938. Re-elected in 1940. Re-elected in 1942. Re-elected in 1944. Lost re-election.	1923–1933 [data missing]
Pehr G. Holmes (Worcester)	Republican	March 4, 1931 – January 3, 1947	72nd 73rd 74th 75th 76th 77th 78th 79th	Elected in 1930. Re-elected in 1932. Re-elected in 1934. Re-elected in 1936. Re-elected in 1938. Re-elected in 1940. Re-elected in 1942. Re-elected in 1944. Lost re-election.	1933–1943 [data missing]
Pehr G. Holmes (Worcester)	Republican	March 4, 1931 – January 3, 1947	72nd 73rd 74th 75th 76th 77th 78th 79th	Elected in 1930. Re-elected in 1932. Re-elected in 1934. Re-elected in 1936. Re-elected in 1938. Re-elected in 1940. Re-elected in 1942. Re-elected in 1944. Lost re-election.	1943–1953 [data missing]
Harold Donohue (Worcester)	Democratic	January 3, 1947 – January 3, 1973	80th 81st 82nd 83rd 84th 85th 86th 87th 88th 89th 90th 91st 92nd	Elected in 1946. Re-elected in 1948. Re-elected in 1950. Re-elected in 1952. Re-elected in 1954. Re-elected in 1956. Re-elected in 1958. Re-elected in 1960. Re-elected in 1962. Re-elected in 1964. Re-elected in 1966. Re-elected in 1968. Re-elected in 1970. Redistricted to the 3rd district.	1943–1953 [data missing]
Harold Donohue (Worcester)	Democratic	January 3, 1947 – January 3, 1973	80th 81st 82nd 83rd 84th 85th 86th 87th 88th 89th 90th 91st 92nd	Elected in 1946. Re-elected in 1948. Re-elected in 1950. Re-elected in 1952. Re-elected in 1954. Re-elected in 1956. Re-elected in 1958. Re-elected in 1960. Re-elected in 1962. Re-elected in 1964. Re-elected in 1966. Re-elected in 1968. Re-elected in 1970. Redistricted to the 3rd district.	1953–1963 [data missing]
Harold Donohue (Worcester)	Democratic	January 3, 1947 – January 3, 1973	80th 81st 82nd 83rd 84th 85th 86th 87th 88th 89th 90th 91st 92nd	Elected in 1946. Re-elected in 1948. Re-elected in 1950. Re-elected in 1952. Re-elected in 1954. Re-elected in 1956. Re-elected in 1958. Re-elected in 1960. Re-elected in 1962. Re-elected in 1964. Re-elected in 1966. Re-elected in 1968. Re-elected in 1970. Redistricted to the 3rd district.	1963–1973 [data missing]
Robert Drinan (Newton)	Democratic	January 3, 1973 – January 3, 1981	93rd 94th 95th 96th	Redistricted from the 3rd district and re-elected in 1972. Re-elected in 1974. Re-elected in 1976. Re-elected in 1978. Retired after Pope John Paul II ordered all priests to withdraw from electoral politics.	1973–1983 [data missing]
Barney Frank (Newton)	Democratic	January 3, 1981 – January 3, 2013	97th 98th 99th 100th 101st 102nd 103rd 104th 105th 106th 107th 108th 109th 110th 111th 112th	Elected in 1980. Re-elected in 1982. Re-elected in 1984. Re-elected in 1986. Re-elected in 1988. Re-elected in 1990. Re-elected in 1992. Re-elected in 1994. Re-elected in 1996. Re-elected in 1998. Re-elected in 2000. Re-elected in 2002. Re-elected in 2004. Re-elected in 2006. Re-elected in 2008. Re-elected in 2010. Retired.	1973–1983 [data missing]
Barney Frank (Newton)	Democratic	January 3, 1981 – January 3, 2013	97th 98th 99th 100th 101st 102nd 103rd 104th 105th 106th 107th 108th 109th 110th 111th 112th	Elected in 1980. Re-elected in 1982. Re-elected in 1984. Re-elected in 1986. Re-elected in 1988. Re-elected in 1990. Re-elected in 1992. Re-elected in 1994. Re-elected in 1996. Re-elected in 1998. Re-elected in 2000. Re-elected in 2002. Re-elected in 2004. Re-elected in 2006. Re-elected in 2008. Re-elected in 2010. Retired.	1983–1993 [data missing]
Barney Frank (Newton)	Democratic	January 3, 1981 – January 3, 2013	97th 98th 99th 100th 101st 102nd 103rd 104th 105th 106th 107th 108th 109th 110th 111th 112th	Elected in 1980. Re-elected in 1982. Re-elected in 1984. Re-elected in 1986. Re-elected in 1988. Re-elected in 1990. Re-elected in 1992. Re-elected in 1994. Re-elected in 1996. Re-elected in 1998. Re-elected in 2000. Re-elected in 2002. Re-elected in 2004. Re-elected in 2006. Re-elected in 2008. Re-elected in 2010. Retired.	1993–2003 [data missing]
Barney Frank (Newton)	Democratic	January 3, 1981 – January 3, 2013	97th 98th 99th 100th 101st 102nd 103rd 104th 105th 106th 107th 108th 109th 110th 111th 112th	Elected in 1980. Re-elected in 1982. Re-elected in 1984. Re-elected in 1986. Re-elected in 1988. Re-elected in 1990. Re-elected in 1992. Re-elected in 1994. Re-elected in 1996. Re-elected in 1998. Re-elected in 2000. Re-elected in 2002. Re-elected in 2004. Re-elected in 2006. Re-elected in 2008. Re-elected in 2010. Retired.	2003–2013
Joe Kennedy III (Newton)	Democratic	January 3, 2013 – January 3, 2021	113th 114th 115th 116th	Elected in 2012. Re-elected in 2014. Re-elected in 2016. Re-elected in 2018. Retired to run for U.S. senator.	2013–2023
Jake Auchincloss (Newton)	Democratic	January 3, 2021 – present	117th 118th 119th	Elected in 2020. Re-elected in 2022. Re-elected in 2024. Re-elected in 2026.	2013–2023
Jake Auchincloss (Newton)	Democratic	January 3, 2021 – present	117th 118th 119th	Elected in 2020. Re-elected in 2022. Re-elected in 2024. Re-elected in 2026.	2023–present

== Recent election results ==
=== 2002 ===
U.S. House election, 2002: Massachusetts, District 4
Party	Candidate	Votes	%	±%
Democratic	Barney Frank (incumbent)	166,125	98.99	+24.09
Write-in		1,691	1.01	+0.96
Turnout		167,816	100	–

=== 2004 ===
U.S. House election, 2004: Massachusetts, District 4
Party	Candidate	Votes	%	±%
Democratic	Barney Frank (incumbent)	219,260	77.74	−21.25
Independent	Chuck Morse	62,293	22.09	+22.09
Write-in		486	0.17	−0.84
Turnout		282,039	100	–

=== 2006 ===
U.S. House election, 2006: Massachusetts, District 4
Party	Candidate	Votes	%	±%
Democratic	Barney Frank (incumbent)	176,513	98.48	+20.74
Write-in		2,730	1.52	+1.35
Turnout		179,243	100	–

=== 2008 ===
U.S. House election, 2008: Massachusetts, District 4
Party	Candidate	Votes	%	±%
Democratic	Barney Frank (incumbent)	203,032	64.3	−34.18
Republican	Earl Henry Sholley	75,571	23.9	+23.9
Independent	Susan Allen	19,848	6.29	+6.29
Write-in		337	0.11	−1.41
Blank/Scattering		16,946	5.37	+5.37
Turnout		315,734	100	–

=== 2010 ===
U.S. House election, 2010: Massachusetts, District 4
Party	Candidate	Votes	%	±%
Democratic	Barney Frank (incumbent)	126,194	53.9	−10.4
Republican	Sean Bielat	101,517	43.4	+19.5
Independent	Susan Allen	3,445	1.5	−4.79
Independent	Donald Jordan	2,873	1.2	+1.2
Turnout		234,029	100	–

=== 2012 ===
U.S. House election, 2012: Massachusetts, District 4
Party	Candidate	Votes	%	±%
Democratic	Joe Kennedy III	219,499	61.1	+7.2
Republican	Sean Bielat	129,243	36.0	−7.4
Independent	David Rosa	10,674	2.9	+0.2
Turnout		356,416	100	–

=== 2014 ===
Massachusetts's 4th Congressional District, 2014
Party	Candidate	Votes	%
Democratic	Joe Kennedy III (incumbent)	184,158	97.91
No party	All Others	3,940	2.09
Total votes		188,098	100
Democratic hold			

=== 2016 ===
U.S. House election, 2016: Massachusetts, District 4
Party	Candidate	Votes	%	±%
Democratic	Joe Kennedy III (incumbent)	265,823	70.1	+9
Republican	David Rosa	113,055	29.8	−6.2
Write-in		335	0.1	
Turnout		379,213	100	–

=== 2018 ===
U.S. House election, 2018: Massachusetts, District 4
Party	Candidate	Votes	%
Democratic	Joe Kennedy III (Incumbent)	245,289	97.7
n/a	Write-ins	5,727	2.3
Total votes		251,016	100.0
Democratic hold			

=== 2020 ===
U.S. House election, 2020: Massachusetts, District 4
Party	Candidate	Votes	%
Democratic	Jake Auchincloss	251,102	60.8
Republican	Julie Hall	160,474	38.9
Write-in		1,247	0.3
Total votes		412,823	100.0
Democratic hold			

=== 2022 ===
U.S. House election, 2022: Massachusetts, District 4
Party	Candidate	Votes	%
Democratic	Jake Auchincloss	201,882	96.9
Write-in		6,397	3.1
Total votes		291,569	100.0
Democratic hold			

=== 2024 ===
2024 Massachusetts's 4th congressional district election
Party	Candidate	Votes	%
Democratic	Jake Auchincloss (incumbent)	289,347	97.2
Write-in		8,378	2.8
Total votes		297,725	100.0
Democratic hold			
