= Benjamin Fiske Barrett =

American clergyman

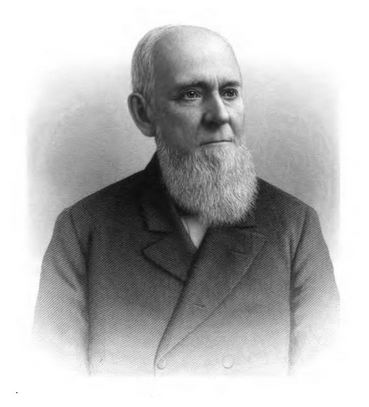
- Born: June 24, 1808; Dresden
- Died: August 6, 1892 (aged 84); Philadelphia
- Occupation: Writer

Benjamin Fiske Barrett (June 24, 1808 – August 6, 1892) was an American clergyman. He has been described as "one of the most able and prolific defenders of Swedenborgian thought in the United States in the nineteenth century."

Benjamin Fiske Barrett was born on June 24, 1808 in Dresden, Maine. He graduated from Bowdoin College and the Cambridge Unitarian Seminary. He adopted the Swedenborgian doctrines. From 1840 to 1848 he officiated as pastor of the New Church Society in New York, and then in Cincinnati until 1850, when he retired from the pulpit, owing to poor health. He pursued a mechanical trade in Chicago, and in four years regained his health and acquired a property. He then took charge of the first Swedenborgian church in Philadelphia, at the same time editing the New Church Monthly. He is the author of A Life of Swedenborg; Lectures on the Doctrines of the New Jerusalem Church (New York, 1842); Lectures on the New Dispensation ; Letters on the Divine Trinity; The Golden Reed (New York, 1855); Catholicity of the New Church; The Visible Church; Beauty for Ashes (1856); Episcopalianism (1871); On Future Life (Philadelphia, 1872); The Golden City; The New Church, its Nature and Whereabout; Swedenborg and Channing; A New View of Hell (1872); Report of the Inquiry into the Allegations against B. F. Barrett (1867); about fifty pamphlets and smaller treatises, and numerous magazine articles. His collected works were issued in Philadelphia (1875). He edited the Swedenborg Library, in twelve volumes, containing the substance of Swedenborg's teachings in extracts (Philadelphia, 1870, et seq.). Benjamin Fiske Barrett died on 6 August 1892 in Philadelphia.
