= Sarah Hammond Palfrey =

American writer (1823–1914)

Sarah Hammond Palfrey (December 11, 1823 – 1914) was an American novelist and poet who used the pseudonym. E. Foxton. She was born in Boston to John Gorham Foxton, a Unitarian minister, and Mary Ann née Hammond Palfrey. She lived in Cambridge, Massachusetts.

Some of her letters survive.

== Writings ==
- Harvest-home
- Old times and new

=== Novels ===
- Herman, or Young Knighthood Volume I and II, Lee and Shepard, Boston 1865
- Agnes Wentworth
- Katherine Morne

=== Poetry ===
- Prémices
- Sir Pavon and St. Pavon
- King Arthur in Avalon
- The Chapel the Chapel; And Other Poems, Christo Et Ecclesia (1880)
- The Light-House
