= Samuel Hoar =

American politician

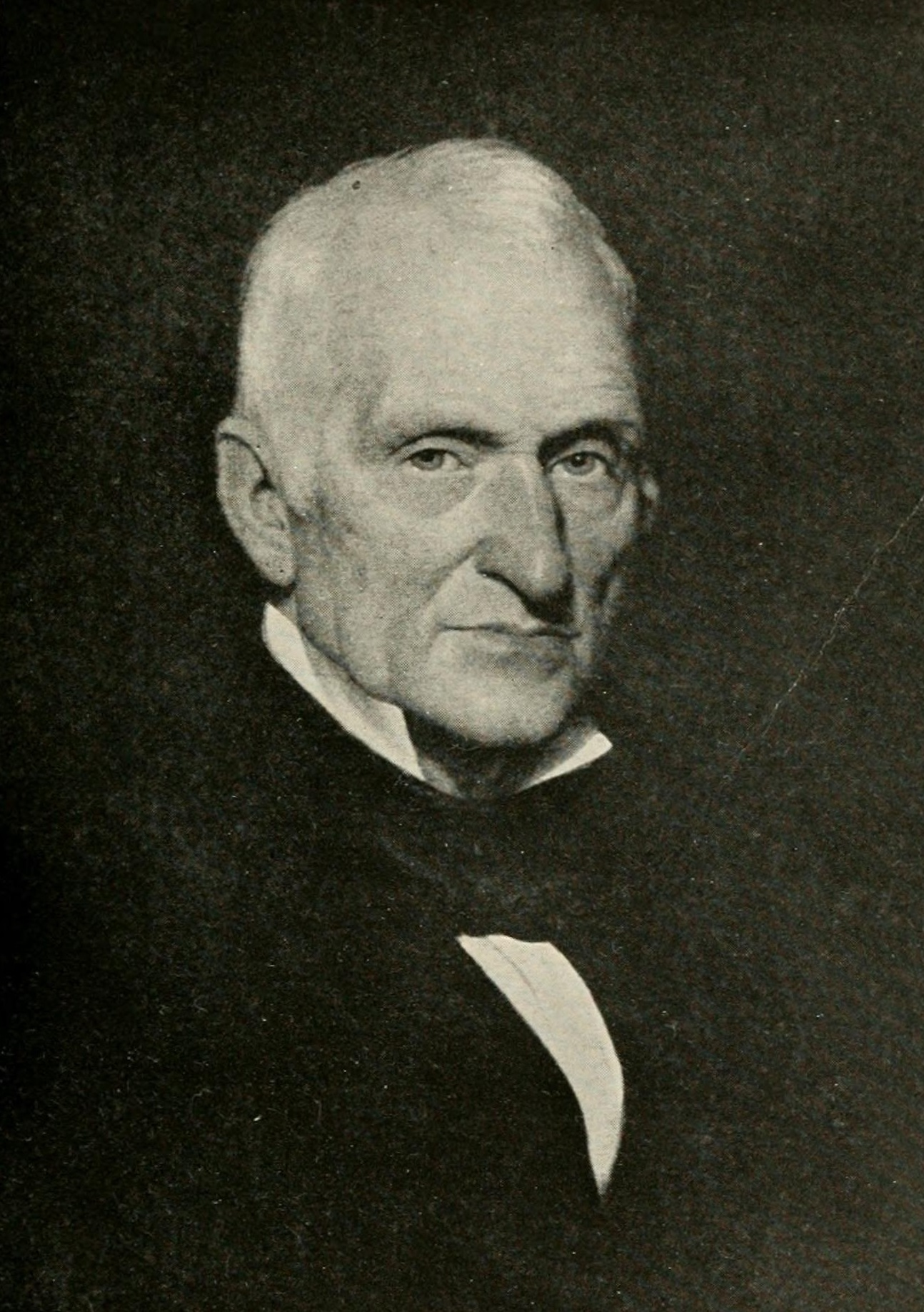

Member of the U.S. House of Representatives from Massachusetts's 4th district
- In office March 4, 1835 – March 3, 1837
- Preceded by: Edward Everett
- Succeeded by: William Parmenter

Member of the Massachusetts House of Representatives
- In office 1850

Member of the Massachusetts Senate
- In office 1826; 1832; 1833

Personal details
- Born: May 18, 1778 Lincoln, Massachusetts, U.S.
- Died: November 2, 1856 (aged 78) Concord, Massachusetts, U.S.
- Party: Anti-Jacksonian; Free Soil; Republican
- Education: Harvard College

Samuel Hoar (May 18, 1778 – November 2, 1856) was an American lawyer and politician. A member of a prominent political family in Massachusetts, he was a leading 19th century lawyer of that state. He was associated with the Federalist Party until its decline after the War of 1812. Over his career, Hoar developed a reputation as a prominent Massachusetts anti-slavery politician and spokesperson. He became a leading member of the Massachusetts Whig Party, a leading and founding member of the Massachusetts Free Soil Party, and a founding member and chair of the committee that organized the founding convention for the Massachusetts Republican Party in 1854.

Hoar may be best known in American history for his 1844 trip to Charleston, South Carolina as an appointed Commissioner of the state of Massachusetts. He went to South Carolina to investigate and contest the laws of that state, which allowed the seizure of sailors who were free African Americans (often who were citizens of Massachusetts) and placed into bondage, if such sailors disembarked from their ship. Hoar was prevented from undertaking his appointed tasks by resolutions of the legislature and efforts of the governor of South Carolina, and was escorted back onto a ship by Charleston citizens fearing mob violence against the agent from Massachusetts. News of the thwarting of Hoar inspired anti-slavery political reaction in Massachusetts.

== Early life ==
Hoar was a born in the town of Lincoln, Massachusetts, and as an adult lived in neighboring Concord, Massachusetts. He graduated from Harvard College in 1802, and was admitted to the bar in 1805. On October 13, 1812, he married Sarah Sherman (1785–1862) of New Haven, Connecticut. Sarah was the youngest child of Roger Sherman and his second wife, Rebecca Minot Prescott. Roger Sherman was a signer of the United States Declaration of Independence and the Constitution.

== Political and legal career ==
Hoar was delegate to the Massachusetts constitutional convention in 1820. He was elected a Fellow of the American Academy of Arts and Sciences in 1824. Hoar served in the State senate in 1826, 1832, and 1833. Elected as an Anti-Jacksonian candidate to the Twenty-fourth Congress (March 4, 1835 – March 3, 1837), he was an unsuccessful candidate for reelection in 1836 to the Twenty-fifth Congress. He was a Massachusetts delegate to the 1839 Whig national party convention. Hoar was an expert on the laws pertaining to waterways, canals and maritime commerce.

=== Massachusetts commissioner to South Carolina, 1844 ===
There was an ongoing constitutional and legal conflict between the state of Massachusetts and the states of South Carolina and Louisiana regarding the seizure of Massachusetts citizens. South Carolina had enacted laws prohibiting the emancipation of slaves, or the entry into the state of free African Americans. South Carolina agents would arrest free African American seamen from Massachusetts, members of the crew aboard ships that arrived at South Carolina sea ports; if the arrestee or the captain of the ship failed to pay fines for the criminal entry into the state, the arrestee would be sold into slavery to pay the fines.

In 1844 the Massachusetts legislature authorized the governor to appoint a Commissioner to reside in Charleston, South Carolina and New Orleans, Louisiana, to collect information as to the number from Massachusetts citizens unlawfully seized in those cities, and to prosecute some of the suits before higher courts for the purpose of testing the constitutionality of the laws under which the forcible seizures were being made. In 1844, Massachusetts governor George N. Briggs (Whig party) appointed Hoar commissioner to South Carolina.

Upon receipt of the letter from Massachusetts Governor Briggs announcing Hoar's appointment, South Carolina Governor James H. Hammond promptly placed it before the South Carolina legislature, which issued several resolves, declaring the right of South Carolina to exclude its borders all persons whose presence might be considered dangerous; denying that free Negroes were citizens of the United States, and for the Massachusetts commissioner:

That his excellency, the governor, be directed to expel from our territory the said agent, after due notice to depart; and that the legislature will sustain the executive authority in any measures that may be adopted for the purpose aforesaid.

The effective result was that Hoar was prevented from appearing before that state's courts to test the law. On his arrival, with daughter Elizabeth Sherman Hoar, in Charleston, December 1844, local citizens warned Hoar to leave town. Local leading citizens secretly escorted the Hoars out of their hotel, to a ship, in advance of feared mob violence. When news of this incident reached Massachusetts it aroused much ire, contributing to a developing sentiment in Massachusetts against slavery and in favor of abolitionism.

Hoar in his report as Massachusetts commissioner stated:

Has the Constitution of the United States the least practical validity or binding force in South Carolina?
She prohibits, not only by lower mobs, but by her legislature, the residence of a free white citizen of Massachusetts within the limits of South Carolina whenever she thinks his presence there inconsistent with her policy. Are the other States of the Union to be regarded as the conquered provinces of South Carolina?

=== Free Soil Party ===
Hoar was elected to the Massachusetts Governor's Council in 1845. In 1848 Hoar chaired the Massachusetts Free Soil Party Convention in Worcester, and was elected to the Massachusetts House of Representatives in 1850, at the age of 72.

=== Republican Party ===
In 1854, he chaired a committee which issued an announcement, summoning leading anti-slavery politicians and citizens to a meeting at the American House in Boston (July 7, 1854), to discuss the potential formation of a new party and to organize a state convention. Anger over the Kansas-Nebraska Act, and the issue of slavery in Federal territories were motivating factors leading to the subsequent convention in Worcester. The mass convention of 2,500 people, held in open air on the common in Worcester, September 7, 1854, founded the Massachusetts Republican Party, principally from members of the Massachusetts Free Soil Party, with a few Whig Party, and anti-slavery Democrats. The Massachusetts Free Soil Party in its Springfield convention, on October 17, 1854, voted to adopt the Republican candidates, and to merge into the new Republican organization.

In 1855, at the age of 77, Hoar was appointed chair of a Massachusetts Republican committee to organize mass assemblage or convention, to consider and promote actions might be taken by Massachusetts citizens against the pro-slavery violence in the recent Kansas elections (subsequently known as Bleeding Kansas), with the intent of unifying with all anti-slavery citizens of Massachusetts in national anti-slavery efforts

== Leading citizen of Concord ==
Hoar was a co-founder of the first Concord Academy, which had a 41-year existence (1822–1863).

== Hoar family ==
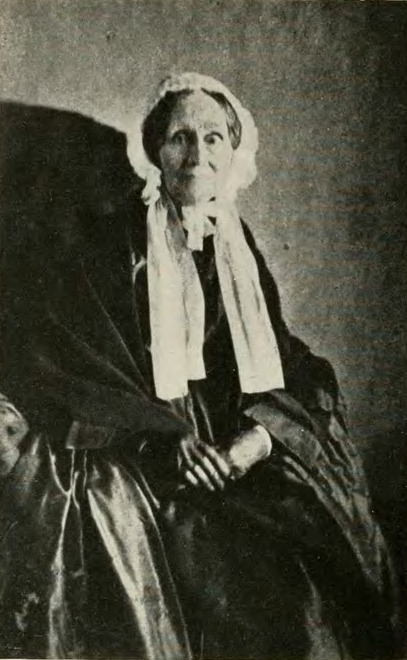
Sarah Sherman Hoar

Samuel and Sarah Hoar had five surviving children (of six offspring); several led influential or prominent lives.

- Elizabeth Sherman Hoar (July 14, 1814 – April 7, 1878) was engaged to Charles Chauncy Emerson (1808–1836), youngest brother of Ralph Waldo Emerson and young law partner of Samuel Hoar; Charles died of tuberculosis before they could marry, and she never married. She was an intimate of the Emerson, Hawthorne and Thoreau families. R.W. Emerson invited Elizabeth into the Transcendentalist community, and she aided in producing their journal, The Dial.
- Ebenezer Rockwood Hoar (1816–1895) (Harvard class of 1835) was Associate Justice of the Massachusetts Supreme Judicial Court, and US Attorney General for President Ulysses Grant; later nominated to the U.S. Supreme Court by Grant, but the nomination was not approved by the Senate; he married Caroline Brooks of Concord.
- Sarah Sherman Hoar (1817–1907) married Robert Boyd Storer (1796–1870), a Boston, Massachusetts importer trading with Russia, and Russian Consul at Boston.
- Samuel Johnson Hoar (February 4, 1820 – January 10, 1821), died in infancy.
- Edward Sherman Hoar (1823–1893) (Harvard class of 1844), married childhood neighbor Elizabeth Hallet Prichard of Concord, and was an intimate of Henry David Thoreau (the Thoreau family lived across Main Street from the Hoars, in several different houses over the years). Edward with H.D. Thoreau accidentally allowed a cooking fire to get out of control, and caused more than 100 acres (400,000 m^{2}) of forest to burn on April 30, 1844, along the Sudbury River in the Fairhaven Bay section of Concord. Edward accompanied Thoreau on some of Thoreau's hiking and canoeing excursions. Edward Sherman was a California state district attorney for the fourth judicial district in 1850. He returned to Massachusetts in 1857. His extensive collection of pressed plants collected mostly from Concord, Massachusetts, including a significant number of specimens that Thoreau left to him, were donated by his daughter in 1912 to the New England Botanical Club herbarium housed at Harvard University.
- George Frisbie Hoar (1826–1904) (Harvard class of 1845) moved to Worcester, Massachusetts as a young adult, and became a prominent U.S. Senator representing Massachusetts for 27 years, from 1877 until his death.

== Other Hoar family members named Samuel Hoar ==
The Hoar family, a prominent political family in Massachusetts, has had a number of individuals named Samuel Hoar since the 18th century:

- His father, Samuel Hoar (1743–1832), was a lieutenant of the Lincoln, Massachusetts company at the Concord battle on April 19, 1775. For many years a member of the Massachusetts General Court as a representative and senator, and a member in the 1820–1821 Massachusetts Constitutional Convention.
- Son, Samuel Johnson Hoar (February 4, 1820 – January 10, 1821) died in infancy
  - Samuel Hoar (1845–1904), son of Ebenezer Rockwood Hoar, was editor of the American Law Review from 1873 to 1879. In 1887 he became general counsel for the Boston and Albany Railroad Company.
    - His son, Samuel Hoar (1887–1952), was a partner in a prominent Boston law firm, called during his lifetime Goodwin, Procter and Hoar. The firm was founded in 1914, and Hoar's name was added in 1917 when Hoar joined the firm. In the 1940s he donated several parcels of land to the federal government, which became the founding kernel of the Great Meadows National Wildlife Refuge on the Concord and Sudbury rivers in Massachusetts. He co-founded a second and still operating Concord Academy in 1922 in Concord, Massachusetts.
      - His son, Samuel Hoar (1927–2004), of Essex, Massachusetts, also was a senior partner in the firm formerly known as Goodwin, Procter and Hoar. As board member of the Conservation Law Foundation (CLF), he was a leading member of the litigation team that compelled the Commonwealth of Massachusetts to comply with federal environmental law, and build appropriate facilities to properly treat sewage discharged into Boston harbor, a legal battle that was most intense from 1983 into the 1990s.
        - His son, Samuel Hoar (born 1955), is a lawyer practicing in Burlington, Vermont. He served as president of the Vermont Bar Association in 2006 and 2007.
          - His son Samuel Rockwood Hoar (born 1988) is a graduate of the Middlesex School in Concord, Massachusetts and a graduate in the class of 2011 of Vermont's Middlebury College.

== Notes ==
U.S. House of Representatives
Preceded by Edward Everett	Member of the U.S. House of Representatives from Massachusetts's 4th congressional district March 4, 1835 – March 3, 1837	Succeeded by William Parmenter
