= Benjamin Thompson (politician) =

American politician

Member of the U.S. House of Representatives from Massachusetts's 4th district
- In office March 4, 1845 – March 3, 1847
- Preceded by: William Parmenter
- Succeeded by: John G. Palfrey
- In office March 4, 1851 – September 24, 1852
- Preceded by: John G. Palfrey
- Succeeded by: Lorenzo Sabine

Member of the Massachusetts House of Representatives
- In office 1830-1831; 1833-1836

Member of the Massachusetts Senate
- In office 1841

Personal details
- Born: August 5, 1798 Boston, Massachusetts, U.S.
- Died: September 24, 1852 (aged 54) Boston, Massachusetts, U.S.
- Party: Whig
- Occupation: Merchant

Benjamin Thompson (August 5, 1798 – September 24, 1852) was a U.S. representative from Massachusetts.

Born in Charlestown, Massachusetts, Thompson attended the public schools, and then engaged in mercantile pursuits. He served as member of the Massachusetts House of Representatives 1830–1831 and 1833–1836. He served in the Massachusetts Senate in 1841.

Thompson was elected as a Whig to the Twenty-ninth Congress (March 4, 1845 – March 3, 1847). He declined to be a candidate for renomination in 1846.

Thompson was elected to the Thirty-second Congress and served from March 4, 1851, until his death in Charlestown, Massachusetts, September 24, 1852. He was interred in the Congressional Cemetery, Washington, D.C.

== See also ==
- List of members of the United States Congress who died in office (1790–1899)

U.S. House of Representatives
Preceded by William Parmenter	Member of the U.S. House of Representatives from Massachusetts's 4th congressional district March 4, 1845 – March 3, 1847	Succeeded by John G. Palfrey
Preceded by John G. Palfrey	Member of the U.S. House of Representatives from Massachusetts's 4th congressional district March 4, 1851 – September 24, 1852	Succeeded by Lorenzo Sabine
