= List of United States representatives in the 29th Congress =

This is a complete list of United States representatives during the 29th United States Congress listed by seniority.

As an historical article, the districts and party affiliations listed reflect those during the 29th Congress (March 4, 1845 – March 3, 1847). Seats and party affiliations on similar lists for other congresses will be different for certain members.

Seniority depends on the date on which members were sworn into office. Since many members are sworn in on the same day, subsequent ranking is based on previous congressional service of the individual and then by alphabetical order by the last name of the representative.

Committee chairmanship in the House is often associated with seniority. However, party leadership is typically not associated with seniority.

Note: The "*" indicates that the representative/delegate may have served one or more non-consecutive terms while in the House of Representatives of the United States Congress.

== U.S. House seniority list ==
U.S. House seniority
Rank	Representative	Party	District	Seniority date (Previous service, if any)	Number of term(s)	Notes
1	John Quincy Adams	W	MA-08	March 4, 1831	8th term	Dean of the House of Representatives
2	James Iver McKay	D	NC-06	March 4, 1831	8th term	
3	Reuben Chapman	D	AL-06	March 4, 1835	6th term	Left the House in 1847.
4	George W. Hopkins	D	VA-13	March 4, 1835	6th term	Left the House in 1847.
5	Robert Rhett	D	SC-07	March 4, 1837	5th term	
6	Linn Boyd	D	KY-01	March 4, 1839; Previous service, 1835–1837.	5th term*	
7	Garrett Davis	W	KY-08	March 4, 1839	4th term	Left the House in 1847.
8	Isaac E. Holmes	D	SC-06	March 4, 1839	4th term	
9	Jacob Thompson	D	MS	March 4, 1839	4th term	
10	Milton Brown	W	TN-11	March 4, 1841	3rd term	Left the House in 1847.
11	John Reeves Jones Daniel	D	NC-07	March 4, 1841	3rd term	
12	John Bennett Dawson	D	LA-03	March 4, 1841	3rd term	Died on June 26, 1845.
13	George S. Houston	D	AL-05	March 4, 1841	3rd term	
14	Edmund Hubard	D	VA-04	March 4, 1841	3rd term	Left the House in 1847.
15	Charles J. Ingersoll	D	PA-04	March 4, 1841; Previous service, 1813–1815.	4th term*	
16	Andrew Kennedy	D	IN-10	March 4, 1841	3rd term	Left the House in 1847.
17	William W. Payne	D	AL-04	March 4, 1841	3rd term	Left the House in 1847.
18	Charles Hudson	W	MA-05	May 3, 1841	3rd term	
19	Joseph R. Ingersoll	W	PA-02	October 12, 1841; Previous service, 1835–1837.	4th term*	
20	Robert C. Winthrop	W	MA-01	November 29, 1842; Previous service, 1840–1842.	5th term*	
21	Joshua R. Giddings	W	OH-20	December 5, 1842; Previous service, 1838–1842.	6th term*	
22	Amos Abbott	W	MA-03	March 4, 1843	2nd term	
23	Joseph H. Anderson	D	NY-07	March 4, 1843	2nd term	Left the House in 1847.
24	Archibald Atkinson	D	VA-01	March 4, 1843	2nd term	
25	Daniel Moreau Barringer	W	NC-02	March 4, 1843	2nd term	
26	Charles S. Benton	D	NY-17	March 4, 1843	2nd term	Left the House in 1847.
27	James Black	D	PA-16	March 4, 1843; Previous service, 1836–1837.	3rd term*	Left the House in 1847.
28	James A. Black	D	SC-01	March 4, 1843	2nd term	
29	James B. Bowlin	D	MO	March 4, 1843	2nd term	
30	Jacob Brinkerhoff	D	OH-11	March 4, 1843	2nd term	Left the House in 1847.
31	Richard Brodhead	D	PA-10	March 4, 1843	2nd term	
32	Joseph Buffington	W	PA-24	March 4, 1843	2nd term	Left the House in 1847.
33	Armistead Burt	D	SC-05	March 4, 1843	2nd term	
34	Charles H. Carroll	W	NY-29	March 4, 1843	2nd term	Left the House in 1847.
35	Augustus A. Chapman	D	VA-12	March 4, 1843	2nd term	Left the House in 1847.
36	Howell Cobb	D	GA-06	March 4, 1843	2nd term	
37	Jacob Collamer	W	VT-02	March 4, 1843	2nd term	
38	Henry Y. Cranston	W	RI-01	March 4, 1843	2nd term	Left the House in 1847.
39	Alvan Cullom	D	TN-04	March 4, 1843	2nd term	Left the House in 1847.
40	John W. Davis	D	IN-06	March 4, 1843; Previous service, 1835–1837 and 1839–1841.	4th term**	Speaker of the House; Left the House in 1847.
41	Paul Dillingham	D	VT-04	March 4, 1843	2nd term	Left the House in 1847.
42	Stephen A. Douglas	D	IL-05	March 4, 1843	2nd term	Resigned on March 3, 1847.
43	George Dromgoole	D	VA-02	March 4, 1843; Previous service, 1835–1841.	5th term*	
44	Robert P. Dunlap	D	ME-02	March 4, 1843	2nd term	Left the House in 1847.
45	Orlando B. Ficklin	D	IL-03	March 4, 1843	2nd term	
46	Solomon Foot	W	VT-01	March 4, 1843	2nd term	Left the House in 1847.
47	Henry D. Foster	D	PA-19	March 4, 1843	2nd term	Left the House in 1847.
48	Henry Grider	W	KY-03	March 4, 1843	2nd term	Left the House in 1847.
49	Hannibal Hamlin	D	ME-06	March 4, 1843	2nd term	Left the House in 1847.
50	Hugh A. Haralson	D	GA-04	March 4, 1843	2nd term	
51	Alexander Harper	W	OH-14	March 4, 1843; Previous service, 1837–1839.	3rd term*	Left the House in 1847.
52	Thomas J. Henley	D	IN-02	March 4, 1843	2nd term	
53	Joseph P. Hoge	D	IL-06	March 4, 1843	2nd term	Left the House in 1847.
54	Orville Hungerford	D	NY-19	March 4, 1843	2nd term	Left the House in 1847.
55	James B. Hunt	D	MI-03	March 4, 1843	2nd term	Left the House in 1847.
56	Washington Hunt	W	NY-34	March 4, 1843	2nd term	
57	Andrew Johnson	D	TN-01	March 4, 1843	2nd term	
58	George W. Jones	D	TN-05	March 4, 1843	2nd term	
59	Daniel P. King	W	MA-02	March 4, 1843	2nd term	
60	Preston King	D	NY-18	March 4, 1843	2nd term	Left the House in 1847.
61	John Henry Lumpkin	D	GA-05	March 4, 1843	2nd term	
62	William B. Maclay	D	NY-04	March 4, 1843	2nd term	
63	George P. Marsh	W	VT-03	March 4, 1843	2nd term	
64	John A. McClernand	D	IL-02	March 4, 1843	2nd term	
65	Robert McClelland	D	MI-01	March 4, 1843	2nd term	
66	Felix Grundy McConnell	D	AL-07	March 4, 1843	2nd term	Died on September 10, 1846.
67	Joseph J. McDowell	D	OH-07	March 4, 1843	2nd term	Left the House in 1847.
68	Abraham R. McIlvaine	W	PA-07	March 4, 1843	2nd term	
69	Joseph Morris	D	OH-15	March 4, 1843	2nd term	Left the House in 1847.
70	William A. Moseley	W	NY-32	March 4, 1843	2nd term	Left the House in 1847.
71	Moses Norris, Jr.	D	NH	March 4, 1843	2nd term	Left the House in 1847.
72	Robert D. Owen	D	IN-01	March 4, 1843	2nd term	Left the House in 1847.
73	John Pettit	D	IN-08	March 4, 1843	2nd term	
74	Joseph Hopkins Peyton	W	TN-08	March 4, 1843	2nd term	Died on November 11, 1845.
75	Alexander Ramsey	W	PA-14	March 4, 1843	2nd term	Left the House in 1847.
76	George O. Rathbun	D	NY-25	March 4, 1843	2nd term	Left the House in 1847.
77	David Settle Reid	D	NC-03	March 4, 1843	2nd term	Left the House in 1847.
78	James H. Relfe	D	MO	March 4, 1843	2nd term	Left the House in 1847.
79	John Ritter	D	PA-09	March 4, 1843	2nd term	Left the House in 1847.
80	Robert W. Roberts	D	MS	March 4, 1843	2nd term	Left the House in 1847.
81	Julius Rockwell	W	MA-07	March 4, 1843	2nd term	
82	Robert C. Schenck	W	OH-03	March 4, 1843	2nd term	
83	Henry St. John	D	OH-06	March 4, 1843	2nd term	Left the House in 1847.
84	Luther Severance	W	ME-03	March 4, 1843	2nd term	Left the House in 1847.
85	Richard F. Simpson	D	SC-02	March 4, 1843	2nd term	
86	John Slidell	D	LA-01	March 4, 1843	2nd term	Resigned on November 10, 1845.
87	Albert Smith	W	NY-33	March 4, 1843	2nd term	Left the House in 1847.
88	Caleb B. Smith	W	IN-04	March 4, 1843	2nd term	
89	Robert Smith	D	IL-01	March 4, 1843	2nd term	
90	Thomas Smith	D	IN-03	March 4, 1843; Previous service, 1839–1841.	3rd term*	Left the House in 1847.
91	Andrew Stewart	W	PA-18	March 4, 1843; Previous service, 1821–1829 and 1831–1835.	7th term**	
92	William Taylor	D	VA-11	March 4, 1843	2nd term	Died on January 17, 1846.
93	William Thomasson	W	KY-07	March 4, 1843	2nd term	Left the House in 1847.
94	John W. Tibbatts	D	KY-10	March 4, 1843	2nd term	Left the House in 1847.
95	Daniel R. Tilden	W	OH-19	March 4, 1843	2nd term	Left the House in 1847.
96	Joseph Vance	W	OH-04	March 4, 1843; Previous service, 1821–1835.	9th term*	Left the House in 1847.
97	Samuel Finley Vinton	W	OH-12	March 4, 1843; Previous service, 1823–1837.	9th term*	
98	John Wentworth	D	IL-04	March 4, 1843	2nd term	
99	Horace Wheaton	D	NY-24	March 4, 1843	2nd term	Left the House in 1847.
100	Joseph A. Woodward	D	SC-03	March 4, 1843	2nd term	
101	William Wright	W	NJ-05	March 4, 1843	2nd term	Left the House in 1847.
102	Jacob S. Yost	D	PA-05	March 4, 1843	2nd term	Left the House in 1847.
103	Alexander H. Stephens	W	GA-07	October 2, 1843	2nd term	
104	Joseph Grinnell	W	MA-10	December 7, 1843	2nd term	
105	Cornelius Darragh	W	PA-21	March 26, 1844	2nd term	Left the House in 1847.
106	James Pollock	W	PA-13	April 5, 1844	2nd term	
107	Thomas H. Bayly	D	VA-07	May 6, 1844	2nd term	
108	Isaac E. Morse	D	LA-04	December 2, 1844	2nd term	
109	William L. Yancey	D	AL-03	December 2, 1844	2nd term	Resigned on September 1, 1846.
110	Stephen Adams	D	MS	March 4, 1845	1st term	Left the House in 1847.
111	Lemuel H. Arnold	W	RI-02	March 4, 1845	1st term	Left the House in 1847.
112	George Ashmun	W	MA-06	March 4, 1845	1st term	
113	Edward D. Baker	W	IL-07	March 4, 1845	1st term	Resigned on January 15, 1847.
114	Joshua F. Bell	W	KY-04	March 4, 1845	1st term	Left the House in 1847.
115	Henry Bedinger	D	VA-10	March 4, 1845	1st term	
116	Asa Biggs	D	NC-09	March 4, 1845	1st term	Left the House in 1847.
117	John Blanchard	W	PA-17	March 4, 1845	1st term	
118	William G. Brown, Sr.	D	VA-15	March 4, 1845	1st term	
119	John H. Campbell	W	PA-03	March 4, 1845	1st term	Left the House in 1847.
120	William W. Campbell	W	NY-06	March 4, 1845	1st term	Left the House in 1847.
121	Charles W. Cathcart	D	IN-09	March 4, 1845	1st term	
122	John G. Chapman	W	MD-01	March 4, 1845	1st term	
123	Lucien Bonaparte Chase	D	TN-09	March 4, 1845	1st term	
124	John Smith Chipman	D	MI-02	March 4, 1845	1st term	Left the House in 1847.
125	Henry S. Clark	D	NC-08	March 4, 1845	1st term	Left the House in 1847.
126	William M. Cocke	W	TN-02	March 4, 1845	1st term	
127	John F. Collin	D	NY-11	March 4, 1845	1st term	Left the House in 1847.
128	Albert Constable	D	MD-05	March 4, 1845	1st term	Left the House in 1847.
129	John H. Crozier	W	TN-03	March 4, 1845	1st term	
130	Erastus D. Culver	W	NY-14	March 4, 1845	1st term	Left the House in 1847.
131	John D. Cummins	D	OH-16	March 4, 1845	1st term	
132	Francis A. Cunningham	D	OH-02	March 4, 1845	1st term	Left the House in 1847.
133	Edmund S. Dargan	D	AL-01	March 4, 1845	1st term	Left the House in 1847.
134	Columbus Delano	W	OH-10	March 4, 1845	1st term	Left the House in 1847.
135	John De Mott	D	NY-27	March 4, 1845	1st term	Left the House in 1847.
136	James Dixon	W	CT-01	March 4, 1845	1st term	
137	James C. Dobbin	D	NC-05	March 4, 1845	1st term	Left the House in 1847.
138	Alfred Dockery	W	NC-04	March 4, 1845	1st term	Left the House in 1847.
139	Joseph E. Edsall	D	NJ-04	March 4, 1845	1st term	
140	Samuel S. Ellsworth	D	NY-26	March 4, 1845	1st term	Left the House in 1847.
141	Jacob Erdman	D	PA-06	March 4, 1845	1st term	Left the House in 1847.
142	John H. Ewing	W	PA-20	March 4, 1845	1st term	Left the House in 1847.
143	James J. Faran	D	OH-01	March 4, 1845	1st term	
144	George Fries	D	OH-17	March 4, 1845	1st term	
145	William S. Garvin	D	PA-22	March 4, 1845	1st term	Left the House in 1847.
146	Meredith P. Gentry	W	TN-07	March 4, 1845; Previous service, 1839–1843.	3rd term*	
147	William F. Giles	D	MD-04	March 4, 1845	1st term	Left the House in 1847.
148	Charles Goodyear	D	NY-21	March 4, 1845	1st term	Left the House in 1847.
149	Samuel Gordon	D	NY-10	March 4, 1845; Previous service, 1841–1843.	2nd term*	Left the House in 1847.
150	James Graham	W	NC-01	March 4, 1845; Previous service, 1833–1843.	6th term*	Left the House in 1847.
151	Martin Grover	D	NY-30	March 4, 1845	1st term	Left the House in 1847.
152	Artemas Hale	W	MA-09	March 4, 1845	1st term	
153	James G. Hampton	W	NJ-01	March 4, 1845	1st term	
154	Richard P. Herrick	W	NY-12	March 4, 1845	1st term	Died on June 20, 1846.
155	Henry W. Hilliard	W	AL-02	March 4, 1845	1st term	
156	Elias B. Holmes	W	NY-28	March 4, 1845	1st term	
157	William J. Hough	D	NY-23	March 4, 1845	1st term	Left the House in 1847.
158	John W. Houston	W	DE	March 4, 1845	1st term	
159	Samuel D. Hubbard	W	CT-02	March 4, 1845	1st term	
160	Robert M. T. Hunter	D	VA-08	March 4, 1845; Previous service, 1837–1843.	4th term*	Left the House in 1847.
161	Timothy Jenkins	D	NY-20	March 4, 1845	1st term	
162	James H. Johnson	D	NH	March 4, 1845	1st term	
163	Joseph Johnson	D	VA-14	March 4, 1845; Previous service, 1823–1827, 1833 and 1835–1841.	7th term***	Left the House in 1847.
164	Seaborn Jones	D	GA-02	March 4, 1845; Previous service, 1833–1835.	2nd term*	Left the House in 1847.
165	Thomas B. King	W	GA-01	March 4, 1845; Previous service, 1839–1843.	3rd term*	
166	John W. Lawrence	D	NY-01	March 4, 1845	1st term	Left the House in 1847.
167	Shelton Leake	D	VA-05	March 4, 1845	1st term	Left the House in 1847.
168	Owen D. Leib	D	PA-11	March 4, 1845	1st term	Left the House in 1847.
169	Lewis C. Levin	W	PA-01	March 4, 1845	1st term	
170	Abner Lewis	W	NY-31	March 4, 1845	1st term	Left the House in 1847.
171	Thomas W. Ligon	D	MD-03	March 4, 1845	1st term	
172	Edward H. C. Long	W	MD-06	March 4, 1845	1st term	Left the House in 1847.
173	Barclay Martin	D	TN-06	March 4, 1845	1st term	Left the House in 1847.
174	John Preston Martin	D	KY-06	March 4, 1845	1st term	Left the House in 1847.
175	Moses McClean	D	PA-15	March 4, 1845	1st term	Left the House in 1847.
176	John D. McCrate	D	ME-04	March 4, 1845	1st term	Left the House in 1847.
177	Edward W. McGaughey	W	IN-07	March 4, 1845	1st term	Left the House in 1847.
178	John H. McHenry	W	KY-02	March 4, 1845	1st term	Left the House in 1847.
179	William S. Miller	W	NY-03	March 4, 1845	1st term	Left the House in 1847.
180	Mace Moulton	D	NH	March 4, 1845	1st term	Left the House in 1847.
181	Archibald C. Niven	D	NY-09	March 4, 1845	1st term	Left the House in 1847.
182	Isaac Parrish	D	OH-13	March 4, 1845; Previous service, 1839–1841.	2nd term*	Left the House in 1847.
183	John Pendleton	W	VA-09	March 4, 1845	1st term	
184	Augustus L. Perrill	D	OH-09	March 4, 1845	1st term	Left the House in 1847.
185	Thomas J. Perry	D	MD-02	March 4, 1845	1st term	Left the House in 1847.
186	John S. Phelps	D	MO	March 4, 1845	1st term	
187	Sterling Price	D	MO	March 4, 1845	1st term	Resigned on August 12, 1846.
188	John A. Rockwell	W	CT-03	March 4, 1845	1st term	
189	Joseph M. Root	W	OH-21	March 4, 1845	1st term	
190	John Runk	W	NJ-03	March 4, 1845	1st term	Left the House in 1847.
191	Joseph Russell	D	NY-15	March 4, 1845	1st term	Left the House in 1847.
192	Cullen Sawtelle	D	ME-05	March 4, 1845	1st term	Left the House in 1847.
193	William Sawyer	D	OH-05	March 4, 1845	1st term	
194	John Fairfield Scamman	D	ME-01	March 4, 1845	1st term	Left the House in 1847.
195	Henry J. Seaman	W	NY-02	March 4, 1845	1st term	Left the House in 1847.
196	James Seddon	D	VA-06	March 4, 1845	1st term	Left the House in 1847.
197	Alexander D. Sims	D	SC-04	March 4, 1845	1st term	
198	Leonard Henly Sims	D	MO	March 4, 1845	1st term	Left the House in 1847.
199	Truman Smith	W	CT-04	March 4, 1845; Previous service, 1839–1843.	3rd term*	
200	Frederick P. Stanton	D	TN-10	March 4, 1845	1st term	
201	David A. Starkweather	D	OH-18	March 4, 1845; Previous service, 1839–1841.	2nd term*	Left the House in 1847.
202	John Strohm	W	PA-08	March 4, 1845	1st term	
203	Stephen Strong	D	NY-22	March 4, 1845	1st term	Left the House in 1847.
204	Bannon Goforth Thibodeaux	W	LA-02	March 4, 1845	1st term	
205	Benjamin Thompson	W	MA-04	March 4, 1845	1st term	Left the House in 1847.
206	James Thompson	D	PA-23	March 4, 1845	1st term	
207	Allen G. Thurman	D	OH-08	March 4, 1845	1st term	Left the House in 1847.
208	Robert Toombs	W	GA-08	March 4, 1845	1st term	
209	William Tredway	D	VA-03	March 4, 1845	1st term	Left the House in 1847.
210	Andrew Trumbo	W	KY-09	March 4, 1845	1st term	Left the House in 1847.
211	Hugh White	W	NY-16	March 4, 1845	1st term	
212	William W. Wick	D	IN-05	March 4, 1845; Previous service, 1839–1841.	2nd term*	
213	Hezekiah Williams	D	ME-07	March 4, 1845	1st term	
214	David Wilmot	D	PA-12	March 4, 1845	1st term	
215	Bradford R. Wood	D	NY-13	March 4, 1845	1st term	Left the House in 1847.
216	Thomas M. Woodruff	W	NY-05	March 4, 1845	1st term	Left the House in 1847.
217	William W. Woodworth	D	NY-08	March 4, 1845	1st term	Left the House in 1847.
218	Samuel G. Wright	W	NJ-02	March 4, 1845	1st term	Died on July 30, 1845.
219	Archibald Yell	D	AR	March 4, 1845; Previous service, 1836–1839.	3rd term*	Resigned on July 1, 1846.
220	Bryan Young	W	KY-05	March 4, 1845	1st term	Left the House in 1847.
	Edward C. Cabell	W	FL	October 6, 1845	1st term	Resigned on January 24, 1846.
	George Sykes	D	NJ-02	November 4, 1845; Previous service, 1843–1845.	2nd term*	Left the House in 1847.
	John H. Harmanson	D	LA-03	December 1, 1845	1st term	
	Jefferson Davis	D	MS	December 8, 1845	1st term	Resigned on October 28, 1846.
	Edwin H. Ewing	W	TN-08	January 2, 1846	1st term	Left the House in 1847.
	George W. Towns	D	GA-03	January 5, 1846; Previous service, 1835–1836 and 1837–1839.	3rd term**	Left the House in 1847.
	William H. Brockenbrough	D	FL	January 24, 1846	1st term	Left the House in 1847.
	Emile La Sére	D	LA-01	January 29, 1846	1st term	
	James McDowell	D	VA-11	March 6, 1846	1st term	
	David S. Kaufman	D	TX-01	March 30, 1846	1st term	
	Timothy Pilsbury	D	TX-02	March 30, 1846	1st term	
	Franklin Welsh Bowdon	D	AL-07	December 7, 1846	1st term	
	James La Fayette Cottrell	D	AL-03	December 7, 1846	1st term	Left the House in 1847.
	William McDaniel	D	MO	December 7, 1846	1st term	Left the House in 1847.
	Thomas C. Ripley	W	NY-12	December 7, 1846	1st term	Left the House in 1847.
	Serranus C. Hastings	D	IA	December 28, 1846	1st term	Left the House in 1847.
	Shepherd Leffler	D	IA	December 28, 1846	1st term	
	Henry T. Ellett	D	MS	January 26, 1847	1st term	Left the House in 1847.
	John Henry	W	IL-07	February 5, 1847	1st term	Left the House in 1847.
	Thomas W. Newton	W	AR	February 6, 1847	1st term	Left the House in 1847.

== Delegates ==
Rank	Delegate	Party	District	Seniority date (Previous service, if any)	No.# of term(s)	Notes
1	Augustus C. Dodge	D	IA	October 28, 1840	4th term	
2	Morgan Lewis Martin	D	WI	March 4, 1845	1st term	

== See also ==
- 29th United States Congress
- List of United States congressional districts
- List of United States senators in the 29th Congress
