= Thomas H. Kinnicutt =

American politician from Massachusetts (1800–1858)

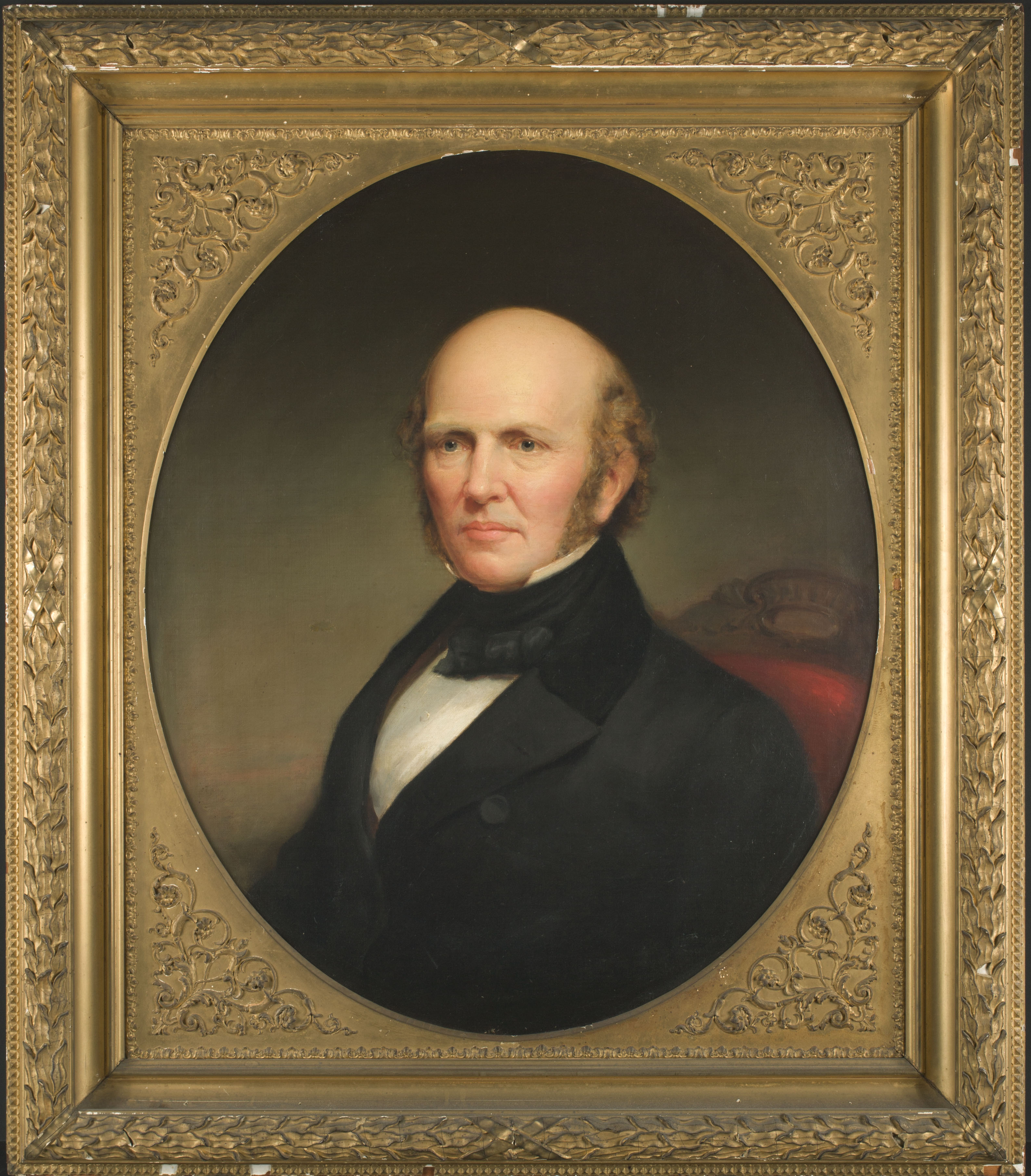

31st & 33rd Speaker of the Massachusetts House of Representatives
- In office January 5, 1842 – March 3, 1842
- Preceded by: George Ashmun
- Succeeded by: Daniel P. King
- In office January 3, 1844 – March 16, 1844
- Preceded by: Daniel P. King
- Succeeded by: Samuel H. Walley

Member of the Massachusetts Senate
- In office January 3, 1838 – April 10, 1839

Member of the Massachusetts House of Representatives for Worcester County
- In office January 7, 1835 – April 20, 1837
- In office January 6, 1841 – March 16, 1844

Personal details
- Born: November 30, 1800 Warren, Rhode Island, US
- Died: January 22, 1858 (aged 57) Worcester, Massachusetts, US
- Party: Whig
- Children: 2
- Education: Leicester Academy, Litchfield Law School & Brown University

Thomas H. Kinnicutt (November 30, 1800 – January 22, 1858) was an American politician who served in the Massachusetts House of Representatives and Massachusetts Senate as a member of the Whig party. He also served as the 31st & 33rd speaker of the house in 1842 and 1844.

== Early life ==
Thomas H. Kinnicutt was born in Warren, Rhode Island on November 30, 1800, to Thomas Kinnicutt and Amy Wightman. He graduated from Brown University in 1822 and the Litchfield Law School in 1825, after which he moved to Worcester, Massachusetts and went on to practice law from 1825 to 1835. He married Harriet Burling (1805–1838) in 1827 and went on to have two children.

== Political career ==
Thomas H. Kinnicutt was first elected as a member of the Massachusetts House of Representatives for Worcester County in 1835. He served two separate terms as a representative for that district from 1835 to 1837 and then again from 1841 to 1844. In between his terms in the Massachusetts House of Representatives, he was elected to the Massachusetts Senate for Worcester County, serving from 1838 to 1839. During the 1841 Massachusetts gubernatorial election, Kinnicutt and 39 other politicians endorsed John Davis for Governor and George Hull for Lieutenant Governor.

After having served as a state senator, and having been re-elected to the Massachusetts House of Representatives to the 63rd Massachusetts General Court, Thomas H. Kinnicutt was elected the 31st speaker of the house on January 5, 1842, with 180 out of the legislation's 336 votes, succeeding fellow Whig speaker George Ashmun. He remained speaker until the start of the 64th Massachusetts General Court, when he was succeeded by fellow Whig politician Daniel P. King. However at the start of the 65th Massachusetts General Court on January 3, 1844, Kinnicutt was re-elected as speaker of the house, a position from which he resigned later that year. He was succeeded by fellow Whig politician Samuel H. Walley.

== Later life and death ==
Thomas H. Kinnicutt became judge of probate of Worcester County in 1848, a position which he held until his death in Worcester, Massachusetts on January 22, 1858.

== See also ==
- List of speakers of the Massachusetts House of Representatives
- Massachusetts House of Representatives

Political offices
| Preceded by George Ashmun | Speaker of the Massachusetts House of Representatives; 1842 | Succeeded by Daniel P. King |
| Preceded by Daniel P. King | Speaker of the Massachusetts House of Representatives; 1844 | Succeeded by Samuel H. Walley |
