= 1844 Massachusetts legislature =

American state legislature

65th Massachusetts General Court
←	64th	66th	→

Overview
- Legislative body: General Court

Senate
- Members: 40
- President: Josiah Quincy Jr.

House
- Members: 321
- Speaker: Thomas H. Kinnicutt, Samuel H. Walley, Jr.

Sessions
- 1st: January 3, 1844 – March 16, 1844

The 65th Massachusetts General Court, consisting of the Massachusetts Senate and the Massachusetts House of Representatives, met in 1844 during the governorship of George N. Briggs. Josiah Quincy Jr. served as president of the Senate. Thomas H. Kinnicutt and Samuel H. Walley, Jr. served as speakers of the House.

== Senators ==
- Jehiel Abbott
- Charles Francis Adams
- Morrill Allen
- Obed Barney
- Asahel Buck Jr.
- Benjamin Burrett
- Linus Child
- Chas. Choate
- Cyrus E. Clark
- Thomas J. Clarke
- Henry H. Cook
- Benjamin F. Copeland
- Polycarpus L. Cushman
- Solomon Davis
- Alexander Dewitt
- John B. Dillingham
- Allen W. Dodge
- Joseph M. Forward
- Johnson Gardner
- Nathaniel Hammond
- Elnathan P. Hathaway
- Stevens Hayward
- Dan Hill
- Alfred Kittredge
- Asa F. Lawrence
- Myron Lawrence
- Levi Lincoln
- Isaac Livermore
- Luther Metcalf
- Jesse Murdock
- Francis S. Newhall
- John C. Park
- Josiah Quincy Jr.
- Joseph Richards
- Jeffrey Richardson
- John Safford
- Royal Southwick
- Solomon Strong
- Wm. Whitaker
- Henry Wilson

== See also ==
- 28th United States Congress
- List of Massachusetts General Courts
