= 1839 Massachusetts legislature =

American state legislature

60th Massachusetts General Court
←	59th	61st	→

Overview
- Legislative body: General Court

Senate
- Members: 40
- President: Myron Lawrence

House
- Members: 521
- Speaker: Robert Charles Winthrop

Sessions
- 1st: January 2, 1839 – April 10, 1839

The 60th Massachusetts General Court, consisting of the Massachusetts Senate and the Massachusetts House of Representatives, met in 1839 during the governorship of Edward Everett. Myron Lawrence served as president of the Senate and Robert Charles Winthrop served as speaker of the House.

On March 9, "72 women, citizens of Boston, petitioned the Legislature for a repeal" of laws banning interracial marriage.

At the time, members required a majority of the popular vote to be declared elected. If no winner was chosen, the General Court voted to resolve the election, usually in favor of whichever party held the majority of seats in the General Court.

== Senators ==
- James Allen
- Samuel T. Armstrong
- George Ashmun
- George Blake
- Reuben Boise, Jr.
- Isaiah Breed
- Stephen B. Brown
- James G. Carter
- Samuel Chandler
- Linus Child
- William Clark, Jr.
- Lilly Eaton
- Lester Filley
- Thomas French
- Samuel G. Goodrich
- Nathan Gurney
- William Hancock
- Ephraim Hastings
- Charles Kimball
- Daniel P. King
- Thomas Kinnicutt
- Samuel Lane
- Myron Lawrence
- Artemas Lee
- Charles Leighton
- Josiah Little
- Charles Marston
- Joseph Meigs
- George Morey
- Stuart J. Park
- Sampson Perkins
- Horatio Pratt
- Josiah Quincy Jr.
- Joseph L. Richardson
- Jeremiah Spofford
- George B. Upton
- Samuel B. Walcott
- Jared Whitman
- Seth Whitmarsh
- Sidney Willard

== See also ==
- 1839 Massachusetts gubernatorial election
- 26th United States Congress
- List of Massachusetts General Courts
