= Senator Ashmun =

Senator Ashmun may refer to:

- Eli P. Ashmun (1770–1819), U.S. Senator from Massachusetts from 1816 to 1818
- George Ashmun (1804–1870), Massachusetts State Senate
