= 1845 Massachusetts legislature =

American state legislature

66th Massachusetts General Court
| ← | 65th | 67th | → |

Overview
- Legislative body: General Court

Senate
- Members: 40
- President: Levi Lincoln

House
- Members: 271
- Speaker: Samuel H. Walley, Jr.

Sessions
- 1st: January 1, 1845 – March 26, 1845

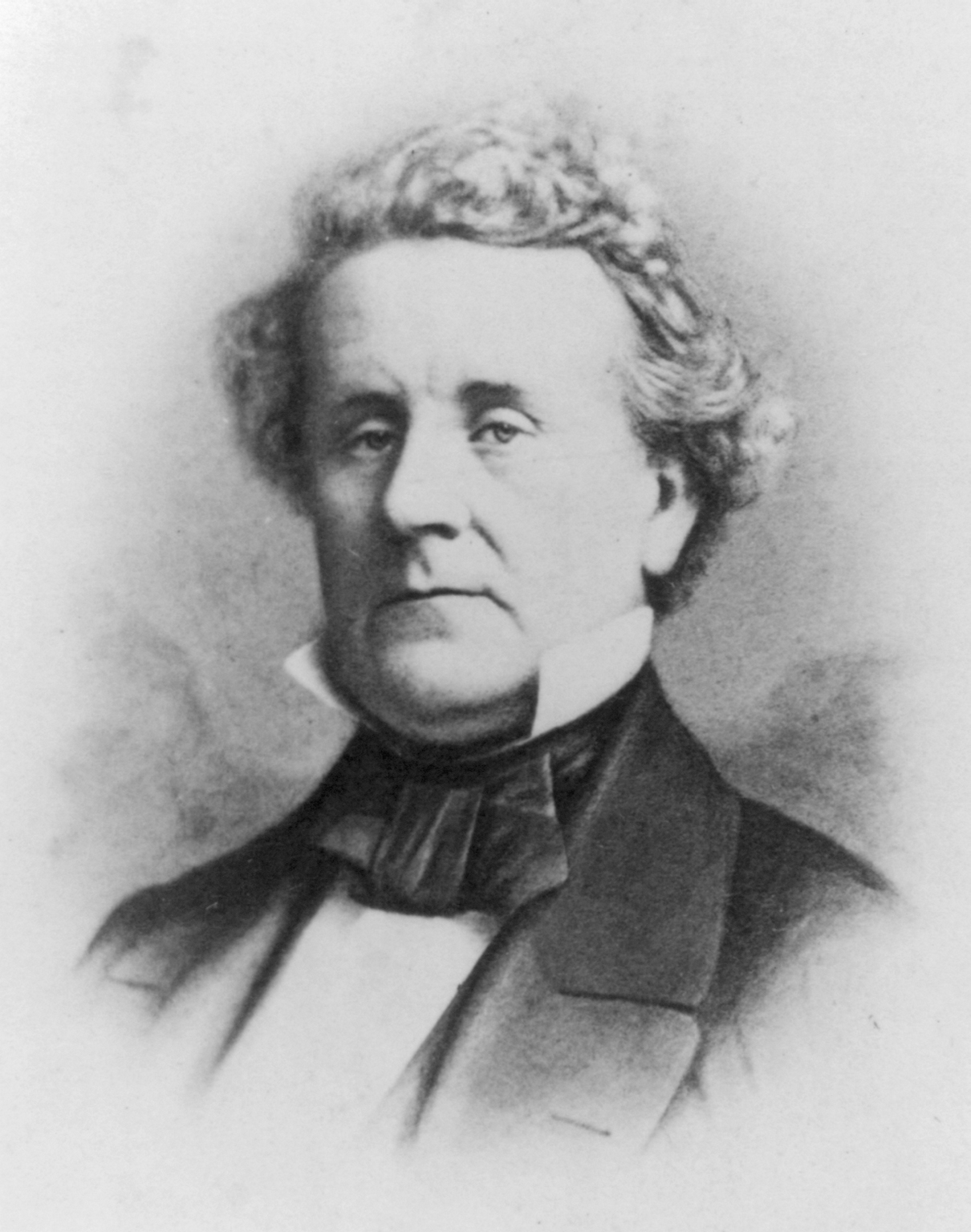
Levi Lincoln, Senate president.

The 66th Massachusetts General Court, consisting of the Massachusetts Senate and the Massachusetts House of Representatives, met in 1845 during the governorship of George N. Briggs. Levi Lincoln served as president of the Senate and Samuel H. Walley, Jr. served as speakers of the House.

== Senators ==
- Jehiel Abbott
- Charles Francis Adams
- Morrill Allen
- Oliver Ames
- Benjamin Barrett
- Nathaniel B. Borden
- Linus Child
- Chas. Choate
- Thomas J. Clarke
- John H. Clifford
- Benjamin F. Copeland
- Solomon Davis
- John B. Dillingham
- Francis B. Fay
- Asahel Foot
- John C. Gray
- Stevens Hayward
- Dan Hill
- Charles W. Hopkins
- Edmund Kimball jr.
- Alfred Kittredge
- Myron Lawrence
- Levi Lincoln
- Isaac Livermore
- Luther Metcalf
- William Mitchell
- Jesse Murdock
- Francis S. Newhall
- John C. Park
- Solomon Reed
- Joseph Richards
- Daniel Safford
- Royal Southwick
- Charles Stearns
- Joseph Stone
- John G. Thurston
- George Wheatland
- James White
- James P. Whitney
- Henry Wilson

== Representatives ==
=== Barnstable County ===
- Joseph Baker
- Charles C. Bearse
- David Benson
- Albert P. Clark
- Samuel P. Croswell
- John Dunlap
- William Handy jr.
- Josiah Hinckley
- Elisha Jenkins
- Alexander Kenrick
- Elijah E. Knowles
- Caleb Lombard
- James Long
- Richard Stevens
- John Taylor

=== Berkshire County ===
- Lewis Beach
- Andrew Bennett
- James Buel
- Prentiss Chaffe
- Thaddeus Clapp
- Isaac Comstock
- Bradish Dunham
- Robert E. Galpin
- Asa Judd
- Martin R. Kellogg
- Bazy W. Pattison
- John Sherril
- David Smith
- Socrates Squire
- Leonard Tuttle

=== Bristol County ===
- Simeon Borden
- William D. Bullock
- Benjamin Cartwright
- James B. Congdon
- Jonathan Davis
- Lincoln Drake
- Forrest Foster
- David R. Greene
- Earl Hodges
- Abraham H. Howland
- Thomas Kempton
- O. S. Kingsbury
- George Kirby
- James B. Luther
- Philip M. Marvel
- Lemuel May
- Ellis Mendall, jr.
- John H. W. Page
- Joseph Pitts
- Cyrell Read
- James Rider
- Grenville Stevens
- Joseph Tripp
- Benjamin F. White
- John Winslow, jr.

=== Dukes County ===
- Matthew P. Butler
- Joseph Mayhew
- Smith Mayhew

=== Essex County ===
- Enoch Bailey
- John I. Baker
- George Barker
- Jonas A. Bettes
- Frederick I. Coffin
- John Coombs
- Peter Dixey, jr.
- Henry Fowler
- William Grover
- Enoch Hale
- Pickmore Jackson
- James Kimball
- Benjamin R. Knapp
- Joseph Little
- John Marland
- Hazen Morse
- Sylvanus Morse
- Richard Osborn
- Ezra Perkins, jr.
- Jonathan C. Perkins
- Caleb Pierce
- Daniel Potter
- Daniel N. Prime
- Allen Putnam
- Benjamin Sawyer
- William Stevens
- John D. Symonds
- Albert Thorndike
- Samuel Todd

=== Franklin County ===
- Nathaniel P. Baker
- Jasper Bement
- Nathan Hosmer
- Horace Hubbard
- Benjamin Mayo
- Charles Osgood
- Jabez Pease
- Frederic Peirce
- Rufus Saxton
- Clark Sears
- Asa Severance
- Amos Stewart
- Daniel W. Temple
- Gardner Wilder
- Simeon H. Williams

=== Hampden County ===
- Alonzo V. Blanchard
- Sharon Bradley
- Hector Campbell
- Jacob Colton, jr.
- Edmund Freeman
- Hiram Harrison
- Chandler Holcomb
- Oliver Moseley
- Frederic Sackett
- Orson Sherman
- Artimas H. Whitney
- Samuel Whitney

=== Hampshire County ===
- Henry A. Bridgman
- Uriah Church
- Robert Dawes, Jr.
- Calvin Goodman
- Joel Hayden
- Erastus Hopkins
- Thomas Jones
- John A. Morton
- William W. Partridge
- Asahel Pierce
- Levi Taylor
- Cullen Warner
- E. Munroe Wright

=== Middlesex County ===
- Shubael P. Adams
- Reuben Bates
- Lambert Bigelow
- George Bragdon
- Josiah Burnam
- Timothy V. Coburn
- Isaac Cooper
- John M. Durgin
- Lilley Eaton
- Abel Gleason
- Joseph Griffin
- Isaac Hagar
- George Harlow
- Stedman Hartwell
- Reuben Haynes
- Leonard Hoar
- Edwin Hobbs
- Thomas Hopkinson
- John A. Knowles
- John S. Ladd
- Luther Lawrence
- Henry H. Learnard
- Isaac S. Lee
- Caleb W. Leland
- John Leland
- Thomas Livermore
- William Livermore, jr.
- Charles R. Metcalf
- John Mixer
- Jesse Phelps
- Daniel Pratt
- Josiah H. Russell
- John Sargrent
- William Schouler
- Calvin Shepard, jr.
- John Sprague
- Joel Walcott
- Daniel Wetherbee

=== Nantucket County ===
- David Baker
- George Harris
- William C. Starbuck
- Charles Wood

=== Norfolk County ===
- Joseph H. Billings
- George Bullard
- Friend Crane
- Joseph Day
- Moses Draper
- Richard Ford
- Samuel Guild
- Thos. Kendall
- Josiah O. Lawrence
- Ralph Sanger
- Samuel H. Walley, jr.
- Naaman L. White

=== Plymouth County ===
- Uriah Bartlett
- John Beal
- George Bonney
- Joshua Brewster, jr.
- Nathan Cannon
- Harrison G. O. Ellis
- Henry French
- David Holmes
- Luther Holmes
- Caleb Howard
- Oren Josselyn
- Samuel Leonard
- Luther Magoun
- Edmund Robbins
- William S. Savery
- Josiah Tinkham
- Asa T. Winslow

=== Suffolk County ===
- Charles Amory
- Daniel Bartlett, jr.
- Richard W. Bayley
- Joseph Bell
- Abraham W. Blanchard
- Luther Blodgett
- Ephraim Buck
- John Codman
- Larra Crane
- Bradley N. Cumings
- William Denton
- Peleg W. Chandler
- Edmund Dwight
- Ebenezer Ellis
- Rowland Ellis
- David Francis
- Nathaniel Francis
- Jabez C. Howe
- William H. Lane
- Ezra Lincoln
- David Morgan
- Joshua Norton, jr.
- John Osborn
- Jonathan Preston
- Samuel Quincy
- Benjamin P. Richardson
- Charles T. Russell
- J. T. Stevenson
- Jedediah Tuttie
- Thomas Tolman
- John B. Tremere
- Charles Wade
- Samuel Wales, jr.
- Joel Wheeler
- William Willett
- Royal B. Willis

=== Worcester County ===
- Joel Barnard
- Eben. D. Blake
- Prince Brackett
- William S. Bradbury
- Alfred Bragg
- Henry Brigham
- Benjamin Brown
- Enoch Brown
- Alexander H. Bullock
- Leonard Burrage
- Henry Chapin
- John T. Cotton
- David Davis
- Eleazer B. Draper
- Franklin Drury
- John Milton Earle
- Hiram Edson
- Israel Everett
- Peter Fay
- Jacob Fisher
- Samuel Houghton
- Jonas Howe
- Theodore Jones
- Ithra Lewis
- William Marble
- Moses G. Maynard
- Erastus Ormsbee
- Brigham Prescott
- Warham Rand
- Darius Rice
- Solomon Robinson
- Welcome Staples
- Jonathan Warren
- Calvin Willard
- Zadok Woodbury
- John Woodcock
- Joseph Wright

== See also ==
- 28th United States Congress
- List of Massachusetts General Courts
