= 1838 Massachusetts legislature =

American state legislature

59th Massachusetts General Court
←	58th	60th	→

Overview
- Legislative body: General Court

Senate
- Members: 40
- President: Myron Lawrence

House
- Members: 480
- Speaker: Robert Charles Winthrop

Sessions
- 1st: January 3, 1838 – April 25, 1838

The 59th Massachusetts General Court, consisting of the Massachusetts Senate and the Massachusetts House of Representatives, met in 1838 during the governorship of Edward Everett. Myron Lawrence served as president of the Senate and Robert Charles Winthrop served as speaker of the House.

The governor spoke to the members on January 9, 1838.

"In February 1838, Angelina Grimké became the first woman in U.S. history to address the members of an American legislative body when she spoke to the members of the Massachusetts Legislature. Her subject was the demand for the immediate end of the slave trade in Washington, D.C."

In 1838, temperance activists pushed the Massachusetts legislature to pass a law restricting the sale of alcohol in quantities less than fifteen gallons.

== Senators ==
- Daniel Adams III
- James C. Alvord
- George Ashmun
- Reuben Boies Jr.
- Nathan Brooks
- Stephen B. Brown
- Barker Burnell
- James G. Carter
- Linus Child
- William Clark Jr.
- Samuel Dorr
- Lilly Eaton
- John Eddy
- Stephen Fairbanks
- Levi Farwell
- Lester Filley
- Thomas French
- Samuel G. Goodrich
- Nathan Gurney
- William Hancock
- Samuel Hubbard
- Charles Hudson
- Charles Kimball
- Daniel P. King
- Thomas Kinnicutt
- Samuel Lane
- Myron Lawrence
- Artemas Lee
- Charles Marston
- Lemuel May
- Joseph Meigs
- Thomas Motley
- Warwick Palfray Jr.
- Stuart J. Park
- Josiah Quincy Jr.
- Joseph L. Richardson
- John A. Shaw
- Jeremiah Spofford
- Samuel B. Walcutt
- Charles H. Warren

== Representatives ==
- Ivers J. Austin

== See also ==
- 25th United States Congress
- List of Massachusetts General Courts
