= 1840 Massachusetts legislature =

State legislature

61st Massachusetts General Court
←	60th (1839)	62nd (1841)	→
- Seal of the General Court of Massachusetts

Overview
- Legislative body: Massachusetts General Court
- Term: January 1, 1840 – January 6, 1841

Senate
- Members: 40
- President: Daniel P. King
- Party control: Whig

House
- Members: 521
- Speaker: Robert Charles Winthrop
- Party control: Whig

Sessions
- 1st: January 1, 1840 – March 24, 1840

The 61st Massachusetts General Court, consisting of the Massachusetts Senate and the Massachusetts House of Representatives, met in 1840 during the governorship of Marcus Morton. Daniel P. King served as president of the Senate and Robert Charles Winthrop served as speaker of the House.

On January 22, 1840, the governor gave a speech.

== Composition by party ==
Overview of Senate membership by party
Begin (January 1, 1840)
	Party (shading shows control)		Total	Vacant
	Democratic (D)	Whig (W)	Total	Vacant
Begin (January 1, 1840)	19	21	40	0
Latest voting share	47.50%	52.50%		

== Leadership ==
=== Senate ===
==== Presiding ====
- President: Daniel P. King (W)

=== House of Representatives ===
==== Presiding ====
- Speaker: Robert Charles Winthrop (W)

== Members ==
=== Senate ===
The 40 seats are apportioned to each county or counties, based upon population size, to be elected at-large.

==== Barnstable ====
▌At-large. Charles Marsten (W)

==== Berkshire ====
▌At-large. Russell Brown (D)
▌At-large. Increase Sumner (D)

==== Bristol ====
▌At-large. Foster Hooper (D)
▌At-large. Horatio Pratt (D)
▌At-large. Seth Whitmarsh (D)

==== Dukes and Nantucket ====
▌At-large. George B. Upton (W)

==== Essex ====
▌At-large. Amos Abbott (W)
▌At-large. David Choate (W)
▌At-large. Daniel P. King (W)
▌At-large. Samuel Lane (W)
▌At-large. Josiah Little (W)
▌At-large. John S. Williams (W)

==== Franklin ====
▌At-large. George T. Davies (W)

==== Hampden ====
▌At-large. Matthew Ives Jr. (D)
▌At-large. Asa Lincoln (D)

==== Hampshire ====
▌At-large. William Bowdoin (W)
▌At-large. Timothy A. Phelps (W)

==== Middlesex ====
▌At-large. Thomas J. Greenwood (D)
▌At-large. Joseph W. Mansur (D)
▌At-large. Leonard M. Parker (D)
▌At-large. James Russell (D)
▌At-large. Sidney Willard (W)

==== Norfolk ====
▌At-large. Lucas Pond (D)
▌At-large. Bradford L. Wales (D)
▌At-large. Benjamin P. Williams (D)

==== Plymouth ====
▌At-large. Seth Sprague Jr. (W)
▌At-large. Jared Whitman (W)

==== Suffolk ====
▌At-large. Edmund Dwight (D)
▌At-large. Isaac Harris (W)
▌At-large. William J. Hubbard (W)
▌At-large. George Morey (W)
▌At-large. Josiah Quincy Jr. (W)
▌At-large. James Savage (W)

==== Worcester ====
▌At-large. Benjamin Estabrook (D)
▌At-large. Charles C. P. Hastings (W)
▌At-large. Jedediah Marcy (D)
▌At-large. Charles Sibley (D)
▌At-large. Nathaniel Wood (D)
▌At-large. Samuel Wood (W)

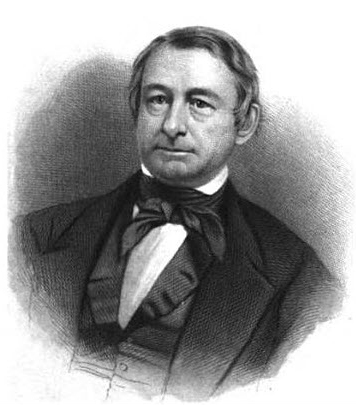
President of the Senate Daniel P. King (W)

=== House of Representatives ===
The members of the House of Representatives are apportioned by incorporated township and therefore the number of representatives in the House of Representatives can vary. Every incorporated township that has at least 150 ratable polls (taxable persons) is given one representative and for every additional 225 ratable polls, another representative is given. Townships can choose not to send a representative to the House each session, therefore the total number of filled seats can fluctuate year-to-year. Only the townships that sent representatives are listed below.

==== Barnstable ====
▌Barnstable. Daniel Basset (D)
▌Barnstable. Nathaniel Hinckley (D)
▌Barnstable. Thomas B. Lewis (D)
▌Brewster. Josiah Foster (W)
▌Chatham. Samuel Doane (D)
▌Chatham. Henry Gorham (D)
▌Dennis. Seth Crowell (W)
▌Dennis. Samuel Rogers (W)
▌Eastham. Barnabas Freeman (D)
▌Falmouth. Silas Jones (W)
▌Falmouth. Elijah Swift (W)
▌Harwich. Cyrus Weeks (W)
▌Harwich. Richard Baker Jr. (W)
▌Orleans. Luther Snow (W)
▌Orleans. Nathaniel Freeman (D)
▌Provincetown. John Atkins (W)
▌Provincetown. David Cook II (W)
▌Sandwich. Josiah Bacon (W)
▌Sandwich. Benjamin Bourne (W)
▌Sandwich. Charles Nye (W)
▌Truro. Freeman Atkins (W)
▌Truro. Jedediah Shed (D)
▌Wellfleet. Nathaniel P. Wiley (D)
▌Wellfleet. Solomon R. Hawes (D)
▌Yarmouth. Silvanus Crowell (W)
▌Yarmouth. Freeman Taylor (W)

==== Berkshire ====
▌Adams. Snell Babbit (W)
▌Adams. Lorenzo Rice (W)
▌Adams. Ezra D. Whitaker (W)
▌Alford. Elijah K. Williams (D)
▌Cheshire. Noah Y. Bushnell (D)
▌Dalton. John Chamberlain (D)
▌Egremont. Rich P. Brown (D)
▌Great Barrington. Perley D. Whitmore (W)
▌Great Barrington. Philip Barnes (W)
▌Hinsdale. William Hinsdale (W)
▌Lanesborough. Asahel Buck Jr. (D)
▌Lee. Eli Bradley (W)
▌Lee. Leonard Church (W)
▌Lenox. Henry H. Cook (D)
▌New Ashford. Phineas Harmon (W)
▌New Marlborough. George Smith (W)
▌Otis. Curtis Hunt (D)
▌Peru. Edward T. Nash (W)
▌Pittsfield. James Francis (W)
▌Pittsfield. Jabez Peck (W)
▌Pittsfield. Comfort B. Platt (W)
▌Richmond. Seneca Pettee (D)
▌Sandisfield. David Belden (D)
▌Savoy. Philip Pierce (D)
▌Sheffield. Orrin Curtis (D)
▌Sheffield. Moses Forbes (D)
▌Stockbridge. John M. Cooper (D)
▌Stockbridge. Charles Webster (D)
▌Tyringham. Amos Langdon Jr. (D)
▌Washington. John S. Noble (D)
▌Williamstown. James Corbin (D)
▌Williamstown. Henry Johnson (D)
▌Windsor. Moses Ford (D)

==== Dukes ====
▌Chilmark. Daniel Flanders (D)
▌Edgartown. David Davis (D)
▌Edgartown. Elihu P. Norton (D)
▌Tisbury. Bartlett Allen (D)
▌Tisbury. Asa Johnson (D)

==== Nantucket ====
▌Nantucket. George Bradburn (W)
▌Nantucket. Jonathan C. Briggs (W)
▌Nantucket. Benjamin Gardner (W)
▌Nantucket. Samuel H. Jenks (W)
▌Nantucket. William B. Mitchell (W)
▌Nantucket. David Joy (W)

==== Suffolk ====
▌Boston. Amos Binney (W)
▌Boston. George T. Bigelow (W)
▌Boston. John Boles (W)
▌Boston. Noah Brooks (W)
▌Boston. William C. Brown (D)
▌Boston. Francis Brown (W)
▌Boston. George T. Curtis (W)
▌Boston. George Darracott (W)
▌Boston. Isaac P. Davis (W)
▌Boston. Thomas A. Davis (W)
▌Boston. Daniel Denny (W)
▌Boston. Franklin Dexter (W)
▌Boston. Frederic Emerson (W)
▌Boston. David Francis (W)
▌Boston. John Gardner (W)
▌Boston. James W. Gates (W)
▌Boston. John C. Gray (W)
▌Boston. Samuel Greele (W)
▌Boston. John Green Jr. (W)
▌Boston. Ozias Goodwin (W)
▌Boston. Frederick Gould (W)
▌Boston. Nathan Gurney (W)
▌Boston. Samuel W. Hall (W)
▌Boston. James Harris (W)
▌Boston. Eliphalet P. Hartshorn (W)
▌Boston. John P. Healy (W)
▌Boston. Robert Hooper Jr. (W)
▌Boston. Cranston Howe (W)
▌Boston. Thomas Hunting (W)
▌Boston. Robert Keith (W)
▌Boston. William Lawrence (W)
▌Boston. Ezekiel W. Leach (W)
▌Boston. Benson Leavitt (W)
▌Boston. Joseph Lewis (W)
▌Boston. Theophilus R. Marvin (W)
▌Boston. Nahum Mitchell (W)
▌Boston. Francis J. Oliver (W)
▌Boston. William W. Parrott (W)
▌Boston. Theophilus Parsons (W)
▌Boston. Thomas Patten (W)
▌Boston. George W. Phillips (W)
▌Boston. Lewis G. Pray (W)
▌Boston. Samuel Quincy (W)
▌Boston. John Raynor (W)
▌Boston. Joseph W. Revere (W)
▌Boston. Jeffrey Richardson (W)
▌Boston. Daniel Safford (W)
▌Boston. J. Thomas Stevenson (W)
▌Boston. Woodbridge Strong (W)
▌Boston. Josiah Vinton Jr. (W)
▌Boston. Thomas B. Wales (W)
▌Boston. John B. Wells (W)
▌Boston. James M. Whiton (W)
▌Boston. William Willett (W)
▌Boston. Horatio M. Willis (W)
▌Boston. Robert C. Winthrop (W)

==== Worcester ====
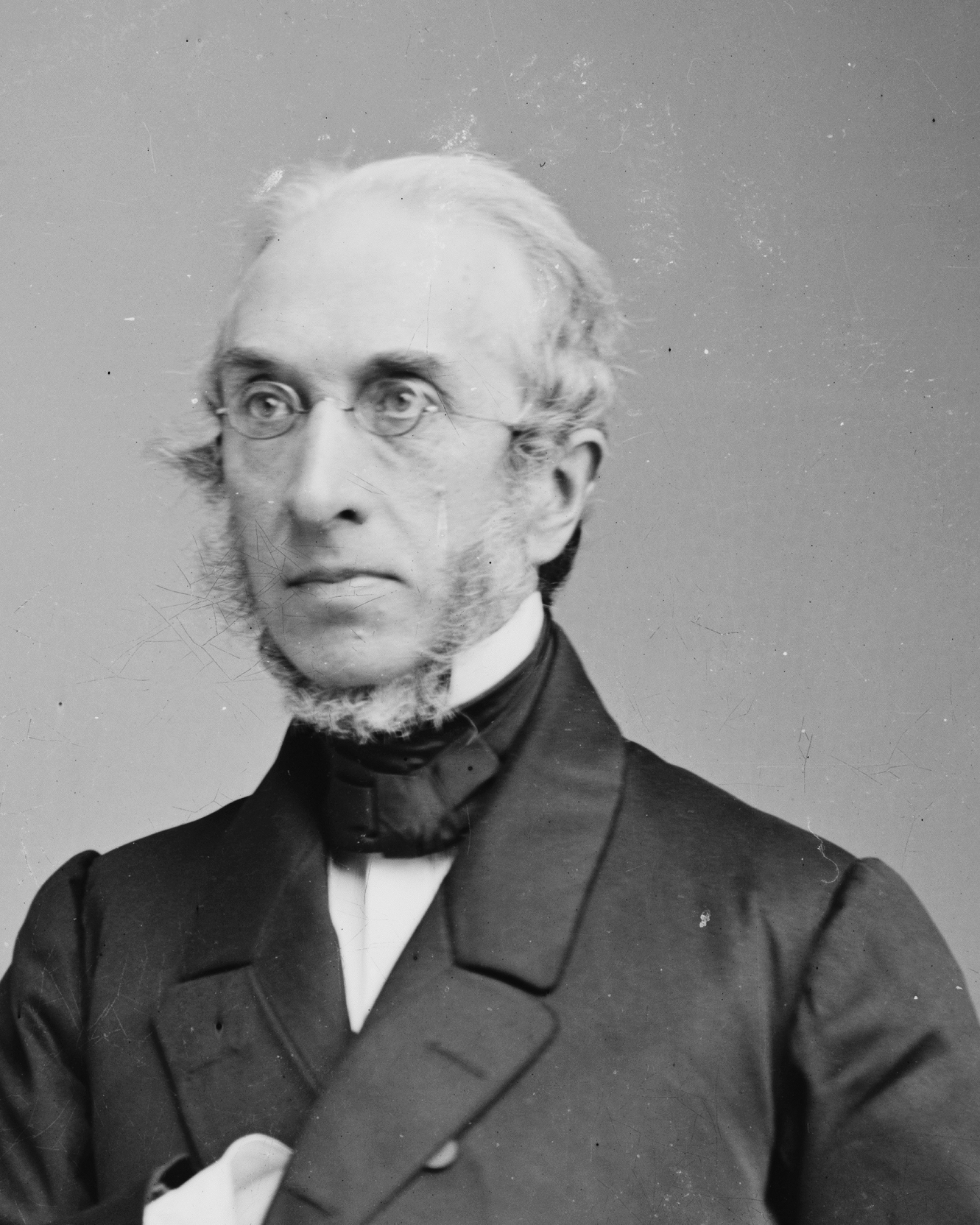
Speaker of the House Robert Charles Winthrop (W)

== Officers and officials ==
=== Congressional officers ===
- Sergeant-at-Arms to the Legislature: Benjamin Stevens
- Messenger to Governor and Council: William Manning
- Watchman to State-House: Edmund S. Brigham

=== Senate officers ===
- Chaplain: Rev. Daniel M. Lord
- Clerk: Charles Calhoun
- Assistant Clerk: W. P. Gregg
- Doorkeeper to Senate: Milton Hall

=== House of Representatives officers ===
- Chaplain: Rev. Joy H. Fairchild
- Chaplain: Rev. Benjamin Whittemore
- Clerk: Luther S. Cushing
- Doorkeeper to the House of Representatives: Elijah W. Cutting
- Doorkeeper to the House of Representatives: David Murphey
- Doorkeeper to the House of Representatives: Alexis Pool

== See also ==
- 26th United States Congress
- List of Massachusetts General Courts
