= Senator Leland =

Senator Leland may refer to:

- Burton Leland (1948–2018), Michigan State Senate
- Phineas W. Leland (1798–1870), Massachusetts State Senate
- Sherman Leland (1783–1853), Massachusetts State Senate
