= 1846 Massachusetts legislature =

American state legislature

67th Massachusetts General Court
←	66th	68th	→

Overview
- Legislative body: General Court

Senate
- Members: 40
- President: William B. Calhoun

House
- Members: 264
- Speaker: Samuel H. Walley, Jr.

Sessions
- 1st: January 7, 1846 – April 16, 1846

The 67th Massachusetts General Court, consisting of the Massachusetts Senate and the Massachusetts House of Representatives, met in 1846 during the governorship of George N. Briggs. William B. Calhoun served as president of the Senate and Samuel H. Walley, Jr. served as speaker of the House.

== Senators ==
- Alfred Allen
- Joseph Avery
- James F. Baldwin
- Thomas P. Beal
- Nathaniel B. Borden
- Thomas A. Bowen
- Barker Burnell
- William B. Calhoun
- Thomas G. Cary
- Dennis Condry
- Thos. D. Eliot
- Thomas Emerson
- Oliver Felt
- Zebina Field
- Barnabas Freeman
- Jason Goulding
- John C. Gray
- Saml. Guild
- E. Rockwood Hoar
- George Hodges
- Thomas Hopkinson
- Samuel A. Hurlbert
- Edmund Kimball, Jr.
- Forbes Kyle
- James Maguire
- Henry Poor
- Eli Rice
- Chauncey B. Rising
- Daniel Safford
- Stephen Salisbury
- Zeno Scudder
- Silas Shepard
- Joseph Stone
- John G. Thurston
- Francis O. Watts
- George Wheatland
- James P. Whitney
- Calvin Willard
- Joseph B. Woods
- Welcome Young

== See also ==
- 29th United States Congress
- List of Massachusetts General Courts
