= Senator Barney =

Senator Barney may refer to:

- John A. Barney (1840–1911), Wisconsin State Senate
- Obed Barney (fl. 1840s), Massachusetts State Senate

== See also ==
- Senator Varney (disambiguation)
