= 1841 Massachusetts legislature =

American state legislature

62nd Massachusetts General Court
←	61st	63rd	→

Overview
- Legislative body: General Court

Senate
- Members: 40
- President: Daniel P. King

House
- Members: 397
- Speaker: George Ashmun

Sessions
- 1st: January 6, 1841 – March 18, 1841

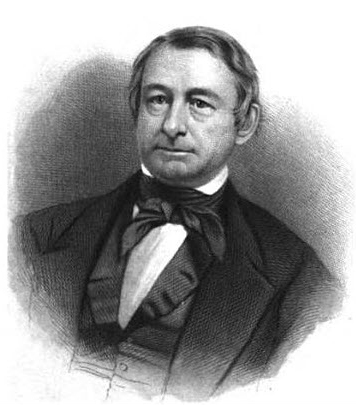
Daniel King, Senate president.

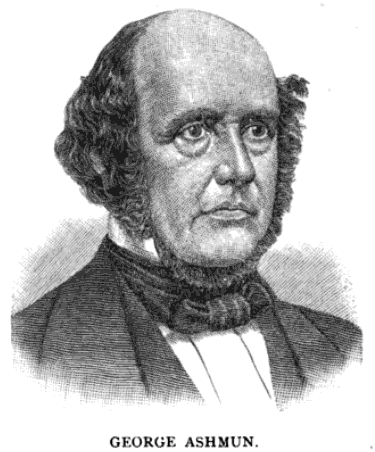
George Ashmun, House speaker.

Leaders of the Massachusetts General Court, 1841.

The 62nd Massachusetts General Court, consisting of the Massachusetts Senate and the Massachusetts House of Representatives, met in 1841 during the governorship of John Davis. Daniel P. King served as president of the Senate and George Ashmun served as speaker of the House.

== Senators ==
- Amos Abbott
- Chester Adams
- James Allen
- Seth Ames
- William G. Bates
- William Bowdoin
- Thomas Bradley
- William Child
- David Choate
- Seth Crowell
- George T. Davis
- Melatiah Everett
- Albert Fearing
- Charles C. P. Hastings
- Amory Holman
- Foster Hooper
- Phineas How
- Appleton Howe
- William J. Hubbard
- Daniel P. King
- Henry W. Kinsman
- Asa F. Lawrence
- Charles Marston
- Stephen Oliver
- Edmund Parker
- Theophilus Parsons
- Jesse Perkins
- Timothy A. Phelps
- William C. Plunkett
- Horatio Pratt
- Jeffrey Richardson
- James M. Robbins
- Seth Sprague, Jr.
- Benjamin Thompson
- Emory Washburn
- John B. Wells
- James White
- Seth Whitmarsh
- William Williams
- Samuel Wood

== Representatives ==
- Ezra W. Wilkinson

== See also ==
- 27th United States Congress
- List of Massachusetts General Courts
