= 1842 Massachusetts legislature =

American state legislature

63rd Massachusetts General Court
| ← | 62nd | 64th | → |

Overview
- Legislative body: General Court

Senate
- Members: 40
- President: Josiah Quincy Jr.

House
- Members: 336
- Speaker: Thomas H. Kinnicutt

Sessions
- 1st: January 5, 1842 – March 3, 1842 + extra session

The 63rd Massachusetts General Court, consisting of the Massachusetts Senate and the Massachusetts House of Representatives, met in 1842 during the governorship of John Davis. Josiah Quincy Jr. served as president of the Senate and Thomas H. Kinnicutt served as speaker of the House.

== Senators ==
- Amos Abbott
- Josiah G. Abbott
- James Allen
- Thomas Bradley
- Bowen Buckman
- Reuben Champion
- Robert Cross
- Seth Crowell
- Solomon Davis
- Alexander DeWitt
- Edward Dickenson
- Allen W. Dodge
- Melatiah Everett
- Francis B. Fay
- James Fuller
- Johnson Gardner
- Amory Holman
- Foster Hooper
- Appleton Howe
- William J. Hubbard
- Ephraim Merriam
- John Mills
- Jesse Perkins
- Sampson Perkins
- Thos. F. Plunkett
- Josiah Quincy, Jr.
- Jeffrey Richardson
- James M. Robbins
- Frederick Robinson
- Richard S. Rogers
- John Safford
- Seth Sprague, Jr.
- Increase Sumner
- John P. Tarbell
- Emory Washburn
- John B. Wells
- Noah Wells
- James White
- Samuel Williston
- Samuel Wood

== Representatives ==
- Charles Francis Adams
- Geo. T. Bigelow
- Luther Blodgett
- Friend H. Burt

== See also ==
- 27th United States Congress
- List of Massachusetts General Courts
