= Friend H. Burt =

American politician

Friend Humphrey Burt (January 8, 1808 – July 23, 1889) was an American tanner and politician.

== Life ==
Burt was born on January 8, 1808, in Tolland, Massachusetts, the son of Caleb Burt and Anna Merry. His brother was Orlo Burt, a member of the Massachusetts Legislature. He was named after Friend Humphrey of Albany, New York.

Burt apprenticed in the leather business in the New York "Swamp." In 1840, he built a tannery in New Boston. The tannery and its stock was destroyed in a fire in 1845, although he rebuilt the business. In 1848, he sold the business to a Mr. Hull. In 1849, he moved to Beach Pond, Pennsylvania with his brother Orlo and built a large tannery. Two years later, the brothers sold the business and bought another tannery near Lanesboro. They operated the tannery together for about three years, at which point Orlo sold the business and returned to Massachusetts. Burt then bought an extensive tannery in Lanesboro, which he later sold to William Tremain & Co. He then bought and enlarged a tannery from J. S. Corbett in Corbettsville, New York. The tannery was destroyed in a fire, together with his home and possessions, and he immediately rebuilt the tannery He moved to Corbettsville in 1854.

Burt served in the Massachusetts House of Representatives in 1842, representing Sandisfield. He was initially a Democrat, but the issue of slavery led him to join the Free Soil Party, and he was elected to the Massachusetts House of Representatives under the latter party. After he moved to New York, he helped establish the Republican Party there. In 1860, he was elected to the New York State Assembly as a Republican, representing Broome County. He served in the Assembly in 1861.

During the American Civil War, Burt bought a second tannery in Brookdale, Susquehanna County, Pennsylvania. He sold both of his tanneries in 1865, and a year later he moved to Mannington, West Virginia, with his son Frank and bought an oak leather tannery there. The tannery was burned in a fire two years later. A new tannery was built immediately, and it ran under the name F. H. Burt & Son for the next 21 years. In 1887, Burt's sons Caleb and William P. entered the practice and it was renamed F. H. Burt & Sons. The last firm continued operating until Burt's death in 1889.

Burt was a ruling elder of the Presbyterian Church in Corbettsville and Mannington for over 35 years. He was an active prohibitionist, and he helped organize the Prohibition Party in West Virginia. In 1840, he married Maria Hodges. Their children were Frank, Jane L., Albert C., Elizabeth, Caleb, Maria E., William P., Benjamin R., and Friend H., Jr. During the American Civil War, Frank joined the 89th New York Infantry Regiment and reached the rank of captain. Albert joined his brother's company, reached the rank of first lieutenant, and died fighting in 1864 while trying to capture a fortification between Seven Pines and Richmond.

Burt died at home on July 23, 1889. He was buried in Mannington Cemetery.

Massachusetts House of Representatives
Preceded by Silas Sage	Massachusetts House of Representatives; Sandisfield; 1842	Succeeded by Henry Abbey
New York State Assembly
Preceded by Henry Mather	New York State Assembly; Broome County; 1861	Succeeded by George Bartlett
