= List of United States senators in the 29th Congress =

This is a complete list of United States senators during the 29th United States Congress listed by seniority from March 4, 1845, to March 3, 1847.

Order of service is based on the commencement of the senator's first term. Behind this is former service as a senator (only giving the senator seniority within their new incoming class), service as vice president, a House member, a cabinet secretary, or a governor of a state. The final factor is the population of the senator's state.

Senators who were sworn in during the middle of the two-year congressional term (up until the last senator who was not sworn in early after winning the November 1846 election) are listed at the end of the list with no number.

== Terms of service ==
Class	Terms of service of senators that expired in years
Class 2	Terms of service of senators that expired in 1847 (AL, AR, DE, GA, IA, IL, KY, LA, MA, ME, MI, MN, MS, NC, NH, NJ, RI, SC, TN, TX, and VA.)
Class 3	Terms of service of senators that expired in 1849 (CT, DE, FL, IN, MA, MD, ME, MI, MN, MO, MS, NJ, NY, OH, PA, RI, TN, TX, and VT.)
Class 1	Terms of service of senators that expired in 1851 (AL, AR, CT, FL, GA, IA, IL, IN, KY, LA, MD, MO, NC, NH, NY, OH, PA, SC, VA, and VT.)

== U.S. Senate seniority list ==
U.S. Senate seniority
Rank	Senator (party-state)	Seniority date	Other factors
1	Thomas Hart Benton (D-MO)	August 10, 1821	
2	James Buchanan (D-PA)	December 6, 1834	
3	Robert John Walker (D-MS)	March 4, 1835	
4	Ambrose Hundley Sevier (D-AR)	September 18, 1836	
5	Thomas Clayton (W-DE)	January 9, 1837	
6	William Allen (D-OH)	March 4, 1837	
7	Samuel Shethar Phelps (W-VT)	March 4, 1839	
8	Daniel Sturgeon (D-PA)	January 14, 1840	
9	Jabez Williams Huntington (W-CT)	May 4, 1840	
10	Willie Person Mangum (W-NC)	November 25, 1840	
11	Isaac Chapman Bates (W-MA)	January 13, 1841	
12	Levi Woodbury (D-NH)	March 4, 1841	Former senator (5 years)
13	John Macpherson Berrien (W-GA)	March 4, 1841	Former senator (4 years)
14	William Segar Archer (W-VA)	March 4, 1841	Former representative (15 years)
15	George Evans (W-ME)	March 4, 1841	Former representative (11 years)
16	William Woodbridge (W-MI)	March 4, 1841	Former delegate (1 year)
17	James Turner Morehead (W-KY)	March 4, 1841	Former governor
18	Jacob Welsh Miller (W-NJ)	March 4, 1841	New Jersey 14th in population (1830)
19	Alexander Barrow (W-LA)	March 4, 1841	Louisiana 19th in population (1830)
20	James F. Simmons (W-RI)	March 4, 1841	Rhode Island 23rd in population (1830)
21	Arthur Pendleton Bagby (D-AL)	November 24, 1841	
22	John Jordan Crittenden (W-KY)	March 31, 1842	
23	William Lewis Dayton (W-NJ)	July 2, 1842	
24	George McDuffie (D-SC)	December 23, 1842	
25	James Alfred Pearce (W-MD)	March 4, 1843	Former representative (6 years); Maryland 15th in population (1840)
26	Charles Gordon Atherton (D-NH)	March 4, 1843	Former representative (6 years); New Hampshire 22nd in population (1840)
27	Edward Allen Hannegan (D-IN)	March 4, 1843	Former representative (4 years)
28	Walter Terry Colquitt (D-GA)	March 4, 1843	Former representative (1 year)
29	William Henry Haywood, Jr. (D-NC)	March 4, 1843	North Carolina 7th in population (1840)
30	Sidney Breese (D-IL)	March 4, 1843	Illinois 14th in population (1840)
31	William Upham (W-VT)	March 4, 1843	Vermont 21st in population (1840)
32	David Rice Atchison (D-MO)	October 14, 1843	
33	Spencer Jarnagin (W-TN)	October 17, 1843	
34	John Fairfield (W-ME)	December 4, 1843	Maine 13th in population (1840)
35	James Semple (D-IL)	December 4, 1843	Illinois 14th in population (1840)
36	Henry Johnson (W-LA)	February 12, 1844	
37	Dixon Hall Lewis (D-AL)	April 22, 1844	
38	John Milton Niles (D-CT)	May 16, 1844	
39	Chester Ashley (D-AR)	November 8, 1844	
40	Daniel Stevens Dickinson (D-NY)	November 30, 1844	
41	John Adams Dix (D-NY)	January 27, 1845	
42	Daniel Webster (W-MA)	March 4, 1845	Former senator (13 years)
43	John Middleton Clayton (W-DE)	March 4, 1845	Former senator (7 years)
44	Thomas Corwin (W-OH)	March 4, 1845	Former representative (9 years)
45	Jesse Speight (D-MS)	March 4, 1845	Former representative (8 years)
46	Hopkins Lacy Turney (D-TN)	March 4, 1845	Former representative (6 years)
47	Lewis Cass (D-MI)	March 4, 1845	Former cabinet member
48	Jesse D. Bright (D-IN)	March 4, 1845	Indiana 10th in population (1840)
49	Reverdy Johnson (W-MD)	March 4, 1845	Maryland 15th in population (1840)
50	Albert Collins Greene (W-RI)	March 4, 1845	Rhode Island 24th in population (1840)
	Simon Cameron (D-PA)	March 13, 1845	
	John Davis (W-MA)	March 24, 1845	
51	David Levy Yulee (D-FL)	July 1, 1845	Former delegate
52	James Diament Westcott, Jr. (D-FL)	July 1, 1845	
	Joseph Williams Chalmers (D-MS)	November 3, 1845	
53	John Caldwell Calhoun (D-SC)	November 26, 1845	
	Benning Wentworth Jenness (D-NH)	December 1, 1845	
54	Isaac Samuels Pennybacker (D-VA)	December 3, 1845	
55	Thomas Jefferson Rusk (D-TX)	February 21, 1846	
56	Samuel Houston (D-TX)	February 26, 1846	
	Joseph Cilley (L-NH)	June 13, 1846	
	George Edmund Badger (W-NC)	November 25, 1846	
	Andrew Pickens Butler (D-SC)	December 4, 1846	
	James M. Mason (D-VA)	January 21, 1847	Former representative
	Pierre Soulé (D-LA)	January 21, 1847	

== See also ==
- 29th United States Congress
- List of United States representatives in the 29th Congress
