= 1851 United States Senate election in Massachusetts =

- January 14–April 24, 1851

40 members of the Massachusetts Senate 396 members of the Massachusetts House Majority vote of each house needed to win
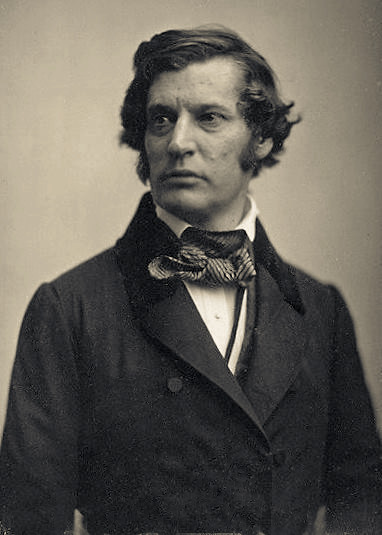

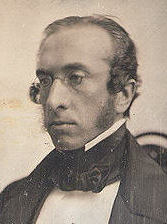
Nominee	Charles Sumner	Robert C. Winthrop
Party	Free Soil	Whig
Senate	23	14
Percentage	60.53%	36.84%
House	193	166
Percentage	50.26%	43.23%
Senator before election
Robert C. Winthrop
Whig
Elected Senator
Charles Sumner
Free Soil

The 1851 United States Senate election in Massachusetts was held during January 1851. Free Soil Party candidate Charles Sumner was elected by a coalition of Free-Soil and Democratic legislators over Whig incumbent Robert C. Winthrop, who had been appointed to finish the term of retiring Senator Daniel Webster.

At the time, Massachusetts elected United States senators by a majority vote of each separate house of the Massachusetts General Court, the House and the Senate.

== Background ==
=== Democratic-Free Soil coalition ===
At the time, Massachusetts elected governors by a majority of the popular vote. If no candidate received a majority, the election was decided by a vote of the General Court. In 1850, the Massachusetts electorate split between three major parties: the Whigs, the Democrats, and the anti-slavery Free Soil Party. To overcome the much larger Whig Party, the Democrats and Free-Soilers entered a coalition. Under their power-sharing agreement, the state Democratic Party adopted an anti-slavery platform. Democrats George S. Boutwell and Nathaniel Prentiss Banks would be elected Governor and Speaker of the House, respectively. Free Soil leader Henry Wilson was elected Senate President.

Finally, abolitionist activist Charles Sumner would be elected to the United States Senate in the January election.

=== Legislative composition ===
In the Senate, 14 Whigs, 14 Democrats, and 12 Free-Soilers were elected. In the House, 175 Whigs, 108 Democrats, and 113 Free-Soilers were elected. Although the Democratic-Free Soil coalition held a clear majority in each house, some Democratic legislators voiced their opposition to the election of the radical abolitionist Sumner. Conservative representatives who sought reconciliation with the South feared that Sumner's election would be a step toward civil war and sought to deny him the majority in the House.

== Election ==
=== January ===
The election for Senator began in the House on January 14, but the House adjourned after no candidate received a majority on the first two ballots. Following the first ballot, a motion was made to postpone the election until February 15. Pending that motion, another motion was made to adjourn. The motion to adjourn failed 180-190, and the motion to postpone failed 159-193. The House proceeded to a second ballot. Following the failure of the second ballot, the House adjourned for the day. They also adjourned on January 15 without electing a Senator. Following this second adjournment, the House Free Soilers threatened that if Sumner was not elected on the next ballot, then they would request the resignation of Democratic Governor George S. Boutwell, who owed his seat to the coalition's support.

On January 20, between the fifth and sixth House ballots, Sumner was victorious over Winthrop in the Senate, receiving three votes more than the necessary 20.

Results of the January 20 Senate ballot
For Sumner	For Winthrop	Bishop
George Austin ▌Joseph T. Buckingham; Edward Cazneau; Lyman W. Dean; Alexander DeWitt; John W. Graves ▌▌Whiting Griswold; Francis Howe; Edmund Kimball; Edw. L. Keyes; Alvah Morrison; David Moseley; Frederic Robinson; Daniel Saunders Jr. Tabor; J. M. Usher; Asa G. Welch; Giles H. Whitney; Samuel Warner Jr. Luke Wellington; Moses Wood; William H. Wood ▌Henry Wilson	▌William Barney ▌Z. D. Bassett ▌John Boynton ▌Robert S. Daniels ▌William Hyde ▌Charles Hubbard ▌William A. Hawley ▌Stephen Hilliard ▌George H. Kuhn ▌Moses Newell ▌Charles T. Russell ▌David Sears ▌Benjamin Seaver ▌John H. Wilkins	▌Erasmus D. Beach

=== April ===
On the twentieth ballot, April 23, Sumner was found to be one vote shy of a majority. However, a single vote had Sumner's name written but crossed out in pencil. After debate, this vote was counted and it was reported that Sumner had a one-vote majority, but a Whig member of the House moved to count a previously-discarded vote as "scattering." After another half hour of debate, the motion carried without opposition and Sumner's majority was erased. It was reported that there were two more votes than members voting.

After it was erroneously reported that Sumner had won by one vote, abolitionists throughout the Commonwealth began celebrating.

On the twenty-third ballot, Sumner fell two votes short of a majority. It was reported that two votes for Sumner found "doubled together" were thrown out.

On the twenty-sixth ballot, it was moved that votes be cast by envelope. Two Whigs were reported to have supported Sumner, one being Nathaniel B. Borden after instructions to do so from his constituents. Sumner was declared the victor with a majority of one. Two blank ballots were not counted.

== Results ==
Balloting by Round
Ballots	1	2	3	4	5	S	6	7	8	9	10	11	12	13	14	15	16	17	18	19	20	21	22	23	24	25	26
▌ Sumner	186	186			185	23	187	188														194	193	191			193
▌ Winthrop	167	168			169	16	169	168														167	166	166			166
▌ Childs	6																										1
▌ Merrick	5																										0
▌ Davis	5																										3
▌ Rantoul	4	8																									0
▌ Boutwell	2																										0
▌ Phillips	2																										4
▌ Hallett	1																										0
▌ Briggs	1																										0
▌ Hoar	1																										0
▌ John Mills	1																										0
▌ Henry Bishop	0					1																					11
▌ Cushing	0																										3
▌ Banks	0																										1
Scattering	0	17			25	28	26															27	27	27			0
Blank	0	4			3	3	1																				0
Total	381	383			382	382	382																				384
