= 1851–52 Massachusetts gubernatorial election =

- November 10, 1851 (popular); January 12, 1852 (legislative)
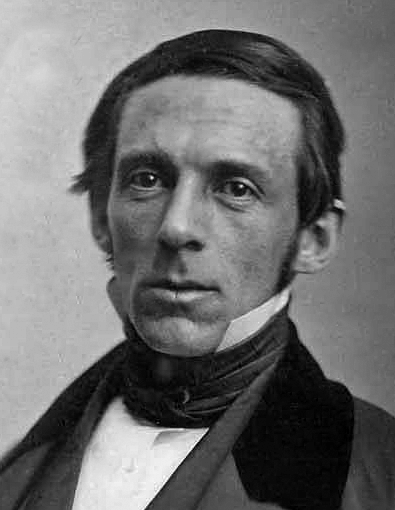

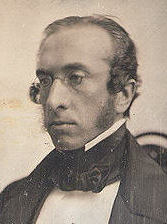

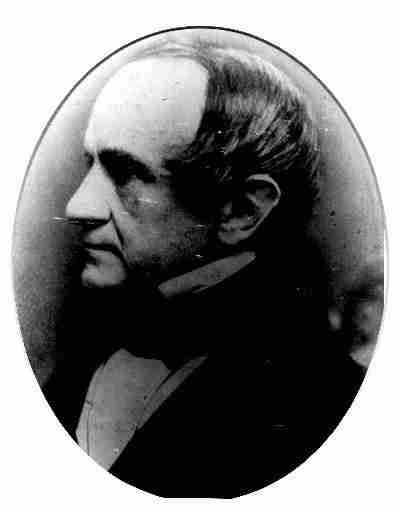
| Nominee | George S. Boutwell | Robert C. Winthrop | John G. Palfrey |
| Party | Democratic | Whig | Free Soil |
| Electoral vote | 28 | 11 | Did not qualify |
| Popular vote | 43,732 | 64,279 | 28,560 |
| Percentage | 31.93% | 46.93% | 20.85% |
- Popular election results by county Winthrop: 30–40% 40–50% 50–60%
Governor before election
George S. Boutwell
Democratic
Elected Governor
George S. Boutwell
Democratic

The 1851–52 Massachusetts gubernatorial election consisted of an initial popular vote held on November 10, 1851, followed by a legislative vote conducted on January 12, 1852. Incumbent Democrat Governor George S. Boutwell was reelected to a second term in office. The ultimate task of electing the governor had been placed before the Massachusetts General Court because no candidate received the majority of the vote required for a candidate to be elected through the popular election.

Although Whig nominee Robert C. Winthrop had won a plurality of the popular vote, he did not win the election because he failed to win the outright majority required to be elected through the popular vote and ultimately placed second in the resulting legislative vote after a coalition of Free Soil and Democratic Party legislators partnered to elect Boutwell to a second term.

== Background ==
After winning the 1850 elections, the Democratic-Free Soil coalition elected Charles Sumner to the U.S. Senate despite drawn-out resistance from conservative Democrats. In addition to substantive banking and corporate reform, the legislature introduced a secret ballot law. Prior to 1888, ballots were printed and circulated by the campaigns and featured only the sponsoring party's candidates for office; in this way, it was possible for poll watchers to determine how a citizen had voted by observing which party's ticket they handed to the election officials. The 1851 law required that ballots be sealed in an envelope prior to being cast, ensuring the secrecy of the citizen's vote. This innovation was a major blow to the Whigs, who relied on the open ballot to pressure factory employees to vote the party line. However, the more conservative faction of the Free Soilers blocked a legislative reapportionment plan which would have increased representation for coalition's base of small towns and a plan to move the capital from Whig-dominated Boston to Worcester.

== General election ==
=== Candidates ===
- George S. Boutwell, incumbent governor (Democratic)
- Francis Cogswell (Independent)
- John G. Palfrey, former U.S. representative from Cambridge (Free Soil)
- Robert C. Winthrop, former U.S. senator and speaker of the U.S. House (Whig)

=== Campaign ===
With the state still split in a three-way plurality and following the clear emergence of the Democratic-Free Soil coalition of 1850, both the Whig and Coalition forces focused on securing a majority in the General Court.

The primary policy issue in the campaign was the coalition effort for a ten-hour workday. Whigs opposed the measure on as a threat to both economic efficiency and social mobility, arguing that labor regulation prevented motivated employees from contracting for more hours, accumulating capital, and reinvesting for themselves. Though some suggested emphasizing national issues instead to divide the coalition forces, the Whigs settled on a campaign led by Senator John W. Davis on state issues.

The ten-hour debate came to a head in Lowell, a city more dependent on factory labor than any other. Despite the city's traditional domination by textile industrialists and the Whig Party, the coalition ticket headed by attorney Benjamin Butler campaigned explicitly in favor of the ten-hour day. With the secret ballot allowing workers to cast votes without their employer's knowledge, the ticket won a surprising upset in the usually-Whig city on election day. However, the Whig city government found irregularities in the returns and declared a new election. With the legislature split evenly between the coalition and Whig forces, the Lowell election would decide control of state government.

As the Lowell run-off election intensified, Whig industrialists like Linus Child returned to old tactics, including threatening any employee who voted the Butler ticket with termination. At a rally in response, Butler told the crowd, "I am here to serve you and to save you from bondage" and openly threatened to light the city on fire if a single vote were bribed or coerced:

As God lives and I live, by the living Jehovah! if one man is driven from his employment by these men because of his vote, I will lead you to make Lowell what it was twenty-five years ago,—a sheep pasture and a fishing place; and I will commence by applying the torch to my own house. Let them come on. As we are not the aggressors, we seek not this awful contest.

The Butler ticket won the late election, securing a General Court majority for the coalition and raising Senator-elect Butler's statewide profile.

== Results ==
=== Popular election ===
1851 Massachusetts gubernatorial election
| Party | Candidate | Votes | % | ±% |
|---|---|---|---|---|
| Whig | Robert C. Winthrop | 64,279 | 46.93 | ▲0.15 |
| Democratic | George S. Boutwell (incumbent) | 43,732 | 31.93 | ▲2.25 |
| Free Soil | John G. Palfrey | 28,560 | 20.85 | ▼1.92 |
| Independent | Francis Cogswell | 118 | 0.09 | ▼0.48 |
| Write-in | | 280 | 0.20 | Steady |
| Total votes | | 136,969 | 100.00 | |
| Democratic hold | | Swing | | |

=== Legislative vote ===
The Massachusetts House of Representatives certified the popular returns on January 12, 1851. The following day, as a result of the failure for a candidate to secure the needed majority to be elected through the popular vote, the election of the Governor was placed before the two chambers of the state legislature: the Massachusetts General Court. The four candidates that received voted in the popular election all qualified as candidates from which the General Court could choose. The process for the legislature to elect a governor saw the Massachusetts House of Representatives first hold votes to select two candidates from which the Massachusetts State Senate would then select a winner. The General Court held its votes to elect the governor on January 13, 1851.

==== House vote ====
Massachusetts House of Representatives vote to select the first candidate to be placed before the Massachusetts State Senate
| Party | Candidate | Votes | % |
|---|---|---|---|
| Democratic | George S. Boutwell (incumbent) | 200 | 50.76 |
| Whig | Robert C. Winthrop | 194 | 49.24 |
| Free Soil | John G. Palfrey | 0 | 0.00 |
| Independent | Francis Cogswell | 0 | 0.00 |
| Total votes | | 394 | 100.00 |

Massachusetts House of Representatives vote to select the second candidate to be placed before the Massachusetts State Senate
| Party | Candidate | Votes | % |
|---|---|---|---|
| Whig | Robert C. Winthrop | 240 | 83.92 |
| Free Soil | John G. Palfrey | 30 | 10.49 |
| Independent | Francis Cogswell | 10 | 3.50 |
| Total votes | | 286 | 100.00 |
| Blank votes | no candidate | 12 | N/A |

==== Senate vote ====
Massachusetts State Senate Senate vote for governor
| Party | Candidate | Votes | % |
|---|---|---|---|
| Democratic | George S. Boutwell (incumbent) | 28 | 71.79 |
| Whig | Robert C. Winthrop | 11 | 28.21 |
| Total votes | | 39 | 100.00 |

== Aftermath ==
In response to Child's threat in the Lowell election, the new legislature passed a law making it a crime to bribe or coerce voters.

== See also ==
- 1851 Massachusetts legislature
