= 1841 Massachusetts gubernatorial election =

- November 8, 1841
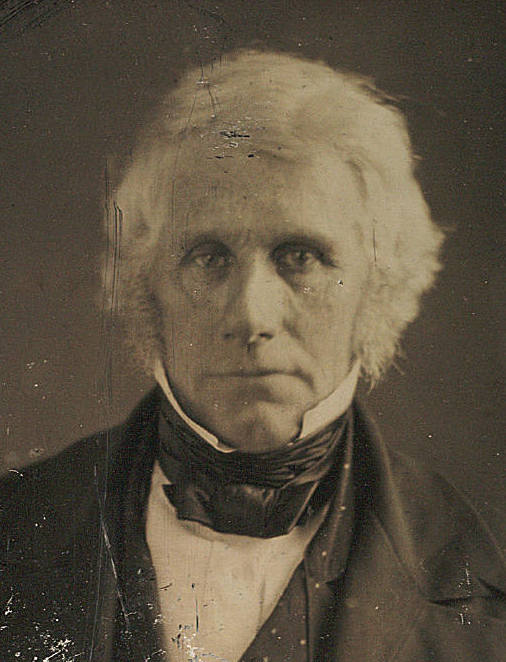

Nominee	John Davis	Marcus Morton
Party	Whig	Democratic
Popular vote	55,974	51,367
Percentage	50.40%	46.25%
- County results Davis: 40–50% 50–60% 60–70% Morton: 50–60%
Governor before election
John Davis
Whig
Elected Governor
John Davis
Whig

The 1841 Massachusetts gubernatorial election was held on November 8.

Incumbent Whig Governor John Davis was re-elected to a second consecutive term in office over Democrat Marcus Morton.

== General election ==
=== Candidates ===
- Lucius Boltwood (Liberty)
- John Davis, former governor and U.S. senator (Whig)
- Marcus Morton, former governor (Democratic)

=== Results ===
1841 Massachusetts gubernatorial election
Party	Candidate	Votes	%	±%
Whig	John Davis (incumbent)	55,974	50.40%	▼5.28
Democratic	Marcus Morton	51,367	46.25%	▲2.92
Liberty	Lucius Boltwood	3,488	3.14%	▲2.29
Write-in		233	0.21%	▲0.07
Total votes		111,062	100.00%	

== See also ==
- 1841 Massachusetts legislature
