= Senator Varney =

Senator Varney may refer to:

- Edmund Varney (1778–1847), New York State Senate
- George D. Varney Sr. (1903–1982), Maine State Senate

== See also ==
- Senator Barney (disambiguation)
