= James H. Duncan =

American politician (1793–1869)

James Henry Duncan
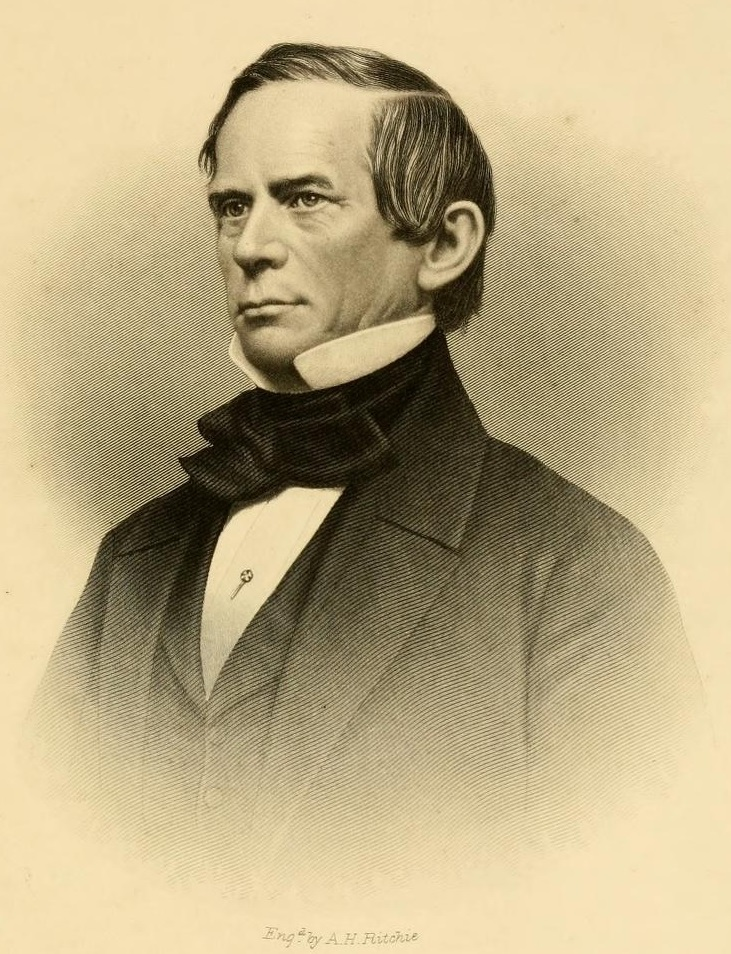

Member of the U.S. House of Representatives from Massachusetts's 3rd district
- In office March 4, 1849 – March 3, 1853
- Preceded by: Amos Abbott
- Succeeded by: J. Wiley Edmands

Member of the Massachusetts House of Representatives
- In office 1827; 1837–1838; 1857

Personal details
- Born: December 5, 1793 Haverhill, Massachusetts
- Died: February 8, 1869 (aged 75) Haverhill, Massachusetts
- Party: Whig

Coat of Arms of James Duncan

James Henry Duncan (December 5, 1793 – February 8, 1869) was a member of the United States House of Representatives from Massachusetts.

Born in Haverhill, Massachusetts, to James Duncan and his wife, Rebecca White, Duncan attended Phillips Exeter Academy, and graduated from Harvard University in 1812. He studied law and was admitted to the bar in 1815, commencing practice in Haverhill.

He was an active militia officer, and attained the rank of colonel. He was president of the Essex Agricultural Society, and member of the Massachusetts House of Representatives in 1827, 1837, 1838, and again in 1857. He served in the Massachusetts State Senate from 1828 to 1831, and was a delegate to the Whig National Convention at Harrisburg, Pennsylvania, in 1839. He was appointed Commissioner-in-Bankruptcy in 1841.

He was elected as a Whig to the Thirty-first and Thirty-second Congresses (March 4, 1849 – March 3, 1853). Following his political career he was engaged in the real-estate business.

He died of pneumonia on February 8, 1869, in Haverhill, aged 75, and was interred in Linwood Cemetery.

His daughter, Margaret, married Stephen Henry Phillips on October 3, 1871.

James H. Duncan is the namesake of Duncan, Illinois.

== Personal life ==
James married Mary Willis on June 26, 1826, in Haverhill, Massachusetts.

They had 13 children together, 8 daughters and 5 sons: Rebekah White (died in infancy), James Henry, Benjamin Willis (died in infancy), Rebekah White, Mary Willis, George (died in childhood), Susan Reynolds, Samuel White, Rosanna, Elizabeth, George Willis, Caroline and Margaret.

U.S. House of Representatives
Preceded by Amos Abbott	Member of the U.S. House of Representatives from Massachusetts's 3rd congressional district March 4, 1849 – March 3, 1853	Succeeded by J. Wiley Edmands
