= Prentiss Mellen =

American judge

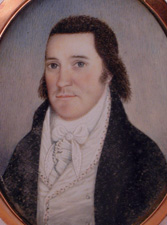

United States Senator from Massachusetts
- In office June 5, 1818 – May 15, 1820
- Preceded by: Eli P. Ashmun
- Succeeded by: Elijah H. Mills

First Chief Justice of the Maine Supreme Judicial Court
- In office July 1, 1820–October 11, 1834
- Preceded by: None
- Succeeded by: Nathan Weston

Personal details
- Born: October 11, 1764 Sterling, Massachusetts
- Died: December 31, 1840 (aged 76) Portland, Maine
- Party: Federalist
- Spouse: Sarah Hudson
- Children: Grenville Mellen; Frederic Mellen
- Education: Harvard University
- Profession: Attorney

Prentiss Mellen (October 11, 1764 – December 31, 1840) was a lawyer, politician, and jurist from Massachusetts and Maine. Born in Massachusetts and educated at Harvard, Mellen served for two years as a United States senator from Massachusetts, and was appointed Maine's first chief justice after it achieved statehood in 1820.

== Early years ==
Prentiss Mellen was the eighth of nine children of Rev. John Mellen and Rebecca (Prentiss) Mellen, born in 1764 in the second parish of Lancaster, Massachusetts, now Sterling. Mellen's father was the local minister, and his mother the daughter of the first parish minister. He graduated from Harvard College in 1784. He moved to Barnstable, where he worked as a tutor for the family of James Otis Jr., and studied law with Shearjashub Bourne. He was admitted to the bar in 1788, and established a practice in Sterling. This was unsuccessful, and he next opened a practice in Bridgewater. There he met Sally Hudson of Hartford, Connecticut, whom he married in 1795. The couple had six children, four of whom survived him.

Still not meeting with financial success, he briefly joined his brother's law practice in Dover, New Hampshire before finally settling in Biddeford in the Massachusetts District of Maine. Around 1806, he moved to Portland, where Mellen Street is now named for him.

== Senate and Chief Justice ==
Mellen served on the Massachusetts Governor's Council 1808–1809, 1817, and as a presidential elector in 1817. He was a trustee of Bowdoin College in Brunswick, Maine from 1817 to 1836. He was elected to the United States Senate, representing Massachusetts, to fill the vacancy caused by the resignation of Eli P. Ashmun, and served from June 5, 1818, to May 15, 1820, when he resigned. Maine had won admission to the Union as a separate state in 1820, and he was appointed the first chief justice of the Maine Supreme Judicial Court. He served until his resignation in 1834, when age disqualified him. His last major act of public serve was as chairman of a commission to revise and codify the public statutes of Maine, work which was completed in 1840.

In 1833, Mellen was the first President of a newly formed abolitionist society formed in Portland. Samuel Fessenden and Methodist Rev. Gershom A. Cox were the vice-presidents.

Mellen died in Portland on December 31, 1840, and was buried in its Western Cemetery.

== Notes ==
U.S. Senate
Preceded by Eli P. Ashmun	U.S. senator (Class 1) from Massachusetts; 1818–1820; Served alongside: Harrison Gray Otis	Succeeded by Elijah H. Mills
Legal offices
New title	Chief Justice of the Maine Supreme Judicial Court; July 1, 1820 – October 11, 1834	Succeeded by Nathan Weston
