= Duncan, Illinois =

- Unincorporated community
- Location within Illinois Location within the United States
- Coordinates: 40°59′01″N 89°47′21″W
- Country: United States
- State: Illinois
- County: Stark
- Elevation: 659 ft (201 m)
- Time zone: UTC-6 (Central (CST))
  - Summer (DST): UTC-5 (CDT)
- Area code: 309
- GNIS feature ID: 407481

Duncan is an unincorporated community in Stark County, Illinois, United States, located 4 miles (6.4 km) north-northwest of Princeville.

== History ==
Duncan was laid out ca. 1870. The community is named for James H. Duncan, a United States Congressman from Massachusetts from 1849 to 1853.
