= Frederick Robinson (Massachusetts politician) =

American politician (1799–1882)

Sheriff of Essex County, Massachusetts
- In office 1852–1854
- Preceded by: Joseph E. Sprague
- Succeeded by: Thomas E. Payson

President of the Massachusetts Senate
- In office 1843–1843
- Preceded by: Phineas W. Leland
- Succeeded by: Josiah Quincy Jr.

Member of the Massachusetts Senate
- In office 1843–1843
- Preceded by: Phineas W. Leland
- Succeeded by: Levi Lincoln Jr.

Personal details
- Born: August 7, 1799 Exeter, New Hampshire
- Died: January 22, 1882 (aged 82) Marblehead, Massachusetts
- Party: Democratic
- Spouse: Mary Hutton
- Occupation: Shoemaker; Lawyer; Sheriff; Politician

Frederick Robinson (August 7, 1799 – January 22, 1882) served as sheriff of Essex County, Massachusetts, and as the President of the Massachusetts Senate.

== Family life ==
Robinson married Mary Hutton.

== Business career ==
Early on in life Robinson was engaged in the trade of shoe making, he later became a self taught lawyer.

== Political career ==
Robinson served as the Sheriff Essex County, Massachusetts, in the Massachusetts House of Representatives, and he was a member, and the president of, the Massachusetts Senate.

=== Legislative accomplishments ===
While a member of the Massachusetts House of Representatives Robinson wrote and introduced the bill, An Act to Abolish Imprisonment for Debt that was enacted, and came into effect on July 4, 1834. Robinson was also instrumental in passing legislation that ended special pleadings in Massachusetts' Courts of Justice.

=== Campaign for Governor ===
In 1847 Robinson was an unsuccessful Democratic party candidate for the US House of Representatives.

== Other government service ==
Robinson was the Warden of the Massachusetts State Prison.

== See also ==
- 64th Massachusetts General Court (1843)

== Notes ==
Political offices
Preceded by Phineas W. Leland	President of the Massachusetts Senate; 1843	Succeeded by Josiah Quincy Jr.
Preceded by Joseph E. Sprague	Sheriff of Essex County, Massachusetts; 1852–1854	Succeeded by Thomas E. Payson
