= Phineas W. Leland =

American politician

Phineas Washington Leland
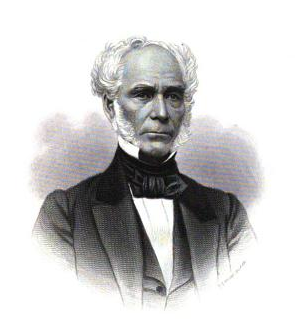

President of the Massachusetts Senate
- In office 1843–1843
- Preceded by: Josiah Quincy Jr.
- Succeeded by: Frederick Robinson

Member of the Massachusetts Senate
- In office 1843–1843
- Preceded by: Josiah Quincy Jr.
- Succeeded by: Levi Lincoln Jr.

Collector of Customs for Fall River, Massachusetts
- In office 1834–1860
- Appointed by: Andrew Jackson

Personal details
- Born: October 4, 1798 Grafton, Massachusetts
- Died: January 22, 1870
- Party: Democratic
- Spouse: Parmelia T. Wood
- Education: Bowdoin College, M.D., 1826
- Occupation: Physician, US Collector of Customs, journalist

Phineas Washington Leland (October 4, 1798 – January 22, 1870) was a Massachusetts medical doctor and journalist, and the Collector of Customs for Fall River, Massachusetts, who also served as a member, and as the President of the Massachusetts Senate.

== Early life ==
Leland was born on October 4, 1798, in Grafton, Massachusetts, to David Warren and Mary (Rawson) Leland.

== Family life ==
In 1826 Leland married Pamelia W. Wood of Mendon, Massachusetts, they had five children.

== Journalist ==
In 1836 Leland was the first editor of The Fall River Patriot, and he was also the first editor of the Fall River Weekly News. While he was a member of the Massachusetts Senate Leland wrote for The Boston Post.

== Death ==
Leland died on January 22, 1870.

== See also ==
- 64th Massachusetts General Court (1843)

== Notes ==
Political offices
Preceded by Josiah Quincy Jr.	President of the Massachusetts Senate; 1842	Succeeded by Frederick Robinson
