= 1843 Massachusetts legislature =

American state legislature

64th Massachusetts General Court
←	63rd	65th	→

Overview
- Legislative body: General Court

Senate
- Members: 40
- President: Phineas W. Leland, Frederick Robinson

House
- Members: 352
- Speaker: Daniel P. King

Sessions
- 1st: January 4, 1843 – March 24, 1843

The 64th Massachusetts General Court, consisting of the Massachusetts Senate and the Massachusetts House of Representatives, met in 1843 during the governorship of Marcus Morton. Phineas W. Leland and Frederick Robinson served as presidents of the Senate and Daniel P. King served as speaker of the House.

== Senators ==
- Josiah G. Abbott
- Ariel Bragg
- Artemas Brown
- Benjamin F. Brown
- Reuben Champion
- Ira Curtis
- Isaac Davis
- Solomon Davis
- Edward Dickinson
- John B. Dillingham
- Samuel A. Eliot
- Benjamin Estabrook
- James Fuller
- Johnson Gardner
- Samuel Giles
- Francis R. Gourgas
- Francis C. Gray
- Thomas J. Greenwood
- Joseph Griswold
- Nathaniel Hammond
- Jonathan Hartwell
- George Hood
- Appleton Howe
- Stephen Ilsley
- Phineas W. Leland
- Asa Lincoln
- Edward P. Little
- Sampson Perkins
- Asa Pingree
- Thomas F. Plunkett
- Josiah Quincy Jr.
- Jeffrey Richardson
- Frederick Robinson
- George Savory
- John Spurr
- George B. Upton
- Eliab Ward
- Samuel Williston
- Nathaniel Wood
- Isaac H. Wright

== Representatives ==
- General list by county
- Ariel Bragg
- C. F. Adams
- Geo. T. Bigelow
- James Blake

== See also ==
- 28th United States Congress
- List of Massachusetts General Courts
