= Eli P. Ashmun =

U.S. Senator

Eli Porter Ashmun

United States Senator from Massachusetts
- In office June 12, 1816 – May 10, 1818
- Preceded by: Christopher Gore
- Succeeded by: Prentiss Mellen

Member of the Massachusetts Senate
- In office 1808–1810

Personal details
- Born: June 24, 1770 area of Fort Edward, New York, US
- Died: May 10, 1819 (aged 48) Northampton, Massachusetts, US
- Resting place: Bridge Street Cemetery, Northampton, Massachusetts, US
- Party: Federalist
- Spouse: Lucy Hooker
- Children: George Ashmun, Lewis Ashmun, John Hooker Ashmun b. July 3, 1800, d. April 1, 1833.
- Education: Middlebury College

Eli Porter Ashmun (June 24, 1770 – May 10, 1819) was a Federalist United States Senator from Massachusetts from 1816 to 1818.

== Early years ==
Eli Porter Ashmun was the eldest child of Justus and Kezia Ashmun. He was born in the vicinity of Fort Edward, New York, from whence the family fled in 1777 during the advance of British troops of John Burgoyne in the Saratoga campaign of the American Revolutionary War. They settled in Blandford, Massachusetts, where Ashmun's father operated a tavern. Ashmun's education was quite rudimentary, but he was taken under wing by Theodore Sedgwick, who gave him legal training. He was eventually admitted to the bar, and opened the first legal practice in Blandford. He married Lucy Hooker, daughter of John Hooker of Northampton, with whom he had five children.

In 1807, Ashmun was awarded an honorary degree by Middlebury College, and moved to Northampton where he continued his law practice.

== Political career ==
In 1807, Ashmun won election to the Massachusetts Senate, serving from 1808 to 1810. In 1816, he served with the Massachusetts Governor's Council. Following the resignation of United States Senator Christopher Gore, he was elected by the state legislature to replace him, serving from June 12, 1816, to May 10, 1818. He died in 1819, possibly of heart disease, and is interred in Northampton's Bridge Street Cemetery.

Ashmun was the father of George Ashmun (1804–1870), who served in the U.S. House of Representatives, and of John Hooker Ashmun. The latter served as a partner in his father's law practice, and operated the Northampton Law School for several years. He then became a prominent legal instructor at Harvard Law School.

== Notes ==
U.S. Senate
Preceded by Christopher Gore	U.S. senator (Class 1) from Massachusetts; 1816–1818; Served alongside: Joseph B. Varnum, Harrison Gray Otis	Succeeded by Prentiss Mellen
