= Robert C. Winthrop =

American politician (1809–1894)

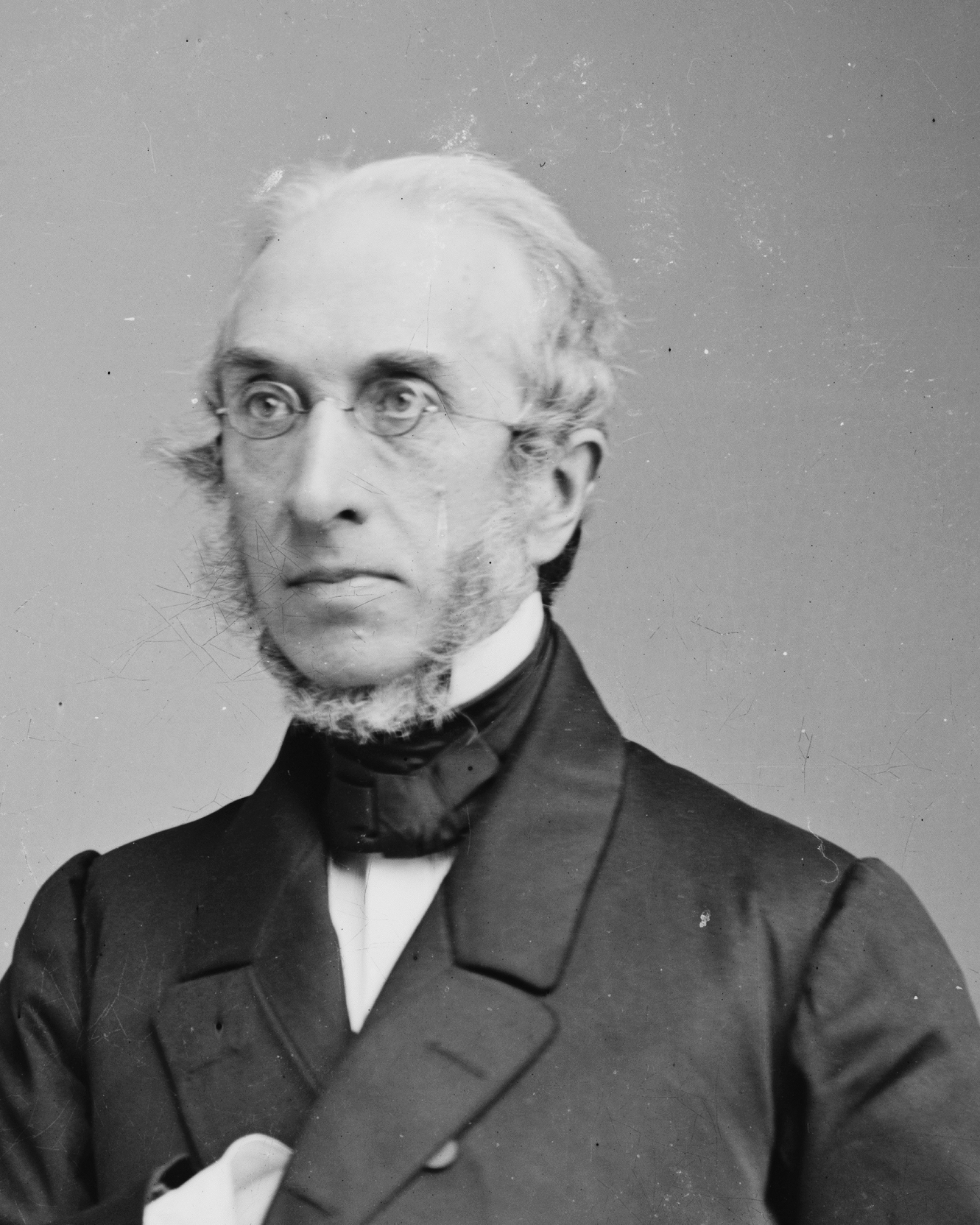
- Winthrop c. 1855–65

United States Senator from Massachusetts
- In office July 30, 1850 – February 1, 1851
- Appointed by: George N. Briggs
- Preceded by: Daniel Webster
- Succeeded by: Robert Rantoul Jr.

18th Speaker of the United States House of Representatives
- In office December 6, 1847 – March 4, 1849
- Preceded by: John Davis
- Succeeded by: Howell Cobb

Member of the U.S. House of Representatives from Massachusetts's 1st district
- In office November 9, 1840 – May 25, 1842
- Preceded by: Abbott Lawrence
- Succeeded by: Nathan Appleton
- In office November 29, 1842 – July 30, 1850
- Preceded by: Nathan Appleton
- Succeeded by: Samuel Eliot

Personal details
- Born: Robert Charles Winthrop; May 12, 1809 Boston, Massachusetts, U.S.
- Died: November 16, 1894 (aged 85) Boston, Massachusetts, U.S.
- Party: Whig
- Spouses: Elizabeth Cabot Blanchard (m. 1832; died 1842) Laura Derby Welles (m. 1849; died 1861) Adele Granger Thayer (m. 1865; died 1892)
- Relations: Thomas Winthrop (father); John Kerry (great-grandson); James Bowdoin (great-grandfather)
- Education: Harvard University (BA)
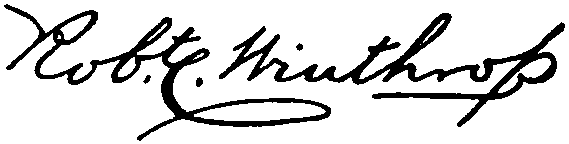
- Signature

Robert Charles Winthrop (May 12, 1809 – November 16, 1894) was an American lawyer, philanthropist, and Whig Party politician who represented Massachusetts in the United States House and Senate from 1840 to 1851. He served as the 18th speaker of the United States House of Representatives and was a political ally and colleague of Daniel Webster. After a rapid rise in Massachusetts and national politics and one term as speaker, Winthrop succeeded Webster in the Senate. His re-election campaign resulted in a long, sharply contested defeat by Charles Sumner. He ran for Governor of Massachusetts in 1851 but lost due to the state's majority requirement, marking the end of his political career and signaling the decline of the Massachusetts Whig Party.

Winthrop was born into a prominent Boston political family, descended from colonial governors Thomas Dudley and John Winthrop and commonwealth governor James Bowdoin, his great-grandfather. After an education at Boston Latin School and Harvard College, he studied law with Webster and was admitted to the bar in 1831. In 1835, at the age of twenty-four, he was elected to the Massachusetts House of Representatives and served five one-year terms. From 1838 to 1840, he served as speaker of the Massachusetts House.

In 1840, Winthrop won a special election to succeed Abbott Lawrence in the United States House of Representatives, representing Boston. He was re-elected to a full term but resigned early in 1842 to mourn the death of his young wife. After only six months out of office, his successor Nathan Appleton resigned, and he was elected to succeed him. Winthrop served out the remainder of the term and was elected three more times. In 1847, he was elected Speaker of the House at the start the 30th Congress. However, he lost re-election in 1849 to Howell Cobb of Georgia after a protracted sixty-six ballot contest.

In July 1850, Daniel Webster resigned from the United States Senate to become Secretary of State amid outrage over his support for the Compromise of 1850. Governor George Briggs appointed Winthrop to succeed him, but the 1850 Massachusetts elections resulted in a three-way split of the legislature between Whigs and the Democratic and Free Soil parties, which joined in an anti-Whig coalition. After a divisive fifty-one ballot election, Free Soilers and anti-slavery Democrats united to elect Charles Sumner, an abolitionist lawyer, to the seat. Winthrop made a final run for public office in November of that year when he stood for governor but was again defeated by the Free Soil-Democratic coalition. Though he received a plurality of all votes cast, the majority rule in place at the time sent the election to the Massachusetts General Court, where the coalition legislators again denied Winthrop by re-electing Governor George S. Boutwell. For the remainder of his life, Winthrop remained publicly involved as a Christian conservative and unionist but never again ran for public office.

== Early life ==
Robert Charles Winthrop was born in Boston, Massachusetts, to Thomas Lindall Winthrop (1760–1841), the lieutenant governor of Massachusetts, and Elizabeth Bowdoin Temple (1769–1825), who were married on July 25, 1786. He was the youngest of 13 children.

His maternal grandparents were Sir John Temple, 8th Baronet (1731–1798), the first British envoy to the United States, and Elizabeth Bowdoin, the daughter of James Bowdoin (1726–1790), the governor of Massachusetts. His paternal great-great-grandfathers were Joseph Dudley (1647–1720) and Wait Still Winthrop (1641/2–1717).

Winthrop attended the prestigious Boston Latin School, and graduated from Harvard University in 1828, which he attended with Dr. Henry Ingersoll Bowditch, George Stillman Hillard, Judge John Gilchrist, Edward Sprague Rand, and others of note.

== Career ==
After studying law with Daniel Webster he was admitted to the bar in 1831 and practiced in Boston. At 24, he served in the Massachusetts House of Representatives from 1835 to 1840, and served as Speaker of the House of that body from 1838 to 1840. He was elected a member of the American Antiquarian Society in 1838.

Winthrop was elected US Representative from Massachusetts as a Whig to the 26th United States Congress to fill the vacancy caused by the resignation of Abbott Lawrence; he was reelected to the 27th Congress and served from November 9, 1840, to May 25, 1842, when he resigned due to the death of his wife.

He was subsequently elected to the 27th Congress to fill the vacancy caused by the resignation of his successor, Nathan Appleton; he was reelected to the 28th and to the three succeeding Congresses and served from November 29, 1842, until July 30, 1850. He served as the speaker of the House during the 30th Congress (1847–1849), but could not secure a second term, losing the 1849 speakership election to Howell Cobb in a protracted 63-ballot contest. He was elected a Fellow of the American Academy of Arts and Sciences in 1849.

On February 21, 1848, a discussion was occurring in the House on whether or not to honor United States Army officers who served in the Mexican-American War. John Quincy Adams, former US president and current Representative, had been a vehement critic of the war, and as Congressmen rose up to say, "Aye!" in favor of the measure, he instead yelled, "No!" A question was put forth by Winthrop, to which Adams stood, but immediately collapsed, suffering an ultimately fatal cerebral hemmorage, making Winthrop the last person to speak to Adams before his stroke. Adams died two days later, in Winthrop's Speakers Room.

After Daniel Webster resigned from the United States Senate to become Secretary of State in 1850, Winthrop resigned from the House and, at 41, was appointed by fellow Whig governor George Briggs to fill the remainder of Webster's Senate term. Winthrop's views proved no more palatable to abolitionists than did Webster's, and he failed to win reelection by the state legislature to either of Massachusetts' Senate seats in 1851. He resigned without completing his term immediately following his election loss. Later that year, Winthrop actually won a popular plurality in the race for Massachusetts governor but as the state Constitution required a majority, the election was thrown into the legislature. The same coalition of Democrats and Free Soilers defeated him again. His final venture into elected political office was as a presidential elector on the Whig ticket in 1852. Afterwards, Winthrop became an independent, unsuccessfully supporting Millard Fillmore, John Bell, and George McClellan.

=== Later career ===
With his political career over at the young age of 43, Winthrop spent the remainder of his life in literary, historical, and philanthropic pursuits. He was a major early patron of the Boston Public Library and president of the Massachusetts Historical Society from 1855 to 1885, during which time he wrote a biography of his ancestor John Winthrop. In 1880, he was elected a member of the American Philosophical Society. He served as the president of the Massachusetts Bible Society for several years where he advocated that Christian morality was the necessary condition of a free society. His most notable Christian philosophy for governing men, was as follows:

Men, in a word, must necessarily be controlled either by a power within them or by a power without them; either by the Word of God or by the strong arm of man; either by the Bible or by the bayonet.

His most notable contributions came as permanent chairman and president of the Peabody Education Fund Trustees, which he served from 1867 to his death. As well as steering the contributions of the Peabody Trust, Winthrop gave his own money to various Southern schools, the most long lasting of which was the $1,500 of seed money provided to a teacher's college that renamed itself Winthrop University in gratitude. He became a noted orator, delivering two speeches in 1870: the eulogy for George Peabody and on the celebration of the landing of the Pilgrims. He also spoke at the ceremony that opened the Washington Monument in 1848. Winthrop was elected a member of the American Antiquarian Society in October 1894.

In 1892, in a celebration of his birth, it was noted that he had the distinction of having known every President of the United States except Washington and Jefferson.

== Personal life ==
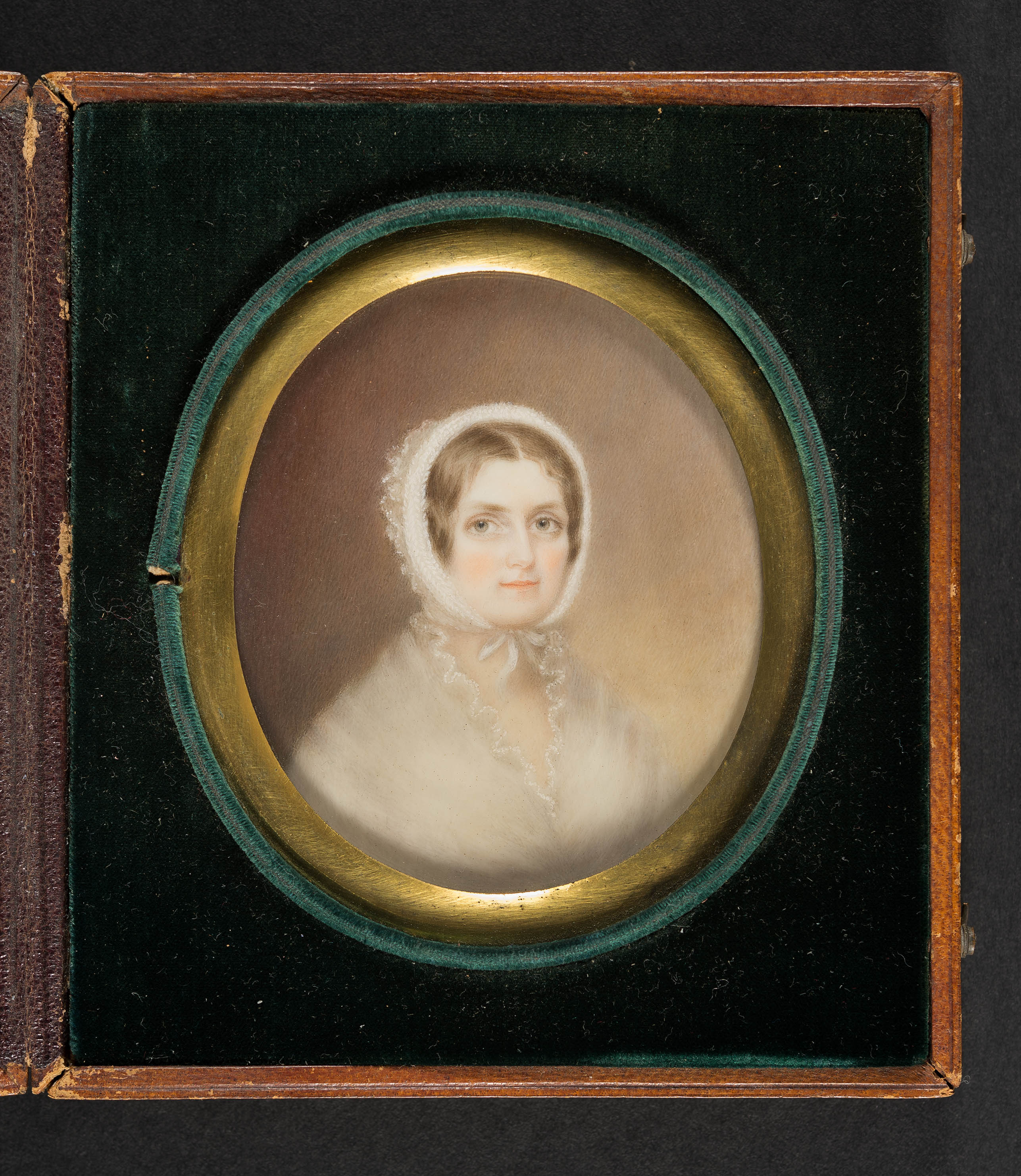
Elizabeth Cabot Blanchard Winthrop

On March 12, 1832, he married Elizabeth Cabot Blanchard (1809–1842), the daughter of Francis Blanchard (1784–1813) and Mary Ann Cabot (1784–1809), and the adopted daughter of Samuel P. Gardner. Elizabeth's elder half-brother was banker John Clarke Lee, founder of Lee, Higginson & Co. Before her death, Robert and Elizabeth had three children:

- Robert Charles Winthrop Jr. (1834–1905), who married Frances Pickering Adams (1836–1860). After her death, he married Elizabeth Mason (1844–1924), daughter of Robert Means Mason (1810–1879) and Sarah Ellen Francis (1819–1865) and granddaughter of Jeremiah Mason, on June 1, 1869.
- Elizabeth "Eliza" Cabot Winthrop (1838–1921)
- John Winthrop (b. 1841)

After Elizabeth's death, he married his second wife, Laura (née Derby) Welles, widow of Arnold Francis Welles. Laura was the daughter of attorney John Derby and granddaughter of Elias Hasket Derby, on November 6, 1849. They remained married until her death in 1861.

On November 15, 1865, he married for the third and final time, to Adele (née Granger) Thayer (1820–1892), the widow of John E. Thayer. She was the daughter of Francis Granger, the postmaster general under President William Henry Harrison and Cornelia Rutsen Van Rensselaer.

Winthrop died in Boston in 1894, and is interred in Mount Auburn Cemetery, Cambridge, Massachusetts. In his will, he left bequests to the Massachusetts Historical Society, the Boston Provident Association, the Boston Children's Hospital, the Library of the Boston Latin School, and the library of the Sunday school of Trinity Church, Boston.

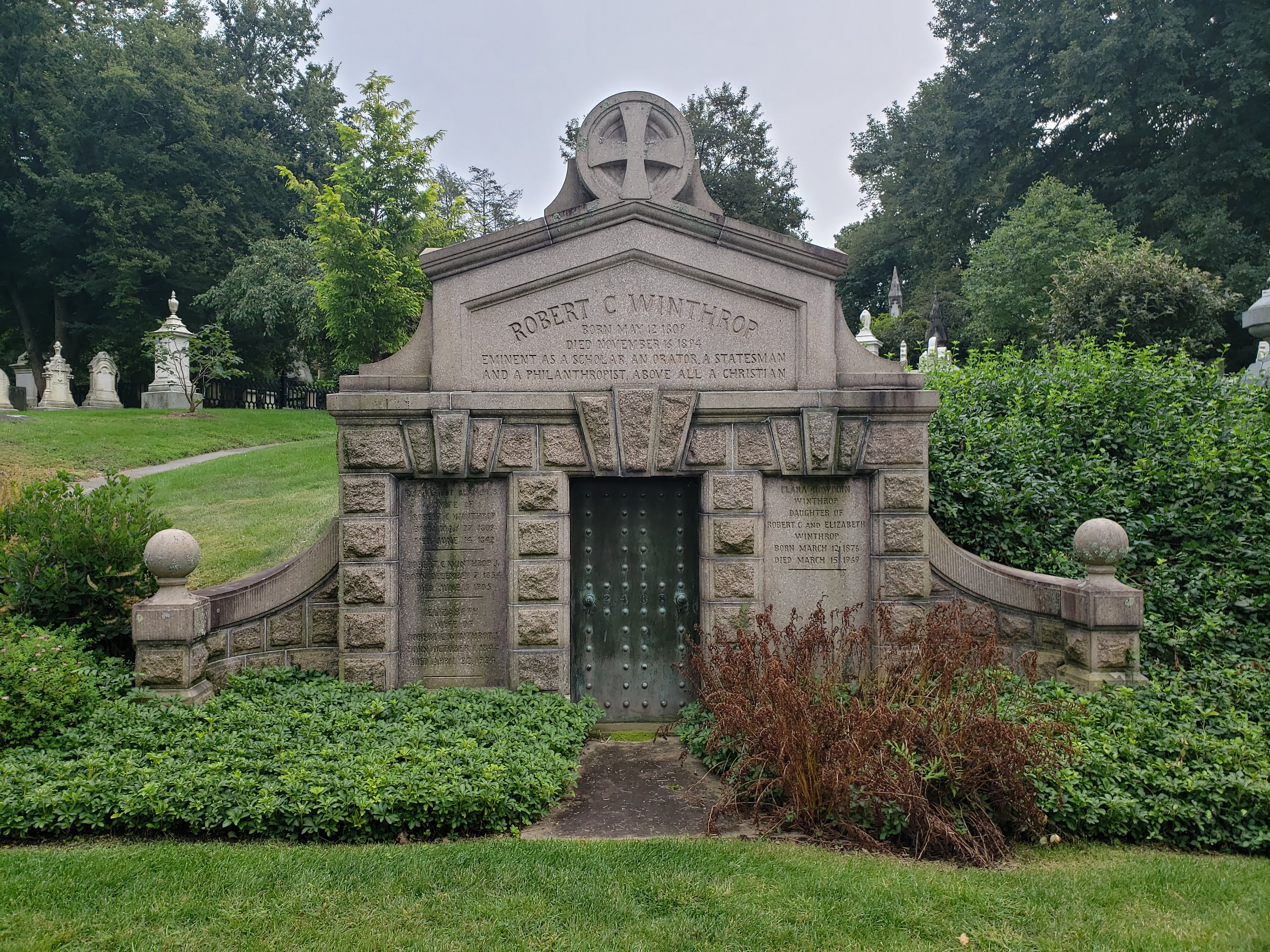
Robert C. Winthrop mausoleum in Mount Auburn Cemetery

=== Descendants ===
His granddaughter, Robert Jr.'s daughter Margaret Tyndal Winthrop (1880–1970), married James Grant Forbes on November 28, 1906. James and Margaret were the parents of Rosemary Isabel Forbes, who married Richard John Kerry and were the parents of John Forbes Kerry, the U.S. secretary of state, U.S. senator from Massachusetts. James and Margaret also are the parents of Fiona Diedre Forbes (1924–2010), who married Alain Gauthier Lalonde (1913–1974), the parents of Brice Lalonde, French Minister of the Environment and 1981 French presidential candidate.

== See also ==
- 59th Massachusetts General Court (1838)
- 60th Massachusetts General Court (1839)
- 61st Massachusetts General Court (1840)

Political offices
Preceded by Julius Rockwell	Speaker of the Massachusetts House of Representatives; 1838–1840	Succeeded by George Ashmun
Preceded by John Davis	Speaker of the United States House of Representatives; 1847–1849	Succeeded by Howell Cobb
U.S. House of Representatives
Preceded by Abbott Lawrence	Member of the U.S. House of Representatives from Massachusetts's 1st congressional district 1840–1842	Succeeded by Nathan Appleton
Preceded by Nathan Appleton	Member of the U.S. House of Representatives from Massachusetts's 1st congressional district 1842–1850	Succeeded by Samuel Eliot
U.S. Senate
Preceded by Daniel Webster	U.S. Senator (Class 1) from Massachusetts; 1850–1851; Served alongside: John Davis	Succeeded by Robert Rantoul Jr.
Party political offices
Preceded by George N. Briggs	Whig nominee for Governor of Massachusetts; 1851	Succeeded by John H. Clifford
