= George T. Davis =

American politician

Member of the U.S. House of Representatives from Massachusetts's 6th district
- In office March 4, 1851 – March 3, 1853
- Preceded by: George Ashmun
- Succeeded by: Charles Wentworth Upham

Member of the Massachusetts House of Representatives
- In office 1861–1861

Member of the Massachusetts Senate
- In office 1839–1840

Personal details
- Born: George Thomas Davis; January 12, 1810 Sandwich, Massachusetts, U.S.
- Died: June 17, 1877 (aged 67) Portland, Maine, U.S.
- Resting place: Green River Cemetery, Greenfield, Massachusetts, U.S.
- Party: Whig
- Education: Cambridge and Greenfield, Massachusetts
- Occupation: Politician
- Profession: Law

George Thomas Davis (January 12, 1810 – June 17, 1877) was a U.S. representative from Massachusetts.

== Early life and education ==
George Davis was born in Sandwich, Massachusetts. He attended Harvard University and graduated in 1829. His classmates included William Henry Channing, James Freeman Clarke, Benjamin Robbins Curtis, Oliver Wendell Holmes Sr., Benjamin Peirce, and Samuel Francis Smith. He later studied law at Cambridge and Greenfield, Massachusetts.

== Career ==
Davis was admitted to the bar in 1832 and commenced practice in Greenfield, Franklin County. He established the Franklin Mercury in 1833.

He entered into politics served as member of the State Senate in 1839 and 1840.

He was elected as a Whig to the 32nd Congress (March 4, 1851 – March 3, 1853). He was not a candidate for renomination in 1852 and instead resumed the practice of law in Taunton and Greenfield, Massachusetts.

He did not give up on politics however and served as member of the State House of Representatives in 1861.

== Later life and death ==
Davis moved to Portland, Maine, where he died June 17, 1877. He was interred in Green River Cemetery, Greenfield, Massachusetts.

U.S. House of Representatives
Preceded by George Ashmun	Member of the U.S. House of Representatives from Massachusetts's 6th congressional district March 4, 1851 – March 3, 1853	Succeeded by Charles W. Upham
