= Samuel H. Walley =

American politician

Samuel Hurd Walley

Member of the U.S. House of Representatives from Massachusetts's 4th district
- In office March 4, 1853 – March 3, 1855
- Preceded by: Lorenzo Sabine
- Succeeded by: Linus Bacon Comins

Speaker of the Massachusetts House of Representatives
- In office 1844–1846
- Preceded by: Thomas Kinnicut
- Succeeded by: Ebenezer Bradbury

Member of the Massachusetts House of Representatives Norfolk District
- In office 1840–1846

Member of the Massachusetts House of Representatives Norfolk District
- In office 1836–1836

Personal details
- Born: August 31, 1805
- Died: August 27, 1877 (aged 71) Nantasket Beach, Massachusetts, US
- Party: Whig
- Spouse(s): Mehetable Sumner Bates, d. December 2, 1853. Ann Gray Hawes
- Children: Henshaw Bates Walley, William Phillips Walley
- Education: Harvard, 1826
- Profession: Attorney, Banker

Samuel Hurd Walley (August 31, 1805 – August 27, 1877) was a Massachusetts businessman and politician who served as Speaker of the Massachusetts House of Representatives and as a member of the U.S. representative from Massachusetts.

== Early life ==
Walley was born in Boston, Massachusetts to Samuel Hall Walley and Miriam (Phillips) Walley. Walley was the grandson of William Phillips, Jr., Lieutenant Governor of Massachusetts from 1812 to 1823, and was a descendant of Rev. George Phillips of Watertown, the progenitor of the New England Phillips family in America.

== Family ==
Walley was married twice. Walley married his first wife Mehetable Sumner Bates on October 14, 1829, they had ten children, Mehetable Walley died December 2, 1853. Walley's second wife was Ann Gray Hawes.

== Education ==
Walley attended the common schools and Phillips Academy, Andover, Massachusetts. Walley attended Yale College in 1822. Walley entered Harvard at the beginning of his sophomore year. Walley graduated from Harvard in 1826.

== Business career ==
After he left college Walley studied law and was admitted to the Suffolk bar in 1831. Walley practiced in Boston and Roxbury.

Walley engaged in banking, he took a prominent part in the organization of the Suffolk Savings Bank. Walley was involved in the creation of the Revere National Bank, and from 1870 until his death he served as its first President.

Walley was involved in railroad development he was the Treasurer of the Vermont Central Railroad, treasurer of the Ogdensburg railroad and a promoter and first treasurer of the Wisconsin Central Railroad.

== Political offices ==
Walley served as member of the Massachusetts House of Representatives in 1836 and 1840–1846, serving as speaker 1844–1846. Walley served as a corporate member of the American Board of Commissioners for Foreign Missions 1848–1867.

Walley was elected as a Whig to the Thirty-third Congress (March 4, 1853 – March 3, 1855). Walley was an unsuccessful candidate for reelection in 1854 to the Thirty-fourth Congress. Walley was an unsuccessful Whig candidate for Governor of Massachusetts in 1855.

== Death ==
Walley died at Nantasket Beach, Massachusetts, on August 27, 1877.

== See also ==
- 65th Massachusetts General Court (1844)

== Footnotes ==
Party political offices
Preceded by Emory Washburn	Whig nominee for Governor of Massachusetts; 1855	Succeeded by Luther Vose Bell
U.S. House of Representatives
Preceded by Lorenzo Sabine	Member of the U.S. House of Representatives from Massachusetts's 4th congressional district March 4, 1853 – March 3, 1855	Succeeded by Linus B. Comins
