= Myron Lawrence =

American politician

President of the Massachusetts Senate
- In office 1837–1840
- Preceded by: Horace Mann
- Succeeded by: Daniel P. King

Member of the Massachusetts Senate from Hampshire County
- In office January 7, 1835 – December 31, 1839 Serving with Eliphalet Williams (1835); William Clark Jr. (1838–39)
- Preceded by: John Leland
- Succeeded by: William Bowdoin; Timothy A. Phelps
- In office January 3, 1844 – January 6, 1846 Serving with Benjamin Burrett (1844–45)
- Preceded by: Edward Dickinson; Samuel Williston
- Succeeded by: Chauncey B. Rising; Joseph B. Woods
- In office 1852

Member of the Massachusetts House of Representatives
- In office 1827–1828

Personal details
- Born: May 18, 1799 Middlebury, Vermont
- Died: November 7, 1852 (aged 53) Belchertown, Massachusetts
- Spouse: Clarissa Dwight
- Children: Sarah T. D. Lawrence
- Education: Middlebury College
- Profession: Lawyer

Myron Lawrence (May 18, 1799 – November 7, 1852) was a Massachusetts lawyer and politician who served in both branches of the Massachusetts General Court and served as the President of the Massachusetts Senate.

== Early life ==
Lawrence, the son of Benjamin Lawrence, was born in Middlebury, Vermont, on May 18, 1799.

== Education ==
Lawrence attended Addison County Grammar School. In 1820, he graduated from Middlebury College where, from 1851 to 1852, he was a trustee. Lawrence read law in the office of Hon. Mark Doolittle of Belchertown, Massachusetts.

== Legal career ==
After reading law and passing the Massachusetts Bar, Lawrence practiced law in Belchertown, Massachusetts, until his death on November 7, 1852.

== Family life ==
On March 28, 1824, Lawrence married Clarissa Dwight, daughter of Colonel Henry Dwight and Ruth Rich. They had three children, including Sara (1827-1912), an antislavery activist and writer during the Bleeding Kansas period of the 1850s. When her husband Charles L. Robinson was took office as Governor of Kansas in 1861, Sara became the inaugural First Lady of Kansas.

== Public service ==
Lawrence served in the Massachusetts House of Representatives in 1827-1828 and 1849-1850, in the Massachusetts Senate in 1835-1839, 1844–46 and 1852, as the President of the Massachusetts Senate from 1837 to 1840, and as a member of the 1844 commission on the Boundary line between Massachusetts and Rhode Island.

== Death ==
Lawrence died in Belchertown, Massachusetts, on November 7, 1852.

Massachusetts Senate
Preceded by Horace Mann	President of the Massachusetts Senate; 1838-1839	Succeeded by Daniel P. King

== See also ==
- 59th Massachusetts General Court (1838)
- 60th Massachusetts General Court (1839)
