= Obed Barney =

American politician

Member of the Massachusetts Senate Nantucket and Dukes County District
- In office 1844–1844
- Succeeded by: William Mitchell

Member of the Massachusetts House of Representatives Nantucket District
- In office 1843–1843

Obed Barney was an American politician who served in the Massachusetts House of Representatives, and in the Massachusetts Senate.

== Political offices ==
Barney was a member of the Massachusetts House of Representatives in 1843, and a member of the Massachusetts Senate from the Nantucket and Dukes County District in 1844.

== Other activities ==
Barney married Lavinia Coffin in Nantucket on January 15, 1832.

In 1848 Barney's nephew Benjamin B. Myrick bought out a substantial lard oil business, with Barney becoming a partner in the business. The factory was destroyed by fire in 1855, but rebuilt with better equipment, and the partners sold the business in May 1857.
