= Daniel P. King =

American politician (1801–1850)

Daniel Putnam King
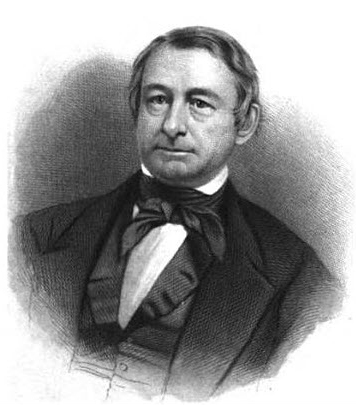

Member of the U.S. House of Representatives from Massachusetts's 2nd district
- In office March 4, 1843 – July 25, 1850
- Preceded by: Leverett Saltonstall
- Succeeded by: Robert Rantoul Jr.

Member of the Massachusetts Senate
- In office 1838–1841

Member of the Massachusetts House of Representatives
- In office 1836–1837; 1843–1844

Personal details
- Born: January 8, 1801 South Danvers, Massachusetts
- Died: July 25, 1850 (aged 49) South Danvers, Massachusetts
- Resting place: King Cemetery, Peabody, Massachusetts.
- Party: Whig
- Education: Harvard University
- Occupation: Agriculture

Daniel Putnam King (January 8, 1801 – July 25, 1850) was a U.S. representative from Massachusetts.

== Early life and education ==
Born in South Danvers, Massachusetts, now Peabody, Massachusetts King pursued classical studies at Phillips Academy, Andover, graduating in 1819. He graduated from Harvard University in 1823 and he also studied law.

== Business career ==
Although he studied law, King was not a practicing attorney, instead he engaged in agricultural pursuits.

== Service in the Massachusetts Legislature ==
King served as member of the Massachusetts House of Representatives in 1836 and 1837. King served in the Massachusetts State Senate from 1838 to 1841, and was its President in 1840. King was again a member of the Massachusetts House in 1843 and 1844 and served as Speaker in the latter year.

== Congressional service ==
King was elected as a Whig to the Twenty-eighth and to the three succeeding Congresses and served from March 4, 1843, until his death on July 25, 1850. King served as chairman of the Committee on Expenditures on Public Buildings (Twenty-eighth Congress), Committee on Accounts (Twenty-ninth through Thirty-first Congresses), Committee on Revolutionary Claims (Thirtieth Congress).

== Death and burial ==
King died in South Danvers, on July 25, 1850, he was interred in King Cemetery in Peabody.

== See also ==
- 61st Massachusetts General Court (1840)
- 62nd Massachusetts General Court (1841)
- 64th Massachusetts General Court (1843)
- List of members of the United States Congress who died in office (1790–1899)

Massachusetts Senate
Preceded by Myron Lawrence	President of the Massachusetts Senate; 1840-1841	Succeeded by Josiah Quincy Jr.
Massachusetts House of Representatives
Preceded by Thomas H. Kinnicutt	Speaker of the Massachusetts House of Representatives; 1843	Succeeded by Thomas H. Kinnicutt
U.S. House of Representatives
Preceded by Leverett Saltonstall	Member of the U.S. House of Representatives from Massachusetts's 2nd congressional district March 4, 1843 – July 25, 1850	Succeeded by Robert Rantoul Jr.
