= Amos Abbott =

American politician

Member of the U.S. House of Representatives from Massachusetts's 3rd district
- In office March 4, 1843 – March 3, 1849
- Preceded by: Caleb Cushing
- Succeeded by: James H. Duncan

Member of the Massachusetts House of Representatives
- In office 1835–1837
- In office 1843

Member of the Massachusetts Senate
- In office 1840–1842

Personal details
- Born: September 10, 1786 Andover, Massachusetts
- Died: November 2, 1868 (aged 82) Andover, Massachusetts
- Party: Whig

Amos Abbott (September 10, 1786, Andover, Massachusetts – November 2, 1868, Andover, Massachusetts) was a United States Congressman from Massachusetts.

Son of Jeduthan Abbott (1749–1810) and Hannah Poor (1754–1823), he was born in Andover, Massachusetts. He Married Ester Mackey West (1793-1850) on December 6, 1812. They had two children Alfred Amos Abbott, and Elizabeth Amos Abbott.

He was educated locally and attended Bradford Academy. He worked as a merchant, a highway surveyor, a market clerk, town clerk, town treasurer, a member of the school committee, a business executive. In 1833, he was one of the founders of the Boston & Portland railway, which later changed its name to the Boston & Maine Railroad, and served as its director from 1834 to 1841. He was a member of the Massachusetts House of Representatives from 1835 to 1837 and in 1843. He was a member of the Massachusetts Senate from 1840 to 1842.

Abbott was elected as a Whig to the United States Congress, serving from March 4, 1843, to March 3, 1849.

Following his term in Congress, he returned to his earlier mercantile activities and served as the postmaster in Andover, where he died, aged 82.

U.S. House of Representatives
Preceded by Caleb Cushing	Member of the U.S. House of Representatives from Massachusetts's 3rd congressional district March 4, 1843–March 3, 1849	Succeeded by James H. Duncan
