= George Ashmun =

American politician

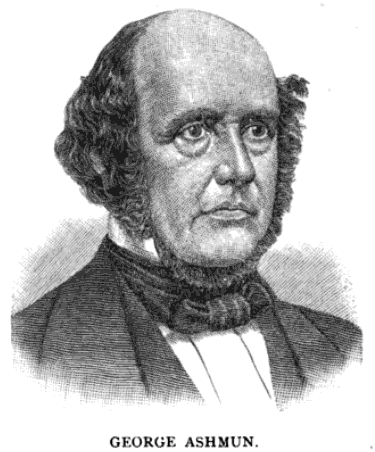

Member of the U.S. House of Representatives from Massachusetts's 6th district
- In office March 4, 1845 – March 3, 1851
- Preceded by: Osmyn Baker
- Succeeded by: George T. Davis

Speaker of the Massachusetts House of Representatives
- In office 1841–1841
- Preceded by: Robert Charles Winthrop
- Succeeded by: Thomas Kinnicut

Member of the Massachusetts Senate
- In office 1838–1840

Member of the Massachusetts House of Representatives
- In office 1833–1837

Personal details
- Born: December 25, 1804 Blandford, Massachusetts, U.S.
- Died: July 16, 1870 (aged 66) Springfield, Massachusetts, U.S.
- Party: Whig, Republican

George Ashmun (December 25, 1804 – July 16, 1870) was a Whig member of the U.S. House of Representatives from Massachusetts.

Ashmun was born in Blandford, Massachusetts, to Eli P. Ashmun and Lucy Hooker. He graduated from Yale College in 1823 and was married to Martha E. Hall in 1828. He served in the Massachusetts House of Representatives from 1833 to 1837, and the Massachusetts Senate from 1838 to 1840. In 1841, he returned to the Massachusetts House where he served as Speaker.

Ashmun was elected to the U.S. Congress from the Sixth District of Massachusetts in 1844, held office from 1845 to 1851 and was a member of the committees on the judiciary, Indian affairs, and rules. He opposed the Mexican–American War, and was a strong supporter of Daniel Webster.

== And the birth of the Republican Party ==
After leaving Congress, Ashmun moved to Springfield, Massachusetts, where he spent the rest of his life practicing law in the firm Chapman & Ashmun, founded with Reuben A. Chapman. There he met newspaper publisher Samuel Bowles (journalist), with whom he helped to found the U.S. Republican Party. Immediately, Ashmun joined the Republican Party, and presided over the Republican Party's convention in 1860 that nominated Abraham Lincoln for President.

== Death ==
George Ashmun died in Springfield, Massachusetts, on July 16, 1870. He was buried in Springfield Cemetery.

== See also ==
- 62nd Massachusetts General Court (1841)

U.S. House of Representatives
Preceded by Osmyn Baker	Member of the U.S. House of Representatives from Massachusetts's 6th congressional district March 4, 1845 – March 3, 1851	Succeeded by George T. Davis
Massachusetts House of Representatives
Preceded by Robert Charles Winthrop	Speaker of the Massachusetts House of Representatives; 1841	Succeeded by Thomas Kinnicut
