= 1844–45 United States House of Representatives elections =

House elections for the 29th U.S. Congress

- July 1, 1844 – November 4, 1845 (Note: Excludes states admitted during the 29th Congress)

All 228 (Note: Includes late elections) (Note: There was one vacancy in New Hampshire's delegation, unfilled for the duration of the 29th Congress.) seats in the United States House of Representatives 115 seats needed for a majority
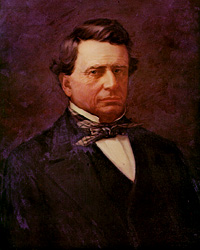

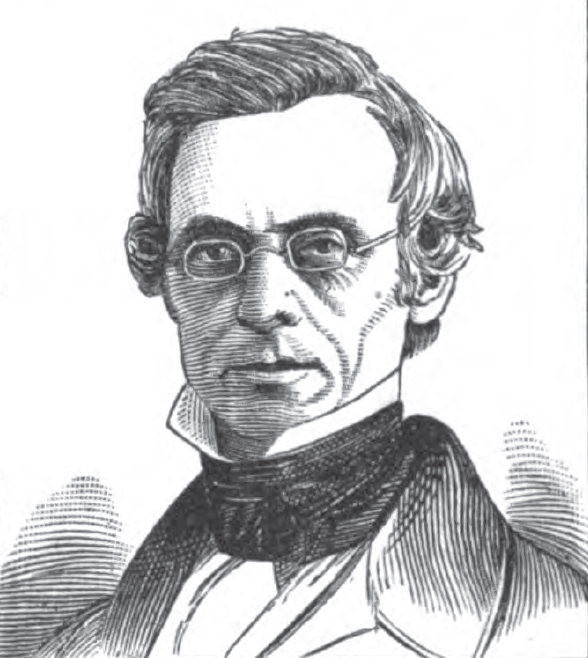
	Majority party	Minority party
Leader	John Davis	Samuel F. Vinton
Party	Democratic	Whig
Leader's seat	Indiana 6th	Ohio 12th
Last election	147 seats	72 seats
Seats won	142	79
Seat change	▼5	▲7
Popular vote	1,274,270	1,144,263
Percentage	50.10%	44.99%
Swing	▼1.94 pp	▲0.79 pp
	Third party	Fourth party
Leader	William S. Miller
Party	Know Nothing	Law and Order
Leader's seat	New York 3rd
Last election	Pre-creation	2 seats
Seats won	6	0
Seat change	▲6	▼2
Popular vote	53,413	3,030
Percentage	2.10%	0.12%
Swing	New Party	▼0.23 pp
	Fifth party
Party	Independent
Last election	2 seats (Note: Includes one Independent and one Independent Whig.)
Seats won	0
Seat change	▼2
Popular vote	13,370
Percentage	0.53%
Swing	▲0.18 pp
- Results: Democratic hold Democratic gain Whig hold Whig gain Know Nothing gain
Speaker before election
John Jones
Democratic
Elected Speaker
John Davis
Democratic

The 1844–45 United States House of Representatives elections were held on various dates in various states between July 1, 1844, and November 4, 1845. Each state set its own date for its elections to the House of Representatives. 224 elected members representing 27 states took their seats when the first session of the 29th United States Congress convened on December 1, 1845. The new U. S. state of Florida elected its first representative during this election cycle, while one vacancy in New Hampshire's delegation remained unfilled for the duration of the 29th Congress.

The House elections spanned the 1844 presidential election, won by dark horse Democratic candidate James K. Polk, who advocated territorial expansion.

Democrats lost six seats but retained a large majority over the rival Whigs. The new Native American Party, based on the nativist "Know Nothing" movement characterized by opposition to immigration and anti-Catholicism, gained six seats.

== Election summaries ==
One seat was added for the new state of Florida. Texas and Iowa were admitted during this next Congress, but their initial elections were held in 1846.

↓
142	6	79
Democratic	(Note: There were 6 Know Nothings.)	Whig

State	Type	Date	Total seats	Democratic		Know Nothing		Whig	
State	Type	Date	Total seats	Seats	Change	Seats	Change	Seats	Change
Louisiana	District	July 1–3, 1844	4	3	▼1	0	Steady	1	▲1
Illinois	District	August 5, 1844	7	6	Steady	0	Steady	1	Steady
Missouri	At-large	August 5, 1844	5	5	Steady	0	Steady	0	Steady
Georgia	District (Note: Changed from at-large)	August 7, 1844	8	4	▼4	0	Steady	4	▲4
Vermont	District	September 3, 1844	4	1	Steady	0	Steady	3	Steady
Maine	District	September 9, 1844	7	6	▲1	0	Steady	1	▼1
Arkansas	At-large	October 8, 1844	1	1	Steady	0	Steady	0	Steady
Ohio	District	October 8, 1844	21	13	▲1	0	Steady	8	▼1
Pennsylvania	District	October 8, 1844	24	12	Steady	2	▲2	10	▼2
New Jersey	District	October 9, 1844	5	1	▼3	0	Steady	4	▲3
South Carolina	District	October 14–15, 1844	7	7	Steady	0	Steady	0	Steady
Michigan	District	November 5, 1844	3	3	Steady	0	Steady	0	Steady
Massachusetts	District	November 11, 1844	10	0	▼2	0	Steady	10	▲2
New York	District	November 11, 1844	34	21	▼3	4	▲4	9	▼1
Delaware	At-large	November 12, 1844	1	0	Steady	0	Steady	1	Steady
Late elections after the March 4, 1845 beginning of term
New Hampshire	At-large	March 11, 1845	4	3	▼1	0	Steady	0	Steady
Rhode Island	District	April 2, 1845	2	0	Steady	0	Steady	2	▲2 (Note: Previous election had 2 members of the short-lived Law and Order Party)
Connecticut	District	April 7, 1845	4	0	▼4	0	Steady	4	▲4
Virginia	District	April 24, 1845	15	14	▲2	0	Steady	1	▼2
Florida (Note: New state)	At-large	May 26, 1845	1	1	▲1	0	Steady	0	Steady
Alabama	District	August 4, 1845	7	6	Steady	0	Steady	1	Steady
Indiana	District	August 4, 1845	10	8	Steady	0	Steady	2	Steady
Kentucky	District	August 4, 1845	10	3	▼1	0	Steady	7	▲2
North Carolina	District	August 7, 1845	9	6	▲1	0	Steady	3	▼1
Tennessee	District	August 7, 1845	11	6	Steady	0	Steady	5	Steady
Maryland	District	October 1, 1845	6	4	▲4	0	Steady	2	▼4
Mississippi	At-large	November 3–4, 1845	4	4	Steady	0	Steady	0	Steady
Total			224	142 62.6%	▼6	6 2.6%	▲6	79 34.8%	▲6

Popular vote
Democratic	50.02%
Whig	44.79%
Know Nothing	2.09%
Law & Order	0.12%
Independent	1.25%
Others	1.73%

House seats
Democratic	61.67%
Whig	35.68%
Know Nothing	2.64%

== Special elections ==
- Louisiana's 4th district

== Alabama ==
Elections were held on August 4, 1845, after the March 4, 1845 beginning of the term, but before the House first convened in December 1845.

District	Incumbent			This race	
District	Member	Party	First elected	Results	Candidates
Alabama 1
Alabama 2
Alabama 3
Alabama 4
Alabama 5
Alabama 6
Alabama 7

== Arkansas ==
The election was held on October 8, 1844.

District	Incumbent			This race	
District	Member	Party	First elected	Results	Candidates
Arkansas at-large	Edward Cross	Democratic	1838	Incumbent retired. Democratic hold.	▌ ✓ Archibald Yell (Democratic) 59.3%; ▌David Walker (Whig) 40.1%; ▌Lewis B. Tully (Independent) 0.6%

== Connecticut ==
Elections were held on April 7, 1845, after the March 4, 1845 beginning of the term, but before the House first convened in December 1845.

District	Incumbent			This race	
District	Member	Party	First elected	Results	Candidates
Connecticut 1	Thomas H. Seymour	Democratic	1843	Incumbent lost re-election. Whig gain.	▌ ✓ James Dixon (Whig) 50.9%; ▌Thomas H. Seymour (Democratic) 46.5%; ▌Edward Hooker (Liberty) 2.4%
Connecticut 2	John Stewart	Democratic	1843	Incumbent lost re-election. Whig gain.	▌ ✓ Samuel D. Hubbard (Whig) 54.2%; ▌John Stewart (Democratic) 43.4%; ▌Ely Warner (Liberty) 2.8%
Connecticut 3	George S. Catlin	Democratic	1843	Incumbent retired. Whig gain.	▌ ✓ John A. Rockwell (Whig) 48.1%; ▌Noyes Billings (Democratic) 45.3%; ▌Sherman Wilson (Liberty) 6.6%
Connecticut 4	Samuel Simons	Democratic	1843	Incumbent retired. Whig gain.	▌ ✓ Truman Smith (Whig) 51.7%; ▌John Cotton Smith Jr. (Democratic) 44.6%; ▌Daniel K. Nash (Liberty) 2.3%; ▌Mason Cleveland (unknown) 0.7%

== Delaware ==
1844 United States House of Representatives election in Delaware
- November 12, 1844
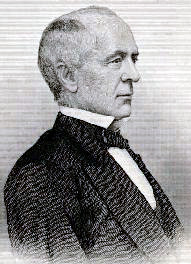

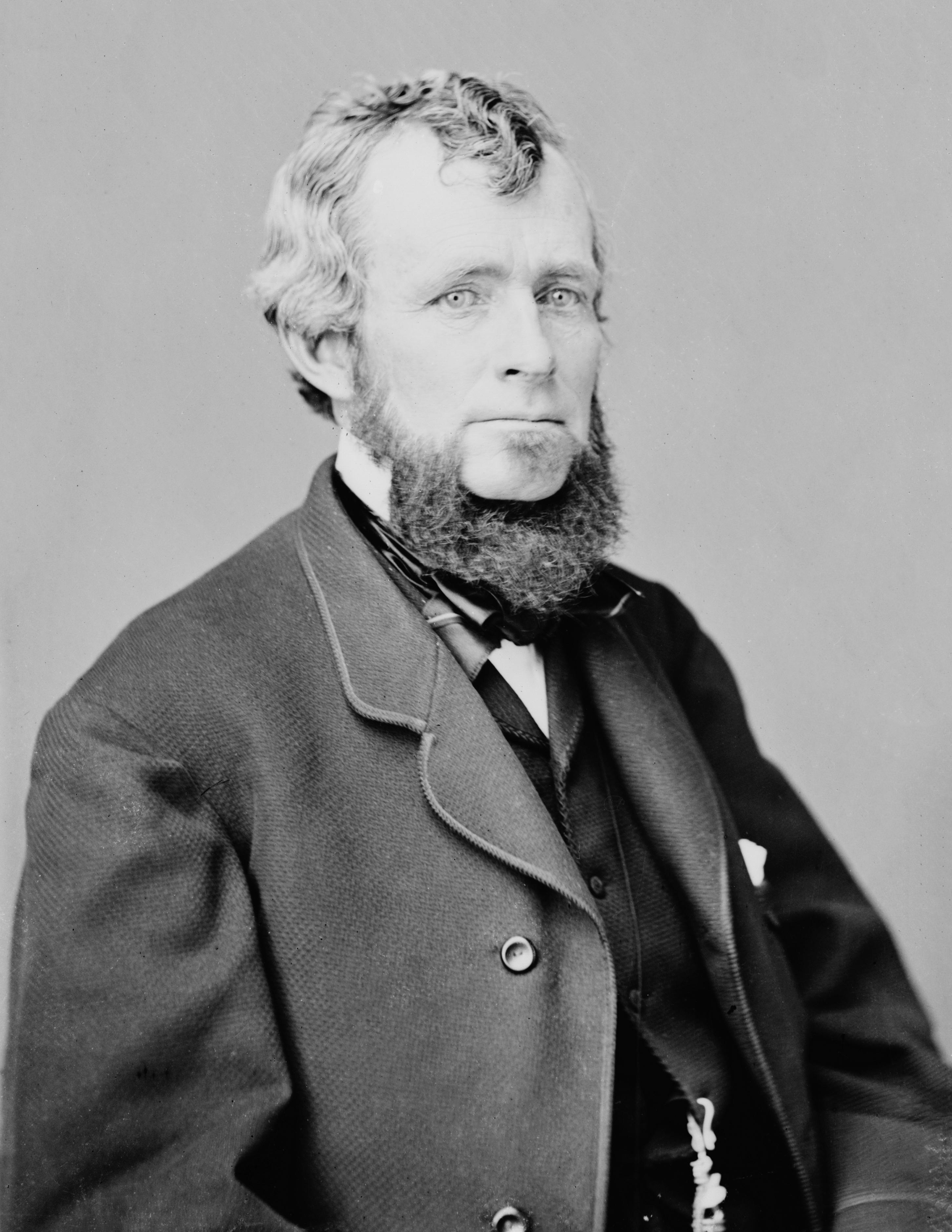
Nominee	John W. Houston	George R. Riddle
Party	Whig	Democratic
Popular vote	6,229	6,023
Percentage	50.84%	49.16%
- County results Houston: 50–60% Riddle: 50–60%
U.S. Representative before election
George B. Rodney
Whig
Elected U.S. Representative
John W. Houston
Whig

The election was held on November 12, 1844.

District	Incumbent			This race	
District	Member	Party	First elected	Results	Candidates
Delaware at-large	George B. Rodney	Whig	1840	Incumbent retired. Whig hold.	▌ ✓ John W. Houston (Whig) 50.8%; ▌ ✓ George R. Riddle (Democratic) 49.2%

== Florida ==
The election was held on May 26, 1845.

District	Incumbent			This race	
District	Member	Party	First elected	Results	Candidates
Florida at-large	None (New state)			New seat. New member elected late on May 26, 1845. Democratic gain. Winner did not serve, having also been elected U.S. senator.	▌ ✓ David Levy Yulee (Democratic) 60.3; ▌Benjamin A. Putnam (Whig) 39.7%

== Georgia ==
Elections were held on August 7, 1844.

District	Incumbent			This race	
District	Member	Party	First elected	Results	Candidates
Georgia 1	N/A	N/A	N/A	Whig gain.	▌ ✓ Thomas Butler King (Whig); ▌Charles Harris Spalding (Democratic)
Georgia 2	N/A	N/A	N/A	Democratic gain.	▌ ✓ Seaborn Jones (Democratic) 51.10%; ▌ William H Crawford (Whig) 48.90%
Georgia 3	Absalom H. Chappell; Redistricted from the at-large district	Democratic	1842	Incumbent lost re-election. Whig gain.	▌ ✓ Washington Poe (Whig) 50.73%; ▌Absalom H. Chappell (Democratic) 49.27%
Georgia 4	Hugh A. Haralson; Redistricted from the at-large district	Democratic	1842	Incumbent re-elected.	▌ ✓ Hugh A. Haralson (Democratic) 52.90%; ▌ John J Floyd (Whig) 47.10%
Georgia 5	John H. Lumpkin; Redistricted from the at-large district	Democratic	1842	Incumbent re-elected.	▌ ✓ John H. Lumpkin (Democratic) 61.33%; ▌ Homer V. M. Miller (Whig) 38.67%
Georgia 5	William H. Stiles; Redistricted from the at-large district	Democratic	1842	Incumbent retired. Democratic loss.	▌ ✓ John H. Lumpkin (Democratic) 61.33%; ▌ Homer V. M. Miller (Whig) 38.67%
Georgia 6	Howell Cobb; Redistricted from the at-large district	Democratic	1842	Incumbent re-elected.	▌ ✓ Howell Cobb (Democratic) 58.98%; ▌ JWB Underwood (Whig) 41.02%
Georgia 7	Alexander H. Stephens; Redistricted from the at-large district	Whig	1843 (special)	Incumbent re-elected.	▌ ✓ Alexander H. Stephens (Whig) 57.12%; ▌Absalom Madison Janes (Democratic) 42.88%
Georgia 8	Edward J. Black; Redistricted from the at-large district	Democratic	1838; 1840 (lost); 1841 (special)	Incumbent lost re-election. Whig gain.	▌ ✓ Robert Toombs (Whig) 58.50%; ▌Edward J. Black (Democratic) 41.50%

== Illinois ==
Elections were held on August 5, 1844.

District	Incumbent			This race	
District	Member	Party	First elected	Results	Candidates
Illinois 1	Robert Smith	Democratic	1842	Incumbent re-elected.	▌ ✓ Robert Smith (Democratic) 64.5%; ▌ John Reynolds (Independent Democratic) 33.65%; ▌Robert Marshall (Liberty) 1.55%; Frederick Krafft (unknown) 0.11%; ▌ Joseph Gillespie (Whig) 0.02%; ▌ James Shields (Democratic) 0.01%; John R. Lovell (unknown) 0.01%
Illinois 2
Illinois 3
Illinois 4
Illinois 5
Illinois 6
Illinois 7

== Indiana ==
Elections were held on August 4, 1845, after the March 4, 1845 beginning of the term, but before the House first convened in December 1845.

District	Incumbent			This race	
District	Member	Party	First elected	Results	Candidates
Indiana 1	Robert D. Owen	Democratic	1843	Incumbent re-elected.	▌ ✓ Robert D. Owen (Democratic) 53.68%; ▌George P. Wilson (Whig) 46.32%
Indiana 2	Thomas J. Henley	Democratic	1843	Incumbent re-elected.	▌ ✓ Thomas J. Henley (Democratic) 53.10%; ▌Roger Martin (Whig) 46.90%
Indiana 3	Thomas Smith	Democratic	1843	Incumbent re-elected.	▌ ✓ Thomas Smith (Democratic) 51.13%; ▌Joseph C. Eggleston (Whig) 46.90%; ▌Angus C. McCoy (Liberty) 1.55%
Indiana 4	Caleb B. Smith	Whig	1843	Incumbent re-elected.	▌ ✓ Caleb B. Smith (Whig) 56.44%; ▌John Finley (Democratic) 37.15%; ▌Matthew R. Hull (Liberty) 6.42%
Indiana 5	William J. Brown	Democratic	1843	Incumbent retired. Democratic hold.	▌ ✓ William W. Wick (Democratic) 54.77%; ▌James P. Foley (Whig) 43.20%; ▌Asa Bales (Liberty) 2.03%
Indiana 6	John W. Davis	Democratic	1843	Incumbent re-elected.	▌ ✓ John W. Davis (Democratic) 60.90%; ▌ Eli P. Farmer (Whig) 39.10%
Indiana 7	Joseph A. Wright	Democratic	1843	Incumbent lost re-election. Whig gain.	▌ ✓ Edward W. McGaughey (Whig) 50.69%; ▌ Joseph A. Wright (Democratic) 49.31%
Indiana 8	John Pettit	Democratic	1843	Incumbent re-elected.	▌ ✓ John Pettit (Democratic) 51.64%; ▌Albert L. Holmes (Whig) 47.61%; ▌Elizur Deming (Liberty) 0.75%
Indiana 9	Samuel C. Sample	Whig	1843	Incumbent lost re-election. Democratic gain.	▌ ✓ Charles W. Cathcart (Democratic) 50.00%; ▌ Samuel C. Sample (Whig) 47.81%; ▌John J. Deming (Liberty) 2.19%
Indiana 10	Andrew Kennedy	Whig	1843	Incumbent re-elected.	▌ ✓ Andrew Kennedy (Whig) 49.99%; ▌Lewis G. Thompson (Democratic) 46.95%; ▌Daniel Worth (Liberty) 3.06%

== Iowa Territory ==
See Non-voting delegates, below.

== Kentucky ==
Elections were held on August 4, 1845, after the March 4, 1845 beginning of the term, but before the House first convened in December 1845.

District	Incumbent			This race	
District	Member	Party	First elected	Results	Candidates
Kentucky 1
Kentucky 2
Kentucky 3
Kentucky 4
Kentucky 5
Kentucky 6
Kentucky 7
Kentucky 8
Kentucky 9
Kentucky 10

== Louisiana ==
Elections were held on July 1–3, 1844.

District	Incumbent			This race	
District	Member	Party	First elected	Results	Candidates
Louisiana 1
Louisiana 2
Louisiana 3
Louisiana 4

== Maine ==
Elections were held on September 9, 1844.

District	Incumbent			This race	
District	Member	Party	First elected	Results	Candidates
Maine 1
Maine 2
Maine 3
Maine 4
Maine 5
Maine 6
Maine 7

== Maryland ==
=== Late elections to the 28th Congress ===
Maryland elected its members to the 28th Congress on February 14, 1844, after that Congress had already convened in 1843 and long after the 1842–1843 election cycle.

District	Incumbent			This race	
District	Member	Party	First elected	Results	Candidates
Maryland 1	Isaac D. Jones	Whig	1841	Unknown if incumbent retired or lost re-election. Whig hold.	▌ ✓ John Causin (Whig) 57.94%; ▌Walter Bowie (Democratic) 42.06%
Maryland 2
Maryland 3
Maryland 4
Maryland 5
Maryland 6

=== Regular elections to the 29th Congress ===
Maryland's October 1, 1845 elections were after the March 4, 1845 beginning of the new term, but still before the Congress convened in December 1845.

District	Incumbent			This race	
District	Member	Party	First elected	Results	Candidates
Maryland 1	John Causin	Whig	1844	Unknown if incumbent retired or lost re-election. Whig hold.	▌ ✓ John Grant Chapman (Whig) 52.18%; ▌Henry G. Kay (Democratic) 47.82%
Maryland 2
Maryland 3
Maryland 4
Maryland 5
Maryland 6

== Massachusetts ==
Elections were held on November 11, 1844. At least one district, however, had multiple ballots stretching into 1846.

District	Incumbent			This race	
District	Member	Party	First elected	Results	Candidates
Massachusetts 1
Massachusetts 2
Massachusetts 3
Massachusetts 4	William Parmenter	Democratic	1836	Incumbent lost re-election. New member elected on the second ballot. Whig gain.	First ballot (November 11, 1844): ▌Benjamin Thompson (Whig) 45.78%; ▌William Parmenter (Democratic) 44.52%; ▌Thomas M. Ward (Liberty) 8.55%; ▌Abraham R. Thompson (unknown) 1.15%; Second ballot (December 23, 1844): ▌ ✓ Benjamin Thompson (Whig) 51.71%; ▌William Parmenter (Democratic) 43.23%; ▌Thomas M. Ward (Liberty) 5.06%
Massachusetts 5
Massachusetts 6
Massachusetts 7	Julius Rockwell	Whig	1844 (late)	Incumbent re-elected.	▌ ✓ Julius Rockwell (Whig) 51.62%; ▌Increase Sumner (Democratic) 39.92%; ▌Joel Hayden (Liberty) 7.40%; ▌Caleb Bennett (unknown) 1.07%
Massachusetts 8	John Quincy Adams	Whig	1830	Incumbent re-elected.	▌ ✓ John Quincy Adams (Whig) 57.12%; ▌Isaac H. Wright (Democratic) 37.71%; ▌Appleton Howe (Liberty) 5.18%
Massachusetts 9	Henry Williams	Democratic	1836	Incumbent lost re-election. New member elected on the ninth ballot. Whig gain.	First ballot (November 11, 1844): ▌Henry Williams (Democratic) 44.52%; ▌Artemas Hale (Whig) 45.78%; ▌Laban M. Wheaton (Liberty) 8.55%; ▌Job Terry (Know Nothing) 1.15%; Second ballot (December 23, 1844): ▌Artemas Hale (Whig) 46.55%; ▌Henry Williams (Democratic) 46.18%; ▌Caleb Swan (Liberty) 7.27%; Third ballot (February 10, 1845): ▌Henry Williams (Democratic) 46.60%; ▌Artemas Hale (Whig) 46.21%; ▌Caleb Swan (Liberty) 7.19%; Fourth ballot (April 28, 1845): ▌Henry Williams (Democratic) 47.13%; ▌Artemas Hale (Whig) 43.66%; ▌Caleb Swan (Liberty) 7.93%; ▌Job Terry (Know Nothing) 1.28%; Fifth ballot (September 1, 1845): ▌Artemas Hale (Whig) 44.48%; ▌Henry Williams (Democratic) 43.43%; ▌Laban M. Wheaton (Liberty) 9.40%; ▌Job Terry (Know Nothing) 2.69%; Sixth ballot (November 10, 1845): ▌Peter H. Pierce (Democratic) 44.17%; ▌Artemas Hale (Whig) 42.90%; ▌Laban M. Wheaton (Liberty) 9.32%; ▌Job Terry (Know Nothing) 3.62%; Seventh ballot (December 29, 1845): ▌Artemas Hale (Whig) 45.40%; ▌Peter H. Pierce (Democratic) 44.45%; ▌Laban M. Wheaton (Liberty) 8.66%; ▌Job Terry (Know Nothing) 1.49%; Eighth ballot (February 2, 1846): ▌Artemas Hale (Whig) 44.39%; ▌Peter H. Pierce (Democratic) 47.31%; ▌Laban M. Wheaton (Liberty) 7.43%; Ninth ballot (November 9, 1846): ▌ ✓ Artemas Hale (Whig) 50.64%; ▌Foster Hooper (Democratic) 37.34%; ▌Laban M. Wheaton (Liberty) 10.35%; ▌Job Terry (Know Nothing) 1.67%
Massachusetts 10

== Michigan ==
Elections were held on November 5, 1844.

District	Incumbent			This race	
District	Member	Party	First elected	Results	Candidates
Michigan 1	Robert McClelland	Democratic	1843	Incumbent re-elected.	▌ ✓ Robert McClelland (Democratic) 51.2%; ▌Edwin Lawrence (Whig) 43.9%; ▌Charles H. Stewart (Liberty) 4.9%
Michigan 2	Lucius Lyon	Democratic	1843	Incumbent retired. Democratic hold.	▌ ✓ John S. Chipman (Democratic) 48.0%; ▌Henry W. Taylor (Whig) 45.7%; ▌Edwin A. Atlee (Liberty) 6.3%
Michigan 3	James B. Hunt	Democratic	1843	Incumbent re-elected.	▌ ✓ James B. Hunt (Democratic) 51.3%; ▌George W. Wisner (Whig) 42.9%; ▌William Caulfield (Liberty) 5.8%

== Mississippi ==
Elections were held on November 3–4, 1845, after the March 4, 1845 beginning of the term, but before the House first convened in December 1845.

District	Incumbent			This race	
District	Member	Party	First elected	Results	Candidates
Mississippi at-large (4 seats)	Jacob Thompson	Democratic	1839	Incumbent re-elected.	▌ ✓ Jacob Thompson (Democratic) 16.81%; ▌ ✓ Jefferson Davis (Democratic) 16.63%; ▌ ✓ Stephen Adams (Democratic) 16.42%; ▌ ✓ Robert W. Roberts (Democratic) 16.17%; ▌Patrick W. Tompkins (Whig) 11.05%; ▌Peter B. Starke (Whig) 10.64%; ▌Walker Brooke (Whig) 10.40%; Scattering 1.89%
Mississippi at-large (4 seats)	William H. Hammett	Democratic	1843	Incumbent retired. Democratic hold.	▌ ✓ Jacob Thompson (Democratic) 16.81%; ▌ ✓ Jefferson Davis (Democratic) 16.63%; ▌ ✓ Stephen Adams (Democratic) 16.42%; ▌ ✓ Robert W. Roberts (Democratic) 16.17%; ▌Patrick W. Tompkins (Whig) 11.05%; ▌Peter B. Starke (Whig) 10.64%; ▌Walker Brooke (Whig) 10.40%; Scattering 1.89%
Mississippi at-large (4 seats)	Robert W. Roberts	Democratic	1843	Incumbent re-elected.	▌ ✓ Jacob Thompson (Democratic) 16.81%; ▌ ✓ Jefferson Davis (Democratic) 16.63%; ▌ ✓ Stephen Adams (Democratic) 16.42%; ▌ ✓ Robert W. Roberts (Democratic) 16.17%; ▌Patrick W. Tompkins (Whig) 11.05%; ▌Peter B. Starke (Whig) 10.64%; ▌Walker Brooke (Whig) 10.40%; Scattering 1.89%
Mississippi at-large (4 seats)	Tilghman Tucker	Democratic	1843	Incumbent retired. Democratic hold.	▌ ✓ Jacob Thompson (Democratic) 16.81%; ▌ ✓ Jefferson Davis (Democratic) 16.63%; ▌ ✓ Stephen Adams (Democratic) 16.42%; ▌ ✓ Robert W. Roberts (Democratic) 16.17%; ▌Patrick W. Tompkins (Whig) 11.05%; ▌Peter B. Starke (Whig) 10.64%; ▌Walker Brooke (Whig) 10.40%; Scattering 1.89%

== Missouri ==
Elections were held at-large on a general ticket on August 5, 1844.

District	Incumbent			This race	
District	Member	Party	First elected	Results	Candidates
Missouri at-large 5 seats					(elected on a general ticket): ▌ ✓ John S. Phelps (Democratic) 12.02%; ▌ ✓ James B. Bowlin (Democratic) 11.84%; ▌ ✓ James H. Relfe (Democratic) 11.84%; ▌ ✓ Sterling Price (Democratic) 11.72%; ▌ ✓ Leonard H. Sims (Democratic) 9.43%; ▌Thomas B. Hudson (Whig) 9.43%; ▌John Thornton (Whig) 9.24%; ▌Ratliff Boon (Whig) 9.10%; ▌Augustus Jones (Whig) 9.09%; ▌D. C. Parsons (Democratic) 6.29%

== New Hampshire ==
Elections were held at-large on a general ticket on March 11, 1845, after the March 4, 1845 beginning of the term, but before the House first convened in December 1845.

District	Incumbent			This race	
District	Member	Party	First elected	Results	Candidates
New Hampshire at-large 4 seats	Edmund Burke	Democratic	1839	Incumbent retired. Democratic hold.	(elected on a general ticket); First ballot (March 11, 1845): ▌ ✓ Mace Moulton (Democratic) 13.53%; ▌ ✓ James Hutchins Johnson (Democratic) 13.49%; ▌ ✓ Moses Norris Jr. (Democratic) 13.19%; ▌John Woodbury (Democratic) 12.12%; ▌Thomas M. Edwards (Whig) 8.25%; ▌George W. Nesmith (Whig) 8.24%; ▌Ichabod Goodwin (Whig) 8.17%; ▌Joseph Sawyer (Whig) 7.63%; ▌John P. Hale (Independent) 4.23%; ▌Reuben Porter (Liberty) 2.86%; ▌Humphrey Moore (Liberty) 2.73%; ▌Joseph Cilley (Liberty) 2.62%; ▌Jacob Perkins (Liberty) 2.37%; Second ballot (August 23, 1845): ▌John Woodbury (Democratic) 48.42%; ▌Ichabod Goodwin (Whig) 28.18%; ▌John P. Hale (Independent) 23.39%; Third ballot (November 29, 1845): ▌John Woodbury (Democratic) 47.57%; ▌Ichabod Goodwin (Whig) 29.11%; ▌John P. Hale (Independent) 23.33%; Fourth ballot (March 10, 1846): ▌John Woodbury (Democratic) 48.82%; ▌Ichabod Goodwin (Whig) 30.28%; ▌John P. Hale (Independent) 20.90%
New Hampshire at-large 4 seats	John R. Reding	Democratic	1841	Incumbent retired. Democratic hold.	
New Hampshire at-large 4 seats	Moses Norris Jr.	Democratic	1843	Incumbent re-elected.	
New Hampshire at-large 4 seats	John P. Hale	Democratic	1843	No candidate elected on the fourth ballot; seat vacant. Democratic loss.	

== New Jersey ==
Elections were held on October 9, 1844.

District	Incumbent			This race	
District	Member	Party	First elected	Results	Candidates
New Jersey 1
New Jersey 2
New Jersey 3
New Jersey 4
New Jersey 5

== New York ==
Elections were held on November 11, 1844.

District	Incumbent			This race	
District	Member	Party	First elected	Results	Candidates
New York 1
New York 2
New York 3
New York 4
New York 5
New York 6
New York 7
New York 8
New York 9
New York 10
New York 11
New York 12
New York 13
New York 14
New York 15
New York 16
New York 17
New York 18
New York 19
New York 20
New York 21
New York 22
New York 23
New York 24
New York 25
New York 26
New York 27
New York 28
New York 29
New York 30
New York 31
New York 32
New York 33
New York 34

== North Carolina ==
Elections were held on August 7, 1845, after the March 4, 1845 beginning of the term, but before the House first convened in December 1845.

District	Incumbent			This race	
District	Member	Party	First elected	Results	Candidates
North Carolina 1
North Carolina 2
North Carolina 3
North Carolina 4
North Carolina 5
North Carolina 6
North Carolina 7
North Carolina 8
North Carolina 9

== Ohio ==
Elections were held on October 8, 1844.

District	Incumbent			This race	
District	Member	Party	First elected	Results	Candidates
Ohio 1
Ohio 2
Ohio 3
Ohio 4
Ohio 5
Ohio 6
Ohio 7
Ohio 8
Ohio 9
Ohio 10
Ohio 11
Ohio 12
Ohio 13
Ohio 14
Ohio 15
Ohio 16
Ohio 17
Ohio 18
Ohio 19
Ohio 20
Ohio 21

== Pennsylvania ==
Elections were held on October 8, 1844.

District	Incumbent			This race	
District	Member	Party	First elected	Results	Candidates
Pennsylvania 1	Edward Joy Morris	Whig	1842	Incumbent lost re-election. American Party gain.	▌ ✓ Lewis C. Levin (American) 43.42%; ▌George F. Lehman (Democratic) 31.34%; ▌Edward J. Morris (Whig) 25.23%
Pennsylvania 2	Joseph R. Ingersoll	Whig	1841	Incumbent re-elected.	▌ ✓ Joseph R. Ingersoll (Whig) 44.61%; ▌Horn R. Kneass (Democratic) 29.37%; ▌Samuel Ashmead (American) 26.02%
Pennsylvania 3	John T. Smith	Democratic	1842	Incumbent lost re-election. American Party gain.	▌ ✓ John Hull Campbell (American) 52.1%; ▌John T. Smith (Democratic) 40.49%; ▌Thomas C. Steel (Whig) 7.41%
Pennsylvania 4	Charles J. Ingersoll	Democratic	1842	Incumbent re-elected.	▌ ✓ Charles J. Ingersoll (Democratic) 42.93%; ▌Jacob Shearer (American) 41.15%; ▌Thomas C. Duffield, Sr. (Whig) 15.92%
Pennsylvania 5
Pennsylvania 6
Pennsylvania 7
Pennsylvania 8
Pennsylvania 9
Pennsylvania 10
Pennsylvania 11
Pennsylvania 12
Pennsylvania 13
Pennsylvania 14
Pennsylvania 15
Pennsylvania 16
Pennsylvania 17
Pennsylvania 18
Pennsylvania 19
Pennsylvania 20
Pennsylvania 21
Pennsylvania 22
Pennsylvania 23
Pennsylvania 24

== Rhode Island ==
Elections were held on April 2, 1845, after the March 4, 1845 beginning of the term, but before the House first convened in December 1845.

District	Incumbent			This race	
District	Member	Party	First elected	Results	Candidates
Rhode Island 1
Rhode Island 2

== South Carolina ==
Elections were held on October 14–15, 1844.

District	Incumbent			This race	
District	Member	Party	First elected	Results	Candidates
South Carolina 1
South Carolina 2
South Carolina 3
South Carolina 4
South Carolina 5
South Carolina 6
South Carolina 7

== Tennessee ==
Elections were held on August 7, 1845.

District	Incumbent			This race	
District	Member	Party	First elected	Results	Candidates
Tennessee 1	Andrew Johnson	Democratic	1842	Incumbent re-elected.	▌ ✓ Andrew Johnson (Democratic) 56.27%; ▌William B. Brownlow (Whig) 43.73%
Tennessee 2	William T. Senter	Whig	1842	Incumbent retired. Whig hold.	▌ ✓ William M. Cocke (Whig) 45.03%; ▌George S. Gilbert (Democratic) 35.63%; ▌Lewis Reneau (Independent Whig) 19.34%
Tennessee 3	Julius W. Blackwell	Democratic	1842	Incumbent lost re-election. Whig gain.	▌ ✓ John H. Crozier (Whig) 51.41%; ▌Julius W. Blackwell (Democratic) 48.59%
Tennessee 4	Alvan Cullom	Democratic	1842	Incumbent re-elected.	▌ ✓ Alvan Cullom (Democratic) 93.06%; ▌Isaac Clendenon (unknown) 6.94%
Tennessee 5	George W. Jones	Democratic	1842	Incumbent re-elected.	▌ ✓ George W. Jones (Democratic) 100%
Tennessee 6	Aaron V. Brown	Democratic	1839	Incumbent retired to run for Governor. Democratic hold.	▌ ✓ Barclay Martin (Democratic) 57.93%; ▌William D. Kindrick (Whig) 42.07%
Tennessee 7	David W. Dickinson	Whig	1842	Incumbent retired. Whig hold.	▌ ✓ Meredith P. Gentry (Whig) 67.94%; ▌Charles L. Nelson (Democratic) 32.06%
Tennessee 8	Joseph H. Peyton	Whig	1842	Incumbent re-elected.	▌ ✓ Joseph H. Peyton (Whig) 55.33%; ▌William Trousdale (Democratic) 44.67%
Tennessee 9	Cave Johnson	Democratic	1839	Incumbent retired. Democratic hold.	▌ ✓ Lucien B. Chase (Democratic) 57.56%; ▌John J. Mathewson (Whig) 42.44%
Tennessee 10	John B. Ashe	Whig	1842	Incumbent retired. Democratic gain.	▌ ✓ Frederick P. Stanton (Democratic) 52.76%; ▌Phineas T. Scruggs (Whig) 47.24%
Tennessee 11	Milton Brown	Whig	1841	Incumbent re-elected.	▌ ✓ Milton Brown (Whig) 60.96%; ▌Nelson Hess (Democratic) 39.04%

== Vermont ==
Elections were held on September 3, 1844.

District	Incumbent			This race	
District	Member	Party	First elected	Results	Candidates
Vermont 1	Solomon Foot	Whig	1843	Incumbent re-elected.	▌ ✓ Solomon Foot (Whig) 56.7%; ▌Charles K. Field (Democratic) 34.5%; ▌Oscar L. Shafter (Liberty) 8.2%
Vermont 2	Jacob Collamer	Whig	1843	Incumbent re-elected.	▌ ✓ Jacob Collamer (Whig) 54.6%; ▌Levi B. Vilas (Democratic) 34.8%; ▌Titus Hutchinson (Liberty) 9.7%
Vermont 3	George P. Marsh	Whig	1843	Incumbent re-elected.	▌ ✓ George P. Marsh (Whig) 56.7%; ▌John Smith (Democratic) 31.6%; ▌William H. French (unknown) 11.5%
Vermont 4	Paul Dillingham	Democratic	1843	Incumbent re-elected.	First ballot: ▌Paul Dillingham (Democratic) 48.0%; ▌George B. Chandler (Whig) 41.3%; ▌George Putnam (unknown) 10.4%; Second ballot: ▌Paul Dillingham (Democratic) 47.7%; ▌George B. Chandler (Whig) 44.0%; ▌George Putnam (Liberty) 8.3%; Third ballot: ▌ ✓ Paul Dillingham (Democratic) 51.4%; ▌George B. Chandler (Whig) 43.6%; ▌George Putnam (Liberty) 5.0%

== Virginia ==
Elections were held on April 24, 1845, after the March 4, 1845 beginning of the term, but before the House first convened in December 1845.

District	Incumbent			This race	
District	Member	Party	First elected	Results	Candidates
Virginia 1	Archibald Atkinson	Democratic	1843	Incumbent re-elected.	▌ ✓ Archibald Atkinson (Democratic) 55.9%; ▌R. H. Whitfield (Whig) 44.1%
Virginia 2	George Dromgoole	Democratic	1843	Incumbent re-elected.	▌ ✓ George Dromgoole (Democratic) 57.0%; ▌George W. Bolling (Whig) 43.0%
Virginia 3	Walter Coles	Democratic	1835	Incumbent retired. Democratic hold.	▌ ✓ William Tredway (Democratic) 51.3%; ▌[FNU] Gilmer (Whig) 48.7%
Virginia 4	Edmund W. Hubard	Democratic	1841	Incumbent re-elected.	▌ ✓ Edmund W. Hubard (Democratic); ▌John J. Hill (Whig)
Virginia 5	William L. Goggin	Whig	1839; 1843 (lost); 1844 (special)	Incumbent retired. Democratic gain.	▌ ✓ Shelton Leake (Democratic) 52.6%; ▌[FNU] Irving (Whig) 47.4%
Virginia 6	John Winston Jones	Democratic	1835	Incumbent retired. Democratic hold.	▌ ✓ James Seddon (Democratic) 52.3%; ▌John Botts (Whig) 47.7%
Virginia 7	Thomas H. Bayly	Democratic	1844 (special)	Incumbent re-elected.	▌ ✓ Thomas H. Bayly (Democratic) 53.5%; ▌George W. Southall (Whig) 46.5%
Virginia 8	Willoughby Newton	Whig	1843	Incumbent lost re-election. Democratic gain.	▌ ✓ Robert M. T. Hunter (Democratic) 55.3%; ▌Willoughby Newton (Whig) 44.7%
Virginia 9	Samuel Chilton	Whig	1843	Incumbent retired. Whig hold.	▌ ✓ John Pendleton (Whig) 53.2%; ▌[FNU] McCarty (Independent) 46.8%
Virginia 10	William Lucas	Democratic	1843	Incumbent lost re-election. Democratic hold.	▌ ✓ Henry Bedinger (Democratic) 55.0%; ▌William Lucas (Democratic) 45.0%
Virginia 11	William Taylor	Democratic	1843	Incumbent re-elected.	▌ ✓ William Taylor (Democratic) 100%
Virginia 12	Augustus A. Chapman	Democratic	1843	Incumbent re-elected.	▌ ✓ Augustus A. Chapman (Democratic) 61.2%; ▌Fleming B. Miller (Democratic) 38.8%
Virginia 13	George W. Hopkins	Democratic	1835	Incumbent re-elected.	▌ ✓ George W. Hopkins (Democratic) 50.2%; ▌John B. George (Whig) 49.8%
Virginia 14	George W. Summers	Whig	1841	Incumbent lost renomination. Democratic gain.	▌ ✓ Joseph Johnson (Democratic) 52.6%; ▌George D. Camden (Whig) 47.4%
Virginia 15	Lewis Steenrod	Democratic	1839	Incumbent retired. Democratic hold.	▌ ✓ William G. Brown Sr. (Democratic) 56.3%; ▌Guy C. R. Allen (Whig) 43.7%

== Wisconsin Territory ==
See Non-voting delegates, below.

== Non-voting delegates ==
District	Incumbent			This race	
District	Delegate	Party	First elected	Results	Candidates
Iowa Territory at-large	Augustus C. Dodge	Democratic	1840	Incumbent re-elected.	▌ ✓ Augustus C. Dodge (Democratic); [data missing]
Wisconsin Territory at-large	Henry Dodge	Democratic	1840	Incumbent retired to become territorial governor of Wisconsin. New delegate elected on an unknown date. Democratic hold.	▌ ✓ Morgan L. Martin (Democratic); [data missing]

== See also ==
- 1844 United States elections
  - List of United States House of Representatives elections (1824–1854)
  - 1844 United States presidential election
  - 1844–45 United States Senate elections
- 28th United States Congress
- 29th United States Congress

== Bibliography ==
- Dubin, Michael J. (March 1, 1998). United States Congressional Elections, 1788-1997: The Official Results of the Elections of the 1st Through 105th Congresses. McFarland and Company. ISBN 978-0786402830.
- Martis, Kenneth C. (January 1, 1989). The Historical Atlas of Political Parties in the United States Congress, 1789-1989. Macmillan Publishing Company. ISBN 978-0029201701.
- Moore, John L., ed. (1994). Congressional Quarterly's Guide to U.S. Elections (Third ed.). Congressional Quarterly Inc. ISBN 978-0871879967.
- "Party Divisions of the House of Representatives* 1789–Present". Office of the Historian, House of United States House of Representatives.
