= 1842–43 United States House of Representatives elections =

House elections for the 28th U.S. Congress

- August 1, 1842 – November 8, 1843 (Note: Elections in Maryland were held so late that they ran into 1844, as was at least one run-off election in Massachusetts, this article only includes elections during 1842 and 1843.)

All 223 seats in the United States House of Representatives 112 seats needed for a majority
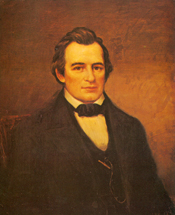

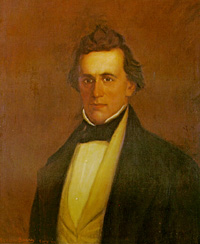
	Majority party	Minority party
Leader	John Jones	John White
Party	Democratic	Whig
Leader's seat	Virginia 6th	Kentucky 6th
Last election	98 seats	142 seats
Seats won	147 (Note: Includes 4 elected as "Redemption" Democrats.)	72
Seat change	▲49	▼70
Popular vote	1,068,415	907,404
Percentage	52.04%	44.20%
Swing	▲4.40 pp	▼7.18 pp
	Third party	Fourth party
Party	Law and Order	Independent
Last election	Pre-creation	2 seats (Note: Included 1 Independent Democrat.)
Seats won	2	2 (Note: Includes 1 Independent and 1 Independent Whig.)
Seat change	▲2	Steady
Popular vote	7,145	27,413
Percentage	0.35%	1.34%
Swing	New party	▲0.86 pp
- Results: Democratic hold Democratic gain Whig hold Whig gain Law and Order gain
Speaker before election
John White
Whig
Elected Speaker
John Jones
Democratic

The 1842–43 United States House of Representatives elections were held on various dates in various states between August 1, 1842, and November 8, 1843. Each state set its own date for its elections to the House of Representatives before the first session of the 28th United States Congress convened on December 4, 1843. The exception was Maryland, which held theirs so late that they ran into February 1844. These elections occurred during President John Tyler's term. The congressional reapportionment based on the 1840 United States census unusually decreased the number of House seats, from 242 down to 223.

After Whig President William Henry Harrison died within a month of taking office, his successor as president, John Tyler was only nominally a Whig who had not been properly validated for alignment to Whig policy. Effectively an independent, Tyler was disliked by politicians and was unpopular with voters of both parties, leaving the Whigs unexpectedly leaderless and in visible disarray.

Despite the improving economy, rural voters favored Democrats, again rejecting Whig economic nationalism. The Whig Party lost 69 seats and their sizeable majority from the 1840 election, almost half their House delegation (one of the Whigs who won re-election was William Wright of New Jersey, elected as an "Independent Whig").

The Democrats won a majority, flipping 48 Whig seats (this includes Henry Nes of Pennsylvania, elected as an Independent Democrat (Note: Dubin lists Nes as an "Independent" rather than as an Independent Democrat.)). In Rhode Island, the Law and Order Party, formed in response to the Dorr Rebellion, won both of Rhode Island's two seats.

== Apportionment Act of 1842 ==
Apportionment was based on the census of 1840 and was unusual in that the number of House seats was decreased, from 242 to 223: this came after the Apportionment Act of 1842 mandated that all members be elected from single-member contiguous districts, thus abolishing plural districts and at-large districts. Four states that did not comply with this new law delayed redistricting under a grandfather clause.

== Election summaries ==
↓
148	2	73
Democratic	(Note: The Law and Order Party had 2 members)	Whig

State	Type	Date	Total seats		Democratic		Whig		Law and Order	
State	Type	Date	Seats	Change	Seats	Change	Seats	Change	Seats	Change
Missouri	At-large	August 1, 1842	5	▲3	5	▲3	0	Steady	0	Steady
Tennessee	District	August 3, 1842	11	▼2	6	▲1	5	▼3	0	Steady
Illinois	District	August 7, 1842	7	▲4	6	▲4	1	Steady	0	Steady
Arkansas	At-large	October 3, 1842	1	Steady	1	Steady	0	Steady	0	Steady
Georgia	At-large	October 3, 1842	8	▼1	8	▲8	0	▼9	0	Steady
New Jersey	District (Note: Changed from at-large)	October 8, 1842	5	▼1	4	▲4	1 (Note: Includes 1 Independent Whig: William Wright who was elected in New Jersey's 5th congressional district.)	▼5	0	Steady
Delaware	At-large	November 8, 1842	1	Steady	0	Steady	1	Steady	0	Steady
New York	District	November 8, 1842	34	▼6	24	▲4	10	▼10	0	Steady
Massachusetts	District	November 14, 1842 (Note: Run-off ballots in Massachusetts ran into 1843 and 1844 in some districts.)	10	▼2	2	▲1	8	▼3	0	Steady
South Carolina	District	February 20–21, 1843	7	▼2	7	▼1	0	▼1	0	Steady
New Hampshire	At-large	March 3, 1843	4	▼1	4	▼1	0	Steady	0	Steady
Late elections after the March 4, 1843 beginning of the term
Connecticut	District	April 5, 1843	4	▼2	4	▲4	0	▼6	0	Steady
Virginia	District	April 27, 1843	15	▼6	12	▲2	3	▼8	0	Steady
Louisiana	District	July 3–5, 1843	4	▲1	4	▲3	0	▼2	0	Steady
North Carolina	District	August 3, 1843	9	▼4	5	Steady	4	▼4	0	Steady
Alabama	District	August 7, 1843	7	▲2	6	▲1	1	▲1	0	Steady
Indiana	District	August 7, 1843	10	▲3	8	▲7	2	▼4	0	Steady
Kentucky	District	August 7, 1843	10	▼3	5	▲3	5	▼6	0	Steady
Rhode Island	District	August 29, 1843	2	Steady	0	Steady	0	▼2	2	▲2
Vermont	District	September 5, 1843	4	▼1	1	▲1	3	▼2	0	Steady
Maine	District	September 11, 1843	7	▼1	5	▲1	2	▼2	0	Steady
Ohio	District	October 10, 1843	21	▲2	12	▲5	9	▼3	0	Steady
Pennsylvania	District	October 10, 1843	24	▼4	12 (Note: Includes 1 Independent Democrat: Henry Nes who was elected in Pennsylvania's 15th congressional district.)	▼3	12	▼1	0	Steady
Mississippi	At-large	November 6–7, 1843	4	▲2	4	▲2	0	Steady	0	Steady
Michigan	District	November 8, 1843	3	▲2	3	▲3	0	▼1	0	Steady
Maryland	District	February 14, 1844	6	▼2	0	▼2	6	Steady	0	Steady
Total			223	▼19	148 66.4%	▲50	73 32.7%	▼71	2 0.9%	▲2

Popular vote
Democratic	51.27%
Whig	44.17%
Law & Order	0.35%
Independent	2.06%
Others	2.15%

House seats
Democratic	65.47%
Whig	32.74%
Law & Order	0.90%
Independent	0.90%

== Special elections ==
=== 27th Congress ===
District	Incumbent			This race	
District	Member	Party	First elected	Results	Candidates
Pennsylvania 17	Davis Dimock Jr.	Democratic	1840	Incumbent died January 13, 1842. New member elected March 1, 1842. Democratic hold.	▌ ✓ Almon H. Read (Democratic) 60.1%; ▌Joseph Kingsbury (Whig) 34.8%; ▌Orio J. Hamlin (Democratic) 2.9%; ▌George F. Horton (Liberty) 2.2%
North Carolina 13	Lewis Willams	Whig	1815	Incumbent died February 23, 1842. New member elected April 14, 1842. Whig hold.	▌ ✓ Anderson Mitchell (Whig); [data missing]
Ohio 16	Joshua R. Giddings	Whig	1838 (special)	Incumbent resigned March 22, 1842, after being censured for violating the gag rule. Incumbent re-elected April 26, 1842.	▌ ✓ Joshua R. Giddings (Whig) 65.5%; ▌John M. Edwards (Democratic) 34.5%
Pennsylvania 21	Joseph Lawrence	Whig	1824; 1828 (lost); 1840	Incumbent died April 17, 1842. New member elected May 20, 1842. Whig hold.	▌ ✓ Thomas M. T. McKennan (Whig) 51.9%; ▌William Patterson (Democratic) 48.1%
Massachusetts 1	Robert C. Winthrop	Whig	1840 (special)	Incumbent resigned May 25, 1842, due to the death of his wife. New member elected June 3, 1842. Whig hold. Winner would later resign and be replaced by his predecessor; see below.	▌ ✓ Nathan Appleton (Whig) 67.1%; ▌William Washburn (Democratic) 30.1%; ▌Amos Merrill (Liberty) 2.8%
Massachusetts 9	William S. Hastings	Whig	1836	Incumbent died June 17, 1842. No member elected due to failure to achieve majority vote. Whig loss.	First ballot (July 18, 1842): ▌Ezra W. Wilkinson (Democratic) 43.1%; ▌Samuel G. Goodrich (Whig) 42.5%; ▌William Jackson (Liberty) 14.4%; Second ballot (November 14, 1842): ▌William Jackson (Whig) 49.8%; ▌Ezra W. Wilkinson (Democratic) 48.4%; Scattering 1.8%; Third ballot (December 19, 1842): ▌William Jackson (Whig) 48.9%; ▌Ezra W. Wilkinson (Democratic) 48.8%; ▌Theodore Lyman II (Unknown) 2.3%
South Carolina 4	Sampson H. Butler	Democratic	1839 (special)	Incumbent resigned September 27, 1842. New member elected November 7–8, 1842. Democratic hold.	▌ ✓ Samuel W. Trotti (Democratic); ▌C. R. Carroll (Unknown); [data missing]
Massachusetts 1	Nathan Appleton	Whig	1830; 1833 (retired); 1842 (special)	Incumbent resigned September 28, 1842. New member elected November 14, 1842. Whig hold. Winner also elected to the next term; see below.	▌ ✓ Robert C. Winthrop (Whig) 54.5%; ▌William Washburn (Democratic) 42.1%; ▌Dexter S. King (Liberty) 3.4%
Georgia at-large (One of the at-large seats)	Richard W. Habersham	Whig	1838	Incumbent died December 2, 1842. New member elected January 2, 1843. Whig hold.	▌ ✓ George W. Crawford (Whig) 55.2%; ▌Alexander McDougald (Democratic) 44.8%
Massachusetts 3	James W. Williams	Democratic	1841	Incumbent died December 2, 1842. New member elected January 2, 1843. Democratic hold.	▌ ✓ Charles S. Sewall (Democratic) 72.7%; ▌[FNU] Rutledge (Unknown) 21.5%; ▌[FNU] Preston (Unknown) 4.7%; ▌[FNU] Widner (Unknown) 1.1%

=== 28th Congress ===
District	Incumbent			This race	
District	Member	Party	First elected	Results	Candidates
Georgia at-large Two of the at-large seats	Mark A. Cooper	Democratic	1838; 1840 (lost); 1841 (special	Incumbent resigned June 26, 1843, to unsuccessfully run for Governor of Georgia. New member elected October 2, 1843. Whig gain.	▌ ✓ Alexander H. Stephens (Whig) 26.4%; ▌ ✓ Absalom H. Chappell (Whig) 25.7%; ▌James H. Stark (Democratic) 24.0%; ▌Herschel V. Johnson (Democratic) 23.9%
Georgia at-large Two of the at-large seats	John B. Lamar	Democratic	1842	Incumbent resigned July 29, 1843. New member elected October 2, 1843. Whig gain.	▌ ✓ Alexander H. Stephens (Whig) 26.4%; ▌ ✓ Absalom H. Chappell (Whig) 25.7%; ▌James H. Stark (Democratic) 24.0%; ▌Herschel V. Johnson (Democratic) 23.9%
Massachusetts 10	Barker Burnell	Whig	1840	Incumbent died June 15, 1843. New member elected November 13, 1843. Whig hold.	▌ ✓ Joseph Grinnell (Whig) 53.5%; ▌Sampson Perkins (Democratic) 42.5%; ▌Caleb Belcher (Liberty) 4.0%

== Alabama ==
Alabama gained 2 seats, going from 5 to 7 members. Elections were held August 7, 1843, after the March 4, 1843 beginning of the term. In the 1841 elections, Alabama briefly used at-large general-ticket elections, but in these elections it returned to districts.

District	Incumbent			This race	
District	Member	Party	First elected	Results	Candidates
Alabama 1	Benjamin Glover Shields; Redistricted from the at-large district	Democratic	1841	Incumbent retired. Whig gain.	▌ ✓ James Dellet (Whig) 50.7%; ▌Henry Goldthwaite (Democratic) 49.3%
Alabama 2	New seat			New seat. Democratic gain.	▌ ✓ James Edwin Belser (Democratic) 52.2%; ▌John Pettit (Whig) 47.9%
Alabama 3	Dixon Hall Lewis; Redistricted from the at-large district	Democratic	1829	Incumbent re-elected.	▌ ✓ Dixon Hall Lewis (Democratic) 52.3%; ▌Henry Charles Lea (Whig) 47.7%
Alabama 4	William Winter Payne; Redistricted from the at-large district	Democratic	1841	Incumbent re-elected.	▌ ✓ William Winter Payne (Democratic) 51.7%; ▌Elisha Young (Whig) 48.3%
Alabama 5	George S. Houston; Redistricted from the at-large district	Democratic	1841	Incumbent re-elected.	▌ ✓ George S. Houston (Democratic) 50.3%; ▌Francis Armstrong (Whig) 49.7%
Alabama 6	Reuben Chapman; Redistricted from the at-large district	Democratic	1835	Incumbent re-elected.	▌ ✓ Reuben Chapman (Democratic) 83.31%; Unknown 16.69%
Alabama 7	Open seat			New seat. Democratic gain.	▌ ✓ Felix Grundy McConnell (Democratic) 52.37%; ▌William Parish Chilton (Whig) 45.37%; ▌Samuel G. Daily (Unknown) 2.26%

== Arkansas ==
1842 Arkansas at-large election
- October 3, 1842

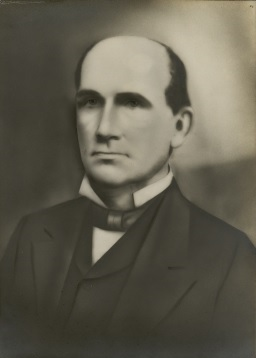
Nominee	Edward Cross	William Cummins	Lemuel D. Evans
Party	Democratic	Whig	Independent
Popular vote	9,413	5,315	1,686
Percentage	57.4%	32.4%	10.3%
- County Results; Cross: 40–50% 50–60% 60–70% 70–80% 80–90% >90% Cummins: 40–50% 50–60% 60–70% 70–80% Evans: 50–60% No Data
U.S. Representative before election
Edward Cross
Democratic
Elected U.S. Representative
Edward Cross
Democratic

Arkansas stayed at 1 seat, electing its one member at-large October 3, 1842.

District	Incumbent			This race	
District	Member	Party	First elected	Results	Candidates
Arkansas at-large	Edward Cross	Democratic	1838	Incumbent re-elected.	▌ ✓ Edward Cross (Democratic) 57.3%; ▌William Cummins (Whig) 32.4%; ▌Lemuel D. Evans (Independent) 10.3%

== Connecticut ==
Connecticut lost 2 seats, reduced from 6 to 4 members. Elections were held April 5, 1843, after the March 4, 1843 beginning of the term, but before the House first convened in December 1843.

District	Incumbent			This race	
District	Member	Party	First elected	Results	Candidates
Connecticut 1	Joseph Trumbull	Whig	1834 (special); 1835 (lost); 1839	Incumbent retired. Democratic gain.	▌ ✓ Thomas H. Seymour (Democratic) 49.1%; ▌Thomas K. Brace (Whig) 48.7%; ▌Edward Hooker (Liberty) 2.3%
Connecticut 1	John H. Brockway; Redistricted from the 6th district	Whig	1839	Incumbent retired. Whig loss.	▌ ✓ Thomas H. Seymour (Democratic) 49.1%; ▌Thomas K. Brace (Whig) 48.7%; ▌Edward Hooker (Liberty) 2.3%
Connecticut 2	William Boardman	Whig	1840 (special)	Incumbent retired. Democratic gain.	▌ ✓ John Stewart (Democratic) 48.9%; ▌Samuel D. Hubbard (Whig) 48.3%; ▌Ely Warner (Liberty) 2.8%
Connecticut 3	Thomas W. Williams	Whig	1839	Incumbent retired. Democratic gain.	▌ ✓ George S. Catlin (Democratic) 52.8%; ▌Edward Eldridge (Whig) 41.0%; ▌Increase Wilson (Liberty) 5.1%; ▌Samuel Bowen (Unknown) 1.1%
Connecticut 3	Truman Smith; Redistricted from the 5th district	Whig	1839	Incumbent retired. Whig loss.	▌ ✓ George S. Catlin (Democratic) 52.8%; ▌Edward Eldridge (Whig) 41.0%; ▌Increase Wilson (Liberty) 5.1%; ▌Samuel Bowen (Unknown) 1.1%
Connecticut 4	Thomas B. Osborne	Whig	1839	Incumbent lost re-election. Democratic gain.	▌ ✓ Samuel Simons (Democratic) 49.3%; ▌Thomas B. Osborne (Whig) 48.3%; ▌Daniel G. Platt (Liberty) 2.3%

== Delaware ==
1842 United States House of Representatives election in Delaware
- November 8, 1842
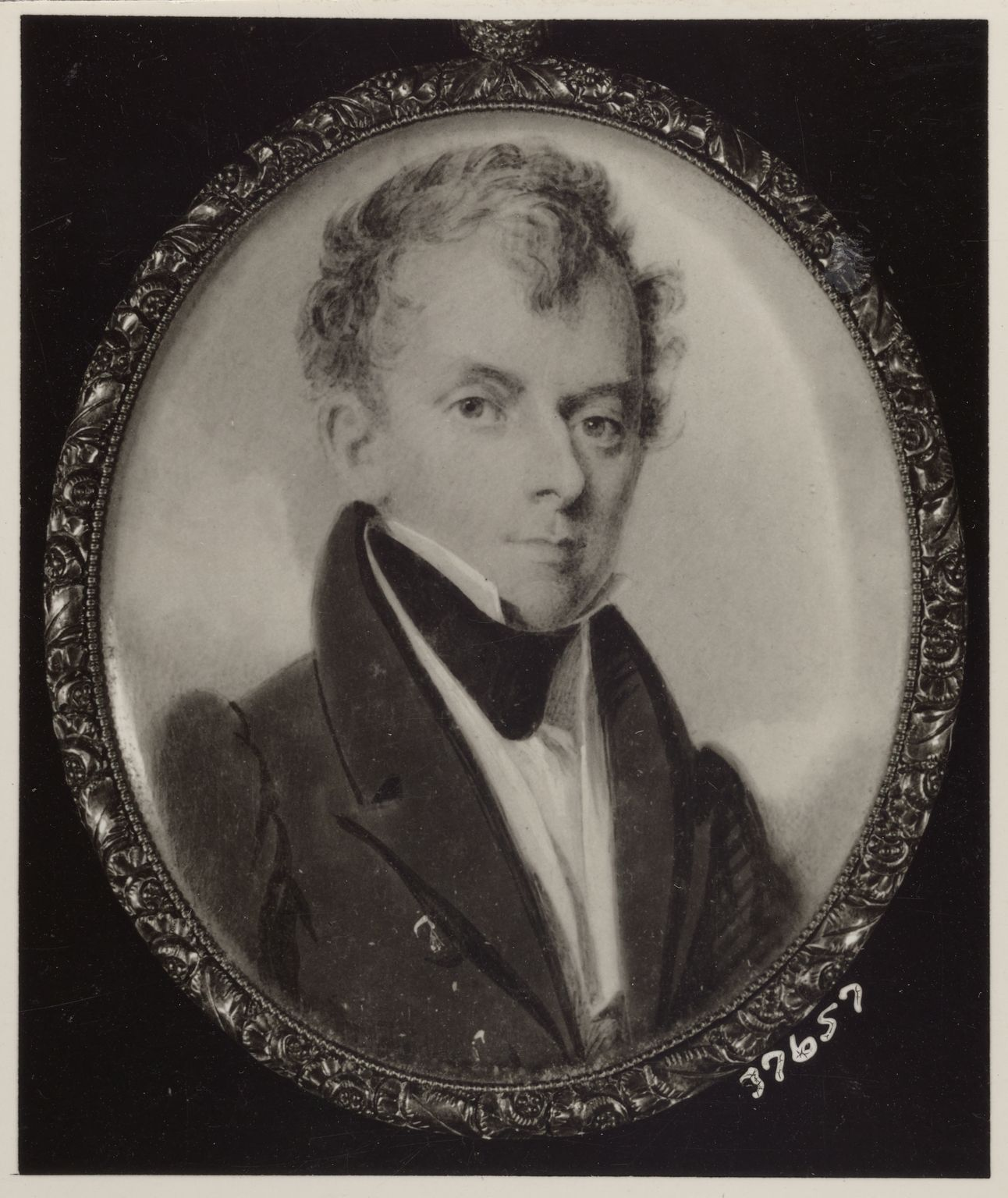

Nominee	George B. Rodney	William H. Jones
Party	Whig	Democratic
Popular vote	5,465	5,456
Percentage	50.04%	49.96%
- County results Rodney: 50–60% Jones: 50–60%
U.S. Representative before election
George B. Rodney
Whig
Elected U.S. Representative
George B. Rodney
Whig

Delaware stayed at 1 seat, electing its one member at-large November 8, 1842.

The election was decided by a nine-vote margin.

District	Incumbent			This race	
District	Member	Party	First elected	Results	Candidates
Delaware at-large	George B. Rodney	Whig	1840	Incumbent re-elected.	▌ ✓ George B. Rodney (Whig) 50.04%; ▌William H. Jones (Democratic) 49.96%

== Florida Territory ==
See Non-voting delegates, below.

== Georgia ==
Georgia lost 1 seat, going from 9 to 8 members. Elections were held at-large on a general ticket October 3, 1842.

District	Incumbent			This race	
District	Member	Party	First elected	Results	Candidates
Georgia at-large 8 at-large seats	Mark A. Cooper	Democratic	1841 (special)	Incumbent re-elected.	Elected on a general ticket: ▌ ✓ Mark A. Cooper (Democratic) 6.48%; ▌ ✓ John B. Lamar (Democratic) 6.45%; ▌ ✓ William H. Stiles (Democratic) 6.42%; ▌ ✓ Hugh A. Haralson (Democratic) 6.42%; ▌ ✓ Howell Cobb (Democratic) 6.41%; ▌ ✓ John Millen (Democratic) 6.39%; ▌ ✓ Edward J. Black (Democratic) 6.37%; ▌ ✓ John H. Lumpkin (Democratic) 6.37%; ▌Absalom H. Chappell (Whig) 6.50%; ▌Richard W. Habersham (Whig) 6.11%; ▌Augustus R. Wright (Whig) 6.07%; ▌Roger L. Gamble (Whig) 6.06%; ▌Richard H. Wilde (Whig) 6.03%; ▌Augustus Holmes Kenan (Whig) 6.00%; ▌T. Butler King (Whig) 5.99%; ▌Henry P. Smead (Whig) 5.94%
Georgia at-large 8 at-large seats	Thomas F. Foster	Whig	1828; 1834 (lost); 1840	Incumbent retired. Democratic gain.	
Georgia at-large 8 at-large seats	Thomas B. King	Whig	1838	Incumbent lost re-election. Democratic gain.	
Georgia at-large 8 at-large seats	Roger L. Gamble	Whig	1838	Incumbent lost re-election. Democratic gain.	
Georgia at-large 8 at-large seats	James A. Meriwether	Whig	1840	Incumbent retired. Democratic gain.	
Georgia at-large 8 at-large seats	Richard W. Habersham	Whig	1838	Incumbent lost re-election. Democratic gain. Incumbent died December 2, 1842, leading to a special election.	
Georgia at-large 8 at-large seats	Edward J. Black	Democratic	1838; 1840 (lost); 1841 (special)	Incumbent re-elected.	
Georgia at-large 8 at-large seats	Walter T. Colquitt	Democratic	1841 (special)	Incumbent retired. Democratic hold.	

== Illinois ==
Illinois gained 4 seats, going from 3 to 7 members. Elections were held August 7, 1842.

District	Incumbent			This race	
District	Member	Party	First elected	Results	Candidates
Illinois 1
Illinois 2
Illinois 3
Illinois 4
Illinois 5
Illinois 6
Illinois 7

== Indiana ==
Indiana gained 3 seats, going from 7 to 10 members. Elections were held August 7, 1843, after the March 4, 1843 beginning of the term.

District	Incumbent			This race	
District	Member	Party	First elected	Results	Candidates
Indiana 1
Indiana 2
Indiana 3
Indiana 4
Indiana 5
Indiana 6
Indiana 7
Indiana 8
Indiana 9
Indiana 10

== Kentucky ==
Kentucky lost 3 seats, going from 13 to 10 members. Elections were held August 7, 1843, after the March 4, 1843 beginning of the term.

District	Incumbent			This race	
District	Member	Party	First elected	Results	Candidates
Kentucky 1
Kentucky 2
Kentucky 3
Kentucky 4
Kentucky 5
Kentucky 6
Kentucky 7
Kentucky 8
Kentucky 9
Kentucky 10

== Louisiana ==
Louisiana gained 1 seats, going from 3 to 4 members. Elections were held July 3–5, 1843, after the March 4, 1843 beginning of the term.

District	Incumbent			This race	
District	Member	Party	First elected	Results	Candidates
Louisiana 1
Louisiana 2
Louisiana 3
Louisiana 4

== Maine ==
Maine lost 1 seat, going from 8 to 7 members. Elections were held September 11, 1843, after the March 4, 1843 beginning of the term.

District	Incumbent			This race	
District	Member	Party	First elected	Results	Candidates
Maine 1
Maine 2
Maine 3
Maine 4
Maine 5
Maine 6
Maine 7

== Maryland ==
Maryland lost 2 seats, going from 8 to 6 members. Elections were held February 14, 1844, after the March 4, 1843 beginning of the term.

Maryland's elections to the next Congress were held February 14, 1844, after the 1842–1843 election cycle was passed and almost after the next Congress completed.

== Massachusetts ==
Massachusetts lost 2 seats, going from 12 to 10 members. Elections were held November 14, 1842, but some districts' elections stretched to multiple ballots into 1843 and very early 1844.

District	Incumbent			This race	
District	Member	Party	First elected	Results	Candidates
Massachusetts 1	Nathan Appleton	Whig	1830; 1833 (retired); 1842 (special)	Incumbent resigned September 28, 1842. Whig hold. Successor also elected the same day to finish the current term; see above.	▌ ✓ Robert C. Winthrop (Whig) 54.33%; ▌William Washburn (Democratic) 42.03%; ▌Dexter S. King (Liberty) 3.65%
Massachusetts 2	Leverett Saltonstall I	Whig	1838	Incumbent lost re-election. New member elected on the fourth ballot. Whig hold.	First ballot (November 14, 1842): ▌Robert Rantoul Jr. (Democratic) 46.88%; ▌Leverett Saltonstall I (Whig) 42.76%; ▌William B. Dodge (Liberty) 7.28%; ▌David Pingree (Unknown) 3.09%; Second ballot (February 13, 1843): ▌Robert Rantoul Jr. (Democratic) 49.09%; ▌Leverett Saltonstall I (Whig) 39.11%; ▌David H. Barlow (Unknown) 7.33%; ▌David Pingree (Unknown) 2.99%; ▌Stephen Clarendon Phillips (Unknown) 1.49%; Third ballot (April 3, 1843): ▌Robert Rantoul Jr. (Democratic) 45.38%; ▌Daniel P. King (Whig) 43.97%; ▌Moses P. Hanson (Liberty) 7.56%; ▌David Pingree (Unknown) 3.10%; Fourth ballot (June 5, 1843): ▌ ✓ Daniel P. King (Whig) 51.36%; ▌Jeremiah C. Stickney (Democratic) 39.50%; ▌Moses P. Hanson (Liberty) 9.14%
Massachusetts 3	Caleb Cushing	Whig	1834	Incumbent retired. New member elected on the seventh ballot. Whig hold.	First ballot (November 14, 1842): ▌Joseph W. Mansur (Democratic) 48.68%; ▌John P. Robinson (Whig) 39.89%; ▌John Greenleaf Whittier (Liberty) 9.38%; ▌Caleb Cushing (Whig) 2.06%; Second ballot (February 13, 1843): ▌Joseph W. Mansur (Democratic) 45.74%; ▌Amos Abbott (Whig) 42.32%; ▌John Greenleaf Whittier (Liberty) 8.29%; ▌Caleb Cushing (Whig) 3.64%; Third ballot (April 3, 1843): ▌Joseph W. Mansur (Democratic) 42.76%; ▌Amos Abbott (Whig) 42.39%; ▌John Greenleaf Whittier (Liberty) 12.25%; ▌Caleb Cushing (Whig) 2.60%; Fourth ballot (June 5, 1843): ▌Amos Abbott (Whig) 43.82%; ▌Joseph W. Mansur (Democratic) 42.70%; ▌John Greenleaf Whittier (Liberty) 13.48%; Fifth ballot (November 13, 1843): ▌Amos Abbott (Whig) 45.19%; ▌Joseph W. Mansur (Democratic) 42.36%; ▌John Greenleaf Whittier (Liberty) 12.46%; Sixth ballot (January 1, 1844): ▌Amos Abbott (Whig) 48.63%; ▌Joseph W. Mansur (Democratic) 38.11%; ▌John Greenleaf Whittier (Liberty) 13.26%; Seventh ballot (January 29, 1844): ▌ ✓ Amos Abbott (Whig) 51.04%; ▌Gayton P. Osgood (Democratic) 39.77%; ▌Gardner B. Perry (Liberty) 9.19%
Massachusetts 4	William Parmenter	Democratic	1836	Incumbent re-elected on the second ballot.	First ballot (November 14, 1842): ▌William Parmenter (Democratic) 49.92%; ▌Samuel Hoar (Whig) 43.68%; ▌Thomas M. Ward (Liberty) 5.95%; Second ballot (February 13, 1843): ▌ ✓ William Parmenter (Democratic) 52.69%; ▌Samuel Hoar (Whig) 39.58%; ▌Thomas M. Ward (Liberty) 7.73%
Massachusetts 5	Charles Hudson	Whig	1841 (special)	Incumbent re-elected on the third ballot.	First ballot (November 14, 1842): ▌Charles Hudson (Whig) 48.41%; ▌Pliny Merrick (Democratic) 45.95%; ▌Phineas Crandall (Liberty) 5.64%; Second ballot (February 13, 1843): ▌Charles Hudson (Whig) 49.03%; ▌Pliny Merrick (Democratic) 44.48%; ▌Phineas Crandall (Liberty) 6.49%; Third ballot (April 3, 1843): ▌ ✓ Charles Hudson (Whig) 51.22%; ▌David Henshaw (Democratic) 41.81%; ▌Phineas Crandall (Liberty) 6.97%
Massachusetts 6	Osmyn Baker	Whig	1839 (special)	Incumbent re-elected on the sixth ballot.	First ballot (November 14, 1842): ▌Osmyn Baker (Whig) 49.02%; ▌Chester W. Chapin (Democratic) 45.71%; ▌Gardiner Dorance (Liberty) 5.27%; Second ballot (February 13, 1843): ▌Osmyn Baker (Whig) 48.19%; ▌Chester W. Chapin (Democratic) 45.57%; ▌Gardiner Dorance (Liberty) 6.24%; Third ballot (April 3, 1843): ▌Osmyn Baker (Whig) 47.18%; ▌Chester W. Chapin (Democratic) 45.18%; ▌Gardiner Dorance (Liberty) 7.64%; Fourth ballot (June 5, 1843): ▌Osmyn Baker (Whig) 47.85%; ▌Chester W. Chapin (Democratic) 45.16%; ▌Gardiner Dorance (Liberty) 6.99%; Fifth ballot (November 13, 1843): ▌Osmyn Baker (Whig) 49.57%; ▌Chester W. Chapin (Democratic) 43.95%; ▌Gardiner Dorance (Liberty) 6.48%; Sixth ballot (January 1, 1844): ▌ ✓ Osmyn Baker (Whig) 50.26%; ▌Chester W. Chapin (Democratic) 40.26%; ▌Gardiner Dorance (Liberty) 9.48%
Massachusetts 7	George N. Briggs	Whig	1833	Incumbent retired. New member elected on the sixth ballot. Whig hold.	First ballot (November 14, 1842): ▌Henry W. Bishop (Democratic) 47.05%; ▌Julius Rockwell (Whig) 45.65%; ▌Joel Hayden (Liberty) 4.68%; ▌Henry Shaw (Unknown) 2.62%; Second ballot (February 13, 1843): ▌Julius Rockwell (Whig) 45.20%; ▌Henry W. Bishop (Democratic) 43.31%; ▌Joel Hayden (Liberty) 4.20%; Scattering 6.71%; Third ballot (April 3, 1843): ▌Julius Rockwell (Whig) 49.11%; ▌Henry W. Bishop (Democratic) 46.04%; ▌Joel Hayden (Liberty) 4.86%; Fourth ballot (June 5, 1843): ▌Julius Rockwell (Whig) 47.49%; ▌Henry W. Bishop (Democratic) 37.66%; ▌Joel Hayden (Liberty) 6.03%; ▌John Banning (Unknown) 3.23%; ▌Ira Curtis (Unknown) 1.76%; ▌Russell Brown (Democratic) 1.03%; Scattering 2.02%; Fifth ballot (November 13, 1843): ▌Julius Rockwell (Whig) 49.15%; ▌Henry W. Bishop (Democratic) 44.78%; ▌Joel Hayden (Liberty) 6.07%; Sixth ballot (January 1, 1844): ▌ ✓ Julius Rockwell (Whig) 54.05%; ▌Henry W. Bishop (Democratic) 38.52%; ▌Joel Hayden (Liberty) 7.43%
Massachusetts 8	John Quincy Adams; Redistricted from the 12th district	Whig	1830	Incumbent re-elected.	▌ ✓ John Quincy Adams (Whig) 51.86%; ▌Ezra Wilkinson (Democratic) 46.86%; ▌William M. Jackson (Liberty) 1.27%
Massachusetts 9	Nathaniel B. Borden; Redistricted from the 10th district	Democratic	1834; 1838 (lost); 1841	Incumbent retired. Democratic hold.	▌ ✓ Henry Williams (Democratic) 55.32%; ▌Seth Sprague (Whig) 37.95%; ▌Hodges Read (Liberty) 6.73%
Massachusetts 10	Barker Burnell; Redistricted from the 11th district	Whig	1840	Incumbent re-elected.	▌ ✓ Barker Burnell (Whig) 52.12%; ▌John H. Shaw (Democratic) 44.36%; ▌Caleb Belcher (Liberty) 3.51%

== Michigan ==
Michigan gained 2 seats, going from 1 to 3 members. Elections were held from districts November 8, 1843, after the March 4, 1843 beginning of the term, having previously elected a single member at-large.

District	Incumbent			This race	
District	Member	Party	First elected	Results	Candidates
Michigan 1	Jacob M. Howard; Redistricted from the at-large district	Whig	1840	Incumbent lost re-election. Democratic gain.	▌ ✓ Robert McClelland (Democratic) 55.4%; ▌Jacob M. Howard (Whig) 38.7%; ▌Arthur S. Porter (Liberty) 5.8%
Michigan 2	None (New seat)			New seat. Democratic gain.	▌ ✓ Lucius Lyon (Democratic) 52.6%; ▌Joseph R. Williams (Whig) 38.2%; ▌Rufus B. Bement (Liberty) 9.2%
Michigan 3	None (New seat)			New seat. Democratic gain.	▌ ✓ James B. Hunt (Democratic) 56.6%; ▌Thomas J. Drake (Whig) 36.5%; ▌William Caulfield (Liberty) 6.9%

== Mississippi ==
Mississippi gained 2 seats, going from 2 to 4 members. Elections were held at-large on a general ticket November 6–7, 1843, after the March 4, 1843 beginning of the term. Due to a banking crisis in Mississippi, the state Democratic party was split into two factions; the Redemptions, which favored the repudiation of bank bonds, and Anti-Redemptions, which opposed it.

District	Incumbent			This race	
District	Member	Party	First elected	Results	Candidates
Mississippi at-large (4 seats)	Jacob Thompson	Democratic	1839	Incumbent re-elected.	▌ ✓ Jacob Thompson (Democratic Redemption) 14.97%; ▌ ✓ William H. Hammett (Democratic Redemption) 14.32%; ▌ ✓ Robert W. Roberts (Democratic Redemption) 13.91%; ▌ ✓ Tilghman Tucker (Democratic Redemption) 12.24%; ▌Volney E. Tucker (Democratic Anti-Redemption) 11.74%; ▌Joseph Dunbar (Democratic Anti-Redemption) 11.36%; ▌John Gilmer (Democratic Anti-Redemption) 10.95%; ▌William G. Kendall (Democratic Anti-Redemption) 10.52%
Mississippi at-large (4 seats)	William M. Gwin	Democratic	1841	Incumbent retired. Democratic hold.	▌ ✓ Jacob Thompson (Democratic Redemption) 14.97%; ▌ ✓ William H. Hammett (Democratic Redemption) 14.32%; ▌ ✓ Robert W. Roberts (Democratic Redemption) 13.91%; ▌ ✓ Tilghman Tucker (Democratic Redemption) 12.24%; ▌Volney E. Tucker (Democratic Anti-Redemption) 11.74%; ▌Joseph Dunbar (Democratic Anti-Redemption) 11.36%; ▌John Gilmer (Democratic Anti-Redemption) 10.95%; ▌William G. Kendall (Democratic Anti-Redemption) 10.52%
Mississippi at-large (4 seats)	None (new seat)			New seat. Democratic gain.	▌ ✓ Jacob Thompson (Democratic Redemption) 14.97%; ▌ ✓ William H. Hammett (Democratic Redemption) 14.32%; ▌ ✓ Robert W. Roberts (Democratic Redemption) 13.91%; ▌ ✓ Tilghman Tucker (Democratic Redemption) 12.24%; ▌Volney E. Tucker (Democratic Anti-Redemption) 11.74%; ▌Joseph Dunbar (Democratic Anti-Redemption) 11.36%; ▌John Gilmer (Democratic Anti-Redemption) 10.95%; ▌William G. Kendall (Democratic Anti-Redemption) 10.52%
Mississippi at-large (4 seats)	None (new seat)			New seat. Democratic gain.	▌ ✓ Jacob Thompson (Democratic Redemption) 14.97%; ▌ ✓ William H. Hammett (Democratic Redemption) 14.32%; ▌ ✓ Robert W. Roberts (Democratic Redemption) 13.91%; ▌ ✓ Tilghman Tucker (Democratic Redemption) 12.24%; ▌Volney E. Tucker (Democratic Anti-Redemption) 11.74%; ▌Joseph Dunbar (Democratic Anti-Redemption) 11.36%; ▌John Gilmer (Democratic Anti-Redemption) 10.95%; ▌William G. Kendall (Democratic Anti-Redemption) 10.52%

== Missouri ==
Missouri gained 3 seats, going from 2 to 5 members. Elections were held at-large on a general ticket August 1, 1842.

District	Incumbent			This race	
District	Member	Party	First elected	Results	Candidates
Missouri at-large 5 seats on a general ticket					▌ ✓ John Jameson (Democratic) 19.31%; ▌ ✓ James B. Bowlin (Democratic) 19.06%; ▌ ✓ James M. Hughes (Democratic) 18.98%; ▌ ✓ James H. Relfe (Democratic) 18.90%; ▌ ✓ Gustavus M. Bower (Democratic) 18.47%; ▌John P. Campbell (Democratic) 4.44%

== New Hampshire ==
New Hampshire lost 1 seat, going from 5 to 4 members. Elections were held at-large on a general ticket March 3, 1843.

District	Incumbent			This race	
District	Member	Party	First elected	Results	Candidates
New Hampshire at-large 4 seats on a general ticket					

== New Jersey ==
New Jersey lost 1 seats, going from 6 to 5 members. Elections were held from districts October 8, 1842, having previously elected them at-large.

District	Incumbent			This race	
District	Member	Party	First elected	Results	Candidates
New Jersey 1	Joseph Fitz Randolph; Redistricted from the at-large district	Whig	1836	Incumbent retired. Democratic gain.	▌ ✓ Lucius Elmer (Democratic) 51.33%; ▌Edmond L. Wales (Whig) 48.67%
New Jersey 2	John B. Aycrigg; Redistricted from the at-large district	Whig	1836; 1838 (not seated (Note: See the Broad Seal War)); 1840	Incumbent retired. Democratic gain.	▌ ✓ George Sykes (Democratic) 51.98%; ▌William Irick (Whig) 48.02%
New Jersey 3	William Halstead; Redistricted from the at-large district	Whig	1836; 1838 (not seated); 1840	Unknown if incumbent retired or lost. Democratic gain.	▌ ✓ Isaac G. Farlee (Democratic); Unopposed
New Jersey 4	John Patterson Bryan Maxwell; Redistricted from the at-large district	Whig	1836; 1838 (not seated); 1840	Unknown if incumbent retired or lost. Democratic gain.	▌ ✓ Littleton Kirkpatrick (Democratic) 51.06%; ▌Samuel B. Halsey (Whig) 48.94%
New Jersey 5	Charles C. Stratton; Redistricted from the at-large district	Whig	1836; 1838 (not seated); 1840	Incumbent retired. Whig hold.	▌ ✓ William Wright (Ind. Whig) 52.68%; ▌William B. Winney (Whig) 48.32%
New Jersey 5	Thomas Jones Yorke; Redistricted from the at-large district	Whig	1836; 1838 (not seated); 1840	Unknown if incumbent retired or lost. Whig loss.	▌ ✓ William Wright (Ind. Whig) 52.68%; ▌William B. Winney (Whig) 48.32%

== New York ==
New York lost 6 seats, going from 40 to 34 members, but remaining the largest delegation. Its thirty-four members were elected November 8, 1842.

District	Incumbent			This race	
District	Member	Party	First elected	Results	Candidates
New York 1
New York 2
New York 3
New York 4
New York 5
New York 6
New York 7
New York 8
New York 9
New York 10
New York 11
New York 12
New York 13
New York 14
New York 15
New York 16
New York 17
New York 18
New York 19
New York 20
New York 21
New York 22
New York 23
New York 24
New York 25
New York 26
New York 27
New York 28
New York 29
New York 30
New York 31
New York 32
New York 33
New York 34

== North Carolina ==
North Carolina lost 4 seats, going from 13 to 9 members. Elections were held August 3, 1843, after the March 4, 1843 beginning of the term.

District	Incumbent			This race	
District	Member	Party	First elected	Results	Candidates
North Carolina 1
North Carolina 2
North Carolina 3
North Carolina 4
North Carolina 5
North Carolina 6
North Carolina 7
North Carolina 8
North Carolina 9

== Ohio ==
Ohio gained 2 seats, going from 19 to 21 members. Its twenty-one members were elected October 10, 1843, after the March 4, 1843 beginning of the term.

District	Incumbent			This race	
District	Member	Party	First elected	Results	Candidates
Ohio 1
Ohio 2
Ohio 3
Ohio 4
Ohio 5
Ohio 6
Ohio 7
Ohio 8
Ohio 9
Ohio 10
Ohio 11
Ohio 12
Ohio 13
Ohio 14
Ohio 15
Ohio 16
Ohio 17
Ohio 18
Ohio 19
Ohio 20
Ohio 21

== Pennsylvania ==
Pennsylvania lost 4 seats, going from 28 to 24 members. Its twenty-four members were elected October 10, 1843, after the March 4, 1843 beginning of the term.

District	Incumbent			This race	
District	Member	Party	First elected	Results	Candidates
Pennsylvania 1
Pennsylvania 2
Pennsylvania 3
Pennsylvania 4
Pennsylvania 5
Pennsylvania 6
Pennsylvania 7
Pennsylvania 8
Pennsylvania 9
Pennsylvania 10
Pennsylvania 11
Pennsylvania 12
Pennsylvania 13
Pennsylvania 14
Pennsylvania 15
Pennsylvania 16
Pennsylvania 17
Pennsylvania 18
Pennsylvania 19
Pennsylvania 20
Pennsylvania 21
Pennsylvania 22
Pennsylvania 23
Pennsylvania 24

== Rhode Island ==
Rhode Island stayed at 2 seats, but elected its members from districts, having previously elected them at-large. Elections were held August 29, 1843, after the March 4, 1843 beginning of the term.

District	Incumbent			This race	
District	Member	Party	First elected	Results	Candidates
Rhode Island 1	Robert B. Cranston; Redistricted from the at-large district	Whig	1837	Unknown if incumbent retired or lost re-election. Law and Order gain.	▌ ✓ Henry Y. Cranston (Law and Order); [data missing]
Rhode Island 2	Joseph L. Tillinghast; Redistricted from the at-large district	Whig	1837	Incumbent retired. Law and Order gain.	▌ ✓ Elisha R. Potter (Law and Order); [data missing]

== South Carolina ==
South Carolina lost 2 seats, going from 9 to 7 members. Elections were held February 20–21, 1843.

District	Incumbent			This race	
District	Member	Party	First elected	Results	Candidates
South Carolina 1
South Carolina 2
South Carolina 3
South Carolina 4
South Carolina 5
South Carolina 6
South Carolina 7

== Tennessee ==
Tennessee lost 2 seats, going from 13 to 11 members. Elections were held August 3, 1842.

Tennessee Results, shaded according to winning candidates share of vote

District	Incumbent			This race	
District	Member	Party	First elected	Results	Candidates
Tennessee 1	Thomas D. Arnold	Whig	1841	Incumbent retired. Democratic gain.	▌ ✓ Andrew Johnson (Democratic) 52.31%; ▌John Aiken (Whig) 47.69%
Tennessee 2	Abraham McClellan	Democratic	1837	Incumbent retired. Whig gain.	▌ ✓ William T. Senter (Whig) 59.03%; ▌William Wallace (Democratic) 40.97%
Tennessee 3	Joseph L. Williams	Whig	1837	Incumbent lost renomination. Whig loss.	▌ ✓ Julius W. Blackwell (Democratic) 50.41%; ▌Thomas J. Campbell (Whig) 49.60%
Tennessee 3	Thomas J. Campbell; Redistricted from the 4th district	Whig	1841	Incumbent lost re-election. Democratic gain.	▌ ✓ Julius W. Blackwell (Democratic) 50.41%; ▌Thomas J. Campbell (Whig) 49.60%
Tennessee 4	None (new district)			New district. Democratic gain.	▌ ✓ Alvan Cullom (Democratic) 58.66%; ▌Thomas L. Bransford (Whig) 41.34%
Tennessee 5	Hopkins L. Turney	Democratic	1837	Incumbent retired. Democratic hold.	▌ ✓ George W. Jones (Democratic) 63.46%; ▌Medicas H. Long (Whig) 36.54%
Tennessee 6	William B. Campbell	Whig	1837	Incumbent retired. Whig loss.	▌ ✓ Aaron V. Brown (Democratic) 52.76%; ▌Neill S. Brown (Whig) 47.24%
Tennessee 6	Aaron V. Brown; Redistricted from the 10th district	Democratic	1839	Incumbent re-elected.	▌ ✓ Aaron V. Brown (Democratic) 52.76%; ▌Neill S. Brown (Whig) 47.24%
Tennessee 7	Robert L. Caruthers	Whig	1841	Incumbent retired. Whig hold.	▌ ✓ David W. Dickinson (Whig) 100%
Tennessee 8	Meredith P. Gentry	Whig	1839	Incumbent retired. Whig hold.	▌ ✓ Joseph H. Peyton (Whig) 55.62%; ▌David Donalson (Democratic) 44.38%
Tennessee 9	Harvey M. Watterson	Democratic	1839	Incumbent retired. Democratic loss.	▌ ✓ Cave Johnson (Democratic) 51.19%; ▌G. A. Henry (Whig) 48.81%
Tennessee 9	Cave Johnson; Redistricted from the 11th district	Democratic	1839	Incumbent re-elected.	▌ ✓ Cave Johnson (Democratic) 51.19%; ▌G. A. Henry (Whig) 48.81%
Tennessee 10	None (new district)			New district. Whig gain.	▌ ✓ John B. Ashe (Whig) 50.85%; ▌Frederick P. Staunton (Democratic) 49.15%
Tennessee 11	Milton Brown; Redistricted from the 12th district	Whig	1841	Incumbent re-elected.	▌ ✓ Milton Brown (Whig) 61.12%; ▌Stephen C. Davatt (Democratic) 38.88%

== Vermont ==
Vermont lost 1 seat, going from 5 to 4 members. Elections were held September 5, 1843, after the March 4, 1843 beginning of the term.

District	Incumbent			This race	
District	Member	Party	First elected	Results	Candidates
Vermont 1	Hiland Hall	Whig	1833 (special)	Incumbent retired. Whig hold.	▌ ✓ Solomon Foot (Whig) 54.5%; ▌Caleb B. Harrington (Democratic) 40.5%
Vermont 2	William Slade	Whig	1831 (special)	Incumbent retired. Whig hold.	First ballot: ▌Jacob Collamer (Whig) 48.9%; ▌Truman B. Ransom (Democratic) 38.7%; ▌Titus Hutchinson (Liberty) 10.2%; Second ballot: ▌ ✓ Jacob Collamer (Whig) 54.1%; ▌Truman B. Ransom (Democratic) 39.4%; ▌Titus Hutchinson (Liberty) 5.0%; ▌Horace Everett (Whig) 1.5%
Vermont 2	Horace Everett; Redistricted from the 3rd district	Whig	1828	Incumbent lost re-election. Whig loss.	First ballot: ▌Jacob Collamer (Whig) 48.9%; ▌Truman B. Ransom (Democratic) 38.7%; ▌Titus Hutchinson (Liberty) 10.2%; Second ballot: ▌ ✓ Jacob Collamer (Whig) 54.1%; ▌Truman B. Ransom (Democratic) 39.4%; ▌Titus Hutchinson (Liberty) 5.0%; ▌Horace Everett (Whig) 1.5%
Vermont 3	None (new district)			New district. Whig gain.	▌ ✓ George P. Marsh (Whig) 53.4%; ▌John Smith (Democratic) 39.3%; ▌William H. French (Unknown) 6.1%
Vermont 4	Augustus Young	Whig	1840	Incumbent retired. Democratic gain.	▌ ✓ Paul Dillingham (Democratic) 50.8%; ▌George B. Chandler (Whig) 40.4%
Vermont 5	Isaac Fletcher	Whig	1840	Incumbent retired. District eliminated. Whig loss.	None

== Virginia ==
Virginia lost 6 seats, going from 21 to 15 members. Elections were held April 27, 1843, after the March 4, 1843 beginning of the term.

District	Incumbent			This race	
District	Member	Party	First elected	Results	Candidates
Virginia 1	Francis Mallory	Whig	1840 (special)	Incumbent retired. Democratic gain.	▌ ✓ Archibald Atkinson (Democratic) 50.1%; ▌James E. Langhorne (Whig) 49.9%
Virginia 2	George B. Cary	Democratic	1841	Incumbent retired. Democratic hold.	▌ ✓ George Dromgoole (Democratic) 87.7%; ▌William B. Robertson (Whig) 12.3%
Virginia 2	William Goode; Redistricted from the 4th district	Democratic	1841	Incumbent retired. Democratic loss.	▌ ✓ George Dromgoole (Democratic) 87.7%; ▌William B. Robertson (Whig) 12.3%
Virginia 3	Walter Coles; Redistricted from the 6th district	Democratic	1835	Incumbent re-elected.	▌ ✓ Walter Coles (Democratic) 51.3%; ▌[FNU] Gilmer (Whig) 48.7%
Virginia 4	Edmund W. Hubard; Redistricted from the 5th district	Democratic	1841	Incumbent re-elected.	▌ ✓ Edmund W. Hubard (Democratic) 51.5%; ▌Richard H. Toler (Whig) 48.5%
Virginia 5	William L. Goggin; Redistricted from the 7th district	Whig	1839	Incumbent lost re-election. Whig loss.	▌ ✓ Thomas W. Gilmer (Democratic) 50.2%; ▌William L. Goggin (Whig) 49.8%
Virginia 5	Thomas W. Gilmer; Redistricted from the 12th district	Whig	1841	Incumbent re-elected as a Democrat. Democratic gain.	▌ ✓ Thomas W. Gilmer (Democratic) 50.2%; ▌William L. Goggin (Whig) 49.8%
Virginia 6	John Winston Jones; Redistricted from the 3rd district	Democratic	1835	Incumbent re-elected.	▌ ✓ John Winston Jones (Democratic) 100%
Virginia 6	John Botts; Redistricted from the 11th district	Whig	1839	Incumbent lost re-election. Whig loss.	▌ ✓ John Winston Jones (Democratic) 100%
Virginia 7	Henry A. Wise; Redistricted from the 8th district	Whig	1833	Incumbent re-elected as a Democrat. Democratic gain.	▌ ✓ Henry A. Wise (Democratic) 57.2%; ▌Hitt Carter (Whig) 42.8%
Virginia 8	Robert M. T. Hunter; Redistricted from the 9th district	Independent	1837	Incumbent lost re-election. Whig gain.	▌ ✓ Willoughby Newton (Whig) 53.8%; ▌Robert M. T. Hunter (Independent) 46.2%
Virginia 9	William Smith; Redistricted from the 13th district	Democratic	1841 (special)	Incumbent lost re-election. Whig gain.	▌ ✓ Samuel Chilton (Whig) 59.9%; ▌William Smith (Democratic) 40.1%
Virginia 10	John Taliaferro	Whig	1835	Incumbent retired. Whig loss.	▌ ✓ William Lucas (Democratic) 56.2%; ▌Charles James Faulkner (Whig) 43.8%
Virginia 10	Richard W. Barton; Redistricted from the 15th district	Whig	1841	Incumbent retired. Democratic gain.	▌ ✓ William Lucas (Democratic) 56.2%; ▌Charles James Faulkner (Whig) 43.8%
Virginia 11	Alexander H. H. Stuart; Redistricted from the 17th district	Whig	1841	Incumbent lost re-election. Democratic gain.	▌ ✓ William Taylor (Democratic) 61.9%; ▌Alexander H. H. Stuart (Whig) 38.1%
Virginia 12	None (new district)			New district. Democratic gain.	▌ ✓ Augustus A. Chapman (Democratic) 64.6%; ▌James B. Watts (Whig) 35.4%
Virginia 13	George W. Hopkins; Redistricted from the 18th district	Democratic	1835	Incumbent re-elected.	▌ ✓ George W. Hopkins (Democratic) 57.1%; ▌John H. Fulton (Whig) 42.9%
Virginia 14	Cuthbert Powell	Whig	1841	Incumbent retired. Whig loss.	▌ ✓ George W. Summers (Whig) 52.6%; ▌Samuel L. Hays (Democratic) 47.4%
Virginia 14	Samuel L. Hays; Redistricted from the 20th district	Democratic	1841	Incumbent lost re-election. Democratic loss.	▌ ✓ George W. Summers (Whig) 52.6%; ▌Samuel L. Hays (Democratic) 47.4%
Virginia 14	George W. Summers; Redistricted from the 19th district	Whig	1841	Incumbent re-elected.	▌ ✓ George W. Summers (Whig) 52.6%; ▌Samuel L. Hays (Democratic) 47.4%
Virginia 15	Lewis Steenrod; Redistricted from the 21st district	Democratic	1839	Incumbent re-elected.	▌ ✓ Lewis Steenrod (Democratic) 100%
Virginia 16	William A. Harris	Democratic	1841	Incumbent retired. District eliminated. Democratic loss.	None

== Wisconsin Territory ==
See Non-voting delegates, below.

== Non-voting delegates ==
District	Incumbent			This race	
District	Delegate	Party	First elected	Results	Candidates
Florida Territory at-large	David Levy Yulee	Democratic	1840	Incumbent re-elected.	▌ ✓ David Levy Yulee (Democratic); [data missing]
Iowa Territory at-large	Augustus C. Dodge	Democratic	1840	Incumbent re-elected.	▌ ✓ Augustus C. Dodge (Democratic); [data missing]
Wisconsin Territory at-large

== See also ==
- 1842 United States elections
  - 1842–43 United States Senate elections
- 27th United States Congress
- 28th United States Congress

== Bibliography ==
- Dubin, Michael J. (March 1, 1998). United States Congressional Elections, 1788–1997: The Official Results of the Elections of the 1st Through 105th Congresses. McFarland and Company. ISBN 978-0786402830.
- Martis, Kenneth C. (January 1, 1989). The Historical Atlas of Political Parties in the United States Congress, 1789–1989. Macmillan Publishing Company. ISBN 978-0029201701.
- Moore, John L., ed. (1994). Congressional Quarterly's Guide to U.S. Elections (Third ed.). Congressional Quarterly Inc. ISBN 978-0871879967.
- "Party Divisions of the House of Representatives* 1789–Present". Office of the Historian, House of United States House of Representatives.
