= Norton Center Historic District =

Historic district in Massachusetts, United States

- U.S. National Register of Historic Places
- U.S. Historic district
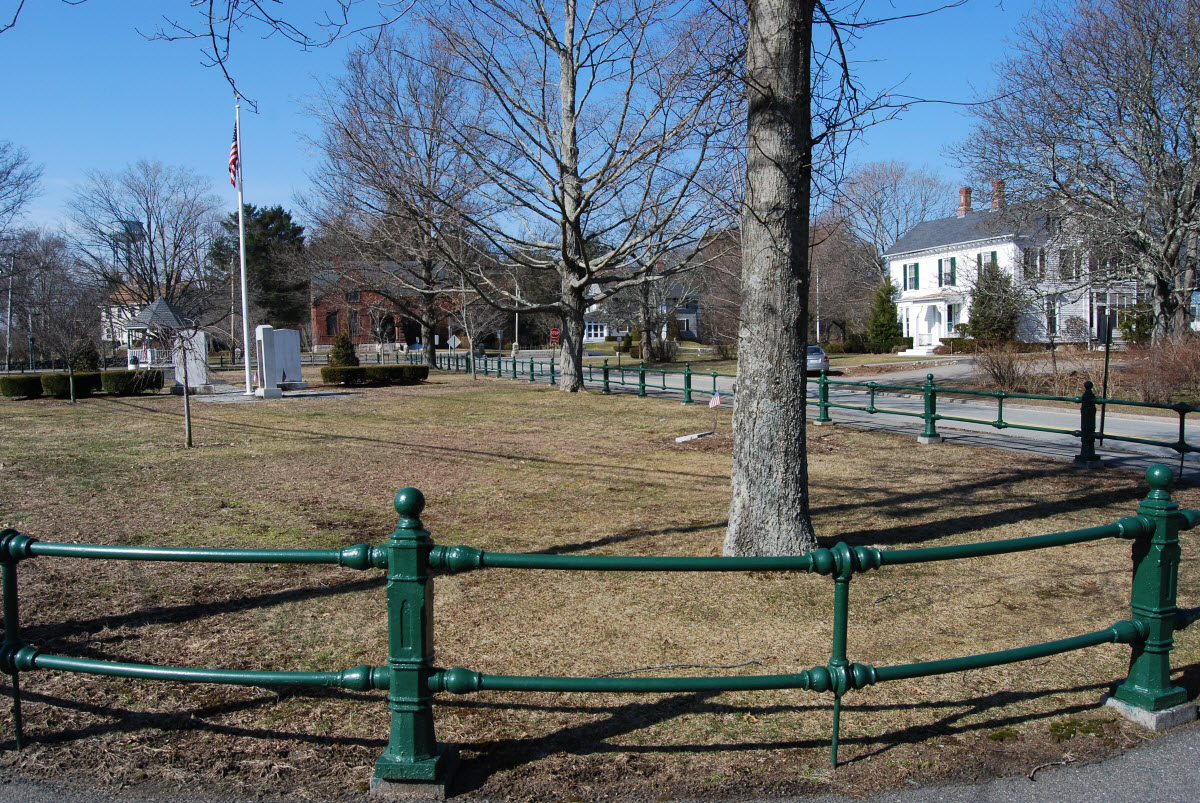
- Norton Town Common

- Location within Massachusetts Location within the United States
- Location: Norton, Massachusetts
- Coordinates: 41°58′3″N 71°11′10″W
- Area: 50 acres (20 ha)
- Architect: Multiple
- Architectural style: Colonial Revival, Greek Revival
- NRHP reference No.: 77000170
- Added to NRHP: December 23, 1977

The Norton Center Historic District is a historic district encompassing the town center and adjacent Wheaton College campus in Norton, Massachusetts. It includes the town's major civic buildings, as well as its oldest surviving house, in a spacious New England town center organized around the town common at the junction of Massachusetts Routes 123 and 140. The district was added to the National Register of Historic Places in 1977.

== Description and history ==
The town of Norton was settled in the 1660s, but did not incorporate until 1711. Colonial laws at the time required the town to build a residence for a minister as a condition of incorporation: the town's first parsonage, built in 1710 to enable incorporation, still stands facing the town common. Two churches, both originating in the town's first Congregationalist organization, also stand facing the common. The town library, built in 1888, was a gift from the locally prominent Wheaton family. The house of Laban Wheaton, its best-known member, now serves as the official residence of the president of Wheaton College. That school was founded in 1834 as a women's school, and was where pioneering female educator Mary Lyon taught before founding Mount Holyoke College.

The historic district's principal focal point is the triangular town common, bounded by East and West Main Street and Mansfield Street, with Taunton Street extending southward. The common is actually near the western end of the district, because the campus of Wheaton College extends to the east on the south side of East Main Street. The eastern end of the district is a cluster of buildings at the junction of East Main Street with Elm and Pine Streets. The district's modern intrusions include a post office building, and relatively non-descript college buildings, the latter of which generally do not intrude on the street view.

== See also ==
- National Register of Historic Places listings in Bristol County, Massachusetts
