= Charles Brown (Pennsylvania politician) =

American politician

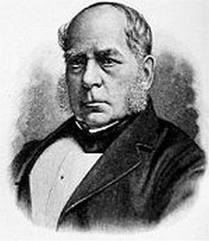

Member of the U.S. House of Representatives from Pennsylvania
- In office March 4, 1847 – March 3, 1849
- Preceded by: John H. Campbell
- Succeeded by: Henry D. Moore
- Constituency: 3rd district
- In office March 4, 1841 – March 3, 1843
- Preceded by: Lemuel Paynter
- Succeeded by: Edward J. Morris
- Constituency: 1st district

Member of the Pennsylvania State Senate from the 2nd district
- In office 1838–1841

Member of the Pennsylvania House of Representatives from Philadelphia City
- In office 1830–1833

Personal details
- Born: September 23, 1797 Philadelphia, Pennsylvania, U.S.
- Died: September 4, 1883 (aged 85) Dover, Delaware, U.S.
- Resting place: Laurel Hill Cemetery, Philadelphia, Pennsylvania, U.S.
- Party: Democratic

Charles Brown (September 23, 1797 – September 4, 1883) was an American politician from Pennsylvania who served as a Democratic member of the U.S. House of Representatives for Pennsylvania's 1st congressional district from 1841 to 1843 and Pennsylvania's 3rd congressional district from 1847 to 1849. He also served as a member of the Pennsylvania House of Representatives from 1830 to 1833 and as a Pennsylvania State Senator for the 2nd district from 1838 to 1841.

== Early life ==
Charles Brown was born in Philadelphia. In early boyhood moved with his father to Cumberland County, New Jersey, and resided near Bridgeton, New Jersey. He was an officer in the State militia from 1817 to 1819. He served as town clerk of Dover Township, New Jersey (now Toms River Township), in 1819, and taught school at Dividing Creek, New Jersey, in 1820 and 1821. He returned to Philadelphia in 1823 and engaged in the cordwood business.

== Pennsylvania state service ==
He was appointed a director of the Philadelphia public schools in 1828, and served as a member of the Philadelphia City Council in 1830 and 1831. He served in the Pennsylvania House of Representatives from 1830 to 1833, and was a delegate to the convention to revise the constitution of Pennsylvania from 1834 to 1838. He served in the Pennsylvania State Senate from 1838 to 1841.

== United States House of Representatives ==
Brown was elected as a Democrat to the Twenty-seventh Congress. He was not a candidate for reelection in 1842. He served as president of the State convention to nominate candidates for the board of canal commissioners in 1843, and was a member of the board of commissioners for Northern Liberties Township, Pennsylvania, in 1843. He was again elected to the Thirtieth Congress. He was not a candidate for reelection in 1848.

== Later life ==
He was a member of the board of inspectors of the Eastern State Penitentiary from 1851 to 1853, and was collector of customs at the port of Philadelphia from 1853 to 1857. He was also member of the board of guardians of the poor of Philadelphia in 1860. He moved to Dover, Delaware, in 1861 and engaged in agricultural pursuits. He served as town commissioner of Dover in 1864 and 1865. He was a delegate to the National Union Convention at Philadelphia in 1866. He served as president of the board of trustees of the Dover public schools from 1871 to 1878. He died in Dover and was interred at the Laurel Hill Cemetery in Philadelphia.

== Personal life ==
Brown was the son-in-law of Francis Rawn Shunk, 10th Governor of Pennsylvania and father of Francis Shunk Brown, Attorney General of Pennsylvania from 1915 to 1919. He married Elizabeth Shunk (1825–1865) late in life and they had four girls and four boys between 1849 and 1865. Their third son, William Findlay Brown (1861–1934), was a Philadelphia lawyer and Fairmount Park Commissioner.

== Notes ==
U.S. House of Representatives
| Preceded by Lemuel Paynter | Member of the U.S. House of Representatives from Pennsylvania's 1st congressional district 1841–1843 | Succeeded by Edward J. Morris |
| Preceded by John H. Campbell | Member of the U.S. House of Representatives from Pennsylvania's 3rd congressional district 1847–1849 | Succeeded by Henry D. Moore |
Pennsylvania State Senate
| Preceded by Alexander M. Peltz | Member of the Pennsylvania Senate, 2nd district 1838-1841 | Succeeded by Michael Snyder |
