= Edwin Lawrence =

Edwin Lawrence may refer to:

- Edwin Durning-Lawrence (1837–1914), British lawyer and Member of Parliament
- Edwin Lawrence (Michigan jurist) (1808–1885), American jurist and politician
