= Senator Mansue =

Senator Mansue may refer to:

- Joseph W. Mansur (1808–1891), Massachusetts State Senate
- Zophar M. Mansur (1843–1914), Vermont State Senate
