= Senator Paynter (disambiguation) =

Thomas H. Paynter (1851–1921) was a U.S. Senator from Kentucky from 1907 to 1913. Senator Paynter may also refer to:

- Lemuel Paynter (1788–1863), Pennsylvania State Senate
- Samuel Paynter (1768–1845), Delaware State Senate

== See also ==
- William Rock Painter (1863–1947), Missouri State Senate
