= Senator Mansur =

Senator Mansur may refer to:

- Joseph W. Mansur (1808–1892), Massachusetts State Senate
- Zophar Mansur (1843–1914), Vermont State Senate
