= Lancelot Phelps =

American politician (1784–1866)

Member of the U.S. House of Representatives from Connecticut
- In office March 4, 1835 – March 3, 1839
- Preceded by: Noyes Barber (AL); District established (5th)
- Succeeded by: District eliminated (AL); Truman Smith (5th)
- Constituency: At-large district (1835-37); 5th district (1837-39)

Personal details
- Born: November 9, 1784 Windsor, Connecticut, U.S.
- Died: September 1, 1866 (aged 81) Colebrook, Connecticut, U.S
- Resting place: Center Cemetery, Winsted, Connecticut
- Party: Democratic
- Other political affiliations: Jacksonian (before 1837)

Lancelot Phelps (November 9, 1784 – September 1, 1866) was an American physician and businessman who served two terms as a United States representative from Connecticut from 1835 to 1839.

He was the father of James Phelps who was also a United States Representative from Connecticut.

== Biography ==
He was born in Windsor, Connecticut, before moving with his family to Colebrook, Connecticut, in 1794. He attended the common schools and the studied medicine and commenced practice in Colebrook, Connecticut. He also engaged in agricultural and mercantile pursuits in Riverton, Connecticut. Later, he returned to Colebrook.

=== Political career ===
Phelps held various local offices. He was a member of the Connecticut House of Representatives in 1817, 1819–1821, 1824, 1827, 1828, and 1830. He was elected as a Jacksonian to the Twenty-fourth Congress and reelected as a Democrat to the Twenty-fifth Congress (March 4, 1835 – March 3, 1839).

=== Death and burial ===
He died in Colebrook, Connecticut, in 1866 and was buried in Center Cemetery, Winsted, Connecticut.

== Footnotes ==
U.S. House of Representatives
Preceded by Ebenezer Young	Member of the U.S. House of Representatives from Connecticut's at-large congressional district 1835–1837	Succeeded by District inactive
Preceded by District created	Member of the U.S. House of Representatives from Connecticut's 5th congressional district 1837–1839	Succeeded by Truman Smith
