= Josiah Dean =

American politician (1748–1818)

Member of the U.S. House of Representatives from Massachusetts's 9th district
- In office March 4, 1807 – March 3, 1809
- Preceded by: Phanuel Bishop
- Succeeded by: Laban Wheaton

Personal details
- Born: March 6, 1748 Raynham, Province of Massachusetts Bay, British America
- Died: October 14, 1818 (aged 70) Raynham, Massachusetts, U.S.
- Party: Democratic-Republican

Josiah Dean (March 6, 1748 – October 14, 1818) was a U.S. representative from Massachusetts. Born in Raynham in the Province of Massachusetts Bay, Dean attended the common schools. His primary business pursuits were in the rolling-mill and shipbuilding business. He served as the selectman in 1781, town clerk in 1805, and in the Massachusetts State Senate from 1804 to 1807.

Dean was elected to the Tenth United States Congress as a Democratic-Republican member of the House of Representatives. He served in this position for one term, which lasted from 1807 to 1809.

Following his tenure in Congress, he was elected to the State House of Representatives in 1810 and 1811.

Dean remained in the private sector for the remainder of his life. He died in Raynham, Massachusetts, on October 14, 1818, and was interred in Pleasant Street Cemetery.

U.S. House of Representatives
Preceded by Phanuel Bishop	Member of the U.S. House of Representatives from Massachusetts's 9th congressional district 1807–1809	Succeeded by Laban Wheaton
