= Lemuel Paynter =

American politician

Lemuel Paynter (1788 – August 1, 1863) was an American War of 1812 veteran who served two terms as a Democratic member of the U.S. House of Representatives from Pennsylvania from 1837 to 1841.

== Life and career ==
Lemuel Paynter was born in Lewes, Delaware. He moved to Philadelphia, Pennsylvania, and served in the War of 1812 and became major and lieutenant colonel of the Ninety-third Regiment, Pennsylvania Militia.

=== Early political career ===
He served as a member of the board of commissioners of the Southwark district for many years and also served as a president of the board. He was a member of the guardians of the poor and also a school director. He was elected a member of the Pennsylvania State Senate in 1833.

=== Congress ===
Paynter was elected as a Democrat to the Twenty-fifth and Twenty-sixth Congresses. He was not a candidate for renomination in 1840. He again served as a member of the board of commissioners of the Southwark district.

=== Death ===
He died in Philadelphia in 1863. He was buried in Union Sixth Street Cemetery which was closed in 1971 and his remains were moved to Philadelphia Memorial Park in Frazer, Pennsylvania.

== Sources ==
- United States Congress. "Lemuel Paynter (id: P000155)". Biographical Directory of the United States Congress.
- The Political Graveyard

U.S. House of Representatives
| Preceded by Joel Barlow Sutherland | Member of the U.S. House of Representatives from Pennsylvania's 1st congressional district 1837–1841 | Succeeded by Charles Brown |
