= John Hull Campbell =

American politician

Member of the U.S. House of Representatives from Pennsylvania's 3rd district
- In office March 4, 1845 – March 3, 1847
- Preceded by: John T. Smith
- Succeeded by: Charles Brown

Member of the Pennsylvania House of Representatives
- In office 1831

Personal details
- Born: October 10, 1800 York, Pennsylvania, US
- Died: January 19, 1868 (aged 67) Philadelphia, Pennsylvania, US
- Resting place: Lawnview Memorial Park, Rockledge, Pennsylvania, US
- Party: American Party

John Hull Campbell (October 10, 1800 – January 19, 1868) was an American politician from Pennsylvania who was an American Party member in the U.S. House of Representatives for Pennsylvania's 3rd congressional district from 1845 to 1847.

== Early life and education ==
Campbell was born in York, Pennsylvania. He studied law, was admitted to the bar in Philadelphia in 1823 and commenced practice there.

== Career ==
Campbell was elected to the Pennsylvania House of Representatives in 1831.

Campbell was elected as a candidate of the American Party to the Twenty-ninth Congress. He declined to be a candidate for renomination in 1846 and instead resumed his law practic He died in Philadelphia in 1868.

He was interred in Monument Cemetery in Philadelphia and reinterred in 1956 at Lawnview Memorial Park in Rockledge, Pennsylvania.

U.S. House of Representatives
Preceded by John T. Smith	Member of the U.S. House of Representatives from Pennsylvania's 3rd congressional district 1845–1847	Succeeded by Charles Brown
