= Thomas Burr Osborne (politician) =

American politician (1798–1869)

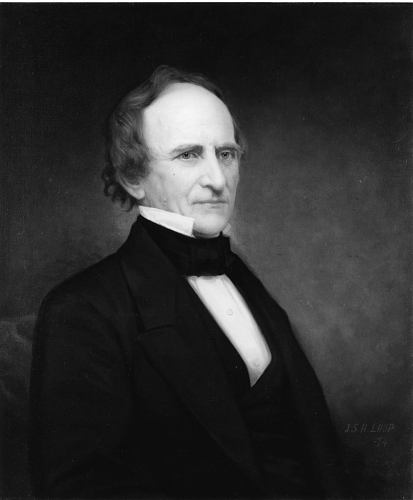

Member of the United States House of Representatives from Connecticut's 4th congressional district
- In office March 4, 1839 – March 3, 1843
- Preceded by: Thomas T. Whittlesey
- Succeeded by: Samuel Simons

Member of the Connecticut Senate
- In office 1844–

Member of the Connecticut House of Representatives
- In office 1836–
- In office 1850–

Personal details
- Born: July 8, 1798 Weston, Connecticut
- Died: September 2, 1869 (aged 71) New Haven, Connecticut
- Resting place: Evergreen Cemetery.
- Party: Whig
- Spouse: Elizabeth Huntington Dimon
- Education: Yale College (1817)

Thomas Burr Osborne (July 8, 1798 – September 2, 1869) was a U.S. representative from Connecticut. He also served as a member of the Connecticut House of Representatives and Connecticut Senate.

== Early life and family ==
Born in Easton, Connecticut (called Weston at the time), the son of Jeremiah and Anna (Sherwood) Osborne, he graduated from Yale College in 1817. He was married to Elizabeth Huntington Dimon, daughter of Ebenezer Dimon. Their daughter Mary Elizabeth Osborne married Henry B. Harrison, Governor of Connecticut from 1885 to 1887. Their son Arthur Dimon Osborne (April 17, 1828 – April 14, 1920) was a lawyer, law professor at Yale University, and president of the Second National Bank of New Haven. His son Thomas Burr Osborne (August 5, 1859 – January 29, 1929) was a biochemist and co-discoverer of Vitamin A.

== Political career ==
He was admitted to the bar in 1820 and commenced practice in Fairfield, Connecticut. He served as clerk of the county and superior courts 1826–1839. He served as member of the Connecticut House of Representatives in 1836.

Osborne was elected as a Whig to the Twenty-sixth and Twenty-seventh Congresses (March 4, 1839 – March 3, 1843). He served as chairman of the Committee on Patents (Twenty-seventh Congress).

He served in the Connecticut Senate in 1844, and the same year was appointed judge of the Fairfield County Court, which office he held for several years.

He was again a member of the state House of Representatives in 1850. He served as judge of probate for Fairfield district in 1851.

== Later life ==
He moved to New Haven in 1854. Osborne was a professor at Yale Law School from 1855 until 1865, when he resigned. He died in New Haven, Connecticut and was interred in Evergreen Cemetery.

Connecticut House of Representatives
Preceded by.	Member of the Connecticut House of Representatives; 1850	Succeeded by.
Preceded by.	Member of the Connecticut House of Representatives; 1836	Succeeded by.
Connecticut State Senate
Preceded by.	Member of the Connecticut State Senate; 1844	Succeeded by.
U.S. House of Representatives
Preceded by Thomas T. Whittlesey	Member of the U.S. House of Representatives from Connecticut's 4th congressional district 1839 - 1843	Succeeded by Samuel Simons
