= John T. Smith (politician) =

American politician (1801-1864)

Member of the U.S. House of Representatives from Pennsylvania's 3rd district
- In office March 4, 1843 – March 3, 1845
- Preceded by: Charles Jared Ingersoll
- Succeeded by: John Hull Campbell

Personal details
- Born: May 1801 Philadelphia, Pennsylvania, U.S.
- Died: March 30, 1864 (aged 62) Philadelphia, Pennsylvania, U.S.
- Resting place: Laurel Hill Cemetery, Philadelphia, Pennsylvania, U.S.
- Party: Democratic

John T. Smith (ca. May 1801 – March 30, 1864) was an American politician who served as a Democratic member of the U.S. House of Representatives for Pennsylvania's 3rd congressional district from 1843 to 1845.

== Early life and education ==
Smith was born in Philadelphia, Pennsylvania, circa May 1801, and educated in the local schools.

== Career ==
He worked in banking as an officer and member of the board of directors at the Kensington Bank, and served as president from 1854 to 1863. He was a member of the Board of Trustees at the Manufacturers’ and Mechanics’ Beneficial Savings Institution in Philadelphia’s Northern Liberties district.

A Democrat, Smith was elected to the United States House of Representatives from Pennsylvania’s 3rd District in 1842, and he served one term, March 4, 1843 to March 3, 1845.

Smith served for several years on the Board of Commissioners for Northern Liberties (now part of Philadelphia), and was the board’s President from 1840 to 1843 and 1846 to 1849. In addition, he served in appointive positions including Inspector of the Philadelphia County Prison.

He died on March 30, 1864 and was interred at Laurel Hill Cemetery in Philadelphia.

U.S. House of Representatives
Preceded by Charles Jared Ingersoll	Member of the U.S. House of Representatives from Pennsylvania's 3rd congressional district 1843–1845	Succeeded by John Hull Campbell
