= Henry W. Bishop =

American community leader (1829–1913)

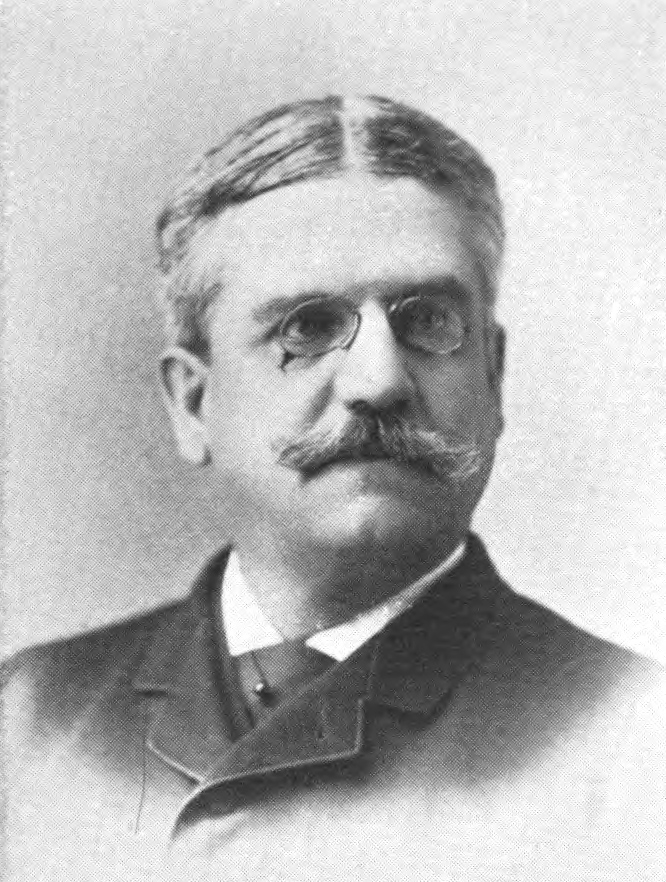
- Born: Henry Walker Bishop; June 2, 1829; Lenox, Massachusetts
- Died: September 28, 1913 (aged 84); Sea Bright, New Jersey
- Education: Amherst College
- Occupation: Lawyer

Henry Walker Bishop (June 2, 1829 – September 28, 1913) was a Massachusetts-born leading citizen of Chicago, Illinois in the late 19th century. He was the first president of the Union Club of Chicago, a private association organized by sixty of the city's leading gentlemen. His tenure lasted from 1878 to 1883. He later was president of the Chicago Club from 1892 through 1894.

A judicial official, he also served as a master in chancery.

== Biography ==
Henry W. Bishop was born in Lenox, Massachusetts on June 2, 1829. He attended Lenox Academy, and was briefly a student at Williams College, before graduating from Amherst in 1850.

After attending Harvard Law School and studying law with his father, he began practicing as a lawyer in Chicago in 1856.

He died in Sea Bright, New Jersey on September 28, 1913.

In his will, Bishop left $2.5 million to the John Crerar Library of engineering, medical, and science texts, located on the University of Chicago campus.
