= Truman Smith =

American politician

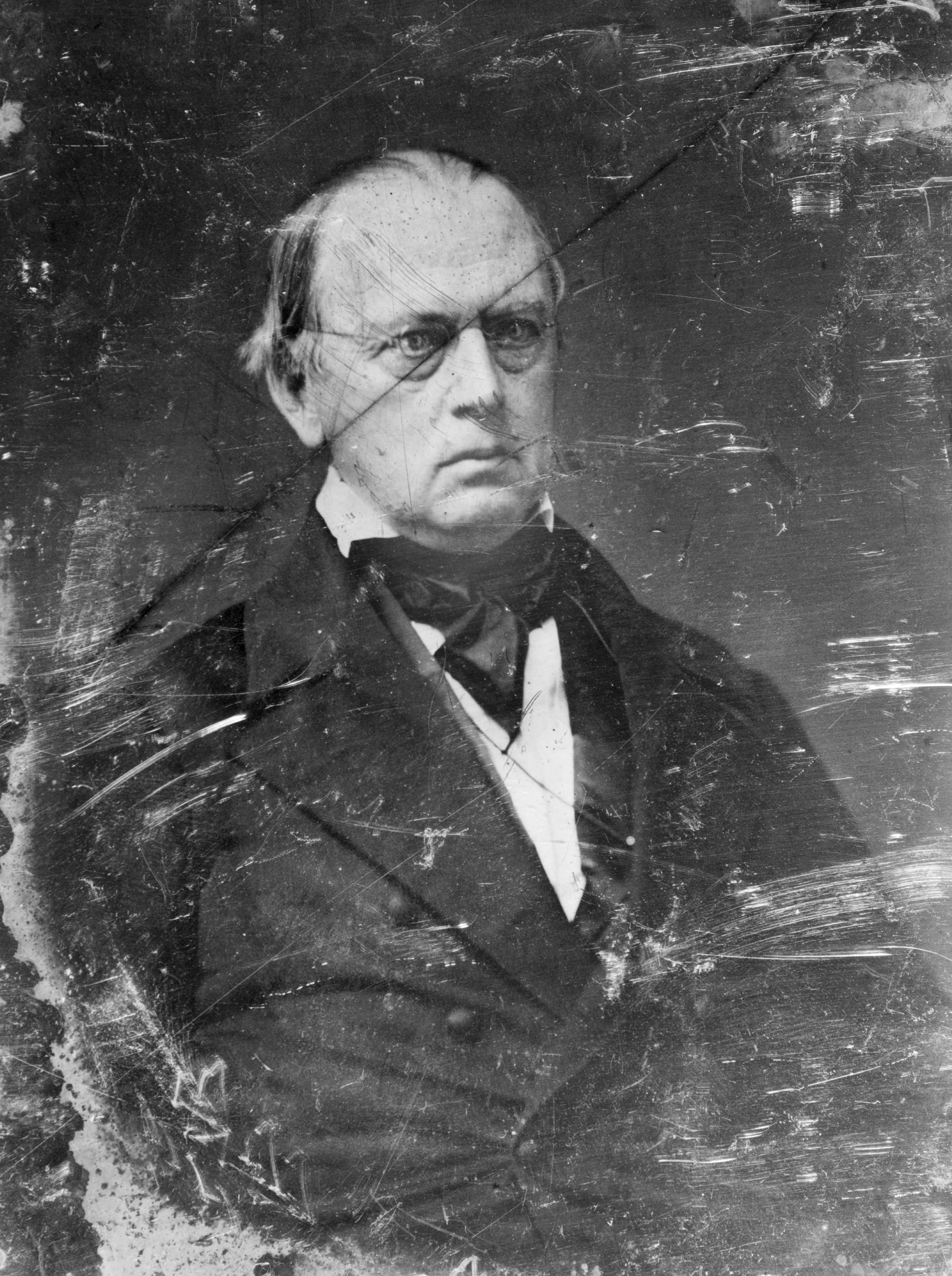

United States Senator from Connecticut
- In office March 4, 1849 – May 24, 1854
- Preceded by: John M. Niles
- Succeeded by: Francis Gillette

Member of the United States House of Representatives from Connecticut's 4th district
- In office March 4, 1845 – March 3, 1849
- Preceded by: Samuel Simons
- Succeeded by: Thomas B. Butler

Member of the United States House of Representatives from Connecticut's 5th district
- In office March 4, 1839 – March 3, 1843
- Preceded by: Lancelot Phelps
- Succeeded by: (none)

Member of the Connecticut House of Representatives
- In office 1831–1832; 1834

Personal details
- Born: November 27, 1791 Roxbury, Connecticut, U.S.
- Died: May 3, 1884 (aged 92) Stamford, Connecticut, U.S.
- Party: Whig
- Spouse(s): Maria Cook Smith, Mary Ann Dickinson Smith
- Children: Catherine Marie Smith, Jeannie Penniman (Jane) Smith, George Webster Smith, Truman Houston Smith, Samuel Hubbard Smith, Edmond Dickinson Smith, Robert Shufeldt Smith, Henry Humphry Smith, Allen Hoyt Smith
- Education: Yale College; Litchfield Law School
- Profession: Politician, Lawyer, Judge

Truman Smith (November 27, 1791 – May 3, 1884) was a Whig member of the United States Senate from Connecticut from 1849 to 1854 and a member of the United States House of Representatives from Connecticut's 4th and 5th congressional districts from 1839 to 1843 and from 1845 to 1849. He also served in the Connecticut House of Representatives from 1831 to 1832, and in 1834. Between 1846 and 1854, Smith oversaw the national campaigns of the Whigs in a role similar to a modern national party chairman.

== Biography ==
Smith was born in Roxbury, Connecticut. He was the nephew of Nathaniel Smith and Nathan Smith. Smith completed preparatory studies and graduated from Yale College in 1815, where he was a member of Brothers in Unity. He studied law at Litchfield Law School and was admitted to the bar in 1818, commencing practice in Litchfield, Connecticut. He married Maria Cook on June 2, 1832, and they had three children, Catherine Marie Smith, Jeannie Penniman (Jane) Smith, and George Webster Smith. His wife, Marie, died on April 20, 1849. He married Mary Ann Dickinson Walker on November 7, 1850, by whom he had six children, Truman Houston Smith, Samuel Hubbard Smith, Edmond Dickinson Smith, Robert Shufeldt Smith, Henry Humphry Smith, and Allen Hoyt Smith.

== Career ==
Smith was a member of the Connecticut House of Representatives from 1831 to 1832 and again in 1834. He was elected as a Whig to the United States House of Representatives, representing the 5th district, during the Twenty-sixth and Twenty-seventh Congresses, and serving from March 4, 1839, to March 3, 1843, declining renomination in 1842.

Smith was a presidential elector on the Whig ticket in 1844. He was elected back to the House of Representatives representing the 4th District for the Twenty-ninth and Thirtieth Congresses. He served from March 4, 1845, to March 3, 1849.

Between 1846 and 1854, Smith acted as a prototypical national party chairman for the Whig Party. In 1846, he traveled across the country collecting donations from business leaders. The funds were used to print and distribute pamphlets and speeches on the Whig platform and strengthen local Whig organizations in the states and territories. The Whigs did particularly well in the Congressional elections that fall, holding all of their Northern Congressional seats and picking up fourteen House Seats in New York, one in New Jersey, five in Pennsylvania, three in Ohio and one in Georgia, although they failed to gain Iowa's two new senatorial seats, which Smith spent considerable resources on. In the 1848 presidential election, Smith became an early backer of the candidacy of Zachary Taylor, believing that the general would have the broadest appeal to voters outside of Connecticut and other Whig strongholds. During the fall campaign, Smith sent contradictory pamphlets to Northern and Southern voters, arguing in the South that Taylor would best defend Southern interests as a slaveholder, and in the North that he would stand against slavery and support the Wilmot Proviso.

After Taylor's victory, many Whigs desired Smith's inclusion in the cabinet. However, he declined an appointment to be the first United States Secretary of the Interior from President Taylor in 1849, having been elected to the United States Senate. He was sworn in on March 4, 1849. In 1852, he supported Winfield Scott's campaign with pamphlets attacking the character and positions of Democrat Franklin Pierce. He overestimated Whig support in the South, leading to surprise when Scott was defeated in a landslide. After the election, Smith began regularly criticizing his fellow Whigs and expressed futility for the party's prospects. In correspondence with Thurlow Weed, he refused to help rally the Whigs for a comeback in the 1854 elections, declaring he would "never again lift a finger to put the Whig Party in power". He resigned from the Senate on May 24, 1854.

Afterwards, he lived in Stamford, Connecticut, with his second wife, Mary Ann Dickinson Smith, while practicing law in New York City. Mary Ann was the adopted daughter of the miniaturist Anson Dickinson. Smith's New York law office was open from 1854 to 1871. In 1862, President Abraham Lincoln appointed Smith judge of the Court of Arbitration under the treaty of 1862 with Great Britain for the suppression of the slave trade where he served until 1870.

== Death ==
Smith retired from business that year and died in Stamford, Connecticut, on May 3, 1884 (age 92 years, 158 days). He is interred at Stamford in Woodland Cemetery.

U.S. House of Representatives
Preceded by Lancelot Phelps	Member of the U.S. House of Representatives from Connecticut's 5th congressional district March 4, 1839 – March 3, 1843	Succeeded by (none)
Preceded by Samuel Simons	Member of the U.S. House of Representatives from Connecticut's 4th congressional district March 4, 1845 – March 3, 1849	Succeeded by Thomas B. Butler
U.S. Senate
Preceded by John M. Niles	U.S. senator (Class 3) from Connecticut; March 4, 1849 – May 24, 1854; Served alongside: Roger S. Baldwin and Isaac Toucey	Succeeded by Francis Gillette
