= Willoughby Newton =

American politician

Willoughby Newton (December 2, 1802 – May 23, 1874) was a nineteenth-century congressman and lawyer from Virginia.

== Biography ==
Born at "Lee Hall" near Hague, Virginia, he was the son of Willoughby Newton and Sarah "Sally" Bland Poythress (1768 – 24 May 1828), the widow of Richard "Squire" Lee and daughter of Peter Poythress (1715–1785) of "Branchester", and Elizabeth Bland (1733–1792).

He married Elizabeth Armistead about 1825. She died after only a year. He next married Mary Stevenson Brockenbrough (15 September 1810 – 9 January 1888), daughter of Judge William Brockenbrough, on 12 May 1830. The couple had eight children;

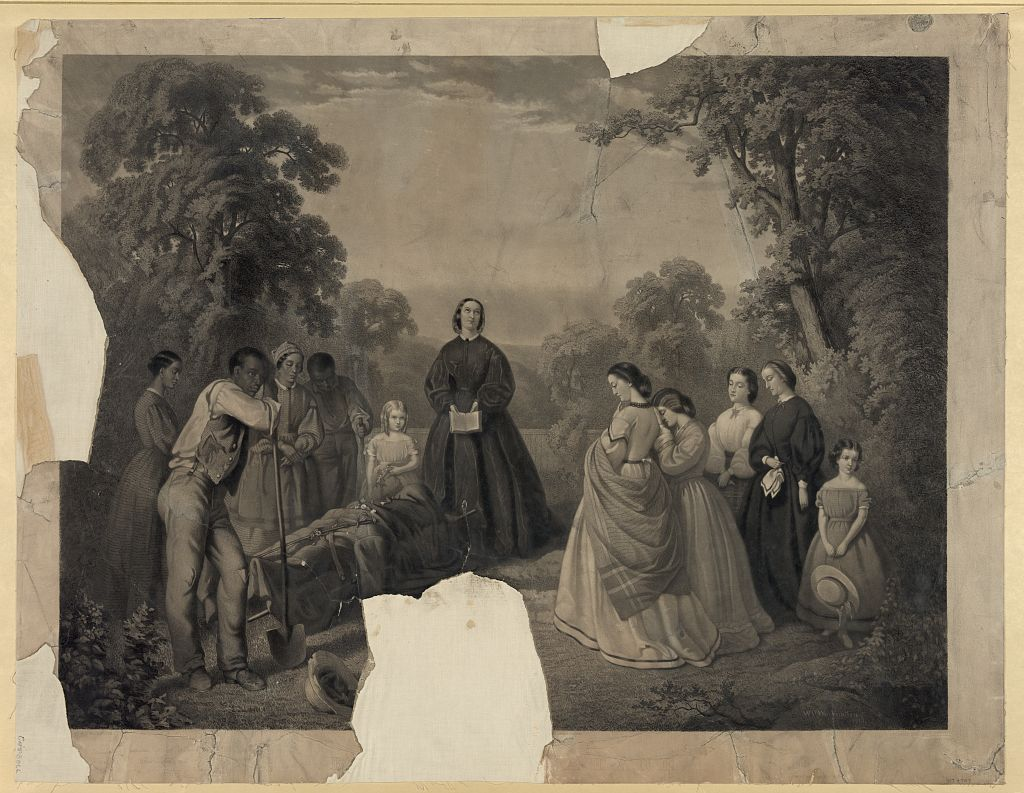
Burial of William D. Latané, C.S.A., on Summer Hill Plantation

1. William Brockenbrough Newton (15 April 1832 – 11 October 1863); Capt. of the 4th Virginia Cavalry (C.S.A.) killed at Raccoon Ford. He was a secessionist delegate in the General Assembly from Hanover County before the war. The famous painting "The Burial of Latane" was of the burial at his home, "Summer Hill", in Hanover which remains in the family.
2. Sarah Newton (b. 1833); married doctor Philip Smith
3. Mary Willoughby Newton (b. 1835); died young
4. Willoughby Newton III (1837 – 20 June 1897); married Elizabeth Lewis Marshall (1841–1888)
5. John B. Newton (7 Feb 1839 – 28 May 1897); Episcopal suffragan bishop of Virginia. Physician before the war and in Confederate service. He amputated his brother Willoughby's leg at the Battle of Chancellorsville. Willoughby's servant, John Willis, was handed the leg to bury and maintained until his death in 1926 that he was going to Heaven so he could tell Mr. Willoughby "where his leg was at."
6. Robert Murphey Newton (b. 15 May 1842)
7. Judith White Newton (b. 29 October 1843); married Edwin Claybrook
8. Edward Colston Newton (b. 1845; died 1913); married Lucy Yeats Tyler, daughter of Wat Henry Tyler and niece of President John Tyler. His son, Blake Tyler Newton, owned the homeplace "Linden" and was the state senator who cast the vote that broke "massive resistance". Edward Colston Newton has four living great grandsons, one of whom was Commonwealth's Attorney for Westmoreland County (E.C. Newton IV) and another who was a member of the Board of Directors of the Virginia Department of Game and Inland Fisheries (Charles Marshall Davison). He also has six living great-granddaughters.

He died at his family's estate, "Linden" in Westmoreland County, Virginia on May 23, 1874, and was interred there in a private cemetery.

== Career ==
Newton received a liberal education from private teachers as a child and went on to attend the College of William and Mary. He studied law and was admitted to the bar, commencing practice in Westmoreland County, Virginia. He was a member of the Virginia House of Delegates from 1826 to 1832 and was later elected a Whig to the United States House of Representatives in 1842, serving from 1843 to 1845. After failing to be reelected, Newton resumed practicing law and also engaged in agricultural pursuits. He was president of the Virginia Agricultural Society in 1852. He delivered an important and strongly pro-slavery and pro-secession speech before the literary societies of the Virginia Military Institute in 1858. Newton returned to the House of Delegates in 1861, serving until 1863.

U.S. House of Representatives
Preceded by Henry A. Wise	Member of the U.S. House of Representatives from Virginia's 8th congressional district March 4, 1843–March 3, 1845	Succeeded by Robert M. T. Hunter
