= James B. Hunt =

American politician

James Bennett Hunt

Member of the U.S. House of Representatives from Michigan's 3rd district
- In office March 4, 1843 – March 3, 1847
- Preceded by: None
- Succeeded by: Kinsley S. Bingham

Personal details
- Born: August 13, 1799 Guyana
- Died: August 15, 1857 (aged 58) Washington, D.C., U.S.
- Party: Democratic

James Bennett Hunt (August 13, 1799 – August 15, 1857) was a politician and judge from the U.S. state of Michigan.

Hunt was born in Demerara, British Guiana (now Guyana). He moved with his father to New York City in 1803. There he later pursued an academic course, studied law, was admitted to the bar in 1824, and commenced practice in New York City. In 1836, he moved to Pontiac, Michigan and was appointed judge of the probate court. In March 1837, he was appointed commissioner of internal improvement by Governor Stevens T. Mason. He served as prosecuting attorney of Oakland County from 1841 to 1843.

In 1842, Hunt was elected as a Democrat to the 28th United States Congress, and was re-elected to the 29th Congress, serving from March 4, 1843 to March 3, 1847, the first person to represent Michigan's 3rd congressional district. He was appointed register of the land office at Sault Ste. Marie in January 1848 and served until June 1849. He returned to Pontiac and held the office of circuit court commissioner of Oakland County.

Hunt later moved to Washington, D.C. where he would die just two days after his 58th birthday. He was interred in Oak Hill Cemetery located in Pontiac, Michigan.

U.S. House of Representatives
Preceded by None	United States Representative for the 3rd congressional district of Michigan; 1843 – 1847	Succeeded by Kinsley S. Bingham
