= Laban Wheaton =

American politician (1754–1846)

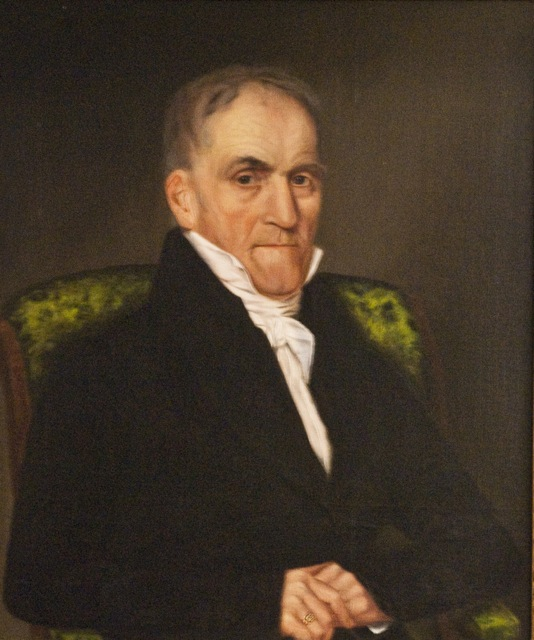

Member of the U.S. House of Representatives from Massachusetts
- In office March 4, 1809 – March 3, 1817
- Preceded by: Josiah Dean
- Succeeded by: Marcus Morton (10th)
- Constituency: 9th district (1809–15); 10th district (1815–17)

Chief Justice of the Court of Sessions for Bristol County
- In office May 25, 1819 – 1820
- Preceded by: Josiah Dean
- Succeeded by: Office Abolished

Chief Justice of The Court of Common Pleas of Bristol County
- In office May 18, 1810 – May 25, 1819

Member of the Massachusetts House of Representatives
- In office 1803-1808; 1825

Personal details
- Born: March 13, 1754 Mansfield, Province of Massachusetts Bay, British America
- Died: March 23, 1846 (aged 92) Norton, Massachusetts, U.S.
- Resting place: Norton Cemetery
- Party: Federalist
- Children: Laban M. Wheaton; Eliza Wheaton Strong
- Education: Harvard College
- Profession: Lawyer

Laban Wheaton (March 13, 1754 – March 23, 1846) was a U.S. representative from Massachusetts.

== Early life and education ==
Born in Mansfield in the Province of Massachusetts Bay, Wheaton attended Wrentham Academy. He was graduated from Harvard College in 1774. He studied theology under a private instructor at Woodstock, Connecticut. He also studied law.

Wheaton was admitted to the bar in 1788 and commenced practice in Milton, Massachusetts.

== Member of the Massachusetts House of Representatives ==
Wheaton served as member of the Massachusetts House of Representatives in 1803–1808, and again in 1825.

== Judicial career ==
Wheaton served as judge of the Bristol County Court. He was appointed chief justice of the court of common pleas of Bristol County May 18, 1810, which position he held until appointed chief justice of the court of sessions for Bristol County on May 25, 1819, but this court was abolished in 1820.

== Election to congress ==
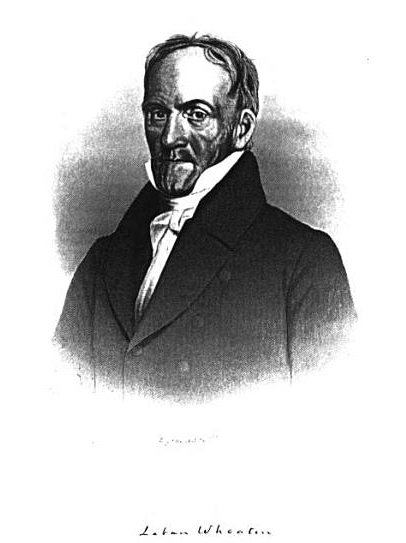

Wheaton was elected as a Federalist to the Eleventh and to the three succeeding Congresses (March 4, 1809 – March 3, 1817).

In 1834 Wheaton established the Wheaton Female Seminary (now Wheaton College in Norton, Massachusetts) as a memorial to his recently deceased daughter, Eliza Wheaton Strong.

== Death and burial ==
Wheaton died in Norton, Massachusetts, on March 23, 1846, at the age of 92. He was interred in Norton Cemetery.

== Notes ==
U.S. House of Representatives
Preceded by Josiah Dean	Member of the U.S. House of Representatives from Massachusetts's 9th congressional district March 4, 1809 – March 3, 1815	Succeeded by John Reed, Jr.
Preceded by Elijah Brigham	Member of the U.S. House of Representatives from Massachusetts's 10th congressional district March 3, 1815 – 1817	Succeeded by Marcus Morton
Legal offices
Preceded by	Judge of the Bristol County Court	Succeeded by
Preceded by	Chief Justice of the Court of Common Pleas of Bristol County; May 18, 1810 – May 25, 1819	Succeeded by
Preceded by Josiah Dean	Chief Justice of the Court of Sessions for Bristol County; May 25, 1819 – 1820	Succeeded by Office Abolished
