= Ely Warner =

American politician

- Born: May 24, 1785; Chester, Connecticut, U.S.
- Died: October 23, 1872 (aged 87)
- Occupations: Lawyer, jurist, politician

Ely Warner (May 24, 1785 – October 23, 1872) was an American lawyer, politician, and jurist.

== Early life and education ==
Warner, son of Jonathan and Hephzibah (Ely) Warner, was born in Chester (then a parish in Saybrook), Connecticut. He graduated from Yale College in 1807. After graduation, he taught school for a year or more, and then entered the Law School at Litchfield, Connecticut, and was admitted to the bar at Middletown about 1811. Warner wrote from his own stenographic notes the entire course of lectures, making three manuscript volumes, said to be the only correct copy of the lectures of Judges Reeve and Gould now extant.

== Career ==
Settling in Haddam in 1816, Warner afterwards represented that town in the Connecticut State Legislature tor two sessions, in 1825 and 1831. In 1828 he was appointed chief judge of the Middlesex County Court, and was re-appointed for several terms. Subsequently he became cashier of the East Haddam Bank, but removed to Chester in 1837, where his farm was situated, and where he resided during the remainder of his life. In 1855 he was appointed county commissioner, and held office for two terms. He was also for more than fifty years actively engaged as county surveyor.

== Personal life ==
Judge Warner was married, November 11, 1817, to Sarah Ward Warner, eldest daughter of John Warner, of Chester, who survived him. Of their eight children, three sons and three daughters survived him. He died of paralysis, at his residence in Chester, October 23, 1872, in his 88th year, being at that time the oldest lawyer in the State. His son George Washington Warner was a musician in the 24th Connecticut Volunteers during the American Civil War.
