= Samuel Simons =

American politician (1792–1847)

Member of the U.S. House of Representatives from Connecticut's 4th district
- In office March 4, 1843 – March 3, 1845
- Preceded by: Thomas Burr Osborne
- Succeeded by: Truman Smith

Member of the Connecticut House of Representatives
- In office 1830–

Personal details
- Born: 1792 Bridgeport, Connecticut, US
- Died: January 13, 1847 (aged 54–55) Bridgeport, Connecticut, US
- Resting place: Mountain Grove Cemetery
- Party: Democratic
- Occupation: teacher, physician

Samuel Simons (1792 – January 13, 1847) was a Democratic member of the United States House of Representatives from Connecticut's 4th congressional district from 1843 to 1845. He was a member of the Connecticut House of Representatives in 1830.

== Early life ==
He was born in Bridgeport, Connecticut, where he pursued an academic course of study. He held several local offices and also taught in school. He studied medicine and commenced practice in Bridgeport, Connecticut.

== Political career ==
Simons was a member of the Connecticut House of Representatives in 1830. In addition, he was the director of the Housatonic Railroad and a trustee of the Bridgeport Savings Bank. He served in the Twenty-eighth Congress from March 4, 1843, to March 3, 1845, and served as chairman of the Committee on Engraving. After leaving Congress, he resumed the practice of medicine in Bridgeport, Connecticut, where he died in 1847. He was buried in Mountain Grove Cemetery.

U.S. House of Representatives
Preceded by Thomas Burr Osborne	Member of the U.S. House of Representatives from Connecticut's 4th congressional district March 4, 1843 – March 3, 1845	Succeeded by Truman Smith
Connecticut House of Representatives
Preceded by.	Member of the Connecticut House of Representatives; 1830	Succeeded by.
