= Edwin Lawrence (Michigan jurist) =

American judge

Edwin Lawrence (February 28, 1808 – June 26, 1885) was an American jurist and politician.

Born in Middlebury, Vermont, Lawrence graduated from Middlebury College in 1829 and practiced law in Middlebury, Vermont from 1834 to 1836. He lived in Ann Arbor, Michigan, from 1836 until his death in 1885, practiced law. and was the editor of the Michigan State Journal between 1836 and 1840. In 1848, Lawrence was a Whig candidate for Congress. In 1848, Lawrence served in the Michigan House of Representatives. From 1857 to 1869, Lawrence was a Michigan circuit court judge. In 1857, Lawrence served briefly on the Michigan Supreme Court. Lawrence died of a stroke in Ann Arbor, Michigan.
