= Joseph W. Mansur =

American politician

Joseph Warren Mansur (December 7, 1808 – February 4, 1892) was an American lawyer, politician, and investor. He represented Lowell, Massachusetts in the Massachusetts House of Representatives in 1837, and in 1852 represented Fitchburg. He served in the Massachusetts Senate representing Middlesex in 1840 and Worcester District in 1854. He later moved to Michigan where he owned and edited the Kalamazoo Gazette in 1862-65.

Mansur was born in Pembroke, New Hampshire, the son of Aaron Mansur and Rebecca Warren. He studied at Phillips Academy and graduated from Harvard College and Law School in 1831. He later settled in Fitchburg, Massachusetts, where he owned a textile mill, and served as director in two local companies and as Postmaster (1859- Sept. 1861). He married Anna Stewart Fitzpatrick, an Irish immigrant, and they had five children, of whom three survived to adulthood.

In addition to his terms in the state legislature, Mansur also held local office, ran unsuccessfully for US Congress in 1842, and ran unsuccessfully for statewide office on the Democratic ticket in 1860. Mansur's eulogy of Daniel Webster (who died in 1852) won him note.

In the early 1860s Mansur moved to Michigan, and in November 1862 bought the Kalamazoo Gazette. He sold the paper some time after April 1865.

Mansur later lived in Sandwich, Ontario and Lennoxville, Quebec, before returning to Massachusetts where he lived in Duxbury and Milton. He died in Milton in February 1892.
