= List of United States representatives in the 30th Congress =

This is a complete list of United States representatives during the 30th United States Congress listed by seniority.

As an historical article, the districts and party affiliations listed reflect those during the 30th Congress (March 4, 1847 – March 3, 1849). Seats and party affiliations on similar lists for other congresses will be different for certain members.

Seniority depends on the date on which members were sworn into office. Since many members are sworn in on the same day, subsequent ranking is based on previous congressional service of the individual and then by alphabetical order by the last name of the representative.

Committee chairmanship in the House is often associated with seniority. However, party leadership is typically not associated with seniority.

Note: The "*" indicates that the representative/delegate may have served one or more non-consecutive terms while in the House of Representatives of the United States Congress.

== U.S. House seniority list ==
U.S. House seniority
Rank	Representative	Party	District	Seniority date (Previous service, if any)	No.# of term(s)	Notes
1	John Quincy Adams	W	MA-08	March 4, 1831	9th term	Dean of the House; Died on February 23, 1848.
2	James Iver McKay	D	NC-07	March 4, 1831	9th term	Dean of the House after Adams died. Left the House in 1849.
3	Robert Rhett	D	SC-07	March 4, 1837	6th term	Left the House in 1849.
4	Linn Boyd	D	KY-01	March 4, 1839; Previous service, 1835–1837.	6th term*	
5	Isaac E. Holmes	D	SC-06	March 4, 1839	5th term	
6	Jacob Thompson	D	MS-01	March 4, 1839	5th term	
7	John Reeves Jones Daniel	D	NC-06	March 4, 1841	4th term	
8	George S. Houston	D	AL-05	March 4, 1841	4th term	Left the House in 1849.
9	Charles J. Ingersoll	D	PA-04	March 4, 1841; Previous service, 1813–1815.	5th term*	Left the House in 1849.
10	Charles Hudson	W	MA-05	May 3, 1841	4th term	Left the House in 1849.
11	Joseph R. Ingersoll	W	PA-02	October 12, 1841; Previous service, 1835–1837.	5th term*	Left the House in 1849.
12	Robert C. Winthrop	W	MA-01	November 29, 1842; Previous service, 1840–1842.	6th term*	Speaker of the House
13	Joshua R. Giddings	W	OH-20	December 5, 1842; Previous service, 1838–1842.	7th term*	
14	Amos Abbott	W	MA-03	March 4, 1843	3rd term	Left the House in 1849.
15	Archibald Atkinson	D	VA-01	March 4, 1843	3rd term	Left the House in 1849.
16	Daniel Moreau Barringer	W	NC-03	March 4, 1843	3rd term	Left the House in 1849.
17	James A. Black	D	SC-01	March 4, 1843	3rd term	Died on April 3, 1848.
18	James B. Bowlin	D	MO-01	March 4, 1843	3rd term	
19	Richard Brodhead	D	PA-10	March 4, 1843	3rd term	Left the House in 1849.
20	Armistead Burt	D	SC-05	March 4, 1843	3rd term	
21	Howell Cobb	D	GA-06	March 4, 1843	3rd term	
22	Jacob Collamer	W	VT-02	March 4, 1843	3rd term	Left the House in 1849.
23	George Dromgoole	D	VA-02	March 4, 1843; Previous service, 1835–1841.	6th term*	Died on April 27, 1847.
24	Orlando B. Ficklin	D	IL-03	March 4, 1843	3rd term	Left the House in 1849.
25	Hugh A. Haralson	D	GA-04	March 4, 1843	3rd term	
26	Thomas J. Henley	D	IN-02	March 4, 1843	3rd term	Left the House in 1849.
27	Washington Hunt	W	NY-34	March 4, 1843	3rd term	Left the House in 1849.
28	Andrew Johnson	D	TN-01	March 4, 1843	3rd term	
29	George W. Jones	D	TN-05	March 4, 1843	3rd term	
30	Daniel P. King	W	MA-02	March 4, 1843	3rd term	
31	John H. Lumpkin	D	GA-05	March 4, 1843	3rd term	Left the House in 1849.
32	William B. Maclay	D	NY-04	March 4, 1843	3rd term	Left the House in 1849.
33	George P. Marsh	W	VT-03	March 4, 1843	3rd term	
34	Robert McClelland	D	MI-01	March 4, 1843	3rd term	Left the House in 1849.
35	John A. McClernand	D	IL-02	March 4, 1843	3rd term	
36	Abraham R. McIlvaine	W	PA-07	March 4, 1843	3rd term	Left the House in 1849.
37	John Pettit	D	IN-08	March 4, 1843	3rd term	Left the House in 1849.
38	Julius Rockwell	W	MA-07	March 4, 1843	3rd term	
39	Robert C. Schenck	W	OH-03	March 4, 1843	3rd term	
40	Richard F. Simpson	D	SC-02	March 4, 1843	3rd term	Left the House in 1849.
41	Caleb B. Smith	W	IN-04	March 4, 1843	3rd term	Left the House in 1849.
42	Robert Smith	D	IL-01	March 4, 1843	3rd term	Left the House in 1849.
43	Andrew Stewart	W	PA-18	March 4, 1843; Previous service, 1821–1829 and 1831–1835.	9th term**	Left the House in 1849.
44	Samuel Finley Vinton	W	OH-12	March 4, 1843; Previous service, 1823–1837.	10th term*	
45	John Wentworth	D	IL-04	March 4, 1843	3rd term	
46	Joseph A. Woodward	D	SC-03	March 4, 1843	3rd term	
47	Alexander H. Stephens	W	GA-07	October 2, 1843	3rd term	
48	Joseph Grinnell	W	MA-10	December 7, 1843	3rd term	
49	James Pollock	W	PA-13	April 5, 1844	3rd term	Left the House in 1849.
50	Thomas H. Bayly	D	VA-07	May 6, 1844	3rd term	
51	Isaac E. Morse	D	LA-04	December 2, 1844	3rd term	
52	George Ashmun	W	MA-06	March 4, 1845	2nd term	
53	Henry Bedinger	D	VA-10	March 4, 1845	2nd term	Left the House in 1849.
54	John Blanchard	W	PA-17	March 4, 1845	2nd term	Left the House in 1849.
55	William G. Brown, Sr.	D	VA-15	March 4, 1845	2nd term	Left the House in 1849.
56	Charles W. Cathcart	D	IN-09	March 4, 1845	2nd term	Left the House in 1849.
57	John G. Chapman	W	MD-01	March 4, 1845	2nd term	Left the House in 1849.
58	Lucien Bonaparte Chase	D	TN-09	March 4, 1845	2nd term	Left the House in 1849.
59	William M. Cocke	W	TN-02	March 4, 1845	2nd term	Left the House in 1849.
60	John H. Crozier	W	TN-03	March 4, 1845	2nd term	Left the House in 1849.
61	John D. Cummins	D	OH-16	March 4, 1845	2nd term	Left the House in 1849.
62	James Dixon	W	CT-01	March 4, 1845	2nd term	Left the House in 1849.
63	Joseph E. Edsall	D	NJ-03	March 4, 1845	2nd term	Left the House in 1849.
64	James J. Faran	D	OH-01	March 4, 1845	2nd term	Left the House in 1849.
65	George Fries	D	OH-17	March 4, 1845	2nd term	Left the House in 1849.
66	Meredith P. Gentry	W	TN-07	March 4, 1845; Previous service, 1839–1843.	4th term*	
67	Artemas Hale	W	MA-09	March 4, 1845	2nd term	Left the House in 1849.
68	James G. Hampton	W	NJ-01	March 4, 1845	2nd term	Left the House in 1849.
69	Henry W. Hilliard	W	AL-02	March 4, 1845	2nd term	
70	Elias B. Holmes	W	NY-28	March 4, 1845	2nd term	Left the House in 1849.
71	John W. Houston	W	DE	March 4, 1845	2nd term	
72	Samuel D. Hubbard	W	CT-02	March 4, 1845	2nd term	Left the House in 1849.
73	Timothy Jenkins	D	NY-20	March 4, 1845	2nd term	Left the House in 1849.
74	James H. Johnson	D	NH-04	March 4, 1845	2nd term	Left the House in 1849.
75	Thomas B. King	W	GA-01	March 4, 1845; Previous service, 1839–1843.	4th term*	
76	Lewis C. Levin	W	PA-01	March 4, 1845	2nd term	
77	Thomas W. Ligon	D	MD-03	March 4, 1845	2nd term	Left the House in 1849.
78	John Pendleton	W	VA-09	March 4, 1845	2nd term	Left the House in 1849.
79	John S. Phelps	D	MO-05	March 4, 1845	2nd term	
80	John A. Rockwell	W	CT-03	March 4, 1845	2nd term	Left the House in 1849.
81	Joseph M. Root	W	OH-21	March 4, 1845	2nd term	
82	William Sawyer	D	OH-05	March 4, 1845	2nd term	Left the House in 1849.
83	Truman Smith	W	CT-04	March 4, 1845; Previous service, 1839–1843.	4th term*	Left the House in 1849.
84	Alexander D. Sims	D	SC-04	March 4, 1845	2nd term	Died on November 22, 1848.
85	Frederick P. Stanton	D	TN-10	March 4, 1845	2nd term	
86	John Strohm	W	PA-08	March 4, 1845	2nd term	Left the House in 1849.
87	Bannon Goforth Thibodeaux	W	LA-02	March 4, 1845	2nd term	Left the House in 1849.
88	James Thompson	D	PA-23	March 4, 1845	2nd term	
89	Robert Toombs	W	GA-08	March 4, 1845	2nd term	
90	Hugh White	W	NY-16	March 4, 1845	2nd term	
91	William W. Wick	D	IN-05	March 4, 1845; Previous service, 1839–1841.	3rd term*	Left the House in 1849.
92	Hezekiah Williams	D	ME-07	March 4, 1845	2nd term	Left the House in 1849.
93	David Wilmot	D	PA-12	March 4, 1845	2nd term	
94	John H. Harmanson	D	LA-03	December 1, 1845	2nd term	
95	Emile La Sére	D	LA-01	January 29, 1846	2nd term	
96	James McDowell	D	VA-11	March 6, 1846	2nd term	
97	David S. Kaufman	D	TX-01	March 30, 1846	2nd term	
98	Timothy Pilsbury	D	TX-02	March 30, 1846	2nd term	Left the House in 1849.
99	Franklin Welsh Bowdon	D	AL-07	December 7, 1846	2nd term	
100	Shepherd Leffler	D	IA-02	December 29, 1846	2nd term	
101	Green Adams	W	KY-06	March 4, 1847	1st term	Left the House in 1849.
102	Washington Barrow	W	TN-08	March 4, 1847	1st term	Left the House in 1849.
103	Richard L. T. Beale	D	VA-08	March 4, 1847	1st term	Left the House in 1849.
104	Hiram Belcher	W	ME-03	March 4, 1847	1st term	Left the House in 1849.
105	Kinsley S. Bingham	D	MI-03	March 4, 1847	1st term	
106	Ausburn Birdsall	D	NY-22	March 4, 1847	1st term	Left the House in 1849.
107	Thomas S. Bocock	D	VA-04	March 4, 1847	1st term	
108	John Botts	W	VA-06	March 4, 1847; Previous service, 1839–1843.	3rd term*	Left the House in 1849.
109	Nathaniel Boyden	W	NC-02	March 4, 1847	1st term	Left the House in 1849.
110	Edward Bradley	D	MI-02	March 4, 1847	1st term	Died on August 5, 1847.
111	Jasper E. Brady	W	PA-16	March 4, 1847	1st term	Left the House in 1849.
112	Albert G. Brown	D	MS-04	March 4, 1847; Previous service, 1839–1841.	2nd term*	
113	Charles Brown	D	PA-03	March 4, 1847; Previous service, 1841–1843.	2nd term*	Left the House in 1849.
114	Aylette Buckner	W	KY-04	March 4, 1847	1st term	Left the House in 1849.
115	Chester Pierce Butler	W	PA-11	March 4, 1847	1st term	
116	Edward C. Cabell	W	FL	March 4, 1847; Previous service, 1845–1846.	2nd term*	
117	Richard S. Canby	W	OH-04	March 4, 1847	1st term	Left the House in 1849.
118	Asa Clapp	D	ME-02	March 4, 1847	1st term	Left the House in 1849.
119	Franklin Clark	D	ME-04	March 4, 1847	1st term	Left the House in 1849.
120	Beverly L. Clarke	D	KY-02	March 4, 1847	1st term	Left the House in 1849.
121	Thomas L. Clingman	W	NC-01	March 4, 1847; Previous service, 1843–1845.	2nd term*	
122	Williamson R. W. Cobb	D	AL-06	March 4, 1847	1st term	
123	William Collins	D	NY-18	March 4, 1847	1st term	Left the House in 1849.
124	Harmon S. Conger	W	NY-25	March 4, 1847	1st term	
125	Robert B. Cranston	W	RI-01	March 4, 1847; Previous service, 1837–1843.	4th term*	Left the House in 1849.
126	John W. Crisfield	W	MD-06	March 4, 1847	1st term	Left the House in 1849.
127	John Crowell	W	OH-19	March 4, 1847	1st term	
128	John Dickey	W	PA-20	March 4, 1847; Previous service, 1843–1845.	2nd term*	Left the House in 1849.
129	Rodolphus Dickinson	D	OH-06	March 4, 1847	1st term	
130	Richard S. Donnell	W	NC-08	March 4, 1847	1st term	Left the House in 1849.
131	William Duer	W	NY-23	March 4, 1847	1st term	
132	Daniel Duncan	W	OH-10	March 4, 1847	1st term	Left the House in 1849.
133	Garnett Duncan	W	KY-07	March 4, 1847	1st term	Left the House in 1849.
134	George G. Dunn	W	IN-06	March 4, 1847	1st term	Left the House in 1849.
135	George N. Eckert	W	PA-14	March 4, 1847	1st term	Left the House in 1849.
136	Thomas O. Edwards	W	OH-09	March 4, 1847	1st term	Left the House in 1849.
137	Elisha Embree	W	IN-01	March 4, 1847	1st term	Left the House in 1849.
138	Alexander Evans	W	MD-05	March 4, 1847	1st term	
139	Nathan Evans	W	OH-14	March 4, 1847	1st term	
140	John W. Farrelly	W	PA-22	March 4, 1847	1st term	Left the House in 1849.
141	Winfield S. Featherston	D	MS-02	March 4, 1847	1st term	
142	David Fisher	W	OH-02	March 4, 1847	1st term	Left the House in 1849.
143	Thomas Flournoy	D	VA-03	March 4, 1847	1st term	Left the House in 1849.
144	John Freedley	W	PA-05	March 4, 1847	1st term	
145	Richard French	D	KY-09	March 4, 1847; Previous service, 1835–1837 and 1843–1845.	3rd term**	Left the House in 1849.
146	Andrew S. Fulton	W	VA-13	March 4, 1847	1st term	Left the House in 1849.
147	John P. Gaines	W	KY-10	March 4, 1847	1st term	Left the House in 1849.
148	John Gayle	W	AL-01	March 4, 1847	1st term	Left the House in 1849.
149	William L. Goggin	W	VA-05	March 4, 1847; Previous service, 1839–1843 and 1844–1845.	4th term**	Left the House in 1849.
150	Daniel Gott	W	NY-24	March 4, 1847	1st term	
151	James S. Green	D	MO-03	March 4, 1847	1st term	
152	Dudley S. Gregory	W	NJ-05	March 4, 1847	1st term	Left the House in 1849.
153	Nathan K. Hall	W	NY-32	March 4, 1847	1st term	Left the House in 1849.
154	Willard Preble Hall	D	MO-04	March 4, 1847	1st term	
155	David Hammons	D	ME-01	March 4, 1847	1st term	Left the House in 1849.
156	Moses Hampton	W	PA-21	March 4, 1847	1st term	
157	Sampson W. Harris	D	AL-03	March 4, 1847	1st term	
158	William Henry	W	VT-01	March 4, 1847	1st term	
159	Hugh Lawson White Hill	D	TN-04	March 4, 1847	1st term	Left the House in 1849.
160	William T. Haskell	W	TN-11	March 4, 1847	1st term	Left the House in 1849.
161	John M. Holley	W	NY-27	March 4, 1847	1st term	Died on March 8, 1848.
162	John W. Hornbeck	W	PA-06	March 4, 1847	1st term	Died on January 16, 1848.
163	Samuel W. Inge	D	AL-04	March 4, 1847	1st term	
164	Alexander Irvin	W	PA-24	March 4, 1847	1st term	Left the House in 1849.
165	Alfred Iverson, Sr.	D	GA-02	March 4, 1847	1st term	Left the House in 1849.
166	David S. Jackson	D	NY-06	March 4, 1847	1st term	Resigned on April 19, 1848.
167	John Jameson	D	MO-02	March 4, 1847; Previous service, 1839–1841 and 1843–1845.	3rd term**	Left the House in 1849.
168	Daniel B. St. John	W	NY-09	March 4, 1847	1st term	Left the House in 1849.
169	Robert W. Johnson	D	AR	March 4, 1847	1st term	
170	John W. Jones	W	GA-03	March 4, 1847	1st term	Left the House in 1849.
171	Orlando Kellogg	W	NY-14	March 4, 1847	1st term	Left the House in 1849.
172	William Kennon, Jr.	D	OH-15	March 4, 1847	1st term	Left the House in 1849.
173	Samuel Lahm	D	OH-18	March 4, 1847	1st term	Left the House in 1849.
174	Sidney Lawrence	D	NY-15	March 4, 1847	1st term	Left the House in 1849.
175	William T. Lawrence	W	NY-26	March 4, 1847	1st term	Left the House in 1849.
176	Abraham Lincoln	W	IL-07	March 4, 1847	1st term	Left the House in 1849.
177	Frederick W. Lord	D	NY-01	March 4, 1847	1st term	Left the House in 1849.
178	Job Mann	D	PA-19	March 4, 1847; Previous service, 1835–1837.	2nd term*	
179	Dudley Marvin	W	NY-31	March 4, 1847; Previous service, 1823–1829.	4th term*	Left the House in 1849.
180	Robert M. McLane	D	MD-04	March 4, 1847	1st term	
181	John K. Miller	D	OH-11	March 4, 1847	1st term	
182	Charles S. Morehead	W	KY-08	March 4, 1847	1st term	
183	Jonathan D. Morris	D	OH-07	March 4, 1847	1st term	
184	Joseph Mullin	W	NY-19	March 4, 1847	1st term	Left the House in 1849.
185	Henry C. Murphy	D	NY-02	March 4, 1847; Previous service, 1843–1845.	2nd term*	Left the House in 1849.
186	William Nelson	W	NY-07	March 4, 1847	1st term	
187	Henry Nes	W	PA-15	March 4, 1847; Previous service, 1843–1845.	2nd term*	
188	William A. Newell	W	NJ-02	March 4, 1847	1st term	
189	Henry Nicoll	D	NY-03	March 4, 1847	1st term	Left the House in 1849.
190	David Outlaw	W	NC-09	March 4, 1847	1st term	
191	John G. Palfrey	W	MA-04	March 4, 1847	1st term	Left the House in 1849.
192	Charles H. Peaslee	D	NH-02	March 4, 1847	1st term	
193	Lucius B. Peck	D	VT-04	March 4, 1847	1st term	
194	George Petrie	D	NY-17	March 4, 1847	1st term	Left the House in 1849.
195	Samuel Peyton	D	KY-03	March 4, 1847	1st term	Left the House in 1849.
196	Harvey Putnam	W	NY-33	March 4, 1847; Previous service, 1838–1839.	2nd term*	
197	Gideon Reynolds	W	NY-12	March 4, 1847	1st term	
198	Thomas Ritchey	D	OH-13	March 4, 1847	1st term	Left the House in 1849.
199	John L. Robinson	D	IN-03	March 4, 1847	1st term	
200	William R. Rockhill	D	IN-10	March 4, 1847	1st term	Left the House in 1849.
201	James D. Roman	W	MD-02	March 4, 1847	1st term	Left the House in 1849.
202	Robert L. Rose	W	NY-29	March 4, 1847	1st term	
203	David Rumsey	W	NY-30	March 4, 1847	1st term	
204	Augustine Henry Shepperd	W	NC-04	March 4, 1847; Previous service, 1827–1839 and 1841–1843.	8th term**	
205	Eliakim Sherrill	W	NY-10	March 4, 1847	1st term	Left the House in 1849.
206	Peter H. Silvester	W	NY-11	March 4, 1847	1st term	
207	John I. Slingerland	W	NY-13	March 4, 1847	1st term	Left the House in 1849.
208	Ephraim K. Smart	D	ME-05	March 4, 1847	1st term	Left the House in 1849.
209	George A. Starkweather	D	NY-21	March 4, 1847	1st term	Left the House in 1849.
210	William Strong	D	PA-09	March 4, 1847	1st term	
211	Frederick A. Tallmadge	W	NY-05	March 4, 1847	1st term	Left the House in 1849.
212	John L. Taylor	W	OH-08	March 4, 1847	1st term	
213	James Houston Thomas	D	TN-06	March 4, 1847	1st term	
214	John B. Thompson	W	KY-05	March 4, 1847	1st term	
215	Richard W. Thompson	W	IN-07	March 4, 1847; Previous service, 1841–1843.	2nd term*	Left the House in 1849.
216	Robert A. Thompson	D	VA-14	March 4, 1847	1st term	Left the House in 1849.
217	William Thompson	D	IA-01	March 4, 1847	1st term	
218	Benjamin Babock Thurston	D	RI-02	March 4, 1847	1st term	Left the House in 1849.
219	Patrick W. Tompkins	W	MS-03	March 4, 1847	1st term	Left the House in 1849.
220	Amos Tuck	W	NH-01	March 4, 1847	1st term	
221	Thomas J. Turner	D	IL-06	March 4, 1847	1st term	Left the House in 1849.
222	Abraham W. Venable	D	NC-05	March 4, 1847	1st term	
223	John Van Dyke	W	NJ-04	March 4, 1847	1st term	
224	Cornelius Warren	W	NY-08	March 4, 1847	1st term	Left the House in 1849.
225	James S. Wiley	D	ME-06	March 4, 1847	1st term	Left the House in 1849.
226	James Wilson II	W	NH-03	March 4, 1847	1st term	
	Richard K. Meade	D	VA-02	August 5, 1847	1st term	
	William B. Preston	W	VA-12	November 25, 1847	1st term	Left the House in 1849.
	William A. Richardson	D	IL-05	December 6, 1847	1st term	
	Charles E. Stuart	D	MI-02	December 6, 1847	1st term	Left the House in 1849.
	Samuel A. Bridges	D	PA-06	March 6, 1848	1st term	Left the House in 1849.
	Horace Mann	W	MA-08	April 3, 1848	1st term	
	Mason C. Darling	D	WI-02	June 8, 1848	1st term	Left the House in 1849.
	William Pitt Lynde	D	WI-01	June 8, 1848	1st term	Left the House in 1849.
	Daniel Wallace	D	SC-01	June 12, 1848	1st term	
	Esbon Blackmar	W	NY-27	December 4, 1848	1st term	Left the House in 1849.
	Horace Greeley	W	NY-06	December 4, 1848	1st term	Left the House in 1849.
	John McQueen	D	SC-04	February 12, 1849	1st term	

== Delegates ==
Rank	Delegate	Party	District	Seniority date (Previous service, if any)	No.# of term(s)	Notes
1	John Hubbard Tweedy	W	WI	March 4, 1847	1st term	
	Henry Hastings Sibley	D	WI	October 30, 1848	1st term	

== See also ==
- 30th United States Congress
- List of United States congressional districts
- List of United States senators in the 30th Congress
