= Francis A. Cunningham =

American politician

Member of the U.S. House of Representatives from Ohio's 2nd district
- In office March 4, 1845 – March 3, 1847
- Preceded by: John B. Weller
- Succeeded by: David Fisher

Personal details
- Born: Francis Alanson Cunningham; November 9, 1804 Abbeville County, South Carolina
- Died: August 16, 1864 (aged 59) Eaton, Ohio
- Resting place: Mound Hill Cemetery
- Party: Democratic

Francis Alanson Cunningham (November 9, 1804 – August 16, 1864) was a 19th-century physician, lawyer, and politician who served as a U.S. representative from Ohio for one term from 1845 to 1847.

== Biography ==
Born in Abbeville County, South Carolina, Cunningham moved to Eaton, Ohio, in 1826. He taught school. He studied medicine and commenced practice in 1829. He served as clerk of the court of Preble County in 1833.

=== Congress ===
Cunningham was elected as a Democrat to the Twenty-ninth Congress (March 4, 1845 – March 3, 1847). He was an unsuccessful candidate for reelection in 1846 to the Thirtieth Congress.

=== Later career ===
He studied law and was admitted to the bar in 1847 and began practice in Eaton. He was appointed additional paymaster of Volunteers by President Polk December 30, 1847. He was commissioned paymaster in the Regular Army March 2, 1849, and was retired from active service August 27, 1863.

== Death ==
He died in Eaton, Ohio, August 16, 1864. He was interred in Mound Hill Cemetery.

U.S. House of Representatives
Preceded by John B. Weller	Member of the U.S. House of Representatives from Ohio's 2nd congressional district 1845-1847	Succeeded by David Fisher
