= List of United States senators in the 30th Congress =

This is a complete list of United States senators during the 30th United States Congress listed by seniority from March 4, 1847, to March 3, 1849.

Order of service is based on the commencement of the senator's first term. Behind this is former service as a senator (only giving the senator seniority within their new incoming class), service as vice president, a House member, a cabinet secretary, or a governor of a state. The final factor is the population of the senator's state.

Senators who were sworn in during the middle of the two-year congressional term (up until the last senator who was not sworn in early after winning the November 1848 election) are listed at the end of the list with no number.

== Terms of service ==
Class	Terms of service of senators that expired in years
Class 3	Terms of service of senators that expired in 1849 (AL, AR, CT, FL, GA, IA, IL, IN, KY, LA, MD, MO, NC, NH, NY, OH, PA, SC, VT, and WI.)
Class 1	Terms of service of senators that expired in 1851 (CT, DE, FL, IN, MA, MD, ME, MI, MN, MO, MS, NJ, NY, OH, PA, RI, TN, TX, VA, VT, and WI.)
Class 2	Terms of service of senators that expired in 1853 (AL, AR, DE, GA, IA, IL, KY, LA, MA, ME, MI, MS, NC, NH, NJ, RI, SC, TN, TX, and VA.)

== U.S. Senate seniority list ==
U.S. Senate seniority
Rank	Senator (party-state)	Seniority date	Other factors
1	Thomas Hart Benton (D-MO)	August 10, 1821	
2	Ambrose Hundley Sevier (D-AR)	September 18, 1836	
3	William Allen (D-OH)	March 4, 1837	
4	Samuel Shethar Phelps (W-VT)	March 4, 1839	
5	Daniel Sturgeon (D-PA)	January 14, 1840	
6	Jabez Williams Huntington (W-CT)	May 4, 1840	
7	Willie Person Mangum (W-NC)	November 25, 1840	
10	John Macpherson Berrien (W-GA)	March 4, 1841	Former senator (4 years)
11	Jacob Welsh Miller (W-NJ)	March 4, 1841	New Jersey 14th in population (1830)
12	Arthur Pendleton Bagby (D-AL)	November 24, 1841	
13	John Jordan Crittenden (W-KY)	March 31, 1842	
14	William Lewis Dayton (W-NJ)	July 2, 1842	
15	James Alfred Pearce (W-MD)	March 4, 1843	Former representative (6 years); Maryland 15th in population (1840)
16	Charles Gordon Atherton (D-NH)	March 4, 1843	Former representative (6 years); New Hampshire 22nd in population (1840)
17	Edward Allen Hannegan (D-IN)	March 4, 1843	Former representative (4 years)
18	Walter Terry Colquitt (D-GA)	March 4, 1843	Former representative (1 year)
19	Sidney Breese (D-IL)	March 4, 1843	Illinois 14th in population (1840)
20	William Upham (W-VT)	March 4, 1843	Vermont 21st in population (1840)
21	David Rice Atchison (D-MO)	October 14, 1843	
22	John Fairfield (W-ME)	December 4, 1843	Maine 13th in population (1840)
23	Henry Johnson (W-LA)	February 12, 1844	
24	Dixon Hall Lewis (D-AL)	April 22, 1844	
25	John Milton Niles (D-CT)	May 16, 1844	
26	Chester Ashley (D-AR)	November 8, 1844	
27	Daniel Stevens Dickinson (D-NY)	November 30, 1844	
28	John Adams Dix (D-NY)	January 27, 1845	
29	Daniel Webster (W-MA)	March 4, 1845	Former senator (13 years)
30	John Middleton Clayton (W-DE)	March 4, 1845	Former senator (7 years)
31	Thomas Corwin (W-OH)	March 4, 1845	Former representative (9 years)
32	Jesse Speight (D-MS)	March 4, 1845	Former representative (8 years)
33	Hopkins Lacy Turney (D-TN)	March 4, 1845	Former representative (6 years)
34	Lewis Cass (D-MI)	March 4, 1845	Former cabinet member
35	Jesse D. Bright (D-IN)	March 4, 1845	Indiana 10th in population (1840)
36	Reverdy Johnson (W-MD)	March 4, 1845	Maryland 15th in population (1840)
37	Albert Collins Greene (W-RI)	March 4, 1845	Rhode Island 24th in population (1840)
38	Simon Cameron (D-PA)	March 13, 1845	
39	John Davis (W-MA)	March 24, 1845	
40	David Levy Yulee (D-FL)	July 1, 1845	Former delegate
41	John Caldwell Calhoun (D-SC)	November 26, 1845	
42	Thomas Jefferson Rusk (D-TX)	February 21, 1846	
43	Samuel Houston (D-TX)	February 26, 1846	Former representative
44	George Edmund Badger (W-NC)	November 25, 1846	
45	Andrew Pickens Butler (D-SC)	December 4, 1846	
46	James M. Mason (D-VA)	January 21, 1847	Former representative
47	Robert M. T. Hunter (D-VA)	March 4, 1847	Former representative (8 years); Virginia 4th in population (1840)
48	Joseph Rogers Underwood (W-KY)	March 4, 1847	Former representative (8 years); Kentucky 6th in population (1840)
49	Stephen A. Douglas (D-IL)	March 4, 1847	Former representative (4 years)
50	John P. Hale (D-NH)	March 4, 1847	Former representative (2 years)
51	Alpheus Felch (D-MI)	March 4, 1847	Former governor
52	James Ware Bradbury (D-ME)	March 4, 1847	Maine 13th in population (1840)
53	Henry Stuart Foote (D-MS)	March 4, 1847	Mississippi 17th in population (1840)
54	Solomon Weathersbee Downs (D-LA)	March 4, 1847	Louisiana 19th in population (1840)
55	John Hopkins Clarke (W-RI)	March 4, 1847	Rhode Island 24th in population (1840)
56	Presley Spruance (W-DE)	March 4, 1847	Delaware 26th in population (1840)
	Jefferson Davis (D-MS)	August 10, 1847	
	Roger Sherman Baldwin (W-CT)	November 11, 1847	
	John Bell (W-TN)	November 22, 1847	
	Wyman Bradbury Seavy Moor (D-ME)	January 5, 1848	
	Herschel Vespasian Johnson (D-GA)	February 5, 1848	
	Solon Borland (D-AR)	March 30, 1848	
	William K. Sebastian (D-AR)	May 12, 1848	
	Hannibal Hamlin (D-ME)	June 8, 1848	Former representative (4 years); Maine 13th in population (1840)
	Henry Dodge (D-WI)	June 8, 1848	Former delegate (4 years); Wisconsin 28th in population (1840)
	Thomas Fitzgerald (D-MI)	June 8, 1848	
	Isaac Pigeon Walker (D-WI)	June 8, 1848	Wisconsin 28th in population (1840)
	Thomas Metcalfe (D-KY)	June 23, 1848	
	William Rufus de Vane King (D-AL)	July 1, 1848	
	Benjamin Fitzpatrick (D-AL)	November 25, 1848	
	Augustus Caesar Dodge (D-IA)	December 7, 1848	Former delegate (6 years)
	George Wallace Jones (D-IA)	December 7, 1848	Former delegate (3 years)
	John Wales (W-DE)	February 23, 1849	

== See also ==
- 30th United States Congress
- List of United States representatives in the 30th Congress
