= Alexander Sims =

Alexander Sims may refer to:

- Alexander D. Sims (1803–1848), U.S. Representative from South Carolina
- Alexander Sims (racing driver) (born 1988), British racing driver
