= Ninety-Six District, South Carolina =

American legislative district

Ninety-Six District is a former judicial district in the U.S. state of South Carolina. It existed as a district from July 29, 1769 to December 31, 1799. The court house and jail for Ninety-Six District were in Ninety Six.

== Colonial period ==
In the colonial period, the land around the coast was divided into parishes corresponding to the parishes of the Church of England. There were also several counties that had judicial and electoral functions. As people settled the backcountry, judicial districts and additional counties were organized. This structure continued and grew after the Revolutionary War. In 1798, all counties were re-identified as "elective districts" to be effective on January 1, 1800. In 1868, the districts were converted back to counties. The South Carolina Department of Archives and History has maps that show the boundaries of counties, districts, and parishes starting in 1682.

Ninety-Six District was created on July 29, 1769, as the most western of the seven original districts within the Province of South Carolina. Its boundaries included the current Abbeville, McCormick, Edgefield, Saluda, Greenwood, Laurens, Union, and Spartanburg counties; much of Cherokee and Newberry counties; and small parts of Aiken and Greenville counties.

The lands further west and on the other side of the Appalachian Mountains were still Cherokee homelands, which the British Crown had tried to protect from colonial encroachment by the Royal Proclamation of 1763. They continued to allow traders or travelers in the area. The westward expansion of the borders of the Province of North Carolina and the Colony of Virginia (then including present-day Kentucky) were confirmed by the 1770 Treaty of Lochaber with the Cherokee. Some 1000 Cherokee were hosted by Alexander Cameron at Lochabar Plantation in the Ninety-Six District. Due to poor surveying, Tryon County, North Carolina infringed on much of its northern boundaries through the 1770s.

== Divisions ==
As a result of the 1785 Act, districts in South Carolina were further subdivided into counties. These counties were responsible for maintaining court houses, as part of the larger judicial districts from which they were formed. The Ninety-Six District was given the counties of Abbeville, Edgefield, Laurens, Newberry, Spartanburg, and Union.

On February 19, 1791, the Ninety-Six District lost the land in the current Union, Spartanburg counties and the portion of Cherokee county within the district in the formation of Pinckney District.

== Disestablishment ==
On January 1, 1800, Ninety-Six District was abolished and replaced by the Abbeville, Edgefield, Greenville, Laurens, and Newberry Districts.

== Notable inhabitants ==
- James Augustus Black, (1793–1848), United States Congressman from South Carolina.
- Bloody Bill Cunningham, (Major William Cunningham) (1756 –1787), was an officer in the Loyalist Militia who conducted a bloody campaign in Ninety-Six District in the fall of 1781.

== Present day ==
The Old 96 District Tourism Commission was formed to promote tourism in five of the counties that were formed from the original district - Abbeville, Edgefield, Greenwood, Laurens, and McCormick.

== See also ==
- Ninety Six National Historic Site
- Siege of Ninety-Six
