= William W. Campbell (New York congressman) =

American judge

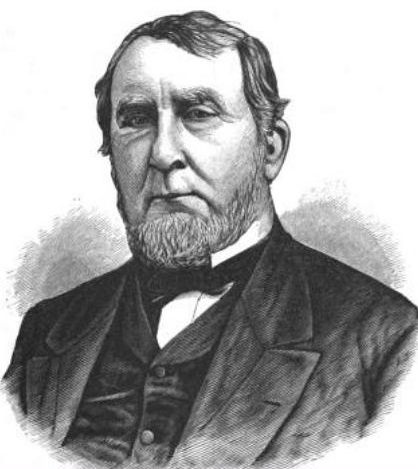

Member of the New York State Assembly
- In office 1869

Justice of the New York Supreme Court
- In office 1857-1865

Justice of the Superior court of New York City
- In office 1849-1855

Member of the U.S. House of Representatives from New York's 6th district
- In office March 4, 1845 – March 3, 1847
- Preceded by: Hamilton Fish
- Succeeded by: David S. Jackson

Personal details
- Born: June 10, 1806 Cherry Valley, New York, US
- Died: September 7, 1881 (aged 75) Cherry Valley, New York, US
- Party: Know Nothing
- Education: Union College
- Occupation: Lawyer

William Wallace Campbell (June 10, 1806 – September 7, 1881) was an American writer, historian, lawyer and politician from New York.

== Life ==
He was born in Cherry Valley, Otsego County, New York, the son of Judge James S. Campbell, and grandson of American Revolutionary War Colonel Samuel Campbell and Jane Campbell. He attended the common schools, and graduated from Union College in 1827. He studied law, was admitted to the bar in 1831, and commenced practice in New York City.

He was elected on the American ticket to the 29th United States Congress, holding office from March 4, 1845, to March 3, 1847.

He was a justice of the Superior Court of New York City from 1849 to 1855. He was a justice of the New York Supreme Court from 1857 to 1865, and ex officio a judge of the New York Court of Appeals in 1865.

He was a Republican member of the New York State Assembly (Otsego Co., 1st D.) in 1869.

He was an author and engaged in historical work. His works include:

- The Border Warfare of New York During the Revolution: The Annals of Tryon County. New York: Baker & Schribner, 1831. (Reprint, Bowie, Md.: Heritage Books, 1992.)
- An Historical Sketch of Robin Hood and Captain Kidd. New York: Scribner, 1853.
- The centennial celebration at Cherry Valley, Otsego Co. N.Y., July 4, 1840
- The addresses of William W. Campbell, esq. and Gov. W.H. Seward, with letters, toasts, &c., &c.

He died on September 7, 1881, in Cherry Valley, and was buried at the Cherry Valley Cemetery.

New York State Surveyor General William Campbell was his uncle.

== Sources ==
- United States Congress. "William W. Campbell (id: C000105)". Biographical Directory of the United States Congress.
- Obit of his brother John C. Campbell in NYT on March 27, 1890
- Obit of his son Douglas Campbell (1839-1893) in NYT on March 8, 1893 (giving middle initial "M.")
- Campbell genealogy at GeoCities
- Campbell genealogy at RootsWeb
- Political Graveyard (doubled entry)
- Nominated for Assembly again in NYT on October 28, 1873
- Cover of: The centennial celebration at Cherry Valley, Otsego Co. N.Y., July 4th, 1840 by The centennial celebration at Cherry Valley, Otsego Co. N.Y., July 4th, 1840

U.S. House of Representatives
Preceded by Hamilton Fish	Member of the U.S. House of Representatives from New York's 6th congressional district 1845–1847	Succeeded by David S. Jackson
New York State Assembly
Preceded by Myron J. Hubbard	New York State Assembly; Otsego County, 1st District; 1869	Succeeded by James Young
