= William A. Sackett =

American politician

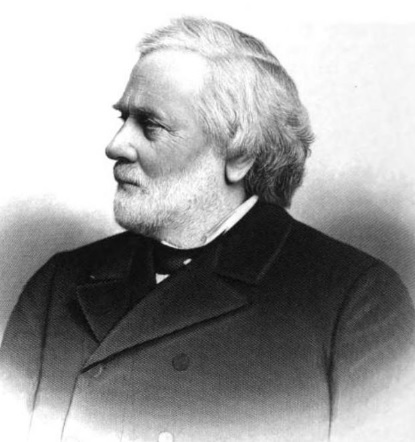

Member of the U.S. House of Representatives from New York's 27th district
- In office March 4, 1849 – March 3, 1853
- Preceded by: Esbon Blackmar
- Succeeded by: John J. Taylor

Personal details
- Born: William Augustus Sackett; November 18, 1811 Aurelius, New York, US
- Died: September 6, 1895 (aged 83) Saratoga Springs, New York, US
- Party: Whig; Republican

William Augustus Sackett (November 18, 1811 – September 6, 1895) was a U.S. representative from New York.

== Biography ==
Born in Aurelius, near Auburn, New York, Sackett attended private schools and Aurora Academy. He moved to Seneca Falls in 1831.

Sackett studied law, was admitted to the bar in 1834 and commenced practice in Seneca Falls.

He was elected as a Whig to the Thirty-first and Thirty-second Congresses (March 4, 1849 – March 3, 1853). Sackett spoke frequently against the extension of slavery into United States territories and advocated the immediate admission of California to the Union as a free state.

After leaving Congress he resumed the practice of law in Seneca Falls. He moved to Saratoga Springs in 1857.

During the American Civil War his son William H. Sackett (1838–1864) was Colonel and commander of the 9th New York Cavalry. The younger Sackett was killed at the Battle of Trevilian Station.

Sackett joined the Republican Party at its founding and was appointed a federal Register in Bankruptcy under the Bankruptcy Act of 1867. Afterwards, he was usually referred to as Judge Sackett to recognize the nature of his federal position.

He died in Saratoga Springs on September 6, 1895, and was interred in that town's Greenridge Cemetery.

U.S. House of Representatives
Preceded by Esbon Blackmar	Member of the U.S. House of Representatives from New York's 27th congressional district 1849–1853	Succeeded by John J. Taylor
