= William Henry Wallace =

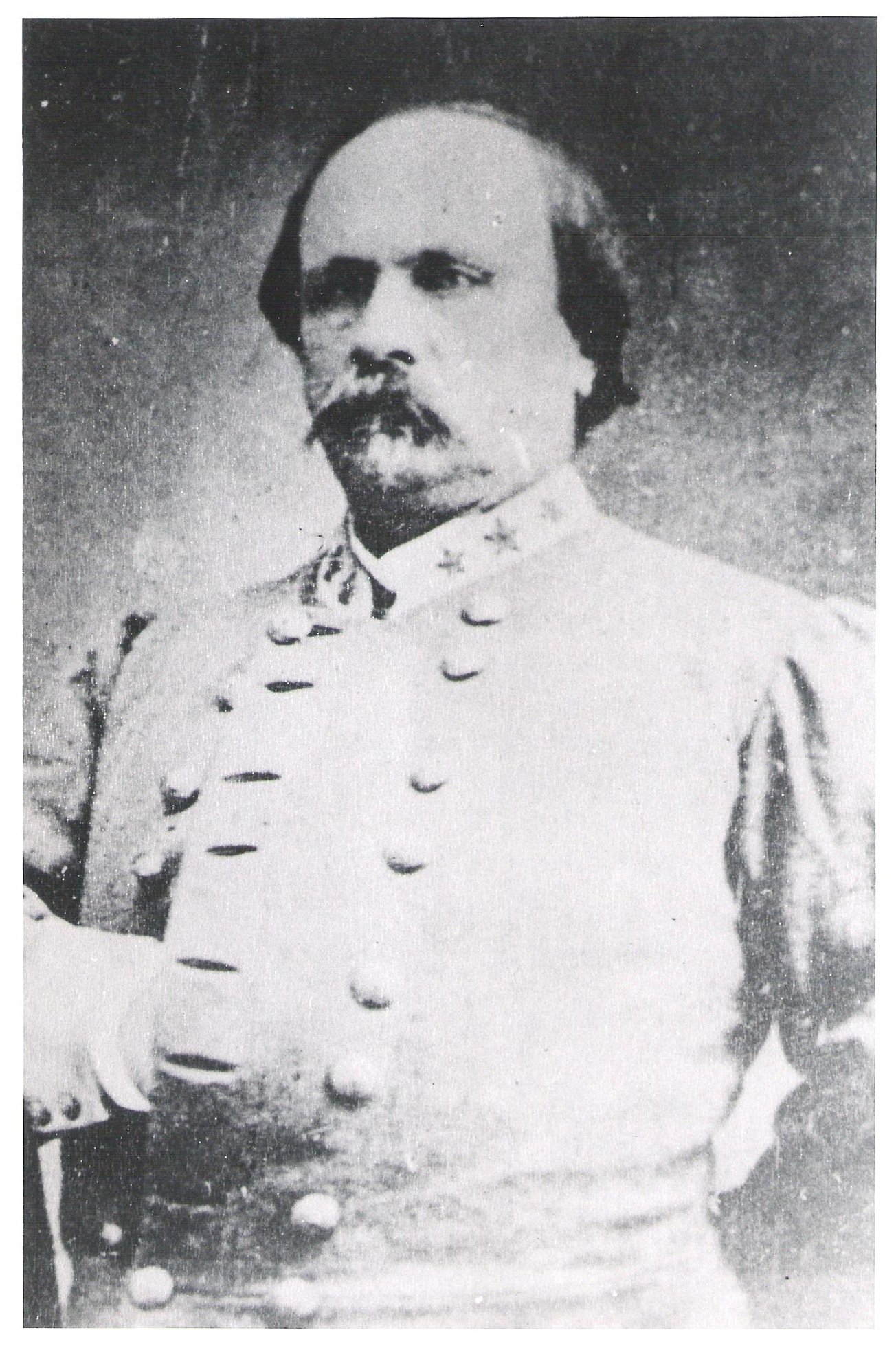
- General William Henry Wallace, C.S.A., Speaker of the South Carolina House of Representatives, and Circuit Judge.

34th Speaker of the South Carolina House of Representatives
- In office 1876–1877
- Preceded by: R.B. Elliot
- Succeeded by: John Calhoun Sheppard

Member of the South Carolina House of Representatives
- In office 1860/1872–1877

Personal details
- Born: March 24, 1827 Laurens County, South Carolina, U.S.
- Died: March 21, 1901 (aged 73) Union, South Carolina, U.S.
- Resting place: Union, South Carolina, U.S.
- Spouse: Sarah Smith Dunlap
- Relations: Daniel Wallace (father); John Calhoun Sheppard (son-in-law)
- Education: University of South Carolina

Military service
- Allegiance: Confederate States of America
- Branch/service: Confederate States Army
- Years of service: 1861–1865
- Rank: Brigadier General
- Commands: 18th South Carolina Infantry
- Battles/wars: American Civil War

William Henry Wallace (March 24, 1827 – March 21, 1901) was a Confederate States Army brigadier general during the American Civil War (Civil War). Before the Civil War, he was a planter, newspaper publisher, lawyer and South Carolina legislator in 1860 who supported the state calling a secession convention. He served in the Eastern Theater of the American Civil War, including service as a brigade commander in the Army of Northern Virginia. After the Civil War, he was a lawyer, planter, South Carolina legislator and circuit judge.

== Early life ==
Son of Congressman Daniel Wallace, William Henry Wallace was born March 24, 1827, in Laurens County, South Carolina, then the Laurens District. He graduated from South Carolina College, which became the University of South Carolina, in 1849. Before the Civil War, he was a planter, publisher of the Union Times newspaper (Union, South Carolina), lawyer and South Carolina legislator. As a member of the South Carolina legislature in 1860, Wallace supported the state calling a convention for the purpose of deciding the issue of secession. Wallace married Sarah Smith Dunlap, the great granddaughter of United States Senator John Hunter (South Carolina politician). Wallace's son-in-law was John Calhoun Sheppard the 82nd governor of South Carolina.

== American Civil War service ==
When Wallace completed his term in the South Carolina state legislature, he enlisted as a private in the 18th South Carolina Infantry Regiment. He was soon regimental adjutant and was elected first lieutenant and captain in January 1862. In May 1862, he was elected lieutenant colonel. The regiment was stationed in South Carolina until July 1862.

When the colonel of the regiment was killed during the Second Bull Run Campaign on August 30, 1862, Wallace succeeded to command of the regiment to rank from that date as colonel. He was not formally nominated for the appointment until June 10, 1864.

In the brigade of Brigadier General Nathan G. "Shanks" Evans, Wallace commanded his regiment at the Battle of South Mountain and the Battle of Antietam. The brigade then went to defend Charleston, South Carolina.

In the Spring of 1864, the brigade, then commanded by Brigadier General Stephen Elliott, Jr. was ordered to the defense of Petersburg, Virginia. The 18th South Carolina Infantry was holding part of the line under which the Union Army explosive charges were detonated which led to the Battle of the Crater on July 30, 1864. The mine explosion blew up four companies of the 18th South Carolina Infantry and injured Elliott.

William Henry Wallace was promoted to brigadier general, under the Confederate law permitting the Confederate President to appoint twenty temporary brigadier generals on September 20, 1864. Elliott had been incapacitated by the mine explosion so Wallace commanded his former brigade in Major General Bushrod Johnson's division, IV Corps, until the surrender of the Army of Northern Virginia on April 9, 1865, at Appomattox Court House, Virginia. Wallace was paroled at Appomattox Court House on that date.

== Aftermath ==
After the Civil War, Wallace returned to South Carolina where he was a lawyer and planter. He was elected to the South Carolina legislature for three two-year terms starting with the 1872 election. Wallace was a circuit judge from 1877 until he retired in 1893.

William Henry Wallace died on March 21, 1901, at Union, South Carolina. He is buried in Presbyterian Cemetery at Union.

== See also ==
- List of American Civil War generals (Confederate)
