= Freehold, New York =

- Hamlet
- Location within New York Location within the United States
- Coordinates: 42°21′23″N 74°02′56″W
- Country: United States
- State: New York
- County: Greene County
- Town: Greenville
- Elevation: 423 ft (129 m)
- Time zone: UTC-5 (EST)
  - Summer (DST): UTC-4 (EDT)
- ZIP Code: 12431
- Area code: 518
- GNIS feature ID: 950661

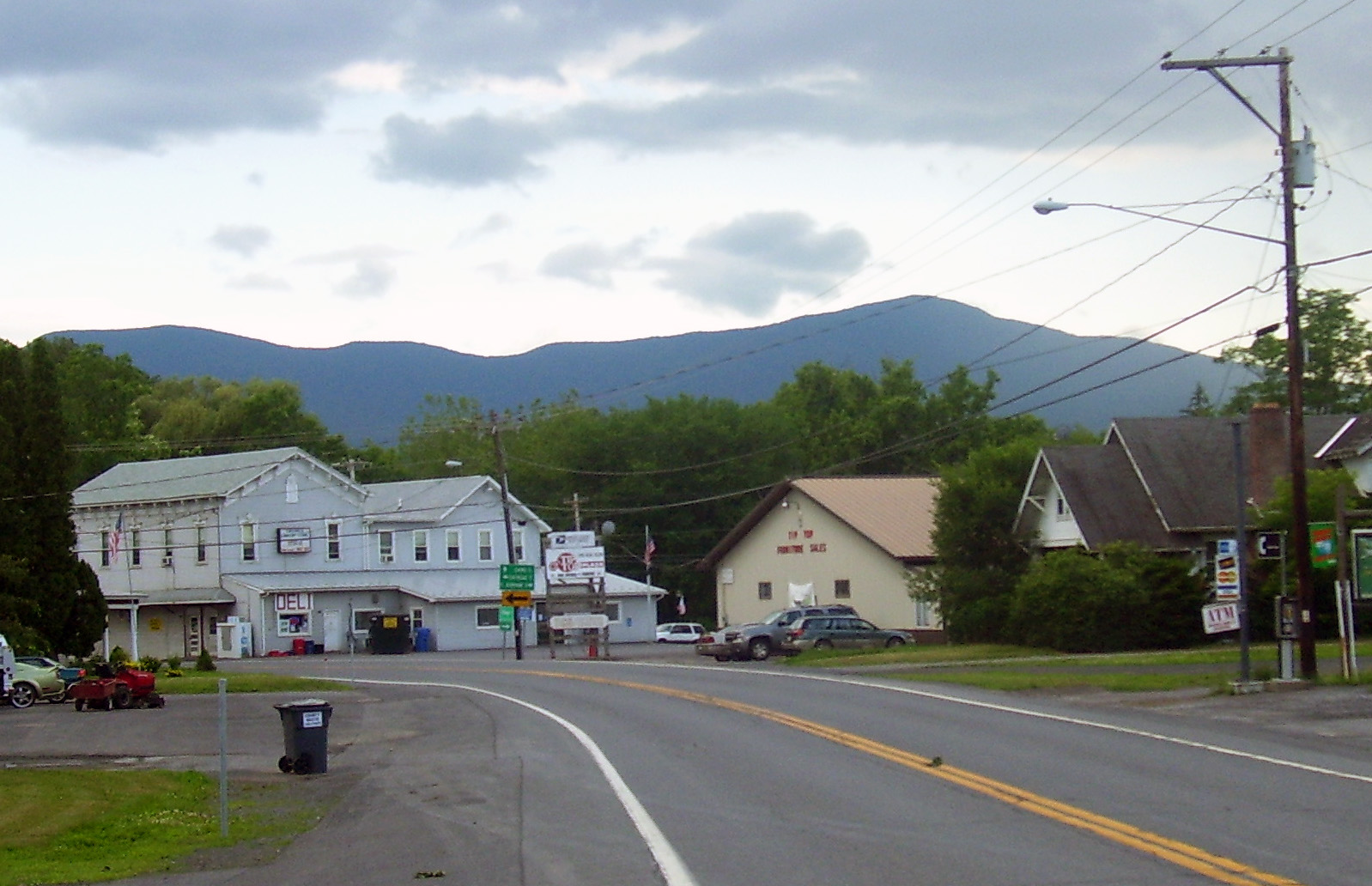
View south along NY 32 of Freehold, with Catskill Escarpment in background

Freehold is a hamlet in the town of Greenville in Greene County, New York, United States. It has the ZIP Code 12431, and its own fire district.

The hamlet is centered on the junction of New York State Route 32 and Greene County Route 67. There are several buildings there, such as the firehouse and a general store. It is located in The Northern Catskill Mountains of Greene County; the range's northern escarpment dominates the view south from Freehold.

Freehold Airport is located one mile west of the town and is a major hub for gliders.

== Notable person ==
- Esbon Blackmar, former US congressman
