= Bloody Bill Cunningham =

American Revolutionary loyalist (1756–1787)

William "Bloody Bill" Cunningham (1756–1787) was an American loyalist infamous for perpetrating a series of bloody massacres in South Carolina's backcountry in the fall of 1781 as commander of a Tory militia regiment in the Revolutionary War. Though his family were loyal to the British crown, Cunningham initially enlisted in the Continental Army as part of the State of South Carolina's 3rd regiment in 1775. His tenure in the rebel army was an unhappy one and Cunningham changed sides to fight for the British in 1778. He earned the nickname "Bloody Bill" for the violent, ruthless nature of his raids on rebels and patriot civilians.

== Background ==
Cunningham was born in Virginia in 1756. When William was 10, the Cunningham family migrated to Ninety-Six, South Carolina, along the Saluda River in 1766, an area known for its fierce Whig-Tory rivalry that occasionally spilled into violence. William is represented as a lively, honest man with a quick temper. He was an expert horseman, for which he gained popularity among his peers. When the revolution began, the Cunninghams quickly became one of the most powerful Tory families of the South Carolina backcountry. William's cousins Robert and Patrick Cunningham were prominent planters who became high-ranking officers in loyalist militias. Despite his family's allegiance to the British, William joined the Patriot cause in 1775 for reasons that remain unclear.

== Rebel soldier ==
William Cunningham enlisted in South Carolina's 3rd Regiment of Rangers on the Continental line under Captain John Caldwell and Colonel William Thomson in June 1775. Cunningham would later claim that upon enlistment he was promised promotion to first lieutenant and the right to resign if the company moved to the low country. On July 12, Cunningham's company took Fort Charlotte, seizing over 1000 pounds of gunpowder, 18 cannons, 15 muskets and 343 cannonballs. The seizure of the fort signaled South Carolina's entry into the Revolutionary War and the beginning of hostilities in the backcountry.

Cunningham's regiment arrived in Ninety-Six on November 19 to support Major Andrew Williamson against a band of Loyalist militia. The battle lasted for three days before the sides agreed to both lay down their arms. However, rebel Colonel Richard Richardson violated the truce, dispatching a fleet of Rangers to surprise a Loyalist party the morning of December 22. In what became known as the Battle of Great Cane Break, the rebels captured 130 men while suffering no casualties. The loyalist group was led by Cunningham's cousin Patrick, who managed to escape into Cherokee country.

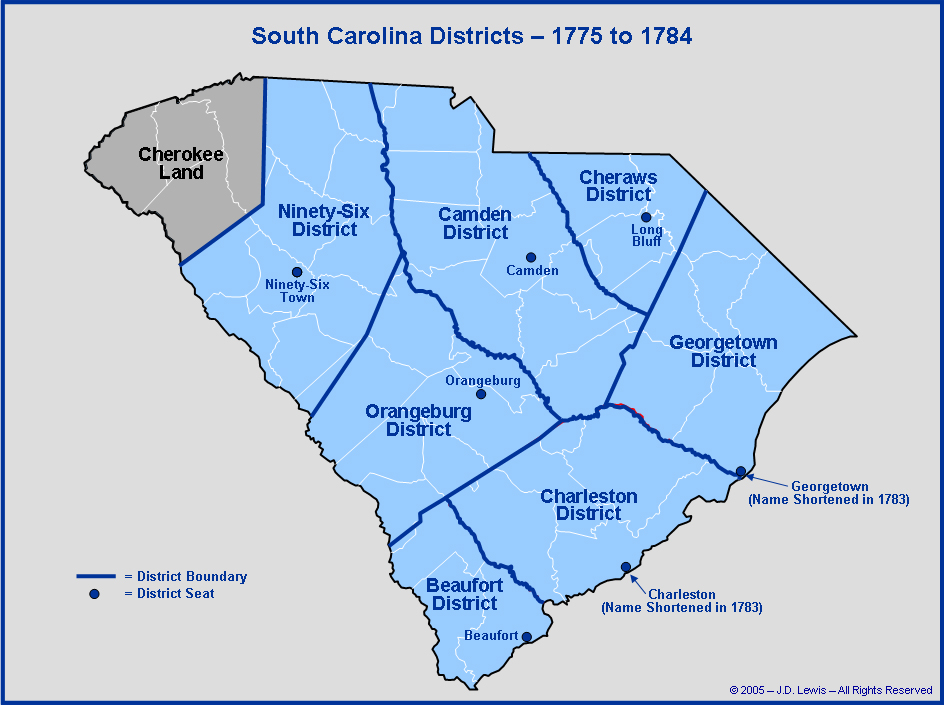
The district and county lines of South Carolina until 1784.

Capt. Caldwell denied Cunningham's request for the promotion he believed he had been promised, and when the company mobilized to Charleston in June 1776, Cunningham refused to go. He eventually decided to travel with the rest of the company and stayed a week. When he was dispatched to one of the islands surrounding the city, Cunningham tried to resign but was rejected. Upon their return to the mainland, Cunningham again attempted to resign and this time Caldwell arrested him. He faced a court martial for insubordination and was sentenced to a public whipping.

== Exile and return ==
Cunningham travelled home after his discharge from the army only to find a fierce neighborhood conflict was brewing. Whigs controlled Ninety-Six District and detested the Cunninghams' Tory allegiances. A local Whig captain named William Ritchie, who had fought with Cunningham in John Caldwell's company, got word out that if Cunningham returned to Ninety-Six, he would be killed on sight. At this, Cunningham fled south. Reports conflict as to where exactly Cunningham lived, some citing Savannah, Georgia, while others believe he went as far south as St. Augustine, Florida.

Cunningham's exile south lasted two years. In 1778, he received word that a group of Whigs led by Captain Ritchie had kicked his father out of his house and whipped his invalid brother to death. Boiling with anger, Cunningham trekked his way north to take revenge. Upon his return to the Saluda Country, he went straight to Ritchie's house and shot and killed him in front of his family.

== Loyalist soldier ==
When the British took control of the backcountry in 1780, Cunningham signed up as a private in Patrick Cunningham's loyalist regiment. He served in the militia for over a year, fighting in the British defeat at the Battle of King's Mountain in October 1780.

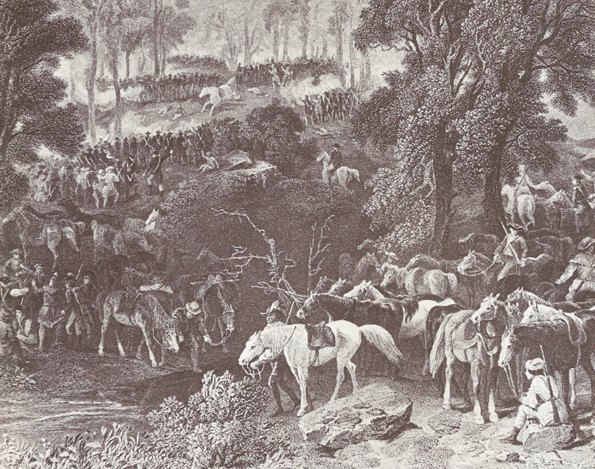
Artist's rendering of the Battle of Kings Mountain

Cunningham became a militia captain and remained with the army until the summer of 1781. After Patriot General Nathaniel Greene's siege of Ninety-Six, the British retreated towards Charleston in July 1781. On their way south, Cunningham and his men performed several minor raids on patriot camps. The British high command promoted him to major in October.

=== The "Bloody Scout" ===
In Charleston, Cunningham took command of a regiment numbering somewhere between eighty and three hundred men and set off on the infamous march that became known as the "Bloody Scout". The company began as part of a larger militia force under General Robert Cunningham but soon split off after a skirmish near Orangeburg with Patriot General Thomas Sumter's army. Given full autonomy over his troops, Cunningham oversaw a series of massacres that terrorized the backcountry during the fall of 1781.

Cunningham's first massacre came at Cloud's Creek on November 7, 1781. A small band of patriots, headed by Captains Sterling Turner and James Butler Sr, had been conducting raids against loyalist forces in the backcountry. They stopped at Cloud's Creek to rest for the night after a skirmish earlier in the day. Cunningham's men surrounded the patriots at dawn. Butler offered unconditional surrender but after a potshot killed one of Cunningham's men, the loyalists attacked. The loyalists easily overpowered their opponents and rounded them up for slaughter. In total, 28 patriots were killed, many by Cunningham himself.

Cunningham's men carried on, surprising various patriot groups at Orangeburg and Rowe's Plantation. He went out of his way to visit his old Whig captain John Caldwell. Two of his men shot Caldwell and despite crying tears of sadness at his ex-commander's death, Cunningham ordered his house burned to the ground.

Soon after, Cunningham travelled north back to Ninety-Six District and arrived at Hayes' Station near Edgehill, in what would be his next butchering. Cunningham led a surprise attack on patriot Colonel Joseph Hayes and his men on November 19, 1781. Cunningham ordered Hayes to surrender but he refused, believing that reinforcements would arrive in time to assist his outnumbered forces. Hayes' men held out in a small block house until they were forced to exit and surrender after the loyalist detachment set the house on fire. Cunningham gave them no quarter, hanging and slashing to death 18 men.

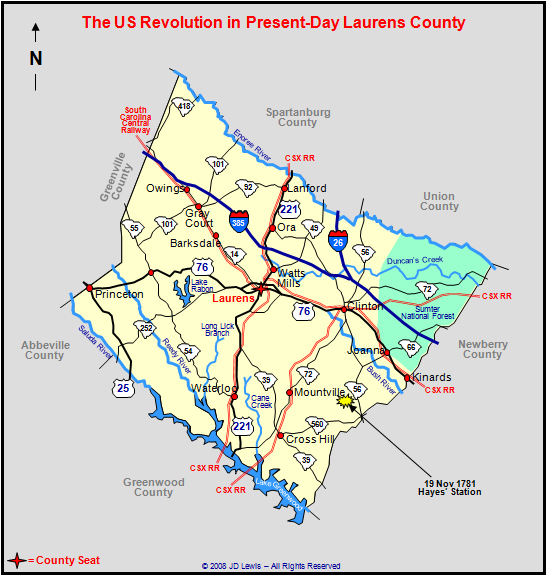
Location of Cunningham's massacre at Hayes' Station

After the massacre at Hayes' Station, the force travelled to present day Union County to the house of prominent Whig John Boyce. Boyce saw them coming and somehow managed to escape and alert a local militia company led by Captain Christopher Casey. Casey's men chased after Cunningham's loyalists and captured a few of his stragglers. Undeterred, Cunningham continued his reign of terror, murdering prominent Whigs Charles Moore, Colonel John Wood, Colonel Edward Hampton, and Lieutenant Governor James Wood in a matter of weeks.

The Bloody Scout had put the entire Whig population on high alert and forced patriot militias to mobilize against Cunningham. Brigadier General Andrew Pickens headed a force designed to find and kill Cunningham, who was believed to be hiding out along the Edisto River near Orangeburg. The morning of December 20, 1781, Pickens led his forces to where he believed Cunningham's camp to be. However, Cunningham had split his men up into a number of small camps all along the river. Pickens easily took the first camp by surprise but the rest heard the alarm and successfully escaped. Edisto River signaled Cunningham's imminent retreat and the end of the Bloody Scout. Cunningham and about two hundred of his men ended their retreat in the relative safety of Charleston in the last days of 1781. Not all of the men in Cunningham's Band escaped: one was killed in a fight with rebel pursuers; several were captured and either shot or hanged; one was lynched in 1784. Cunningham commanded a troop of dragoons for much of 1782, though their actions were minimal.

== Post-war life ==
Cunningham's property in present-day Saluda County was confiscated by the local patriot government later in 1782. He was forced to flee to East Florida, something of a hotspot for southern loyalist exiles. There he continued his life as an outlaw. He was accused of leading a band of robbers who looted houses and towns along the coast. Spain's provincial government sent him and his cronies to Havana to stand trial in front of the Viceroy who prohibited them from returning to Spanish territory. Cunningham somehow reentered Florida but was permanently expelled in 1785 for looting along the St. Mary's River. He retired to the Bahamas with his cousin Robert Cunningham later that year. William Cunningham died on January 18, 1787, in Nassau of unknown causes.

== Legacy ==
William Cunningham's massacres and bloodthirsty disposition during the Bloody Scout made him one of the most infamous figures in South Carolina history. In addition, his long fighting career on both sides of the war, along with his travels to Florida and beyond, have fascinated historians for decades. Cunningham's evolution from rebel soldier to loyalist soldier to loyalist major demonstrate the precarious nature of the rebel cause in South Carolina. Perhaps more significantly, his experiences show how deeply the war divided Americans. Cunningham's mass murders of fellow Americans in the fall of 1781 highlight how the Revolutionary War devolved into a civil war between Whigs and Tories despite Britain's surrender at Yorktown earlier that year.
