= Freehold Airport =

- IATA: none; ICAO: none; FAA LID: 1I5

Summary
- Airport type: Public
- Owner: Freehold Airport, LLC
- Operator: Nutmeg Soaring Association, Inc.
- Serves: Freehold, New York
- Elevation AMSL: 440 ft (130 m)
- Coordinates: 42°21′50″N 074°03′54″W
- Interactive map of Freehold Airport

Runways
Direction	Length		Surface
Direction	ft	m	Surface
12/30	2,275	693	Asphalt

Statistics (2011)
- Aircraft operations: 2,420
- Based aircraft: 29
- Source: Federal Aviation Administration

Freehold Airport (FAA LID: 1I5) is a public use airport located one nautical mile (2 km) northwest of the central business district of Freehold, in Greene County, New York, United States. It is privately owned by the Freehold Airport LLC and operated by the Nutmeg Soaring Association, Inc. This airport is included in the National Plan of Integrated Airport Systems for 2011–2015, which categorized it as a general aviation facility.

== Facilities and aircraft ==
Freehold Airport covers an area of 54 acres (22 ha) at an elevation of 440 feet (134 m) above mean sea level. It has one runway designated 12/30 with an asphalt surface measuring 2,275 by 22 feet (693 x 7 m).

For the 12-month period ending July 15, 2011, the airport had 2,420 general aviation aircraft operations, an average of 201 per month. At that time there were 29 aircraft based at this airport: 86% glider and 14% ultralight.

== See also ==
- List of airports in New York
