= John J. Taylor (New York politician) =

American politician

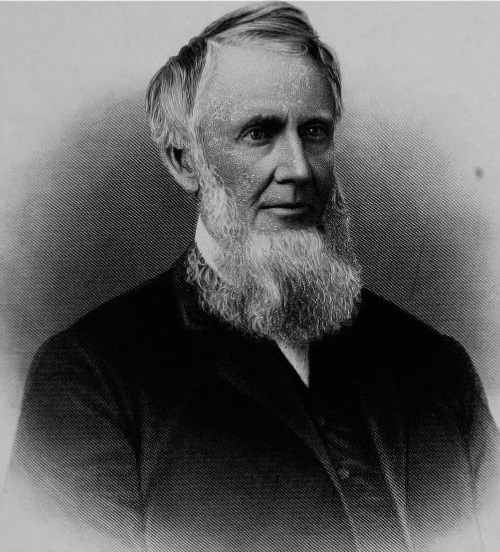
- From 1888's Historical Gazetteer of Tioga County, New York

Member of the U.S. House of Representatives from New York's 27th district
- In office March 4, 1853 – March 3, 1855
- Preceded by: William A. Sackett
- Succeeded by: John Mason Parker

Personal details
- Born: John James Taylor; April 27, 1808 Leominster, Massachusetts
- Died: July 1, 1892 (aged 84) Owego, New York
- Resting place: Evergreen Cemetery, Owego, New York
- Party: Democratic
- Spouse: Emily Laning (m. 1837-1879, her death)
- Children: 2
- Education: Harvard University
- Profession: Attorney; Businessman

John James Taylor (April 27, 1808 – July 1, 1892) was an American attorney and businessman. He is most notable for his service as a U.S. representative from New York, a position he held from 1853 to 1855.

== Early life ==
Taylor was born in Leominster, Massachusetts, on April 27, 1808, and was a son of John and Anne Taylor, who had immigrated to Leominster from Oldham, Lancashire, England. He attended the common schools of Leominster until age 14, then attended New Ipswich Academy, and Groton Academy. In 1825, Taylor began attendance at Harvard University, from which he graduated in 1829.

=== Early career ===
Taylor taught school in 1829 and 1830, including a term in Philadelphia. In 1830, he moved to Troy, New York, where he studied law with Judge David Buel. He completed his legal studies with John A. Collier of Binghamton, New York. He was admitted to the bar in 1834 and commenced practice in Greene, New York. Taylor subsequently moved to he moved to Owego, New York, where he continued to practice law.

Active in politics as a Democrat, Taylor served as district attorney of Tioga County from 1838 until resigning in 1843. He served as one of Owego's village trustees in 1839, 1843, and 1848.

He was the first chief engineer of the village fire department beginning in 1844. From 1846 to 1847, Taylor was a delegate to the state constitutional convention.

== Congressman ==
In 1850, Taylor ran unsuccessfully for a seat in the Thirty-second Congress. He ran successfully in 1852, and served in the Thirty-third Congress (March 4, 1853 – March 3, 1855). Taylor was a member of the Foreign Affairs and District of Columbia committees, and was recognized as a supporter of Franklin Pierce's presidential administration. Taylor was a candidate for appointment as Collector of the Port of New York, but did not receive the position. Pierce offered him appointment as U.S. commissioner to settle the northwestern boundary of the United States, but Taylor declined to serve. He was not a candidate for reelection in 1854, and resumed practicing law in Owego.

== Later life ==
In 1858, Taylor was the unsuccessful Democratic nominee for lieutenant governor. In 1859 he served as Owego's village president. Taylor was an organizer and longtime president of the Bank of Tioga, which was later called the National Union Bank. He was also active in the management of the Southern Central Railway, which was subsequently renamed the Auburn division of the Lehigh Valley Railroad, first as vice president and later as president. Taylor retired following the death of his wife in 1879.

== Death and burial ==
Taylor died in Owego on July 1, 1892. He was buried at Evergreen Cemetery in Owego.

== Family ==
In 1837, Taylor married Emily Laning of Owego. They were the parents of a son, John L. Taylor (b. 1839) and a daughter, Sarah (b. 1841), who married L. Burr Pearsall.

U.S. House of Representatives
Preceded by William A. Sackett	Member of the U.S. House of Representatives from New York's 27th congressional district 1853–1855	Succeeded by John Mason Parker
