= Esbon Blackmar =

American politician

Member of the U.S. House of Representatives from New York's 27th district
- In office December 4, 1848 – March 4, 1849
- Preceded by: John M. Holley
- Succeeded by: William A. Sackett

Personal details
- Born: June 19, 1805 Freehold, New York, US
- Died: November 19, 1857 (aged 52) Newark, New York, US
- Party: Whig Party
- Spouse: Arabella Reed Blackmar
- Children: Jane Augusta Blackmar; Frank Blackmar
- Profession: Merchant; Farmer; Politician

Esbon Blackmar (June 19, 1805 – November 19, 1857) was an American politician and a Whig Party U.S. representative from New York.

== Biography ==
Born in Freehold, New York, Blackmar was the son of Abel and Polly Trowbridge Blackmar. He attended local schools, and moved to Wayne County, New York in 1826, living first in Arcadia, New York and later in Newark, New York. He married Arabella Reed and they had two children, Jane Augusta, and Frank.

== Career ==
Blackmar was a merchant and farmer in partnership with his brother, and their endeavors included buying and selling grain and produce, boat building, and shipping grain and other commodities on the Erie Canal. He was active in the New York Militia, serving as Quartermaster of the 5th Horse Artillery Regiment, and later holding the position of regimental Lieutenant Colonel and second-in-command.

From 1834 to 1835 Blackmar served as Newark's Town Supervisor. Blackmar was a member of the New York State Assembly (Wayne County) in 1838 and 1841.

His business expanded to include shipping produce to Michigan, Iowa and Illinois. In 1844 he donated the land for the original campus of Hillsdale College in Michigan. He also served as Treasurer and a member of the board of directors of the Sodus Point and Southern Railroad.

Elected as a Whig to the 30th United States Congress to fill the vacancy caused by the death of John M. Holley, Blackmar held the office of United States Representative for the 27th district of New York from December 4, 1848, to March 4, 1849. Afterwards he resumed his former business activities in Newark. Blackmar served again as Town Supervisor from 1852 to 1853.

== Death ==
Blackmar died by drowning in a well at his home in Newark on November 19, 1857 (age 52 years, 153 days). According to published accounts, his business failed in the Panic of 1857, and he was in debt for more than $150,000 (about $3.7 million in 2014). He is interred at Willow Avenue Cemetery in Newark.

U.S. House of Representatives
Preceded by John M. Holley	Representative of the 27th Congressional District of New York; December 4, 1848 – March 4, 1849	Succeeded by William A. Sackett
