= John McQueen =

American politician

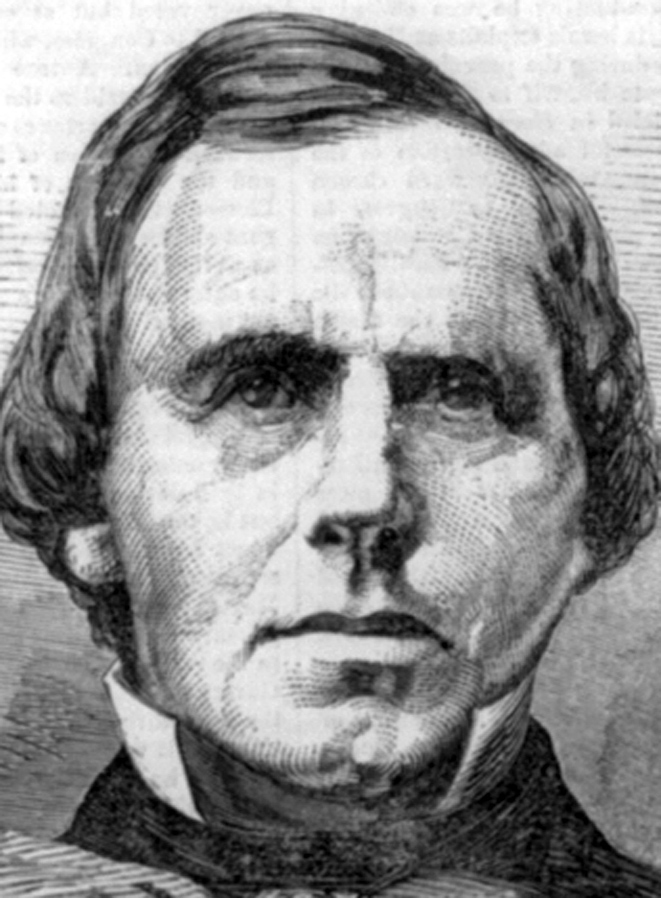
- Portrait of McQueen, c. 1860

Member of the Confederate States House of Representatives from South Carolina's 1st district
- In office February 18, 1862 – February 18, 1864
- Preceded by: Position established
- Succeeded by: James Hervey Witherspoon, Jr.

Member of the U.S. House of Representatives from South Carolina
- In office February 12, 1849 – December 21, 1860
- Preceded by: Alexander D. Sims (4th); Daniel Wallace (1st)
- Succeeded by: Preston S. Brooks (4th); Vacant (1st)
- Constituency: 4th district (1849-53); 1st district (1853-60)

Personal details
- Born: February 9, 1804 Robeson County, North Carolina, U.S.
- Died: August 30, 1867 (aged 63) Society Hill, South Carolina, U.S.
- Resting place: Society Hill, South Carolina, U.S.
- Party: Democratic
- Spouse: Sarah Elizabeth Pickens (m. 1851)
- Profession: Lawyer, politician

Military service
- Allegiance: United States of America
- Branch/service: North Carolinian militia
- Years of service: 1833–1837

John McQueen (February 9, 1804 – August 30, 1867) was an American lawyer and politician. He was a U.S. representative from South Carolina and a member of the Confederate States Congress during the American Civil War.

== Early life and education ==
Born in Queensdale in Robeson County, North Carolina, near the town of Maxton, North Carolina, McQueen completed preparatory studies under private tutors and was graduated from the University of North Carolina at Chapel Hill. He subsequently studied law in Marlboro District, S.C. now known as Clio, South Carolina. He was admitted to the bar in 1828 and commenced practice in Bennettsville, South Carolina. McQueen served in the State militia in 1833–37. He was an unsuccessful candidate for election in 1844 to the 29th United States Congress.

== Career ==
McQueen was elected as a Democrat to the 30th and 31st Congresses to fill the vacancies caused by the death of Alexander D. Sims. He was reelected to the 32nd and to the four succeeding Congresses, and served from February 12, 1849, until his retirement on December 21, 1860.

=== American Civil War ===
An ardent supporter of slavery and southern states' rights, McQueen was elected as a representative from South Carolina in the First Confederate Congress after the outbreak of the American Civil War. Regarding the Confederacy's cause for starting the war, McQueen stated in a December 1860 letter to civic leaders in Richmond, Virginia:

I have never doubted what Virginia would do when the alternatives present themselves to her intelligent and gallant people, to choose between an association with her sisters and the dominion of a people, who have chosen their leader upon the single idea that the African is equal to the Anglo-Saxon, and with the purpose of placing our slaves on equality with ourselves and our friends of every condition! and if we of South Carolina have aided in your deliverance from tyranny and degradation, as you suppose, it will only the more assure us that we have performed our duty to ourselves and our sisters in taking the first decided step to preserve an inheritance left us by an ancestry whose spirit would forbid its being tarnished by assassins. We, of South Carolina, hope soon to greet you in a Southern Confederacy, where white men shall rule our destinies, and from which we may transmit to our posterity the rights, privileges and honor left us by our ancestors.

== Later life and death ==
He died at Society Hill, South Carolina, on August 30, 1867, and was interred in the Episcopal Cemetery in Society Hill, South Carolina.

== Personal life ==
He married Sarah Elizabeth Pickens (September 29, 1831 – September 22, 1909 at Asheville, North Carolina), granddaughter of American Revolutionary War General Andrew Pickens on December 31, 1851, in Cahaba, Alabama.

Confederate States House of Representatives
Preceded by Position established	Member of the Confederate House of Representatives from South Carolina's 1st Congressional District; 1862–1864	Succeeded by James Hervey Witherspoon, Jr.
U.S. House of Representatives
Preceded by Daniel Wallace	Member of the U.S. House of Representatives from South Carolina's 1st congressional district 1853–1860	Succeeded by Benjamin F. Whittemore (1868)
Preceded by Alexander D. Sims	Member of the U.S. House of Representatives from South Carolina's 4th congressional district 1849–1853	Succeeded by Preston S. Brooks
