= David Fisher (politician) =

American politician (1794–1886)

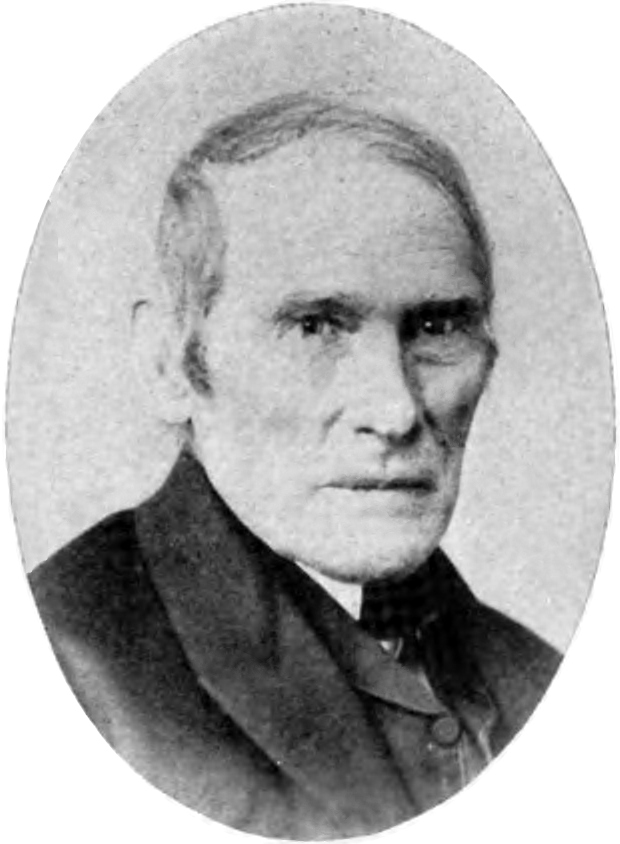

Member of the U.S. House of Representatives from Ohio's 2nd district
- In office March 4, 1847 – March 3, 1849
- Preceded by: Francis A. Cunningham
- Succeeded by: Lewis D. Campbell

Member of the Ohio House of Representatives from the Clermont, Brown and Clinton Counties district
- In office December 5, 1842 – December 3, 1843 Serving with Thomas Ross, Moses Rees, John D. White
- Preceded by: Stephen Evans, Reader W. Clarke, Gideon Dunham
- Succeeded by: William Roudebush, James F. Sargeant, John D. White
- In office 1834

Personal details
- Born: December 3, 1794 Somerset County, Pennsylvania
- Died: May 7, 1886 (aged 91) Mount Holly, Ohio
- Resting place: Wesleyan Cemetery, Cincinnati, Ohio
- Party: Whig

David Fisher (December 3, 1794 – May 7, 1886) was an American newspaperman and politician who served one term as a U.S. representative from Ohio from 1847 to 1849.

== Biography ==
David Fisher was born in Somerset County, Pennsylvania, and moved with his parents to Point Pleasant, Ohio in 1799.

He pursued preparatory studies and became a lay preacher and newspaper contributor. Fisher served as member of the State house of representatives in 1834 and later was an unsuccessful candidate for governor in 1844.

In 1846 he was editor and proprietor of a newspaper in Wilmington, Ohio.

=== Congress ===
Fisher was elected as a Whig to the Thirtieth Congress (March 4, 1847 – March 3, 1849) and was not a candidate for renomination in 1848. While in Congress he occupied a seat next to John Quincy Adams, who fell into his arms when stricken with paralysis. Fisher returned to Cincinnati, Ohio where he resumed newspaper activities and was city magistrate in 1849 and 1850.

=== Death and burial ===
He died near Mount Holly, Ohio, May 7, 1886, and is interred in Wesleyan Cemetery, Cincinnati, Ohio.

== Sources ==
- United States Congress. "David Fisher (id: F000145)". Biographical Directory of the United States Congress.

U.S. House of Representatives
Preceded by Francis A. Cunningham	Member of the U.S. House of Representatives from North Carolina's 1st congressional district 1847-1849	Succeeded by Lewis D. Campbell
