= John M. Holley =

American politician (1802–1848)

Member of the U.S. House of Representatives from New York's 27th district
- In office March 4, 1847 – March 8, 1848
- Preceded by: John De Mott
- Succeeded by: Esbon Blackmar

Member of the New York State Assembly
- In office January 1, 1841 – December 31, 1841
- In office January 1, 1838 – December 31, 1838

Personal details
- Born: John Milton Holley; November 10, 1802 Salisbury, Connecticut, U.S.
- Died: March 8, 1848 (aged 45) Jacksonville, Florida, U.S.
- Resting place: Rural Cemetery, Lyons, New York, U.S.
- Party: Whig
- Education: Yale College
- Profession: Politician, lawyer

John Milton Holley (November 10, 1802 – March 8, 1848) was a U.S. representative from New York.

Holleye was born in Salisbury, Connecticut on November 10, 1802. He graduated from Yale College in 1822. He then studied law. He was admitted to the bar and commenced practice in Black Rock, New York, in 1825. He moved to Lyons, New York, in 1826 and continued the practice of law. He was a member of the New York State Assembly (Wayne Co.) in 1838 and 1841. He served as district attorney of Wayne County 1842–1845. He was an unsuccessful candidate for election in 1844 to the Twenty-ninth Congress.

Holley was elected as a Whig to the Thirtieth Congress and served from March 4, 1847, until his death in Jacksonville, Florida, March 8, 1848. He was interred in the Rural Cemetery, Lyons, New York.

== See also ==
- List of members of the United States Congress who died in office (1790–1899)

== Sources ==
- United States Congress. "John M. Holley (id: H000723)". Biographical Directory of the United States Congress.

U.S. House of Representatives
Preceded by John De Mott	Member of the U.S. House of Representatives from New York's 27th congressional district 1847–1848	Succeeded by Esbon Blackmar
