= David S. Jackson =

American politician

Member of the U.S. House of Representatives from New York's 6th district
- In office March 4, 1847 – April 19, 1848
- Preceded by: William W. Campbell
- Succeeded by: Horace Greeley

Personal details
- Born: 1813 New York City
- Died: January 20, 1872 (aged 58–59) New York City
- Party: Democratic

David Sherwood Jackson (1813 – January 20, 1872) was an American businessman and politician who served 13 months as a U.S. representative from New York from 1847 to 1848, when his election was declared invalid following an investigation by the House.

== Biography ==
Born in New York City in 1813, Jackson grew up attending public schools. He served as an alderman in the common council of New York City from 1843 to 1846, while engaging in various business pursuits.

=== Congress ===
Jackson was elected as a Democrat to the 30th Congress however his opponent contested the election on the grounds of fraud because several "paupers" living in an almshouse voted using the almshouse as their address. After a House investigation it was determined that neither candidate had won and the seat was made vacant. Jackson served from March 4, 1847 until April 19, 1848 before his seat was vacated.

=== Later career and death ===
Jackson then resumed his former business pursuits. He again served as an alderman in the common council in 1856 and 1857.

Jackson died in New York City and was interred in the New York City Marble Cemetery.

U.S. House of Representatives
Preceded by William W. Campbell	Member of the U.S. House of Representatives from New York's 6th congressional district 1847–1848	Succeeded by Horace Greeley
