= 30th United States Congress =

1847-1849 U.S. Congress

←	29th	31st	→
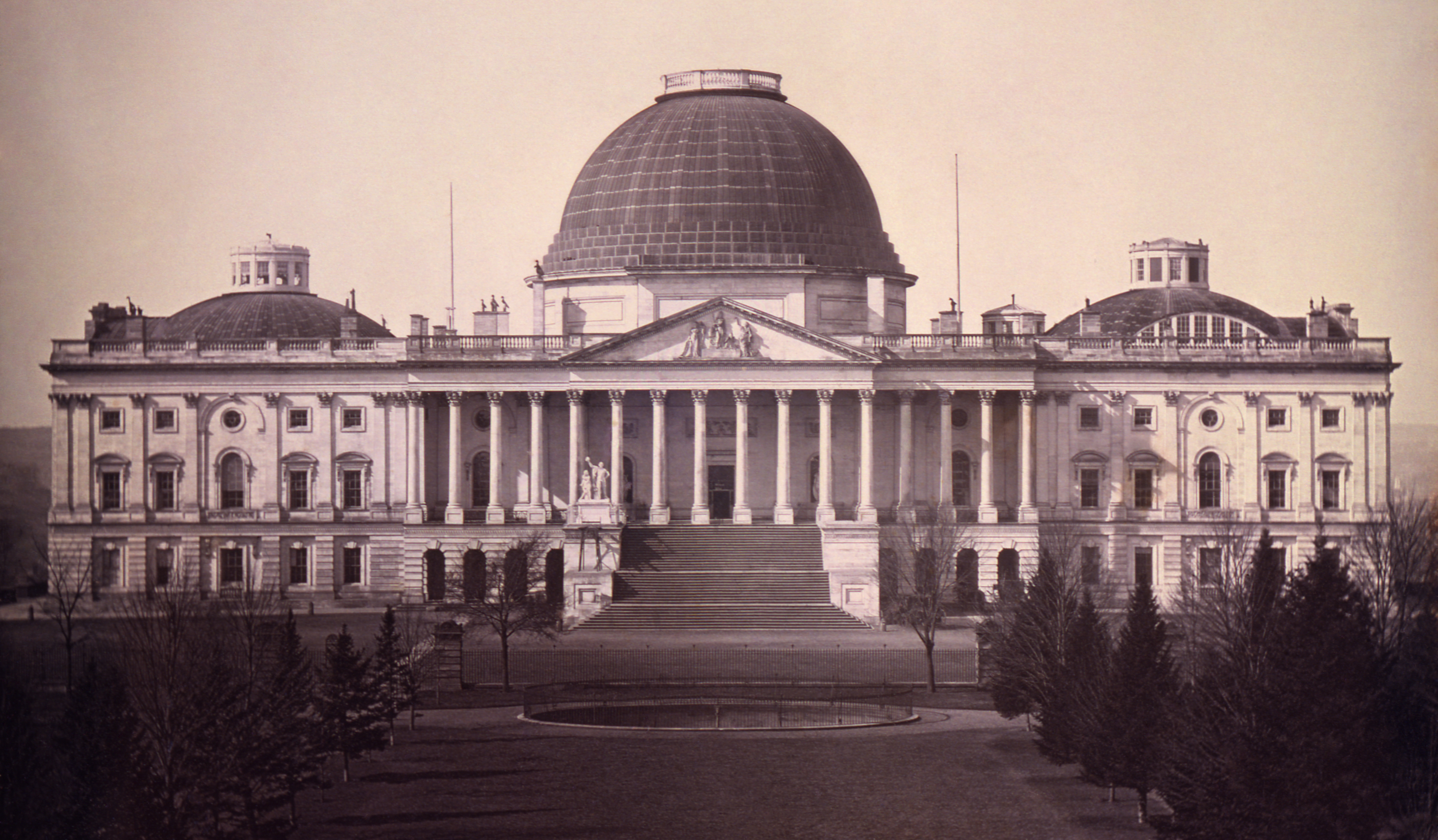
- United States Capitol (1846)

Overview
- Legislative body: United States Congress
- Jurisdiction: United States
- Term: March 4, 1847 – March 4, 1849

Senate
- Members: 60
- President: George M. Dallas (D)
- President pro tempore: David R. Atchison (D)
- Party control: Democratic

House of Representatives
- Members: 230 representatives 2 non-voting delegates
- Speaker: Robert C. Winthrop (W)
- Party control: Whig (plurality in the 2nd half of the 1st Congressional session)

Sessions
- 1st: December 6, 1847 – August 14, 1848
- 2nd: December 4, 1848 – March 3, 1849

The 30th United States Congress was a meeting of the legislative branch of the United States federal government, consisting of the United States Senate and the United States House of Representatives. It met in Washington, D.C. from March 4, 1847, to March 4, 1849, during the last two years of the administration of President James K. Polk. The apportionment of seats in the House of Representatives was based on the 1840 United States census. The Senate had a Democratic majority, and the House had a Whig majority. It was the only Congress in which Abraham Lincoln served.

== Major events ==
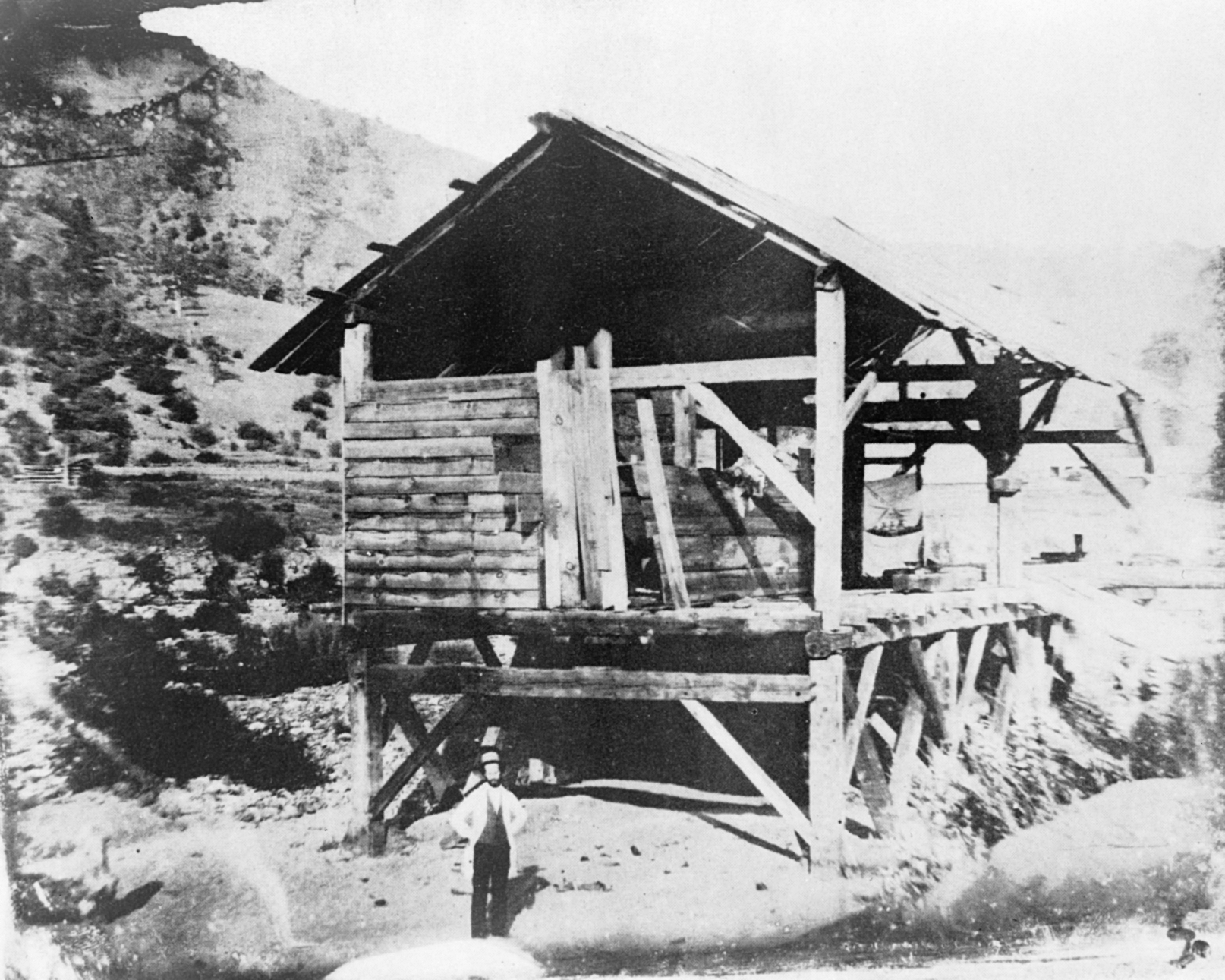
Sutter's Mill, origin of the California Gold Rush

- July 1, 1847: United States issued its first postage stamps
- January 24, 1848: Gold found at Sutter's Mill, beginning the California Gold Rush
- January 31, 1848: Washington Monument established
- May 29, 1848: Wisconsin is granted statehood, becoming the 30th state
- February 23, 1848: Former President John Quincy Adams, now a Congressman representing Massachusetts, dies in the Speaker's office after suffering a stroke in the House Chambers two days earlier.
- July 19, 1848: Seneca Falls Convention
- November 7, 1848: U.S. presidential election, 1848: Whig Zachary Taylor defeated Lewis Cass in the first US presidential election held in every state on the same day.
- 1846–1848: Mexican–American War

== Major legislation ==
- March 3, 1849: United States Department of the Interior established, sess. 2, ch. 108, 9 Stat. 395
- March 3, 1849: Gold Coinage Act, sess. 2, ch. 109, 9 Stat. 397

== Treaty ==
Mapa de los Estados Unidos de Méjico by John Distrunell: the 1847 map used during negotiations of the Treaty of Guadalupe Hidalgo.

- February 2, 1848: Treaty of Guadalupe Hidalgo signed, ending the Mexican–American War and ceding to the United States virtually all of what is today the southwest United States.

== States admitted and territories established ==
- May 29, 1848: Wisconsin admitted as the 30th U.S. state, sess. 1, ch. 50, 9 Stat. 235
- August 14, 1848: Oregon Territory was formed from territory ceded by Great Britain, sess. 1, ch. 177, 9 Stat. 323
- March 3, 1849: Minnesota Territory formed from the Wisconsin Territory, sess. 2, ch. 121, 9 Stat. 403

== Party summary ==
=== Senate ===
During this congress, two Senate seats were added for the new state of Wisconsin.

	Party (shading shows control)				Total	Vacant
	Democratic (D)	Independent Democratic (ID)	Liberty (L)	Whig (W)	Total	Vacant
End of previous congress	31	0	1	24	56	2
Begin	34	1	0	20	55	3
End	38	1	0	21	60	0
Final voting share	63.3%	1.7%	0.0%	35.0%		
Beginning of next congress	33	0	0	25	58	2

=== House of Representatives ===
During this congress, two House seats were added for the new state of Wisconsin.

Affiliation	Party (Shading indicates majority caucus)					Total	
Affiliation	American	Democratic	Independent Democratic	Independent	Whig	Total	Vacant
End of previous Congress	12	137	0	0	77	226	2
Begin	1	107	2	1	116	227	1
April 27, 1847	1	106	2	1	116	226	2
December 6, 1847	1	108	2	1	116	228	0
January 16, 1848	1	108	2	1	115	227	1
February 23, 1848	1	108	2	1	114	226	2
March 6, 1848	1	109	2	1	114	227	1
March 8, 1848	1	109	2	1	113	226	2
April 3, 1848	1	108	2	1	114	226	2
April 19, 1848	1	107	2	1	114	225	3
May 29, 1848	1	107	2	1	114	225	5
June 8, 1848	1	109	2	1	114	227	3
June 12, 1848	1	110	2	1	114	228	2
November 22, 1848	1	109	2	1	114	227	3
December 4, 1848	1	109	2	1	116	229	1
February 12, 1849	1	110	2	1	116	230	0
Final voting share	.5%	48%	1%	.5%	50.5%		
Beginning of the next Congress	1	113	0	0	107	221	1

== Leadership ==
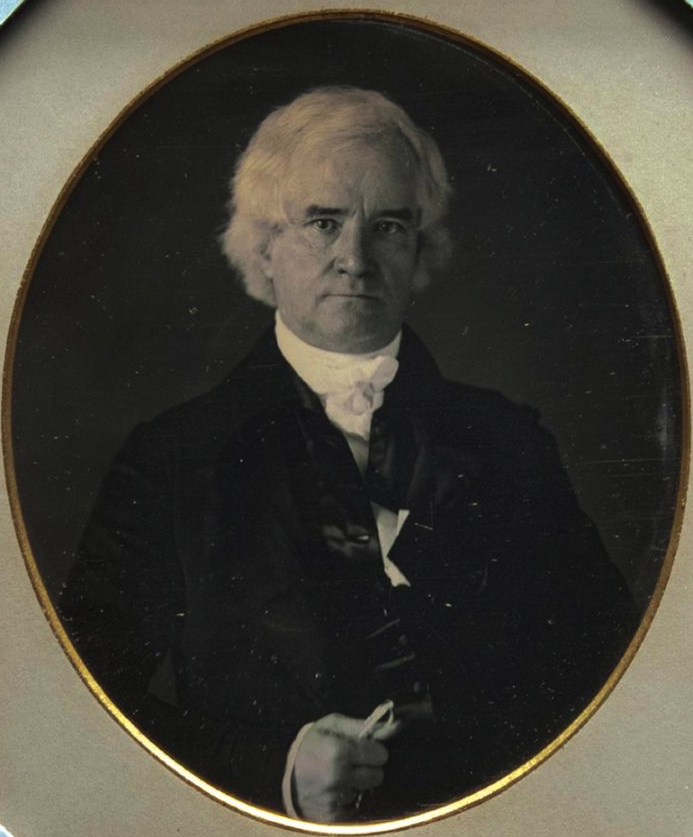
President of the Senate George M. Dallas

=== Senate ===
- President: George M. Dallas (D)
- President pro tempore: David R. Atchison (D)

=== House of Representatives ===
- Speaker: Robert C. Winthrop (W)

== Members ==
This list is arranged by chamber, then by state. Senators are listed by class and representatives are listed by district.

Skip to House of Representatives, below

=== Senate ===
==== Alabama ====
▌2. Dixon H. Lewis (D), until October 25, 1848

▌Benjamin Fitzpatrick (D), from November 25, 1848

▌3. Arthur P. Bagby (D), until June 16, 1848

▌William R. King (D), from July 1, 1848

==== Arkansas ====
▌2. Chester Ashley (D), until April 29, 1848

▌William K. Sebastian (D), from May 12, 1848

▌3. Ambrose H. Sevier (D), until March 15, 1848

▌Solon Borland (D), from March 30, 1848

==== Connecticut ====
▌1. Jabez W. Huntington (W), until November 1, 1847

▌Roger S. Baldwin (W), from November 11, 1847

▌3. John M. Niles (D)

==== Delaware ====
▌1. John M. Clayton (W), until February 23, 1849

▌John Wales (W), from February 23, 1849

▌2. Presley Spruance (W)

==== Florida ====
▌1. David Levy Yulee (D)
▌3. James Westcott (D)

==== Georgia ====
▌2. John Macpherson Berrien (W)
▌3. Walter T. Colquitt (D), until February 4, 1848

▌Herschel V. Johnson (D), from February 4, 1848

==== Illinois ====
▌2. Stephen A. Douglas (D)
▌3. Sidney Breese (D)

==== Indiana ====
▌1. Jesse D. Bright (D)
▌3. Edward A. Hannegan (D)

==== Iowa ====
▌2. George Wallace Jones (D), from December 7, 1848
▌3. Augustus C. Dodge (D), from December 7, 1848

==== Kentucky ====
▌2. Joseph R. Underwood (W)
▌3. John J. Crittenden (W), until June 12, 1848

▌Thomas Metcalfe (W), from June 23, 1848

==== Louisiana ====
▌2. Solomon W. Downs (D)
▌3. Henry Johnson (W)

==== Maine ====
▌1. John Fairfield (D), until December 24, 1847

▌Wyman B. S. Moor (D), January 5, 1848 – June 7, 1848
▌Hannibal Hamlin (D), from June 7, 1848

▌2. James W. Bradbury (D)

==== Maryland ====
▌1. Reverdy Johnson (W)
▌3. James Pearce (W)

==== Massachusetts ====
▌1. Daniel Webster (W)
▌2. John Davis (W)

==== Michigan ====
▌1. Lewis Cass (D), until May 29, 1848

▌Thomas Fitzgerald (D), from June 8, 1848

▌2. Alpheus Felch (D)

==== Mississippi ====
▌1. Jesse Speight (D), until May 1, 1847

▌Jefferson Davis (D), from August 10, 1847

▌2. Henry S. Foote (D)

==== Missouri ====
▌1. Thomas H. Benton (D)
▌3. David R. Atchison (D)

==== New Hampshire ====
▌2. John P. Hale (ID)
▌3. Charles G. Atherton (D)

==== New Jersey ====
▌1. William L. Dayton (W)
▌2. Jacob W. Miller (W)

==== New York ====
▌1. Daniel S. Dickinson (D)
▌3. John A. Dix (D)

==== North Carolina ====
▌2. Willie P. Mangum (W)
▌3. George E. Badger (W)

==== Ohio ====
▌1. Thomas Corwin (W)
▌3. William Allen (D)

==== Pennsylvania ====
▌1. Daniel Sturgeon (D)
▌3. Simon Cameron (D)

==== Rhode Island ====
▌1. Albert C. Greene (W)
▌2. John H. Clarke (W)

==== South Carolina ====
▌2. John C. Calhoun (D)
▌3. Andrew Butler (D)

==== Tennessee ====
▌1. Hopkins L. Turney (D)
▌2. John Bell (W), from November 22, 1847

==== Texas ====
▌1. Thomas J. Rusk (D)
▌2. Samuel Houston (D)

==== Vermont ====
▌1. Samuel S. Phelps (W)
▌3. William Upham (W)

==== Virginia ====
▌1. James M. Mason (D)
▌2. Robert M. T. Hunter (D)

==== Wisconsin ====
▌1. Henry Dodge (D), from June 8, 1848 (newly admitted state)
▌3. Isaac P. Walker (D), from June 8, 1848 (newly admitted state)

Senators' party membership by state at the opening of the 30th Congress in March 1847. The green stripes in New Hampshire represent independent Democrat John P. Hale. The senators from Iowa and Wisconsin were not seated until later in the Congress. 2 Democrats 1 Democrat and 1 Whig 2 Whigs

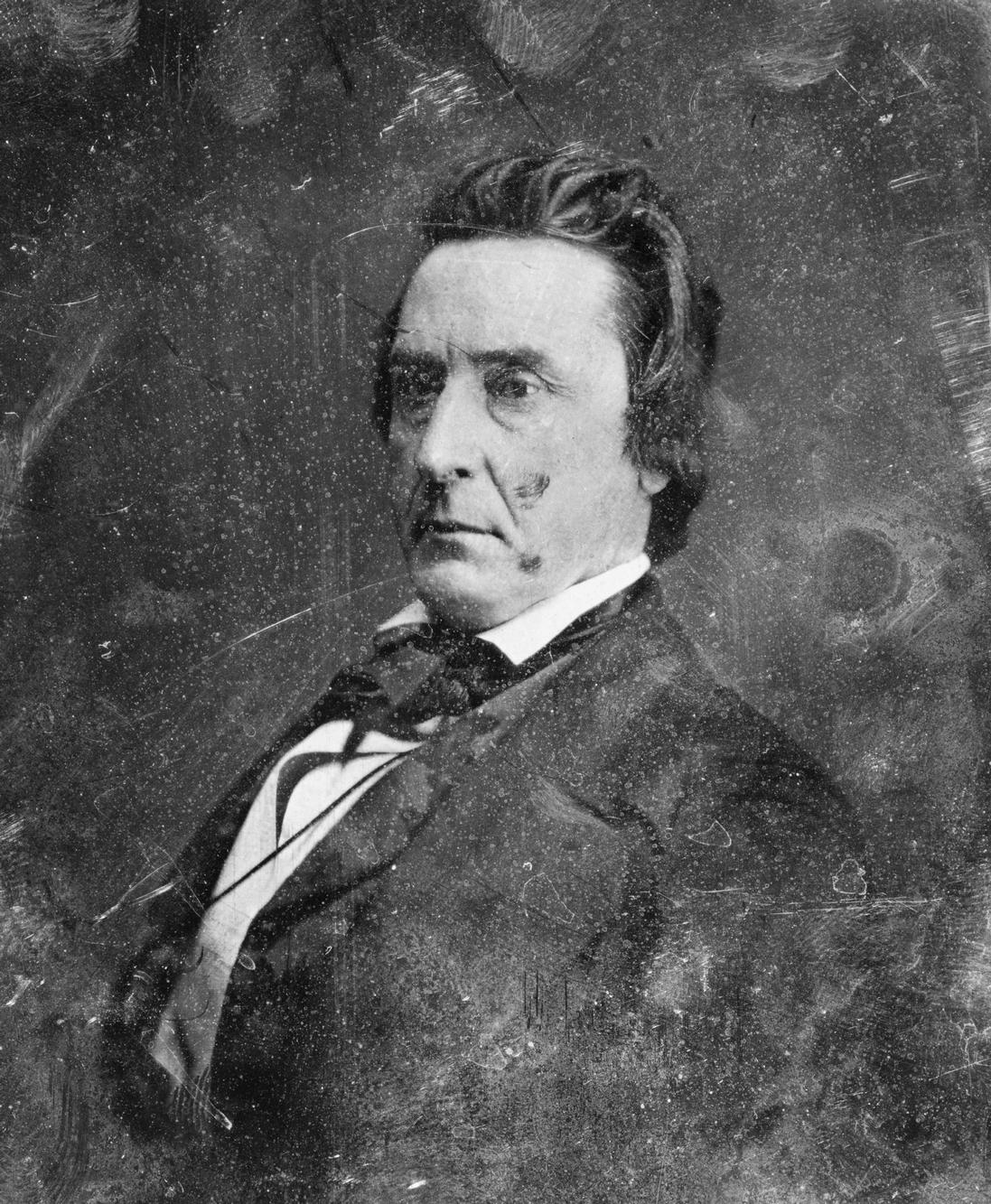
Senate President pro tempore David R. Atchison

=== House of Representatives ===
The names of representatives are preceded by their district numbers.

==== Alabama ====
▌1. John Gayle (W)
▌2. Henry W. Hilliard (W)
▌3. Sampson W. Harris (D)
▌4. Samuel W. Inge (D)
▌5. George S. Houston (D)
▌6. Williamson R. W. Cobb (D)
▌7. Franklin W. Bowdon (D)

==== Arkansas ====
▌At-large. Robert W. Johnson (D)

==== Connecticut ====
▌1. James Dixon (W)
▌2. Samuel D. Hubbard (W)
▌3. John A. Rockwell (W)
▌4. Truman Smith (W)

==== Delaware ====
▌At-large. John W. Houston (W)

==== Florida ====
▌At-large. Edward C. Cabell (W)

==== Georgia ====
▌1. Thomas Butler King (W)
▌2. Alfred Iverson Sr. (D)
▌3. John W. Jones (W)
▌4. Hugh A. Haralson (D)
▌5. John H. Lumpkin (D)
▌6. Howell Cobb (D)
▌7. Alexander H. Stephens (W)
▌8. Robert A. Toombs (W)

==== Illinois ====
▌1. Robert Smith (ID)
▌2. John A. McClernand (D)
▌3. Orlando B. Ficklin (D)
▌4. John Wentworth (D)
▌5. William A. Richardson (D), from December 6, 1847
▌6. Thomas J. Turner (D)
▌7. Abraham Lincoln (W)

==== Indiana ====
▌1. Elisha Embree (W)
▌2. Thomas J. Henley (D)
▌3. John L. Robinson (D)
▌4. Caleb B. Smith (W)
▌5. William W. Wick (D)
▌6. George G. Dunn (W)
▌7. Richard W. Thompson (W)
▌8. John Pettit (D)
▌9. Charles W. Cathcart (D)
▌10. William R. Rockhill (D)

==== Iowa ====
▌1. William Thompson (D)
▌2. Shepherd Leffler (D)

==== Kentucky ====
▌1. Linn Boyd (D)
▌2. Beverly L. Clarke (D)
▌3. Samuel O. Peyton (D)
▌4. Aylette Buckner (W)
▌5. John B. Thompson (W)
▌6. Green Adams (W)
▌7. W. Garnett Duncan (W)
▌8. Charles S. Morehead (W)
▌9. Richard French (D)
▌10. John P. Gaines (W)

==== Louisiana ====
▌1. Emile La Sére (D)
▌2. Bannon G. Thibodeaux (W)
▌3. John H. Harmanson (D)
▌4. Isaac E. Morse (D)

==== Maine ====
▌1. David Hammons (D)
▌2. Asa W. H. Clapp (D)
▌3. Hiram Belcher (W)
▌4. Franklin Clark (D)
▌5. Ephraim K. Smart (D)
▌6. James S. Wiley (D)
▌7. Hezekiah Williams (D)

==== Maryland ====
▌1. John G. Chapman (W)
▌2. J. Dixon Roman (W)
▌3. Thomas W. Ligon (D)
▌4. Robert M. McLane (D)
▌5. Alexander Evans (W)
▌6. John W. Crisfield (W)

==== Massachusetts ====
▌1. Robert C. Winthrop (W)
▌2. Daniel P. King (W)
▌3. Amos Abbott (W)
▌4. John G. Palfrey (W)
▌5. Charles Hudson (W)
▌6. George Ashmun (W)
▌7. Julius Rockwell (W)
▌8. John Quincy Adams (W), until February 23, 1848

▌Horace Mann (W), from April 3, 1848

▌9. Artemas Hale (W)
▌10. Joseph Grinnell (W)

==== Michigan ====
▌1. Robert McClelland (D)
▌2. Edward Bradley (D), until August 5, 1847

▌Charles E. Stuart (D), from December 6, 1847

▌3. Kinsley S. Bingham (D)

==== Mississippi ====
▌1. Jacob Thompson (D)
▌2. Winfield S. Featherston (D)
▌3. Patrick W. Tompkins (W)
▌4. Albert G. Brown (D)

==== Missouri ====
▌1. James B. Bowlin (D)
▌2. John Jameson (D)
▌3. James S. Green (D)
▌4. Willard P. Hall (D)
▌5. John S. Phelps (D)

==== New Hampshire ====
▌1. Amos Tuck (I)
▌2. Charles H. Peaslee (D)
▌3. James Wilson (W)
▌4. James H. Johnson (D)

==== New Jersey ====
▌1. James G. Hampton (W)
▌2. William A. Newell (W)
▌3. Joseph E. Edsall (D)
▌4. John Van Dyke (W)
▌5. Dudley S. Gregory (W)

==== New York ====
▌1. Frederick W. Lord (D)
▌2. Henry C. Murphy (D)
▌3. Henry Nicoll (D)
▌4. William B. Maclay (D)
▌5. Frederick A. Tallmadge (W)
▌6. David S. Jackson (D), until April 19, 1848

▌Horace Greeley (W), from December 4, 1848

▌7. William Nelson (W)
▌8. Cornelius Warren (W)
▌9. Daniel B. St. John (W)
▌10. Eliakim Sherrill (W)
▌11. Peter H. Silvester (W)
▌12. Gideon Reynolds (W)
▌13. John I. Slingerland (W)
▌14. Orlando Kellogg (W)
▌15. Sidney Lawrence (D)
▌16. Hugh White (W)
▌17. George Petrie (ID)
▌18. William Collins (D)
▌19. Joseph Mullin (W)
▌20. Timothy Jenkins (D)
▌21. George A. Starkweather (D)
▌22. Ausburn Birdsall (D)
▌23. William Duer (W)
▌24. Daniel Gott (W)
▌25. Harmon S. Conger (W)
▌26. William T. Lawrence (W)
▌27. John M. Holley (W), until March 8, 1848

▌Esbon Blackmar (W), from December 4, 1848

▌28. Elias B. Holmes (W)
▌29. Robert L. Rose (W)
▌30. David Rumsey Jr. (W)
▌31. Dudley Marvin (W)
▌32. Nathan K. Hall (W)
▌33. Harvey Putnam (W)
▌34. Washington Hunt (W)

==== North Carolina ====
▌1. Thomas L. Clingman (W)
▌2. Nathaniel Boyden (W)
▌3. Daniel M. Barringer (W)
▌4. Augustine H. Shepperd (W)
▌5. Abraham W. Venable (D)
▌6. John R. J. Daniel (D)
▌7. James I. McKay (D)
▌8. Richard S. Donnell (W)
▌9. David Outlaw (W)

==== Ohio ====
▌1. James J. Faran (D)
▌2. David Fisher (W)
▌3. Robert C. Schenck (W)
▌4. Richard S. Canby (W)
▌5. William Sawyer (D)
▌6. Rodolphus Dickinson (D)
▌7. Jonathan D. Morris (D)
▌8. John L. Taylor (W)
▌9. Thomas O. Edwards (W)
▌10. Daniel Duncan (W)
▌11. John K. Miller (D)
▌12. Samuel F. Vinton (W)
▌13. Thomas Ritchey (D)
▌14. Nathan Evans (W)
▌15. William Kennon Jr. (D)
▌16. John D. Cummins (D)
▌17. George Fries (D)
▌18. Samuel Lahm (D)
▌19. John Crowell (W)
▌20. Joshua R. Giddings (W)
▌21. Joseph M. Root (W)

==== Pennsylvania ====
▌1. Lewis C. Levin (A)
▌2. Joseph R. Ingersoll (W)
▌3. Charles Brown (D)
▌4. Charles J. Ingersoll (D)
▌5. John Freedley (W)
▌6. John W. Hornbeck (W), until January 16, 1848

▌Samuel A. Bridges (D), from March 6, 1848

▌7. Abraham R. McIlvaine (W)
▌8. John Strohm (W)
▌9. William Strong (D)
▌10. Richard Brodhead (D)
▌11. Chester P. Butler (W)
▌12. David Wilmot (D)
▌13. James Pollock (W)
▌14. George N. Eckert (W)
▌15. Henry Nes (W)
▌16. Jasper E. Brady (W)
▌17. John Blanchard (W)
▌18. Andrew Stewart (W)
▌19. Job Mann (D)
▌20. John Dickey (W)
▌21. Moses Hampton (W)
▌22. John W. Farrelly (W)
▌23. James Thompson (D)
▌24. Alexander Irvin (W)

==== Rhode Island ====
▌1. Robert B. Cranston (W)
▌2. Benjamin B. Thurston (D)

==== South Carolina ====
▌1. James A. Black (D), until April 3, 1848

▌Daniel Wallace (D), from June 12, 1848

▌2. Richard F. Simpson (D)
▌3. Joseph A. Woodward (D)
▌4. Alexander D. Sims (D), until November 22, 1848

▌John McQueen (D), from February 12, 1849

▌5. Armistead Burt (D)
▌6. Isaac E. Holmes (D)
▌7. Robert Rhett (D)

==== Tennessee ====
▌1. Andrew Johnson (D)
▌2. William M. Cocke (W)
▌3. John H. Crozier (W)
▌4. Hugh L. W. Hill (D)
▌5. George W. Jones (D)
▌6. James H. Thomas (D)
▌7. Meredith P. Gentry (W)
▌8. Washington Barrow (W)
▌9. Lucien B. Chase (D)
▌10. Frederick P. Stanton (D)
▌11. William T. Haskell (W)

==== Texas ====
▌1. David S. Kaufman (D)
▌2. Timothy Pilsbury (D)

==== Vermont ====
▌1. William Henry (W)
▌2. Jacob Collamer (W)
▌3. George P. Marsh (W)
▌4. Lucius B. Peck (D)

==== Virginia ====
▌1. Archibald Atkinson (D)
▌2. George Dromgoole (D), until April 27, 1847

▌Richard K. Meade (D), from August 5, 1847

▌3. Thomas S. Flournoy (W)
▌4. Thomas S. Bocock (D)
▌5. William L. Goggin (W)
▌6. John M. Botts (W)
▌7. Thomas H. Bayly (D)
▌8. Richard L. T. Beale (D)
▌9. John S. Pendleton (W)
▌10. Henry Bedinger (D)
▌11. James McDowell (D)
▌12. William B. Preston (W)
▌13. Andrew S. Fulton (W)
▌14. Robert A. Thompson (D)
▌15. William G. Brown Sr. (D)

==== Wisconsin ====
▌1. William P. Lynde (D), from June 8, 1848 (newly admitted state)
▌2. Mason C. Darling (D), from June 8, 1848 (newly admitted state)

==== Non-voting members ====
▌Wisconsin Territory. John H. Tweedy (W), until May 29, 1848

Henry H. Sibley, from October 30, 1848

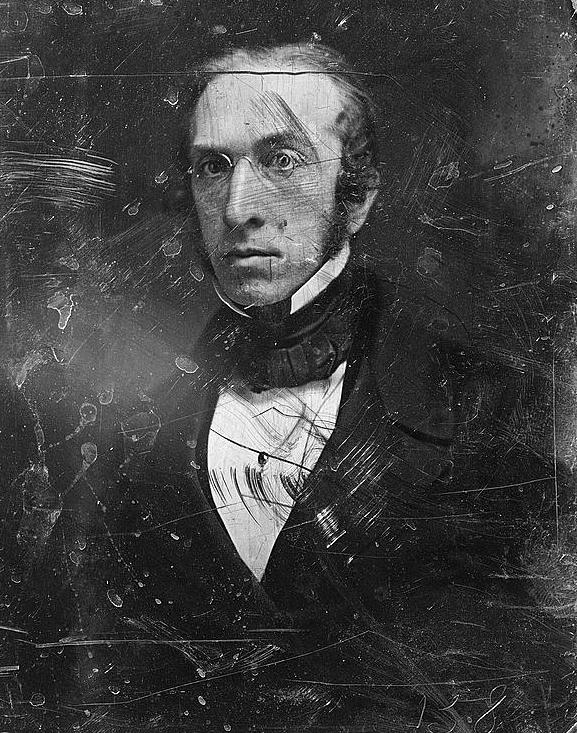
Speaker of the House Robert C. Winthrop

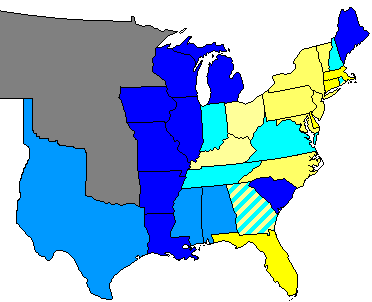
House seats by party holding plurality in state: 80+ to 100% Democratic / Up to 60% Whig; 60+ to 80% Democratic / 60+ to 80% Whig; Up to 60% Democratic / 80+ to 100% Whig

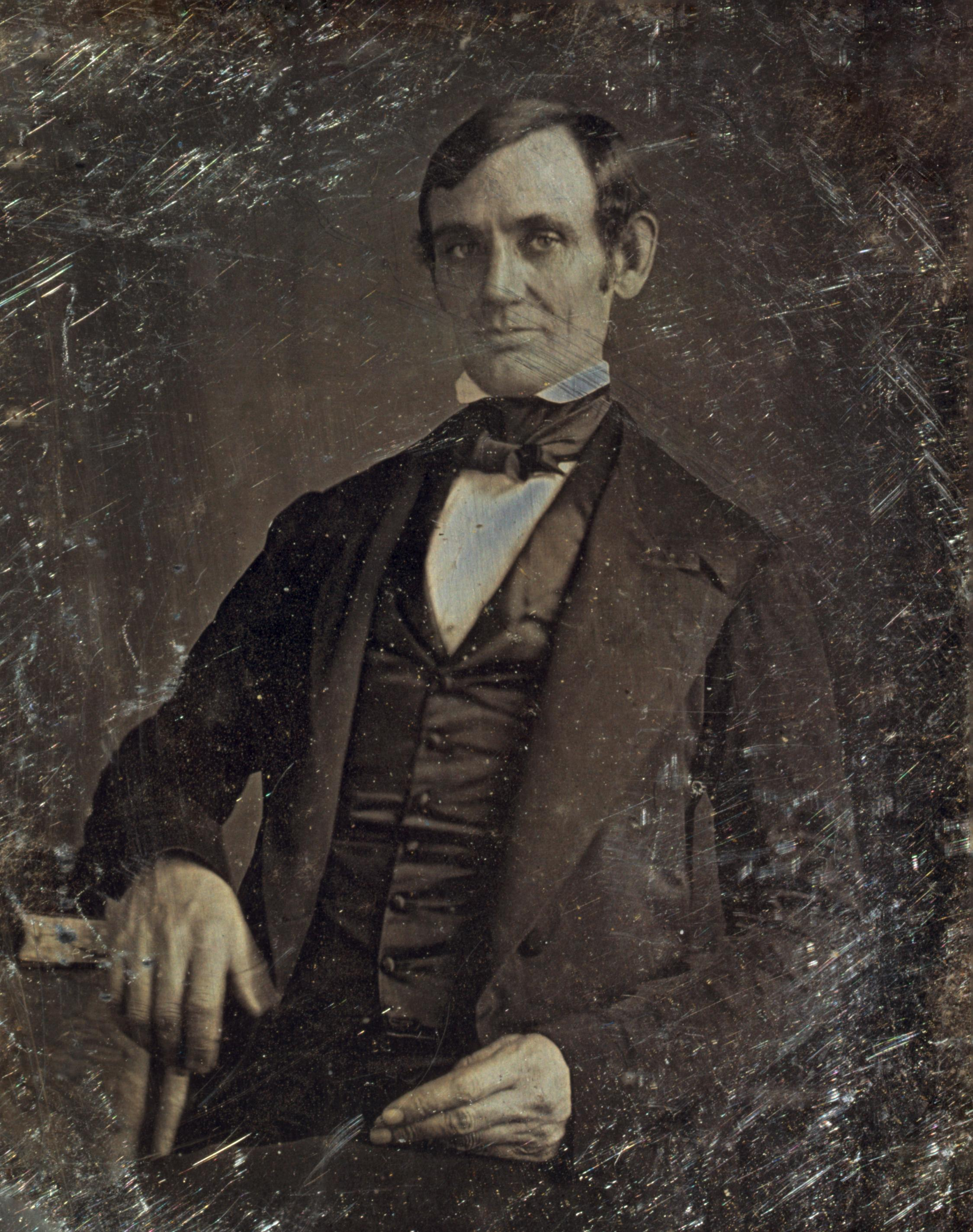
Lincoln in his late 30s as a member of the United States House of Representatives

== Changes in membership ==
The count below reflects changes from the beginning of the first session of this Congress.

=== Senate ===
- Replacements: 11
  - Democrats (D): 4 seat net gain
  - Whigs (W): no net change
- Deaths: 5
- Resignations: 6
- Interim appointments: 7
- Seats of newly admitted states: 4

Senate changes
State (class)	Vacated by	Reason for change	Successor	Date of successor's formal installation (Note: When seated or oath administered, not necessarily when service began.)
Tennessee (2)	Vacant	Failure to elect. Successor elected November 22, 1847.	John Bell (W)	Elected November 22, 1847.
Iowa (2)	Vacant	Iowa had been admitted to the Union December 28, 1846, but the legislature failed to elect due to a three-way split that prevented any candidate from earning the required number of 30 legislators' votes. First Senator elected December 7, 1848.	George Wallace Jones (D)	Elected December 7, 1848.
Iowa (3)	Vacant	Iowa had been admitted to the Union December 28, 1846, but the legislature failed to elect due to a three-way split that prevented any candidate from earning the required number of 30 legislators' votes. First Senator elected December 7, 1848.	Augustus C. Dodge (D)	Elected December 7, 1848.
Mississippi (1)	Jesse Speight (D)	Incumbent died May 1, 1847. Successor appointed August 10, 1847, and then elected January 1848.	Jefferson Davis (D)	Appointed December 5, 1847.
Connecticut (1)	Jabez W. Huntington (W)	Incumbent died November 1, 1847. Successor appointed November 11, 1847, and then elected May 1848.	Roger S. Baldwin (W)	Appointed December 5, 1847.
Maine (1)	John Fairfield (D)	Incumbent died December 24, 1847. Successor appointed January 5, 1848.	Wyman B. S. Moor (D)	Appointed January 5, 1848.
Georgia (3)	Walter T. Colquitt (D)	Incumbent resigned February 4, 1848. Successor appointed February 4, 1848, to finish the term.	Herschel V. Johnson (D)	Appointed February 4, 1848.
Arkansas (3)	Ambrose H. Sevier (D)	Incumbent resigned March 15, 1848. Successor appointed March 30, 1848, to finish the term.	Solon Borland (D)	Appointed March 30, 1848.
Arkansas (2)	Chester Ashley (D)	Incumbent died April 29, 1848. Successor appointed May 12, 1848, and elected sometime thereafter.	William K. Sebastian (D)	Elected May 12, 1848.
Wisconsin (1)	Wisconsin admitted to the Union May 29, 1848. First Senator elected June 8, 1848.		Henry Dodge (D)	Elected June 8, 1848.
Wisconsin (3)	Wisconsin admitted to the Union May 29, 1848. First Senator elected June 8, 1848.		Isaac P. Walker (D)	Elected June 8, 1848.
Michigan (1)	Lewis Cass (D)	Incumbent resigned May 29, 1848, to run for U.S. President. Successor appointed June 8, 1848.	Thomas Fitzgerald (D)	Elected June 8, 1848.
Maine (1)	Wyman B. S. Moor (D)	Interim appointee retired when successor elected June 7, 1848.	Hannibal Hamlin (D)	Elected June 7, 1848.
Kentucky (3)	John J. Crittenden (W)	Incumbent resigned June 12, 1848, to run for Governor of Kentucky. Successor appointed June 23, 1848, and elected sometime thereafter.	Thomas Metcalfe (W)	Elected June 23, 1848.
Alabama (3)	Arthur P. Bagby (D)	Incumbent resigned June 16, 1848, to become U.S. Minister to Russia. Successor elected July 1, 1848.	William R. King (D)	Elected July 1, 1848.
Alabama (2)	Dixon H. Lewis (D)	Incumbent died October 25, 1848. Successor elected November 25, 1848.	Benjamin Fitzpatrick (D)	Elected November 25, 1848.
Delaware (1)	John M. Clayton (W)	Incumbent resigned February 23, 1849, to become U.S. Secretary of State. Successor elected February 23, 1849.	John Wales (W)	Elected February 23, 1849.

=== House of Representatives ===
- Replacements: 10
  - Democrats (D): no net change
  - Whigs (W): no net change
- Deaths: 7
- Resignations: 0
- Contested election: 1
- Seats of newly admitted states: 2
- Total seats with changes: 12

House changes
District	Vacated by	Reason for change	Successor	Date of successor's formal installation
Illinois 5th	Vacant	Representative Stephen A. Douglas resigned at end of previous congress.	William A. Richardson (D)	Seated December 6, 1847
Virginia 2nd	George Dromgoole (D)	Incumbent died April 27, 1847.	Richard K. Meade (D)	Seated August 5, 1847
Michigan 2nd	Edward Bradley (D)	Incumbent died August 5, 1847.	Charles E. Stuart (D)	Seated December 6, 1847
Pennsylvania 6th	John W. Hornbeck (W)	Incumbent died January 16, 1848.	Samuel A. Bridges (D)	Seated March 6, 1848
Massachusetts 8th	John Quincy Adams (W)	Incumbent died February 23, 1848.	Horace Mann (W)	Seated April 3, 1848
New York 27th	John M. Holley (W)	Incumbent died March 8, 1848.	Esbon Blackmar (W)	Seated December 4, 1848
South Carolina 1st	James A. Black (D)	Incumbent died April 3, 1848.	Daniel Wallace (D)	Seated June 12, 1848
New York 6th	David S. Jackson (D)	James Monroe contested seat after which the House declared the seat vacant April 19, 1848.	Horace Greeley (W)	Seated December 4, 1848
Wisconsin 1st	Wisconsin admitted into the Union May 29, 1848, and seat remained vacant until June 8, 1848.		William P. Lynde (D)	Seated June 8, 1848
Wisconsin 2nd	Wisconsin admitted into the Union May 29, 1848, and seat remained vacant until June 8, 1848.		Mason C. Darling (D)	Seated June 8, 1848
Wisconsin Territory At-large	John H. Tweedy (W)	Incumbent was disqualified May 29, 1848, after the portion of territory he resided in achieved statehood.	Henry H. Sibley	Seated October 30, 1848
South Carolina 4th	Alexander D. Sims (D)	Incumbent died November 22, 1848.	John McQueen (D)	Seated February 12, 1849

== Committees ==
Lists of committees and their party leaders.

=== Senate ===
- Agriculture (Chairman: Daniel Sturgeon)
- Audit and Control the Contingent Expenses of the Senate (Chairman: Alpheus Felch then Isaac P. Walker)
- Claims (Chairman: Moses Norris Jr.)
- Commerce (Chairman: John Adams Dix)
- Distributing Public Revenue Among the States (Select)
- District of Columbia (Chairman: Herschel V. Johnson)
- Expedition of John C. Fremont (Select)
- Enrolled Bills (Chairman: Thomas J. Rusk)
- Finance (Chairman: Charles G. Atherton)
- Foreign Relations (Chairman: Ambrose H. Sevier then Edward A. Hannegan then Thomas Hart Benton)
- Indian Affairs (Chairman: David R. Atchison)
- Judiciary (Chairman: Andrew P. Butler)
- Library (Chairman: James A. Pearce)
- Manufactures (Chairman: Daniel S. Dickinson)
- Memorial of Certain Cherokee Claimants (Select)
- Military Affairs (Chairman: Lewis Cass then Thomas Hart Benton)
- Militia (Chairman: Thomas J. Rusk)
- Monuments to Deceased Senators (Select)
- Naval Affairs (Chairman: David Levy Yulee)
- Oregon Railroad (Select)
- Ordnance and War Ships (Select)
- Patents and the Patent Office (Chairman: James D. Westcott)
- Pensions (Chairman: Henry Johnson)
- Post Office and Post Roads (Chairman: John M. Niles)
- Printing (Chairman: Simon Cameron)
- Private Land Claims (Chairman: Solomon W. Downs)
- Public Buildings and Grounds (Chairman: Robert M.T. Hunter)
- Public Lands (Chairman: Sidney Breese then Alpheus Felch)
- Retired List for the Army and the Navy (Select)
- Retrenchment (Chairman: Hopkins L. Turney)
- Seventh Census (Select)
- Revolutionary Claims (Chairman: Jesse D. Bright)
- Rivers and Harbors Convention in Chicago (Select)
- Roads and Canals (Chairman: Edward A. Hannegan)
- Tariff Bill of 1828 (Special)
- Tariff Regulation (Select)
- Territories (Chairman: Stephen A. Douglas)
- Whole

=== House of Representatives ===
- Accounts (Chairman: Daniel P. King)
- Agriculture (Chairman: Hugh White)
- Claims (Chairman: Joseph R. Ingersoll)
- Commerce (Chairman: Washington Hunt)
- District of Columbia (Chairman: John G. Chapman)
- Elections (Chairman: Richard W. Thompson)
- Engraving (Chairman: Lewis Charles Levin)
- Enrolled Bills (Chairman: James G. Hampton)
- Expenditures in the Navy Department (Chairman: Patrick W. Tompkins)
- Expenditures in the Post Office Department (Chairman: James Wilson)
- Expenditures in the State Department (Chairman: Daniel M. Barringer)
- Expenditures in the Treasury Department (Chairman: Joseph M. Root)
- Expenditures in the War Department (Chairman: John H. Crozier)
- Expenditures on Public Buildings (Chairman: Edward Carrington Cabell)
- Foreign Affairs (Chairman: John A. McClernand)
- Indian Affairs (Chairman: Daniel M. Barringer)
- Invalid Pensions (Chairman: Andrew S. Fulton)
- Judiciary (Chairman: Joseph R. Ingersoll)
- Manufactures (Chairman: Andrew Stewart)
- Mileage (Chairman: Hiram Belcher)
- Military Affairs (Chairman: John M. Botts)
- Militia (Chairman: John B. Thompson)
- Naval Affairs (Chairman: Thomas Butler King)
- Patents (Chairman: John W. Farrelly)
- Printing (Chairman: Harmon S. Conger)
- Private Land Claims (Chairman: John Gayle)
- Post Office and Post Roads (Chairman: William L. Goggin)
- Public Buildings and Grounds (Chairman: John W. Houston)
- Public Expenditures (Chairman: Thomas L. Clingman)
- Public Lands (Chairman: Jacob Collamer)
- Revisal and Unfinished Business (Chairman: Henry Nes)
- Revolutionary Claims (Chairman: Daniel P. King)
- Revolutionary Pensions (Chairman: William M. Cocke)
- Roads and Canals (Chairman: Robert C. Schenck)
- Rules (Select)
- Standards of Official Conduct
- Territories (Chairman: Caleb B. Smith)
- Ways and Means (Chairman: Samuel F. Vinton)
- Whole

=== Joint committees ===
- Enrolled Bills
- The Library
- Printing

== Employees ==
- Librarian of Congress: John Silva Meehan

=== Senate ===
- Chaplain: Henry Slicer (Methodist)
- Secretary: Asbury Dickins
- Sergeant at Arms: Robert Beale

=== House of Representatives ===
- Chaplain: William T.S. Sprole (Presbyterian), until December 6, 1847
  - Ralph Gurley (Presbyterian), elected December 6, 1847
- Clerk: Benjamin B. French, until December 8, 1847
  - Thomas J. Campbell, elected December 8, 1847
- Doorkeeper: Robert E. Horner, elected December 8, 1847
- Postmaster: John M. Johnson
- Sergeant at Arms: Newton Lane, until December 8, 1847
  - Nathan Sergeant, elected December 8, 1847

== See also ==
- 1846 United States elections (elections leading to this Congress)
  - 1846–47 United States Senate elections
  - 1846–47 United States House of Representatives elections
- 1848 United States elections (elections during this Congress, leading to the next Congress)
  - 1848 United States presidential election
  - 1848–49 United States Senate elections
  - 1848–49 United States House of Representatives elections
