= James A. Black =

American politician

James Augustus Black

Member of the U.S. House of Representatives from South Carolina's 1st district
- In office March 4, 1843 – April 3, 1848
- Preceded by: Isaac E. Holmes
- Succeeded by: Daniel Wallace

Member of the South Carolina House of Representatives from Abbeville District
- In office November 26, 1832 – December 19, 1835
- In office November 27, 1826 – January 30, 1828

Personal details
- Born: 1793 Ninety-Six District, South Carolina
- Died: April 3, 1848 (aged 54–55) Washington, D.C.
- Resting place: Columbia, South Carolina
- Party: Democratic
- Profession: cotton dealer

Military service
- Allegiance: United States of America
- Branch/service: United States Army
- Years of service: 1812–1815
- Rank: Lieutenant
- Battles/wars: War of 1812

James Augustus Black (1793 – April 3, 1848) was a slave owner, manufacturer, cotton broker, and U.S. representative from South Carolina.

== Early life and military service ==
Black was born on his father's plantation in the Ninety-Six District, near Abbeville, South Carolina. He attended the common schools on his father's plantation.

Black served in the army during the War of 1812. He was appointed a second lieutenant in the Eighth Infantry on March 12, 1812. He was promoted to first lieutenant on December 2, 1813. After the war, Black was honorably discharged (June 15, 1815).

== Early career and a taste for politics ==
Soon after returning to civilian life, Black co-founded the Kings Mountain Iron Works, which was involved in the mining of iron ore in areas near present-day Cherokee Falls, South Carolina.

Black eventually moved to Georgia, settling in Savannah, where he engaged in the buying and selling of cotton. Black served as tax collector of Chatham County, Georgia for a time, before he returned to South Carolina.

== Political career ==
This time, Black settled in Columbia, where he worked for a time as a cashier of the State Bank branch. He ran for, and twice won, a seat in the South Carolina House of Representatives, serving from 1826 to 1828; and again, 1832–1835.

Beginning in 1843, Black, a Democrat, was elected to three consecutive terms (the Twenty-eighth, Twenty-ninth, and Thirtieth) United States Congresses. Black was chairman of the Committee on the Militia during the Mexican–American War.

== Death ==
Black served in Congress from March 4, 1843, until his death April 3, 1848 in Washington, D.C. while still in office. He is interred in the graveyard of the First Presbyterian Church, Columbia, South Carolina. A cenotaph in his honor was erected at the Congressional Cemetery.

== See also ==
- List of members of the United States Congress who died in office (1790–1899)

== Sources ==
- United States Congress. "James A. Black (id: B000501)". Biographical Directory of the United States Congress.

U.S. House of Representatives
Preceded by Isaac E. Holmes	Member of the U.S. House of Representatives from South Carolina's 1st congressional district 1843–1848	Succeeded by Daniel Wallace
