= Daniel Wallace (politician) =

American politician

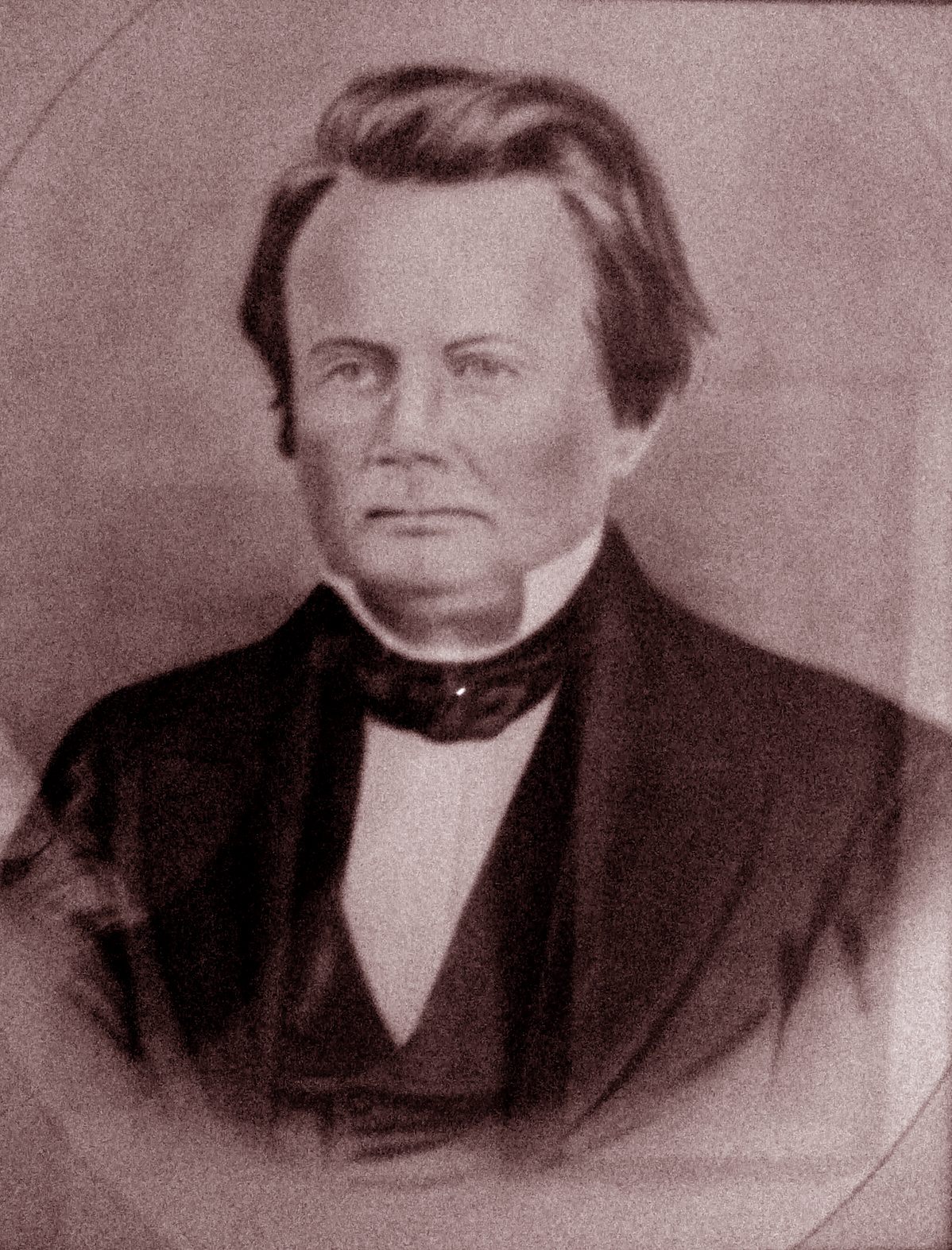

Member of the U.S. House of Representatives from South Carolina's 1st district
- In office June 12, 1848 – March 3, 1853
- Preceded by: James A. Black
- Succeeded by: John McQueen

Member of the South Carolina House of Representatives from Union County
- In office November 23, 1846 – December 17, 1847

Personal details
- Born: May 9, 1801 Laurens, South Carolina, U.S.
- Died: May 12, 1859 (aged 58) Jonesville, South Carolina, U.S.
- Resting place: Union, South Carolina, U.S.
- Party: Democratic
- Profession: lawyer, planter

Military service
- Allegiance: United States
- Branch/service: South Carolina militia
- Rank: Major General

Daniel Wallace (May 9, 1801 – May 13, 1859) was a U.S. representative from South Carolina.

Born near Laurens, South Carolina, he moved to Union County in 1833. He was a major general of the State militia. He studied law and engaged in agricultural pursuits. After being admitted to the bar, the practiced law in Union and Jonesville, Union County, South Carolina. He was elected to the State house of representatives in 1846 and served until 1847.

Wallace was elected as a Democrat to the Thirtieth Congress to fill the vacancy caused by the death of James A. Black. He was reelected to the Thirty-first and Thirty-second Congresses and served from June 12, 1848, to March 3, 1853.

After leaving Congress, he resumed his agricultural pursuits. He died in Jonesville, South Carolina, May 13, 1859 and was interred in Old Presbyterian Cemetery, Union, South Carolina. His son was General William Henry Wallace of the Confederate States Army, Speaker of the South Carolina House of Representatives, and Circuit Judge.

U.S. House of Representatives
Preceded by James A. Black	Member of the U.S. House of Representatives from South Carolina's 1st congressional district 1848–1853	Succeeded by John McQueen
