= Alexander D. Sims =

American politician (1803–1848)

Alexander Dromgoole Sims

Member of the U.S. House of Representatives from South Carolina's 4th district
- In office March 4, 1845 – November 22, 1848
- Preceded by: John Campbell
- Succeeded by: John McQueen

Member of the South Carolina House of Representatives from Darlington District
- In office November 23, 1840 – December 19, 1843

Personal details
- Born: June 12, 1803 near Randals Ordinary, Virginia
- Died: November 22, 1848 (aged 45) Kingstree, South Carolina
- Resting place: Darlington, South Carolina
- Party: Democratic
- Education: University of North Carolina; Union College
- Profession: lawyer

Alexander Dromgoole Sims (June 12, 1803 – November 22, 1848) was a U.S. representative from South Carolina.

Born near Randals Ordinary, Virginia, Sims was a nephew of George Coke Dromgoole. He attended the rural schools of his native county and at the age of sixteen entered the University of North Carolina at Chapel Hill. He graduated from Union College in Schenectady, New York, in 1823. Subsequently, Sims read law with General Dromgoole in Brunswick County, Virginia, and later was admitted to practice.

Sims moved to South Carolina in 1826 and settled in Darlington. He assumed charge of Darlington Academy in 1827. He was admitted to the bar of South Carolina in 1829 and practiced in Darlington. He also engaged in literary pursuits. He served as member of the South Carolina House of Representatives from 1840 to 1843.

Sims was elected as a Democrat to the Twenty-ninth and Thirtieth Congresses and served from March 4, 1845, until his death. He had been reelected in 1848 to the Thirty-first Congress. John McQueen was elected to replace him.

Sims died in Kingstree, South Carolina, on November 22, 1848, and was interred in First Baptist Cemetery, in Darlington, South Carolina.

== See also ==
- List of members of the United States Congress who died in office (1790–1899)

== Sources ==
- United States Congress. "Alexander D. Sims (id: S000438)". Biographical Directory of the United States Congress.

U.S. House of Representatives
Preceded by John Campbell	Member of the U.S. House of Representatives from South Carolina's 4th congressional district 1845–1848	Succeeded by John McQueen
