= 1850–51 United States House of Representatives elections =

House elections for the 32nd U.S. Congress

- August 5, 1850 – November 4, 1851

All 233 seats in the United States House of Representatives 117 seats needed for a majority
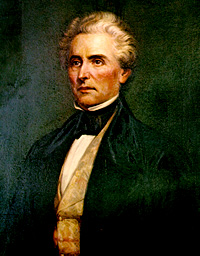

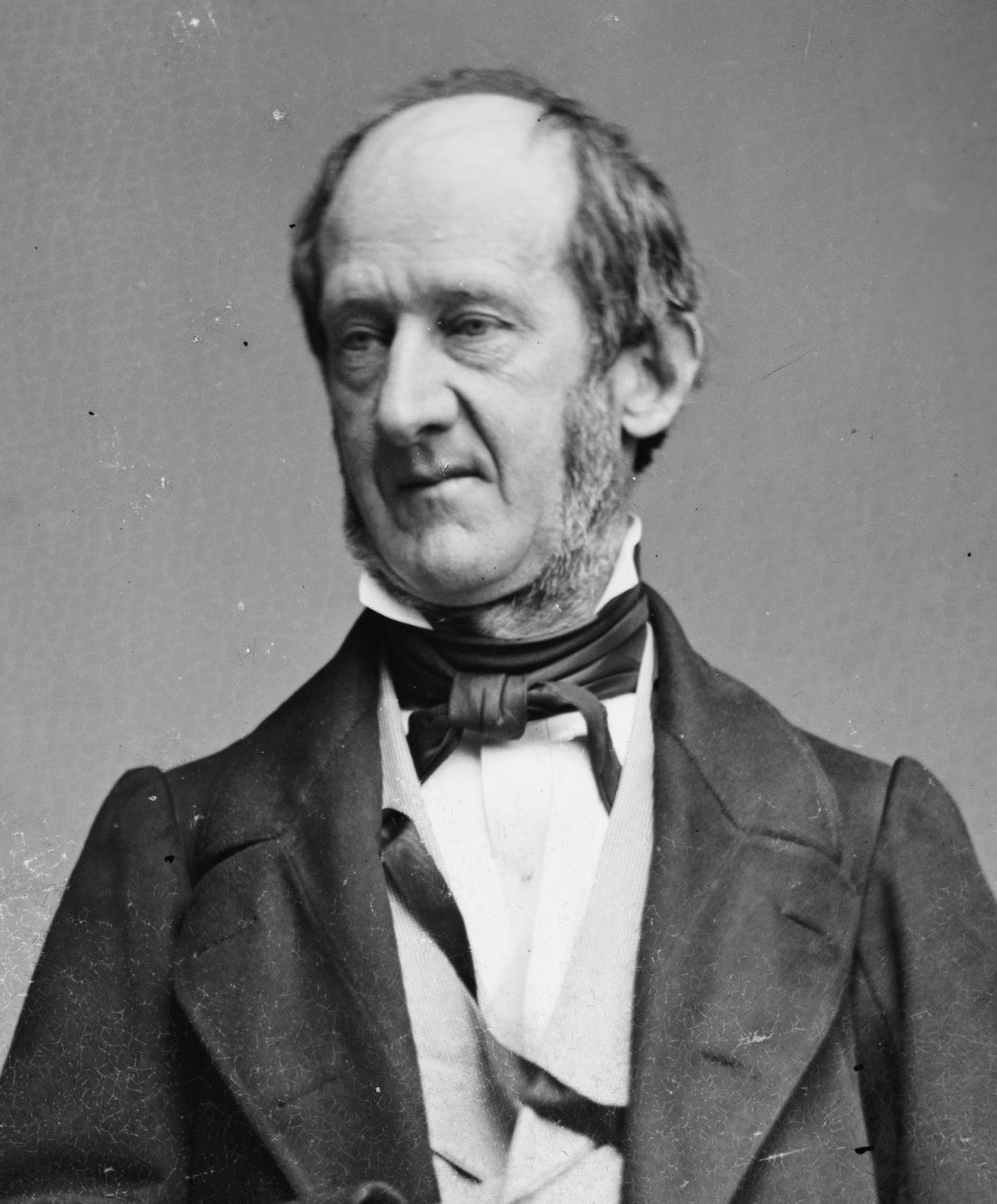
	Majority party	Minority party
Leader	Linn Boyd	Edward Stanly
Party	Democratic	Whig
Leader's seat	Kentucky 1st	North Carolina 8th
Last election	113 seats, 44.11%	106 seats, 44.82%
Seats won	123 (Note: Includes one Anti-Benton Democrat, one Benton Democrat, and one Secessionist Democrat)	83 (Note: Includes one Secessionist Whig)
Seat change	▲10	▼21
Popular vote	1,168,584	1,072,152
Percentage	44.85%	41.15%
Swing	▲0.74 pp	▼3.67 pp
	Third party	Fourth party
Party	Union	Southern Rights
Last election	Pre-creation	Pre-creation
Seats won	14 (Note: Includes three Union Democrats and two Union Whigs)	5 (Note: Includes two Southern Rights Democrats)
Seat change	▲14	▲5
Popular vote	126,437	102,460
Percentage	4.85%	3.93%
Swing	New Party	New Party
	Fifth party	Sixth party
Party	Free Soil	Independent
Last election	8 seats, 8.65%	3 seats, 1.42%
Seats won	4	4 (Note: Includes three Independent Democrats and one Independent Whig.)
Seat change	▼4	▲1
Popular vote	82,221	70,262
Percentage	3.16%	1.43%
Swing	▼5.49 pp	▲0.01 pp
- Results: Democratic gain Whig gain Free Soil gain Democratic hold Whig hold Free Soil hold Union gain Southern Rights gain Independent gain
Speaker before election
Howell Cobb
Democratic
Elected Speaker
Linn Boyd
Democratic

States held the 1850–51 United States House of Representatives elections between August 5, 1850, and November 4, 1851, during President Millard Fillmore's term. Each state set a date for its elections to the House of Representatives before the first session of the 32nd United States Congress convened on December 1, 1851. Thirty-one states held elections, for 233 House seats.

After previously winning a plurality, the Democrats won a majority over the rival Whigs. Incumbent Whig President Millard Fillmore, who had succeeded to the Presidency in July 1850 after the death of more charismatic General Zachary Taylor, lacked a strong political base. The Compromise of 1850, which admitted California alone as a free state in exchange for concessions to slave state interests, began integration of the Mexican Cession. It appeared in the short term that Congress had politically feasible options to contain sectionalism and to reduce tensions over expanding slavery in the Western United States. This optimism soon would prove unfounded.

In the South, two short-lived minor parties formed, one supporting, and the other opposing, the Compromise of 1850. The supporting Union Party won 10 seats, while the opposing Southern Rights Party won three. The Free Soil Party, which opposed the expansion of slavery into the Western territories, lost seats and was reduced to four Representatives.

== Election summaries ==
↓
123	4	5	14	4	83
Democratic	(Note: Includes 3 Independent Democrats and 1 Independent Whig.)	(Note: Southern Rights had 5 seats.)	(Note: Union had 14 seats.)	(Note: Free Soil had 4 seats.)	Whig

State	Type	Date	Total seats	Democratic		Free Soil		Southern Rights		Union		Whig	
State	Type	Date	Total seats	Seats	Change	Seats	Change	Seats	Change	Seats	Change	Seats	Change
Iowa	District	August 5, 1850	2	2	Steady	0	Steady	0	Steady	0	Steady	0	Steady
Missouri	District	August 5, 1850	5	2 (Note: Includes one Anti-Benton Democrat and one Benton Democrat)	▼3	0	Steady	0	Steady	0	Steady	3	▲3
Vermont	District	September 3, 1850	4	1 (Note: One Democrat was backed by Free Soil)	Steady	0	Steady	0	Steady	0	Steady	3	Steady
Maine	District	September 9, 1850	7	5	Steady	0	Steady	0	Steady	0	Steady	2	Steady
Florida	At-large	October 7, 1850	1	0	Steady	0	Steady	0	Steady	0	Steady	1	Steady
Ohio	District	October 8, 1850	21	11 (Note: Includes one Independent Democrat.)	Steady	1	▼1	0	Steady	0	Steady	9	▲1
Pennsylvania	District	October 8, 1850	24 (Note: There was 1 Know-Nothing in the 31st Congress.)	15 (Note: One Democrat was backed by Free Soil)	▲6	0	▼1	0	Steady	0	Steady	9 (Note: One Whig was backed by Free Soil)	▼4
South Carolina	District	October 14–15, 1850	7	7	Steady	0	Steady	0	Steady	0	Steady	0	Steady
Illinois	District	November 5, 1850 (Election Day) (Note: In 1845, Congress passed a law providing for a uniform date for choosing presidential electors. Congressional elections were unaffected by this law, but the date was gradually adopted by the states for congressional elections as well.)	7	6	Steady	0	Steady	0	Steady	0	Steady	1	Steady
Michigan	District	November 5, 1850 (Election Day)	3	1	▼1	0	Steady	0	Steady	0	Steady	2 (Note: Two Whigs were backed by Free Soil)	▲1
New Jersey	District	November 5, 1850 (Election Day)	5	4	▲3	0	Steady	0	Steady	0	Steady	1	▼3
New York	District	November 5, 1850 (Election Day)	34	17	▲16	0	▼1	0	Steady	0	Steady	17	▼15
Wisconsin	District	November 5, 1850 (Election Day)	3	2	▲1	1 (Note: One Free Soil was backed by the Whigs)	Steady	0	Steady	0	Steady	0	▼1
Massachusetts	District	November 11, 1850	10 (Note: One seat, Massachusetts's 4th congressional district, had been vacant during the entire 31st Congress.)	1	▲1	2	▲1	0	Steady	0	Steady	7	▼1
Delaware	At-large	November 12, 1850	1	1	▲1	0	Steady	0	Steady	0	Steady	0	▼1
Late elections (after the March 4, 1851 beginning of the term)
New Hampshire	District	March 11, 1851	4	2	Steady	0	▼1	0	Steady	0	Steady	2	▲1
Rhode Island	District	April 2, 1851	2	1	▲1	0	Steady	0	Steady	0	Steady	1	▼1
Connecticut	District	April 7, 1851	4	3	▲1	0	▼1	0	Steady	0	Steady	1	Steady
Alabama	District	August 4, 1851	7	0	▼5	0	Steady	2 (Note: Includes two Southern Rights Democrats)	▲2	5 (Note: Includes three Union Democrats and two Union Whigs)	▲5	0	▼2
Arkansas	At-large	August 4, 1851	1	1	Steady	0	Steady	0	Steady	0	Steady	0	Steady
Indiana	District	August 4, 1851	10	8	Steady	0	▼1	0	Steady	0	Steady	2	▲1
Kentucky	District	August 4, 1851	10	5	▲1	0	Steady	0	Steady	0	Steady	5	▼1
Texas	District	August 4, 1851	2	2	Steady	0	Steady	0	Steady	0	Steady	0	Steady
North Carolina	District	August 7, 1851	9	3 (Note: Includes one Seccionist Democrat)	Steady	0	Steady	0	Steady	0	Steady	6 (Note: Includes one Seccionist Whig)	Steady
Tennessee	District	August 7, 1851	11	7	Steady	0	Steady	0	Steady	0	Steady	4	Steady
California	At-large	September 3, 1851	2 (Note: There was 1 Independent in the 31st Congress.)	2	▲1	0	Steady	0	Steady	0	Steady	0	Steady
Maryland	District	October 1, 1851	6	2	▼1	0	Steady	0	Steady	0	Steady	4 (Note: Includes 1 Independent Whig.)	▲1
Georgia	District	October 6, 1851	8	0	▼4	0	Steady	2	▲2	6	▲6	0	▼4
Virginia	District	October 23, 1851	15	13	Steady	0	Steady	0	Steady	0	Steady	2	Steady
Mississippi	District	November 3–4, 1851	4	0	▼4	0	Steady	1	▲1	3	▲3	0	Steady
Louisiana	District	November 4, 1851	4	2	▼1	0	Steady	0	Steady	0	Steady	2	▲1
Total			233	126 (Note: Includes three Independent Democrats from Ohio, Tennessee, and Wisconsin.) 54.08%	▲12	4 1.72%	▼5	5 2.15%	▲5	14 6.01%	▲15	84 36.05%	▼26

Popular vote
Democratic	43.31%
Whig	41.89%
Union	4.69%
Southern Rights	4.13%
Free Soil	3.12%
Independent	2.79%
Others	0.07%

House seats
Democratic	50.65%
Whig	35.06%
Union	6.06%
Southern Rights	3.46%
Free Soil	3.03%
Independent	1.73%

One district in Massachusetts had been vacant in the 31st Congress. No new seats were added.

The previous election had 1 Know-Nothing and 1 Independent.

== Special elections ==
=== 31st Congress ===
- Iowa's 1st congressional district: 1850
- New Hampshire's 3rd congressional district: 1850
- Ohio's 6th congressional district: 1851
- Louisiana's 3rd congressional district: 1850
- Massachusetts's 1st congressional district: 1850

== Alabama ==
Elections were held August 4, 1851, after the March 4, 1851 beginning of the term, but before the House first convened in December 1851.

District	Incumbent			This race	
District	Member	Party	First elected	Results	Candidates
Alabama 1	William J. Alston	Whig	1849	Incumbent retired. Southern Rights gain.	▌ ✓ John Bragg (Southern Rights) 58.81%; ▌Charles Langdon (Union) 41.19%
Alabama 2	Henry W. Hilliard	Whig	1845	Incumbent retired. Unionist gain.	▌ ✓ James Abercrombie (Union) 56.24%; ▌ John Cochran (Southern Rights) 43.76%
Alabama 3	Sampson W. Harris	Democratic	1847	Incumbent re-elected as a Southern Rights. Southern Rights gain.	▌ ✓ Sampson W. Harris (Southern Rights) 52.75%; ▌William S. Mudd (Union) 47.25%
Alabama 4	Samuel W. Inge	Democratic	1847	Incumbent retired. Unionist gain.	▌ ✓ William R. Smith (Union) 50.30%; ▌ John Erwin (Southern Rights) 49.70%
Alabama 5	David Hubbard	Democratic	1849	Incumbent lost re-election as a Southern Rights. Unionist gain.	▌ ✓ George S. Houston (Union) 52.73%; ▌ David Hubbard (Southern Rights) 47.27%
Alabama 6	Williamson R. W. Cobb	Democratic	1847	Incumbent re-elected as a Unionist. Unionist gain.	▌ ✓ Williamson R. W. Cobb (Union) 74.00%; ▌ Robert Murphy (Southern Rights) 26.00%
Alabama 7	Franklin W. Bowdon	Democratic	1846	Incumbent retired. Unionist gain.	▌ ✓ Alexander White (Union) 51.68%; ▌ Samuel F. Rice (Southern Rights) 48.32%

== Arkansas ==
The election was held August 4, 1851, after the March 4, 1851 beginning of the term, but before the House first convened in December 1851.

District	Incumbent			This race	
District	Member	Party	First elected	Results	Candidates
Arkansas at-large	Robert W. Johnson	Democratic	1846	Incumbent re-elected.	▌ ✓ Robert W. Johnson (Democratic) 57.4%; ▌John Preston (Whig) 42.6%

== California ==
California's members were elected late, at-large statewide, September 3, 1851. There were nevertheless seated with the rest of the House at the beginning of the first session.

District	Incumbent			This race	
District	Member	Party	First elected	Results	Candidates
California at-large 2 seats	George W. Wright	Independent	1849	Incumbent retired. Democratic gain.	(Elected on a general ticket): ▌ ✓ Edward C. Marshall (Democratic) 27.16%; ▌ ✓ Joseph W. McCorkle (Democratic) 26.77%; ▌Edward J. Kewen (Whig) 23.70%; ▌Benjamin J. Moore (Whig) 22.37%
California at-large 2 seats	Edward Gilbert	Democratic	1849	Incumbent retired. Democratic hold.	(Elected on a general ticket): ▌ ✓ Edward C. Marshall (Democratic) 27.16%; ▌ ✓ Joseph W. McCorkle (Democratic) 26.77%; ▌Edward J. Kewen (Whig) 23.70%; ▌Benjamin J. Moore (Whig) 22.37%

== Connecticut ==
Elections were held April 7, 1851, after the March 4, 1851 beginning of the term, but before the House first convened in December 1851.

District	Incumbent			This race	
District	Member	Party	First elected	Results	Candidates
Connecticut 1	Loren P. Waldo	Democratic	1849	Incumbent lost re-election. Whig gain.	▌ ✓ Charles Chapman (Whig) 48.8%; ▌Loren P. Waldo (Democratic) 48.5%; ▌Timothy Cowles (Free Soil) 2.6%
Connecticut 2	Walter Booth	Free Soil	1849	Incumbent lost re-election. Democratic gain.	▌ ✓ Colin M. Ingersoll (Democratic) 49.6%; ▌James F. Babcock (Whig) 45.9%; ▌Walter Booth (Free Soil) 2.6%
Connecticut 3	Chauncey F. Cleveland	Democratic	1849	Incumbent re-elected.	▌ ✓ Chauncey F. Cleveland (Democratic) 50.9%; ▌John C. Ames (Whig) 49.3%; ▌Ephraim Williams (Free Soil) 1.7%
Connecticut 4	Thomas B. Butler	Whig	1849	Incumbent lost re-election. Democratic gain.	▌ ✓ Origen S. Seymour (Democratic) 49.3%; ▌Thomas B. Butler (Whig) 48.4%; ▌Lewis Beers Jr. (Free Soil) 2.3%

== Delaware ==
The election was held November 12, 1850.

District	Incumbent			This race	
District	Member	Party	First elected	Results	Candidates
Delaware at-large	John W. Houston	Whig	1844	Incumbent retired. Democratic gain.	▌ ✓ George R. Riddle (Democratic) 49.21%; ▌George B. Rodney (Whig) 48.24%; ▌Francis D. Wait (Temperance) 2.54%

== Florida ==
The election was held October 7, 1850.

District	Incumbent			This race	
District	Member	Party	First elected	Results	Candidates
Florida at-large	Edward C. Cabell	Whig	1845	Incumbent re-elected.	▌ ✓ Edward C. Cabell (Whig) 52.80%; ▌John Beard (Democratic) 47.20%

== Georgia ==
Elections were held October 6, 1851.

District	Incumbent			This race	
District	Member	Party	First elected	Results	Candidates
Georgia 1	Joseph W. Jackson	Democratic	1850	Incumbent re-elected. Southern Rights gain.	▌ ✓ Joseph W. Jackson (Southern Rights) 51.67%; ▌Charles H. Hopkins (Constitutional Union) 48.34%
Georgia 2	Marshall Johnson Wellborn	Democratic	1848	Incumbent retired. Constitutional Union gain.	▌ ✓ James Johnson (Constitutional Union) 53.72%; ▌Henry L. Benning (Southern Rights) 46.28%
Georgia 3	Allen F. Owen	Whig	1848	Incumbent retired. Southern Rights gain.	▌ ✓ Jack Bailey (Southern Rights) 50.67%; ▌Absalom H. Chappell (Constitutional Union) 49.33%
Georgia 4	Hugh A. Haralson	Democratic	1842	Incumbent retired. Constitutional Union gain.	▌ ✓ Charles Murphey (Constitutional Union) 58.05%; ▌John P. Stell (Southern Rights) 41.95%
Georgia 5	Thomas C. Hackett	Democratic	1848	Incumbent retired. Constitutional Union gain.	▌ ✓ Elijah W. Chastain (Constitutional Union) 64.98%; ▌William H. Stiles (Southern Rights) 35.02%
Georgia 6	Howell Cobb	Democratic	1842	Incumbent retired. Constitutional Union gain.	▌ ✓ Junius Hillyer (Constitutional Union) 71.11%; ▌Thomas F. Jones (Southern Rights) 28.90%
Georgia 7	Alexander H. Stephens	Whig	1843	Incumbent re-elected as a Unionist. Constitutional Union gain.	▌ ✓ Alexander H. Stephens (Constitutional Union) 70.82%; ▌David W. Lewis (Southern Rights) 29.18%
Georgia 8	Robert Toombs	Whig	1844	Incumbent re-elected as a Unionist. Constitutional Union gain.	▌ ✓ Robert Toombs (Constitutional Union)

== Illinois ==
Elections were held November 5, 1850.

District	Incumbent			This race	
District	Member	Party	First elected	Results	Candidates
Illinois 1	William H. Bissell	Democratic	1848	Incumbent re-elected.	▌ ✓ William H. Bissell (Democratic)
Illinois 2	John A. McClernand	Democratic	1842	Incumbent retired. Democratic hold.	▌ ✓ Willis Allen (Democratic) 55.5%; ▌Thomas G. C. Davis (Whig) 45.5%
Illinois 3	Timothy R. Young	Democratic	1848	Incumbent retired. Democratic hold.	▌ ✓ Orlando B. Ficklin (Democratic) 56.3%; ▌E. G. Ryan (Whig) 43.5%
Illinois 4	John Wentworth	Democratic	1842	Incumbent retired. Democratic hold.	▌ ✓ Richard S. Molony (Democratic) 48.9%; ▌Churchill Coffing (Whig) 46.1%
Illinois 5	William Alexander Richardson	Democratic	1847	Incumbent re-elected.	▌ ✓ William Alexander Richardson (Democratic) 53.0%; ▌ Orville H. Browning (Whig) 47.1%
Illinois 6	Edward D. Baker	Whig	1848	Incumbent retired. Democratic gain.	▌ ✓ Thompson Campbell (Democratic) 50.7%; ▌ Martin P. Sweet (Whig) 48.7%
Illinois 7	Thomas L. Harris	Democratic	1848	Incumbent lost re-election. Whig gain.	▌ ✓ Richard Yates Sr. (Whig) 52.8%; ▌Thomas L. Harris (Democratic) 47.1%

== Indiana ==
Elections were held August 4, 1851, after the March 4, 1851 beginning of the term, but before the House first convened in December 1851.

District	Incumbent			This race	
District	Member	Party	First elected	Results	Candidates
Indiana 1	Nathaniel Albertson	Democratic	1849	Incumbent Lost renomination. Democratic hold.	▌ ✓ James Lockhart (Democratic) 51.0%; ▌Lemuel Debruler (Whig) 49.0%
Indiana 2	Cyrus L. Dunham	Democratic	1849	Incumbent re-elected.	▌ ✓ Cyrus L. Dunham (Democratic) 53.2%; ▌Roger Martin (Whig) 46.8%
Indiana 3	John L. Robinson	Democratic	1847	Incumbent re-elected.	▌ ✓ John L. Robinson (Democratic) 50.2%; ▌Johnson Watts (Whig) 49.8%
Indiana 4	George W. Julian	Free Soil	1849	Incumbent lost re-election. Whig gain.	▌ ✓ Samuel W. Parker (Whig) 52.9%; ▌George W. Julian (Free Soil) 47.1%
Indiana 5	John L. Robinson	Democratic	1849	Incumbent Lost renomination. Democratic hold.	▌ ✓ Thomas A. Hendricks (Democratic) 62.1%; ▌William P. Rush (Whig) 38.0%
Indiana 6	Willis A. Gorman	Democratic	1849	Incumbent re-elected.	▌ ✓ Willis A. Gorman (Democratic) 66.9%; ▌Eli P. Farmer (Whig) 33.1%
Indiana 7	Edward W. McGaughey	Whig	1849	Incumbent lost re-election. Democratic gain.	▌ ✓ John G. Davis (Democratic) 51.1%; ▌Edward W. McGaughey (Whig) 48.9%
Indiana 8	Joseph E. McDonald	Democratic	1849	Incumbent retired. Democratic hold.	▌ ✓ Daniel Mace (Democratic) 50.8%; ▌David Brier (Whig) 49.0%
Indiana 9	Graham N. Fitch	Democratic	1849	Incumbent re-elected.	▌ ✓ Graham N. Fitch (Democratic) 50.6%; ▌Schuyler Colfax (Whig) 49.4%
Indiana 10	Andrew J. Harlan	Democratic	1849	Incumbent retired. Whig gain.	▌ ✓ Samuel Brenton (Whig/Free Soil) 50.9%; ▌James W. Borden (Democratic) 47.1%

== Iowa ==
Elections were held August 5, 1850.

District	Incumbent			This race	
District	Member	Party	First elected	Results	Candidates
Iowa 1	Daniel F. Miller	Whig	1850	Incumbent retired. Democratic gain.	▌ ✓ Bernhart Henn (Democratic) 50.5%; ▌George G. Wright (Whig) 47.4%
Iowa 2	Shepherd Leffler	Democratic	1846	Incumbent retired. Democratic hold.	▌ ✓ Lincoln Clark (Democratic) 54.0%; ▌William H. Henderson (Whig) 44.4%

== Kentucky ==
Elections were held August 4, 1851, after the March 4, 1851 beginning of the term, but before the House first convened in December 1851.

District	Incumbent			This race	
District	Member	Party	First elected	Results	Candidates
Kentucky 1	Linn Boyd	Democratic	1839	Incumbent re-elected.	▌ ✓ Linn Boyd (Democratic) 57.5%; ▌H. M. McCarty (Whig) 29.9%; ▌ Hiram McElroy (Unknown) 12.7%
Kentucky 2	James Leeper Johnson	Whig	1849	Incumbent renominated but declined. Whig hold.	▌ ✓ Benjamin E. Grey (Whig) 63.5%; ▌ Jeff Jennings (Unknown) 36.5%
Kentucky 3	Finis McLean	Whig	1849	Incumbent retired. Whig hold.	▌ ✓ Presley Ewing (Whig) 52.1%; ▌ Beverly L. Clarke (Democratic) 47.9%
Kentucky 4	George Caldwell	Democratic	1849	Incumbent retired. Whig gain.	▌ ✓ William Thomas Ward (Whig)
Kentucky 5	John Burton Thompson	Whig	1847	Incumbent retired. Democratic gain.	▌ ✓ James W. Stone (Democratic) 51.6%; ▌ C. S. Hill (Unknown) 48.4%
Kentucky 6	Daniel Breck	Whig	1849	Incumbent retired. Whig hold.	▌ ✓ Addison White (Whig) 56.6%; ▌ Theodore T. Garrard (Unknown) 40.0%
Kentucky 7	Humphrey Marshall	Whig	1849	Incumbent re-elected.	▌ ✓ Humphrey Marshall (Whig) 50.5%; ▌ David Meriwether (Democratic) 49.5%
Kentucky 8	Charles S. Morehead	Whig	1847	Incumbent retired. Democratic gain.	▌ ✓ John C. Breckinridge (Democratic) 52.5%; ▌ Leslie Combs (Whig) 47.6%
Kentucky 9	John C. Mason	Democratic	1849	Incumbent re-elected.	▌ ✓ John C. Mason (Democratic) 72.1%; ▌ Samuel Montgomery (Whig) 27.2%
Kentucky 10	Richard H. Stanton	Democratic	1849	Incumbent re-elected.	▌ ✓ Richard H. Stanton (Democratic) 53.6%; ▌ William C. Marshall (Whig) 46.4%

== Louisiana ==
Elections were held November 4, 1851, after the March 4, 1851 beginning of the term, but before the House first convened in December 1851.

District	Incumbent			This race	
District	Member	Party	First elected	Results	Candidates
Louisiana 1
Louisiana 2
Louisiana 3
Louisiana 4

== Maine ==
Elections were held September 9, 1850.

District	Incumbent			This race	
District	Member	Party	First elected	Results	Candidates
Maine 1
Maine 2
Maine 3
Maine 4
Maine 5
Maine 6
Maine 7

== Maryland ==
Elections were held October 1, 1851 elections were after the March 4, 1851 beginning of the new term, but still before the Congress convened in December 1851.

District	Incumbent			This race	
District	Member	Party	First elected	Results	Candidates
Maryland 1
Maryland 2
Maryland 3
Maryland 4
Maryland 5
Maryland 6

== Massachusetts ==
Elections were held November 11, 1850, but at least one district's elections went to multiple ballots into 1851.

District	Incumbent			This race	
District	Member	Party	First elected	Results	Candidates
Massachusetts 1
Massachusetts 2
Massachusetts 3
Massachusetts 4	Vacant due to failure to elect.			Whig gain.	First ballot (November 11, 1850): ▌Benjamin Thompson (Whig) 39.60%; ▌John G. Palfrey (Free Soil) 34.25%; ▌Richard Frothingham (Democratic) 26.16%; Second ballot (January 20, 1851): ▌Benjamin Thompson (Whig) 42.76%; ▌John G. Palfrey (Free Soil) 33.86%; ▌Richard Frothingham (Democratic) 23.39%; Third ballot (April 7, 1851): ▌Benjamin Thompson (Whig) 42.12%; ▌John G. Palfrey (Free Soil) 40.18%; ▌Richard Frothingham (Democratic) 17.70%; Fourth ballot (May 26, 1851): ▌ ✓ Benjamin Thompson (Whig) 47.65%; ▌John G. Palfrey (Free Soil) 47.00%; ▌Richard Frothingham (Democratic) 5.36%
Massachusetts 5
Massachusetts 6
Massachusetts 7	Julius Rockwell	Whig	1844 (late)	Incumbent lost re-election. Whig hold.	First ballot (November 11, 1850): ▌Henry W. Bishop (Democratic) 45.75%; ▌John Z. Goodrich (Whig) 45.30%; ▌Joel Hayden (Free Soil) 6.72%; ▌Julius Rockwell (Whig) 2.23%; Second ballot (January 20, 1851): ▌John Z. Goodrich (Whig) 48.32%; ▌Henry W. Bishop (Democratic) 42.61%; ▌Joel Hayden (Free Soil) 7.73%; ▌Julius Rockwell (Whig) 1.34%; Third ballot (April 7, 1851): ▌John Z. Goodrich (Whig) 48.24%; ▌Henry W. Bishop (Democratic) 43.02%; ▌Joel Hayden (Free Soil) 7.96%; Fourth ballot (May 26, 1851): ▌ ✓ John Z. Goodrich (Whig) 52.80%; ▌Henry W. Bishop (Democratic) 46.32%
Massachusetts 8
Massachusetts 9
Massachusetts 10

== Michigan ==
Elections were held November 5, 1850.

District	Incumbent			This race	
District	Member	Party	First elected	Results	Candidates
Michigan 1	Alexander W. Buel	Democratic	1848	Incumbent lost re-election. Whig gain.	▌ ✓ Ebenezer J. Penniman (Whig) 54.7%; ▌Alexander W. Buel (Democratic) 45.3%
Michigan 2	William Sprague	Whig	1848	Incumbent retired. Democratic gain.	▌ ✓ Charles E. Stuart (Democratic) 50.8%; ▌Joseph R. Williams (Whig) 49.0%
Michigan 3	Kinsley S. Bingham	Democratic	1846	Incumbent retired. Whig gain.	▌ ✓ James L. Conger (Whig) 50.6%; ▌Charles C. Hascall (Democratic) 49.4%

== Minnesota Territory ==
See Non-voting delegates, below.

== Mississippi ==
Elections were held November 3–4, 1851, after the March 4, 1851 beginning of the term, but before the House first convened in December 1851.

District	Incumbent			This race	
District	Member	Party	First elected	Results	Candidates
Mississippi 1	Jacob Thompson	Democratic	1839	Incumbent lost re-election as a Southern Rights candidate. Union gain.	▌ ✓ Benjamin D. Nabers (Union) 57.80%; ▌Jacob Thompson (Southern Rights) 42.20%
Mississippi 2	Winfield S. Featherston	Democratic	1847	Incumbent lost re-election as a Southern Rights candidate. Union gain.	▌ ✓ John A. Wilcox (Union) 52.77%; ▌Winfield S. Featherston (Southern Rights) 47.24%
Mississippi 3	William McWillie	Democratic	1849	Incumbent lost re-election as a Southern Rights candidate. Union gain.	▌ ✓ John D. Freeman (Union) 50.81%; ▌William McWillie (Southern Rights) 49.19%
Mississippi 4	Albert G. Brown	Democratic	1847	Incumbent re-elected as a Southern Rights candidate. Southern Rights gain.	▌ ✓ Albert G. Brown (Southern Rights) 57.35%; ▌A. B. Dawson (Union) 42.66%

== Missouri ==
Elections were held August 5, 1850.

District	Incumbent			This race	
District	Member	Party	First elected	Results	Candidates
Missouri 1
Missouri 2
Missouri 3
Missouri 4
Missouri 5

== New Hampshire ==
Elections were held March 11, 1851, after the March 4, 1851 beginning of the term, but before the House first convened in December 1851.

District	Incumbent			This race	
District	Member	Party	First elected	Results	Candidates
New Hampshire 1	Amos Tuck	Free Soil	1847	Incumbent won re-election as a Whig. Whig gain.	▌ ✓ Amos Tuck (Whig) 51.23%; ▌George W. Kittredge (Democratic) 48.77%
New Hampshire 2	Charles H. Peaslee	Democratic	1847	Incumbent re-elected.	▌ ✓ Charles H. Peaslee (Democratic) 55.01%; ▌ Anthony Colby (Whig) 29.18%; ▌ Asa Fowler (Free Soil) 15.81%
New Hampshire 3	George W. Morrison	Democratic	1850 (special)	Incumbent lost re-election. Whig gain.	▌ ✓ Jared Perkins (Whig) 52.84%; ▌ George W. Morrison (Democratic) 47.16%
New Hampshire 4	Harry Hibbard	Democratic	1849	Incumbent re-elected.	▌ ✓ Harry Hibbard (Democratic) 59.66%; ▌Jonathan Kitteridge (Whig) 27.32%; ▌ John H. White (Free Soil) 13.02%

== New Jersey ==
Elections were held November 5, 1850.

District	Incumbent			This race	
District	Member	Party	First elected	Results	Candidates
New Jersey 1
New Jersey 2
New Jersey 3
New Jersey 4
New Jersey 5

== New Mexico Territory ==
See Non-voting delegates, below.

== New York ==
Elections were held November 5, 1850.

District	Incumbent			This race	
District	Member	Party	First elected	Results	Candidates
New York 1
New York 2
New York 3
New York 4
New York 5
New York 6
New York 7
New York 8
New York 9
New York 10
New York 11
New York 12
New York 13
New York 14
New York 15
New York 16
New York 17
New York 18
New York 19
New York 20
New York 21
New York 22
New York 23
New York 24
New York 25
New York 26
New York 27
New York 28
New York 29
New York 30
New York 31
New York 32
New York 33
New York 34

== North Carolina ==
Elections were held August 7, 1851, after the March 4, 1851 beginning of the term, but before the House first convened in December 1851.

District	Incumbent			This race	
District	Member	Party	First elected	Results	Candidates
North Carolina 1
North Carolina 2
North Carolina 3
North Carolina 4
North Carolina 5
North Carolina 6
North Carolina 7
North Carolina 8
North Carolina 9

== Ohio ==
Elections were held October 8, 1850.

District	Incumbent			This race	
District	Member	Party	First elected	Results	Candidates
Ohio 1
Ohio 2
Ohio 3
Ohio 4
Ohio 5
Ohio 6
Ohio 7
Ohio 8
Ohio 9
Ohio 10
Ohio 11
Ohio 12
Ohio 13
Ohio 14
Ohio 15
Ohio 16
Ohio 17
Ohio 18
Ohio 19
Ohio 20
Ohio 21

== Oregon Territory ==
See Non-voting delegates, below.

== Pennsylvania ==
Elections were held October 8, 1850.

District	Incumbent			This race	
District	Member	Party	First elected	Results	Candidates
Pennsylvania 1
Pennsylvania 2
Pennsylvania 3
Pennsylvania 4
Pennsylvania 5
Pennsylvania 6
Pennsylvania 7
Pennsylvania 8
Pennsylvania 9
Pennsylvania 10
Pennsylvania 11
Pennsylvania 12
Pennsylvania 13
Pennsylvania 14
Pennsylvania 15
Pennsylvania 16
Pennsylvania 17
Pennsylvania 18
Pennsylvania 19
Pennsylvania 20
Pennsylvania 21
Pennsylvania 22
Pennsylvania 23
Pennsylvania 24

== Rhode Island ==
Elections were held April 2, 1851, after the March 4, 1851 beginning of the term, but before the House first convened in December 1851.

District	Incumbent			This race	
District	Member	Party	First elected	Results	Candidates
Rhode Island 1
Rhode Island 2

== South Carolina ==
Elections were held October 14–15, 1850.

District	Incumbent			This race	
District	Member	Party	First elected	Results	Candidates
South Carolina 1
South Carolina 2
South Carolina 3
South Carolina 4
South Carolina 5
South Carolina 6
South Carolina 7

== Tennessee ==
Elections were held August 7, 1851, after the March 4, 1851 beginning of the term, but before the House first convened in December 1851.

District	Incumbent			This race	
District	Member	Party	First elected	Results	Candidates
Tennessee 1	Andrew Johnson	Democratic	1842	Incumbent re-elected.	▌ ✓ Andrew Johnson (Democratic) 57.52%; ▌Landon Carter Haynes (Democratic) 42.48%
Tennessee 2	Albert G. Watkins	Whig	1849	Incumbent re-elected.	✓ Albert G. Watkins (Whig) 78.65%; ▌[FNU] Hurley (Democratic) 17.57%; ▌J. D. Dickinson (Whig) 3.78%
Tennessee 3	Josiah M. Anderson	Whig	1849	Incumbent lost re-election. Democratic gain.	▌ ✓ William M. Churchwell (Democratic) 50.06%; ▌Josiah M. Anderson (Whig) 49.94%
Tennessee 4	John H. Savage	Democratic	1849	Incumbent re-elected.	▌ ✓ John H. Savage (Democratic) 57.20%; ▌Jefferson D. Goodpasture (Whig) 42.80%
Tennessee 5	George W. Jones	Democratic	1842	Incumbent re-elected.	▌ ✓ George W. Jones (Democratic) 100%
Tennessee 6	James H. Thomas	Democratic	1847	Incumbent lost re-election. Independent Democratic gain.	▌ ✓ William H. Polk (Independent Democratic) 56.13%; ▌James H. Thomas (Democratic) 43.87%
Tennessee 7	Meredith P. Gentry	Whig	1845	Incumbent re-elected.	▌ ✓ Meredith P. Gentry (Whig) 100%
Tennessee 8	Andrew Ewing	Democratic	1849	Incumbent retired. Whig gain.	▌ ✓ William Cullom (Whig) 55.63%; ▌J. J. Southall (Democratic) 44.37%
Tennessee 9	Isham G. Harris	Democratic	1849	Incumbent re-elected.	▌ ✓ Isham G. Harris (Democratic) 59.47%; ▌I. G. Hornberger (Whig) 40.53%
Tennessee 10	Frederick P. Stanton	Democratic	1845	Incumbent re-elected.	▌ ✓ Frederick P. Stanton (Democratic) 51.81%; ▌Walter S. Coleman (Whig) 48.19%
Tennessee 11	Christopher H. Williams	Whig	1849	Incumbent re-elected.	▌ ✓ Christopher H. Williams (Whig) 100%

== Texas ==
Elections were held August 4, 1851, after the March 4, 1851 beginning of the term, but before the House first convened in December 1851.

District	Incumbent			This race	
District	Member	Party	First elected	Results	Candidates
Texas 1
Texas 2

== Utah Territory ==
See Non-voting delegates, below.

== Vermont ==
Elections were held September 3, 1850.

District	Incumbent			This race	
District	Member	Party	First elected	Results	Candidates
Vermont 1	William Henry	Whig	1846	Incumbent retired. Whig hold.	First ballot: ▌A. P. Lyman (Whig) 31.4%; ▌Ahiman Louis Miner (Whig) 30.5%; ▌Daniel Roberts Jr. (Free Soil) 27.2%; ▌Merritt Clark (Democratic) 10.3%; Second ballot: ▌ ✓ Ahiman Louis Miner (Whig) 39.2%; ▌A. P. Lyman (Whig) 37.2%; ▌Daniel Roberts Jr. (Free Soil) 23.6%
Vermont 2	William Hebard	Whig	1848	Incumbent re-elected.	▌ ✓ William Hebard (Whig) 55.2%; ▌Jefferson P. Kidder (Free Soil) 42.8%; ▌J. F. Redfield (Unknown) 0.8%; ▌Daniel Cobb (Unknown) 0.2%
Vermont 3	James Meacham	Whig	1849 (special)	Incumbent re-elected.	▌ ✓ James Meacham (Whig) 55.4%; ▌Herman R. Beardsley (Free Soil) 30.1%; ▌Giles Harrington (Democratic) 14.4%
Vermont 4	Lucius B. Peck	Democratic	1846	Incumbent retired. Free Soil gain.	▌ ✓ Thomas Bartlett Jr. (Free Soil) 52.8%; ▌Bliss N. Davis (Whig) 35.9%

== Virginia ==
Elections were held October 23, 1851, after the March 4, 1851 beginning of the term, but before the House first convened in December 1851.

District	Incumbent			This race	
District	Member	Party	First elected	Results	Candidates
Virginia 1	John Millson	Democratic	1849	Incumbent re-elected.	▌ ✓ John Millson (Democratic) 59.6%; ▌Leopold P. C. Cowper (Whig) 40.4%
Virginia 2	Richard Kidder Meade	Democratic	1847 (special)	Incumbent re-elected.	▌ ✓ Richard Kidder Meade (Democratic) 100%
Virginia 3	Thomas H. Averett	Democratic	1849	Incumbent re-elected.	▌ ✓ Thomas H. Averett (Democratic) 57.4%; ▌Thomas Flournoy (Whig) 42.6%
Virginia 4	Thomas S. Bocock	Democratic	1847	Incumbent re-elected.	▌ ✓ Thomas S. Bocock (Democratic) 63.5%; ▌Philip A. Bolling (Whig) 36.5%
Virginia 5	Paulus Powell	Democratic	1849	Incumbent re-elected.	▌ ✓ Paulus Powell (Democratic) 51.5%; ▌William L. Goggin (Whig) 48.5%
Virginia 6	James Seddon	Democratic	1845; 1847 (retired); 1849	Incumbent retired. Democratic hold.	▌ ✓ John Caskie (Democratic) 54.5%; ▌John Botts (Whig) 45.5%
Virginia 7	Thomas H. Bayly	Democratic	1844 (special)	Incumbent re-elected.	▌ ✓ Thomas H. Bayly (Democratic) 100%
Virginia 8	Alexander Holladay	Democratic	1849	Incumbent re-elected.	▌ ✓ Alexander Holladay (Democratic) 61.3%; ▌Robert W. Carter (Whig) 38.7%
Virginia 9	Jeremiah Morton	Ind. Whig	1849	Incumbent lost re-election as a Democrat. Whig gain.	▌ ✓ James F. Strother (Whig) 55.9%; ▌Jeremiah Morton (Democratic) 44.1%
Virginia 10	Richard Parker	Democratic	1849	Incumbent retired. Whig gain.	▌ ✓ Charles J. Faulkner (Whig) 53.7%; ▌Henry Bedinger (Democratic) 46.3%
Virginia 11	James McDowell	Democratic	1846 (special)	Incumbent retired. Democratic hold.	▌ ✓ John Letcher (Democratic) 100%
Virginia 12	Henry A. Edmundson	Democratic	1849	Incumbent re-elected.	▌ ✓ Henry A. Edmundson (Democratic) 100%
Virginia 13	Fayette McMullen	Democratic	1849	Incumbent re-elected.	▌ ✓ Fayette McMullen (Democratic) 100%
Virginia 14	James M. H. Beale	Democratic	1849	Incumbent re-elected.	▌ ✓ James M. H. Beale (Democratic) 58.8%; ▌[FNU] Smith (Whig) 41.2%
Virginia 15	Thomas Haymond	Whig	1849 (special)	Incumbent lost re-election. Democratic gain.	▌ ✓ George W. Thompson (Democratic) 52.5%; ▌Thomas Haymond (Whig) 47.5%

== Wisconsin ==
Elections were held November 5, 1850.

District	Incumbent			This race	
District	Member	Party	First elected	Results	Candidates
Wisconsin 1	Charles Durkee	Free Soil	1848	Incumbent re-elected.	▌ ✓ Charles Durkee (Free Soil) 57.4%; ▌Andrew E. Elmore (Democratic) 42.6%
Wisconsin 2	Orsamus Cole	Whig	1848	Incumbent lost re-election. Democratic gain.	▌ ✓ Ben C. Eastman (Democratic) 55.8%; ▌Orsamus Cole (Whig) 44.2%
Wisconsin 3	James Duane Doty	Democratic	1848	Incumbent won re-election as an independent. Independent Democratic gain.	▌ ✓ James Duane Doty (Ind. Democratic) 67.5%; ▌Harrison Carroll Hobart (Democratic) 32.5%

== Non-voting delegates ==
District	Incumbent			This race	
District	Delegate	Party	First elected	Results	Candidates
Minnesota Territory	Henry Hastings Sibley	Democratic	1848 (Wis. Territory: special); 1849 (Wis. Territory: eliminated); 1849 (Minn. Territory)	Incumbent re-elected.	▌ ✓ Henry Hastings Sibley (Democratic); [data missing]
New Mexico Territory	New seat			New seat. Democratic gain.	▌ ✓ Richard H. Weightman (Democratic) 4,200 votes; ▌A. W. Reynolds (Whig) 3,458 votes
Oregon Territory	Samuel Thurston	Democratic	1849 (new seat)	Incumbent died April 9, 1851. New delegate elected June 2, 1851. Democratic hold.	▌ ✓ Joseph Lane (Democratic); [data missing]
Utah Territory	New seat			New seat. Independent gain.	▌ ✓ John M. Bernhisel (Independent); [data missing]

== See also ==
- 1850 United States elections
  - List of United States House of Representatives elections (1824–1854)
  - 1850–51 United States Senate elections
- 31st United States Congress
- 32nd United States Congress

== Bibliography ==
- Dubin, Michael J. (March 1, 1998). United States Congressional Elections, 1788-1997: The Official Results of the Elections of the 1st Through 105th Congresses. McFarland and Company. ISBN 978-0786402830.
- Martis, Kenneth C. (January 1, 1989). The Historical Atlas of Political Parties in the United States Congress, 1789-1989. Macmillan Publishing Company. ISBN 978-0029201701.
- Moore, John L., ed. (1994). Congressional Quarterly's Guide to U.S. Elections (Third ed.). Congressional Quarterly Inc. ISBN 978-0871879967.
- "Party Divisions of the House of Representatives* 1789–Present". Office of the Historian, House of United States House of Representatives.
