= Trafton =

Trafton may refer to the following:

== People ==
- Mark Trafton (1801–1901), American minister and U.S. Congressman
- Adeline Trafton (1842–1920), American author
- George Trafton (1896–1971), American football player
- Stephanie Brown Trafton (born 1979), American track and field athlete

== Places ==
- Trafton, Washington
- Trafton School, on the U.S. National Register of Historic Places

== Other uses ==
- Trafton script, designed by Howard Allen Trafton for Bauer Type Foundry
