= Littlepage =

Littlepage is an English surname. Notable people with the surname include:

- Adam Brown Littlepage (1859–1921), American lawyer and politician
- Craig Littlepage (born 1951), American college athletics administrator and former basketball player and coach
- Jack Littlepage (1894 –1948), American mining engineer who worked in the Soviet Union
- Louis Littlepage (1762–1802), American diplomat
