= Alexander Q. Holladay =

American college president and politician (1839–1909)

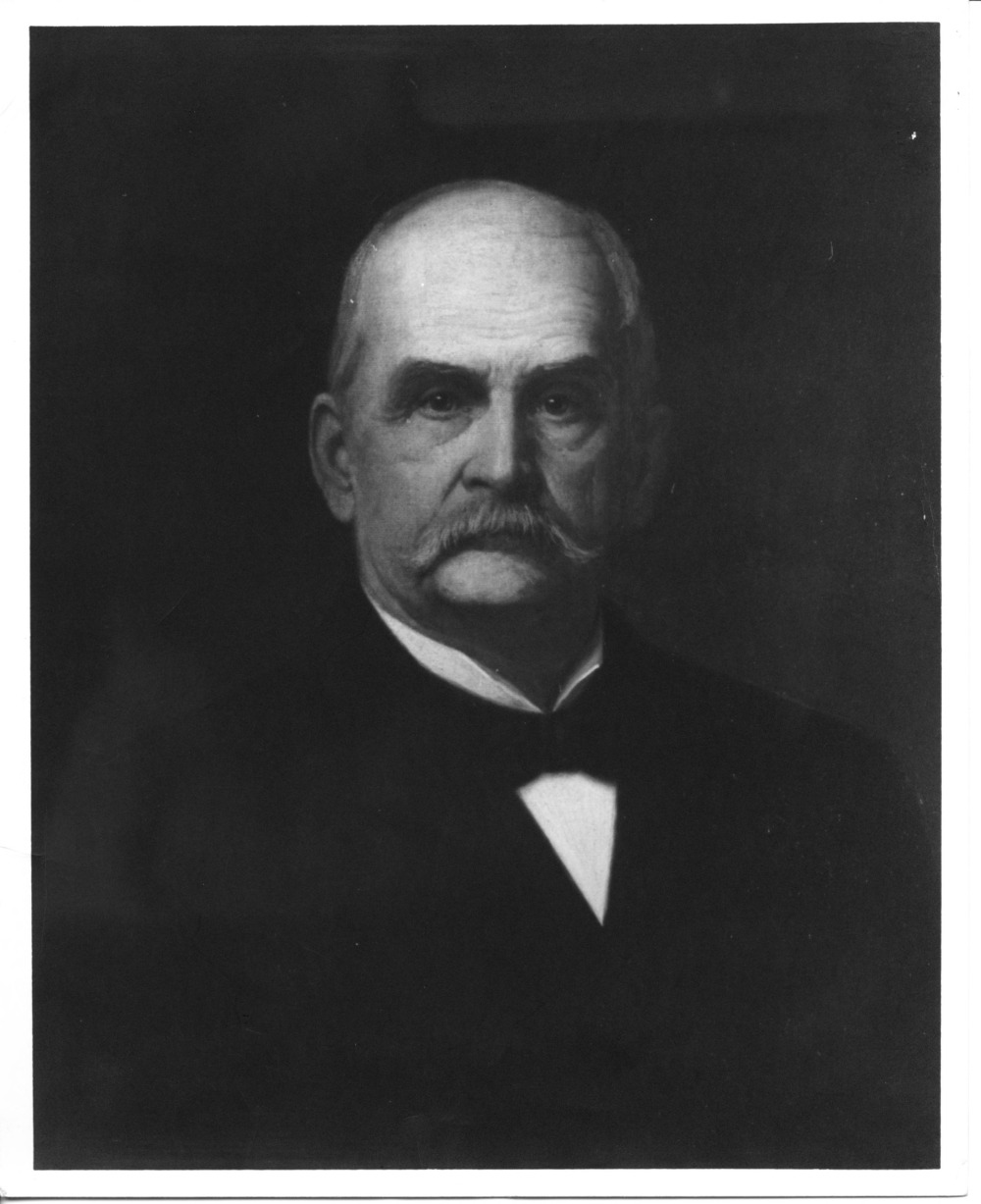
- Alexander Quarles Holladay

Member of the Virginia State Senate
- In office 1871–1875

President of the Florida State Agricultural College
- In office 1885–1888

Personal details
- Born: May 8, 1839 Cherry Grove, Virginia, US
- Died: March 13, 1909 (aged 69)
- Parent: Alexander Richmond Holladay (father)
- Education: University of Virginia; University of Berlin
- Occupation: lawyer

Military service
- Branch/service: Confederate States Army
- Rank: colonel

Alexander Quarles Holladay LL.D. (May 8, 1839 – March 13, 1909) was an American lawyer, state senator and college administrator.

During the Civil War, Holladay was an officer of the Confederate States Army, rising to the rank of colonel. For the remainder of his life he was commonly called "Colonel Holladay".

== Life ==
The son of Alexander Richmond Holladay, a lawyer and former U. S. Representative, and Patsy Quarles Poindexter, Holladay was born in Cherry Grove, Virginia. He was educated, like his father, at the University of Virginia (1857–1859) and then at the University of Berlin (1859–1861) where he specialized in Latin, Greek, moral philosophy, and law. While at Charlottesville, he was a member of the Beta Theta Pi fraternity. On April 17, 1861, a few days after the outbreak of the Civil War, Holladay married Virginia Randolph Bolling, a daughter of Thomas Bolling of Bolling Island, in the upper James River in Goochland County, Virginia. On May 25, 1861, he was commissioned into the Confederate States Army. The Holladays' daughter Mary Stuart Holladay was born on February 3, 1862, their son William Waller Holladay on September 7, 1864, and their daughter Julia Cabell Holladay in 1868. They had two further sons, Alexander Randolph Holladay (March 12, 1870), and Charles Bolling Holladay, (February 12, 1873).

During the four years of the Civil War, Holladay rose from Second Lieutenant to Colonel. After the war ended in 1865, he studied law and went on to practice in partnership with his father between 1870 and 1877 (Holladay, White and Holladay). During that period, he served in the Virginia State Senate as senator for Richmond, from 1871 to 1875. He taught in Richmond for a while before becoming president of the Stonewall Jackson Institute in Abingdon, Virginia. From 1885 to 1888, he was president of the Florida State Agricultural College in Lake City, Florida.

In the year 1888–89, F. L. Kern served as President of the college, while Holladay remained, his name appearing thus: "Col. A. Q. Holladay (of the Universities of Virginia and Berlin), Professor of History, English Literature, and Latin."

In 1889, the North Carolina College of Agriculture and Mechanical Arts Board of Trustees appointed Holladay the first chief executive of the college, which later developed into the North Carolina State University. Holladay originally applied for the position of professor of English of the new college. Holladay presided over approximately fifty students during the 1889–1890 academic year.

After his retirement in 1899, Holladay spent time in Delaware, New York, and Virginia until failing health brought him back to his daughter's home in Raleigh, North Carolina, where he lived until he died and was buried at Raleigh in 1909. NCSU Libraries Special Collections Research Center serves as the repository for Alexander Holladay's manuscript collection.

== Memorial ==
The Alexander Quarles Holladay Medal is awarded by the North Carolina State University as the highest honor it can bestow on members of its faculty. The first building built at North Carolina State University, Holladay Hall, was renamed after him in 1915.

== Publications ==
- Alexander Quarles Holladay, Some Genealogical Notes for the information of younger descendants (1901)
- Alexander Quarles Holladay, Social Conditions in Colonial North Carolina (E. M. Uzzell & Co., 1904)
