= David Kilgore =

American politician (1804–1879)

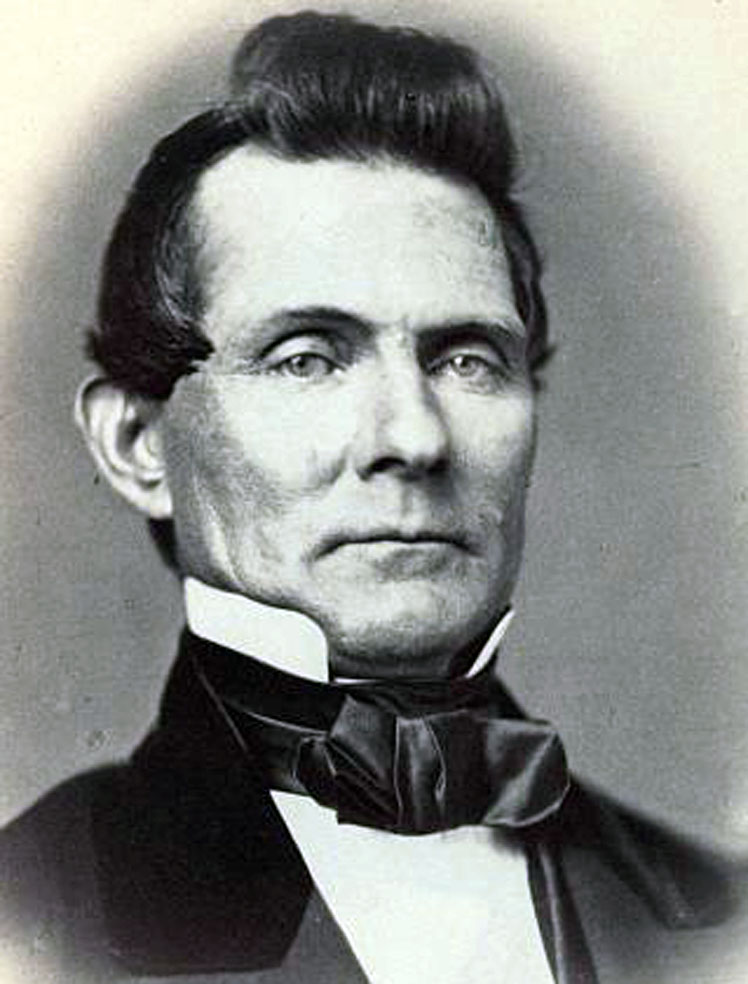

Member of the U.S. House of Representatives from Indiana's 5th district
- In office March 4, 1857 – March 3, 1861
- Preceded by: David P. Holloway
- Succeeded by: George W. Julian

Personal details
- Born: April 3, 1804 Harrison County, Kentucky, U.S.
- Died: January 22, 1879 (aged 74) Yorktown, Indiana, U.S
- Party: Republican

David Kilgore (April 3, 1804 – January 22, 1879) was an American lawyer, jurist, and politician who served two terms as a U.S. representative from Indiana from 1857 to 1861.

== Early life and career ==
Born in Harrison County, Kentucky, Kilgore moved with his father to Franklin County, Indiana, in 1819. As a child, he attended common schools and went on to study law. He was admitted to the bar in 1830 and commenced practice in Yorktown, Indiana.

== Political career ==
Kilgore served as member of the State House of Representatives in 1833–1836, 1838, 1839, and 1855, and served as speaker in 1855. He served as president judge of the Yorktown circuit 1839–1846. He served as delegate to the State constitutional convention in 1850. Kilgore was also one of the pall bearers for Abraham Lincoln's funeral procession in Indianapolis.

=== Congress ===
Kilgore was elected as a Republican to the Thirty-fifth and Thirty-sixth Congresses (March 4, 1857 – March 3, 1861).

=== Later political activity ===
He served as delegate to the Union National Convention which met in Philadelphia August 14, 1866.

== Death ==
He died near Yorktown, Indiana on January 22, 1879, and interred in Mount Pleasant Cemetery there. David Kilgore was a great-grandfather of Bernard (Barney) Kilgore, editor and publisher of The Wall Street Journal.

U.S. House of Representatives
| Preceded by David P. Holloway | Member of the U.S. House of Representatives from Indiana's 5th congressional district 1857–1861 | Succeeded by George W. Julian |
