= David P. Holloway =

American politician (1809–1883)

David Holloway
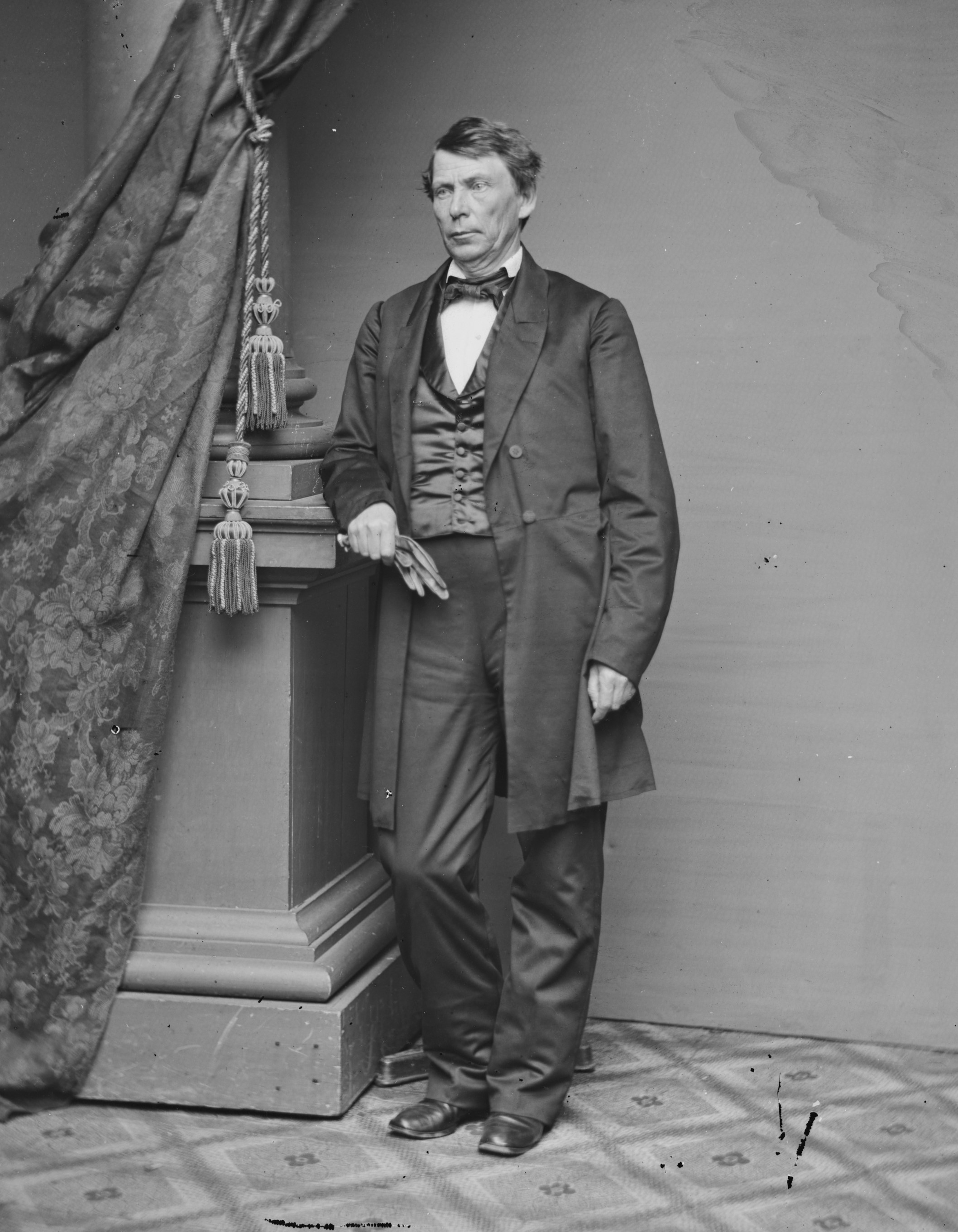
- Portrait of Holloway by Mathew Brady

Member of the U.S. House of Representatives from Indiana's 5th district
- In office March 4, 1855 – March 3, 1857
- Preceded by: Samuel W. Parker
- Succeeded by: David Kilgore

Member of the Indiana Senate
- In office 1844–1850

Member of the Indiana House of Representatives from the 4th district
- In office 1843–1844

Personal details
- Born: December 7, 1809 Waynesville, Ohio, U.S.
- Died: September 9, 1883 (aged 73) Washington, D.C., U.S
- Party: People's Party

David Pierson Holloway (December 7, 1809 – September 9, 1883) was a U.S. representative from Indiana who served from 1855 to 1857.

== Early life and career ==
Born in Waynesville, Ohio, Holloway moved with his parents to Cincinnati in 1813. He attended the common schools. Learned the printing business and served four years in the office of the Cincinnati Gazette. He moved to Richmond, Indiana, in 1823. Purchased the Richmond Palladium in 1832 and was its editor and proprietor until he died.

== Political career ==
He served as member of the State House of Representatives in 1843 and 1844. He served in the State Senate 1844–1850. He was appointed in 1849 examiner of land offices.

=== Congress ===
Holloway was elected as an Indiana People's Party candidate to the Thirty-fourth Congress (March 4, 1855 – March 3, 1857). He served as chairman of the Committee on Agriculture (Thirty-fourth Congress).

== Later career and death ==
He was appointed commissioner of patents and served from 1861 to 1865. He engaged as a patent attorney in Washington, D.C., until his death, on September 9, 1883, and was interred in Maple Grove Cemetery, Richmond, Indiana. However, he was reinterred in Earlham Cemetery.

U.S. House of Representatives
Preceded by Samuel W. Parker	Member of the U.S. House of Representatives from Indiana's 5th congressional district 1855–1857	Succeeded by David Kilgore
