= Grace Julian Clarke =

American suffragist (1865–1938)

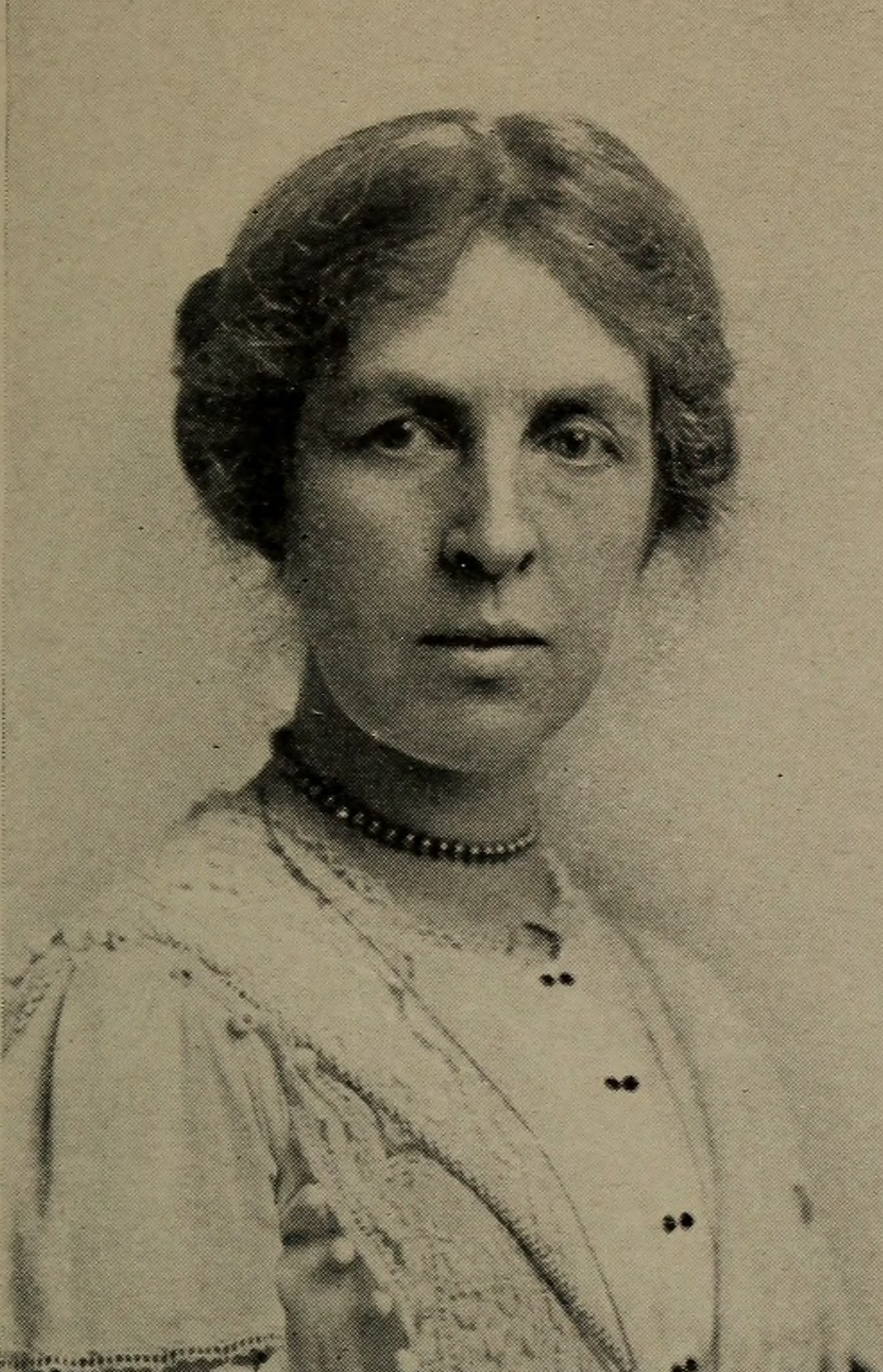
- Grace Julian Clarke, from a 1914 publication
- Born: Grace Giddings Julian; September 11, 1865; Centerville, Indiana, US
- Died: June 16, 1938 (aged 72); Indianapolis, Indiana, US
- Resting place: Crown Hill Cemetery and Arboretum, Section 27, Lot 196; 39.8173142°N 86.1701948°W
- Education: Butler University
- Occupation: Women's suffrage advocate
- Political party: Democrat
- Spouse: Charles B. Clarke
- Parent(s): George Washington Julian; Laura Giddings Julian
- Relatives: Joshua Reed Giddings (grandfather)

Grace Julian Clarke (September 1865 – June 18, 1938) was a clubwoman, women's suffrage activist, newspaper journalist, and author from Indiana. As the daughter of George Washington Julian and the granddaughter of Joshua Reed Giddings, both of whom were abolitionists and members of the U.S. Congress, Clarke's family exposed her to social reform issues at an early age. She is credited with reviving the women's suffrage movement in Indiana, where she was especially active in the national campaign for women's suffrage in the early twentieth century. She is best known for founding and leading the Indiana State Federation of Women's Clubs, the Legislative Council, and the Woman's Franchise League of Indiana (an affiliate of the National American Woman Suffrage Association and the predecessor to the League of Women Voters of Indiana). Clarke was the author of three books related to her father's life, and was a columnist for the Indianapolis Star from 1911 to 1929.

== Early life and education ==
Grace Giddings Julian was born on September 11, 1865, in Centerville, Wayne County, Indiana. She was the first of two children and the only daughter of George Washington Julian and his second wife, Laura Giddings Julian. Grace also had three older half-brothers. Her father, whose family came to Irvington, Indian,a from North Carolina, was an abolitionist, a U.S. congressman, and a social reformer who introduced the first federal suffrage amendment to the U.S. Constitution in 1868. Grace retained close ties to her father throughout her life. He died in 1899. Grace's mother was the daughter of Joshua Reed Giddings, an abolitionist and a U.S. congressman from Ohio.

Grace grew up in Washington, D.C., where her father served as a member of the U.S. House of Representatives until 1871. The family moved to Irvington, a suburban community east of downtown Indianapolis, in 1873. Grace resided in Irvington for the remainder of her life. She attended Mount Zion School and Butler University's preparatory school, which was located in Irvington at that time. Grace continued her education at Butler University, earning an undergraduate degree in 1884 and a master's degree in 1885. Grace was a member of a Unitarian congregation in Indianapolis.

== Marriage and family ==
Grace married Charles B. Clarke, an attorney, on September 11, 1887. Clarke, a Democrat, was a former U.S. deputy surveyor in the New Mexico Territory. He served in the Indiana Senate in 1913 and 1915. The couple had no children.

== Career ==
=== Women's suffrage advocate ===
Grace was an advocate in the women's suffrage movement, especially women's club activities, and active in several women's organizations in Indiana. She was most involved in founding and leading the Indiana State Federation of Women's Clubs, the Woman's Franchise League, and the Legislative Council. In 1892, Clarke formed the Irvington Women's Club, a local literary group, and served as its president. She was the president of the Indianapolis Woman's Club and the Catharine Merrill Club, and also a member of the Society of Indiana Pioneers and the Women's Press Club of Indiana.

Clarke was especially active in reviving the suffrage movement in Indiana, especially in gaining support among the state's women's clubs. In 1909, she

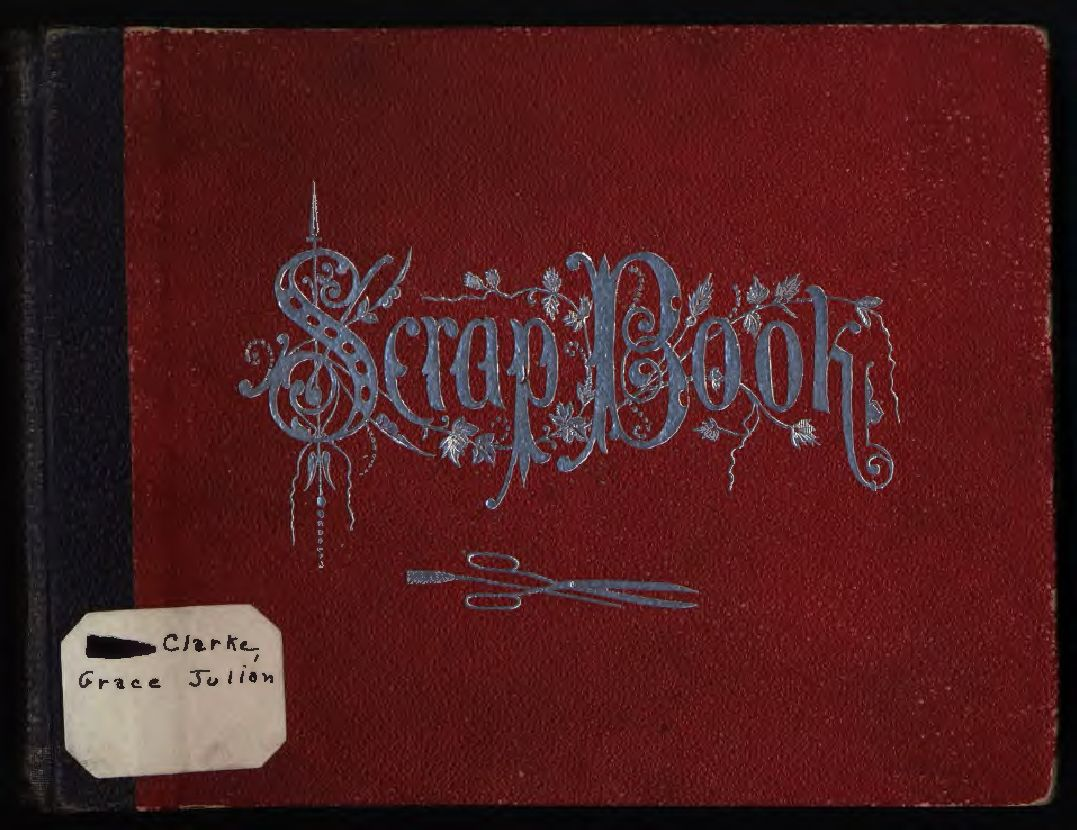
Clarke's scrapbook containing articles related to women's rights and suffrage, among other topics

organized the Seventh District of the Indiana Federation of Women's Clubs, and served as president of the Indiana Federation from 1909 to 1911. She was a director and national press chair of the General Federation of Women's Club from 1912 to 1916. One of her major contributions to the women's movement occurred in 1909, when she helped form a Women's School Commission organization that helped elect the first woman to the Indianapolis school board. Renamed the Woman's School League, Clarke served as its president and continued efforts to achieve suffrage for Indianapolis women. The organization, which had 60 branches and 3,000 members in Indiana, became the Woman's Franchise League of Indiana in 1911. It led the suffrage movement within the state. The Indiana group became an affiliate of the National American Woman Suffrage Association.

Clarke served as an officer in the Woman's Franchise League and became the first president of the Legislative Council of Indiana, a lobbying organization that she also helped found. Although the Indiana General Assembly defeated women's suffrage legislation in 1915, despite the council's lobbying efforts, it was successful in bringing various groups together to work toward a common goal. On January 20, 1920, Indiana became the twentieth state to ratify the national women's suffrage amendment (the Nineteenth Amendment to the U.S. Constitution). In May 1920, four months after the state legislature ratified the national suffrage amendment, the Woman's Franchise League members agreed to dissolve and form the League of Women Voters of Indiana. Clarke continued her involvement with the league, but also began pursuing her interests in the peace movement. In the aftermath of women gaining the vote, Clarke contributed a column for the Indianapolis Star representing the Democratic perspective and travelled the state speaking about the Democratic party and for its positions and candidates.

In her later years Clarke became a peace activist and was interested in international affairs and an ardent Democrat. She was a member of the national committee of the League to Enforce Peace and a member of the American Peace Society. In 1920 Clarke chaired Indiana's committee of Pro-League Independents. She also gave lectures in support of the League of Nations and received criticism for her public support of this unpopular idea.

Clarke's civic interests also included service on national and local boards. In 1916 Woodrow Wilson appointed Clarke, a political progressive, as head of the women's division of the Federal Employment Bureau in Indianapolis. In 1931 she was appointed to the Indianapolis City Planning Commission.

=== Author ===
In addition to her civic and political interests, Clarke was an author and newspaper journalist. From 1911 to 1929 she contributed a weekly column and a summary of women's club activities and political organizing to the Indianapolis Star, and edited its women's pages for a year. She continued to write for the paper after the passage of the 19th amendment and contributed a political column representing the Democratic Party. Clarke also contributed articles to the Indiana Magazine of History.

Clarke collected and published a book of her father's speeches, a volume of her own recollections of him, and wrote George W. Julian (1923), a biography of her father that became the first volume in the Indiana Historical Commission's Indiana biography series.

== Death and legacy ==
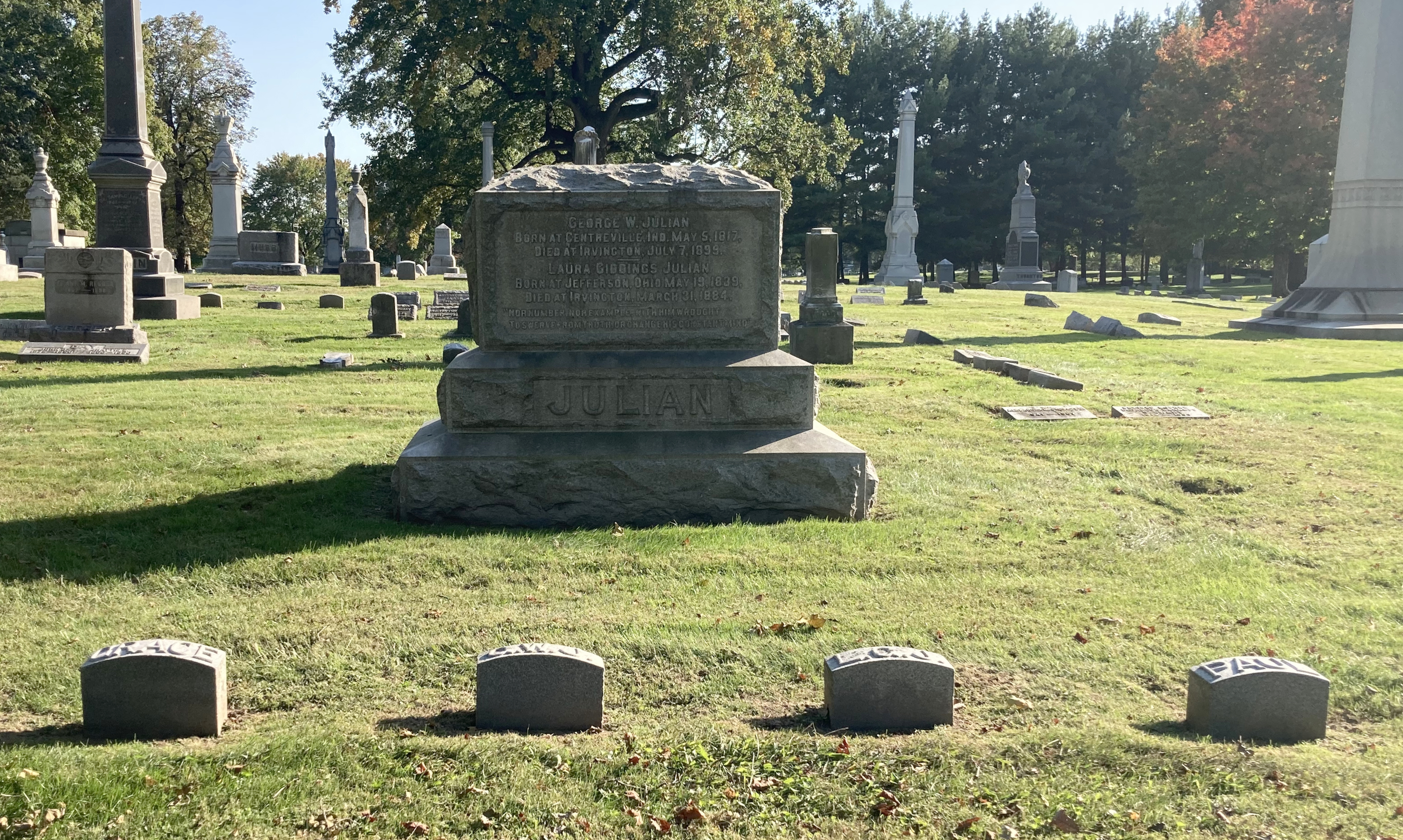
Clarke's grave at Crown Hill Cemetery

Clarke died at home in Irvington on June 18, 1938, of pneumonia. Her remains are interred at Crown Hill Cemetery in Indianapolis (Section 27, Lot 196).

In 2020, the Indiana Historical Bureau erected a marker at her home in Irvington.

== Published works ==
=== Books ===
- Later Speeches on Political Questions: With Select Controversial Papers (Indianapolis: Carlon and Hollenbeck, 1889)
- George W. Julian: Some Impressions (Indianapolis: C. E. Hollenbeck Press, 1902)
- George W. Julian (Indianapolis: Indiana Historical Commission, 1923)

=== Selected articles ===
- "Andrew Hoover Comes to Indiana", Indiana Magazine of History, XXXV (December 1928), 223–41
- "A Letter of Dr. Gamaliel Bailey to Joshua R. Giddings", Indiana Magazine of History, XXXV (March 1930), 43–46
- "A Letter of Daniel Worth to George W. Julian and Other Documents," Indiana Magazine of History, XXVI, (June, 1930), 152–57.
- "The Burnt District", Indiana Magazine of History, XXVII, (June 1931), 119–24.
- "Isaac Hoover Julian", Indiana Magazine of History, XXVIII (March 1932), 9–20.
- "Home Letters of George W. Julian, 1850–1851: Forward", Indiana Magazine of History, XXIX, (June 1933), 130–63.
