= Alexander Holladay =

19th-century politician and lawyer from Virginia

Member of the U.S. House of Representatives from Virginia's 4th district
- In office March 4, 1849 – – March 3, 1853
- Preceded by: Richard L. T. Beale
- Succeeded by: Charles J. Faulkner, Sr.

Member of the Virginia House of Delegates
- In office 1845–2847

Personal details
- Born: Alexander Richmond Holladay; September 18, 1811 Spotsylvania County, Virginia, U.S.
- Died: January 29, 1877 (aged 65) Richmond, Virginia, U.S.
- Resting place: Prospect Hill Cemetery
- Party: Democratic
- Spouse: Patsy Quarles Poindexter (m. 1837)
- Children: Alexander
- Education: University of Virginia
- Occupation: Politician; lawyer

Alexander Richmond Holladay (September 18, 1811 – January 29, 1877) was a 19th-century politician and lawyer from Virginia.

== Early life and background ==
Born on the Prospect Hill plantation, Belmont, in Spotsylvania County(now in Mineral, Virginia), Holladay was the son of Waller Holladay (1776–1860). He had a twin brother, Henry Addison Holladay, and they also had other brothers, Lewis Littlepage Holladay (born 1803), Albert Lewis Holladay (1805–1856), John Zachary Holladay (1806–1842) and Waller Lewis Holladay (1809–1873). Their sister Anne Elizabeth Holladay (1808–1853) married Dr W. Q. Poindexter, a nephew of George Poindexter, Governor of Mississippi. The Holladays were also related to the diplomat and general Lewis Littlepage, who was Littlepage's half-uncle (that is, his father's half-brother).

Alexander Holladay attended public schools as a child and received special training under John Lewis at the Llangollen School, Bel Air, in Spotsylvania County, then attended the University of Virginia, where he studied law.

On September 7, 1837, Holladay married Patsy Quarles Poindexter, a daughter of Judge William Green Poindexter. Their son Alexander Quarles Holladay was born on May 8, 1839.

== Career and death ==
Holladay was admitted to the bar, commencing practice in Spotsylvania, Orange and Louisa Counties, Virginia. From 1845 to 1847 he was a member of the Virginia House of Delegates and held several local offices before being elected a Democrat to the United States House of Representatives in 1848, serving from 1849 to 1853. There, Holladay was chairman of the Committee on Expenditures in the Department of the Navy from 1849 to 1851. He declined reelection in 1852 and moved to Richmond, Virginia in 1853 where he commenced practicing law. Holladay was president of the Virginia Board of Public Works from 1857 to 1861 before his death in Richmond on January 29, 1877. He was interred in the family cemetery called "Prospect Hill" in Spotsylvania County, Virginia.

== Notes ==
U.S. House of Representatives
Preceded by Richard L.T. Beale	Member of the U.S. House of Representatives from Virginia's 8th congressional district March 4, 1849 – March 4, 1853	Succeeded by Charles J. Faulkner
