= John Nesmith =

American businessman and politician (1793–1869)

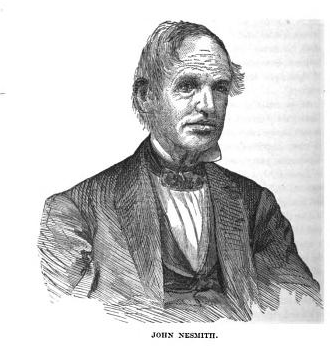

25th Lieutenant Governor of Massachusetts
- In office 1862–1862
- Governor: John Albion Andrew
- Preceded by: John Z. Goodrich
- Succeeded by: Joel Hayden

Personal details
- Born: August 3, 1793; Windham, New Hampshire
- Died: October 15, 1869 (aged 76)
- Political party: Republican

John Nesmith (August 3, 1793 in Windham, New Hampshire – October 15, 1869) was an American politician who served as the 25th lieutenant governor of Massachusetts in 1862.

Historic Homes and Places and Genealogical and Personal Memoirs Relating to the Families of Middlesex County, Mass., Vol 3 writes:

Till his twenty-ninth year, he was intimately connected with the history of his native town and mingled actively in its affairs. He was prominent in politics his early in life; was town treasurer in 1819 and 1820 and representative to the general court in 1821. In 1822, he removed to Derry, formerly a part of the town of Londonderry. He commenced life a comparatively poor boy and had only the education of the common schools of his day. At the age of fourteen, he became clerk in the general store formerly conducted by his father and served an apprenticeship of five years. When he was nineteen years old, he and his elder brother, Thomas, started in business on their own account in a general store at Windham. They prospered and as soon as their cash capital and enlarged credit would warrant the adventure, they removed to New York City and built up a large and highly profitable trade. In 1831, foreseeing the future importance of Lowell, Massachusetts, as a manufacturing center, the brothers settled in that city. Lowell is not far from their native town; doubtless their love for the old New Hampshire hills influenced their selection of a location as well as their personal knowledge of the town and its vast possibilities as a manufacturing place. They invested largely in real estate and identified themselves with every movement and measure calculated to develop the town or increase its prosperity. They were leaders in enterprise and progress, shrewd and farsighted men of affairs. John Nesmith became interested in the manufacture of blankets, flannels, printing cloths, sheetings, and other textile fabrics and that became eventually his principal vocation. He became agent or part owner in mills in Lowell, Dracut, Chelmsford, Hooksct and other places, and managed those enterprises with almost unvarying and uninterrupted success. He was also a large stockholder in the Merrimack Woolen Mills Company. Appreciating more than any other man the natural advantages of the water powers which have made Lowell what he is, he bethought himself of securing the supply of water in Winnepesaukee and Squam lakes in New Hampshire as reservoirs for the Lowell Mills in dry seasons and letting the water into the Merrimac River when needed by artificial canals. This brilliant conception was at first scouted by the manufacturers along the river, but Mr. Nesmith, satisfied that they would eventually require the water, bought the right to use both these lakes for the purpose and before long the manufacturers had to buy of him at a handsome profit.

Mr. Nesmith was the first to discern the natural fitness of the site now occupied by the flourishing city of Lawrence on the Merrimac River for a manufacturing point, and made large purchases of land on both sides of the river, securing also the necessary charter to control the water power. About 1844 his bold scheme attracted the attention it deserved from Boston capitalists, and factories began to rise at Lawrence as if by magic, and that prosperous city has amply vindicated the wisdom of its real founder, John Nesmith. He bought the Gedney estate at Belvidere. Lowell, with its large mansion house, the Old Yellow House, as it was called, erected in 1750. He laid out several streets, giving his name to one of them. His purchase being made soon after the formation of the Merrimack Manufacturing Company, he sold the property to good advantage. While carrying on these varied and arduous undertakings Mr. Nesmith still found time to devote to mechanical study and experiment. Several of his discoveries and inventions were of great importance and value—among others the well-known machines for making wire fence and shawl fringe.

Though naturally averse to mingling in politics, and never stooping to the acts by which popularity is often won, he was elected to various offices in the city government of Lowell, where his sound practical sense and extraordinary business capacity were acknowledged and appreciated by his townsmen of both parties. Like most anti-slavery men he joined the Republican party when it was formed, and he was a presidential elector from his state in the college that choose Abraham Lincoln president both in 1861 and 1865. He contributed freely of his means to assist the anti-slavery movement. He was elected lieutenant-governor of Massachusetts on the ticket with Governor John A. Andrew in 1862 and declined a re-election the following year. He was afterward appointed United States collector of internal revenue for his district, an office in which a zealous and active man could give tangible support to the government in its hour of greatest need by discovering the taxable property and preventing adroit evasions. He filled the position ably and creditably until his resignation only twelve days before he died.

Mr. Nesmith's attachment to the principles of his party was that of the moralist rather than that of the partisan, and he never lost the respect and confidence of either friends or opponents in political affairs. The temperance movement in Massachusetts early engaged his hearty support and liberal contributions, and he was for some years president of the State Alliance. From the large fortune acquired by his tact and industry, he made generous donations to many objects of charity and benevolence which won his sympathy, and was invariably kind and hospitable to his friends and neighbors. In his home he was especially affectionate and charming. He made in his will handsome provision for the care, support and education of the indigent blind of New Hampshire, a foundation known as the Nesmith Fund; and also provided a public park in the town of Franklin, New Hampshire .

Political offices
| Preceded by John Z. Goodrich | Lieutenant Governor of Massachusetts; 1862 | Succeeded by Joel Hayden |
