= James F. Babcock =

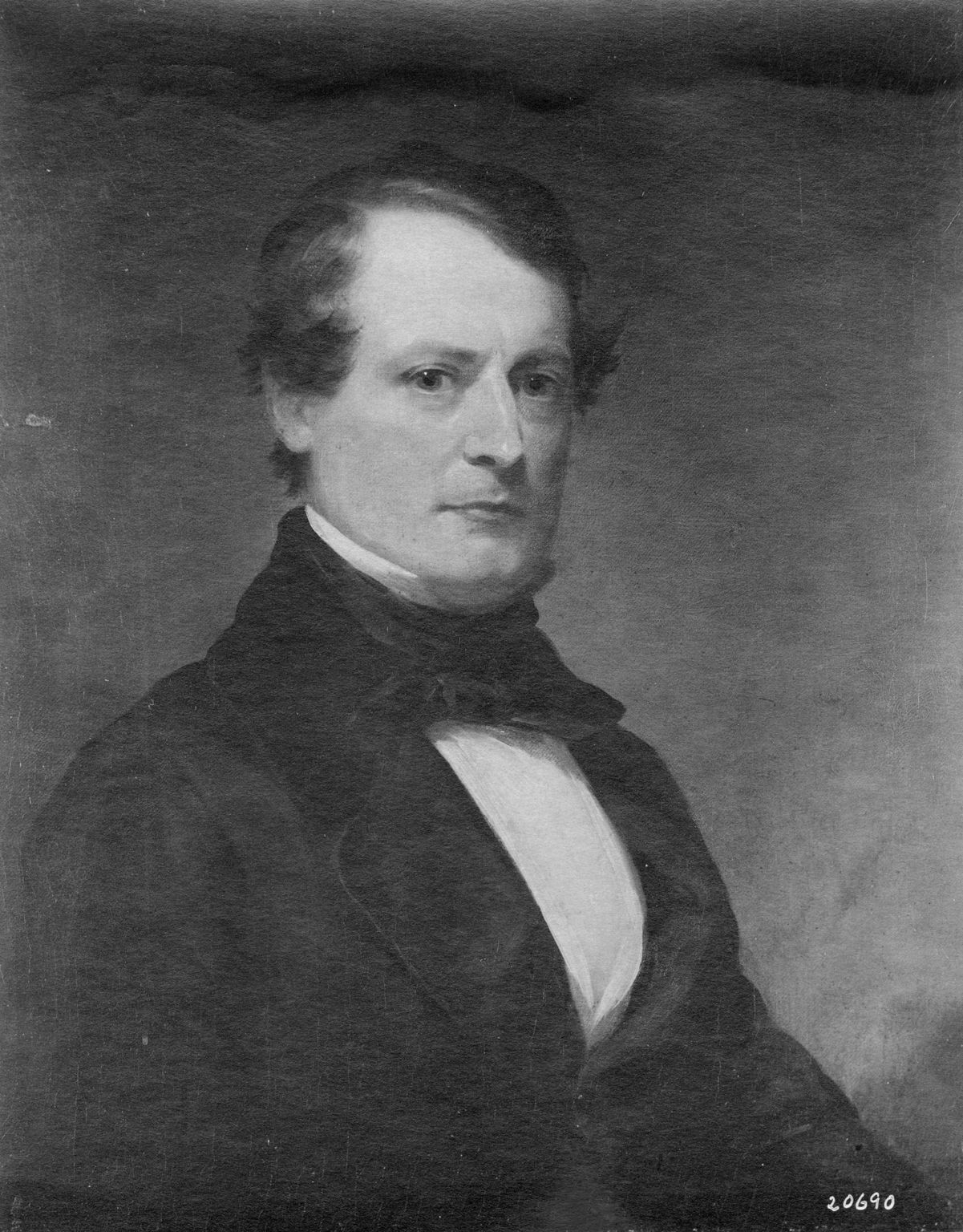
- portrait by George Henry Durrie
- Born: July 9, 1809; New Haven
- Died: June 18, 1874 (aged 64); New Haven
- Occupation: Journalist, judge

James Fairchild Babcock (July 9, 1809 – June 18, 1874) was an American journalist, politician, and judge.

Born on July 9, 1809 in New Haven, Connecticut, James F. Babcock began newspaper work at an early age, and in 1830 became editor of the New-Haven Palladium, which soon began to issue a daily edition and which he conducted for thirty-one years. In 1826, Babcock was also one of the eight founding members of the Apprentices’ Literary Association, also known as the New Haven Young Men's Institute or The Institute Library, a historic membership library of the mechanics’ institute and Lyceum movements whose membership included important New Haven figures, such as Roger S. Baldwin and Charles B. Lines. Babcock served as both president and director of the library during its formative years, and advertisements for the Institute's public lectures and classes were published primarily in the New-Haven Palladium.

Babcock controlled the nominations of the Whig Party for many years, and, though hostile to the Free-Soil Party at its inception, he finally gave it a hearty welcome in 1854. He retained his prestige with the Republican Party for some years, took an active part in furthering the national cause during the American Civil War, and, shortly after his resignation as editor of the Palladium, was appointed, by President Abraham Lincoln, collector of the port of New Haven. He retained that office under President Andrew Johnson, whose policy he supported; and, after the rupture between the president and the Republicans, Babcock acted with the Democratic Party, and, after an angry and excited contest, was nominated by them for the US Congress, but was defeated by the Republican nominee. He was elected by the Democrats to the Connecticut General Assembly in 1873. The legislature of 1874 elected him judge of the police court of New Haven.

James F. Babcock died on June 18, 1874 in New Haven.
