= John Z. Goodrich =

American politician (1804-1885)

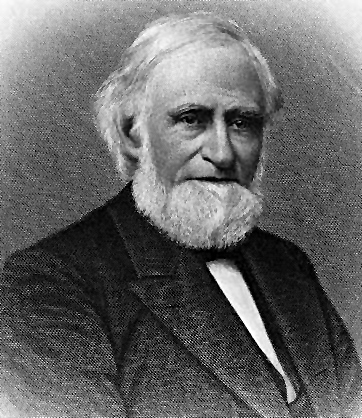

Member of the U.S. House of Representatives from Massachusetts
- In office March 4, 1851 – March 3, 1855
- Preceded by: Julius Rockwell
- Succeeded by: Mark Trafton
- Constituency: 7th district (1851–53); 11th district (1853–55)

24th Lieutenant Governor of Massachusetts
- In office January 1, 1861 – March 29, 1861
- Governor: John Albion Andrew
- Preceded by: Eliphalet Trask
- Succeeded by: John Nesmith

Member of the Massachusetts Senate from the Berkshire district
- In office 1848–1849
- Preceded by: Thomas A. Bowen; Samuel A. Hurlburt
- Succeeded by: Nathan Benjamin; Henry L. Dawes

Collector of Customs for the Port of Boston
- In office 1861–1865
- Preceded by: James Scollay Whitney
- Succeeded by: Hannibal Hamlin

Personal details
- Born: September 27, 1804 Sheffield, Massachusetts
- Died: April 19, 1885 (aged 80) Stockbridge, Massachusetts
- Party: Whig; Republican
- Profession: Lawyer

John Zacheus Goodrich (September 27, 1804 – April 19, 1885) was an American politician who served as a member of the United States House of Representatives and the 24th lieutenant governor of Massachusetts.

== Early life ==
He was born in Sheffield, Massachusetts on September 27, 1804. He attended the common schools and Lenox Academy. He studied law, was admitted to the bar, and engaged in manufacturing; he graduated from Williams College in 1848.

== Political career ==
Goodrich served in the Massachusetts State Senate, and was elected as a Whig to the Thirty-second and Thirty-third Congresses (March 4, 1851 – March 3, 1855).

He was a member of the 1861 Peace Conference held in Washington, D.C., a meeting attempting to prevent the Civil War. Goodrich was later elected as a Republican Lieutenant Governor of Massachusetts in 1860 and served from January 1, 1861, until his resignation on March 29, 1861. He also served as the president of the Union Emigration Society, a group dedicated to organizing the North for political action.

Goodrich was appointed collector of customs at Boston on March 13 and served until March 11, 1865, when he retired from public life. Goodrich died in Stockbridge, Massachusetts on April 19, 1885, and was intered in Stockbridge Cemetery.

He posthumously received one protest vote for Vice President at the 1972 Democratic National Convention.

U.S. House of Representatives
Preceded by Julius Rockwell	Member of the U.S. House of Representatives from Massachusetts's 7th congressional district March 4, 1851 – March 3, 1853	Succeeded by Nathaniel P. Banks
Preceded by District re-established	Member of the U.S. House of Representatives from Massachusetts's 11th congressional district March 4, 1853 – March 3, 1855	Succeeded by Mark Trafton
Political offices
Preceded by Eliphalet Trask	Lieutenant Governor of Massachusetts; 1861	Succeeded by John Nesmith
