= George W. Julian =

American politician and lawyer (1817–1899)

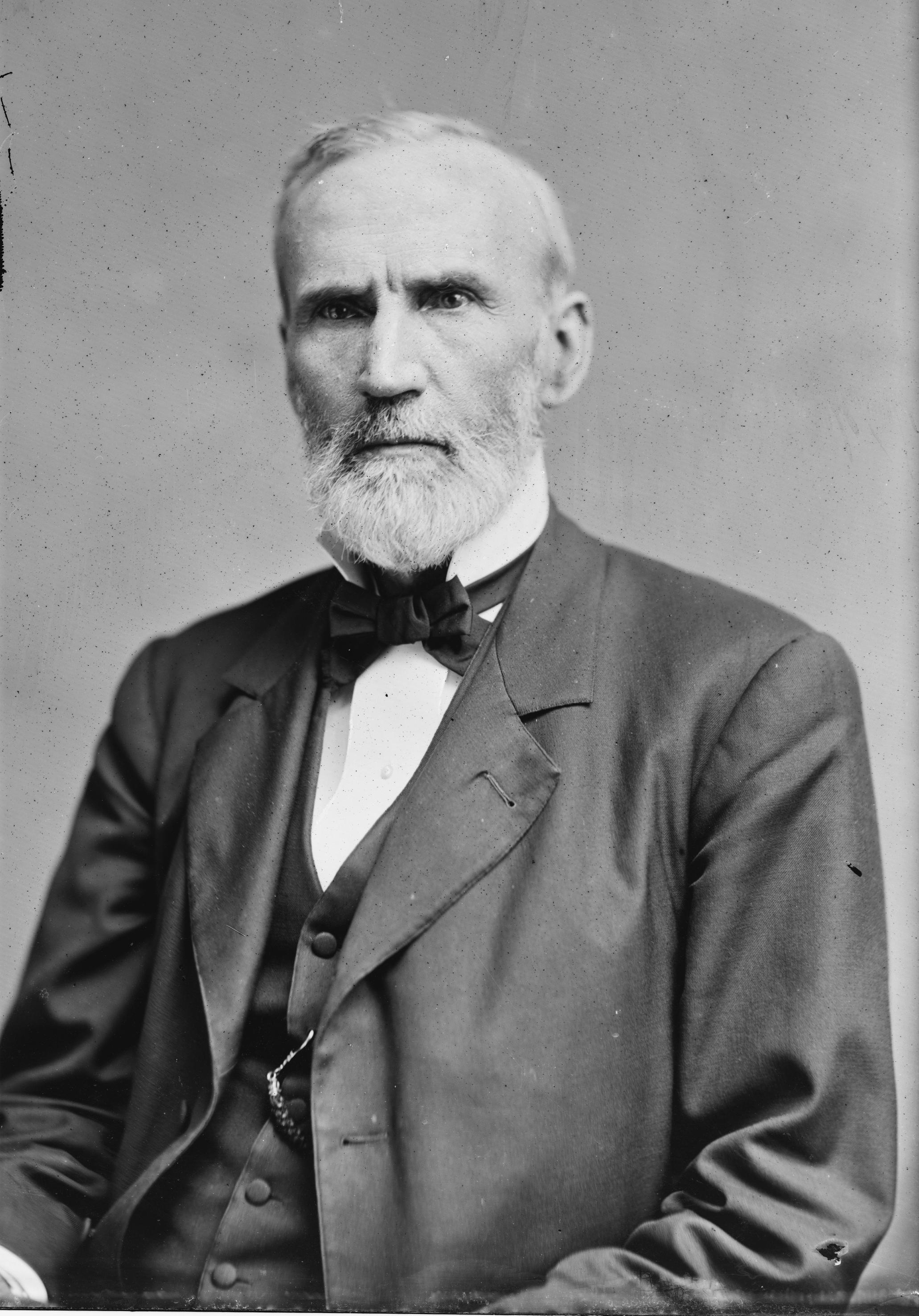

Member of the U.S. House of Representatives from Indiana
- In office March 4, 1849 – March 3, 1851
- Preceded by: Caleb Blood Smith
- Succeeded by: Samuel W. Parker
- Constituency: 4th district
- In office March 4, 1861 – March 3, 1871
- Preceded by: David Kilgore
- Succeeded by: Jeremiah M. Wilson

Personal details
- Born: George Washington Julian; May 5, 1817 Centerville, Indiana, U.S.
- Died: July 7, 1899 (aged 82) Irvington, Indiana, U.S.
- Resting place: Crown Hill Cemetery and Arboretum, Section 27, Lot 196; 39.817645°N 86.170233°W
- Party: Whig (Before 1848); Free Soil (1848–1855); Republican (1855–1872); Liberal Republican (1872–1873); Democratic (1873–1899)
- Spouse(s): Anne Finch (1845–1860); Laura Giddings (1863–1884)
- Children: 5

George Washington Julian (May 5, 1817 – July 7, 1899) was a politician, lawyer, and writer from Indiana who served in the United States House of Representatives during the 19th century. A leading opponent of slavery, Julian was the Free Soil Party's candidate for vice president in the 1852 election and was a prominent Radical Republican during the American Civil War and the Reconstruction era.

In 1885, President Grover Cleveland appointed him surveyor general of the New Mexico Territory. Julian was the son-in-law of Ohio politician Joshua Reed Giddings and the father of Grace Julian Clarke, a women's suffrage advocate.

== Early life and education ==
George Washington Julian was born on May 5, 1817, near Centerville, in Wayne County, Indiana. His Quaker parents, Isaac and Rebecca Julian, had come to Indiana from North Carolina. Isaac died when George was six years old, leaving Rebecca to raise six children.

Julian received a common school education and especially enjoyed reading. At the age of eighteen Julian began a short-lived career as a schoolteacher, but he became dissatisfied with teaching and switched careers. In 1839 a friend suggested that he become a lawyer. Julian studied in the office Centerville attorney John S. Newman. He was admitted to the Indiana bar in 1840 and established a law practice in Greenfield, Indiana before moving back to Centerville to become the law partner with his older brother Jacob.

== Marriage and family ==
Julian married Anne Elizabeth Finch in May 1845, the same year he was elected to the Indiana General Assembly. The couple had three children (Edward, Louis, and Frederick); two of them (Edward and Louis) died young. Anne died of tuberculosis on November 15, 1860, at the age of thirty-four. Frederick, who became an actor, died in 1911.

On December 31, 1863, Julian married Laura Giddings, the daughter of Joshua Reed Giddings, an abolitionist and a U.S. congressman from Ohio. Julian and his second wife had two children, Grace and Paul. Laura died in 1885. Paul became a civil engineer and died in 1929. Grace Julian Clarke became a clubwoman in Indianapolis as well as a women's suffrage advocate. She was one of the founders of the Woman's Franchise League of Indiana. She retained close ties to her father even after her marriage to Charles B. Clarke, an attorney who served as a U.S. deputy surveyor in the New Mexico Territory and also served in the Indiana Senate. A prolific writer with several published books, she was a newspaper columnist for the Indianapolis Star from 1911 to 1929. Her news articles on the political activities of Hoosier women and their counterparts across the country helped to shape public opinion on women's suffrage and other topics. Grace died in 1938.

== Personality and appearance ==
Six feet tall and broad shouldered with a bit of a stoop, Julian was impossible to miss. He also proved to be a challenge to his more moderate colleagues because of his unwillingness to compromise. While campaigning for re-election in 1865, Julian engaged in a violent dispute his opponent, Brigadier General Solomon Meredith, the former commander of the Army of the Potomac's famed Iron Brigade. Meredith eventually attacked Julian with a whip at an Indiana train station, lashing him into unconsciousness, which newspapers described as the "Julian and Meredith Difficulty," labeling both men cowards for their involvement.

In 1866 a reporter noticed Julian's "worn, scarred, seamed and earnest face" from the congressional galleries and remarked: "It is not a pleasant countenance to look upon, but rather grim and belligerent, touched perhaps with a little sense of weary sadness, which grows as you observe. Mr. Julian's head, face, and figure, is of the Round-head, Cromwellian type." An 1868 Philadelphia newspaper described a Washington correspondent's observation of Julian at a congressional reception: "Nature was in one of her most generous moods when she formed him," he wrote, "for he towers above the people like a mountain surrounded by hills. He dwells in a higher atmosphere and snuffs a purer air than most Congressmen, and this may account for his always being found in the right place, never doubtful. People know just what George Washington Julian will do in any national crisis."

== Career ==
Julian was a member of five different parties during his political career. He served as a Whig member of the Indiana General Assembly and was elected to five terms in the U.S. House of Representatives, one of them as a member of the Free Soil Party and four as a Republican. He was also the Free Soil Party's nominee for U.S. vice president in the 1852 election, but Julian and John P. Hale, the party's presidential nominee, were defeated without winning a single electoral vote. Julian joined the Liberal Republicans in 1872 and supported the Democrats in 1877. He became a member of the Democratic Party in 1884. Julian is best known for his staunch opposition to slavery, as well as his support of land reform and women's suffrage. Julian countered the frequent criticisms for switching his political alliances by arguing that the parties had altered their positions on political issues, especially slavery, while his views had remained unchanged.

=== Whig ===
Julian began his political career in 1845. when he was elected to the Indiana House of Representatives as a Whig from Centerville. Julian voted in favor of the Butler bill dealing with the large debts the state incurred as part of its major internal improvement projects, but the move cost him the party's support and the Whig nomination for a seat in the Indiana Senate in 1847. Around this time Julian, who was raised a Quaker, began to change his religious views to Unitarianism. He also became active in Indiana's antislavery movement.

=== Free Soil party candidate ===
Julian helped found the Free Soil Party, and was a delegate to the party's convention in Buffalo, New York, in 1848. In December he announced his intention to run for Congress and won election as a Free Soil candidate to the U.S. House of Representatives in 1849.

Julian's election came through a coalition with the Democratic Party in Indiana's Fourth Congressional District, the so-called "Burnt District," in the central-southeastern part of the state. The selection seemed, on its face, peculiar. Indiana's Democratic Party was, if anything, less friendly toward antislavery views than its counterparts in Ohio or Illinois, although many of its members favored the exclusion of slavery from territories acquired from Mexico in the recent war. Julian's district was staunchly pro-Whig, and a Democratic nominee had little chance of winning. The district's large Quaker population made it one of the stronger antislavery districts as well. On economic issues Julian's positions leaned more toward the Democrats' doctrines than the Whigs'. He opposed high protective tariffs and had no interest in creating a new national bank. Julian received the support of the Democrats and won election to the Thirty-first Congress in 1849. He was among a small bloc of about twelve votes consisting of Free Soilers and a few others.

Julian's interest in land reform began in the 1840s and continued for the remainder of his life, although his most significant reform work in this area took place during his twelve-year career in the U.S. Congress. Julian envisioned families working for themselves on farms that did not rely on slave labor and became concerned with U.S. land policies. On January 29, 1851, he delivered his first House speech in support of Andrew Johnson's homestead bill, but Congress failed to approve the legislation.

By 1851, when Julian ran for re-election, the state's political conditions had changed significantly. Under the influence of Indiana's U.S. Senator Jesse D. Bright and others, the state's Democratic Party had become more rigidly opposed to any congressional restriction on slavery in the Mexican cession and supported the Compromise of 1850 and Fugitive Slave Law. In addition, a new state constitution had just been drafted that included a clause (Article XIII, Section 1) that prohibited blacks from migrating into the state. (The clause was removed from the state's constitution by amendment in 1881.) In this antislavery climate the Free Soil and Democratic coalition to elect Julian ran into serious difficulties. Julian found some Democratic support, but not the backing that he had enjoyed in the 1849 election, and he lost to Samuel W. Parker, a conservative Whig who had been his opponent in the 1849 election as well.

In the 1852 presidential election, the Free Soilers (who had named themselves the Free Democracy Party) nominated John P. Hale of New Hampshire as its presidential candidate and found themselves in need of a midwestern man to balance the ticket. Although Julian did not attend the convention in Pittsburgh, the party nominated him for the vice-presidency. Hale and Julian did not win any electoral votes and lost the election to Franklin Pierce and William R. King. (Hale and Julian only received 155,210 popular votes, less than 5 percent of the total.) Julian also lost a bid for election to Congress in 1854, when the Kansas–Nebraska Act reopened the slavery debate and accelerated major changes in the country's political party system. Julian joined the People's Party, the precursor to the new Republican party in the state, and became the leader of its antislavery faction.

=== Republican ===
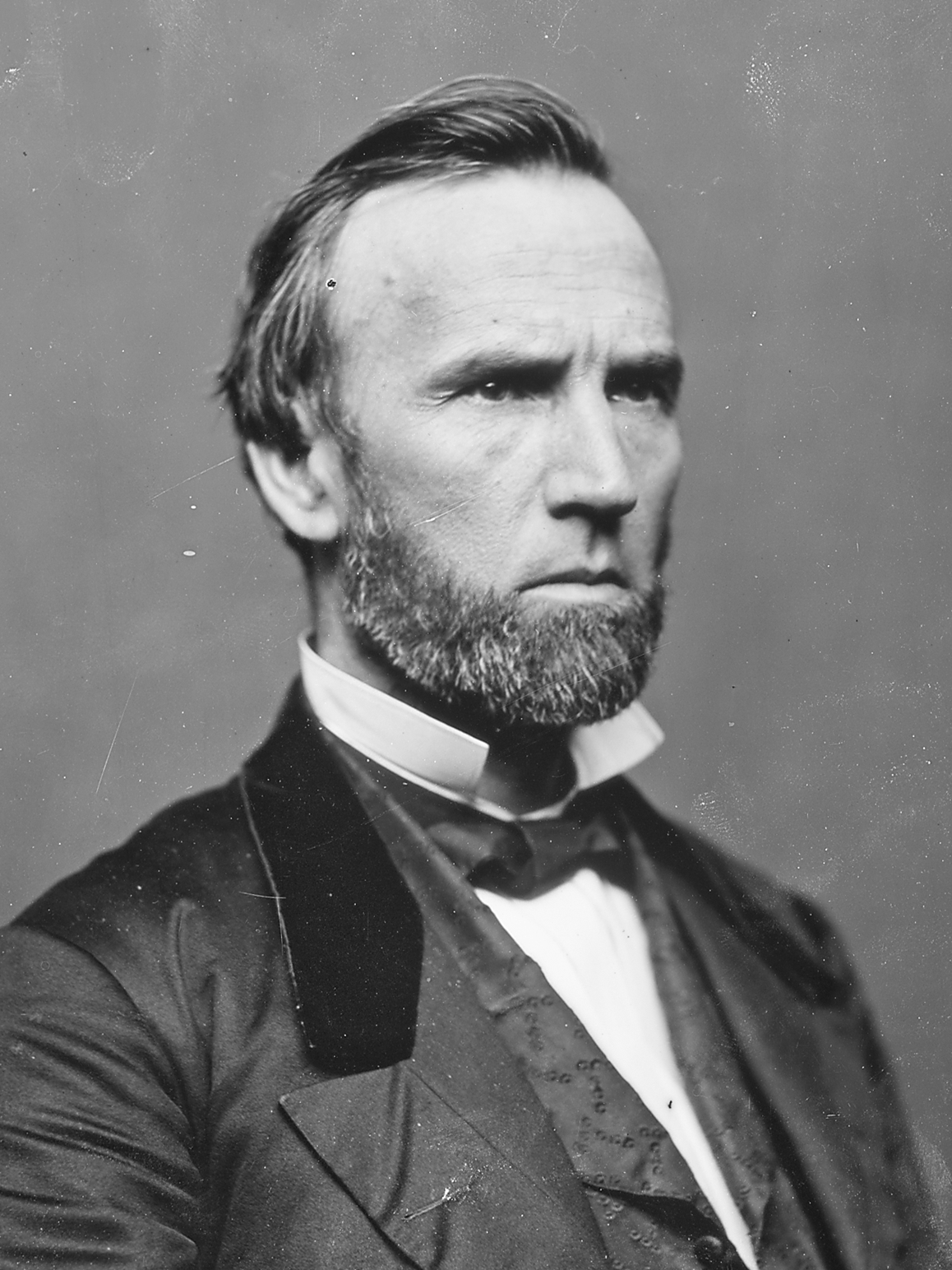
Julian in the early 1860s

In 1856 Julian was a delegate to the convention in Philadelphia, Pennsylvania, where the Republican Party chose John C. Frémont as their candidate for president in the 1856 United States presidential election. Julian served as chairman of the committee on national organization. In 1860 he was elected as a Republican to the Thirty-seventh Congress, and won re-election in the Thirty-eighth, Thirty-ninth, Fortieth, and Forty-first Congresses, serving from 1861 to 1871. Julian, among the most radical of the U.S. House Republicans, was an ardent abolitionist who also became known for his support of civil rights, women's suffrage, and land reform. Appointed to the congressional Committee on Public Lands in 1861, he also served as its chairman from 1863 to 1871. In addition, Julian was chairman of the Expenditures in the Navy Department (Thirty-ninth Congress).

==== Civil War ====
During the American Civil War, Julian called for arming blacks and for their enlistment as Union soldiers. In 1864, during the Thirty-eighth Congress, he was unsuccessful in his effort to repeal the Fugitive Slave Law. (It was tabled by a 66 to 51 vote, but a similar bill became law two years later.) Julian also challenged the pleas that called for the war to be fought within constitutional limits. Taking the House floor to counter "the never-ending gabble about the sacredness of the Constitution," Julian told his colleagues, "It will not be forgotten that the red-handed murderers and thieves who set this rebellion on foot went out of the Union yelping for the Constitution which they had conspired to overthrow by the blackest perjury and treason that ever confronted the Almighty."

As a member of the Joint Committee on the Conduct of the War, Julian investigated military as well as civil conduct. The committee had no policy-making function; however, it made recommendations for prosecution of the war and served an avenue for the radical Republicans to force their policies on the Abraham Lincoln administration. He investigated Confederate atrocities and the mistreatment of prisoners of war, hectored generals who showed insufficient zeal in pressing on the fight, and pursued committee's most important objective, securing the dismissal of Union Army general George B. McClellan, whose slowness in advancing on the enemy Julian saw as nearly treasonable.

Julian played an important role in securing passage of the Homestead Act in 1862. To Julian the legislation "was a magnificent triumph of freedom and free labor over slave power." After discovering that the law contained many loopholes that favored land speculators, he introduced measures to correct the situation. Julian was also an outspoken critic of railroad land grants and adamantly opposed the Morrill Act, passed in 1862, that provided federal funds through grants to help establish agricultural and mechanical colleges.

Although Julian did not dislike Lincoln personally, he opposed some of the president's policies, which were more moderate than his own. Julian was among the radical Republicans who feared that Lincoln would not issue the final Emancipation Proclamation on January 1, 1863. "But he saw no way of escape," Julian wrote in his memoirs. "The demand for such an edict was wide-spread and rapidly extending in the Republican party ... It was in yielding to [radical] pressure that he finally became the liberator of the slaves through the triumph of our arms which it ensured."

Julian also supported the idea of confiscating property belonging to those who rebelled against the United States, and joined other radicals to vote in favor of the Second Confiscation Act in 1862. Julian wanted the forfeited land to be divided into free homesteads and distributed among those who served in the Union military or others who aided the Union during the war. Black laborers would be among those eligible for the free homesteads. Julian also wanted these confiscations to be permanent, but Lincoln preferred to limit their duration. On March 18, 1864, Julian introduced a House bill to establish homesteads on the confiscated lands in the South. It passed the House along party lines, with a vote of 75 to 64; however, U.S. Attorney General James Speed halted the confiscations before the Senate could take up the bill.

==== Post-war and Reconstruction ====
Julian was initially supportive of a radical Republican challenge to Lincoln's nomination for re-election in 1864. He briefly joined the campaign to nominate U.S. Secretary of the Treasury Salmon P. Chase, but severed his ties to Chase's nominating committee and supported Lincoln in the 1864 presidential election. Julian opposed Lincoln's Reconstruction policy, preferring the plans outlined in the Wade–Davis Bill of 1864, and became a strong advocate of giving the former slaves voting rights.

In January 1865 Julian voted in favor of the Thirteenth Amendment to abolish slavery in the United States. He was proud of his role in that regard. Julian equated those who voted for the Amendment to the signers of the Declaration of Independence:

The greatest event of this century occurred yesterday in the passage of the Constitutional Amendment in the House. The spectacle during the vote was the most solemn and impressive I ever witnessed. The result for a good while remained in doubt, and the suspense produced perfect stillness. When it was certainly known that the measure had carried, the cheering in the hall and densely packed galleries exceeded anything I ever saw before and beggared description. Members joined in the shouting, and kept it up for some minutes. Some embraced one another, others wept like children. I never before felt as I then did, and thanked God for the blessed opportunity of recording my name where it will be honored as those of the signers of the Declaration of Independence. What a grand jubilee for the old battle-scarred Abolitionists. Glorious fruit of the war. I have felt, ever since the vote, as if I were in a new country. I seem to breathe better, and feel comforted and refreshed.

Unlike many other radical Republicans, Julian wanted the former Confederates punished for their rebellion against the United States. He called for hanging Jefferson Davis. "And I would not stop with Davis," he told an Indianapolis crowd in November, 1865. "Why should I? There is old General Lee, as hungry for the gallows as Davis. [Applause.] ... I would hang liberally while I had my hand in." In 1865 a Cincinnati newspaper reported that Julian thought a score of former Confederate leaders should be executed and their estates should be confiscated. He went on to suggest that these lands should be parceled out to poor people, white and black, in the South, including Union soldiers and sailors.

=== Johnson Impeachment ===
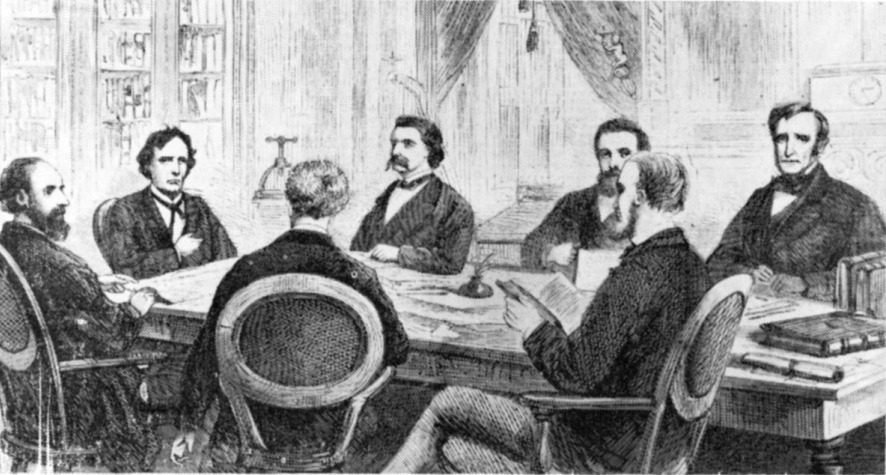
Illustration of the seven-member committee drafting the articles of impeachment against President Johnson. From left to right: Thaddeus Stevens, James F. Wilson, Hamilton Ward (back of head), John A. Logan, George S. Boutwell, George Washington Julian, John Bingham.

Julian was one of the first to call for President Andrew Johnson's impeachment, although he was not chosen for the board of impeachment managers assigned to prosecute the case before the Senate. In 1867 Julian was appointed as one of the seven-person House committee tasked with drafting the articles of impeachment against the president. In the impeachment trial, the U.S. Senate did not find the president guilty on the articles, allowing Johnson to complete his term in office. Later, Julian considered the impeachment movement as an act of "party madness." In his memoirs Julian was careful to downplay his role in recommending Johnson's impeachment.

=== Voting rights ===
Although Julian's primary political goal in the 1850s and 1860s was the abolition of slavery and challenging its expansion into the western United States, he was a longtime supporter of women's enfranchisement. Julian had espoused the cause of women's suffrage as early as 1847. As Julian explained in his memoirs, "the subject was first brought to my attention in a brief chapter on 'the political non-existence of woman,' in Miss [Harriett] Martineau's book on 'Society In America,' which I read in 1847. She there pithily states the substance of all that has since been said respecting the logic of woman's right to the ballot, and finding myself unable to answer it, I accepted it. On recently referring to this chapter I find myself more impressed by its force than when I first read it." While campaigning in 1853 Julian invited Frances Dana Barker Gage and Emma R. Coe, early advocates for woman suffrage, to lecture in his hometown of Centreville. Julian was also close friends with Lucretia Mott, co-organizer of the Seneca Falls Convention. Following the Civil War and passage of the Thirteenth Amendment, Julian returned to the issue of woman's rights. In 1868 he proposed a constitutional amendment on women's suffrage, but it was defeated.

"He uses vinegar when he might scatter sugar," a Republican newspaper in Ohio complained. The report also noted the congressman had a prickly personality and little tolerance for his opponents. The new report explained that those who crossed him discovered his "unfortunate temper and his determination to fight to the bitter end." Among Julian's numerous political adversaries was Oliver P. Morton, the powerful Republican governor of Indiana. Morton's views on the treatment of former Confederates was similar to Julian's, but Morton came late to the cause of black suffrage. As late as 1865 Morton had given a speech arguing that southern blacks were not yet fitted for the vote. Where Julian had broken early with Johnson, Morton continued to support Johnson into early 1866, hoping to prevent a party split between Congress and the president. In 1867 Morton gerrymandered Julian's district, which was strongly antislavery and unshakeable in its support for the congressman, by replacing several of its most radical counties with pro-Democratic ones. As a result, Julian had a hard fight and barely won re-election in 1868, amid accusation of voting fraud in Richmond, Indiana.

In 1869 Congress passed the Fifteenth Amendment giving black men the right to vote, and Julian persuaded himself that the fight against slavery had been won. As his memoirs noted, some of the most prominent and consistent enemies of slavery—Salmon P. Chase, Charles Sumner, and Horace Greeley, especially—had been all but forced out of the Republican Party that they had helped to create. In his bid for re-election to Congress in 1870, Julian faced a strong conservative challenger, Judge Jeremiah M. Wilson, for the nomination. Among the eleven Republican newspapers in Indiana's Fourth District, only three backed Julian, the remaining eight supported his opponent. Julian lost in the Republican primary and withdrew from the race. Julian supported the Republicans in the fall election, but his endorsement of the winning nominee lagged until late in the campaign and he did not actively campaign for the party's candidate.

=== Liberal Republican ===
In 1872, two years after his defeat in the Republican primary for reelection to Congress, Julian joined the Liberal Republicans and became one of its leaders. Julian and other Republicans were "disgusted" by the corruption in Ulysses S. Grant's administration. At the Liberal Republican convention in Cincinnati, Ohio, on May 1, 1872, Horace Greeley received the party's nomination for president. Julian was among the contenders for the vice presidential nomination; however, Benjamin Gratz Brown emerged from the convention as the party's vice presidential nominee on the second ballot. Julian, who supported Greeley in the 1872 presidential election, received five electoral votes for the vice-presidency, but Grant won the presidential election and his running mate, Henry Wilson, won the vice presidential race.

After Grant's reelection, Julian left Washington, D.C., and returned to Centerville. In 1873 the former congressman and his family settled in Irvington, a suburban community east of downtown Indianapolis, where he remained active in politics and practiced law.

=== Democrat ===
When the Liberal Republicans remerged with the Republicans, Julian did not join them. Instead, he supported the Democrats. Julian shared Democratic views on the tariff, on currency questions, and on the fight against the railroads, land speculators, and monopolists. He also opposed the abuses of patronage power. Julian supported the Democratic ticket in 1877.

Julian became a member of the Democratic Party in 1884, and continued his support of women's suffrage, temperance, and land reform. In 1885 President Grover Cleveland appointed Julian surveyor general of New Mexico. Julian served in that capacity from July 1885 until September 1889.

== Later years ==
Unlike many old radicals, Julian prospered in retirement. His work on the federal lands committee in the U.S. House made Julian much in demand as a legal counsel in land cases, earning him substantial legal fees.

In his later years Julian lived in Indianapolis, where he settled in the Irvington community, and remained active in politics and focused on literary pursuits. Julian wrote several works on the era's political scene and a biography of his father-in-law, Joshua R. Giddings. Political Recollections (1884), Julian's memoir is based in part on his diaries, some of which have since been lost. His recollections are unusually truthful and, on occasion, he noted his own mistakes. For the most part the memoirs reflect Julian's principles, as well as his own steadfast belief that his position was right and nearly everyone else's was wrong. Julian maintained that his political positions were accurate and his motives were sincere.

== Death and legacy ==
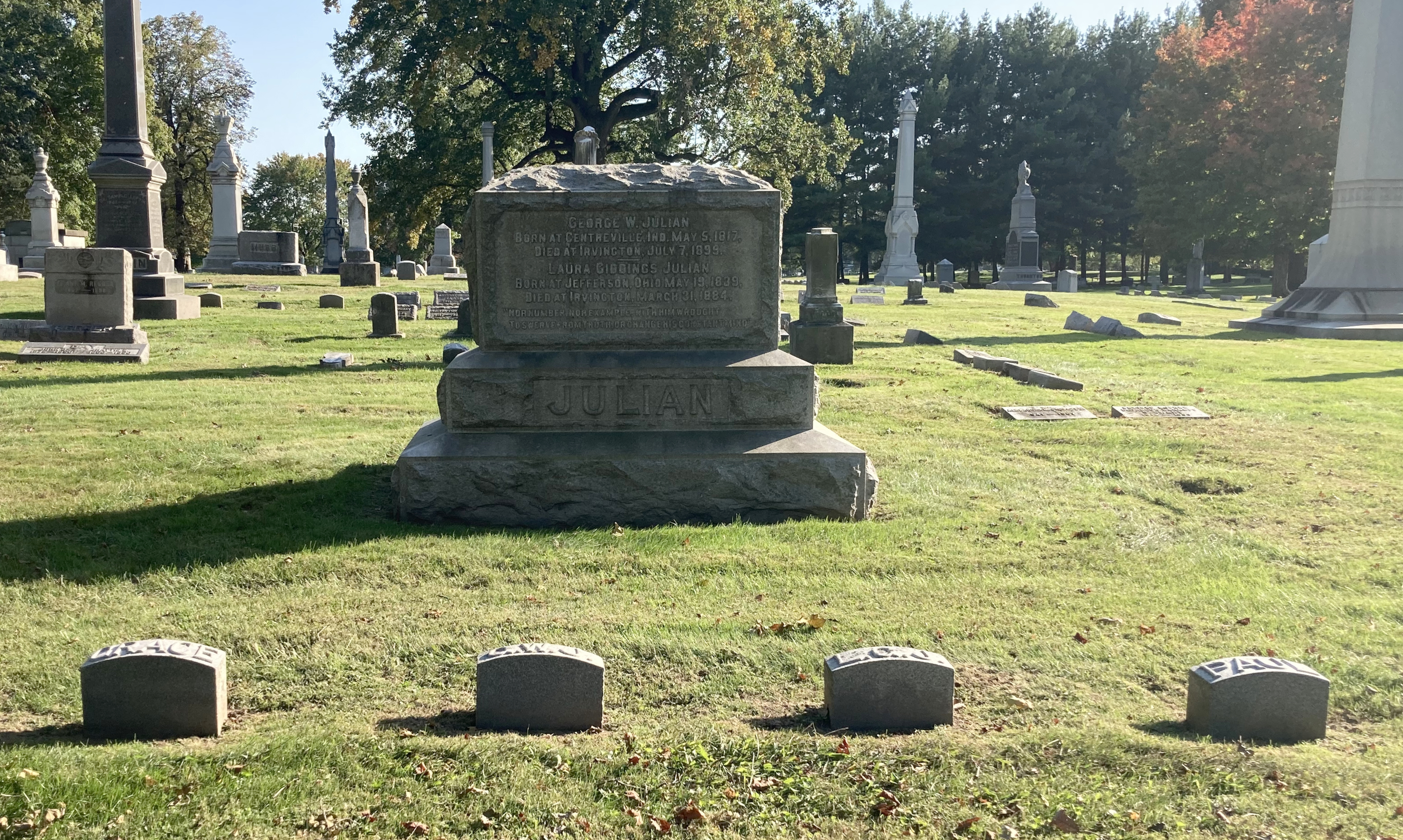
Julian's grave at Crown Hill Cemetery

Julian died on July 7, 1899, in Irvington. His remains are interred at Crown Hill Cemetery in Indianapolis.

While representing Indiana's citizens in the U.S. Congress, Julian became known for his strong character and for his antislavery agitation during the American Civil War and Reconstruction era. Less known were his interests in land reform and women's suffrage. An obituary published at the time of Julian's death described the radical politician as a "doctrinaire rather than a statesman" and remembered him as an "eloquent speaker," a "forceful writer", and a "powerful champion" of the causes he favored. Julian was also characterized as an "impatient," "arrogant," and "self-righteous" reformer who was hardworking and remained steadfast in his beliefs.

Indianapolis Public School Number 57 was named in Julian's honor.

== Selected published works ==
- The Rebellion, The Mistakes of the Past, The Duty of the Present (1863)
- Homesteads for Soldiers on the Lands of Rebels (1864)
- Sale of Mineral Lands (1865)
- Radicalism and Conservation––The Truth of History Vindicated (1865)
- The Rights of Pre-emptors on the Public Lands of the Government Threatened, The Conspiracy Exposed (1866)
- Suffrage in the District of Columbia (1866)
- Regeneration before Reconstruction (1867)
- Biology versus Theology. The Bible: irreconcilable with Science, Experience, and even its own statements (1871)
- Speeches on Political Questions (1872)
- Political Recollections, 1840 to 1872 (1884)
- The Rank of Charles Osborn as an Anti-slavery Pioneer (1891)
- The Life of Joshua R. Giddings (1892)

Julian's daughter, Grace Julian Clarke, collected and published a book of his speeches, Later Speeches on Political Questions: With Select Controversial Papers (1889), as well as George W. Julian: Some Impressions (1902), a volume of her own recollections of him. She also wrote George W. Julian (1923), a biography of her father that became the first volume in the Indiana Historical Commission's Indiana biography series.

== Notes ==
U.S. House of Representatives
Preceded by Caleb Blood Smith	Member of the U.S. House of Representatives from Indiana's 4th congressional district 1849–1851	Succeeded by Samuel W. Parker
Preceded by David Kilgore	Member of the U.S. House of Representatives from Indiana's 5th congressional district 1861–1869	Succeeded by John Coburn
Preceded by John F. Potter	Chair of the House Public Lands Committee; 1863–1871	Succeeded by John H. Ketcham
Preceded by William S. Holman	Member of the U.S. House of Representatives from Indiana's 4th congressional district 1869–1871	Succeeded by Jeremiah M. Wilson
Party political offices
Preceded by Charles Francis Adams Sr.	Free Soil nominee for Vice President of the United States; 1852	Party dissolved
