= Joel Hayden =

American politician (1798–1873)

26th Lieutenant Governor of Massachusetts
- In office 1863–1866
- Governor: John Albion Andrew
- Preceded by: John Nesmith
- Succeeded by: William Claflin

Personal details
- Born: April 8, 1798
- Died: November 10, 1873 (aged 75)
- Political party: Republican

Joel Hayden (April 8, 1798 – November 10, 1873), was an American industrialist and politician who served as the 26th lieutenant governor of Massachusetts from 1863 to 1866.

In 1857, Amherst College accepted a gift from Joel Hayden – a bronze neo-classical sculpture named after Sabrina, Goddess of the Britons.

Hayden owned several business and mills in Haydenville, Massachusetts, a borough of Williamsburg, Massachusetts, including a brass factory, gas works, cotton factory, and foundry. He was also a part-owner of the Williamsburg Reservoir Company, which built the shoddy Williamsburg Reservoir, completed in 1866. On May 16, 1874, several months after Hayden's death, the dam failed catastrophically, causing a flood that killed 139 people and destroyed all four of Hayden's factories.

Political offices
Preceded by John Nesmith	Lieutenant Governor of Massachusetts; 1863–1866	Succeeded by William Claflin
