= Samuel W. Parker =

American politician (1805–1859)

Samuel Wilson Parke

Member of the U.S. House of Representatives from Indiana
- In office March 4, 1851 – March 3, 1855
- Preceded by: George W. Julian (4th); Thomas A. Hendricks (5th)
- Succeeded by: Jim Lane (4th); David P. Holloway (5th)
- Constituency: 4th district (1851-53); 5th district (1853-55)

Personal details
- Party: Whig

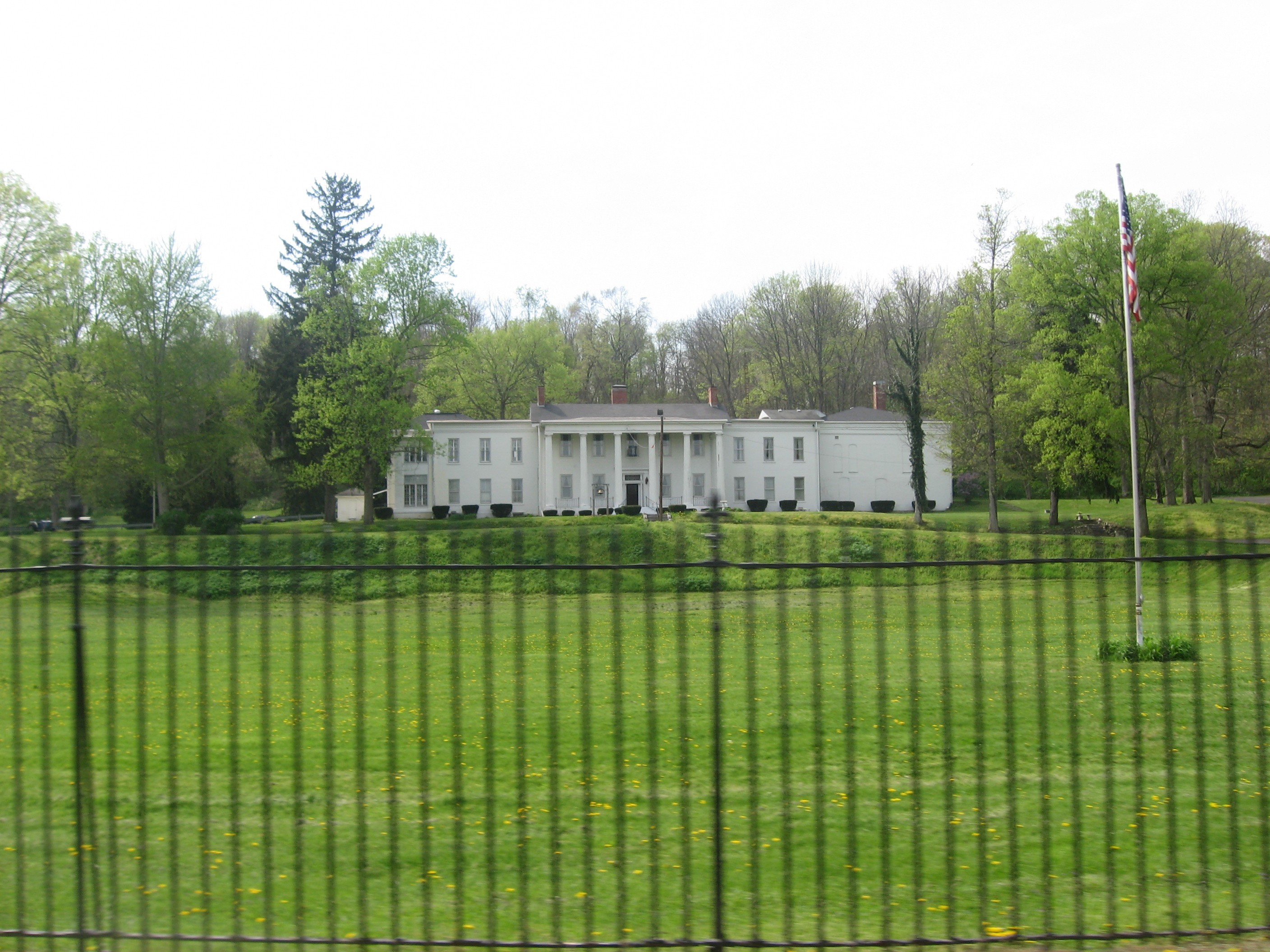
Elmhurst, Parker's Connersville home

Samuel Wilson Parker (September 9, 1805 – February 1, 1859), was an American lawyer and politician who served two terms as a U.S. representative from Indiana from 1851 to 1855.

== Biography ==
Of German and English ancestry, Parker was born near Watertown, New York. He pursued academic studies. He was graduated from Miami University, Oxford, Ohio, in 1828. He studied law. He was admitted to the bar in 1831 and commenced practice in Connersville, Indiana. He served as prosecuting attorney of Fayette County from December 10, 1836, to December 10, 1838.

=== Political career ===
He served as member of the State house of representatives in 1839 and 1843. He served in the State senate 1841–1843. He was an unsuccessful candidate for election in 1849 to the Thirty-first Congress.

Parker was elected as a Whig to the Thirty-second and Thirty-third Congresses (March 4, 1851 – March 3, 1855). He did not seek renomination in 1855.

=== Death ===
He died near Sackets Harbor, New York, February 1, 1859. He was interred in the private cemetery on the Old Elm farm,, in Connersville, Indiana.

U.S. House of Representatives
Preceded by George W. Julian	Member of the U.S. House of Representatives from Indiana's 4th congressional district 1851–1853	Succeeded by James H. Lane
Preceded by Thomas A. Hendricks	Member of the U.S. House of Representatives from Indiana's 5th congressional district 1853–1855	Succeeded by David P. Holloway
