= Adeline Trafton =

American novelist

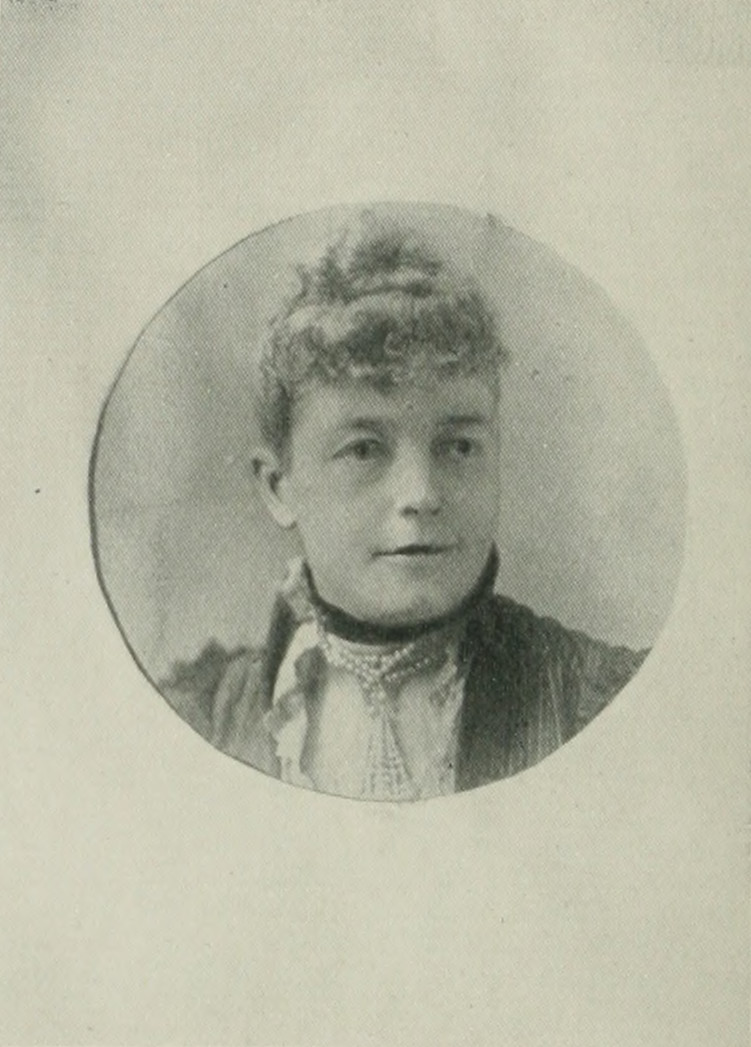
- Portrait photo from A Woman of the Century

Adeline Trafton Knox (February 8, 1845-January 27, 1920) was an American writer and novelist; she published most of her work in the 1870s.

A daughter of minister (and one-term member of U.S. Congress) Mark Trafton, Trafton was born in Saccarappa, Maine around 1842 (sources vary, it was likely closer to 1842 though many say February 8, 1845). She studied for a time at Wesleyan Female College in Wilmington, Delaware. She began publishing short pieces in the Springfield Republican newspaper in 1868 under a pseudonym. In 1872, a series of her foreign letters published in that paper were released in book form as An American Girl Abroad.

Two novels were serialized in Scribner's Monthly before being published in book form, including Katherine Earle (1874) and His Inheritance (1878). In 1889 she married lawyer Samuel Knox, Jr. (d. 1897). Her 1890 work Dorothy's Experience first appeared in serial form in the Christian Union. She was opposed to women's suffrage.

A 1980 volume on American women writers opined that Trafton is little remembered now, and likely did not have much impact on other writers of her time. Yet, although "her plots, by modern standards, seem contrived and sentimental ... she wrote lively, interesting stories" and "remained popular with young readers for at least a few decades."

== Bibliography ==
- An American Girl Abroad (Lee & Shepard 1872)
- Katherine Earle (Lee & Shepard 1874)
- His Inheritance (Lee & Shepard 1878)
- Dorothy's Experience (Lee & Shepard 1890)
