= Bel Air, Virginia =

Unincorporated community in Virginia, US

Coordinates: 38°20′8″N 77°26′3″W

Bel Air is an unincorporated community in Stafford County, in the U.S. state of Virginia.
