= Louis Littlepage =

American diplomat (1762–1802)

Louis Littlepage or Lewis Littlepage (1762–1802) was an American diplomat, who most notably served in the royal court of the last Polish King, Stanisław August Poniatowski.

== Biography ==
The life and career of Lewis Littlepage are remarkable for their reach into so many of the centers of power during the late eighteenth century. Biographies by Curtis Carroll Davis and Nell Holladay Boand follow the trail with many references and excerpts from the original correspondence.

=== Youth ===
Littlepage was born on December 19, 1762, in Hanover County, Virginia or New Kent County, Virginia (accounts vary), the son of a prominent citizen, Colonel James Littlepage.

Lewis Littlepage's father, James Littlepage, was the first Clerk of Louisa County, and was elected to the House of Burgesses of Hanover in 1764. Lewis was the elder of two children from his father's second marriage, in 1761, to Elizabeth (Betty) Lewis. After the Colonel's death in 1764, Betty married Lewis Holladay, (who rose to the rank of major during the American Revolution) of Spotsylvania County. This resulted in Littlepage having a half-brother, Waller Holladay (1776–1860), the father of U. S. Representative Alexander Holladay (1811–1877).

=== Early years ===
After distinction in studies at the College of William and Mary in Williamsburg, Virginia, Littlepage first went to Europe in 1780 under the head of the American delegation to Spain, John Jay. He fought and was wounded in the invasion of Minorca in 1781, while acting as a volunteer aide de camp to the Duc de Crillon. During the sea battle of the Great Siege of Gibraltar, Littlepage was an observer aboard the Spanish fleet; he made extensive notes and sketches that were well received at the Spanish court. The assault that took place however was a huge defeat for the Bourbon allies; Littlepage was on board a floating battery that was sunk, but he was saved. Subsequently in Cadiz, he met the Marquis de Lafayette with whom he journeyed to Paris in 1783. After a bitter dispute with John Jay over a perceived insult, Littlepage left Paris, on an expedition with the Prince of Nassau. He traveled to the Polish–Lithuanian Commonwealth, where he observed the Sejm session that took place in Grodno in 1784.

=== Service to the Polish king ===
At that meeting he was offered and accepted a post in the royal court of the Polish King, Stanisław August Poniatowski. Littlepage then travelled back to Virginia in 1785, to work out family problems and to request the Continental Congress not to revoke his American citizen citizenship due to his projected service to the government of another nation. While in Virginia, he met with Patrick Henry and with George Washington. In New York he had a second unfortunate encounter with John Jay resulting in bitter newspaper exchanges. Brockholst Livingston (companion from Madrid) helped Littlepage get free from legal snags in time for his ship's departure.

On his return to Europe, Littlepage first met Thomas Jefferson in Paris and subsequently continued on to Poland, where he advanced quickly. He was sworn in as First Confidential Secretary to the King, with the rank of Chamberlain in 1786. In 1787 he participated in a diplomatic mission to the Russian Court at a celebratory meeting near Kiev. Littlepage headed a mission to Versailles in 1787-88 with the goal of increasing protection for Poland by promoting an alliance between Russia, France, Austria, and Spain. For this mission, Poniatowski made Littlepage his acting representative to France, effectively replacing the ailing Count Monnet.

After successful diplomacy but a blocked mission, Littlepage left France, and joined in the Russo-Turkish War led by Prince Potemkin. First Littlepage served as aide de camp for Potemkin; then he commanded five vessels under Prince de Nassau and lastly under John Paul Jones. In late 1788 he returned to the Polish capital, and was sent to Austria, Italy and finally Spain (Madrid). In 1790 he received the Order of Saint Stanislaw. In 1791, Littlepage was back in Warsaw, and carried out various diplomatic missions for Stanislas II that supported the Constitution of May 3, 1791).

At the time of the Second Partition of Poland in 1793, King Stanislas wrote a letter to Littlepage, apologizing for being unable to pay him properly for his long service (at that time, Poniatowski and the Polish treasury were in debt and subject to Russian command). Poniatowski promised a sum of 24,000 ducats, with a note that he was then unable to pay, but authorized Littlepage to seek this compensation even after his death. At that point, the Russian ambassador to Poland, Jacob Sievers, prevented Littlepage from communicating with the Czarina on behalf of Stanislas but did promise to honor his debt to Littlepage when it became possible.

In 1794 Kosciuszko led a bloody insurrection that surprisingly expelled the Russians from Poland for many months. Littlepage joined in the battle to defend Vilna from the Russians. For his service to the Russians in the Black Sea campaign, the Supreme National Council (central civil government of Poland, loyal to the Kościuszko Insurrection) initially accused Littlepage of being a traitor. Littlepage protested and sought letters from Tadeusz Kosciuszko and from King Stanislas; both strongly supported his loyalty to an independent Poland. This support for Polish causes cooled his relations with Catherine and Russia.

=== Final years ===
In 1795, the year of the third and final partition of Poland, Littlepage wanted to return to Virginia, bearing a letter of support from King Poniatowski to George Washington. However, he was forced by scarce resources to remain in Europe. During these years, he was nevertheless able to render financial assistance to the distressed Princess Gagarin and Adrienne de Lafayette. According to his own account, Littlepage wanted to accompany Poniatowski to Grodno even into house arrest. He was prevented from doing so by order of the Russian Empress Catherine II. After Catherine's death in late 1796, Paul I forced Stanislas to Petersburg, forever away from Poland. His death occurred in 1798 causing overwhelming grief for Littlepage.

The Emperor Paul I reversed many of Catherine's decisions, probably resulting in Littlepage being promised his backpay in about 1800. Finally, in 1801, he was able to return to America. Since 1786 Littlepage had often corresponded with Thomas Jefferson concerning occurrences and perceptions in Europe. On his return, he went directly to the Federal City to meet with President Jefferson. Thereafter he took up residence back in Virginia. Before a year had passed Lewis Littlepage died in Fredericksburg, Virginia on 19 July 1802.

== Legacy ==
=== Littlepage Collection ===
Twenty items of clothing owned by Littlepage survived in the collection of The Valentine Museum in Richmond, Virginia, who were gifted the clothes in 1952 by dependents of Littlepage's stepbrother, Waller Holladay. The Littlepage Collection was part of nearly 330 historic clothing and textile items donated to The Colonial Williamsburg Foundation by The Valentine in 2023. The collection is believed to include garments that were created or purchased in Poland during Littlepage's political appointments there. It is now the largest collection of clothing owned by a single known person to exist in The Colonial Williamsburg Foundation and includes several richly embroidered suits, waistcoats, sashes, and medals.
