= Mark Trafton =

American politician

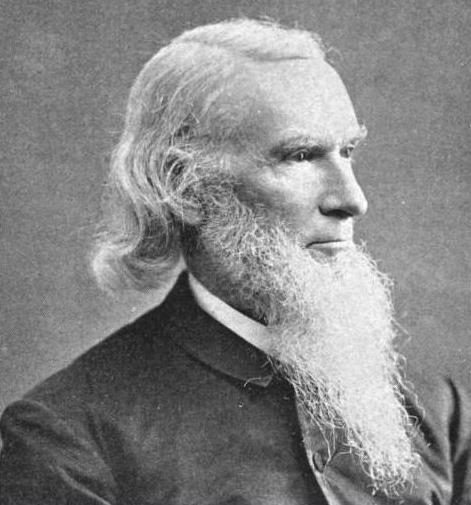

Member of the U.S. House of Representatives from Massachusetts's 11th district
- In office March 4, 1855 – March 3, 1857
- Preceded by: John Z. Goodrich
- Succeeded by: Henry L. Dawes

Personal details
- Born: August 1, 1810 Bangor, Massachusetts (now Maine)
- Died: March 8, 1901 (aged 90) West Somerville, Massachusetts
- Resting place: Peabody Cemetery, Springfield, Massachusetts
- Party: American Party
- Spouse: Eliza Young
- Children: John Trafton; Adeline Trafton; James Trafton
- Occupation: Shoemaker
- Profession: Methodist Episcopal pastor

Mark Trafton (August 1, 1810 – March 8, 1901) was a Methodist Episcopal minister who, as a member of the American Party served one term as a U.S. representative from Massachusetts.

== Family history ==
Trafton's mother Margaret Dennett, was the daughter of Jacob Dennett, one of Bangor, Maine's original settlers.

== Early life ==
Trafton was born in Bangor (then in Massachusetts' District of Maine) to Theodore and Margaret (Dennett) Trafton. When he was fifteen years old he was apprenticed to a Mr. Weed, a shoemaker of Bangor, Maine.

== Education ==
Trafton studied at Kent's Hill Seminary, and was ordained pastor of the Methodist Episcopal church in Westfield, Massachusetts. In the early 1850s he traveled in Europe and published his letters home as Rambles in Europe: In a Series of Familiar Letters (Boston, 1852). The volume is dedicated to George W. Pickering, a cousin and prominent merchant in Bangor, Maine, who may have financed the trip. Trafton never lost touch with his home town of Bangor, returning to speak at its centennial celebration in 1869.

== Family life ==
In 1836 Trafton married Eliza Young of East Pittston, Maine. The Traftons had six children including sons John and James Trafton, and daughter, writer Adeline Trafton. Eliza Trafton died in 1882.

== Member of Congress ==
Trafton was elected as the candidate of the American Party (aka the Know-Nothing Party) to the Thirty-fourth Congress (March 4, 1855 – March 3, 1857). All eleven U.S. Representatives in the Massachusetts delegation were members of the American Party, including Speaker of the House Nathaniel P. Banks. According to his New York Times obituary, Trafton "had been an active leader in the anti-slavery reform, and while a member of Congress he secured the cordial hate of his opponents by his bold assaults upon the slave power". He was an unsuccessful candidate for reelection in 1856 to the Thirty-fifth Congress, and resumed his ministerial duties as pastor of a church in Mount Wollaston, Massachusetts.

== Career as a Clergyman ==
Trafton served as the pastor of the Trinity Methodist Episcopal Church in Charlestown. Trafton served as pastor for the North Russell St. M. E. church in Boston in 1850 and 1851. The ladies of the church presented he and his wife with a red and white signature quilt upon his leaving his tenure there. The quilt now resides at the International Quilt Museum, in Lincoln, Nebraska.

== Death and burial ==
Trafton died in West Somerville, Massachusetts, March 8, 1901. He was interred in Peabody Cemetery, in Springfield.

== Notes ==
U.S. House of Representatives
Preceded by John Z. Goodrich	Member of the U.S. House of Representatives from Massachusetts's 11th congressional district March 4, 1855 – March 3, 1857	Succeeded by Henry L. Dawes
