= 1852 United States presidential election in Georgia =

- November 2, 1852

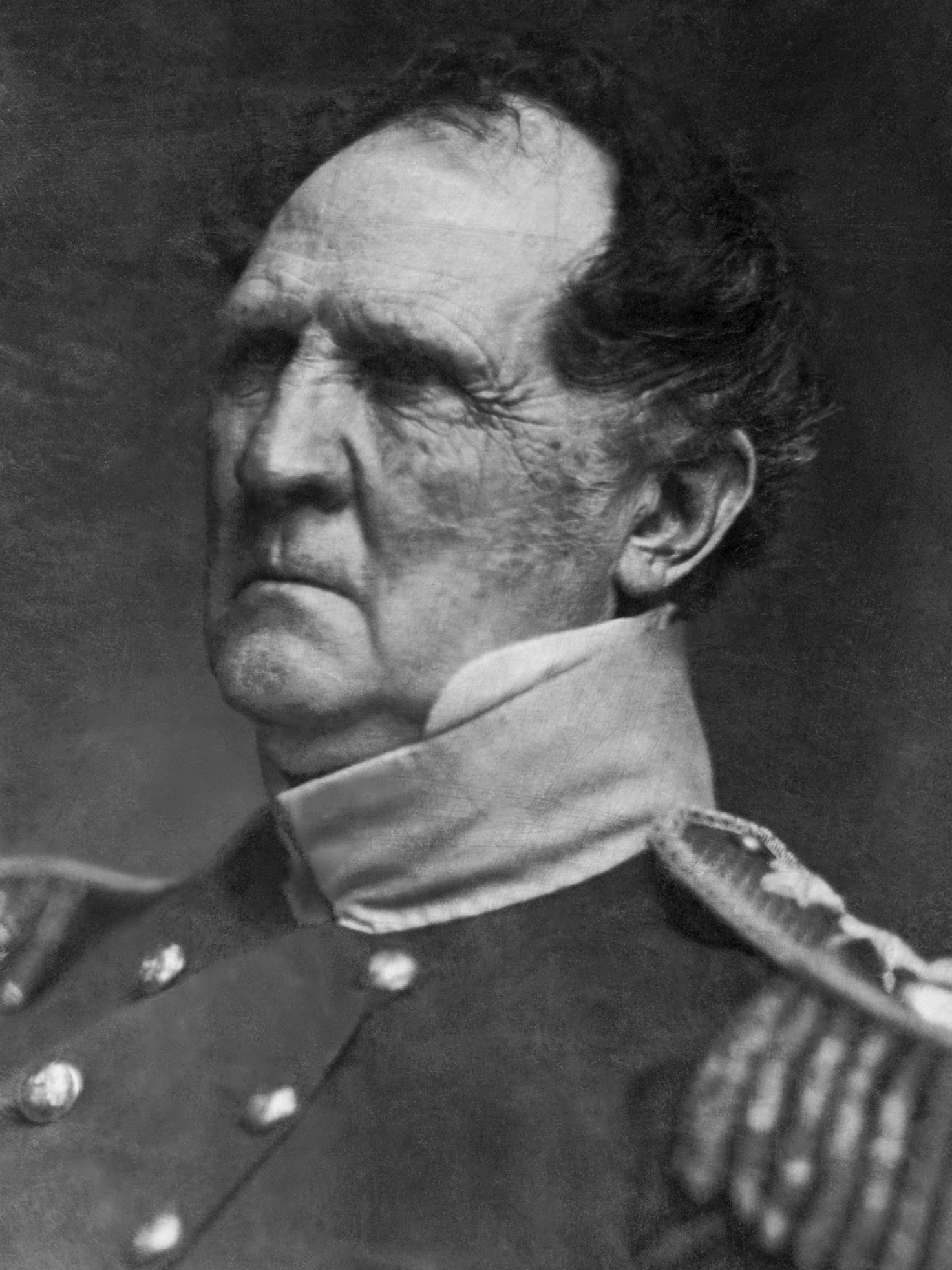

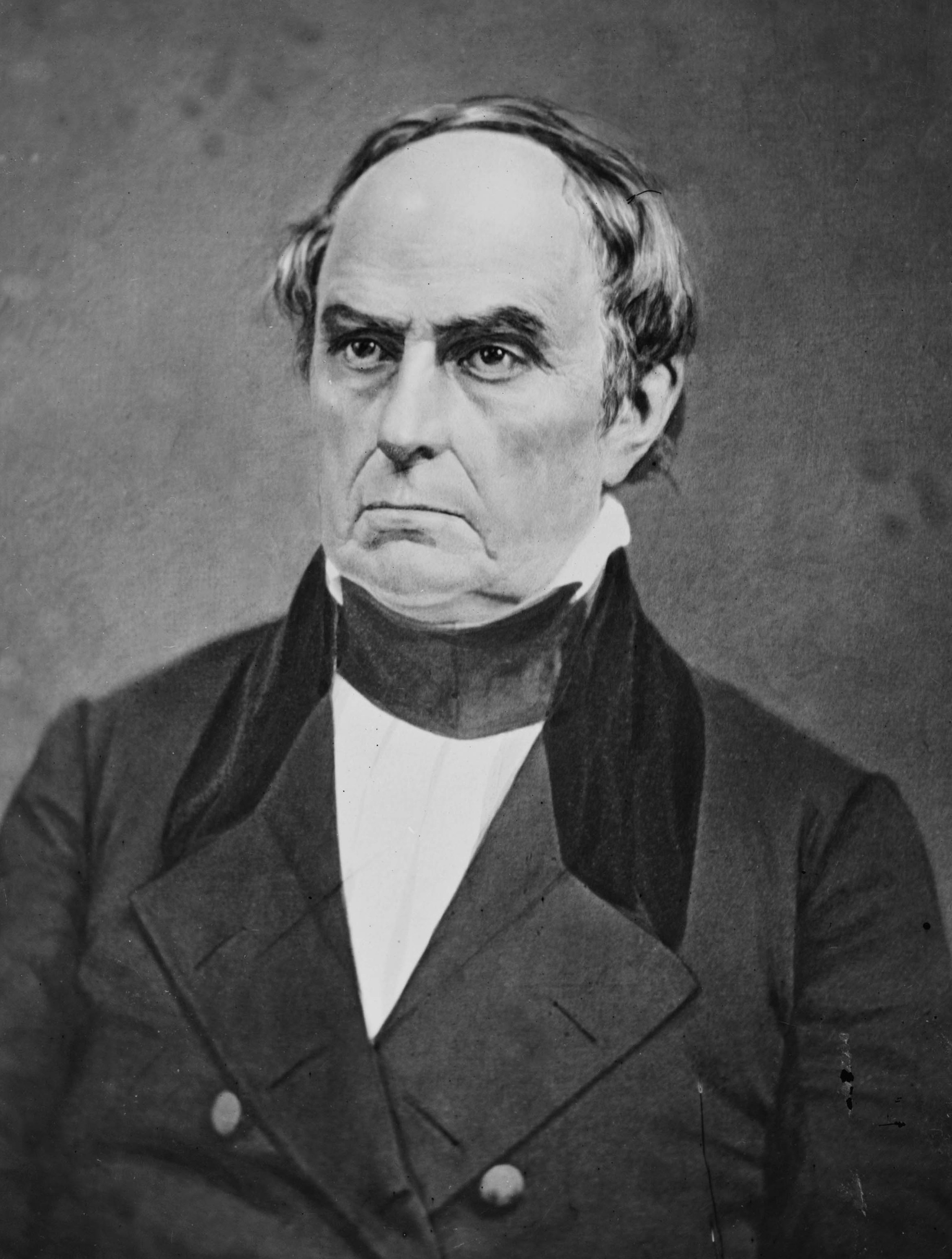
Nominee	Franklin Pierce	Winfield Scott
Party	Southern Rights	Scott Whigs
Alliance	Democratic	Whig
Home state	New Hampshire	New Jersey
Running mate	William R. King	William Alexander Graham
Electoral vote	10	0
Popular vote	34,708	16,639
Percentage	55.56%	26.63%
Nominee	Franklin Pierce	Daniel Webster † (Died October 24, 1852)
Party	Union Democrats	Union Whigs
Alliance	Democratic	Independent Whig
Home state	New Hampshire	Massachusetts
Running mate	William R. King	Charles J. Jenkins
Electoral vote	0	0
Popular vote	5,804	5,321
Percentage	9.29%	8.52%
County results
Pierce (SR)
30–40%
40–50%
50–60%
60–70%
70–80%
80–90%
90–100%
Scott
40–50%
50–60%
60–70%
Pierce (UD)
30–40%
40–50%
50–60%
60–70%
70–80%
Webster
40–50%
50–60%
60–70%
70–80%
President before election
Millard Fillmore
Whig
Elected President
Franklin Pierce
Democratic

The 1852 United States presidential election in Georgia took place on November 2, 1852, as part of the 1852 United States presidential election. Voters chose 10 representatives, or electors to the Electoral College, who voted for President and Vice President.

Georgia party leaders had formed a Unionist coalition in response to what they saw as potential threats to the South, forming a majority of delegates sent to a convention called in response to the admission of California. At the convention, they issued the Georgia Platform, stating that while they supported the Compromise of 1850, it was the "final solution." Opposing them was the anti-Union "Resistance".

In the aftermath of this convention, the coalition formed the Constitutional Union Party, while the resistance became the Southern Rights Party of Georgia. The former party was divided between former Democrat and former Whig factions, even sending delegates to their previous national affiliation's conventions. The Southern Rights Party also sent delegates to the Democratic convention with a slate of secessionists, though they ultimately supported the Pierce ticket.

When the next Constitutional Union convention nominated Pierce, anti-Pierce/anti-Scott Whigs walked out of the convention. These dissenting Whigs hoped to nominate Daniel Webster and throw the election into the House of Representatives, which they proceeded to do at a convention in Macon without permission from Webster. Webster died of natural causes shortly before the election. Simultaneously, pro-Winfield Scott Whigs nominated their preferred candidate at a separate convention in Macon. After these conventions, the Democratic majority of the Constitutional Union Party dissolved the party. Democrats who did not wish to vote for a Southern Rights Party-sponsored ticket fielded their own Pierce ticket.

In the end, the Southern Rights-Democrat ticket swept the other three competing tickets, showing that while the "majority of voters in Georgia accepted the Compromise of 1850 as a settlement of past difficulties," according to historian Murray, "they would demand more specific recognition of "Southern Rights" as a basis for future action."

== Background ==
By 1849 both parties had come to see the possibility of the passage of the Wilmot Proviso, the admission of California, the abolition of slavery in the District of Columbia, or the refusal of Northern states to deliver up fugitive slaves as threats to the South, with the general assembly passing a bill mandating the governor to call a state convention if any of these events occurred. Meanwhile, in Congress, Georgia Whig leaders Alexander H. Stephens and Robert Toombs divorced from their national party and entered into negotiations with Speaker Howell Cobb, a Democrat, to form a coalition supporting compromise measures aimed at preserving the Union.

In Georgia, political leaders, beginning in Macon, started a movement to unify the state parties to preserve the union, which rapidly spread across the state. Prominent Democrats such as Herschel V. Johnson, a few old SRP Whigs, and Fire-Eaters William Lowndes Yancey of Alabama and Robert Barnwell of South Carolina, also met in Macon, forming the Anti-Union or "Resistance" group.

Thus, by the time Governor George W. Towns called a state convention in response to the admission of California, party lines had already fractured and reorganized. In the ensuing election of delegates to the convention, acting as a referendum for the Compromise of 1850, Unionists outnumbered the resistance nine to one. At the convention, Unionists issued the Georgia Platform, which affirmed support for the Compromise of 1850 but warned that it was the "final solution" to the issue of slavery's expansion. In three evening caucuses held from December 11-13, Whigs and Democrats formalized their coalition by creating a new party: the Constitutional Union Party.

At its first convention in June 1851, while agreeing to replace Senator Berrin, who drifted into the resistance, with former Whig Toombs, the governor nomination was given to former Democrat Cobb, and the executive committee of the new party of made up of mostly former Democrats. With their new majority in the general assembly, the Constitutional Union Party split spoils as agreed but the party was divided between "Union Democrats" and "Union Whigs." Each faction sent delegates to their respective national party conventions for 1852. The resistance party changed its name to the Southern Rights Party and sent delegates to the Democratic convention with an electoral ticket of secessionists.

In the following Constitutional Union convention, the dominant Democrats nominated Franklin Pierce, causing anti-Pierce/anti-Scott Whigs to walk out of the convention. These dissenting Whigs hoped to nominate Daniel Webster and throw the election into the House of Representatives, which they proceeded to do at a convention in Macon without permission from Webster. Webster died of natural causes shortly before the election. Simultaneously, pro-Winfield Scott Whigs nominated their preferred candidate at a separate convention in Macon. Following these conventions, the Democratic majority on the Constitutional Union Party's executive committee declared the party dissolved. Union Democrats who refused to support the Southern Rights Party-sponsored Pierce ticket fielded their own Pierce ticket.

== Results and aftermath ==
In the end, the Southern Rights-Democrat ticket won the 1852 election over the other three competing tickets, showing that while the "majority of voters in Georgia accepted the Compromise of 1850 as a settlement of past difficulties," according to historian Murray, "they would demand more specific recognition of "Southern Rights" as a basis for future action." In the aftermath, the Southern Rights Party of Georgia was absorbed into the national Democratic Party, dropping its former title and uniting with the other Democratic faction.

Georgia Whigs leaders refused to align themselves with the national party again, with state Whig leader Toombs stating "if the Whig is incapable of rising to the same standard of notoriety as the motley crew, which offers peace under the name of the Democracy, it is entitled to no resurrection [and] it will have none!" Instead, despite warnings from Cobb it was impossible, they reorganized the Constitutional Union Party, nominating Jenkins for the 1853 gubernatorial election. Not all pro-Scott Whigs followed into this party.

1852 United States presidential election in Georgia
Party	Candidate	Running mate	Popular vote		Electoral vote	
Party	Candidate	Running mate	Count	%	Count	%
Southern Rights	Franklin Pierce of New Hampshire	William R. King of Alabama	34,708	55.56%	10	100.00%
Whig	Winfield Scott of New Jersey	William Alexander Graham of North Carolina	16,639	26.63%	0	0.00%
Union Democrats	Franklin Pierce	William R. King	5,804	9.29%	0	0.00%
Union	Daniel Webster of Massachusetts	Charles J. Jenkins of Georgia	5,321	8.52%	0	0.00%
Total			62,626	100.00%	10	100.00%

== See also ==
- United States presidential elections in Georgia
