= 1851 Georgia gubernatorial election =

- October 6, 1851
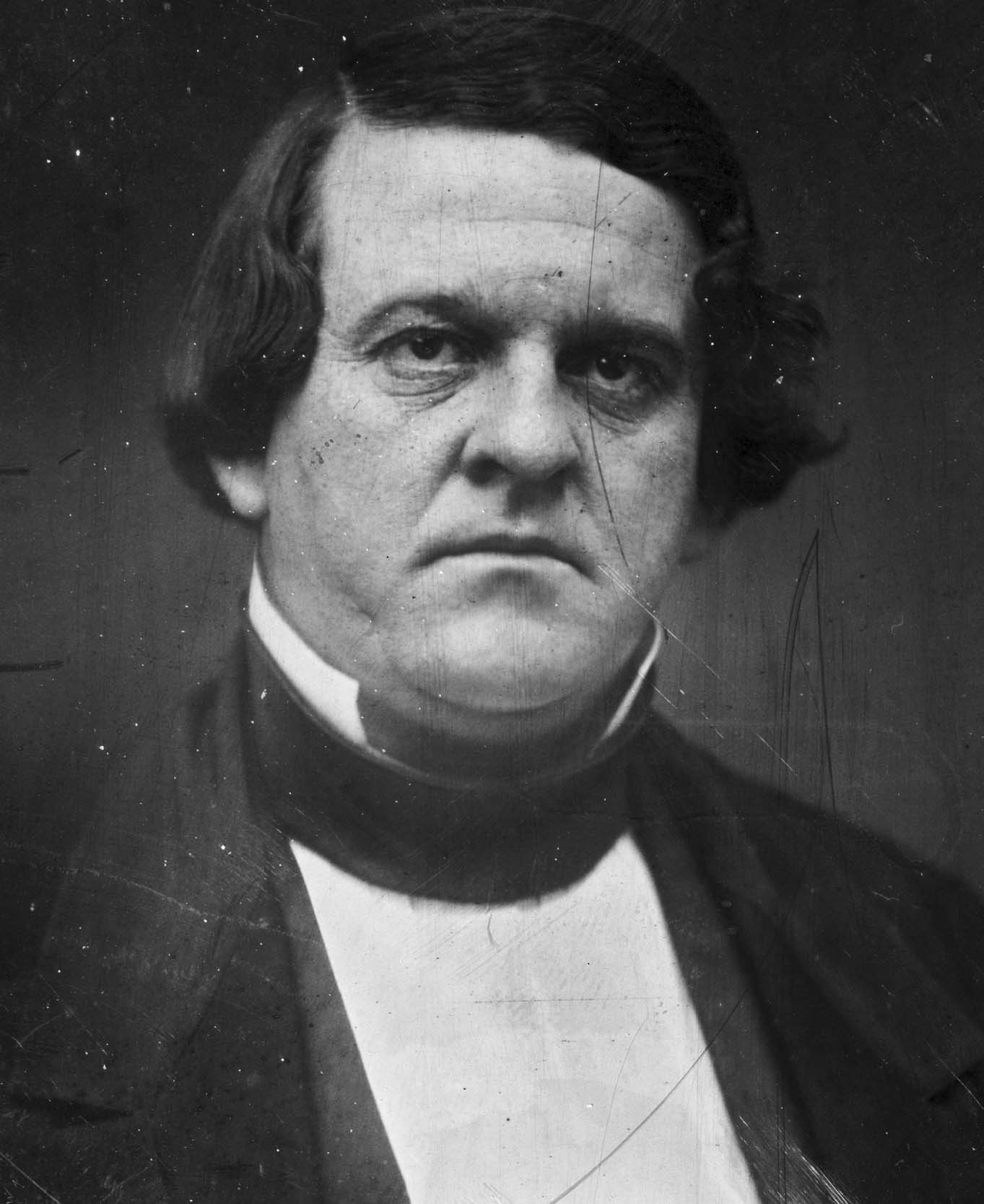

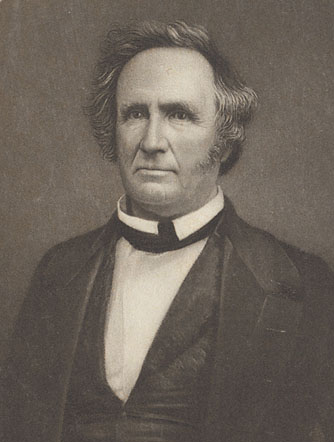
Nominee	Howell Cobb	Charles McDonald
Party	Constitutional Union	Resistance
Popular vote	57,417	38,824
Percentage	59.66%	40.34%
- Results by County; Cobb: 50–60% 60–70% 70–80% 80–90% McDonald: 50–60% 60–70% 70–80% 80–90%
Governor before election
George W. Towns
Democratic
Elected Governor
Howell Cobb
Constitutional Union Party

The 1851 Georgia gubernatorial election was held on October 6, 1851, to elect the governor of Georgia. Howell Cobb, nominee for the newly formed Constitutional Union Party, defeated the Resistance candidate, Charles McDonald.

== Background ==
=== Old local party system ===
Until 1840 Georgian politics were dominated by two local parties, the Union Party and the State Rights Party. The Union party was the product of the forces of liberal democracy that brought white manhood suffrage and popular elections in the 1800s. The State Rights Party, on the other hand, was the successor to the Troup Party, a political anomaly whose conservative politics and organization were more closely related to those of the late 1800s.

After the 1836 presidential election the Union and State Rights parties slowly began to merge with the Democratic and Whig parties respectively. By the 1840 presidential election, the national Whig and Democratic parties had crystallized in Georgia, creating a strong two-party system that would last in the state for the next decade and a half.

=== Mexican-American War ===
The Mexican-American War greatly intensified the national debate over slavery and created disruptions within the previously stable party lines. This rift occurred at the General Assembly of 1847 over the issue of the Wilmot Proviso. The Whigs presented resolutions denying that Congress had the power to restrict slavery in the territories. The Democrats were opposed to this and argued for an endorsement of the war and seizer of Mexican land. The debate dragged on for awhile as each side attempted to get the other to contradict the aims of their respective national party.

In the 1848 presidential election, Georgia Whigs endorsed the unpopular Zachary Taylor for president. Many Whigs revolted against the decision of the party, denouncing Taylor and criticizing Alexander Stephens for not supporting the Clayton Compromise. The only thing that saved the Whigs from breaking up entirely was when Stephens was gravely injured by a knife-wielding man twice his size. Ultimately, Taylor won the Georgia vote but only thanks to Democratic dissidents who found Democratic nominee Lewis Cass as the least satisfactory on the issue of slavery. However, the divisions within the Whig party would cost them more than they could handle.

=== Compromise of 1850 ===
The state of Georgia was once again absorbed into sectional debates during 1849 and 1850 that resulted in the Compromise of 1850. Both sides had come to see the Wilmot Proviso, admission of California, abolishment of slavery in Washington DC, and refusal of the North to follow the fugitive slave act as a threat to the South. The democrats passed an act forcing the governor to call a state convention to meet in the event of any of these. The Whigs were opposed to this as state convention would most likely make them the minority.

Around the same time, Alexander Stephens and Robert Toombs, leading members of the Georgia Whigs, had departed its ranks and entered into negotiations with Speaker Howell Cobb and other Democratic members to support compromise measures. Many political leaders discussed the need for a compromise spirt to preserve the union and save the South from "the miserable free soil policy of General Taylor." A movement to create a Union of the parties began at Macon and rapidly spread throughout the state. Not to be confused with the later Constitutional Union Party, the Georgia Constitutional Union Party was a short-lived merger of Unionists Democrats and Whigs who supported the Compromise of 1850.

An anti-Compromise or "Resistance" group, also originating from Macon, led by prominent Democrats, old State Rights Whigs, and fire-eaters was formed.

=== Georgia Platform ===
In response to the admission of California as a state and his mistaken belief that white Georgians supported the radical cause, Governor Towns scheduled elections for a December 1850 state convention in the hopes of launching the state toward secession. The resulting vote was essentially a referendum on the Compromise of 1850 and saw the pro-Unionists win with a nine-to-one majority.

In three caucuses from December 11–13, the Democratic and Whig state parties merged into the Constitutional Union Party.

== General election ==
=== Results ===
1851 Georgia gubernatorial election
Party	Candidate	Votes	%	±%
Constitutional Union	Howell Cobb	57,417	59.66%	
Resistance	Charles McDonald	40,824	40.34%	
Total votes		98,241	100.00	
