= Historical composition of the United States House of Representatives =

This chart shows the historical composition of the United States House of Representatives, from the 1st Congress to the present day.

United States House of Representatives, 1789 to present

AA / DR / Dem. / Soc. / Anti-Mas. / Null. / SR / Ind. / Opp. / Un. / LO / Cons. / PA / Fed. / Lab. / GB / Pop. / Prg. '12 / Prg. '24 / FL / FS / Sil. / S.Rep. / NR / Whig / Anti-Neb. / LR / Readj. / NU / Rep. / Peo. / KN / RU / Proh.			Total
1st	1788	28 / 37	65
2nd	1790	30 / 39	67
3rd	1792	54 / 51	105
4th	1794	59 / 47	106
5th	1796	49 / 57	106
6th	1798	46 / 60	106
7th	1800	68 / 38	106
8th	1802	102 / 40	142
9th	1804	114 / 28	142
10th	1806	116 / 26	142
11th	1808	94 / 48	142
12th	1810	106 / 36	142
13th	1812	114 / 68	182
14th	1814	118 / 64	182
15th	1816	144 / 40	184
16th	1818	158 / 28	186
17th	1820	155 / 32	187
18th	1822	189 / 24	213
19th	1824	104 / 108	213
20th	1826	113 / 100	213
21st	1828	136 / 5 / 72	213
22nd	1830	4 / 126 / 17 / 66	213
23rd	1832	9 / 143 / 25 / 63	240
24th	1834	8 / 142 / 16 / 75	241
25th	1836	6 / 128 / 1 / 7 / 100	242
26th	1838	125 / 2 / 6 / 109	242
27th	1840	99 / 2 / 142	242
28th	1842	148 / 2 / 2 / 73	223
29th	1844	142 / 79 / 6	224
30th	1846	110 / 1 / 116 / 1	228
31st	1848	113 / 1 / 9 / 108 / 1	233
32nd	1850	3 / 127 / 10 / 4 / 4 / 85	233
33rd	1852	4 / 150 / 5 / 3 / 4 / 68	234
34th	1854	83 / 1 / 1 / 54 / 22 / 13 / 9 / 51	234
35th	1856	132 / 1 / 90 / 14	237
36th	1858	83 / 1 / 19 / 113 / 9	238
37th	1860	1 / 44 / 1 / 31 / 106	183
38th	1862	72 / 25 / 87	184
39th	1864	5 / 33 / 1 / 150 / 4	193
40th	1866	2 / 47 / 2 / 173	224
41st	1868	5 / 67 / 171	243
42nd	1870	10 / 94 / 1 / 2 / 136	243
43rd	1872	4 / 84 / 1 / 4 / 199	292
44th	1874	182 / 8 / 103	292
45th	1876	155 / 2 / 136	293
46th	1878	141 / 13 / 7 / 132	293
47th	1880	128 / 10 / 2 / 2 / 151	293
48th	1882	196 / 2 / 6 / 4 / 117	325
49th	1884	182 / 1 / 1 / 141	325
50th	1886	167 / 1 / 2 / 3 / 152	325
51st	1888	152 / 1 / 179	332
52nd	1890	238 / 8 / 86	332
53rd	1892	218 / 11 / 2 / 1 / 124	356
54th	1894	93 / 9 / 1 / 253	356
55th	1896	124 / 22 / 1 / 1 / 3 / 206	357
56th	1898	161 / 5 / 1 / 1 / 2 / 187	357
57th	1900	151 / 5 / 1 / 200	357
58th	1902	176 / 4 / 206	386
59th	1904	135 / 251	386
60th	1906	167 / 1 / 223	391
61st	1908	172 / 219	391
62nd	1910	1 / 227 / 2 / 161	391
63rd	1912	291 / 2 / 10 / 134	435
64th	1914	1 / 230 / 1 / 6 / 196 / 1	435
65th	1916	1 / 214 / 1 / 3 / 215 / 1	435
66th	1918	1 / 1 / 192 / 240 / 1	435
67th	1920	1 / 131 / 1 / 303	435
68th	1922	1 / 2 / 207 / 225	435
69th	1924	2 / 3 / 183 / 1 / 246	435
70th	1926	1 / 2 / 194 / 238	435
71st	1928	1 / 164 / 270	435
72nd	1930	1 / 216 / 218	435
73rd	1932	5 / 313 / 117	435
74th	1934	7 / 3 / 322 / 103	435
75th	1936	8 / 5 / 334 / 88	435
76th	1938	1 / 2 / 1 / 262 / 169	435
77th	1940	1 / 3 / 1 / 267 / 1 / 162	435
78th	1942	1 / 2 / 1 / 222 / 209	435
79th	1944	1 / 1 / 244 / 189	435
80th	1946	1 / 188 / 246	435
81st	1948	1 / 263 / 171	435
82nd	1950	235 / 1 / 199	435
83rd	1952	213 / 1 / 221	435
84th	1954	232 / 203	435
85th	1956	234 / 201	435
86th	1958	283 / 153	436
87th	1960	262 / 175	437
88th	1962	259 / 176	435
89th	1964	295 / 140	435
90th	1966	248 / 187	435
91st	1968	243 / 192	435
92nd	1970	255 / 180	435
93rd	1972	242 / 1 / 192	435
94th	1974	291 / 144	435
95th	1976	292 / 143	435
96th	1978	277 / 157 / 1	435
97th	1980	242 / 1 / 191 / 1	435
98th	1982	269 / 165 / 1	435
99th	1984	253 / 181 / 1	435
100th	1986	258 / 177	435
101st	1988	260 / 175	435
102nd	1990	267 / 1 / 167	435
103rd	1992	258 / 1 / 176	435
104th	1994	204 / 1 / 230	435
105th	1996	207 / 2 / 226	435
106th	1998	211 / 1 / 223	435
107th	2000	212 / 2 / 221	435
108th	2002	205 / 1 / 229	435
109th	2004	202 / 1 / 232	435
110th	2006	233 / 202	435
111th	2008	257 / 178	435
112th	2010	193 / 242	435
113th	2012	201 / 234	435
114th	2014	188 / 247	435
115th	2016	194 / 241	435
116th	2018	235 / 199	435
117th	2020	222 / 213	435
118th	2022	213 / 222	435
119th	2024	215 / 220	435
