= 1853 Georgia gubernatorial election =

- October 3, 1853
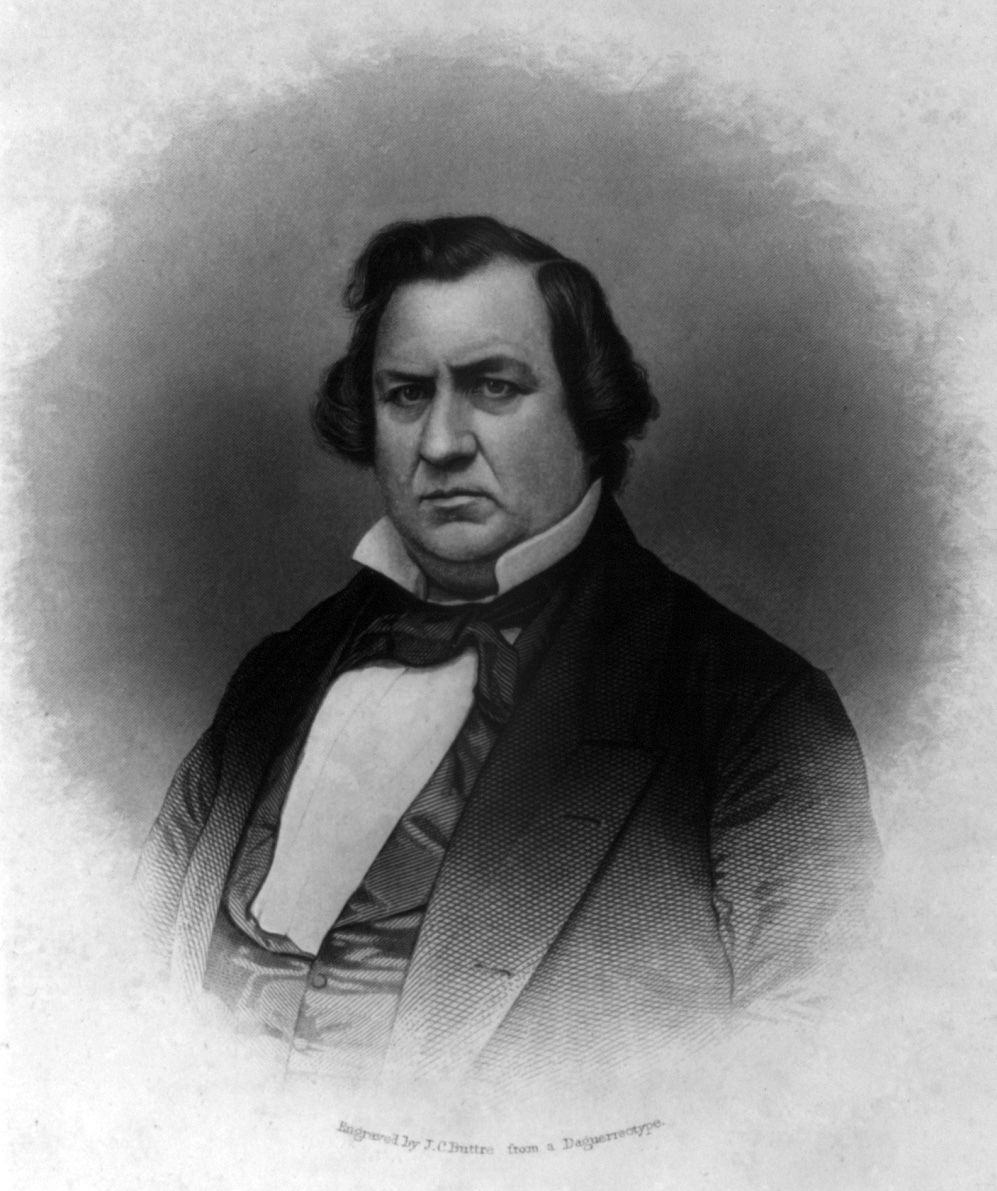

Nominee	Herschel V. Johnson	Charles J. Jenkins
Party	Democratic	Constitutional Union
Popular vote	47,638	47,128
Percentage	50.27%	49.73%
- Results by County; Johnson: 50–60% 60–70% 70–80% 80–90% >90% Jenkins: 50–60% 60–70% 70–80% 80–90% >90%
Governor before election
Howell Cobb
Union
Elected Governor
Herschel V. Johnson
Democratic

The 1853 Georgia gubernatorial election was held on October 3, 1853, in order to elect the Governor of Georgia. Democratic nominee and former United States Senator from Georgia Herschel V. Johnson defeated Constitutional Union nominee and former Attorney General of Georgia Charles J. Jenkins by a slim margin.

== Background ==
In the aftermath of the Compromise of 1850, Union Democrats, led by Howell Cobb, and Georgia Whigs had merged to form the Constitutional Union Party in support of the compromise. This coalition of parties was instrumental in securing Cobb's governorship in 1851.

The results of the 1852 presidential election confirmed Georgian's support for the compromise, but that they would demand more specific recognition of "Southern Rights" basis for the future. In its aftermath, the Southern Rights Party was accepted into the national Democratic Party, causing it to drop the former title. The Democrats nominated Herschel V. Johnson.

Significantly, the party refused to endorse Cobb's administration or his Senate candidacy, departing from the idea of compromise in the sectional conflict. The Union Whigs, left with the option of either merging with the Democrats or attempting to rebuild their party as a state organization, chose the latter, nominating Charles J. Jenkins.

== General election ==
On election day, October 3, 1853, Democratic nominee Herschel V. Johnson won the election by a margin of 510 votes against his opponent Union nominee Charles J. Jenkins, thereby gaining Democrats control over the office of Governor. Johnson was sworn in as the 41st Governor of Georgia on November 9, 1853.

=== Results ===
Georgia gubernatorial election, 1853
Party	Candidate	Votes	%
Democratic	Herschel V. Johnson	47,638	50.27
Constitutional Union	Charles J. Jenkins	47,128	49.73
Total votes		94,766	100.00
Democratic gain from Constitutional Union			
