= Union Party (United States, 1850) =

- Other name: Constitutional Union Party (GA)
- Leaders: Daniel Webster; Howell Cobb; Henry S. Foote; Alexander H. Stephens; Robert Toombs
- Founded: 1850; 176 years ago
- Dissolved: 1853; 173 years ago
- Ideology: Anti-abolitionism; Conditional unionism Pro-Compromise; Proslavery (US)
- House of Representatives: 14 / 233 (1851–53, peak) (Note: Including 2 Union Democrats and 2 Union Whigs from Alabama)
- State governors: 2 / 31 (1852–53, peak)
- State upper chambers: 72 / 900 (1852, peak)
- State lower chambers: 200 / 3,479 (1852, peak)

The Union Party was a proslavery, unionist political party in the United States during the early 1850s. It was one of two main political parties in the slave states of Alabama, Georgia, and Mississippi, alongside the Southern Rights Party. The Georgia affiliate was known as the Constitutional Union Party. The party was organized to support the Compromise of 1850. While some figures such as Daniel Webster predicted a sweeping political realignment in which the Union Party would unite all those in favor of the Compromise measures, no national organization ever emerged. The party disbanded following acceptance of the Compromise by the Southern Rights leaders, with most former Unionists returning to their previous partisan allegiances.

Events following the Mexican–American War fueled rising tensions between the free and slave states, as proslavery fire-eaters threatened secession in response to the Wilmot Proviso. The crisis fractured the existing party system and produced an alliance between unionist Democrats and Whigs in the Deep South who sought to avert a civil war and defeat their intrapartisan rivals. Unionists were especially active in the 1851 elections, when Union parties elected 14 members to the U.S. House of Representatives and won governorships in Georgia and Mississippi. The acquiescence of the Southern Rights leaders to the Compromise after 1851 removed the need for a dedicated Union Party, leading to the disintegration of state Union parties. During the 1852 United States presidential election in Georgia, Union Whigs backed Webster's independent candidacy, while Union Democrats cross-endorsed the national Democratic ticket.

In states where Union parties were organized, Unionists supported preservation of the federal Union and opposed an independent Southern Confederacy. Ardently proslavery, they rejected secession as unconstitutional and ruinous to the interests of the slave states. Instead, they advocated a policy of conditional unionism wherein the slave states would remain loyal to the national government so long as the free states agreed to abide by the Compromise and abstain from any future attacks on slavery. While they opposed immediate secession, Unionists did not rule it out in the future should Southern demands go unheeded. Many who had been Unionists in the 1850s would go on to serve in the Confederate government during the Civil War, including Alexander H. Stephens, who served as vice president of the Confederacy from 1861 to 1865.

== Background ==
=== Compromise of 1850 ===
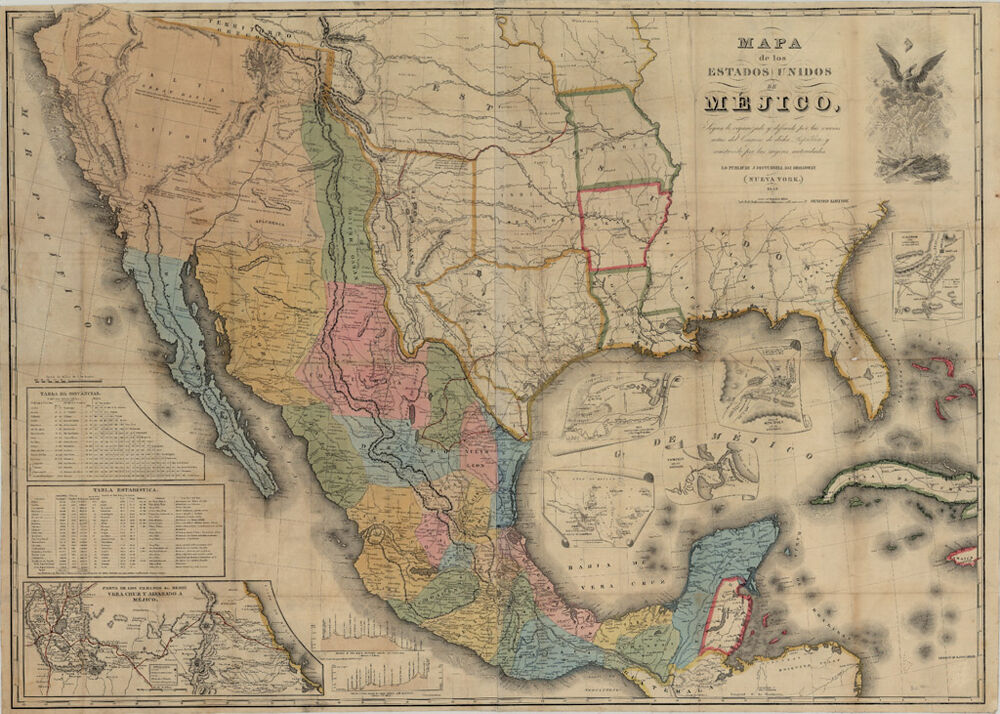
Mapa de los Estados Unidos de Méjico (1847) showing territories ceded to the United States in the Treaty of Guadalupe Hidalgo.

The Treaty of Guadalupe Hidalgo gained the provinces of Alta California and Nuevo México for the United States and opened the question of slavery's extension into the territory. Prior to ratification, Pennsylvania representative David Wilmot introduced an amendment providing as a "fundamental condition" of annexation that "neither slavery nor involuntary servitude shall exist in any part" of the Mexican Cession. The so-called Wilmot Proviso passed the House of Representatives but stalled in the Senate, where it became a serious point of contention between the free and slave states. The Proviso was a major issue in the 1848 United States presidential election, resulting in a split between the anti-extensionist Barnburner Democrats and the dominant faction of the Democratic Party, which advocated popular sovereignty. The Barnburners joined antislavery Conscience Whigs and abolitionists in the Free Soil Party, which polled 14 percent of the votes in the free states. The breach in the Democratic ranks allowed the Whig candidate, major general Zachary Taylor, to carry the critical state of New York and win the election while maintaining a noncommittal position on the territorial question.

Taylor planned to finesse the Proviso by granting immediate statehood to California and New Mexico, thus bypassing the territorial stage and avoiding the need for the national government to assume responsibility for slavery's exclusion from or expansion into the Southwest, but died before Congress could come to any determination. A compromise package introduced by the Kentucky senator Henry Clay was defeated by the combined votes of Northern free-soilers and Southern fire-eaters. Following weeks of deadlock, the Compromise was shepherded through Congress item-by-item, with border state Whigs joining the Northern members to admit California as a free state, abolish the slave trade in the District of Columbia, and settle the boundary dispute between Texas and New Mexico, while Northern Democrats joined the Southern members to pass the Fugitive Slave Act of 1850 and organize the Utah and New Mexico territories without restrictions on slavery. Taylor's successor as president, Millard Fillmore, declared the Compromise measures a "final settlement" of sectional issues and committed U.S. soldiers to enforce the Fugitive Slave Act.

Clay's original omnibus proposal consisted of eight planks, subsequently enacted as individual items.

1. Admission of California as a free state;
2. Organization of the Utah and New Mexico territories without restrictions on slavery;
3. Settlement of the Texas-New Mexico boundary dispute in favor of New Mexico;
4. U.S. assumption of debts contracted by the Republic of Texas prior to annexation;
5. Abolition of the slave trade in the District of Columbia;
6. Protection of slavery in the District of Columbia;
7. Strengthened U.S. enforcement of the Fugitive Slave Clause;
8. Denial of U.S. authority to regulate the interstate slave trade.

=== Whig Party ===
The United States Senate, A.D. 1850 (c. 1855) by Peter F. Rothermel. Whig Party founders Daniel Webster and Henry Clay appear in this depiction of the introduction of the Compromise of 1850 in the Old Senate Chamber.

The Whig Party was a conservative political party in the United States during the mid-nineteenth century. It was the main opposition to the Democratic Party from 1834 until 1854. Following the party's unexpected defeat in the 1844 United States presidential election, some voices within the party called for a political realignment in which Whigs would join dissident Democrats in a new party. Taylor's nomination and election were seen as a step in this direction, in light of the general's perceived popularity with nativists, Democrats, and independent voters. The allocation of patronage in the new administration was indeed intended to build up a new "Taylor party" that would supplant the Whigs as the major opposition to the Democrats. Catastrophic Whigs losses in state and congressional elections held in the fall of 1849 put an end to the Taylor movement but not to discussion of a possible realignment among Whigs of various stripes.

Following his inauguration, Fillmore wrote to Hamilton Fish that he intended "to save the country [and] to save the Whig party, if possible." The president's strenuous support for the Compromise measures exacerbated divisions among Northern Whigs, however; intensified intraparty conflict led some pro-Compromise Whigs to conclude with Webster that "a new arrangement of Parties is unavoidable." During the winter of 1850–51, they increasingly looked to an alliance with pro-Compromise Democrats and "the creation of a great National Union Party" in answer to the problems presented by the sectional crisis.

== History ==
=== Union Party movement, 1850–51 ===
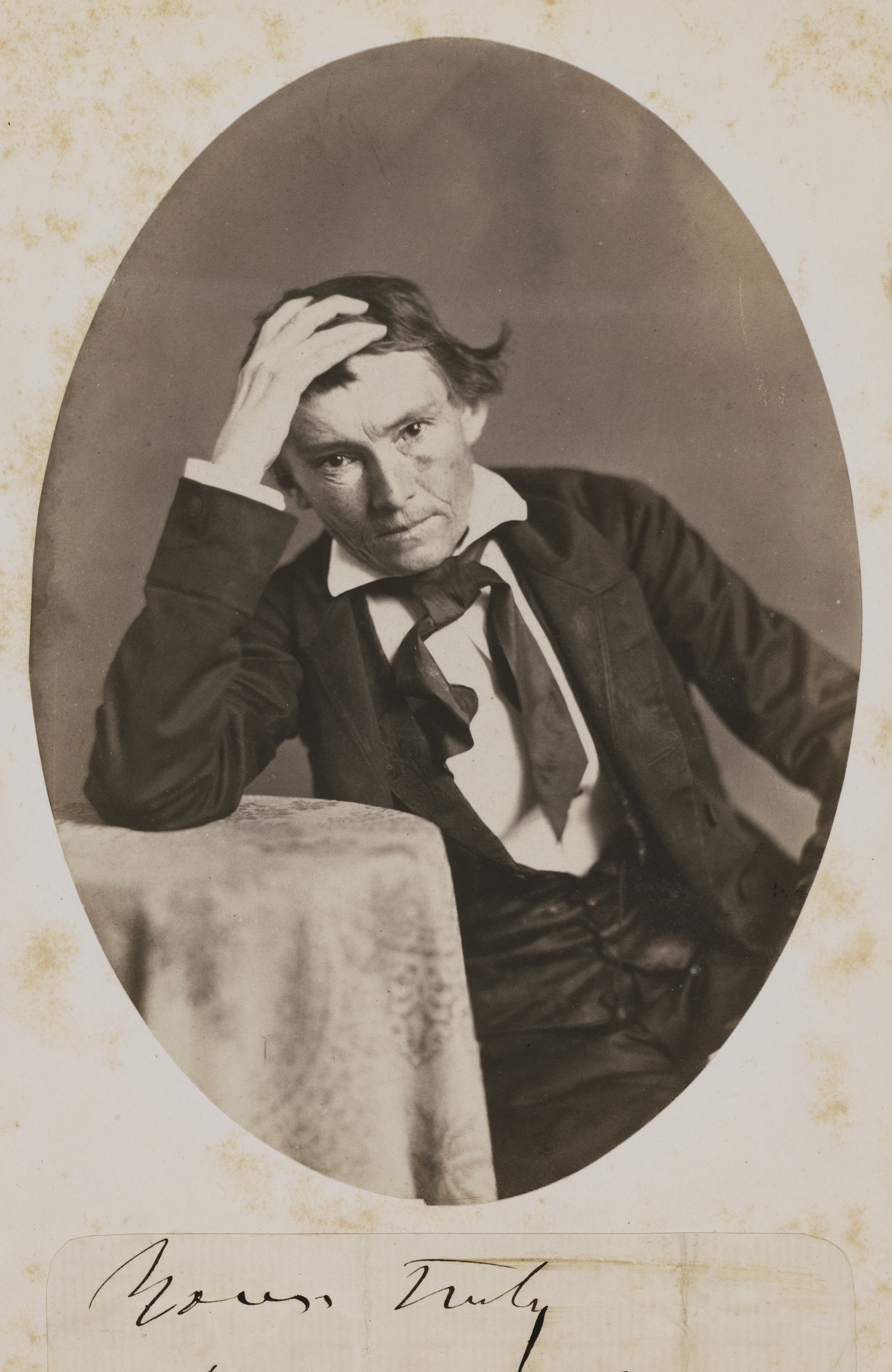
Alexander H. Stephens, leader of the Georgia Constitutional Unionists in Congress

Following the congressional vote on the Compromise, the freshman U.S. senator from Ohio, Salmon P. Chase, wrote that "the question of slavery in the territories has been avoided. It has not been settled." Fillmore's insistence that the measures constituted a "final settlement" of sectional issues masked the reality that a passionate minority of free-soilers and fire-eaters still opposed the Compromise. The ad hoc majority assembled for each of the Compromise measures disguised the fact that most members had voted against any concessions by their section; in both houses, fewer than one-third of the members had supported the omnibus package. Opposition to the Compromise cut across party lines and divided individual state organizations. These circumstances encouraged pro-Compromise politicians in certain states to form bipartisan Union coalitions predicated on unconditional acceptance of the Compromise.

Several prominent pro-Compromise Whigs endorsed the Union Party movement during the fall of 1850, including Clay, Webster, and John P. Kennedy. In contrast, most Democrats denied the need for a new party. Illinois senator Stephen Douglass, who managed the passage of the Compromise measures through the Senate, said, "the Democratic party is as good a Union party as I want." One notable exception was the speaker of the United States House of Representatives, Howell Cobb, a Democrat representing the unionist upcountry of northern Georgia. During the summer of 1850, Cobb's allies joined the majority Whig faction led by Alexander H. Stephens and Robert Toombs in an ad hoc Union coalition that became the basis for the state's Constitutional Union Party. Informed partly by ideology, Stephens and Toombs also hoped to displace the rival Whig faction led by the senior U.S. senator from Georgia, John M. Berrien, who had gravitated toward the Southern Rights orbit.

The new party movement experienced modest success in Massachusetts and New York City, where a Union ticket was circulated during the 1850 New York state election. The strongest performances by the Union Party, however, were in the Deep South. In Alabama and Mississippi, as in Georgia, upcountry Democrats joined most Whigs in Union parties that contested elections held in 1851. In Mississippi, Union U.S. senator Henry S. Foote defeated Southern Rights leader Jefferson Davis in the gubernatorial election; Cobb was elected governor in Georgia, while Unionists won majorities in both chambers of the Alabama Legislature. Fourteen Unionists were elected to the 32nd United States Congress, all from the Deep South. The results of the elections encouraged Unionists like Alabama's Henry W. Hilliard to believe that the Union Party could be a vehicle for their national political ambitions.

Attempts to establish a new national party, however, came to little. When Stephens circulated a round-robin letter in March 1851 as a test of Union Party sentiment in Congress, most Whig and Democratic members declined to leave their old parties. A Union National Convention proposed for February 22 failed to materialize. Webster's efforts to organize the Union Party in the free states failed decisively, resulting in debilitating Whig losses across the Upper North. Meanwhile, Fillmore's pro-Compromise stance, together with strong showings for Southern Whigs in elections held in 1851, diminished demand for a new pro-Compromise party. By coopting the Union platform while emphasizing traditional Whig economic policies, the president hoped to position Whigs to carry the slave states in the 1852 United States elections.

=== Presidential campaign, 1852 ===
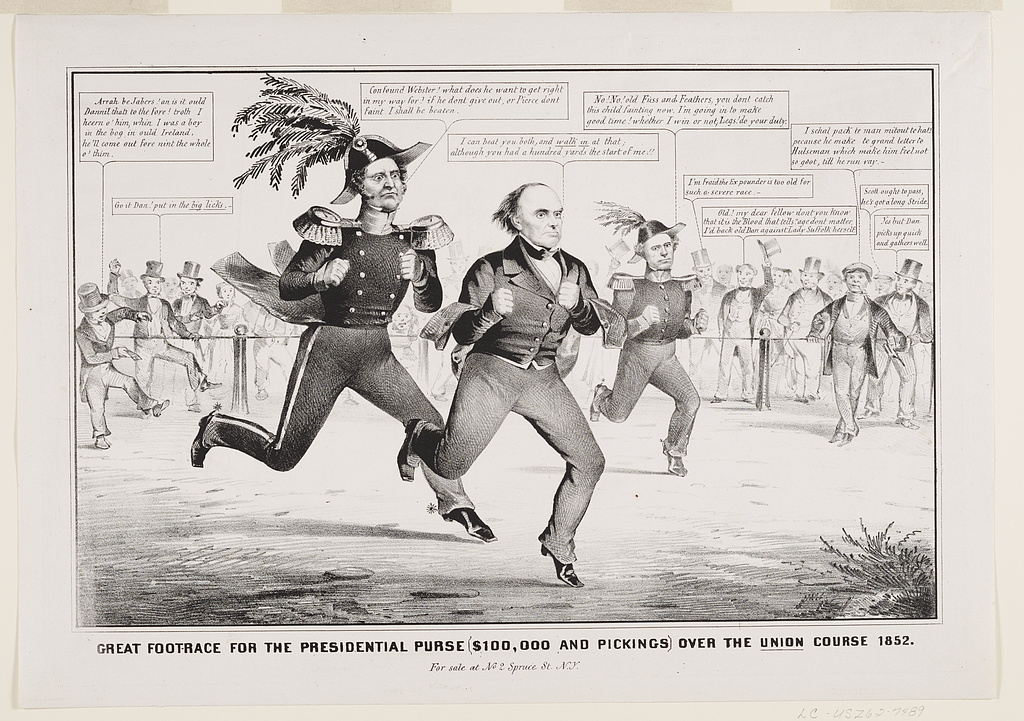
Great Footrace for the Presidential Purse [...] (1852). Union candidate Daniel Webster (center) races ahead of Whig Winfield Scott (left) and Democrat Franklin Pierce (right) in the 1852 United States presidential election.

Union Party activity in the 1852 United States presidential election centered around Webster, who marketed himself to Whigs and Unionists as a potential presidential candidate. In a contentious scene at the 1852 Whig National Convention, Webster's supporters blocked Fillmore's nomination for three days before the exhausted delegates at last selected the aged major general Winfield Scott. Undaunted, Webster's Union Party allies engineered his nomination by a faction of the Georgia Constitutional Union Party. Furious at Scott's nomination, conservative Whigs determined to humiliate their intraparty rivals joined the Webster movement. Independent Webster tickets were nominated in Georgia, Massachusetts, New Jersey, New York, and Pennsylvania. In the free states, the Webster forces were supplemented by supporters of the Native American Party, who hoped to elect the Democratic candidates by diverting nativist Whig voters to Webster.

Webster, however, was by this time ambivalent about the election; privately, he advised friends to vote for the Democratic candidate, Franklin Pierce. The candidate's indecision reflected contradictory impulses that would lead to the decline of the Constitutional Union Party in Georgia. The Georgia Unionists had split between Union Democrats and Union Whigs, each of whom held out hope that the nomination of a pro-Compromise candidate would pave the way for reconciliation with their former parties. Following the 1852 Democratic National Convention, Union Democrats in the Constitutional Union state convention endorsed Pierce. Refusing to support the national Democratic candidates, Union Whigs held their own convention at Macon, Georgia, that nominated Webster. The Union Democrats subsequently withdrew their candidates in favor of the Pierce ticket nominated by the Southern Rights Party and declared the Constitutional Union Party dissolved; a minority who still opposed merger with the Southern Rights men held their own convention and nominated a separate ticket pledged to Pierce. Thus, voters in Georgia had the choice of four presidential tickets in 1852: the Southern Rights and Union Democratic tickets, each pledged to Pierce; the Union Whig ticket; and the regular Whig ticket pledged to Scott.

Webster's death one week prior to the election brought an abrupt end to his candidacy. He received 7,378 votes posthumously in Georgia, Massachusetts, and New York; Jacob Broom, the substitute Native American candidate, polled a further 2,415 votes in New Jersey and Pennsylvania. The Union Whig showing in Georgia accounted for 71 percent of Webster's national total. Two Union Democrats and one Union Whig were elected to Congress from Alabama; no other states returned Unionists to the 33rd United States Congress.

== Aftermath ==
=== Decline, 1853 ===
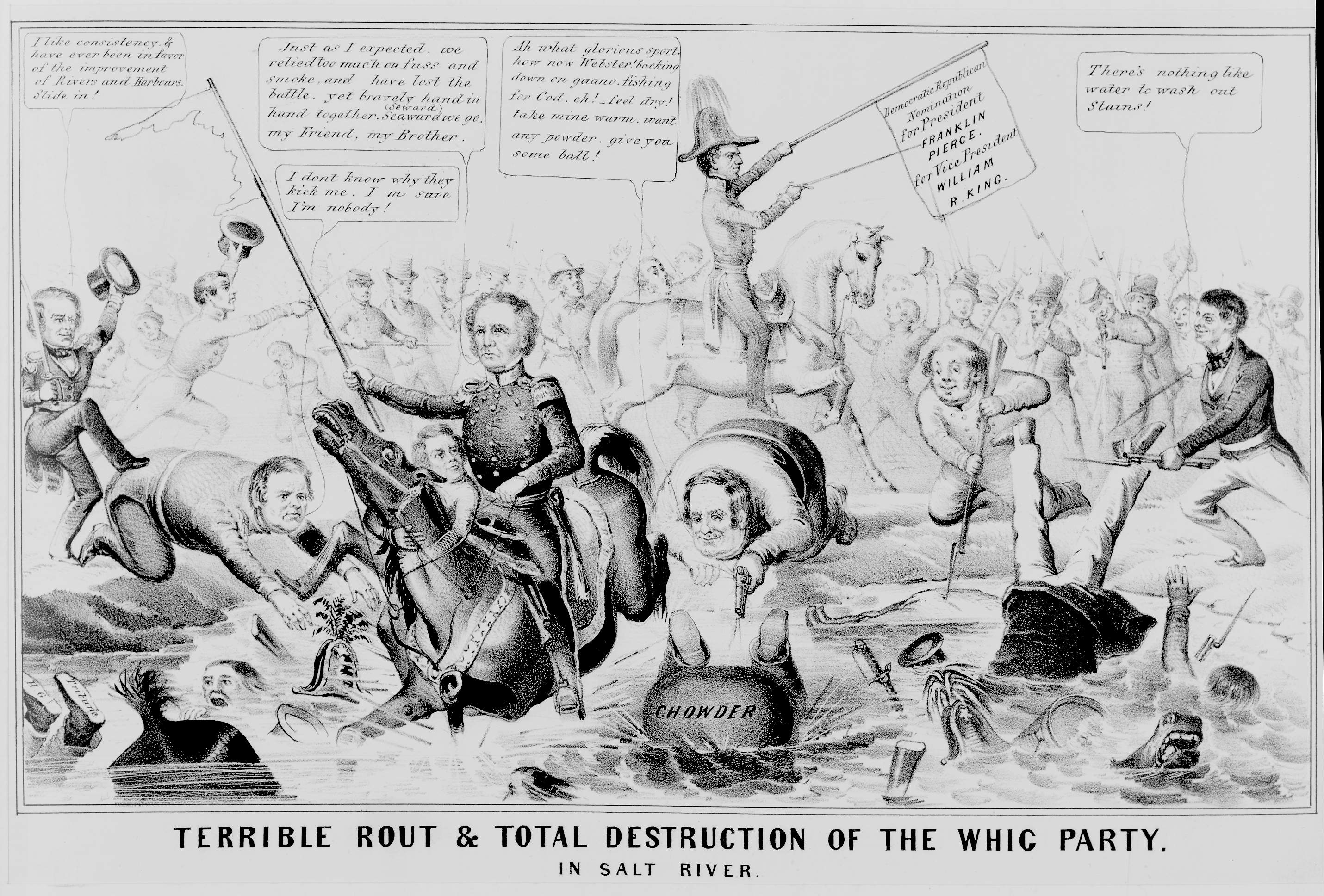
Terrible Rout and Total Destruction of the Whig Party (1852). Franklin Pierce leads the rout of the Whig Party in the 1852 United States presidential election. The late Union Party candidate Daniel Webster is seen floating face-down in Salt River, a symbol of electoral oblivion.

The outcome of the 1852 United States elections contributed to the collapse of the Second Party System. The national Whig ticket suffered the worst defeat of the party's history; of the 31 states, only Kentucky, Massachusetts, Tennessee, and Vermont gave their electoral votes to the Whig nominees for president and vice president. Whigs lost seats in both chambers of Congress and lost further ground in state and congressional elections held in 1853. Whig weakness masked similar troubles within the Democratic ranks, as factional, ideological, and denominational tensions divided organizations in several states.

Among conservatives, political fragmentation led to calls for the revival of the Union Party in 1853. In Georgia, Toombs and Stephens foiled an attempt to resurrect the Whig Party and succeeded in nominating Charles J. Jenkins for governor atop the Constitutional Union ticket. Democratic disunity encouraged some former Whigs to hope that a merger of conservatives in the Union Party was still possible. Among the converts to the Union Party cause was now former president Fillmore, who wrote to Kennedy that events permitting, "we may hope to see a national Union party which will cast off the secessionists of the South and the abolitionist freesoilers of the North and rally around the Constitution and sustain it in its purity."

In spite of this optimism, the Union Party campaign of 1853 did not lead to the formation of a new national party. Too few Democrats were tempted by a coalition with Whig conservatives to replicate the success of 1851. Jenkins's gubernatorial candidacy went down to defeat, and the Constitutional Union Party quickly fell out of existence. An attempt by Mississippi Whigs to rebuild their state's Union coalition similarly failed to deliver the governorship. In New York, where Union Party boosters were confident that intraparty factionalism would give birth to a conservative coalition, Whig and Democratic conservatives chose to remain and struggle for control of their state organizations rather than join their erstwhile rivals in a new party. Resentments held over from 1852, concerns for the allocation of patronage, and the rise of the temperance movement in Georgia hampered efforts to resurrect the Union Party in 1853.

=== Legacy, 1854–60 ===
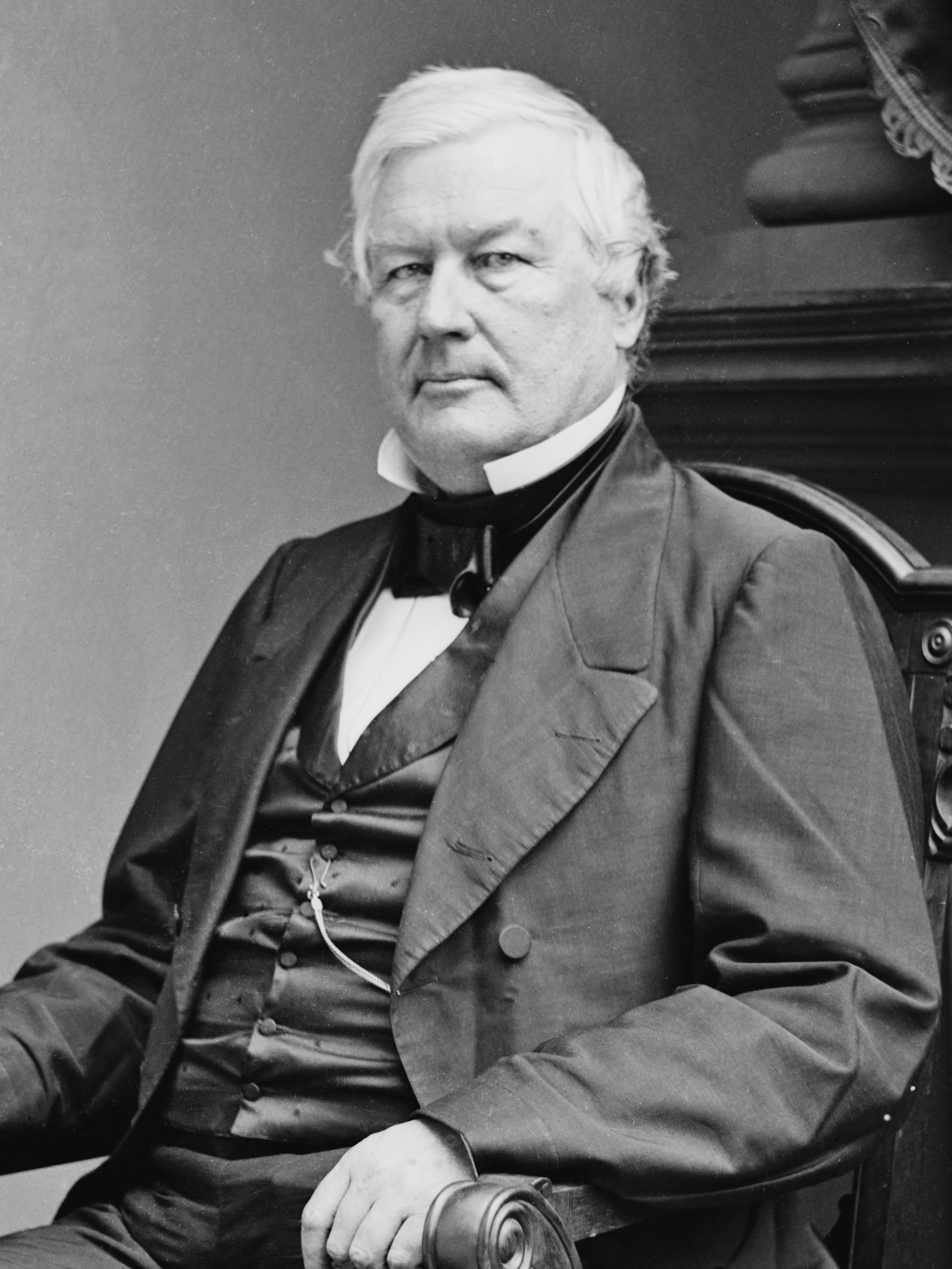
Millard Fillmore, frequently proposed as a Union presidential candidate after 1853

Developments after 1853 were not to the benefit of the Union Party. The rapid spread of nativism, anti-Catholicism, and prohibitionism was accompanied by the rise of the American ("Know Nothing") Party in the Northern United States. Simultaneously, the sudden appearance of the Kansas-Nebraska Act in January 1854 polarized national politics along sectional lines. Rather than join Northern Whigs in opposing the repeal of the Missouri Compromise, most Southern Whigs supported the measure. The resulting political realignment "derailed the Union party movement," driving a wedge between free state and slave state conservatives that precluded their cooperation in a national Union Party.

Belatedly, Fillmore's conservative allies joined the American Party in hopes that the surging Know Nothing movement could form the core of a bisectional Union coalition in the 1856 United States presidential election. Distinguished by their populistic, antipartisan ethos, many original Know Nothings proved hostile to attempts by conservative former Whigs to take over leadership of the party. The platform adopted by the 1855 American National Convention largely achieved Fillmore's goal of converting the Know Nothing movement into a national Union Party, but alienated most Northern Know Nothings in the process. Events in Bleeding Kansas foiled Fillmore's bid for a nonconsecutive second term; the former president carried only Maryland and finished a distant third behind the inaugural Republican candidate John C. Frémont and the victorious Democrat James Buchanan.

Some Union Whigs joined the Democratic Party after 1853, including Stephens and Toombs. Stephens supported Stephen Douglas in the 1860 United States presidential election, while Toombs backed the Southern Democratic candidate John C. Breckinridge. Both Georgians subsequently served in the Confederate Cabinet, Stephens as vice president and Toombs as secretary of state.

Later "Union" parties had few ties to the Union Party movement of 1850. During the 1860 election, a group of elder conservatives formed the Constitutional Union Party and nominated John Bell for president on a platform that vowed "to recognize no political principle other than the Constitution [...], the Union [...], and the Enforcement of the Laws." Unlike the earlier Union Party, the Bell movement was made up almost exclusively of former Whigs. Bell carried the slave states of Kentucky, Tennessee, and Virginia, but lost the election to Republican Abraham Lincoln. Supporters of Lincoln's administration subsequently organized the National Union Party during the Civil War. Some proponents envisioned the wartime Union Party as the base for a bisectional coalition to enact the Crittenden Compromise, but Lincoln's insistence on the non-extension of slavery foiled these efforts. The platform adopted by the 1864 National Union Convention endorsed passage of the Thirteenth Amendment to the United States Constitution, committing the party to the end of slavery in the United States.

== Electoral history ==
=== President ===
Presidential elections
Election	Ticket		Election result		
Election	Presidential nominee	Running mate	Popular vote	Electoral votes	Result
1852	Daniel Webster (Note: Webster died on October 24, 1852, nine days prior to the election.)	Charles J. Jenkins	0.23%	0 / 296	Lost

=== Congress ===
Congressional elections
Congress	House of Representatives				Senate			
Congress	Election	Seats	Change	Percent	Election	Seats	Change	Percent
32nd	1850–51	14 / 233	▲14	6.01	1850–51	0 / 62	Steady	0.00
33rd	1852–53	3 / 233 (Note: Including 2 Union Democrats and 1 Union Whig from Alabama.)	▼11	1.28	1852–53	1 / 62 (Note: Unionist Robert Toombs won the 1852 United States Senate election in Georgia to succeed retiring senator John M. Berrien. Toombs joined the Democratic Party in 1856 during the 34th United States Congress.)	▲1	1.61

=== Governors ===
Gubernatorial elections
State	1850	1851	1852	1853
Georgia	—N/a	59.66% (Won)	—N/a	49.73% (Lost)
Mississippi	—N/a	50.88% (Won)	—N/a	0.00% (n/a) (Note: No candidate.)
New York	49.57% (Lost) (Note: Horatio Seymour ran jointly on the Democratic and Union tickets.)	—N/a	0.00% (n/a)	—N/a

=== State legislatures ===
The following table shows state legislative seats held by the Union Party between 1851 and 1853.

State legislative seats
State	Seats	
State	Upper chamber	Lower chamber
Alabama	22 / 33	61 / 100
Georgia	39 / 47	104 / 130
Mississippi	11 / 32	35 / 99

== Bibliography ==
- Dubin, Michael J. (2007). Party Affiliations in State Legislatures: A Year by Year Summary, 1796–2006. Jefferson, NC: McFarland and Company.
- Dubin, Michael J. (March 1, 1998). United States Congressional Elections, 1788–1997: The Official Results of the Elections of the 1st through 105th Congresses. Jefferson, N.C.: McFarland and Company.
- Dubin, Michael J. (2003). United States Gubernatorial Elections, 1776–1860: The Official Results by State and County. Jefferson, NC: McFarland and Company. ISBN 978-0-7864-1439-0.
- Dubin, Michael J. (2002). United States Presidential Elections, 1788–1860: The Official Results by State and County. Jefferson, NC: McFarland & Co.
- Holt, Michael F. (2017). The Election of 1860: "A Campaign Fraught With Consequences". Lawrence: University Press of Kansas.
- Holt, Michael F. (1983). The Political Crisis of the 1850s. New York: W. W. Norton and Company.
- Holt, Michael F. (1999). The Rise and Fall of the American Whig Party: Jacksonian Politics and the Onset of the Civil War. New York: Oxford University Press.
- Howe, Daniel Walker (1979). The Political Culture of the American Whigs. Chicago: University of Chicago Press.
- Howe, Daniel Walker (2007). What Hath God Wrought: The Transformation of America, 1815–1848. New York: Oxford University Press.
- McPherson, James M. (1988). Battle Cry of Freedom: The Civil War Era. New York: Oxford University Press.
- Murray, Paul (December 1945). "Party Organization in Georgia Politics, 1825-1853". Georgia Historical Quarterly. 29 (4): 195–210. JSTOR 40576991.
