= 1852 United States presidential election in Alabama =

- November 2, 1852

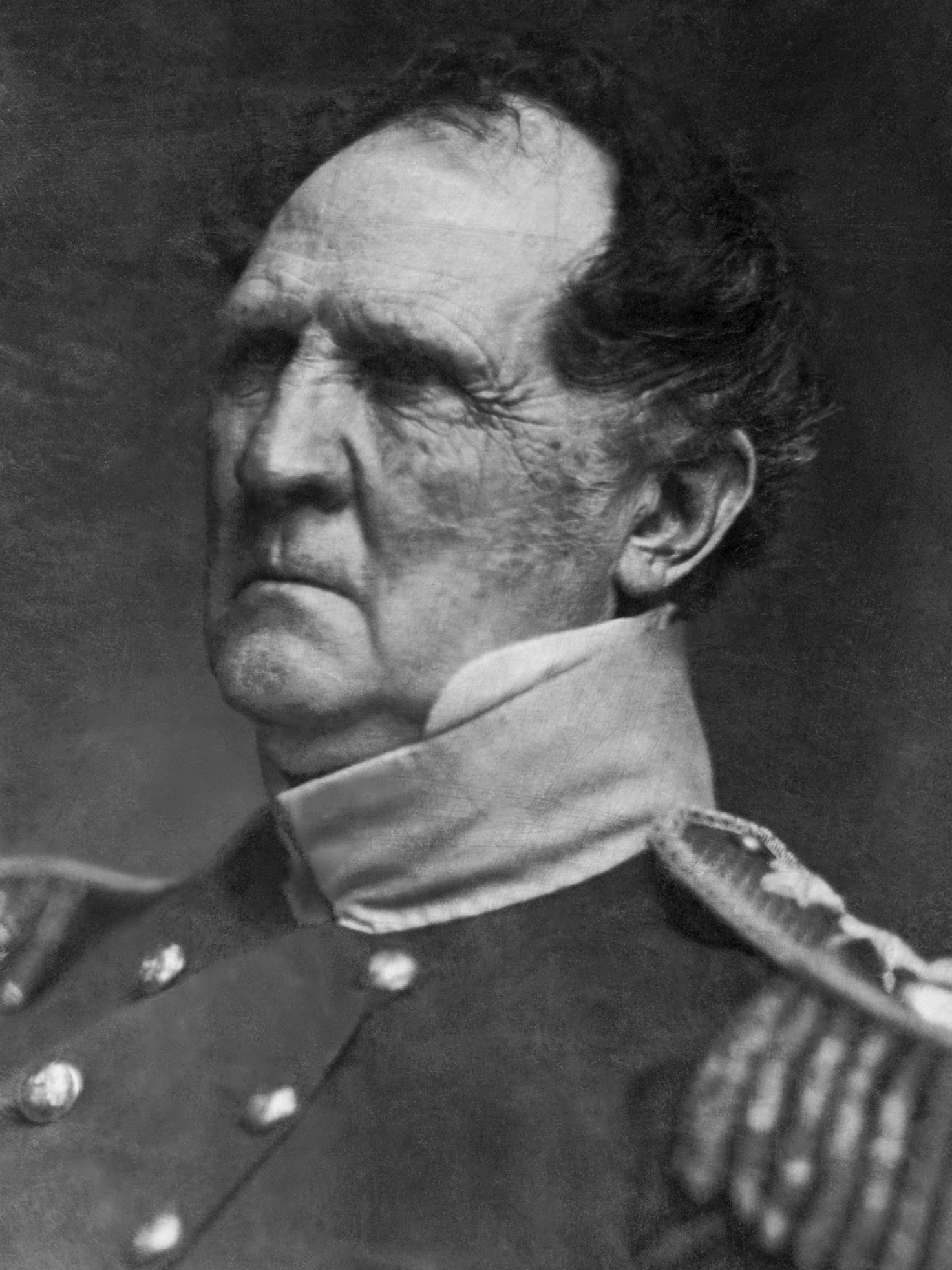

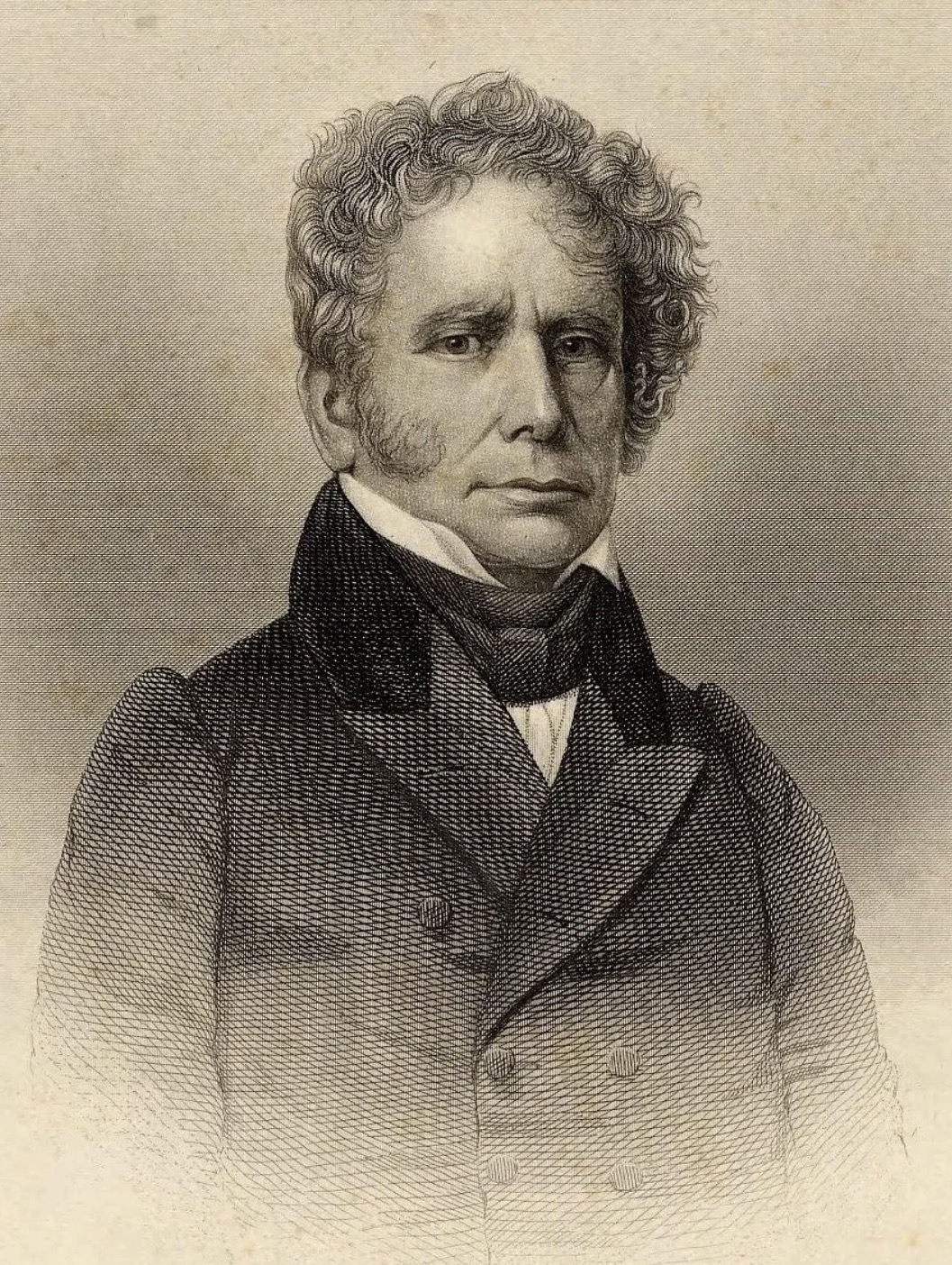
Nominee	Franklin Pierce	Winfield Scott	George Troup
Party	Democratic	Whig	Southern Rights
Home state	New Hampshire	New Jersey	Alabama
Running mate	William R. King	William Alexander Graham	John A. Quitman
Electoral vote	9	0	0
Popular vote	26,881	15,061	2,205
Percentage	60.89%	34.12%	5.01%

Pierce
40–50%
50–60%
60–70%
70–80%
80–90%
90–100%
Scott
40–50%
50–60%
Troup
30–40%
40–50%
President before election
Millard Fillmore
Whig
Elected President
Franklin Pierce
Democratic

The 1852 United States presidential election in Alabama took place on November 2, 1852, as part of the 1852 United States presidential election. Voters chose nine representatives, or electors to the Electoral College, who voted for president and vice president.

Alabama voted for the Democratic candidate, Franklin Pierce, over Whig candidate Winfield Scott and Southern Rights candidate George Troup. Pierce won Alabama by a margin of 26.77%.

== Results ==
1852 United States presidential election in Alabama
Party	Candidate	Votes	%
Democratic	Franklin Pierce	26,881	60.89%
Whig	Winfield Scott	15,061	34.12%
Southern Rights	George Troup	2,205	5.01%
Total votes		44,147	100%

=== Results by county ===
1852 United States Presidential Election in Alabama (by county)
County	Franklin Pierce Democratic		Winfield Scott Whig		George Troup Southern Rights		Total votes cast
County	#	%	#	%	#	%	Total votes cast
Autauga	322	44.54%	196	27.11%	205	28.35%	723
Baldwin	72	53.73%	62	46.27%	0	0.00%	134
Barbour	309	26.25%	297	25.23%	571	48.51%	1,177
Benton	918	92.54%	74	7.46%	0	0.00%	992
Bibb	346	58.94%	238	40.55%	3	0.51%	587
Blount	422	88.47%	55	11.53%	0	0.00%	477
Butler	251	42.11%	345	57.89%	0	0.00%	596
Chambers	616	47.20%	668	51.19%	21	1.61%	1,305
Cherokee	735	75.23%	242	24.77%	0	0.00%	977
Choctaw	334	59.33%	227	40.32%	2	0.36%	563
Clarke	479	80.37%	98	16.44%	19	3.19%	596
Coffee	239	64.59%	113	30.54%	18	4.86%	370
Conecuh	287	55.41%	216	41.70%	15	2.90%	518
Coosa	709	67.85%	294	28.13%	42	4.02%	1,045
Covington	117	66.10%	52	29.38%	8	4.52%	177
Dale	406	66.89%	170	28.01%	31	5.11%	607
Dallas	440	41.12%	386	36.07%	244	22.80%	1,070
DeKalb	501	78.28%	139	21.72%	0	0.00%	640
Fayette	516	86.43%	81	13.57%	0	0.00%	597
Franklin	993	68.01%	462	31.64%	5	0.34%	1,460
Greene	555	44.08%	694	55.12%	10	0.79%	1,259
Hancock	65	87.84%	9	12.16%	0	0.00%	74
Henry	184	44.02%	94	22.49%	140	33.49%	418
Jackson	1,154	93.29%	83	6.71%	0	0.00%	1,237
Jefferson	339	74.83%	114	25.17%	0	0.00%	453
Lauderdale	803	64.55%	441	35.45%	0	0.00%	1,244
Lawrence	588	53.21%	512	46.33%	5	0.45%	1,105
Limestone	662	74.47%	227	25.53%	0	0.00%	889
Lowndes	186	35.91%	126	24.32%	206	39.77%	518
Macon	658	43.03%	772	50.49%	99	6.47%	1,529
Madison	1,300	78.60%	354	21.40%	0	0.00%	1,654
Marengo	526	52.81%	450	45.81%	20	2.01%	996
Marion	467	79.83%	118	20.17%	0	0.00%	585
Marshall	568	83.65%	111	16.35%	0	0.00%	679
Mobile	1,380	53.14%	1,123	43.24%	94	3.62%	2,597
Monroe	260	45.69%	264	46.40%	45	7.91%	569
Montgomery	557	40.60%	717	52.26%	98	7.14%	1,372
Morgan	482	69.65%	208	30.06%	2	0.29%	692
Perry	512	65.14%	261	33.21%	13	1.65%	786
Pickens	752	56.58%	568	42.74%	9	0.68%	1,329
Pike	703	60.97%	379	32.87%	71	6.16%	1,153
Randolph	707	87.07%	102	12.56%	3	0.37%	812
Russell	522	53.27%	434	44.29%	24	2.45%	980
Shelby	315	49.61%	317	49.92%	3	0.47%	635
St. Clair	455	91.18%	44	8.82%	0	0.00%	499
Sumter	497	50.56%	482	49.03%	4	0.41%	983
Talladega	672	64.12%	372	35.50%	4	0.38%	1,048
Tallapoosa	845	69.55%	351	28.89%	19	1.56%	1,215
Tuscaloosa	475	47.27%	527	52.44%	3	0.30%	1,005
Walker	217	80.07%	54	19.93%	0	0.00%	271
Washington	65	54.62%	52	43.70%	2	1.68%	119
Wilcox	398	47.89%	286	34.42%	147	17.69%	831
Totals	26,881	60.89%	15,061	34.12%	2,205	4.99%	44,147

== See also ==
- United States presidential elections in Alabama
