= Georgia Platform =

The Georgia Platform was a statement executed by a Georgia Convention in Milledgeville, Georgia on December 10, 1850, in response to the Compromise of 1850. Supported by Unionists, the document affirmed the acceptance of the Compromise as a final resolution of the sectional slavery issues while declaring that no further assaults on the legality of slavery by the Northern United States would be acceptable. The Platform had political significance throughout the Southern United States. In the short term, it was an effective antidote to secession, but in the long run it contributed to sectional solidarity and the demise of the Second Party System in the South. Much of the document was written by Charles J. Jenkins, a Whig lawyer and state legislator from Augusta.

== Background ==
Sectional tensions over the issue of the westward expansion of slavery, previously resolved by the Missouri Compromise, were reawakened with the debate over Texas Annexation and the Mexican War. Texas Annexation was the major issue in the national elections of 1844, but, despite some signs of a sectional split, the election was resolved along the established party lines. Opposition to the Mexican War and, especially, opposition to acquiring new territory, also split largely along party lines.

It was only with the introduction of the Wilmot Proviso in August 1846 that the national debate began to split along sectional lines. During the "prolonged deadlock of 1846-50" the idea of secession as a possible solution to Northern threats against slavery began to take root among more and more Southerners. In December 1849 Congressman Alexander Stephens, the future vice-president of the Confederacy, wrote to his brother, "I find the feeling among the Southern members for a dissolution of the Union – if the antislavery [measures] should be pressed to extremity – is becoming more general than at first."

In the United States Congress the issues dividing North and South were debated ferociously, leading to the Compromise of 1850 that was intended to address all outstanding issues relating to slavery. After an early failure to pass a single omnibus bill, in September 1850 President Millard Fillmore signed the five separate bills that made up the compromise.

Around the same time, radicals within the South pursued their own solution, leading to the Nashville Convention in June 1850 that some hoped would become a secessionist convention. The convention denounced the proposed compromise, but rejected secession over any territorial restrictions on slavery in favor of extending the Missouri Compromise line to the west coast.

== Unionists versus Southern Rights Parties ==
Secessionist strength was strongest in Mississippi, Alabama, Georgia, and South Carolina. In the first three of these states there arose local Union or Constitutional Parties to counter the radical Southern Rights parties which were forming. In South Carolina the Southern Rights agenda was already the dominant force in the state, and its leaders were already pressing the other states for secession. The new Union parties attracted the overwhelming majority of Whigs in the three states. In Alabama and Mississippi the Whigs had been weak, and the creation of the Union parties revitalized the opposition to the dominant state Democratic Parties.

In Alabama, the state divided along sectional lines. In the north of the state the pro-compromise Union Party had its greatest strength while Democrats in the south organized the Southern Rights Party.

In Mississippi, Governor John Quitman and Jefferson Davis led the Southern rights group, while Senator Henry S. Foote, who had lost status in the state over his support for the compromise, was the most visible face of the Union Party.

Georgia had a strong Whig Party led by Alexander Stephens and Robert Toombs. They had already led a Whig revolt against President Zachary Taylor although they ended up supporting the compromise (although both voted against the bill abolishing the slave trade in the District of Columbia). They were joined in their state efforts to form the Constitutional Union Party by moderate Democrat Howell Cobb. Their opposition came from Democratic Governor George Towns and Hershel V. Johnson and fellow Whig John M. Berrien.

After the final approval of the bills making up the Compromise of 1850, the radicals acted. In Mississippi, Governor Quitman called for a special legislative session in November to discuss the state's reaction to the compromise. The Nashville Convention reconvened in November, but it was poorly attended and accomplished nothing. In South Carolina, there was already a regular legislative session scheduled for November, and Governor Whitemarsh Seabrook was persuaded not to take any special actions that might evoke the memories of South Carolina extremism during the Nullification Crisis. However, the most significant action would occur in Georgia.

== Georgia Acts ==
Governor Towns of Georgia, acting under the instructions of the state legislature, called for a special election to a state convention. The convention, scheduled for November, was intended to determine the appropriate response to the Compromise of 1850.

Robert Barnwell Rhett from South Carolina and William Lowndes Yancey from Alabama joined local Georgians in supporting the Southern Rights party to the "extent of ruining the state Democratic Party". Stephens, Toombs, and Cobb traversed the state in opposition with Stephens alone estimating that he traveled over 3,000 miles in the campaign.

Unionists outpolled their opponents by 46,000 to 24,000 in the election to the convention, which included a 10 to 1 ratio of delegates committed against secession. Stephens and Toombs were delegates to the convention and used it to officially organize the state Constitutional Union Party. Meanwhile, in Alabama, Mississippi, and South Carolina the Georgia election results, along with the inaction of the Nashville Convention, put a damper on secessionists.

The task of the convention became the creation of a position that both supported the Compromise of 1850 as the final solution to the sectional disputes over the expansion of slavery into new territories while maintaining a strong position for protecting the legality of slavery where it already existed. They did this by approving what came to be known as the Georgia Platform. The document in full is as follows:

Be it Resolved by the People of Georgia in Convention assembled,

1st, That we hold the American Union, secondary in importance only to the rights and principles it was designed to perpetuate. That past associations, present fruition, and future prospects, will bind us to it so long as it continues to be the safeguard of those rights and principles.

Secondly, That if the thirteen original parties to the contract, bordering the Atlantic in a narrow belt, while their separate interests were in embryo their peculiar tendencies scarcely developed, their revolutionary trials and triumphs, still green in memory, found Union impossible without Compromise, the thirty-one of this day, may well yield somewhat, in the conflict of opinion and policy, to preserve that Union which has extended the sway of republican government over a vast wilderness to another ocean, and proportionally advanced their civilization and national greatness.

Thirdly, That in this spirit, the State of Georgia has maturely considered the action of Congress embracing a series of measures for the admission of California into the Union, the organization of territorial Governments for Utah and New Mexico, the establishment of a boundary between the latter and the State of Texas, the suppression of the slave trade in the District of Columbia, and the extradition of fugitive slaves, and (connected with them) the rejection of propositions to exclude slavery from the Mexican territories and to abolish it in the District of Columbia, and whilst she does not wholly approve, will abide by it as a permanent adjustment of this sectional controversy.

Fourthly, That the State of Georgia in the judgment of this Convention, will and ought to resist even (as a last resort,) to a disruption of every tie which binds her to the Union, any action of Congress upon the subject of slavery in the District of Columbia, or in any places subject to the jurisdiction of Congress incompatible with the safety, domestic tranquility, the rights and honor of the slave-holding States, or any refusal to admit as a State any territory hereafter, applying, because of the existence of slavery therein, or any act prohibiting the introduction of slaves into the territories of New Mexico and Utah, or any act repealing or materially modifying the laws now in force for the recovery of fugitive slaves.

Fifthly, That it is the deliberate opinion of this Convention, that upon the faithful execution of the Fugitive Slave Bill by the proper authorities depends the preservation of our much loved Union.

In a very neat package, the platform offered support for both union and compromise, identified specific future restrictions on slavery which would not be tolerated, and kept alive the possibility of secession as a future remedy. Many Southerners felt that the Compromise of 1850 had been shaped more towards Northern interests; the Georgia Platform made it clear that the future of the nation depended on the North strictly adhering to the Compromise.

== Repercussions ==
Mississippi and Alabama joined Georgia in accepting the Georgia Platform. As a political ploy, the Platform thoroughly undermined any effective response from the Southern Rights parties. Generally the Compromise was popular throughout the South, and historian William J. Cooper Jr. made the point that, "Although the confrontation was not in fact a union-disunion one anywhere, the successful Unionist onslaught made it seem like one." Historian David Potter stated that the Georgia Platform "became the cornerstone of southern policy for several years."

The state elections of 1851 reflected the popularity of the Unionist position. In Georgia, Cobb was elected governor, Stephens was reelected to the House of Representatives, and Toombs was appointed to the United States Senate. In Mississippi, Foote defeated Jefferson Davis for the United States Senate seat. In the elections to the House of Representatives, Alabama, Georgia, and Mississippi returned 14 Unionists and only 5 Southern Rights candidates. In the rest of the South, the Whigs generally gained seats in Congress.

In South Carolina, there was basically only one political party, and it was divided between those advocating that South Carolina act alone and those that wanted action only in cooperation with other states. The South Carolina legislature called for both a state convention and another Southern Congress in early 1852 in Memphis. However the election turnout for the convention was very light, and the victories of Unionists elsewhere ensured that the Memphis convention never occurred.

The Union Parties, despite the hopes and efforts of Stephens and others, did not become a national party. Cooper wrote:

Political parties in the South lived and prospered only through their real or supposed ability to protect the South and her institutions. A party confined to Alabama, Georgia, and Mississippi could make no believable claims for protecting anything.

Ultimately the very success of the Georgia Platform meant that it soon became a basic part of Democratic Party policy. Neither the isolated Union Parties nor the remaining Whigs in other states were able to offer an effective counter to the Democrats who now appeared to offer the best protection for maintaining the legality of slavery. This contributed to the dissolution of the Second Party System within the South.

== See also ==
- Golden Circle
- Slave codes
- Slave Trade Acts

== Bibliography ==
- Cooper, William J. (1978). The South and the Politics of Slavery 1828-1856. Louisiana State University Press. ISBN 0-8071-0385-3.
- Craven, Avery (1942). The Coming of the Civil War. University of Chicago Press. ISBN 0-226-11894-0.
- Davis, William C. (2001). The Union that Shaped the Confederacy: Robert Toombs & Alexander Stephens. University Press of Kansas. ISBN 0-7006-1088-X.
- Holt, Michael F. (1999). The Rise and Fall of the American Whig Party: Jacksonian Politics and the Onset of the Civil War. Oxford university Press. ISBN 0-19-505544-6.
- Huston, James L. (2000). "Southerners Against Secession: The Arguments of the Constitutional Unionists in 1850-51". Civil War History. 46 (4): 281–299. doi:10.1353/cwh.2000.0007. S2CID 144216596.
- Potter, David M. (1976). The Impending Crisis 1848-1861. Harper Collins Publishers. ISBN 0-06-131929-5.
