= Robert Toombs =

American lawyer (1810–1885)

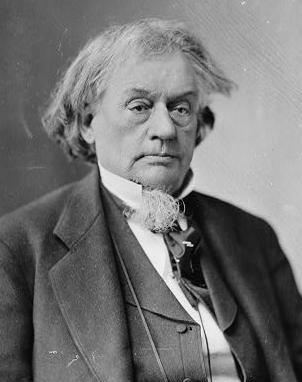

1st Confederate States Secretary of State
- In office February 25, 1861 – July 25, 1861
- President: Jefferson Davis
- Preceded by: Position established
- Succeeded by: Robert Hunter

United States Senator from Georgia
- In office March 4, 1853 – February 4, 1861
- Preceded by: Robert Charlton
- Succeeded by: Homer Miller

Member of the U.S. House of Representatives from Georgia's 8th district
- In office March 4, 1845 – March 3, 1853
- Preceded by: Constituency established
- Succeeded by: Alexander H. Stephens

Member of the Georgia House of Representatives from Wilkes County
- In office 1837–1843

Personal details
- Born: Robert Augustus Toombs; July 2, 1810 Washington, Georgia, U.S.
- Died: December 15, 1885 (aged 75) Washington, Georgia, U.S.
- Party: Whig (Before 1851); Constitutional Union (1851–1853); Democratic (1853–1885)
- Education: University of Georgia; Union College; University of Virginia

Military service
- Allegiance: Confederate States
- Branch: Confederate States Army; Georgia militia
- Years of service: 1861-1863 (C.S.); 1863-1865 (Ga.)
- Rank: Brigadier General
- Commands: Toombs' Brigade
- Battles: American Civil War; Seven Days Battles; Battle of Antietam (WIA); Battle of Columbus

Robert Augustus Toombs (July 2, 1810 – December 15, 1885) was an American politician from Georgia, who was an important figure in the formation of the Confederacy. From a privileged background as a wealthy planter and slaveholder, Toombs embarked on a political career marked by effective oratory, although he also acquired a reputation for hard living, disheveled appearance, and irascibility. He was identified with Alexander H. Stephens's libertarian wing of secessionist opinion, and in contradiction to the nationalist Jefferson Davis, Toombs believed a civil war to be neither inevitable nor winnable by the South.

Appointed as Secretary of State of the Confederacy (which lacked political parties), Toombs was against the decision to attack Fort Sumter, and resigned from Davis's cabinet. He was commissioned a brigadier general in the Confederate States Army and was wounded at the Battle of Antietam, where he performed creditably. During the 1865 Battle of Columbus, Toombs's reluctance to use canister shot on a mixture of Union and Confederate soldiers resulted in the loss of a key bridge in the war's final significant action. He avoided detention by traveling to Europe. On his return two years later, he declined to ask for a pardon, and successfully stood for election in Georgia when the Reconstruction era ended in 1877.

== Early life and education ==
Born near Washington, Georgia in 1810, Robert Augustus Toombs was the fifth child of Catherine Huling and planter Robert Toombs. He was of English descent. His father died when he was five. After private education, Toombs entered Franklin College at the University of Georgia in Athens when he was fourteen. During his time at Franklin College, Toombs was a member of the Demosthenian Literary Society. After the university chastised Toombs for unbecoming conduct in a card-playing incident, he continued his education at Union College, in Schenectady, New York. He graduated there in 1828. He returned to the South to study law at the University of Virginia Law School in Charlottesville.

=== Marriage and family ===
Shortly after his admission to the Georgia bar, on November 18, 1830, Toombs married his childhood sweetheart, Martha Juliann ("Julia") DuBose (1813–1883), daughter of Ezekiel DuBose and his wife of Lincoln County, Georgia. They had three children. Lawrence Catlett (1831–1832) died of scarlet fever. Mary Louisa (1833–1855) married and died in childbirth, along with her baby. Sarah (Sallie) (1835–1866) married Dudley M. DuBose, a distant cousin. She died of complications of childbirth, together with her fifth child Julian.

== Early legal and political career ==
Toombs was admitted to the Georgia bar and began his legal practice in 1830. He entered politics, gaining election to the Georgia House of Representatives, where he served in 1838. He failed to win re-election, but was elected again in the next term, serving 1840–1841. He failed again to win re-election, but was elected in 1842, serving a third, non-successive term, 1843–1844.

Toombs won a seat in the United States House of Representatives in 1844, and would win re-election several times. He served several terms in the lower chamber until 1853. In 1852 the state legislature elected him to the US Senate. There Toombs joined his close friend and fellow representative Alexander H. Stephens from Crawfordville, Georgia. Their friendship became a powerful personal and political bond, and they effectively defined and articulated Georgia's position on national issues in the middle decades of the nineteenth century. Toombs, like Stephens, emerged as a states' rights partisan and became a national Whig. After that party dissolved, Toombs aided in the creation of the short-lived Constitutional Union Party in the early 1850s.

As did most Whigs, Toombs considered Texas to be the 28th state, but he opposed the Mexican–American War.

== Slaveholdings ==
Toombs and his brother Gabriel owned large plantations and operated them using enslaved African Americans. Toombs increased his personal slave holdings as his wealth increased. Toombs owned six slaves in 1840. By 1850, he owned 17 slaves. In 1860, he owned 16 slaves at his Wilkes County plantation, and an additional 32 slaves at his 3,800-acre plantation in Stewart County, Georgia on the Chattahoochee River.

By 1860, Toombs and his wife lived without any other family members in Wilkes County; in the census that year, Toombs owned $200,000 in real estate; the value of his personal property, primarily made up of slaves, totaled $250,000. One of his slaves, Garland H. White, escaped just before the Civil War. He became a soldier and chaplain in the Union Army in 1862. Other slaves were freed by the Union Army as it occupied areas of Georgia. William Gaines and Wesley John Gaines (1840–1912), also former slaves of Toombs, both became church leaders.

== From Unionist to Confederate ==
Throughout the 1840s and 1850s, Toombs fought to reconcile national policies with his personal and sectional interests. In common with Alexander H. Stephens and Howell Cobb, he defended Henry Clay's Compromise of 1850 against southerners who advocated secession from the Union as the only solution to sectional tensions over slavery, though during the debate leading up to that compromise he had declared, "if by your legislation you seek to drive us from the Territories purchased by the common blood and treasure of the people, and to abolish slavery in the District, thereby attempting to fix a national degradation upon half the States of this confederacy, I am for disunion, and if my physical courage be equal to the maintenance of my convictions of right and duty I will devote all I am and all I have on earth to its consummation." He denounced the Nashville Convention, opposed the secessionists in Georgia, and helped to frame the famous Georgia platform (1850). His position and that of Southern Unionists during the decade 1850–1860 was pragmatic; he thought secession was impractical.

From 1853 to 1861, Toombs served in the United States Senate. He reluctantly joined the Democratic Party when lack of interest among voters in other states doomed the Constitutional Union Party. Toombs favored the Kansas–Nebraska Act of 1854, the admission of Kansas as a slave state under the Lecompton Constitution, and the English Bill (1858). However, his faith in the resiliency and effectiveness of the national government to resolve sectional conflicts waned as the 1850s drew to a close.

Toombs was present on May 22, 1856, when Congressman Preston Brooks beat Senator Charles Sumner with a cane on the Senate floor. As Brooks thrashed Sumner, his House allies Laurence M. Keitt and Henry A. Edmundson prevented witnesses from coming to Sumner's aid, with Keitt brandishing a pistol to keep them at bay. Senator John J. Crittenden attempted to intervene, and pleaded with Brooks not to kill Sumner. Toombs interceded for Crittenden, begging Keitt not to attack someone who was not a party to the Brooks-Sumner dispute. Later Toombs suggested that he had no issue with Brooks beating Sumner, and in fact approved of it.

On June 24, 1856, Toombs introduced the Toombs Bill, which proposed a constitutional convention in Kansas under conditions that were acknowledged by various anti-slavery leaders as fair. This marked the greatest concessions made by pro-slavery senators during the struggle over Kansas. But the bill did not provide for the submission of the proposed state constitution to popular vote, where, as the vote on the Lecompton Constitution showed, it would have been soundly defeated. The silence on this point of the territorial law, under which the Lecompton Constitution of Kansas was framed in 1857, was the crux of the Lecompton struggle.

According to historian Jacob S. Clawson, he was "a bullish politician whose blend of acerbic wit, fiery demeanor, and political tact aroused the full spectrum of emotions from his constituents and colleagues....[he] could not balance his volatile personality with his otherwise keen political skill."

Toombs decried what he saw as support in the North for John Brown's raid on Harpers Ferry in 1859. "The thousands of blind Republicans who do openly approve the treason, murder, and arson of John Brown, get no condemnation from their party for such acts. …It is vain, in face of these injuries, to talk of peace, fraternity, and common country. There is no peace; there is no fraternity; there is no common country; all of us know it." Toombs declared that the South should "Never permit this Federal Government to pass into the traitors' hands of the black Republican party. …The enemy is at your door; wait not to meet him at your hearthstone; meet him at the door-sill, and drive him from the Temple of Liberty, or pull down its pillars and involve him in a common ruin."

== Secession ==
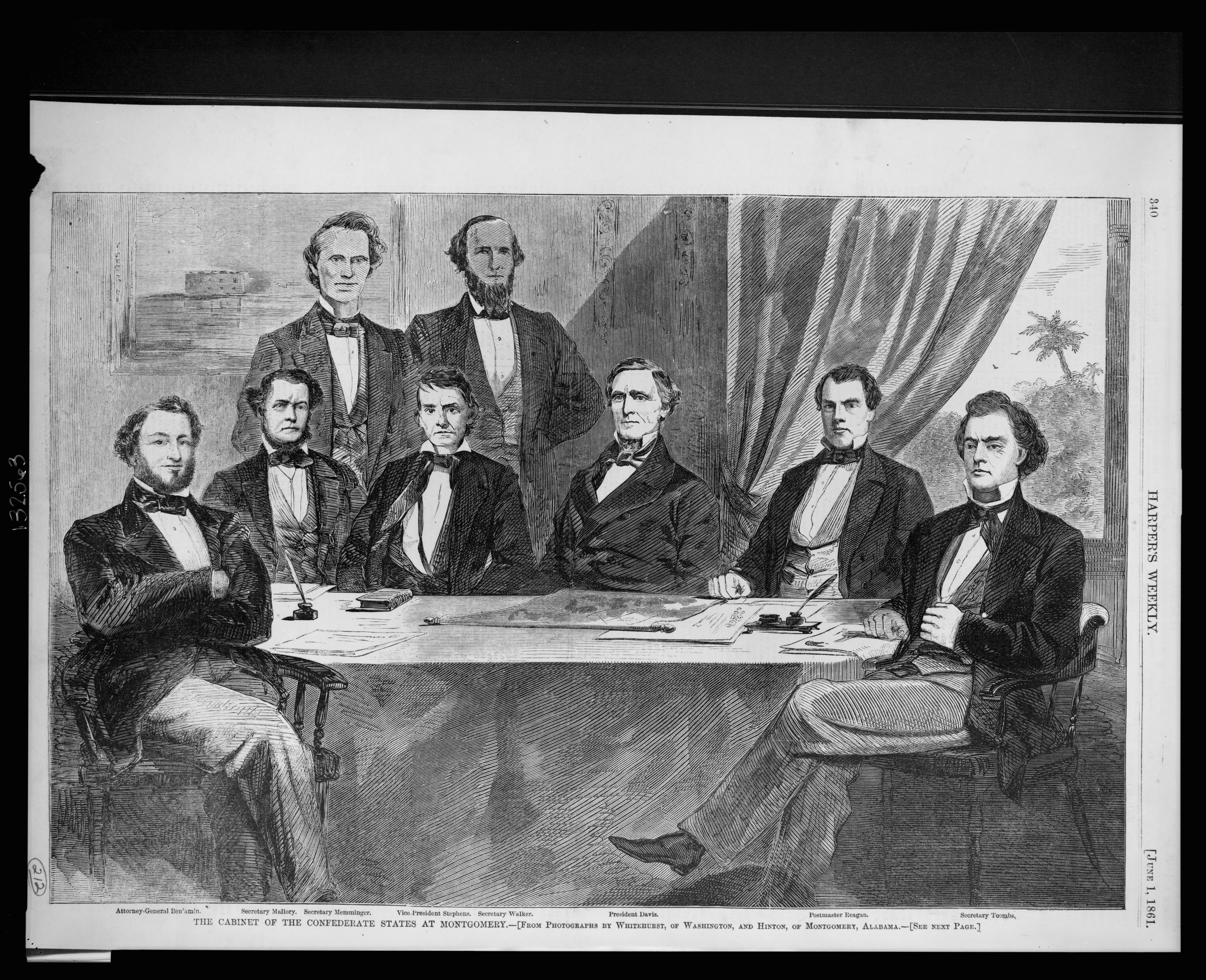
The original Confederate Cabinet. L-R: Judah P. Benjamin, Stephen Mallory, Christopher Memminger, Alexander Stephens, LeRoy Pope Walker, Jefferson Davis, John H. Reagan and Robert Toombs.

In the presidential campaign of 1860, Toombs supported John C. Breckinridge. After the election of Republican Abraham Lincoln Toombs initially urged caution "to test Republican willingness to do the South justice". On December 22 Toombs sent a telegram to Georgia that asserted that "secession by March 4 next should be thundered forth from the ballot-box by the united voice of Georgia." He delivered a farewell address in the US Senate (January 7, 1861) in which he said: "We want no negro equality, no negro citizenship; we want no negro race to degrade our own; and as one man [we] would meet you upon the border with the sword in one hand and the torch in the other." He returned to Georgia, and with Governor Joseph E. Brown led the fight for secession against Stephens and Herschel V. Johnson (1812–1880). His influence was a powerful factor in inducing the "old-line Whigs" to support immediate secession.

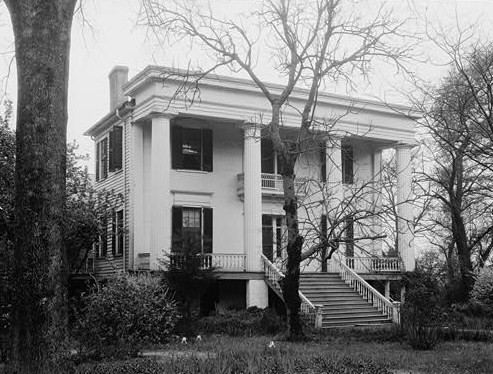
Toombs' house in Washington, Georgia, seen here in 1934.

Unlike the crises of 1850, these events galvanized Toombs and energized his ambitions of becoming the president of the new Confederate nation.

== Confederacy ==
The selection of Jefferson Davis as chief executive dashed Toombs's hopes of holding the high office of the fledgling Confederacy. In Georgia, it was expected the new president would be one of the delegates from Georgia. Toombs had a serious drinking problem which worried fellow delegates, leading him to not be selected. Toombs had no diplomatic skills, but Davis chose him as the Secretary of State. Toombs was the only member of Davis' administration to express dissent about the Confederacy's attack on Fort Sumter.

After reading Lincoln's letter to the governor of South Carolina, Toombs said to Davis:

"Mr. President, at this time it is suicide, murder, and will lose us every friend at the North. You will wantonly strike a hornet's nest which extends from mountain to ocean, and legions now quiet will swarm out and sting us to death. It is unnecessary; it puts us in the wrong; it is fatal."

=== Army general ===
Within months of his cabinet appointment, a frustrated Toombs resigned to join the Confederate States Army (CSA). He was commissioned as a brigadier general on July 19, 1861, and served first as a brigade commander in the (Confederate) Army of the Potomac, and then in David R. Jones' division of the Army of Northern Virginia. He commanded troops through the Peninsula Campaign, Seven Days Battles, Northern Virginia Campaign, and Maryland Campaign. He was wounded in the hand at the Battle of Antietam, where he commanded the defense of Burnside's Bridge.

Toombs resigned his CSA commission on March 3, 1863. He returned to Georgia, where he became colonel of the 3rd Cavalry of the Georgia Militia. He subsequently served as a brigadier general and adjutant and inspector-general of General Gustavus W. Smith's division of the Georgia Militia. He strongly criticized Davis and the Confederate government, opposing conscription and the suspension of habeas corpus. Newspapers warned that he verged on treason. At the Battle of Columbus in 1865, Toombs commanded the defense of the upper bridge.

When the war ended, Davis was arrested at Irwinville, Georgia, on May 10, 1865. On May 14, Union soldiers appeared at Toombs' home in Washington, Georgia, and demanded his appearance. He escaped into Alabama, thence by boat to New Orleans and by steam to Europe. He reached Paris, France, early in July 1865 along with P.G.T. Beauregard and Julia Colquitt, wife of another Confederate general. They were seeking to avoid arrest and trial as leaders of the Confederacy.

== Final years ==
His wife returned to Georgia in late 1866 following the death of their last surviving child, Sallie Toombs DuBose, in Washington County, Georgia. She went to help their widowed son-in-law care for several small children. Toombs missed his wife and returned to Georgia in 1867, but refused to request a pardon from the president. He never regained his right to vote nor hold political office during the Reconstruction era.

However, Toombs resumed his lucrative law practice, in connection with his son-in-law Dudley M. DuBose. The latter was elected in 1870 as a Democratic U.S. Representative and served one term. Toombs gradually resumed political power in Georgia. He funded and dominated the Georgia constitutional convention of 1877, in the year that federal troops were withdrawn from the South. He demonstrated the political skill and temperament that earlier had earned him a reputation as one of Georgia's most effective leaders. He gained a populist reputation for attacks on railroads and state investment in them.

== Death ==
1883 was a year marked by losses for Toombs. As March began, his son-in-law Dudley M. Dubose had a stroke and died. His long-time political ally, former Confederate Vice-president and Georgia Governor, Alexander H. Stephens, also died. By September, his beloved wife Julia died. After that, he sank into depression, alcoholism, and ultimately became blind.

Toombs died on December 15, 1885. He was buried at Resthaven Cemetery in Wilkes County, Georgia with his wife, his daughter, and son-in-law. Toombs was survived by four grandchildren.

== Legacy ==
The Georgia Department of Natural Resources owns the house and land; Wilkes County, Georgia operates the Robert Toombs House in Washington. Georgia also erected a historical marker in Clarkesville, Habersham County, Georgia concerning the Toombs-Bleckly House, which Toombs acquired as a summer residence in 1879 and sold to Georgia Supreme Court justice Logan E. Bleckley five years later, although it burned down in 1897.

These locations were named for Robert Toombs:

- Toombs County, Georgia is named for Robert Toombs.
- Wilkin County, Minnesota was originally Toombs County.
- Toombs Judicial Circuit includes the superior courts of Glascock County, Lincoln County, McDuffie County, Taliaferro County, Warren County, and Wilkes County.
- So is the Georgia town of Toomsboro, though with a slightly altered spelling.
- Camp Toombs in Toccoa, Georgia, was the training base of Easy Company, 506th Parachute Regiment during World War II and was named after him.
- Robert Toombs Christian Academy, a segregation academy in Lyons, Georgia, is named in his honor.

In addition, two steamships were named for him. The Liberty Ship SS Robert Toombs was launched in 1943 by the Southeastern Shipbuilding Corporation and served through World War II and after, eventually being sold for scrap. The troop transport USS General LeRoy Eltinge (AP-154) was sold out of federal service to the Waterman Steamship Company and rebuilt as a long hatch general cargo ship in 1968. Renamed the SS Robert Toombs, she served with Waterman until being sold for scrap in 1980.

== See also ==
- List of signers of the Georgia Ordinance of Secession
- Confederate States of America, causes of secession
- List of American Civil War generals (Confederate)
- Robert Toombs House

== Notes ==
U.S. House of Representatives
New constituency	Member of the U.S. House of Representatives from Georgia's 8th congressional district 1845–1853	Succeeded by Alexander Stephens
U.S. Senate
Preceded by William Dawson	United States Senator (Class 2) from Georgia; 1853–1861; Served alongside: Henry Foote, Alfred Iverson	Succeeded by Homer Miller^{(1)}
Political offices
New office	Confederate States Secretary of State; 1861	Succeeded by Robert Hunter
Notes and references
1. Because of Georgia's secession, the Senate seat was vacant for ten years before Miller succeeded Toombs.
