= Herschel V. Johnson =

American politician (1812–1880)

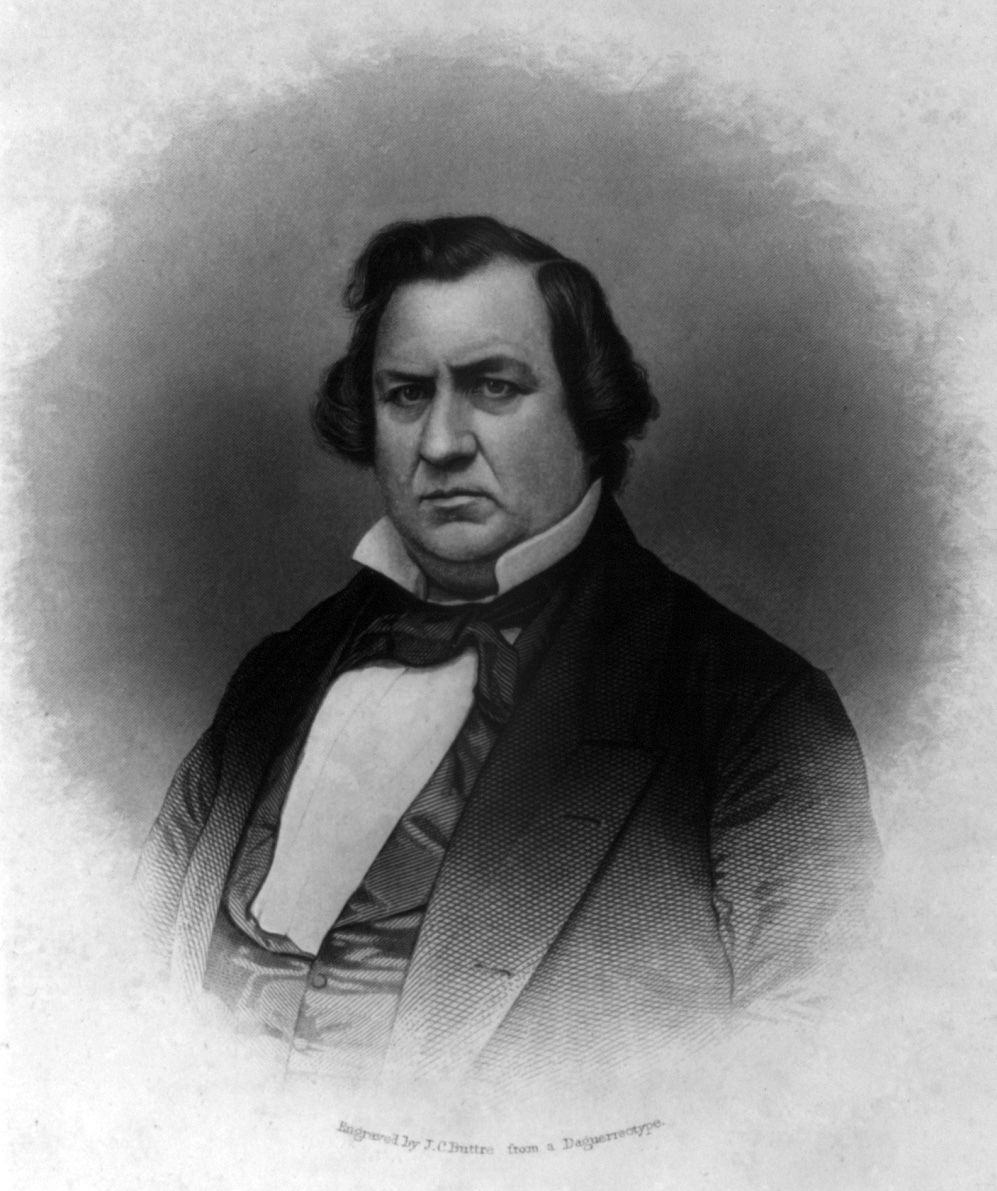

Confederate States Senator from Georgia
- In office January 19, 1863 – May 10, 1865
- Preceded by: John Lewis
- Succeeded by: Constituency abolished

41st Governor of Georgia
- In office November 9, 1853 – November 6, 1857
- Preceded by: Howell Cobb
- Succeeded by: Joseph Brown

United States Senator from Georgia
- In office February 4, 1848 – March 3, 1849
- Appointed by: George W. Towns
- Preceded by: Walter Colquitt
- Succeeded by: William Dawson

Personal details
- Born: Herschel Vespasian Johnson; September 18, 1812 Burke County, Georgia, U.S.
- Died: August 16, 1880 (aged 67) Louisville, Georgia, U.S.
- Party: Democratic
- Spouse: Ann Polk Walker
- Education: University of Georgia (BA)

Herschel Vespasian Johnson (September 18, 1812 – August 16, 1880) was an American politician. He was the 41st governor of Georgia from 1853 to 1857 and the vice presidential nominee of the Douglas wing of the Democratic Party in the 1860 U.S. presidential election. He also served as one of Georgia's Confederate States senators.

== Early life ==
Johnson was born near Farmer's Bridge in Burke County, Georgia. In 1834, he graduated from the University of Georgia. He studied at the private law school of Judge William T. Gould in Augusta, Georgia and was admitted to the bar.

He moved to Jefferson County in 1839 and began to practice law in Louisville, Georgia. In 1844, Johnson moved to the state capitol, Milledgeville, where he continued to practice law. During the 1850s, he would acquire the Samuel Rockwell House, a historic house in the city, as his summer house.

== Political life ==
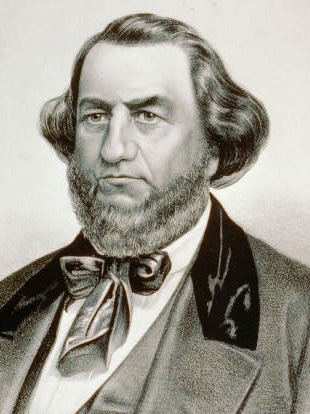
Herschel V. Johnson around the time he ran for vice president

He unsuccessfully ran for Congress in 1843. In 1844 he was a presidential elector, and cast his ballot for James K. Polk and George M. Dallas. He ran unsuccessfully for governor in 1847, and lost the Democratic nomination to George W. Towns; Towns won the general election, and in 1848 he appointed Johnson to the United States Senate seat vacated by the resignation of Walter T. Colquitt. Johnson served from February 4, 1848, to March 3, 1849, but was not a candidate for election to the seat. He returned to Georgia and served as a circuit court judge from 1849 to 1853. Johnson was a presidential elector in 1852.

In 1850, Johnson was a pro-slavery politician with strong secessionist leanings. In 1853, he was elected governor of Georgia, then re-elected in 1855. During the 1856 presidential campaign, Johnson declared that a Frémont victory would be grounds for secession. But while serving as governor, Johnson switched positions and became a strong unionist. After he finished his term as governor in 1857, Johnson County, Georgia was named in his honor.

In 1860, when the Democratic Party refused to add the support of extending slavery to the western territories to its platform, the party split. To try to recapture some southern votes, Johnson was chosen as the northern Democrats' nominee as the running mate of presidential candidate Stephen A. Douglas.

He was also a slave owner. In 1840, he owned 34 slaves in Jefferson County, Georgia. In 1850, he owned 7 slaves in Milledgeville, Georgia. He also owned 60 additional slaves in Jefferson County, Georgia. In 1860, he owned 115 slaves in Jefferson County, Georgia.

== Civil War ==
In 1861 he served as a delegate to the state secession convention, and opposed secession from the Union. When it became clear that Georgia would secede, however, he acquiesced out of loyalty to his state and served as a senator of the Second Confederate Congress from 1862 to the end of the war in 1865. In the Confederate Senate, he opposed conscription and the suspension of habeas corpus. After the Civil War, Johnson was a leader in the Reconstruction. Upon Georgia's readmission to the Union in 1866, he was chosen as a U.S. Senator, but was disallowed from serving due to his allegiance to the Confederate States of America. He again became a circuit court judge in 1873 and served until his death in 1880 in Louisville, Georgia.

Johnson served as president of Georgia's constitutional convention in 1865.

== See also ==
- List of signers of the Georgia Ordinance of Secession

== Works cited ==
- Nathans, Elizabeth (1968). Losing the Peace: Georgia Republicans and Reconstruction, 1865-1871. Louisiana State University Press.

U.S. Senate
Preceded by Walter Colquitt	United States Senator (Class 2) from Georgia; 1848–1849; Served alongside: John Berrien	Succeeded by William Dawson
Political offices
Preceded by Howell Cobb	Governor of Georgia; 1853–1857	Succeeded by Joseph Brown
Confederate States Senate
Preceded by John Lewis	Confederate States Senator (Class 1) from Georgia; 1863–1865; Served alongside: Benjamin Hill	Constituency abolished
Party political offices
Preceded by George W. Towns	Democratic nominee for Governor of Georgia; 1855	Succeeded by Joseph Brown
Preceded by Benjamin Fitzpatrick; Withdrew	Democratic nominee for Vice President of the United States^{(1)} 1860	Succeeded by George Pendleton
Notes and references
1. The Democratic Party split in 1860, producing two vice presidential candidates. Johnson replaced Fitzpatrick as the official nominee by the Northern Democrats; Joseph Lane was nominated by the rebel Southern Democrats.
