= Charles J. Jenkins =

American judge

- Engraving by H. B. Hall and Sons

44th Governor of Georgia
- In office December 14, 1865 – January 13, 1868
- Preceded by: James Johnson
- Succeeded by: Thomas H. Ruger

Attorney General of Georgia
- In office 1831-1834

Personal details
- Born: January 6, 1805 Beaufort, South Carolina
- Died: June 14, 1883 (aged 78) Augusta, Georgia
- Party: Democrat; Union (1852)
- Education: Union College
- Profession: Lawyer, politician

Charles Jones Jenkins (January 6, 1805 – June 14, 1883) was an American politician from Georgia. A Democrat, Jenkins served as Attorney General of Georgia from 1831 to 1834. He then went on to serve as Governor of Georgia from December 14, 1865 to January 13, 1868. He was removed from office and replaced by Thomas H. Ruger as military governor after Jenkins refused to allow state funds to be used for a racially integrated state constitutional convention. Jenkins remained a respected figure in Georgia, and despite not running for the office, he received two electoral votes in the 1872 United States presidential election, due to the premature death of candidate Horace Greeley.

== Early life ==
Jenkins was born in South Carolina. His family moved to Jefferson County, Georgia, and he attended the University of Georgia in Athens at a young age; his exact dates of attendance are not known. Jenkins left the university before graduating and finished his education in 1824 at Union College in Schenectady, New York. In 1831 Jenkins succeeded George W. Crawford as attorney general for the State of Georgia, himself succeeded in 1834 by Ebenezer Starnes.

== Political life ==
Jenkins first gained widespread attention as the author of the Georgia Platform, a proclamation by a special state convention that endorsed the Compromise of 1850. In the 1852 Presidential election, he ran for Vice President under presidential candidate Daniel Webster for the "Union Party". During the American Civil War, he was appointed by Governor Joseph E. Brown as a justice of the Supreme Court of Georgia.

After a state constitutional convention in 1865 re-established Georgia's state government, he ran as the only candidate for governor. He served as the Governor of Georgia from 1865 to 1868, during Reconstruction. In 1868, he refused to allow state funds to be used for a racially integrated state constitutional convention that was supervised by the U.S. military occupation. In response, General George Meade (of the Third Military District) installed Brig. General Thomas H. Ruger as military governor and Jenkins fled the state, taking with him the state seal to thwart state fund payments which had been ordered by the United States military authority. He later returned.

In the 1872 United States presidential election, he received two electoral college votes. In that election, Liberal Republican candidate Horace Greeley died after the election but before the electors convened and so two electors from Georgia cast their votes for Jenkins.

In the state constitutional convention of 1877, delegates unanimously chose Jenkins as president of the convention when they assembled on July 11, 1877.

== Death and legacy ==
Jenkins died on June 14, 1883. He was interred in Summerville Cemetery in Augusta, Georgia.

Jenkins County, Georgia is named in his honor.

== See also ==
- List of speakers of the Georgia House of Representatives

Party political offices
Preceded by Howell Cobb	Constitutional Union nominee for Governor of Georgia; 1853	Succeeded by None
Legal offices
Preceded by George W. Crawford	Attorney General of Georgia; 1834–1840	Succeeded by Ebenezer Starnes
Political offices
Preceded by James Johnson	Governor of Georgia; 1865–1868	Succeeded by Thomas H. Ruger
