= Wilmot Proviso =

Failed 1846 US proposal limiting slavery

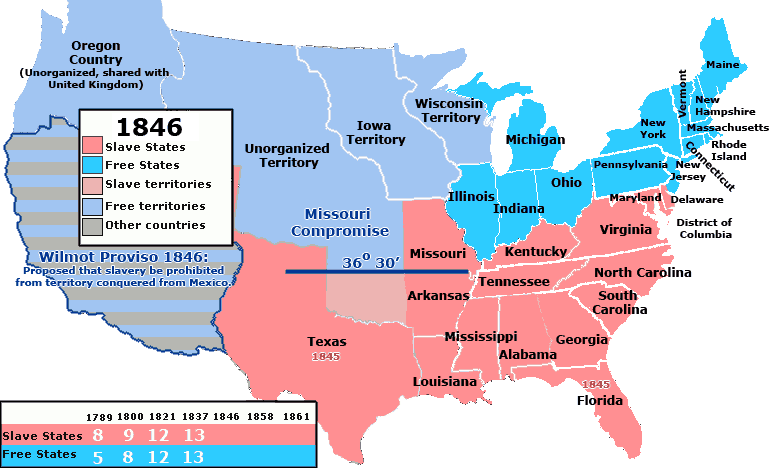
Illustration of the United States in 1846, including the Wilmot Proviso

The Wilmot Proviso was an unsuccessful 1846 proposal in the United States Congress to ban slavery in territory acquired from Mexico in the Mexican–American War. The conflict over the Wilmot Proviso was one of the major events leading to the American Civil War.

Congressman David Wilmot of Pennsylvania first introduced the proviso in the House of Representatives on August 8, 1846, as a rider on a $2,000,000 appropriations bill intended for the final negotiations to resolve the Mexican–American War (this was only three months into the two-year war). It passed the House largely on sectional lines between a generally anti-slavery North in favor and a pro-slavery South against, foreshadowing coming conflicts. It failed in the Senate, where the South had greater representation. The proviso was reintroduced in February 1847 and again passed the House and failed in the Senate. In 1848, an attempt to make it part of the Treaty of Guadalupe Hidalgo also failed. Sectional political disputes over slavery in the Southwest continued through the Compromise of 1850.

== Background ==
After an earlier attempt to acquire Texas by treaty had failed to receive the necessary two-thirds approval of the Senate, the United States annexed the Republic of Texas by a joint resolution of Congress that required simply a majority vote in each house of Congress. President John Tyler signed the bill on March 1, 1845, a few days before his term ended. As many expected, the annexation led to war with Mexico. After the Capture of New Mexico and California in the first phases of the Mexican-American War, the political focus shifted to how much territory would be acquired from Mexico. The key to this was the determination of the future status of slavery in any new territory.

Both major political parties had labored long to keep divisive slavery issues out of national politics. The Democrats had generally been successful in portraying those within their party attempting to push a purely sectional issue as extremists that were well outside the normal scope of traditional politics. However, midway through Polk's term, Democratic dissatisfaction with the administration was growing within the Martin Van Buren, or Barnburner, wing of the Democratic Party over other issues. Many felt that Van Buren had been unfairly denied the party's nomination in 1844 when southern delegates resurrected a convention rule, last used in 1832, requiring that the nominee had to receive two-thirds of the delegate votes. Many in the North were also upset with the Walker tariff which reduced the tariff rates; others were opposed to Polk's veto of a popular river and harbor improvements bill, and still others were upset over the Oregon settlement with Great Britain where it appeared that Polk did not pursue the northern territory with the same vigor he used to acquire Texas. Polk was seen more and more as enforcing strict party loyalty primarily to serve southern interests.

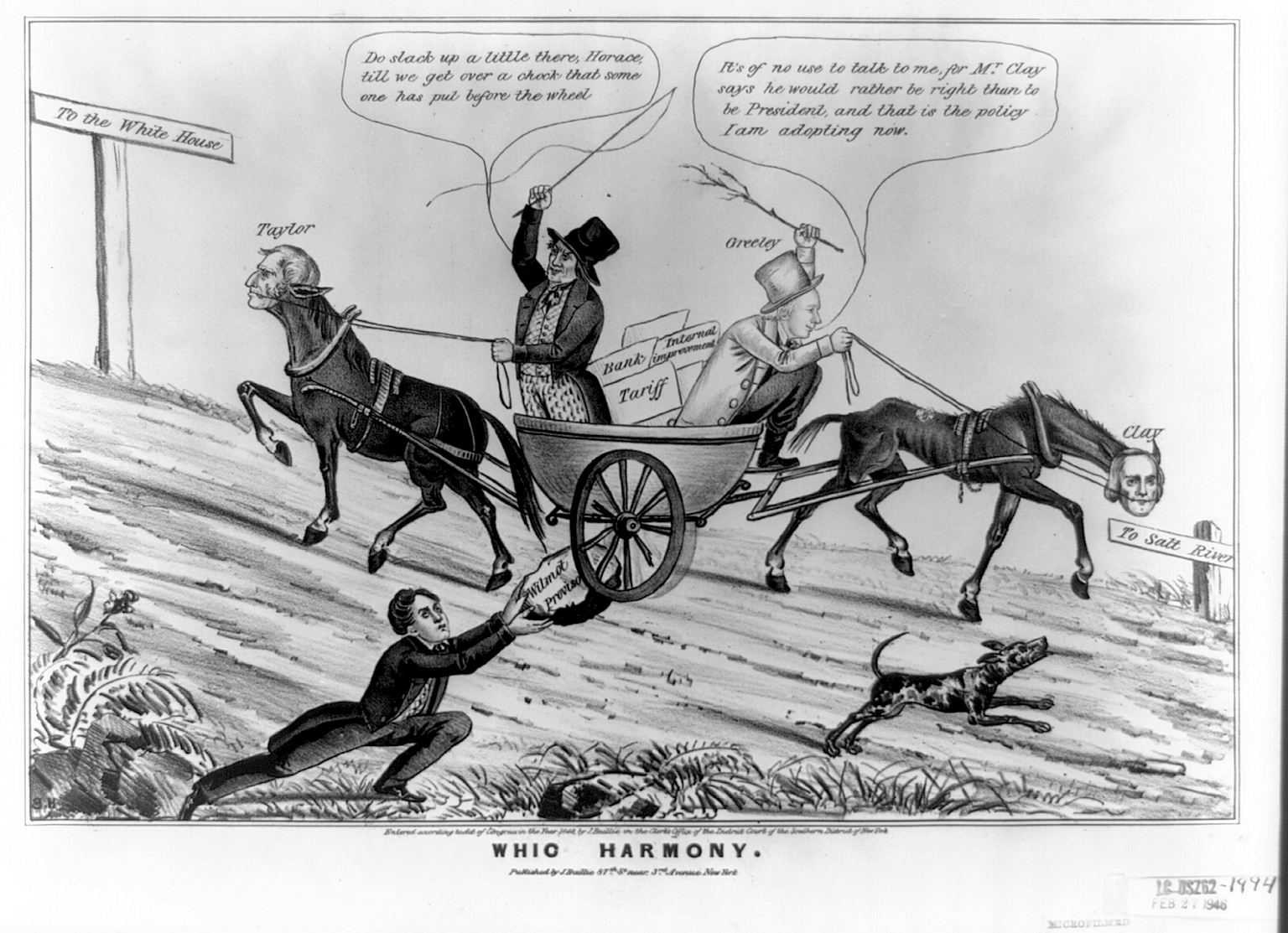
The Wilmot Proviso was seen as a stumbling block for presidential candidates, such as Taylor.

The Whigs faced a different scenario. The narrow victory of James K. Polk (Democrat) over Henry Clay (Whig) in the 1844 presidential election had caught the Southern Whigs by surprise. The key element of this defeat, which carried over into the congressional and local races in 1845 and 1846 throughout the South, was the party's failure to take a strong stand favoring Texas annexation. Southern Whigs were reluctant to repeat their mistakes on Texas, but, at the same time, Whigs from both sections realized that victory and territorial acquisition would again bring out the issue of slavery and the territories. In the South in particular, there was already the realization, or perhaps fear, that the old economic issues that had defined the Second Party System were already dead. Their political goal was to avoid any sectional debate over slavery which would expose the sectional divisions within the party.

The Mexican–American War was seen by many as an effort to gain more territory for the establishment of slave states. It was popular in the South, and much less so in the North, where opposition took many forms. For example, Henry David Thoreau refused to pay his poll tax, arguing that the money would be used to prosecute the war and gain slave territory.

== Introduction and debate on the proviso ==
On Saturday, August 8, 1846, President Polk submitted to Congress a request for $2,000,000 (~$64 million in 2025) in order to facilitate negotiations with Mexico over the final settlement of the war. The request came with no public warning after Polk had failed to arrange for approval of the bill with no Congressional debate. With Congress scheduled to adjourn that Monday, Democratic leadership arranged for the bill to be immediately considered in a special night session. The debate was to be limited to two hours with no individual speech to last more than ten minutes.

David Wilmot, a Democratic congressman from Pennsylvania, and a group of other Barnburner Democrats including Preston King and Timothy Jenkins of New York, Hannibal Hamlin of Maine, Gideon Welles of Connecticut, and Jacob Brinkerhoff of Ohio, had already been meeting in early August strategy meetings. Wilmot had a strong record of supporting the Polk Administration and was close to many Southerners. With the likelihood that Wilmot would have no trouble gaining the floor in the House debate, he was chosen to present the amendment to the appropriations bill that would carry his name. Wilmot offered the following to the House in language modeled after the Northwest Ordinance of 1787:

Provided, That, as an express and fundamental condition to the acquisition of any territory from the Republic of Mexico by the United States, by virtue of any treaty which may be negotiated between them, and to the use by the Executive of the moneys herein appropriated, neither slavery nor involuntary servitude shall ever exist in any part of said territory, except for crime, whereof the party shall first be duly convicted.

Unrealized proposals to extend the Missouri Compromise line (originally defined in a way that limited it to the Louisiana Territory) all the way to the Pacific were advocated for by William W. Wick, James Polk, and Stephen Douglas, at various points. (Modern state boundaries are shown for reference. Iowa was not a state until December 1846 and Texas's border was not defined this way until 1850.)

William W. Wick, Democrat of Indiana, attempted to eliminate total restriction of slavery by proposing an amendment that the Missouri Compromise line of latitude 36°30' simply be extended west to the Pacific. This was voted down 89–54. The vote to add the proviso to the bill was then called, and it passed by 83–64. A last-ditch effort by southerners to table the entire bill was defeated by 94–78, and then the entire bill was approved 85–80. These votes fell overwhelmingly along sectional rather than party lines.

The Senate took up the bill late in its Monday session. Southern Democrats hoped to reject the Wilmot Proviso and send the bill back to the House for a quick approval of the bill without the restrictions on slavery. Whig John Davis of Massachusetts attempted to forestall this effort by holding the floor until it would be too late to return the bill to the House, forcing the Senate to accept or reject the appropriation with the proviso intact. However, before he could call the vote, due to an eight-minute difference in the official House and Senate clocks, the House had adjourned and the Congress was officially out of session.

The issue resurfaced at the end of the year when Polk, in his annual message to Congress, renewed his request with the amount needed increasing to three million dollars. Polk argued that, while the original intent of the war had never been to acquire territory (a view hotly contested by his opponents), an honorable peace required territorial compensation to the United States. The Three Million Dollar Bill, as it was called, was the sole item of business in the House from February 8, 1847, until February 15. Preston King reintroduced the Wilmot Proviso, but this time the exclusion of slavery was expanded beyond merely the Mexican territory to include "any territory on the continent of America which shall hereafter be acquired". This time Representative Stephen Douglas, Democrat of Illinois, reintroduced the proposal to simply extend the Missouri Compromise line to the west coast, and this was again defeated 109–82. The Three Million Dollar Bill with the proviso was then passed by the House 115–106. In the Senate, led by Thomas Hart Benton (Democrat), the bill was passed without the proviso. When the bill was returned to the House the Senate bill prevailed; every Northern Whig still supported the proviso, but 22 Northern Democrats voted with the South.

In 1848, the Treaty of Guadalupe Hidalgo ending the war was submitted to the Senate for approval. Douglas, now in the Senate, was among those who joined with the South to defeat an effort to attach the Wilmot Proviso to the treaty. In the prior year's debate in the House, Douglas had argued that all of the debate over slavery in the territories was premature; the time to deal with that issue was when the territory was actually organized by Congress. Lewis Cass (Democrat) in December 1847, in his famous letter to A. O. P. Nicholson in Tennessee, further underlined the principle of appealing to popular sovereignty which would soon evolve as the mainstream Democratic alternative to the Wilmot Proviso:

Leave it to the people, who will be affected by this question to adjust it upon their own responsibility, and in their own manner, and we shall render another tribute to the original principles of our government, and furnish another for its permanence and prosperity.

== Aftermath ==
An animation showing the free/slave status of U.S. states and territories, 1789–1861, including the proposed Wilmot Proviso

With the approval of the treaty, the issue moved from one of abstraction to one involving practical matters. The nature of the Constitution, slavery, the value of free labor, political power, and ultimately political realignment were all involved in the debate. Historian Michael Morrison argues that from 1820 to 1846 a combination of "racism and veneration of the Union" had prevented a direct Northern attack on slavery. While the original Southern response to the Wilmot Proviso was measured, it soon became clear to the South that this long postponed attack on slavery had finally occurred. Rather than simply discuss the politics of the issue, historian William Freehling noted, "Most Southerners raged primarily because David Wilmot's holier-than-thou stance was so insulting."

In the North, the most immediate repercussions involved Martin Van Buren and the state of New York. The Barnburners were successfully opposed by their conservative opposition, the Hunkers, in their efforts to send a pro-proviso batch of delegates to the 1848 Democratic National Convention. The Barnburners held their own separate convention and sent their own slate of delegates to the convention in Baltimore. Both delegations were seated with the state's total votes split between them. When the convention rejected a pro-proviso plank and selected Lewis Cass as the nominee, the Barnburners again bolted and were the nucleus of forming the Free Soil Party. Historian Leonard Richards writes of these disaffected Democrats:

Overall, then, Southern Democrats during the 1840s lost the hard core of their original doughface support. No longer could they count on New England and New York Democrats to provide them with winning margins in the House. ...
To them [Free Soil Democrats] the movement to acquire Texas, and the fight over the Wilmot Proviso, marked the turning point, when aggressive slavemasters stole the heart and soul of the Democratic Party and began dictating the course of the nation's destiny.

Historian William Cooper presents the exactly opposite Southern perspective:

Southern Democrats, for whom slavery had always been central, had little difficulty in perceiving exactly what the proviso meant for them and their party. In the first place the mere existence of the proviso meant the sectional strains that had plagued the Whigs on Texas now beset the Democrats on expansion, the issue the Democrats themselves had chosen as their own. The proviso also announced to southerners that they had to face the challenge of certain northern Democrats who indicated their unwillingness to follow any longer the southern lead on slavery. That circumstance struck at the very roots of the southern conception of party. The southerners had always felt that their Northern colleagues must toe the southern line on all slavery-related issues.

In Alabama, with no available candidate sufficiently opposed to the proviso, William L. Yancey secured the adoption by the state Democratic convention of the so-called "Alabama Platform", which was endorsed by the legislatures of Alabama and Georgia and by Democratic state conventions in Florida and Virginia. The platform called for no federal restrictions of slavery in the territories, no restrictions on slavery by territorial governments until the point where they were drafting a state constitution in order to petition Congress for statehood, opposition to any candidates supporting either the proviso or popular sovereignty, and positive federal legislation overruling Mexican anti-slavery laws in the Mexican Cession. However, the same Democratic Convention that had refused to endorse the proviso also rejected incorporating the Yancey proposal into the national platform by a 216–36 vote. Unlike the Barnburner walkout, however, only Yancey and one other Alabama delegate left the convention. Yancey's efforts to stir up a third party movement in the state failed.

Southerner Whigs looked hopefully to slaveholder and war hero General Zachary Taylor as the solution to the widening sectional divide even though he took no public stance on the Wilmot Proviso. However, Taylor, once nominated and elected, showed that he had his own plans. Taylor hoped to create a new non-partisan coalition that would once again remove slavery from the national stage. He expected to be able to accomplish this by freezing slavery at its 1849 boundaries and by immediately bypassing the territory stage and creating two new states out of the Mexican Cession.

The opening salvo in a new level of sectional conflict occurred on December 13, 1848, when John G. Palfrey (Whig) of Massachusetts introduced a bill to abolish slavery in the District of Columbia. Throughout 1849 in the South "the rhetoric of resistance to the North escalated and spread". The potentially secessionist Nashville Convention was scheduled for June 1850. When President Taylor in his December 1849 message to Congress urged the admission of California as a free state, a state of crisis was further aggravated. Historian Allan Nevins sums up the situation which had been created by the Wilmot Proviso:

Thus the contest was joined on the central issue which was to dominate all American history for the next dozen years, the disposition of the Territories. Two sets of extremists had arisen: Northerners who demanded no new slave territories under any circumstances, and Southerners who demanded free entry for slavery into all territories, the penalty for denial to be secession. For the time being, moderates who hoped to find a way of compromise and to repress the underlying issue of slavery itself – its toleration or non-toleration by a great free Christian state – were overwhelmingly in the majority. But history showed that in crises of this sort the two sets of extremists were almost certain to grow in power, swallowing up more and more members of the conciliatory center.

Combined with other slavery-related issues, the Wilmot Proviso led to the Compromise of 1850, which helped buy another uncertain decade of peace. Radical secessionists were temporarily at bay as the Nashville Convention failed to endorse secession. Moderates rallied around the Compromise as the final solution to the sectional issues involving slavery and the territories. At the same time, however, the language of the Georgia Platform, widely accepted throughout the South, made it clear that the South's commitment to Union was not unqualified; they fully expected the North to adhere to their part of the agreement.

In regard to the territory the Proviso would have covered, California had a brief period of slavery due to slave owning settlers arriving during the 1848 California Gold Rush. Since there were no slave patrols or laws protecting slavery in the territory, slave escapes were quite common. Ultimately, California decided to ban slavery in their 1849 constitution and was admitted to the Union as a free state in 1850. Nevada would never have legal slavery and was admitted to the Union as a free state in 1864. The territories of Utah and New Mexico would have slavery from the time they were acquired by America in 1848 until July 1862, when the United States banned slavery in all federal territories. However, Utah had just 29 slaves (0.07% of the total population) and New Mexico had no slaves in the 1860 census.

== See also ==
- Slave Trade Acts
- Proviso Township, Illinois, named for the Wilmot Proviso
- Wilmot, Wisconsin, named for the Wilmot Proviso

== Bibliography ==
- Berwanger, Eugene H. (1967). The Frontier Against Slavery: Western Anti-Negro Prejudice and the Slavery Extension Controversy. University of Illinois Press. ISBN 0-252-07056-9.
- Cooper, William J. Jr. (1978). The South and the Politics of Slavery 1828–1856. LSU Press. ISBN 0-8071-0775-1.
- Earle, Jonathan H. (2004). Jacksonian Antislavery & the Politics of Free Soil, 1824–1854. University of North Carolina Press. ISBN 0-8078-2888-2.
- Foner, Eric (1970). Free Soil, Free Labor, Free Men: The Ideology of the Republican Party Before the Civil War. Oxford University Press. ISBN 0-19-509981-8.
- Freehling, William W. (1990). The Road to Disunion: Secessionists at Bay 1776–1854. ISBN 0-19-505814-3.
- Holt, Michael F. (1978). The Political Crisis of the 1850s. Norton. ISBN 0-393-95370-X.
- Johnansen, Robert W. (1973). Stephen A. Douglas. University of Illinois Press. ISBN 0-252-06635-9.
- Levine, Bruce (1992). Half Slave and Half Free: The Roots of Civil War. Farrar, Straus and Giroux. ISBN 0-8090-5352-7.
- McKnight, Brian D. (2000). "Wilmot Proviso". In Heidler, David S.; Heidler, Jeanne T. (eds.). Encyclopedia of the American Civil War. W.W. Norton. ISBN 0-393-04758-X.
- Morrison, Michael A. (1997). Slavery and the American West: The Eclipse of Manifest Destiny and the Coming of the Civil War. University of North Carolina Press. ISBN 0-8078-2319-8.
- Nevins, Allan (1947). Ordeal of the Union: Fruits of Manifest Destiny 1847–1852. New York, Scribner.
- Niven, John (1988). John C. Calhoun and the Price of Union: A Biography. Louisiana State University Press. ISBN 0-8071-1451-0.
- Potter, David M. (1976). The Impending Crisis 1848–1861. Harper Collins. ISBN 0-06-131929-5.
- Richards, Leonard L. (2000). The Slave Power and Southern Domination 1780–1860. Louisiana State University Press. ISBN 0-8071-2537-7.
- Silbey, Joel H. (2005). Storm over Texas: The Annexation Controversy and the Road to the Civil War. Oxford University Press, USA. ISBN 0-19-513944-5.
- Walther, Eric H. (2006). William Lowndes Yancey: The Coming of the Civil War. Univ of North Carolina Press. ISBN 0-8078-3027-5.
