= Southern Rights Party =

Political party in the United States

- Leader: George Troup; John A. Quitman
- Founded: 1850
- Dissolved: c.1854
- Preceded by: Democratic Party; Whig Party (state rights faction)
- Succeeded by: Democratic Party
- Ideology: States' rights Pro-slavery expansion
- House of Representatives (1851): 3 / 233 (peak)

The Southern Rights Party, briefly known as the Resistance Party in the state of Georgia, was a political party in the United States organized in several slave states to oppose the Compromise of 1850, viewing it as inadequate protection for the South, and advocate for secession from the Union, though it later abandoned serious plans for secession. It was one of two major parties in the states of Alabama, Georgia, and Mississippi in the early 1850s, alongside the Union Party. The party was made up of mostly Democrats and State Rights Whigs. By 1851, most Southern Rights Democrats had acquiesced to the compromise, believing further opposition to it was hopeless. In the 1851 house elections, Southern Rights Party candidates won three seats.

In 1861, in Kentucky, secessionists called themselves the Southern Rights Party and ran candidates in the 1861 house elections, winning a single seat. That congressman, Henry Cornelius Burnett, was later expelled from congress for supporting the Confederate rebellion.

== 1852 presidential election ==
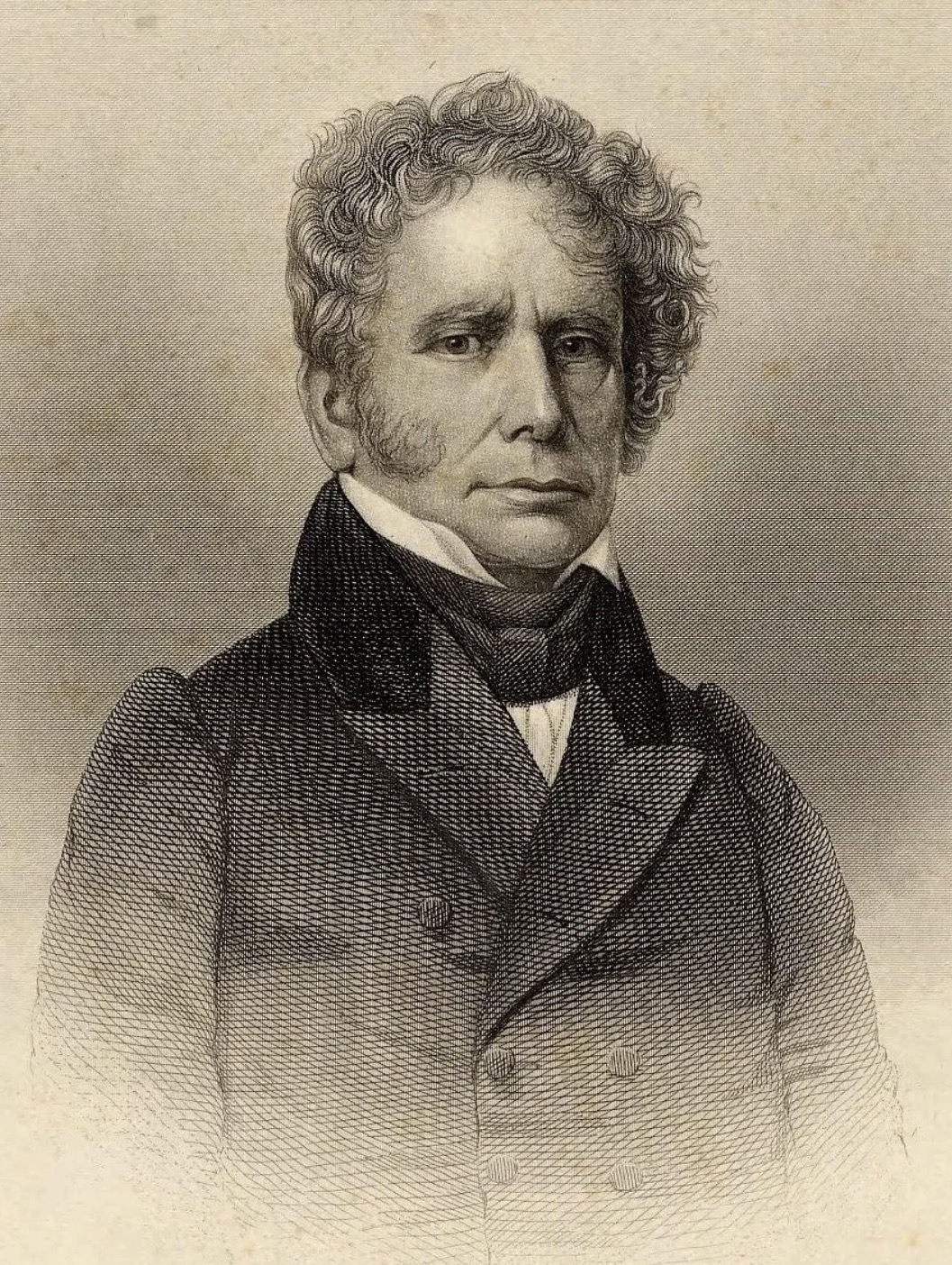
Former senator George Troup of Georgia

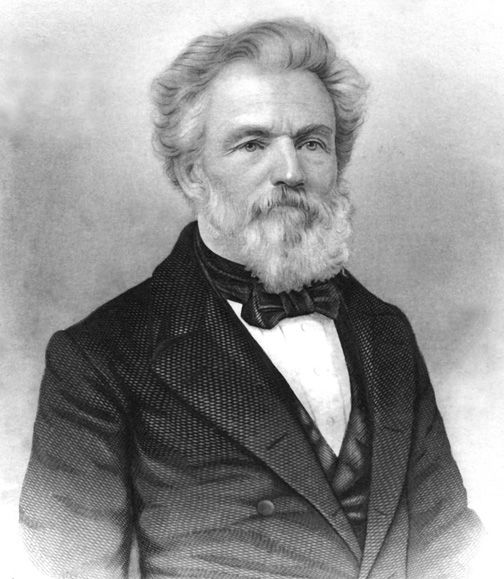
Former governor John Quitman
of Mississippi

The Southern Rights Party was an offshoot of the Democratic Party in several Southern states which advocated secession from the Union, electing a number of Congressmen and holding referendums on secession in a number of southern states, none of which were successful.

It was unclear in early 1852 if the Party would contest the presidential election. When the Alabama state convention was held in early March, only nine counties were represented. The party decided to see who was nominated by the two major national parties and support one of them if possible. When Georgia held its state convention, it acted as the state Democratic Party and sent delegates to the national convention.

After the Democratic National Convention, the Party was not sure that it wanted to support Franklin Pierce and William R. King, the Democratic nominees. Alabama held a state convention from July 13–15 and discussed at length the options of running a separate ticket or supporting Pierce and King. The convention was unable to arrive at a decision, deciding to appoint a committee to review the positions of Scott/Graham and Pierce/King with the option of calling a "national" convention if the two major-party tickets appeared deficient. The committee took its time reviewing the positions of Pierce and Scott, finally deciding on August 25 to call a convention for a Southern Rights Party ticket.

The convention assembled in Montgomery, Alabama, with 62 delegates present, a committee to recommend a ticket being appointed while the delegates listened to speeches in the interim. The committee eventually recommended former senator George Troup of Georgia for president, and former governor John Quitman of Mississippi for vice president; they were unanimously nominated.

The two nominees accepted their nominations soon after the convention, which was held rather late in the season. Troup stated in a letter, dated September 27 and printed in the New York Times on October 16, that he had planned to vote for Pierce/King and had always wholeheartedly supported William R. D. King. He indicated in the letter that he preferred to decline the honor, as he was rather ill at the time and feared that he would die before the election. The Party's executive committee edited the letter to excise those portions which indicated that Troup preferred to decline, a fact which was revealed after the election.
