= National Register of Historic Places listings in Taliaferro County, Georgia =

This is a list of properties and districts in Taliaferro County, Georgia that are listed on the National Register of Historic Places (NRHP).

This National Park Service list is complete through NPS recent listings posted March 21, 2025.

== Current listings ==
	Name on the Register	Image	Date listed	Location	City or town	Description
1	Chapman-Steed House	Chapman-Steed House	October 22, 2002 (#02001218)	Broad St. 33°33′13″N 82°53′35″W	Crawfordville	
2	Colonsay Plantation		November 21, 1974 (#74000703)	ENE of Crawfordville off SR 908; 33°35′57″N 82°41′51″W	Crawfordville	
3	Crawfordville Historic District	Crawfordville Historic District	March 14, 2006 (#06000124)	Roughly centered on the downtown business district of Crawfordville; 33°33′30″N 82°48′10″W	Crawfordville	
4	Liberty Hall	Liberty Hall	May 13, 1970 (#70000216)	Alexander H. Stephens Memorial State Park; 33°33′28″N 82°53′45″W	Crawfordville	A National Historic Landmark and a Georgia state historic site
5	Locust Grove Cemetery	Locust Grove Cemetery	December 12, 2006 (#06001119)	Locust Grove Rd. SE; 33°32′32″N 82°46′32″W	Sharon	
6	A. H. Stephens Memorial State Park	A. H. Stephens Memorial State Park	June 22, 1995 (#95000764)	GA 22, N side 33°34′13″N 82°53′39″W	Crawfordville	A Georgia state historic site
7	Taliaferro County Courthouse	Taliaferro County Courthouse	September 18, 1980 (#80001242)	GA 12; 33°33′16″N 82°53′48″W	Crawfordville	
