= Liberty Hall (Crawfordville, Georgia) =

Historic house in Georgia, United States

- U.S. National Register of Historic Places
- U.S. National Historic Landmark
- U.S. Historic district – Contributing property
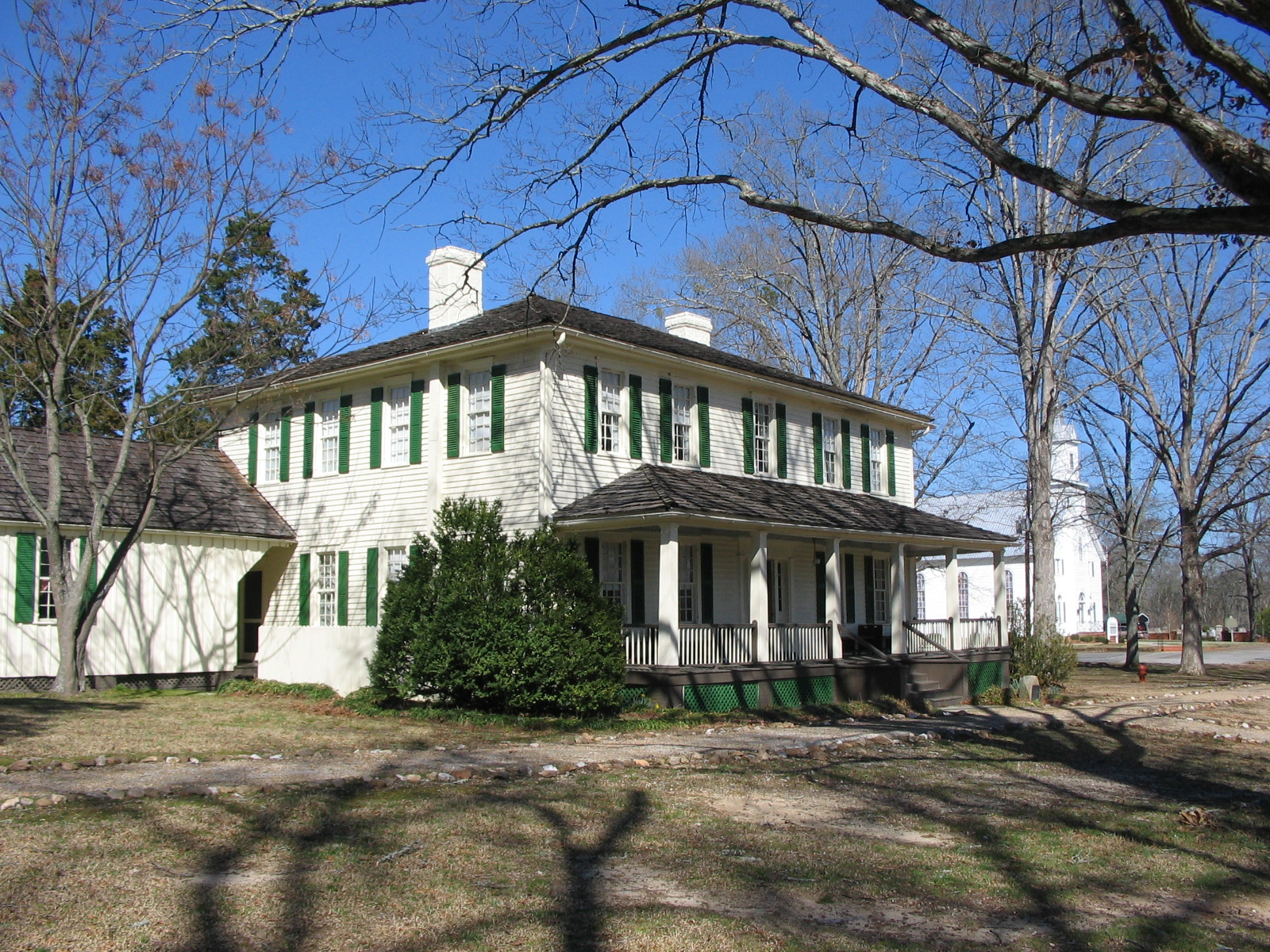
- Liberty Hall in Crawfordville, Georgia

- Location within Georgia Location within the United States
- Location: Crawfordville, Georgia
- Coordinates: 33°33′28″N 82°53′45″W
- Area: 7 acres (2.8 ha)
- Built: 1834
- Part of: A. H. Stephens Memorial State Park (ID95000764)
- NRHP reference No.: 70000216

Significant dates
- Added to NRHP: May 13, 1970
- Designated NHL: May 4, 1983
- Designated CP: June 22, 1995

Liberty Hall is a historic house museum in Crawfordville, Taliaferro County, Georgia, in the eastern Georgia Piedmont. It was the home of Alexander H. Stephens, a prominent Georgia political figure who was a member of the U.S. House of Representatives (1843–1853), Vice President of the Confederate States of America (1861–1865), and after the end of the American Civil War, a member of the U.S. House of Representatives again (1873–1882) and governor of Georgia (1882–1883). Stephens resided in the home from 1839 until his death in 1883. The home is now a museum and part of A. H. Stephens Historic Park, a Georgia state park maintained by the Georgia Department of Natural Resources and designated historic district. The larger A. H. Stephens Historic Park contains tent and trailer sites, picnic sites, and fishing ponds, as well as a nature trail and rustic cabins, and was mostly built by the Civilian Conservation Corps, beginning in 1933.

The structure was also known as Bachelor's Hall in 1859. The home was Stephens's "isolated haven," situated twenty miles away from Washington, Georgia.

== History and description ==
Stephens was born two miles north in a log cabin on his father's farm; he was orphaned at the age of fourteen. Stephens purchased the estate in 1845 from the estate of Williamson Byrd, a relative of his stepmother. The building was the former family home, but "had been sold out from under the brothers when their father died." In 1872–1875, Stephens tore down the old house, except for two rear rooms, and erected the current structure, which is restored to its original appearance. The home is a simple two-story white frame house. It has a hip roof and a veranda extending across its front. The first floor includes Stephens's bedroom, including original walnut furniture, a round table at which Stephens wrote, Stephens's wheelchair, a repaired original flowered ingrain carpet, and wallpaper with blue and gold stripes. The dining room includes "massive chairs" replicated from a single remaining original chair. To the rear is the library, where Stephens wrote from 1868 to 1870 his Constitutional View of the Late War between the States. Steps lead from the dining room to the second floor; at the top of the stairs is the "Tramps' Room," where many guests, including uninvited guests, often stayed. To the home's rear are restored outbuildings: slave quarters, a wine cellar, smokehouse, woodhouse, washhouse, and chickenhouse. At the time of emancipation in 1864, Stephens owned thirty-one slaves, most of whom remained with him after the war's end. It was at Liberty Hall that Stephens was captured by Union Army forces from a detachment of the 4th Iowa Cavalry, after which Stephens formally surrendered to General Emory Upton and was imprisoned before being released.

Stephens's constant companion at the home was a large, fluffy white dog named Rio. Many of Stephens's books are housed in a smaller structure behind, where he spent much of his time after the war. The home was known for its many guests from all walks of life, who were invited for meals with Stephens. After Stephens's death in office in 1883, his sitting room was preserved as he left it, and the hall passed to his surviving relatives. The home served as a boardinghouse until 1932, when it was donated to the State of Georgia.

Today, the house is renovated to its 1875 appearance. The home was added to the National Register of Historic Places on May 13, 1970, and was designated a National Historic Landmark on May 4, 1983.

== Images ==
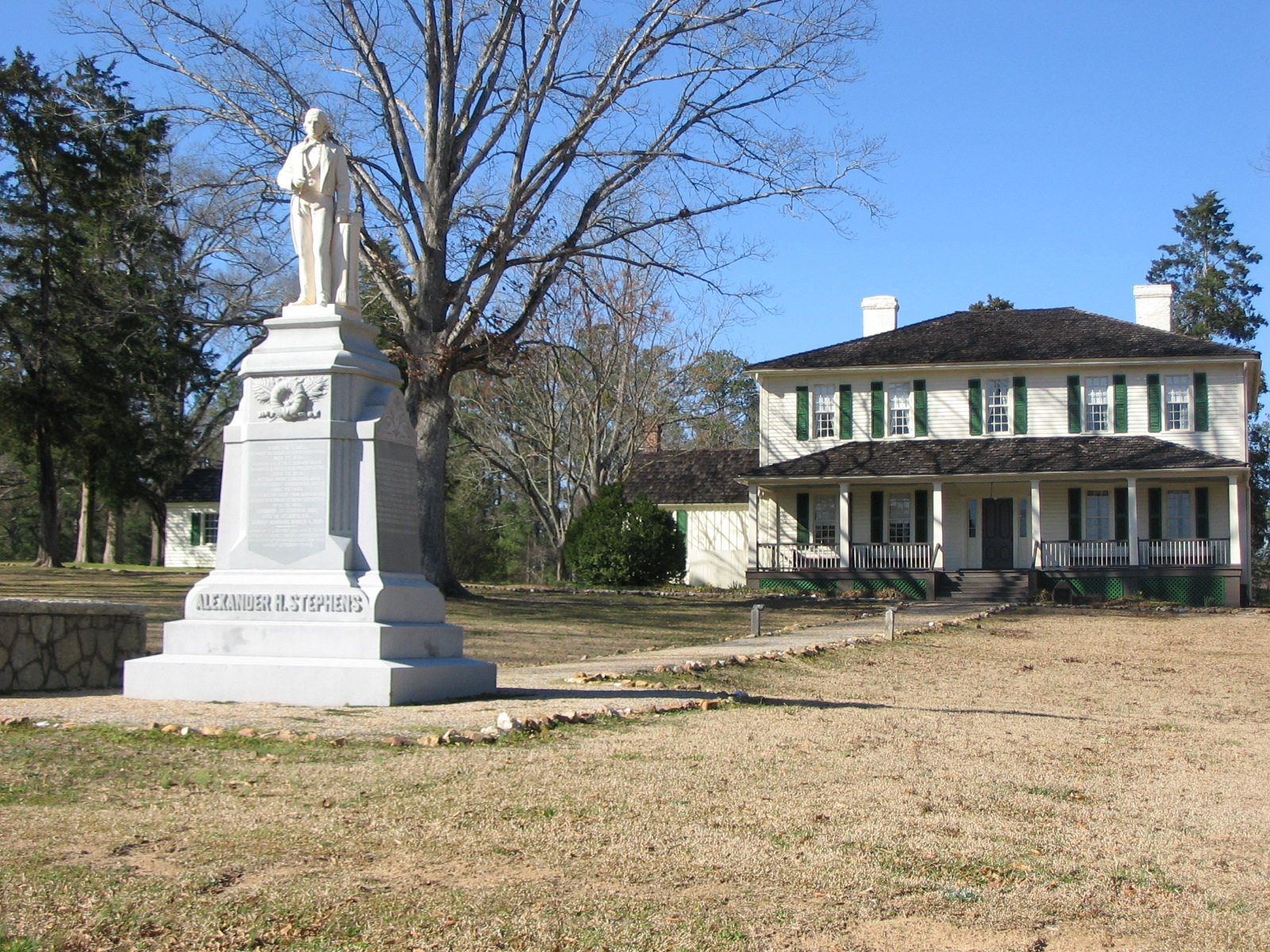
Alexander Stephens Memorial

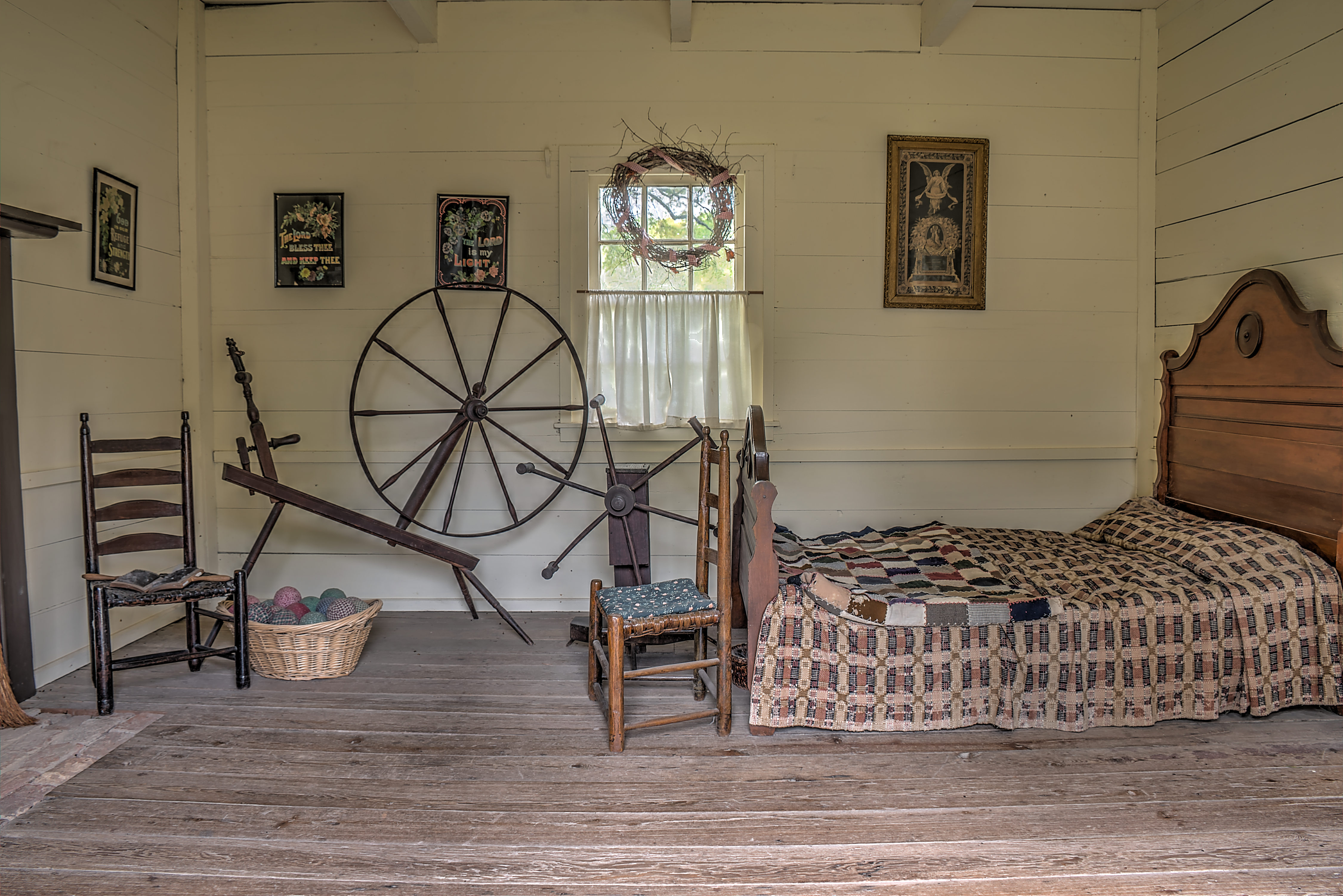
Slave Quarters

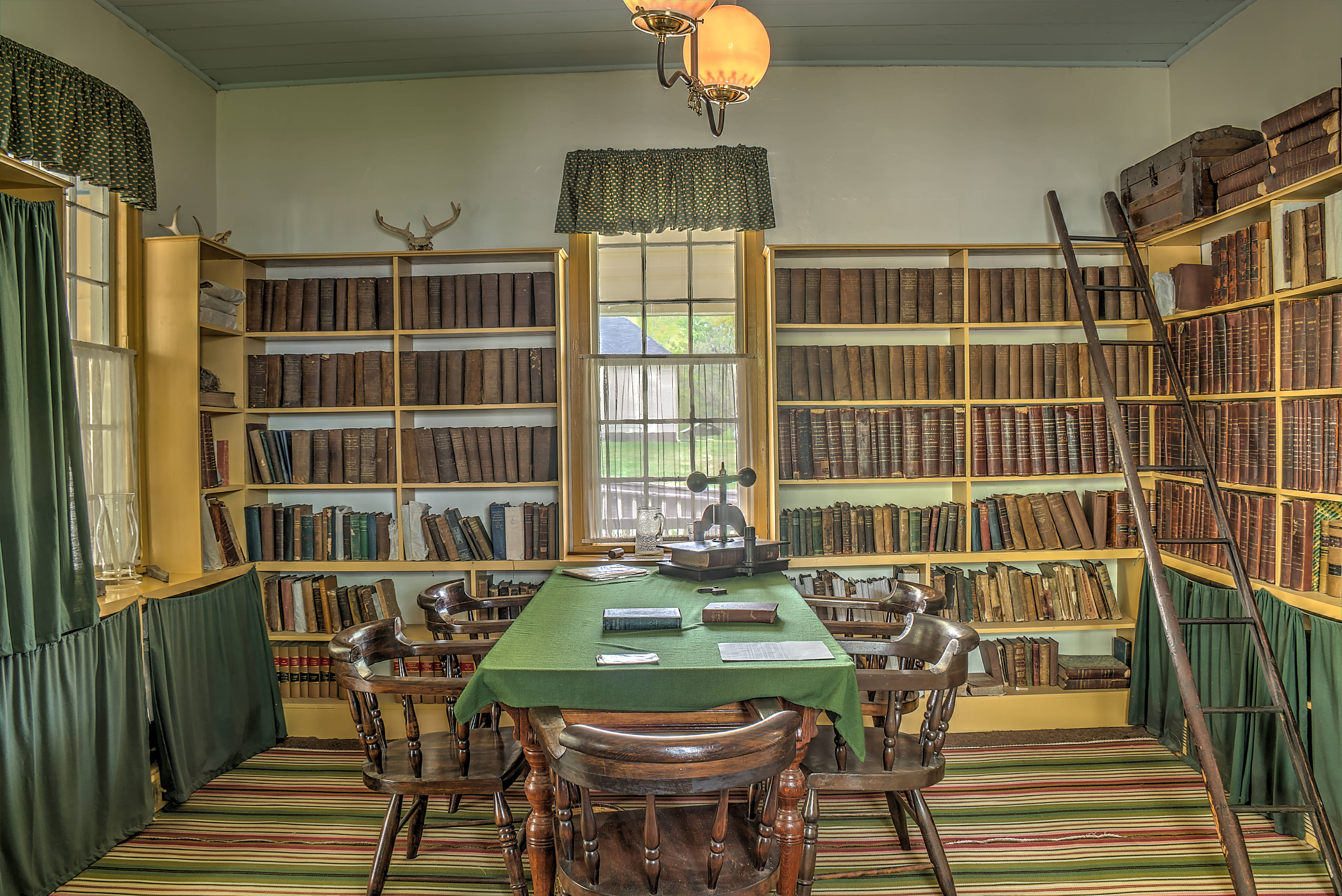
Library

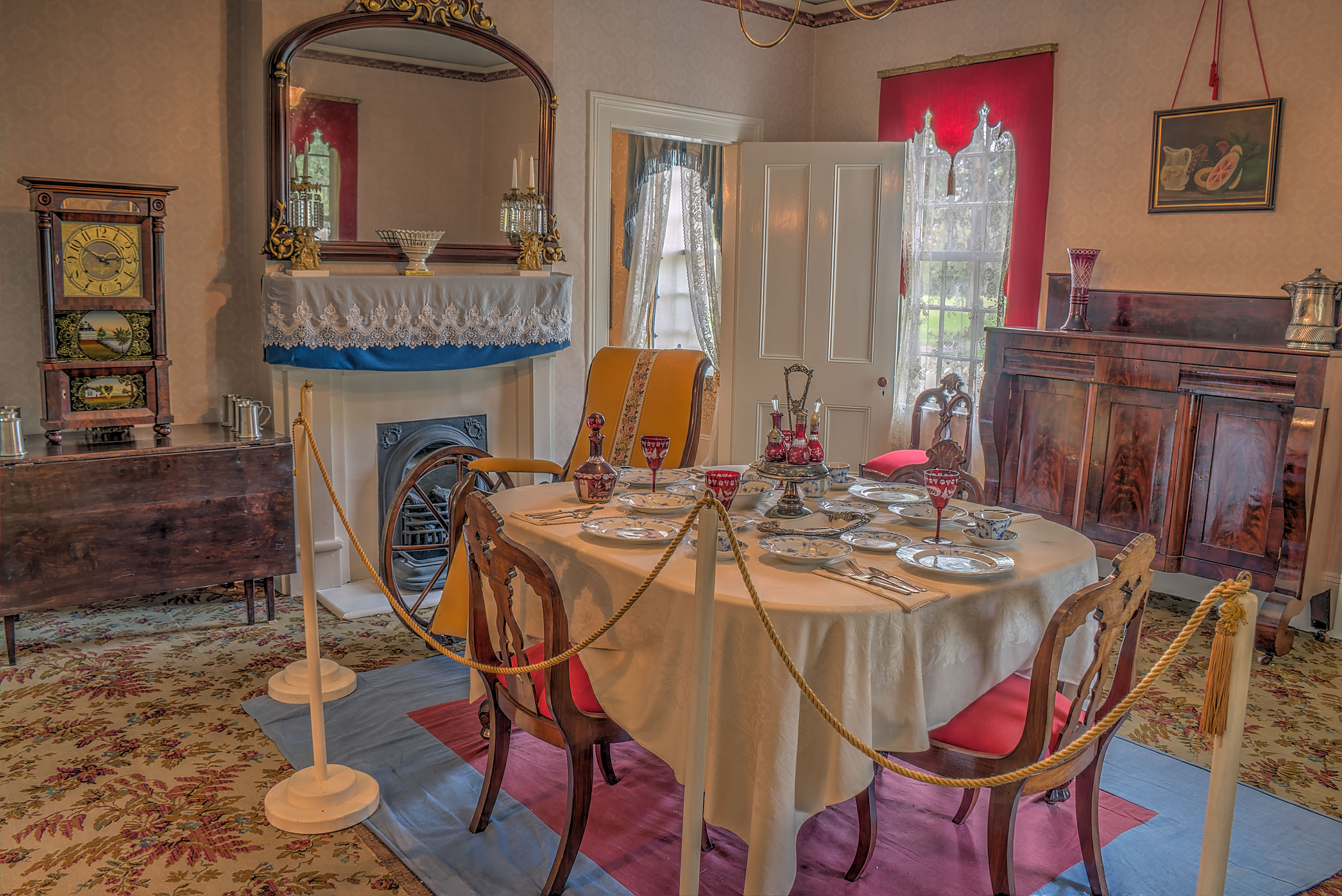
Dining Room

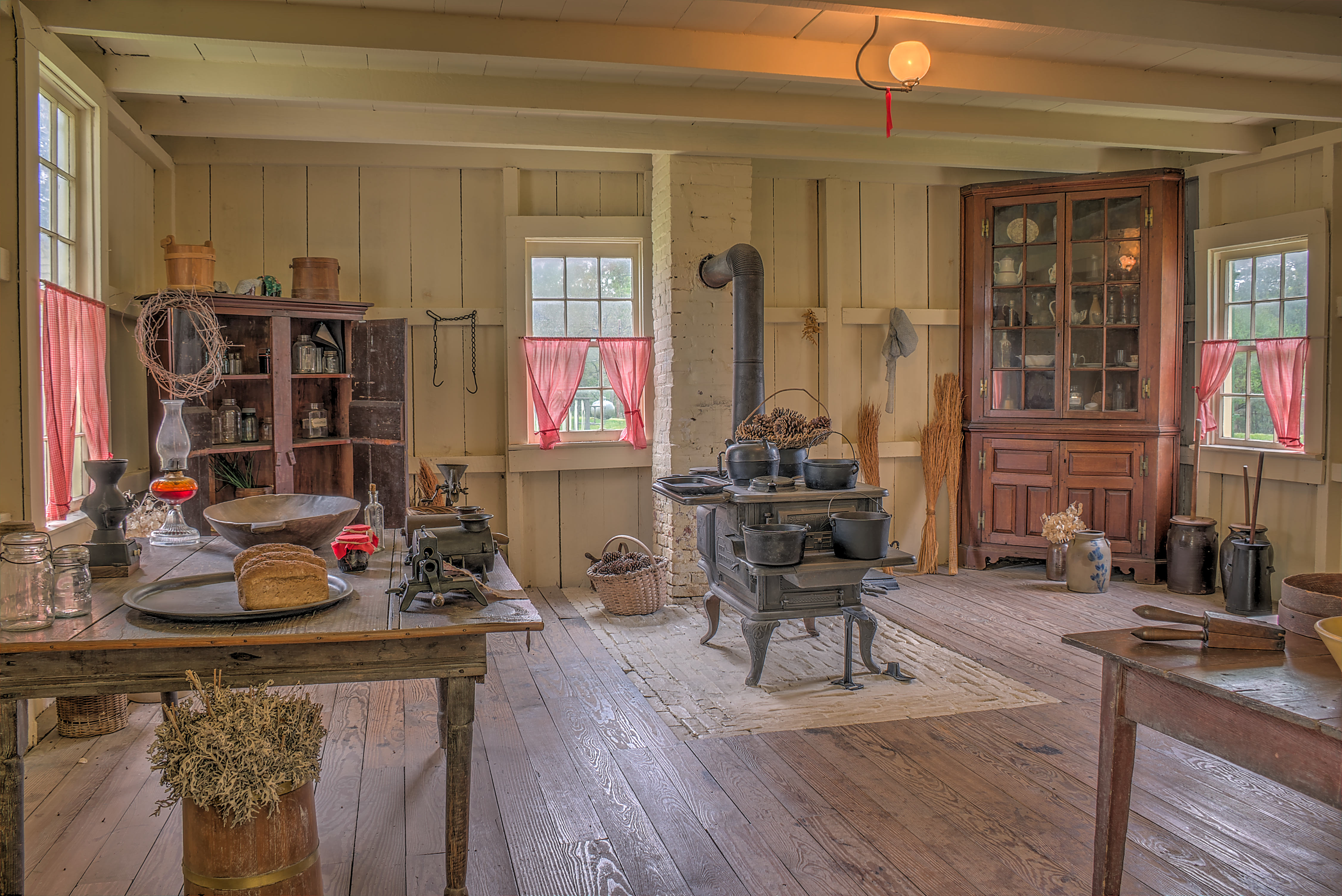
Kitchen

== See also ==
- List of Georgia state parks
- List of National Historic Landmarks in Georgia (U.S. state)
- National Register of Historic Places listings in Taliaferro County, Georgia
