= Linton Stephens =

American judge (1823–1872)

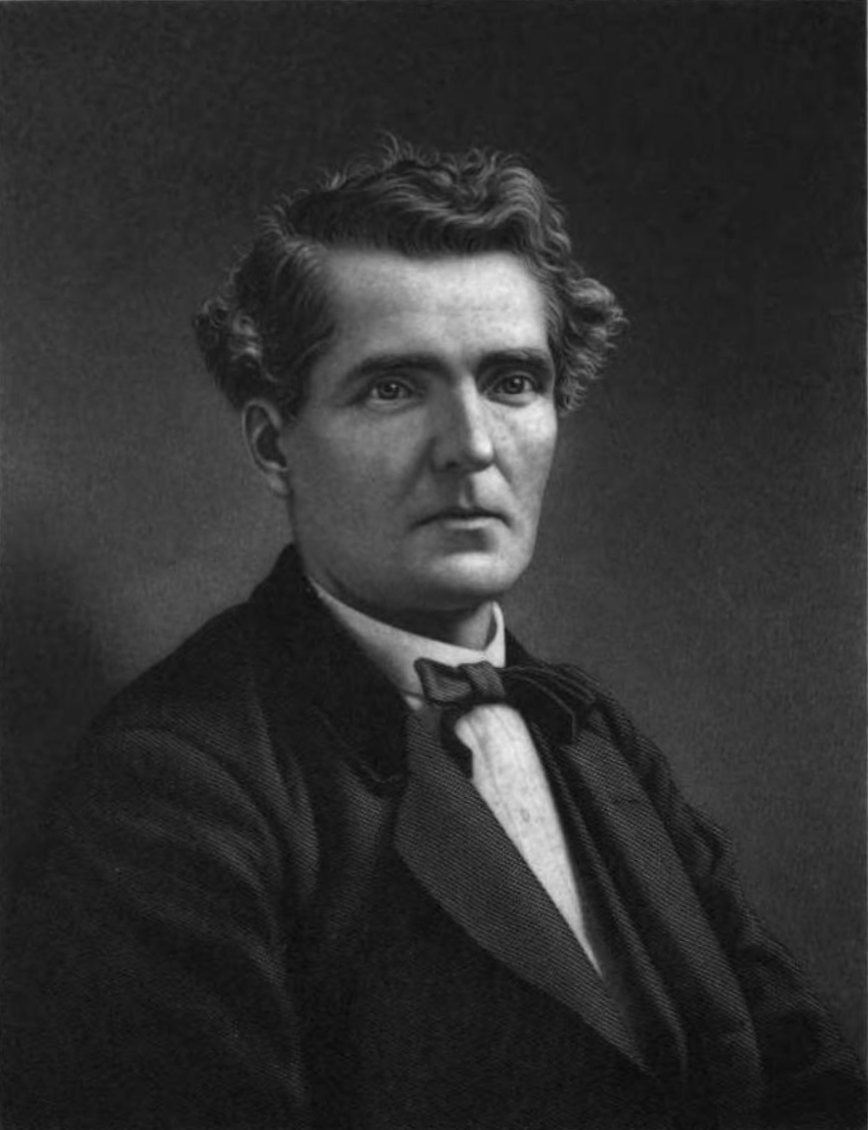
- Justice Linton Stephens

Justice of the Supreme Court of Georgia
- In office June 1859 – August 1860
- Preceded by: Charles James McDonald
- Succeeded by: Charles J. Jenkins

Personal details
- Born: July 1, 1823 Crawfordville, Georgia, U.S.
- Died: July 14, 1872 (aged 49) Sparta, Georgia, U.S.

Linton Stephens (July 1, 1823 – July 14, 1872) was a Georgia, US lawyer and politician who served as a justice of the Supreme Court of Georgia from 1859 to 1860.

== Biography ==
Stephens was the brother of Alexander H. Stephens. Their father died on May 7, 1826, and their mother died seven days later, leaving them orphaned before Stephens was three years old. Stephens had two siblings and two half-siblings; the family was broken up, with the children sent to live with kin on the side of their respective mothers. Stephens went to his grandmother and a maiden aunt on his mother's side, where he remained for nearly four years. In 1830, the administration of his father's estate was wound up, with each child receiving four hundred and forty-four dollars, equal to $13,110 today. Stephens was transferred to the guardianship of his uncle, John W. Lindsay of Upson County, Georgia. There Stephens first went to school. In 1836, he entered the academy at Culloden for a year only, and the following autumn, he was transferred to the guardianship of his brother, Alexander, in Crawfordville, Georgia.

Then and there it was "his youth awoke first and fully to the life of the mind" under the tutelage of Colonel Simpson Fouche, head of a large and excellent school at Crawfordville, where Stephens was prepared for admission to college.

Stephens graduated from Georgia State University in 1843, and then attended law lectures at the University of Virginia, thereafter moving to Cambridge, Massachusetts, to study under U.S. Supreme Court Justice Joseph Story until Story's death in 1845. Stephens then returned to Georgia, gaining admission to the bar in 1847, and entering the practice of law. Stephens "at once went into a lucrative practice". In June 1859, Governor Joseph E. Brown appointed Stephens to a seat on the Georgia Supreme Court vacated by the resignation of Charles James McDonald. Linton served for fourteen months, resigning in August 1860.

== Personal life and death ==
In 1852, Stephens married Emmeline Bell, widow of George Bell and daughter of Georgia judge James Thomas. Emmeline died in 1857, though Stephens afterwards remained close with Judge Thomas.

Stephens died of "congestion of the brain" at Sparta, Georgia, at the age of 49.

Political offices
| Preceded by Charles James McDonald | Justice of the Supreme Court of Georgia; 1859–1860 | Succeeded by Charles J. Jenkins |
