= Senator Cone =

Senator Cone may refer to:

- Francis H. Cone (1797–1859), Georgia State Senate
- Fred P. Cone (1871–1948), Florida State Senate
