= Taliaferro County School District =

School district in Georgia (U.S. state)

Address
- 557 Broad Street Crawfordville, Georgia, 30631-2918; United States
- Coordinates: 33.551048°N 82.879656°W

District information
- Grades: PK–12
- Superintendent: Allen Fort
- Accreditation(s): Southern Association of Colleges and Schools; Georgia Accrediting Commission

Students and staff
- Enrollment: 187 (2022–23)
- Faculty: 26.00 (FTE)

Other information
- Telephone: (706) 986-0396
- Fax: (706) 986-0507
- Website: taliaferro.k12.ga.us

The Taliaferro County School District is a public school district in Taliaferro County, Georgia, United States, based in Crawfordville. It serves the communities of Crawfordville and Sharon.

== Schools ==
The Taliaferro County School District has one charter school offering pre-school to grade twelve.

=== Charter school ===
- Taliaferro County Charter School
