= Alexander H. Stephens =

Vice President of the Confederate States from 1861 to 1865

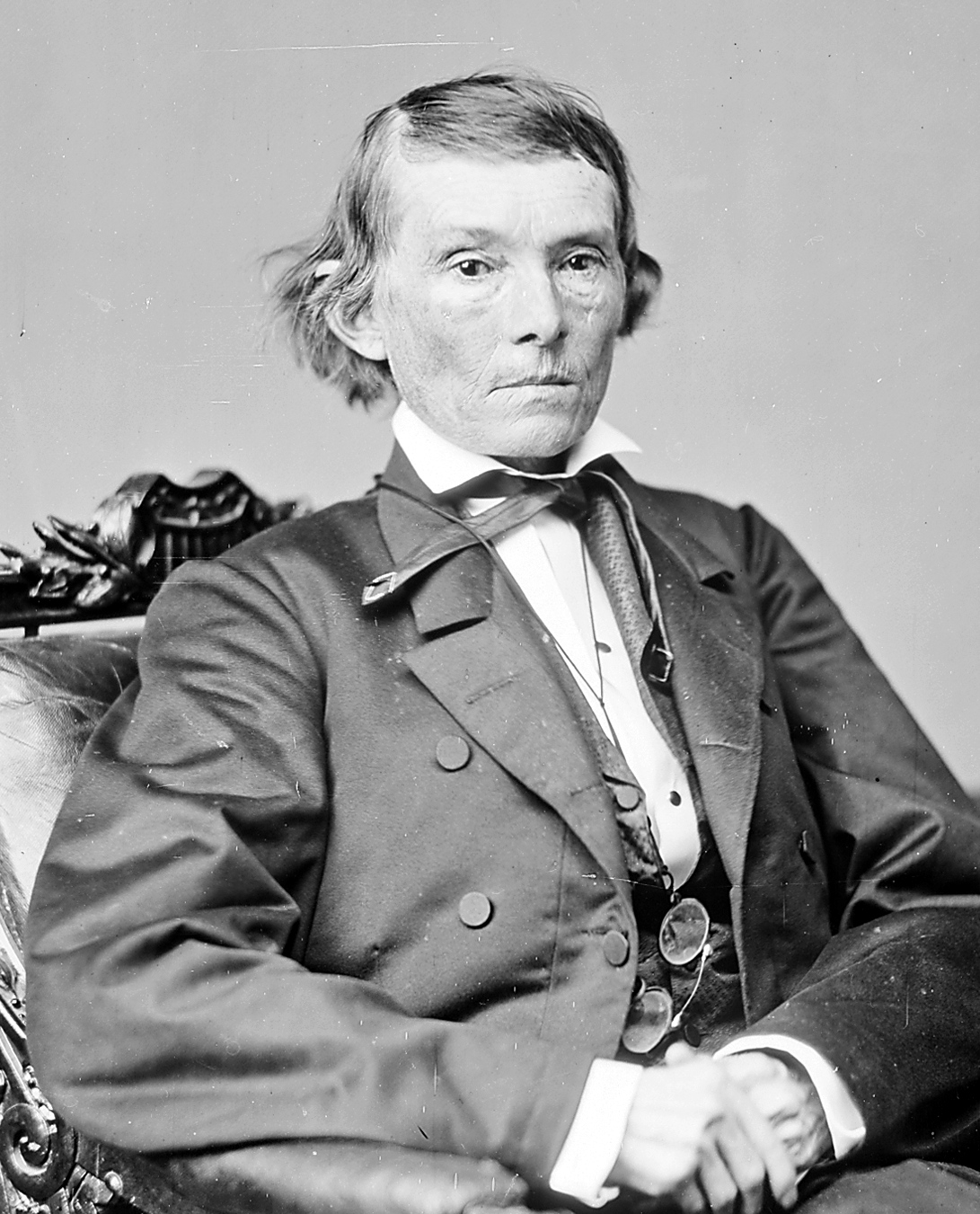
- Stephens in 1865

Vice President of the Confederate States
- In office February 22, 1862 (Note: Provisional: February 11, 1861 – February 22, 1862) – May 5, 1865
- President: Jefferson Davis
- Preceded by: Office established
- Succeeded by: Office abolished

50th Governor of Georgia
- In office November 4, 1882 – March 4, 1883
- Preceded by: Alfred H. Colquitt
- Succeeded by: James S. Boynton

Member of the U.S. House of Representatives from Georgia
- In office December 1, 1873 – November 4, 1882
- Preceded by: John James Jones
- Succeeded by: Seaborn Reese
- Constituency: 8th district
- In office October 2, 1843 – March 3, 1859
- Preceded by: Mark A. Cooper
- Succeeded by: John James Jones
- Constituency: At-large district (1843-45); 7th district (1845-53); 8th district (1853–59)

Member of the Confederate States Provisional Congress from Georgia
- In office February 4, 1861 – February 17, 1862
- Preceded by: Constituency established
- Succeeded by: Constituency abolished

Member of the Georgia Senate from the Taliaferro County district
- In office November 7, 1842 – December 27, 1842
- Preceded by: Singleton Harris
- Succeeded by: Abner Darden

Member of the Georgia House of Representatives from the Taliaferro County district
- In office November 7, 1836 – December 9, 1841

Personal details
- Born: Alexander H. Stephens (Note: Stephens' original middle name was the sole initial 'H'. It was filled to stand for 'Hamilton' in honor of Alexander Hamilton Webster, a childhood mentor.); February 11, 1812 Crawfordville, Georgia, U.S.
- Died: March 4, 1883 (aged 71) Atlanta, Georgia, U.S.
- Resting place: A. H. Stephens State Park
- Party: Whig (1836–1851, 1853-1855); Union (1851–1853); Democratic (1855–1861, 1865–1883)
- Education: University of Georgia (BA)

Alexander Hamilton Stephens (February 11, 1812 – March 4, 1883) was an American politician who was the only vice president of the Confederate States from 1861 to 1865, and later the 50th governor of Georgia from 1882 until his death in 1883. A member of the Democratic Party, he represented the state of Georgia in the United States House of Representatives before and after the Civil War.

Stephens attended Franklin College and established a legal practice in his hometown of Crawfordville, Georgia. After serving in both houses of the Georgia General Assembly, he was elected to the U.S. Congress, taking his seat in 1843. He became a leading Southern Whig and strongly opposed the Mexican–American War. After the war, Stephens was a prominent supporter of the Compromise of 1850 and helped draft the Georgia Platform, which opposed secession. A proponent of the expansion of slavery into the territories, Stephens also helped pass the Kansas–Nebraska Act. As the Whig Party collapsed in the 1850s, Stephens joined the Democratic Party and worked with President James Buchanan to admit Kansas as a state under the pro-slavery Lecompton Constitution (which was overwhelmingly rejected by Kansas voters in a referendum).

Stephens declined to seek re-election in 1858 but continued to publicly advocate against secession. After Georgia and other Southern states seceded and formed the Confederate States of America, Stephens was elected as the Confederate Vice President. On March 21, 1861, Stephens delivered his infamous Cornerstone Speech while visiting Savannah, Georgia, which defended slavery; enumerated contrasts between the American and Confederate foundings, ideologies, and constitutions; and laid out the Confederacy's rationale for seceding. Stephens would attempt to deny and retract this speech following the Confederacy's defeat in 1865. In the course of the war, he became increasingly critical of President Jefferson Davis's policies, especially Confederate conscription and the suspension of habeas corpus. In February 1865, he was one of the commissioners who met with Abraham Lincoln at the abortive Hampton Roads Conference to discuss peace terms.

After the war, Stephens was imprisoned until he was pardoned by President Andrew Johnson in October 1865. The following year, the Georgia legislature elected him to the U.S. Senate, but the Senate declined to seat him due to his role in the Civil War. He won election to the U.S. House of Representatives in 1873 and served until 1882, when he resigned from Congress to become governor of Georgia. Stephens served as governor until his death in 1883.

== Early life ==
Stephens as a young man

Alexander Stephens was born on February 11, 1812. His parents were Andrew Baskins Stephens, a teacher and schoolmaster, and Margaret Grier. Andrew, a native of Pennsylvania, came to Georgia at 12 years of age in 1795. According to the Biographical Sketch of Linton Stephens, Andrew B. Stephens was "endowed with uncommon intellectual faculties; he had sound practical judgment; he was a safe counselor, sagacious, self-reliant, candid and courageous." Margaret was a Georgia native and sister of Grier's Almanac founder Robert Grier. From both his parents, Alexander had a sister, Mary, and a brother, Aaron Grier. His half-siblings, from Andrew Stephens and Matilda Lindsay, were John, Linton, Catherine, Andrew and Benjamin; the latter two were stillborn. Alexander was named after his paternal grandfather. The Stephenses lived on a farm in Taliaferro County, near Crawfordville. At the time of Alexander Stephens's birth, the farm was part of Wilkes County. Taliaferro County was created in 1825 from land in Greene, Hancock, Oglethorpe, Warren, and Wilkes counties.

His mother died in 1812 at the age of 26; Alexander Stephens was only three months old. According to the introduction to Recollections of Alexander H. Stephens, "Margaret came of folk who had a liking for books, and a turn for law, war, and meteorology." The introduction continues: "In her son's character was a marked blending of parental traits. He [Alexander Stephens] was thrifty, generous, progressive; one of the best lawyers in the land; a reader and collector of books; a close observer of the weather, and father of the Weather Bureau of the United States." In 1814, Andrew B. Stephens married Matilda Lindsay, daughter of Revolutionary War Colonel John Lindsay. Alexander's relationship with Matilda was cold; he recalled being whipped by Matilda as a child, and his biographer Thomas Edwin Schott speculated that she thought he "was a bad boy". Alexander loved his father, on the other hand, and saw him as a role model despite his strictness. Alexander was physically weak but did chores around the family farm. From 1820 to 1824 his father gave him a formal education.

In May 1826, when Alexander was 14, his father and stepmother died of pneumonia only days apart. Alexander and Aaron were sent to live with their maternal uncle and aunt, General Aaron W. Grier and Elizabeth Grier, near Raytown (Taliaferro County), Georgia. Matilda's relatives received Alexander's half-siblings. Alexander inherited a female slave named Ebe from his father, who at the time of his death owned eight other slaves. General Grier had inherited his own father's library, said to be "the largest library in all that part of the country." Alexander Stephens, who read voraciously even as a youth, mentions the library in his "Recollections." Alexander and Aaron occasionally went to school in Locust Grove; they did not go full-time because the Griers gave them many chores in exchange for their stay.

== Education ==
In 1826 Stephens came to the attention of a Presbyterian minister (whom Schott denotes simply as Williams) who afforded him a term at a Sunday school. The school's superintendent, Charles C. Mills, referred Stephens to Washington Academy in Washington, Georgia, in 1827. There, Stephens met Presbyterian minister Alexander Hamilton Webster, who became his mentor and close friend. Stephens took Webster's middle name, Hamilton, after "learning Webster's full name from the cover of a book". Webster thought that Stephens's character was ideal for the ministry, but Stephens rejected the offer. After Webster died, Stephens made plans to leave the school, but received assistance and accommodation from Webster's friend Adam L. Alexander, as well as some local families. Thus he stayed until June of 1828.

Stephens enrolled in Franklin College (later the University of Georgia) in Athens, Georgia in August of that same year. The admissions examiner quizzed him about Cicero, whom he had not studied on, but Stephens passed anyway by impressing the examiner with a reading of an excerpt about capital punishment (with which Stephens was more familiar). At Franklin, he was a roommate of Crawford W. Long and a member of the Phi Kappa Literary Society. He got along with his peers and professors, the former of whom often visited his dormitory like a "resort" at which to have conversations with him. He raised funds for Phi Kappa Hall, located on the university campus. His time practicing rhetoric and oratory at Franklin sparked his interest in politics. Stephens graduated at the top of his class in August of 1832.

== Early career ==
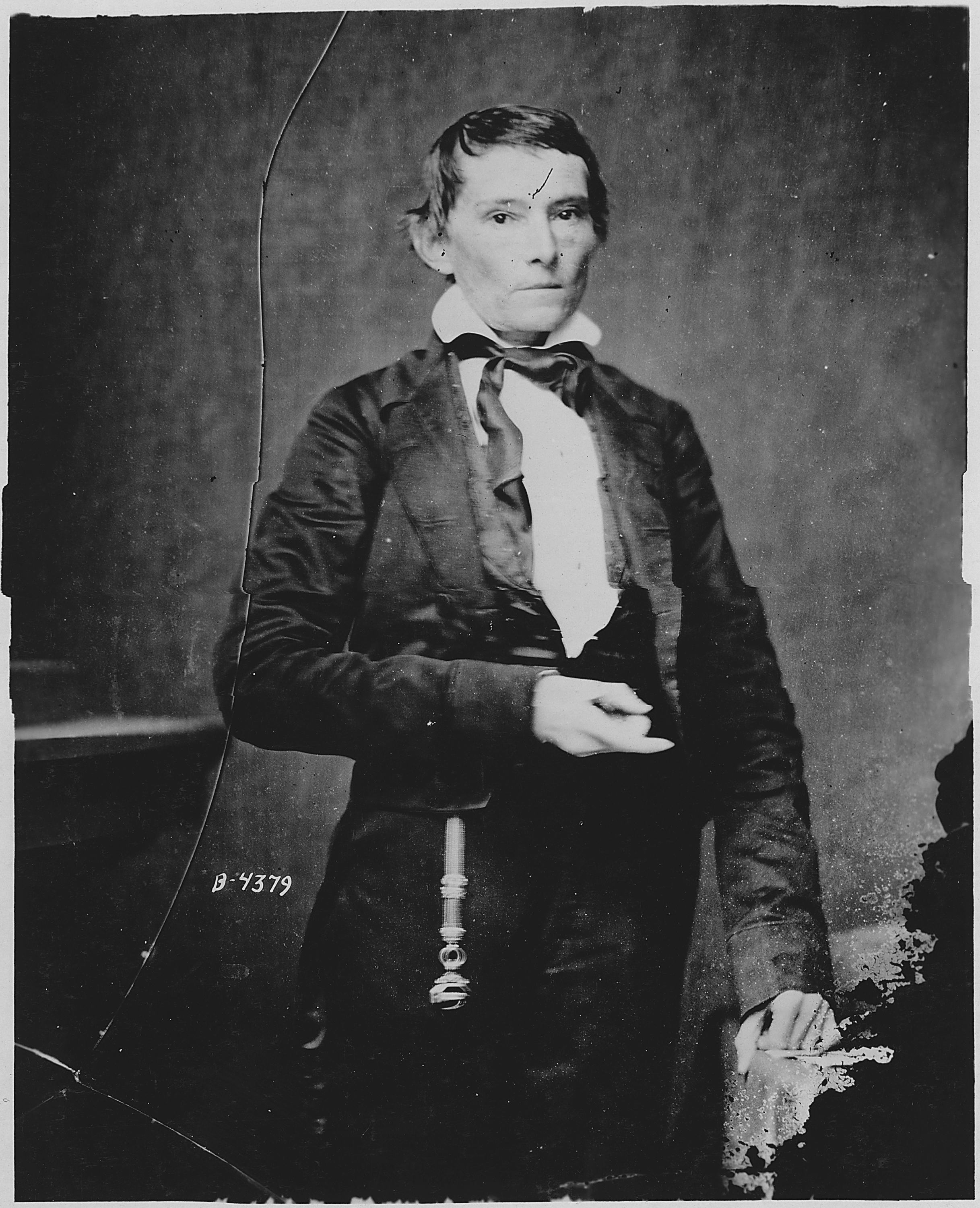
Photograph by Mathew Brady

Stephens found work, immediately after his graduation, as a schoolteacher in Madison, Morgan County. He was, according to Schott, a highly competent teacher who "secured perfect order in his half of the class" by means including corporal punishment. However, he found the job miserable, for he thought a career of teaching to be below himself, and quit in November of 1832. From then to January 1834, he was a tutor for Louis LeConte's children in Liberty County. Stephens began legal studies, was admitted to the Georgia bar in 1834, and began a successful career as a lawyer in Crawfordville. During his 32 years of practice, he gained a reputation as a capable defender of the wrongfully accused. None of his clients charged with capital crimes were executed. As his wealth increased, Stephens began acquiring land and slaves. By the time of the Civil War, Stephens owned 34 slaves and several thousand acres. He entered politics in 1836 and was elected to the Georgia House of Representatives, serving there until 1841. In 1842, he was elected to the Georgia Senate.

Stephens served in the U.S. House of Representatives from October 2, 1843, to March 3, 1859, during the 28th through the 35th Congresses. In 1843, he was elected to the House as a Whig, in a special election to fill the vacancy caused by the resignation of Mark A. Cooper. This seat was at-large, as Georgia did not have U.S. House Districts until the following year. Stephens was re-elected from the 7th District as a Whig in 1844, 1846, and 1848, as a Unionist in 1851, and again as a Whig (from the 8th District) in 1853. In 1855 and 1857 his re-elections came as a Democrat. As a national lawmaker during the crucial decades before the Civil War, Stephens was involved in all of the major sectional battles. He began as a moderate defender of slavery but later accepted the prevailing Southern rationale utilized to defend the institution.

Stephens quickly rose to prominence as one of the leading Southern Whigs in the House. He supported the annexation of Texas in 1845. Along with his fellow Whigs, he vehemently opposed the Mexican–American War, and later became an equally vigorous opponent of the Wilmot Proviso, which would have barred the extension of slavery into territories that were acquired after the war. He also controversially tabled the Clayton Compromise, which would have excluded slavery from the Oregon Territory and left the issue of slavery in New Mexico and California to the U.S. Supreme Court. This would later nearly kill Stephens when he argued with Georgia Supreme Court Justice Francis H. Cone, who stabbed him repeatedly in a fit of anger. Stephens was physically outmatched by his larger assailant, but he remained defiant during the attack, refusing to recant his positions even at the cost of his life. Only the intervention of others saved him. Stephens's wounds were serious, and he returned home to Crawfordville to recover. He and Cone reconciled before Cone's death in 1859.

Stephens and fellow Georgia Representative Robert Toombs campaigned for the election of Zachary Taylor as president in 1848. Both were chagrined and angered when Taylor proved less than pliable on aspects of the Compromise of 1850. After Taylor supported the ratification of New Mexico's anti-slavery state constitution and threatened to send troops to defend it against Texas's territorial claims, Stephens published an open letter in the National Intelligencer calling for Taylor's impeachment, and he warned that if the United States were to fire the first shots against Texas it would lead to the Southern states to secede from the Union. Stephens and Toombs both supported said compromise between slave and free states, though they opposed the exclusion of slavery from the territories on the theory that such lands belonged to all of the people. The pair returned from the District of Columbia to Georgia to secure support for the measures at home. Both men were instrumental in drafting and approving the Georgia Platform, which rallied Unionists throughout the Deep South.

Stephens and Toombs were not only political allies but also lifelong friends. Stephens was described as "a highly sensitive young man of serious and joyless habits of consuming ambition, of poverty-fed pride, and of morbid preoccupation within self," a contrast to the "robust, wealthy, and convivial Toombs. But this strange camaraderie endured with singular accord throughout their lives."

By this time, Stephens had departed the ranks of the Whig party, whose Northern wing generally was not amenable to some Southern interests. Back in Georgia, Stephens, Toombs, and Democratic U.S. Representative Howell Cobb formed the Constitutional Union Party. The party overwhelmingly carried the state in the ensuing election, and, for the first time, Stephens returned to Congress no longer a Whig. Stephens spent the next few years as a Constitutional Unionist. He vigorously opposed the dissolution of the Constitutional Union Party as it began to crumble in 1851. Political realities soon forced the Union Democrats in the party to affiliate once more with the national party, and, by mid-1852, the combination of both Democrats and Whigs, which had formed a party behind the Compromise, had ended.

The sectional issue surged to the forefront again in 1854, when Senator Stephen A. Douglas from Illinois moved to organize the Nebraska Territory, all of which lay north of the Missouri Compromise line, in the Kansas–Nebraska Act. This legislation aroused fury in the North because it applied the popular sovereignty principle to the Territory, in violation of the Missouri Compromise. Had it not been for Stephens, the bill probably never would have passed in the House. He employed an obscure House rule to bring the bill to a vote. He later called this "the greatest glory of my life."

From this point on, Stephens voted with the Democrats. Until after 1855, Stephens could not properly be called a Democrat, and even then, he never officially declared it. In this move, Stephens broke irrevocably with many of his former Whig colleagues. When the Whig Party disintegrated after the election of 1852, some Whigs flocked to the short-lived Know-Nothing Party, but Stephens fiercely opposed the Know Nothings both for their secrecy and their anti-immigrant and anti-Catholic position.

Despite his late arrival in the Democratic Party, Stephens quickly rose through the ranks. He even served as President James Buchanan's floor manager in the House during the fruitless battle for the slave state Lecompton Constitution for Kansas Territory in 1857. He was instrumental in framing the failed English Bill after it became clear that Lecompton would not pass, in order to secure its approval.

Stephens did not seek re-election to Congress in 1858. As sectional peace eroded during the next two years, Stephens became increasingly critical of Southern extremists. Although virtually the entire South had spurned Douglas as a traitor to Southern rights because he had opposed the Lecompton Constitution and broken with Buchanan, Stephens remained on good terms with Douglas and even served as one of his presidential electors in the election of 1860.

On November 14, 1860, Stephens delivered a speech titled "The Assertions of a Secessionist." He said:

When I look around and see our prosperity in every thing, agriculture, commerce, art, science, and every department of education, physical and mental, as well as moral advancement, and our colleges, I think, in the face of such an exhibition, if we can, without the loss of power, or any essential right or interest, remain in the Union, it is our duty to ourselves and to posterity to—let us not too readily yield to this temptation—do so. Our first parents, the great progenitors of the human race, were not without a like temptation when in the garden of Eden. They were led to believe that their condition would be bettered—that their eyes would be opened—and that they would become as gods. They, in an evil hour, yielded—instead of becoming gods, they only saw their own nakedness. I look upon this country, with our institutions, as the Eden of the world, the paradise of the universe.

On the eve of the outbreak of the American Civil War, Stephens counseled delaying a military move against U.S.-held Fort Sumter and Fort Pickens so that the Confederacy could build up its forces and stockpile resources.

== Vice President of the Confederate States (1861-1865) ==
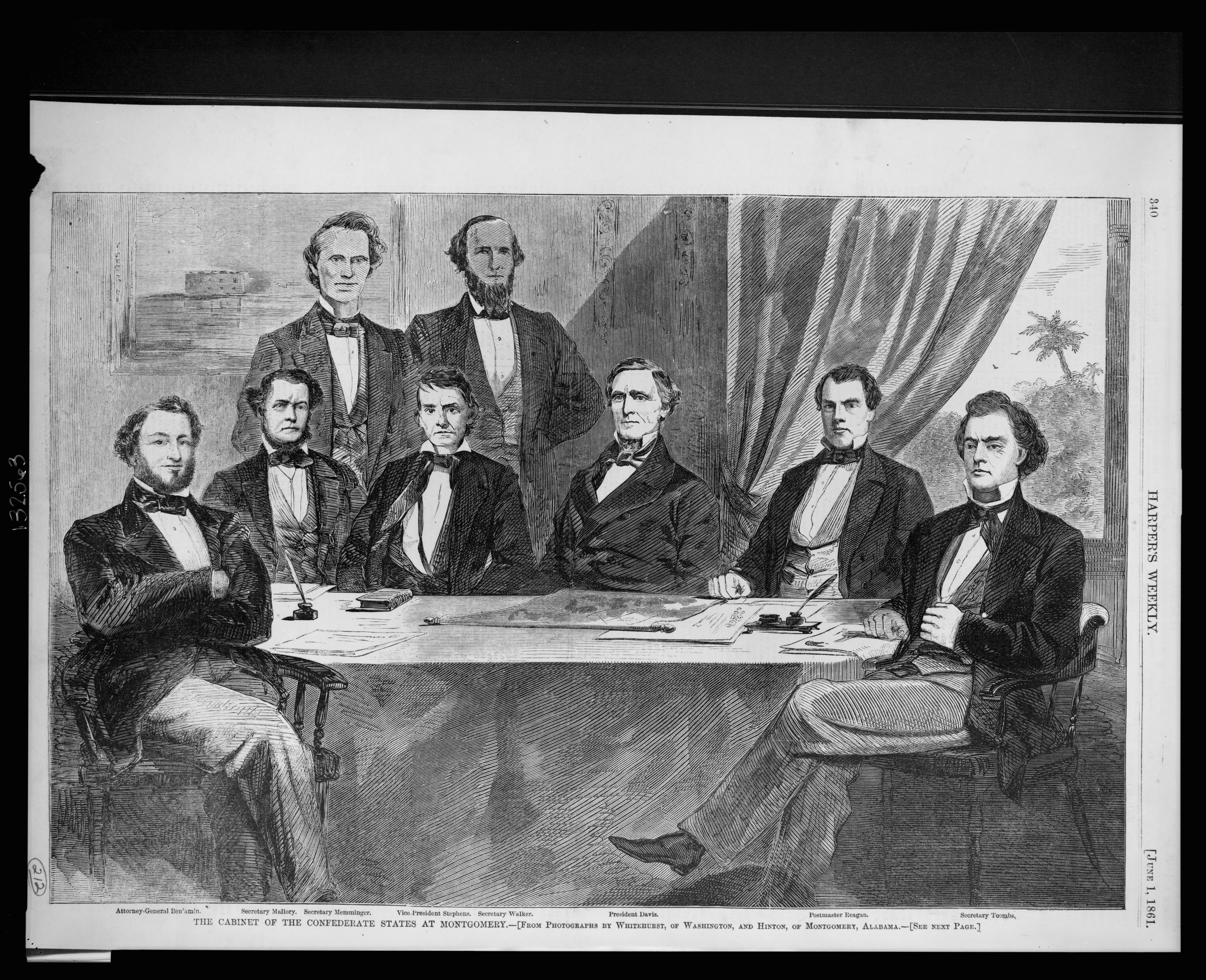
President Davis' first cabinet (1861)

In 1861, Stephens was elected as a delegate to the Georgia Secession Convention to decide Georgia's response to the election of Abraham Lincoln. During the convention, as well as during the 1860 presidential campaign, Stephens, who came to be known as the sage of Liberty Hall, called for the South to remain loyal to the Union, likening it to a leaking but fixable boat. During the convention, he reminded his fellow delegates that Republicans were a minority in Congress (especially in the Senate) and, even with a Republican president, they would be forced to compromise just as the two sections had for decades. Because the Supreme Court had voted 7–2 in the Dred Scott case, it would take decades of Senate-approved appointments to reverse it. He voted against secession in the convention but asserted the right to secede if the federal government continued allowing Northern states to nullify the Fugitive Slave Law with "personal liberty laws." He was elected to the Confederate Congress and was chosen by the Congress as vice president of the provisional government. He took the provisional oath of office on February 11, 1861, then the 'full term' oath of office on February 22, 1862 (after being elected in November 1861) and served until his arrest on May 11, 1865. Stephens officially served in office eight days longer than President Jefferson Davis; he took his oath seven days before Davis's inauguration and was captured the day after Davis.

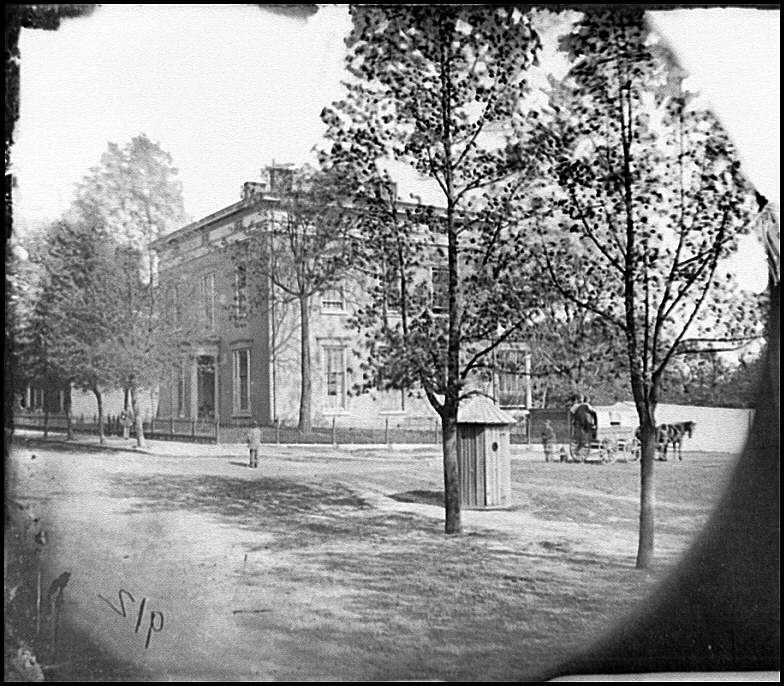
Stephens's house in Richmond

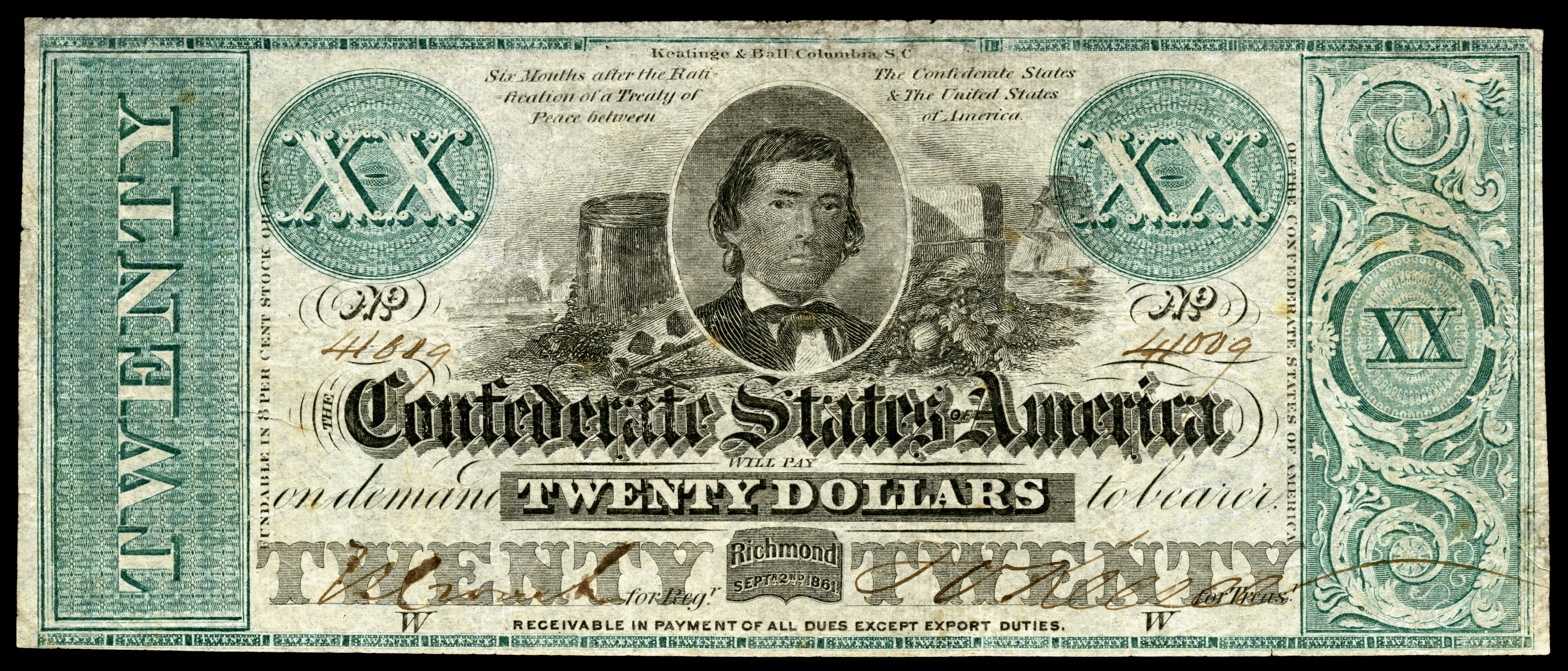
Stephens depicted on an 1862 Confederate States $20 banknote

In 1862, Stephens publicly expressed his opposition to the Davis administration for the first time. Throughout the war he denounced many of the president's policies, including conscription, suspension of the writ of habeas corpus, impressment, various financial and taxation policies, and Davis's military strategy. His objections were almost always on states' rights grounds. At some point, he stopped going to Richmond because he felt that his views were being entirely ignored. Away from the capital, he continued to criticize Davis, referring to him as a despot.

In mid-1863, Davis dispatched Stephens on a fruitless mission to Washington, D.C., to discuss prisoner exchanges, but the Union victory of Gettysburg made the Lincoln administration refuse to receive him. As the war continued and the fortunes of the Confederacy sank lower, Stephens became more outspoken in his opposition to the administration. On March 16, 1864, Stephens delivered a speech to the Georgia Legislature that was widely reported in both the North and the South. In it, he excoriated the Davis Administration for its support of conscription and the suspension of habeas corpus, and he supported a bloc of resolutions aimed at securing peace. From then until the end of the war, as he continued to press for actions aimed at bringing about peace, his relations with Davis, never warm to begin with, turned completely sour.

On February 3, 1865, Stephens was one of three Confederate commissioners who met with Lincoln on the steamer River Queen at the Hampton Roads Conference, a fruitless effort to discuss measures to bring an end to the fighting. Stephens and Lincoln had been close friends and Whig political allies in the 1840s. Although peace terms were not reached, Lincoln did agree to look into the whereabouts of Stephens's nephew, Confederate Lieutenant John A. Stephens. When Lincoln returned to Washington, he ordered the release of Lieutenant Stephens.

Stephens was arrested for treason against the United States at his home in Crawfordville on May 11, 1865. He was imprisoned at Fort Warren in Boston Harbor for five months, until October 1865.

=== Cornerstone Speech ===
The constitution, it is true, secured every essential guarantee to the institution while it should last, and hence no argument can be justly urged against the constitutional guarantees thus secured, because of the common sentiment of the day. Those ideas, however, were fundamentally wrong. They rested upon the assumption of the equality of races. This was an error. It was a sandy foundation, and the government built upon it fell when the "storm came and the wind blew."

Our new government is founded upon exactly the opposite idea; its foundations are laid, its corner- stone rests upon the great truth, that the negro is not equal to the white man; that slavery — subordination to the superior race — is his natural and normal condition. This, our new government, is the first, in the history of the world, based upon this great physical, philosophical, and moral truth.

— Alexander H. Stephens, segment from the Cornerstone Speech, defending slavery and laying out the Confederacy's rationale for seceding.

Stephens's Cornerstone Speech on March 21, 1861, to The Savannah Theatre, is frequently cited in historical analysis of Confederate ideology. The speech defended slavery; enumerated contrasts between the American and Confederate foundings, ideologies, and constitutions; and laid out the Confederacy's rationale for seceding. It has been described as the most significant speech ever delivered by Stephens. It declared that disagreements over the enslavement of Africans were the "immediate cause" of secession and that the Confederate constitution had resolved such issues.

Stephens contended in the speech that advances and progress in the sciences proved that the United States Declaration of Independence's view that "all men are created equal" was erroneous. His speech criticized "most of the leading statesmen at the time of the formation of the old Constitution" for their views on slavery. Stephens quoted the Psalm 118:22 and Curse of Ham to biblically justify the institution. Stephens concluded by saying; "This stone which was "rejected by the first builders" [Founding Fathers] " — is become the chief of the corner" — the real "corner-stone" in our new edifice."

After the Confederacy's defeat, Stephens attempted to retroactively deny and retract the opinions he had stated in the speech. Denying his earlier statements that slavery was the Confederacy's cause for leaving the Union, he contended to the contrary that he thought that the war was rooted in constitutional differences; this explanation by Stephens is widely rejected by historians. Hébert states that "the speech haunted Stephens to the grave and beyond as he and other postbellum southern Democrats struggled to conceal the clear meaning of his words under the camouflage of a Lost Cause mythology."

== Later career ==
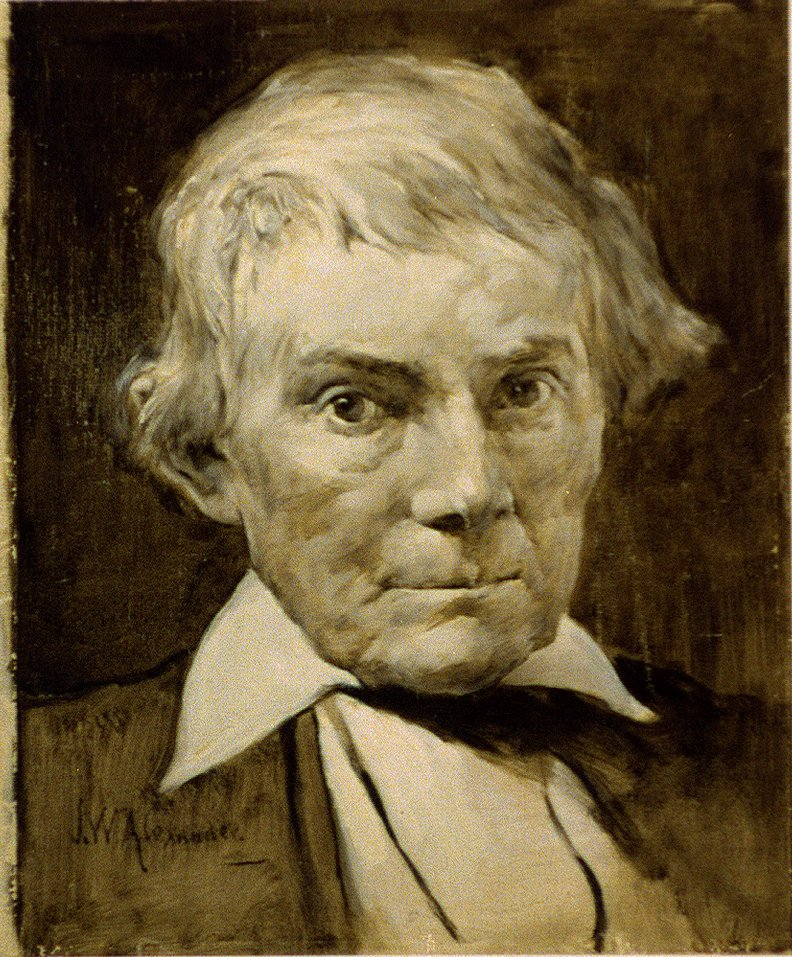
Alexander H. Stephens. Oil painting by John White Alexander. Published as cover of Harper's Weekly, 27:145 (March 10, 1883).

In 1866, Stephens was elected to the United States Senate by the first legislature convened under the new Georgia State Constitution, but was not allowed to take his seat because of restrictions on former Confederates. The thrust of his legal argument was rejected by the Supreme Court in the 1869 case Texas v. White, which ruled that secession was unconstitutional.

On the rights of African Americans after the Civil War, Stephens told President Andrew Johnson that if individual African Americans "could come up to some proper standard of mental and moral culture with . . . a specified amount of property" then they should be allowed to vote but only if their state allowed them to. Schott writes that "He of course believed in their inherent inferiority to whites. But unlike many of his fellow white southerners, he candidly admitted that to deprive this large population of any 'direct or indirect' voice in government 'would not only be an anomaly in Representative Government but would be manifestly wrong upon the principles of wisdom and justice.'" Stephens at first believed that the Ku Klux Klan only existed in Tennessee but found out that it existed in Georgia (U.S. state). Stephens did not support the Ku Klux Klan with Schott stating that "He revered the law too much to countenance the indiscriminate outrages masked thugs perpetrated on blacks and whites alike." When running for Governor of Georgia in 1882, Stephens stated that he would "stand by my race" and oppose "social or political advancement above the white race."

With the Civil War over and 4 million people no longer enslaved, Stephens was willing to concede African Americans having full property rights, the eventual right to hold office, and education as part of what he viewed as a white obligation to the formerly enslaved but also because this would ensure "the immemorial status quo between the races" as Schott points out with the "basic antebellum racial arrangement" staying the same. In 1866, Stephens gave a speech to the Georgia Assembly in which he called for "wise and humane treatment" of African Americans by giving them legal rights. The Georgia Assembly "followed Stephens' lead" by passing laws that "protected the freedmen's personal, property, and legal rights" with the expectation being that this would get Georgia "readmitted as a full-fledged member of the Union" although the state did not give black people the right to vote. Stephens supported the Reconstruction era policy of Andrew Johnson. Stephens did not support the Fourteenth Amendment to the United States Constitution but was supportive of earlier congressional legislation which granted all African Americans the right to vote but also gave all Confederates amnesty and Confederate debt was repudiated. Stephens believed that white southerners would be able to control the votes of African Americans, but the bill was vetoed by Johnson. Before a congressional committee on Reconstruction, Stephens stated that he was not opposed to black voting rights with restrictions in terms of his personal views but said only the states could decide suffrage. When asked about the responsibly of the federal government to protect people's rights Stephens replied by saying "Only such responsibility as the states would allow the federal government to have." In the 1872 United States presidential election, Stephens opposed the Democratic Party not campaigning against the Fourteenth Amendment to the United States Constitution and the Fifteenth Amendment to the United States Constitution. Unlike other southerners, he opposed the New Departure (United States) which focused on opposition to President Ulysses S. Grant and accepted the amendments.

Stephens was attacked by Democratic Party press because he supported President Ulysses S. Grant using federal troops in the state of Louisiana to reinstate William Pitt Kellogg as Republican governor after Kellogg had been violently deposed with Stephens saying "When thousands assemble, with arms in their hands, to subvert an existing government, even though oppressive in its character ... I am far from saying the movement was right" to a reporter. As a member of the House of Representatives, Stephens was the only Democrat who voted for a report by the Committee on Louisiana Affairs to advance to the floor of the house which meant recognizing the Republican government of Governor Kellogg. "Vainly did Stephens try to explain that his act also allowed formal condemnation of the corrupt Republican returning board in that state" with him thinking that both sides were guilty of fraud. He supported President Rutherford B. Hayes removing soldiers from the South in 1877 with Stephens stating that an African American "is nothing but a machine, an instrument in the hands of the politicians to vote as they want ... He is not to be taken into account in making up the estimate."

In 1873, Stephens was elected to the United States House of Representatives as a Democrat from the 8th District to fill the vacancy caused by the death of Ambrose R. Wright. He was re-elected to the 8th District as an Independent Democrat in 1874, 1876, and 1878, and as a Democrat again in 1880. He described himself, on the title page of the 1876 edition of his Compendium, as "Professor Elect of History and Political Science at the University of Georgia." He served in the 43rd through 47th Congresses, from December 1, 1873, until his resignation on November 4, 1882. On that date, he was elected and took office as governor of Georgia. His tenure as governor proved brief; Stephens died on March 4, 1883, four months after taking office.

== Personal life ==
Stephens, who had a disdain for and a "puritanical view" of sexuality, never married and never acknowledged descendants. An African American family claims to be the descendants of Stephens and a slave he owned, named Eliza, though their claims were not verified by genetic testing. Stephens was sickly throughout his life, most painfully from "crippling rheumatoid arthritis and a pinched nerve in his back." He also suffered from colitis, two or three separate instances of near-fatal pneumonia, bouts of angina, bladder stones, pruritis and migraine headaches. In his last decade, he developed a morphine addiction. Although his adult height was 5 feet 7 inches (1.70 m), he often weighed less than 100 pounds (45 kg). Almost all of his former slaves continued to work for him, often for little or no money; whether this decision was voluntary or the result of few other options existing for former slaves in the Deep South is difficult to determine. These servants were with him upon his death. Although old and infirm, Stephens continued to work on his house and plantation. According to a former slave, a gate fell on Stephens while he and another black servant were repairing it, "and he was crippled and lamed up from that time on till he died." The veracity of this rumor is difficult to determine as the cited ex-slave was not present when this happened.

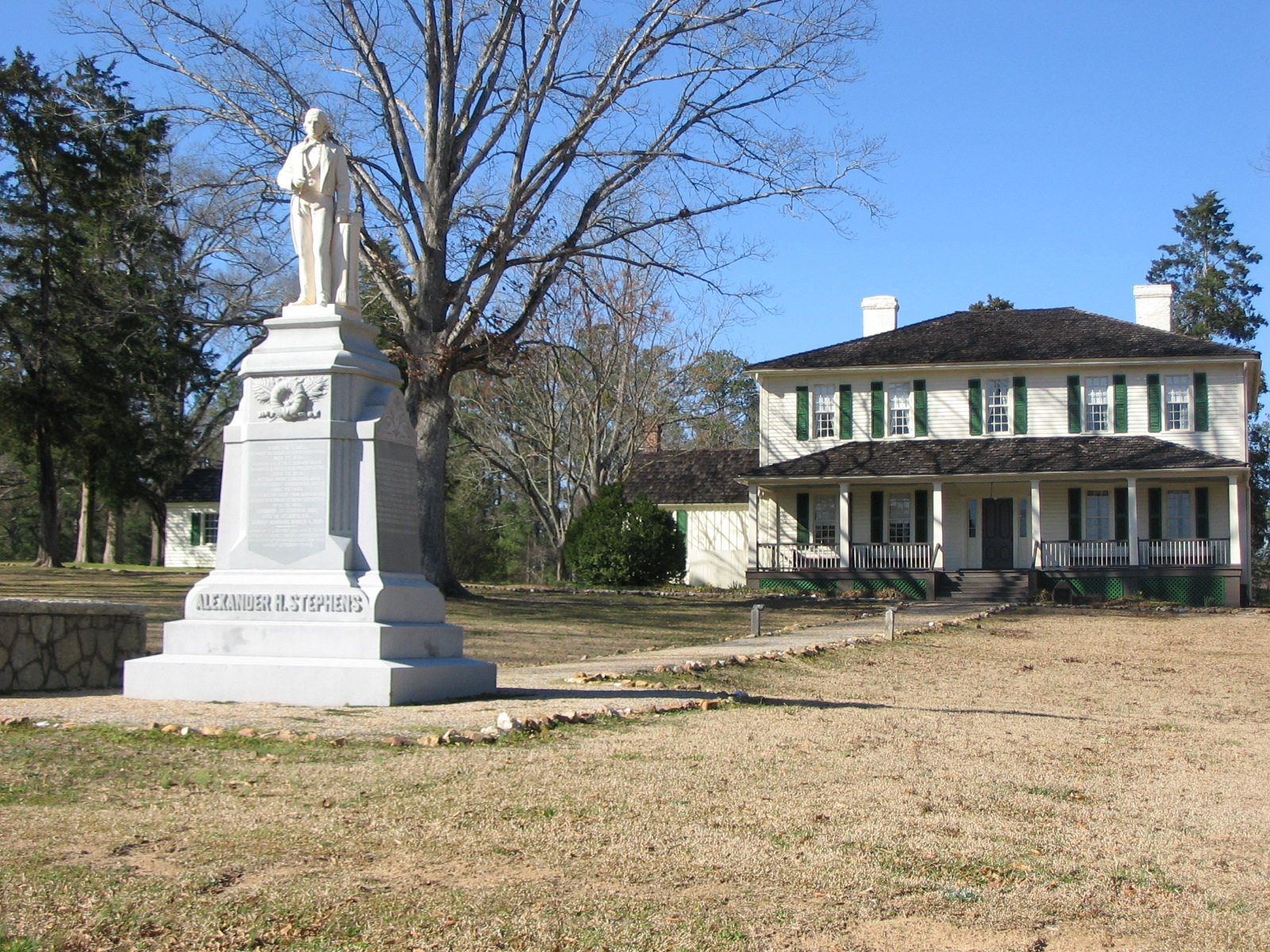
Alexander H. Stephens Monument in front of his house, Liberty Hall.

== Death and funeral ==
While returning from a trip to Savannah in February, his already poor health further deteriorated from exposure to the elements. His last official act as governor was executed on 28 February. He died shortly before 3:30 am on 4 March 1883, surrounded by physicians and friends. That afternoon, commemorative speeches were made by "prominent citizens" in the Georgia Senate chamber. On 6 March, Stephens' body lay in state in the chamber. On 8 March, a grand funeral was held, and all citizens of the state were requested to observe the occasion. The Stephens family cemetery, where his parents, brother and grandfather lay, was his desired place of burial, but he was instead interred at Liberty Hall.

In 1928, Judge Alex Stephens, a nephew, introduced Cyrus Stephens, the last surviving person who had been enslaved by Alexander Stephens, to Georgia governor L. G. Hardman.

== Works ==
=== Speeches ===
Alexander H. Stephens, in public and private : with letters and speeches, before, during, and since the war (1866)

- Speech of Mr. Stephens, of Georgia, on the subject of the Mexican War, delivered in the House of Representatives of the U.S., June 16, 1846. Washington, D.C.: J. & G.S. Gideon, printer. 1846.
- Stephens, Alexander Hamilton (1856). Speech of Hon. Alex. H. Stephens, of Georgia, on the Kansas Election, delivered in the House of Representatives, February 19, 1856.
- Speech of Hon. Alexander H. Stephens, of Georgia, on the admission of Minnesota and alien suffrage; delivered in the House of Representatives, May 11, 1858. Washington, D.C.: Printed at the Congressional Globe Office. 1858.
- Impeachment of Judge Watrous: Speech of Hon. Alexander H. Stephens of Georgia in the House of Representatives, December 15, 1858. Impeachment of Watrous. Printed at the Congressional Globe Office. 1858.
- Extract from a speech by Alexander H. Stephens, vice-president of the Confederate States,: delivered in the secession convention of Georgia, January 1861. 1861.
- Cornerstone Speech, March 21, 1861.
- The assertions of a secessionist : from the speech of A.H. Stephens, of Georgia, November 14, 1860. New York: Loyal Publication Society. 1864.
- Carpenter's picture, Lincoln and emancipation : speech of the Hon. Alexander H. Stephens, of Georgia, in the House of Representatives, 12th of February, 1878. Washington, D.C.: Darby & Duvall. 1878.

=== Books ===
- A Constitutional View of the Late War Between the States; Its Causes, Character, Conduct and Results, presented as a series of Colloquies at Liberty Hall. Vol. 1. Philadelphia: National Publishing Company. 1868. OCLC 428852.
- A Constitutional View of the Late War Between the States; Its Causes, Character, Conduct and Results, presented as a series of Colloquies at Liberty Hall. Vol. 2. Philadelphia: National Publishing Company. 1870.
- The reviewers reviewed; a supplement to the "War between the states," etc., with an appendix in review of "Reconstruction," so called. New York: D. Appleton and Co. 1872. OCLC 1469442.
- Pictorial History Of The United States - A Comprehensive and Popular History of the United States Embracing A Full Account of Each of the Colonies Their Union as States; The French and Indian Wars; the War of the Revolution; the Mexican War; the Great War between the North and South; and its Results; The Centennial Of Our Independence; The Assassination of President Garfield; And Events Down To The Present Time. By Alexander H. Stephens. Embellished with more than 300 fine Historical Engravings and Portraits. Pub. by The National Publishing Co., Philadelphia, Pa... 1882
- A compendium of the history of the United States from the earliest settlements to 1872 : designed to answer the purpose of a text book in schools, colleges as well as to meet the wants of general readers. Columbia, S.C.: W. J. Duffie. 1883. "1875"
- A compendium of the history of the United States from the earliest settlements to 1883. Designed to answer the purpose of a text-book in schools and colleges as well as to meet the wants of general readers. New York: E.J. Hale & Son. 1887. "1875"

== Legacy ==
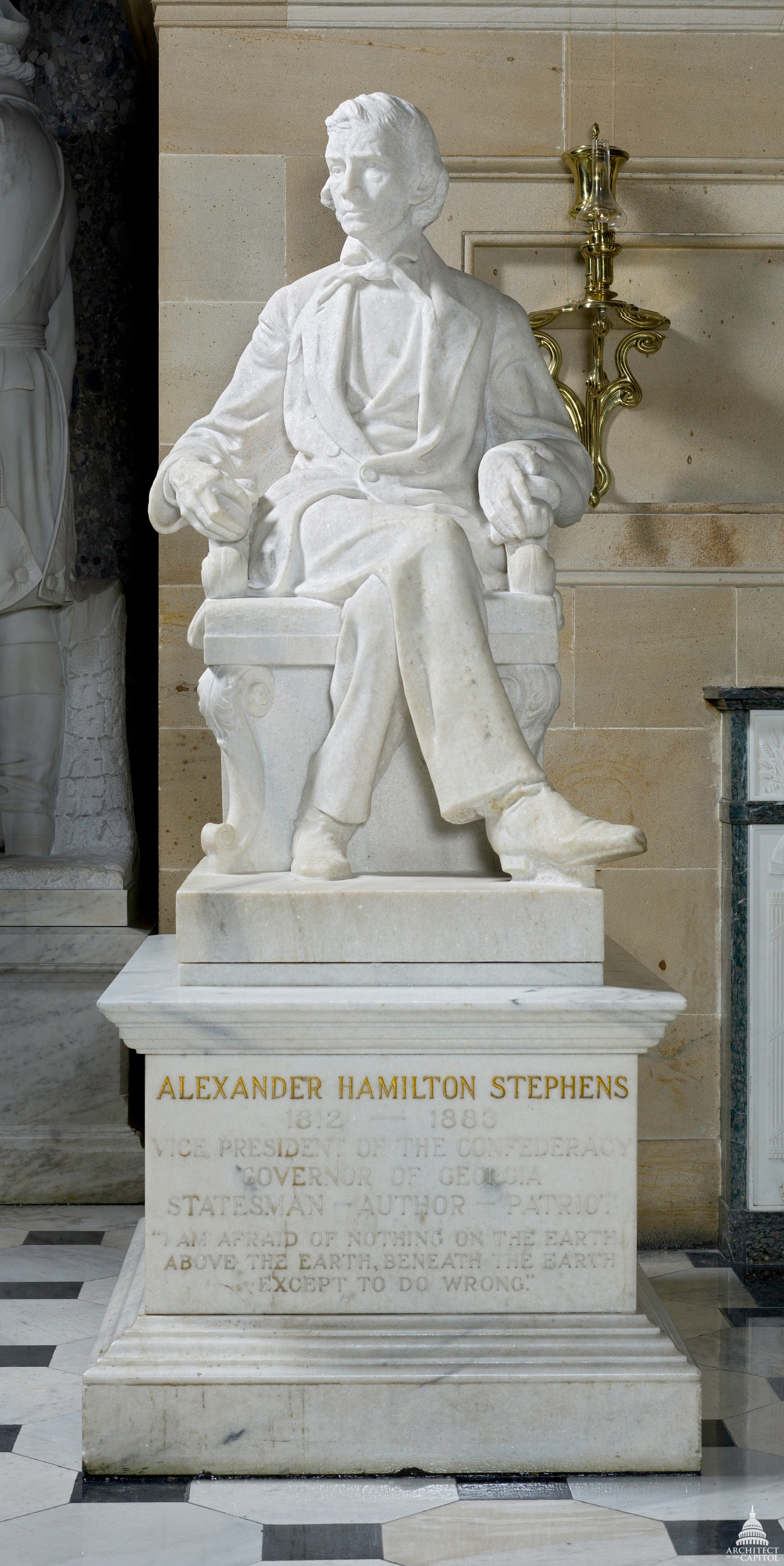
Statue of Stephens sculpted in Georgia marble by Gutzon Borglum, given in 1927 to the National Statuary Hall, U.S. Capitol

- Stephens is pictured on the Confederate States $20.00 banknote (3rd, 5th, 6th, and 7th issues).
- Stephens County, Georgia, and Stephens County, Texas, bear his name, as does A.H. Stephens State Park, near Crawfordville, containing his home Liberty Hall.
- A collection of Stephens's personal papers has been digitized and is available at the Rubenstein Library, Duke University.
- A sculpture of Stephens appears in the National Statuary Hall Collection, representing one of two figures from Georgia history, the other being Crawford W. Long. There have been calls to replace Stephens's sculpture in the collection with that of some other Georgian, such as Martin Luther King Jr.
- According to Bruce Catton, Stephens was "given one of the most haunting nicknames ever worn by an American politician: 'The Little Pale Star from Georgia.'"

== See also ==
- List of signers of the Georgia Ordinance of Secession

== Works cited ==
- Schott, Thomas Edwin (1988). Alexander H. Stephens of Georgia: a biography. Southern biography series. Baton Rouge: Louisiana State University Press. ISBN 978-0-8071-1373-8.

U.S. House of Representatives
Preceded by Mark Cooper	Member of the U.S. House of Representatives from Georgia's at-large congressional district (Seat 1); 1843–1845	Constituency abolished
New constituency	Member of the U.S. House of Representatives from Georgia's 7th congressional district 1845–1853	Succeeded by David Reese
Preceded by Robert Toombs	Member of the U.S. House of Representatives from Georgia's 8th congressional district 1853–1859	Succeeded by John Jones
Preceded by John Jones	Member of the U.S. House of Representatives from Georgia's 8th congressional district 1873–1882	Succeeded by Seaborn Reese
Preceded by Sherman Otis Houghton	Chair of the House Coinage Committee; 1875–1881	Succeeded by Horatio Gates Fisher
Confederate States House of Representatives
New constituency	Member of the Confederate States Provisional Congress from Georgia; 1861–1862	Constituency abolished
Political offices
New office	Vice President of the Confederate States; Provisional: 1861–1862; 1861–1865	Position abolished
Preceded by Alfred Colquitt	governor of Georgia; 1882–1883	Succeeded by James Boynton
Party political offices
Preceded by Alfred H. Colquitt	Democratic nominee for governor of Georgia; 1882	Succeeded by Henry Dickerson McDaniel
