= Colonsay Plantation =

Historic house in Georgia, United States

- U.S. National Register of Historic Places
- Location within Georgia Location within the United States
- Nearest city: Crawfordville, Georgia
- Coordinates: 33°35′57″N 82°41′51″W
- Area: 540 acres (220 ha)
- Built: 1789
- Architect: Mendenhall, Marmaduke
- NRHP reference No.: 74000703
- Added to NRHP: November 21, 1974

The Colonsay Plantation (originally the Old Hamilton Place) was one of the very earliest tracts of land to be granted in the Ceded Lands, while the Province of Georgia still belonged to the British Crown. It was named after the Scottish island Colonsay.

James Mendenhall, born November 26, 1718, in East Caln, Chester County, Pennsylvania, settled near what is now Jamestown, North Carolina, in 1762 and built a mill on the Deep River at a location that is now within City Lake Park. His original land is now under the water of High Point Lake in Guilford County. His mill was just 8 miles (13 km) from the site of the Battle of Guilford Court House. British troops camped at his mill on March 14, 1781, the day before battle.

Due to the persecutions of Governor Tyrone, Mendenhall and his family were forced to move again. He bought 600 acres (2.4 km^{2}) near Wrightsboro, Georgia on December 7, 1773, when a warrant of survey was granted to him by Governor James Wright. The land was located in the fork of Williams Creek and the Little River, in the extreme northeast corner of what was then Wilkes County. Mendenhall went to Wrightsboro with two of his sons, Phineas and Marmaduke.

He was unable to take possession of his grant on Williams Creek because he died shortly after his arrival. He died in the cabin 1782 in Wrightsboro that he had built there and was buried on his land. This land is now in Taliaferro County.

On July 27, 1784, Marmaduke inherited a tract of 600 acres (2.4 km^{2}) from his father. It was almost square. Starting with the junction of Williams Creek with the Little River, the line followed the river northwardly for about a mile. Turning, it ran a mile straight westward, then a mile, with only a slight dog-leg, southward to join Williams Creek, whose course it followed for another mile until it reached its starting point at the fork of the two streams.

In 1789–1790, Marmaduke built a substantial house which apparently was designed as an inn, trading post and stage coach stop on the road from Washington to Wrightsboro. It had two stories and consisted of two large rooms 20 × 20 feet, one over the other. The inside chimney was flanked on one side by a cupboard and on the other by a narrow winding staircase. This staircase was peculiar in that at a height of eight feet it made a complete semicircle. Another circular staircase directly above this led into the loft. The roof sloped down directly over the staircase so that one had to crawl in order to enter the loft. The open beams were all hand-hewn, and all joints were mortised and tenoned and secured with wooden pegs. Both rooms were paneled with wide boards of virgin pine, dark brown and mellowed with the passing years. The house is still standing and occupied. It is owned by Ian Mcfie. Before Ian McFie, the home and 540 of the original 600 acres (2.4 km^{2}) were owned by his father Girdwood Mcfie. Girdwood maintained the farm animals in exactly the same numbers as listed in the inventory of Marmaduke's estate in 1797.
