= Taliaferro County Courthouse =

- U.S. National Register of Historic Places
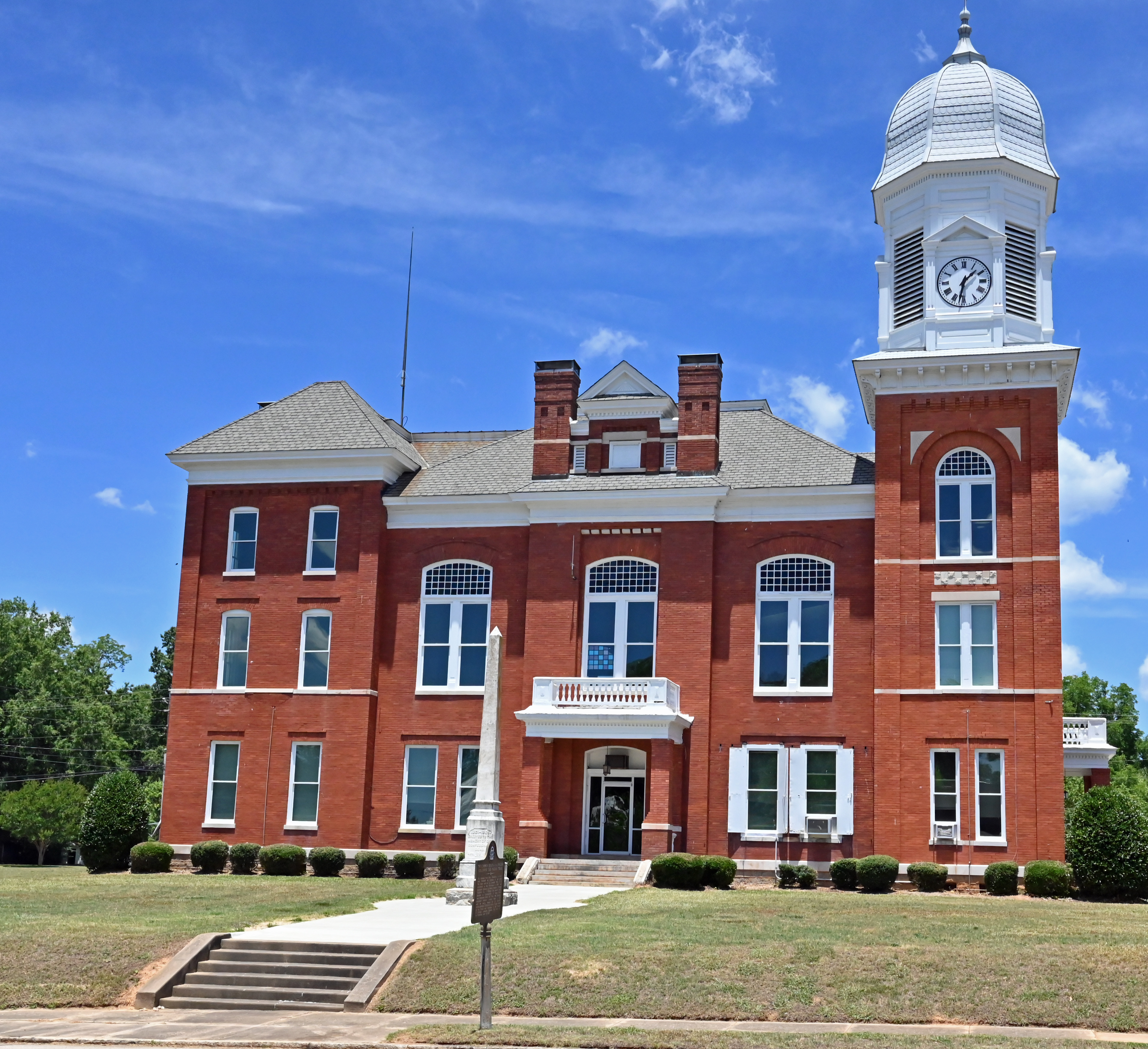

- Location within Georgia Location within the United States
- Interactive map showing the location of Taliaferro County Courthouse
- Location: GA 12, Crawfordville, Georgia
- Coordinates: 33°33′16″N 82°53′48″W
- Area: 1.1 acres (0.45 ha)
- Built: 1901–1902
- Architect: Lewis F. Goodrich, J.H. McKenzie & Son
- Architectural style: High Victorian
- MPS: Georgia County Courthouses TR
- NRHP reference No.: 80001242
- Added to NRHP: September 18, 1980

Taliaferro County Courthouse is a historical government facility and clock tower located in downtown Crawfordville, Georgia, ninety miles (140 km) east of Atlanta and around fifty miles west of Augusta. The surrounding buildings are the Health Department, Senior Citizens building, Family Connection Center, and the Georgia Farm Bureau. It has been the official home of Taliaferro's Superior Court, and the base of the county's government, as well as other numerous administrative offices.

== History ==
The Courthouse, town plan, which was drawn by James Carlton in 1828 is the first courthouse in Taliaferro County. James also built many early buildings in Athens, Georgia including the 1855 Georgia Railroad Depot designed and constructed with bricks that he made himself. According to the Crawfordville Advocate Democrat, supporters of the new courthouse had to demolish the old courthouse in the middle of the night in order to confirm the county's need for a new structure.

The Taliaferro County Courthouse was a similar design of the courthouse he constructed located in Screven County. Lewis F. Goodrich's design influenced Alexander Bruce and his courthouse designs located in Sparta, Gainesville, and Monroe.

On September 18, 1980, it was added to the National Register of Historic Places.

== Architecture ==
=== James Carlton ===
The streets along each side of the courthouse intersect at the corners of the square. The facility is a similar pattern: a rectangular or square floor plan, with four entrances on the ground floor each flanked symmetrically by windows. Carlton's floor plan places the courtroom on the second floor of the courthouse.

=== Lewis F. Goodrich, J H Mckenzie & Son ===
The updated Taliaferro County, Georgia Courthouse and Clock tower was designed on December 24, 1825, by architect Lewis F Goodrich of Augusta, Georgia and contractor J H Mckenzie & Son, it was built from 1901 to 1902 on the site of the first Taliaferro County Courthouse (1828) which had been demolished to make way for this new one. The building is the style of High Victorian Gothic, facing east with three story, bright red bricks.

The three-story red brick facility features corner towers with pyramidal and white ogee-shaped roofs. One of the towers is a four-story clock tower with an octagonally shaped domed cupola. Elements of the building include a variety of window shapes and sizes, round, segmental and flat arches, and a granite white trim. Each of the four sides of the building features a central one-story entry porch. Each porch has six steps leading to the entrance. A small guardhouse is located on the southeast corner of the square. A confederate monument is located on the south lawn of the courthouse. The monument was placed on April 26, 1898.

== Annex ==
In January 2011, The Taliaferro County Board of Commissioners opened the new Courthouse annex. The Courthouse Annex replaces the current courtroom in the courthouse which spreads over the second floor. The courts were located in the Courthouse for a long time, but were no longer adequate and did not meet current standards and codes required. The new facility is approximately 3200 square feet and it has a courtroom, jury room, two council rooms, judge chambers, four restrooms and a holding cell with secured doors and hallways.

== Clock tower ==
The clock would ring every hour on the hour for many years until it stopped working. In 2009, local Historical Society across from the post office, began raising funds to repair the Courthouse clock. The organization raised enough funds and the clock was repaired in 2011. It can be heard ringing every hour once again.
