= 1882 Georgia gubernatorial election =

- October 4, 1882
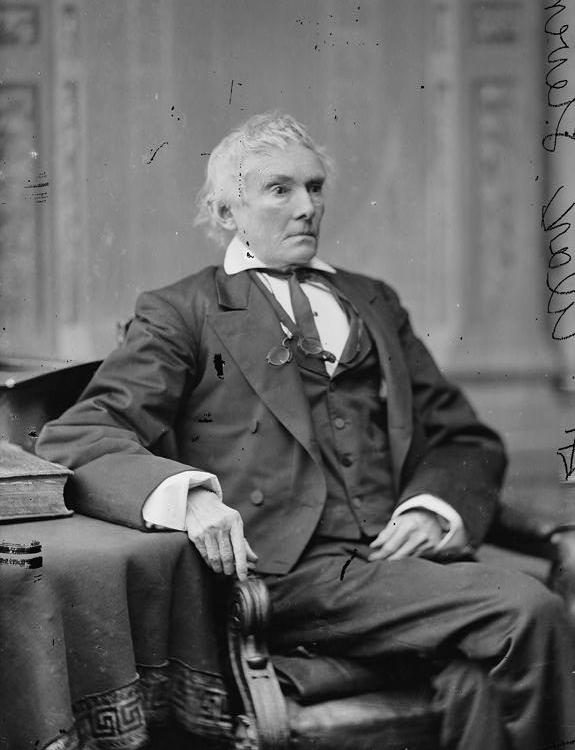

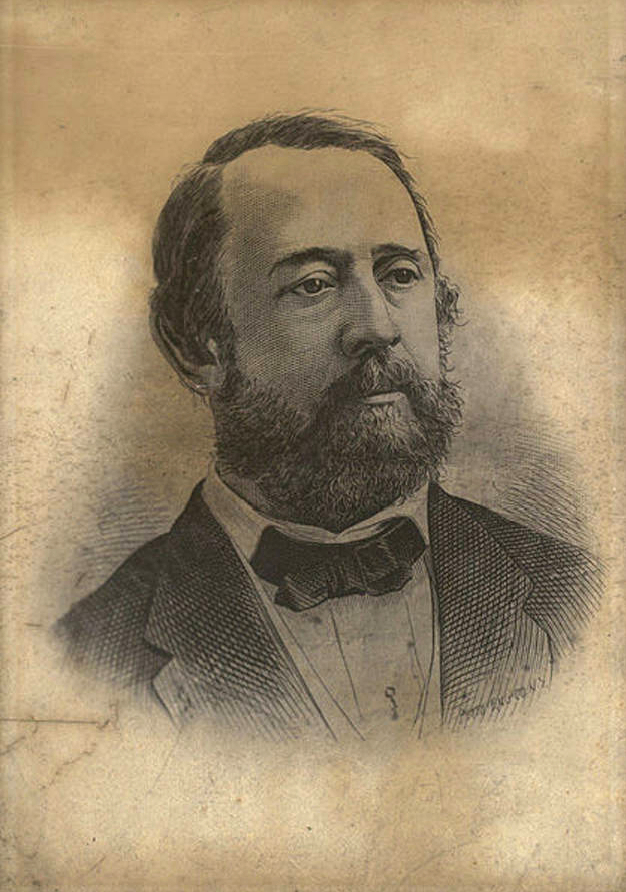
Nominee	Alexander H. Stephens	Lucius J. Gartrell
Party	Democratic	Independent Democrat
Popular vote	107,649	44,893
Percentage	70.57%	29.43%
- County results Stephens: 50–60% 60–70% 70–80% 80–90% >90% Gartrell: 50–60% 60–70%
Governor before election
Alfred H. Colquitt
Democratic
Elected Governor
Alexander H. Stephens
Democratic

The 1882 Georgia gubernatorial election was held on October 4, 1882, in order to elect the governor of Georgia. Democratic nominee and former Vice President of the Confederate States of America Alexander H. Stephens defeated Independent Democratic nominee and former member of the Confederate House of Representatives from Georgia's 8th District Lucius J. Gartrell.

== General election ==
On election day, October 4, 1882, Democratic nominee Alexander H. Stephens won the election by a margin of 62,756 votes against his opponent, Independent Democratic nominee Lucius J. Gartrell, thereby holding Democratic control over the office of governor. Stephens was sworn in as the 50th governor of Georgia on November 4, 1882.

=== Results ===
Georgia gubernatorial election, 1882
Party	Candidate	Votes	%
Democratic	Alexander H. Stephens	107,649	70.57
Independent Democrat	Lucius J. Gartrell	44,893	29.43
Total votes		152,542	100.00
Democratic hold			
