= Francis H. Cone =

American judge

Francis Hiram Cone (September 5, 1797 – May 18, 1859) was a judge of the Georgia Superior Courts and a Georgia State Senator, who is primarily remembered for fighting and severely wounding U.S. Representative and future Confederate Vice President Alexander Stephens at the Atlanta Hotel in 1848.

== Early life and career ==
Francis H. Cone was born on September 5, 1797, to Joshua Cone and Chloe Chapman in East Haddam, Connecticut. He graduated from Yale University in 1818, and subsequently moved to Greene County, Georgia to practice law. During this time, Cone came to know Alexander Stephens, who practiced law in nearby Taliaferro County. On January 8, 1829, Cone married Jane Williams Cook, a ward of US Senator William Crosby Dawson.

In 1841, Cone was elected judge of the superior court of the Ocmulgee district. Four years later, he was elected to the position once again. This was the highest court in Georgia until 1845, when its supreme court was established.

=== Stephens assault ===
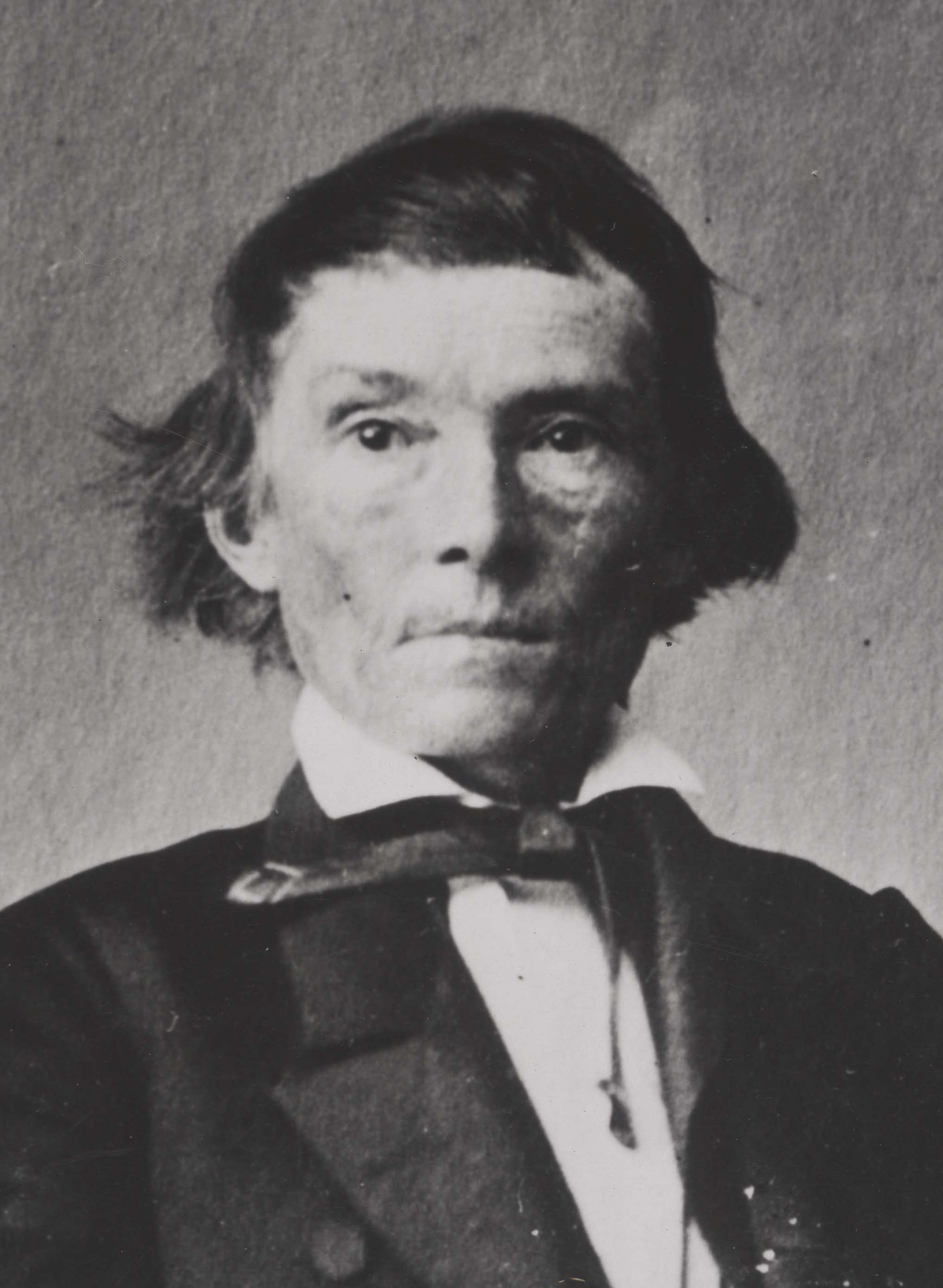
Alexander Stephens

Like many other Democrats, in 1848, Cone became furious at the Whig politician Alexander Stephens for tabling the Clayton Compromise, and publicly denounced Stephens as a traitor to the South. When Stephens confronted Cone over this charge in August 1848, Cone discounted the rumors. However, Cone immediately regretted retracting his statements about Stephens. On August 26, Cone wrote a letter to Stephens demanding that Stephens apologize for the confrontation.

In September, Cone encountered Stephens on the piazza of the Thompson's Hotel in Atlanta. Cone approached Stephens and again demanded that he apologize, to which Stephens responded coldly. Cone proceeded to verbally insult Stephens, and in response, Stephens struck Cone in the face with his walking cane. The enraged Cone drew a knife and started slashing at Stephens. As Stephens was extremely small in stature, Cone immediately gained the advantage in the fight. Cone was eventually pulled away from Stephens' body by a crowd of bystanders, but not before he had stabbed Stephens six times.

Stephens was seriously wounded in the fight, and had to be immediately treated in the hotel. He was forced to stay in bed for several weeks, and never regained full use of his right hand. Despite these injuries, however, Stephens opted not to press charges against Cone, who later pleaded guilty to the lesser charge of stabbing and was fined eight hundred dollars.

== Later life ==
In 1856, Cone was elected State Senator of Georgia. He served three years before his death on May 18, 1859. In the years prior to his death, Cone managed to reconcile with Stephens, and the two resumed their cordial relationship of earlier years.

== See also ==
- Alexander Stephens
