= English Bill (1858) =

Proposed American land deal

The English Bill was drafted on April 23, 1858, it was an offer made by the United States Congress to Kansas Territory. Kansas was offered some millions of acres of public lands in exchange for accepting the Lecompton Constitution.

The English Bill was introduced by William Hayden English (1822–1896), a Democratic representative in Congress from 1853 to 1861. The bill itself was not a bribe to the degree that it is usually considered to be, as it reduced the grant of land demanded by the Lecompton Ordinance from 23,500,000 to 3,500,000 acres (95,000 to 14,000 km^{2}), and offered only the normal cession to new states. This grant, however, was conditioned on the acceptance of the Lecompton Constitution, and Congress made no promise of any grant if that Constitution were not adopted.

On August 21, 1858, by a vote of 11,812 to 1,926, Kansans rejected the offer.
