= Sharon, Georgia =

- City
- Location in Taliaferro County and the state of Georgia
- Coordinates: 33°33′31″N 82°47′38″W
- Country: United States
- State: Georgia
- County: Taliaferro
- Incorporated (city): 1884

Government
  - Type: Mayor-council government
  - Mayor: Renée Brown
  - Sharon City Council: Members: Tommy Fanning; Jerry Harris; Augustus Mayo; Richard Wynn
  - City Clerk: Jane Kuehn

Area
  - Total: 0.78 sq mi (2.03 km^{2})
  - Land: 0.78 sq mi (2.02 km^{2})
  - Water: 0.0039 sq mi (0.01 km^{2})
- Elevation: 600 ft (183 m)

Population (2020)
  - Total: 104
  - Density: 133.3/sq mi (51.46/km^{2})
- Time zone: UTC-5 (Eastern (EST))
  - Summer (DST): UTC-4 (EDT)
- ZIP code: 30664
- Area code: 706
- FIPS code: 13-69896
- GNIS feature ID: 0322779

Sharon is a city in Taliaferro County, Georgia, United States. The population was 104 in 2020.

== History ==
The community of Sharon is visible on maps as early as 1865. The Georgia General Assembly incorporated Sharon as a town in 1884. The community is named after the Plain of Sharon, a place mentioned in the Hebrew Bible.

Into the 1890s, Sharon was bustling with thousands of travelers who came there for the reputed healing powers of the nearby Electric Health Resort, where it was said that exposure to bedrock in a subterranean chamber provided electrical healing powers. The resort, which included a hotel, lake, and post office, eventually burned down.

== Geography ==
Sharon is located at 33°33′31″N 82°47′38″W (33.558724, -82.793784). According to the United States Census Bureau, the city has a total area of 0.8 square miles (2.1 km^{2}), all land.

== Demographics ==
Historical population
| Census | Pop. | Note | %± |
|---|---|---|---|
| 1890 | 172 | | — |
| 1900 | 319 | | 85.5% |
| 1910 | 293 | | −8.2% |
| 1920 | 282 | | −3.8% |
| 1930 | 253 | | −10.3% |
| 1940 | 282 | | 11.5% |
| 1950 | 224 | | −20.6% |
| 1960 | 264 | | 17.9% |
| 1970 | 160 | | −39.4% |
| 1980 | 140 | | −12.5% |
| 1990 | 94 | | −32.9% |
| 2000 | 105 | | 11.7% |
| 2010 | 140 | | 33.3% |
| 2020 | 104 | | −25.7% |
U.S. Decennial Census; 1850-1870 1870-1880; 1890-1910 1920-1930; 1940 1950 1960; 1970 1980 1990; 2000 2010 2020

=== Racial and ethnic composition ===
Sharon city, Georgia – Racial and ethnic composition Note: the US Census treats Hispanic/Latino as an ethnic category. This table excludes Latinos from the racial categories and assigns them to a separate category. Hispanics/Latinos may be of any race.
| Race / Ethnicity (NH = Non-Hispanic) | Pop 2000 | Pop 2010 | Pop 2020 | % 2000 | % 2010 | % 2020 |
|---|---|---|---|---|---|---|
| White alone (NH) | 29 | 54 | 47 | 27.62% | 38.57% | 45.19% |
| Black or African American alone (NH) | 75 | 75 | 52 | 71.43% | 53.57% | 50.00% |
| Native American or Alaska Native alone (NH) | 0 | 0 | 2 | 0.00% | 0.00% | 1.92% |
| Asian alone (NH) | 1 | 0 | 0 | 0.95% | 0.00% | 0.00% |
| Native Hawaiian or Pacific Islander alone (NH) | 0 | 0 | 0 | 0.00% | 0.00% | 0.00% |
| Other race alone (NH) | 0 | 0 | 0 | 0.00% | 0.00% | 0.00% |
| Mixed race or Multiracial (NH) | 0 | 5 | 2 | 0.00% | 3.57% | 1.92% |
| Hispanic or Latino (any race) | 0 | 6 | 1 | 0.00% | 4.29% | 0.96% |
| Total | 105 | 140 | 104 | 100.00% | 100.00% | 100.00% |

=== 2000 census ===
As of the census of 2000, there were 105 people, 46 households, and 28 families residing in the city. By 2020, its population was 104.

== Notable person ==
Lloyd D. Brown, United States Army Major General who commanded 28th Infantry Division in World War II

== See also ==
- Central Savannah River Area
