= A. H. Stephens State Park =

State park in Crawfordville, Georgia, US

- U.S. National Register of Historic Places
- U.S. Historic district
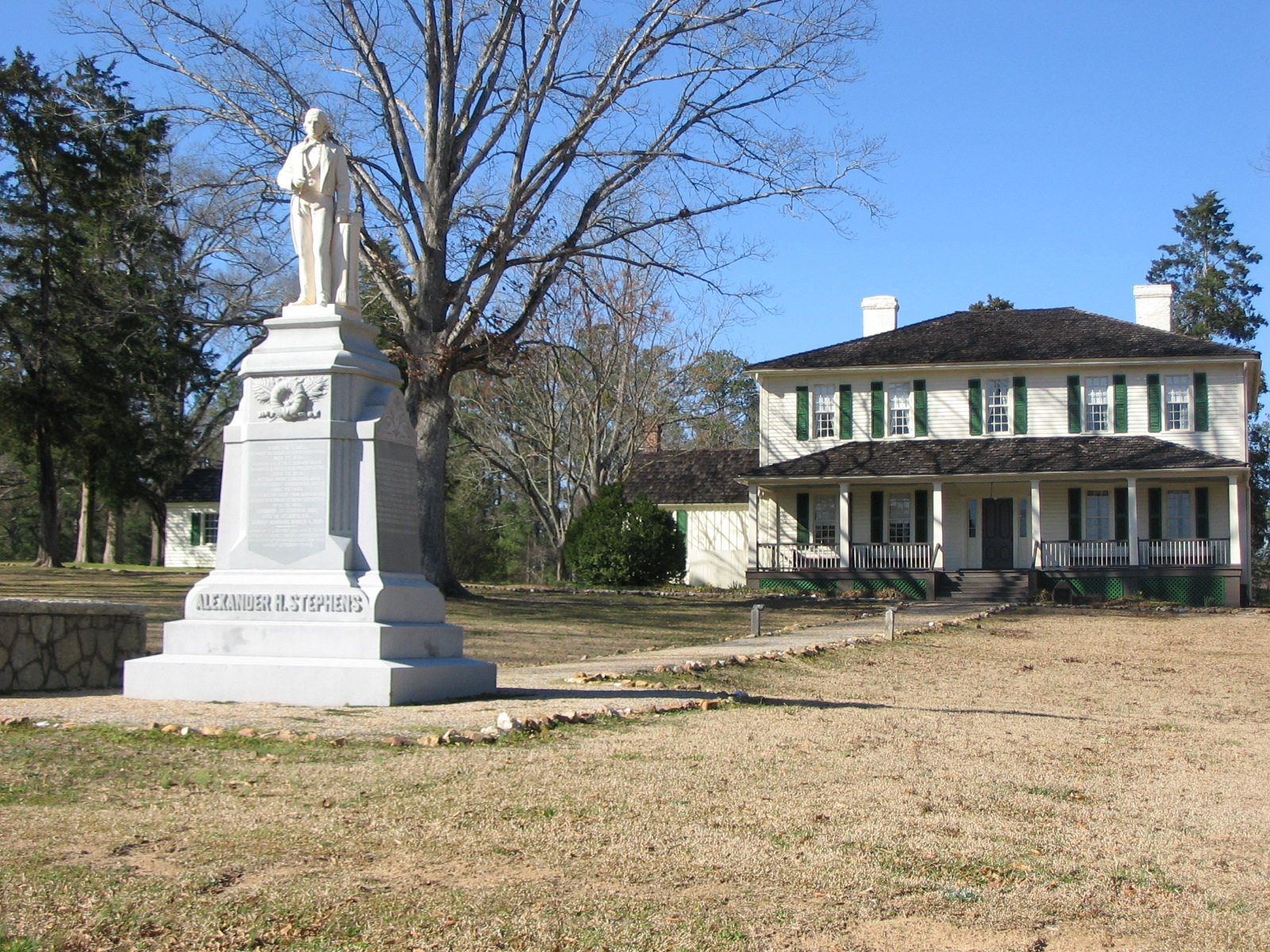
- Alexander Stephens Memorial

- Location within Georgia Location within the United States
- Nearest city: Crawfordville, Georgia
- Coordinates: 33°34′13″N 82°53′39″W
- Area: 1,200 acres (490 ha)
- Built: 1875
- Architectural style: Colonial Revival, Rustic Style
- Website: Official website
- NRHP reference No.: 95000764
- Added to NRHP: June 22, 1995

A. H. Stephens State Park is a 1,177 acres (476 ha) Georgia state park located in Crawfordville. The park is named for Alexander H. Stephens, the Vice President of the Confederate States of America, and a former Georgia governor. The park contains Stephens' home, Liberty Hall, which has been fully restored to its original 1875 style. The park's museum houses one of Georgia's largest collections of American Civil War artifacts. The park also offers several mill ponds for fishing and nature trails.

The park is listed on the National Register of Historic Places as A. H. Stephens State Park. It includes four contributing sites, twelve contributing structures, and one other contributing object. It includes Colonial Revival and Rustic Style architecture.

== History ==
Alexander Hamilton Stephens once owned the land of A. H. Stephens State Park. After he died, the property came under the control of the Stephens Monument Commission, a group chartered to protect Liberty Hall and its surroundings. The state received the land in 1933 to establish Georgia's third-oldest state park. The U.S. Government later acquired several hundred acres of land adjacent to the property. The current boundary of the park was completed by transferring ownership of this area to the state.

The museum was established in the 1950s after work by Horace Holden, Stephens' niece and a United Daughters of the Confederacy member, who assisted in creating it.

The park's civil engineering was built during the 1930s by the Civilian Conservation Corps and Works Progress Administration. The state acquired 15 acres of Taliaferro County Board of Education-owned property in 2001, which increased the park's current acreage.

== Liberty Hall ==
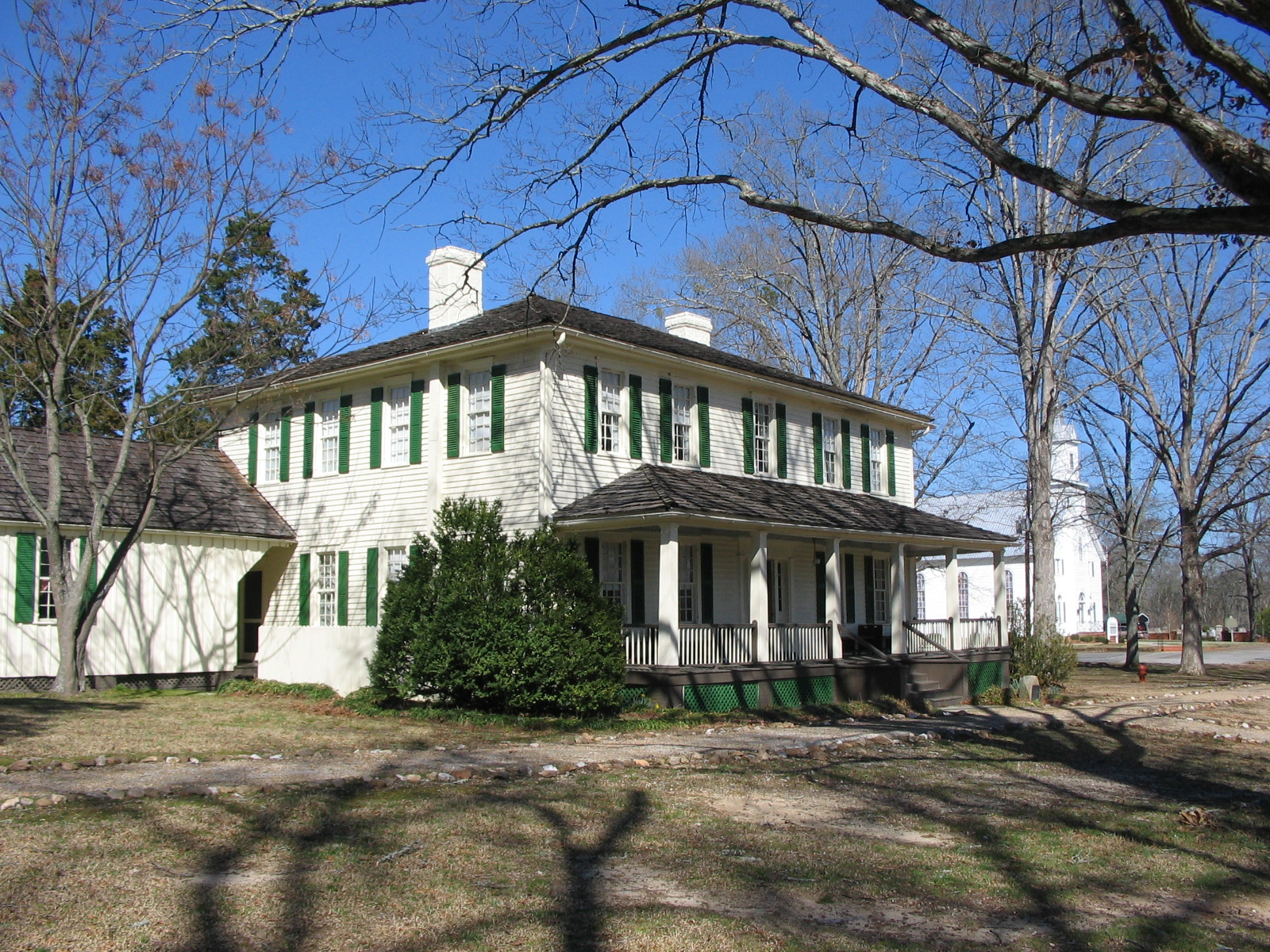
Liberty Hall in Crawfordville, Georgia

The Liberty Hall, also known as Bachelor's Hall, built in 1834, is one of the structures on the site and is separately listed on the NRHP. It is a National Historic Landmark maintained by the Georgia Department of Natural Resources. A. H. Stephens bought the estate in 1845 and lived in this house until 1875 when he tore down the main structure to construct Liberty Hall. The two-story "big house" is a traditional 4 × 4 with four rooms on each level.

Many of Stephens' books are housed in a smaller structure behind the facility, where he spent much of his time after the war. After Stephens died in 1883, Liberty Hall, owned by his surviving relatives, served as a boardinghouse until 1932, when it was donated to Georgia. Stephens' grave is on the front lawn, beneath a marble statue.

== Facilities ==
- 21 Tent/trailer/RV campsites
- 4 Cottages
- 30 Horse stables
- 18 Horse campsites
- 1 Group camp
- 1 Pioneer campground
- 2 Picnic shelters
- 1 Group shelter

== Annual events ==
- Junior/Senior Fishing Rodeos (June)
- Christmas on Lake Liberty (December)
- Victorian Christmas Program (December)
