= Taliaferro County, Georgia =

County in Georgia, United States

- County
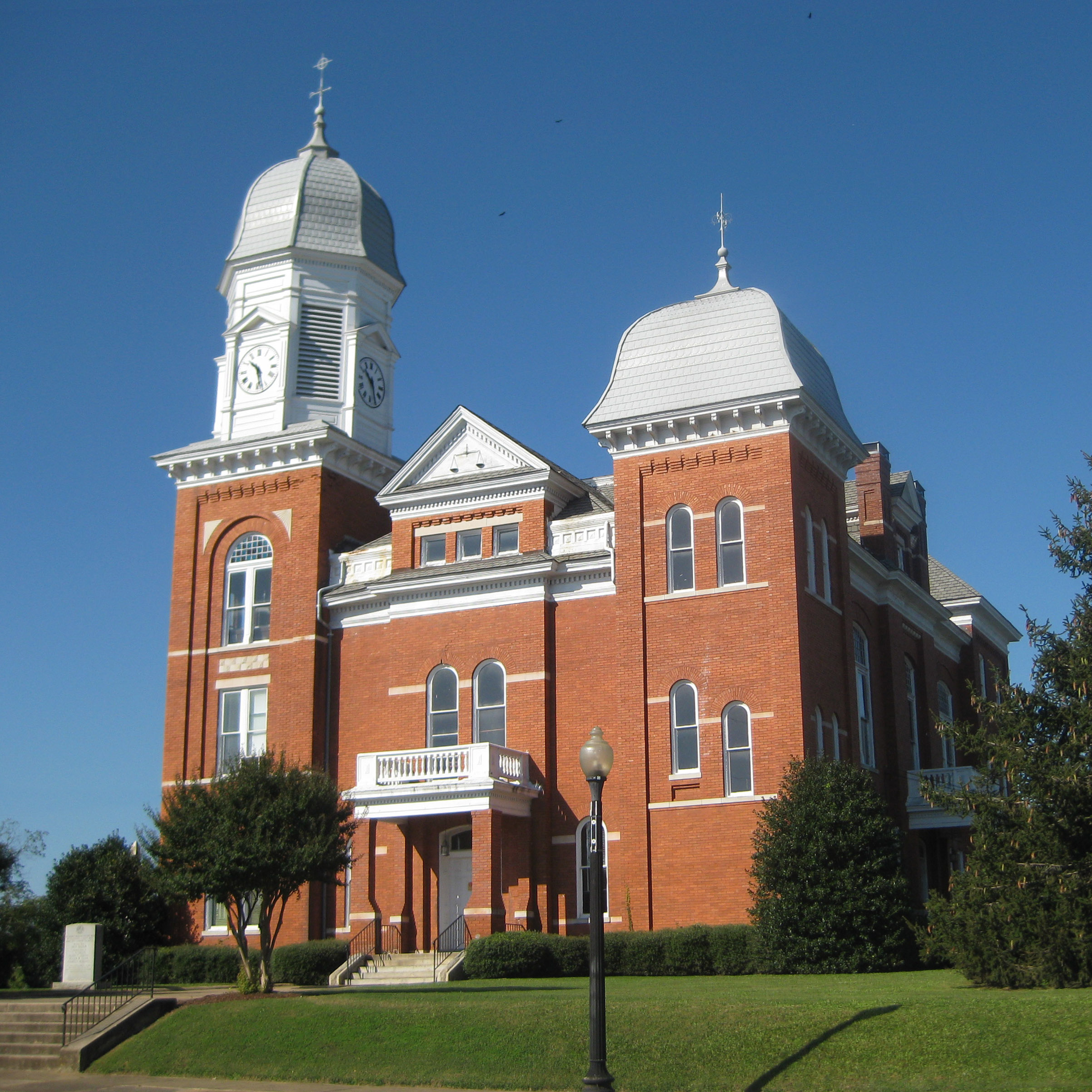
- Taliaferro County Courthouse (built 1902), Crawfordville

- Location within the U.S. state of Georgia
- Coordinates: 33°34′N 82°53′W
- Country: United States
- State: Georgia
- Founded: December 24, 1825; 200 years ago
- Named for: Benjamin Taliaferro
- Seat: Crawfordville
- Largest city: Crawfordville

Area
  - Total: 195 sq mi (510 km^{2})
  - Land: 195 sq mi (510 km^{2})
  - Water: 0.7 sq mi (1.8 km^{2}) 0.4%

Population (2020)
  - Total: 1,559
  - Estimate (2025): 1,662 ▲
  - Density: 8/sq mi (3.1/km^{2})
- Time zone: UTC−5 (Eastern)
  - Summer (DST): UTC−4 (EDT)
- Congressional district: 10th
- Website: taliaferrocountyga.org

Taliaferro County (/ˈtɒlɪvər/ TOL-iv-ər) is a county located in East central Piedmont region of the U.S. state of Georgia. As of the 2020 census, the population was 1,559, down from the 2010 census when the population was 1,717, making it the least populous county in Georgia and the second least populous county east of the Mississippi River (after Issaquena County, Mississippi). The county seat is Crawfordville.

== History ==
Taliaferro County was formed by an act of the Georgia Legislature meeting in Milledgeville on December 24, 1825. It was formed by taking portions of five other counties: Wilkes, Greene, Hancock, Oglethorpe, and Warren Counties.

The county was named for Colonel Benjamin Taliaferro of Virginia, who was an officer in the American Revolution.

The county is most famous for containing the birthplace and home of Alexander H. Stephens, who served as a U.S. congressman from Georgia in the antebellum South, as vice president of the Confederate States of America during the Civil War, and as governor of Georgia after the war (dying in office). A. H. Stephens State Park in Crawfordville is named after him.

During the segregation era, due to judge-ordered desegregation of public schools, all white children moved to white-only private schools, leading to the county being segregated up until 1976.

== Geography ==
According to the U.S. Census Bureau, the county has a total area of 195 square miles (510 km^{2}), of which 195 square miles (510 km^{2}) is land and 0.7 square miles (1.8 km^{2}) (0.4%) is water. It is drained by tributaries of the Ogeechee and Little rivers.

The northern half of Taliaferro County, north of Crawfordville, is located in the Little River sub-basin of the Savannah River basin. The southern half of the county is located in the Upper Ogeechee River sub-basin of the Ogeechee River basin.

=== Major highways ===
- I-20 / SR 402 – SR 402 is the unsigned designation for I-20
- US 278 / SR 12
- SR 22
- SR 44
- SR 47

=== Adjacent counties ===
- Wilkes County - Northeast
- Oglethorpe County - northwest
- Warren County - southeast
- Hancock County - south
- Greene County - west

== Communities ==
=== Cities ===
- Crawfordville (county seat)
- Sharon

== Demographics ==
Historical population
| Census | Pop. | Note | %± |
|---|---|---|---|
| 1830 | 4,934 | | — |
| 1840 | 5,190 | | 5.2% |
| 1850 | 5,146 | | −0.8% |
| 1860 | 4,583 | | −10.9% |
| 1870 | 4,796 | | 4.6% |
| 1880 | 7,034 | | 46.7% |
| 1890 | 7,291 | | 3.7% |
| 1900 | 7,912 | | 8.5% |
| 1910 | 8,766 | | 10.8% |
| 1920 | 8,841 | | 0.9% |
| 1930 | 6,172 | | −30.2% |
| 1940 | 6,278 | | 1.7% |
| 1950 | 4,515 | | −28.1% |
| 1960 | 3,370 | | −25.4% |
| 1970 | 2,423 | | −28.1% |
| 1980 | 2,032 | | −16.1% |
| 1990 | 1,915 | | −5.8% |
| 2000 | 2,077 | | 8.5% |
| 2010 | 1,717 | | −17.3% |
| 2020 | 1,559 | | −9.2% |
| 2025 (est.) | 1,662 | ▲ | 6.6% |
U.S. Decennial Census; 1790-1880 1890-1910; 1920-1930 1930-1940; 1940-1950 1960-1980; 1980-2000 2010 2020

=== Racial and ethnic composition ===
Taliaferro County, Georgia – Racial and ethnic composition Note: the US Census treats Hispanic/Latino as an ethnic category. This table excludes Latinos from the racial categories and assigns them to a separate category. Hispanics/Latinos may be of any race.
| Race / Ethnicity (NH = Non-Hispanic) | Pop 1980 | Pop 1990 | Pop 2000 | Pop 2010 | Pop 2020 | % 1980 | % 1990 | % 2000 | % 2010 | % 2020 |
|---|---|---|---|---|---|---|---|---|---|---|
| White alone (NH) | 709 | 736 | 787 | 625 | 591 | 34.89% | 38.43% | 37.89% | 36.40% | 37.91% |
| Black or African American alone (NH) | 1,299 | 1,152 | 1,251 | 1,024 | 833 | 63.93% | 60.16% | 60.23% | 59.64% | 53.43% |
| Native American or Alaska Native alone (NH) | 1 | 1 | 1 | 2 | 4 | 0.05% | 0.05% | 0.05% | 0.12% | 0.26% |
| Asian alone (NH) | 2 | 4 | 1 | 8 | 6 | 0.10% | 0.21% | 0.05% | 0.47% | 0.38% |
| Native Hawaiian or Pacific Islander alone (NH) | x | x | 0 | 0 | 0 | x | x | 0.00% | 0.00% | 0.00% |
| Other race alone (NH) | 0 | 1 | 6 | 0 | 2 | 0.00% | 0.05% | 0.29% | 0.00% | 0.13% |
| Mixed race or Multiracial (NH) | x | x | 12 | 23 | 54 | x | x | 0.58% | 1.34% | 3.46% |
| Hispanic or Latino (any race) | 21 | 21 | 19 | 35 | 69 | 1.03% | 1.10% | 0.91% | 2.04% | 4.43% |
| Total | 2,032 | 1,915 | 2,077 | 1,717 | 1,559 | 100.00% | 100.00% | 100.00% | 100.00% | 100.00% |

=== 2020 census ===
As of the 2020 census, the county had a population of 1,559. The median age was 51.0 years. 17.3% of residents were under the age of 18 and 28.5% of residents were 65 years of age or older. For every 100 females there were 100.4 males, and for every 100 females age 18 and over there were 100.2 males age 18 and over. 0.0% of residents lived in urban areas, while 100.0% lived in rural areas.

The racial makeup of the county was 38.9% White, 53.4% Black or African American, 0.3% American Indian and Alaska Native, 0.4% Asian, 0.0% Native Hawaiian and Pacific Islander, 1.8% from some other race, and 5.3% from two or more races. Hispanic or Latino residents of any race comprised 4.4% of the population.

There were 699 households in the county, of which 27.8% had children under the age of 18 living with them and 34.5% had a female householder with no spouse or partner present. About 36.2% of all households were made up of individuals and 18.1% had someone living alone who was 65 years of age or older.

There were 908 housing units, of which 23.0% were vacant. Among occupied housing units, 72.5% were owner-occupied and 27.5% were renter-occupied. The homeowner vacancy rate was 0.8% and the rental vacancy rate was 5.8%.

== Economy ==
Taliaferro county's main employer is the government, primarily the Taliaferro County Sheriffs Department, which patrols I-20 and issues many traffic tickets per capita compared to other counties in the state. For instance, Fulton County, the largest county by population in Georgia, gains $16.98 per capita in traffic ticket revenue. By comparison, Taliaferro county gains $1,614.33 per capita, which is around a hundred times more.

== In popular culture ==
Several Hollywood films have been shot in Taliaferro County. Paris Trout (1991), starring Dennis Hopper and based on the novel by the same name by Pete Dexter, was primarily filmed in the county. Sweet Home Alabama (2002), starring Reese Witherspoon, was filmed in the county seat of Crawfordville.

== Politics ==
As of the 2020s, Taliaferro County is a strongly Democratic Party voting county, voting 57% for Kamala Harris in 2024. Taliaferro County is one of the most reliably Democratic counties in Georgia, despite being mostly rural in nature, due to being majority African American. It has supported the Democratic candidate in every presidential election by wide margins except in 1972, when Richard Nixon won by a landslide. In 2024, Trump became the first Republican since Nixon to get at least 40% of the vote.

For elections to the United States House of Representatives, Taliaferro County is part of Georgia's 10th congressional district, currently represented by Mike Collins. For elections to the Georgia State Senate, Taliaferro County is part of District 23. For elections to the Georgia House of Representatives, Taliaferro County is part of District 124.

United States presidential election results for Taliaferro County, Georgia
| Year | Republican | | Democratic | | Third party(ies) | |
| Year | No. | % | No. | % | No. | % |
|---|---|---|---|---|---|---|
| 1912 | 35 | 12.50% | 225 | 80.36% | 20 | 7.14% |
| 1916 | 14 | 5.07% | 255 | 92.39% | 7 | 2.54% |
| 1920 | 12 | 3.51% | 330 | 96.49% | 0 | 0.00% |
| 1924 | 4 | 1.37% | 228 | 77.82% | 61 | 20.82% |
| 1928 | 58 | 11.51% | 446 | 88.49% | 0 | 0.00% |
| 1932 | 3 | 0.59% | 503 | 99.41% | 0 | 0.00% |
| 1936 | 14 | 2.44% | 552 | 96.34% | 7 | 1.22% |
| 1940 | 19 | 3.61% | 507 | 96.39% | 0 | 0.00% |
| 1944 | 6 | 1.52% | 389 | 98.48% | 0 | 0.00% |
| 1948 | 21 | 3.51% | 504 | 84.14% | 74 | 12.35% |
| 1952 | 103 | 10.55% | 873 | 89.45% | 0 | 0.00% |
| 1956 | 160 | 21.08% | 599 | 78.92% | 0 | 0.00% |
| 1960 | 148 | 18.43% | 655 | 81.57% | 0 | 0.00% |
| 1964 | 337 | 34.92% | 628 | 65.08% | 0 | 0.00% |
| 1968 | 232 | 16.36% | 678 | 47.81% | 508 | 35.83% |
| 1972 | 585 | 61.13% | 372 | 38.87% | 0 | 0.00% |
| 1976 | 236 | 23.98% | 748 | 76.02% | 0 | 0.00% |
| 1980 | 270 | 28.30% | 670 | 70.23% | 14 | 1.47% |
| 1984 | 318 | 36.64% | 550 | 63.36% | 0 | 0.00% |
| 1988 | 306 | 39.38% | 469 | 60.36% | 2 | 0.26% |
| 1992 | 269 | 24.32% | 755 | 68.26% | 82 | 7.41% |
| 1996 | 235 | 26.52% | 615 | 69.41% | 36 | 4.06% |
| 2000 | 271 | 32.57% | 556 | 66.83% | 5 | 0.60% |
| 2004 | 335 | 35.23% | 612 | 64.35% | 4 | 0.42% |
| 2008 | 339 | 34.24% | 643 | 64.95% | 8 | 0.81% |
| 2012 | 323 | 33.54% | 636 | 66.04% | 4 | 0.42% |
| 2016 | 349 | 38.91% | 545 | 60.76% | 3 | 0.33% |
| 2020 | 360 | 38.79% | 561 | 60.45% | 7 | 0.75% |
| 2024 | 375 | 42.42% | 507 | 57.35% | 2 | 0.23% |

United States Senate election results for Taliaferro County, Georgia2
| Year | Republican | | Democratic | | Third party(ies) | |
| Year | No. | % | No. | % | No. | % |
|---|---|---|---|---|---|---|
| 2020 | 366 | 40.58% | 521 | 57.76% | 15 | 1.66% |
| 2020 | 332 | 39.29% | 513 | 60.71% | 0 | 0.00% |

United States Senate election results for Taliaferro County, Georgia3
| Year | Republican | | Democratic | | Third party(ies) | |
| Year | No. | % | No. | % | No. | % |
|---|---|---|---|---|---|---|
| 2020 | 178 | 20.14% | 343 | 38.80% | 363 | 41.06% |
| 2020 | 360 | 39.09% | 561 | 60.91% | 0 | 0.00% |
| 2022 | 310 | 38.90% | 483 | 60.60% | 4 | 0.50% |
| 2022 | 284 | 39.72% | 431 | 60.28% | 0 | 0.00% |

Georgia Gubernatorial election results for Taliaferro County
| Year | Republican | | Democratic | | Third party(ies) | |
| Year | No. | % | No. | % | No. | % |
|---|---|---|---|---|---|---|
| 2022 | 327 | 40.52% | 477 | 59.11% | 3 | 0.37% |

== Education ==
Public education is provided by the Taliaferro County School District.

== Notable people ==
- Romulus Moore
- Maude Andrews Ohl (1862–1943), journalist, poet, novelist
- Alexander H. Stephens

== See also ==
- Central Savannah River Area
- National Register of Historic Places listings in Taliaferro County, Georgia
- List of counties in Georgia
