= Crawfordville, Georgia =

City in Georgia, United States

- City
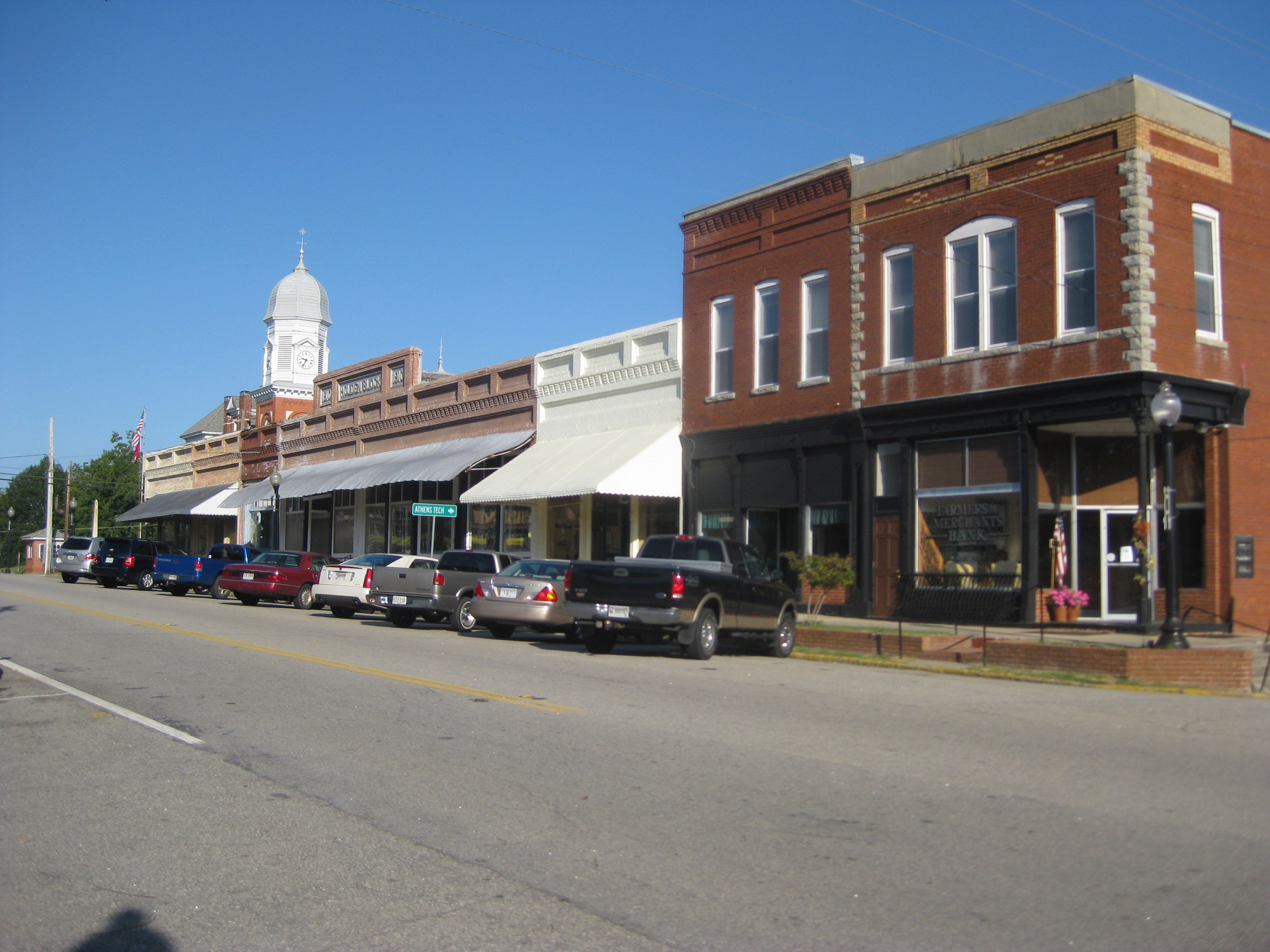
- Broad Street storefronts in downtown Crawfordville, Georgia, with Taliaferro County Courthouse in the distance

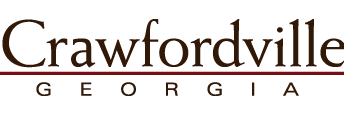
- Logo

- Location in Taliaferro County and the state of Georgia
- Coordinates: 33°33′17″N 82°53′54″W
- Country: United States
- State: Georgia
- County: Taliaferro

Government
  - Mayor: Vivian Stewart

Area
  - Total: 3.14 sq mi (8.12 km^{2})
  - Land: 3.12 sq mi (8.07 km^{2})
  - Water: 0.019 sq mi (0.05 km^{2})
- Elevation: 614 ft (187 m)

Population (2020)
  - Total: 479
  - Density: 153.8/sq mi (59.37/km^{2})
- Time zone: UTC-5 (Eastern (EST))
  - Summer (DST): UTC-4 (EDT)
- ZIP code: 30631
- Area code: 706
- FIPS code: 13-20316
- GNIS feature ID: 0313097
- Website: crawfordvillega.org

- Crawfordville Historic District
- U.S. National Register of Historic Places
- U.S. Historic district
- Location within Georgia Location within the United States
- Location: Roughly centered on the downtown business district of Crawfordville, Taliaferro, Georgia
- Area: 1,738 acres (703 ha)
- Built: 1826
- Built by: Charles Golucke/Golucke & Son, Julius Kendrick, J.H. McKenzie & Son (Taliaferro County Courthouse), others
- Architect: Lewis F. Goodrich (Taliaferro County Courthouse)
- Architectural style: Mid 19th Century Revival, Late Victorian
- NRHP reference No.: 06000124
- Added to NRHP: March 14, 2006

Crawfordville is a city in and the county seat of Taliaferro County, Georgia, United States. The population was 479 in 2020.

== History ==
Crawfordville was founded in 1825 as the seat of the newly formed Taliaferro County. It was incorporated as a town in 1826 and as a city in 1906. The community was named after William H. Crawford (1772–1834), U.S. Secretary of War and Secretary of the Treasury.

== Geography ==
Crawfordville is located at 33°33′17″N 82°53′54″W (33.554626, -82.898428). According to the United States Census Bureau, the city has a total area of 3.1 square miles (8.0 km^{2}), all land.

== Demographics ==
Historical population
Census	Pop.	Note	%±
1880	511		—
1890	584		14.3%
1900	597		2.2%
1910	688		15.2%
1920	784		14.0%
1930	840		7.1%
1940	1,056		25.7%
1950	966		−8.5%
1960	786		−18.6%
1970	735		−6.5%
1980	594		−19.2%
1990	577		−2.9%
2000	572		−0.9%
2010	534		−6.6%
2020	479		−10.3%
U.S. Decennial Census

=== Racial and ethnic composition ===
Crawfordville city, Georgia – Racial and ethnic composition Note: the US Census treats Hispanic/Latino as an ethnic category. This table excludes Latinos from the racial categories and assigns them to a separate category. Hispanics/Latinos may be of any race.
Race / Ethnicity (NH = Non-Hispanic)	Pop 2000	Pop 2010	Pop 2020	% 2000	% 2010	% 2020
White alone (NH)	237	192	169	41.43%	35.96%	35.28%
Black or African American alone (NH)	326	319	277	56.99%	59.74%	57.83%
Native American or Alaska Native alone (NH)	0	1	0	0.00%	0.19%	0.00%
Asian alone (NH)	0	4	3	0.00%	0.75%	0.63%
Native Hawaiian or Pacific Islander alone (NH)	0	0	0	0.00%	0.00%	0.00%
Other race alone (NH)	3	0	0	0.52%	0.00%	0.00%
Mixed race or Multiracial (NH)	3	10	21	0.52%	1.87%	4.38%
Hispanic or Latino (any race)	3	8	9	0.52%	1.50%	1.88%
Total	572	534	479	100.00%	100.00%	100.00%

== Education ==
=== Taliaferro County School District ===
The Taliaferro County School District consists of one charter school offering pre-school to grade twelve. As of 2023, the district had 26 full-time teachers and 187 students. Their Mascot is the Jaguars.

== Attractions ==
Crawfordville was the birthplace and home of Alexander H. Stephens, who served as a U.S. Congressman, Governor of Georgia, and most notably as Vice President of the Confederate States of America, 1861–1865. Stephens' home, Liberty Hall, is preserved as a museum and is a part of the A. H. Stephens Historic Park, a Georgia State Park located in Crawfordville.

Crawfordville is also the birthplace of Michael H. Rhodes, a radio and television personality that worked for Seattle based KING broadcasting during the 1940s–1980s alongside other famous Northwest greats: JP Patches and Stan Boreson.

The movie Sweet Home Alabama was partially filmed in Crawfordville. It includes the historical Taliaferro County Courthouse in one scene, as well as a scene with Reese Witherspoon walking down Main Street.

The films Coward of the County with Kenny Rogers, Get Low with Robert Duvall, Gorp, and the 1978 TV movie Summer of My German Soldier were filmed in Crawfordville.

== See also ==
- Central Savannah River Area
