= 1852 United States House of Representatives election in Florida =

- October 5, 1852
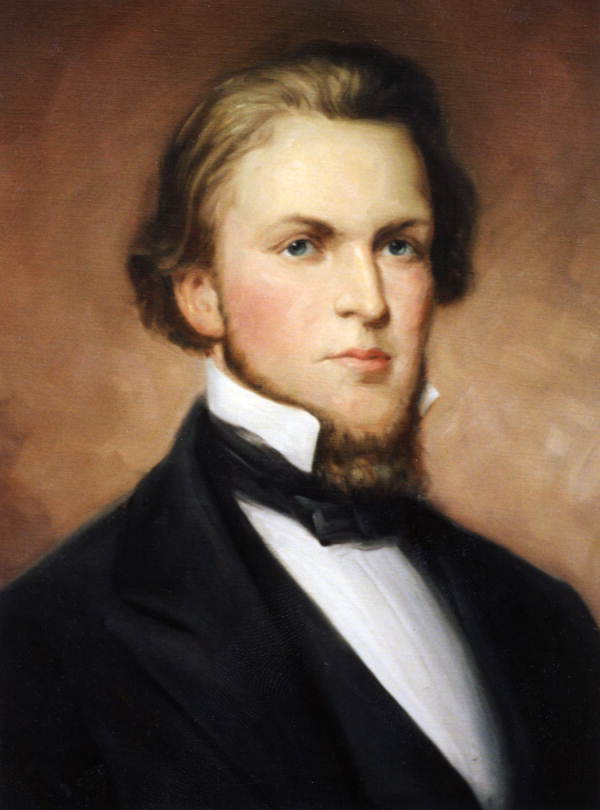

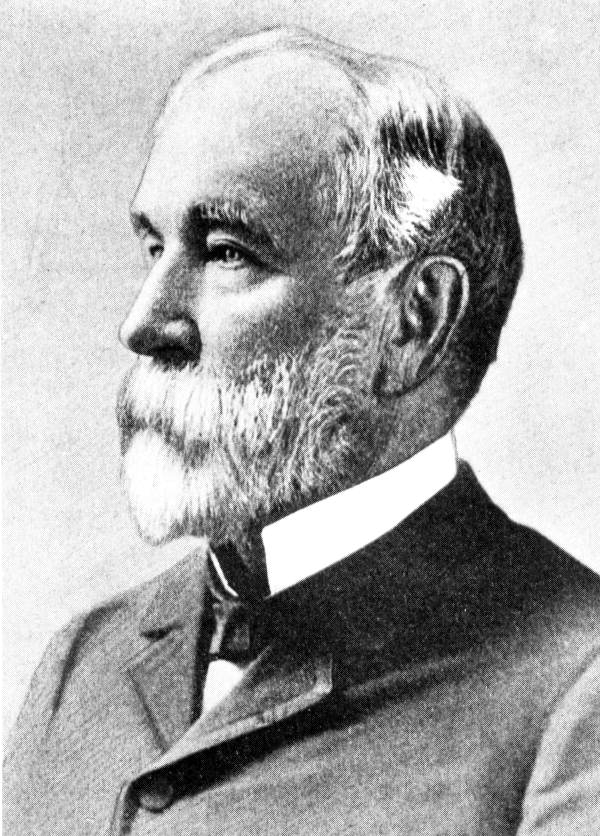
Nominee	Augustus Maxwell	Edward Carrington Cabell
Party	Democratic	Whig
Popular vote	4,590	4,568
Percentage	50.12%	49.88%
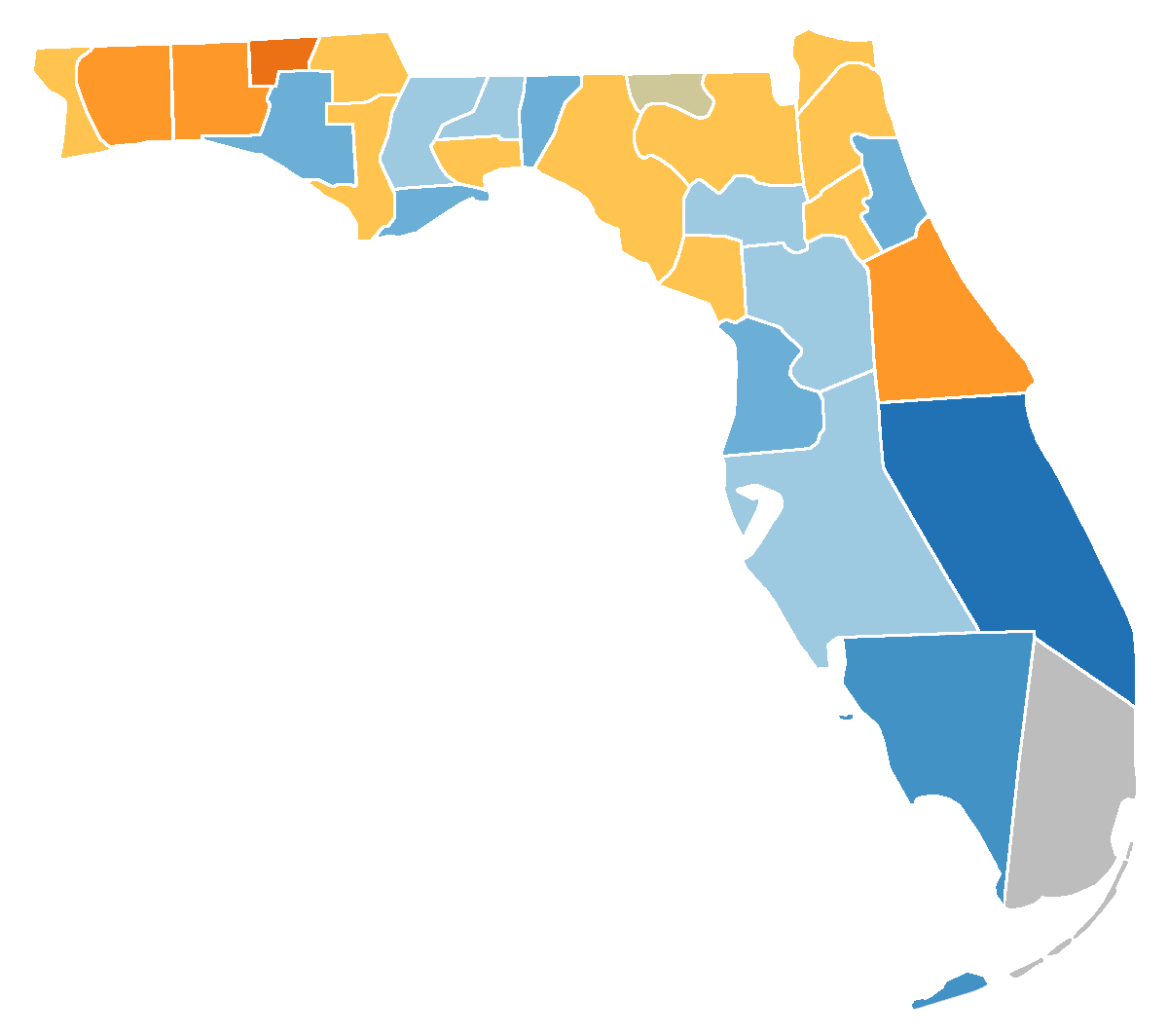
County results
Maxwell
50–59%
60–69%
70–79%
80–89%
Cabell
50–59%
60–69%
70–79%
Tie
Tie
No Votes
No Votes
Representative before election
Edward Carrington Cabell
Whig
Elected Representative
Augustus Maxwell
Democratic

The 1852 United States House of Representatives election in Florida was held on Tuesday, October 5, 1852, to elect the single United States Representative from the state of Florida, one from the state's single at-large congressional district, to represent Florida in the 33rd Congress. The election coincided with the elections of other offices, including the presidential election, the gubernatorial election, and various state and local elections.

The winning candidate would serve a two-year term in the United States House of Representatives from March 4, 1853, to March 4, 1855.

== Candidates ==
=== Whig ===
==== Nominee ====
- Edward Carrington Cabell, incumbent U.S. representative

=== Democratic ===
==== Nominee ====
- Augustus Maxwell, former state senator and former Florida Attorney General

== Campaign ==
Despite a very popular tenure as a compromise candidate, by 1852, Cabell became very unpopular among Democrats in Florida after a number of smear campaigns accused him of supporting abolitionism. In reality, Cabell was one of Congress' biggest supporters of slavery, and was one of the spearheads behind the Compromise of 1850. Cabell also refused to support the Whig candidate for president, General Winfield Scott, as Scott was perceived to be a trojan horse for abolitionism among many Southern Whigs, most of whom supported President Millard Fillmore at the 1852 Whig National Convention. Cabell opted instead to support the Democratic candidate, former New Hampshire Senator Franklin Pierce, drawing the ire of many staunch Whig supporters in Pensacola.

By the time of the election, after guaranteeing that no Democrat would vote for him and Whig turnout for him would be significantly lower, Cabell narrowly lost the election to Maxwell by just 22 votes.

== General election ==
=== Results ===
Florida's at-large congressional district election, 1852
Party	Candidate	Votes	%	±%
Democratic	Augustus Maxwell	4,590	50.12%	+3.64%
Whig	Edward Carrington Cabell (inc.)	4,568	49.88%	−3.64%
Majority		22	0.24%	−6.81%
Turnout		9,158	100.00%	
Democratic gain from Whig				

=== Results by County ===
County	Augustus Maxwell Democratic		Edward Carrington Cabell Whig		Total votes
County	#	%	#	%	Total votes
Alachua	231	58.63%	163	41.37%	394
Calhoun	78	43.09%	103	56.91%	181
Columbia	255	47.22%	285	52.78%	540
Dade*	0	0%	0	0%	0
Duval	275	45.30%	332	54.70%	607
Escambia	212	45.89%	250	54.11%	462
Franklin	167	65.23%	89	34.77%	256
Gadsden	432	50.76%	419	49.24%	851
Hamilton	159	50.00%	159	50.00%	318
Hernando	106	61.63%	66	38.37%	172
Hillsborough	189	59.62%	128	40.38%	317
Holmes	39	25.83%	112	74.17%	151
Jackson	248	40.39%	366	59.61%	614
Jefferson	268	64.11%	150	35.89%	418
Leon	395	54.33%	332	45.67%	727
Levy	32	42.67%	43	57.33%	75
Madison	254	44.33%	319	55.67%	573
Marion	253	50.91%	244	49.09%	497
Monroe	160	70.80%	66	29.20%	223
Nassau	57	48.31%	61	51.69%	118
Orange	27	39.71%	41	60.29%	68
Putnam	55	42.64%	74	57.36%	129
Santa Rosa	167	39.39%	257	60.61%	424
St. Johns	138	60.26%	91	39.74%	229
St. Lucie	7	87.50%	1	12.50%	8
Wakulla	151	47.94%	164	52.06%	315
Walton	111	39.36%	171	60.64%	282
Washington	124	60.19%	82	39.81%	206
Totals	4,590	50.12%	4,568	49.88%	9,158
*Dade County had no returns.

== See also ==
- 1852 United States presidential election in Florida
- United States House of Representatives elections, 1852
- 1852 Florida gubernatorial election
