= 1852 Florida gubernatorial election =

- October 4, 1852
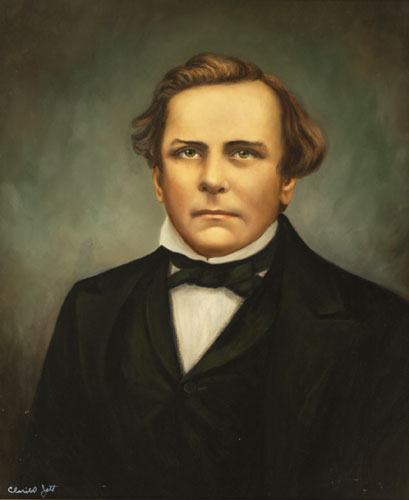

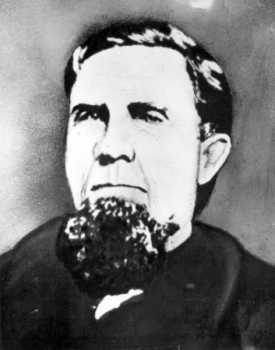
Nominee	James E. Broome	George T. Ward
Party	Democratic	Whig
Popular vote	4,457	4,246
Percentage	51.21%	48.79%
County results
Broome:
50–60%
60–70%
>90%
Ward:
50–60%
60–70%
70–80%
No Votes:
No Votes
Governor before election
Thomas Brown
Whig
Elected Governor
James E. Broome
Democratic

The 1852 Florida gubernatorial election was held on October 4, 1852. Democratic nominee James E. Broome defeated the Whig nominee George T. Ward.

The election was only decided by a slim 211 vote margin.

== General election ==
=== Candidates ===
==== Democratic ====
- James E . Broome

==== Whig ====
- George T. Ward

=== Results ===
1852 Florida gubernatorial election
Party	Candidate	Votes	%	±%
Democratic	James E. Broome	4,457	51.21%	
Whig	George T. Ward	4,246	48.79%	

=== Results by County ===
County	James E . Broome Democratic		George T. Ward Whig		Total votes
County	#	%	#	%	Total votes
Alachua	238	59.80%	160	40.20%	398
Calhoun	79	52.32%	72	47.68%	151
Columbia	314	52.51%	284	47.49%	598
Dade*	0	0%	0	0%	0
Duval	274	44.55%	341	55.45%	615
Escambia	225	49.02%	234	50.98%	459
Franklin	168	64.62%	92	35.38%	260
Gadsden	458	53.26%	402	46.74%	860
Hamilton	168	53.16%	148	46.84%	316
Hernando	106	63.47%	61	36.53%	167
Hillsborough	196	61.25%	124	38.75%	320
Holmes	39	25.83%	112	74.17%	151
Jackson	253	40.87%	366	59.13%	619
Jefferson	273	64.69%	149	35.31%	422
Leon	378	52.14%	347	47.86%	725
Levy	5	100%	0	0%	5
Madison	251	44.35%	315	55.65%	566
Marion	267	52.77%	239	47.23%	506
Monroe	154	67.54%	74	32.46%	228
Nassau	57	48.72%	60	51.28%	117
Orange	31	43.66%	40	56.34%	71
Putnam	56	43.08%	74	56.92%	130
Santa Rosa	152	39.07%	237	60.93%	389
St. Johns	139	59.40%	95	40.60%	234
St. Lucie	6	100%	0	0%	0
Wakulla	127	41.10%	182	58.90%	309
Walton	123	43.31%	161	56.69%	284
Washington	130	62.20%	79	37.80%	209
Actual Totals	4,667	51.20%	4,448	48.80%	9,115
Official Totals**	4,457	51.21%	4,246	48.79%	8,703
*Dade County had no returns. **Official results from the State of Florida is different from actual results

== See also ==
- 1852 United States presidential election in Florida
- 1852 United States House of Representatives election in Florida
