= 1852 United States presidential election in Florida =

- November 2, 1852

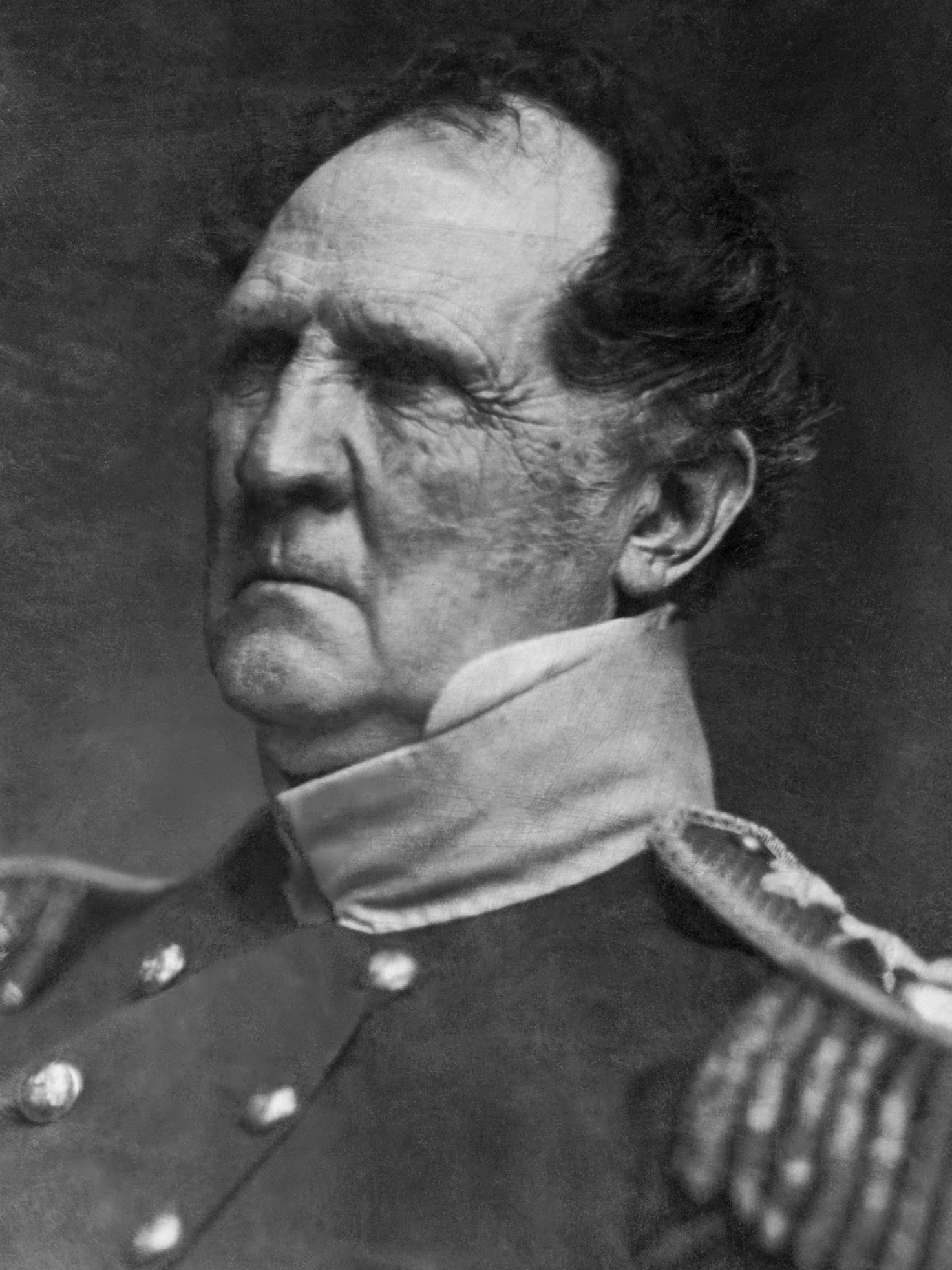
Nominee	Franklin Pierce	Winfield Scott
Party	Democratic	Whig
Home state	New Hampshire	New Jersey
Running mate	William R. King	William Alexander Graham
Electoral vote	3	0
Popular vote	4,318	2,875
Percentage	60.03%	39.97%
County results
Pierce
50–60%
60–70%
70–80%
80–90%
90–100%
Scott
50–60%
60–70%
Tie
50%
President before election
Millard Fillmore
Whig
Elected President
Franklin Pierce
Democratic

The 1852 United States presidential election in Florida took place on November 2, 1852, as part of the 1852 United States presidential election. Voters chose three representatives, or electors to the Electoral College, who voted for President and Vice President.

== Results ==
Democrat Franklin Pierce defeated Whig Party candidate Winfield Scott by a margin of 20.06% or 1,443 votes. Pierce won all of Florida's 3 electoral votes and was the first Democrat to win the state.

General election results, November 2, 1852
Party	Candidate	Votes	%
Democratic	Franklin Pierce	4,318	60.03%
Whig	Winfield Scott	2,875	39.97%
Total votes		7,193	100%

=== Results by County ===
County	Franklin Pierce Democratic		Winfield Scott Whig		Margin		Total votes cast
County	#	%	#	%	#	%	Total votes cast
Alachua	209	65.31%	111	34.69%	98	30.63%	320
Calhoun	61	82.43%	13	17.57%	48	64.86%	74
Columbia	337	63.11%	197	36.89%	140	26.22%	534
Dade	0	0.00%	0	0.00%	0	0.00%	0
Duval	314	53.40%	274	46.60%	40	6.80%	588
Escambia	213	51.33%	202	48.67%	11	2.66%	415
Franklin	173	66.54%	87	33.46%	86	33.08%	260
Gadsden	306	64.29%	170	35.71%	136	28.58%	476
Hamilton	117	81.25%	27	18.75%	90	62.50%	144
Hernando	93	66.43%	47	33.57%	46	32.86%	140
Hillsborough	165	70.21%	70	29.79%	95	40.42%	235
Holmes	59	44.70%	73	55.30%	-14	-10.60%	132
Jackson	261	50.10%	260	49.90%	1	0.20%	521
Jefferson	320	79.01%	85	20.99%	235	58.02%	405
Leon	384	62.85%	227	37.15%	157	25.70%	611
Levy	43	61.43%	27	38.57%	16	22.86%	70
Madison	183	64.44%	101	35.56%	82	28.88%	284
Marion	206	60.06%	137	39.94%	69	20.12%	343
Monroe	116	54.98%	95	45.02%	21	9.96%	211
Nassau	29	37.66%	48	62.34%	-19	-24.68%	77
Orange	35	50.00%	35	50.00%	0	0.00%	70
Putnam	47	55.95%	37	44.05%	10	11.90%	84
Santa Rosa	159	42.18%	218	57.82%	-59	-15.64%	377
St. Johns	140	59.07%	97	40.93%	43	18.14%	237
St. Lucie	7	100.00%	0	0.00%	7	100.00%	7
Wakulla	154	63.11%	90	36.89%	64	26.22%	244
Walton	78	40.84%	113	59.16%	-35	-18.32%	191
Washington	109	76.22%	34	23.78%	75	52.44%	143
Totals	4,318	60.03%	2,875	39.97%	1,443	20.06%	7,193

== See also ==
- United States presidential elections in Florida
- 1852 Florida gubernatorial election
- 1852 United States House of Representatives election in Florida
