= 1852 United States presidential election =

Election of Franklin Pierce

- November 2, 1852

296 members of the Electoral College 149 electoral votes needed to win
- Turnout: 69.5% (▼3.3 pp)

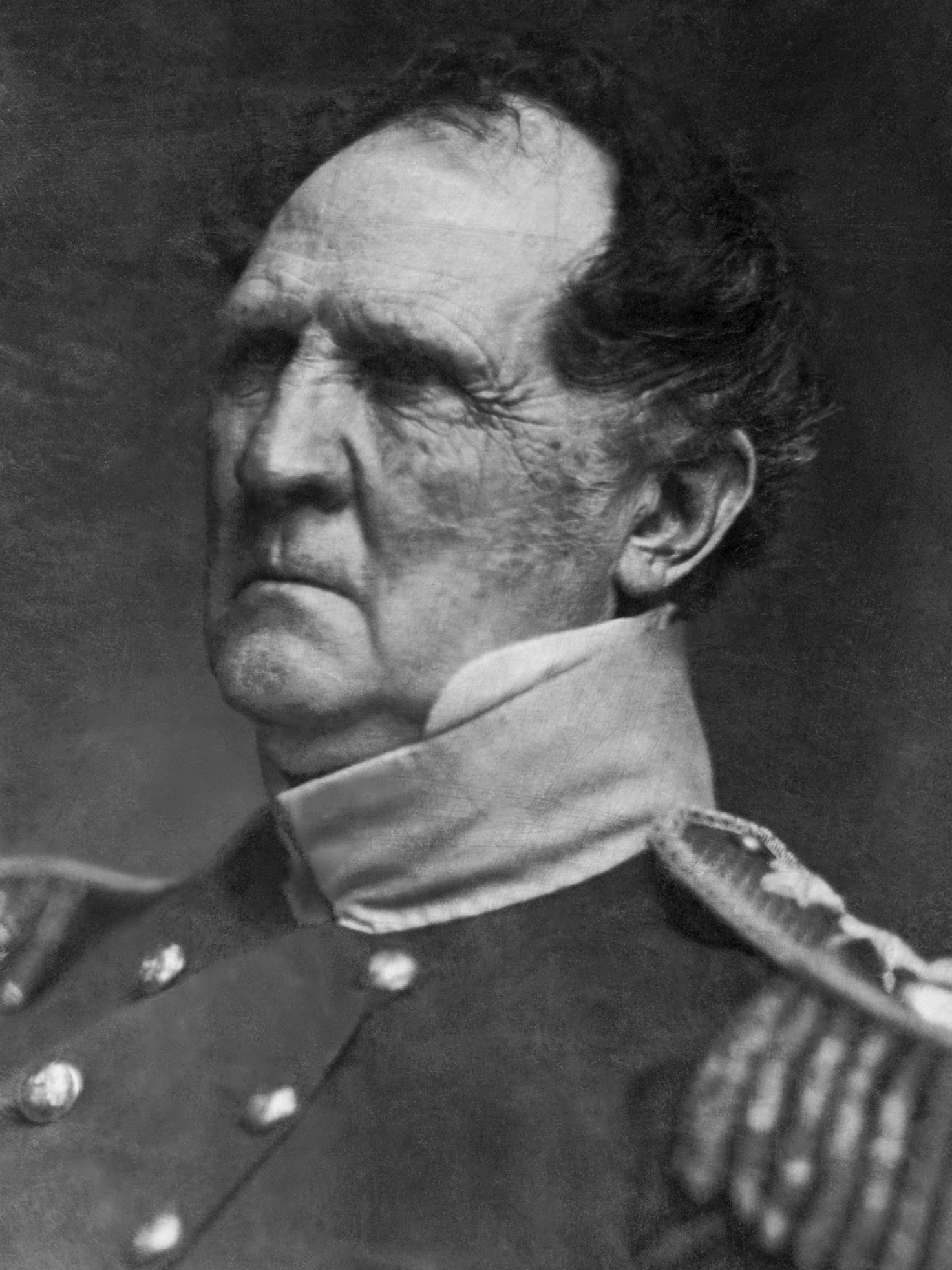
| Nominee | Franklin Pierce | Winfield Scott |
| Party | Democratic | Whig |
| Alliance | Union Democratic; Georgia Southern Rights |
| Home state | New Hampshire | New Jersey |
| Running mate | William R. King | William Alexander Graham |
| Electoral vote | 254 | 42 |
| States carried | 27 | 4 |
| Popular vote | 1,604,167 (Note: Including votes for both the SRP-backed and Anti-SRP tickets) | 1,385,255 |
| Percentage | 50.8% | 43.9% |
- Presidential election results map. Blue denotes states won by Pierce/King and Buff by Scott/Graham. Numbers indicate the number of electoral votes cast by each state.
President before election
Millard Fillmore
Whig
Elected President
Franklin Pierce
Democratic

A presidential election was held in the United States on November 2, 1852. Democratic nominee Franklin Pierce defeated Whig nominee General Winfield Scott.

Incumbent Whig President Millard Fillmore had succeeded to the presidency in 1850 upon the death of President Zachary Taylor. Fillmore endorsed the Compromise of 1850 and enforced the Fugitive Slave Law. This earned Fillmore Southern voter support and Northern voter opposition. On the 53rd ballot of the sectionally divided 1852 Whig National Convention, Scott defeated Fillmore for the nomination. Democrats divided among four major candidates at the 1852 Democratic National Convention. On the 49th ballot, dark horse candidate Franklin Pierce won nomination by consensus compromise. The Free Soil Party, a third party opposed to the extension of slavery in the United States and into the territories, nominated New Hampshire Senator John P. Hale.

With few policy differences between the two major candidates, the election became a personality contest. Though Scott had commanded in the Mexican–American War, Pierce also served. Scott strained Whig Party unity as his anti-slavery reputation gravely damaged his campaign in the South. A group of Southern Whigs and a separate group of Southern Democrats each nominated insurgent tickets, but both efforts failed to attract support.

Pierce and running mate William R. King won a comfortable popular majority, carrying 27 of the 31 states. Pierce won the highest share of the electoral vote since James Monroe's uncontested 1820 re-election. The Free Soil Party regressed to less than five percent of the national popular vote, down from more than ten percent in 1848, while overwhelming defeat and disagreement about slavery soon drove the Whig Party to disintegrate. Anti-slavery Whigs and Free Soilers would ultimately coalesce into the new Republican Party, which would quickly become a formidable movement in the free states.

Not until 1876 would Democrats again win a majority of the popular vote for president, and not until 1932 would they win a majority in both the popular vote and the electoral college.

== Nominations ==
=== Democratic Party nomination ===
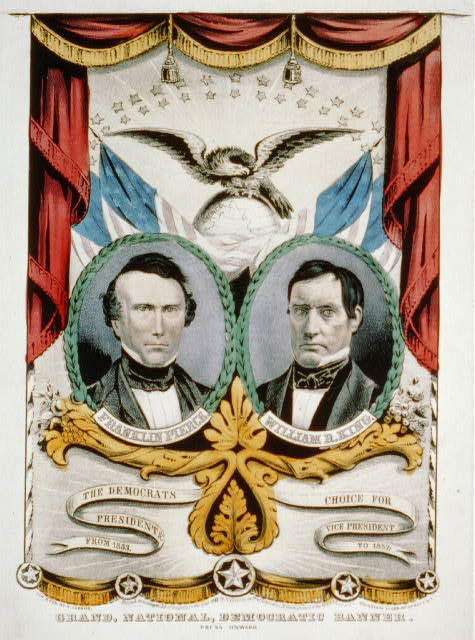
Pierce and King campaign poster

1852 Democratic Party ticket
| Franklin Pierce | William R. King |
| for President | for Vice President |
| U.S. senator from New Hampshire (1837–1842) | U.S. senator from Alabama (1819–1844 & 1848–1852) |

- Franklin Pierce, former U.S. senator from New Hampshire
- Lewis Cass, U.S. senator from Michigan
- James Buchanan, former U.S. secretary of state from Pennsylvania
- William L. Marcy, former U.S. secretary of war from New York
- Stephen A. Douglas, U.S. senator from Illinois
Former senator
Franklin Pierce
from New Hampshire

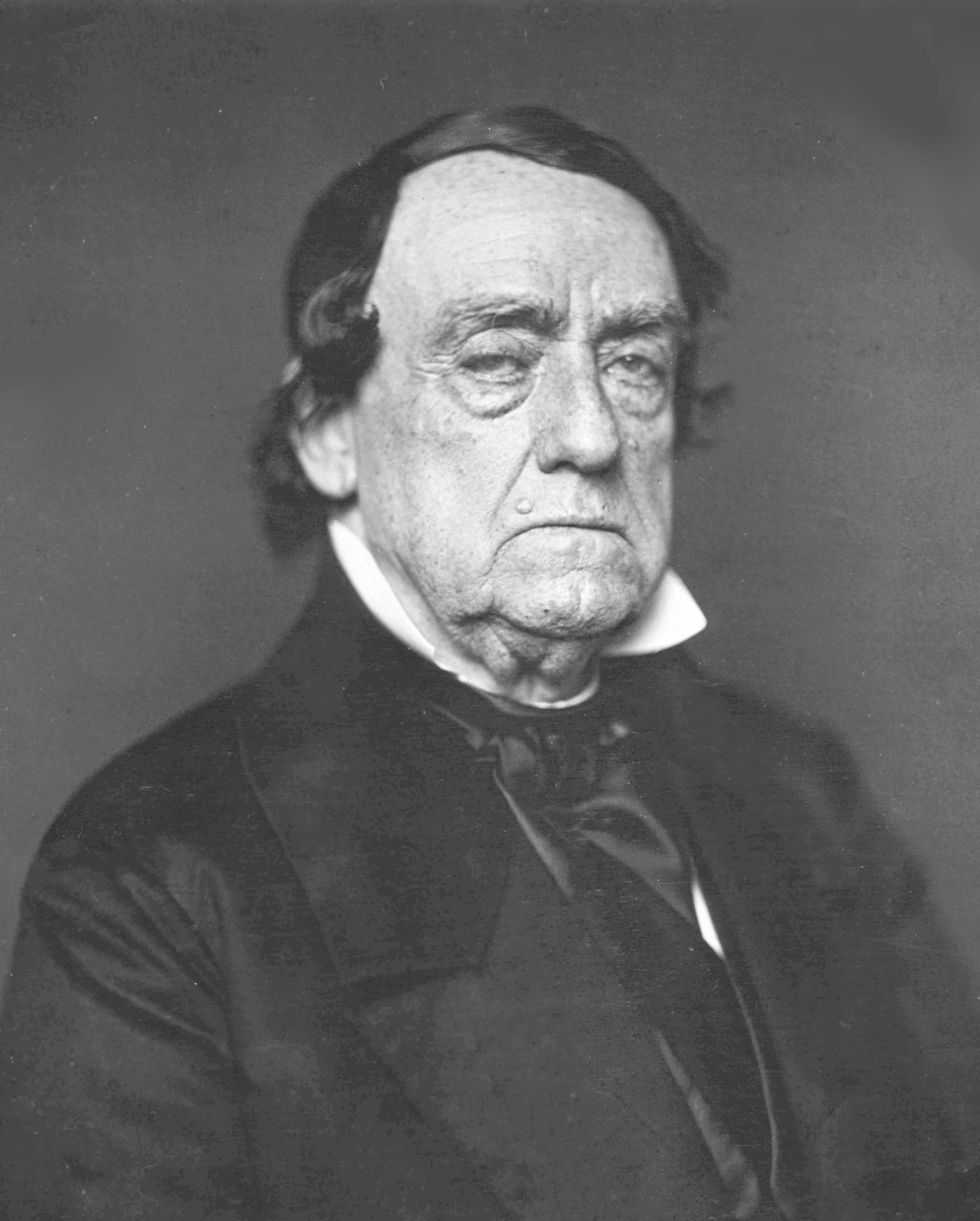
Senator
Lewis Cass
from Michigan

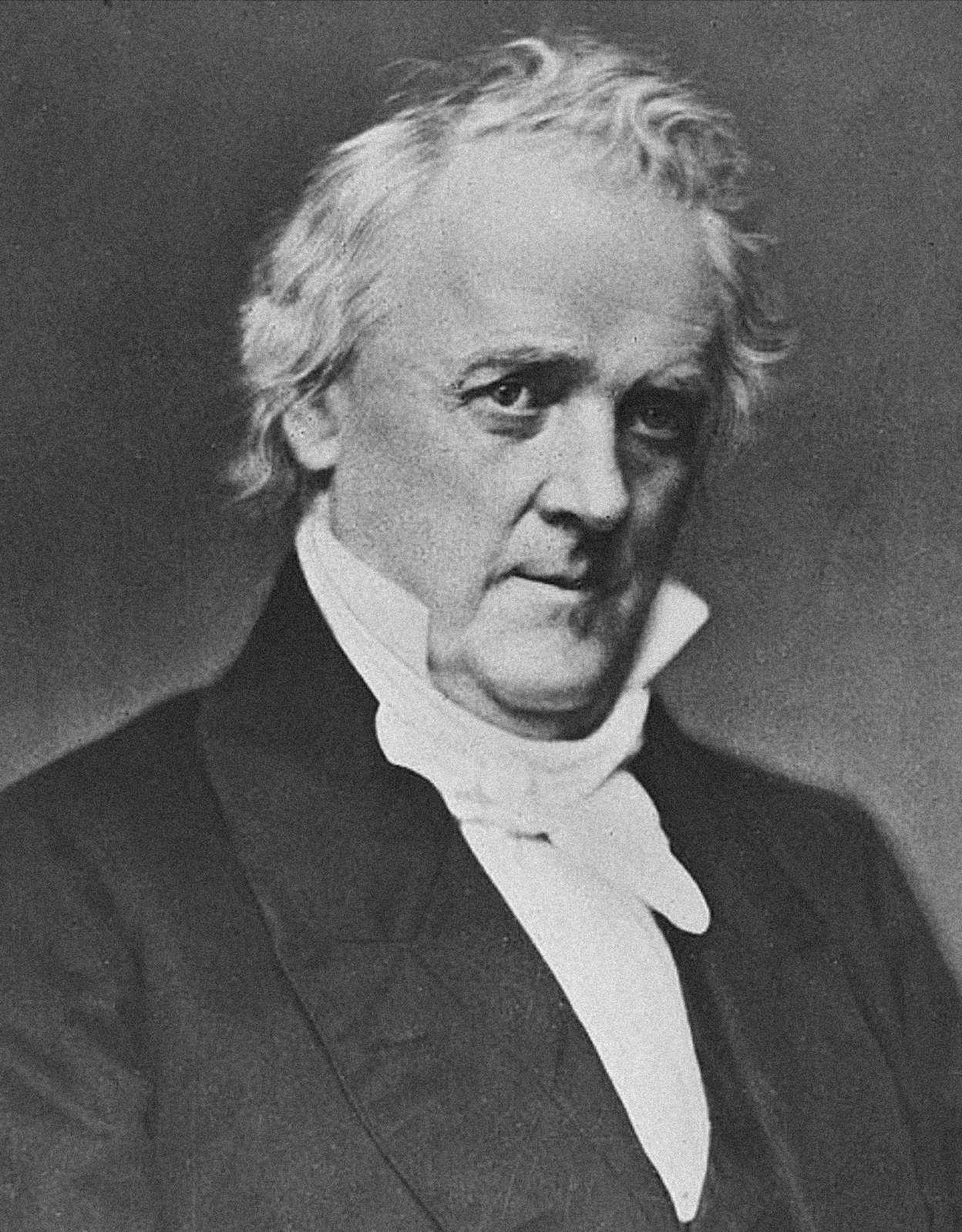
Former Secretary
of State
James Buchanan

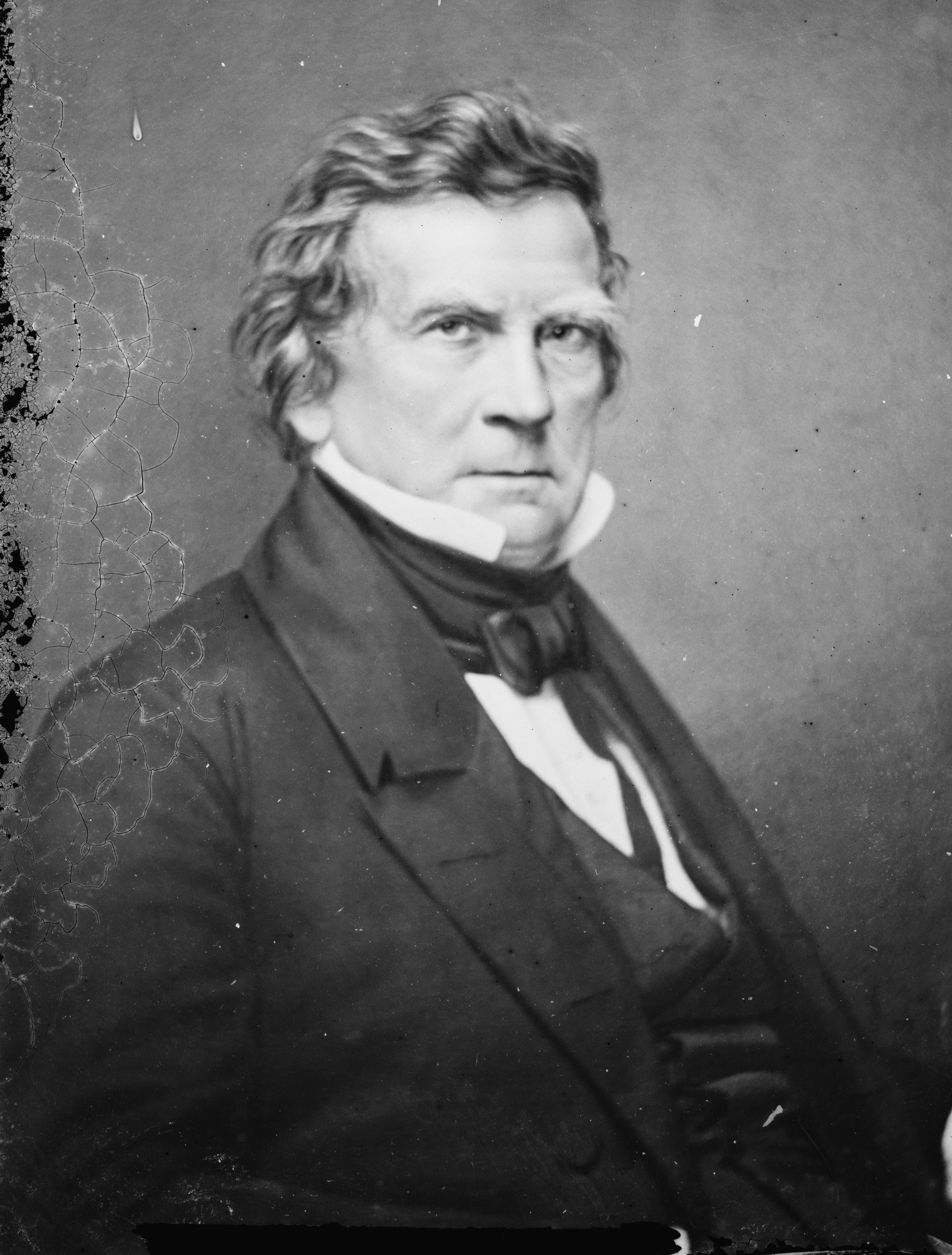
Former Secretary
of War
William L. Marcy

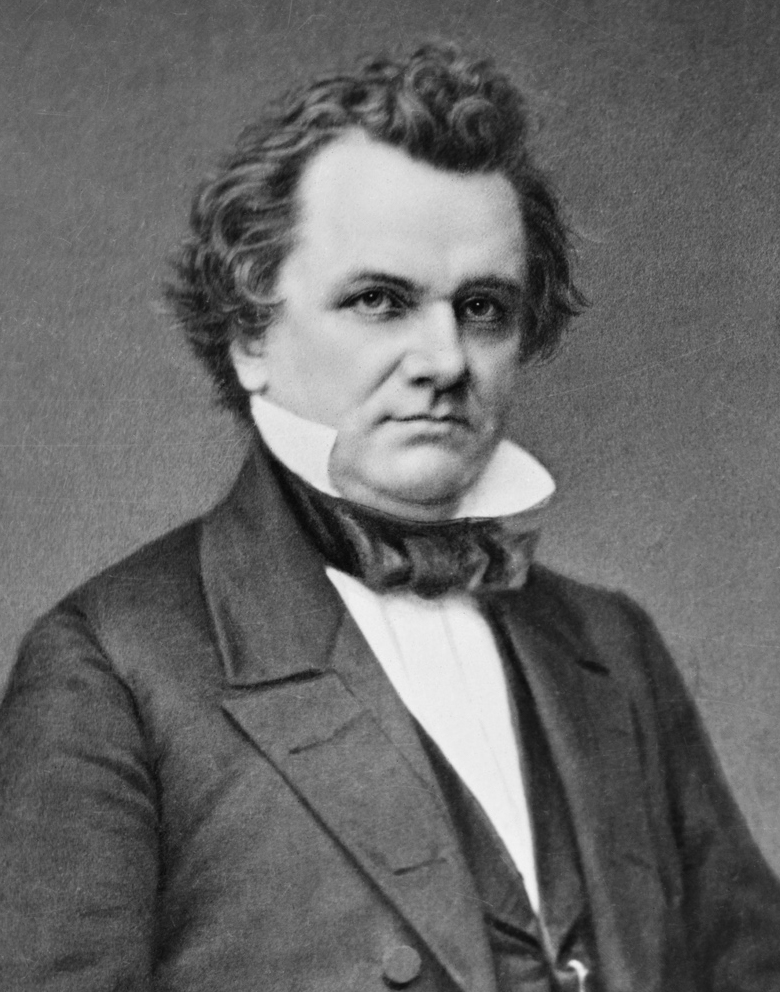
Senator
Stephen A. Douglas
from Illinois

The Democratic Party held its national convention in Baltimore, Maryland, in June 1852. Benjamin F. Hallett, the chair of the Democratic National Committee, limited the sizes of the delegations to their electoral votes and a vote to maintain the two-thirds requirement for the presidential and vice-presidential nomination was passed by a vote of 269 to 13.

James Buchanan, Lewis Cass, William L. Marcy, and Stephen A. Douglas were the main candidates for the nomination. All of the candidates led the ballot for the presidential nomination at one point, but all of them failed to meet the two-thirds requirement. Franklin Pierce was put up for the nomination by the Virginia delegation. Pierce won the nomination when the delegates switched their support to him after he had received the unanimous support of the delegates from New England. He won on the second day of balloting after forty-nine ballots.

The delegation from Maine proposed that the vice-presidential nomination should be given to somebody from the Southern United States with William R. King being specifically named. King led on the first ballot before winning on the second ballot.

=== Whig Party nomination ===
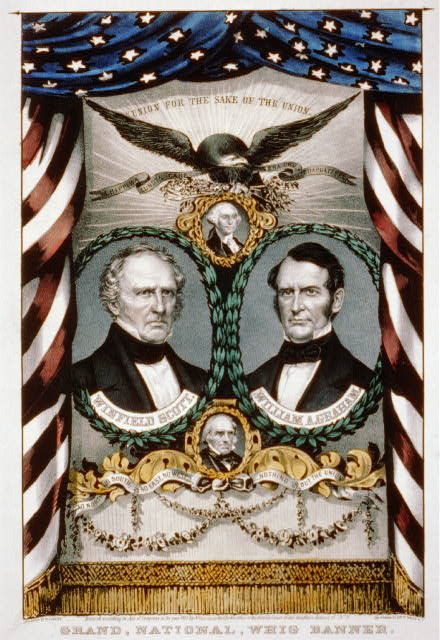
Scott and Graham campaign poster

1852 Whig Party ticket
| Winfield Scott | William Alexander Graham |
| for President | for Vice President |
| 3rd Commanding General of the U.S. Army (1841–1861) | 20th U.S. Secretary of the Navy (1850–1852) |

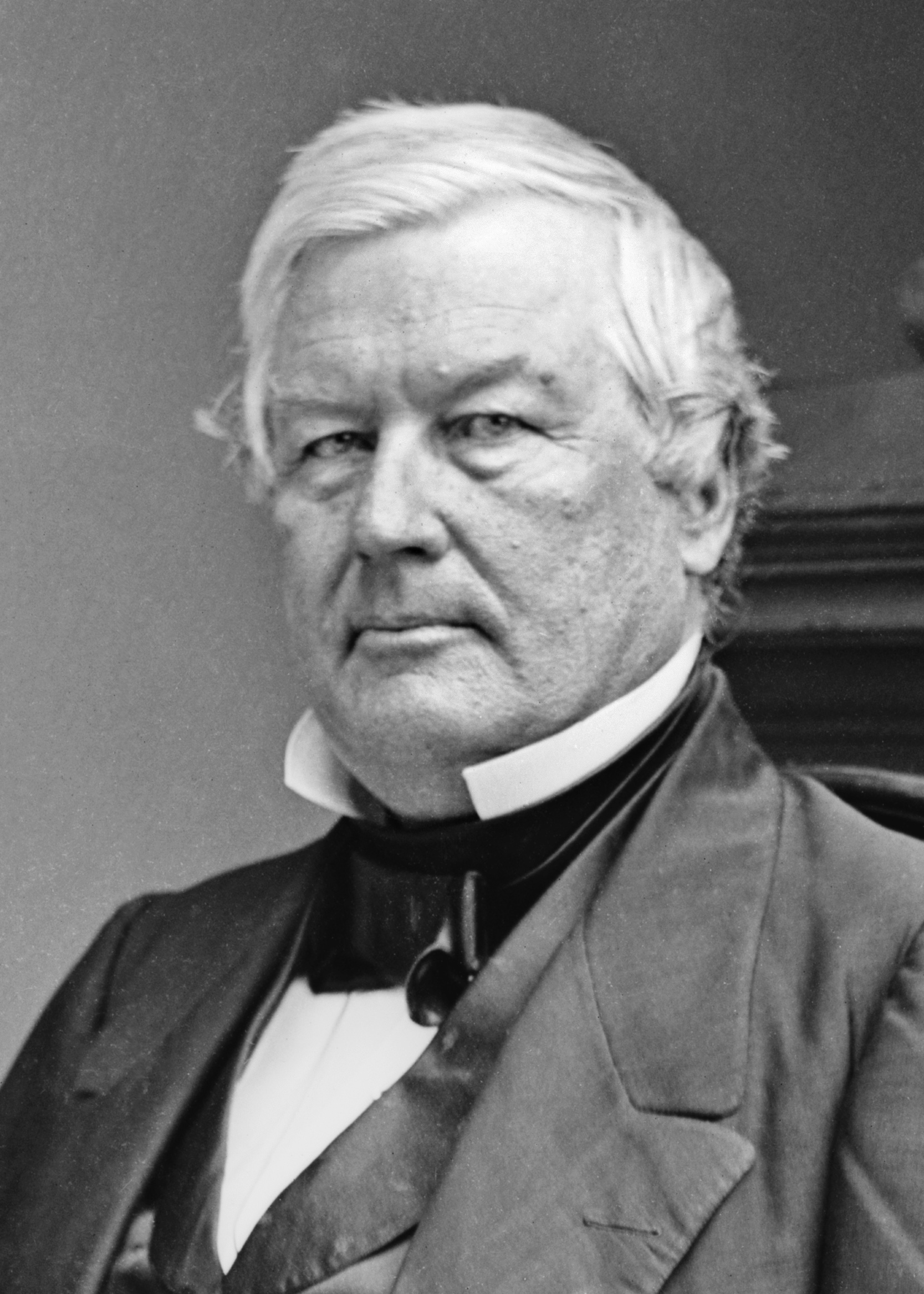
Millard Fillmore, the incumbent president in 1852, whose partial term expired on March 4, 1853

- Winfield Scott, commanding general of the U.S. Army from New Jersey
- Millard Fillmore, president of the United States from New York
- Daniel Webster, U.S. secretary of state from Massachusetts
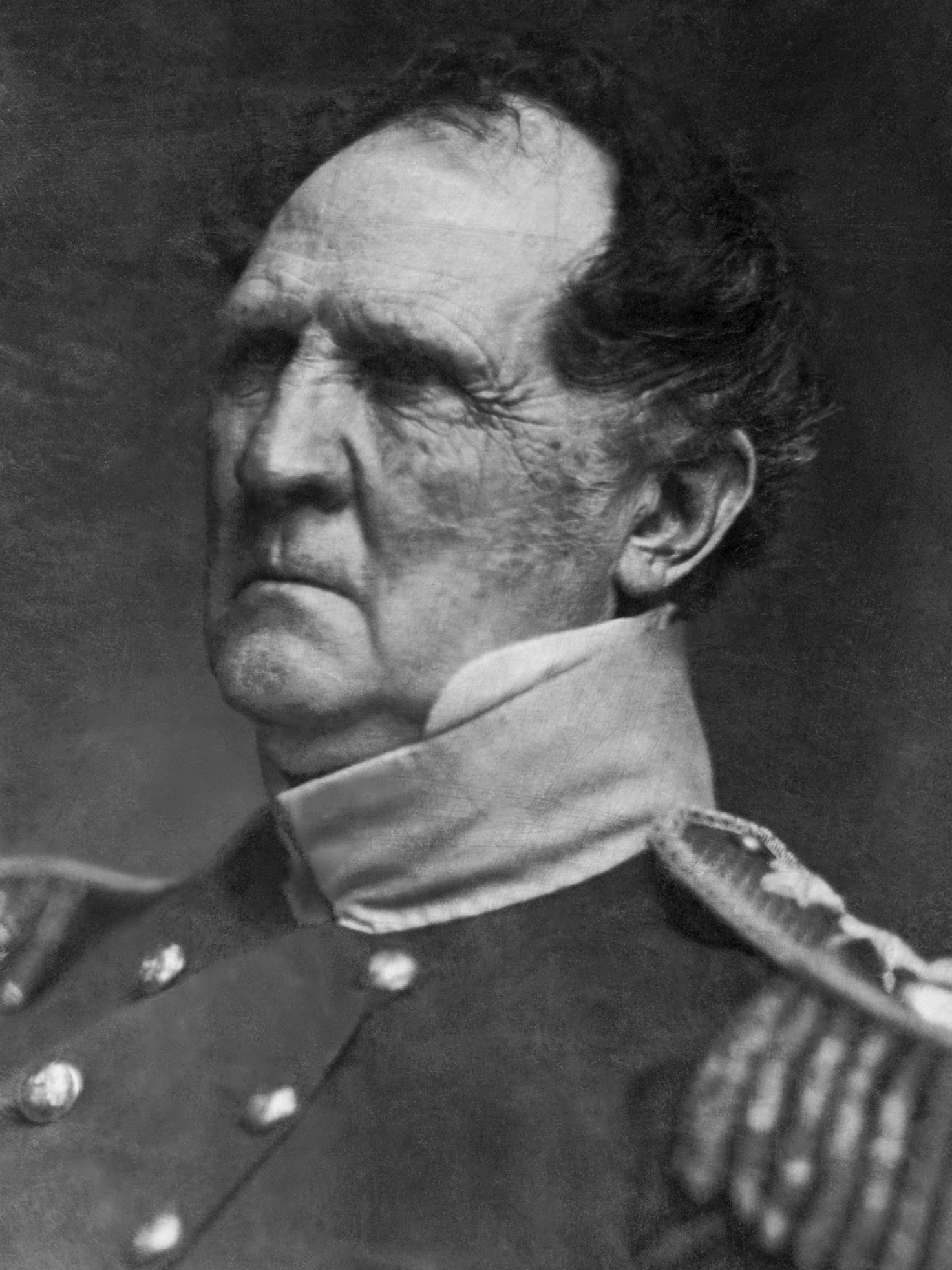
Commanding General
Winfield Scott

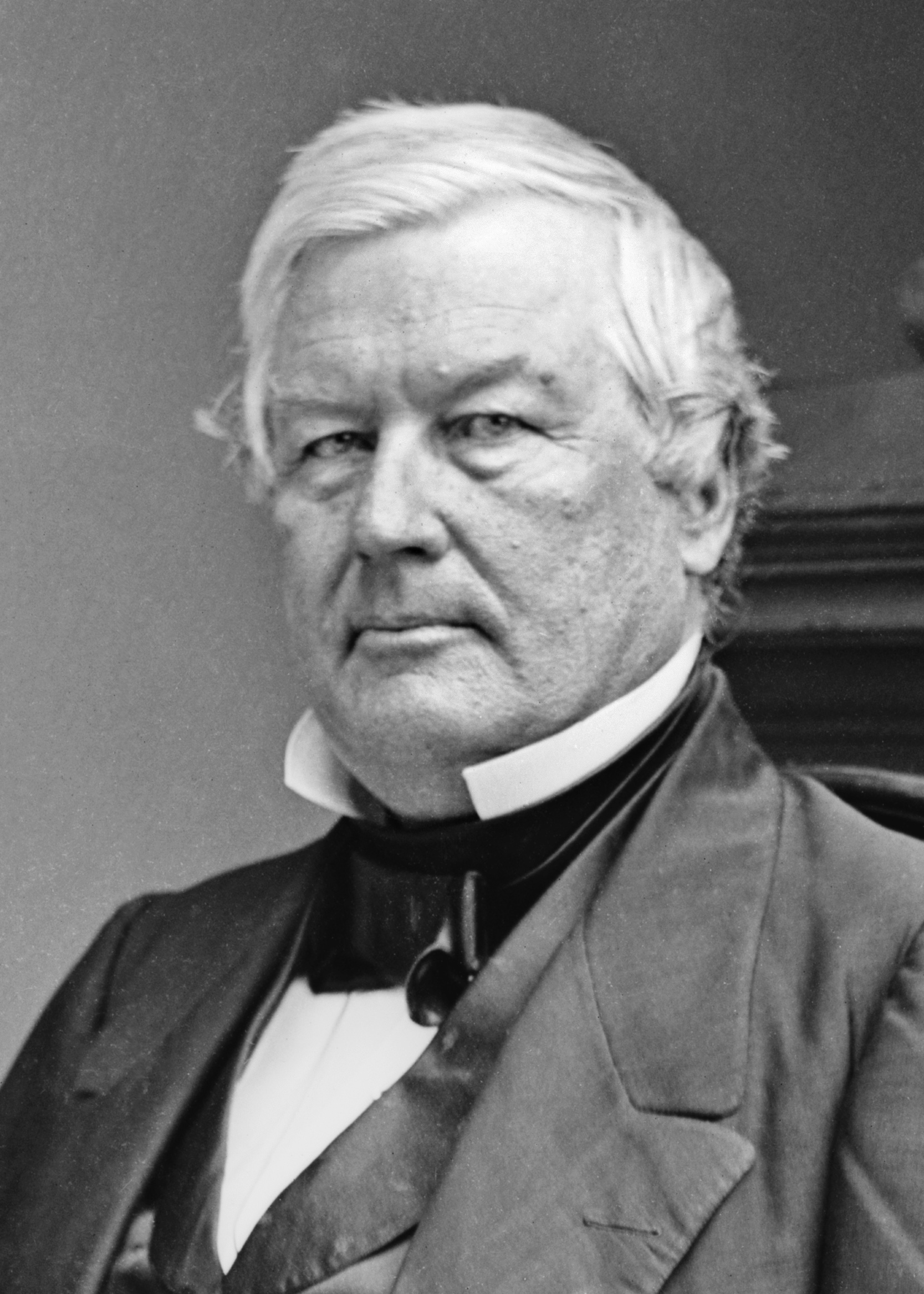
President
Millard Fillmore

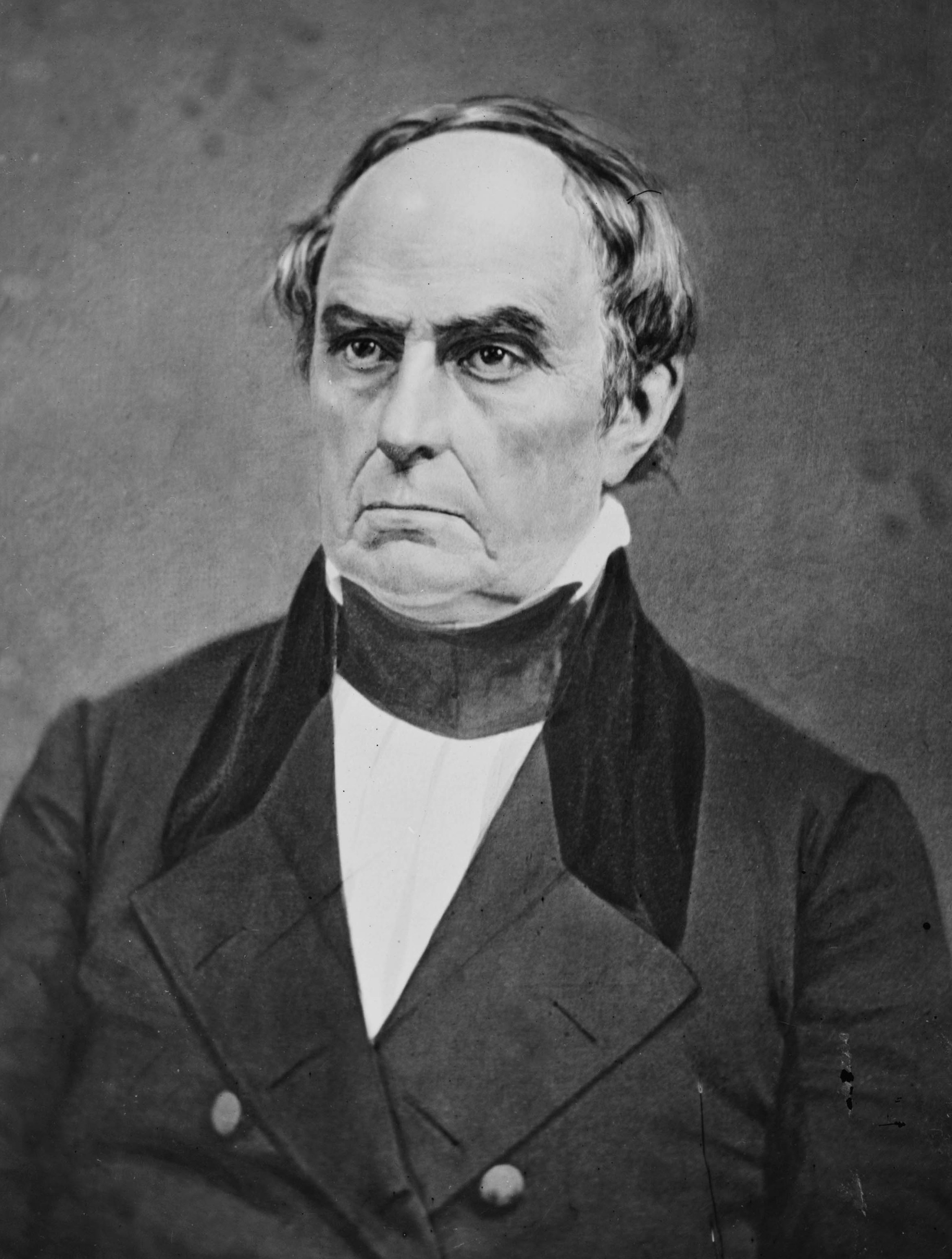
U.S. Secretary of State
Daniel Webster

The Whig Party held its national convention in Baltimore, Maryland, in June 1852. The call for the convention had been made by Whig members of the United States Congress and thirty-one states were represented. A vote to have each state's vote be based on its electoral college strength was passed by a vote of 149 to 144, but it was rescinded due to disagreements from the Southern states and smaller Northern states.

The party had been divided by the Compromise of 1850 and was divided over the presidential nomination between incumbent president Millard Fillmore, who received support from the South, and Winfield Scott, who received his support from the North. William H. Seward, who had been the main opponent of the compromise in the United States Senate and advised President Zachary Taylor against it, supported Scott. Fillmore offered to give his delegates to Daniel Webster if he received the support of forty-one delegates on his own, but Webster was unsuccessful. Scott won the nomination on the 53rd ballot. William Alexander Graham won the vice-presidential nomination without a formal vote.

Nine southern Whig members of Congress, including Alexander H. Stephens and Robert Toombs, refused to support Scott.

=== Free Soil Party nomination ===
- John P. Hale, U.S. senator from New Hampshire
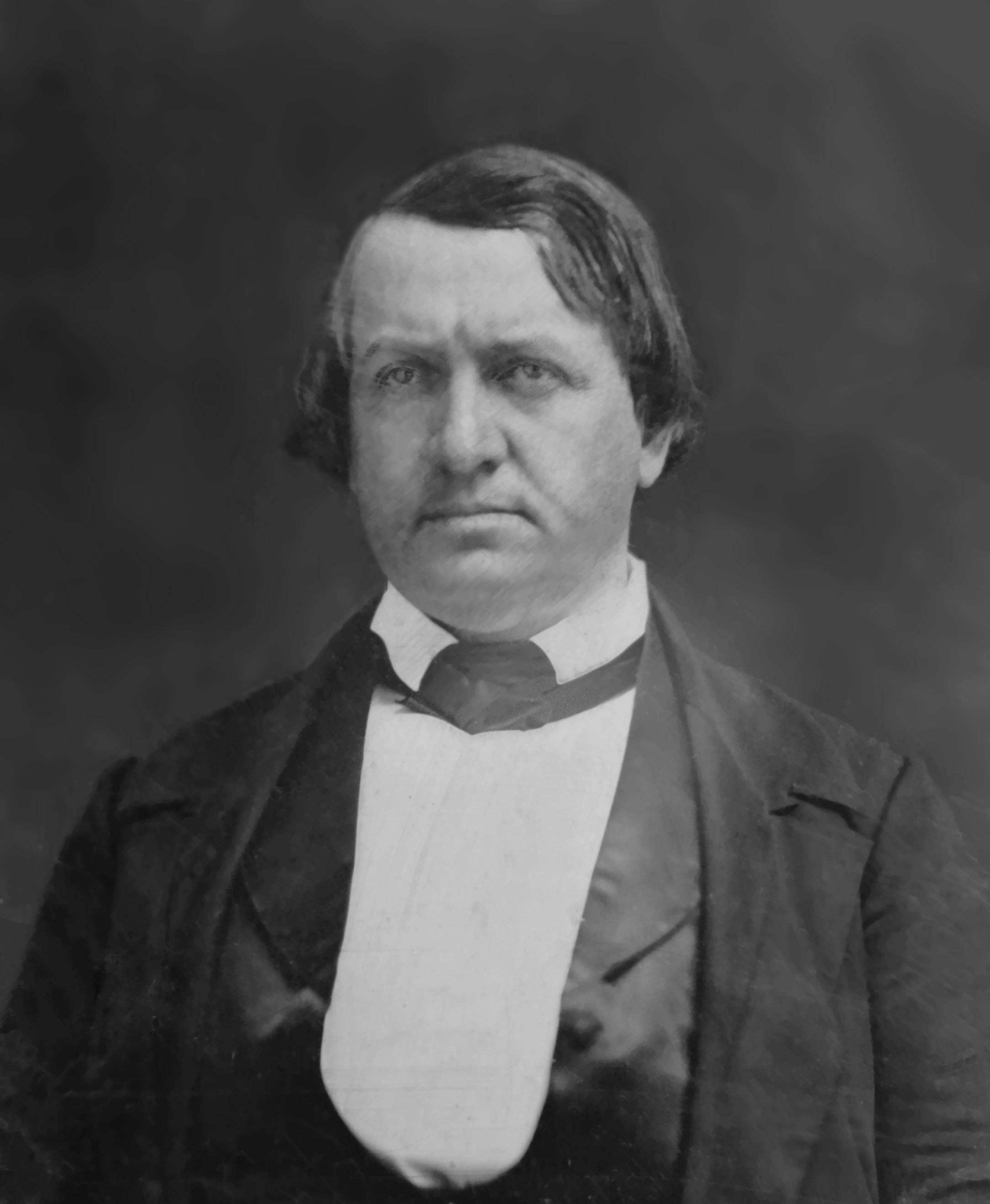
Senator John P. Hale
from New Hampshire

The Free Soil Party was still the strongest third party in 1852. However, following the Compromise of 1850, most of the "Barnburners" who supported it in 1848 had returned to the Democratic Party while most of the Conscience Whigs rejoined the Whig Party. The second Free Soil National Convention assembled in the Masonic Hall in Pittsburgh, Pennsylvania. New Hampshire senator John P. Hale was nominated for president with 192 delegate votes (sixteen votes were cast for a smattering of candidates). George W. Julian of Indiana was nominated for vice president over Samuel Lewis of Ohio and Joshua R. Giddings of Ohio.

=== Independent Whig nomination ===
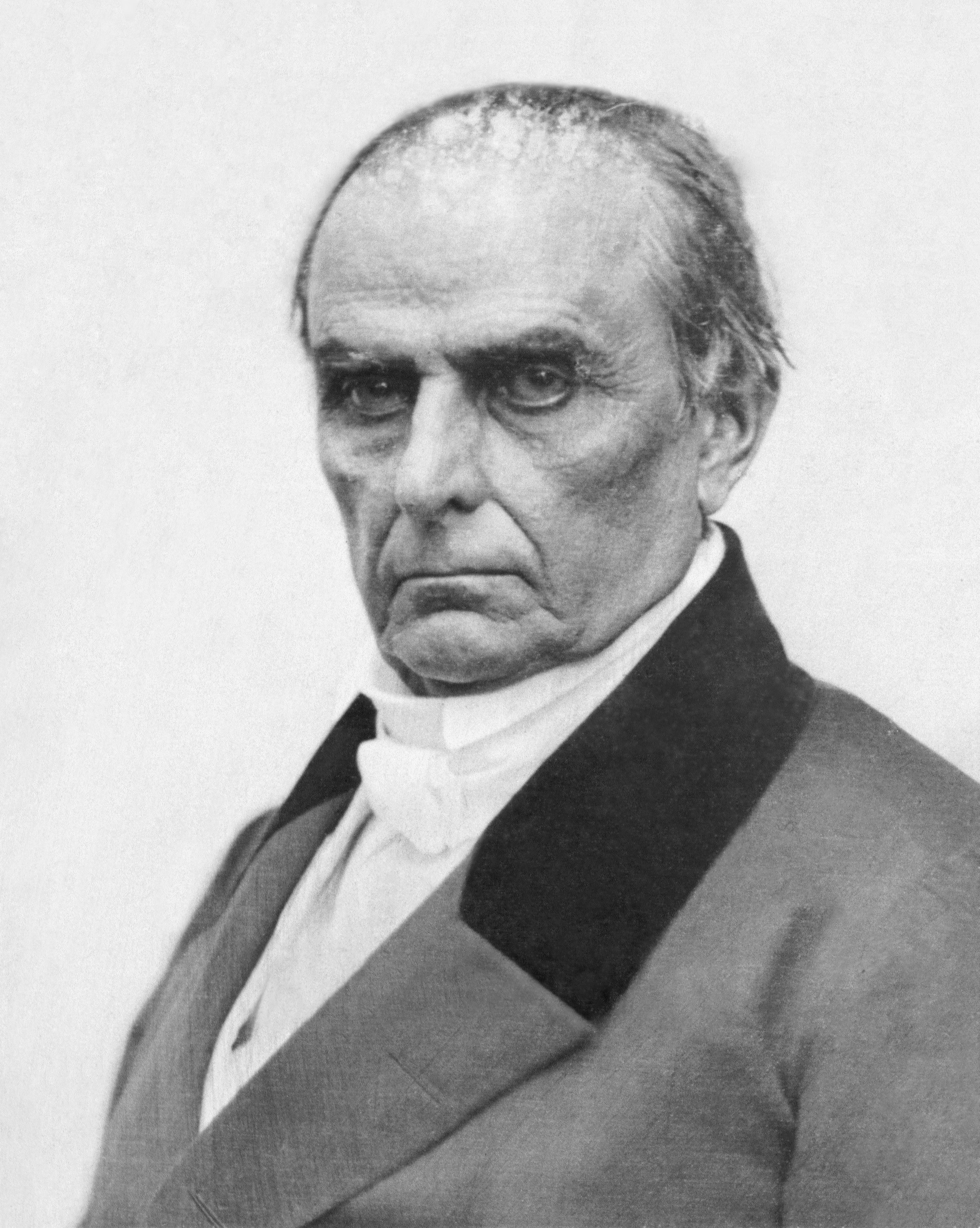
Secretary of State
Daniel Webster
from Massachusetts

Former Attorney General of Georgia
Charles J. Jenkins
from Georgia

A movement among disaffected Whigs to nominate Daniel Webster began in earnest following the Whig National Convention. As Webster made his way from Washington to his farm in Franklin, New Hampshire, many Whigs expressed their continued loyalty to him; some spoke of forming a new "Union" party with Webster as its presidential candidate. Webster received letters pressuring him to endorse the new party movement, hoping he'd allow his name to be used by an opposition convention. In Boston, the Webster movement was led by those who had opposed Scott's nomination, most notably George Ticknor Curtis, who had served controversially as a federal fugitive slave commissioner. These men had grown tired of military chieftains at the top of the Whig ticket and argued that the party had fallen under the control of dangerous foes of the Compromise. They lacked political experience and had little to lose.

When Webster reached Boston, the city held a huge celebration in his honor, which was "by far the most impressive and touching demonstration ever made by that people toward Mr. Webster." This outpouring of devotion, while helping to ease the sting of his defeat, alarmed some pro-Scott Whigs who feared it would lead to Webster's nomination by a "National Union Convention."

Those who had stuck with Webster throughout the nomination season knew that an independent bid was hopeless. They feared that his candidacy would damage the Whig Party and tarnish his legacy as the great "Defender of the Constitution." Although opposed to his nomination, Webster met Curtis in Marshfield and told him that he could not prevent anyone from voting for him. Privately, he was convinced that the Whig Party was disintegrating and that endorsing its ticket would be both futile and demeaning. In fact, he held a favorable view of Pierce and advised his assistant, Charles Lanman, along with Peter Harvey, to vote for him. Webster would never publicly comment on the nomination movement, which at this point had spread to New York and would shortly receive the endorsement of one faction of the Georgia Constitutional Union Party.

In North Carolina, a group of pro-Webster Whigs nominated electors pledged to Webster and Graham, the Whig nominee for vice president, prompting Graham to disavow the Webster movement.

In Massachusetts, encouraged by the actions of the Georgia Union Whigs, Curtis and his followers held a convention at Faneuil Hall in Boston on September 15 and endorsed the nominations made by the Georgia Unionist convention. However, in early September, Webster's health seriously declined. During his final days, his friends attempted to persuade him to denounce the independent movement. They abandoned their efforts after Abbot, who had initially favored a formal statement of party loyalty, concluded that it was unfair for them to pressure a dying man who had lost all interest in politics. Considering it useless to trouble him further, Curtis, on October 21, ordered the Webster Executive Committee in Boston to suspend activities. Webster died nine days before the election of a cerebral hemorrhage on October 24, 1852.

=== Constitutional Union Party nomination ===
The Constitutional Union Party was a political party organized in several slave states to support the Compromise of 1850. It was one of two major parties in the state of Georgia in the early 1850s, alongside the Southern Rights Party. The party formed as a merger of the local Democratic and Whig unionists. While former Whigs in the party were given important positions, such as senate seats, the party's executive committee was made up of mostly Democrats. Following the acquiescence of the Southern Rights leaders to the Compromise after 1851, the need for a dedicated Union party diminished. With a supermajority in the state legislature, the Union Party began its program of division of the political spoils, which eventually led to a split between the Democratic and Whig factions.

Party leaders adopted a wait-and-see attitude as the presidential election approached. In April, Union Democrats held a state convention that nominated delegates to attend the Democratic National Convention. Union Whigs held their own convention later that summer and appointed a delegation led by William C. Dawson to attend the Whig National Convention, instructing them to support the nomination of Millard Fillmore. These separate conventions laid the groundwork for the party's eventual collapse, providing Union Democrats with an excuse to return to the Democratic fold.

Although the Union Democrats supported Pierce as the national Democratic nominee, they refused to support the state Pierce ticket nominated by the Southern Rights Party. Instead, they ran their own ticket with the tacit consent of Governor Howell Cobb. At the subsequent Constitutional Union state convention on July 15, the Union Democrats were able to nominate an electoral ticket pledged to Pierce, causing Union Whigs to walk out of the convention. Fearing that Scott would repudiate the Compromise, they nominated Webster in a convention at Macon with Charles J. Jenkins as the candidate for vice president. Pro-Scott Whigs held a concurrent convention in Macon, but a fusion of the two groups failed to occur. Following these conventions, the Democratic majority on the Constitutional Union Party's executive committee declared the party dissolved and withdrew the independent Pierce ticket.

==== Union Democratic nomination ====
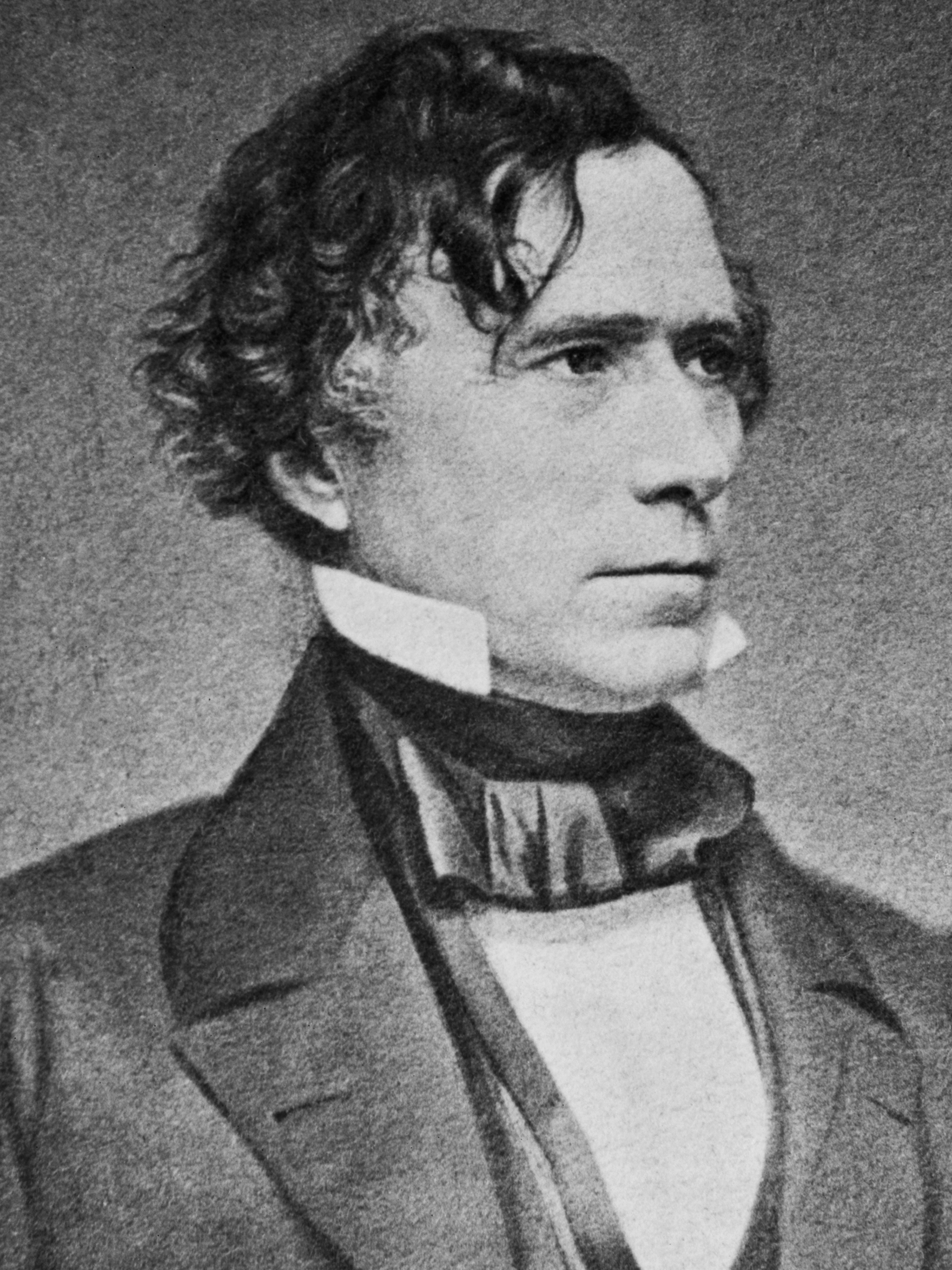
Former senator Franklin Pierce
from New Hampshire

==== Union Whig nomination ====
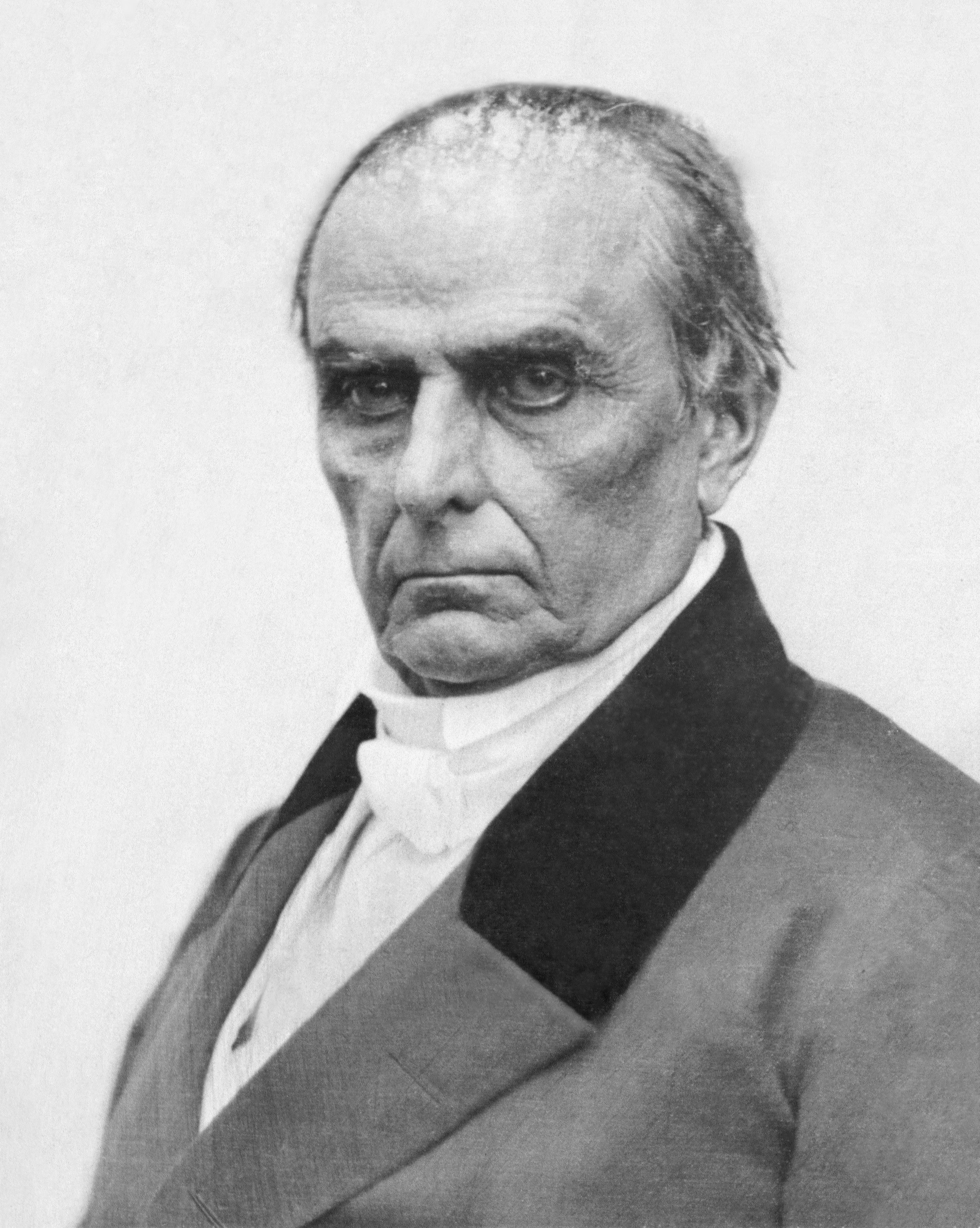
Secretary of State
Daniel Webster
from Massachusetts

Former Attorney General of Georgia
Charles J. Jenkins
from Georgia

=== Native American Party nomination ===
Around the mid-1830s, nativists were present in New York politics, under the aegis of the American Republican Party. The American Republican party was formed in 1843 in major opposition to Catholicism and Catholic immigrants. In 1845, the party changed its name to the Native American Party. Their opponents nicknamed them the "Know Nothings". The party liked the name, and it became the official nickname of the party until it collapsed in 1860. In 1852, the original presidential nominee planned by the Native American Party was Daniel Webster, the presidential nominee of the Union Party. They nominated Webster without his permission, with George C. Washington (grandnephew of George Washington) as his vice presidential running mate. Webster died of natural causes nine days before the election, and the Know-Nothings quickly replaced Webster by nominating Jacob Broom for president and replaced Washington with Reynell Coates for vice president.

=== Southern Rights Party nomination ===
The Southern Rights Party was a political party organized in several slave states to oppose the Compromise of 1850, viewing it as inadequate protection for the South, and advocate for secession from the Union, though it later abandoned serious plans for secession. It was one of two major parties in the states of Alabama, Georgia, and Mississippi in the early 1850s, alongside the Union Party. The party was made up of mostly Democrats and State Rights Whigs. By 1851, most Southern Rights Democrats had acquiesced to the compromise, believing further opposition to it was hopeless.

It was unclear in early 1852 if the remnants of the party would contest the presidential election. When the Southern Rights Convention of Alabama in Montgomery was held in early March, only six counties were represented. The convention voted to keep the party alive throughout the southern states to oppose both the Democrats and Whigs, or cooperate with either based on the extent to which their doctrines aligned with the principles of the Southern Rights men. In most states, the party was too disorganized to nominate its own candidate and have an effect on the election. The South Carolinian Southern Standard argued that the Southern Rights parties should coordinate and attempt to influence the Democratic nomination, though not by joining the Democratic convention, as that might obligate them to support an unfavorable candidate. Instead, the paper proposed holding a parallel convention at the same time and place, so they could be "prepared to act as circumstances might require".

==== Southern Rights Party of Alabama nomination ====
- George Troup, former U.S. senator from Georgia
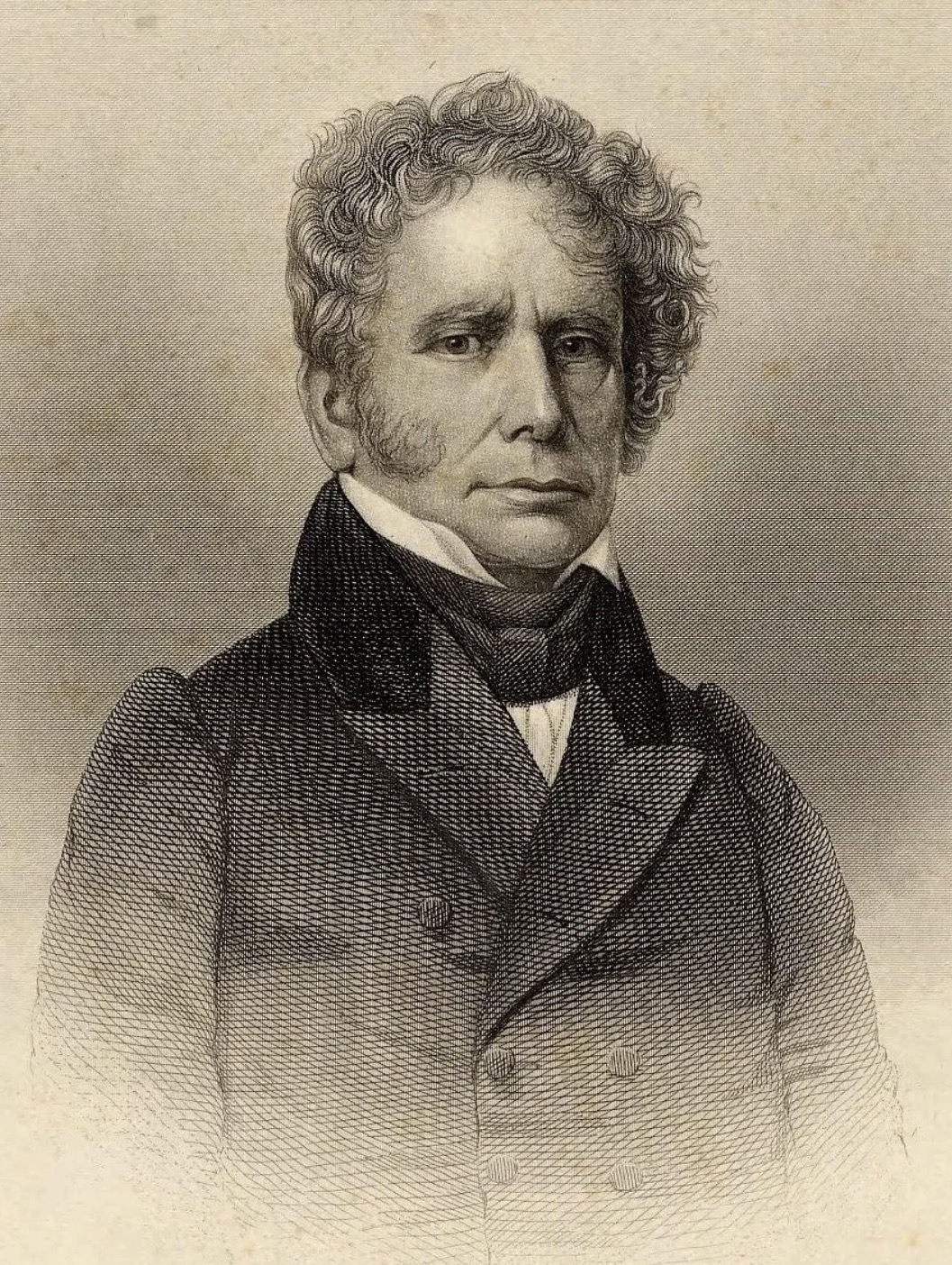
Former senator George Troup
from Georgia

After the Democratic National Convention, the party was not sure that it wanted to support Franklin Pierce and William R. King, the Democratic nominees. Another Southern Rights Convention was held in Montgomery from July 13–15 and debated at length whether to keep up a separate organization and whether they wanted to nominate Pierce.

The convention was unable to arrive at a decision, deciding to appoint a committee to review the positions of Scott/Graham and Pierce/King, with the option of calling a "national" convention if the two major-party tickets appeared deficient. The committee took its time reviewing the positions of Pierce and Scott, finally deciding on August 25 to call a convention for a Southern Rights Party ticket. Pierce had failed to answer their inquiry and on August 27 it was reported that Scort replied to the letter of the Alabama Southern Rights Central Committee, but declined giving specitic answers to their interrogatories.

The convention assembled in Montgomery, Alabama, with 62 delegates present, a committee to recommend a ticket being appointed while the delegates listened to speeches in the interim. The committee eventually recommended former senator George Troup of Georgia for president, and former governor John Quitman of Mississippi for vice president; they were unanimously nominated.

The two nominees accepted their nominations soon after the convention, which was held rather late in the season. Troup stated in a letter, dated September 27 and printed in the New York Times on October 16, that he had planned to vote for Pierce/King and had always wholeheartedly supported William R.D. King. He indicated in the letter that he preferred to decline the honor, as he was rather ill at the time and feared that he would die before the election. The state party's executive committee edited the letter to excise those portions which indicated that Troup preferred to decline, a fact which was revealed after the election.

==== Southern Rights Party of Georgia nomination ====
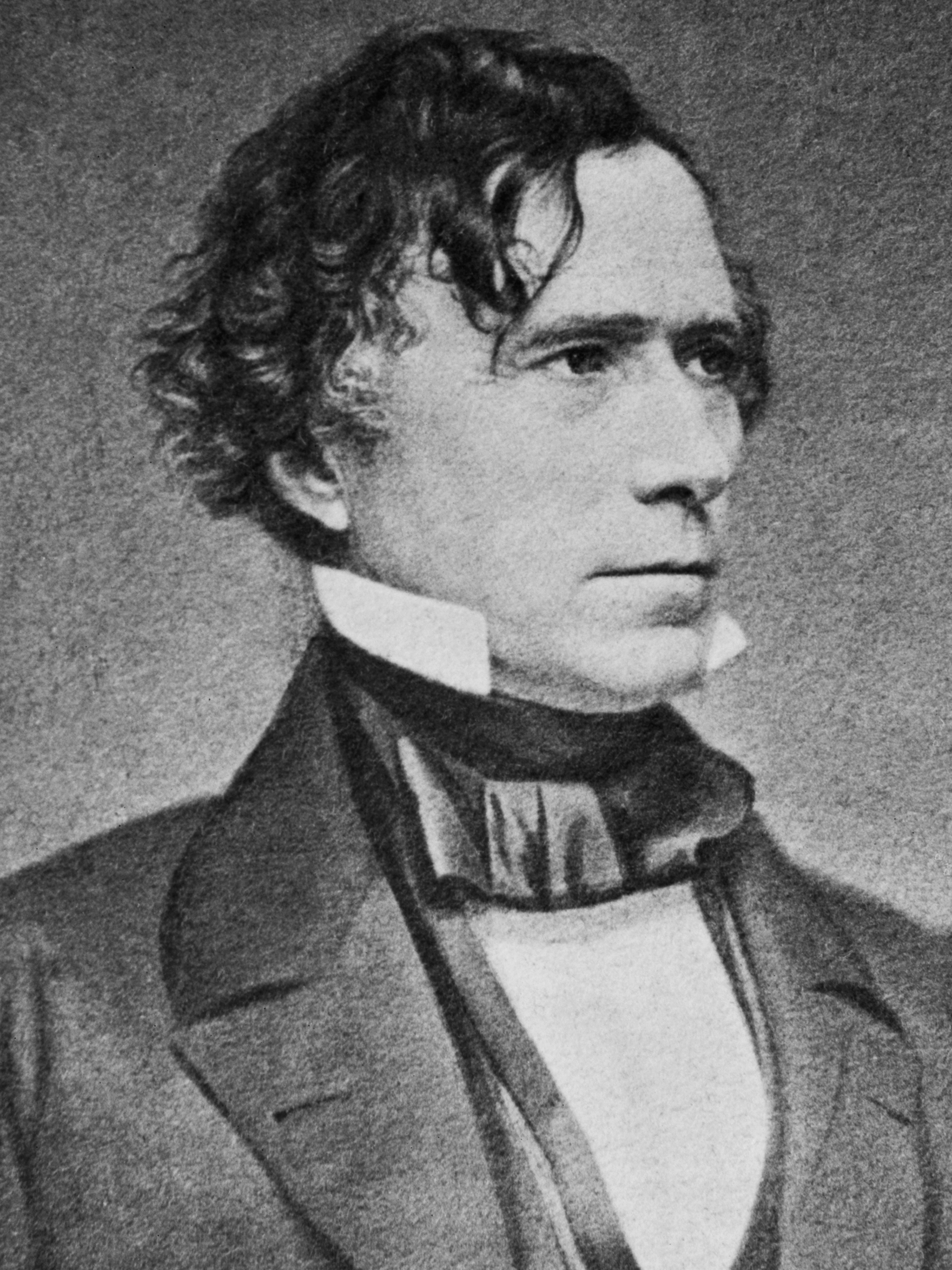
Former senator
Franklin Pierce
from New Hampshire

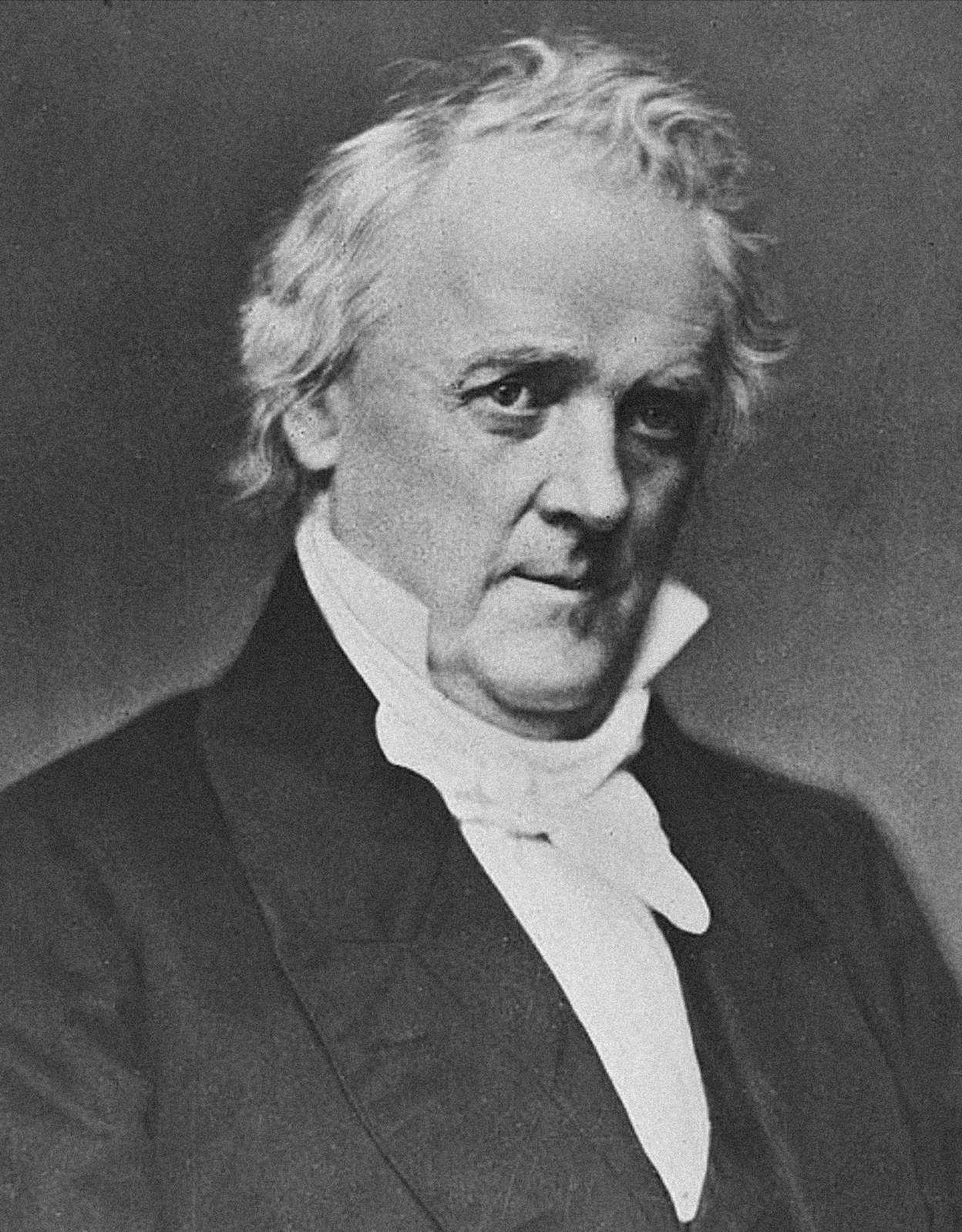
Former Secretary
of State
James Buchanan

Seeking to gain favor of the successful national party, whom would most likely be the Democrats, the Resistance Party, as the Georgian branch was known, changed its name to the Southern Rights Party and held a convention on March 31, 1852. At this convention, it nominated delegates to the national Democratic convention and an electoral ticket headed by Herschel V. Johnson and Wilson Lumpkin. These men were instructed to show no preference for any particular candidate, although a large majority of the convention that nominated them supported Buchanan as their first choice.

In April, the Democrats in the Constitutional Union Party had held a convention where they nominated delegates to the national Democratic convention. Both groups were seated. Following the dissolution of the Constitutional Union Party, Georgia Democrats and the Southern Rights Party met in a joint convention and attempted to consolidate support for Pierce in a combined Southern Rights-Democratic ticket.

=== Liberty Party nomination ===
The Liberty Party had ceased to become a significant political force after most of its members joined the Free Soil Party in 1848. Nonetheless, some of those who rejected the fusion strategy held a Liberty Party National Convention in Buffalo, New York. There were few delegates present, so a ticket was recommended and a later convention called. The Convention recommended Gerrit Smith of New York for president and Charles Durkee of Wisconsin for vice president. A second convention was held in Syracuse, New York, in early September 1852, but it too failed to draw enough delegates to select nominees. Yet a third convention gathered in Syracuse later that month and nominated William Goodell of New York for president and S.M. Bell of Virginia for vice president. A slate of electors nominated by the Liberty Party received 72 votes in New York.

== General election ==
=== Fall campaign ===
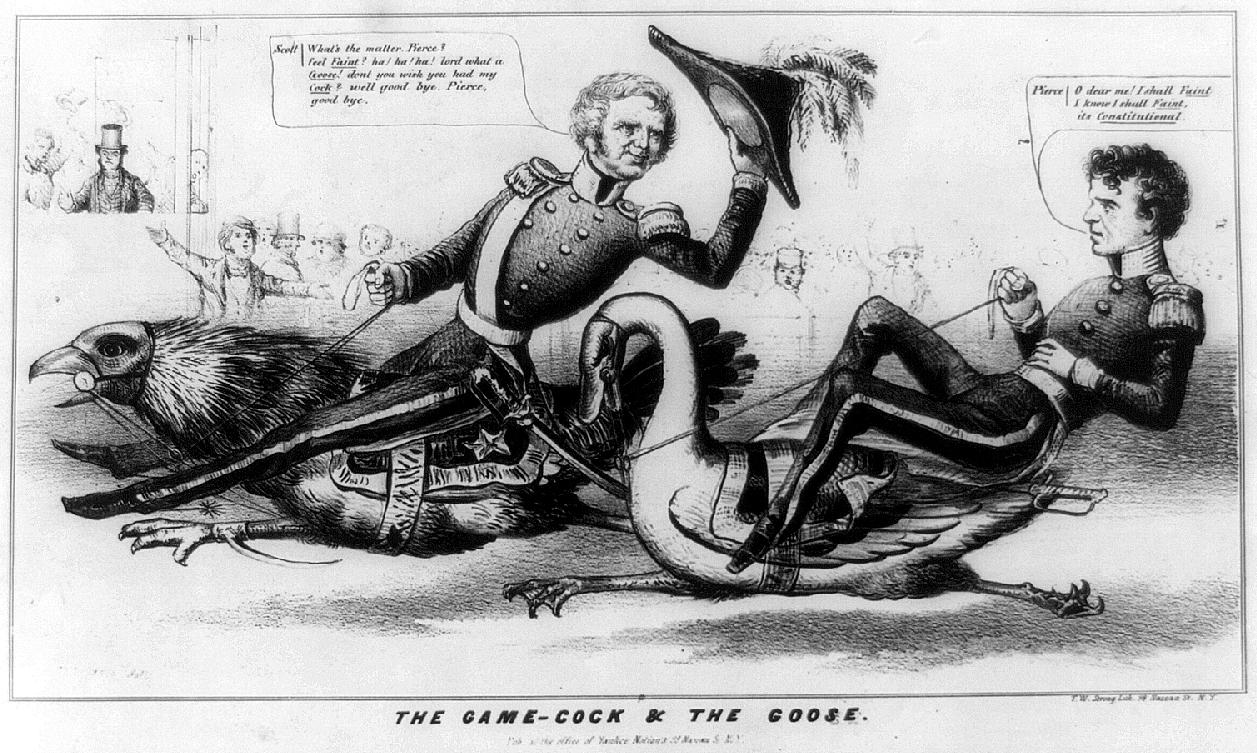
Political cartoon favoring Winfield Scott

The Whigs' platform was almost indistinguishable from that of the Democrats, reducing the campaign to a contest between the personalities of the two candidates. The lack of clearcut issues between the two parties helped drive voter turnout down to its lowest level since 1836. The decline was further exacerbated by Scott's antislavery reputation, which decimated the Southern Whig vote at the same time as the pro-slavery Whig platform undermined the Northern Whig vote. After the Compromise of 1850 was passed, many of the southern Whig Party members broke with the party's key figure, Henry Clay.

Finally, Scott's status as a war hero was somewhat offset by the fact that Pierce was himself a Mexican–American War brigadier general.

The Democrats adopted the slogan: The Whigs we Polked in forty-four, We'll Pierce in fifty-two, playing on the names of Pierce and former president James K. Polk.

Just nine days before the election, Webster died, causing many Union state parties to remove their slates of electors. The Union ticket appeared on the ballot in Georgia and Massachusetts, however.

=== Results ===
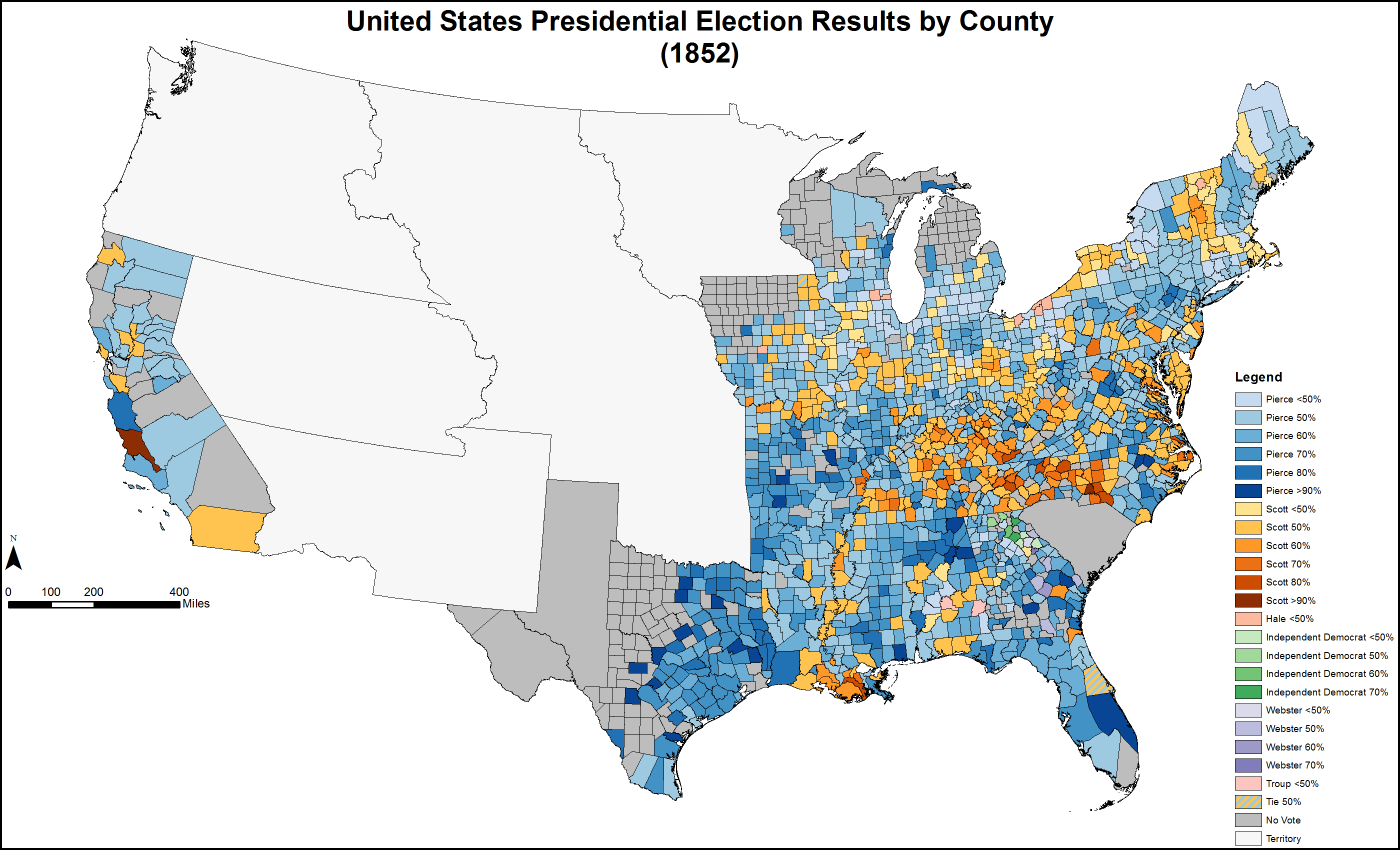
Results by county explicitly indicating the percentage of the winning candidate in each county. Shades of blue are for Pierce (Democratic), shades of yellow are for Scott (Whig), shades of red are for Hale (Free Soil), shades of orange are for Webster (Union), shades of green are for (Independent Democrats), and shades of purple are for Troup (Southern Rights).

The birth place of Genl. Frank Pierce, Hillsboro New Hampshire

27.3% of the voting age population and 69.5% of eligible voters participated in the election. When American voters went to the polls, Pierce won the electoral college in a landslide; Scott won only the states of Kentucky, Tennessee, Massachusetts, and Vermont, while the Free Soil vote collapsed to less than half of what Martin Van Buren had earned in the previous election, with the party taking no states. The fact that Daniel Webster received a substantial share of the vote in Georgia and Massachusetts, even though he was dead, shows how disenchanted voters were with the two main candidates.

As a result of the devastating defeat and the growing tensions within the party between pro-slavery Southerners and anti-slavery Northerners, the Whig Party quickly fell apart after the 1852 election and ceased to exist. Some Southern Whigs would join the Democratic Party, and many Northern Whigs would help to form the new Republican Party in 1854.

Some Whigs in both sections would support the so-called "Know-Nothing" party in the 1856 presidential election. Similarly, the Free Soil Party rapidly fell away into obscurity after the election, and the remaining members mostly opted to join the former Northern Whigs in forming the Republican Party.

The Southern Rights Party effectively collapsed following the election, attaining only five percent of the vote in Alabama, and a few hundred in its nominee's home state of Georgia. It would elect a number of Congressmen in 1853, but they would rejoin the Democratic Party upon taking their seats in Congress.

Kentucky and Tennessee were the only slave states that Scott won. None of the future Confederate states elected governors in the 1852 and 1853 gubernatorial elections, and the Whigs only won 14 of the South's 65 seats in the U.S. House. The party held no state legislatures in the South except in Tennessee. The Democrats, who carried all but two northern states, would see a decline in the north following the 1854 elections due to controversy around the Kansas–Nebraska Act. They lost control of all free state legislatures except for two, and their seats in the U.S. House from the north fell from 93 to 23.

The four elections from 1840 to 1852 saw the incumbent party defeated each time; the only other such streak was from 1884 to 1896. This was the last election in which the Democrats won Michigan until 1932, (Note: In 1892 Democrat Grover Cleveland did win one electoral vote from each of five Michigan congressional districts he carried despite losing the state) the last in which the Democrats won Iowa, Maine, New Hampshire, Ohio (Note: In 1892 the direct election of presidential electors meant Grover Cleveland received one Ohio electoral vote) or Rhode Island until 1912, the last in which the Democrats won Wisconsin until 1892, the last in which the Democrats won Connecticut until 1876 and the last in which the Democrats won New York until 1868. It was, however, the last election in which the Democrats' chief opponent won Kentucky until 1896, (Note: Constitutional Union Party candidate John Bell won Kentucky in 1860; however, Bell was surpassed in the popular vote by two Democratic factions and Republican Abraham Lincoln. Apart from this, the Democrats won Kentucky in all ten elections between 1856 and 1892.) and the last until 1928 in which the Democrats' opponent obtained an absolute majority in Kentucky.

Electoral results
| Presidential candidate | Party | Home state | Popular vote (Note: The popular vote figures exclude South Carolina where the Electors were chosen by the state legislature rather than by popular vote.) | | Electoral vote | Running mate | | |
| Presidential candidate | Party | Home state | Count | Percentage | Electoral vote | Vice-presidential candidate | Home state | Electoral vote |
|---|---|---|---|---|---|---|---|---|
| Franklin Pierce | Democratic (Note: Pierce was also nominated by the Georgia Southern Rights Party.) | New Hampshire | 1,598,363 | 50.63% | 254 | William R. King | Alabama | 254 |
| Winfield Scott | Whig | New Jersey | 1,385,255 | 43.88% | 42 | William Alexander Graham | North Carolina | 42 |
| John P. Hale | Free Soil | New Hampshire | 155,441 | 4.92% | 0 | George Washington Julian | Indiana | 0 |
| Daniel Webster (Note: Webster died on October 24, 1852, one week before the election. Despite this, tickets bearing his name were cast in Massachusetts and Georgia, and he still managed to poll nearly seven thousand votes. He was also the original candidate of the Native American Party but was replaced on his death by Jacob Broom.) | Union Whig | Massachusetts | 7,378 | 0.23% | 0 | Charles J. Jenkins | Georgia | 0 |
| Franklin Pierce | Union Democratic | New Hampshire | 5,804 | 0.18% | 0 | William R. King | Alabama | 0 |
| Jacob Broom | Native American | Pennsylvania | 2,415 | 0.08% | 0 | Reynell Coates | New Jersey | 0 |
| George Troup | Southern Rights | Georgia | 2,205 | 0.07% | 0 | John A. Quitman | Mississippi | 0 |
| William Goodell (Note: The votes for the Liberty ticket in New York were caste for Goodell, although Dubin erroneously counts them for Gerrit Smith, who was not a candidate.) | Liberty Party | New York | 72 | 0.002% | 0 | S.M. Bell | Wisconsin | 0 |
| Total | | | 3,156,800 | 100% | 296 | | | 296 |
| Needed to win | | | | | 149 | | | 149 |

Source (Popular Vote): Dubin, Michael J. United States Presidential Elections, 1788–1860 pp 115-134 Source (Electoral Vote): "Electoral College Box Scores 1789–1996". National Archives and Records Administration.

- The leading candidates for vice president were both born in North Carolina and in fact both attended the University of North Carolina at Chapel Hill, albeit two decades apart. While there, they were members of opposing debate societies: the Dialectic and Philanthropic Societies. Both also served in North Carolina politics: King was a representative from North Carolina before he moved to Alabama, and Graham was a governor of North Carolina.

Popular vote
| Pierce | 50.82% |
| Scott | 43.88% |
| Hale | 4.92% |
| Others | 0.56% |

Electoral vote
| Pierce | 85.81% |
| Scott | 14.19% |

=== Geography of results ===
==== Cartographic gallery ====
Map of presidential election results by county

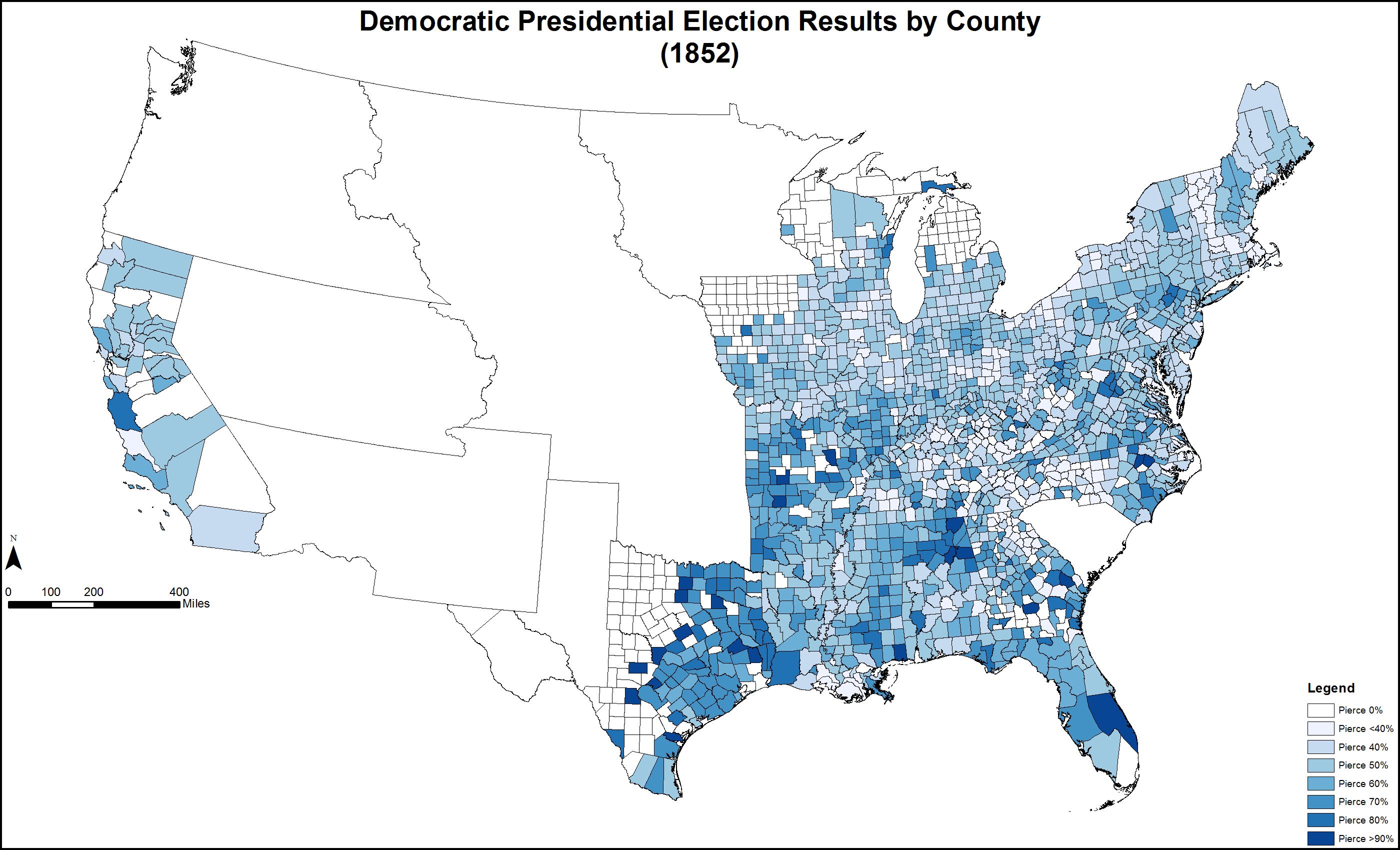
Map of Democratic presidential election results by county

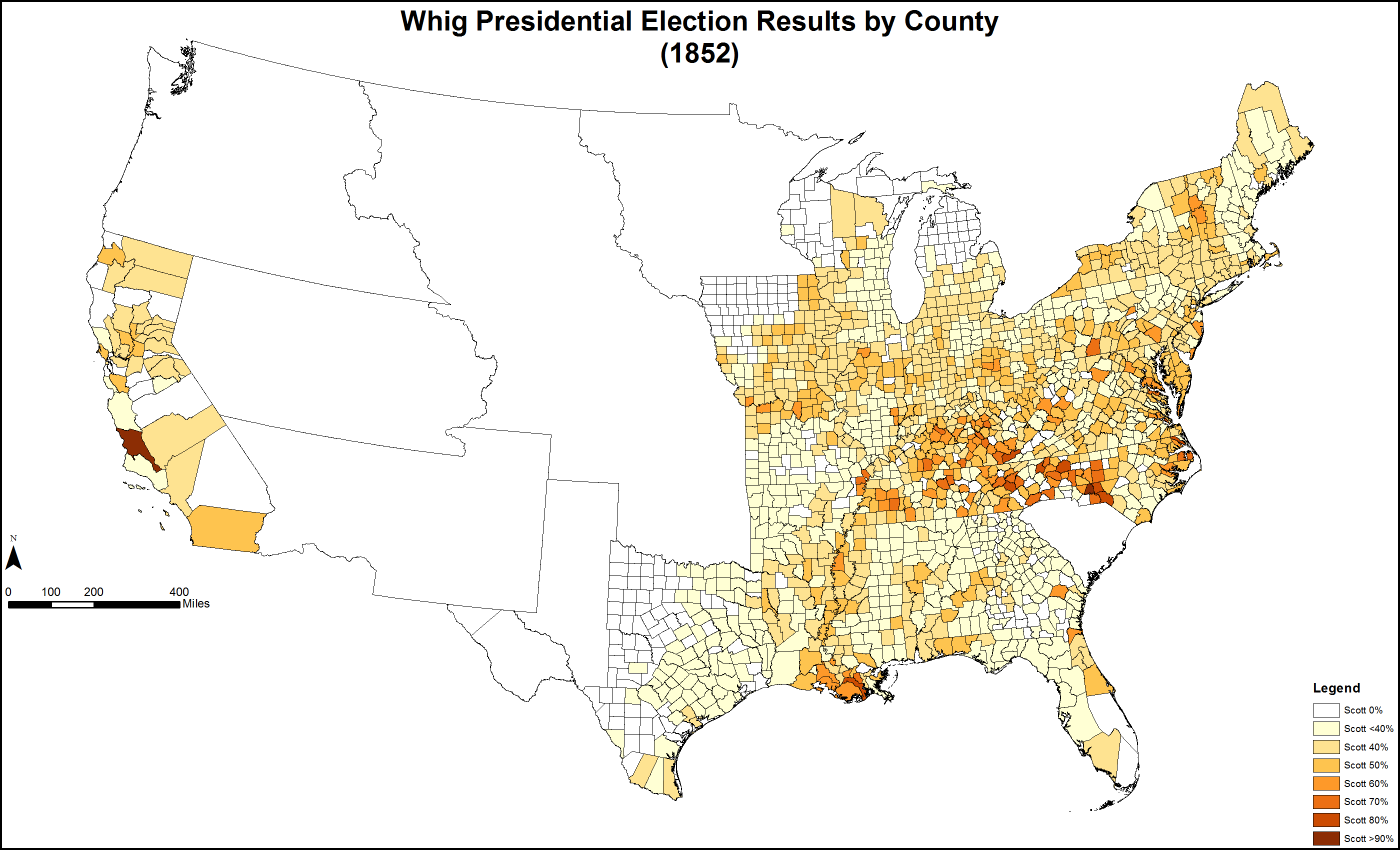
Map of Whig presidential election results by county

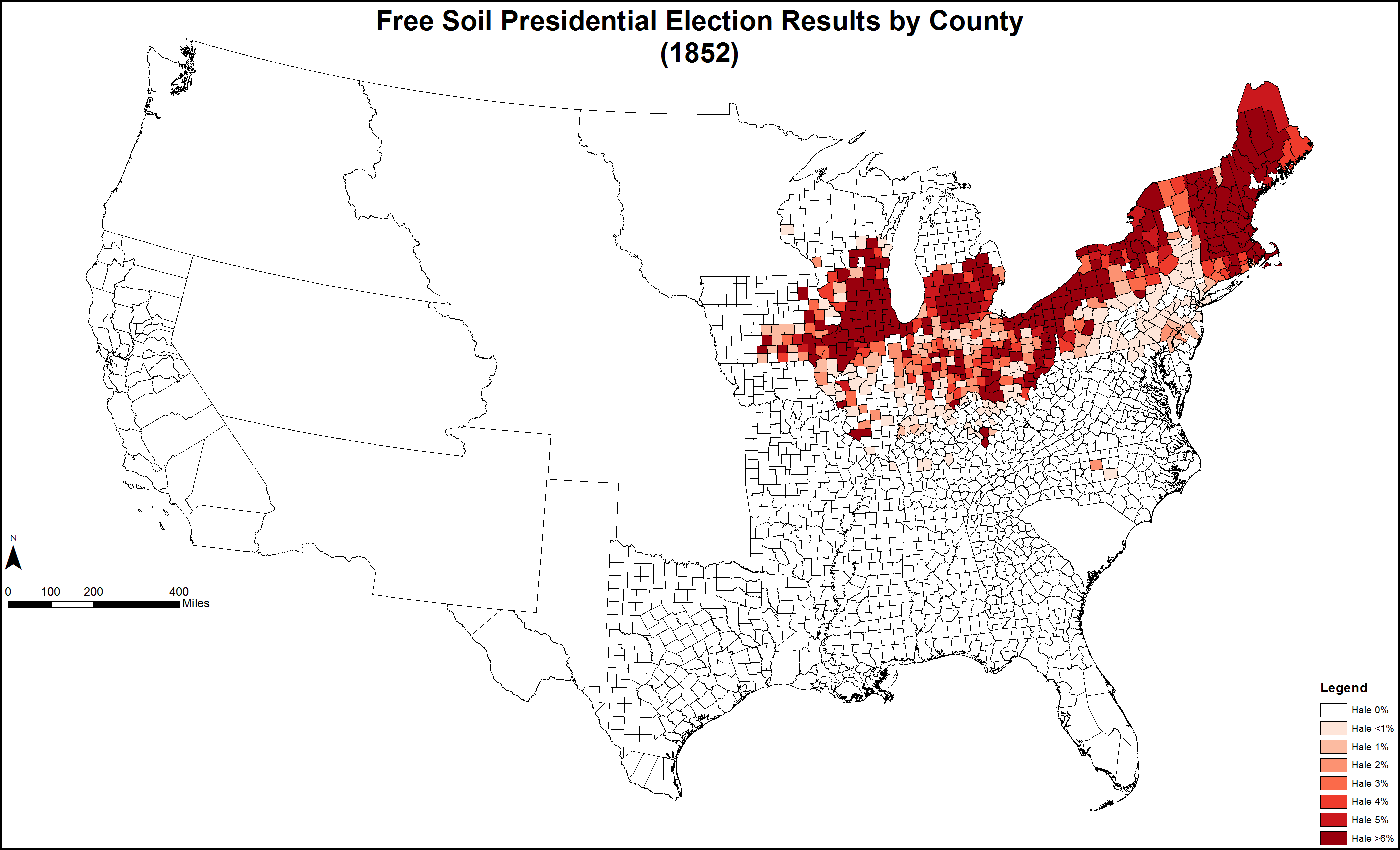
Map of Free Soil presidential election results by county

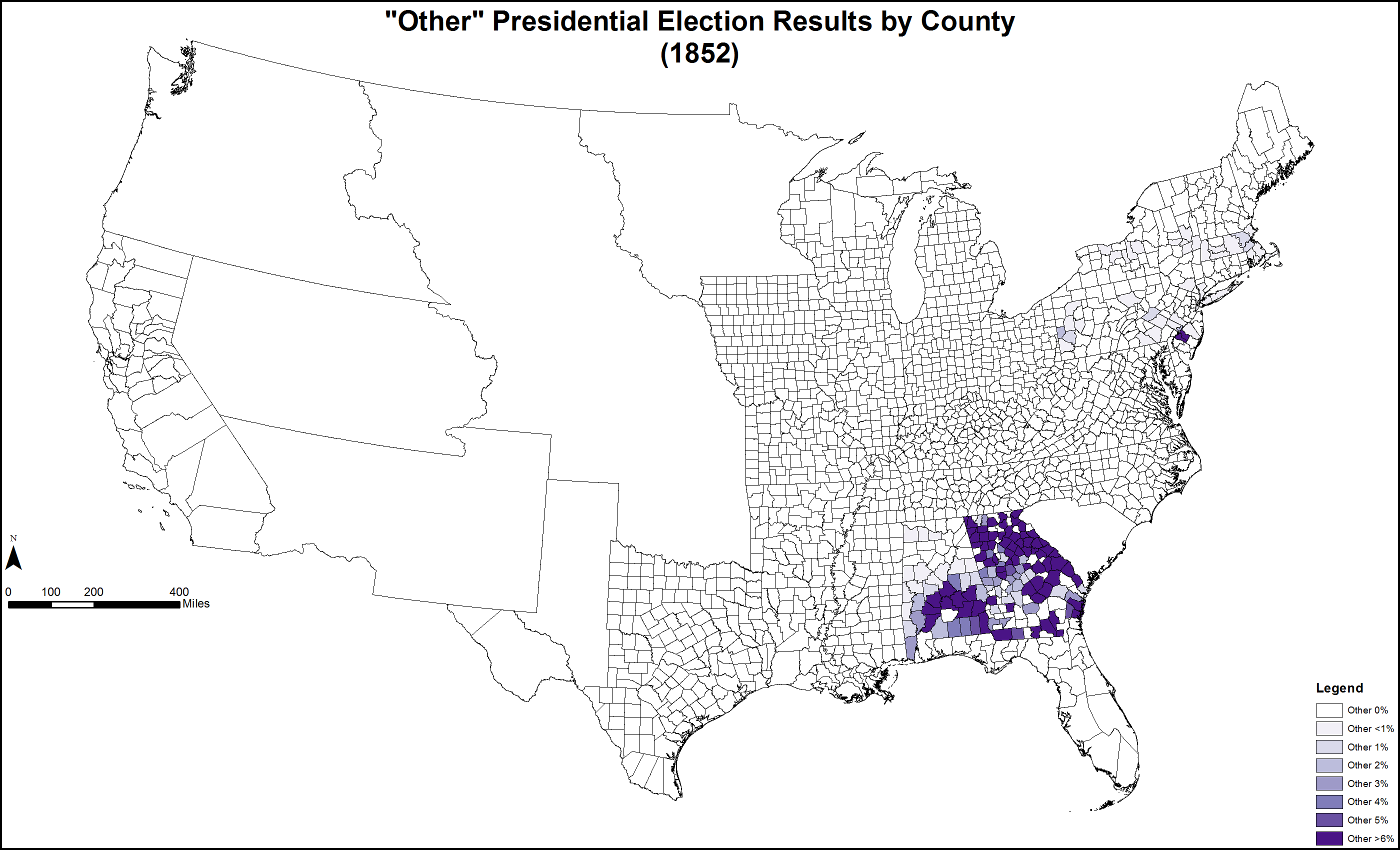
Map of "Other" presidential election results by county

== Results by state ==
Source: Data from Dubin, Michael J. United States Presidential Elections, 1788–1860 pp 115-134 with differences with Walter Dean Burnham, Presidential ballots, 1836–1892 (Johns Hopkins University Press, 1955) pp 247–57 noted.

States/districts won by Pierce/King
States/districts won by Scott/Graham

| | | Franklin Pierce Democratic | | | Winfield Scott Whig | | | John P. Hale Free Soil | | | Others | | | Margin | | State Total | |
| State | electoral votes | # | % | electoral votes | # | % | electoral votes | # | % | electoral votes | # | % | electoral votes | # | % | # | |
|---|---|---|---|---|---|---|---|---|---|---|---|---|---|---|---|---|---|
| Alabama | 9 | 26,881 | 60.89 | 9 | 15,061 | 34.12 | - | no ballots | | | 2,205 (Note: Troup) | 4.99 | - | 11,820 | 26.77 | 44,147 | AL |
| Arkansas | 4 | 12,179 | 62.11 | 4 | 7,430 | 24.22 | - | no ballots | | | no ballots | | | 4,749 | 24.36 | 19,609 | AR |
| California (Note: Dubin does not mention FS or other votes. These votes are from Burnham. Both cite the manuscript returns) | 4 | 40,585 (Note: Added county returns in the Manuscript returns. Stated total was 40,885) | 53.12 | 4 | 35,752 (Note: Stated total was 36,052) | 46.79 | - | 62 | 0.09 | - | 56 (Note: Scattering) | | - | 4,833 | 6.33 | 76,337 | CA |
| Connecticut (Note: Burnham gives FS 3,160. Both cite the manuscript returns) | 6 | 33,249 | 49.79 | 6 | 30,359 | 45.56 | - | 3,161 | 4.73 | - | no ballots | | | 2,890 | 4.23 | 66,769 | CT |
| Delaware (Note: Burnham gives 6,318, 6,293, and 62. Both cite the manuscript returns) | 3 | 6,330 | 49.87 | 3 | 6,299 | 49.63 | - | 63 | 0.50 | - | no ballots | | | 31 | 0.24 | 12,692 | DE |
| Florida | 3 | 4,318 | 60.03 | 3 | 2,875 | 39.97 | - | no ballots | | | no ballots | | | 1,443 | 20.06 | 7,193 | FL |
| Georgia (Note: Burnham gives 34,565, 16,636, 5,808, 5,324. Burnham cites "Executive Minutes of Georgia", while Dubin cites Burnham and several newspapers.) | 10 | 34,708 | 55.56 | 10 | 16,639 | 26.63 | - | no ballots | | | 11,125 (Note: Independent Democratic Anti-SRP Pierce ticket: 5,804, Webster: 5,321) | 17.81 | - | 18,069 | 28.93 | 62,472 | GA |
| Illinois (Note: Burnham gives 80,378 for Dems. Burnham cites manuscript returns, while Dubin cites Illinois Election Returns 1818–1990) | 11 | 80,368 | 51.86 | 11 | 64,733 | 41.77 | - | 9,863 | 6.36 | - | no ballots | | | 15,635 | 10.09 | 154,964 | IL |
| Indiana (Note: Burnham gives 95,313, 80,920, 6,928, 414 Scattering. Burnham cites manuscript returns, while Dubin cites the Indiana Daily Sentinel) | 13 | 94,890 (Note: Stated total was 95,311) | 51.93 | 13 | 80,901 (Note: Stated total was 80,914) | 44.28 | - | 6,928 (Note: Stated total was 6,906) | 3.79 | - | no ballots | | | 13,989 | 7.65 | 182,719 | IN |
| Iowa (Note: Burnham gives 17,753, 15,666, 1,604. Burnham cites manuscript returns, Dubin cites the Iowa Republican) | 4 | 17,824 (Note: Stated total was 17,823) | 50.02 | 4 | 16,195 (Note: Stated total was 15,895) | 45.45 | - | 1,612 | 4.52 | - | no ballots | | | 1,629 | 4.57 | 35,631 | IA |
| Kentucky (Note: Burnham gives 53,766 D and 57,064 W. Burnham cites the Whig Almanec, Dubin cites (Frankfort) Commonwealth, December 7, 1852; Presidential Politics in Kentucky) (Note: The returns from Whitely County were not included in the official returns. They gave 503 D 360 W) | 12 | 53,807 | 48.40 | - | 57,108 | 51.37 | 12 | 256 | 0.23 | - | no ballots | | | -3,301 | -2.97 | 111,171 | KY |
| Louisiana | 6 | 18,653 (Note: Stated total was 18,647) | 51.95 | 6 | 17,255 | 48.05 | - | no ballots | | | no ballots | | | 1,398 | 3.90 | 35,908 | LA |
| Maine | 8 | 41,609 | 50.63 | 8 | 32,543 | 39.60 | - | 8,030 | 9.77 | - | no ballots | | | 9,066 | 11.03 | 82,182 | ME |
| Maryland (Note: Burnham gives 40,020 D 35,077 W. Both cite the manuscript returns) | 8 | 40,428 | 53.50 | 8 | 35,080 | 46.42 | - | 56 | 0.07 | - | no ballots | | | 5,348 | 7.08 | 75,564 | MD |
| Massachusetts (Note: Burnham gives 44,569, 52,683, 28,023, and does not mention Webster. Burnham cites the Whig Almanac, Dubin cites the manuscript returns) | 13 | 45,875 | 35.72 | - | 52,863 | 41.16 | 13 | 28,023 | 21.82 | - | 1,670 (Note: Webster) | 1.30 | - | -6,988 | -5.44 | 128,431 | MA |
| Michigan (Note: Burnham gives 33,858 W 7,280 FS. Burnham cites the Michigan Manual, 1917, Dubin cites the Michigan Manual, 1913) | 6 | 41,842 | 50.45 | 6 | 33,860 (Note: Stated total was 33,800) | 40.83 | - | 7,237 | 8.73 | - | no ballots | | | 7,982 | 9.62 | 82,939 | MI |
| Mississippi (Note: Burnham gives 26,968 17,555. Both cite the manuscript returns) (Note: The returns of De Soto County were labelled "not official" and not included in the manuscript returns) | 7 | 26,110 | 60.89 | 7 | 16,773 | 39.11 | - | no ballots | | | no ballots | | | 9,337 | 21.78 | 42,883 | MS |
| Missouri (Note: Burnham gives 38,985 30,319. Burnham cites the Whig almanac, Dubin cites the manuscript returns) | 9 | 38,610 | 56.32 | 9 | 29,947 | 43.68 | - | no ballots | | | no ballots | | | 8,663 | 12.64 | 68,557 | MO |
| New Hampshire (Note: Burnham gives 15,496 W. Both cite the New Hampshire Manual, 1889) | 5 | 28,503 | 56.40 | 5 | 15,486 | 30.64 | - | 6,546 | 12.95 | - | no ballots | | | 13,017 | 25.76 | 50,535 | NH |
| New Jersey | 7 | 44,301 | 52.79 | 7 | 38,551 | 45.93 | - | 336 (Note: Stated total was 344) | 0.40 | - | 738 (Note: Broome) (Note: Stated total was 714) | 0.88 | - | 5,750 | 6.86 | 83,926 | NJ |
| New York | 35 | 262,083 (Note: Stated total was 262,456) | 50.12 | 35 | 234,896 (Note: Stated total was 234,906) | 44.92 | - | 25,435 (Note: Stated total was 25,433) | 4.86 | - | 459 (Note: Webster 387, Smith 72) | 0.08 | - | 27,187 | 5.20 | 522,873 | NY |
| North Carolina (Note: Burnham gives 39,028 W and does not mention Hale. Burnham cites the Whig almanac, Dubin cites the manuscript returns) | 10 | 39,784 (Note: Stated total was 39,744) | 50.39 | 10 | 39,108 | 49.53 | - | 59 | 0.07 | - | no ballots | | | 676 | 0.86 | 78,951 | NC |
| Ohio | 23 | 169,190 (Note: Stated total was 168,933) | 47.94 | 23 | 152,577 (Note: Stated total was 152,523) | 43.24 | - | 31,133 (Note: Stated total was 31,732) | 8.82 | - | no ballots | | | 16,613 | 4.70 | 352,900 | OH |
| Pennsylvania (Note: Burnham gives 198,578, 179,175, 8,508, and does not mention Broome. Burham cites the Whig almanac, Dubin cites the Legislative Documents of the Commonwealth of Pennsylvania) | 27 | 198,591 (Note: Stated total was 198,590) | 51.17 | 27 | 179,216 (Note: Stated total was 179,128) | 46.18 | - | 8,596 (Note: Stated total was 8,496) | 2.22 | - | 1,677 (Note: Broome) | 0.43 | - | 19,375 | 4.99 | 388,080 | PA |
| Rhode Island | 4 | 8,735 | 51.37 | 4 | 7,626 | 44.85 | - | 644 | 3.79 | - | no ballots | | | 1,109 | 6.52 | 17,005 | RI |
| South Carolina | 8 | no popular vote | | 8 | no popular vote | | | no popular vote | | | no popular vote | | | - | - | - | SC |
| Tennessee (Note: Burnham gives 56,900 58,586. Burnham cites the Whig alamanac, Dubin cites the Nashville True Whig) | 12 | 57,056 (Note: Stated total was 57,123) | 49.27 | - | 58,807 | 50.73 | 12 | no ballots | | | no ballots | | | -1,751 | -1.46 | 115,863 | TN |
| Texas (Note: Burnham gives 14,857 5,356 Independent Whig 10 Southern Rights 2. Both cite the manuscript returns) (Note: According to Dubin, 17 Counties returns were received after the deadline and were not included in the official returns. These votes were 2,637 D 1,119 W) | 4 | 11,519 | 73.34 | 4 | 4,187 | 26.66 | - | no ballots | | | no ballots | | | 7,332 | 46.68 | 15,706 | TX |
| Vermont | 5 | 13,044 | 29.77 | - | 22,156 | 50.56 | 5 | 8,621 | 19.67 | - | no ballots | | | -9,112 | -20.79 | 43,821 | VT |
| Virginia | 15 | 73,833 (Note: Stated total was 73,872) | 55.70 | 15 | 58,732 | 44.30 | - | no ballots | | | no ballots | | | 15,101 | 11.40 | 132,565 | VA |
| Wisconsin (Note: Burnham gives 31,853 20,985 8,804. Burnham cites the Wilveukee Daily Sentinel, Dubin cites How Wisconsin Voted, 1848–1872) | 5 | 33,658 | 52.04 | 5 | 22,240 | 34.34 | - | 8,842 | 13.63 | - | no ballots | | | 11,418 | 17.70 | 64,682 | WI |
| TOTALS: | 296 | 1,598,363 | 50.82 | 254 | 1,385,255 | 43.88 | 42 | 155,441 | 4.92 | - | 17,741 | 0.56 | - | 213,108 | 6.94 | 3,156,800 | the US |
| TO WIN: | 149 | | | | | | | | | | | | | | | | |

=== States that flipped from Whig to Democratic ===
- Connecticut
- Delaware
- Georgia
- Florida
- Louisiana
- Maryland
- New Jersey
- New York
- North Carolina
- Pennsylvania
- Rhode Island

=== Close states ===
States where the margin of victory was under 1%:

1. Delaware 0.24% (31 votes)
2. North Carolina 0.86% (676 votes)

States where the margin of victory was under 5%:

1. Tennessee 1.46% (1,751 votes)
2. Kentucky 2.97% (3,301 votes)
3. Louisiana 3.90% (1,398 votes)
4. Connecticut 4.23% (2,890 votes)
5. Iowa 4.57% (1,629 votes)
6. Ohio 4.70% (16,613 votes)
7. Pennsylvania 4.99% (19,375 votes)

States where the margin of victory was under 10%:

1. New York 5.20% (27,187 votes) (tipping point state)
2. Massachusetts 5.44% (6,988 votes)
3. California 6.33% (4,833 votes)
4. Rhode Island 6.52% (1,109 votes)
5. New Jersey 6.86% (5,750 votes)
6. Maryland 7.08% (5,348 votes)
7. Indiana 7.65% (13,989 votes)
8. Michigan 9.62% (7,982 votes)

=== Electoral college selection ===
| Method of choosing electors | State(s) |
|---|---|
| Each Elector appointed by state legislature | South Carolina |
| Each Elector chosen by voters statewide | (all other States) |

== See also ==
- History of the United States (1849–1865)
- Inauguration of Franklin Pierce
- Second Party System
- 1852–53 United States House of Representatives elections
- 1852–53 United States Senate elections

== Works cited ==
- Abramson, Paul; Aldrich, John; Rohde, David (1995). Change and Continuity in the 1992 Elections. CQ Press. ISBN 0871878399.
- McPherson, James (1988). Battle Cry of Freedom. Oxford University Press. ISBN 9780195038637.

== Web sites ==
- "A Historical Analysis of the Electoral College". The Green Papers.
