= List of United States representatives in the 31st Congress =

This is a complete list of United States representatives during the 31st United States Congress listed by seniority.

As an historical article, the districts and party affiliations listed reflect those during the 31st Congress (March 4, 1849 – March 3, 1851). Seats and party affiliations on similar lists for other congresses will be different for certain members.

Seniority depends on the date on which members were sworn into office. Since many members are sworn in on the same day, subsequent ranking is based on previous congressional service of the individual and then by alphabetical order by the last name of the representative.

Committee chairmanship in the House is often associated with seniority. However, party leadership is typically not associated with seniority.

Note: The "*" indicates that the representative/delegate may have served one or more non-consecutive terms while in the House of Representatives of the United States Congress.

== U.S. House seniority list ==
U.S. House seniority
Rank	Representative	Party	District	Seniority date (Previous service, if any)	No.# of term(s)	Notes
1	Linn Boyd	D	KY-01	March 4, 1839; Previous service, 1835–1837.	7th term*	Dean of the House
2	Isaac E. Holmes	D	SC-06	March 4, 1839	6th term	Left the House in 1851.
3	Jacob Thompson	D	MS-01	March 4, 1839	6th term	Left the House in 1851.
4	John Reeves Jones Daniel	D	NC-06	March 4, 1841	5th term	
5	Robert C. Winthrop	W	MA-01	November 29, 1842; Previous service, 1840–1842.	7th term*	Resigned on July 30, 1850.
6	Joshua R. Giddings	W	OH-20	December 5, 1842; Previous service, 1838–1842.	8th term*	
7	James B. Bowlin	D	MO-01	March 4, 1843	4th term	Left the House in 1851.
8	Armistead Burt	D	SC-05	March 4, 1843	4th term	
9	Howell Cobb	D	GA-06	March 4, 1843	4th term	Speaker of the House; Left the House in 1851.
10	Andrew Johnson	D	TN-01	March 4, 1843	4th term	
11	George W. Jones	D	TN-05	March 4, 1843	4th term	
12	Hugh A. Haralson	D	GA-04	March 4, 1843	4th term	Left the House in 1851.
13	Daniel P. King	W	MA-02	March 4, 1843	4th term	Died on July 25, 1850.
14	George P. Marsh	W	VT-03	March 4, 1843	4th term	Resigned sometime in 1849.
15	John A. McClernand	D	IL-02	March 4, 1843	4th term	Left the House in 1851.
16	Julius Rockwell	W	MA-07	March 4, 1843	4th term	Left the House in 1851.
17	Robert C. Schenck	W	OH-03	March 4, 1843	4th term	Left the House in 1851.
18	Samuel Finley Vinton	W	OH-12	March 4, 1843; Previous service, 1823–1837.	11th term*	Left the House in 1851.
19	John Wentworth	D	IL-04	March 4, 1843	4th term	Left the House in 1851.
20	Joseph A. Woodward	D	SC-03	March 4, 1843	4th term	
21	Alexander H. Stephens	W	GA-07	October 2, 1843	4th term	
22	Joseph Grinnell	W	MA-10	December 7, 1843	4th term	Left the House in 1851.
23	Thomas H. Bayly	D	VA-07	May 6, 1844	4th term	
24	Isaac E. Morse	D	LA-04	December 2, 1844	4th term	Left the House in 1851.
25	George Ashmun	W	MA-06	March 4, 1845	3rd term	Left the House in 1851.
26	Meredith P. Gentry	W	TN-07	March 4, 1845; Previous service, 1839–1843.	5th term*	
27	Henry W. Hilliard	W	AL-02	March 4, 1845	3rd term	Left the House in 1851.
28	John W. Houston	W	DE	March 4, 1845	3rd term	Left the House in 1851.
29	Thomas B. King	W	GA-01	March 4, 1845; Previous service, 1839–1843.	5th term*	Resigned on March 3, 1850.
30	Lewis C. Levin	W	PA-01	March 4, 1845	3rd term	Left the House in 1851.
31	John S. Phelps	D	MO-05	March 4, 1845	3rd term	
32	Joseph M. Root	W	OH-21	March 4, 1845	3rd term	Left the House in 1851.
33	Frederick P. Stanton	D	TN-10	March 4, 1845	3rd term	
34	James Thompson	D	PA-23	March 4, 1845	3rd term	Left the House in 1851.
35	Robert Toombs	W	GA-08	March 4, 1845	3rd term	
36	Hugh White	W	NY-16	March 4, 1845	3rd term	Left the House in 1851.
37	David Wilmot	D	PA-12	March 4, 1845	3rd term	Left the House in 1851.
38	John H. Harmanson	D	LA-03	December 1, 1845	3rd term	Died on October 24, 1850.
39	Emile La Sére	D	LA-01	January 29, 1846	3rd term	Left the House in 1851.
40	James McDowell	D	VA-11	March 6, 1846	3rd term	Left the House in 1851.
41	David S. Kaufman	D	TX-01	March 30, 1846	3rd term	Died on January 31, 1851.
42	Franklin Welsh Bowdon	D	AL-07	December 7, 1846	3rd term	Left the House in 1851.
43	Shepherd Leffler	D	IA-02	December 29, 1846	3rd term	Left the House in 1851.
44	Kinsley S. Bingham	D	MI-03	March 4, 1847	2nd term	Left the House in 1851.
45	Albert G. Brown	D	MS-04	March 4, 1847; Previous service, 1839–1841.	3rd term*	
46	Thomas S. Bocock	D	VA-04	March 4, 1847	2nd term	
47	Chester Pierce Butler	W	PA-11	March 4, 1847	2nd term	Died on October 5, 1850.
48	Edward C. Cabell	W	FL	March 4, 1847; Previous service, 1845–1846.	3rd term*	
49	Thomas L. Clingman	W	NC-01	March 4, 1847; Previous service, 1843–1845.	3rd term*	
50	Williamson R. W. Cobb	D	AL-06	March 4, 1847	2nd term	
51	Harmon S. Conger	W	NY-25	March 4, 1847	2nd term	Left the House in 1851.
52	John Crowell	W	OH-19	March 4, 1847	2nd term	Left the House in 1851.
53	Rodolphus Dickinson	D	OH-06	March 4, 1847	2nd term	Died on March 20, 1849.
54	William Duer	W	NY-23	March 4, 1847	2nd term	Left the House in 1851.
55	Alexander Evans	W	MD-05	March 4, 1847	2nd term	Left the House in 1851.
56	Nathan Evans	W	OH-14	March 4, 1847	2nd term	Left the House in 1851.
57	Winfield S. Featherston	D	MS-02	March 4, 1847	2nd term	Left the House in 1851.
58	John Freedley	W	PA-05	March 4, 1847	2nd term	Left the House in 1851.
59	James S. Green	D	MO-03	March 4, 1847	2nd term	Left the House in 1851.
60	Daniel Gott	W	NY-24	March 4, 1847	2nd term	Left the House in 1851.
61	Willard Preble Hall	D	MO-04	March 4, 1847	2nd term	
62	Moses Hampton	W	PA-21	March 4, 1847	2nd term	Left the House in 1851.
63	Sampson W. Harris	D	AL-03	March 4, 1847	2nd term	
64	William Henry	W	VT-01	March 4, 1847	2nd term	Left the House in 1851.
65	Samuel W. Inge	D	AL-04	March 4, 1847	2nd term	Left the House in 1851.
66	Robert W. Johnson	D	AR	March 4, 1847	2nd term	
67	Job Mann	D	PA-19	March 4, 1847; Previous service, 1835–1837.	3rd term*	Left the House in 1851.
68	Robert M. McLane	D	MD-04	March 4, 1847	2nd term	Left the House in 1851.
69	John K. Miller	D	OH-11	March 4, 1847	2nd term	Left the House in 1851.
70	Charles S. Morehead	W	KY-08	March 4, 1847	2nd term	Left the House in 1851.
71	Jonathan D. Morris	D	OH-07	March 4, 1847	2nd term	Left the House in 1851.
72	William Nelson	W	NY-07	March 4, 1847	2nd term	Left the House in 1851.
73	Henry Nes	W	PA-15	March 4, 1847; Previous service, 1843–1845.	3rd term*	Died on September 10, 1850.
74	William A. Newell	W	NJ-02	March 4, 1847	2nd term	Left the House in 1851.
75	David Outlaw	W	NC-09	March 4, 1847	2nd term	
76	Charles H. Peaslee	D	NH-02	March 4, 1847	2nd term	
77	Lucius B. Peck	D	VT-04	March 4, 1847	2nd term	Left the House in 1851.
78	Harvey Putnam	W	NY-33	March 4, 1847; Previous service, 1838–1839.	3rd term*	Left the House in 1851.
79	Gideon Reynolds	W	NY-12	March 4, 1847	2nd term	Left the House in 1851.
80	John L. Robinson	D	IN-03	March 4, 1847	2nd term	
81	Robert L. Rose	W	NY-29	March 4, 1847	2nd term	Left the House in 1851.
82	David Rumsey	W	NY-30	March 4, 1847	2nd term	Left the House in 1851.
83	Augustine Henry Shepperd	W	NC-04	March 4, 1847; Previous service, 1827–1839 and 1841–1843.	9th term**	Left the House in 1851.
84	Peter H. Silvester	W	NY-11	March 4, 1847	2nd term	Left the House in 1851.
85	William Strong	D	PA-09	March 4, 1847	2nd term	Left the House in 1851.
86	John L. Taylor	W	OH-08	March 4, 1847	2nd term	
87	James Houston Thomas	D	TN-06	March 4, 1847	2nd term	Left the House in 1851.
88	John B. Thompson	W	KY-05	March 4, 1847; Previous service, 1840–1843.	4th term*	Left the House in 1851.
89	William Thompson	D	IA-01	March 4, 1847	2nd term	Resigned on June 29, 1850.
90	Amos Tuck	D	NH-01	March 4, 1847	2nd term	
91	Abraham W. Venable	D	NC-05	March 4, 1847	2nd term	
92	John Van Dyke	W	NJ-04	March 4, 1847	2nd term	Left the House in 1851.
93	James Wilson II	W	NH-03	March 4, 1847	2nd term	Resigned on September 9, 1850.
94	Richard K. Meade	D	VA-02	August 5, 1847	2nd term	
95	William A. Richardson	D	IL-05	December 6, 1847	2nd term	
96	Horace Mann	W	MA-08	April 3, 1848	2nd term	
97	Daniel Wallace	D	SC-01	June 12, 1848	2nd term	
98	John McQueen	D	SC-04	February 12, 1849	2nd term	
99	Nathaniel Albertson	D	IN-01	March 4, 1849	1st term	Left the House in 1851.
100	Henry P. Alexander	W	NY-17	March 4, 1849	1st term	Left the House in 1851.
101	Charles Allen	W	MA-05	March 4, 1849	1st term	
102	William J. Alston	W	AL-01	March 4, 1849	1st term	Left the House in 1851.
103	Josiah M. Anderson	W	TN-03	March 4, 1849	1st term	Left the House in 1851.
104	George R. Andrews	W	NY-14	March 4, 1849	1st term	Left the House in 1851.
105	William S. Ashe	D	NC-07	March 4, 1849	1st term	
106	Thomas H. Averett	D	VA-03	March 4, 1849	1st term	
107	Edward D. Baker	W	IL-06	March 4, 1849; Previous service, 1845–1847.	2nd term*	Left the House in 1851.
108	William Van Ness Bay	D	MO-02	March 4, 1849	1st term	Left the House in 1851.
109	James M. H. Beale	D	VA-14	March 4, 1849; Previous service, 1833–1837.	3rd term*	
110	Henry Bennett	W	NY-22	March 4, 1849	1st term	
111	William H. Bissell	D	IL-01	March 4, 1849	1st term	
112	David A. Bokee	W	NY-02	March 4, 1849	1st term	Left the House in 1851.
113	Walter Booth	D	CT-02	March 4, 1849	1st term	Left the House in 1851.
114	Richard Bowie	W	MD-01	March 4, 1849	1st term	
115	Daniel Breck	W	KY-06	March 4, 1849	1st term	Left the House in 1851.
116	George Briggs	W	NY-05	March 4, 1849	1st term	
117	James Brooks	W	NY-06	March 4, 1849	1st term	
118	Alexander W. Buel	D	MI-01	March 4, 1849	1st term	Left the House in 1851.
119	Lorenzo Burrows	W	NY-34	March 4, 1849	1st term	
120	Thomas B. Butler	W	CT-04	March 4, 1849	1st term	Left the House in 1851.
121	William J. Brown	D	IN-05	March 4, 1849; Previous service, 1843–1845.	2nd term*	Left the House in 1851.
122	Joseph Cable	D	OH-17	March 4, 1849	1st term	
123	George Caldwell	D	KY-04	March 4, 1849; Previous service, 1843–1845.	2nd term*	Left the House in 1851.
124	Joseph P. Caldwell	W	NC-02	March 4, 1849	1st term	
125	Samuel Calvin	W	PA-17	March 4, 1849	1st term	Left the House in 1851.
126	Lewis D. Campbell	W	OH-02	March 4, 1849	1st term	
127	David K. Cartter	D	OH-18	March 4, 1849	1st term	
128	Joseph Casey	W	PA-13	March 4, 1849	1st term	Left the House in 1851.
129	Joseph R. Chandler	W	PA-02	March 4, 1849	1st term	
130	Charles E. Clarke	W	NY-19	March 4, 1849	1st term	Left the House in 1851.
131	Chauncey F. Cleveland	D	CT-03	March 4, 1849	1st term	
132	William F. Colcock	D	SC-07	March 4, 1849	1st term	
133	Orasmus Cole	W	WI-02	March 4, 1849	1st term	Left the House in 1851.
134	Charles M. Conrad	W	LA-02	March 4, 1849	1st term	Resigned on August 17, 1850.
135	Moses Bledso Corwin	W	OH-04	March 4, 1849	1st term	Left the House in 1851.
136	Edmund Deberry	W	NC-03	March 4, 1849; Previous service, 1829–1831 and 1833–1845.	8th term**	Left the House in 1851.
137	Jesse C. Dickey	W	PA-07	March 4, 1849	1st term	Left the House in 1851.
138	Milo M. Dimmick	W	PA-10	March 4, 1849	1st term	
139	David T. Disney	D	OH-01	March 4, 1849	1st term	
140	Nathan F. Dixon II	W	RI-02	March 4, 1849	1st term	Left the House in 1851.
141	James D. Doty	D	WI-03	March 4, 1849; Previous service, 1839–1841.	3rd term*	
142	James H. Duncan	W	MA-03	March 4, 1849	1st term	
143	Cyrus L. Dunham	D	IN-02	March 4, 1849	1st term	
144	Charles Durkee	D	WI-01	March 4, 1849	1st term	
145	Henry A. Edmundson	D	VA-12	March 4, 1849	1st term	
146	Andrew Ewing	D	TN-08	March 4, 1849	1st term	Left the House in 1851.
147	Graham N. Fitch	D	IN-09	March 4, 1849	1st term	
148	Orin Fowler	W	MA-09	March 4, 1849	1st term	
149	Thomas J. D. Fuller	D	ME-07	March 4, 1849	1st term	
150	Elbridge Gerry	D	ME-01	March 4, 1849	1st term	Left the House in 1851.
151	Alfred Gilmore	D	PA-24	March 4, 1849	1st term	
152	Rufus K. Goodenow	W	ME-04	March 4, 1849	1st term	Left the House in 1851.
153	Herman D. Gould	W	NY-10	March 4, 1849	1st term	Left the House in 1851.
154	Willis A. Gorman	D	IN-06	March 4, 1849	1st term	
155	Thomas C. Hackett	D	GA-05	March 4, 1849	1st term	Left the House in 1851.
156	Ransom Halloway	W	NY-08	March 4, 1849	1st term	Left the House in 1851.
157	William T. Hamilton	D	MD-02	March 4, 1849	1st term	
158	Edward Hammond	D	MD-03	March 4, 1849	1st term	
159	Andrew J. Harlan	D	IN-10	March 4, 1849	1st term	Left the House in 1851.
160	Isham G. Harris	D	TN-09	March 4, 1849	1st term	
161	Thomas L. Harris	D	IL-07	March 4, 1849	1st term	Left the House in 1851.
162	Andrew K. Hay	W	NJ-01	March 4, 1849	1st term	Left the House in 1851.
163	William Hebard	W	VT-02	March 4, 1849	1st term	
164	David Hubbard	D	AL-05	March 4, 1849; Previous service, 1839–1841.	2nd term*	Left the House in 1851.
165	Harry Hibbard	D	NH-04	March 4, 1849	1st term	
166	Moses Hoagland	D	OH-16	March 4, 1849	1st term	Left the House in 1851.
167	Alexander Holladay	D	VA-08	March 4, 1849	1st term	
168	Volney Howard	D	TX-02	March 4, 1849	1st term	
169	John W. Howe	W	PA-22	March 4, 1849	1st term	
170	William F. Hunter	W	OH-15	March 4, 1849	1st term	
171	William T. Jackson	W	NY-26	March 4, 1849	1st term	Left the House in 1851.
172	James L. Johnson	W	KY-02	March 4, 1849	1st term	Left the House in 1851.
173	George W. Julian	D	IN-04	March 4, 1849	1st term	Left the House in 1851.
174	John B. Kerr	W	MD-06	March 4, 1849	1st term	Left the House in 1851.
175	George G. King	W	RI-01	March 4, 1849	1st term	
176	James G. King	W	NJ-05	March 4, 1849	1st term	Left the House in 1851.
177	John A. King	W	NY-01	March 4, 1849	1st term	Left the House in 1851.
178	Preston King	W	NY-18	March 4, 1849; Previous service, 1843–1847.	3rd term*	
179	Nathaniel Littlefield	D	ME-02	March 4, 1849; Previous service, 1841–1843.	2nd term*	Left the House in 1851.
180	Humphrey Marshall	W	KY-07	March 4, 1849	1st term	
181	John C. Mason	D	KY-09	March 4, 1849	1st term	
182	Orsamus B. Matteson	W	NY-20	March 4, 1849	1st term	Left the House in 1851.
183	Joseph E. McDonald	D	IN-08	March 4, 1849	1st term	Left the House in 1851.
184	Edward W. McGaughey	W	IN-07	March 4, 1849; Previous service, 1845–1847.	2nd term*	Left the House in 1851.
185	Thomas McKissock	W	NY-09	March 4, 1849	1st term	Left the House in 1851.
186	James Xavier McLanahan	D	PA-16	March 4, 1849	1st term	
187	Finis McLean	W	KY-03	March 4, 1849	1st term	Left the House in 1851.
188	Fayette McMullen	D	VA-13	March 4, 1849	1st term	
189	John Millson	D	VA-01	March 4, 1849	1st term	
190	Henry D. Moore	W	PA-03	March 4, 1849	1st term	
191	Jeremiah Morton	W	VA-09	March 4, 1849	1st term	Left the House in 1851.
192	Alexander Newman	D	VA-15	March 4, 1849	1st term	Died on September 8, 1849.
193	Andrew J. Ogle	W	PA-18	March 4, 1849	1st term	Left the House in 1851.
194	Edson B. Olds	D	OH-09	March 4, 1849	1st term	
195	James L. Orr	D	SC-02	March 4, 1849	1st term	
196	John Otis	W	ME-03	March 4, 1849	1st term	Left the House in 1851.
197	Allen F. Owen	W	GA-03	March 4, 1849	1st term	Left the House in 1851.
198	Richard Parker	D	VA-10	March 4, 1849	1st term	Left the House in 1851.
199	Jonas P. Phoenix	W	NY-03	March 4, 1849; Previous service, 1843–1845.	2nd term*	Left the House in 1851.
200	Charles W. Pitman	W	PA-14	March 4, 1849	1st term	Left the House in 1851.
201	Emery D. Potter	D	OH-05	March 4, 1849; Previous service, 1843–1845.	2nd term*	Left the House in 1851.
202	Paulus Powell	D	VA-05	March 4, 1849	1st term	
203	Robert R. Reed	W	PA-20	March 4, 1849	1st term	Left the House in 1851.
204	Elijah Risley	W	NY-31	March 4, 1849	1st term	Left the House in 1851.
205	John Robbins	D	PA-04	March 4, 1849	1st term	
206	Thomas Ross	D	PA-06	March 4, 1849	1st term	
207	William A. Sackett	W	NY-27	March 4, 1849	1st term	
208	John H. Savage	D	TN-04	March 4, 1849	1st term	
209	Cullen Sawtelle	D	ME-05	March 4, 1849; Previous service, 1845–1847.	2nd term*	Left the House in 1851.
210	Abraham M. Schermerhorn	W	NY-28	March 4, 1849	1st term	
211	John L. Schoolcraft	W	NY-13	March 4, 1849	1st term	
212	James Seddon	D	VA-06	March 4, 1849; Previous service, 1845–1847.	2nd term*	Left the House in 1851.
213	Elbridge G. Spaulding	W	NY-32	March 4, 1849	1st term	Left the House in 1851.
214	William Sprague	W	MI-02	March 4, 1849	1st term	Left the House in 1851.
215	Richard H. Stanton	D	KY-10	March 4, 1849	1st term	
216	Edward Stanly	W	NC-08	March 4, 1849; Previous service, 1837–1843.	4th term*	
217	Charles Stetson	D	ME-06	March 4, 1849	1st term	Left the House in 1851.
218	Thaddeus Stevens	W	PA-08	March 4, 1849	1st term	
219	Charles Sweetser	D	OH-10	March 4, 1849	1st term	
220	John R. Thurman	W	NY-15	March 4, 1849	1st term	Left the House in 1851.
221	Walter Underhill	W	NY-04	March 4, 1849	1st term	Left the House in 1851.
222	Hiram Walden	D	NY-21	March 4, 1849	1st term	Left the House in 1851.
223	Loren P. Waldo	D	CT-01	March 4, 1849	1st term	Left the House in 1851.
224	Albert G. Watkins	W	TN-02	March 4, 1849	1st term	
225	Marshall J. Wellborn	D	GA-02	March 4, 1849	1st term	Left the House in 1851.
226	William A. Whittlesey	D	OH-13	March 4, 1849	1st term	Left the House in 1851.
227	Isaac Wildrick	D	NJ-03	March 4, 1849	1st term	
228	Christopher H. Williams	W	TN-11	March 4, 1849; Previous service, 1837–1843.	4th term*	
229	Timothy R. Young	D	IL-03	March 4, 1849	1st term	Left the House in 1851.
	Thomas Haymond	W	VA-15	November 8, 1849	1st term	Left the House in 1851.
	James Meacham	W	VT-03	December 3, 1849	1st term	
	William McWillie	D	MS-03	December 3, 1849	1st term	Left the House in 1851.
	Amos E. Wood	D	OH-06	December 3, 1849	1st term	Died on November 19, 1850.
	Joseph W. Jackson	D	GA-01	March 4, 1850	1st term	
	Samuel A. Eliot	W	MA-01	August 22, 1850	1st term	Left the House in 1851.
	Edward Gilbert	D	CA	September 11, 1850	1st term	Left the House in 1851.
	George W. Wright	D	CA	September 11, 1850	1st term	Left the House in 1851.
	George W. Morrison	D	NH-03	October 8, 1850	1st term	Left the House in 1851.
	Joel B. Danner	D	PA-15	December 2, 1850	1st term	Left the House in 1851.
	Henry A. Bullard	W	LA-02	December 5, 1850; Previous service, 1831–1834.	3rd term*	Left the House in 1851.
	Daniel F. Miller	W	IA-01	December 20, 1850	1st term	Left the House in 1851.
	Alexander G. Penn	D	LA-03	December 30, 1850	1st term	
	John Bell	W	OH-06	January 7, 1851	1st term	Left the House in 1851.
	John Brisbin	D	PA-11	January 15, 1851	1st term	Left the House in 1851.

== Delegates ==
Rank	Delegate	Party	District	Seniority date (Previous service, if any)	No.# of term(s)	Notes
1	Henry Hastings Sibley	D	MN	July 7, 1849; Previous service, 1848–1849.	2nd term*	
2	Samuel Thurston	D	OR	December 3, 1849	1st term	

== See also ==
- 31st United States Congress
- List of United States congressional districts
- List of United States senators in the 31st Congress
