= United States House Committee on Alcoholic Liquor Traffic =

The Committee on Alcoholic Liquor Traffic was a standing committee of the U.S. House of Representatives from 1893 to 1927. It was preceded by a select committee formed in 1879 during the 46th Congress.

== History ==
The Select Committee on Alcoholic Liquor Traffic was established on May 16, 1879, pursuant to House resolution. The select committee terminated August 18, 1893, when it was made a standing committee

In 1890, the Select Committee recommended the creation of a presidentially appointed commission on alcoholic liquor traffic. The commission was to consist of 5 members, responsible for investigating "the alcoholic, fermented, and vinous liquor traffic, in all its phases, its relation to revenue and taxation, its effect upon labor, agriculture, manufacturing and other industries and its general economic, criminal, moral, and scientific, social vice, and the public health" among other issues.

== Jurisdiction ==
As its name suggests, the committee was responsible for all subjects relating to alcoholic liquor traffic, including the manufacture, distribution, and sale of intoxicating beverages in U.S. states, territories, government-owned buildings as well as the District of Columbia, Indian reservations, and military bases. The committee was also responsible for investigating issues related to the 18th Amendment to the U.S. Constitution, which established Prohibition, outlawing the production and sale of alcoholic beverages in the United States.

Official records of the committee generally include petitions and memorials requesting the appointment of a commission to study alcoholic traffic and praying for prohibition of the manufacture, sale, and distribution through interstate commerce of alcohol in the United States and in various locations under federal authority and its export to certain countries.

== Members, 52nd Congress ==
During the 52nd Congress, the committee was chaired by William E. Haynes of Ohio and the Ranking Member was Joseph D. Taylor of Ohio.

Majority	Minority
William E. Haynes, Chairman, Ohio; Richard H. Clarke, Alabama; Posey G. Lester, Virginia; Charles Barwig, Wisconsin; Thomas D. English, New Jersey; Joseph Bailey, Texas; Thomas Bowman, Iowa	Joseph D. Taylor, Ranking Member, Ohio; Elijah A. Morse, Massachusetts; Matthew Griswold, Pennsylvania; John T. Cutting, California
