= List of United States senators in the 31st Congress =

This is a complete list of United States senators during the 31st United States Congress listed by seniority from March 4, 1849, to March 3, 1851.

Order of service is based on the commencement of the senator's first term. Behind this is former service as a senator (only giving the senator seniority within their new incoming class), service as vice president, a House member, a cabinet secretary, or a governor of a state. The final factor is the population of the senator's state.

Senators who were sworn in during the middle of the two-year congressional term (up until the last senator who was not sworn in early after winning the November 1850 election) are listed at the end of the list with no number.

== Terms of service ==
Class	Terms of service of senators that expired in years
Class 3	Terms of service of senators that expired in 1849 (AL, AR, CT, FL, GA, IA, IL, IN, KY, LA, MD, MO, NC, NH, NY, OH, PA, SC, VT, and WI.)
Class 1	Terms of service of senators that expired in 1851 (CT, DE, FL, IN, MA, MD, ME, MI, MN, MO, MS, NJ, NY, OH, PA, RI, TN, TX, VA, VT, and WI.)
Class 2	Terms of service of senators that expired in 1853 (AL, AR, DE, GA, IA, IL, KY, LA, MA, ME, MI, MS, NC, NH, NJ, RI, SC, TN, TX, and VA.)

== U.S. Senate seniority list ==
U.S. Senate seniority
Rank	Senator (party-state)	Seniority date	Other factors
1	Thomas Hart Benton (D-MO)	August 10, 1821	
2	Samuel Shethar Phelps (W-VT)	March 4, 1839	
3	Daniel Sturgeon (D-PA)	January 14, 1840	
4	Willie Person Mangum (W-NC)	November 25, 1840	
5	John Macpherson Berrien (W-GA)	March 4, 1841	Former senator
6	Jacob Welsh Miller (W-NJ)	March 4, 1841	
7	William Lewis Dayton (W-NJ)	July 2, 1842	
8	James Alfred Pearce (W-MD)	March 4, 1843	Former representative (6 years); Maryland 15th in population (1840)
9	William Upham (W-VT)	March 4, 1843	
10	David Rice Atchison (D-MO)	October 14, 1843	
11	Daniel Stevens Dickinson (D-NY)	November 30, 1844	
12	Daniel Webster (W-MA)	March 4, 1845	Former senator (13 years)
13	Thomas Corwin (W-OH)	March 4, 1845	Former representative (9 years)
14	Hopkins Lacy Turney (D-TN)	March 4, 1845	Former representative (6 years)
15	Jesse D. Bright (D-IN)	March 4, 1845	Indiana 10th in population (1840)
16	Reverdy Johnson (W-MD)	March 4, 1845	Maryland 15th in population (1840)
17	Albert Collins Greene (W-RI)	March 4, 1845	Rhode Island 24th in population (1840)
18	John Davis (W-MA)	March 24, 1845	
19	David Levy Yulee (D-FL)	July 1, 1845	Former delegate
20	John Caldwell Calhoun (D-SC)	November 26, 1845	
21	Thomas Jefferson Rusk (D-TX)	February 21, 1846	
22	Samuel Houston (D-TX)	February 26, 1846	Former representative
23	George Edmund Badger (W-NC)	November 25, 1846	
24	Andrew Pickens Butler (D-SC)	December 4, 1846	
25	James M. Mason (D-VA)	January 21, 1847	
26	Robert M. T. Hunter (D-VA)	March 4, 1847	Former representative (8 years); Virginia 4th in population (1840)
27	Joseph Rogers Underwood (W-KY)	March 4, 1847	Former representative (8 years); Kentucky 6th in population (1840)
28	Stephen A. Douglas (D-IL)	March 4, 1847	Former representative (4 years)
29	John P. Hale (FS-NH)	March 4, 1847	Former representative (2 years)
30	Alpheus Felch (D-MI)	March 4, 1847	Former governor
31	James Ware Bradbury (D-ME)	March 4, 1847	Maine 13th in population (1840)
32	Henry Stuart Foote (D-MS)	March 4, 1847	Mississippi 17th in population (1840)
33	Solomon Weathersbee Downs (D-LA)	March 4, 1847	Louisiana 19th in population (1840)
34	John Hopkins Clarke (W-RI)	March 4, 1847	Rhode Island 24th in population (1840)
35	Presley Spruance (W-DE)	March 4, 1847	Delaware 26th in population (1840)
36	Jefferson Davis (D-MS)	August 10, 1847	
37	Roger Sherman Baldwin (W-CT)	November 11, 1847	
38	John Bell (W-TN)	November 22, 1847	
39	Wyman Bradbury Seavy Moor (D-ME)	January 5, 1848	
40	Solon Borland (D-AR)	March 30, 1848	
41	William K. Sebastian (D-AR)	May 12, 1848	
42	Hannibal Hamlin (D-ME)	June 8, 1848	Former representative (4 years); Maine 13th in population (1840)
43	Henry Dodge (D-WI)	June 8, 1848	Former delegate (4 years); Wisconsin 28th in population (1840)
44	Isaac Pigeon Walker (D-WI)	June 8, 1848	Wisconsin 28th in population (1840)
45	William Rufus de Vane King (D-AL)	July 1, 1848	
46	Benjamin Fitzpatrick (D-AL)	November 25, 1848	
47	Augustus Caesar Dodge (D-IA)	December 7, 1848	Former delegate (6 years)
48	George Wallace Jones (D-IA)	December 7, 1848	Former delegate (3 years)
49	John Wales (W-DE)	February 23, 1849	
50	Lewis Cass (D-MI)	March 4, 1849	Former senator
51	Salmon P. Chase (D-OH)	March 4, 1849	
52	William Dawson (W-GA)	March 4, 1849	
53	Jackson Morton (W-FL)	March 4, 1849	
54	Moses Norris, Jr. (D-NH)	March 4, 1849	
55	William H. Seward (W-NY)	March 4, 1849	
56	Truman Smith (W-CT)	March 4, 1849	
57	Pierre Soulé (D-LA)	March 4, 1849	
58	James Whitcomb (D-IN)	March 4, 1849	
59	James Cooper (W-PA)	March 4, 1849	
	James Shields (D-IL)	October 27, 1849	
	Jeremiah Clemens (D-AL)	November 30, 1849	
	David Stewart (W-MA)	December 6, 1849	
	Thomas Pratt (D-MD)	January 12, 1850	
	Franklin Elmore (D-SC)	April 11, 1850	
	Robert Barnwell (D-SC)	June 4, 1850	
	Thomas Ewing (W-OH)	July 20, 1850	
	Robert Winthrop (W-MA)	July 22, 1850	
	John C. Frémont (R-CA)	September 9, 1850	
	William M. Gwin (D-CA)	September 9, 1850	
	Robert Rhett (D-SC)	December 18, 1850	
	Robert Rantoul, Jr. (D-MA)	February 1, 1851	

== See also ==
- 31st United States Congress
- List of United States representatives in the 31st Congress
