= Daniel Duncan (Ohio politician) =

American politician

Member of the U.S. House of Representatives from Ohio's 10th district
- In office March 4, 1847 – March 3, 1849
- Preceded by: Columbus Delano
- Succeeded by: Charles Sweetser

Member of the Ohio House of Representatives from the Licking County district
- In office December 4, 1843 – December 1, 1844 Serving with Samuel White
- Preceded by: Isaac Green; Phelps Humphreys
- Succeeded by: P. N. O'Bannon

Personal details
- Born: July 22, 1806 Shippensburg, Pennsylvania
- Died: May 18, 1849 (aged 42) Washington, D.C.
- Resting place: Newark Graveyard
- Party: Whig
- Education: Jefferson College
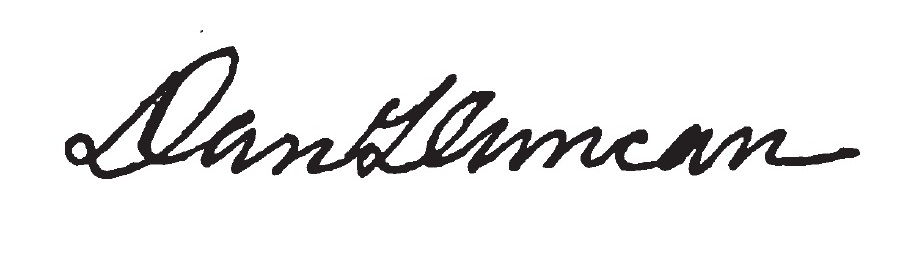
- Signature

Daniel Duncan (July 22, 1806 – May 18, 1849) was an American politician who served as the U.S. representative from Ohio's 10th congressional district from 1847 to 1849.

Born in Shippensburg, Pennsylvania, Duncan completed preparatory studies. He attended Jefferson College, Canonsburg, Pennsylvania, in 1825. He moved to Newark, Ohio, in 1828. He engaged in mercantile pursuits. He served as member of the State house of representatives in 1843. He was an unsuccessful Whig candidate for election to the State senate in 1844.

Duncan was elected as a Whig to the Thirtieth Congress (March 4, 1847 – March 3, 1849). He was an unsuccessful candidate for reelection in 1848 to the Thirty-first Congress. He died in Washington, D.C., on May 18, 1849. He was interred in the Newark Graveyard, Newark, Ohio.

== Sources ==
- United States Congress. "Daniel Duncan (id: D000529)". Biographical Directory of the United States Congress.

U.S. House of Representatives
Preceded by Columbus Delano	Member of the U.S. House of Representatives from Ohio's 10th congressional district 1847-1849	Succeeded by Charles Sweetser
