= Ralph Pomeroy Buckland =

American politician

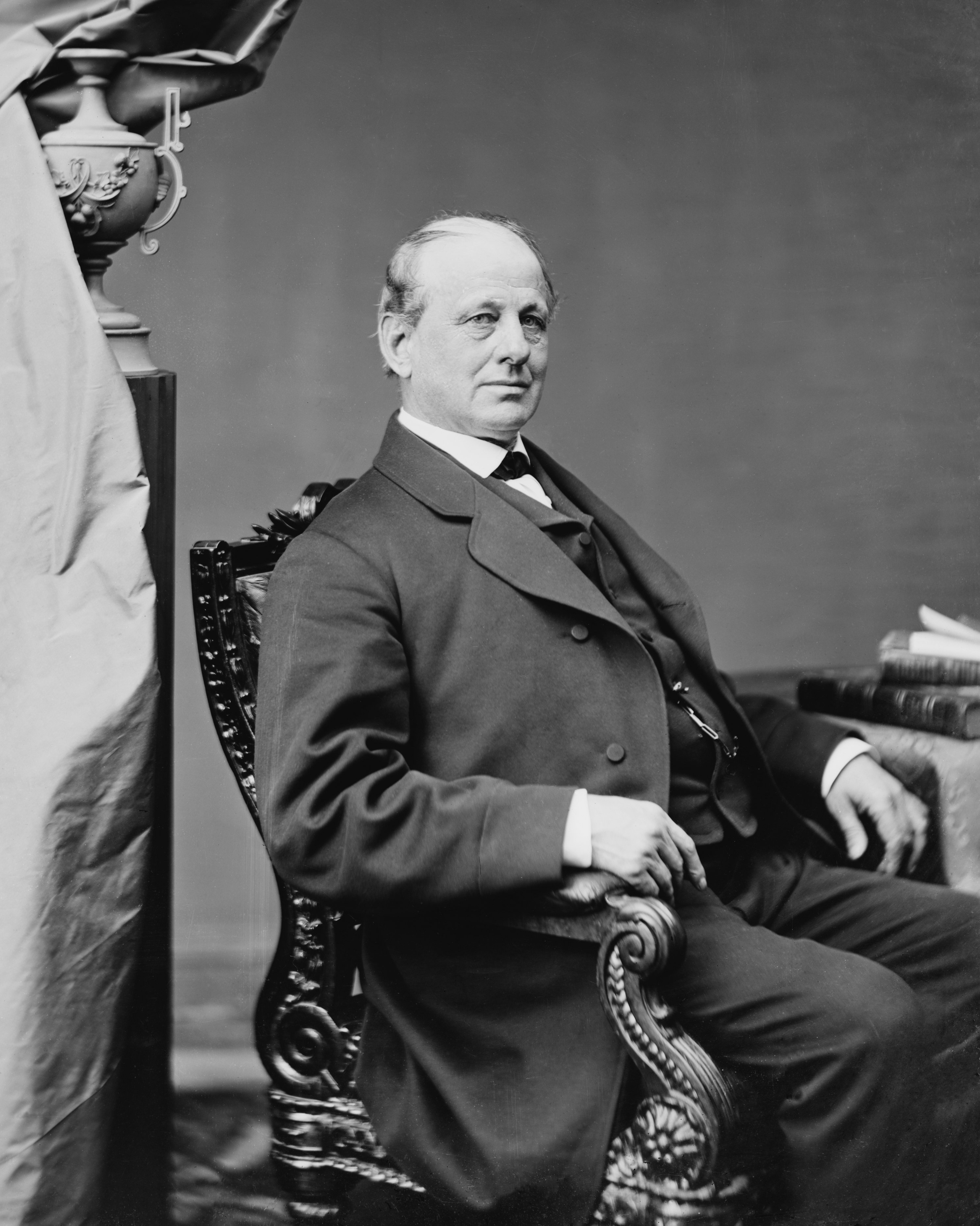
- Hon. Ralph Pomeroy Buckland of Ohio

Member of the U.S. House of Representatives from Ohio's 9th district
- In office March 4, 1865 – March 4, 1869
- Preceded by: Warren P. Noble
- Succeeded by: Edward F. Dickinson

Member of the Ohio Senate from the 30th district
- In office January 7, 1856 – January 1, 1860
- Preceded by: A. G. Sutton
- Succeeded by: F. D. Parish

Personal details
- Born: January 20, 1812 Leyden, Massachusetts
- Died: May 27, 1892 (aged 80) Fremont, Ohio
- Resting place: Oakwood Cemetery, Fremont, Ohio
- Party: Whig; Republican
- Education: Kenyon College

Military service
- Allegiance: United States of America; Union
- Branch/service: United States Army; Union Army
- Years of service: 1862–1865
- Rank: Brigadier General; Brevet Major General
- Unit: Army of the Tennessee
- Commands: 72nd Ohio Infantry
- Battles/wars: American Civil War; Battle of Shiloh; Siege of Vicksburg

Ralph Pomeroy Buckland (January 20, 1812 – May 27, 1892) was a U.S. representative from Ohio, as well as a brigadier general in the Union Army during the American Civil War and an executive of the Union Pacific Railroad following the war.

== Early life and career ==
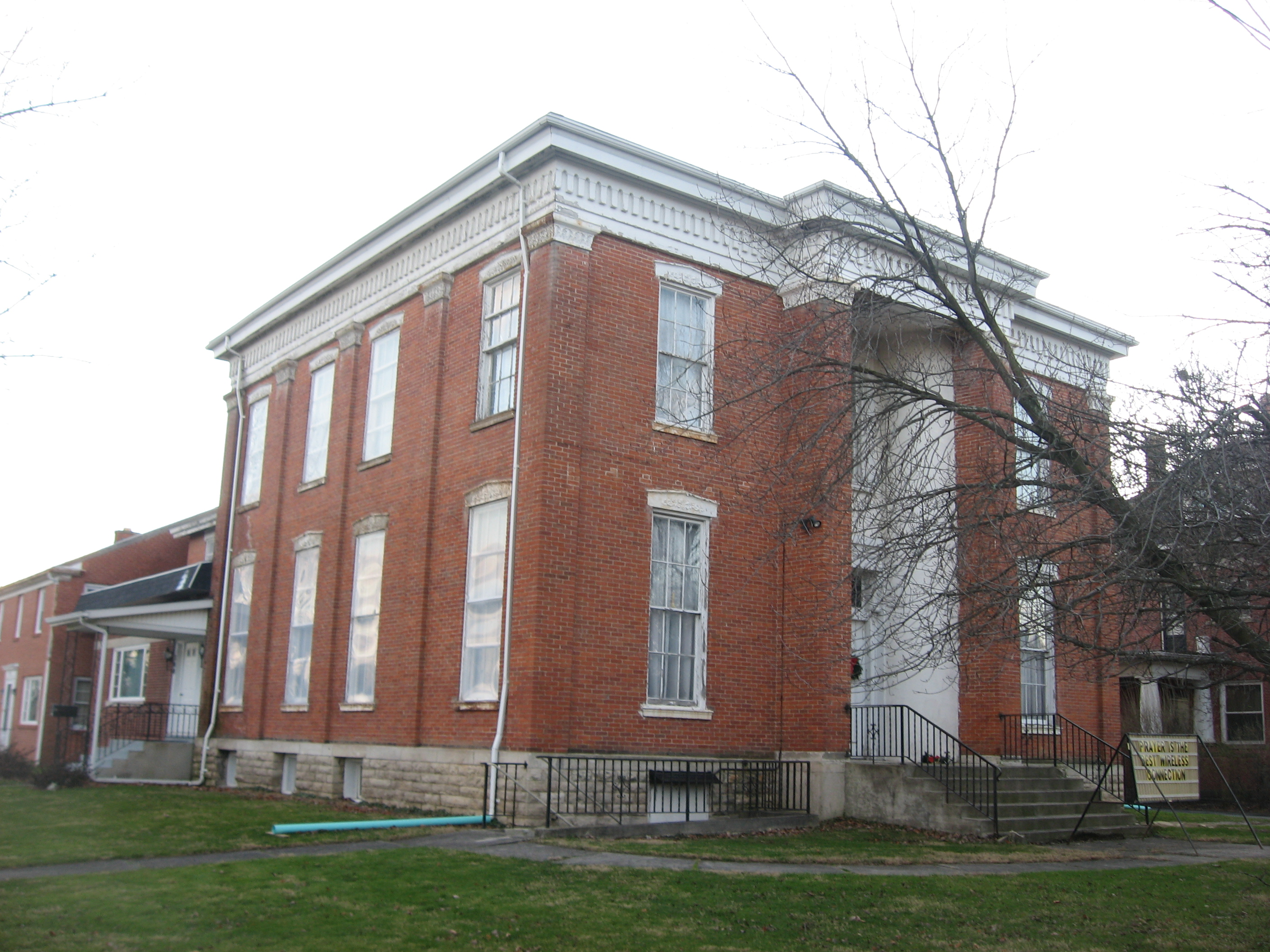
Buckland's house in Fremont

Born in Leyden, Massachusetts Buckland moved with his parents to Ravenna, Ohio, the same year. He attended the country schools, Tallmadge (Ohio) Academy, and Kenyon College in Gambier, Ohio. After studying law, he was admitted to the bar in 1837 and commenced practice in Fremont, Ohio. He served as the mayor of Fremont from 1843 to 1845 and was a delegate to the Whig National Convention in 1848. He served as a member of the Ohio State Senate from 1855 to 1859.

== Civil War service ==
With the outbreak of the Civil War, Buckland entered the Union Army as the colonel of the 72nd Ohio Infantry on January 10, 1862. Buckland commanded the Fourth Brigade in William T. Sherman's 5th Division of the Army of the Tennessee at the Battle of Shiloh in April. He was commissioned as a brigadier general of volunteers on November 29, 1862. During the Siege of Vicksburg in the spring and early summer of 1863, Buckland commanded a brigade in Sherman's XV Corps.

He resigned from the army on January 6, 1865, and returned to Ohio after winning election to the United States Congress. In the omnibus promotions following the surrender of the Confederate armies, he was brevetted as a major general dating from March 13, 1865.

== Postbellum career ==
Buckland was elected as a Republican to the Thirty-ninth and Fortieth Congresses (March 4, 1865 – March 4, 1869). He was not a candidate for renomination in 1868 to the Forty-first Congress. He resumed the practice of law and served as a delegate to the Philadelphia Loyalists' Convention in 1866 and to the Pittsburgh Soldiers' Convention.

He served as a delegate to the 1876 Republican National Convention. He spent his later years involved in the railroad industry, serving as government director of the Union Pacific Railroad from 1877 to 1880. Presidential elector in 1884 for Blaine/Logan.

On December 1, 1879, along with Attorneys E.F. Dickinson, Basil Meek, Homer Everett, William Ross and others, Buckland helped establish the Sandusky County Bar Association, serving as its first president for many years.

Buckland was one of the most prominent members of St. Paul's Episcopal Church in downtown Fremont. He died in Fremont on May 27, 1892, and was interred in Oakwood Cemetery.

== See also ==
- List of American Civil War generals (Union)
- List of Ohio's American Civil War generals
- Ohio in the American Civil War

U.S. House of Representatives
Preceded by Warren P. Noble	United States Representative from Ohio's 9th congressional district 1865–1869	Succeeded by Edward F. Dickinson
