= St. Paul's Episcopal Church (Fremont, Ohio) =

- U.S. National Register of Historic Places
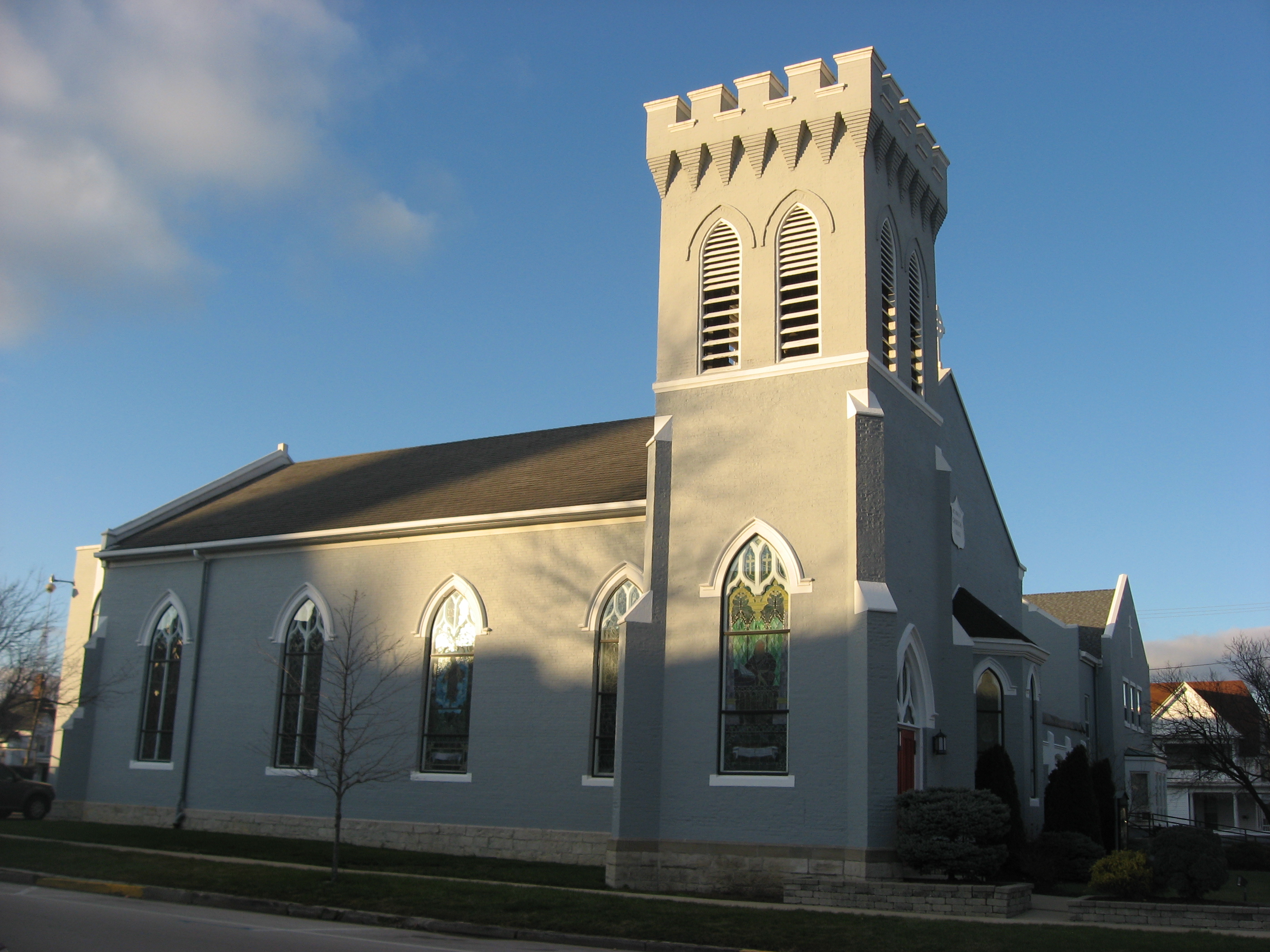
- Front and southern side

- Location within Ohio Location within the United States
- Location: 200 N. Park Ave., Fremont, Ohio
- Coordinates: 41°20′51″N 83°7′3″W
- Area: Less than 1 acre (0.40 ha)
- Built: 1843
- Architectural style: Gothic Revival
- NRHP reference No.: 77001085
- Added to NRHP: June 9, 1977

St. Paul's Episcopal Church is a historic Episcopalian church in Fremont, a city in the northwestern part of the U.S. state of Ohio. Built in the 1840s and expanded multiple times in the following decades, it has been named a historic site for its distinctive architecture.

In 2015, the church reported 158 members; in 2023, it reported 54 members. No membership statistics were reported in 2024 national parochial reports. Plate and pledge financial support reported by the church in 2023 was $134,511. Average Sunday Attendance (ASA) reported in 2024 was 30 persons. This was a relative decrease on ASA of 35 in 2023.

== Organic history ==
Fremont's first Protestant Episcopalian meeting was held on January 15, 1842, with twenty-eight individuals present. Parish officers were chosen ten days later, and the first meeting of the vestry in early February petitioned Bishop McIlvaine for a pastor. Before long, a priest began coming periodically from Norwalk, and a new priest was ordained in the following November, although he only served one year before resigning due to ill health.

In 1843, the members built a new church building on the northwestern corner of Main and Court Streets. Before this time, they had occupied multiple other locations; their first meetings were held in the Methodist church building, an old stone school-house that was later replaced with the city high school, and the courthouse. Funds were raised through pew rents and additional donations from the wealthier members. Bishop McIlvaine officially dedicated the building in late 1845. The interior was renovated and frescoed in 1859, and gas was introduced in 1861. Special attention was given to attract children to the Sunday school, and it grew immensely. Further renovations were performed in 1872 and 1873; more than $8000 was spent to enlarge the building, replace the furnace and carpet, and reconstruct other elements of the interior. At this time, plans were made to add a tower, and they were put into place in 1906. Until this time, it had been a small rectangular building with a simple gabled roof.

Among the parish's most prominent members have been Ralph Pomeroy Buckland, a general during the American Civil War, and Rutherford B. Hayes, 19th President of the United States.

== Architecture ==
St. Paul's is a thoroughly Gothic Revival structure with brick walls, a stone foundation, and elements of wood. Among its more distinctive elements is the square bell tower, which was constructed in 1906. The interior features components such as an octagonal baptistry, a pipe organ, frescoes, and a chancel and recess that were expanded in 1873. The interior is lit by stained glass windows and by massive chandeliers.

== Recent history ==
St. Paul's is a member parish of the Diocese of Ohio. In early 2013, its rector was Daniel Longsworth Orr.

In 1977, St. Paul's was listed on the National Register of Historic Places, qualifying because of its historically significant architecture. It is one of four National Register-listed properties on Park Avenue and one of seven in the city of Fremont.
