= Oakwood Cemetery (Fremont, Ohio) =

Cemetery in Sandusky County, Ohio

Coordinates: 41°19′47″N 83°08′19″W

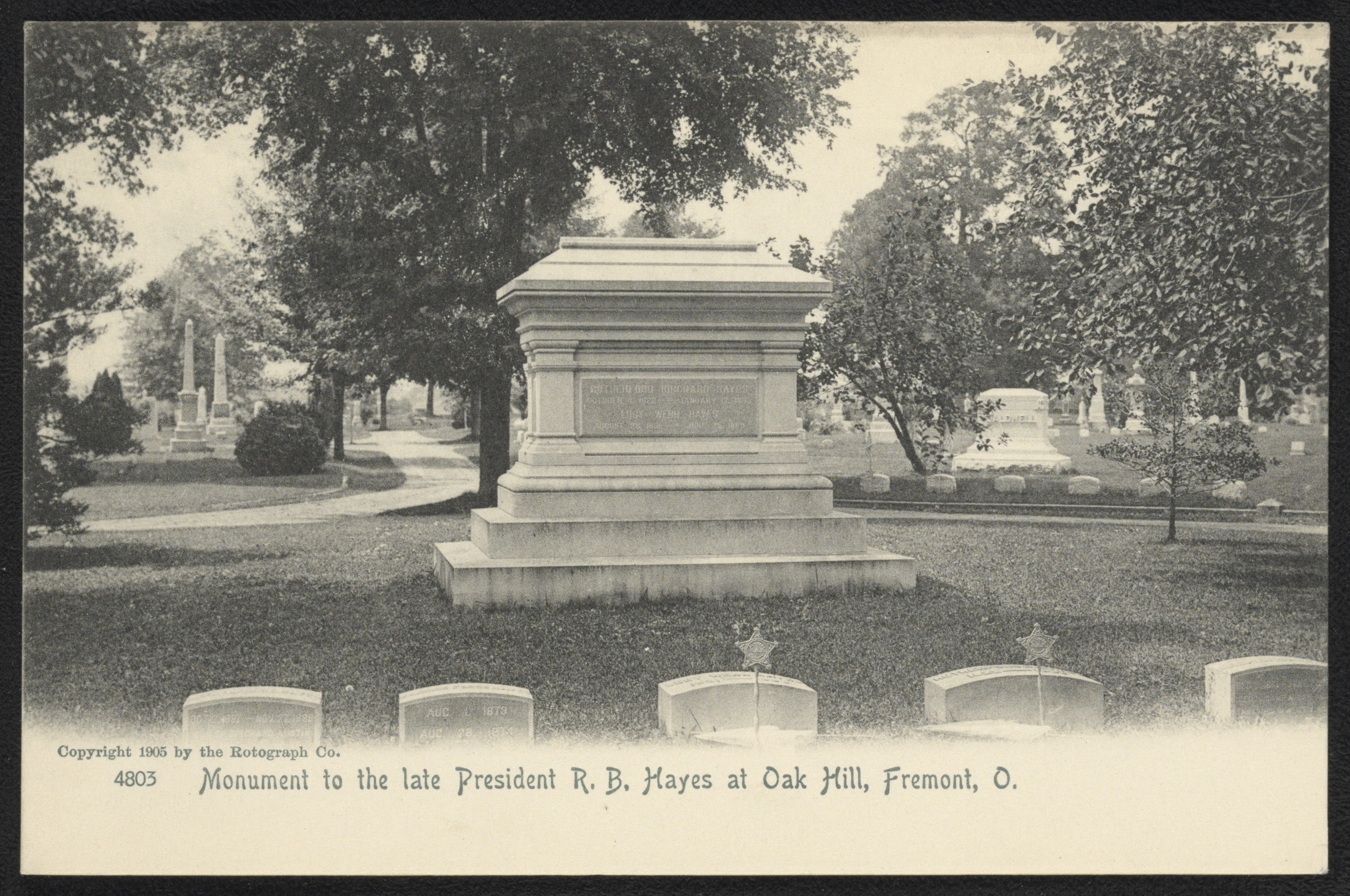
- 1905 postcard of Hayes' tomb at the cemetery
- Interactive map of Oakwood Cemetery

Details
- Established: 1858; 167 years ago
- Type: Public
- Owned by: Ballville Township, Ohio
- Size: 26 acres (11 ha)
- No. of graves: 25,000 (as of 2018)
- Find a Grave: Oakwood Cemetery

Oakwood Cemetery is a cemetery located in Ballville Township, Ohio, near the city of Fremont. The cemetery was established in 1858, and has been operated by Ballville Township since 2021.

== History ==
The Oakwood Cemetery Association purchased 26 acres (11 ha) of land in Ballville Township from James Vallette in 1858. Vallette's house, built in 1828, was not included in the sale and still stands as of 2018. Burials in the cemetery began in October 1860, including some reinterments from the nearby Whittlesey Street Cemetery.

A Jewish cemetery was established in Oakwood Cemetery in the 1880s, serving as the place of burial for members of Fremont's then-growing Jewish community. The first burial in the section was in 1885. United States President Rutherford B. Hayes (1822–1893) was buried at Oakwood Cemetery in 1893. His body was reinterred at his former home, Spiegel Grove, in 1915, along his wife Lucy Webb Hayes (1831–1889).

The Oakwood Cemetery Association began experiencing financial difficulties in the 2010s, as maintenance expenses increased and revenue from burials decreased. The cemetery had approximately 25,000 gravesites in 2018, when the cemetery association voted against transferring the property and operations to Ballville Township. The cemetery association considered the issue again in November 2021, and voted to dissolve itself and transfer its funds and properties to the township. The cemetery association's records are housed at the Rutherford B. Hayes Presidential Center.

== Notable interments ==
Other notable interments include:

- Carl C. Anderson (1877–1912), US Congressman
- William Francis Bailey (1842–1915), Wisconsin judge
- John S. Bell (1796–1869), US Congressman
- Sardis Birchard (1801–1874), merchant and property developer
- Ralph Pomeroy Buckland (1812–1892), Civil War Union Brigadier General and US Congressman
- Rodolphus Dickinson (1797–1849), US Congressman
  - Edward F. Dickinson (1829–1891), his son, US Congressman
- William Elisha Haynes (1829–1914), US Congressman
- Amos Henry Jackson (1846–1924), US Congressman
- John Birchard Rice (1832–1893), US Congressman
