= Charles Foster (Ohio politician) =

American politician and treasurer (1828–1904)

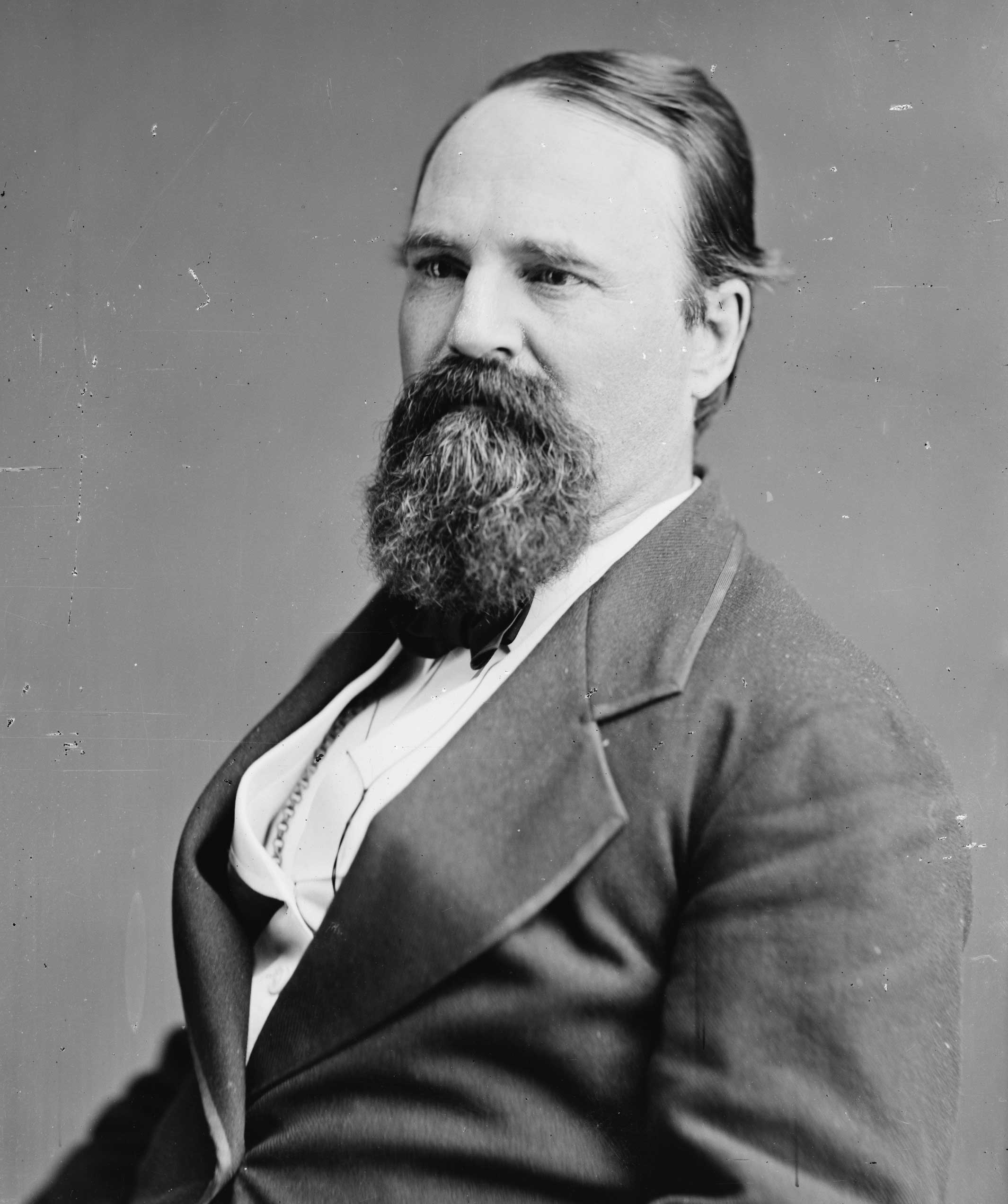
- Foster, c. 1865–1880

40th United States Secretary of the Treasury
- In office February 25, 1891 – March 6, 1893
- President: Benjamin Harrison
- Preceded by: William Windom
- Succeeded by: John G. Carlisle

35th Governor of Ohio
- In office January 12, 1880 – January 14, 1884
- Lieutenant: Andrew Hickenlooper
- Preceded by: Richard M. Bishop
- Succeeded by: George Hoadly

Member of the U.S. House of Representatives from Ohio
- In office March 4, 1871 – March 3, 1879
- Preceded by: Edward F. Dickinson
- Succeeded by: Thomas Ewing Jr.
- Constituency: 9th district (1871-1873); 10th district (1873-1879)

Personal details
- Born: Charles William Foster Jr. April 12, 1828 Tiffin, Ohio, U.S.
- Died: January 9, 1904 (aged 75) Springfield, Ohio, U.S.
- Party: Republican
- Spouse: Ann Olmstead
- Children: 2
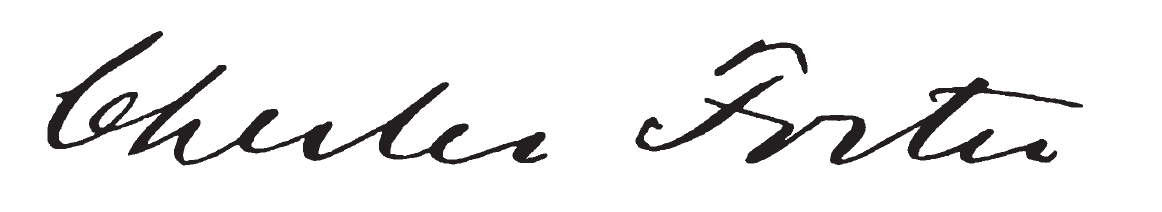
- Signature

Charles William Foster Jr. (April 12, 1828 – January 9, 1904) was a U.S. Republican politician from Ohio. Foster was the 35th governor of Ohio, and later went on to serve as Secretary of the Treasury under Benjamin Harrison. From 1871 to 1879, he served four terms in the U.S. House of Representatives.

== Biography ==
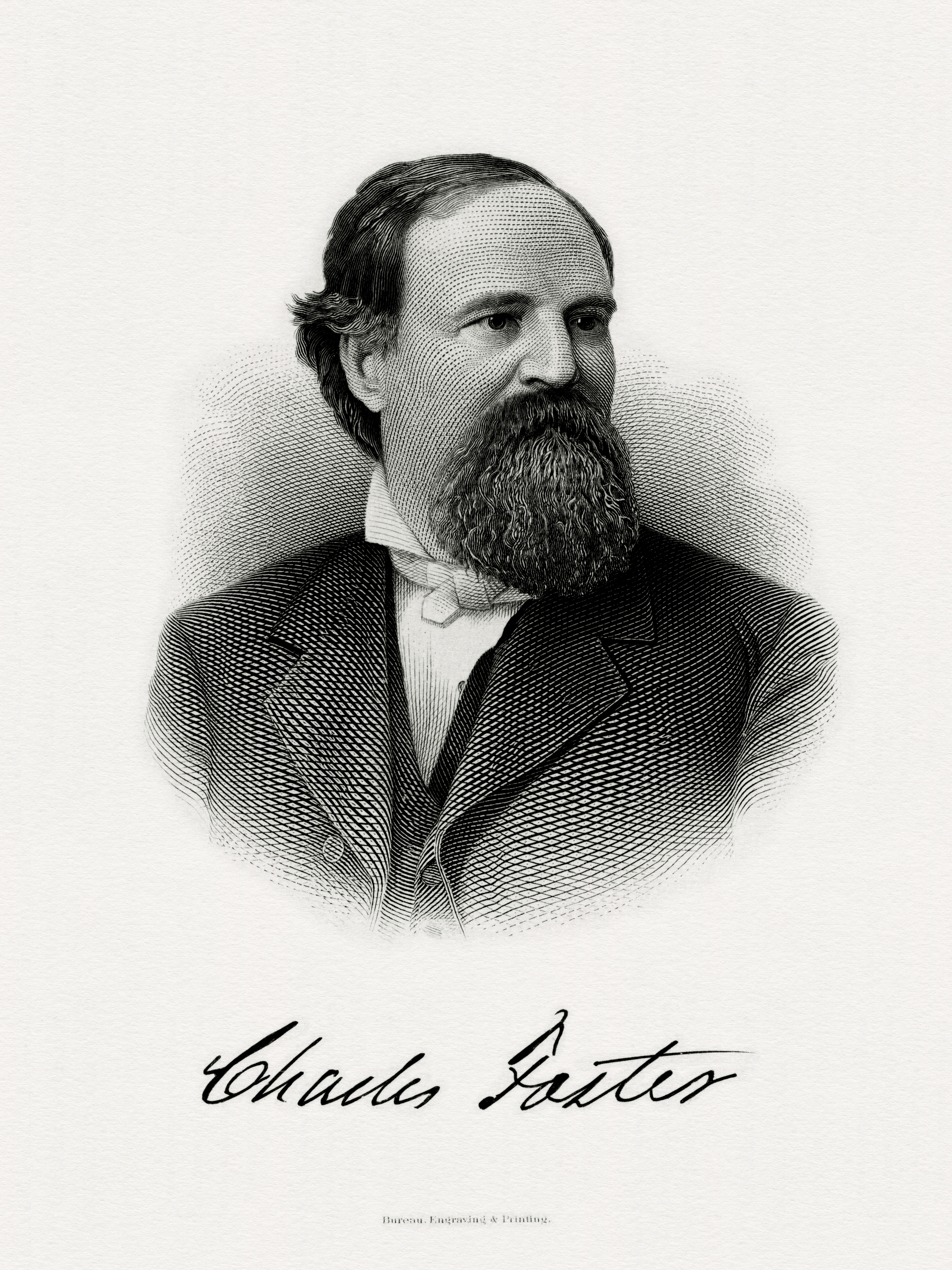
Bureau of Engraving and Printing portrait of Foster as Secretary of the Treasury.

Foster was born outside of Tiffin, Ohio, and grew up in the western Seneca County boomtown of Rome. This town would merge in 1854 with the nearby town of Risdon to form one city, named Fostoria in honor of Charles W. Foster Sr., his father.

=== Congress ===
He was elected to the United States House of Representatives in 1870, serving from 1871 to 1879. He was defeated for re-election in 1878.

=== Governor ===
He was elected to the governorship a year later, serving two two-year terms between 1880 and 1884.

=== Treasury Secretary ===
Foster was unsuccessful in a bid to return to the House in 1890, but was appointed by Benjamin Harrison a year later to become Secretary of the Treasury upon the death of William Windom. Foster served out the remainder of Harrison's term before retiring. From 1891 to 1893, future Postmaster General Robert Wynne served as his personal secretary.

During the transition, after Grover Cleveland won the presidential election, Harrison indicated to the United States Congress that there was a pending economic crisis. He also ignored the urging of individuals such as J.P. Morgan to take steps to reassure investors. One of the first clear signs of financial crisis came on February 20, 1893, twelve days prior to Cleveland's inauguration, when receivers were appointed for the Philadelphia and Reading Railroad, which had greatly overextended itself. Harrison and Foster did not take action, instead leaving the financial crisis at Cleveland's feet. Instead of addressing the economic crisis, Foster spent his final days as secretary posing for his official portrait. Republicans would ultimately go on to subsequently blame Cleveland for causing the economic downturn that he had, in actuality, inherited from the Republican Harrison.

=== Family ===
Charles Foster was married November 7, 1853 to Ann M. Olmstead of Fremont, Ohio. They had two daughters, Jessie and Anna.

== Death ==
On January 8, 1904, aged 75, Foster planned to attend the inauguration of Governor Myron T. Herrick. He stopped overnight at the home of his old friend, General J. Warren Keifer, in Springfield, Ohio. He died at Keifer's home the next day.

== Notes ==
U.S. House of Representatives
Preceded by Edward F. Dickinson	Member of the U.S. House of Representatives from Ohio's 9th congressional district 1871–1873	Succeeded by James Robinson
Preceded by Erasmus D. Peck	Member of the U.S. House of Representatives from Ohio's 10th congressional district 1873–1879	Succeeded by Thomas Ewing Jr.
Party political offices
Preceded by William H. West	Republican nominee for Governor of Ohio; 1879, 1881	Succeeded by Joseph B. Foraker
Political offices
Preceded by Richard M. Bishop	Governor of Ohio; 1880–1884	Succeeded by George Hoadly
Preceded by William Windom	United States Secretary of the Treasury; 1891–1893	Succeeded by John G. Carlisle
