= Edward F. Dickinson =

American politician (1829–1891)

Edward Fenwick Dickinson

Member of the U.S. House of Representatives from Ohio's 9th district
- In office March 4, 1869 – March 3, 1871
- Preceded by: Ralph P. Buckland
- Succeeded by: Charles Foster

Personal details
- Born: January 21, 1829 Fremont, Ohio
- Died: August 25, 1891 (aged 62) Fremont, Ohio
- Resting place: Oakwood Cemetery
- Party: Democratic
- Education: Xavier University

Military service
- Allegiance: United States
- Branch/service: Union Army
- Unit: 8th Ohio Infantry

Edward Fenwick Dickinson (January 21, 1829 – August 25, 1891) was an American politician who served as U.S. representative from Ohio for one term from 1869 to 1871. He was the son of Rodolphus Dickinson.

== Biography ==
Born in Fremont, Ohio, the son of Rodolphus Dickinson and Marguerite Beaugrand Dickinson, Dickinson attended the public schools. He graduated from St. Xavier College in Cincinnati, where he had studied law. After he was admitted to the bar, he commenced practice in Fremont. Dickinson served as prosecuting attorney of Sandusky County, Ohio from 1852 until his resignation two years later.

In 1852, he married Henrietta R. Mitchner. They had three children.

During the Civil War, he served in the Union Army as a lieutenant. Later, he was promoted to captain and served as regimental quartermaster of Company G, 8th Ohio Volunteer Infantry. When the war ended, Dickinson became a probate judge of Sandusky County from 1866 until 1869.

Dickinson was elected as a Democrat to the Forty-first Congress (March 4, 1869 – March 3, 1871). However, he was an unsuccessful candidate for reelection in 1870. Because of this, he resumed the practice of his profession.

Dickinson was elected mayor of Fremont in 1871, 1873 and 1875. He again served as probate judge of Sandusky County from 1877 to 1879 and from 1885 until his death. He died in Fremont in 1891 and was interred in Oakwood Cemetery.

== Sources ==
- United States Congress. "Edward F. Dickinson (id: D000320)". Biographical Directory of the United States Congress.

U.S. House of Representatives
Preceded by Ralph P. Buckland	Member of the U.S. House of Representatives from Ohio's 9th congressional district March 4, 1869–March 3, 1871	Succeeded by Charles Foster
