= Henry St. John (Ohio politician) =

American politician

Member of the U.S. House of Representatives from Ohio's 6th district
- In office March 4, 1843 – March 3, 1847
- Preceded by: Calvary Morris
- Succeeded by: Rodolphus Dickinson

Personal details
- Born: July 16, 1783 Washington County, Vermont
- Died: May 17, 1869 (aged 85) Tiffin, Ohio
- Party: Democratic

Military service
- Allegiance: United States
- Branch/service: United States Army
- Battles/wars: War of 1812

Henry St. John (July 16, 1783 – May 17, 1869) was a U.S. representative from Ohio.

== Biography ==
Born in Washington County, Vermont, St. John received limited schooling. He served during the War of 1812 before moving to Wooster, Ohio, in 1815. Later, he moved to Crawford County, Ohio. In 1837, he settled in Seneca County, where he engaged in agricultural pursuits, milling, and storekeeping near Tiffin, Ohio.

St. John was elected as a Democrat to the Twenty-eighth and Twenty-ninth Congresses (March 4, 1843 – March 3, 1847). He was not a candidate for renomination. After leaving Congress, he resumed agricultural pursuits. Resided in Tiffin, Ohio, where he died in May 1869.

== Sources ==
- United States Congress. "Henry St. John (id: S000767)". Biographical Directory of the United States Congress.

U.S. House of Representatives
Preceded by Calvary Morris	Member of the U.S. House of Representatives from Ohio's 6th congressional district 1843–1847	Succeeded by Rodolphus Dickinson
