= Amos E. Wood =

American politician

Amos Eastman Wood

Member of the U.S. House of Representatives from Ohio's 6th district
- In office December 3, 1849 – November 19, 1850
- Preceded by: Rodolphus Dickinson
- Succeeded by: John Bell

Member of the Ohio House of Representatives from Sandusky County
- In office December 7, 1840 – December
- Preceded by: John Welch
- Succeeded by: Henry C. Brish; G. W. Baird

Member of the Ohio Senate from Sandusky County
- In office December 2, 1844 – December 6, 1846
- Preceded by: Moses McEnally
- Succeeded by: Henry Cronise

Personal details
- Born: January 2, 1810 Ellisburg, New York
- Died: November 19, 1850 (aged 40) Woodville, Ohio
- Resting place: Woodville Cemetery
- Party: Democratic

Amos Eastman Wood (January 2, 1810 – November 19, 1850) was a U.S. representative from Ohio from 1849 to 1850.

== Biography ==
Born in Ellisburg, New York, Wood attended the common schools. He moved to Sandusky County, Ohio, in 1833 and engaged in agricultural pursuits. He served as member of the Ohio House of Representatives 1840–1842, and served in the Ohio Senate in 1845.

=== Congress ===
Wood was elected as a Democrat to the Thirty-first Congress to fill the vacancy caused by the death of Rodolphus Dickinson and served from December 3, 1849, until his death in Fort Wayne, Indiana, November 19, 1850. He was interred in Woodville Cemetery, Woodville, Ohio.

== See also ==
- List of members of the United States Congress who died in office (1790–1899)

== Sources ==
- United States Congress. "Amos E. Wood (id: W000689)". Biographical Directory of the United States Congress.

U.S. House of Representatives
Preceded by Rodolphus Dickinson	Member of the U.S. House of Representatives from Ohio's 6th congressional district December 3, 1849–November 19, 1850	Succeeded by John Bell
Ohio House of Representatives
Preceded by John Welch	Representative from Sandusky County; December 7, 1840-December 4, 1842; Served alongside: Moses McAnelly; G. W. Baird	Succeeded by Henry C. Brish; G. W. Baird
Ohio Senate
Preceded by Moses McEnally	Senator from Sandusky area December 2, 1844-December 6, 1846	Succeeded by Henry Cronise
