= William E. Haynes =

American politician

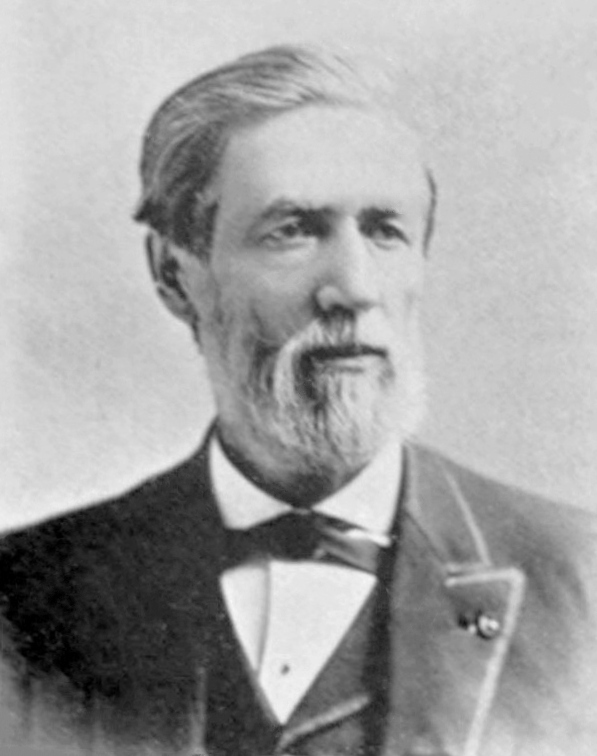

Member of the U.S. House of Representatives from Ohio
- In office March 4, 1889 – March 3, 1893
- Preceded by: Jacob Romeis
- Succeeded by: George W. Wilson
- Constituency: 7th district (1889–1891); 10th district (1891–1893)

Personal details
- Born: William Elisha Haynes; October 19, 1829 Hoosick Falls, New York, U.S.
- Died: December 5, 1914 (aged 85) Fremont, Ohio, U.S.
- Resting place: Oakwood Cemetery
- Party: Democratic
- Spouse: Maria H. Harmon
- Children: three
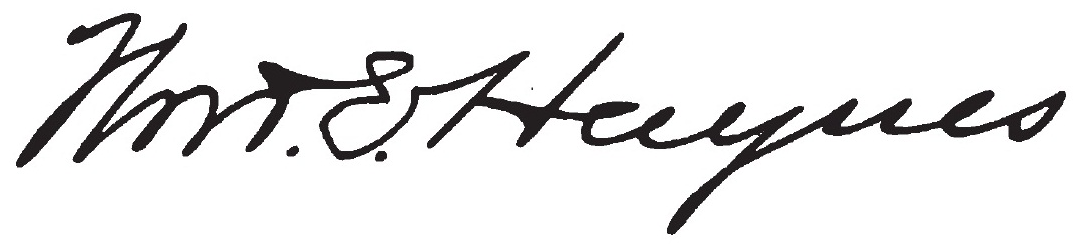
- Signature

Military service
- Allegiance: United States of America
- Branch/service: United States Army; Union Army
- Years of service: April 16, 1861 – April 12, 1864
- Rank: Lieutenant colonel
- Unit: 8th Ohio Infantry; 10th Ohio Cavalry

William Elisha Haynes (October 19, 1829 – December 5, 1914) was an American newspaperman, merchant and Civil War veteran who served two terms as a U.S. representative from Ohio from 1889 to 1893. He was a cousin of George William Palmer.

== Early life and career ==
Hayes was born in Hoosick Falls, New York, on October 19, 1829. In 1839, Haynes moved to Ohio with his parents, where they settled in Lower Sandusky (now Fremont). There, he attended the common schools. He apprenticed as a printer.

He worked at the Sandusky Clarion and the Cleveland Plain Dealer.

He served as clerk on a steamer on Lake Superior in 1848 and 1849. He engaged in mercantile pursuits at Fremont from 1850 to 1856. He served as auditor of Sandusky County, Ohio from 1856 to 1860.

== Civil War ==
Haynes enlisted in the Union Army as a private April 16, 1861, in the Eighth Regiment, Ohio Volunteer Infantry. He was commissioned captain and served in western Virginia, the Shenandoah Valley, and in the Army of the Potomac until November 1862, when he was commissioned lieutenant colonel of the 10th Ohio Cavalry, and served with it in the Army of the Cumberland until 1864, when he was honorably discharged.

=== Political career ===
He served as collector of internal revenue for the ninth district of Ohio in 1866 and 1867. He again engaged in mercantile pursuits from 1866 to 1873. He engaged in banking from 1873 to 1914.

He served as delegate to the Democratic National Convention in 1880 and 1884.

== Congress ==
Haynes was elected as a Democrat to the Fifty-first and Fifty-second Congresses (March 4, 1889 – March 3, 1893). He declined to be a candidate for renomination in 1892.

== Later career and death ==
He resumed banking in Fremont, Ohio, in which he continued until his death there on December 5, 1914. He was interred in Oakwood Cemetery in Fremont.

=== Family ===
Haynes was married to Maria H. Harmon of Fremont on February 8, 1855. They had children named Julia M., William P., and George W. Haynes.

U.S. House of Representatives
Preceded by Jacob Romeis	Member of the U.S. House of Representatives from Ohio's 10th congressional district March 4, 1889 – March 3, 1891	Succeeded by Robert E. Doan
Preceded by Henry Lee Morey	Member of the U.S. House of Representatives from Ohio's 7th congressional district March 4, 1891 – March 3, 1893	Succeeded by George W. Wilson
