= John Bell (Ohio politician) =

American politician

Member of the U.S. House of Representatives from Ohio's 6th district
- In office January 7, 1851 – March 3, 1851
- Preceded by: Amos E. Wood
- Succeeded by: Frederick W. Green

Personal details
- Born: June 19, 1796 Pennsboro, Pennsylvania
- Died: May 4, 1869 (aged 72) Fremont, Ohio
- Resting place: Oakwood Cemetery
- Party: Whig

John Bell (June 19, 1796 – May 4, 1869) was a U.S. representative from Ohio for two months in 1851, filling a vacancy created by his predecessor’s death.

== Life and career ==
Born in Pennsboro, Pennsylvania, Bell received a limited education. He moved to Ohio in 1810 with his parents, who settled in Greene County, near Xenia. He moved to Lower Sandusky in 1823 and served as mayor in 1830. He was the probate judge of Sandusky County for several terms.

Bell was commissioned a major general in the state militia in 1834 and commanded Ohio forces in the Toledo War the next year.

He served as postmaster of Lower Sandusky from November 14, 1838, to May 3, 1841. He served as member of the state house of representatives in 1844 and 1845. He served as mayor of Fremont, Ohio, in 1845 and 1846.

Bell was elected as a Whig to the Thirty-first Congress to fill the vacancy caused by the death of Amos E. Wood (January 7, 1851 – March 4, 1851).

== Death ==
He was a probate judge from 1852 to 1855 and again from 1858 to 1863. He died in Fremont, Ohio, on May 4, 1869, and was interred in Oakwood Cemetery (Fremont, Ohio).

U.S. House of Representatives
Preceded by Amos E. Wood	Member of the U.S. House of Representatives from Ohio's 6th congressional district January 7, 1851 – March 4, 1851	Succeeded by Frederick W. Green
Ohio House of Representatives
Preceded by William C. Craighill; Samuel Wagoner	Representative from Sandusky County; December 2, 1844 – December 6, 1846	Succeeded by Matthew M. Coe
