= Charles Sweetser =

American politician (1808–1864)

Member of the U.S. House of Representatives from Ohio's 10th district
- In office March 4, 1849 – March 3, 1853
- Preceded by: Daniel Duncan
- Succeeded by: John L. Taylor

Personal details
- Born: January 22, 1808 Dummerston, Vermont, U.S.
- Died: April 15, 1864 (aged 56) Delaware, Ohio, U.S.
- Cause of death: Heart disease
- Resting place: Oak Grove Cemetery, Delaware, Ohio, U.S.
- Party: Democratic
- Spouse: Ann Pamelia Ball (m. 1846)
- Children: 2
- Parent(s): William Sweetser; Delight Pierce
- Profession: Politician, lawyer

Charles Sweetser (January 22, 1808 – April 14, 1864) was an American politician and lawyer who served two terms in the United States House of Representatives from 1849 to 1853, representing the 10th congressional district of Ohio as a Democrat in the 31st United States Congress and the 32nd United States Congress.

== Early life and education ==
Sweetser was born in Dummerston, Vermont, on January 22, 1808, to William Sweetser and Delight Pierce. In 1817, Sweetser and his parents moved to Delaware, Ohio, where he studied law.

== Career ==
Sweetser was admitted to the bar in 1832; he commenced practice in Delaware, Ohio.

=== Congress ===
Sweetser served in the United States House of Representatives from 1849 to 1953, representing the 10th congressional district of Ohio as a Democrat in the 31st United States Congress and the 32nd United States Congress. While in the latter Congress, Sweetser served as chairman of the Committee on Public Expenditures.

Sweetser's time in office began on March 4, 1849 and concluded on March 3, 1853. He was preceded by Daniel Duncan and succeeded by John L. Taylor.

=== Later career ===
Following his tenure in Congress, Sweetser resumed practicing law.

== Personal life ==
In 1846, Sweetser married Ann Pamelia Ball, with whom he had two children.

== Death and burial ==
Sweetser died of heart disease at the age of 56 in Delaware, Ohio, on April 14, 1864. He was interred in Oak Grove Cemetery.

U.S. House of Representatives
Preceded by Daniel Duncan	Member of the U.S. House of Representatives from Ohio's 10th congressional district 1849-1853	Succeeded by John L. Taylor
