= Rodolphus Dickinson =

American politician (1797–1849)

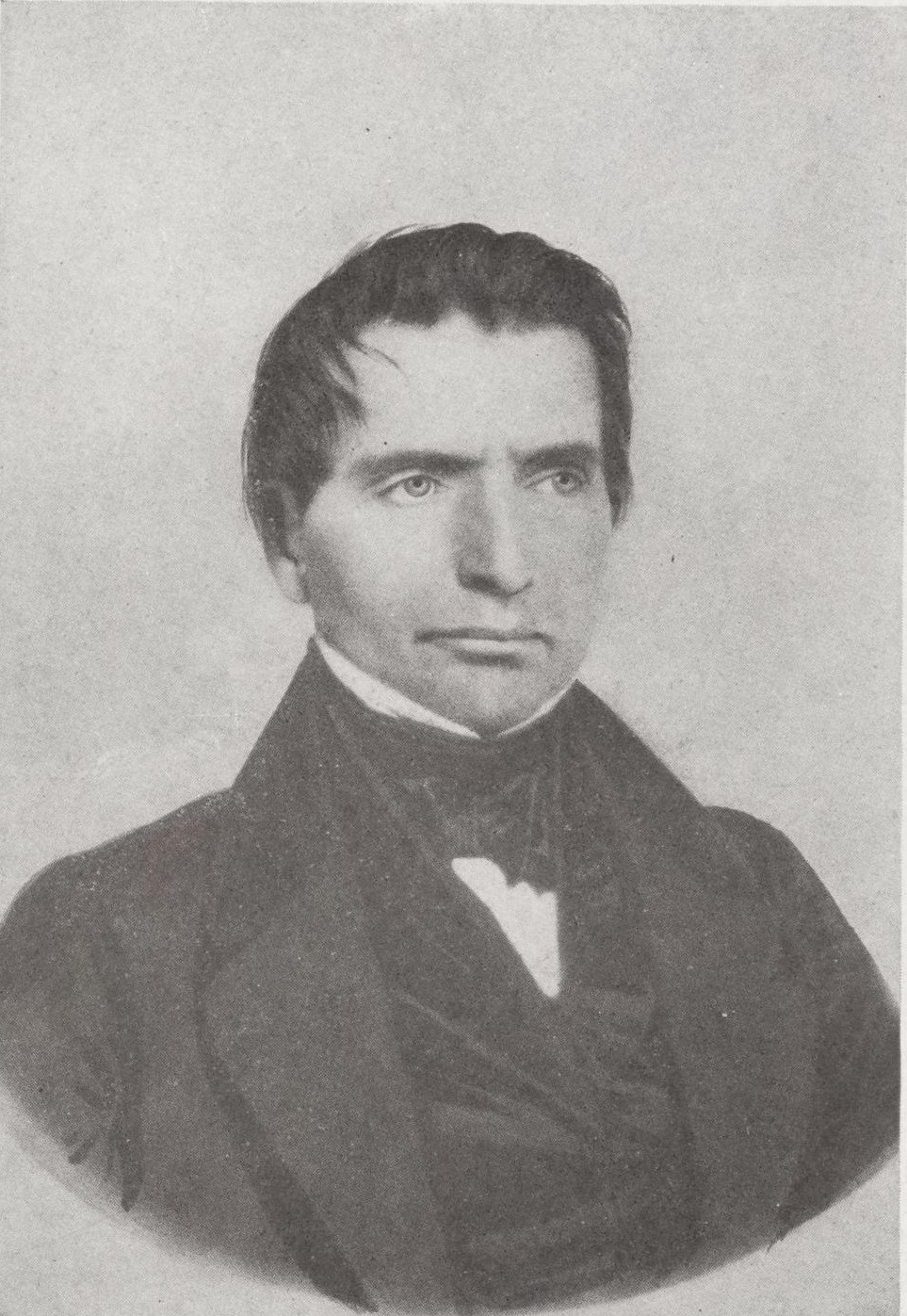

Member of the U.S. House of Representatives from Ohio's 6th district
- In office March 4, 1847 – March 20, 1849
- Preceded by: Henry St. John
- Succeeded by: Amos E. Wood

Personal details
- Born: December 28, 1797 Hatfield, Massachusetts
- Died: March 20, 1849 (aged 51) Washington, D.C.
- Resting place: Oakwood Cemetery (Fremont, Ohio)
- Party: Democratic
- Spouse: Marguerite Beaugrand
- Education: Williams College

Rodolphus Dickinson (December 28, 1797 – March 20, 1849) was an American lawyer and politician who served one term as a U.S. representative from Ohio from 1847 to 1849.

He was the father of Edward F. Dickinson.

== Biography ==
Born in Hatfield, Massachusetts, Dickinson attended the public schools and Williams College, Williamstown, Massachusetts from 1818 to 1821. He studied law with Gustavus Swan of Columbus, Ohio.

=== Lawyer ===
He was admitted to the bar and commenced practice in Tiffin, Ohio. He was appointed prosecuting attorney for Seneca County in 1824, for Williams County in 1826, and for Sandusky County in 1827.

He moved to Lower Sandusky, Ohio, in 1826. He served as a member of the Board of Public Works of Ohio 1836–1845.

=== Congress ===
Dickinson was elected as a Democrat to the Thirtieth and Thirty-first Congresses and served from March 4, 1847, until his death in Washington, D.C., on March 20, 1849.

He was temporarily interred in Washington, D.C., then permanently reinterred in Oakwood Cemetery (Fremont, Ohio). His wife was Marguerite Beaugrand from Lower Sandusky.

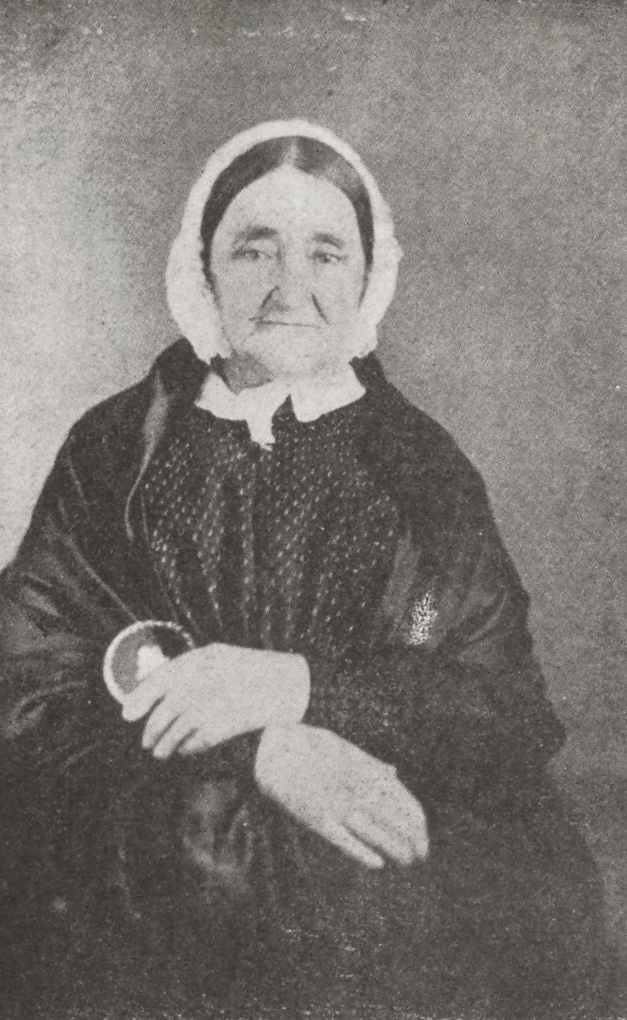
Marguerite Beaugrand married Rodolphus Dickinson

== See also ==
- List of members of the United States Congress who died in office (1790–1899)

== Sources ==
- United States Congress. "Rodolphus Dickinson (id: D000325)". Biographical Directory of the United States Congress.

U.S. House of Representatives
Preceded by Henry St. John	Member of the U.S. House of Representatives from Ohio's 6th congressional district 1847–1849	Succeeded by Amos E. Wood
