= 31st United States Congress =

1849–1851 U.S. Congress

| ← | 30th | 32nd | → |
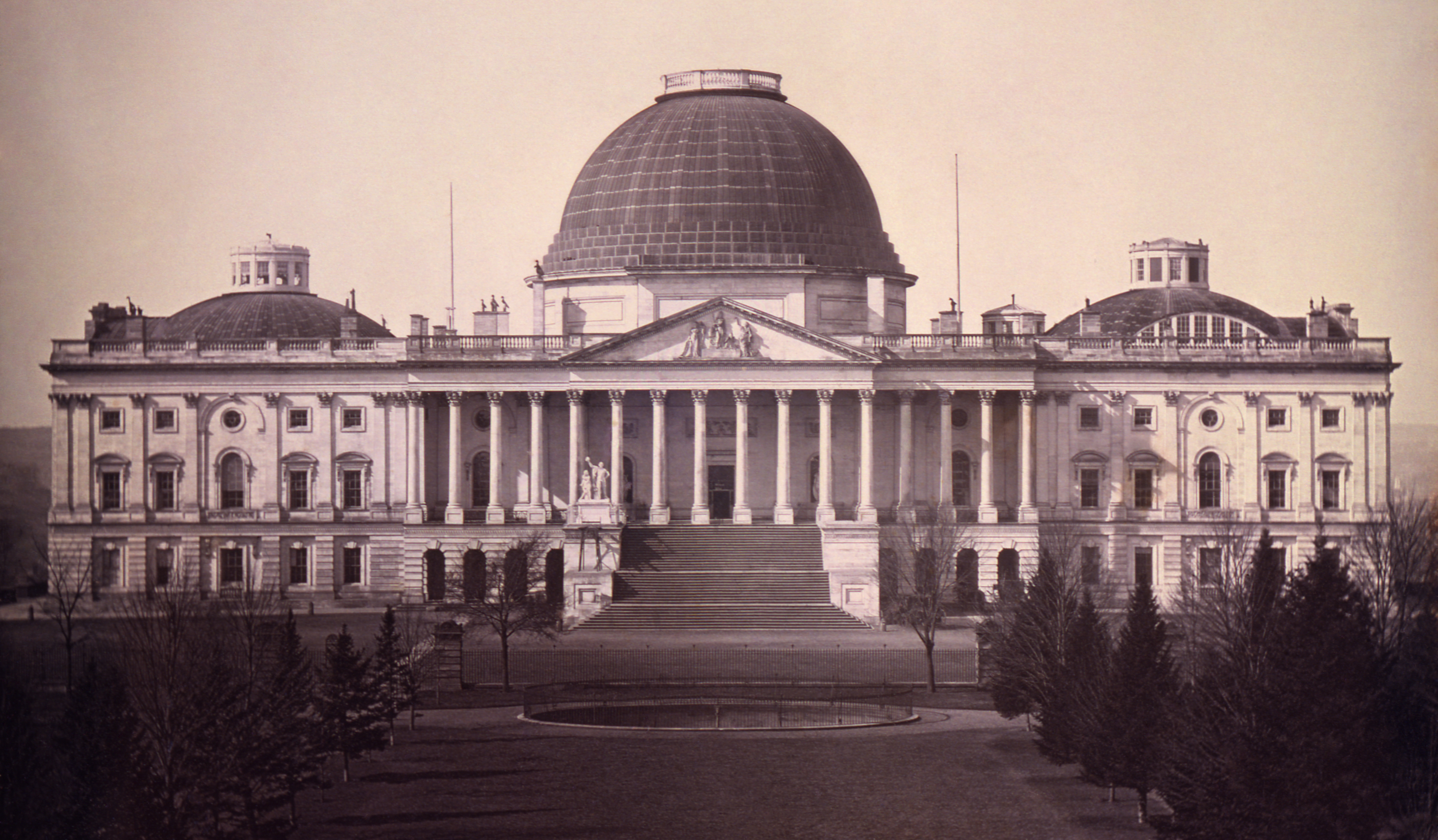
- United States Capitol (1846)

Overview
- Legislative body: United States Congress
- Jurisdiction: United States
- Term: March 4, 1849 – March 4, 1851

Senate
- Members: 62
- President: Millard Fillmore (W) (Note: U.S. Vice President Millard Fillmore's term as President of the Senate ended on July 9, 1850, when ascending to the Presidency, President pro tempore William R. King acted his duties as the President of the Senate.) (until July 9, 1850); Vacant (from July 9, 1850)
- President pro tempore: David R. Atchison (D); William R. King (D)
- Party control: Democratic

House of Representatives
- Members: 233 representatives 2 non-voting delegates
- Speaker: Howell Cobb (CU)
- Party control: Democratic (plurality)

Sessions
- Special (Note: Special session of the Senate.): March 5, 1849 – March 23, 1849
- 1st: December 3, 1849 – September 30, 1850
- 2nd: December 2, 1850 – March 4, 1851

The 31st United States Congress was a meeting of the legislative branch of the United States federal government, consisting of the United States Senate and the United States House of Representatives. It met in Washington, D.C., from March 4, 1849, to March 4, 1851, during the 16 months of the Zachary Taylor presidency and the first eight months of the administration of Millard Fillmore's. The apportionment of seats in this House of Representatives was based on the 1840 United States census. The Senate had a Democratic majority, while there was a Democratic plurality in the House.

== Major events ==
- March 4, 1849: Zachary Taylor became President of the United States
- June, 1849: Relations with France broke down as the French ambassador Guillaume-Tell de La Vallée Poussin engaged in "insulting and confrontational" behavior towards President Taylor, shortly after this a row erupted with France over reparations which France owed the United States. The president of France, Napoleon III, made this worse by making remarks that led to several members of Congress openly condemning him. (Note: A group of senators consisting of John Macpherson Berrien, William C. Dawson, Benjamin Fitzpatrick, William R. King, James M. Mason, Robert M. T. Hunter, Jesse D. Bright, James Whitcomb, Thomas Corwin, Salmon P. Chase, Joseph R. Underwood and Henry Clay, as well as a group of representatives from the House consisting of Linn Boyd, James L. Johnson, Finis E. McLean, George Caldwell, John B. Thompson, Daniel Breck, Humphrey Marshall, Charles S. Morehead, John C. Mason, Richard H. Stanton, Thomas B. King, Marshall J. Wellborn, Allen F. Owen, Hugh A. Haralson, Thomas C. Hackett, Howell Cobb, Alexander Stephens, Robert Toombs, John S. Millson, Richard K. Meade, Thomas H. Averett, Thomas S. Bocock, Paulus Powell, James Seddon, Thomas H. Bayly, Alexander Holladay, Jeremiah Morton, Richard Parker, James McDowell, Henry A. Edmundson, LaFayette McMullen, James M. H. Beale, Alexander Newman, Nathaniel Albertson, Cyrus L. Dunham, John L. Robinson, George W. Julian, William J. Brown, Willis A. Gorman, Edward W. McGaughey, Joseph E. McDonald, Graham N. Fitch, Andrew J. Harlan, David T. Disney, Lewis D. Campbell, Robert C. Schenck, Moses B. Corwin, Emery D. Potter, Jonathan D. Morris, John L. Taylor, Edson B. Olds, Charles Sweetser, John K. Miller, Samuel F. Vinton, William A. Whittlesey, Nathan Evans, William F. Hunter, Moses Hoagland, Joseph Cable, David K. Cartter, John Crowell, Joshua R. Giddings and Joseph M. Root all condemned France's President Napoleon III on the floor of the House and Senate, and put in writing that they expressed "solidarity" with President Taylor in his diplomatic clash with the French. This breakdown in relations with France was considered a potential diplomatic disaster in France, and it only calmed down when the French ambassador was removed and replaced by his own government. President Taylor refused to budge, and remained openly hostile to the French. However, Vice President Millard Fillmore was outspokenly sympathetic to the French, causing the French ambassador to remark "we have in this country (the United States) a president who hates France and Vice President who loves France. Our interests are with Fillmore." Before being removed the French ambassador wrote "With this President, this Congress and this Senate, the United States is a hostile country to us.")
- December 3–22, 1849: The election for the House speakership takes 63 ballots.
- March 7, 1850: Senator Daniel Webster gave his "Seventh of March" speech in which he endorsed the Compromise of 1850 to prevent a possible civil war
- May 22, 1850: Senate votes 42-11 in favor of ratifying the Clayton–Bulwer Treaty after the motion to do so was put forth by William R. King of Alabama. The results of the vote were celebrated in Britain.
- July 9, 1850: President Taylor died and Vice President Millard Fillmore became president.

== Major legislation ==
- September 9, 1850: Compromise of 1850, sess. 1, chs. 48-51, 9 Stat. 446 - 9 Stat. 458
- September 18, 1850: Fugitive Slave Act, sess. 1, ch. 60, 9 Stat. 462
- September 20, 1850: "An Act to suppress the Slave Trade in the District of Columbia," sess. 1, ch. 63, 9 Stat. 467
- September 29, 1850: Donation Land Claim Act, sess. 1, ch. 76, 9 Stat. 496

== States admitted and territories organized ==
- September 9, 1850 — As part of the Compromise of 1850:
  - Texas's borders were changed, ch. 49, 9 Stat. 446
  - New Mexico Territory was organized, ch. 49, 9 Stat. 448
  - California was admitted as a state, ch. 50, 9 Stat. 452
  - Utah Territory was organized, ch. 51, 9 Stat. 453

== Party summary ==
=== Senate ===
During this Congress, two Senate seats were added for the new state of California.

| | Party (shading shows control) | | | | Total | Vacant |
| | Democratic (D) | Free Soil (FS) | Whig (W) | Other | Total | Vacant |
|---|---|---|---|---|---|---|
| End of previous congress | 38 | 0 | 21 | 1 | 60 | 0 |
| Begin | 33 | 2 | 25 | 0 | 60 | 0 |
| End | 36 | 2 | 24 | 0 | 62 | 0 |
| Final voting share | 58.1% | 3.2% | 38.7% | 0.0% | | |
| Beginning of next congress | 34 | 2 | 21 | 0 | 57 | 5 |

=== House of Representatives ===
During this Congress, two House seats were added for the new state of California.

| | Party (shading shows control) | | | | | | Total | Vacant |
| | Know Nothing (A) | Democratic (D) | Free Soil (FS) | Whig (W) | Independent (I) | Other | Total | Vacant |
|---|---|---|---|---|---|---|---|---|
| End of previous congress | 1 | 111 | 0 | 114 | 1 | 2 | 229 | 1 |
| Begin | 1 | 113 | 9 | 107 | 0 | 0 | 230 | 1 |
| End | 1 | 114 | 9 | 105 | 1 | 0 | 230 | 3 |
| Final voting share | 0.4% | 49.6% | 3.9% | 45.7% | 0.4% | 0.0% | | |
| Beginning of next congress | 0 | 128 | 3 | 85 | 0 | 17 | 233 | 0 |

== Leadership ==
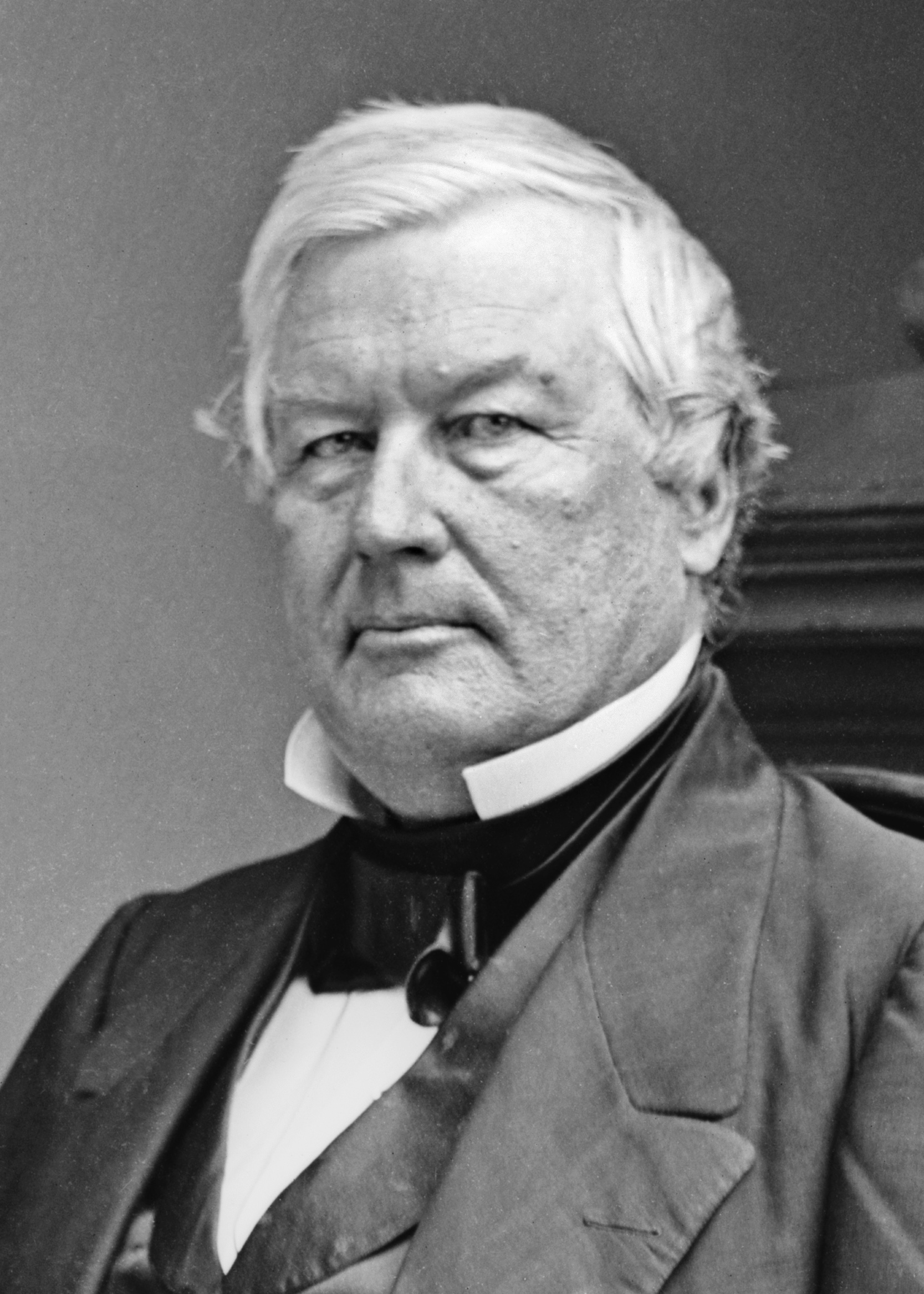
President of the Senate Millard Fillmore

=== Senate ===
- President: Millard Fillmore (W), until July 9, 1850; vacant thereafter.
- President pro tempore: David Atchison (D), until May 5, 1850
  - William R. King (D), from May 6, 1850

=== House of Representatives ===
- Speaker: Howell Cobb (D), elected December 22, 1849, after 63 ballots
- Democratic Caucus Chairman: James Thompson

== Members ==
This list is arranged by chamber, then by state. Senators are listed by class, and representatives by district.

Skip to House of Representatives, below

=== Senate ===
Senators' party membership by state at the opening of the 31st Congress in March 1849. The green stripes represent Free Soil. California's senators were not seated until September 10, 1850. 2 Democrats 1 Democrat and 1 Whig 2 Whigs

Senate presidents pro tempore

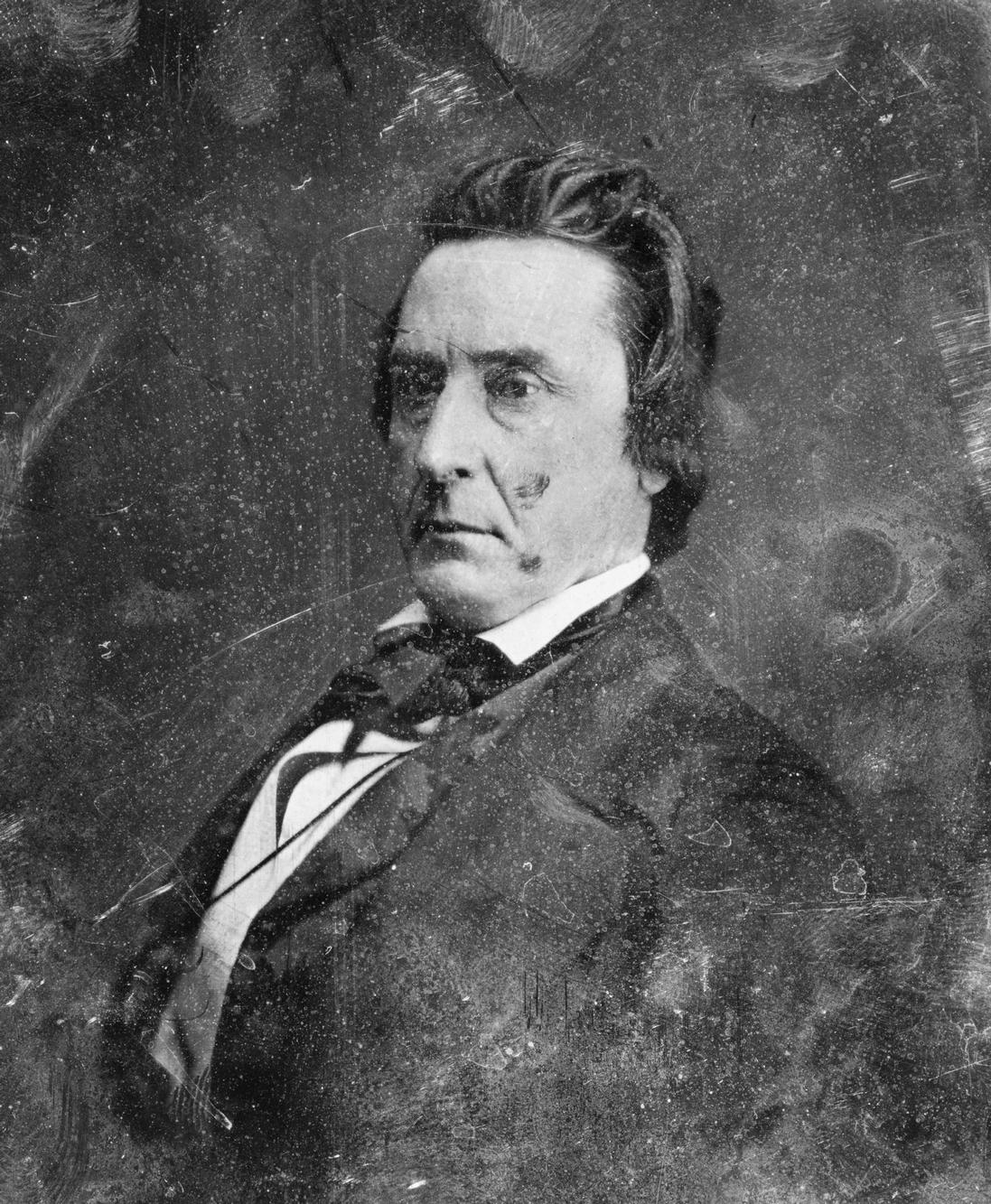
David R. Atchison (D)
(until December 2, 1849)

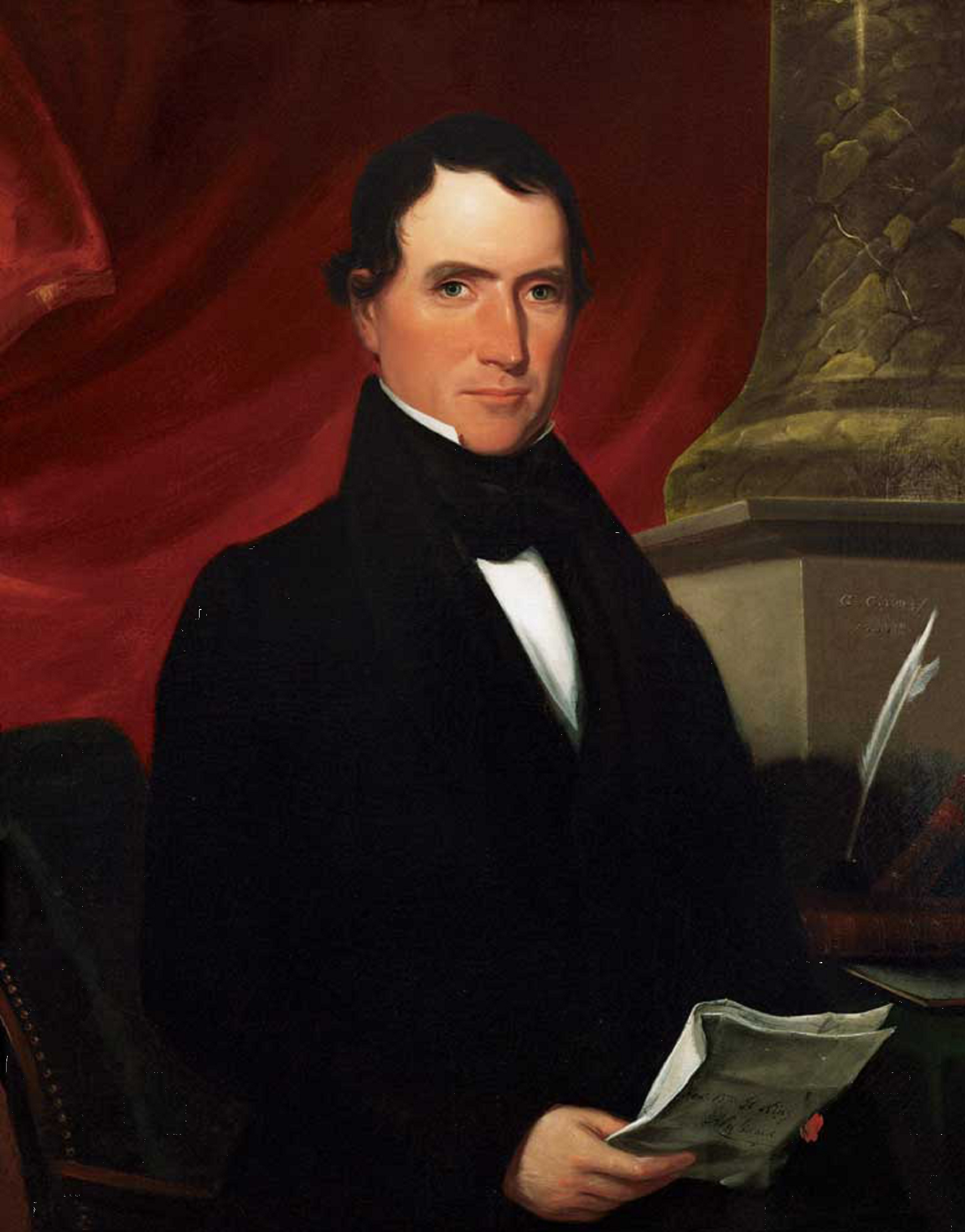
William R. King (D)
(from May 6, 1850)

Senators were elected by the state legislatures every two years, with one-third beginning new six-year terms with each Congress. Preceding the names in the list below are Senate class numbers, which indicate the cycle of their election. In this Congress, Class 1 meant their term ended with this Congress, facing re-election in 1850; Class 2 meant their term began in the last Congress, facing re-election in 1852; and Class 3 meant their term began in this Congress, facing re-election in 1854.

==== Alabama ====
▌2. Benjamin Fitzpatrick (D), until November 30, 1849

▌Jeremiah Clemens (D), from November 30, 1849

▌3. William R. King (D)

==== Arkansas ====
▌2. William K. Sebastian (D)
▌3. Solon Borland (D)

==== California ====
▌1. John C. Frémont (D), from September 10, 1850 (newly admitted state)
▌3. William M. Gwin (D), from September 10, 1850 (newly admitted state)

==== Connecticut ====
▌1. Roger S. Baldwin (W)
▌3. Truman Smith (W)

==== Delaware ====
▌1. John Wales (W)
▌2. Presley Spruance (W)

==== Florida ====
▌1. David Levy Yulee (D)
▌3. Jackson Morton (W)

==== Georgia ====
▌2. John Macpherson Berrien (W)
▌3. William C. Dawson (W)

==== Illinois ====
▌2. Stephen A. Douglas (D)
▌3. James Shields (D), until March 6, 1849

▌James Shields (D), from December 3, 1849

==== Indiana ====
▌1. Jesse D. Bright (D)
▌3. James Whitcomb (D)

==== Iowa ====
▌2. George Wallace Jones (D)
▌3. Augustus C. Dodge (D)

==== Kentucky ====
▌2. Joseph R. Underwood (W)
▌3. Henry Clay (W)

==== Louisiana ====
▌2. Solomon W. Downs (D)
▌3. Pierre Soulé (D)

==== Maine ====
▌1. Hannibal Hamlin (D)
▌2. James W. Bradbury (D)

==== Maryland ====
▌1. Reverdy Johnson (W), until March 7, 1849

▌David Stewart (W), from December 6, 1849, until January 12, 1850
▌Thomas Pratt (W), from January 12, 1850

▌3. James Pearce (W)

==== Massachusetts ====
▌1. Daniel Webster (W), until July 22, 1850

▌Robert C. Winthrop (W), from July 30, 1850, until February 1, 1851
▌Robert Rantoul Jr. (D), from February 1, 1851

▌2. John Davis (W)

==== Michigan ====
▌1. Lewis Cass (D)
▌2. Alpheus Felch (D)

==== Mississippi ====
▌1. Jefferson Davis (D)
▌2. Henry S. Foote (D)

==== Missouri ====
▌1. Thomas H. Benton (D)
▌3. David R. Atchison (D)

==== New Hampshire ====
▌2. John P. Hale (FS)
▌3. Moses Norris Jr. (D)

==== New Jersey ====
▌1. William L. Dayton (W)
▌2. Jacob W. Miller (W)

==== New York ====
▌1. Daniel S. Dickinson (D)
▌3. William H. Seward (W)

==== North Carolina ====
▌2. Willie P. Mangum (W)
▌3. George E. Badger (W)

==== Ohio ====
▌1. Thomas Corwin (W), until July 20, 1850

▌Thomas Ewing (W), from July 20, 1850

▌3. Salmon P. Chase (FS)

==== Pennsylvania ====
▌1. Daniel Sturgeon (D)
▌3. James Cooper (W)

==== Rhode Island ====
▌1. Albert C. Greene (W)
▌2. John H. Clarke (W)

==== South Carolina ====
▌2. John C. Calhoun (D), until March 31, 1850

▌Franklin H. Elmore (D), from April 11, 1850, until May 29, 1850
▌Robert W. Barnwell (D), from June 4, 1850, until December 18, 1850
▌Robert Rhett (D), from December 18, 1850

▌3. Andrew Butler (D)

==== Tennessee ====
▌1. Hopkins L. Turney (D)
▌2. John Bell (W)

==== Texas ====
▌1. Thomas J. Rusk (D)
▌2. Samuel Houston (D)

==== Vermont ====
▌1. Samuel S. Phelps (W)
▌3. William Upham (W)

==== Virginia ====
▌1. James M. Mason (D)
▌2. Robert M. T. Hunter (D)

==== Wisconsin ====
▌1. Henry Dodge (D)
▌3. Isaac P. Walker (D)

=== House of Representatives ===
The names of representatives are preceded by their district numbers.

==== Alabama ====
▌1. William J. Alston (W)
▌2. Henry W. Hilliard (W)
▌3. Sampson W. Harris (D)
▌4. Samuel W. Inge (D)
▌5. David Hubbard (D)
▌6. Williamson R. W. Cobb (D)
▌7. Franklin W. Bowdon (D)

==== Arkansas ====
▌At-large. Robert W. Johnson (D)

==== California ====
Both representatives were elected statewide on a general ticket.

▌At-large. Edward Gilbert (D), from September 11, 1850 (newly admitted state)
▌At-large. George W. Wright (I), from September 11, 1850 (newly admitted state)

==== Connecticut ====
▌1. Loren P. Waldo (D)
▌2. Walter Booth (FS)
▌3. Chauncey F. Cleveland (D)
▌4. Thomas B. Butler (W)

==== Delaware ====
▌At-large. John W. Houston (W)

==== Florida ====
▌At-large. Edward C. Cabell (W)

==== Georgia ====
▌1. Thomas Butler King (W), until March 3, 1850

▌Joseph W. Jackson (D), from March 4, 1850

▌2. Marshall J. Wellborn (D)
▌3. Allen F. Owen (W)
▌4. Hugh A. Haralson (D)
▌5. Thomas C. Hackett (D)
▌6. Howell Cobb (D)
▌7. Alexander H. Stephens (W)
▌8. Robert A. Toombs (W)

==== Illinois ====
▌1. William H. Bissell (D)
▌2. John A. McClernand (D)
▌3. Timothy R. Young (D)
▌4. John Wentworth (D)
▌5. William A. Richardson (D)
▌6. Edward D. Baker (W)
▌7. Thomas L. Harris (D)

==== Indiana ====
▌1. Nathaniel Albertson (D)
▌2. Cyrus L. Dunham (D)
▌3. John L. Robinson (D)
▌4. George W. Julian (FS)
▌5. William J. Brown (D)
▌6. Willis A. Gorman (D)
▌7. Edward W. McGaughey (W)
▌8. Joseph E. McDonald (D)
▌9. Graham N. Fitch (D)
▌10. Andrew J. Harlan (D)

==== Iowa ====
▌1. William Thompson (D), until June 29, 1850

▌Daniel F. Miller (W), from December 20, 1850

▌2. Shepherd Leffler (D)

==== Kentucky ====
▌1. Linn Boyd (D)
▌2. James L. Johnson (W)
▌3. Finis E. McLean (W)
▌4. George Caldwell (D)
▌5. John B. Thompson (W)
▌6. Daniel Breck (W)
▌7. Humphrey Marshall (W)
▌8. Charles S. Morehead (W)
▌9. John C. Mason (D)
▌10. Richard H. Stanton (D)

==== Louisiana ====
▌1. Emile La Sére (D)
▌2. Charles M. Conrad (W), until August 17, 1850

▌Henry A. Bullard (W), from December 5, 1850

▌3. John H. Harmanson (D), until October 24, 1850

▌Alexander G. Penn (D), from December 30, 1850

▌4. Isaac E. Morse (D)

==== Maine ====
▌1. Elbridge Gerry (D)
▌2. Nathaniel Littlefield (D)
▌3. John Otis (W)
▌4. Rufus K. Goodenow (W)
▌5. Cullen Sawtelle (D)
▌6. Charles Stetson (D)
▌7. Thomas J. D. Fuller (D)

==== Maryland ====
▌1. Richard Bowie (W)
▌2. William T. Hamilton (D)
▌3. Edward Hammond (D)
▌4. Robert M. McLane (D)
▌5. Alexander Evans (W)
▌6. John B. Kerr (W)

==== Massachusetts ====
▌1. Robert C. Winthrop (W), until July 30, 1850

▌Samuel Atkins Eliot (W), from August 22, 1850

▌2. Daniel P. King (W), until July 25, 1850
▌3. James H. Duncan (W)
4. vacant
▌5. Charles Allen (FS)
▌6. George Ashmun (W)
▌7. Julius Rockwell (W)
▌8. Horace Mann (W)
▌9. Orin Fowler (W)
▌10. Joseph Grinnell (W)

==== Michigan ====
▌1. Alexander W. Buel (D)
▌2. William Sprague (W)
▌3. Kinsley S. Bingham (D)

==== Mississippi ====
▌1. Jacob Thompson (D)
▌2. Winfield S. Featherston (D)
▌3. William McWillie (D)
▌4. Albert G. Brown (D)

==== Missouri ====
▌1. James B. Bowlin (D)
▌2. William V. Bay (D)
▌3. James S. Green (D)
▌4. Willard P. Hall (D)
▌5. John S. Phelps (D)

==== New Hampshire ====
▌1. Amos Tuck (FS)
▌2. Charles H. Peaslee (D)
▌3. James Wilson (W), until September 9, 1850

▌George W. Morrison (D), from October 8, 1850

▌4. Harry Hibbard (D)

==== New Jersey ====
▌1. Andrew K. Hay (W)
▌2. William A. Newell (W)
▌3. Isaac Wildrick (D)
▌4. John Van Dyke (W)
▌5. James G. King (W)

==== New York ====
▌1. John A. King (W)
▌2. David A. Bokee (W)
▌3. J. Phillips Phoenix (W)
▌4. Walter Underhill (W)
▌5. George Briggs (W)
▌6. James Brooks (W)
▌7. William Nelson (W)
▌8. Ransom Halloway (W)
▌9. Thomas McKissock (W)
▌10. Herman D. Gould (W)
▌11. Peter H. Silvester (W)
▌12. Gideon Reynolds (W)
▌13. John L. Schoolcraft (W)
▌14. George R. Andrews (W)
▌15. John R. Thurman (W)
▌16. Hugh White (W)
▌17. Henry P. Alexander (W)
▌18. Preston King (FS)
▌19. Charles E. Clarke (W)
▌20. Orsamus B. Matteson (W)
▌21. Hiram Walden (D)
▌22. Henry Bennett (W)
▌23. William Duer (W)
▌24. Daniel Gott (W)
▌25. Harmon S. Conger (W)
▌26. William T. Jackson (W)
▌27. William A. Sackett (W)
▌28. Abraham M. Schermerhorn (W)
▌29. Robert L. Rose (W)
▌30. David Rumsey Jr. (W)
▌31. Elijah Risley (W)
▌32. Elbridge G. Spaulding (W)
▌33. Harvey Putnam (W)
▌34. Lorenzo Burrows (W)

==== North Carolina ====
▌1. Thomas L. Clingman (W)
▌2. Joseph P. Caldwell (W)
▌3. Edmund Deberry (W)
▌4. Augustine H. Shepperd (W)
▌5. Abraham W. Venable (D)
▌6. John R. J. Daniel (D)
▌7. William S. Ashe (D)
▌8. Edward Stanly (W)
▌9. David Outlaw (W)

==== Ohio ====
▌1. David T. Disney (D)
▌2. Lewis D. Campbell (W)
▌3. Robert C. Schenck (W)
▌4. Moses B. Corwin (W)
▌5. Emery D. Potter (D)
▌6. Rodolphus Dickinson (D), until March 20, 1849

▌Amos E. Wood (D), from December 3, 1849, until November 19, 1850
▌John Bell (W), from January 7, 1851

▌7. Jonathan D. Morris (D)
▌8. John L. Taylor (W)
▌9. Edson B. Olds (D)
▌10. Charles Sweetser (D)
▌11. John K. Miller (D)
▌12. Samuel F. Vinton (W)
▌13. William A. Whittlesey (D)
▌14. Nathan Evans (W)
▌15. William F. Hunter (W)
▌16. Moses Hoagland (D)
▌17. Joseph Cable (D)
▌18. David K. Cartter (D)
▌19. John Crowell (W)
▌20. Joshua R. Giddings (FS)
▌21. Joseph M. Root (FS)

==== Pennsylvania ====
▌1. Lewis C. Levin (A)
▌2. Joseph R. Chandler (W)
▌3. Henry D. Moore (W)
▌4. John Robbins Jr. (D)
▌5. John Freedley (W)
▌6. Thomas Ross (D)
▌7. Jesse C. Dickey (W)
▌8. Thaddeus Stevens (W)
▌9. William Strong (D)
▌10. Milo M. Dimmick (D)
▌11. Chester P. Butler (W), until October 5, 1850

▌John Brisbin (D), from November 13, 1850

▌12. David Wilmot (D)
▌13. Joseph Casey (W)
▌14. Charles W. Pitman (W)
▌15. Henry Nes (W), until September 10, 1850

▌Joel B. Danner (D), from December 2, 1850

▌16. James X. McLanahan (D)
▌17. Samuel Calvin (W)
▌18. Andrew J. Ogle (W)
▌19. Job Mann (D)
▌20. Robert R. Reed (W)
▌21. Moses Hampton (W)
▌22. John W. Howe (FS)
▌23. James Thompson (D)
▌24. Alfred Gilmore (D)

==== Rhode Island ====
▌1. George G. King (W)
▌2. Nathan F. Dixon Jr. (W)

==== South Carolina ====
▌1. Daniel Wallace (D)
▌2. James L. Orr (D)
▌3. Joseph A. Woodward (D)
▌4. John McQueen (D)
▌5. Armistead Burt (D)
▌6. Isaac E. Holmes (D)
▌7. William F. Colcock (D)

==== Tennessee ====
▌1. Andrew Johnson (D)
▌2. Albert G. Watkins (W)
▌3. Josiah M. Anderson (W)
▌4. John H. Savage (D)
▌5. George W. Jones (D)
▌6. James H. Thomas (D)
▌7. Meredith P. Gentry (W)
▌8. Andrew Ewing (D)
▌9. Isham G. Harris (D)
▌10. Frederick P. Stanton (D)
▌11. Christopher H. Williams (W)

==== Texas ====
▌1. David S. Kaufman (D), until January 31, 1851
▌2. Volney E. Howard (D)

==== Vermont ====
▌1. William Henry (W)
▌2. William Hebard (W)
▌3. George P. Marsh (W), until May 29, 1849

▌James Meacham (W), from December 3, 1849

▌4. Lucius B. Peck (D)

==== Virginia ====
▌1. John S. Millson (D)
▌2. Richard K. Meade (D)
▌3. Thomas H. Averett (D)
▌4. Thomas S. Bocock (D)
▌5. Paulus Powell (D)
▌6. James A. Seddon (D)
▌7. Thomas H. Bayly (D)
▌8. Alexander Holladay (D)
▌9. Jeremiah Morton (W)
▌10. Richard Parker (D)
▌11. James McDowell (D)
▌12. Henry A. Edmundson (D)
▌13. LaFayette McMullen (D)
▌14. James M. H. Beale (D)
▌15. Alexander Newman (D), until September 8, 1849

▌Thomas Haymond (W), from November 8, 1849

==== Wisconsin ====
▌1. Charles Durkee (FS)
▌2. Orasmus Cole (W)
▌3. James D. Doty (D)

==== Non-voting members ====
Minnesota Territory. Henry H. Sibley, from July 7, 1849
▌Oregon Territory. Samuel Thurston (D)

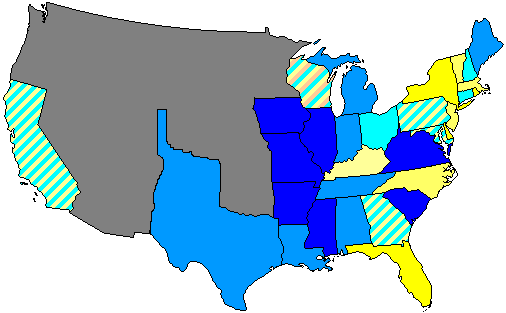
House seats by party holding plurality in state: 80+% to 100% Democratic / Up to 60% Whig; 60+% to 80% Democratic / 60+% to 80% Whig; Up to 60% Democratic / 80+% to 100% Whig; 33% Free Soil Party

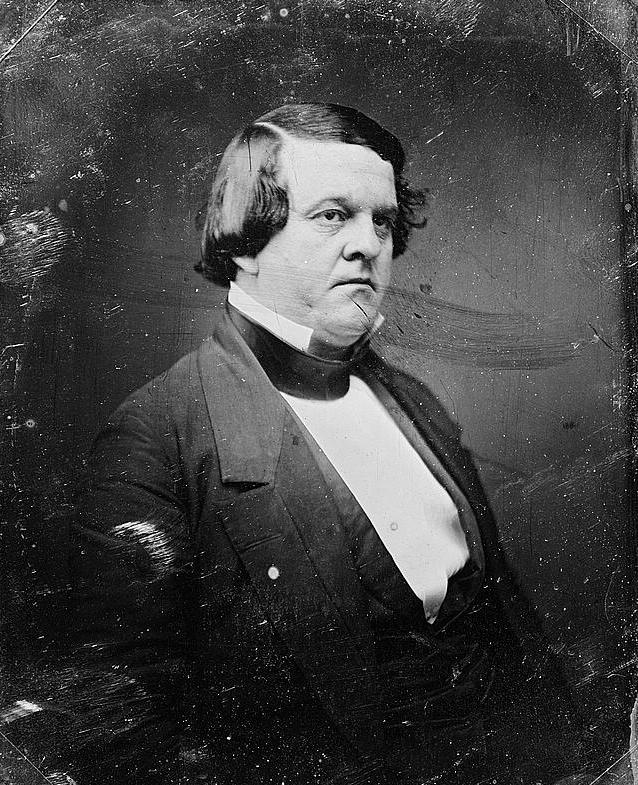
Speaker Howell Cobb

== Changes in membership ==
The count below reflects changes from the beginning of the first session of this Congress.

=== Senate ===
- Replacements: 5
  - Democrats (D): no net change
  - Whigs (W): no net change
- Deaths: 1
- Resignations: 3
- Seats from newly admitted states: 2
- Interim appointments: 4
- Total seats with changes: 8

Senate changes
| State (class) | Vacated by | Reason for change | Successor | Date of successor's formal installation (Note: When seated or oath administered, not necessarily when service began.) |
|---|---|---|---|---|
| Illinois (3) | James Shields (D) | Senate voided election March 6, 1849, as Sen. Shields was determined not to have been a US citizen for the number of years required by the Constitution. Incumbent was re-elected October 27, 1849, having by then qualified. | James Shields (D) | Seated December 3, 1849 |
| Maryland (1) | Reverdy Johnson (W) | Resigned March 7, 1849, having been appointed United States Attorney General | David Stewart (W) | Appointed December 6, 1849 |
| Alabama (2) | Benjamin Fitzpatrick (D) | Sen. Dixon Lewis successor elected November 30, 1849 | Jeremiah Clemens (D) | Elected November 30, 1849 |
| Maryland (1) | David Stewart (W) | Successor elected January 12, 1850 | Thomas Pratt (W) | Elected January 12, 1850 |
| South Carolina (2) | John C. Calhoun (D) | Died March 31, 1850 | Franklin H. Elmore (D) | Appointed April 11, 1850 |
| South Carolina (2) | Franklin H. Elmore (D) | Died May 29, 1850 | Robert W. Barnwell (D) | Appointed June 4, 1850 |
| Ohio (1) | Thomas Corwin (W) | Resigned July 20, 1850, after being appointed United States Secretary of the Treasury | Thomas Ewing (W) | Appointed July 20, 1850 |
| Massachusetts (1) | Daniel Webster (W) | Resigned July 22, 1850, after being appointed United States Secretary of State again. | Robert C. Winthrop (W) | Appointed July 30, 1850 |
| California (1) | New state | California admitted to the Union September 9, 1850. The first Senator was elected September 10, 1850. | John C. Frémont (D) | Elected September 10, 1850 |
| California (3) | New state | California admitted to the Union September 9, 1850. The first Senator was elected September 10, 1850. | William M. Gwin (D) | Elected September 10, 1850 |
| South Carolina (2) | Robert W. Barnwell (D) | Successor elected December 18, 1850 | Robert Rhett (D) | Elected December 18, 1850 |
| Massachusetts (1) | Robert C. Winthrop (W) | Successor elected February 1, 1851 | Robert Rantoul Jr. (D) | Elected February 1, 1851 |

=== House of Representatives ===
- Replacements: 11
  - Democrats (D): 2 seat net gain
  - Whigs (W): 2 seat net loss
- Deaths: 8
- Resignations: 5
- Contested election:1
- Seats from newly admitted states: 2
- Total seats with changes: 16

House changes
| District | Vacated by | Reason for change | Successor | Date of successor's formal installation |
|---|---|---|---|---|
| Minnesota Territory At-large | Vacant | Seat remained vacant after territory became organized at end of previous congress | Henry H. Sibley | Seated July 7, 1849 |
| Vermont 3rd | George Perkins Marsh (W) | Resigned some time in 1849 | James Meacham (W) | Seated December 3, 1849 |
| Ohio 6th | Rodolphus Dickinson (D) | Died March 20, 1849 | Amos E. Wood (D) | Seated December 3, 1849 |
| Virginia 15th | Alexander Newman (D) | Died September 8, 1849 | Thomas Haymond (W) | Seated November 8, 1849 |
| Georgia 1st | Thomas B. King (W) | Resigned March 3, 1850 | Joseph W. Jackson (D) | Seated March 4, 1850 |
| Massachusetts 2nd | Daniel P. King (W) | Died July 25, 1850 | Vacant | Not filled this term |
| Iowa 1st | William Thompson (D) | Seat declared vacant June 29, 1850, after contested election. House ruled neither candidate entitled to seat and forced special election | Daniel F. Miller (W) | Seated December 20, 1850 |
| Massachusetts 1st | Robert C. Winthrop (W) | Resigned July 30, 1850, after being appointed to the US Senate | Samuel A. Eliot (W) | Seated August 22, 1850 |
| Louisiana 2nd | Charles M. Conrad (W) | Resigned August 17, 1850, after being appointed United States Secretary of War | Henry A. Bullard (W) | Seated December 5, 1850 |
| New Hampshire 3rd | James Wilson (W) | Resigned September 9, 1850 | George W. Morrison (D) | Seated October 8, 1850 |
| California At-large | California admitted into the Union September 9, 1850, and seat remained vacant until September 11, 1850 | | Edward Gilbert (D) | Seated September 11, 1850 |
| California At-large | California admitted into the Union September 9, 1850, and seat remained vacant until September 11, 1850 | | George W. Wright (I) | Seated September 11, 1850 |
| Pennsylvania 15th | Henry Nes (W) | Died September 10, 1850 | Joel B. Danner (D) | Seated December 2, 1850 |
| Pennsylvania 11th | Chester P. Butler (W) | Died October 5, 1850 | John Brisbin (D) | Seated November 13, 1850 |
| Louisiana 3rd | John H. Harmanson (D) | Died October 24, 1850 | Alexander G. Penn (D) | Seated December 30, 1850 |
| Ohio 6th | Amos E. Wood (D) | Died November 19, 1850 | John Bell (W) | Seated January 7, 1851 |
| Texas 1st | David S. Kaufman (D) | Died January 31, 1851 | Vacant | Not filled this term |

== Committees ==
Lists of committees and their party leaders.

=== Senate ===
- Agriculture (Chairman: Daniel Sturgeon)
- Audit and Control the Contingent Expenses of the Senate (Chairman: Augustus Dodge)
- California's Admission to the Union (Select)
- Claims (Chairman: Moses Norris Jr.)
- Commerce (Chairman: Clement C. Clay)
- Disorder in the Senate of April 17, 1850 (Select)
- Distributing Public Revenue Among the States (Select)
- District of Columbia (Chairman: James M. Mason)
- Eligibility of James Shields (Special)
- Finance (Chairman: Daniel S. Dickinson then James Pearce)
- Foreign Relations (Chairman: William R. King then Henry S. Foote)
- French Spoilations (Select) (Chairman: Truman Smith)
- Indian Affairs (Chairman: David R. Atchison)
- Judiciary (Chairman: Andrew P. Butler)
- Manufactures (Chairman: William K. Sebastian)
- Mexican Boundary Commission (Select)
- Military Affairs (Chairman: Jefferson Davis)
- Militia (Chairman: Sam Houston)
- Naval Affairs (Chairman: David Levy Yulee)
- Ordnance and War Ships (Select)
- Patents and the Patent Office (Chairman: David S. Reid)
- Pensions (Chairman: George Wallace Jones)
- Post Office and Post Roads (Chairman: Thomas J. Rusk)
- Printing (Chairman: Solon Borland)
- Private Land Claims (Chairman: Solomon W. Downs)
- Public Buildings and Grounds (Chairman: Robert M.T. Hunter)
- Public Lands (Chairman: Alpheus Felch)
- Retrenchment (Chairman: James W. Bradbury)
- Revolutionary Claims (Chairman: Isaac P. Walker)
- Roads and Canals (Chairman: Jesse D. Bright)
- Seventh Census (Select)
- Settlement of the Slavery Question (Select)
- Tariff Regulation (Select)
- Territories (Chairman: Stephen A. Douglas)
- Whole

=== House of Representatives ===
- Accounts (Chairman: Daniel P. King)
- Agriculture (Chairman: Nathaniel S. Littlefield)
- Bounty Land Act of 1850 (Select)
- Claims (Chairman: John Reeves Jones Daniel)
- Commerce (Chairman: Robert M. McLane)
- District of Columbia (Chairman: Albert G. Brown)
- Elections (Chairman: William Strong)
- Engraving (Chairman: Edward Hammond)
- Expenditures in the Navy Department (Chairman: Alexander Holladay)
- Expenditures in the Post Office Department (Chairman: William Thompson)
- Expenditures in the State Department (Chairman: Kingsley S. Bingham)
- Expenditures in the Treasury Department (Chairman: George A. Caldwell)
- Expenditures in the War Department (Chairman: Milo M. Dimmick)
- Expenditures on Public Buildings (Chairman: James M. H. Beale)
- Foreign Affairs (Chairman: John A. McClernand)
- Indian Affairs (Chairman: Robert W. Johnson)
- Invalid Pensions (Chairman: Shepherd Leffler)
- Judiciary (Chairman: James Thompson)
- Manufactures (Chairman: Lucius B. Peck)
- Mileage (Chairman: Graham N. Fitch)
- Military Affairs (Chairman: Armistead Burt)
- Militia (Chairman: Charles H. Peaslee)
- Naval Affairs (Chairman: Frederick P. Stanton)
- Patents (Chairman: Hiram Walden)
- Post Office and Post Roads (Chairman: Emery D. Potter)
- Private Land Claims (Chairman: Isaac E. Morse)
- Public Buildings and Grounds (Chairman: Franklin W. Bowdon)
- Public Expenditures (Chairman: Andrew Johnson)
- Public Lands (Chairman: James B. Bowlin)
- Revisal and Unfinished Business (Chairman: Williamson R. W. Cobb)
- Revolutionary Claims (Chairman: Cullen Sawtelle)
- Revolutionary Pensions (Chairman: Loren P. Waldo)
- Roads and Canals (Chairman: John L. Robinson)
- Rules (Chairman: David S. Kaufman)
- Standards of Official Conduct
- Territories (Chairman: Linn Boyd)
- Ways and Means (Chairman: Thomas H. Bayly)
- Whole

=== Joint committees ===
- Enrolled Bills (Chairman: Sen. Thomas J. Rusk then Sen. George Badger)
- The Library (Chairman: N/A)
- The Printing (Chairman: N/A)

== Caucuses ==
- Democratic (House)
- Democratic (Senate)

== Employees ==
- Librarian of Congress: John Silva Meehan

=== Senate ===
- Chaplain: Henry Slicer (Methodist), until January 9, 1850
  - Clement M. Butler (Episcopalian), elected January 9, 1850
- Secretary: Asbury Dickins
- Sergeant at Arms: Robert Beale

=== House of Representatives ===
- Chaplain: Ralph Gurley (Presbyterian)
- Clerk: Thomas J. Campbell, died April 13, 1850
  - Richard M. Young, elected April 17, 1850
- Doorkeeper: Robert E. Horner
- Postmaster: John M. Johnson
- Sergeant at Arms: Nathan Sargent, until January 15, 1850
  - Adam J. Glossbrenner, from January 15, 1850

== See also ==
- 1848 United States elections (elections leading to this Congress)
  - 1848 United States presidential election
  - 1848–49 United States Senate elections
  - 1848–49 United States House of Representatives elections
- 1850 United States elections (elections during this Congress, leading to the next Congress)
  - 1850–51 United States Senate elections
  - 1850–51 United States House of Representatives elections
