= Alexander G. Penn =

American politician (1799–1866)

Member of the U.S. House of Representatives from Louisiana's 2nd district
- In office December 30, 1850 – March 3, 1853
- Preceded by: John Henry Harmanson
- Succeeded by: John Perkins Jr.

Member of the Louisiana House of Representatives

Postmaster of New Orleans
- In office December 19, 1843 – April 18, 1849

Personal details
- Born: Alexander Gordon Penn; May 10, 1799 Near Stella, Virginia, U.S.
- Died: May 7, 1866 (aged 66) Washington, D.C., U.S.
- Resting place: Glenwood Cemetery, Washington, D.C.
- Party: Democratic
- Education: Emory and Henry College
- Profession: Planter, Lumber Mill Operator, Politician

Alexander Gordon Penn (May 10, 1799 – May 7, 1866) was a 19th-century American politician who served two terms as a U.S. representative from Louisiana from 1850 to 1853.

== Biography ==
Born near Stella, Virginia, Penn moved with his parents to Lexington, Kentucky; he then completed preparatory studies and attended Emory and Henry College, Marion, Virginia. Later he moved to the parish of St. Tammany, Louisiana, in 1821 and engaged in planting near Covington. He served in the State house of representatives. Postmaster of New Orleans from December 19, 1843, to April 18, 1849. He served as delegate to the Democratic National Conventions in 1844, 1852, 1856, and 1860.

=== Congress ===
Penn was elected as a Democrat to the Thirty-first Congress to fill the vacancy caused by the death of John H. Harmanson. He was reelected to the Thirty-second Congress and served from December 30, 1850, to March 3, 1853. He served as chairman of the Committee on Expenditures in the Post Office Department (Thirty-second Congress).

He returned to St. Tammany Parish and engaged in planting and the operation of a lumber mill near Covington.

=== Death and burial ===
At the conclusion of the Civil War, Penn returned to Washington, D.C. He died there on May 7, 1866, and was interred in Glenwood Cemetery.

== Bibliography ==
- Bailey, N. Louise; Morgan, Mary L.; Taylor, Carolyn R. (1986). Biographical Directory of the South Carolina Senate: 1776-1985. Volume 1. Columbia, S.C.: University of South Carolina Press. ISBN 0872494799.
- United States Congress. "Alexander G. Penn (id: P000210)". Biographical Directory of the United States Congress.

U.S. House of Representatives
Preceded by John Henry Harmanson	Member of the U.S. House of Representatives from Louisiana's 2nd congressional district 1850 – 1853	Succeeded by John Perkins Jr.
