= John H. Harmanson =

American politician

Member of the United States House of Representatives from Louisiana's 3rd district
- In office December 1, 1845 – October 24, 1850
- Preceded by: John Bennett Dawson
- Succeeded by: Alexander Gordon Penn

Member of the Louisiana State Senate

Personal details
- Born: John Henry Harmanson; January 15, 1803 Norfolk, Virginia, U.S.
- Died: October 24, 1850 (aged 47) New Orleans, Louisiana, U.S.
- Resting place: Moreau Plantation Cemetery, Pointe Coupee Parish, Louisiana
- Party: Democratic
- Education: Jefferson College (Mississippi)
- Occupation: Politician, Lawyer

John Henry Harmanson (January 15, 1803 – October 24, 1850) was a U.S. representative from Louisiana.

== Biography ==
Born in Norfolk, Virginia, Harmanson pursued classical studies. He graduated from Jefferson College, Washington, Mississippi. He moved to Avoyelles Parish, Louisiana, in 1830 and engaged in agricultural pursuits. He studied law. He was admitted to the bar and practiced. He served as member of the State senate in 1844.

=== Congress ===
Harmanson won an 1845 special election as a Democrat and was reelected twice. He served in the Twenty-ninth, Thirtieth, and Thirty-first Congresses, December 1, 1845, until his death in New Orleans, Louisiana, October 24, 1850. He served as chairman of the Committee on Expenditures in the Post Office Department (Twenty-ninth Congress).

=== Death and burial ===
He died on October 24, 1850, and was interred in Moreau Plantation Cemetery, Pointe Coupee Parish, Louisiana.

== See also ==
- List of members of the United States Congress who died in office (1790–1899)

U.S. House of Representatives
Preceded by John Bennett Dawson	Member of the U.S. House of Representatives from Louisiana's 3rd congressional district 1845 – 1850	Succeeded by Alexander Gordon Penn
