= 1850–51 United States Senate elections =

- Various dates
- Class 1

21 of the 62 seats in the United States Senate (with special elections) 32 seats needed for a majority
	Majority party	Minority party	Third party
Party	Democratic	Whig	Free Soil
Last election	33 seats	25 seats	1 seat
Seats before	35	25	2
Seats won	12	4	0
Seats after	33	22	2
Seat change	▼2	▼3	Steady
Seats up	14	7	0
- Results: Democratic gain Democratic hold Whig gain Whig hold Legislature failed to elect
Majority party before election
Democratic
Elected Majority party
Democratic

The 1850–51 United States Senate elections were held on various dates in various states. As these U.S. Senate elections were prior to the ratification of the Seventeenth Amendment in 1913, senators were chosen by state legislatures. Senators were elected over a wide range of time throughout 1850 and 1851, and a seat may have been filled months late or remained vacant due to legislative deadlock. In these elections, terms were up for the senators in Class 1.

The Democratic Party lost seats, but retained a majority in the Senate. This was the last election until 2006 that the Class 1 Vermont seat voted for a non-Republican.

== Results summary ==
Senate party division, 32nd Congress (1851–1853)

- Majority party: Democratic (34–35)
- Minority party: Whig Party (21–23)
- Other parties: Free Soiler (2–3)
- Total seats: 62

== Change in composition ==
=== Before the elections ===
D_{1}									
D_{2}	D_{3}	D_{4}	D_{5}	D_{6}	D_{7}	D_{8}	D_{9}	D_{10}	D_{11}
D_{21}	D_{20}	D_{19}	D_{18}	D_{17}	D_{16}	D_{15}	D_{14}	D_{13}	D_{12}
D_{22}	D_{23} Ran	D_{24} Ran	D_{25} Ran	D_{26} Ran	D_{27} Ran	D_{28} Ran	D_{29} Ran	D_{30} Ran	D_{31} Ran
Majority →									D_{32} Ran
W_{22} Unknown	W_{23} Unknown	W_{24} Retired	FS_{1}	FS_{2}	D_{36} Retired	D_{35} Unknown	D_{34} Unknown	D_{33} Ran	D_{32} Ran
W_{21} Ran	W_{20} Ran	W_{19} Ran	W_{18} Ran	W_{17}	W_{16}	W_{15}	W_{14}	W_{13}	W_{12}
W_{2}	W_{3}	W_{4}	W_{5}	W_{6}	W_{7}	W_{8}	W_{9}	W_{10}	W_{11}
W_{1}									

=== As a result of the elections ===
D_{1}									
D_{2}	D_{3}	D_{4}	D_{5}	D_{6}	D_{7}	D_{8}	D_{9}	D_{10}	D_{11}
D_{21}	D_{20}	D_{19}	D_{18}	D_{17}	D_{16}	D_{15}	D_{14}	D_{13}	D_{12}
D_{22}	D_{23} Re-elected	D_{24} Re-elected	D_{25} Re-elected	D_{26} Re-elected	D_{27} Re-elected	D_{28} Re-elected	D_{29} Re-elected	D_{30} Hold	D_{31} Hold
Majority →									D_{32} Gain
V_{1} W Loss	V_{2} W Loss	FS_{1}	FS_{2}	V_{3} D Loss	V_{4} D Loss	V_{5} D Loss	D_{34} Gain	D_{33} Gain	D_{32} Gain
W_{21} Gain	W_{20} Gain	W_{19} Hold	W_{18} Re-elected	W_{17}	W_{16}	W_{15}	W_{14}	W_{13}	W_{12}
W_{2}	W_{3}	W_{4}	W_{5}	W_{6}	W_{7}	W_{8}	W_{9}	W_{10}	W_{11}
W_{1}									

=== At the beginning of the first session, December 1, 1851 ===
D_{1}									
D_{2}	D_{3}	D_{4}	D_{5}	D_{6}	D_{7}	D_{8}	D_{9}	D_{10}	D_{11}
D_{21}	D_{20}	D_{19}	D_{18}	D_{17}	D_{16}	D_{15}	D_{14}	D_{13}	D_{12}
D_{22}	D_{23}	D_{24}	D_{25}	D_{26}	D_{27}	D_{28}	D_{29}	D_{30}	D_{31}
Majority →									D_{32}
W_{22} Gain	W_{23} Gain	FS_{1}	FS_{2}	FS_{3} Gain	V_{1}	V_{2}	D_{34} Hold	D_{33}	D_{32}
W_{21}	W_{20}	W_{19}	W_{18}	W_{17}	W_{16}	W_{15}	W_{14}	W_{13}	W_{12}
W_{2}	W_{3}	W_{4}	W_{5}	W_{6}	W_{7}	W_{8}	W_{9}	W_{10}	W_{11}
W_{1}									

Key:

D_{#}	Democratic
FS_{#}	Free Soil
W_{#}	Whig
V_{#}	Vacant

== Race summaries ==
=== Elections during the 31st Congress ===
In these elections, the winners were seated during 1850 or in 1851 before March 4; ordered by election date.

State	Incumbent			Results	Candidates
State	Senator	Party	Electoral history	Results	Candidates
Maryland (Class 1)	David Stewart	Whig	1849 (appointed)	Interim appointee retired. New senator elected January 12, 1850. Whig hold. Winner was elected to the next term; see below.	▌ ✓ Thomas Pratt (Whig) 57 votes; ▌David Stewart (Democratic) 38 votes; Blank 2 votes
Massachusetts (Class 1)	Robert C. Winthrop	Whig	1850 (appointed)	Interim appointee lost election to finish the term. New senator elected February 1, 1851. Democratic gain. Winner was not elected to the next term; see below.	▌ ✓ Robert Rantoul Jr. (Democratic); ▌Robert C. Winthrop (Whig); [data missing]

=== Races leading to the 32nd Congress ===
In these regular elections, the winners were elected for the term beginning March 4, 1851; ordered by state.

All of the elections involved the Class 1 seats.

State	Incumbent			Results	Candidates
State	Senator	Party	Electoral history	Results	Candidates
Connecticut	Roger Sherman Baldwin	Whig	1847 (appointed); 1848 (special)	Incumbent lost re-election or retired. Legislature failed to elect. Whig loss. Seat would not be filled until 1852.	[data missing]
California	John C. Frémont	Democratic	1850	Incumbent lost re-election. Legislature failed to elect. Democratic loss. Seat would not be filled until 1852.	▌John C. Frémont (Democratic) [data missing]
Delaware	John Wales	Whig	1849 (special)	Incumbent lost re-election. New senator elected in 1851. Democratic gain.	▌ ✓ James A. Bayard Jr. (Democratic); ▌John Wales (Whig); [data missing]
Florida	David Levy Yulee	Democratic	1845	Incumbent lost re-election. New senator elected in 1851. Democratic hold.	▌ ✓ Stephen Mallory (Democratic); ▌David Levy Yulee (Democratic); [data missing]
Indiana	Jesse D. Bright	Democratic	1844	Incumbent re-elected in 1850.	▌ ✓ Jesse D. Bright (Democratic); [data missing]
Maine	Hannibal Hamlin Sr.	Democratic	1848 (sp.)	Incumbent re-elected.	First ballot (July 25, 1850): ▌Hannibal Hamlin Sr. (Democratic) 75 H; 13 S; ▌George Evans Sr. (Whig) 45 H; 7 S; ▌John Anderson Sr. (Democratic) 22 H; 6 S; ▌Henry William Paine (Democratic) 3 H; 0 S; ▌William Pitt Fessenden Sr. (Whig) 3 H; 0 S; ▌Samuel Fessenden Sr. (Liberty) 2 H; 3 S; ▌Blank 0 H; 1 S; Thirteenth ballot (July 25, 1850): ▌ ✓ Hannibal Hamlin Sr. (Democratic) 77 H; 15 S; ▌George Evans Sr. (Whig) 46 H; 7 S; ▌John Anderson Sr. (Democratic) 21 H; 6 S; ▌Henry William Paine (Democratic) 2 H; 0 S; ▌William Pitt Fessenden Sr. (Whig) 2 H; 0 S; ▌Samuel Fessenden Sr. (Liberty) 2 H; 1 S; ▌Blank 0 H; 1 S
Maryland	Thomas Pratt	Whig	1850 (special)	Incumbent re-elected January 12, 1850.	▌ ✓ Thomas Pratt (Whig) 54 votes; ▌David Stewart (Democratic) 2 votes; Blank 33 votes
Massachusetts	Robert Rantoul Jr.	Democratic	1851 (special)	Incumbent lost re-election or retired. Legislature failed to elect. Democratic loss. Seat would later be filled on April 24, 1851; see below.	▌Charles Sumner (Free Soil) [data missing]
Michigan	Lewis Cass	Democratic	1844 or 1845; 1848 (resigned); 1849 (special)	Incumbent re-elected in 1850 or 1851.	▌ ✓ Lewis Cass (Democratic); [data missing]
Mississippi	Jefferson Davis	Democratic	1847 (appointed); 1848 (special)	Incumbent re-elected in 1850.	▌ ✓ Jefferson Davis (Democratic); [data missing]
Missouri	Thomas H. Benton	Democratic	1821; 1827; 1833; 1839; 1845	Incumbent lost re-election. New senator elected in 1851. Whig gain.	▌ ✓ Henry S. Geyer (Whig); ▌Thomas H. Benton (Democratic); [data missing]
New Jersey	William L. Dayton	Whig	1842 (appointed) ? (special); 1845	Incumbent lost re-election. New senator elected in 1851. Democratic gain.	▌ ✓ Robert F. Stockton (Democratic) 39; ▌William L. Dayton (Whig) 32; ▌Henry A.Ford (Democratic) 3; Joseph F. Randolph (unknown) 2
New York	Daniel S. Dickinson	Democratic	1844 (appointed); 1845	Incumbent lost re-election. Legislature failed to elect. Democratic loss. Seat would later be filled on March 19, 1851; see below.	▌Daniel S. Dickinson (Democratic); Many; see below.
Ohio	Thomas Ewing	Whig	1850 (appointed)	Incumbent lost election to the next term. Legislature failed to elect. Whig loss. Seat would later be filled on March 15, 1851; see below.	▌Thomas Ewing (Whig) [data missing]
Pennsylvania	Daniel Sturgeon	Democratic	1840; 1845	Incumbent retired. New senator elected January 14, 1851. Democratic hold.	▌ ✓ Richard Brodhead (Democratic); Many, see below
Rhode Island	Albert C. Greene	Whig	1844 or 1845	Incumbent retired. New senator elected in 1850 or 1851. Democratic gain.	▌ ✓ Charles T. James (Democratic); [data missing]
Tennessee	Hopkins L. Turney	Democratic	1844	Incumbent retired or lost re-election. New senator elected in 1851. Whig gain.	▌ ✓ James C. Jones (Whig); [data missing]
Texas	Thomas J. Rusk	Democratic	1846	Incumbent re-elected in 1851.	▌ ✓ Thomas J. Rusk (Democratic); [data missing]
Vermont	Samuel S. Phelps	Whig	1839; 1845	Incumbent retired or lost re-election. New senator elected in 1850. Whig hold.	▌ ✓ Solomon Foot (Whig); [data missing]
Virginia	James M. Mason	Democratic	1847 (special)	Incumbent re-elected in 1850.	▌ ✓ James M. Mason (Democratic); [data missing]
Wisconsin	Henry Dodge	Democratic	1848	Incumbent re-elected on January 20, 1851.	▌ ✓ Henry Dodge (Democratic) 83.13%; ▌ James Duane Doty (Ind. Dem.) 8.43%; ▌ Alexander L. Collins (Whig) 3.61%; ▌ Rufus King (Whig) 2.41%; ▌ Warren Chase (Free Soil) 1.20%; ▌ John B. Terry (Whig) 1.20%

=== Elections during the 32nd Congress ===
In late these elections, the winners were elected in 1851 after March 4; ordered by election date.

State	Incumbent			Results	Candidates
State	Senator	Party	Electoral history	Results	Candidates
Ohio (Class 1)	Vacant			Legislature had failed to elect. Winner elected late March 15, 1851 on the 37th ballot. Whig gain.	▌ ✓ Benjamin Wade (Whig); [data missing]
New York (Class 1)	Vacant			Legislature had failed to elect. Winner elected late March 19, 1851. Whig gain.	▌ ✓ Hamilton Fish (Whig); Many, see below
Massachusetts (Class 1)	Vacant			Legislature had failed to elect. Winner elected April 24, 1851. Free Soil gain.	▌ ✓ Charles Sumner (Free Soil); [data missing]
Kentucky (Class 3)	Henry Clay	Whig	1806 (special); 1807 (retired); 1810 (appointed); 1811 (retired); 1831 (special); 1836; 1842 (resigned); 1849	Incumbent resigned December 17, 1851, to be effective September 6, 1852. Winner elected December 30, 1851. Whig hold.	▌ ✓ Archibald Dixon (Whig) 71 votes; ▌James Guthrie (Democratic) 58 votes; ▌Garrett Davis (Whig) 1 vote; ▌Charles S. Morehead (Whig) 1 vote; ▌Joseph R. Underwood (Whig) 1 vote; ▌John L. Helm (Whig) 1 vote

=== Race leading to the 33rd Congress ===
In this regular election, the winner was elected for the term beginning March 4, 1853.

This election involved a Class 3 seat.

State	Incumbent			Results	Candidates
State	Senator	Party	Electoral history	Results	Candidates
Kentucky	Joseph R. Underwood	Whig	1846 or 1847	Incumbent retired. New senator elected December 13, 1851, far in advance of the 1853 term. Know Nothing gain.	▌ ✓ John Burton Thompson (Know Nothing) 73 votes; ▌ Francis P. Stone (Democratic) 65 votes

== Kentucky ==
=== Kentucky (early) ===
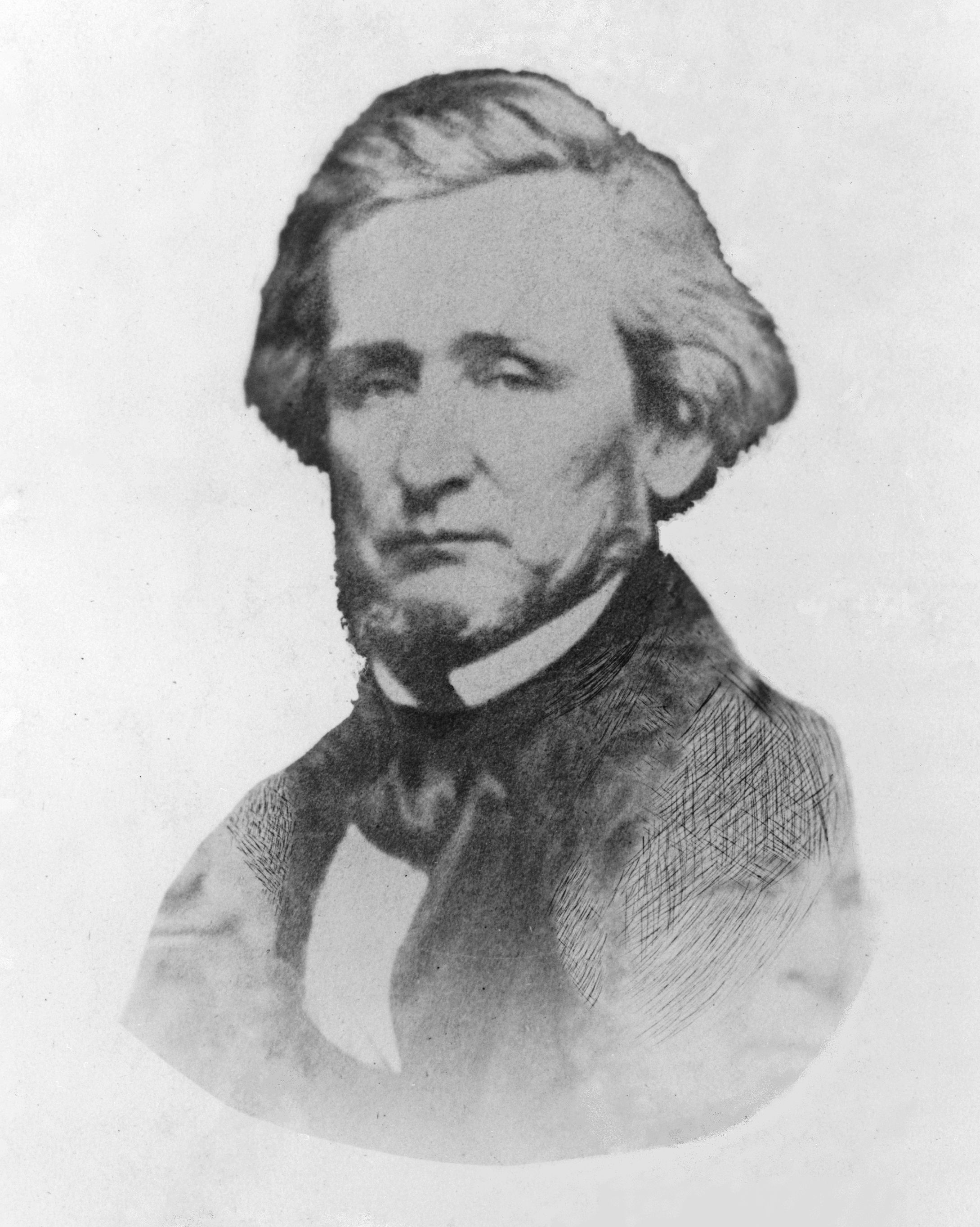
Senator John Burton Thompson

One-term Whig Joseph R. Underwood retired and the Know Nothing Lieutenant Governor of Kentucky John Burton Thompson was elected early, December 13, 1851, far in advance of the 1853 term, as was common practice at the time.

- ✓ John Burton Thompson 73 votes
- Francis P. Stone 65 votes

=== Kentucky (special) ===
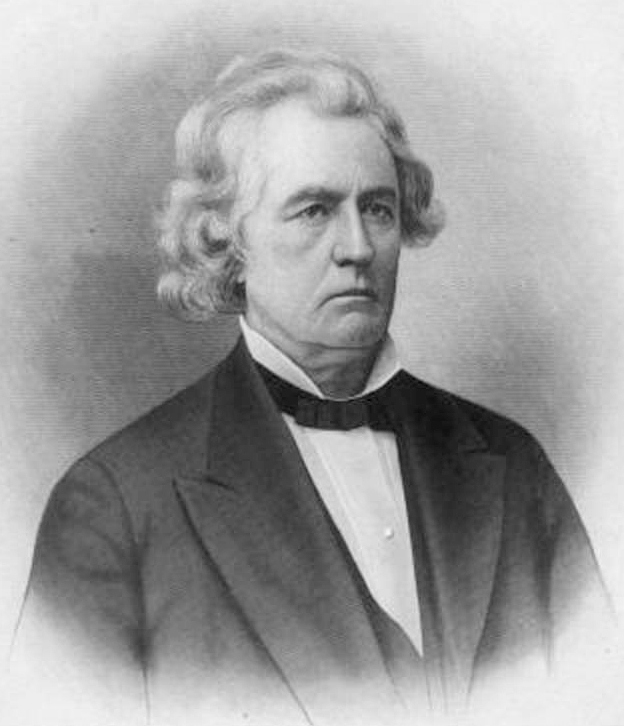
Senator Archibald Dixon

Long-term Whig and former-United States Secretary of State Henry Clay announced his resignation December 17, 1851 from the class 3 seat, to be effective September 6, 1852.

Whig Archibald Dixon was elected December 30, 1851.

After many ballots, the vote in the final deciding ballot was:

- ✓ Archibald Dixon 71 votes
- James Guthrie 58 votes
- Garrett Davis 1 vote
- Charles S. Morehead 1 vote
- Joseph R. Underwood 1 vote
- John L. Helm 1 vote

Before Clay's resignation was effective, he died June 24, 1852. Democratic Secretary of State of Kentucky David Meriwether was appointed July 6, 1852 pending the effective date of the special election. Dixon was then seated September 1, 1852 to finish the term that would end in 1855.

== Maryland ==
=== Maryland (special) ===
1850 United States Senate special election in Maryland
- 1850

80 members of the Maryland General Assembly
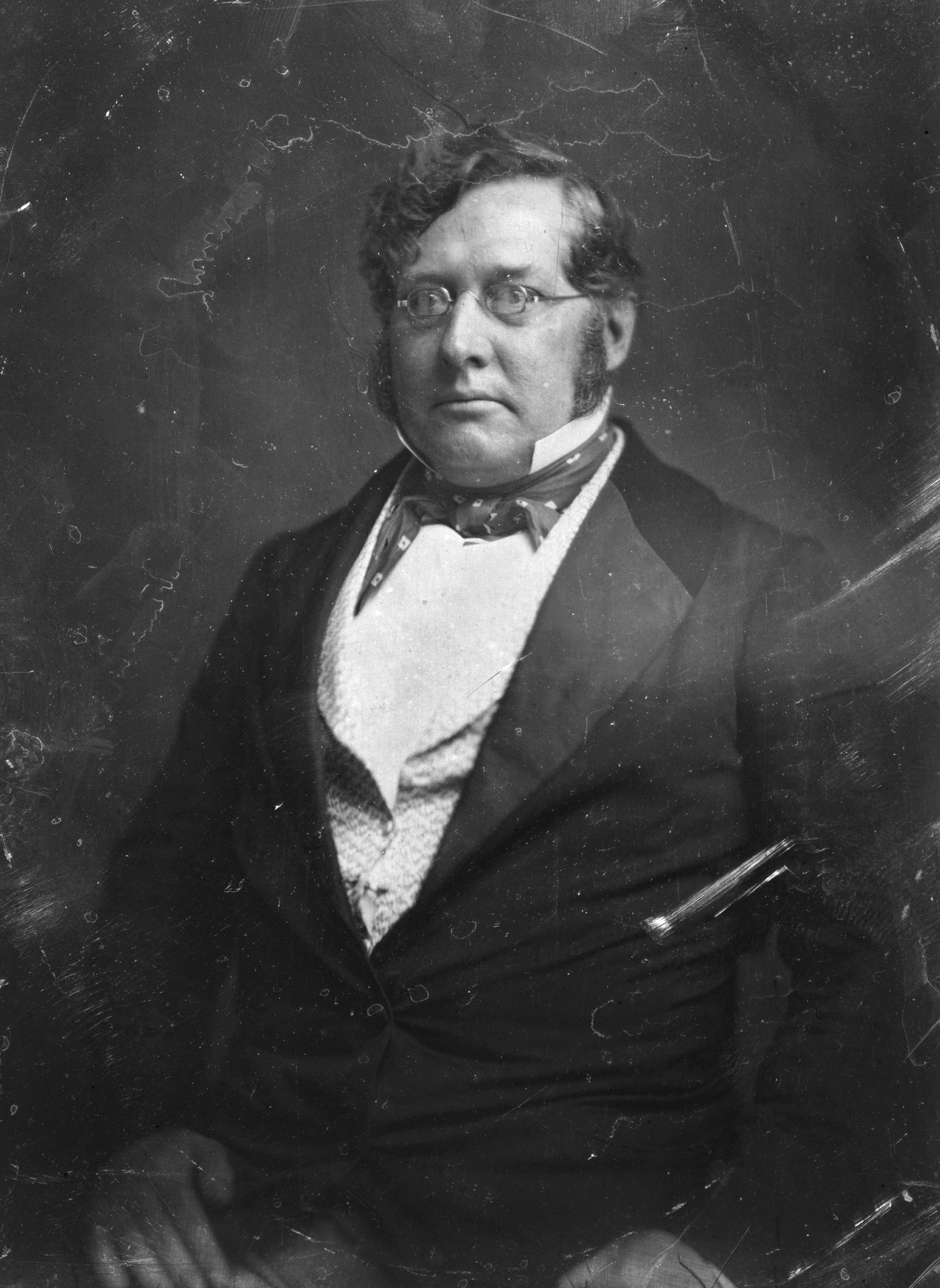
Candidate	Thomas Pratt
Party	Whig
Legislative vote	-
Percentage	-%

Reverdy Johnson won election in 1844 but retired to become the United States Attorney General. In order to fill his seat, David Stewart was elected as a temporary appointment until a successor could be elected. Thomas Pratt won election by an unknown margin of votes, for the Class 1 seat.

=== Maryland (regular) ===
1851 United States Senate election in Maryland
- 1851

80 members of the Maryland General Assembly
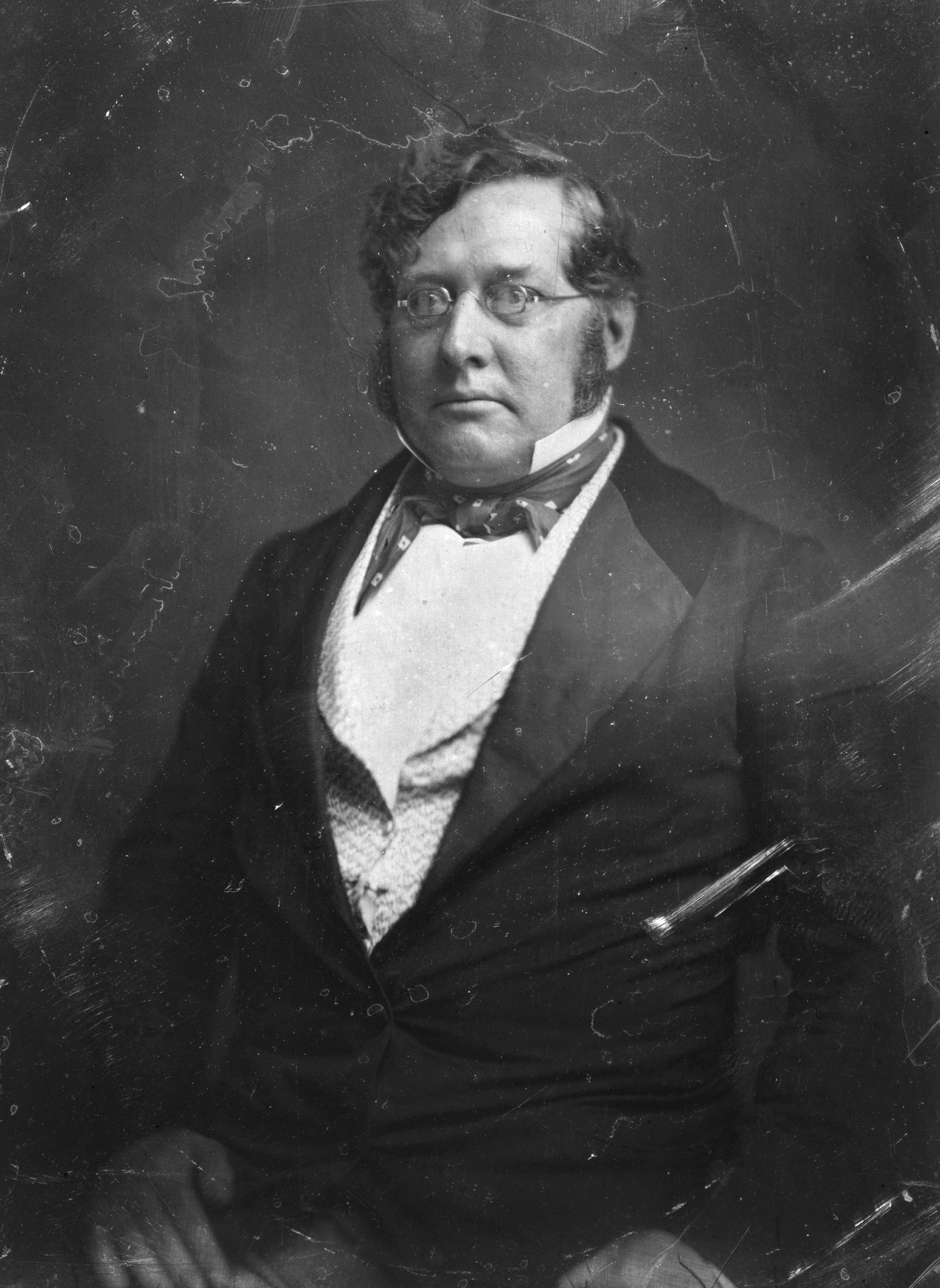
Candidate	Thomas Pratt
Party	Whig
Legislative vote	-
Percentage	-%

Thomas Pratt won election to a full term by an unknown margin of votes, for the Class 1 seat.

== Massachusetts ==
In 1851, Democrats gained control of the legislature in coalition with the Free Soilers. However, the legislature deadlocked on this Senate race, as Democrats refused to vote for Charles Sumner (the Free Soilers' choice).

== New York ==
The election in New York was held on February 4 and March 18 and 19, 1851. Daniel S. Dickinson (Democratic) had been elected in 1845 to this seat, and his term would expire on March 3, 1851. The Whig Party in New York was split in two opposing factions: the Seward/Weed faction (the majority, opposed to the Compromise of 1850) and the "Silver Grays" (supporters of President Millard Fillmore and his compromise legislation, led by Francis Granger whose silver gray hair originated the faction's nickname). The opposing factions of the Democratic Party in New York, the "Barnburners" and the "Hunkers", had reunited at the State election in November 1850, and managed to have almost their whole State ticket elected, only Horatio Seymour was defeated for Governor by a plurality of 262 votes.

At the State election in November 1849, 14 Seward Whigs, 3 Silver Gray Whigs and 15 Democrats were elected for a two-year term (1850–1851) in the State Senate. At the State election in November 1850, a Whig majority was elected to the Assembly for the session of 1851. The 74th New York State Legislature met from January 7 to April 17, and from June 10 to July 11, 1851, at Albany, New York.

Ex-Governor of New York Hamilton Fish was the candidate of the Whig Party, but was also a close friend of Henry Clay who was one of the leaders of the Fillmore faction in Washington, D.C. He was thus considered the only viable compromise candidate. The Silver Grays asked Fish to pledge his support for the Compromise, but Fish refused to make any comment, saying that he did not seek the office, and that the legislators should vote guided by Fish's known political history. Fish had earlier stated his opposition against the Fugitive Slave Law of 1850 but was believed to support most of the remainder of the Compromise. Nevertheless, Silver Gray State Senator James W. Beekman declared that he would not vote for Fish for personal reasons, a dislike stemming from the time when they were fellow students at Columbia University.

The State Legislature met on February 4, the legally prescribed day, to elect a U.S. Senator. In the Assembly, Fish received a majority of 78 to 49. In the State Senate the vote stood 16 for Fish and 16 votes for a variety of candidates, among them Beekman's vote for Francis Granger. After a second ballot with the same result, Beekman moved to adjourn, which was carried by the casting vote of the lieutenant governor, and no nomination was made.

On February 14, Senator George B. Guinnip offered a resolution to declare John Adams Dix elected to the U.S. Senate. On motion of Senator George R. Babcock, the resolution was laid on the table, i.e. consideration was postponed.

On February 15, Guinnip again offered a resolution to declare John Adams Dix elected to the U.S. Senate. Senator Stephen H. Johnson offered an amendment to this resolution, declaring Daniel S. Dickinson elected. On motion of Senator Marius Schoonmaker, the resolution was laid on the table too.

On March 18, when two Democratic State Senators were absent, having gone to New York City, the Whigs persuaded the Democrats in a 14-hour session to re-open the U.S. Senate election, and Senate electionin the small hours of March 19 Fish was nominated by a vote of 16 to 12 (Beekman, Johnson (both Whigs), Thomas B. Carroll and William A. Dart (both Democratic) did not vote).

Fish was the choice of both the Assembly and the Senate, and was declared elected.

Candidate	Party	Senate (32 members) February 4 (first ballot)	Senate (32 members) February 4 (second ballot)	Assembly (128 members) February 4	Senate (32 members) March 19	Assembly (128 members) March 19
Hamilton Fish	Whig	16	16	78	16	68
John Adams Dix	Democratic	1	1	29	6	6
James T. Brady	Democratic			7		
Horatio Seymour	Democratic	1	1	4	1	
Francis Granger	Whig	1	1	2		1
Aaron Ward	Democratic	1	1		1	
Daniel S. Dickinson	Democratic	1	1		1	
Arphaxed Loomis	Democratic	1	1		1	
Amasa J. Parker	Democratic	1	1		1	
David Buel Jr.	Democratic	1	1			
Augustus C. Hand	Democratic	1	1			
John Hunter	Democratic	1	1			
John Fine	Democratic	1	1			
Levi S. Chatfield	Democratic	1	1			
John Tracy	Democratic	1	1			
Abraham Bockee	Democratic	1	1			
George Rathbun	Democratic	1	1			
Timothy Jenkins	Democratic	1	1			
William L. Marcy	Democratic			1		
Washington Irving				1		
John L. Riker				1		
Erastus Corning	Democratic			1		
Levi S. Chatfield	Democratic			1		
George Wood				1		
Daniel Lord				1		
James S. Wadsworth	Democratic				1	
William C. Bouck	Democratic					1

== Ohio ==
Incumbent Senator Thomas Corwin (Whig) resigned July 20, 1850 to become U.S. Secretary of the Treasury. Thomas Ewing (Whig) was appointed July 20, 1850 to finish the term. Benjamin Wade (Whig) was elected late on March 15, 1851, on the 37th ballot over Ewing.

== Pennsylvania ==
The Pennsylvania election was held January 14, 1851. Richard Brodhead was elected by the Pennsylvania General Assembly to the United States Senate.

State Legislature results
Party	Candidate	Votes	%
Democratic	Richard Brodhead	76	57.14
Whig	Andrew W. Loomis	12	9.02
Whig	Alexander Brown	11	8.27
Whig	Samuel Purviance	4	3.01
Whig	Samuel Calvin	4	3.01
Whig	Thomas M. T. McKennan	4	3.01
Whig	John Sergeant	4	3.01
Whig	George Chambers	3	2.26
Whig	John Dickey	2	1.50
Whig	James Pollock	2	1.50
Whig	John Allison	1	0.75
Whig	William Darlington	1	0.75
Whig	Townsend Haines	1	0.75
Whig	Charles Pitman	1	0.75
Whig	Daniel M. Smyser	1	0.75
Whig	Thomas White	1	0.75
Whig	David Wilmot	1	0.75
N/A	Not voting	3	2.26
Totals		133	100.00%

== See also ==
- 1850 United States elections
  - 1850–51 United States House of Representatives elections
- 31st United States Congress
- 32nd United States Congress

== Sources ==
- Party Division in the Senate, 1789-Present, via Senate.gov
- The New York Civil List compiled in 1858 (see: pg. 63 for U.S. Senators [gives wrong date for election "November 19"]; pg. 137 for State Senators 1851; pg. 240ff for Members of Assembly 1851)
- Members of the 32nd United States Congress
- Hamilton Fish by Amos Elwood Corning (pages 35ff)
- Result Assembly: Journal of the Assembly (74th Session) (1851; Vol. I, pg. 268f and 662)
- Result Senate: Journal of the Senate (74th Session) (1851; pg. 136f and 322)
- The Papers of Henry Clay (Vol. 10; page 859)
- The Rise and Fall of the American Whig Party by Michael F. Holt (pages 649f)
- "Journal of the House of Representatives of the Commonwealth of Kentucky, November 3, 1851 - January 9, 1852". Journals of the General Assembly of the Commonwealth of Kentucky. Frankfort, Kentucky: Albert G. Hodges. 1851.
- Pennsylvania Election Statistics: 1682-2006 from the Wilkes University Election Statistics Project
