= 29th United States Congress =

1845-1847 U.S. Congress

←	28th	30th	→
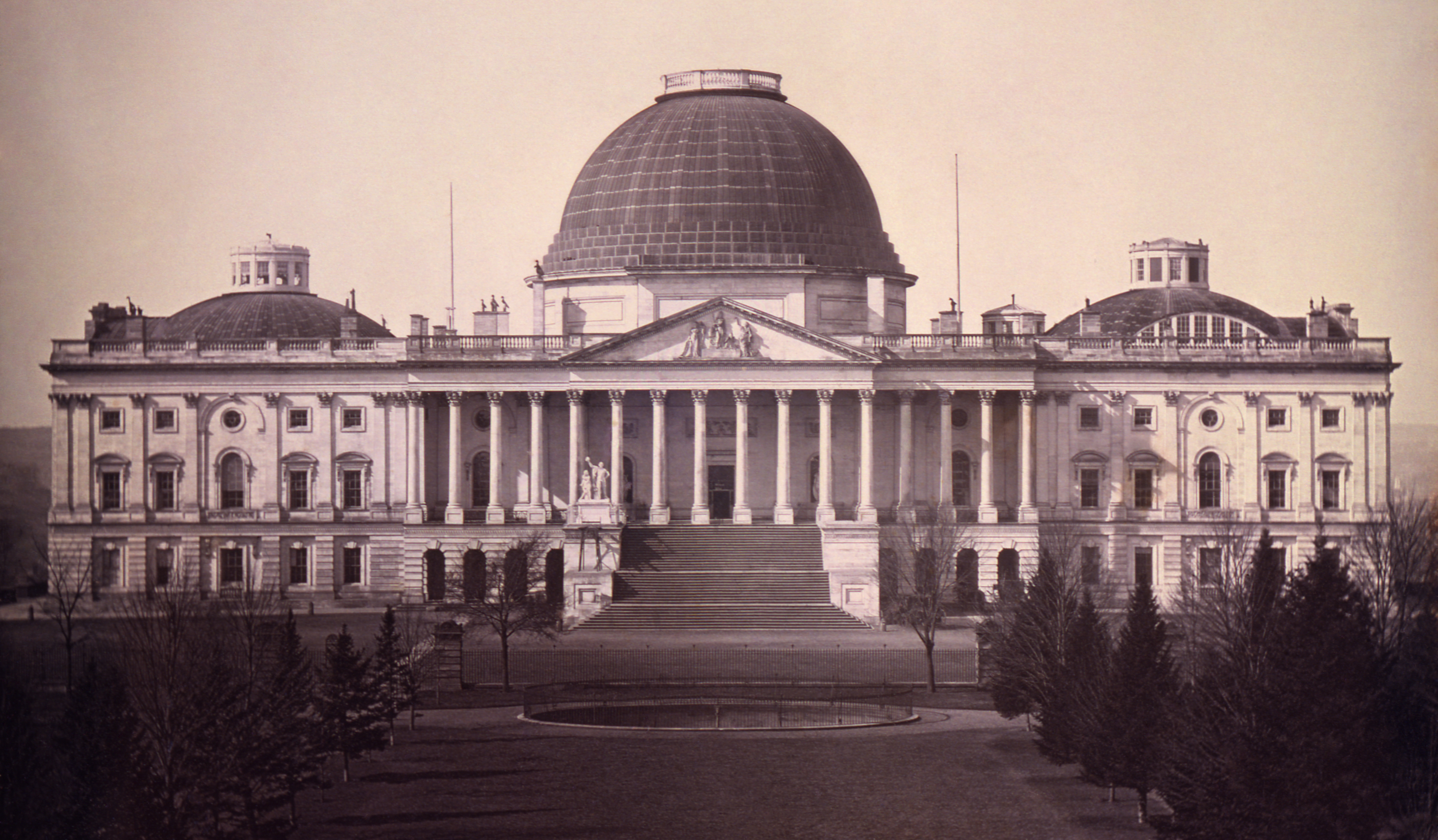
- United States Capitol (1846)

Overview
- Legislative body: United States Congress
- Jurisdiction: United States
- Term: March 4, 1845 – March 4, 1847

Senate
- Members: 58
- President: George M. Dallas (D)
- President pro tempore: Willie P. Mangum (W); Ambrose H. Sevier (D); David R. Atchison (D)
- Party control: Democratic

House of Representatives
- Members: 228 representatives 2 non-voting delegates
- Speaker: John W. Davis (D)
- Party control: Democratic

Sessions
- Special (Note: Special session of the Senate.): March 4, 1845 – March 20, 1845
- 1st: December 1, 1845 – August 10, 1846
- 2nd: December 7, 1846 – March 3, 1847

The 29th United States Congress was a meeting of the legislative branch of the United States federal government, consisting of the United States Senate and the United States House of Representatives. It met in Washington, D.C. from March 4, 1845, to March 4, 1847, during the first two years of James Polk's presidency. The apportionment of seats in the House of Representatives was based on the 1840 United States census. Both chambers had a Democratic majority.

== Major events ==
- March 4, 1845: James K. Polk became President of the United States
- October 10, 1845: The Naval School (later renamed the United States Naval Academy) opened in Annapolis, Maryland
- December 2, 1845: President Polk announced to Congress that the Monroe Doctrine should be strictly enforced and that the United States should aggressively expand into the West.
- April 25, 1846: Open conflict over border disputes of Texas's boundaries began the Mexican–American War
- August 10, 1846: Establishment of the Smithsonian Institution, thanks to the bequest of Englishman James Smithson

== Major legislation ==
- May 13, 1846: Mexican–American War declared, ch. 16, 9 Stat. 9
- July 9, 1846: District of Columbia retrocession, ch. 35, 9 Stat. 35
- July 30, 1846: Walker tariff, ch. 74, 9 Stat. 42
- August 6, 1846: Independent Treasury Act of 1846, Sess. 1, ch. 90, 9 Stat. 59

== Treaties ==
- June 15, 1846: Oregon Treaty established the 49th parallel as the border between the United States and Canada, from the Rocky Mountains to the Strait of Juan de Fuca
- January 13, 1847: Treaty of Cahuenga ended the fighting in the Mexican–American War in California (not a formal treaty between nations but an informal agreement between rival military forces)

== States admitted ==
- December 29, 1845: Texas admitted as the 28th state
- December 28, 1846: Iowa admitted as the 29th state

== Party summary ==
=== Senate ===
During this congress, two Senate seats were added for each of the new states of Texas and Iowa.

	Party (shading shows control)				Total	Vacant
	Democratic (D)	Liberty (L)	Whig (W)	Other	Total	Vacant
End of previous congress	23	0	27	1	51	3
Begin	26	0	24	0	50	4
End	31	1	24	0	56	2
Final voting share	55.4%	1.8%	42.9%	0.0%		
Beginning of next congress	34	0	20	1	55	3

=== House of Representatives ===
During this congress, two House seats were added for each of the new states of Texas and Iowa.

	Party (shading shows control)				Total	Vacant
	American (A)	Democratic (D)	Whig (W)	Other	Total	Vacant
End of previous congress	0	141	78	4	223	1
Begin	6	137	78	0	221	3
End	6	142	78	0	226	2
Final voting share	2.7%	62.8%	34.5%	0.0%		
Beginning of next congress	1	107	116	3	227	1

== Leadership ==
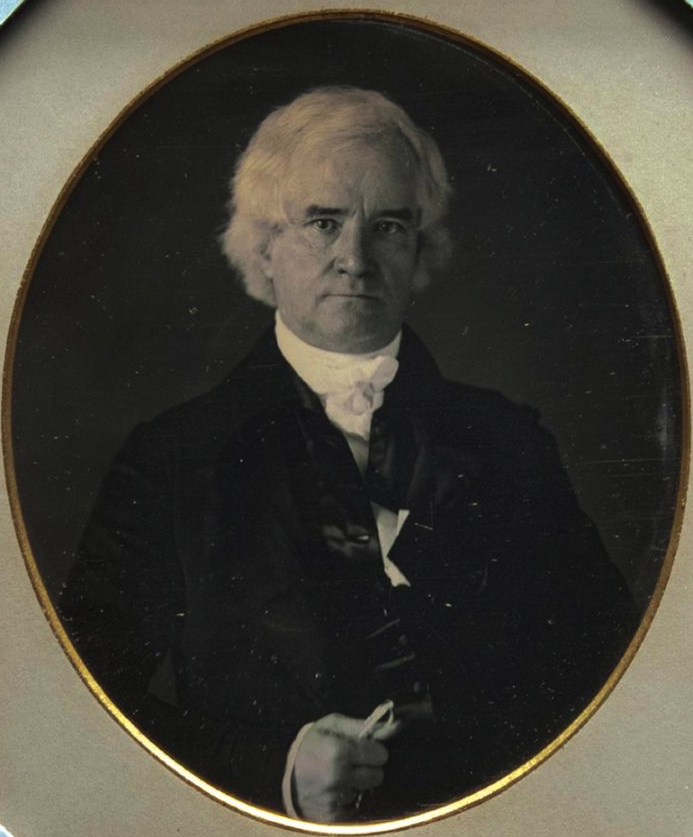
President of the Senate George M. Dallas (D)

Presidents pro tempore

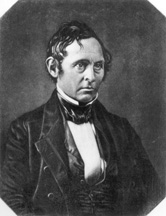
Willie P. Mangum (D)
until March 4, 1845

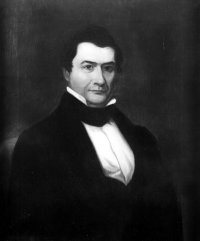
Ambrose H. Sevier (D)
on December 27, 1845

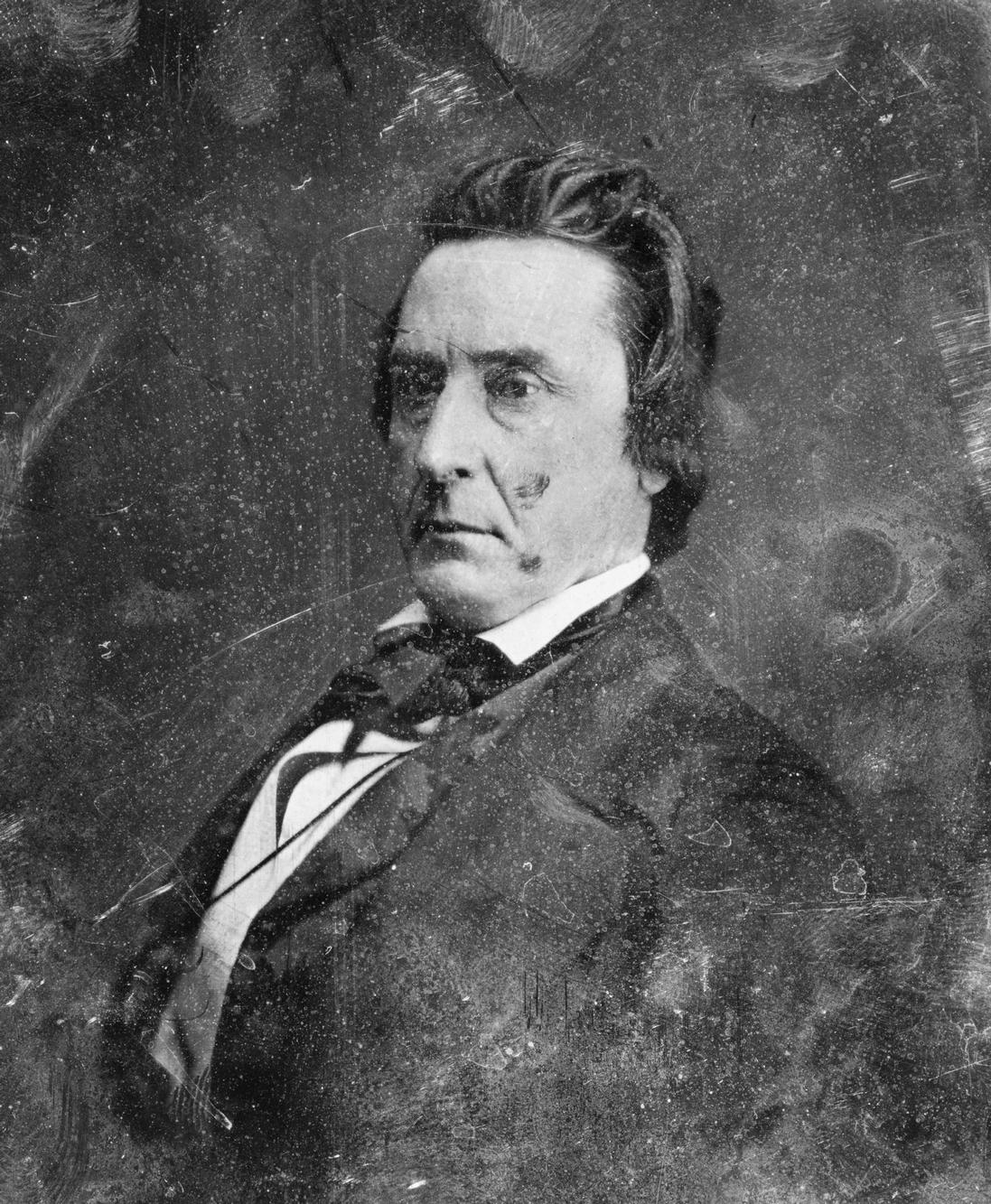
David R. Atchison (D)
from August 8, 1846

=== Senate ===
- President: George M. Dallas (D)
- President pro tempore: Willie P. Mangum (W), until March 4, 1845
  - Ambrose Hundley Sevier (D), only on December 27, 1845
  - David R. Atchison (D), from August 8, 1846

=== House of Representatives ===
- Speaker: John W. Davis (D)

== Members ==
This list is arranged by chamber, then by state. Senators are listed by class and representatives are listed by district.

Skip to House of Representatives, below

=== Senate ===
Senators were elected by the state legislatures every two years, with one-third beginning new six-year terms with each Congress. Preceding the names in the list below are Senate class numbers, which indicate the cycle of their election. In this Congress, Class 1 meant their term began with this Congress, facing re-election in 1850; Class 2 meant their term ended with this Congress, facing re-election in 1846; and Class 3 meant their term began in the last Congress, facing re-election in 1848.

==== Alabama ====
▌2. Dixon H. Lewis (D)
▌3. Arthur P. Bagby (D)

==== Arkansas ====
▌2. Chester Ashley (D)
▌3. Ambrose H. Sevier (D)

==== Connecticut ====
▌1. Jabez W. Huntington (W)
▌3. John M. Niles (D)

==== Delaware ====
▌1. John M. Clayton (W)
▌2. Thomas Clayton (W)

==== Florida ====
▌1. David Levy Yulee (D), from July 1, 1845
▌3. James Westcott (D), from July 1, 1845

==== Georgia ====
▌2. John M. Berrien (W), until May, 1845; from November 13, 1845
▌3. Walter T. Colquitt (D)

==== Illinois ====
▌2. James Semple (D)
▌3. Sidney Breese (D)

==== Indiana ====
▌1. Jesse D. Bright (D)
▌3. Edward A. Hannegan (D)

==== Iowa ====
2. Vacant after being admitted to the Union December 28, 1846
3. Vacant after being admitted to the Union December 28, 1846

==== Kentucky ====
▌2. James T. Morehead (W)
▌3. John J. Crittenden (W)

==== Louisiana ====
▌2. Alexander Barrow (W), until December 29, 1846

▌Pierre Soulé (D), from January 21, 1847

▌3. Henry Johnson (W)

==== Maine ====
▌1. John Fairfield (D)
▌2. George Evans (W)

==== Maryland ====
▌1. Reverdy Johnson (W)
▌3. James Pearce (W)

==== Massachusetts ====
▌1. Daniel Webster (W)
▌2. Isaac C. Bates (W), until March 16, 1845

▌John Davis (W), from March 24, 1845

==== Michigan ====
▌1. Lewis Cass (D)
▌2. William Woodbridge (W)

==== Mississippi ====
▌1. Jesse Speight (D)
▌2. Robert J. Walker (D), until March 5, 1845

▌Joseph W. Chalmers (D), from November 3, 1845

==== Missouri ====
▌1. Thomas H. Benton (D)
▌3. David R. Atchison (D)

==== New Hampshire ====
▌2. Levi Woodbury (D), until September 20, 1845

▌Benning W. Jenness (D), from December 1, 1845, until June 13, 1846
▌Joseph Cilley (L), from June 13, 1846

▌3. Charles G. Atherton (D)

==== New Jersey ====
▌1. William L. Dayton (W)
▌2. Jacob W. Miller (W)

==== New York ====
▌1. Daniel S. Dickinson (D)
▌3. John A. Dix (D)

==== North Carolina ====
▌2. Willie P. Mangum (W)
▌3. William H. Haywood Jr. (D), until July 25, 1846

▌George E. Badger (W), from November 26, 1846

==== Ohio ====
▌1. Thomas Corwin (W)
▌3. William Allen (D)

==== Pennsylvania ====
▌1. Daniel Sturgeon (D)
▌3. James Buchanan (D), until March 5, 1845

▌Simon Cameron (D), from March 13, 1845

==== Rhode Island ====
▌1. Albert C. Greene (W)
▌2. James F. Simmons (W)

==== South Carolina ====
▌2. John C. Calhoun (D), from November 26, 1845
▌3. George McDuffie (D), until August 17, 1846

▌Andrew Butler (D), from December 4, 1846

==== Tennessee ====
▌1. Hopkins L. Turney (D)
▌2. Spencer Jarnagin (W)

==== Texas ====
▌1. Thomas J. Rusk (D), from February 21, 1846 (newly admitted state)
▌2. Samuel Houston (D), from February 21, 1846 (newly admitted state)

==== Vermont ====
▌1. Samuel S. Phelps (W)
▌3. William Upham (W)

==== Virginia ====
▌1. Isaac S. Pennybacker (D), December 3, 1845 – January 12, 1847

▌James M. Mason (D), from January 21, 1847

▌2. William S. Archer (W)

Senators' party membership by state at the opening of the 29th Congress in March 1845. The senators from Florida and Texas were not seated until later in the Congress. 2 Democrats 1 Democrat and 1 Whig 2 Whigs

=== House of Representatives ===
The names of representatives are preceded by their district numbers.

==== Alabama ====
▌1. Edmund S. Dargan (D)
▌2. Henry W. Hilliard (W)
▌3. William L. Yancey (D), until September 1, 1846

▌James L. Cottrell (D), from December 7, 1846

▌4. William W. Payne (D)
▌5. George S. Houston (D)
▌6. Reuben Chapman (D)
▌7. Felix G. McConnell (D), until September 10, 1846

▌Franklin W. Bowdon (D), from December 7, 1846

==== Arkansas ====
▌At-large. Archibald Yell (D), until July 1, 1846

▌Thomas W. Newton (W), from February 6, 1847

==== Connecticut ====
▌1. James Dixon (W)
▌2. Samuel D. Hubbard (W)
▌3. John A. Rockwell (W)
▌4. Truman Smith (W)

==== Delaware ====
▌At-large. John W. Houston (W)

==== Florida ====
▌At-large. Edward C. Cabell (W), from October 6, 1845, until January 24, 1846

▌William H. Brockenbrough (D), from January 24, 1846

==== Georgia ====
▌1. Thomas Butler King (W)
▌2. Seaborn Jones (D)
▌3. George W. B. Towns (D), from January 5, 1846
▌4. Hugh A. Haralson (D)
▌5. John H. Lumpkin (D)
▌6. Howell Cobb (D)
▌7. Alexander H. Stephens (W)
▌8. Robert A. Toombs (W)

==== Illinois ====
▌1. Robert Smith (D)
▌2. John A. McClernand (D)
▌3. Orlando B. Ficklin (D)
▌4. John Wentworth (D)
▌5. Stephen A. Douglas (D), until March 3, 1847
▌6. Joseph P. Hoge (D)
▌7. Edward D. Baker (W), until January 15, 1847

▌John Henry (W), from February 5, 1847

==== Indiana ====
▌1. Robert D. Owen (D)
▌2. Thomas J. Henley (D)
▌3. Thomas Smith (D)
▌4. Caleb B. Smith (W)
▌5. William W. Wick (D)
▌6. John W. Davis (D)
▌7. Edward W. McGaughey (W)
▌8. John Pettit (D)
▌9. Charles W. Cathcart (D)
▌10. Andrew Kennedy (D)

==== Iowa ====
▌At-large. S. Clifton Hastings (D), from December 28, 1846 (newly admitted state)
▌At-large. Shepherd Leffler (D), from December 28, 1846 (newly admitted state)

==== Kentucky ====
▌1. Linn Boyd (D)
▌2. John H. McHenry (W)
▌3. Henry Grider (W)
▌4. Joshua F. Bell (W)
▌5. Bryan R. Young (W)
▌6. John P. Martin (D)
▌7. William P. Thomasson (W)
▌8. Garrett Davis (W)
▌9. Andrew A. Trumbo (W)
▌10. John W. Tibbatts (D)

==== Louisiana ====
▌1. John Slidell (D), until November 10, 1845

▌Emile La Sére (D), from January 29, 1846

▌2. Bannon G. Thibodeaux (W)
▌3. John H. Harmanson (D)
▌4. Isaac E. Morse (D)

==== Maine ====
▌1. John F. Scamman (D)
▌2. Robert P. Dunlap (D)
▌3. Luther Severance (W)
▌4. John D. McCrate (D)
▌5. Cullen Sawtelle (D)
▌6. Hannibal Hamlin (D)
▌7. Hezekiah Williams (D)

==== Maryland ====
▌1. John G. Chapman (W)
▌2. Thomas J. Perry (D)
▌3. Thomas W. Ligon (D)
▌4. William F. Giles (D)
▌5. Albert Constable (D)
▌6. Edward H. C. Long (W)

==== Massachusetts ====
▌1. Robert C. Winthrop (W)
▌2. Daniel P. King (W)
▌3. Amos Abbott (W)
▌4. Benjamin Thompson (W)
▌5. Charles Hudson (W)
▌6. George Ashmun (W)
▌7. Julius Rockwell (W)
▌8. John Quincy Adams (W)
▌9. Artemas Hale (W)
▌10. Joseph Grinnell (W)

==== Michigan ====
▌1. Robert McClelland (D)
▌2. John S. Chipman (D)
▌3. James B. Hunt (D)

==== Mississippi ====
▌At-large. Stephen Adams (D)
▌At-large. Jefferson Davis (D), until October 28, 1846

▌Henry T. Ellett (D), from January 26, 1847

▌At-large. Robert W. Roberts (D)
▌At-large. Jacob Thompson (D)

==== Missouri ====
▌At-large. James B. Bowlin (D)
▌At-large. John S. Phelps (D)
▌At-large. Sterling Price (D), until August 12, 1846

▌William McDaniel (D), from December 7, 1846

▌At-large. James H. Relfe (D)
▌At-large. Leonard H. Sims (D)

==== New Hampshire ====
▌At-large. James H. Johnson (D)
▌At-large. Mace Moulton (D)
▌At-large. Moses Norris Jr. (D)
At-large. Vacant

==== New Jersey ====
▌1. James G. Hampton (W)
▌2. Samuel G. Wright (W), until July 30, 1845

▌George Sykes (D), from November 4, 1845

▌3. John Runk (W)
▌4. Joseph E. Edsall (D)
▌5. William Wright (W)

==== New York ====
▌1. John W. Lawrence (D)
▌2. Henry J. Seaman (A)
▌3. William S. Miller (A)
▌4. William B. Maclay (D)
▌5. Thomas M. Woodruff (A)
▌6. William W. Campbell (A)
▌7. Joseph H. Anderson (D)
▌8. William W. Woodworth (D)
▌9. Archibald C. Niven (D)
▌10. Samuel Gordon (D)
▌11. John F. Collin (D)
▌12. Richard P. Herrick (W), until June 20, 1846

▌Thomas C. Ripley (W), from December 17, 1846

▌13. Bradford R. Wood (D)
▌14. Erastus D. Culver (W)
▌15. Joseph Russell (D)
▌16. Hugh White (W)
▌17. Charles S. Benton (D)
▌18. Preston King (D)
▌19. Orville Hungerford (D)
▌20. Timothy Jenkins (D)
▌21. Charles Goodyear (D)
▌22. Stephen Strong (D)
▌23. William J. Hough (D)
▌24. Horace Wheaton (D)
▌25. George O. Rathbun (D)
▌26. Samuel S. Ellsworth (D)
▌27. John De Mott (D)
▌28. Elias B. Holmes (W)
▌29. Charles H. Carroll (W)
▌30. Martin Grover (D)
▌31. Abner Lewis (W)
▌32. William A. Moseley (W)
▌33. Albert Smith (W)
▌34. Washington Hunt (W)

==== North Carolina ====
▌1. James Graham (W)
▌2. Daniel M. Barringer (W)
▌3. David S. Reid (D)
▌4. Alfred Dockery (W)
▌5. James C. Dobbin (D)
▌6. James I. McKay (D)
▌7. John R. J. Daniel (D)
▌8. Henry S. Clark (D)
▌9. Asa Biggs (D)

==== Ohio ====
▌1. James J. Faran (D)
▌2. Francis A. Cunningham (D)
▌3. Robert C. Schenck (W)
▌4. Joseph Vance (W)
▌5. William Sawyer (D)
▌6. Henry St. John (D)
▌7. Joseph J. McDowell (D)
▌8. Allen G. Thurman (D)
▌9. Augustus L. Perrill (D)
▌10. Columbus Delano (W)
▌11. Jacob Brinkerhoff (D)
▌12. Samuel F. Vinton (W)
▌13. Isaac Parrish (D)
▌14. Alexander Harper (W)
▌15. Joseph Morris (D)
▌16. John D. Cummins (D)
▌17. George Fries (D)
▌18. David A. Starkweather (D)
▌19. Daniel R. Tilden (W)
▌20. Joshua R. Giddings (W)
▌21. Joseph M. Root (W)

==== Pennsylvania ====
▌1. Lewis C. Levin (A)
▌2. Joseph R. Ingersoll (W)
▌3. John H. Campbell (A)
▌4. Charles J. Ingersoll (D)
▌5. Jacob S. Yost (D)
▌6. Jacob Erdman (D)
▌7. Abraham R. McIlvaine (W)
▌8. John Strohm (W)
▌9. John Ritter (D)
▌10. Richard Brodhead (D)
▌11. Owen D. Leib (D)
▌12. David Wilmot (D)
▌13. James Pollock (W)
▌14. Alexander Ramsey (W)
▌15. Moses McClean (D)
▌16. James Black (D)
▌17. John Blanchard (W)
▌18. Andrew Stewart (W)
▌19. Henry D. Foster (D)
▌20. John H. Ewing (W)
▌21. Cornelius Darragh (W)
▌22. William S. Garvin (D)
▌23. James Thompson (D)
▌24. Joseph Buffington (W)

==== Rhode Island ====
▌1. Henry Y. Cranston (W)
▌2. Lemuel H. Arnold (W)

==== South Carolina ====
▌1. James A. Black (D)
▌2. Richard F. Simpson (D)
▌3. Joseph A. Woodward (D)
▌4. Alexander D. Sims (D)
▌5. Armistead Burt (D)
▌6. Isaac E. Holmes (D)
▌7. Robert Rhett (D)

==== Tennessee ====
▌1. Andrew Johnson (D)
▌2. William M. Cocke (W)
▌3. John H. Crozier (W)
▌4. Alvan Cullom (D)
▌5. George W. Jones (D)
▌6. Barclay Martin (D)
▌7. Meredith P. Gentry (W)
▌8. Joseph H. Peyton (W), until November 11, 1845

▌Edwin H. Ewing (W), from January 2, 1846

▌9. Lucien B. Chase (D)
▌10. Frederick P. Stanton (D)
▌11. Milton Brown (W)

==== Texas ====
▌1. David S. Kaufman (D), from March 30, 1846 (newly admitted state)
▌2. Timothy Pilsbury (D), from March 30, 1846 (newly admitted state)

==== Vermont ====
▌1. Solomon Foot (W)
▌2. Jacob Collamer (W)
▌3. George P. Marsh (W)
▌4. Paul Dillingham Jr. (D)

==== Virginia ====
▌1. Archibald Atkinson (D)
▌2. George C. Dromgoole (D)
▌3. William M. Tredway (D)
▌4. Edmund W. Hubard (D)
▌5. Shelton F. Leake (D)
▌6. James A. Seddon (D)
▌7. Thomas H. Bayly (D)
▌8. Robert M. T. Hunter (D)
▌9. John S. Pendleton (W)
▌10. Henry Bedinger (D)
▌11. William Taylor (D), until January 17, 1846

▌James McDowell (D), from March 6, 1846

▌12. Augustus A. Chapman (D)
▌13. George W. Hopkins (D)
▌14. Joseph Johnson (D)
▌15. William G. Brown Sr. (D)

==== Non-voting members ====
▌Iowa Territory. Augustus C. Dodge (D), until December 28, 1846
▌Wisconsin Territory. Morgan L. Martin (D)

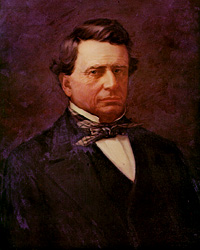
Speaker John W: Davis

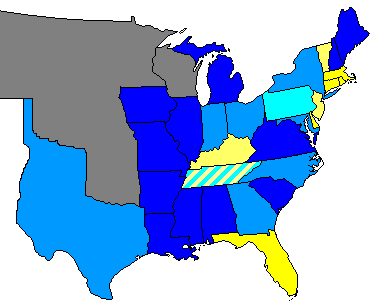
House seats by party holding plurality in state: 80+% to 100% Democratic / Up to 60% Whig; 60+% to 80% Democratic / 60+% to 80% Whig; Up to 60% Democratic / 80+% to 100% Whig

== Changes in membership ==
The count below reflects changes from the beginning of the first session of this Congress.

=== Senate ===
- Replacements: 8
  - Democrats (D): no net change
  - Whigs (W): no net change
- Deaths: 3
- Resignations: 6
- Interim appointments: 1
- Seats of newly admitted states: 4
- Total seats with changes: 14

Senate changes
State (class)	Vacated by	Reason for change	Successor	Date of successor's formal installation (Note: When seated or oath administered, not necessarily when service began.)
Florida (1)	Vacant	Florida admitted to the Union at end of previous congress	David L. Yulee (D)	Elected July 1, 1845
Florida (3)	Vacant	Florida admitted to the Union at end of previous congress	James Westcott (D)	Elected July 1, 1845
South Carolina (2)	Vacant	Senator Daniel E. Huger resigned in previous congress. Successor elected November 26, 1845.	John C. Calhoun (D)	Elected November 26, 1845
Virginia (1)	Vacant	Failure to elect	Isaac S. Pennybacker (D)	Elected December 3, 1845
Mississippi (2)	Robert J. Walker (D)	Resigned March 5, 1845, after being appointed U.S. Secretary of the Treasury. Successor appointed November 3, 1845. Appointee was later elected on an unknown date.	Joseph W. Chalmers (D)	Appointed November 3, 1845
Pennsylvania (3)	James Buchanan (D)	Resigned March 5, 1845, after being appointed U.S. Secretary of State	Simon Cameron (D)	Elected March 13, 1845
Massachusetts (2)	Isaac C. Bates (W)	Died March 16, 1845	John Davis (W)	Elected March 24, 1845
Georgia (2)	John M. Berrien (W)	Resigned May, 1845 when appointed to the Georgia Supreme Court	John M. Berrien (W)	Elected November 13, 1845
New Hampshire (2)	Levi Woodbury (D)	Resigned November 20, 1845, to become Associate Justice of the U.S. Supreme Court	Benning W. Jenness (D)	Appointed December 1, 1845
Texas (1)	Texas admitted to the Union December 29, 1845, and remained vacant until February 21, 1846		Thomas J. Rusk (D)	Elected February 21, 1846
Texas (2)	Texas admitted to the Union December 29, 1845, and remained vacant until February 21, 1846		Sam Houston (D)	Elected February 21, 1846
New Hampshire (2)	Benning W. Jenness (D)	Lost election to finish the term. Winner elected June 13, 1846.	Joseph Cilley (L)	Elected June 13, 1846
North Carolina (3)	William H. Haywood Jr. (D)	Resigned July 25, 1846, after having refused to be instructed by the North Carolina state legislature on a tariff question	George E. Badger (W)	Elected November 25, 1846
South Carolina (3)	George McDuffie (D)	Resigned August 17, 1846. Successor appointed December 4, 1846, and subsequently elected to finish the term.	Andrew Butler (D)	Seated December 4, 1846
Iowa (2)	Iowa admitted to the Union December 28, 1846		Vacant	Not filled this term
Iowa (3)	Iowa admitted to the Union December 28, 1846		Vacant	Not filled this term
Louisiana (2)	Alexander Barrow (W)	Died December 29, 1846	Pierre Soulé (D)	Elected January 21, 1847
Virginia (1)	Isaac S. Pennybacker (D)	Died January 12, 1847	James M. Mason (D)	Elected January 21, 1847

=== House of Representatives ===
- Replacements: 12
  - Democrats (D): 1 seat net gain
  - Whigs (W): 1 seat net loss
- Deaths: 5
- Resignations: 6
- Contested election: 1
- Seats of newly admitted states: 4
- Total seats with changes: 17

House changes
District	Vacated by	Reason for change	Successor	Date of successor's formal installation
Florida At-large	Vacant	Florida admitted to the Union at end of previous congress	Edward C. Cabell (W)	Seated October 6, 1845
Georgia 3rd	Vacant	Rep-elect Washington Poe declined the seat	George W. Towns (D)	Seated January 5, 1846
Texas 1st	Texas admitted into the Union December 29, 1845, and seat remained vacant until March 30, 1846		David S. Kaufman (D)	Seated March 30, 1846
Texas 2nd	Texas admitted into the Union December 29, 1845, and seat remained vacant until March 30, 1846		Timothy Pilsbury (D)	Seated March 30, 1846
New Jersey 2nd	Samuel G. Wright (W)	Died July 30, 1845	George Sykes (D)	Seated November 4, 1845
Louisiana 1st	John Slidell (D)	Resigned November 10, 1845, after being appointed Minister to Mexico, but government refused to accept him	Emile La Sére (D)	Seated January 29, 1846
Tennessee 8th	Joseph H. Peyton (W)	Died November 11, 1845	Edwin H. Ewing (W)	Seated January 2, 1846
Virginia 11th	William Taylor (D)	Died January 17, 1846	James McDowell (D)	Seated March 6, 1846
Florida At-large	Edward C. Cabell (W)	Lost contested election January 24, 1846	William H. Brockenbrough (D)	Seated January 24, 1846
Mississippi At-large	Jefferson Davis (D)	Resigned some time in June, 1846 in order to take part in the Mexican War	Henry T. Ellett (D)	Seated January 26, 1847
New York 12th	Richard P. Herrick (W)	Died June 20, 1846	Thomas C. Ripley (W)	Seated December 17, 1846
Arkansas At-large	Archibald Yell (D)	Resigned July 1, 1846, in order to take part in the Mexican War	Thomas W. Newton (W)	Seated February 6, 1847
Missouri At-large	Sterling Price (D)	Resigned August 12, 1846, in order to take part in the Mexican War	William McDaniel (D)	Seated December 7, 1846
Alabama 3rd	William L. Yancey (D)	Resigned September 1, 1846	James L. Cottrell (D)	Seated December 7, 1846
Alabama 7th	Felix G. McConnell (D)	Died September 10, 1846	Franklin W. Bowdon (D)	Seated December 7, 1846
Iowa Territory At-large	Augustus C. Dodge (D)	Territory was dissolved after Iowa was admitted to the Union December 28, 1846		
Iowa At-large	Iowa admitted into the Union December 28, 1846		S. Clinton Hastings (D)	Seated December 28, 1846
Iowa At-large	Iowa admitted into the Union December 28, 1846		Shepherd Leffler (D)	Seated December 28, 1846
Illinois 7th	Edward D. Baker (W)	Resigned January 15, 1847, in order to take part in the Mexican War	John Henry (W)	Seated February 5, 1847
Illinois 5th	Stephen A. Douglas (D)	Resigned March 3, 1847, at close of congress after being elected to the US Senate	Vacant	Not filled this term

== Committees ==
Lists of committees and their party leaders.

=== Senate ===
- Agriculture (Chairman: Daniel Sturgeon)
- Audit and Control the Contingent Expenses of the Senate (Chairman: Jesse Speight)
- Charges of Corruption Contained in the Daily Times (Select)
- Claims (Chairman: Isaac S. Pennybacker)
- Commerce (Chairman: William Haywood then John Adams Dix)
- Distributing Public Revenue Among the States (Select)
- District of Columbia (Chairman: William Haywood then Simon Cameron)
- Finance (Chairman: John C. Calhoun then Dixon H. Lewis)
- Foreign Relations (Chairman: William Allen then Ambrose H. Sevier)
- French Spoilations (Select) (Chairman: Daniel Webster)
- Indian Affairs (Chairman: Ambrose H. Sevier then Arthur P. Bagby)
- International Copyright Law (Select) (Chairman: Lewis Cass)
- Judiciary (Chairman: Chester Ashley)
- Manufactures (Chairman: Daniel S. Dickinson)
- Memorial on W.T.G. Morton (Select)
- Memphis Convention (Select) (Chairman: John C. Calhoun)
- Military Affairs (Chairman: Thomas H. Benton)
- Militia (Chairman: David R. Atchison)
- Naval Affairs (Chairman: John Fairfield)
- Ordnance and War Ships (Select)
- Patents and the Patent Office (Chairman: Simon Cameron then Walter Colquitt)
- Pensions (Chairman: Henry Johnson)
- Post Office and Post Roads (Chairman: John M. Niles)
- Printing (Chairman: Charles G. Atherton)
- Private Land Claims (Chairman: David Levy Yulee)
- Public Buildings and Grounds (Chairman: Simon Cameron)
- Public Lands (Chairman: Sidney Breese)
- Retrenchment (Chairman: Dixon H. Lewis)
- Revolutionary Claims (Chairman: Thomas Clayton)
- Roads and Canals (Chairman: Edward A. Hannegan)
- Tariff Regulation (Select)
- Territories (Chairman: James Westcott)
- Smithsonian Institution (Select) (Chairman: John Adams Dix)
- Whole

=== House of Representatives ===
- Accounts (Chairman: Daniel P. King)
- Agriculture (Chairman: Joseph H. Anderson)
- Claims (Chairman: John Reeves Jones Daniel)
- Commerce (Chairman: Robert McClelland)
- District of Columbia (Chairman: Robert M.T. Hunter)
- Elections (Chairman: Hannibal Hamlin)
- Engraving (Chairman: Jacob S. Yost)
- Expenditures in the Navy Department (Chairman: John F. Collin)
- Expenditures in the Post Office Department (Chairman: John H. Harmanson)
- Expenditures in the State Department (Chairman: Stephen Strong)
- Expenditures in the Treasury Department (Chairman: John F. Scammon)
- Expenditures in the War Department (Chairman: Owen D. Leib)
- Expenditures on Public Buildings (Chairman: Orlando B. Ficklin)
- Foreign Affairs (Chairman: Charles J. Ingersoll)
- Indian Affairs (Chairman: John A. McClernand)
- Invalid Pensions (Chairman: Preston King)
- Judiciary (Chairman: George O. Rathbun)
- Manufactures (Chairman: John Quincy Adams)
- Mileage (Chairman: John P. Martin)
- Military Affairs (Chairman: Hugh A. Haralson)
- Militia (Chairman: James A. Black)
- Naval Affairs (Chairman: Isaac E. Holmes)
- Patents (Chairman: Thomas J. Henley)
- Post Office and Post Roads (Chairman: George W. Hopkins)
- Private Land Claims (Chairman: James B. Bowlin)
- Public Buildings and Grounds (Chairman: Orlando B. Ficklin)
- Public Expenditures (Chairman: Robert P. Dunlap)
- Public Lands (Chairman: John A. McClernand)
- Revisal and Unfinished Business (Chairman: Cullen Sawtelle)
- Revolutionary Claims (Chairman: Joseph Johnson)
- Revolutionary Pensions (Chairman: Richard Brodhead)
- Roads and Canals (Chairman: Robert Smith)
- Rules (Select)
- Standards of Official Conduct
- Territories (Chairman: Stephen A. Douglas)
- Ways and Means (Chairman: James I. McKay)
- Whole

=== Joint committees ===
- Enrolled Bills (Chairman: Sen. Jesse D. Bright)
- The Library (Chairman: N/A)
- Printing (Chairman: N/A)
- Smithsonian Bequest

== Employees ==
- Librarian of Congress: John Silva Meehan

=== Senate ===
- Chaplain: Septimus Tustin (Presbyterian), until December 16, 1846
  - Henry Slicer (Methodist), elected December 16, 1846
- Secretary: Asbury Dickins
- Sergeant at Arms: Edward Dyer, died September 8, 1845
  - Robert Beale, elected December 9, 1845

=== House of Representatives ===
- Chaplain: William H. Milburn (Methodist), elected December 3, 1845
  - William T.S. Sprole (Presbyterian), elected December 7, 1846
- Clerk: Benjamin B. French
- Doorkeeper: Cornelius C. Whitney, elected December 3, 1845
- Postmaster: John M. Johnson
- Sergeant at Arms: Newton Lane

== See also ==
- 1844 United States elections (elections leading to this Congress)
  - 1844 United States presidential election
  - 1844–45 United States Senate elections
  - 1844–45 United States House of Representatives elections
- 1846 United States elections (elections during this Congress, leading to the next Congress)
  - 1846–47 United States Senate elections
  - 1846–47 United States House of Representatives elections
