= 1846–47 United States Senate elections =

- Various dates
- Class 2

19 of the 58 seats in the United States Senate (with special elections) 30 seats needed for a majority
	Majority party	Minority party
Party	Democratic	Whig
Last election	35 seats	24 seats
Seats before	33	23
Seats won	10	7
Seats after	35	19
Seat change	▲2	▼4
Seats up	8	10
	Third party	Fourth party
Party	Liberty	Independent Democratic
Last election	New party	0
Seats before	1	0
Seats won	0	1
Seats after	0	1
Seat change	▼1	▲1
Seats up	1	0
- Results: Democratic gain Democratic hold Independent Democratic gain Whig hold Legislature failed to elect
Majority Party before election
Democratic
Elected Majority Party
Democratic

The 1846–47 United States Senate elections were held on various dates in various states. As these U.S. Senate elections were prior to the ratification of the Seventeenth Amendment in 1913, senators were chosen by state legislatures. Senators were elected over a wide range of time throughout 1846 and 1847, and a seat may have been filled months late or remained vacant due to legislative deadlock. In these elections, terms were up for the senators in Class 2.

The Democratic Party gained four seats in the United States Senate.

== Results ==
Senate party division, 30th Congress (1847–1849)

- Majority party: Democratic (34–38)
- Minority party: Whig (20–21)
- Other parties: Independent Democratic (1)
- Total seats: 58–60

== Change in composition ==
=== Before the elections ===
After the February 1846 elections in Texas.

		D_{1}	D_{2}	D_{3}	D_{4}	D_{5}	D_{6}	D_{7}	D_{8}
D_{18}	D_{17}	D_{16}	D_{15}	D_{14}	D_{13}	D_{12}	D_{11}	D_{10}	D_{9}
D_{19}	D_{20}	D_{21}	D_{22}	D_{23}	D_{24}	D_{25} Ala. Ran	D_{26} Ark. Ran	D_{27} S.C. Ran	D_{28} Tex. Ran
Majority →									D_{29} N.H. Ran
W_{19} Va. Ran	W_{20} Del. Unknown	W_{21} Ky. Unknown	W_{22} Mich. Retired	W_{23} Tenn. Retired	W_{24} La. Died	V_{1}	D_{31} Ill. Retired	D_{30} Miss. Unknown	D_{29} N.H. Ran
W_{18} R.I. Ran	W_{17} N.C. Ran	W_{16} N.J. Ran	W_{15} Mass. Ran	W_{14} Maine. Ran	W_{13} Ga. Ran	W_{12}	W_{11}	W_{10}	W_{9}
		W_{1}	W_{2}	W_{3}	W_{4}	W_{5}	W_{6}	W_{7}	W_{8}

=== As a result of the regular elections ===
	V_{3} Iowa; New state	D_{1}	D_{2}	D_{3}	D_{4}	D_{5}	D_{6}	D_{7}	D_{8}
D_{18}	D_{17}	D_{16}	D_{15}	D_{14}	D_{13}	D_{12}	D_{11}	D_{10}	D_{9}
D_{19}	D_{20}	D_{21}	D_{22}	D_{23}	D_{24}	D_{25} Ala. Appointee elected	D_{26} Ark. Re-elected	D_{27} S.C. Re-elected	D_{28} Tex. Re-elected
Majority →									D_{29} Ill. Hold
W_{19} R.I. Hold	V_{1} Tenn. W Loss	V_{2}	ID_{1} N.H. Gain	D_{34} Va. Gain	D_{33} Mich. Gain	D_{32} Maine. Hold	D_{31} Miss. Hold	D_{30} La. Hold	D_{29} Ill. Hold
W_{18} Ky. Hold	W_{17} Del. Hold	W_{16} N.C. Re-elected	W_{15} N.J. Re-elected	W_{14} Mass. Re-elected	W_{13} Ga. Re-elected	W_{12}	W_{11}	W_{10}	W_{9}
	V_{4} Iowa; New state	W_{1}	W_{2}	W_{3}	W_{4}	W_{5}	W_{6}	W_{7}	W_{8}

=== As a result of the special elections ===
	V_{2} Iowa	D_{1}	D_{2}	D_{3}	D_{4}	D_{5}	D_{6}	D_{7}	D_{8}
D_{18}	D_{17}	D_{16}	D_{15}	D_{14}	D_{13}	D_{12}	D_{11}	D_{10}	D_{9}
D_{19}	D_{20}	D_{21}	D_{22}	D_{23}	D_{24} Va. (sp); Hold	D_{25}	D_{26}	D_{27}	D_{28}
Majority →									D_{29}
W_{19}	W_{20} Tenn. Gain	W_{21} N.C. (sp); Gain	ID_{1}	D_{34}	D_{33}	D_{32}	D_{31}	D_{30}	D_{29}
W_{18}	W_{17}	W_{16}	W_{15}	W_{14}	W_{13}	W_{12}	W_{11}	W_{10}	W_{9}
	V_{3} Iowa	W_{1}	W_{2}	W_{3}	W_{4}	W_{5}	W_{6}	W_{7}	W_{8}

Key:

D_{#}	Democratic
ID_{#}	Independent Democratic
W_{#}	Whig
V_{#}	Vacant

== Race summaries ==
=== Special elections during the 29th Congress ===
In these special elections, the winners were seated during 1846 or in 1847 before March 4; ordered by election date.

State	Incumbent			Results	Candidates
State	Senator	Party	Electoral history	Results	Candidates
Mississippi (Class 2)	Joseph W. Chalmers	Democratic	1845 (appointed)	Interim appointee elected January 10, 1846.	▌ ✓ Joseph W. Chalmers (Democratic); [data missing]
Texas (Class 1)	None (new state)			Texas was admitted to the Union December 29, 1845. Senator elected February 21, 1846. Democratic gain.	▌ ✓ Thomas Rusk (Democratic); [data missing]
Texas (Class 2)	None (new state)			Texas was admitted to the Union December 29, 1845. Senator elected February 21, 1846. Democratic gain.	▌ ✓ Sam Houston (Democratic); [data missing]
New Hampshire (Class 2)	Benning W. Jenness	Democratic	1845 (appointed)	Appointee lost election to finish the term. New senator elected June 13, 1846. Liberty gain. Winner was not elected to the next term; see below.	▌ ✓ Joseph Cilley (Liberty); ▌Benning W. Jenness (Democratic); [data missing]
North Carolina (Class 3)	William H. Haywood Jr.	Democratic	1843	Incumbent resigned July 25, 1846 rather than disobey instructions from the N.C. General Assembly. New senator elected November 25, 1846. Whig gain.	▌ ✓ George E. Badger (Whig); [data missing]
Louisiana (Class 2)	Alexander Barrow	Whig	1840	Incumbent died December 29, 1846. New senator elected January 21, 1847. Democratic gain. Winner was not elected to the next term; see below.	▌ ✓ Pierre Soulé (Democratic); [data missing]
Virginia (Class 1)	Isaac S. Pennybacker	Democratic	1845 (special)	Incumbent died January 12, 1847. New senator elected January 21, 1847. Democratic hold.	▌ ✓ James M. Mason (Democratic); [data missing]
Iowa (Class 2)	None (new state)			Iowa was admitted to the Union December 28, 1846. Legislature failed to elect due to a three-way split preventing any candidate from earning the required number of 30 legislators' votes. Seats remained vacant until December 7, 1848.	[data missing]
Iowa (Class 3)	None (new state)			Iowa was admitted to the Union December 28, 1846. Legislature failed to elect due to a three-way split preventing any candidate from earning the required number of 30 legislators' votes. Seats remained vacant until December 7, 1848.	[data missing]

=== Races leading to the 30th Congress ===
In these regular elections, the winners were elected for the term beginning March 4, 1847; ordered by state.

All of the elections involved the Class 2 seats.

State	Incumbent			Results	Candidates
State	Senator	Party	Electoral history	Results	Candidates
Alabama	Dixon Hall Lewis	Democratic	1844 (appointed)	Incumbent elected to full term in 1847.	▌ ✓ Dixon Hall Lewis (Democratic); [data missing]
Arkansas	Chester Ashley	Democratic	1844 (special)	Incumbent re-elected in 1846.	▌ ✓ Chester Ashley (Democratic); [data missing]
Delaware	Thomas Clayton	Whig	1837 (special); 1841	Incumbent lost re-election or retired. Winner elected in 1846 or 1847. Whig hold.	▌ ✓ Presley Spruance (Whig); [data missing]
Georgia	John M. Berrien	Whig	1825; 1829 (resigned); 1840; 1845 (resigned); 1845 (special)	Incumbent re-elected in 1846.	▌ ✓ John M. Berrien (Whig); [data missing]
Illinois	James Semple	Democratic	1843 (appointed) ? (special)	Incumbent retired. New senator elected in 1846. Democratic hold.	▌ ✓ Stephen A. Douglas (Democratic); [data missing]
Kentucky	James T. Morehead	Whig	1841	Incumbent retired or lost re-election. New senator elected in 1846 or 1847. Whig hold.	▌ ✓ Joseph R. Underwood (Whig); [data missing]
Louisiana	Pierre Soulé	Democratic	1847 (special)	Incumbent retired or lost re-election. New senator elected in 1847. Democratic hold.	▌ ✓ Solomon W. Downs (Democratic); [data missing]
Maine	George Evans	Whig	1840	Incumbent lost re-election. New senator elected in 1846. Democratic gain.	▌ ✓ James W. Bradbury (Democratic); ▌George Evans (Whig); [data missing]
Massachusetts	John Davis	Whig	1835; 1841 (resigned); 1845 (special)	Incumbent re-elected in 1847.	▌ ✓ John Davis (Whig); [data missing]
Michigan	William Woodbridge	Whig	1841	Incumbent retired. New senator elected in February 1847. Democratic gain.	▌ ✓ Alpheus Felch (Democratic); [data missing]
Mississippi	Joseph W. Chalmers	Democratic	1845 (appointed) ? (special)	Incumbent lost re-election or retired. New senator elected in 1846 or 1847. Democratic hold.	▌ ✓ Henry S. Foote (Democratic); [data missing]
New Hampshire	Joseph Cilley	Liberty	1846	Incumbent lost re-election. New senator elected in 1846. Independent Democratic gain.	▌ ✓ John P. Hale (Independent Democratic); ▌Joseph Cilley (Liberty); [data missing]
New Jersey	Jacob W. Miller	Whig	1841	Incumbent re-elected in 1846.	▌ ✓ Jacob W. Miller (Whig); [data missing]
North Carolina	Willie Mangum	Whig	1840 (special); 1841	Incumbent re-elected in 1847.	▌ ✓ Willie Mangum (Whig); [data missing]
Rhode Island	James F. Simmons	Whig	1841	Incumbent lost re-election. New member elected in 1846 or 1847. Whig hold.	▌ ✓ John Hopkins Clarke (Whig); ▌James F. Simmons (Whig); [data missing]
South Carolina	John C. Calhoun	Democratic	1832 (special); 1834; 1840; 1843 (resigned); 1845 (special)	Incumbent re-elected in 1846.	▌ ✓ John C. Calhoun (Democratic); [data missing]
Tennessee	Spencer Jarnagin	Whig	1843 (special)	Incumbent retired. Legislature failed to elect. Whig loss.	[data missing]
Texas	Sam Houston	Democratic	1846	Incumbent re-elected in 1847	▌ ✓ Sam Houston (Democratic); [data missing]
Virginia	William S. Archer	Whig	1840	Incumbent lost re-election. New senator elected in 1846. Democratic gain.	▌ ✓ Robert M. T. Hunter (Democratic); ▌William S. Archer (Whig); [data missing]

=== Special elections during the 30th Congress ===
In this special election, the winner was elected in 1847 after March 4.

State	Incumbent			Results	Candidates
State	Senator	Party	Electoral history	Results	Candidates
Tennessee (Class 2)	Vacant			Legislature had earlier failed to elect. New senator elected November 22, 1847. Whig gain.	▌ ✓ John Bell (Whig); [data missing]

== Iowa ==
Iowa became a state in December 1846, but did not elect its senators until December 1848.

== Louisiana ==
Alexander Barrow (W) died December 29, 1846. Pierre Soulé (D) was elected January 21, 1847 just to finish the term. Solomon W. Downs (D) was elected to the next term.

== New Hampshire ==
Democratic appointee Benning W. Jenness lost the June 13, 1846 election to finish the term and the election the same day to the next term. Joseph Cilley (Liberty) was elected to finish the term, but lost the election to the next term. John P. Hale (Independent Democratic) was elected to the next term and would later become a Free Soiler.

== Virginia ==
William S. Archer (W) lost re-election to Democrat Robert M. T. Hunter.

== Virginia (special) ==
Isaac S. Pennybacker (D), who was not up for election, died January 12, 1847. James Murray Mason (D) was elected January 21, 1847.

== See also ==
- 1846 United States elections
  - 1846–47 United States House of Representatives elections
- 29th United States Congress
- 30th United States Congress
