= Joseph Cilley =

Joseph Cilley may refer to:

- Joseph Cilley (state senator) (1734–1799), soldier and New Hampshire state senator
- Joseph Cilley (senator) (1791–1887), his grandson, U.S. senator
