= 1851 United States Senate election in Pennsylvania =

- January 14, 1851
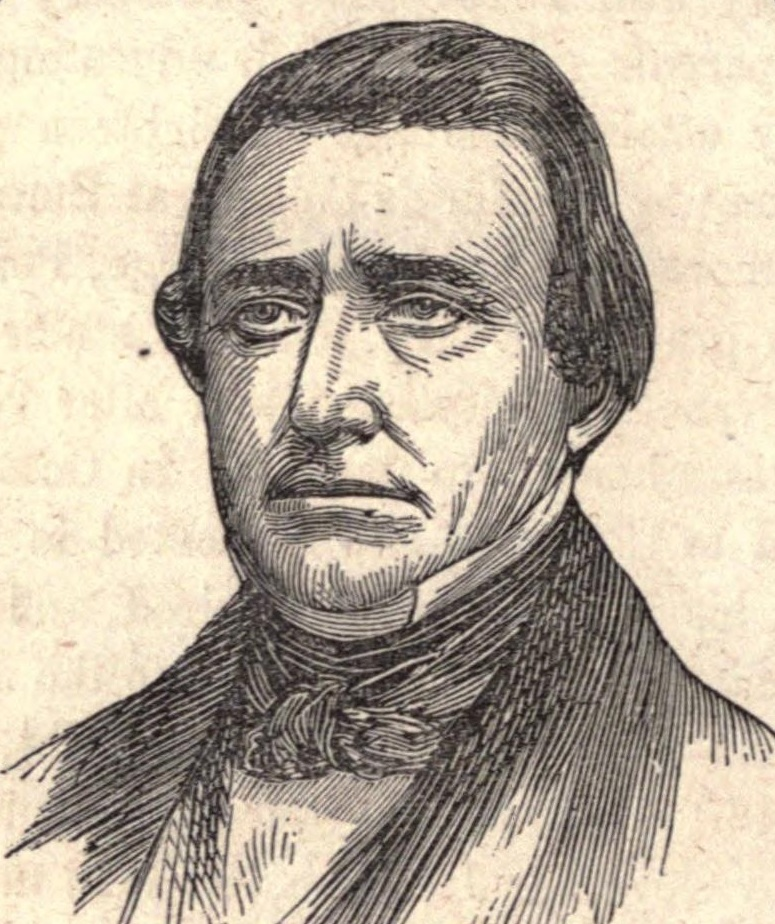

Nominee	Richard Brodhead	Andrew W. Loomis	Alexander Brown
Party	Democratic	Whig	Whig
Electoral vote	76	12	11
Percentage	57.1%	9.0%	8.3%
Senator before election
Daniel Sturgeon
Democratic
Elected Senator
Richard Brodhead
Democratic

The 1851 United States Senate election in Pennsylvania was held on January 14, 1851. Richard Brodhead was elected by the Pennsylvania General Assembly to the United States Senate.

== Results ==
The Pennsylvania General Assembly, consisting of the House of Representatives and the Senate, convened on January 14, 1851, to elect a senator to serve the term beginning on March 4, 1851. The results of the vote of both houses combined are as follows:

State legislature results
Party	Candidate	Votes	%
Democratic	Richard Brodhead	76	57.14
Whig	Andrew W. Loomis	12	9.02
Whig	Alexander Brown	11	8.27
Whig	Samuel Purviance	4	3.01
Whig	Samuel Calvin	4	3.01
Whig	Thomas M. T. McKennan	4	3.01
Whig	John Sergeant	4	3.01
Whig	George Chambers	3	2.26
Whig	John Dickey	2	1.50
Whig	James Pollock	2	1.50
Whig	John Allison	1	0.75
Whig	William Darlington	1	0.75
Whig	Townsend Haines	1	0.75
Whig	Charles Pitman	1	0.75
Whig	Daniel M. Smyser	1	0.75
Whig	Thomas White	1	0.75
Whig	David Wilmot	1	0.75
N/A	Not voting	3	2.26
Totals		133	100.00%

== See also ==
- 1850–51 United States Senate elections

Preceded by 1845	Pennsylvania U.S. Senate election (Class I); 1851	Succeeded by 1857
