= Joseph Chalmers =

Joseph Chalmers may refer to:

- Joseph W. Chalmers (1806–1853), American politician
- Joe Chalmers (born 1994), Scottish footballer
