= Anthony Kennedy (Maryland politician) =

American politician (1810–1892)

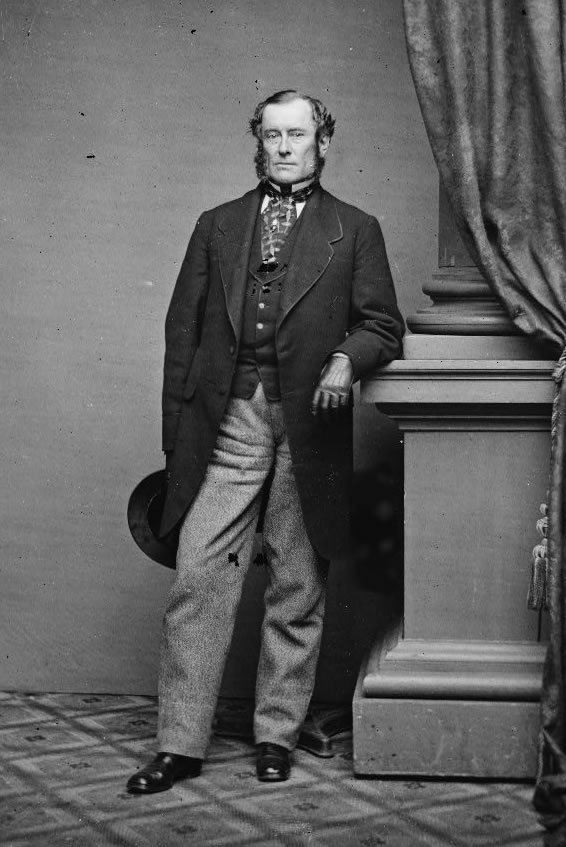

United States Senator from Maryland
- In office March 4, 1857 – March 3, 1863
- Preceded by: Thomas Pratt
- Succeeded by: Reverdy Johnson

Member of the Maryland House of Delegates from Baltimore City
- In office January 2, 1856 – March 4, 1857

Member of the Virginia House of Delegates from Jefferson County
- In office December 6, 1841 – December 5, 1842 Serving with John Moler
- Preceded by: George B. Stephenson
- Succeeded by: William C. Worthington
- In office December 2, 1839 – December 1, 1840 Serving with William C. Worthington
- Preceded by: George Reynolds
- Succeeded by: George B. Stephenson

Personal details
- Born: December 21, 1810 Baltimore, Maryland, U.S.
- Died: July 31, 1892 (aged 81) Annapolis, Maryland, U.S.
- Resting place: Green Mount Cemetery
- Party: Whig, Know Nothing
- Spouse: Sarah Stephena Dandridge (m. 1832; died 1846)
- Relations: John P. Kennedy (brother)
- Children: 3

Anthony Kennedy (December 21, 1810 – July 31, 1892) was a United States Senator from Maryland, serving from 1857 to 1863. He was the brother of United States Secretary of the Navy John P. Kennedy.

== Early life ==
Kennedy was born in Baltimore, Maryland, to merchant John Kennedy (1769–1836) and Anne Clayton (née Pendleton) Kennedy (1776–1854). His parents sent him to Charles Town, Virginia, (now West Virginia) in 1821, where he attended the Jefferson Academy.

== Career ==
He studied law and also engaged in agricultural pursuits. He was a member of the Virginia House of Delegates from 1839 to 1843 and a magistrate on the bench of the Jefferson County Court in Virginia for ten years.

Kennedy was an unsuccessful Whig candidate for election in 1844 to the Twenty-ninth Congress and declined the offer of President Millard Fillmore to be consul to Havana, Cuba, in 1850. He returned to Baltimore in 1851 and was elected as a member of the Maryland House of Delegates in 1856.

Kennedy was elected by the American Party to the United States Senate and served from 1857 to 1863. He served as a delegate to the State constitutional convention in 1867, afterwards retiring from active political life.

== Personal life ==
On 1832, Kennedy was married to Sarah Stephena Dandridge (1811–1846). They lived on his farm near Ellicott City, Maryland. Together, they were the parents of three children:

- Stephen Dandridge Kennedy (1834–1914), who married Frances Howell, a daughter of Lewis Howell and Margaret (née Armistead) Howell, in 1863. After her death, he married his cousin Mary Selden, a daughter of John D. Selden and Ann Rebecca (née Kennedy) Selden, in 1869.
- Philip Pendleton Kennedy, who died young.
- Agnes Spottiswoode Kennedy (1838–1907), who married Hall Harrison, a son of Rev. Hugh Thompson Harrison, in 1876.

Kennedy died in Annapolis, Maryland on July 31, 1892. He is interred in Greenmount Cemetery in Baltimore, Maryland.

=== Descendants ===
Through his son Stephen's first marriage, he was the grandfather of Frances Howell Hughes Kennedy, who married William Maurice Manly. From his son Stephen's second marriage, he was a grandfather of four more, including Anthony Kennedy (b. 1873), Mary (née Kennedy) Page (1875–1936), Margaret Hughes (née Kennedy) Cox (1877–1934), Agnes Gray (née Kennedy) Mason (1881–1960).

U.S. Senate
| Preceded by Thomas Pratt | U.S. senator (Class 1) from Maryland; March 4, 1857 – March 3, 1863; Served alongside: James A. Pearce and Thomas Holliday Hicks | Succeeded by Reverdy Johnson |
