= 1832–33 United States Senate election in Pennsylvania =

The 1832–33 United States Senate election in Pennsylvania was held on eleven separate dates from December 1832 to December 1833. On December 7, 1833, Samuel McKean was elected by the Pennsylvania General Assembly to the United States Senate.

== Results ==
The Pennsylvania General Assembly, consisting of the House of Representatives and the Senate, convened on December 11, 1832, for the regularly scheduled Senate election for the term beginning on March 4, 1833. A total of thirty-six ballots were recorded. Ballots 1-17 were recorded on four separate dates (11th, 12th, 13th, 15th) in December 1832. Ballots 18-21 were recorded on two separate dates (9th and 10th) in January 1833. Ballots 22-29 were recorded on two separate dates (19th and 20th) in February 1833. The thirtieth ballot was recorded on March 12, 1833, followed by three additional ballots on April 2. Following the thirty-third ballot on April 2, the election convention adjourned sine die without electing a Senator.

Upon the expiration of incumbent George M. Dallas' term on March 4, 1833, the seat was vacated. It was vacant until the election convention of the General Assembly re-convened on December 7, 1833, and elected Democrat Samuel McKean to the seat after three additional ballots. The results of the third and final ballot (thirty-sixth ballot in total) of both houses combined during the December 7th session are as follows:

State Legislature Results
Party	Candidate	Votes	%
Democratic	Samuel McKean	74	55.64
Anti-Masonic	William Clark	28	21.05
Democratic	Thomas H. Crawford	19	14.29
Democratic	James Buchanan	5	3.76
National Republican	Garrick Mallery	3	2.26
Democratic	Adam King	1	0.75
N/A	Not voting	3	2.26
Totals		133	100.00%

== See also ==
- 1832–33 United States Senate elections

Preceded by 1831	Pennsylvania U.S. Senate election (Class I); 1832-33	Succeeded by 1840
