= Richard Brodhead =

American lawyer and politician

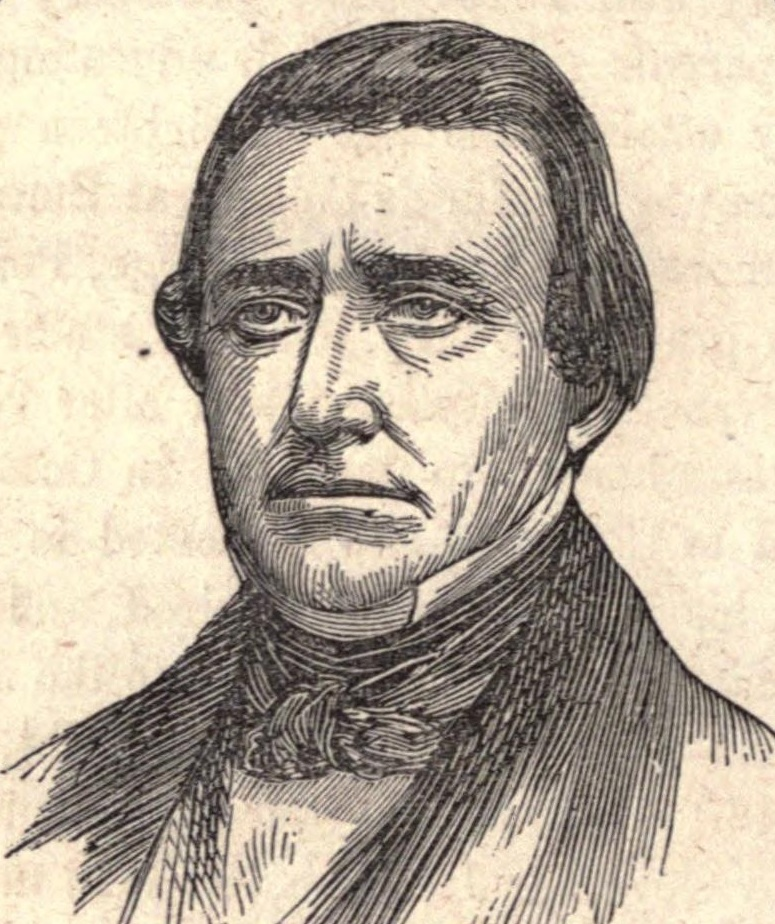
- From 1856's Portraits of United States Senators with a Biographical Sketch of Each

United States Senator from Pennsylvania
- In office March 4, 1851 – March 3, 1857
- Preceded by: Daniel Sturgeon
- Succeeded by: Simon Cameron

Member of the U.S. House of Representatives from Pennsylvania's 10th district
- In office March 4, 1843 – March 3, 1849
- Preceded by: William Simonton
- Succeeded by: Milo M. Dimmick

Member of the Pennsylvania House of Representatives
- In office 1837-1839

Personal details
- Born: January 5, 1811 Lehman Township, Pennsylvania, US
- Died: September 16, 1863 (aged 52) Easton, Pennsylvania, US
- Party: Democratic

Richard Brodhead (January 5, 1811 – September 16, 1863) was an American lawyer and politician from Easton, Pennsylvania. He represented Pennsylvania in both the U.S. House (1843 to 1849) and Senate (1851 to 1857).

He was the father of U.S. Representative Jefferson Davis Brodhead, who also represented Pennsylvania.

== Biography ==
Richard Brodhead was born in Lehman Township, Pennsylvania, the son of Hannah (Drake) and Richard Brodhead, Sr. Brodhead moved to Easton, Pennsylvania in 1830. He studied law, was admitted to the bar in 1836 and commenced practice in Easton. He was a member of the Pennsylvania State House of Representatives from 1837 to 1839. He was appointed treasurer of Northampton County, Pennsylvania in 1841. His wife was Mary Jane Davis Bradford, a niece of Jefferson Davis of Mississippi.

=== Political career ===
Brodhead was elected as a Democrat to the Twenty-eighth, Twenty-ninth, and Thirtieth Congresses. He served as chairman of the United States House Committee on Revolutionary Pensions during the Twenty-ninth Congress. He was not a candidate for renomination in 1848.

Brodhead was elected as a Democrat to the United States Senate. He served as chairman of the United States Senate Committee on Claims during the Thirty-second and Thirty-third Congresses. and the United States Senate Committee on Revolutionary Claims during Thirty-second Congress. He died in Easton in 1863. He is interred in the Easton Cemetery.

== Legacy ==
He was the most recent resident of the Lehigh Valley area to serve as United States Senator from Pennsylvania until the election of Pat Toomey in 2010.

U.S. House of Representatives
Preceded by William Simonton	Member of the U.S. House of Representatives from Pennsylvania's 10th congressional district 1843–1849	Succeeded by Milo M. Dimmick
U.S. Senate
Preceded by Daniel Sturgeon	U.S. senator (Class 1) from Pennsylvania; 1851–1857; Served alongside: James Cooper, William Bigler	Succeeded by Simon Cameron
