= 1845 United States Senate election in Pennsylvania =

The 1845 United States Senate election in Pennsylvania was held on January 14, 1845. Incumbent Daniel Sturgeon was re-elected by the Pennsylvania General Assembly to the United States Senate.

== Results ==
The Pennsylvania General Assembly, consisting of the House of Representatives and the Senate, convened on January 14, 1845, to elect a senator to serve the term beginning on March 4, 1845. The results of the vote of both houses combined are as follows:

State legislature results
Party	Candidate	Votes	%
Democratic	Daniel Sturgeon (inc.)	72	54.14
Whig	James Cooper	49	36.84
Know Nothing	John Ashmead	5	3.76
Know Nothing	E. W. Keyser	2	1.50
Know Nothing	Jacob Broom	1	0.75
Know Nothing	E. C. Reigert	1	0.75
Whig	John Sergeant	1	0.75
N/A	Not voting	2	1.50
Totals		133	100.00%

== See also ==
- 1844–45 United States Senate elections
- 1845 United States Senate special election in Pennsylvania

Preceded by 1840	Pennsylvania U.S. Senate election (Class I); 1845	Succeeded by 1851
