= David Stewart (Maryland politician) =

U.S. Senator from Maryland (1800–1858)

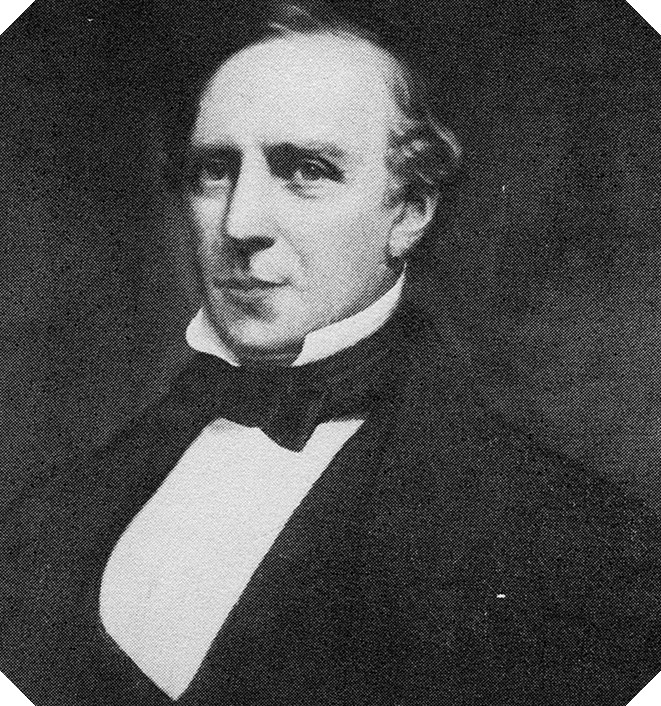
- Oil on canvas portrait by an unknown artist, circa 1850s. Reproduced in 1978's The Green Spring Valley by Dawn F. Thomas and Robert William Barnes.

United States Senator from Maryland
- In office December 6, 1849 – January 12, 1850
- Appointed by: Philip Francis Thomas
- Preceded by: Reverdy Johnson
- Succeeded by: Thomas Pratt

Member of the Maryland Senate from Baltimore
- In office 1838–1840
- Preceded by: None (district established)
- Succeeded by: Benjamin Chew Howard

Personal details
- Born: September 13, 1800 Baltimore, Maryland, US
- Died: January 5, 1858 (aged 57) Baltimore, Maryland, US
- Resting place: "Old Westminster" Burying Ground, Baltimore, Maryland
- Party: Democratic-Republican; National Republican; Whig; Democratic
- Spouse(s): Mary Adelaide Morton (m. 1825-1834, her death); Priscilla Margaretta Pinkney (m. 1836-1858, his death)
- Children: 4
- Education: Union College
- Profession: Attorney

Military service
- Allegiance: United States; Maryland
- Branch/service: Maryland Militia
- Years of service: 1820s
- Rank: Captain
- Unit: 27th Regiment
- Commands: 5th Company, 27th Regiment

David Stewart (September 13, 1800 – January 5, 1858) was an attorney and politician from Baltimore, Maryland. A Democrat, he was most notable for his service in the Maryland Senate and his brief service as an interim U.S. Senator from 1849 to 1850.

Stewart was born and raised in Baltimore, graduated from Union College in 1819, and studied law. He was admitted to the bar in 1821 and practiced in Baltimore. Stewart was active in politics, first as a Democratic-Republican, then as a National Republican and a Whig, and finally as a Democrat. As a Whig, he represented Baltimore in the Maryland Senate from 1838 to 1840. As a Democrat, in late 1849 he was appointed to temporarily fill a vacancy in the U.S. Senate, and he served until early 1850.

Stewart died in Baltimore on January 5, 1858. He was buried at "Old Westminster" Burying Ground in Baltimore.

== Early life ==
Stewart was born in Baltimore, Maryland on September 13, 1800, the only child of John Stewart and Helen West. His mother was from a prominent Philadelphia family; her father, William West, was known for supporting the Patriot cause during the American Revolution. Stewart's father was from a successful mercantile family; he died in 1802.

After completing preparatory studies, Stewart attended the College of New Jersey (now Princeton University). He graduated from Union College in 1819 and was admitted to Phi Beta Kappa. He then studied law, attained admission to the bar in 1821, and commenced practice in Baltimore. At the start of his career, Stewart also volunteered as a member of the Friendship Fire Company, in which he served as a hose man. In addition, Stewart served in the 27th Regiment of the Maryland Militia, first as a first lieutenant in the company commanded by Captain John M. Kane, and later as commander of the regiment's 5th Company with the rank of captain.

== Start of career ==
In 1822, Stewart was an unsuccessful Democratic-Republican candidate for the Maryland House of Delegates. In 1826, Stewart was selected to serve as secretary of a meeting of supporters of Democratic-Republican John Montgomery, who was running for reelection as mayor of Baltimore. In the early 1830s, Stewart was an opponent of President Andrew Jackson's policies, and was identified with the National Republican Party. He was a candidate for member of the electoral college in 1832, and National Republican Henry Clay won Maryland's electoral votes, but Stewart was not chosen as an elector.

In 1838, the Maryland Senate was reformed to allow for districts and direct election. Stewart, now identified with the Whig Party, was elected to represent the city of Baltimore in 1838 and 1839. Stewart sometimes represented slaves who sought manumission by self-purchase; this representation usually required him to negotiate terms of sale with the owners. (Note: Jones incorrectly identifies David Stewart's law partner John Stewart as David's brother. In fact, John Stewart was the son of David Stewart.) He also advocated for African Americans to be relocated to Africa as part of the colonization movement that was active in the United States in the early to mid 1800s, and was a member of Baltimore's delegation to the June 1841 state colonization convention. In 1840, Stewart campaigned for the Whig presidential ticket of William Henry Harrison and John Tyler, and was a featured speaker at a campaign rally sponsored by one of Baltimore's Tippecanoe clubs.

== Continued career ==
By 1844, Stewart had left the Whigs for the Democratic Party. In 1845, he was a member of the committee Baltimore's Democrats formed to arrange civic honors to commemorate the death of Andrew Jackson. In May 1846, Stewart took part in public meetings intended to demonstrate popular support for U.S. participation in the Mexican–American War. In June 1846, Stewart was elected second vice president of the Baltimore City Democratic Convention. In August of that year he was a vice president of the Baltimore Democratic Party meeting that passed resolutions commending Vice President George M. Dallas for voting to repeal the Tariff of 1842 and requesting that a delegation be permitted to call on him when he next visited Baltimore so they could express their appreciation in person.

In early 1848, Stewart was one of the managers of a Baltimore Democratic Party ball held to celebrate American success in the war with Mexico. In mid to late 1848, he was one of the prominent Democrats who organized the Baltimore campaign for the presidential ticket of Lewis Cass and William O. Butler. Stewart was also active in civic causes; In May 1848, he was one of the leaders of a mass public meeting held to plan and implement relief efforts for victims of a recent fire that had destroyed 60 Baltimore homes and several commercial buildings. In August 1848, was named a vice president of Baltimore's Friends of Ireland, an organization created to provide aid to the Irish people during the famine of 1845 to 1852.

In June and July 1849, Stewart was one of the Baltimore Democrats who took part in organizing and conducting honors to commemorate the death of former president James K. Polk. In December 1849, Stewart was appointed to the United States Senate to fill the vacancy caused by the resignation of Reverdy Johnson. He served from December 6, 1849 to January 12, 1850. Stewart received the Democratic nomination in the election held by the state legislature, but the legislature was controlled by the Whigs, and Whig Thomas Pratt was elected to complete the term. Stewart then resumed practicing law in Baltimore.

In January 1850, the city council appointed Stewart as one of Baltimore's members of the Baltimore and Ohio Railroad board of directors. In mid-1850, Stewart publicly supported the Compromise of 1850 and took part in Pro-Union conventions of delegates from the Whig and Democratic parties that sought to prevent the secession of slaveholding states through passage of the compromise measures. In September 1850, Stewart was a featured speaker at the Baltimore Democratic Party rally which opened that year's fall campaign. Stewart was a delegate to the Maryland Constitutional Convention of 1850–1851.

In February 1851, he was among several prominent Baltimore residents who publicly petitioned Congress for regular steamship routes between the U.S. and Liberia as part of the colonization movement. In September 1851, Stewart was a delegate to that year's state Democratic convention, which was held to nominate candidates for statewide offices in that November's elections, and he called the meeting to order as its temporary chairman. Stewart was a prominent speaker at Democratic rallies in Baltimore during October 1851, which were held prior to the elections scheduled for that November. During that month, Stewart was also named a manager of the mayoral committee created to organize a public reception for Hungarian revolutionary Lajos Kossuth, who was then visiting the United States. In December 1851, Stewart was one of the managers of a ball sponsored by the city Democratic committee which celebrated the new year and also honored Kossuth.

== Later career ==
Stewart continued to remain active in the Democratic Party, and took part in numerous organizational meetings and conventions as an officer and delegate. In 1852, he supported the Democratic presidential ticket of Franklin Pierce and William R. King and continued to advocate for implementation of the 1850 compromise. After Pierce won the November 1852 election, in December Stewart was one of the organizers of a celebratory ball sponsored by Baltimore's Democratic Party. During the October 1853 campaign for seats in the state legislature, Stewart was a featured speaker at Democratic campaign rallies in several Baltimore neighborhoods.

Stewart was one of the planners of May 1854 ceremonies held to honor former president Millard Fillmore during Fillmore's visit to Baltimore. In September 1854, Stewart took part in organizing a Democratic rally to commemorate the anniversary of the 1814 Battle of North Point, a War of 1812 action that delayed the attacking British so the Americans could prepare their defenses for the subsequent Battle of Baltimore. In October 1854, he was a featured speaker at neighborhood Democratic campaign rallies in advance of that year's November elections. In July 1855, Stewart was a delegate to the Baltimore Democratic nominating convention that chose delegates to that year's state nominating convention; he was a candidate for delegate to the state convention, but was not selected.

In March 1856, Stewart's name was in consideration when the Democrats of Maryland's 4th congressional district selected delegates to the 1856 Democratic National Convention, but he was not selected. In April 1856, Stewart took part in the city Democratic convention that chose delegates to that year's state Democratic convention, and was selected as one of the state convention delegates. In August 1856, Stewart was one of the organizers who sponsored a mass meeting of city residents opposed to the Know Nothing Party.

In September 1856, Stewart was president of the city Democratic convention that nominated Robert Clinton Wright for mayor of Baltimore; In a campaign that was marred by multiple riots, Wright lost the election to Thomas Swann, the Know Nothing candidate. In January 1857, Stewart was one of the leaders of a committee of Baltimore Democrats that organized a ball in honor of James Buchanan and John C. Breckinridge, the Democratic ticket in the 1856 United States presidential election, whose terms as president and vice president were scheduled to start on March 4.

== Death and burial ==
Stewart died in Baltimore on January 5, 1858. He was interred in the Stewart vault at the "Old Westminster" Burying Ground.

== Family ==
In 1825, Stewart married Mary Adelaide Morton. They were the parents of four children, two of whom survived to adulthood:

- John (1826-1901)
- Charles Morton (1828-1901)
- Sarah died young
- David (1833-1834)

Mary Morton Stewart died in 1834, and in 1836 Stewart married Priscilla Margaretta Pinkney (or Pinckney). Priscilla P. Stewart died in July 1884.

== Legacy ==
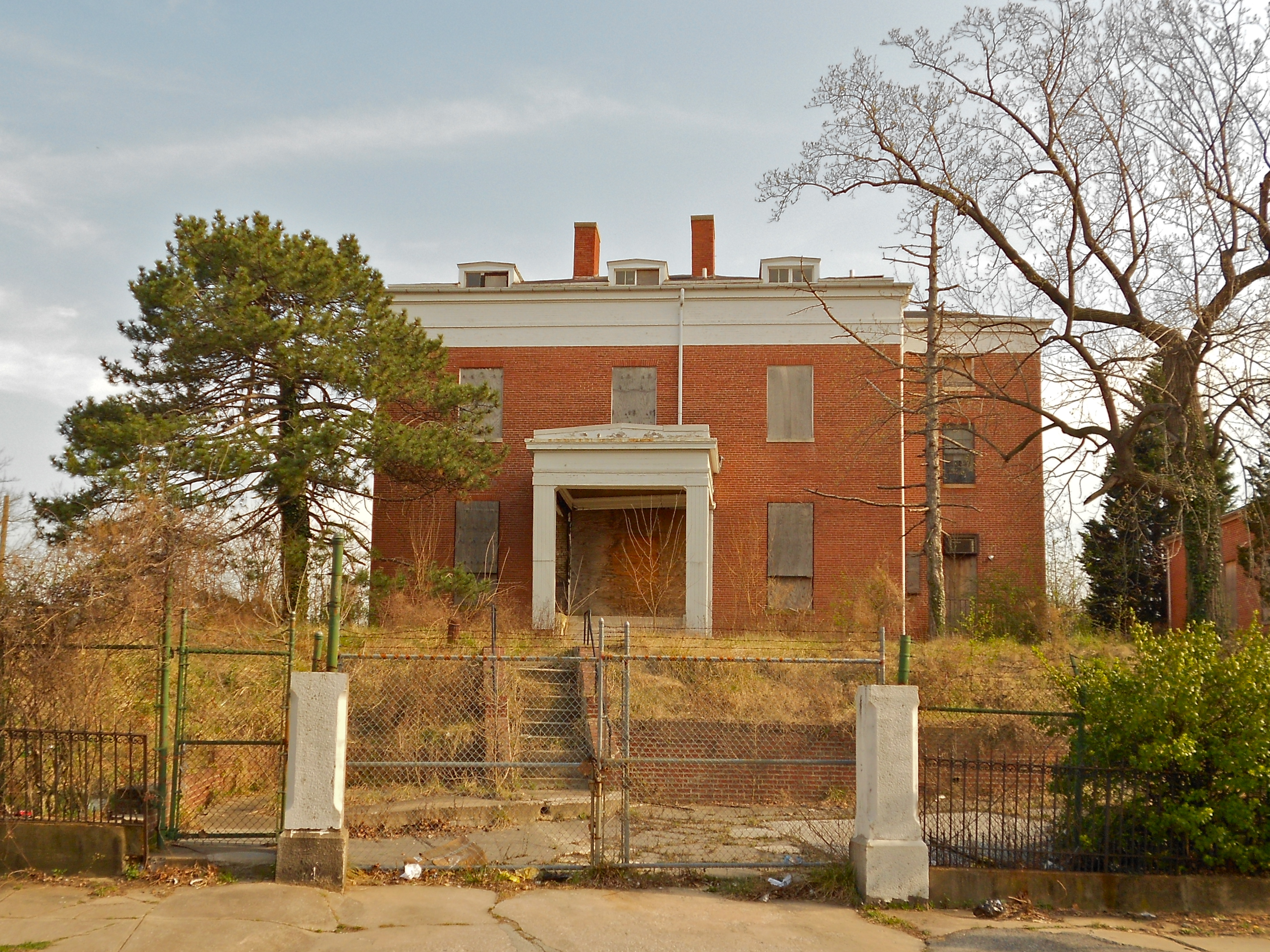
Upton, the Baltimore mansion Stewart constructed in the 1830s

Stewart constructed a mansion in the western part of Baltimore. Called Upton, it was named for a previous home that had existed on the same site, Upton Park. Stewart's Upton home was later used for several commercial purposes, including a school and a radio station. The building has been vacant since the 1950s, and is owned by the city's Department of Housing and Community Development. Upton Mansion was listed on the National Register of Historic Places in 1994.

== Sources ==
- United States Congress. "David Stewart (id: S000905)". Biographical Directory of the United States Congress.

U.S. Senate
Preceded by Reverdy Johnson	U.S. senator (Class 1) from Maryland; 1849–1850; Served alongside: James A. Pearce	Succeeded by Thomas G. Pratt
