= 1846 United States elections =

- ← 1844 1845 1846 1847 1848 → Midterm elections
- Incumbent president: ▌James K. Polk (D)
- Next Congress: 30th

Senate elections
- Overall control: Democratic hold
- Seats contested: 19 of 58 seats
- Net seat change: Democratic +2

House elections
- Overall control: Whig gain
- Seats contested: All 230 voting seats
- Net seat change: Whig +37

Elections occurred in the middle of Democratic President James Polk's term, during the Second Party System. The election took place during the Mexican–American War (1846–1848). Members of the 30th United States Congress were chosen in this election. Wisconsin joined the union during the 30th Congress. The Democrats kept control of the Senate, but lost control of the House.

In the House, the Whigs won major gains, turning a dominant Democratic majority into a narrow Whig majority.

In the Senate, Democrats picked up a moderate number of seats, building on their majority.

== See also ==
- 1846–47 United States House of Representatives elections
- 1846–47 United States Senate elections
