= United States House Committee on Engraving =

The United States House Committee on Engraving is a former committee of the United States House of Representatives which existed from 1844 to 1860.

== History ==
The committee was established as a select committee on January 11, 1844, due to concern over potential fraudulent charges in the creation of maps ordered by the 26th and 27th Congresses. After the select committee did indeed find evidence of fraud, a standing committee was proposed in March of that year. It continued as a standing committee until its jurisdiction was reassigned to the Joint Committee on Printing in 1860.

== Jurisdiction ==
The Committee on Engraving was responsible for "all drawings, maps, charts, and other papers, which may, at any time, come before the House for engraving, lithographing, or publishing in any way." The committee made recommendations to the House regarding which materials ought to be published; drew up contracts for materials ordered by the House; and oversaw the execution of the contracts.
