= Thomas Pratt (Maryland politician) =

American politician (1804–1869)

Thomas George Pratt
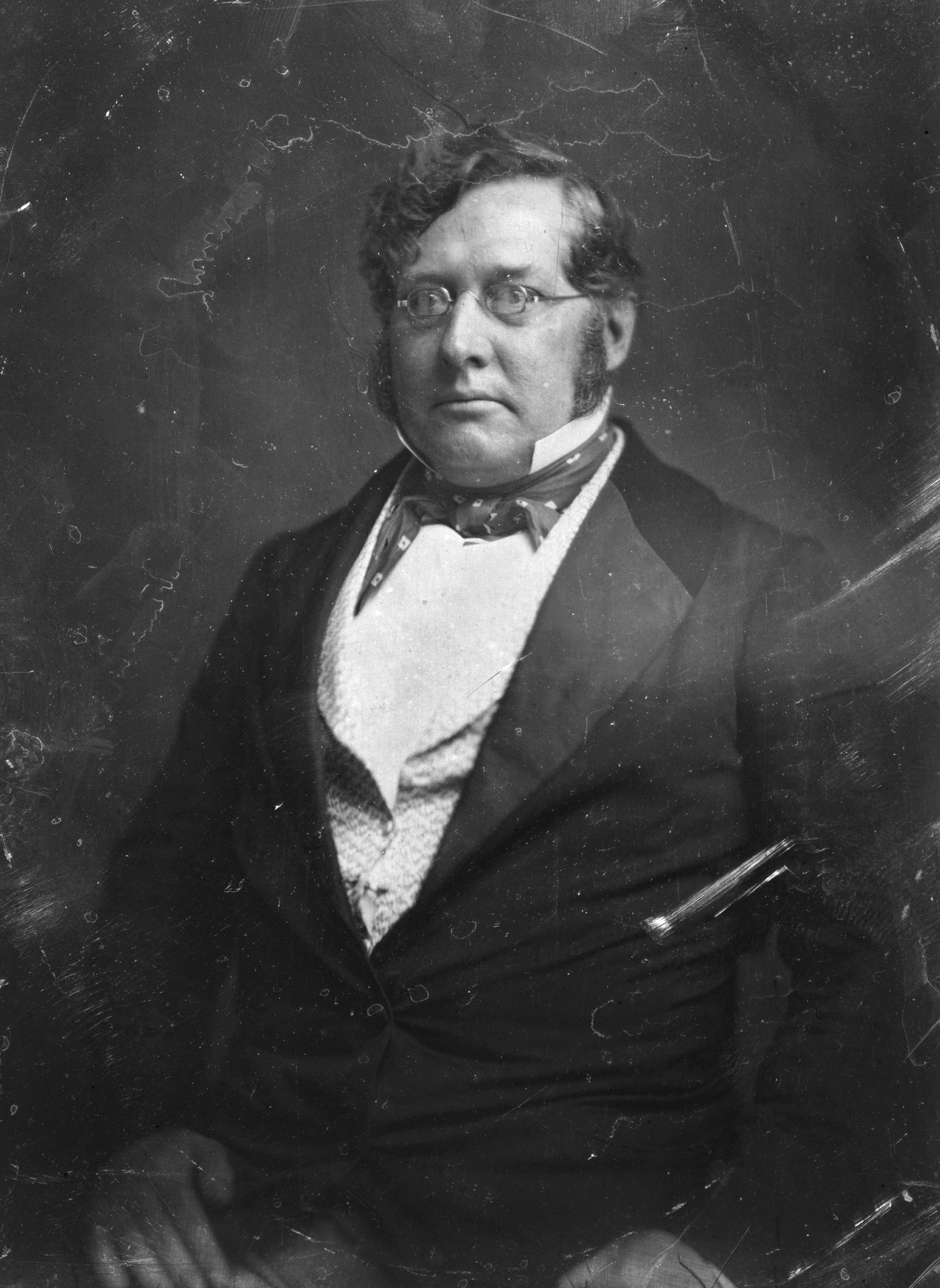
- In office January 12, 1850 – March 3, 1857
- Preceded by: David Stewart
- Succeeded by: Anthony Kennedy

27th Governor of Maryland
- In office January 6, 1845 – January 3, 1848
- Preceded by: Francis Thomas
- Succeeded by: Philip F. Thomas

Member of the Maryland House of Delegates
- In office 1832–1835

Personal details
- Born: February 18, 1804 Georgetown, Maryland, US
- Died: November 9, 1869 (aged 65) Baltimore, Maryland, US
- Party: Whig, Democrat
- Spouse: Adelaide MacKubin Kent
- Education: Georgetown University
- Profession: Politician, lawyer

Thomas George Pratt (February 18, 1804 – November 9, 1869) was a lawyer and politician from Annapolis, Maryland. He was the 27th governor of Maryland from 1845 to 1848 and a U.S. senator from 1850 to 1857.

== Early life and career ==
Pratt was born in Georgetown, Maryland (now a part of Washington, D.C.), completed preparatory studies, and attended Georgetown University. He is believed to have attended the College of New Jersey (now Princeton University) at some point, but this has yet to be proven. He studied law, was admitted to the bar, and commenced practice in Upper Marlboro, Maryland, in 1823. Pratt married and had five children with Adeline MacKubin Kent, daughter of Maryland governor Joseph Kent, on September 1, 1835.

Pratt served as a member of the Maryland House of Delegates from 1832 to 1835, and as a presidential elector on the Whig ticket for William Henry Harrison in 1836. He was appointed president of the Governor's Council in 1836, serving until the position was abolished the following year. Pratt was elected a member of the Maryland State Senate, the first directly elected senator from Prince George's County, Maryland, and served from 1838 to 1843. In 1844, Pratt was nominated as a candidate for governor representing the Whig party. He campaigned with the promise of resolving the serious state debt, and defeated his opponent, James Carroll, by a margin of a mere 548 votes.

== Governor of Maryland ==
Pratt immediately announced several long-term objectives, namely the immediate payment of the serious debt of the state. To raise state funds, Pratt put into effect direct taxes on the population by the government, an unpopular decision at the time, which nevertheless repopulated the state's treasury and allowed the repayment of the debt.

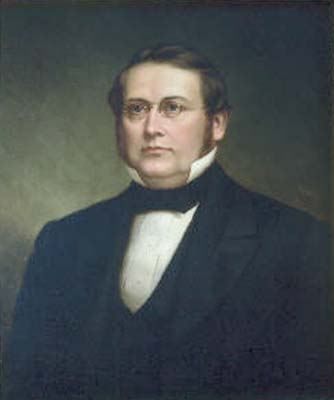
Thomas Pratt

The most serious problems of Pratt's administration came with relations to the northern neighbor state of Pennsylvania, which refused to comply with the Fugitive Slave Law. In 1847, when Maryland requested the return of several escaped slaves, Pennsylvania's governor bluntly refused, and, with the support of his attorney-general, went as far as to declare certain acts issued by the Maryland General Assembly to be unconstitutional. Two more incidents of this nature occurred during Pratt's tenure as governor, one involving the death of a slaveholder who was ambushed in Pennsylvania by abolitionists as he and his party returned to Maryland with their re-captured slaves. It was during this time that Pratt began to move away from the Whig party and more towards the Democratic Party.

In terms of transportation, Pratt favored the extension of the Baltimore and Ohio Railroad into Ohio, rather than supporting canals. Pratt also strongly encouraged peaceful and speedy resolution over the dispute between Great Britain and the United States regarding the Oregon Territory, stating that "no part of the Union would, in the event of war, be more exposed than Maryland".

== U.S. Senator and later life ==
Pratt's term as governor expired in 1848, and he briefly returned to practicing law in Annapolis, Maryland. The state legislature, however, nominated him in 1850 to assume the U.S. Senate seat left vacated by Reverdy Johnson, who had resigned to become Attorney General of the United States in the cabinet of President Zachary Taylor, and which had been temporarily filled by David Stewart. Pratt was reelected in 1851 and served from January 12, 1850, to March 3, 1857. As senator, Pratt supported Democrat James Buchanan in the 1856 presidential election, following the dissolution of the Whig party. The Silver Gray or Old Line faction of the Whigs, and the American Party, however, supported former President Millard Fillmore, who won in Maryland, and the American candidate, Anthony Kennedy, succeeded Pratt as senator.

When the American Civil War began, Pratt was eyed suspiciously by Maryland authorities, as he was staunchly pro-slavery, but mostly pro-South, and even gave a son to the Confederate Army. In 1863, Pratt tried to vote in the November election. He was not allowed to vote because he would not take a loyalty oath. Pratt and his secretary Col. Nicholson were arrested because of the refusal on November 21, 1863. He was imprisoned at Fort Monroe, but was later released. He moved to Baltimore, Maryland, in 1864, resuming the practice of law. The same year, Pratt served as a delegate to the Democratic National Convention. In 1866, he attended the National Union Convention in Philadelphia. Pratt was one of the attorneys for Jefferson Davis during his trial at Fortress Monroe. He was an unsuccessful candidate for election to the United States Senate in 1867, and died in Baltimore in 1869. He is interred in St. Anne’s Cemetery of Annapolis.

== Notes ==
Party political offices
Preceded by William Cost Johnson	Whig nominee for Governor of Maryland; 1844	Succeeded by William Tilghman Goldsborough
Political offices
Preceded by Francis Thomas	Governor of Maryland; January 6, 1845 – January 3, 1848	Succeeded by Philip F. Thomas
U.S. Senate
Preceded by David Stewart	U.S. senator (Class 1) from Maryland; January 12, 1850 – March 3, 1857; Served alongside: James A. Pearce	Succeeded by Anthony Kennedy
