= 1840 United States Senate special election in Pennsylvania =

The 1840 United States Senate election in Pennsylvania was held on January 14, 1840, after the regularly scheduled election in December 1838 was postponed due to the Buckshot War. Daniel Sturgeon was elected by the Pennsylvania General Assembly to the United States Senate.

== Background ==
Democrat Samuel McKean was elected by the Pennsylvania General Assembly, consisting of the House of Representatives and the Senate, in the 1832–33 Senate election. Sen. McKean's term was to expire on March 4, 1839, and an election would have occurred during the winter of 1838–1839 to elect a Senator for the successive term. The election did not occur, however, due to significant political unrest in Harrisburg, the state capital, over disputed election returns during the Buckshot War. McKean's seat was vacated when his term expired in March 1839 and remained vacant until the General Assembly elected a new Senator in 1840.

== Results ==
The Pennsylvania General Assembly convened on January 14, 1840, to elect a senator to serve out the remainder of the term that began on March 4, 1839. The results of the vote of both houses combined are as follows:

State legislature results
Party	Candidate	Votes	%
Democratic	Daniel Sturgeon	87	65.41
Whig	Charles Ogle	26	19.55
Anti-Masonic	Richard Biddle	17	12.78
N/A	Not voting	3	2.26
Totals		133	100.00%

== See also ==
- 1838–39 United States Senate elections
- 1840–41 United States Senate elections

Preceded by 1832-33	Pennsylvania U.S. Senate election (Class I); 1840	Succeeded by 1845
