= Daniel Sturgeon =

American politician (1789–1878)

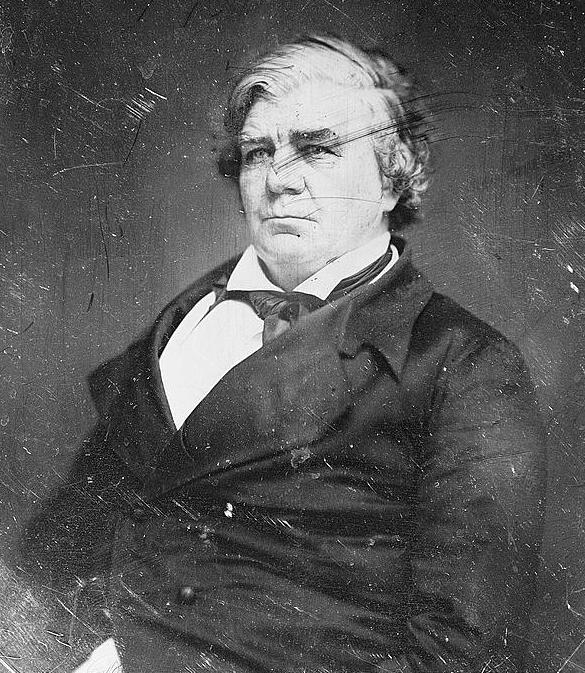
- Sturgeon c. 1844–60

United States Senator from Pennsylvania
- In office January 14, 1840 – March 4, 1851
- Preceded by: Samuel McKean
- Succeeded by: Richard Brodhead

13th Treasurer of Pennsylvania
- In office 1836–1840
- Governor: Joseph Ritner
- Preceded by: Joseph Lawrence
- Succeeded by: Almon Heath Read

4th Auditor General of Pennsylvania
- In office 1830–1836
- Governor: George Wolf
- Preceded by: David Mann
- Succeeded by: Nathaniel P. Hobart

Member of the Pennsylvania Senate for the 19th district
- In office 1825–1830

Member of the Pennsylvania House of Representatives
- In office 1818–1824

Personal details
- Born: October 27, 1789 Mount Pleasant Township, Pennsylvania, U.S.
- Died: July 3, 1878 (aged 88) Uniontown, Pennsylvania, U.S.
- Party: Democratic
- Spouse: Nancy Gregg Sturgeon
- Profession: Politician, Banker, Physician

Daniel Sturgeon (October 27, 1789 – July 3, 1878) was an American medical doctor, banker and Democratic party politician from Uniontown, Pennsylvania. He served in both houses of the state legislature and represented Pennsylvania in the United States Senate.

== Biography ==
Daniel Sturgeon was born on October 27, 1789, in Mount Pleasant Township, present-day Adams County, Pennsylvania. He later moved with his parents to Pittsburgh, Pennsylvania in 1804. He attended Jefferson College in Canonsburg, Pennsylvania, and Jefferson Medical College in Philadelphia. Sturgeon practiced medicine in Uniontown, Pennsylvania, until being appointed county coroner in 1813. He served in the Pennsylvania House of Representatives from 1818 until 1824 and the Pennsylvania State Senate for the 19th district from 1825 until 1830, serving as President of that body for the final two years of his term until serving as Pennsylvania Auditor General from 1830 until 1836. Immediately prior to being elected to the U.S. Senate, Sturgeon served as Pennsylvania Treasurer from 1838 until 1839. The Senate seat on which Sturgeon served is now held by Democratic Senator Bob Casey Jr.

Sturgeon was elected by the state legislature to the United States Senate on January 14, 1840, to serve the term that commenced on March 4, 1839. He was re-elected to the U.S. Senate in 1845 and was not a candidate for re-election in 1851. His term expired in March 1851. While a U.S. Senator, Sturgeon served as chairman of the Committee on Patents and the Patent Office and the Committee on Agriculture.

Following his tenure in the U.S. Senate, Sturgeon was appointed treasurer of the United States Mint in Philadelphia by President Franklin Pierce, serving from 1853 until 1858. He died in Uniontown, Pennsylvania, on July 3, 1878.

Political offices
Preceded by Joseph Lawrence	Treasurer of Pennsylvania; 1836–1840	Succeeded by Almon H. Reed
U.S. Senate
Preceded by Samuel McKean	U.S. senator (Class 1) from Pennsylvania; January 14, 1840 – March 4, 1851; Served alongside: James Buchanan, Simon Cameron and James Cooper	Succeeded by Richard Brodhead
Honorary titles
Preceded by John Ruggles	Oldest living U.S. senator June 20, 1874 – July 3, 1878	Succeeded by Joseph Cilley
