= Joseph W. Chalmers =

American politician

United States Senator from Mississippi
- In office November 3, 1845 – March 3, 1847
- Preceded by: Robert J. Walker
- Succeeded by: Henry S. Foote

Personal details
- Born: Joseph Williams Chalmers; December 20, 1806 Halifax County, Virginia, U.S.
- Died: June 16, 1853 (aged 46) Holly Springs, Mississippi, U.S.
- Party: Democratic

Joseph Williams Chalmers (December 20, 1806 – June 16, 1853) was a United States senator from Mississippi.

== Biography ==
Born in Halifax County, Virginia, he studied law in the University of Virginia at Charlottesville, and in Richmond. He was admitted to the bar and practiced.

He moved with his family to Jackson, Tennessee in 1835 and to Holly Springs, Mississippi in 1839, practicing law in both places. He followed the rapid expansion of the cotton industry in the Deep South.

Chalmers was appointed as vice chancellor of the northern Mississippi district in 1842 and 1843. He was appointed to and subsequently elected by the Mississippi legislature as a Democrat to the U.S. Senate to fill the vacancy caused by the resignation of Robert J. Walker, serving from November 3, 1845, to March 3, 1847. While in the Senate, Chalmers was chairman of the Committee on Engrossed Bills (29th United States Congress). He was the Uncle to Jefferson Davis and had the future Confederate General become a protege with him while studying law. (The Papers by Jefferson Davis 1841=1846)

Chalmers engaged in the practice of law in Holly Springs until his death in 1853; interment was in Hill Crest Cemetery.

His son James Ronald Chalmers was first elected in 1876 as a U.S. Representative from Mississippi's 6th congressional district, serving from 1877 to 1884. His term was interrupted in 1882, as his election in 1880 had been contested by John R. Lynch, his Republican opponent. Congress seated Lynch for the remainder of the term. In 1882 Chalmers won as an Independent Democrat.

U.S. Senate
Preceded by Robert J. Walker	U.S. senator (Class 2) from Mississippi; 1845–1847; Served alongside: Jesse Speight	Succeeded by Henry S. Foote
