= Benning W. Jenness =

American politician

Benning Wentworth Jenness
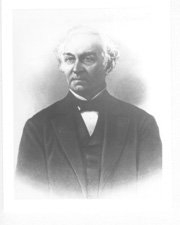

United States Senator from New Hampshire
- In office December 1, 1845 – June 13, 1846
- Appointed by: John Hardy Steele
- Preceded by: Levi Woodbury
- Succeeded by: Joseph Cilley

Member of the New Hampshire House of Representatives

Personal details
- Born: July 14, 1806 Deerfield, New Hampshire
- Died: November 16, 1879 (aged 73) Cleveland, Ohio
- Party: Democratic
- Profession: Politician, Judge, Merchant, Banker

Benning Wentworth Jenness (July 14, 1806 – November 16, 1879) was a United States senator from New Hampshire.

Born in Deerfield, he attended Bradford Academy, Massachusetts and engaged in mercantile pursuits in Strafford, New Hampshire from 1826 to 1856. He held several local offices and was a member of the New Hampshire House of Representatives. From 1841 to 1845 he was judge of probate of Strafford County, and was appointed to the U.S. Senate to fill the vacancy caused by the resignation of Levi Woodbury. Jenness served from December 1, 1845, to June 13, 1846, and was an unsuccessful Democratic candidate for election in 1846 to the Thirtieth Congress. He was a member of the state constitutional convention in 1850 and was nominated for Governor of New Hampshire in 1861 but withdrew. He moved to Ohio and engaged in lumbering and banking. Bennett W. Jenness died in Cleveland; interment was in the family cemetery, Strafford, New Hampshire.

U.S. Senate
Preceded by Levi Woodbury	U.S. senator (Class 2) from New Hampshire; December 1, 1845 – June 13, 1846; Served alongside: Charles G. Atherton	Succeeded by Joseph Cilley
