= Townsend Haines =

American politician and judge (1792–1865)

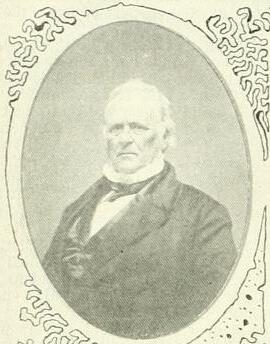
- Haines in a 1899 publication

Secretary of the Commonwealth of Pennsylvania
- In office 1848–1850
- Preceded by: Jesse Miller
- Succeeded by: Alexander L. Russel

Member of the Pennsylvania House of Representatives from the Chester County district
- In office 1827–1828

Personal details
- Born: January 7, 1792 West Chester, Pennsylvania, U.S.
- Died: October 5, 1865 (aged 73) West Chester, Pennsylvania, U.S.
- Party: Whig
- Occupation: Politician; judge; lawyer

Townsend Haines (January 7, 1792 – October 5, 1865) was an American politician and judge from Pennsylvania. He served as a member of the Pennsylvania House of Representatives, representing Chester County from 1827 to 1828. He served as Secretary of the Commonwealth of Pennsylvania.

== Early life ==
Townsend Haines was born on January 7, 1792, in West Chester, Pennsylvania, to Ann (née Ryant) and Caleb Haines. His father was a Loyalist during the Revolutionary War and was a refugee in Nova Scotia until he received amnesty. In October 1809, Haines studied at the school of Enoch Lewis in New Garden Township. In 1815, he studied Latin under Mr. Glass in West Chester. He then studied the law under Judge Isaac Darlington and was admitted to the bar on February 7, 1818.

== Career ==
Haines first practiced law in the orphans' court.

Haines was elected as a member of the Pennsylvania House of Representatives, representing Chester County in 1826 and was re-elected in 1827. In 1846, he was a candidate for the U.S. Congress as a Whig. Under Governor William F. Johnston, he served as Secretary of the Commonwealth of Pennsylvania. In 1851, he was elected president judge of the 15th judicial district, comprising Chester and Delaware counties. He served in that role for ten years.

== Personal life ==
Haines married. His wife died in 1865.

Haines died on October 5, 1865, at his home in West Chester.
