= Joseph Cilley (1791–1887) =

American politician

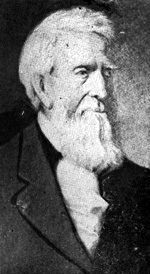

United States Senator from New Hampshire
- In office June 13, 1846 – March 3, 1847
- Preceded by: Benning W. Jenness
- Succeeded by: John P. Hale

Personal details
- Born: January 4, 1791 Nottingham, New Hampshire
- Died: September 16, 1887 (aged 96) Nottingham, New Hampshire
- Party: Democrat, Liberty
- Profession: Politician, farmer

Joseph Cilley (January 4, 1791 – September 16, 1887) was a United States senator from New Hampshire.

Cilley was born in Nottingham, New Hampshire, the son of Greenleaf Cilley and his wife Jane Nealy. He was also the grandson of Revolutionary War officer Joseph Cilley, after whom he was named. He was the nephew of Bradbury Cilley and brother of Jonathan Cilley.

Cilley was educated at Atkinson Academy and joined the Army to fight in the War of 1812 as an officer in the 21st Infantry Regiment, seeing action at the Battle of Sackett's Harbor and Battle of Chrysler's Farm. Joseph Cilley was severely wounded at the Battle of Lundy's Lane; he was shot through the leg by a musket ball causing a compound fracture. He attained the brevetted rank of captain, was the quartermaster of the New Hampshire Militia in 1817, and was the division inspector in 1821. After his military service Joseph Cilley became an aide-de-camp to Governor Benjamin Pierce in 1827.

In 1846, a Whig–Liberty Party–Independent Democrat coalition assumed power in New Hampshire state government. Whig Anthony Colby was elected Governor, Independent Democrat John P. Hale was elected Speaker of the State House of Representatives, and Cilley was elected to the United States Senate to fill the vacancy caused by the resignation of Levi Woodbury. Cilley served from June 13, 1846, to March 3, 1847. He was an unsuccessful candidate for reelection in 1846, after which he retired to his farm in Nottingham. He was interred in the general Joseph Cilley Burying Ground in Nottingham Square.

At the time of his death, he was the oldest living ex-U.S. Senator.

== Bibliography ==
- United States Congress. "Joseph Cilley (id: C000396)". Biographical Directory of the United States Congress.
- Scales, John. Life of General Joseph Cilley. New Hampshire: Standard Book Co., 1921.
- Memoirs and Services of Three Generations: General Joseph Cilley, First New hampshire Line. War of the Revolution; Johnathan Longfellow, Father of sarah, wife of General Joseph Cilley; Colonel Joseph Cilley, U.S. Senator and Officer in the War of 1812; Honorable Johnathan Cilley, Member of Congress from Maine; Commander Greenleaf Cilley, War with Mexico and War of 1861; General Johnathan P. Cilley, First Main Cavalry, War of the Rebellion - reprint from the Courier-Gazette, Rockland Maine, 1909

U.S. Senate
Preceded by Benning W. Jenness	U.S. senator (Class 2) from New Hampshire; June 13, 1846 – March 3, 1847; Served alongside: Charles G. Atherton	Succeeded by John P. Hale
Honorary titles
Preceded by Daniel Sturgeon	Oldest living U.S. senator July 3, 1878 – September 16, 1887	Succeeded by Simon Cameron
