= Jesse Ianthus Alexander =

American politician (1824–1871)

Colonel Jesse Ianthus Alexander
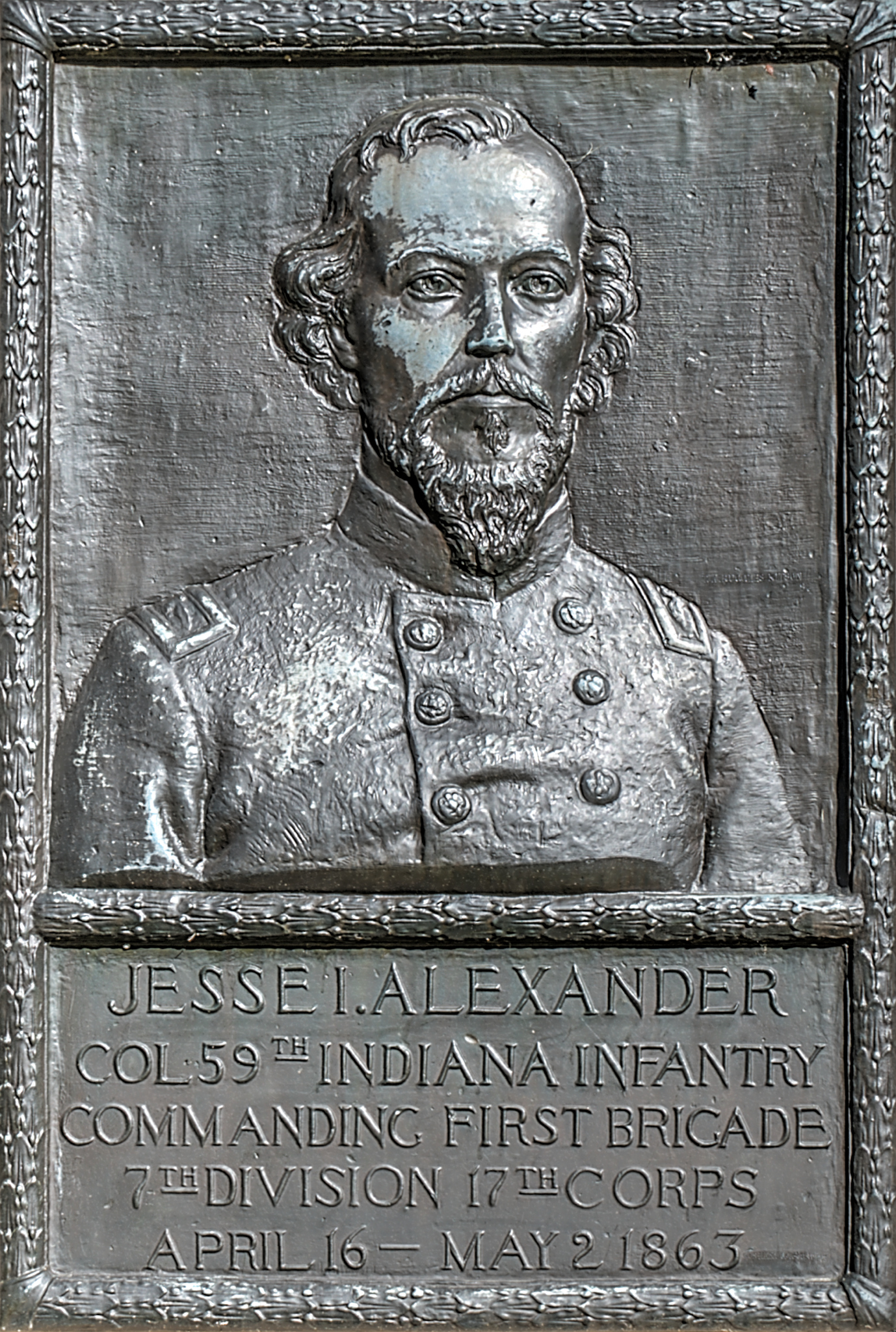
- Bronze relief portrait of Colonel Jesse Ianthus Alexander of the 59th Indiana Infantry Regiment at the Vicksburg National Military Park

Personal details
- Born: October 10, 1824 Gosport, Indiana
- Died: May 30, 1871 (age 46) Terre Haute, Indiana
- Resting place: Gosport Cemetery; Gosport, Indiana
- Spouse: Eliza F.D. Livingston
- Children: 3
- Education: Indiana University Bloomington
- Occupation: Politician; Military Officer; Lawyer
- Profession: Lawyer

Military service
- Allegiance: United States of America
- Branch/service: United States Army; Union Army
- Years of service: 1847–1848; 1862–1864
- Rank: Colonel
- Unit: 4th Indiana Volunteers
- Commands: 59th Indiana Infantry Regiment
- Battles/wars: Mexican-American War; American Civil War

Jesse Ianthus Alexander (October 10, 1824 – May 30, 1871) was a politician, lawyer, and veteran of both the Mexican–American War and the American Civil War from Gosport, Indiana. Alexander served in the 4th Indiana Volunteers under Colonel Willis A. Gorman and was later elected as the Colonel of the 59th Indiana Infantry Regiment during the American Civil War. Alexander served in the Indiana Senate from 1850 to 1852 and again in 1855 and 1857 and was affiliated with the Republican Party.

== Early life ==
Jesse Ianthus Alexander was born in Gosport, Indiana, on October 10, 1824. He was the son of Abner D. Alexander (1787–1871) and Mary Brown (1789–1843), not much is known about Alexander's early life. Alexander was part of the graduating class of 1845 at Indiana University Bloomington where he graduated with a bachelor's degree in law.

== Military career ==
During the Mexican–American War in 1847–1848 Alexander volunteered and served as the Captain of Company B of the 4th Indiana Volunteers under the command of Willis A. Gorman. The 4th Indiana Regiment fought at several notable battles of the Mexican-American War under the command of Brigadier General Joseph Lane including; the Siege of Veracruz, the Siege of Puebla, the Battle of Huamantla, the Action of Atlixco, the Skirmish at Matamoros, and the Affair at Galaxara Pass. Alexander, along with the rest of the 4th Indiana Volunteers were mustered out of federal service in July, 1848 in Madison, Indiana.

At the outbreak of the American Civil War Alexander again volunteered for service in the United States Volunteers on October 10, 1861. In February 1862 Alexander raised the 59th Indiana Infantry Regiment primarily out of Owen, Hendricks, Morgan, Sullivan, Greene, Decatur, Orange, Crawford, Putnam, Clay, Vigo, and Harrison counties. Following the regiments muster in Gosport, Alexander was elected as the regiment's Colonel. the 59th Indiana fought in the Western theater of the American Civil War and played a significant part in the Siege of Vicksburg. Alexander resigned from his position as commander of the 59th Indiana on August 12, 1864, shortly before the Atlanta Campaign. Following his military career Alexander worked as a lawyer in Gosport before moving to Terre Haute.

== Political career ==
Alexander served in the Indiana Senate from 1850 to 1852 and again in 1855 and 1857.

== Personal life and death ==
Alexander married Eliza F.D. Livingston (1832–1914) and had a total of three children. Alexander died in Terre Haute, Indiana, on May 30, 1871, and is buried at the Gosport Cemetery in Gosport, Indiana.

== Legacy ==
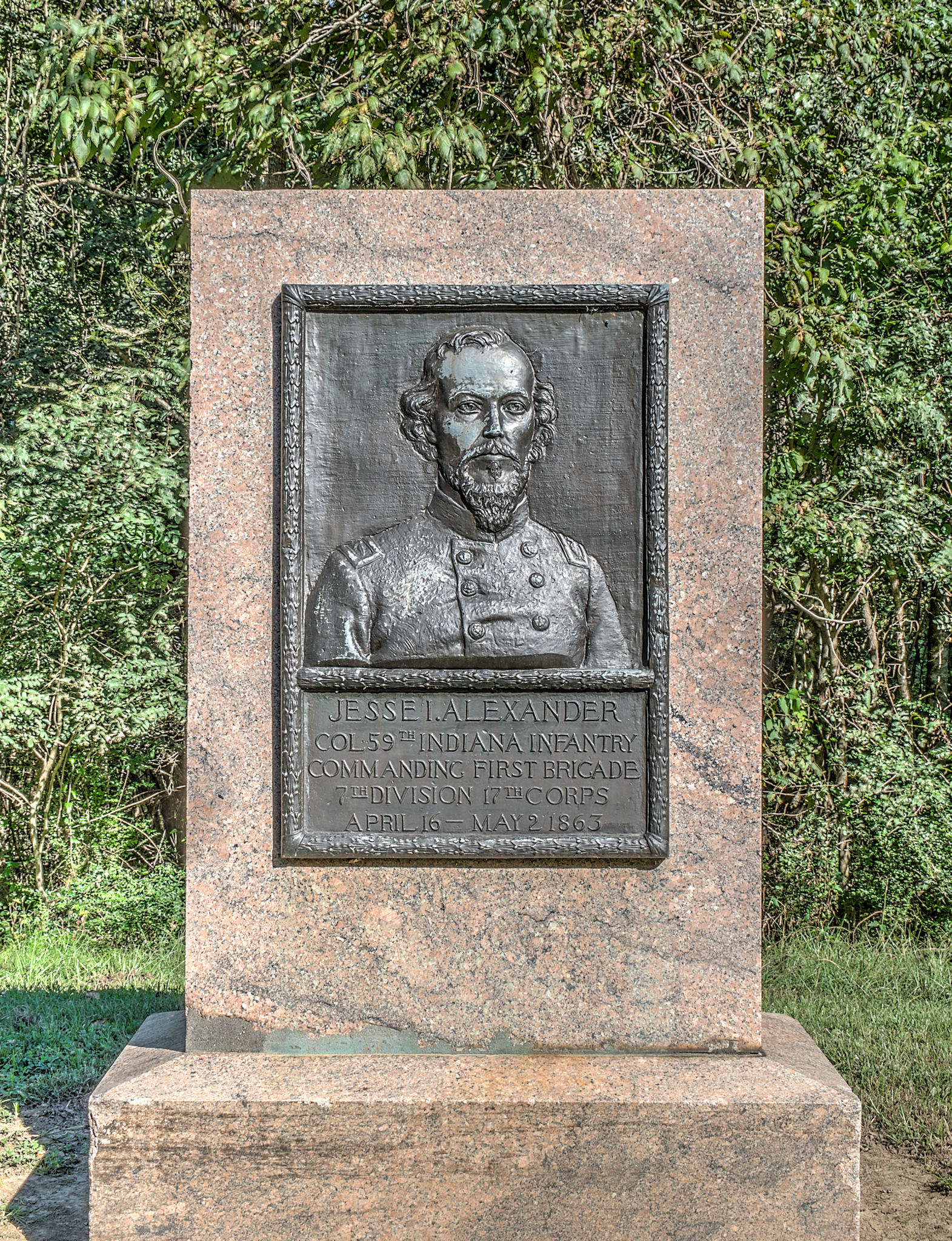
59th Indiana Monument at the Vicksburg National Military Park

A monument honoring Alexander and the 59th Indiana was erected at the Vicksburg National Military Park in 1918. At the time of the Vicksburg campaign Alexander had taken over command of the First Brigade, Seventh Division of the XVII Corps. The text on the monument states the following:

"Col. 59th Indiana Infantry

Commanding First Brigade 7th Division 17th Corps

April 16 — May 2, 1863".
