= 4th Indiana Volunteers =

Infantry regiment from the Mexican-American War

4th Indiana Volunteer Infantry Regiment
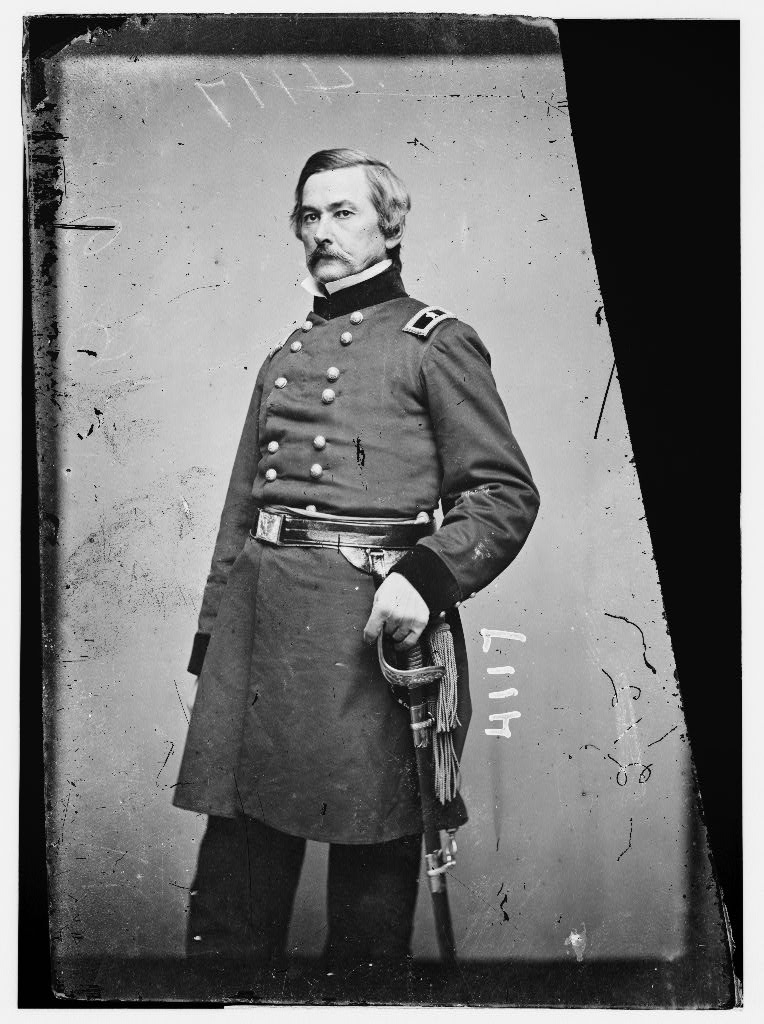
- Brigadier General Willis A. Gorman c.1861
- Active: April 1847 – July 1848
- Country: United States
- Allegiance: Indiana
- Branch: United States Volunteers
- Type: Infantry
- Engagements: Mexican-American War: Siege of Veracruz; Siege of Puebla (1847); Battle of Huamantla; Action of Atlixco; Skirmish at Matamoros; Affair at Galaxara Pass

Commanders
- Colonel: Willis A. Gorman
- Notable commanders: Ebenezer Dumont

The 4th Indiana Volunteers, also known as the 4th Indiana Volunteer Infantry Regiment, was an infantry regiment of United States Volunteers from the state of Indiana that participated in the Mexican–American War. The unit was formed and commanded by future Minnesota Territory Governor and Indiana Democrat politician Willis A. Gorman.

== Organization ==
The regiment began to recruit volunteers for service starting on May 30, 1847. The regiment was mustered into federal service on April 24, 1847, in Jeffersonville, Indiana. The election of regimental officers for the regiment took place at Fort Clark, Texas on June 16, 1847, when Willis A. Gorman of Monroe County, Indiana was elected as the regiment's colonel, while Ebenezer Dumont of Dearborn County, Indiana was elected as the regiment's lieutenant colonel. Other officers of the regiment include William Wirt McCoy of La Porte, Indiana who was elected as the regiment's major.

Organization of Regiment in 1847
Company	Earliest moniker	Primary place of recruitment	Earliest captain
A	Gibson County Volunteers	Primarily Fort Branch and Gibson County, Indiana	John W. Dodd
B	Wayne County Volunteers	Gosport, Indiana	Jesse Ianthus Alexander
C			Morgan Lewis Payne
D	Marion County Volunteers	Indianapolis and Marion County	Edward M. Lander
E	Spencer County Volunteers	Spencer County	John W. Crooks
F	The Bartholomew Volunteers	Bartholomew County	Michael Fitzgibbon (Fitz Gibbon)
G	Monroe County Volunteers or "Rough and Ready Guards"	Monroe County	Daniel Lunderman
H	The Clay County Volunteers	Primarily Terre Haute, Vigo County and Clay County	Landon Cochran
I			Robert Favell
K			Alexander L. Mason

== Service ==
Under Colonel Gorman, the regiment left New Albany, Indiana on June 28, 1847, aboard the steamboats Saladin, Ben Franklin No. 6, and M.B. Hamer bound for New Orleans. Five companies of the regiment sailed to Brazos Island on July 7, 1847. The five remaining companies left on the 9th on the ships Anna Chase and Sophia Walker. Near the mouth of the Sabine River one of the boilers of Ann Chase burst. No one was killed right away, however, two privates died later in the day from injuries received during the explosion. The schooner Starr was later dispatched to the regiment to get the rest of the troops to Mexico. The Texas newspaper The Galveston Civilian of July 21, 1847 commented upon the departure of the Indiana troops stating "They had been a quiet and orderly body of men when off duty and ventured that if they behaved as well in battle as they did in the city, there would be no more reproaches cast upon Indiana troops".

During the course of the war the regiment fought in Brigadier General Joseph Lane's brigade. The regiment took part in many of the later war engagements of the Mexican-American War including; the Siege of Veracruz, the Siege of Puebla, the Battle of Huamantla, the Action of Atlixco, the Skirmish at Matamoros, and the Affair at Galaxara Pass. From November, 1847 until March, 1848 the regiment was garrisoned at Puebla for the remainder of the war. The regiment was mustered out of federal service by company in July, 1848 in Madison, Indiana.

== Commanders ==
- Willis A. Gorman: June, 1847 - April, 1848.

== Notable people ==
Several notable people served in the regiment including the following:

- Willis A. Gorman: Served as the colonel of the regiment throughout its entire deployment to Mexico. Gorman would later work in the field of politics as a Democrat and would eventually become the 2nd Territorial Governor of Minnesota serving from April 1, 1853, to March 13, 1857. Gorman briefly served in the American Civil War colonel of the 1st Minnesota Infantry Regiment in 1861 during the First Battle of Bull Run.
- Ebenezer Dumont: Served as the lieutenant colonel of the regiment. Dumont was a U.S. Representative from Indiana, serving two terms from 1863 to 1867. Dumont served in the American Civil War as the colonel of the 7th Indiana Infantry Regiment before being promoted to the rank of Brigadier General and subsequently resigning.
- Thomas John Lucas: Lucas served in the regiment for 14 months as a second lieutenant. Lucas later served the Union in the American Civil War as a Brigadier General and Brevet Major General.
- Albert Gallatin Brackett: Originally served as a second lieutenant in the regiment, Brackett would go on to establish a military career and fought in the American Civil War where he commanded the 9th Illinois Cavalry Regiment.
- Isaac Newton Winans: Served as a private in Company B during the war. Winans later served in the American Civil War as the captain of Company B of the 31st Indiana Infantry Regiment. His brother was William Parkhurst Winans.
- Jesse Ianthus Alexander: Served as the captain of Company B during the war. Alexander would go on to become a senator in the Indiana Senate from 1850 to 1852 and again in 1855 and 1857. During the American Civil War Alexander served as the colonel of the 59th Indiana Infantry Regiment.
- Edward M. Lander: Indiana judge, the First Chief justice of Washington Territory, and a founding figure of the University of Washington.

== See also ==
- List of U.S. Army, Navy and Volunteer units in the Mexican–American War
- United States Volunteers
