= John E. Ross =

American politician

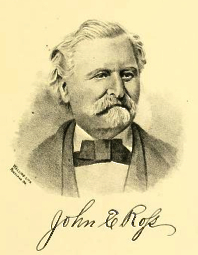
- Born: February 15, 1818; Madison County, Ohio
- Died: February 17, 1890 (aged 72)
- Occupation: Oregon politician
- Spouse: Elizabeth Hopwood

John England Ross (February 18, 1818 – February 17, 1890) was an American politician born in Madison County, Ohio. He led volunteer forces from Oregon in the Cayuse War and the Modoc War, prospected for gold in the California Gold Rush, and represented Jackson County, Oregon in the Oregon Territorial Legislature and Oregon State Senate.

== Biography ==
John E. Ross moved with his father, Angus Ross, to Fountain County, Indiana, when he was ten years old; and to Cook County, Illinois, in 1833. In 1840, he married the daughter of Alexander Robinson, of Chicago. She died about eight months later.

In 1847, Ross came to Oregon as captain of a 40-wagon train. Ross, Joseph Kline, and an Englishman, left the company at Grand Ronde, with the intention of coming on through ahead of them. On the road beyond Rock Creek, they found a train that had been attacked by the Indians. They overtook the emigrants after crossing John Day River, who proved to be the Warren party. They had been robbed of all they possessed, including their clothing. Ross traded his clothes to the Indians for provisions for the destitute band, and remained with them until his own train arrived, all coming to Oregon together. General Ross landed at The Dalles without a dollar, and went to work on a boat which brought down emigrants to the falls, at one dollar per day. About the first of November 1847, he went to Oregon City and opened a butcher shop, which he operated for about a month.

When the Cayuse War broke out, Ross enlisted in the first volunteer company, known as the "Oregon Rifles" with H. A. G. Lee, captain, and Joseph Magone, first lieutenant. Ross, as second lieutenant, went with the company to the mission station at The Dalles, on the Columbia River. When Lee and Magone were promoted, Ross was commissioned as Captain of the company, a position he held throughout the war.

In 1848, after the Cayuse War, he returned to Oregon City. He was running a threshing machine when he heard about the California Gold Rush. He left his machine standing in the field, and went to the mines on Feather River, where he engaged in mining until the fall of 1849. He then returned to Oregon but in the spring of 1850, he returned to the mines in California, which made him party to those who found gold on the Scott River. In 1851, he came to Yreka, California, before going on to Josephine Creek in Oregon; at the latter he was part of those people who found gold on Canyon Creek, in Josephine County, Oregon. He also found "several rich placers", including Yankee Jim's (Placer County, California), Wambo Bar (Yuba River), and Jacksonville (now fully submerged under Don Pedro Reservoir).

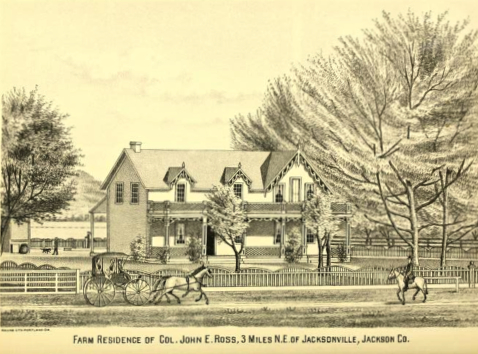
Farm residence of Colonel John E. Ross, 3 miles northeast of Jacksonville, Oregon

Ross returned to the Willamette Valley in the winter of 1851 and purchased a herd of cattle, driving the cattle to the Rogue River Valley in January 1852, and opened a butcher's shop at Jacksonville, Oregon.

In the fall of 1852, General Ross raised a company of thirty men and went to rescue immigrants who were attacked at Bloody Point on Tule Lake. They joined Benjamin Wright's company at Clear Lake, and with them met a party of immigrants between Clear and Goose Lakes, returning with them. On the road they buried about fourteen of the immigrants, who had been killed by Indians. Ross and his company paid their own expenses on this trip, and for pay they received the thanks of the Oregon Legislature.

In January 1853, he married Elizabeth Hopwood. This was the first marriage performed in Jacksonville. A Methodist preacher by the name of Gilbert officiated at the ceremony. Ross settled on a farm in December 1853. The couple had nine children, five girls and four boys.

In August 1853, an Indian war broke out, and Ross became a colonel in command of two battalions of mounted volunteers. After operating a few days in conjunction with Colonel Alden, of the U.S. Army, and having only a few skirmishes with the Indians, General Lane arrived and took command. After a hard-fought battle on the headwaters of Evans Creek, in which General Lane and Colonel Alden were wounded, and Pleasant Armstrong and several others killed, Colonel Ross was part of the group assisting General Lane in negotiating a treaty at the Council of Table Rock. The negotiations were held near Lower Table Rock, with Takelma leader Apserkahar ("Chief Joe") and representatives of the Shasta and Dakubetede Indians of the Rogue River Valley. According to another source, Ross acted as interpreter, both at the preliminary arrangements for the treaty, and at the treaty itself, although James W. Nesmith was the appointed interpreter by General Lane. The Indians, however, did not know Nesmith, and were acquainted with General Ross, and it was only through him that they would communicate what they had to say in relation to the treaty.

In 1854, Ross was ordered by the Governor to organize a company and sent them out to protect the immigrants on the southern route, which was done, Captain Walker commanding. On June 5 of that year he was commissioned colonel of the 9th Regiment by Governor John W. Davis. In the fall of 1855, a breakout of the Indians, not only in his county but in the northern part of the Oregon as well, resulted in a general war. Colonel Ross took the field as commander of the 9th Regiment, fought several severe battles, and was at length superseded in command by Col. J. K. Lamerick. A detailed description of Ross and his regiment at the October 31, 1855 defeat at the Battle of Hungry Hill appeared in the New York Herald.

At a special election held December 15, 1855, Ross was elected to represent Jackson County in the Oregon Territorial Council, to fill a vacancy caused by the resignation of Dr. E. H. Cleaveland. In the general election in June 1866, he was elected to the Oregon Legislative Assembly.

In 1866-7 the California and Oregon Railroad Company was formed. Colonel Ross was elected one of its directors, and the directors transferred the franchise to Ben Holladay.

Ross was appointed Brigadier-General of the First Brigade of the Oregon Militia by Governor La Fayette Grover on December 2, 1872, as the Modoc War began. Ross took the field, commanding throughout the war. He participated in the principal engagements of the Modoc War, including the First Battle of the Stronghold.

In 1878, he represented Jackson County in the State Senate, and was honored by being appointed Chairman of the Military Committee. He was appointed one of the investigating committee to report upon the acts of the preceding administration.

Hubert Howe Bancroft, in his Oregon Biographical Sketches, remarked:

One whole night I spent with Ross at Jacksonville, writing down his experiences; and when at early dawn my driver summoned me, I resumed my journey under a sickening sensation from the tales of bloody butcheries in which the gallant colonel had so gloriously participated.

== Selected works ==
- Grover, La Fayette (1874). Report of Governor Grover to General Schofield on the Modoc War : and reports of Major General John F. Miller and General John E. Ross, to the Governor : also letter of the governor to the Secretary of the Interior on the Wallowa Valley Indian question. Salem, OR: M.V. Brown, State Printer.
- "Correspondence with Capt. O.C. Applegate and Capt. Hyzer" (PDF). Fisher Papers. pp. 1197–1190. Archived from the original (PDF) on March 8, 2014.
