= 3rd Indiana Volunteers (Mexican-American War) =

Infantry regiment of US volunteers (1846–1847)

3rd Indiana Volunteers 3rd Indiana Volunteer Infantry Regiment
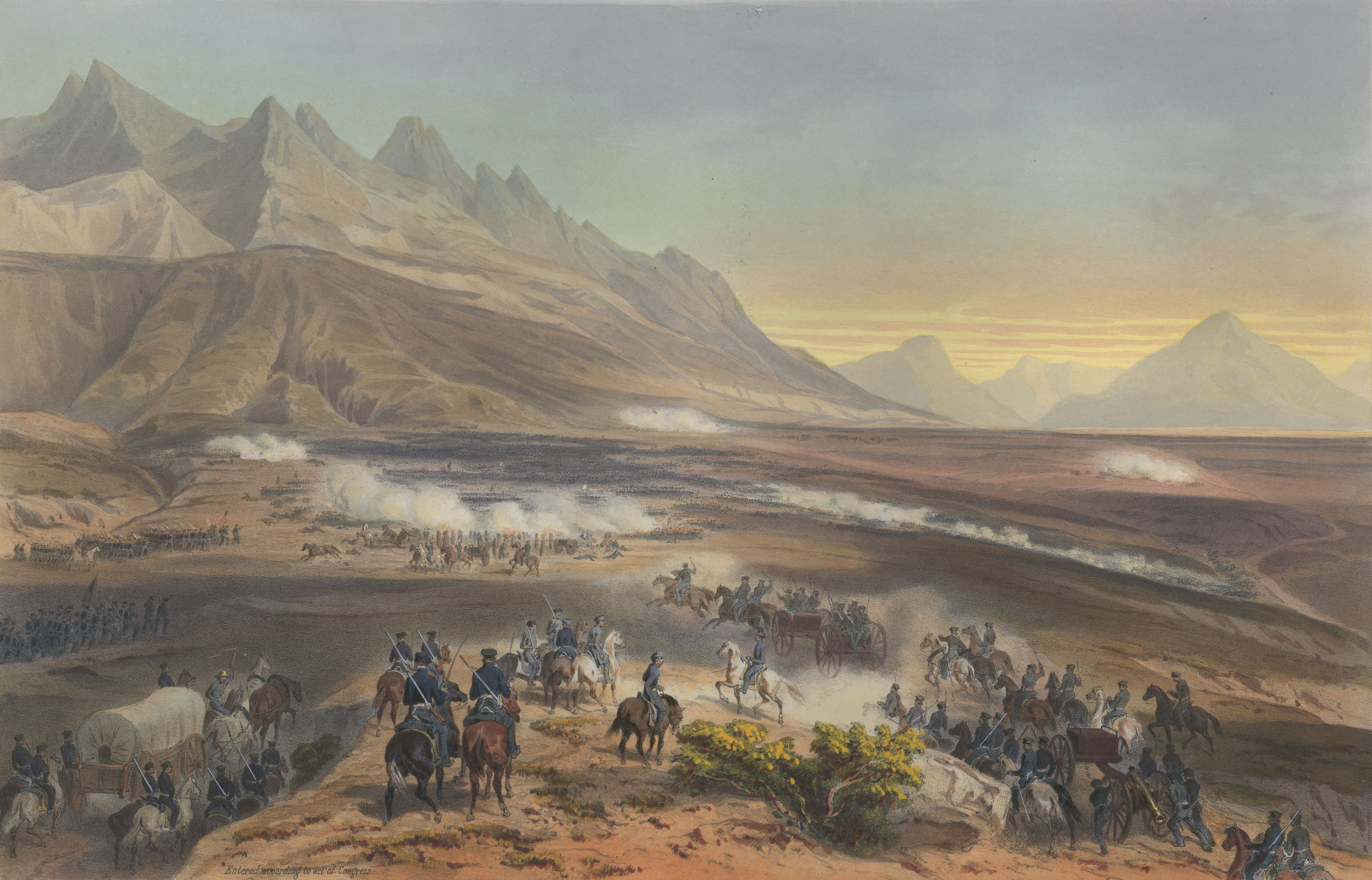
- The Battle of Buena vista by Carl Nebel c.1851
- Active: May 1846 – May 1847
- Disbanded: May 25, 1847
- Country: United States
- Allegiance: Indiana
- Branch: United States Volunteers
- Type: Infantry
- Size: 869
- Engagements: Mexican-American War: Battle of Buena Vista

Commanders
- Colonel: James Henry Lane
- Colonel: Stanislaus Lasselle (LaSalle)

The 3rd Indiana Volunteers, also called the 3rd Indiana Volunteer Infantry Regiment, was an infantry regiment of United States Volunteers from the state of Indiana that participated in the Mexican–American War.

== Organization ==
According to the source Indiana in the Mexican War by Oran Perry Governor of Indiana James Whitcomb answered President James K. Polk's call for volunteers on May 22, 1846, by issuing a proclamation for Indiana to form volunteer companies of infantry which would aid the growing volunteer force headed to Mexico. The 3rd Indiana Volunteers were organized during the summer of 1846. The regiment consisted of the following companies when it was mustered into service on June 25, 1846:

Original Organization of Regiment in 1846
Company	Earliest Moniker	Primary Place of Recruitment	Earliest Captain
A	The Monroe Guards	Monroe County	John Martin Sluss
B	The Washington Guards	Washington County	William Ford
C	The Johnson Guards	Johnson County	David Allen
D	The Switzerland Rifles or The Switzerland Riflemen	Switzerland County	Scott Carter
E	The Brown County Blues	Brown County	James Taggart Jr.
F	The Bartholomew Volunteers	Bartholomew County	Isaac Boardman
G	The Madison Rifles	Madison County	Thomas L. Sullivan
H	The Shelby Rifles or The Shelby Riflemen	Shelby County	Voorhis Conover
I	Clark Guards	Clark County	Thomas Ware Gibson
K	The Dearborn Volunteers	Dearborn County	Jim Lane

According to Indiana Adjutant General Oran D. Perry, Jim Lane was elected as the original Colonel of the regiment when the unit was mustered into federal service, however, Lane resigned from the position before he even had the chance to command the regiment. Lane's appointed successor was Stanislaus Lasselle (also spelled as LaSalle), the son of General Hyacinth Lasselle (1777–1843), a veteran of the War of 1812 and one of the founders of Terre Haute, Indiana. Lasselle had previously served in the 1st Indiana Volunteers as the Captain of Company G and served under Lieutenant Colonel Henry Smith Lane.

== Service ==
During the Battle of Buena Vista the 2nd Indiana Volunteers and the 3rd Indiana Volunteers contributed heavily to the battle alongside troops of Jefferson Davis's Mississippi Rifles. Edward Deering Mansfield states the following in his book The Mexican War: a History of its Origin, and a Detailed Account of the Victories:

"The Third Indiana regiment, under Colonel Lane, and a fragment of the Second, under Colonel Bowles, were associated with the Mississippi regiment during the greater portion of the day, and acquitted themselves creditably in repulsing the attempts of the enemy to break that portion of our line".

Buena Vista was the 3rd Indiana's only battle during the course of the war. The regiment stayed in Mexico for the remainder of the war until it was sent back to New Orleans and was later mustered out of service in Indiana on May 25, 1847. Many veterans of the 3rd Indiana Volunteers later joined the 4th Indiana Volunteers under Colonel Willis A. Gorman and continued to fight in the war until 1848 with the signing of the Treaty of Guadalupe Hidalgo. Others joined the 5th Indiana Volunteers under Colonel Lane, but were never deployed in combat while in Mexico.

== Commanders ==
- Jim Lane: May 1846: Resigned
- Stanislaus Lasselle: May 1846 – May 1847

== Notable people ==
- Willis A. Gorman: Briefly served as the Major of the regiment before being reassigned to command the 4th Indiana Volunteers. While in the 3rd Regiment Gorman led a detached battalion sometimes referred to as "Gorman's Battalion", Gorman's Battalion consisted of Captain Sluss' Company A.
- John Meek: Served in Company G of the 3rd Indiana and was seriously wounded at Buena Vista. Meek later served in Company H of the 27th Indiana Infantry Regiment during the American Civil War.
- William Monroe McCarty: Served as the regiment's Lieutenant Colonel under Jim Lane.
- Herman H. Barbour: Served as the regiment Adjutant.
- Thomas Ware Gibson: Served as the Captain of Company I. Gibson was later involved in the field of law as a lawyer and later represented the Jeffersonville, Madison and Indianapolis Railroad.
- Horace Hull: Served as the First Lieutenant of Company G, he was later promoted to the rank of Captain. Hull later led Company A of the 5th Indiana Volunteers the "Indiana Guards" of Vernon and Jennings County.

== See also ==
- List of United States military and volunteer units in the Mexican–American War
