= Bradford Ripley Alden =

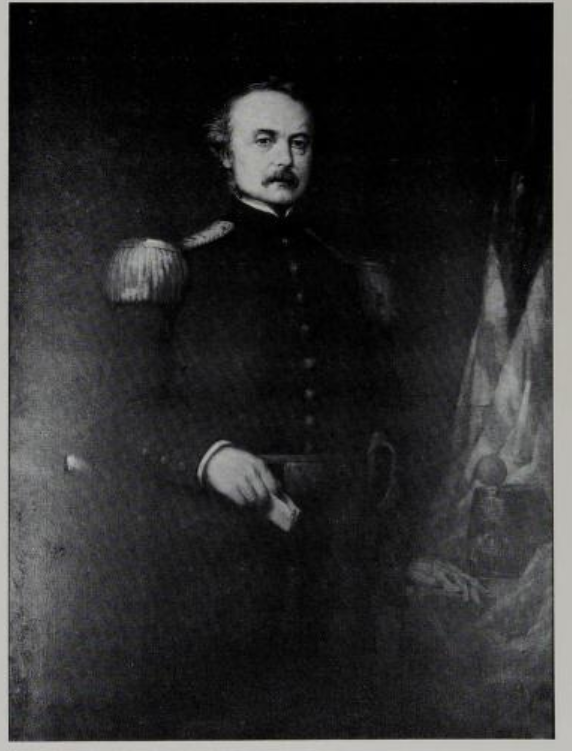
- portrait by John Ferguson Weir
- Born: May 6, 1811; Meadville
- Died: September 10, 1870 (aged 59)
- Resting place: Laurel Hill Cemetery
- Alma mater: United States Military Academy
- Occupation: Officer
- Children: Sarah Coleman Alden
- Parent(s): Roger Alden

Bradford Ripley Alden (May 6, 1811 – September 10, 1870) was the ninth Commandant of the United States Military Academy in West Point, New York.

Bradford Ripley Alden was born on May 6, 1811 in Meadville, Pennsylvania, the son of Roger Alden and the great-great-grandson of John Alden.

After graduation at West Point in 1831, he passed through the usual experiences of young officers in camp and garrison life with the 4th Infantry. He was an instructor at West Point in 1833-'40, and then served for nearly two years as aide to Gen. Scott. After three years of garrison duty he was appointed commandant at West Point, 14 Dec, 1845, and remained there until 1 Nov., 1852. In the frontier service that followed, he led an important expedition against the Rogue River Indians, was severely wounded in action, 24 August 1853, at the Battle of Evans Creek, and resigned in consequence on the 29th of September in the same year. He never fully recovered from his wound, and was unable to serve in the American Civil War. He was a man of fine literary taste and culture, and passed several years of his civil life in Europe.

Bradford Ripley Alden died on 10 September 1870 in Newport, Rhode Island.
