= 2nd Indiana Volunteers =

Military unit in the Mexican–American War

2nd Indiana Volunteers 2nd Indiana Volunteer Infantry Regiment
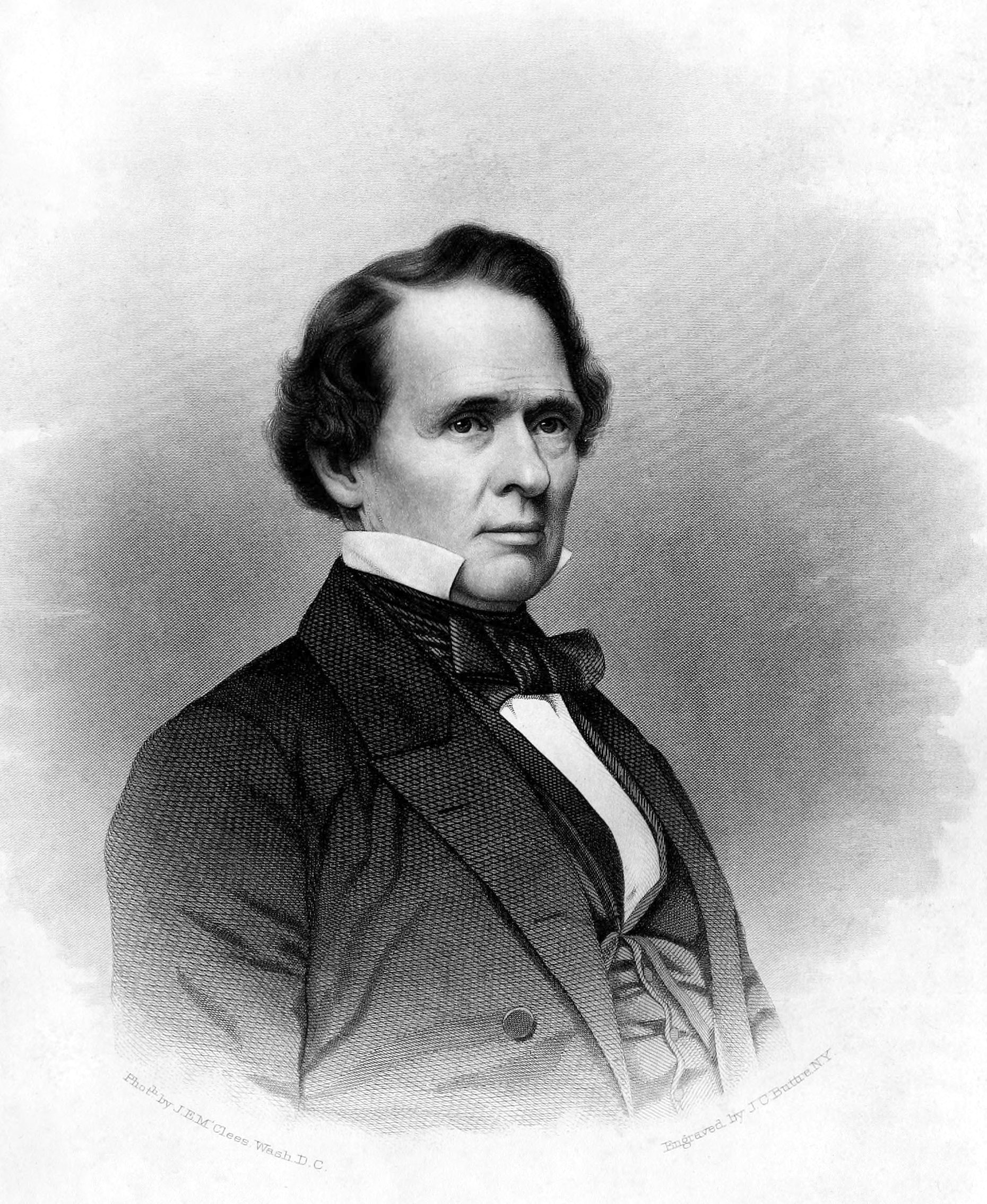
- Joseph Lane, the original commander of the 2nd Indiana c.1860
- Active: May 1846 – June 1847
- Disbanded: June 23, 1847
- Country: United States
- Allegiance: Indiana
- Branch: United States Volunteers
- Type: Infantry
- Size: 853
- Engagements: Mexican-American War Battle of Buena Vista

Commanders
- Colonel: Joseph Lane
- Colonel: William A. Bowles
- Notable commanders: Lovell Harrison Rousseau; Nathan Kimball

The 2nd Indiana Volunteers, also known as the 2nd Indiana Volunteer Infantry Regiment, was an infantry regiment of United States Volunteers from the state of Indiana that participated in the Mexican–American War. The unit was formed and commanded by Joseph Lane in June 1846. The regiment was later commanded by Indiana politician and doctor William A. Bowles of French Lick, Indiana. During the war the unit was part of the "Indiana Brigade" which consisted of the 1st, 2nd, 3rd, 4th, and 5th Indiana regiments. The regiment famously took part in the Battle of Buena Vista from February 22–23, 1847.

== Organization ==
The regiment was organized from May to June 1846 after Governor of Indiana James Whitcomb's call for volunteers for the upcoming war with Mexico. The regiment was mustered into federal service on June 22, 1846, at Camp Whitcomb in New Albany, Indiana. The regiment was organized as follows in June 1846:

Company	Earliest Moniker	Primary Place of Recruitment	Earliest Captain
A	Spencer Greys	Spencer and Owen County	William Lawrence Sanderson
B	Orange County Volunteers or Hoosier Boys	Orange County	William A. Bowles (replaced by Trustin B. Kinder)
C	Clay County Volunteers	Clay County	John Osborn
D	Washington Riflemen	Washington County	Abraham Dennis
E	Greene County Volunteers	Greene County	Lovell Harrison Rousseau
F	Lawrence Greys	Lawrence and Marion County	Henry Davis
G	Captain Kimball's Company or The Posey Guards	Posey County	Nathan Kimball
H	The Sullivan Volunteers	Sullivan and Sullivan County	Joseph W. Briggs
I	Lanesville Legion	Lanesville and Harrison County	Cyrus Gresham
K	Captain Walker's Company or Indiana Riflemen	Vanderburgh County	William Walker

== Service ==
Joseph Lane was originally selected as the regiment's Colonel in June 1846, however, Lane was quickly promoted to the rank of Brigadier General by President of the United States James K. Polk. An election for the regiment's commander was held at Camp Whitcomb in New Albany, the result of which was Captain William Lawrence Sanderson of Company A being elected as Colonel. Captain William Walker's Company K had neglected to vote in the process and thus, the second most popular officer, Captain William A. Bowles was elected as Colonel once the regiment landed on Brazos Island. The regiment left New Albany for New Orleans in early July 1846. The regiment arrived in New Orleans on July 15 and remained there until the 31st. In the meantime, Trustin B. Kinder (1822–1847) of Indianapolis was elected as the Captain of Company B as Bowles' replacement. Kinder would later be killed during the Battle of Buena Vista. the regiment was later ordered to land on Brazos Island on August 29 which it did so alongside the 3rd Indiana Volunteers. The regiment moved to the mouth of the Rio Grande and encamped at Camp Belknap on September 10, 1846. By October 23, 1846, the regiment was still encamped at Camp Belknap near Barita. The regiment was ordered to proceed to Monterey in late November 1846 and arrived at Monterey on December 27, 1846. The 2nd Indiana proceeded to Camp Butler near Saltillo where it encamped on January 1, 1847. The regiment would end up occupying Saltillo until later January when it was ordered to Coahuila.

=== Role in the Battle of Buena Vista ===
During the Battle of Buena Vista the 2nd Indiana was part of Joseph Lane's "Indiana Brigade". The Indiana Brigade consisted of troops from the following units;

- 2nd Infantry Regiment of Indiana Volunteers.
- 3rd Infantry Regiment of Indiana Volunteers.
- The Mississippi Rifles.
- Captain Enoch Steen's Squadron of the 1st Regiment of Dragoons.
- Lieutenant Colonel Charles A. May's squadron of the 2nd Regiment of Dragoons.
- Light Artillery Batteries of Captains Thomas W. Sherman and Braxton Bragg.

The 2nd Indiana was accompanied on the far left flank by the 2nd Regiment of Illinois Volunteers under the command of Colonel William H. Bissell. The book The Mexican War by Jack K. Bower describes the attack of the 2nd Indiana at the Battle of Buena Vista as follows:

"The point of contact between this mass of 7,000 Mexicans and the American line was the ground held by the 2d Indiana and O’Brien’s three guns. When the Mexican plan became clear, Wool sent Colonel Sylvester Churchill to warn General Lane and order the Hoosiers to hold at all costs. Lane, probably prematurely, responded by ordering O’Brien forward with Bowles’s regiment in support. The combined fire of the Hoosiers and O’Brien’s guns from the front and that of the 2d Illinois and Sherman’s battery on the flank tore gaps in the Mexican lines but could not stop the advance. The advance had brought the Hoosiers under the fire not only of the Mexican batteries but of the advancing troops. In order to put his men in a better position to halt the advance, Lane ordered a second forward move. O’Brien gallantly obeyed, but Colonel Bowles misunderstood the directive and misconstrued O’Brien’s shift. Instead of sending his men forward, Bowles ordered, “Cease fire and retreat.” At this the regiment, which had already taken about ninety casualties, broke and fled. Some 200 men were rallied by Bowles and other officers, but O’Brien was left without support. He had to withdraw also, losing a 4-pounder in the process".

Despite these misinterpreted orders by Bowles, several companies of the regiment stood their ground alongside the Mississippi Rifles commanded by future President of the Confederate States of America Jefferson Davis. The book The Mexican War: a History of its Origin, and a Detailed Account of the Victories by Edward Deering Mansfield describes some of the Hoosiers who fought with the Mississippians stating:

"The Second Indiana regiment, which had fallen back as stated, could not be rallied, and took no farther part in the action, except a handful of men, who, under its gallant colonel, Bowles, joined the Mississippi regiment, and did good service, and those fugitives who, at a later period in the day, assisted in defending the train and depot at Buena Vista".

Following the Battle of Buena Vista the regiment lost 10 Officers and 56 Enlisted men killed in action and mortally wounded and 4 Enlisted men missing in action. The regiment was eventually sent back to New Orleans in May 1847 where it was then mustered out of federal service from June 24–27, 1847, in New Orleans. The singular companies of the regiment were still recognized as an independent militia companies after the war and would later form the basis and foundation for the creation of the 6th Indiana Infantry Regiment at the beginning of the American Civil War.

== Legacy ==
One of the regiment's national flags (Stars and Stripes flag) along with two of the regiment's regimental colors are held by the Indiana War Memorial Museum in Indianapolis.

== Notable people ==
- William A. Bowles: Bowles was Lane's appointed replacement as the Colonel of the regiment and served with the regiment during its deployment to Mexico. Bowles was later a Peace Democrat or "Copperhead" politician during the American Civil War.
- Nathan Kimball: Served as the Captain of the "Posey Guards" of Posey County, Indiana. Kimball later famously led the 14th Indiana Infantry Regiment or the "Gallant 14th" during the Maryland campaign.
- Joseph Lane: Served as the original Colonel of the regiment before being promoted to General.
- John Osborn: Served as the Captain of Company C, the "Clay County Volunteers". Osborn served Indiana House of Representatives from 1839 to 1840. At the Battle of Buena Vista Osborn was wounded in the left knee. Osborn later commanded the 31st Indiana Infantry Regiment during the American Civil War.
- Lovell Harrison Rousseau: Served as the Captain of Company D during the war. Lovell later commanded the 5th Kentucky Infantry Regiment during the American Civil War.
- William Lawrence Sanderson: Served as the original Captain of Company A. Sanderson was later promoted to the rank of Colonel and commanded the 23rd Indiana Infantry Regiment during the American Civil War.
