= Battle of Evans Creek =

- Part of the Indian Wars; preliminary conflict of Rogue River Wars
Date	August 24, 1853
Location	West Branch Evans Creek (present day Shady Cove, Oregon)
Result	U.S. victory; Tututni seek peace treaty

Commanders and leaders
Joseph Lane; Bradford R. Alden	Apserkahar "Chief Jo", Toquahear "Chief Sam", Anachaara "Chief Jim"

Units involved
Oregon Territory militia: Rhodes' company; Goodall's company; 4th U.S. Infantry: 10-man detachment	200 Tututni (Rogue River Indians) warriors

Casualties and losses
3 killed 5 wounded (one mortally)	8 killed 20 wounded (7 mortally)

The Battle of Evans Creek took place in Southwest Oregon in 1853. The U.S. victory brought about a short-lived peace in the Rogue River Valley.

== Battle ==
Nomadic bands of Rogue River Indians had been raiding settlements in Southwest Oregon causing settlers to retaliate occasionally targeting innocent tribes. When several tribes grew tired of the retaliations they joined together under Apserkahar (nicknamed "Chief Jo"). Captain Bradford R. Alden brought a small detachment of 10 soldiers of the 4th U.S. Infantry from Fort Jones, California. Along the way Alden collected volunteers from Yreka, California and further volunteers from Oregon Territory. Before Alden could mount an effective offensive, Chief Toquahear ("Chief Sam") forced a small detachment of California volunteers to retreat and inflicting 8 casualties. In Jacksonville, Oregon Alden met up with two more companies of Oregon volunteers under General Joseph Lane. Lane then assumed command of the expedition.

Lane divided the force into two battalions under Colonel John E. Ross and Alden, now using a ceremonious title of "Colonel". Lane would accompany Aldon's battalion (composed of two Oregon companies under Jacob Rhodes and James P. Goodall) toward Table Rock to rendezvous with Colonel Ross at a designated point on Evans Creek.

Four days into the expedition, Alden's battalion encountered the warriors' camp. Alden proceeded dismounted with Goodall's company while Rhodes' company made a flanking maneuver to the left. The warriors were well supplied and their camp sufficiently guarded with log breastworks. Goodall's company skirmished through thick forest while Lane personally brought reserves forward. When he arrived on the field Lane found Alden severely wounded and continued the attack himself. The soldiers came as close as 30 yards to the warriors camp when Lane too was wounded. The battle lines held for another 3 hours until a message was delivered that the Natives wanted to cease fire and make peace. Even though Lane's other battalion arrived on the field, Colonel Ross was urged not to renew the fighting.

Lane concealed his wounded shoulder and entered the warriors' camp and spoke with Chief Jo. He was surprised to see the warriors well armed and supplied but was informed the chiefs were tired of war. The chiefs agreed to meet again several days later at Table Rock where they signed the Treaty of Table Rock.
