= Governor Black =

Governor Black may refer to:

- Frank S. Black (1853–1913), Governor of New York, U.S.
- James D. Black (1849–1938), Governor of Kentucky, U.S.
- Robin Black (colonial administrator) (1906–1999), Governor of Singapore and Hong Kong
- Samuel W. Black (1816–1862), Governor of Nebraska Territory, U.S.
