= Siege of Puebla =

Several battles and sieges took place around the city of Puebla in Mexico:

- The Siege of Puebla (1847) during the Mexican–American War;
- The Siege of Puebla (1863) during the French intervention in Mexico.
