= Samuel Thurston =

American pioneer, lawyer and politician (1816–1851)

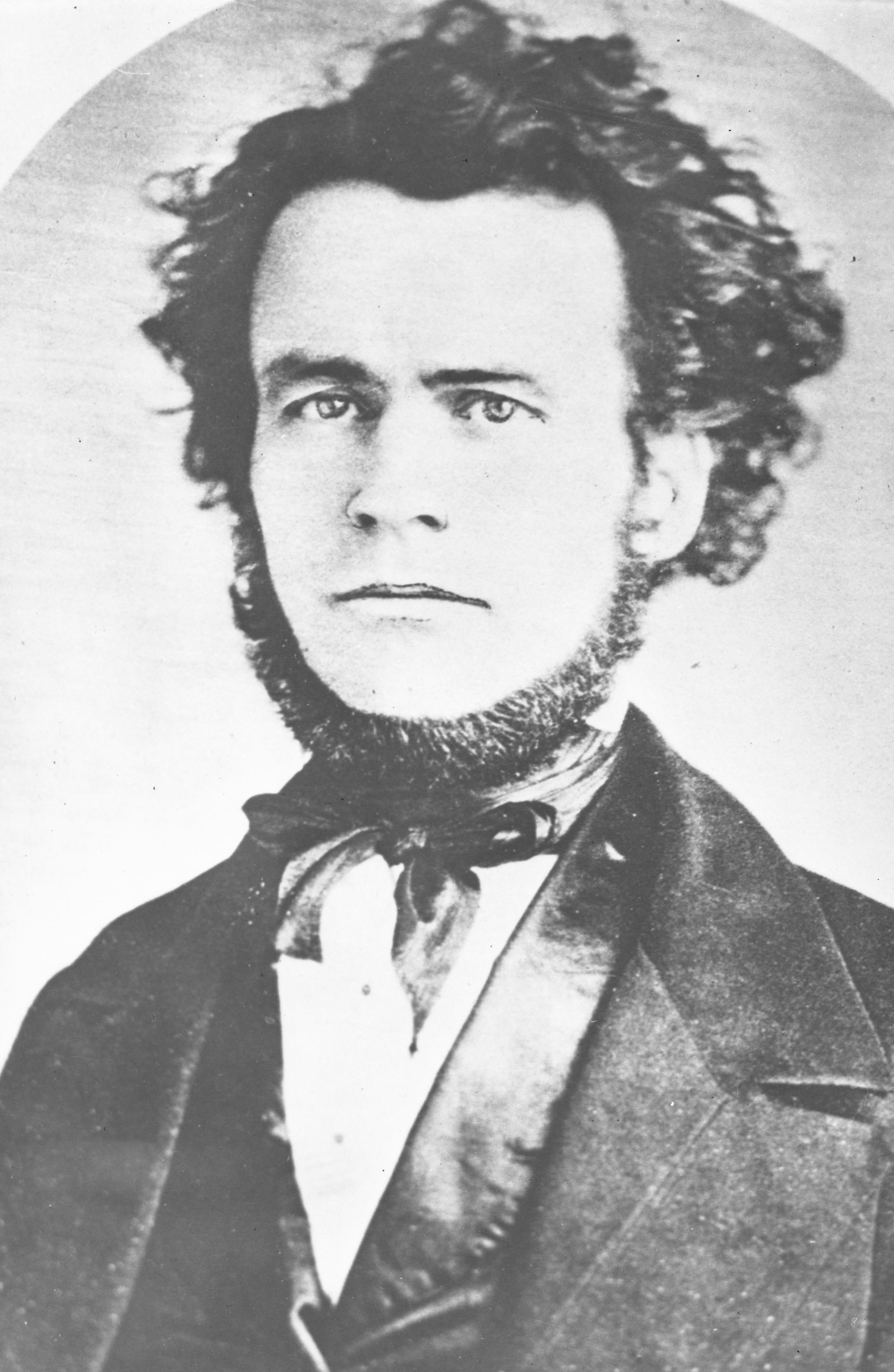
- Thurston circa 1845

Delegate to the U.S. House of Representatives from the Oregon Territory's at-large district
- In office December 3, 1849 – March 3, 1851
- Preceded by: Constituency established
- Succeeded by: Joseph Lane

Personal details
- Born: Samuel Royal Thurston; April 15, 1816 Monmouth, Maine, U.S.
- Died: April 6, 1851 (aged 34) At sea off Acapulco, Mexico
- Party: Democratic
- Education: Dartmouth College; Bowdoin College (BA)

Samuel Royal Thurston (April 15, 1816 – April 9, 1851) was an American pioneer, lawyer and politician. He was the first delegate from the Oregon Territory to the United States Congress and was instrumental in the passage of the Donation Land Claim Act.

== Biography ==
=== Early years ===
Thurston was born in Monmouth, Maine, and grew up in Peru, Maine; his father died when he was young. After attending Dartmouth College, he graduated in 1843 from Bowdoin College in Maine, graduating with honors. He then studied law under Robert Dunlap. Thurston met Elizabeth McLench in college and married her after graduating. The couple moved to Burlington, Iowa in 1845.

Thurston came to the Oregon Country in 1847 as an emigrant over the Oregon Trail. In Oregon he settled in Hillsboro, where he practiced law. Then in 1848 he was elected to the Provisional Legislature from Tuality District where he served with fellow Hillsboro resident David Hill. In 1849, Thurston was selected to represent the Oregon Territory in the U.S. Congress.

=== Political career ===
In the struggle for the control of Oregon lands, Thurston was an ally of Jason Lee against John McLoughlin, the chief of the Hudson's Bay Company at Fort Vancouver who Thurston, for shamefully political reasons, accused of helping thwart settlement in the territory. As Congressional delegate, Thurston authored the Donation Land Claim Act so as to give McLoughlin's HBC claim to the state legislature. Thurston and Lee made false statements about McLoughlin before the United States Supreme Court in an effort to publicly discredit him. The statements resulted in the denial of McLoughlin's land claims to his homestead in Oregon City.

Thurston's major political achievement was in helping pass the Donation Land Claim Act in 1850. The act legitimized existing land claims in the Oregon Territory and granted 640 acres (2.6 km²) to each married couple who would settle and cultivate the land for four years. The act is considered a forerunner of the 1862 Homestead Act.

In 1850 he wrote an address to Congress urging the prohibition of free African-Americans from the Oregon Territory, in which he said:

[It] is a question of life or death to us in Oregon. The negroes associate with the Indians and intermarry, and, if their free ingress is encouraged or allowed, there would a relationship spring up between them and the different tribes, and a mixed race would ensure inimical to the whites; and the Indians being led on by the negro who is better acquainted with the customs, language, and manners of the whites, than the Indian, these savages would become much more formidable than they otherwise would, and long bloody wars would be the fruits of the comingling of the races. It is the principle of self preservation that justifies the actions of the Oregon legislature.

In order to prevent employees of the Hudson's Bay Company from claiming land in the Oregon Territory, Thurston advocated for the Donation Land Claim Act to only allow land claims by American citizens. Thurston singled out indigenous Hawaiian HBC employees in particular, calling them "a race of men as black as your negroes of the South, and a race, too, that we do not desire to settle in Oregon." Thurston added that white men who left the Hudson's Bay Company and became American citizens should be eligible for land claims, but that Hawaiian men should not be eligible.

=== Death and legacy ===
While returning to Oregon via Panama, Thurston died of the effects of a tropical fever off Acapulco, Mexico while aboard the steamer California. According to a contemporary obituary:

He died on the 9th [of April 1851] ... eight days from Panama ... His arduous labors at Washington had prepared his system for an attack of the malignant fever incident to the Isthmus, from the effects of which he had not recovered before experiencing a severe attack of diarrhea, which, together with an affection of the liver, under which he had sometime labored, terminated his earthly existence.

Thurston's body was originally interred in Acapulco, but his remains were brought to Oregon two years later by an act of the Oregon Legislature. His body was reburied in the Salem Pioneer Cemetery in Salem. The inscription reads: "Here rests Oregon's first delegate, a man of genius and learning. A lawyer and statesman. His devotions equaled his wide philanthropy, his public acts are his best eulogium."

Thurston County, Washington, originally part of the Oregon Territory and now containing the state capital of Washington (Olympia), was named in his honor.

U.S. House of Representatives
| New constituency | Delegate to the U.S. House of Representatives from the Oregon Territory's at-large congressional district 1849–1851 | Succeeded by Joseph Lane |
