= 62nd Pennsylvania Infantry Regiment =

Union Army infantry regiment

62nd Pennsylvania Volunteer Infantry
- Active: July 4, 1861 – August 15, 1864
- Country: United States of America
- Allegiance: Union
- Branch: Infantry
- Engagements: Siege of Yorktown; Battle of Hanover Court House; Seven Days Battles; Battle of Beaver Dam Creek; Battle of Gaines's Mill; Battle of Savage's Station; Battle of Malvern Hill; Second Battle of Bull Run; Battle of Antietam; Battle of Fredericksburg; Battle of Chancellorsville; Battle of Gettysburg; Bristoe Campaign; Mine Run Campaign; Battle of the Wilderness; Battle of Spotsylvania Court House; Battle of North Anna; Battle of Totopotomoy Creek; Battle of Cold Harbor; Siege of Petersburg

The 62nd Pennsylvania Volunteer Infantry was an infantry regiment that served in the Union Army during the American Civil War.

== Service ==
The 62nd Pennsylvania Infantry was organized at Pittsburgh, Pennsylvania beginning on July 4, 1861 and mustered in on August 31, 1861, as the 33rd Pennsylvania Regiment for a three-year enlistment under the command of Colonel Samuel W. Black. Its designation was changed to the 62nd Pennsylvania Infantry on November 18, 1861.

The regiment was attached to Morrell's Brigade, Fitz John Porter's Division, Army of the Potomac, to March 1862. 2nd Brigade, 1st Division, III Corps, Army of the Potomac, to May 1862. 2nd Brigade, 1st Division, V Corps, to July 1864.

The 62nd Pennsylvania Infantry mustered out August 15, 1864. Companies L and M were transferred to the 91st Pennsylvania Infantry. Veterans and recruits were transferred to the 155th Pennsylvania Infantry.

== Detailed service ==
Left Pennsylvania for Washington, D.C., August 31, 1861. Camp near Fort Corcoran, defenses of Washington, D.C., until October 1861, and near Fall's Church, Va., until March 1862. Moved to the Peninsula March 22–24. Reconnaissance to Big Bethel March 30. Howard's Mills, near Cockletown, April 4. Warwick Road April 5. Siege of Yorktown April 5 – May 4. Hanover Court House May 27. Operations about Hanover Court House May 27–29. Seven Days before Richmond June 25 – July 1. Battles of Mechanicsville June 26; Gaines's Mill June 27; Savage Station June 29; Turkey Bridge or Malvern Cliff June 30; Malvern Hill July 1. At Harrison's Landing until August 16. Movement to Fort Monroe, then to Centreville August 16–28. Second Battle of Bull Run August 30. Battle of Antietam September 16–17. Shepherdstown Ford September 19. Blackford's Ford September 19. Reconnaissance to Smithfield October 16–17. Battle of Fredericksburg December 12–15. Expedition to Richard's and Ellis' Fords, Rappahannock River, December 30–31. Burnside's second Campaign, "Mud March," January 20–24, 1863. At Falmouth until April. Chancellorsville Campaign April 27 – May 6. Battle of Chancellorsville May 1–5. Middleburg June 19. Upperville June 21. Battle of Gettysburg July 1–3. Pursuit of Lee July 5–24. Duty on line of the Rappahannock until October. Bristoe Campaign October 9–22. Advance to line of the Rappahannock November 7–8. Rappahannock Station November 7. Mine Run Campaign November 26 – December 2. Duty at Bealeton Station until May 1864. Rapidan Campaign May 4 – June 12. Battle of the Wilderness May 5–7. Laurel Hill May 8. Spotsylvania May 8–12. Spotsylvania Court House May 12–21. Assault on the Salient May 12. North Anna River May 23–26. Jericho Ford May 25. Line of the Pamunkey May 26–28. Totopotomoy May 28–31. Cold Harbor June 1–12. Bethesda Church June 1–3. Before Petersburg June 16–18. Siege of Petersburg until July 3. Left front July 3.

== Casualties ==
The regiment lost a total of 258 men during service; 17 officers and 152 enlisted men killed or mortally wounded, 89 enlisted men died of disease. The 62d was one of only 14 Union regiments with 17 or more officers who were killed or mortally wounded in battle.

== Commanders ==
- Colonel Samuel W. Black – killed in action at the Battle of Gaines's Mill
- Colonel Jacob B. Sweitzer
- Lieutenant Colonel James C. Hull

== Notable members ==
- Private Philip M. Shannon, Company C – oil tycoon

== See also ==
- List of Pennsylvania Civil War Units
- Pennsylvania in the Civil War
