= Battle Creek (Evans Creek tributary) =

- Location within Oregon Location within the United States

Physical characteristics
- Source
  - coordinates: 42.6331774°N 123.1111664°W
- Mouth
  - coordinates: 42.6192893°N 123.0436638°W

Battle Creek is a stream in the U.S. state of Oregon. It is a tributary to Evans Creek.

Battle Creek was named for a skirmish (Battle of Evans Creek) fought by a local militia against Native Americans.
