= Oregon Territory's at-large congressional district =

Oregon Territory's defunct congressional district

Coordinates: 45°N 117.5°W

- Obsolete district
- Created: 1848, as a non-voting delegate was granted by Congress
- Eliminated: 1859, as a result of statehood
- Years active: 1848–1859

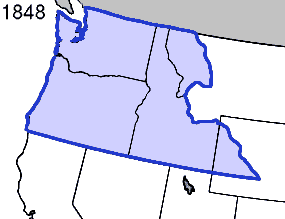
Oregon Territory, as originally organized, in 1848

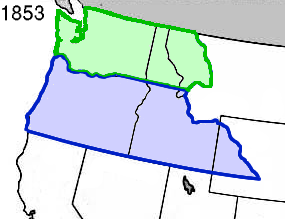
Oregon Territory (blue) with Washington Territory (green) in 1853

Oregon Territory's at-large congressional district is an obsolete congressional district that encompassed the area of the Oregon Territory. In 1853, the northern half of the territory was reorganized into the Washington Territory.

After Oregon's admission to the Union as the 33rd state by act of Congress on February 14, 1859, this district was dissolved and replaced by Oregon's at-large congressional district. At the same time, the eastern portion of the territory was annexed to the Washington Territory.

== List of delegates representing the district ==
When the Oregon Territory was formed on August 14, 1848, Congress gave it the authority to elect a Congressional delegate, though the first delegate did not take his seat until 1849.

Delegate (Residence)	Party	Years	Cong ress	Electoral history
Samuel Thurston (Linn City)	Democratic	December 3, 1849 – March 3, 1851	31st	Elected in 1849; Died April 9, 1851.
Joseph Lane (Oregon City, Winchester)	Democratic	March 4, 1851 – February 14, 1859	32nd 33rd 34th 35th	Elected in 1851; Elected in 1853; Elected in 1855; Elected in 1857; Retired to run for U.S. senator upon statehood.
