= Philip M. Shannon =

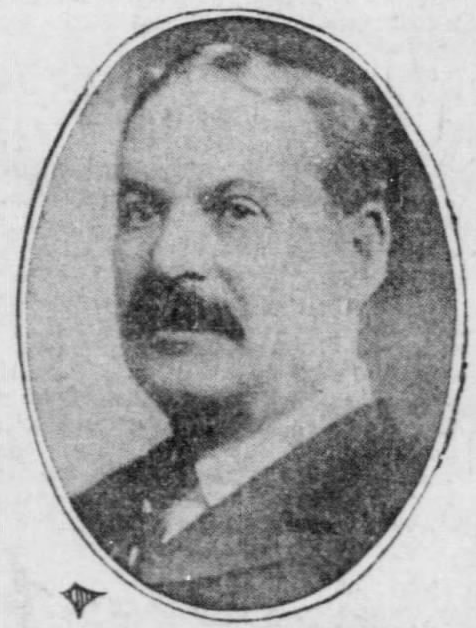

Personal details
- Born: Philip Martin Shannon; September 2, 1846 Bradford, Pennsylvania, U.S.
- Died: November 22, 1915 (aged 69) Pittsburgh, Pennsylvania, U.S.
- Party: Republican
- Spouse: Hattie M. McIntosh

Military service
- Allegiance: United States
- Branch/service: Union Army
- Years of service: 1861-1862
- Unit: 62nd Pennsylvania Infantry Regiment
- Battles/wars: American Civil War

Philip Martin Shannon (September 2, 1846 – November 22, 1915) was an American politician, businessman, millionaire, and soldier who discovered oil in Wyoming.

== Life ==
Philip Martin Shannon was born in 1843, in Bradford, Pennsylvania and during his childhood he worked on the oil fields during the early Pennsylvania oil rush. He discovered the Shannon Oil fields, which were named in his honor, in the early 1880s and gained controlling oil interests in Texas and Alabama oil fields. In 1861, he enlisted into the 62nd Pennsylvania Infantry Regiment, but was later honorably discharged in 1862 due to wounds he received from the Battle of Gaines's Mill. In 1874, he was elected as the Burgess of Millerstown and in 1876 ran for a seat in the Pennsylvania legislature, but did not receive the Republican nomination at the state convention. On June 18, 1881, he married Hattie M. McIntosh and in 1885, he was elected as mayor of Bradford.

In 1884, he visited Wyoming and in 1889, he discovered oil in Wyoming at the Salt Creek Oil Field and later built an oil refinery in 1894. In 1900, Harry Oscar Lordon, a veteran of the Spanish–American War, attempted to rob Shannon and was found underneath his bed in the Waldorf-Astoria hotel. On November 22, 1915, he died in his Duquesne Club apartment in Pittsburgh, Pennsylvania.
