= Samuel W. Black =

American territorial governor of Nebraska (1816–1862)

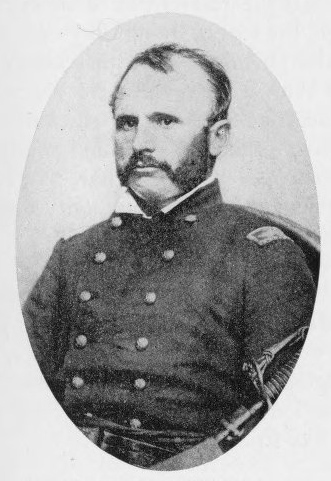

Governor of Nebraska Territory
- In office May 2, 1859 – February 24, 1861
- Appointed by: James Buchanan
- Preceded by: J. Sterling Morton (acting)
- Succeeded by: J. Sterling Morton (acting)

Personal details
- Born: Samuel Wylie Black; September 3, 1816 Pittsburgh, Pennsylvania, U.S.
- Died: June 27, 1862 (aged 45) Hanover County, Virginia, U.S.
- Party: Democratic
- Spouse: Eliza Irwin
- Education: Western University of Pennsylvania

Military service
- Allegiance: United States
- Branch/service: United States Army
- Rank: Colonel
- Battles/wars: Mexican–American War; American Civil War

Samuel Wylie Black (September 3, 1816 – June 27, 1862) was a lawyer, soldier, judge, and politician. A Democrat closely involved in Pennsylvania politics, he is best known for being the 7th Governor of the Nebraska Territory and for being killed in action leading his regiment in a charge early in the Civil War.

== Youth ==
The son of Rev. John Black, a Covenanter preacher, John Brown Wylie Black was born in Pittsburgh, Pennsylvania, on September 3, 1816. He was the sixth of nine children. Black and his father exhibited a great love for each other, as seen in letters written in later years, but the younger Black had a rebellious streak as well. When he was told by his father that the circus was a wicked place and threatened with a thrashing if he went to it, Sam reflected and then replied, "I've decided. I will go to the circus and take the thrashing." In contrast to his dour father's strict discipline and devout faith, Sam never joined the church and was known for his pranks and good humor. He graduated from the Western University of Pennsylvania, known today as the University of Pittsburgh, in 1834. While at the university, he was a classmate, academic rival, and close friend of Thomas Mellon. After graduation, Black studied the law with Richard Biddle, a former member of Congress, and perhaps as well with Judge Thomas Mifflin Irwin, both a former member of Congress and a federal judge. Black was admitted to the bar in 1838 and married Irwin's daughter Eliza soon after.

== Career in the Law ==
Sam Black and Thomas Mellon, who had been admitted to the bar the year before, became professional rivals almost immediately. Both were bright, ambitious, and successful. Their rivalry, however, stemmed from differing approaches to the law as well as personality. Black was eloquent, impulsive, and passionate, and not afraid to captivate and misdirect a jury. In contrast, Mellon took a more studious approach. He spoke less expressively but tried to let the facts win an argument. Mellon found, however, that he could best counter Black's eloquence with ridicule, and after an exchange in open court that led to an outbreak of temper from both men, their friendship turned to hostility. The enmity only ended on the eve of the Mexican War when Black sought out Mellon to renew the friendship, saying "Mellon, let us make it up! I may never see you again." Their rekindled alliance lasted until Black's death.

== Mexican War ==
Black served as lieutenant-colonel of the First Pennsylvania Volunteers during the Mexican–American War. After Colonel Francis W. Wynkoop left the regiment to become Governor of the military district of Perote, Black took command of the First Pennsylvania Infantry. Late in the war, anxious to fight, Black became furious when the First Pennsylvania was ordered by General Winfield Scott to remain in the city of Puebla to protect a garrison, while the army began its final assault on Mexico City. Black appealed the decision to no avail and then offered his resignation. General Scott refused to accept it, but assured Black that he would still have opportunity to see action. Scott was correct. On September 14, 1847, the same day that Mexico City fell, the garrison of fewer than 500 soldiers, not including 1,800 sick and wounded, at Puebla was surrounded by 4,000 Mexican soldiers. General Joaquín Rea, under orders of General Antonio López de Santa Anna, commanded a force of regular soldiers and guerrillas. The American force held three strongpoints within the city: a convent, Fort Loretto, and the citadel of San José. The full garrison was under command of Lieutenant Colonel Thomas Childs, and Lieutenant-Colonel Black was placed in charge of the citadel of San José, which also served as a temporary hospital. The siege lasted for 28 days, during which it was under a constant barrage of bullets. After several weeks, the divided garrison came close to running out of food. When news of the siege reached General Scott, he ordered Brigadier General Joseph Lane to lead a relief force to save Puebla. On October 9, the federal force reached Huamantla, a small city 25 miles from Puebla where the bulk of Santa Anna's force was waiting. After Santa Anna's army was defeated at the Battle of Huamantla, Lane's troops were able to disperse the remnant of the siege force surrounding Puebla, fight their way into the city, and lift the siege.

Childs praised Black for his leadership during the siege with these words, "From Lieutenant-Colonel Black, the immediate commander of San Jose, and his officers, I have received the most cordial support. Colonel Black, for more than thirty days, was untiring in his efforts and zeal for the safety of that point. Officers and men were at the posts night and day, without regarding the pelting storm; and I cannot say too much in praise of the gallant colonel, his officers and men, before and during the siege."

== Political career ==
A lifelong Democrat, Black ran and lost in 1852 for Representative from Pennsylvania to the U.S. House. He moved to Nebraska and in 1857 was appointed United States Judge of the Nebraska Territory by President James Buchanan. He was appointed Governor of the Nebraska Territory in 1859. His most controversial action as governor was to veto on January 9, 1860, the Act to Prohibit Slavery. He was accused of being a pro-South Democrat, but Black claimed he believed the wording of the bill was unconstitutional. The territorial legislature overrode the veto, and slavery was outlawed in Nebraska. When Republican Abraham Lincoln was elected President, Democrat Sam Black resigned. There is no evidence of specific pressure exerted on him to resign, but territorial governorships were a hallmark of the patronage system of the era, and Black was part of the system. He resigned in February (before Lincoln took office), but seems to have stayed in Nebraska until June, 1861, when Black returned home to Pittsburgh.

== Civil War ==
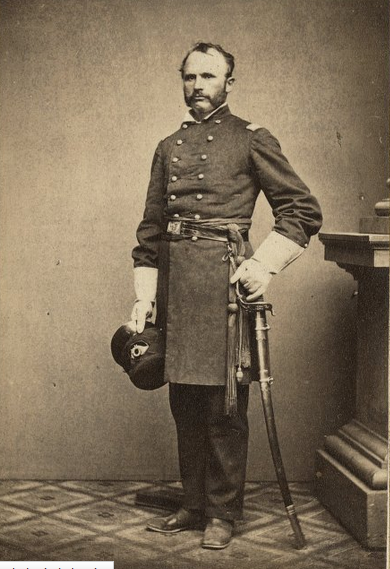

Black returned to Pittsburgh to take command of the Union Army's 62nd Pennsylvania Infantry made up of three-year volunteers, the first to leave the city to fight in the Civil War. Black was an eager commander, who died early in the war. During the Peninsula Campaign, the Sixty Second Pennsylvania Infantry was part of Charles Griffin's brigade of George W. Morell's division of the V Corps. Having led his regiment as part of a counter-offensive that turned the tide of the Battle of Hanover Court House, Black went on to distinguish himself at the Battle of Beaver Dam Creek on June 26, 1862, leading his regiment with that fervor and enthusiasm as they held their position. At the Battle of Gaines's Mill, the following day, Morrell's division had the left of the line, where a slope reached down to the Chickahominy, and Griffin's brigade saw action as the battle opened by the advance of Longstreet's corps on their flank. The Sixty-second Pennsylvania and the Ninth Massachusetts were ordered to advance and charged across a ravine to their front. They gained the woods on the opposite side, but while making the charge, before reaching the woods, Colonel Black was killed.

== See also ==
- History of slavery in Nebraska

Preceded by Thomas B. Cuming	Governors of Nebraska Territory; May 2, 1859 – February 24, 1861	Succeeded by Thomas B. Cuming
