= Willis A. Gorman =

American general, politician and lawyer

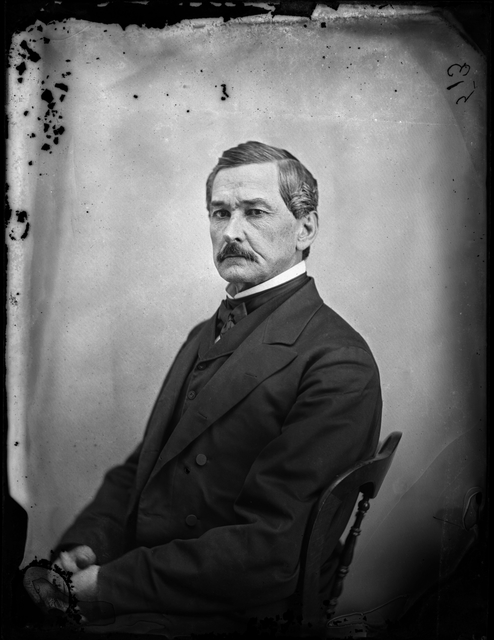
- Gorman in 1865

2nd Territorial Governor of Minnesota
- In office May 15, 1853 – April 23, 1857
- Appointed by: Franklin Pierce
- Preceded by: Alexander Ramsey
- Succeeded by: Samuel Medary

Member of the U.S. House of Representatives from Indiana's 6th district
- In office March 4, 1849 – March 3, 1853
- Preceded by: George G. Dunn
- Succeeded by: Thomas A. Hendricks

Member of the Indiana House of Representatives
- In office 1841–1844

Personal details
- Born: Willis Arnold Gorman; January 12, 1816 Flemingsburg, Kentucky, U.S.
- Died: May 20, 1876 (aged 60) Saint Paul, Minnesota, U.S.
- Resting place: Oakland Cemetery, Saint Paul, Minnesota
- Party: Democratic
- Spouse: Martha Stone (m. 1836)
- Profession: lawyer and politician

Military service
- Allegiance: United States
- Branch/service: United States Army; Union Army
- Years of service: 1846–1848; 1861–1864
- Rank: Brigadier General
- Unit: 3rd Indiana Volunteers
- Commands: 4th Indiana Infantry Regiment; 1st Minnesota Infantry; 1st Bde, 2nd Div, II Corps
- Battles/wars: Mexican–American War; American Civil War

Willis Arnold Gorman (January 12, 1816 – May 20, 1876) was an American lawyer, soldier, politician, and a general in the Union Army during the American Civil War.

== Biography ==
Gorman was born near Flemingsburg, Kentucky. He was the only child of David and Elizabeth Gorman, both of Irish descent. In 1835, the family moved to Bloomington, Indiana, where Gorman attended Indiana University and then established a law practice. In January 1836, he married Martha Stone in Bloomington. By 1837 he began his move into politics, becoming a clerk in the Indiana State Senate. From 1841 to 1844, he was elected to the Indiana House of Representatives.

In 1845 he returned to Indiana University and completed his law degree. In 1846 he volunteered for the army, enlisted as a private, and went to fight in the Mexican–American War. He was appointed as a major in the 3rd Indiana Volunteer Infantry, and led an independent rifle battalion at the Battle of Buena Vista, where he was severely wounded. When his term of service expired, he re-enlisted and was appointed colonel of the 4th Indiana Infantry Regiment. He served in the capture of Huamantla and in several other campaigns and battles under General Joseph Lane. In 1848 he was civil and military governor of Puebla, but soon after he returned to Indiana. He served in the United States House of Representatives from March 4, 1849, to March 3, 1853, as a representative of that state.

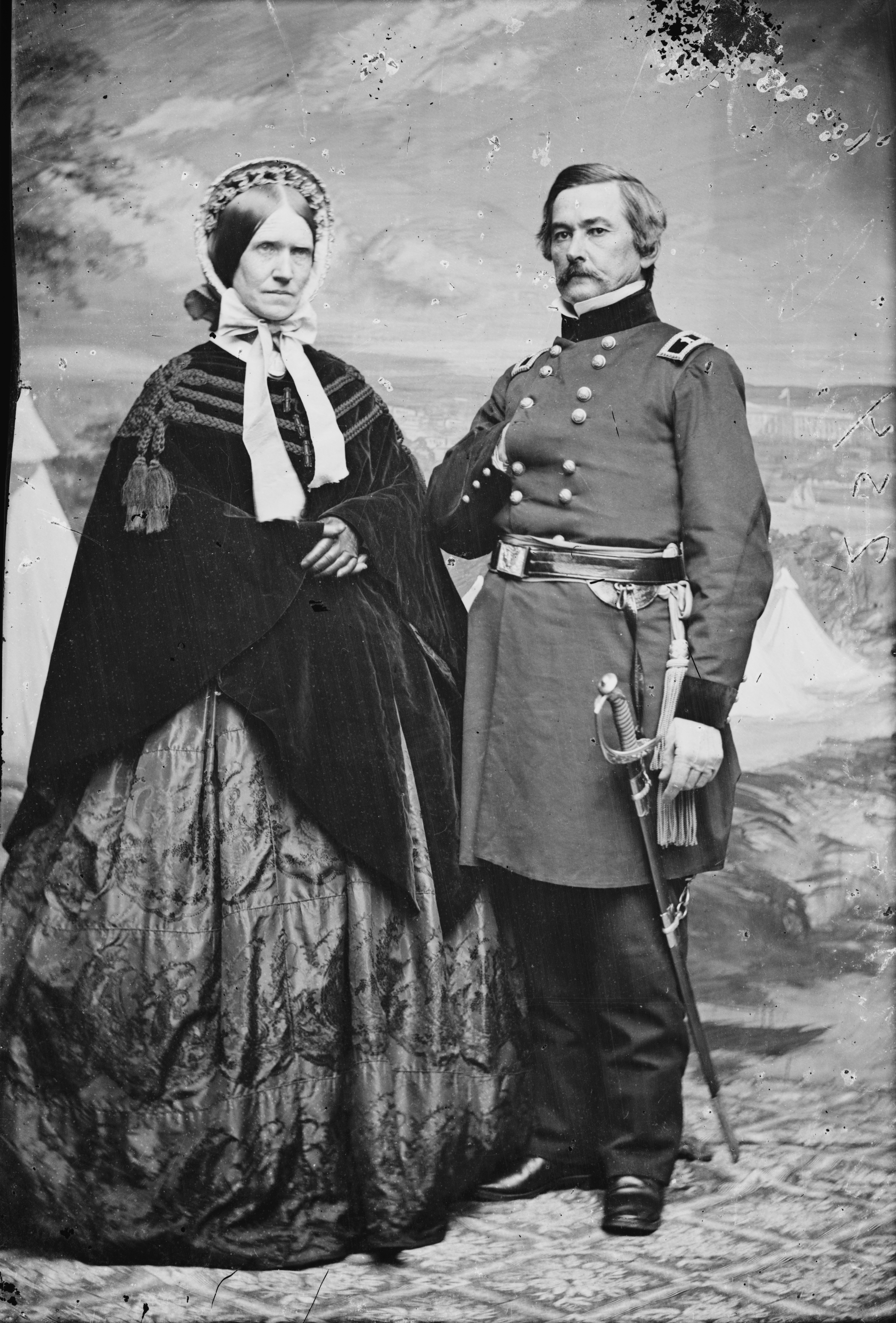
Willis Gorman and Martha Stone.

=== As governor ===
Gorman, politically a Democrat, served as the second Territorial Governor of Minnesota from May 15, 1853, to April 23, 1857, at the appointment of President Franklin Pierce. During his time as Governor of Minnesota, he masterminded an unsuccessful plan to move the capital of the territory from St. Paul to St. Peter, where he owned land that would have been eminently suitable for use as the new capitol grounds. The plan was sidetracked when legislator Joe Rolette disappeared with the bill until the last seconds of the legislative session. A copy was made for Gorman, which he signed, however the capitol could not be moved without a statewide referendum anyways.

In 1854, Gorman issued a pardon for Louis Monroe, an African American man convicted of assault with a deadly weapon. He stated that the jury "simply got the case wrong." The pardon held, but it became hotly debated in local newspapers whether the territorial governor had this power, and whether it should be used.

=== Post governorship & civil war ===
He spent a number of years practicing law in St. Paul, Minnesota, and served in the Minnesota House of Representatives from May 11, 1858, to January 1859.

With the secession of several Southern slave states, Gorman offered his services to the army. He was appointed Colonel of the 1st Minnesota Infantry, serving in the First Battle of Bull Run on July 21, 1861. On September 7, 1861, he was appointed brigadier general of volunteers and assigned to command a brigade in the II Corps in Army of the Potomac during the Peninsular Campaign. His troops suffered high casualties during the Battle of Antietam in an ill-fated attack on Confederate positions in the West Woods. Later in the year, he was assigned to command the District of Eastern Arkansas.

== Postwar ==
In 1864 he left the service and resumed his law practice in St. Paul. He was elected City attorney in 1869, and continued in that position until his death. He is buried in Oakland Cemetery in St. Paul.

== See also ==
- List of American Civil War generals (Union)

Political offices
Preceded by Alexander Ramsey	2nd governor of Minnesota Territory; 1853 – 1857	Succeeded by Samuel Medary
U.S. House of Representatives
Preceded by George G. Dunn	United States House of Representatives from Indiana; 1849 – 1853	Succeeded by Thomas A. Hendricks
