= William Parkhurst Winans =

- Born: January 28, 1836; New Jersey
- Died: April 22, 1917 (aged 81)
- Occupation: Banker

William Parkhurst Winans (January 28, 1836– April 22, 1917) was crucial for the development of parts of Eastern Washington, particularly Stevens County, Walla Walla, and Fort Colville. He founded Farmer's Savings Bank, and was the president until he died in 1917. He was also a member of the board of directors of First National Bank. In addition to his involvement with the bank system, Winans was a clerk in several locations throughout the region, and so is personally responsible for the majority of the records of the Colville Indians and others in the region, as well as the records of the financial dealings in the late 19th century and the early 20th century. Winans played an important role in keeping records of Indians because he was named Industrial Instructor for Indians in 1869 and Superintendent of Indian Affairs in 1870. In addition to those offices, Winans took multiple censuses of Indian populations, including the Okanagans, Calispels, San Poils, Nespelems, Senijexsees, Wenatchees, Isle d'Pierres, Mishouies, Spokanes, and the Swielpees. He was a historian himself, and wrote several histories of the region, including a book, Stevens County, Washington, its creation, addition, subtraction and division. Several of his works were given to institutions such as Harvard University and Washington State University. Eastern Washington, particularly Stevens County and Walla Walla, would not be the same if William Parkhurst Winans had not been there with his business and record-keeping skills. As the Old Walla Walla County, Washington records, "No history of Walla Walla would be complete without extended reference to William Parkhurst Winans, who was an octogenarian at the time of his demise. He had long been identified with the northwest, and his life was one of great usefulness and activity." By the end of his life, Winans was an essential part of the Walla Walla community due to his hard work and involvement in the fields of business, education, Indian affairs, and the church.

== Biography ==
William Parkhurst Winans was born in Elizabeth, New Jersey on January 28, 1836. He was one of eight children born to Jonas Wood Winans and Sarah Stiles. Winans arrived in Umatilla River, Oregon in September 1859, and he worked as a warehouseman and a school teacher there until 1861. In July of that year, Winans headed north from Oregon to Fort Colville in Washington. There, he was appointed deputy auditor of Spokane County. The following year he was promoted from deputy auditor to auditor. It was during his time in Colville that Winans began involvement in business in addition to his positions in government. He opened a small general store in Colville with the money he had made in government.

His next government appointment was as the clerk for the United States district court which included Spokane County and Missoula County. His first elected government position was in 1866 as superintendent of schools in Spokane County. He represented Stevens County in meetings of the Washington Territorial Legislature in 1867, 1868 and 1870.

On October 6, 1869, Winans was married to Lida Moore. They had three sons together–Gilbert Park, Phillip Moore, and Allan Lida. Lida died on December 4, 1876. On November 20, 1879, Winans remarried to Christine McRae. They had two surviving children together–Freeman Earl and Sarah Jean.

Winans was named Sub-Indian Agent in 1870 for six tribes residing near Colville that had refused to make treaties with the federal government. He successfully argued against the directive by President Grant to give these tribes rights to lands in Stevens County on which white settlers had already established their homes.

== Business Ventures ==
In 1874 Winans moved from Colville to Walla Walla, Washington. He joined the mercantile firm Johnson, Rees & Co., which was the largest store in Walla Walla at that time. While in Walla Walla, he diversified his business ventures, investing in farming, merchandising, freighting and banking. As he became wealthier, he travelled to the east coast and throughout Europe. He was a very active member of the Walla Walla community, involved in church and business matters. Winans was an elder in Walla Walla Presbyterian Church, and acted as a temporary pastor when the active pastor died until a new pastor arrived. He was on the board of directors for First National Bank of Walla Walla and was President of Farmer's Savings Bank from 1890 until his death in 1917.

William Parkhurst was known as a great business man. During his life he had many accounts with several companies for his business ventures. He started out his career working for the Spokane County Treasurer, and then went in all different directions from there. Winans had many accounts while working for the Spokane County Treasurer, including accounts with Big Bend Mining District, Olf Fort Store notes and accounts, and with the Indian office. From there he went on to deal with Abrams and Co. business, where he dealt with their business trial accounts. Winans was also a lawyer and dealt with the law side of business when he needed to. Winans started a business called Brown and Winans, which gave him more people and accounts to work with. Despite occasional difficulties, Winans did well overall throughout his business career, and was known to all as an astute and hardworking businessman. Writings

== Personal life ==
Winans spent much of his life documenting the world around him. He applied his love for details to all of his business positions as well as to his personal life, thereby leaving us with wonderfully specific records of all of the agencies he worked for. The Washington State University Manuscripts, Archives, and Special Collections has nearly 1000 documents from Winans, most of which include business records and professional correspondence. These documents are a wellspring of information for anyone interested in the Pacific Northwest at the time of Winans' life.

Winans was an amateur historian. He wrote everything down, which proved invaluable for historians following him. Many of the surviving documents include his personal diaries. Winans kept meticulous records of everything he did, including expenditure of funds and day-to-day accounts of his actions. His diaries were incredibly specific, and often contained bits of history that he learned about his surroundings, (even including bits of dried flowers and plants pressed between the pages). One example of his specificity was his trip to Egypt. He spent several weeks in Egypt in 1892, and wrote down everything that he did and learned. On Monday, March 21, 1892, after a trip to an ancient temple, Winans wrote: Capitals as varied as the vegetation of the land and are even now dazzling bright in the many colored hues as when the painter left them, the ceiling is blue with golden stars. But we go farther into the shadowy recesses of the Temple no windows to light, a small opening into each of the three most sacred rooms. This diary entry shows his flair for the dramatic, but also highlights his fascination with history and other cultures. The details are useful for those who wish to learn about the time period in which he lived, because he wrote about the little things that would seem too insignificant to be put in an official record, but that historians later on would still find interesting.

In addition to his personal writings, Winans also wrote for other people. He recorded a biography of Edward Marsden, an Indian of the tribe Metlakatla in Alaska. Winans also wrote a history of Lewis and Clark and trappers in the Pacific Northwest. His goal was to bring to light that which had been previously neglected. He says: And in the settlement of this country, we hear of Parker, Whitman, and others, but no mention of those explorers who first beheld our valley and made it known to the civilized world. My subject will be in relation to them, to Lewis and Clark, who made this country known to the Pioneers about 25 years ago. Winans wanted to ensure that the whole country was aware of the history of the Pacific Northwest, and that credit was given where it was due for settling it. His histories of Northwestern people are valuable for modern-day folk because they show the opinions of the time, which differ from the opinions of our own.

Along with the shorter writings, Winans wrote an extensive history of Stevens County. He eventually wrote a book, Stevens County, Washington, its creation, addition, subtraction and division, which gives the entire history of Stevens County as Winans could find it. He cites many resources for his book, including his personal diary. In a note he wrote to the Chairman of the Historical Society of the Women's Reading Club in Walla Walla, Winans emphasizes the usefulness of his journal in writing the history of Stevens County. He says, "In [the preparation of historical notes,] I am indebted to Thomas W. Prosch... and lastly to my journal, which I kept during my thirteen years residence in Colville Valley. " He used his journals as a resource in writing his histories, because he was alive during many of the big, important changes that occurred in the region. As The Old Walla Walla, Washington put it,"he lived to witness the remarkable transformation of the county as it emerged from pioneer conditions." Winans was able to document much of the rapid changes in the Pacific Northwest during his lifetime, which is so useful for people following him. Indian Affairs

Some of Winans most significant official work was as Sub-Indian Agent for the six non-treaty tribes in the Fort Colville region. In a letter to the secretary of the Interior entitled "Proposed Indian Reservations in Idaho and Washington Territories," Winans successfully argued against a directive to make lands that whites had already settled into Indian Reservations. Instead of regaining their lands, the Indians were paid for the lands that whites had already settled according to a determined "fair cash value." Like many whites at the time, Winans believed that Native Americans should be assimilated into western culture whenever possible, in order to "civilize" them. He advocated education for Native Americans along with helping them develop farming techniques and abandonment of their hunter-gatherer ways. One Indian with whom Winans was particularly involved was Edward Marsden. Winans travelled to Alaska to meet and speak with Marsden, and wrote several drafts of a biography of Marsden before sending it to the Historical Society. Winans wrote "We came to teach the Indian, but he is now teaching us, by giving us a practical example of 'Leaving all and following Christ.'" Winans initially seemed to share the opinions held by many White people about the barbaric nature of Indians, but he was willing to change that opinion when there was good reason to do so. Because of his high status in society, Winans' positive writings about Marsden would have helped to improve his peers' opinions on Indians. One of his duties as Sub-Indian Agent was to take censuses of the Indians. Winans took censuses of the Okanagans, Calispels, San Poils, Nespelems, Senijexsees, Wenatchees, Isle d'Pierres, Mishouies, Spokanes, and the Swielpees. These censuses were valuable at the time, and also contain much valuable information for modern-day historians. Winans also kept records of transactions with the Indians, including gifts given to chiefs and needy Indians, and several listings of property amounts. He also wrote dozens of vouchers for dozens of different people.

== Death ==
Winans died suddenly on April 22, 1917, after a trip to pick wildflowers. His funeral and memorial services were attended by the Walla Walla community including business members to pay their respects. The funeral was held at Walla Walla Presyterian Church and his was body interred at the Mountain View cemetery. The town's Sunday school children placed wildflowers on his grave in memory of him. He was remembered by community members as a hardworking and upstanding citizen.

== Legacy ==
William Parkhurst Winans was an important figure in Pacific Northwest History. He was responsible for the development of Stevens County, Walla Walla, and Fort Colville. He was devoted to the banking system and created Farmer's Savings Bank for farmers and was president of the bank until his death in 1917. He was responsible of creating other divisions of banking and was a member First National Bank. In addition, he was a clerk for smaller banks and government agencies in the region.

Other than banking, Winans was responsible for the creation and preservation of various records of Native American tribes living in the Pacific Northwest and was in charge of their financial dealings in the late 19th and early 20th centuries. His devotion in the preservation of records for indigenous peoples kept their stories alive for historical and athropoligcal research. However, his work for indigenous peoples did not conclude there. He also created a census for Native Americans and documented their populations and, in 1870, was made superintendent of Indian Affrairs in 1870.

Winans was an amateur historian and authored several history books on various subjects of eastern Washington. His life is documented and preserved as part of the collections at Washington State University and Harvard University.
