= Siege of Puebla (1847) =

Battle in the Mexican-American War

Coordinates: 19°02′N 98°11′W

- Part of the Mexican–American War
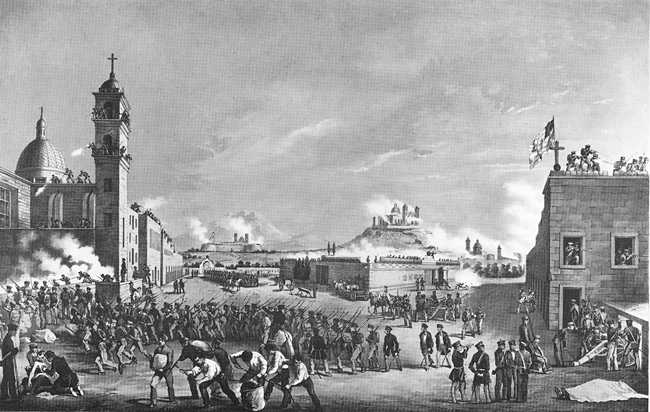
Date	13–14 September until 12 October 1847
Location	Puebla, Puebla
Result	United States victory

Belligerents
United States	Mexico

Commanders and leaders
Thomas Childs; Joseph Lane	Joaquín Rea; Antonio López de Santa Anna

Strength
500 (garrison); 3,000 (relief force)	4,000

Casualties and losses
78	

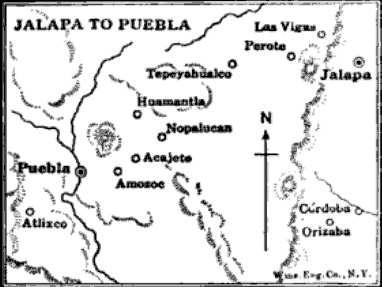
Justin H. Smith's The War with Mexico

Following the Battle of Chapultepec, Santa Anna withdrew his forces from Mexico City, leading a portion in an attempt to take Puebla and cut off Winfield Scott's supply route from Veracruz. The siege of Puebla began the same day Mexico City fell to Scott and lasted for 28 days before a relief force fought its way into the city.

== Background ==
General Winfield Scott had a series of garrisons posted along the route from Veracruz to Mexico City to protect his supply lines. One of these garrisons was posted at the city of Puebla, roughly two-thirds of the way to Mexico City from the coast. The garrison was commanded by Major Thomas Childs, serving as a brevet colonel. Childs had 500 soldiers to guard the city. After the fall of Mexico City, General Antonio López de Santa Anna renounced his presidency and split his forces, taking half of them to try to retake Puebla. General Joaquín Rea commanded the Mexican guerrilla forces in the area around Puebla.

== Siege ==
=== Investment ===
On the night of 13–14 September 1847, Rea's forces entered the city with 4,000 men. The U.S. forces held the convent, Fort Loretto, and the citadel of San José. Lieutenant-Colonel Samuel W. Black, commander of the First Pennsylvania, was put in command of the citadel, which also served as a hospital for 1,800 sick and wounded soldiers. The Mexicans drove off most of the city's cattle, but Childs was able to save enough to keep from starvation. Rea demanded the garrison's surrender on 16 September, but Childs refused, leading Rea to attack San José, unsuccessfully. Childs repulsed a second attack on 18 Sept.

=== Santa Anna ===
Santa Anna resigned as President of Mexico on September 15 and marched the remainder of his army east seeking retribution against the Americans. Santa Anna arrived on 22 September, and launched a 500-man attack on the convent, once again unsuccessfully, yet called for Childs to surrender, which he refused. The attacks continued from 27 Sept. until 1 Oct. During this time Mexican forces constructed breastworks closer and closer to the American garrison.

=== Relief ===
At the end of September, Santa Anna departed with most of the Mexican forces to confront General Joseph Lane's relief column. Santa Anna was defeated at the Battle of Huamantla on 9 Oct and retreated to Querétaro.

As General Lane's relief force neared Puebla, firing was distinctly heard signalling Childs' garrison was not lost.

As Lane's forces began entering the outskirts, Mexican lancers charged into the city's main plaza. Colonel Childs ordered a company from the 1st Pennsylvania Infantry to take up position near the plaza. The Pennsylvanians charged and chased the Mexicans several blocks before being turned back by a counterattack.

At this time, Lane's vanguard entered the city along the National Road. They were fired on from Mexican muskets within a brick building on the street's south side. Lane formed Colonel Charles Brough's 4th Ohio Infantry into battle line supported by Colonel Francis Wynkoop's detachment of the 1st Pennsylvania Infantry destined to soon be reunited with their brethren inside the garrison. A quick charged secured this building bringing Lane's forces within a block of the American defenses. Street fighting continued as the Mexicans made a confused retreat. Colonel Willis A. Gorman's 4th Indiana Infantry and Captain Samuel P. Heintzelman's 2nd U.S. Infantry battalion joined Colonel Brough's Ohio infantry as they converged on the main plaza. General Rea retreated and rejoined the forces of Santa Anna. The 28-day siege ended.
