= Apserkahar =

Native American chief of the Rogue Valley peoples

Apserkahar, (c. N/A-1854) (also known as Tyee Jo, Joapserkahar, Chief Jo, and Horse Rider), was a chief of the Rogue Valley peoples (Takelma). He is best known for his relationship and peace-making efforts with Joseph Lane and Joel Palmer including his involvement in the Rogue River Wars and associated treaties.

== Early life ==
La Fayette Grover served as a commissioner during the Rogue River conflict and recounted details pertaining to the Rogue River conflict and Apserkahar in a statement stored at UC Berkeley's Bancroft Library which was recorded in 1878. This manuscript has since been digitized. The recounted insight Apserkahar's daughter gave about Apserkahar's origins suggest that he married into the Rogue River tribe and was an Umpqua at birth. All of Grover's details about this can be interpreted by his quote below:

After a while there was a daughter of the old chief called Mary, Queen Mary. She was the wife of an Umpqua chief called Joe [Jim]. She spoke to our interpreter, and after she had talked to the father some time she told the interpreter that the council could go on, that there was a difficulty, but it was not mainly on account of objecting to peace. But her father Joseph had intermarried into the tribe of the Rogue Rivers; he was an Umpqua, and that his ancestors were the original occupants of all the country north of the Siskiyou Mountains up to the Umpqua Mountains, and they were all called Umpquas, and that Jim, her husband, was the only surviving hereditary chief of the great chief of the Umpquas, who owned all that land, that the Rogue Rivers were interlopers, that her father originated from a northern California chief of Pit River Indians, who were more warlike, and Jim's people having already had a good deal they came in on to this part of the old original Umpqua domain and held it, that that feud had been settled by their marriage.

== Descriptions of appearance ==
There are no known or accessible photographic or artistic images of Apserkahar. The most detailed and possibly only description of Apserkahar's appearance available comes from Judge Matthew Deady. He provides this tidbit of information about Apserkahar in his reminiscence:

Indian Joseph, tall, grave and self-possessed, wore a long black robe over his ordinary dress.

== Relationship with Joseph Lane ==
Recently resigned Oregon Governor and Superintendent of Indian Affairs Joseph Lane's presence in Rogue River country began in 1850 after gold miners had been attacked on their way back to the Willamette Valley from California were robbed sought Lane's help. The attack happened at Rock Point, west of Gold Hill and on the Rogue River. It was Lane's objective to recover the stolen gold dust and other stolen materials from the Natives responsible.

Once Joseph Lane reached Rogue River he told the first Natives he met that he wanted to speak with their chief. Two days later the Takelma Chief Apserkahar and approximately one-hundred of his people came to the meeting place that Joseph Lane had requested. In Lane's account of events, this is when "a party of about seventy five warriors came marching down on our side of the River all armed with bows and arrows except some twenty who carried guns in their hands.". Again, by Lane's account he convinced the incoming Natives to put down their weapons and join the other Natives in the ongoing meeting. Lane made a promise to the people present that their rights would be protected as long as the white immigrants could repeatedly pass through their country safely. By General Lane's account of events, there was a speech made by Apserkahar during these negotiations and he asserts that after his speech was begun to act in a manner that made Lane believe his group was going to be attacked. This prompted Lane to signal one of the Klikitat mercenaries he brought, Chief Quatley to quickly subdue Apserkahar and hold him hostage. As later recounted by Lane, Joseph Lane then ordered everyone else to leave immediately and return in two days, promising that their captive Chief (Apserkahar) would be held as a guest until then.

In Joseph Lane's autobiography he states that Apserkahar confessed to his involvements in the attacks done on white miners and claims that Apserkahar admitted to scalping them. In captivity Apserkahar grew a level of respect and admiration for General Lane. Apserkahar requested to have Joseph Lane's name which is believed to be a sign of significant importance and respect. Lane agreed to give Apserkahar half of his name and from that moment forward until he died he was known as Jo. Because Joseph Lane was known to most people as "Jo", it is likely that when he gave Apserkahar half of his name it is meant to that he was not given Joseph Lane's last name. Lane also gave the name Sally to Apserkahar's wife, Mary to his daughter and Ben to his son. In return, Apserkahar gave Lane (a pro-slavery Democrat) a young boy who was a Modoc slave whom by Lane's account later saved his life. Apserkahar's interactions and personal relationship with Lane likely shaped his persistent pro-peace sentiment that became a staple of Apserkahar's legacy. Apserkahar went on to sign several peace treaties with his brother Toquahear (Chief Sam), on representing the Rogue River valley peoples. These treaties were tested repeatedly by Natives and white Immigrants in the region alike, arising in varying and renewed conflict.
