= 59th Indiana Infantry Regiment =

59th Regiment, Indiana Volunteer Infantry
- Flag of the United States, 1865-1867
- Active: February 1862 - July 1865
- Country: United States of America
- Allegiance: Union Army
- Branch: Army
- Type: Infantry
- Engagements: Siege of Island No. 10; Siege of Corinth; Second Battle of Corinth; Battle of Raymond; Battle of Jackson; Battle of Champion Hill; Battle of Vicksburg; March to the Sea; Bentonville; Battle of Bentonville

Commanders
- Notable commanders: Col. Jesse Ianthus Alexander; Col. Thomas A. McNaught

The 59th Regiment, Indiana Volunteer Infantry, was organized at Gosport and Indianapolis, Indiana on February 11, 1862. It was moved to Commerce, Missouri on February 18–22, the first Regiment to report to General Pope for duty with the Army of Mississippi during the American Civil War.

== History ==
The 59th Regiment, Indiana Infantry was attached to

- The 1st Brigade, 2nd Division, Army of Mississippi, to April, 1862.
- The 2nd Brigade, 3rd Division, Army of Mississippi, to April, 1862.
- The 1st Brigade, 3rd Division, Army of Mississippi, to November, 1862.
- The 1st Brigade, 7th Division, Left Wing 13th Army Corps, Dept. of the Tennessee, to December, 1862.
- The 1st Brigade, 7th Division, 16th Army Corps, to January, 1863.
- The 1st Brigade, 7th Division, 17th Army Corps, to September, 1863.
- The 1st Brigade, 2nd Division, 17th Army Corps, to December, 1863.
- The 1st Brigade, 3rd Division, 15th Army Corps, to April, 1865.
- The 2nd Brigade, 4th Division, 15th Army Corps, to July, 1865.

== Service ==
=== 1862 ===
- Siege operations against New Madrid, Missouri, March 3–14, 1862.
- Siege and capture in the Battle of Island Number Ten, on the Mississippi River, March 15-April 8, 1862.
- Expedition to Fort Pillow, Tennessee, April 13–17, 1862.
- Moved to Hazaburg Landing, Tennessee, April 18–22, 1862.
- Advance on and Siege of Corinth at Corinth, Mississippi, April 29-May 30, 1862.
- Pursuit to Booneville May 30-June 12, 1862.
- Duty at Clear Creek till August 6, and at Jacinto till September 18, 1862.
- March to Iuka, Mississippi, September 18–20, 1862.
- Battle of Corinth October 3–4, 1862.
- Pursuit to Ripley October 5–12, 1862.
- Grant's Central Mississippi Campaign.
- Operations on Mississippi Central Railroad November 2, 1862, to January 10, 1863.
- Reconnaissance from LaGrange November 8–9, 1862.

=== 1863 ===
- Duty at Memphis, Tennessee, January 12 to February 24, 1863.
- Yazoo Pass Expedition by Moon Lake, Yazoo Pass and Coldwater and Tallahatchie Rivers February 24-April 8, 1863.
- Operations against Fort Pemberton and Greenwood March 13-April 5, 1863.
- Moved to Milliken's Bend, Louisiana, April 13, 1863.
- Movement on Bruinsburg and turning Grand Gulf April 25-April 30, 1863.
- Battle of Port Gibson, May 1, 1863 (Reserve).
- Jones' Cross Roads and Willow Springs May 3, 1863.
- Battle of Raymond on May 12, 1863.
- Battle of Jackson on May 14, 1863.
- Battle of Champion Hill on May 16, 1863.
- Battle of Vicksburg May 18-July 4. Assaults on Vicksburg May 19 and 22, 1863. Surrender of Vicksburg July 4. Duty there till September 13, 1863.
- Movement to Memphis, Tennessee, thence march to Chattanooga, Tennessee, September 13-November 20, 1863.
- Operations on Memphis and Charleston Railroad in Alabama October 20–29, 1863.
- Chattanooga-Ringgold Campaign November 23–27, 1863.
- Tunnel Hill November 23–25, 1863.
- Mission Ridge November 25, 1863.
- Pursuit to Graysville November 26-November 27, 1863.
- Duty at Bridgeport and Huntsville, Alabama, December 18, 1863, to June 22, 1864.

=== 1864 ===
- Re-enlisted January 1, 1864.
- Guard Bridge at Etowah River July 13-August 26, 1864.
- Ordered to Chattanooga, Tennessee, August 26, 1864.
- Pursuit of Wheeler August 27–31, 1864.
- Duty at Chattanooga till September 21, and at Etowah River till November 12, 1864.
- March to the sea November 15-December 10, 1864.
- Siege of Savannah on December 10–21, 1864.

=== 1865 ===
- Campaign of the Carolinas January to April, 1865.
- Salkehatchie Swamp, South Carolina., February 2-February 5, 1865.
- South Edisto River February 9, 1865.
- North Edisto River February 12–13, 1865.
- Columbia, South Carolina on February 16–17, 1865.
- Battle of Bentonville, Bentonville, North Carolina, March 19–21, 1865.
- Occupation of Goldsboro, Goldsboro, North Carolina, March 24, 1865.
- Advance on Raleigh, North Carolina from April 10–14, 1865.
- Occupation of Raleigh April 14, 1865.
- Bennett's House on April 26, 1865.
- Surrender of General Johnston and his army.
- March to Washington, D. C., via Richmond, Virginia, April 29-May 19, 1865.
- Grand Review May 24.
- Moved to Louisville, Kentucky, June, and there mustered out July 17, 1865.

== Casualties ==
During its service the regiment lost 1 Officer and 36 Enlisted men killed and mortally wounded and 229 Enlisted men by disease for a total of 266.

== See also ==
- List of Indiana Civil War regiments
