= Roger Alden =

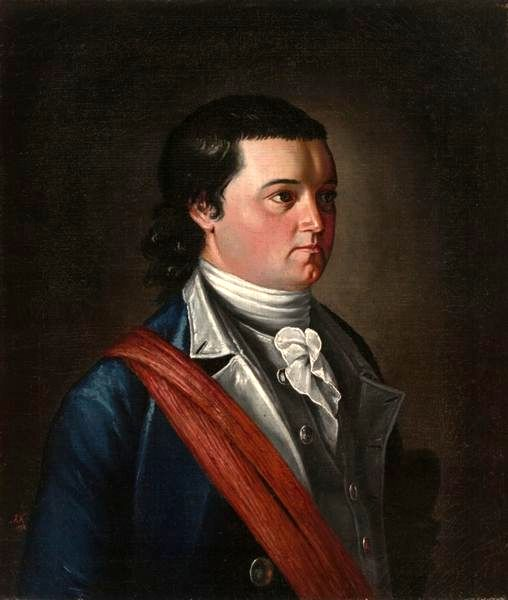
Portrait of Roger Alden

Roger Alden (February 11, 1754 – November 5, 1836) graduated from Yale in 1773, and served in the American Revolutionary War as an aide to General Nathanael Greene. He served as a lieutenant in the Connecticut Line, and was promoted to captain of the Second Connecticut Regiment on September 1, 1779. He continued to serve in the army until February 10, 1781. Alden studied law in the office of William Samuel Johnson (1727-1819) and served as deputy secretary to the Continental Congress from 1785 until 1789, when he joined the State Department as chief clerk to the domestic department. He was the resident agent of the Holland Land Company in Meadville, Pennsylvania from 1795 to 1803 and as ordnance storekeeper at West Point from 1825 until his death.
