= Edward Deering Mansfield =

American author (1801–1880)

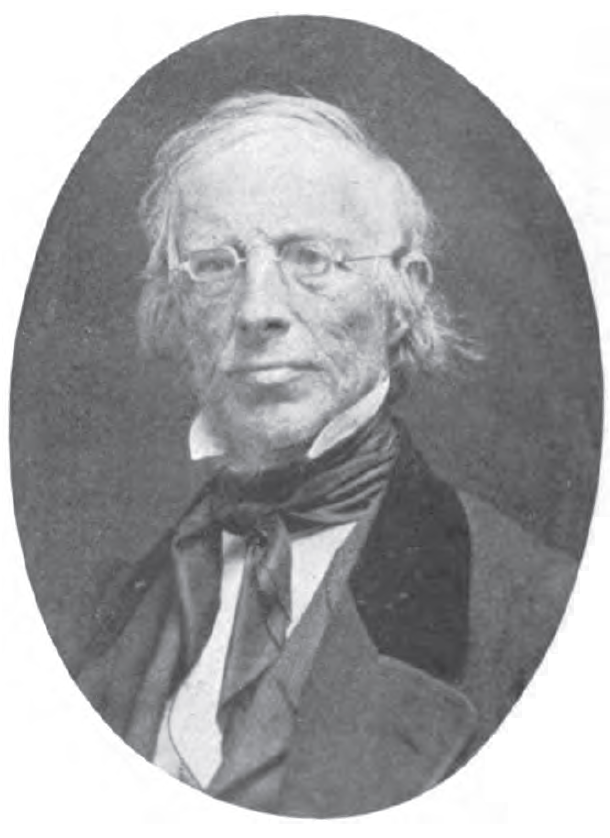
- Born: August 17, 1801; New Haven, Connecticut, U.S.
- Died: October 27, 1880 (aged 79); Morrow, Ohio, U.S.
- Education: United States Military Academy; Princeton University

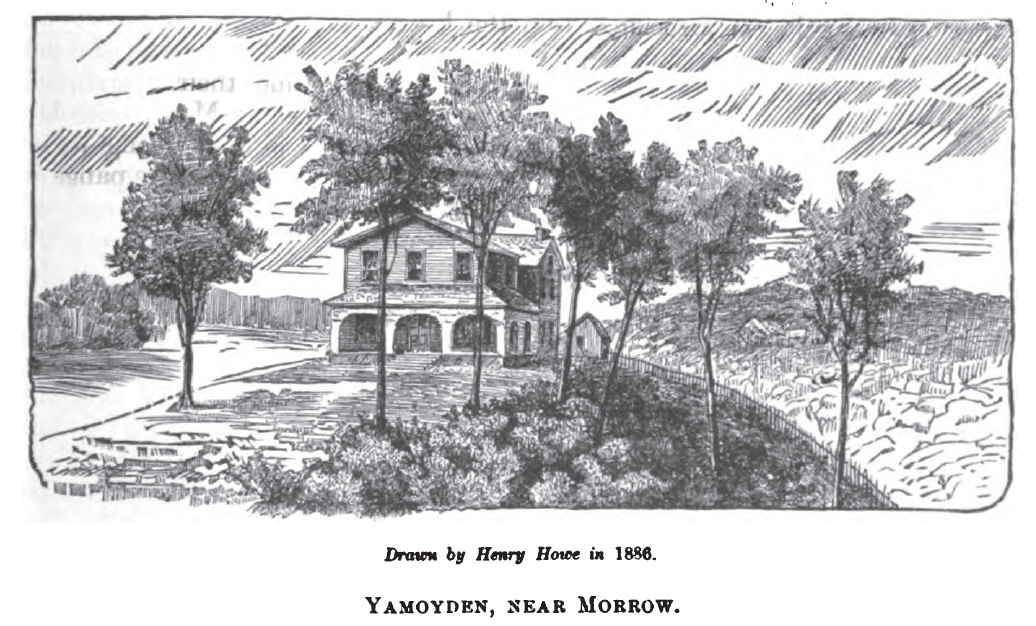
Yamoyden drawn by Henry Howe

Edward Deering Mansfield (August 17, 1801 —October 27, 1880), was an American lawyer, journalist and writer.

== Biography ==
Mansfield was born in New Haven, Connecticut, son of Jared Mansfield. He graduated from West Point in 1818, but declined to enter the army and studied at Princeton, from which he graduated in 1822. In 1825 he was admitted to the Connecticut bar. He afterward removed to Cincinnati, and in 1836 became professor of constitutional law at Cincinnati College. Shortly afterward, however, he abandoned the legal profession to engage in journalism, and edited successively the Cincinnati Chronicle (1836–49), Atlas (1849–52), and Railroad Record (1854–72). While editing the Chronicle and Atlas he introduced many young writers to the public, among whom was Harriet Beecher Stowe. He was Commissioner of Statistics for the State of Ohio from 1859 to 1868 and was a member of the Société française de statistique universelle. He published:

- Political Grammar of the United States (1835)
- Legal Rights, Liabilities and Duties of Women (1845)
- Life of Gen. Winfield Scott (1848)
- History of the Mexican War (1849)
- American Education (1851)
- Memoirs of Daniel Drake (1855)
- A Popular Life of Ulysses S. Grant (1868)
- Personal Memories (1870), an interesting social and political chronicle reaching to the year 1841

Mansfield died at his country home called Yamoyden near Morrow, Ohio.
