= Battle of Huamantla =

Mexican-American War battle

Coordinates: 19.31269°N 97.923862°W

- Part of the Mexican–American War
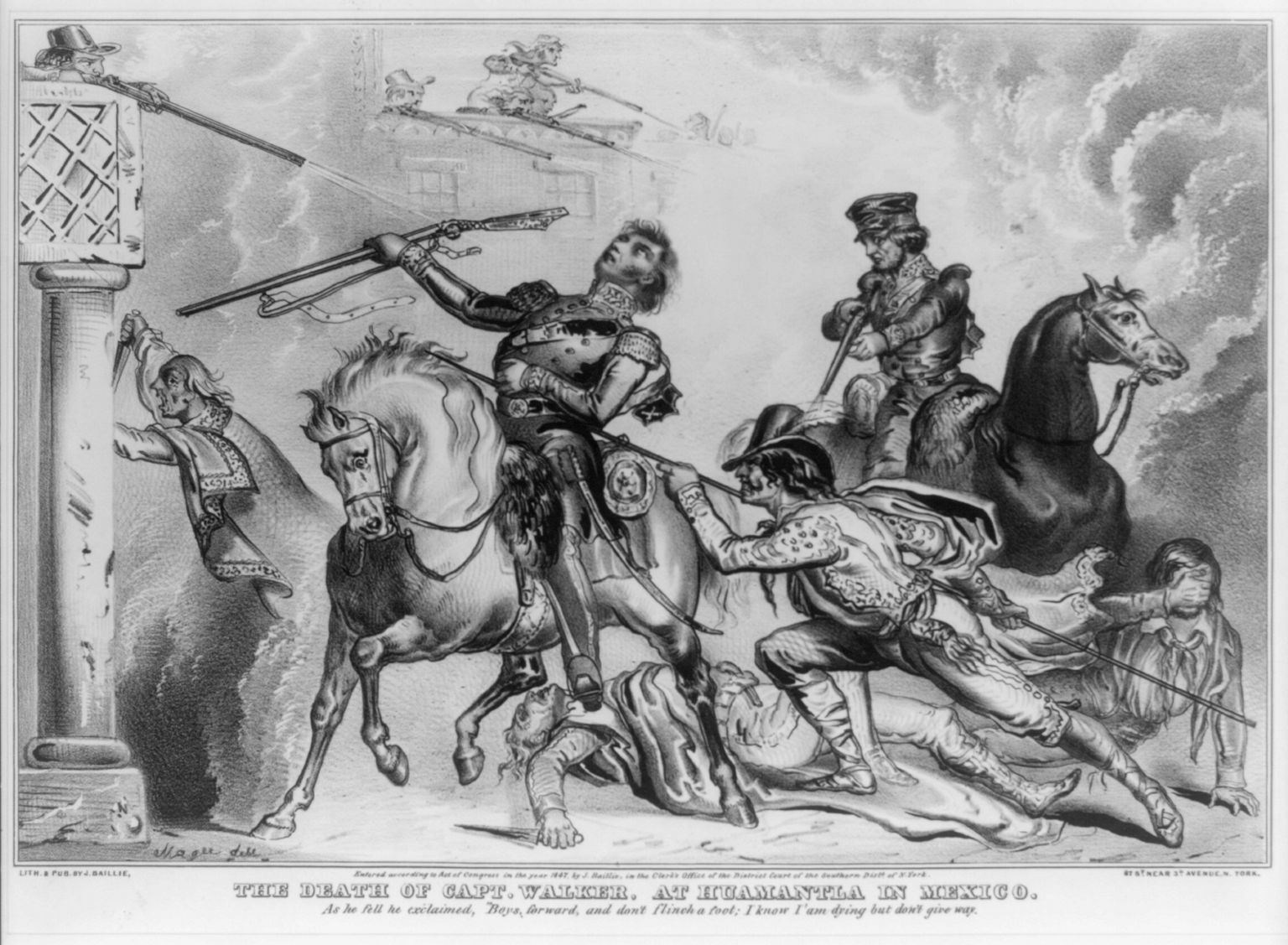
- The death of Capt. Walker
Date	October 9, 1847
Location	Huamantla, Tlaxcala
Result	American victory

Belligerents
United States	Mexico

Commanders and leaders
(United States) Joseph Lane	(Mexico) Antonio López de Santa Anna

Strength
2,700	2,000

Casualties and losses
13 killed 22 wounded 10 missing.	unknown

The Battle of Huamantla was a U.S. victory in the late stages of the Mexican–American War, which forced the Mexican Army to lift the siege of Puebla.

== Background ==
Santa Anna left Puebla at the end of September to intercept Joseph Lane's relief column, planning an ambush at Paso del Pintal. Upon learning of Santa Anna's at Huamantla, Lane left his supply train under guard and marched toward that city, with Captain Samuel H. Walker's four cavalry companies leading the advance.

== Battle ==
Walker charged, upon seeing Santa Anna's lancers, driving the Mexicans from the town. Santa Anna led a counterattack, Walker was shot by a civilian in a nearby house, and his men retreated into a church. The Mexicans then retreated to Querétaro. Among those taken prisoner was Major Iturbide, son of the former Emperor of Mexico.

Lane allowed his troops to engage in a drunken sack of the town. They reached Puebla on 12 October, lifting the siege.

== Order of battle ==
=== United States ===
Brigade	Regiments and Other
Lane's Brigade BG Joseph Lane	4th Indiana Volunteer Infantry: Colonel Willis A. Gorman; 1st Pennsylvania Volunteer Infantry battalion: Colonel Francis Murray Wynkoop; 9th U.S. Infantry, four companies: Major Folliot T. Lally; 2nd U.S. Infantry, detachment of six companies: Captain Samuel P. Heintzelman; Mounted detachment: Captain Samuel H. Walker; Texas Mounted Infantry: Captain Samuel H. Walker; Louisiana Cavalry: Captain Besacon; Louisiana Cavalry: Captain Lewis; Georgia Cavalry: Captain Loyal; 3rd Artillery Battalion: Captain George Taylor; Field's Battery: Lt Field
Guarding Supply Train	4th Ohio Volunteer Infantry: Colonel Charles H. Brough; 7th U.S. Infantry, detachment: Captain Simmons; Pratt's Battery, 2nd U.S. Artillery: Lt Pratt

=== Mexico ===
Mexican Army: General Antonio López de Santa Anna

== See also ==
- Battles of the Mexican–American War
