= Joseph Lane =

American politician and soldier (1801–1881)

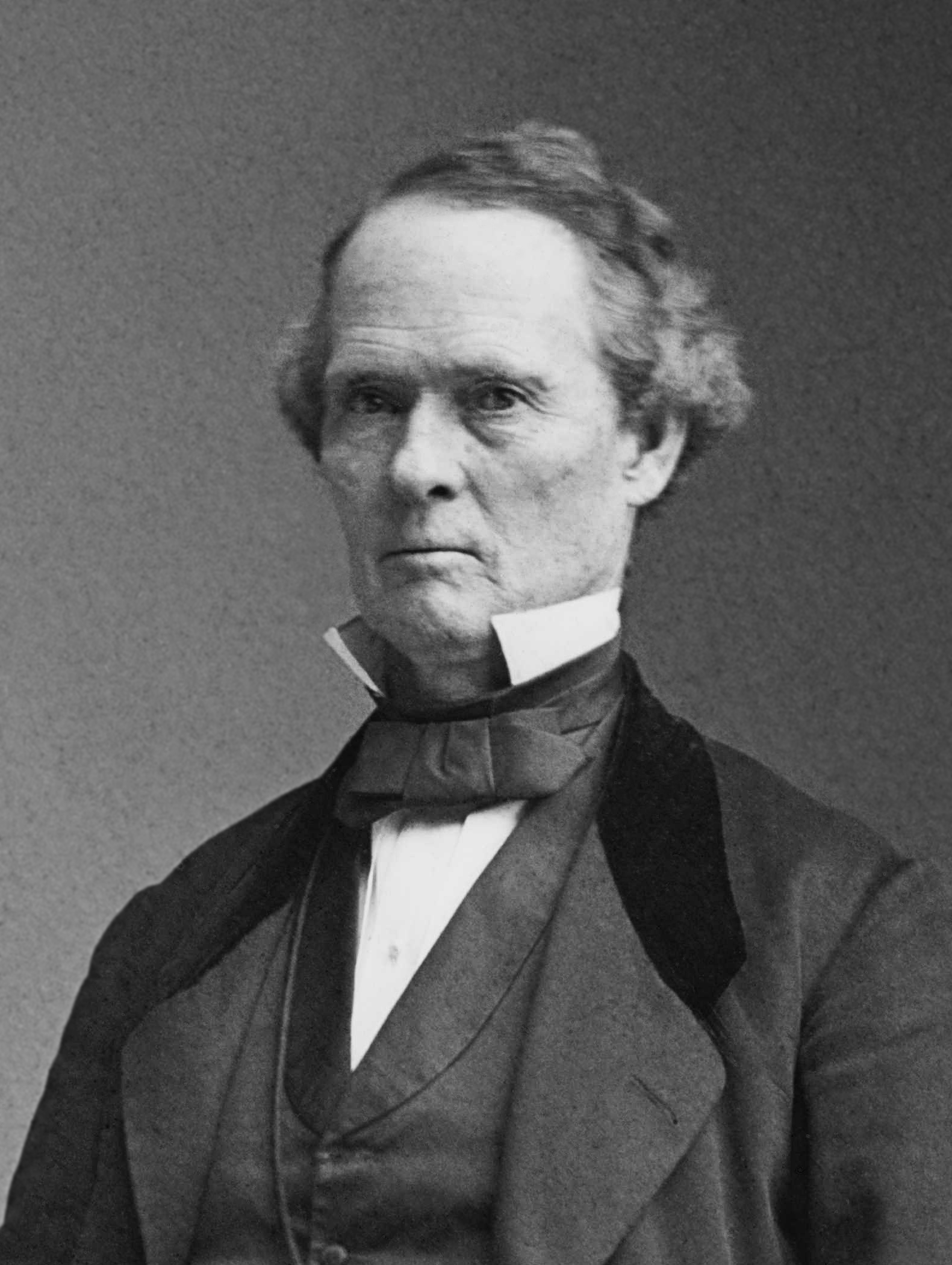
- Lane, 1855–1865

United States Senator from Oregon
- In office February 14, 1859 – March 3, 1861
- Preceded by: Himself (Shadow Senator)
- Succeeded by: James Nesmith

United States Shadow Senator from the Oregon Territory
- In office July 5, 1858 – February 14, 1859
- Preceded by: Seat established
- Succeeded by: Himself (U.S. Senator)

Governor of the Oregon Territory
- In office May 16, 1853 – May 19, 1853; Acting
- Preceded by: John P. Gaines
- Succeeded by: George Curry (Acting)
- In office March 3, 1849 – June 18, 1850
- Appointed by: James K. Polk
- Preceded by: George Abernethy
- Succeeded by: Kintzing Prichette

Delegate to the U.S. House of Representatives from the Oregon Territory's at-large district
- In office March 4, 1851 – February 14, 1859
- Preceded by: Samuel Thurston
- Succeeded by: La Fayette Grover (Representative)

Personal details
- Born: December 14, 1801 Buncombe County, North Carolina, U.S.
- Died: April 19, 1881 (aged 79) Roseburg, Oregon, U.S.
- Party: Democratic
- Spouse: Polly Hart
- Children: 10, including Lafayette
- Relatives: Harry Lane (grandson)
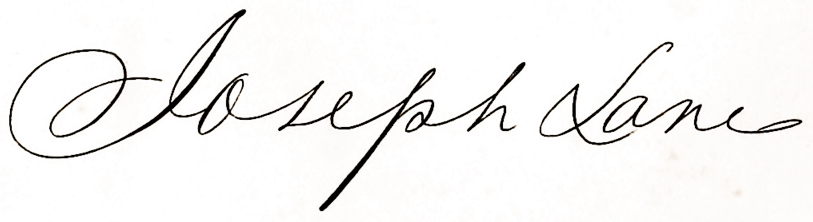
- Signature

Military service
- Allegiance: United States
- Branch/service: United States Volunteers
- Years of service: 1846–1848, 1853-1856
- Rank: Brigadier general Brevet major general
- Battles/wars: Mexican–American War; Battle of Buena Vista; Siege of Puebla; Battle of Huamantla; Rogue River Wars; Battle of Evans Creek

Joseph Lane (December 14, 1801 – April 19, 1881) was an American politician and soldier. He was a state legislator representing Evansville, Indiana, and then served in the Mexican–American War, becoming a general and commanding the 2nd Indiana Volunteers. President James K. Polk appointed Lane as the first governor of Oregon Territory. When Oregon was admitted as a state in 1859, Lane was elected one of Oregon's first two U.S. senators.

In the 1860 United States presidential election, Lane was nominated for vice president of the Southern wing of the Democratic Party, as John C. Breckinridge's running mate.

One of his sons was later elected U.S. Representative, and a grandson U.S. Senator, making Lane the patriarch of one of the state's most prominent political families.

== Early life ==
Joseph Lane was born in Buncombe County, North Carolina, on December 14, 1801, to a family of English extraction with roots in colonial Virginia. His father, John Lane, was a veteran of the American Revolutionary War. The Lane family moved to Kentucky from North Carolina when Joseph was a young child.

Lane left home at the age of 15 and was married four years later. He moved to Evansville, Indiana, in 1820. Lane and his wife, Polly Hart Lane, had 10 children.

Lane was largely self-educated, learning about the world from books he read at night. During the daytime, he worked and saved his money, investing it shortly in the purchase of a flatboat, with which he transported freight up and down the Ohio River. Financial success followed.

Lane was an eloquent public speaker, a talent that helped him to win election to the Indiana House of Representatives in 1822 at the age of just 21. He served in that body from 1822 to 1823, from 1830 to 1833, and from 1838 to 1839. He then moved to the Indiana State Senate, where he served from 1839 to 1840, and from 1844 to 1846. Widely esteemed by his peers, Lane was likewise elected as a captain of his local militia while still a young man.

== Mexican-American War ==
The Mexican–American War broke out in 1846. Lane resigned his State Senate seat and enlisted in a company of Indiana volunteers. His company was assigned to the 2nd Indiana Volunteer Regiment, and Lane was elected colonel in June 1846. He was appointed a brigadier general of volunteers less than a week later.

Lane and the Indiana troops were then deployed to Mexico where he fought with distinction, suffering two minor gunshot wounds and was brevetted to major general in 1847. He commanded the Indiana Brigade at the Battle of Buena Vista, where he served under General and future President Zachary Taylor.

Lane led the relief force which lifted the Siege of Puebla, defeating Antonio López de Santa Anna at the Battle of Huamantla.The same month, on October 19, 1847, Lane again won another military victory against Mexican forces at what became known as the Action of Atlixco.

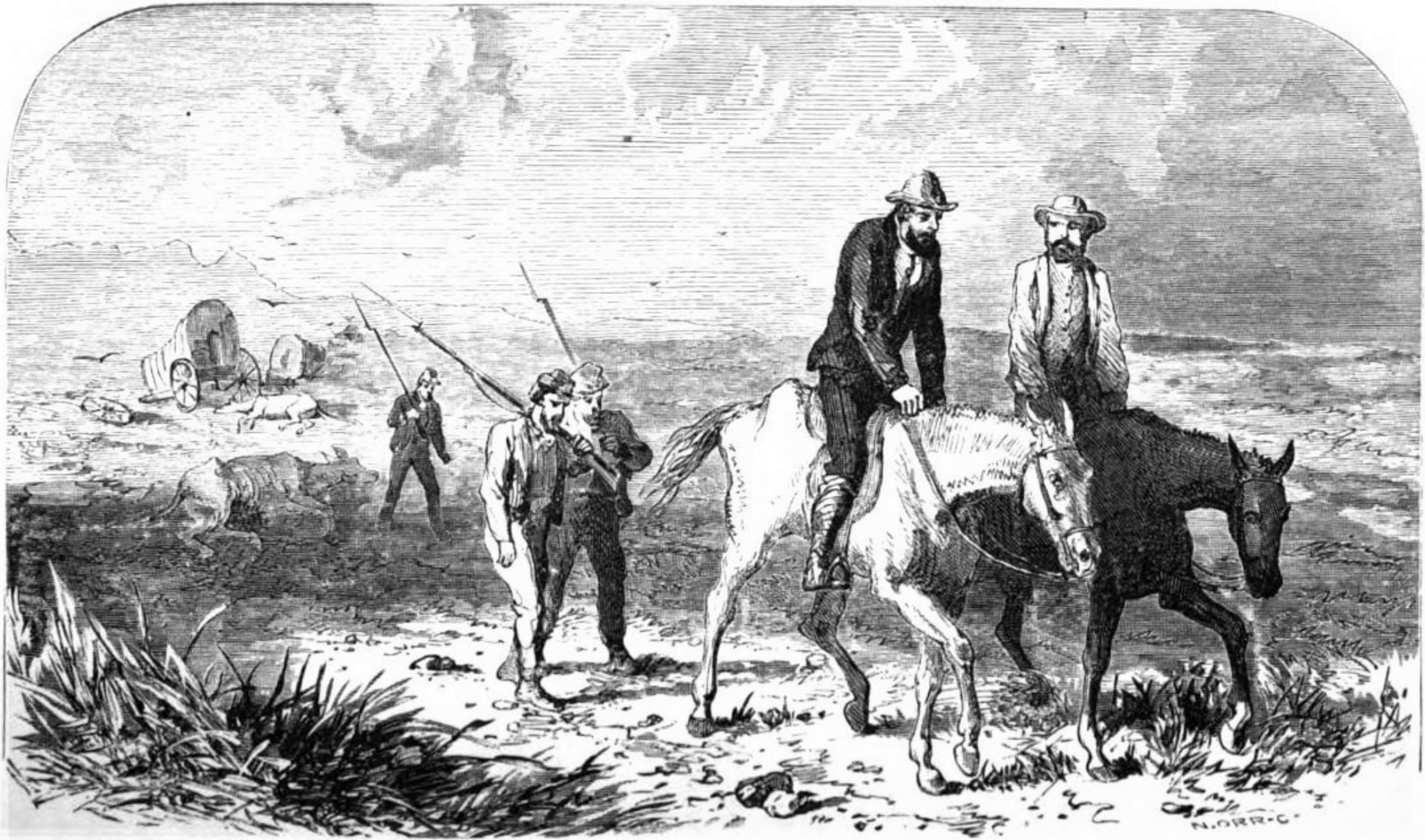
En route to Oregon with Joseph Meek, as depicted in Frances Fuller Victor's 1877 book Eleven years in the Rocky Mountains and a life on the frontier.

== Oregon territory and statehood ==
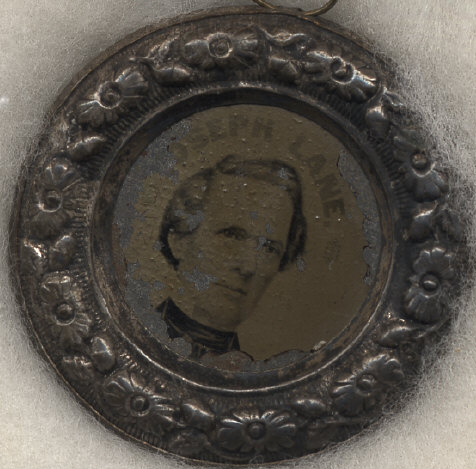
Joseph Lane campaign button from 1860

As soon as Lane returned from Mexico, President Polk appointed him governor of Oregon Territory. Lane received his commission on August 18, 1848. Lane arrived in Oregon on March 3, 1849, following a hazardous winter trip on the Oregon Trail. Upon reaching Oregon City, Lane's first official act was to initiate the first census of the territory's residents, which showed a total of 8,785 American citizens and 298 citizens of other countries.

While Governor, Lane also served as the first Oregon Superintendent of Indian Affairs.

Also among Lane's early duties was the apprehension of five Cayuse Indians accused in the Whitman Massacre. The accused were brought back to Oregon City for trial, where they were convicted and hanged. Lane resigned as territorial governor on June 18, 1850, in favor of a new appointee. On June 2, 1851, Lane was elected Oregon Territory's Delegate in Congress as a Democrat. In May 1853, he was acting Territorial Governor for three days to assist in the removal of the unpopular John P. Gaines from office. Lane then ran for re-election as Delegate, winning election on June 6, 1853. Lane won two more terms of office as Delegate in the June elections of 1855 and 1857. He was subsequently elected as one of Oregon's first two United States Senators when Oregon became a state in 1859.

== Military operations against Native Americans ==
In 1853, after he was re-elected as Delegate, but before he left for Washington, D.C., Lane was appointed as brigadier general commanding a force of volunteers raised to suppress recent Native American violence. Lane led the force to southern Oregon to stop Native American attacks against settlers and miners there. Lane was again wounded in a skirmish at Table Rock, in Sams Valley, not far from today's cities of Medford and Central Point.

Lane was also an active participant in the so-called Rogue River Wars of 1855–1856, being wounded in the shoulder at the Battle of Evans Creek.

Lane approved of the killing of Native Americans; according to historian Marc Carpenter, "he was very appreciative of the killing of Native people en masse...He wrote about how fortunate it is when they have a woman and children with them [when traveling] because then they’re slower and, to quote, ‘None would make it across the river.’”

According to Carpenter, Lane also sexually assaulted Native American women.

== Vice-presidential nomination and political decline ==
In 1860, the Democratic Party split on the issue of slavery. Pro-slavery Democrats left the national convention nominated their own candidates: John C. Breckinridge for president, and Lane for vice president.

This "Southern Democrat" ticket was defeated. With his defeat for vice president and the beginning of the Civil War, Lane's political career ended. Lane became notorious for an exchange with Andrew Johnson of Tennessee on his last day in the Senate. Johnson had spoken in favor of the Union and denounced secession. The first referendum out of two on secession in Tennessee failed shortly thereafter, generally credited to Johnson's speech. On March 2, Lane accused Johnson of having "sold his birthright" as a Southerner. Johnson responded by suggesting that Lane was a hypocrite for so accusing Johnson when Lane so staunchly supported a movement of active treason against the United States.

== Later years ==
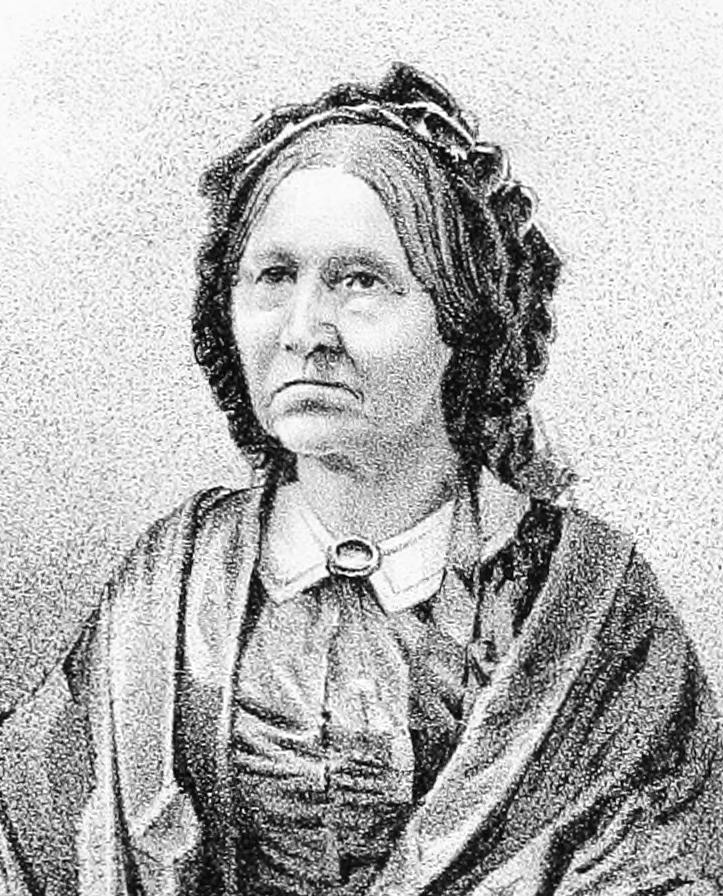
Portrait of Polly Hart Lane, Joseph Lane's wife

Lane had taken a land claim of 1 square mile (2.6 km^{2}) located just north of Roseburg, Oregon, in 1851. He later purchased a 2,000-acre (810 ha) ranch located about 11 miles (18 km) east of that town, which he owned for a number of years before selling to a son. Lane also constructed a home overlooking the South Umpqua River; after his Senate term, he retired there in 1861. Although openly sympathetic to the Confederate cause, he remained home on his ranch; he did not participate in the war, nor did he make a return to politics after that date. Lane was baptized as a Roman Catholic in 1867, and his family was reared in the same faith, but he renounced that faith shortly before his death.

While slavery was never legal in Oregon, Lane reportedly enslaved two black children in spite of the laws; a boy named John, who was given to him as a gift, and another named Peter Waldo. Lane described them as "apprentices".

== Death and legacy ==
Lane died at his home on April 19, 1881. His body was interred in the Roseburg Memorial Gardens.

General Lane's daughter's home in Roseburg, where he spent much of his time, is now a museum maintained by the Douglas County Historical Society. Known as the Creed Floed House, the Floed–Lane House, or simply the Joseph Lane House, it is on the National Register of Historic Places. The Floed-Lane House was never his dwelling place.

Lane County, Oregon, is named for Lane. Joseph Lane Middle School in Roseburg is named for him, as is Joseph Lane Middle School in Portland.

Lane's son Lafayette Lane served as U.S. Representative from 1875 to 1877; another son, John Lane, fought in the Civil War for the Confederacy. Lane's grandson Harry Lane was a mayor of Portland, Oregon, and then U.S. Senator from 1913 until his death in 1917.

== Dates of rank ==
=== United States Volunteers ===
Date	Insignia	Rank	Brevet Promotions
June 25, 1846		Colonel	
July 1, 1846		Brigadier general	Bvt. Major general (1847) (Note: October 9, 1847, for gallantry and meritorious conduct in the Battle of Huamantla.)
July 20, 1848	Honorably discharged from service.		

== Works cited ==
- Speech of Hon. Joseph Lane, of Oregon, on the Suppression of Indian Hostilities in Oregon: Delivered in the House of Representatives, April 2, 1856. Washington, DC: Congressional Globe Office, 1856.

Political offices
Preceded by George Abernethy	Governor of Oregon; 1848–1850	Succeeded by Kintzing Prichette
Preceded by John P. Gaines	Governor of Oregon; Acting; 1853	Succeeded by George Curry; Acting
U.S. House of Representatives
Preceded by Samuel Thurston	Delegate to the U.S. House of Representatives from the Oregon Territory's at-large congressional district 1851–1859	Succeeded by La Fayette Grover as U.S. Representative
U.S. Senate
New seat	U.S. Shadow Senator (Class 3) from the Oregon Territory; 1858–1859; Served alongside: Delazon Smith	Succeeded by Himself as U.S. Senator
Preceded by Himself as Shadow Senator	U.S. Senator (Class 3) from Oregon; 1859–1861; Served alongside: Delazon Smith, Edward Baker	Succeeded by James Nesmith
Party political offices
Preceded by John C. Breckinridge	Democratic nominee for Vice President of the United States^{(2)} 1860	Succeeded by George H. Pendleton
Notes and references
1. The Democratic Party split in 1860, producing two vice presidential candidates. Lane was nominated by Southern Democrats; Herschel Vespasian Johnson was nominated by Northern Democrats.
