= 1855 New Hampshire gubernatorial election =

- March 13, 1855
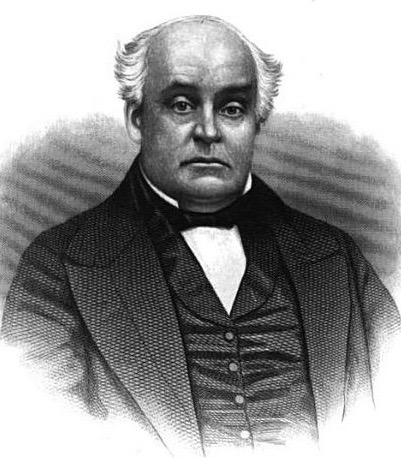

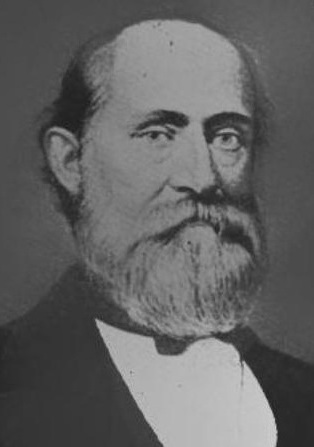

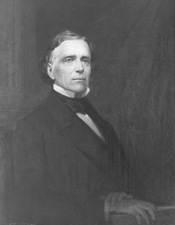
Nominee	Ralph Metcalf	Nathaniel B. Baker	James Bell
Party	Know Nothing	Democratic	Whig
Popular vote	32,779	27,050	3,436
Percentage	50.71%	41.84%	5.32%
- County results Metcalf: 40–50% 50–60% 60–70% Baker: 40–50% 50–60%
Governor before election
Nathaniel B. Baker
Democratic
Elected Governor
Ralph Metcalf
Know Nothing

The 1855 New Hampshire gubernatorial election was held on March 13, 1855, in order to elect the governor of New Hampshire. Know Nothing nominee and former member of the New Hampshire House of Representatives Ralph Metcalf defeated incumbent Democratic governor Nathaniel B. Baker, Whig nominee and former member of the New Hampshire House of Representatives James Bell and Free Soil Party nominee Asa Fowler.

== General election ==
On election day, March 13, Know Nothing candidate Ralph Metcalf won the election by a margin of 5,729 votes against his foremost opponent incumbent governor Nathaniel B. Baker, thereby gaining Know Nothing control over the office of governor. Metcalf was sworn in as the 25th governor of New Hampshire on June 7, 1855.

=== Results ===
New Hampshire gubernatorial election, 1855
Party	Candidate	Votes	%
Know Nothing	Ralph Metcalf	32,779	50.71
Democratic	Nathaniel B. Baker (incumbent)	27,050	41.84
Whig	James Bell	3,436	5.32
Free Soil	Asa Fowler	1,187	1.84
	Scattering	193	0.29
Total votes		64,645	100.00
Know Nothing gain from Democratic			
