= 1854 New Hampshire gubernatorial election =

- March 14, 1854
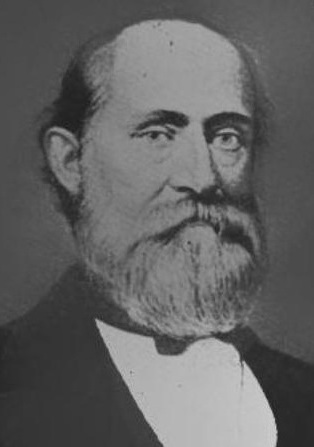

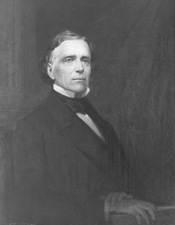

Nominee	Nathaniel B. Baker	James Bell	Jared Perkins
Party	Democratic	Whig	Free Soil
Popular vote	29,788	16,940	11,080
Percentage	51.42%	29.24%	19.13%
- County results Baker: 40–50% 50–60% 60–70%
Governor before election
Noah Martin
Democratic
Elected Governor
Nathaniel B. Baker
Democratic

The 1854 New Hampshire gubernatorial election was held on March 14, 1854, in order to elect the Governor of New Hampshire. Democratic nominee and former member of the New Hampshire House of Representatives Nathaniel B. Baker defeated Whig nominee and former member of the New Hampshire House of Representatives James Bell and Free Soil Party nominee and former member of the U.S. House of Representatives from New Hampshire's 3rd district Jared Perkins.

== General election ==
On election day, March 14, 1854, Democratic nominee Nathaniel B. Baker won the election by a margin of 12,848 votes against his foremost opponent Whig nominee James Bell, thereby retaining Democratic control over the office of Governor. Baker was sworn in as the 24th Governor of New Hampshire on June 8, 1854.

=== Results ===
New Hampshire gubernatorial election, 1854
Party	Candidate	Votes	%
Democratic	Nathaniel B. Baker	29,788	51.42
Whig	James Bell	16,940	29.24
Free Soil	Jared Perkins	11,080	19.13
	Scattering	122	0.21
Total votes		57,930	100.00
Democratic hold			
