= 1860 New Hampshire gubernatorial election =

- March 13, 1860
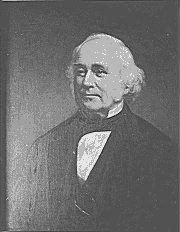

Nominee	Ichabod Goodwin	Asa P. Cate
Party	Republican	Democratic
Popular vote	38,037	33,544
Percentage	53.12%	46.85%
- County results Goodwin: 50–60% 60–70% Cate: 50–60%
Governor before election
Ichabod Goodwin
Republican
Elected Governor
Ichabod Goodwin
Republican

The 1860 New Hampshire gubernatorial election was held on March 13, 1860.

Incumbent Republican Governor Ichabod Goodwin defeated Democratic nominee Asa P. Cate in a re-match of the previous year's election.

== General election ==
=== Candidates ===
- Asa P. Cate, Democratic, attorney, former President of the New Hampshire Senate, Democratic nominee for Governor in 1858 and 1859
- Ichabod Goodwin, Republican, incumbent Governor

=== Results ===
1860 New Hampshire gubernatorial election (Note: Some sources give the result as Goodwin 38,031, Cate 33,543, scattering 22. The result given is taken from the New Hampshire Senate Journal.)
Party	Candidate	Votes	%	±%
Republican	Ichabod Goodwin (incumbent)	38,037	53.12%	
Democratic	Asa P. Cate	33,544	46.85%	
Scattering		22	0.03%	
Majority		4,493	6.27%	
Turnout		71,603		
Republican hold		Swing		
