= List of United States representatives in the 32nd Congress =

This is a complete list of United States representatives during the 32nd United States Congress listed by seniority.

As an historical article, the districts and party affiliations listed reflect those during the 32nd Congress (March 4, 1851 – March 3, 1853). Seats and party affiliations on similar lists for other congresses will be different for certain members.

Seniority depends on the date on which members were sworn into office. Since many members are sworn in on the same day, subsequent ranking is based on previous congressional service of the individual and then by alphabetical order by the last name of the representative.

Committee chairmanship in the House is often associated with seniority. However, party leadership is typically not associated with seniority.

Note: The "*" indicates that the representative/delegate may have served one or more non-consecutive terms while in the House of Representatives of the United States Congress.

== U.S. House seniority list ==
U.S. House seniority
Rank	Representative	Party	District	Seniority date (Previous service, if any)	No.# of term(s)	Notes
1	Linn Boyd	D	KY-01	March 4, 1839; Previous service, 1835–1837.	8th term*	Dean and Speaker of the House
2	John Reeves Jones Daniel	D	NC-06	March 4, 1841	6th term	Left the House in 1853.
3	Joshua R. Giddings	W	OH-20	December 5, 1842; Previous service, 1838–1842.	9th term*	
4	Armistead Burt	D	SC-05	March 4, 1843	5th term	Left the House in 1853.
5	Andrew Johnson	D	TN-01	March 4, 1843	5th term	Left the House in 1853.
6	George W. Jones	D	TN-05	March 4, 1843	5th term	
7	Joseph A. Woodward	D	SC-03	March 4, 1843	5th term	Left the House in 1853.
8	Alexander H. Stephens	W	GA-07	October 2, 1843	5th term	
9	Thomas H. Bayly	D	VA-07	May 6, 1844	5th term	
10	Meredith P. Gentry	W	TN-07	March 4, 1845; Previous service, 1839–1843.	6th term*	Left the House in 1853.
11	John S. Phelps	D	MO-05	March 4, 1845	4th term	
12	Frederick P. Stanton	D	TN-10	March 4, 1845	4th term	
13	Robert Toombs	D	GA-08	March 4, 1845	4th term	Left the House in 1853.
14	Thomas S. Bocock	D	VA-04	March 4, 1847	3rd term	
15	Albert G. Brown	D	MS-04	March 4, 1847; Previous service, 1839–1841.	4th term*	Left the House in 1853.
16	Edward C. Cabell	W	FL	March 4, 1847; Previous service, 1845–1846.	4th term*	Left the House in 1853.
17	Thomas L. Clingman	W	NC-01	March 4, 1847; Previous service, 1843–1845.	4th term*	
18	Williamson R. W. Cobb	D	AL-06	March 4, 1847	3rd term	
19	Alexander Evans	W	MD-05	March 4, 1847	3rd term	Left the House in 1853.
20	Willard P. Hall	D	MO-04	March 4, 1847	3rd term	Left the House in 1853.
21	Sampson W. Harris	D	AL-03	March 4, 1847	3rd term	
22	Robert W. Johnson	D	AR	March 4, 1847	3rd term	Left the House in 1853.
23	David Outlaw	W	NC-09	March 4, 1847	3rd term	Left the House in 1853.
24	John L. Robinson	D	IN-03	March 4, 1847	3rd term	Left the House in 1853.
25	Charles H. Peaslee	D	NH-02	March 4, 1847	3rd term	Left the House in 1853.
26	John L. Taylor	W	OH-08	March 4, 1847	3rd term	
27	Amos Tuck	W	NH-01	March 4, 1847	3rd term	Left the House in 1853.
28	Abraham W. Venable	D	NC-05	March 4, 1847	3rd term	Left the House in 1853.
29	Richard K. Meade	D	VA-02	August 5, 1847	3rd term	Left the House in 1853.
30	William A. Richardson	D	IL-05	December 6, 1847	3rd term	
31	Horace Mann	W	MA-08	April 3, 1848	3rd term	Left the House in 1853.
32	Daniel Wallace	D	SC-01	June 12, 1848	3rd term	Left the House in 1853.
33	John McQueen	D	SC-04	February 12, 1849	3rd term	
34	Charles Allen	W	MA-05	March 4, 1849	2nd term	Left the House in 1853.
35	William S. Ashe	D	NC-07	March 4, 1849	2nd term	
36	Thomas H. Averett	D	VA-03	March 4, 1849	2nd term	Left the House in 1853.
37	James M. H. Beale	D	VA-14	March 4, 1849; Previous service, 1833–1837.	4th term*	Left the House in 1853.
38	Henry Bennett	W	NY-22	March 4, 1849	2nd term	
39	William H. Bissell	D	IL-01	March 4, 1849	2nd term	
40	Richard Bowie	W	MD-01	March 4, 1849	2nd term	Left the House in 1853.
41	George Briggs	W	NY-05	March 4, 1849	2nd term	Left the House in 1853.
42	James Brooks	W	NY-06	March 4, 1849	2nd term	Left the House in 1853.
43	Lorenzo Burrows	W	NY-34	March 4, 1849	2nd term	Left the House in 1853.
44	Joseph Cable	D	OH-17	March 4, 1849	2nd term	Left the House in 1853.
45	Joseph P. Caldwell	W	NC-02	March 4, 1849	2nd term	Left the House in 1853.
46	Lewis D. Campbell	W	OH-02	March 4, 1849	2nd term	
47	David K. Cartter	D	OH-18	March 4, 1849	2nd term	Left the House in 1853.
48	Joseph R. Chandler	W	PA-02	March 4, 1849	2nd term	
49	Chauncey F. Cleveland	D	CT-03	March 4, 1849	2nd term	Left the House in 1853.
50	William F. Colcock	D	SC-07	March 4, 1849	2nd term	Left the House in 1853.
51	Milo M. Dimmick	D	PA-10	March 4, 1849	2nd term	Left the House in 1853.
52	David T. Disney	D	OH-01	March 4, 1849	2nd term	
53	James D. Doty	D	WI-03	March 4, 1849; Previous service, 1839–1841.	4th term*	Left the House in 1853.
54	James H. Duncan	W	MA-03	March 4, 1849	2nd term	Left the House in 1853.
55	Cyrus L. Dunham	D	IN-02	March 4, 1849	2nd term	
56	Charles Durkee	D	WI-01	March 4, 1849	2nd term	Left the House in 1853.
57	Henry A. Edmundson	D	VA-12	March 4, 1849	2nd term	
58	Graham N. Fitch	D	IN-09	March 4, 1849	2nd term	Left the House in 1853.
59	Orin Fowler	W	MA-09	March 4, 1849	2nd term	Died on September 3, 1852.
60	Thomas J. D. Fuller	D	ME-07	March 4, 1849	2nd term	
61	Alfred Gilmore	D	PA-24	March 4, 1849	2nd term	Left the House in 1853.
62	Willis A. Gorman	D	IN-06	March 4, 1849	2nd term	Left the House in 1853.
63	William T. Hamilton	D	MD-02	March 4, 1849	2nd term	
64	Edward Hammond	D	MD-03	March 4, 1849	2nd term	Left the House in 1853.
65	Isham G. Harris	D	TN-09	March 4, 1849	2nd term	Left the House in 1853.
66	William Hebard	W	VT-02	March 4, 1849	2nd term	Left the House in 1853.
67	Harry Hibbard	D	NH-04	March 4, 1849	2nd term	
68	Alexander Holladay	D	VA-08	March 4, 1849	2nd term	Left the House in 1853.
69	Volney Howard	D	TX-02	March 4, 1849	2nd term	Left the House in 1853.
70	John W. Howe	W	PA-22	March 4, 1849	2nd term	Left the House in 1853.
71	William F. Hunter	W	OH-15	March 4, 1849	2nd term	Left the House in 1853.
72	George G. King	W	RI-01	March 4, 1849	2nd term	Left the House in 1853.
73	Preston King	D	NY-18	March 4, 1849; Previous service, 1843–1847.	4th term*	Left the House in 1853.
74	Humphrey Marshall	W	KY-07	March 4, 1849	2nd term	Resigned on August 4, 1852.
75	John C. Mason	D	KY-09	March 4, 1849	2nd term	Left the House in 1853.
76	James Xavier McLanahan	D	PA-16	March 4, 1849	2nd term	Left the House in 1853.
77	Fayette McMullen	D	VA-13	March 4, 1849	2nd term	
78	John Millson	D	VA-01	March 4, 1849	2nd term	
79	Henry D. Moore	W	PA-03	March 4, 1849	2nd term	Left the House in 1853.
80	Edson B. Olds	D	OH-09	March 4, 1849	2nd term	
81	James L. Orr	D	SC-02	March 4, 1849	2nd term	
82	Paulus Powell	D	VA-05	March 4, 1849	2nd term	
83	John Robbins	D	PA-04	March 4, 1849	2nd term	
84	Thomas Ross	D	PA-06	March 4, 1849	2nd term	Left the House in 1853.
85	William A. Sackett	W	NY-27	March 4, 1849	2nd term	Left the House in 1853.
86	John H. Savage	D	TN-04	March 4, 1849	2nd term	Left the House in 1853.
87	Abraham M. Schermerhorn	W	NY-28	March 4, 1849	2nd term	Left the House in 1853.
88	John L. Schoolcraft	W	NY-13	March 4, 1849	2nd term	Left the House in 1853.
89	Edward Stanly	W	NC-08	March 4, 1849; Previous service, 1837–1843.	5th term*	Left the House in 1853.
90	Richard H. Stanton	D	KY-10	March 4, 1849	2nd term	
91	Thaddeus Stevens	W	PA-08	March 4, 1849	2nd term	Left the House in 1853.
92	Charles Sweetser	D	OH-10	March 4, 1849	2nd term	Left the House in 1853.
93	Albert G. Watkins	W	TN-02	March 4, 1849	2nd term	Left the House in 1853.
94	Isaac Wildrick	D	NJ-03	March 4, 1849	2nd term	Left the House in 1853.
95	Christopher H. Williams	W	TN-11	March 4, 1849; Previous service, 1837–1843.	5th term*	Left the House in 1853.
96	James Meacham	W	VT-03	December 3, 1849	2nd term	
97	Joseph W. Jackson	D	GA-01	March 4, 1850	2nd term	Left the House in 1853.
98	Alexander G. Penn	D	LA-03	December 30, 1850	2nd term	Left the House in 1853.
99	James Abercrombie	W	AL-02	March 4, 1851	1st term	
100	William Aiken, Jr.	D	SC-06	March 4, 1851	1st term	
101	Willis Allen	D	IL-02	March 4, 1851	1st term	
102	John Allison	W	PA-20	March 4, 1851	1st term	Left the House in 1853.
103	Charles Andrews	D	ME-04	March 4, 1851	1st term	Died on April 30, 1852.
104	John Appleton	D	ME-02	March 4, 1851	1st term	Left the House in 1853.
105	William Appleton	W	MA-01	March 4, 1851	1st term	
106	Leander Babcock	D	NY-23	March 4, 1851	1st term	Left the House in 1853.
107	David J. Bailey	D	GA-03	March 4, 1851	1st term	
108	Nelson Barrere	W	OH-07	March 4, 1851	1st term	Left the House in 1853.
109	Thomas Bartlett, Jr.	D	VT-04	March 4, 1851	1st term	Left the House in 1853.
110	Hiram Bell	W	OH-03	March 4, 1851	1st term	Left the House in 1853.
111	Thomas Marshal Bibighaus	W	PA-14	March 4, 1851	1st term	Left the House in 1853.
112	Obadiah Bowne	W	NY-02	March 4, 1851	1st term	Left the House in 1853.
113	John H. Boyd	W	NY-14	March 4, 1851	1st term	Left the House in 1853.
114	John Bragg	D	AL-01	March 4, 1851	1st term	Left the House in 1853.
115	John C. Breckinridge	D	KY-08	March 4, 1851	1st term	
116	Samuel Brenton	W	IN-10	March 4, 1851	1st term	Left the House in 1853.
117	George H. Brown	W	NJ-04	March 4, 1851	1st term	Left the House in 1853.
118	Alexander H. Buell	D	NY-17	March 4, 1851	1st term	Died on January 29, 1853.
119	George H. Busby	D	OH-11	March 4, 1851	1st term	Left the House in 1853.
120	Thompson Campbell	D	IL-06	March 4, 1851	1st term	Left the House in 1853.
121	John Caskie	D	VA-06	March 4, 1851	1st term	
122	Charles Chapman	W	CT-01	March 4, 1851	1st term	Left the House in 1853.
123	Elijah W. Chastain	D	GA-05	March 4, 1851	1st term	
124	William M. Churchwell	D	TN-03	March 4, 1851	1st term	
125	Lincoln Clark	D	IA-02	March 4, 1851	1st term	Left the House in 1853.
126	James L. Conger	W	MI-03	March 4, 1851	1st term	Left the House in 1853.
127	Joseph Stewart Cottman	W	MD-06	March 4, 1851	1st term	Left the House in 1853.
128	William Cullom	W	TN-08	March 4, 1851	1st term	
129	Carlton B. Curtis	D	PA-23	March 4, 1851	1st term	
130	John F. Darby	W	MO-01	March 4, 1851	1st term	Left the House in 1853.
131	John G. Davis	D	IN-07	March 4, 1851	1st term	
132	George T. Davis	W	MA-06	March 4, 1851	1st term	Left the House in 1853.
133	John L. Dawson	D	PA-18	March 4, 1851	1st term	
134	Gilbert Dean	D	NY-08	March 4, 1851	1st term	
135	Alfred Dockery	W	NC-03	March 4, 1851; Previous service, 1845–1847.	2nd term*	Left the House in 1853.
136	Ben C. Eastman	D	WI-02	March 4, 1851	1st term	
137	Alfred Peck Edgerton	D	OH-05	March 4, 1851	1st term	
138	Presley Ewing	W	KY-03	March 4, 1851	1st term	
139	Charles J. Faulkner	W	VA-10	March 4, 1851	1st term	
140	Orlando B. Ficklin	D	IL-03	March 4, 1851; Previous service, 1843–1849.	4th term*	Left the House in 1853.
141	Thomas B. Florence	D	PA-01	March 4, 1851	1st term	
142	John G. Floyd	D	NY-01	March 4, 1851; Previous service, 1839–1843.	3rd term*	Left the House in 1853.
143	John D. Freeman	W	MS-03	March 4, 1851	1st term	Left the House in 1853.
144	Henry M. Fuller	W	PA-11	March 4, 1851	1st term	Left the House in 1853.
145	James Gamble	D	PA-13	March 4, 1851	1st term	
146	James M. Gaylord	D	OH-13	March 4, 1851	1st term	Left the House in 1853.
147	Frederick W. Green	D	OH-06	March 4, 1851	1st term	
148	Benjamin E. Grey	W	KY-02	March 4, 1851	1st term	
149	Robert Goodenow	W	ME-03	March 4, 1851	1st term	Left the House in 1853.
150	John Z. Goodrich	W	MA-07	March 4, 1851	1st term	
151	Galusha A. Grow	D	PA-12	March 4, 1851	1st term	
152	Emanuel B. Hart	D	NY-03	March 4, 1851	1st term	Left the House in 1853.
153	Augustus P. Hascall	W	NY-33	March 4, 1851	1st term	Left the House in 1853.
154	Solomon G. Haven	W	NY-32	March 4, 1851	1st term	
155	John H. H. Haws	W	NY-04	March 4, 1851	1st term	Left the House in 1853.
156	Thomas A. Hendricks	D	IN-05	March 4, 1851	1st term	
157	Bernhart Henn	D	IA-01	March 4, 1851	1st term	
158	Junius Hillyer	D	GA-06	March 4, 1851	1st term	
159	Jerediah Horsford	W	NY-29	March 4, 1851	1st term	Left the House in 1853.
160	George S. Houston	D	AL-05	March 4, 1851; Previous service, 1841–1849.	5th term*	
161	Thomas Y. Howe, Jr.	D	NY-25	March 4, 1851	1st term	Left the House in 1853.
162	Alexander Harper	W	OH-14	March 4, 1851; Previous service, 1837–1839 and 1843–1847.	4th term**	Left the House in 1853.
163	Thomas M. Howe	W	PA-21	March 4, 1851	1st term	
164	Colin M. Ingersoll	D	CT-02	March 4, 1851	1st term	
165	Willard Ives	D	NY-19	March 4, 1851	1st term	Left the House in 1853.
166	Timothy Jenkins	D	NY-20	March 4, 1851; Previous service, 1845–1849.	3rd term*	Left the House in 1853.
167	James Johnson	D	GA-02	March 4, 1851	1st term	Left the House in 1853.
168	John Johnson	D	OH-16	March 4, 1851	1st term	Left the House in 1853.
169	Jehu Glancy Jones	D	PA-09	March 4, 1851	1st term	Left the House in 1853.
170	Daniel T. Jones	D	NY-24	March 4, 1851	1st term	
171	Joseph H. Kuhns	W	PA-19	March 4, 1851	1st term	Left the House in 1853.
172	William H. Kurtz	D	PA-15	March 4, 1851	1st term	
173	Joseph A. Landry	W	LA-02	March 4, 1851	1st term	Left the House in 1853.
174	John Letcher	D	VA-11	March 4, 1851	1st term	
175	James Lockhart	D	IN-01	March 4, 1851	1st term	Left the House in 1853.
176	Daniel Mace	D	IN-08	March 4, 1851	1st term	
177	Moses Macdonald	D	ME-01	March 4, 1851	1st term	
178	Edward C. Marshall	D	CA	March 4, 1851	1st term	Left the House in 1853.
179	Frederick S. Martin	W	NY-31	March 4, 1851	1st term	Left the House in 1853.
180	Louis St. Martin	D	LA-01	March 4, 1851	1st term	Left the House in 1853.
181	Joseph W. McCorkle	D	CA	March 4, 1851	1st term	Left the House in 1853.
182	John McNair	D	PA-05	March 4, 1851	1st term	
183	John G. Miller	W	MO-03	March 4, 1851	1st term	
184	Ahiman L. Miner	W	VT-01	March 4, 1851	1st term	Left the House in 1853.
185	Richard S. Molony	D	IL-04	March 4, 1851	1st term	Left the House in 1853.
186	John Moore	W	LA-04	March 4, 1851; Previous service, 1840–1843.	3rd term*	Left the House in 1853.
187	James T. Morehead	W	NC-04	March 4, 1851	1st term	Left the House in 1853.
188	John A. Morrison	D	PA-07	March 4, 1851	1st term	Left the House in 1853.
189	Charles Murphey	W	GA-04	March 4, 1851	1st term	Left the House in 1853.
190	William Murray	D	NY-09	March 4, 1851	1st term	
191	Benjamin D. Nabers	W	MS-01	March 4, 1851	1st term	Left the House in 1853.
192	Eben Newton	W	OH-19	March 4, 1851	1st term	Left the House in 1853.
193	Andrew Parker	D	PA-17	March 4, 1851	1st term	Left the House in 1853.
194	Samuel W. Parker	W	IN-04	March 4, 1851	1st term	
195	Ebenezer J. Penniman	W	MI-01	March 4, 1851	1st term	Left the House in 1853.
196	Jared Perkins	W	NH-03	March 4, 1851	1st term	Left the House in 1853.
197	William H. Polk	D	TN-06	March 4, 1851	1st term	Left the House in 1853.
198	Gilchrist Porter	W	MO-02	March 4, 1851	1st term	Left the House in 1853.
199	Rodman M. Price	D	NJ-05	March 4, 1851	1st term	Left the House in 1853.
200	Robert Rantoul, Jr.	D	MA-02	March 4, 1851	1st term	Died on August 7, 1852.
201	George R. Riddle	D	DE	March 4, 1851	1st term	
202	Reuben Robie	D	NY-30	March 4, 1851	1st term	Left the House in 1853.
203	Joseph Russell	D	NY-15	March 4, 1851; Previous service, 1845–1847.	2nd term*	Left the House in 1853.
204	Marius Schoonmaker	W	NY-10	March 4, 1851	1st term	Left the House in 1853.
205	Zeno Scudder	W	MA-10	March 4, 1851	1st term	
206	Richardson A. Scurry	D	TX-01	March 4, 1851	1st term	Left the House in 1853.
207	David L. Seymour	D	NY-12	March 4, 1851; Previous service, 1843–1845.	2nd term*	Left the House in 1853.
208	Origen S. Seymour	D	CT-04	March 4, 1851	1st term	
209	Charles Skelton	D	NJ-02	March 4, 1851	1st term	
210	Ephraim K. Smart	D	ME-05	March 4, 1851; Previous service, 1847–1849.	2nd term*	Left the House in 1853.
211	William R. Smith	W	AL-04	March 4, 1851	1st term	
212	William W. Snow	D	NY-21	March 4, 1851	1st term	Left the House in 1853.
213	Benjamin Stanton	W	OH-04	March 4, 1851	1st term	Left the House in 1853.
214	Abraham P. Stephens	D	NY-07	March 4, 1851	1st term	Left the House in 1853.
215	James W. Stone	D	KY-05	March 4, 1851; Previous service, 1843–1845.	2nd term*	Left the House in 1853.
216	Nathan T. Stratton	D	NJ-01	March 4, 1851	1st term	
217	James F. Strother	W	VA-09	March 4, 1851	1st term	Left the House in 1853.
218	Charles E. Stuart	D	MI-02	March 4, 1851; Previous service, 1847–1849.	2nd term*	Left the House in 1853.
219	Josiah Sutherland	D	NY-11	March 4, 1851	1st term	Left the House in 1853.
220	Benjamin Thompson	W	MA-04	March 4, 1851; Previous service, 1845–1847.	2nd term*	Died on September 24, 1852.
221	George W. Thompson	D	VA-15	March 4, 1851	1st term	Resigned on July 30, 1852.
222	Benjamin Babock Thurston	D	RI-02	March 4, 1851; Previous service, 1847–1849.	2nd term*	
223	Norton S. Townshend	D	OH-21	March 4, 1851	1st term	Left the House in 1853.
224	Henry S. Walbridge	W	NY-26	March 4, 1851	1st term	Left the House in 1853.
225	Thomas Y. Walsh	W	MD-04	March 4, 1851	1st term	Left the House in 1853.
226	William T. Ward	W	KY-04	March 4, 1851	1st term	Left the House in 1853.
227	Israel Washburn, Jr.	W	ME-06	March 4, 1851	1st term	
228	John Welch	W	OH-12	March 4, 1851	1st term	Left the House in 1853.
229	John Wells	W	NY-16	March 4, 1851	1st term	Left the House in 1853.
230	Addison White	W	KY-06	March 4, 1851	1st term	Left the House in 1853.
231	Alexander White	W	AL-07	March 4, 1851	1st term	Left the House in 1853.
232	John A. Wilcox	W	MS-02	March 4, 1851	1st term	Left the House in 1853.
233	Richard Yates	W	IL-07	March 4, 1851	1st term	
	Isaac Reed	W	ME-04	June 25, 1852	1st term	Left the House in 1853.
	Sherrard Clemens	D	VA-15	December 6, 1852	1st term	Left the House in 1853.
	William Preston	W	KY-07	December 6, 1852	1st term	
	Francis B. Fay	W	MA-02	December 13, 1852	1st term	Left the House in 1853.
	Edward P. Little	D	MA-09	December 13, 1852	1st term	Left the House in 1853.
	Lorenzo Sabine	W	MA-04	December 13, 1852	1st term	Left the House in 1853.

== Delegates ==
Rank	Delegate	Party	District	Seniority date (Previous service, if any)	No.# of term(s)	Notes
1	Henry Hastings Sibley	D	MN	July 7, 1849; Previous service, 1848–1849.	3rd term*	
2	John Milton Bernhisel	D	UT	March 4, 1851	1st term	
3	Joseph Lane	D	OR	March 4, 1851	1st term	
4	Richard Hanson Weightman	D	NM	March 4, 1851	1st term	

== See also ==
- 32nd United States Congress
- List of United States congressional districts
- List of United States senators in the 32nd Congress
