= 1859 New Hampshire gubernatorial election =

- March 8, 1859
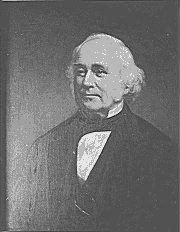

Nominee	Ichabod Goodwin	Asa P. Cate
Party	Republican	Democratic
Popular vote	36,326	32,802
Percentage	52.53%	47.43%
- County results Goodwin: 50–60% 60–70% Cate: 50–60%
Governor before election
William Haile
Republican
Elected Governor
Ichabod Goodwin
Republican

The 1859 New Hampshire gubernatorial election was held on March 8, 1859.

Incumbent Republican Governor William Haile did not stand for re-election.

Republican nominee Ichabod Goodwin defeated Democratic nominee Asa P. Cate with 52.53% of the vote.

== General election ==
=== Candidates ===
- Asa P. Cate, Democratic, attorney, former president of the New Hampshire Senate, Democratic nominee for governor in 1858
- Ichabod Goodwin, Republican, former member of the New Hampshire House of Representatives, Whig nominee for governor in 1856

=== Results ===
1859 New Hampshire gubernatorial election (Note: Some sources give Goodwin's total as 36,296. The result given is taken from the New Hampshire Senate Journal.)
Party	Candidate	Votes	%	±%
Republican	Ichabod Goodwin	36,326	52.53%	
Democratic	Asa P. Cate	32,802	47.43%	
Scattering		27	0.04%	
Majority		3,524	5.10%	
Turnout		69,155		
Republican hold		Swing		
