= 1857 New Hampshire gubernatorial election =

- March 10, 1857
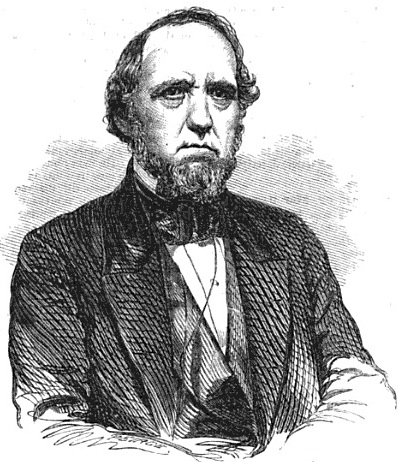

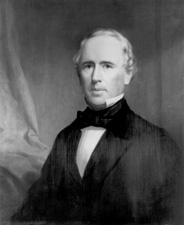
Nominee	William Haile	John S. Wells
Party	Republican	Democratic
Popular vote	34,216	31,214
Percentage	51.93%	47.38%
- County results Haile: 50–60% 60–70% Wells: 50–60%
Governor before election
Ralph Metcalf
Know Nothing
Elected Governor
William Haile
Republican

The 1857 New Hampshire gubernatorial election was held on March 10, 1857.

Incumbent Know Nothing Governor Ralph Metcalf did not stand for re-election.

Republican nominee William Haile defeated Democratic nominee John S. Wells with 51.93% of the vote.

== General election ==
=== Major candidates ===
- William Haile, Republican, former President of the New Hampshire Senate
- John S. Wells, Democratic, former U.S. Senator, Democratic nominee for Governor in 1856

=== Minor candidate ===
- Charles Brickett Haddock, Whig

=== Results ===
1857 New Hampshire gubernatorial election (Note: Some sources give the result as Haile 34,214, Wells 31,209, scattering 452. The result given is taken from the New Hampshire Senate Journal.)
Party	Candidate	Votes	%	±%
Republican	William Haile	34,216	51.93%	
Democratic	John S. Wells	31,214	47.38%	
Scattering (Note: Contemporary newspapers indicate that around 209 of the scattering votes were cast for Charles Brickett Haddock.)		452	0.69%	
Majority		3,002	4.55%	
Turnout		65,882		
Republican gain from Know Nothing		Swing		
