= Nathaniel C. Barker =

- Born: September 28, 1836; Piermont, New Hampshire, U.S.
- Died: March 7, 1904 (aged 67)
- Burial place: Last Rest Cemetery, Merrimack, New Hampshire; 42°52.034′N 71°29.767′W
- Military career
- Allegiance: United States of America
- Branch: United States Army
- Service years: August 21, 1862 to May 25, 1865
- Rank: Sergeant
- Unit: 11th Regiment New Hampshire Volunteer Infantry - Company E
- Conflicts: Battle of Spotsylvania
- Awards: Medal of Honor

Sergeant Nathaniel C. Barker (September 28, 1836 – March 7, 1904) was an American soldier who fought in the American Civil War. Barker was awarded the country's highest award for bravery during combat, the Medal of Honor, for his action in Spotsylvania County, Virginia, during the Battle of Spotsylvania on May 12, 1864. He was presented with the award on 23 September 1897.

== Biography ==
Barker enlisted into the 11th New Hampshire Regiment Volunteer Infantry Company E on 21 August 1862. During the Battle of Spotsylvania six of the color bearers of Barker's company were killed on May 12, considered the bloodiest day of the battle. Barker took the regiment's two flags and advanced with them the rest of the duration of the battle.

Barker was wounded on 7 June 1864 in Cold Harbor, Virginia and was later discharged from duty on 25 May 1865. He is buried at Last Rest Cemetery in Merrimack, New Hampshire.

== Medal of Honor citation ==
Six Color Bearers of the regiment having been killed, Sergeant Barker voluntarily took both flags of the regiment and carried them through the remainder of the battle.

== See also ==
- List of American Civil War Medal of Honor recipients: A–F
