= Walter Harriman =

Walter Harriman may refer to:

- Walter Harriman (politician) (1817–1884), American politician, Governor of New Hampshire
- Walter Harriman (Stargate), a fictional character on the Stargate universe
