= Governor Berry =

Governor Berry may refer to:

- James Henderson Berry (1841–1913), 14th Governor of Arkansas
- Nathaniel S. Berry (1796–1894), 28th Governor of New Hampshire
- Tom Berry (South Dakota politician) (1879–1951), 14th Governor of South Dakota
