= 1863 New Hampshire gubernatorial election =

- March 10, 1863
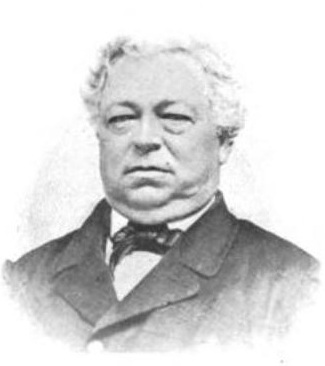

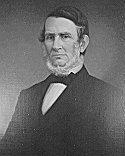

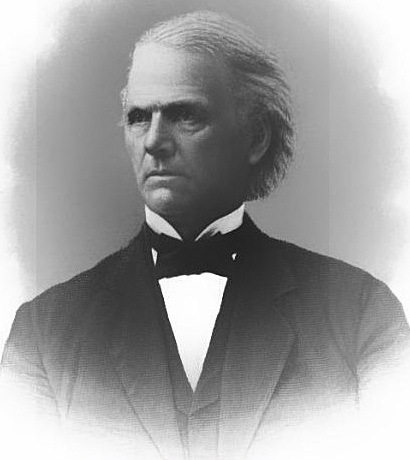
Nominee	Joseph A. Gilmore	Ira Allen Eastman	Walter Harriman
Party	Republican	Democratic	War Democratic
Electoral vote	192	133	1
Popular vote	29,035	32,833	4,372
Percentage	43.63%	49.34%	6.57%
- County results Gilmore: 40–50% 50–60% Eastman: 40–50% 50–60%
Governor before election
Nathaniel S. Berry
Republican
Elected Governor
Joseph A. Gilmore
Republican

The 1863 New Hampshire gubernatorial election was held on March 10, 1863.

Incumbent Republican Governor Nathaniel S. Berry did not stand for re-election.

Republican nominee Joseph A. Gilmore defeated Democratic nominee Ira Allen Eastman and Union Democrat Walter Harriman.

Since no candidate received a majority in the popular vote, Gilmore was elected by the New Hampshire General Court per the state constitution.

== General election ==
=== Candidates ===
- Ira Allen Eastman, Democratic, former U.S. Representative, former judge of the New Hampshire Supreme Court
- Joseph A. Gilmore, Republican, former President of the New Hampshire Senate
- Walter Harriman, Union (or War) Democrat, colonel of the 11th New Hampshire Regiment, former State Senator

=== Results ===
1863 New Hampshire gubernatorial election (Note: Most sources give scattering votes as 363. The result given is taken from the New Hampshire Senate Journal.)
Party	Candidate	Votes	%	±%
Democratic	Ira Allen Eastman	32,833	49.34%	
Republican	Joseph A. Gilmore	29,035	43.63%	
War Democratic	Walter Harriman	4,372	6.57%	
Scattering		303	0.46%	
Majority		3,798	5.71%	
Turnout		66,543		

=== Legislative election ===
As no candidate received a majority of the vote, the New Hampshire General Court was required to decide the election, both Houses in convention choosing among the top two vote-getters, Eastman and Gilmore. (Note: Nevertheless, one vote was cast for Harriman, who finished third.) The legislative election was held on June 4, 1863.

Legislative election
Party	Candidate	Votes	%
Republican	Joseph A. Gilmore	192	58.89%
Democratic	Ira Allen Eastman	133	40.80%
War Democratic	Walter Harriman	1	0.31%
Turnout		326	
Republican hold			
