= 1856 New Hampshire gubernatorial election =

- March 11, 1856
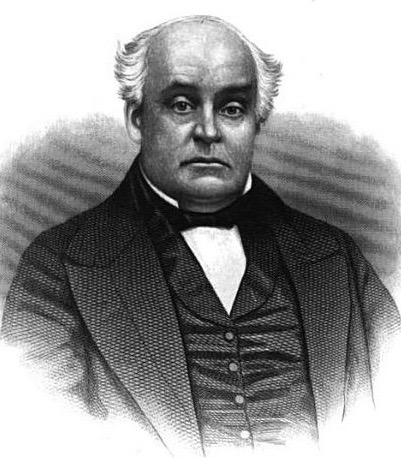

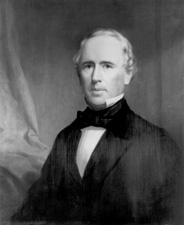
Nominee	Ralph Metcalf	John S. Wells
Party	Know Nothing	Democratic
Popular vote	32,119	32,031
Percentage	48.15%	48.02%
- County results Metcalf: 40–50% 50–60% Wells: 40–50% 50–60%
Governor before election
Ralph Metcalf
Know Nothing
Elected Governor
Ralph Metcalf
Know Nothing

The 1856 New Hampshire gubernatorial election was held on March 11, 1856, in order to elect the governor of New Hampshire. Incumbent Know Nothing governor Ralph Metcalf won re-election against Democratic nominee and former United States senator from New Hampshire John S. Wells and Whig nominee and former member of the New Hampshire House of Representatives Ichabod Goodwin.Since no candidate received a majority in the popular vote, Metcalf was elected by the New Hampshire General Court per the state constitution.

== General election ==
On election day, March 11, 1856, incumbent Know Nothing governor Ralph Metcalf won re-election by a margin of 88 votes against his foremost opponent Democratic nominee John S. Wells, but because no candidate received a majority of the popular vote, a separate election was held by the New Hampshire General Court, which chose Governor Metcalf as the winner. He thereby retained Know Nothing control over the office of governor. Metcalf was sworn in for his second term on June 7, 1856.

=== Results ===
New Hampshire gubernatorial election, 1856
Party	Candidate	Votes	%
Know Nothing	Ralph Metcalf (incumbent)	32,119	48.15
Democratic	John S. Wells	32,031	48.02
Whig	Ichabod Goodwin	2,360	3.54
	Scattering	193	0.29
Total votes		66,703	100.00
Know Nothing hold			
