= Governor Harriman =

Governor Harriman may refer to:

- W. Averell Harriman (1891–1986), 48th Governor of New York
- Walter Harriman (governor) (1817–1884), 31st Governor of New Hampshire
