= Governor Metcalfe =

Governor Metcalfe may refer to:

- Charles Metcalfe, 1st Baron Metcalfe (1785–1846), Governor of Agra from 1834 to 1835, Acting Governor-General of India from 1835 to 1836, Governor of Jamaica from 1839 to 1842, and Governor General of the Province of Canada from 1843 to 1845
- Richard Lee Metcalfe (1861–1954), Military Governor of Panama Canal Zone from 1913 to 1914
- Thomas Metcalfe (Kentucky politician) (1780–1855), 10th Governor of Kentucky

== See also ==
- Ralph Metcalf (New Hampshire politician) (1796–1858), 25th Governor of New Hampshire
