= List of United States senators in the 32nd Congress =

This is a complete list of United States senators during the 32nd United States Congress listed by seniority from March 4, 1851, to March 3, 1853.

Order of service is based on the commencement of the senator's first term. Behind this is former service as a senator (only giving the senator seniority within their new incoming class), service as vice president, a House member, a cabinet secretary, or a governor of a state. The final factor is the population of the senator's state.

Senators who were sworn in during the middle of the two-year congressional term (up until the last senator who was not sworn in early after winning the November 1852 election) are listed at the end of the list with no number.

== Terms of service ==
Class	Terms of service of senators that expired in years
Class 2	Terms of service of senators that expired in 1853 (AL, AR, DE, GA, IA, IL, KY, LA, MA, ME, MI, MS, NC, NH, NJ, RI, SC, TN, TX, and VA.)
Class 3	Terms of service of senators that expired in 1855 (CA, CT, DE, FL, IN, MA, MD, ME, MI, MO, MS, NJ, NY, OH, PA, RI, TN, TX, VA, VT, and WI.)
Class 1	Terms of service of senators that expired in 1857 (AL, AR, CA, CT, FL, GA, IA, IL, IN, KY, LA, MD, MO, NC, NH, NY, OH, PA, SC, VT, and WI.)

== U.S. Senate seniority list ==
U.S. Senate seniority
Rank	Senator (party-state)	Seniority date	Other factors
1	Willie Person Mangum (W-NC)	November 25, 1840	
2	John Macpherson Berrien (W-GA)	March 4, 1841	Former senator
3	Jacob Welsh Miller (W-NJ)	March 4, 1841	
4	James Alfred Pearce (W-MD)	March 4, 1843	Former representative (6 years); Maryland 15th in population (1840)
5	William Upham (W-VT)	March 4, 1843	
6	David Rice Atchison (D-MO)	October 14, 1843	
7	Jesse D. Bright (D-IN)	March 4, 1845	Indiana 10th in population (1840)
8	John Davis (W-MA)	March 24, 1845	
9	Thomas Jefferson Rusk (D-TX)	February 21, 1846	
10	Samuel Houston (D-TX)	February 26, 1846	
11	George Edmund Badger (W-NC)	November 25, 1846	
12	Andrew Pickens Butler (D-SC)	December 4, 1846	
13	James M. Mason (D-VA)	January 21, 1847	
14	Robert M. T. Hunter (D-VA)	March 4, 1847	Former representative (8 years); Virginia 4th in population (1840)
15	Joseph Rogers Underwood (W-KY)	March 4, 1847	Former representative (8 years); Kentucky 6th in population (1840)
16	Stephen A. Douglas (D-IL)	March 4, 1847	Former representative (4 years)
17	John P. Hale (FS-NH)	March 4, 1847	Former representative (2 years)
18	Alpheus Felch (D-MI)	March 4, 1847	Former governor
19	James Ware Bradbury (D-ME)	March 4, 1847	Maine 13th in population (1840)
20	Henry Stuart Foote (D-MS)	March 4, 1847	Mississippi 17th in population (1840)
21	Solomon Weathersbee Downs (D-LA)	March 4, 1847	Louisiana 19th in population (1840)
22	John Hopkins Clarke (W-RI)	March 4, 1847	Rhode Island 24th in population (1840)
23	Presley Spruance (W-DE)	March 4, 1847	Delaware 26th in population (1840)
25	Jefferson Davis (D-MS)	March 4, 1847	August 10, 1847
26	John Bell (W-TN)	November 22, 1847	
27	Solon Borland (W-AR)	March 30, 1848	
28	William K. Sebastian (W-AR)	May 12, 1848	
29	Hannibal Hamlin (W-ME)	June 8, 1848	Former representative (4 years); Maine 13th in population (1840)
30	Henry Dodge (D-WI)	June 8, 1848	Former delegate (4 years); Wisconsin 28th in population (1840)
31	Isaac Pigeon Walker (D-WI)	June 8, 1848	Wisconsin 28th in population (1840)
32	William Rufus de Vane King (D-AL)	July 1, 1848	
33	Augustus Caesar Dodge (D-IA)	December 7, 1848	Former delegate (6 years)
34	George Wallace Jones (D-IA)	December 7, 1848	Former delegate (3 years)
35	Lewis Cass (D-MI)	March 4, 1849	Former senator
36	Salmon P. Chase (FS-OH)	March 4, 1849	
37	William Dawson (W-GA)	March 4, 1849	
38	Jackson Morton (W-FL)	March 4, 1849	
39	Moses Norris, Jr. (D-NH)	March 4, 1849	
40	William H. Seward (W-NY)	March 4, 1849	
41	Truman Smith (W-CT)	March 4, 1849	
42	Pierre Soulé (D-LA)	March 4, 1849	
43	James Whitcomb (D-IN)	March 4, 1849	
44	James Cooper (W-PA)	March 4, 1849	
45	Henry Clay (W-KY)	March 4, 1849	
46	James Shields (D-IL)	October 27, 1849	
47	Jeremiah Clemens (D-AL)	November 30, 1849	
48	Thomas Pratt (D-MD)	January 12, 1850	
49	Franklin Elmore (D-SC)	April 11, 1850	
50	Robert Barnwell (D-SC)	June 4, 1850	
51	Thomas Ewing (W-OH)	July 20, 1850	
52	Robert Winthrop (W-MA)	July 22, 1850	Former representative
53	William M. Gwin (D-CA)	September 9, 1850	Former representative
54	Robert Rhett (D-SC)	December 18, 1850	Former representative
55	Robert Rantoul, Jr. (D-MA)	February 1, 1851	
56	Solomon Foot (R-VT)	March 4, 1851	Former representative
57	James A. Bayard Jr. (D-DE)	March 4, 1851	
58	Stephen Mallory (D-FL)	March 4, 1851	
59	Henry S. Geyer (W-MO)	March 4, 1851	
60	Richard Brodhead (D-PA)	March 4, 1851	Former representative
61	Charles T. James (D-RI)	March 4, 1851	
62	James C. Jones (W-TN)	March 4, 1851	
	Benjamin Wade (W-OH)	March 15, 1851	
	Hamilton Fish (W-NY)	December 1, 1851	Former representative, former governor and former lieutenant governor
	John J. McRae (D-MS)	December 1, 1851	
	Walker Brooke (W-MS)	February 18, 1852	
	Stephen Adams (W-MS)	March 17, 1852	Former representative
	William F. De Saussure (D-SC)	May 10, 1852	
	Isaac Toucey (D-CT)	May 12, 1852	
	Robert M. Charlton (D-GA)	May 31, 1852	
	David Meriwether (D-KY)	July 6, 1852	
	Archibald Dixon (W-KY)	September 1, 1852	
	Charles W. Cathcart (D-IN)	December 6, 1852	Former representative
	Benjamin Fitzpatrick (D-AL)	January 14, 1853	Former governor
	Samuel Shethar Phelps (W-VT)	January 17, 1853	
	John Pettit (D-IN)	January 18, 1853	Former representative

== See also ==
- 32nd United States Congress
- List of United States representatives in the 32nd Congress
