= Theodore Hinsdale =

American politician

Theodore Hinsdale (February 3, 1819 – August 19, 1880) was an American lawyer and politician from New York.

== Life ==
Hinsdale was born on February 3, 1819, in Middletown, Connecticut, the son of John Hinsdale and Harriet Johnson.

Hinsdale attended Wesleyan University, graduating from there in 1836. In 1837, he began studying law in Waterford, New York. In 1837, he moved to New York City and continued his law studies there. He was admitted to the bar in 1840 and began practicing law in New York City. He moved to Brooklyn in 1846. He was elected Alderman for the Third Ward in 1865. He was the notary of the Merchants National Bank of New York for a long time.

In 1866, Hinsdale was elected to the New York State Assembly as a Republican, representing the Kings County 2nd District. He served in the Assembly in 1867.

In 1850, Hinsdale married author Grace Webster Haddock, daughter of Charles Brickett Haddock and great-niece of Daniel Webster. Their children were Guy, Theodora, Frank, and Grace. He was Congregationalist.

Hinsdale died at his summer home in Marlboro from Bright's disease on August 19, 1880. He was buried in Green-Wood Cemetery.

New York State Assembly
Preceded by William D. Veeder	New York State Assembly; Kings County, 2nd District; 1867	Succeeded by William S. Andrews
