= 1862 New Hampshire gubernatorial election =

- March 11, 1862
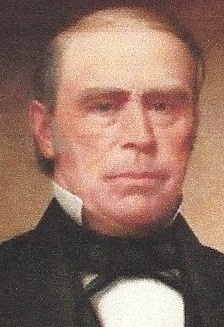

Nominee	Nathaniel S. Berry	George Stark
Party	Republican	Democratic
Popular vote	32,150	28,566
Percentage	51.46%	45.73%
- County results Berry: 40–50% 50–60% 60–70% Stark: 50–60%
Governor before election
Nathaniel S. Berry
Republican
Elected Governor
Nathaniel S. Berry
Republican

The 1862 New Hampshire gubernatorial election was held on March 11, 1862.

Incumbent Republican Governor Nathaniel S. Berry defeated Democratic nominee George Stark in a re-match of the previous year's election.

== General election ==
=== Candidates ===
- Nathaniel S. Berry, Republican, incumbent Governor
- George Stark, Democratic, civil engineer, brigadier-general of the third brigade of New Hampshire militia, Democratic nominee for Governor in 1861
- Paul J. Wheeler, Union Democrat, incumbent member of the New Hampshire House of Representatives

=== Results ===
1862 New Hampshire gubernatorial election
Party	Candidate	Votes	%	±%
Republican	Nathaniel S. Berry (incumbent)	32,150	51.46%	
Democratic	George Stark	28,566	45.73%	
War Democratic	Paul J. Wheeler	1,709	2.74%	
Scattering		45	0.07%	
Majority		3,584	5.73%	
Turnout		62,470		
Republican hold		Swing		
