= 1858 New Hampshire gubernatorial election =

- March 9, 1858
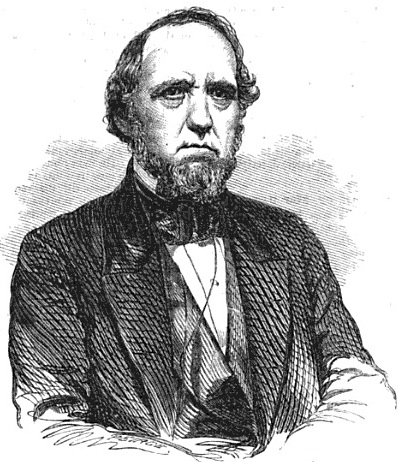

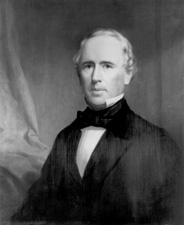
Nominee	William Haile	John S. Wells
Party	Republican	Democratic
Popular vote	36,305	31,577
Percentage	53.43%	46.47%
- County results Haile: 50–60% 60–70% Wells: 50–60%
Governor before election
William Haile
Republican
Elected Governor
William Haile
Republican

The 1858 New Hampshire gubernatorial election was held on March 9, 1858, in order to elect the governor of New Hampshire. Incumbent Republican governor William Haile won re-election against Democratic nominee and former United States senator from New Hampshire John S. Wells in a rematch of the previous election.

== General election ==
On election day, March 9, 1858, incumbent Republican governor William Haile won re-election by a margin of 4,728 votes against his opponent Democratic nominee John S. Wells, thereby retaining Republican control over the office of governor. Haile was sworn in for his second term on June 2, 1858.

=== Results ===
New Hampshire gubernatorial election, 1858
Party	Candidate	Votes	%
Republican	William Haile (incumbent)	36,305	53.43
Democratic	John S. Wells	31,577	46.47
	Scattering	72	0.10
Total votes		67,954	100.00
Republican hold			
