= Ralph Metcalf (New Hampshire politician) =

American politician (1798–1858)

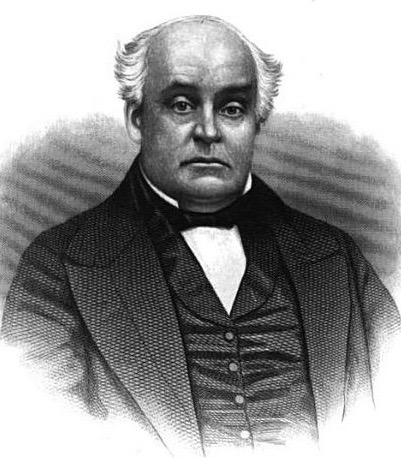

25th Governor of New Hampshire
- In office June 7, 1855 – June 4, 1857
- Preceded by: Nathaniel B. Baker
- Succeeded by: William Haile

Member of the New Hampshire House of Representatives
- In office 1852–1853

Personal details
- Born: November 21, 1796 Charlestown, New Hampshire, U.S.
- Died: August 26, 1858 (aged 61) Claremont, New Hampshire, U.S.
- Party: Democratic-Republican; Democratic; Know Nothing; Republican
- Spouse(s): Lucretia Ann Bingham; Martha Ann Gilmore
- Children: 2
- Education: Dartmouth College
- Profession: Attorney

Ralph Metcalf (November 21, 1796 – August 26, 1858) was an American lawyer and politician from New Hampshire who served as the 25th governor of New Hampshire from 1855 to 1857.

== Early life ==
Ralph Metcalf was born in Charlestown, New Hampshire on November 21, 1796. He was educated locally and worked on the farm of his father, a veteran of the American Revolution, until deciding on a career in the law in 1818.

Metcalf graduated from the academy in Chester, Vermont and then attended Dartmouth College, from which he graduated in 1823. He then studied law with Henry Hubbard and attorney Richard Bartlett of Concord, and was admitted to the bar in 1826.

== Career ==
He practiced law in New Hampshire, first with George B. Upham, and later with David Hale. From 1828 to 1830 he practiced in Binghamton, New York, after which he returned to New Hampshire to open an office in Claremont.

In 1831 Metcalf was elected secretary state. He held this post until 1838, when he moved to Washington, D.C. to accept a position in the Department of the Treasury while Levi Woodbury of New Hampshire was serving as Secretary. In 1840 he returned to New Hampshire and practiced law, first in Plymouth, and later in Newport.

In 1845 he was appointed Register of Probate for Sullivan County. In 1848 he was appointed a trustee of the state asylum for the insane, and he served several more non-consecutive terms. He served in the New Hampshire House of Representatives from 1852 to 1853. In 1853 he served on the state commission appointed to codify New Hampshire's statutes.

== Governor of New Hampshire ==
A member of the Democratic Party for most of his career, Metcalf later became recognized as anti-slavery and an opponent of Franklin Pierce's attempts to obtain passage of the Kansas–Nebraska Act.

As a result of Metcalf's opposition to slavery, in 1855 he was nominated for Governor by the Know Nothing movement, which increasingly incorporated anti-slavery sentiment into its core Nativism in New England states. This effort was promoted by Free Soil Democrats including John P. Hale, who hoped to create a movement that would send New Hampshire anti-slavery activists to the United States Senate and help build the nascent Republican Party. (It worked—Hale was elected to the Senate in 1855, eventually moving to the Republican Party because of his views on slavery. James Bell, an abolitionist Whig also won a Senate seat in 1855, and later became a Republican.)

Metcalf won the 1855 race for Governor, defeating incumbent Nathaniel B. Baker, James Bell and Asa Fowler. In 1856 he defeated John S. Wells and Ichabod Goodwin, but his margin over Wells was narrow, and the selection moved to the New Hampshire General Court, which chose Metcalf. Metcalf became identified with the Republican Party when it was founded as the major anti-slavery party in the mid 1850s. In addition to his abolitionist views, Metcalf's governorship was noteworthy for his support of a prohibition law, which passed in 1855, and remained in force until 1889.

He retired after the completion of his second term, and resided in Claremont. He died in Claremont on August 26, 1858.

== Family ==
In 1835 he married Lucretia Ann Bingham. She died a few weeks after giving birth in 1836, and the baby died soon afterwards. He married Martha Ann Gilmore in 1843, and they had two children: son Ralph (1844–1905); and daughter Frances Elizabeth (born 1845).

Party political offices
First	Know Nothing nominee for Governor of New Hampshire; 1855, 1856	Succeeded by None
Political offices
Preceded by Nathaniel B. Baker	Governor of New Hampshire; 1855–1857	Succeeded by William Haile
