= George W. Morrison =

American politician (1809–1888)

George Washington Morrison
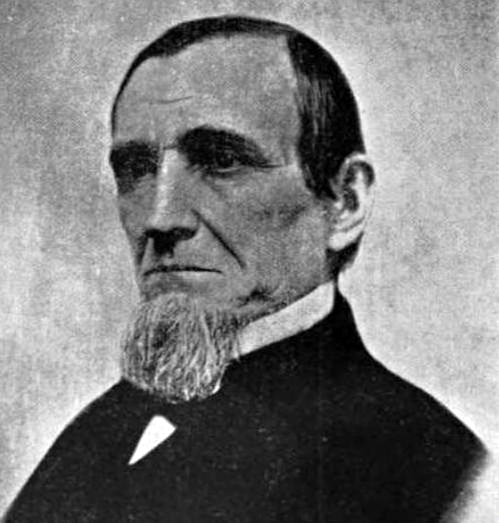

Member of the U.S. House of Representatives from New Hampshire
- In office March 4, 1853 – March 3, 1855
- Preceded by: Charles H. Peaslee
- Succeeded by: Mason Tappan
- Constituency: 2nd district
- In office October 8, 1850 – March 3, 1851
- Preceded by: James Wilson II
- Succeeded by: Jared Perkins
- Constituency: 3rd district

Member of the New Hampshire House of Representatives
- In office 1840–1841

Personal details
- Born: October 16, 1809 Fairlee, Vermont, U.S.
- Died: December 21, 1888 (aged 79) Manchester, New Hampshire, U.S.
- Party: Democratic

George Washington Morrison (October 16, 1809 – December 21, 1888) was a U.S. representative from New Hampshire.

Born in Fairlee, Vermont, Morrison attended the common schools and Thetford Academy. He engaged in teaching, then studied law, and was admitted to the bar in 1835, commencing practice in Manchester, New Hampshire in 1836. He served as member of the New Hampshire House of Representatives in 1840 and 1841. He served as solicitor of Hillsborough County, 1845-1849. He served in the New Hampshire Senate in 1849 and 1850.

Morrison was elected as a Democrat to the Thirty-first Congress to fill the vacancy caused by the resignation of James Wilson II and served from October 8, 1850, to March 3, 1851. He was an unsuccessful candidate for reelection in 1850 to the Thirty-second Congress, but he was elected to the Thirty-third Congress (March 4, 1853 – March 3, 1855). He was an unsuccessful candidate for reelection in 1854 to the Thirty-fourth Congress.

He continued the practice of law until 1872, when he retired. He died in Manchester, December 21, 1888, and was interred in Valley Cemetery.

U.S. House of Representatives
| Preceded by James Wilson II | U.S. Representative for the 3rd district of New Hampshire; October 8, 1850 – March 3, 1851 | Succeeded by Jared Perkins |
| Preceded by Charles H. Peaslee | U.S. Representative for the 2nd district of New Hampshire; March 4, 1853 – March 4, 1855 | Succeeded by Mason Tappan |
