= Grace Webster Hinsdale =

American author

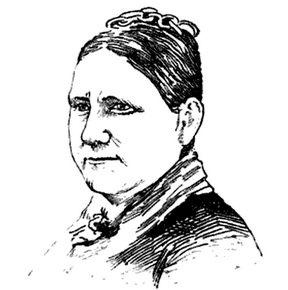
- Pictured in Upon Popular Hymns, 1893
- Born: Grace Webster Haddock; May 17, 1832; Hanover, New Hampshire, U.S.
- Died: August 31, 1902 (aged 70)
- Resting place: Green-Wood Cemetery, Brooklyn
- Occupation: author
- Spouse: Theodore Hinsdale (m. 1850–1880)
- Relatives: Charles Brickett Haddock, Ebenezer Webster, Daniel Webster
- Writing career
- Language: English
- Genres: religious themes, poems
- Notable works: Coming to the King, Thinking Aloud

Grace Webster Hinsdale (née, Haddock; May 17, 1832 – August 31, 1902) was an American author whose early development of a religious temperament prompted her most successful literary work. Both of her books, Coming to the King: a Book of Daily Devotions for Children and Thinking Aloud, were first published in 1865. She was a contributor for about 30 years to periodicals, principally verses, but also short sketches. Two of her books were republished in England.

== Early years and education ==
Grace Webster Haddock was born at Hanover, New Hampshire, May 17, 1832. (Note: According to Robinson, the date of birth is May 17, 1833.) She was the daughter of Rev. Prof. Charles Brickett Haddock, D.D. of Dartmouth College, and Susan Saunders (Lang) Haddock. Her mother was the daughter of Richard Lang, of Hanover, and her maternal great-grandfather was Col. Ebenezer Webster, also of New Hampshire, father of Daniel Webster. She was named for her aunt Grace (Fletcher) Webster, the wife of Daniel Webster.

Hinsdale spent her youth in her native town, and received a private education there. Early in life, she developed a religious temperament that prompted her most successful literary work.

== Career ==
On October 30, 1850, at the age of eighteen, she married Theodore Hinsdale (died 1880), a lawyer, of New York City, and a resident of Brooklyn, where they made their home. Her early writing were contributed to Hours at Home, a magazine, which afterwards became Scribner's Magazine, and she has also contributed verse and prose articles to a large number of periodicals, chiefly religious, including the Boston Congregationalist, Independent, Sunday School Times, and Christian Union.

In 1865, she published two books, Coming to the King: a Book of Daily Devotions for Children, and Thinking Aloud, both of which were republished by an English firm. Selections from her hymns, published first in Charles Seymour Robinson's and Dr. Richard Salter Storrs' Songs for the Sanctuary, and were copied in other hymn books. Several of her poems were in the collection, Christ in Song, compiled by Dr. Philip Schaff. Many works on hymnody contain notices of her work. In 1867, Hinsdale traveled abroad, gathering new inspirations.

Hinsdale was a frequent contributor of religious poetry to the periodical press. In 1872, Hinsdale composed a poem, “The Faithful Guard,” to be sung at the laying of the cornerstone of the 23rd Regiment Armory. Her poem on Raphael's Madonna dê San Sisto, in the Royal Gallery of Dresden, frequently copied, was written in Europe in 1867. Hinsdale read these verses in public, and also her poem, entitled, “The Old Cathedral.”

== Personal life ==
Hinsdale made her home at Mansion House, Brooklyn. Her children were: Charles (1851-1857), Grace (1854-1857, Theodore (1856-1857), Guy (b. 1858), Theodora (1860-1885), Frank (b. 1862), and Grace (b. 1874). Hinsdale died August 31, 1902, and was buried at Green-Wood Cemetery, Brooklyn.

== Reception ==
Her hymns were characterized by a depth of earnestness, a truly religious motive distinguishing them from much light literature or hymnody born within the end of the 20th century. The Brooklyn Eagle described her hymns as “characterized by a depth of earnestness, a truly religious motive distinguishing them from the light literature of "born within the last few years.”

== Selected works ==
- Coming to the King, 1865
- Thinking Aloud, 1865
