= Nathaniel B. Baker =

American politician

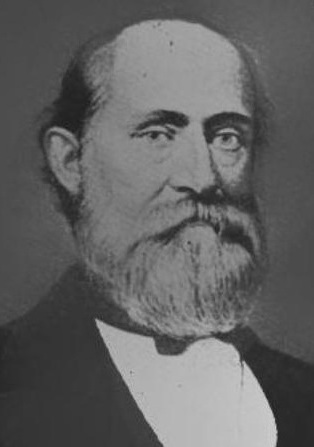

24th Governor of New Hampshire
- In office June 8, 1854 – June 7, 1855
- Preceded by: Noah Martin
- Succeeded by: Ralph Metcalf

Adjutant General of the Iowa Militia
- In office January 25, 1861 – September 11, 1876
- Preceded by: Jesse Bowen
- Succeeded by: John H. Looby

Member of the Iowa House of Representatives
- In office January 9, 1860 – January 12, 1862 Serving with George Washington Parker
- Preceded by: Benjamin F. Gue, Robert M. Scott, John W. Thompson
- Succeeded by: John Meyer
- Constituency: 28th district

Speaker of the New Hampshire House of Representatives
- In office June 5, 1850 – June 1, 1852
- Preceded by: Samuel H. Ayer
- Succeeded by: George W. Kittredge

Member of the New Hampshire House of Representatives
- In office June 5, 1850 – June 1, 1852 Serving with Ebenezer Symmmes (1850)
- Preceded by: George F. Sanborn
- Succeeded by: Nathaniel White
- Constituency: Concord

Personal details
- Born: September 29, 1818 Henniker, New Hampshire, U.S.
- Died: September 11, 1876 (aged 57) Des Moines, Iowa, U.S.
- Party: Democratic; Republican
- Spouse: Lucretia (Lucy) C. Ten Broeck (m. 1843)
- Children: 1
- Education: Harvard College
- Profession: Attorney; Newspaper publisher Militia officer

Nathaniel Bradley Baker (September 29, 1818 – September 11, 1876) was an American politician and military leader who served as the 24th governor of New Hampshire and adjutant general of the Iowa militia.

== Early life ==
Nathaniel B. Baker was born in Henniker, New Hampshire, on September 29, 1818, and raised in West Concord. Nathaniel Baker graduated from Phillips Exeter Academy in 1834 and Harvard College. He then studied law under Franklin Pierce, Asa Fowler and Charles H. Peaslee and passed the bar in 1842.

== Start of career ==
Baker was a co-owner of a Democratic newspaper, the New Hampshire Patriot. Originally a Democrat, he served as Clerk of the Merrimack County Court of Common Pleas in 1845. The following year he became Merrimack County Clerk.

Baker was also active in the New Hampshire Militia, serving as Quartermaster and later Adjutant of the 11th Regiment. He subsequently served as Aide-de-Camp to Governor John H. Steele with the rank of colonel.

In 1851, Baker assumed the position of Chief Fire Engineer for Concord's Fire Department. He also served in the New Hampshire House of Representatives from 1850 to 1852, and was elected Speaker of the House. In 1852 he was a Presidential Elector, and cast his ballot for Franklin Pierce and William R. King.

From 1854 to 1859 Baker was a trustee of Norwich University, and he received an honorary Master of Arts degree from Norwich in 1855.

== Governor of New Hampshire ==
In 1854 he was elected governor and served a single one-year term, June 6, 1854, to June 7, 1855. During his term the legislature failed to pass resolutions condemning the Missouri Compromise and the Kansas–Nebraska Act, evidence that New Hampshire was trending away from the Democratic Pierce and Baker and becoming increasingly antislavery. (In fact, after Baker left office, Republicans controlled the governorship for most of the next 100 years.) He was an unsuccessful candidate for reelection in 1855.

== Later career ==
After Baker's term as governor, he moved to Clinton, Iowa, where he continued to practice law. He was elected to the Iowa House of Representatives in 1859 as a Democrat. His increasingly antislavery views later caused him to join the Republican Party.

Baker's work as chairman of the Iowa House's Military Affairs Committee at the start of the American Civil War led to his appointment as adjutant general of the Iowa Militia, and he served until his death. By now a resident of Des Moines, during the war he was praised for his efforts to recruit, equip and train soldiers for front line regiments, and to keep track of their service records, including enlistments, promotions, wounds, deaths, and discharges. In addition, at the end of the war, Baker was credited with acquiring from returning Iowa units captured Confederate regimental flags and other memorabilia, and arranging to have it preserved.

== Death and burial ==
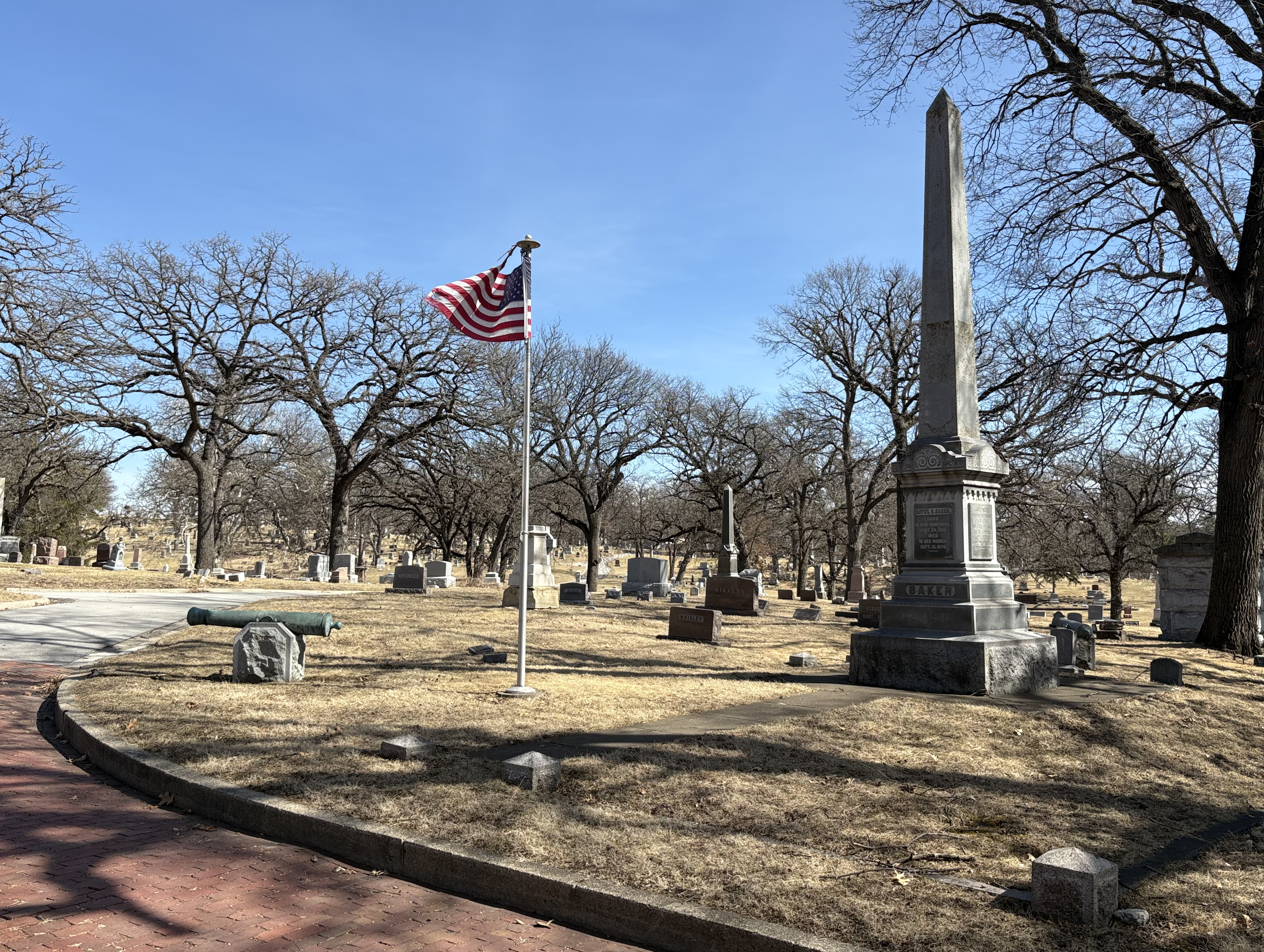
Baker's grave at Woodland Cemetery

In 1874 Baker took part in an effort to combat a massive grasshopper infestation in Northwestern Iowa, exposing himself out of doors in harsh weather including sleet, snow and high winds. His health began to decline as a result, and Baker died in Des Moines on September 11, 1876. He was buried at Woodland Cemetery in Des Moines.

Party political offices
Preceded by Noah Martin	Democratic nominee for Governor of New Hampshire; 1854, 1855	Succeeded by John S. Wells
Political offices
Preceded by Noah Martin	Governor of New Hampshire; 1854–1855	Succeeded by Ralph Metcalf
