= 1864 New Hampshire gubernatorial election =

- March 8, 1864
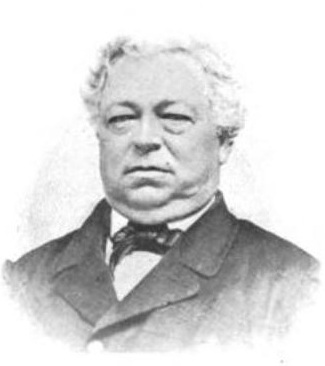

Nominee	Joseph A. Gilmore	Edward W. Harrington
Party	National Union	Democratic
Popular vote	37,006	31,340
Percentage	54.08%	45.80%
- County results Gilmore: 50–60% 60–70% Harrington: 50–60%
Governor before election
Joseph A. Gilmore
Republican
Elected Governor
Joseph A. Gilmore
National Union

The 1864 New Hampshire gubernatorial election was held on March 8, 1864.

The National Union incumbent Governor Joseph A. Gilmore defeated Democratic nominee Edward W. Harrington with 54.08% of the vote.

== General election ==
=== Candidates ===
- Joseph A. Gilmore, National Union, incumbent Governor
- Edward W. Harrington, Democratic, former mayor of Manchester

=== Results ===
1864 New Hampshire gubernatorial election (Note: Dubin gives Gilmore's total as 37,005. The result given is taken from the New Hampshire Senate Journal.)
Party	Candidate	Votes	%	±%
National Union	Joseph A. Gilmore (incumbent)	37,006	54.08%	
Democratic	Edward W. Harrington	31,340	45.80%	
Scattering		79	0.12%	
Majority		5,666	8.28%	
Turnout		68,425		
National Union gain from Republican		Swing		
