= 1861 New Hampshire gubernatorial election =

- March 12, 1861
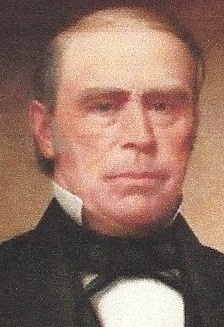

Nominee	Nathaniel S. Berry	George Stark
Party	Republican	Democratic
Popular vote	35,467	31,452
Percentage	52.82%	46.84%
- County results Berry: 50–60% 60–70% Stark: 50–60%
Governor before election
Ichabod Goodwin
Republican
Elected Governor
Nathaniel S. Berry
Republican

The 1861 New Hampshire gubernatorial election was held on March 12, 1861.

Incumbent Republican Governor Ichabod Goodwin did not stand for re-election.

Republican nominee Nathaniel S. Berry defeated Democratic nominee George Stark with 52.82% of the vote.

== General election ==
=== Candidates ===
- Nathaniel S. Berry, Republican, probate judge for Grafton County, Free Soil nominee for Governor from 1846 to 1850
- George Stark, Democratic, civil engineer, brigadier-general of the third brigade of New Hampshire militia
- Levi Bartlett, Constitutional Union Party (Note: Some 20th Century sources record Bartlett as an American Party candidate, but this party had largely disappeared by 1860.)

==== Withdrew ====
- Benning W. Jenness, Breckinridge Democrat, former U.S. Senator

=== Results ===
1861 New Hampshire gubernatorial election (Note: Most 20th Century sources give scattering votes as 24. The result given is taken from the New Hampshire Senate Journal.)
Party	Candidate	Votes	%	±%
Republican	Nathaniel S. Berry	35,467	52.82%	
Democratic	George Stark	31,452	46.84%	
Constitutional Union	Paul J. Wheeler	181	0.27%	
Scattering		42	0.06%	
Majority		4,015	5.98%	
Turnout		67,142		
Republican hold		Swing		
