= Joseph A. Gilmore =

American politician (1811–1867)

Joseph Albree Gilmore
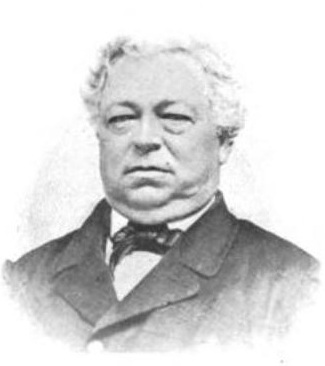

29th Governor of New Hampshire
- In office June 3, 1863 – June 8, 1865
- Preceded by: Nathaniel S. Berry
- Succeeded by: Frederick Smyth

President of the New Hampshire Senate
- In office 1859–1859

Member of the New Hampshire Senate
- In office 1858–1860

Personal details
- Born: June 10, 1811 Weston, Vermont, U.S.
- Died: April 17, 1867 (aged 55) Concord, New Hampshire, U.S.
- Party: Republican
- Spouse: Ann Page Whipple
- Children: 11
- Profession: Businessman, railroad executive

Joseph Albree Gilmore (June 10, 1811 – April 17, 1867) was an American railroad superintendent from Concord, New Hampshire, and the 29th governor of New Hampshire from 1863 to 1865.

== Biography ==
Joseph A. Gilmore was born in Weston, Vermont, on June 10, 1811. He was educated in Vermont, and moved to Boston to learn the mercantile business. Gilmore then moved to Concord, New Hampshire, where he established a wholesale grocery business.

Gilmore became involved with the Concord and Claremont Railroad, serving first as a construction agent, and later as the railroad's general superintendent. He also served as superintendent of the Manchester and Lawrence Railroad and the Portsmouth and Concord Railroad.

Originally a Whig, Gilmore joined the Republican when it was founded in the mid-1850s. He served in the New Hampshire State Senate from 1858 to 1860, and was the Senate's President pro Tempore in 1859.

Gilmore was elected governor in 1863 and reelected in 1864, and served from June 3, 1863, to June 8, 1865. Serving during the American Civil War. Gilmore's term was consumed by support for the Union, including a loan to provide bonuses and supplemental salary payments to soldiers, and arranging for the transport of soldiers traveling to New Hampshire on furlough and returning to the front lines.

== Death and burial ==
Gilmore died in Concord, New Hampshire, on April 17, 1867, and is buried at the Mount Auburn Cemetery in Cambridge, Massachusetts.

== Family ==
Gilmore was married to Ann Page Whipple, and they had eleven children.

Their daughter Ann was the first wife of Senator William E. Chandler.

Their son Joseph Henry Gilmore was a Newton Theological Seminary trained Baptist pastor, and wrote the words to the hymn "He Leadeth Me", inspired by the 23rd Psalm.

Party political offices
Preceded by Nathaniel S. Berry	Republican nominee for Governor of New Hampshire; 1863, 1864	Succeeded by Frederick Smyth
Political offices
Preceded by Nathaniel S. Berry	Governor of New Hampshire; 1863–1865	Succeeded by Frederick Smyth
Preceded by Austin F. Pike	President of the New Hampshire Senate; 1859	Succeeded by George S. Towle
