= 11th New Hampshire Infantry Regiment =

- Active: September 24, 1862 – June 4, 1865
- Country: United States of America
- Allegiance: New Hampshire & Union
- Type: Volunteer infantry
- Engagements: Battle of Fredericksburg; Siege of Vicksburg; Battle of Cedar Creek; Siege of Petersburg; Battle of the Wilderness; Battle of Spotsylvania Court House; Battle of Cold Harbor; Battle of the Crater; Battle of Boydton Plank Road; Battle of Hatcher's Run

Commanders
- Notable commanders: Walter Harriman

The 11th New Hampshire Infantry Regiment was a Union army infantry regiment that participated in the American Civil War. It was raised in the New England state of New Hampshire, serving from October 4, 1862, to June 4, 1865.

== History ==
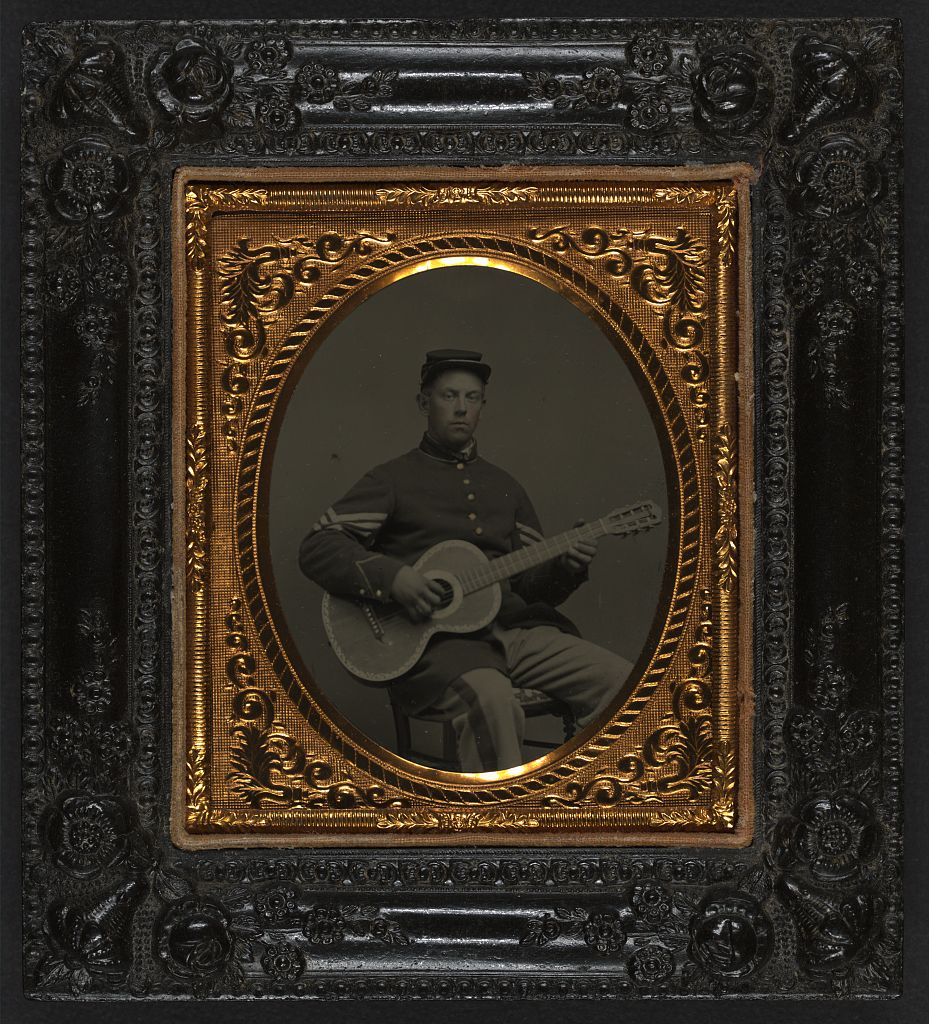
Sergeant Edwin Chamberlain of Company G, 11th New Hampshire

On September 2, 1862, the regiment was organized and mustered in at Concord, New Hampshire. Among its notable officers was Walter Harriman, a future Governor of New Hampshire.

From September 11 to 14, 1862, the 11th moved to Washington, D.C. It was attached to Briggs' Brigade, Casey's Division, Military District of Washington, until October 1862, and then to the 2nd Brigade, 2nd Division, 9th Army Corps, Army of the Potomac, until March 1863. From then, its assignments were:

- 2nd Brigade, 2nd Division, 9th Army Corps, Dept. of the Ohio, to June 1863.
- 2nd Brigade, 2nd Division, 9th Army Corps, Army of the Tennessee, to August 1863.
- 2nd Brigade, 2nd Division, 9th Army Corps, Dept. of the Ohio, to April 1864.
- 2nd Brigade, 2nd Division, 9th Army Corps, Army of the Potomac, to June 1865.

The regiment lost during its term of service 5 officers and 140 enlisted men killed and mortally wounded, and 1 officer and 151 enlisted men by disease, for a total of 297 fatalities.

== See also ==
- List of New Hampshire Civil War Units
