= Walter Harriman (politician) =

American minister and politician (1817-1884)

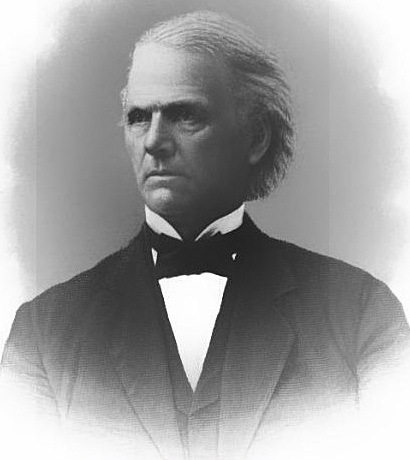
- Born: April 8, 1817; Warner, New Hampshire
- Died: July 25, 1884 (aged 67); Concord, New Hampshire
- Burial place: Pine Grove Cemetery, Warner, New Hampshire
- Military career
- Allegiance: United States of America; Union
- Branch: United States Army; Union Army
- Service years: 1862–1863; 1864–1865
- Rank: Colonel; Brevet Brigadier General
- Commands: 11th New Hampshire Infantry
- Conflicts: American Civil War
- Other work: Governor of New Hampshire

Walter Harriman (April 8, 1817 – July 25, 1884) was an American minister, merchant, soldier, and politician who served as the 31st governor of New Hampshire. He was a colonel in the Union Army during the American Civil War. On July 23, 1866, the United States Senate confirmed President Andrew Johnson's May 31, 1866, nomination of Harriman for appointment to the grade of brevet brigadier general of volunteers to rank from March 13, 1865.

== Early life and career ==
Harriman was born in Warner, New Hampshire, where he was raised and educated. He taught school at a number of academies in New Hampshire, Massachusetts, and New Jersey from 1835 through 1840. While teaching, he studied theology and in 1840 joined the Universalist Church. He later preached in Harvard, Massachusetts, and his native Warner.

In 1849, Harriman entered politics as a Democrat and was elected to the New Hampshire Senate, serving through 1850. The following year, he resigned as a minister and opened a store in Warner, partnering with John S. Pillsbury, a future governor of Minnesota and industrialist. In 1853, Harriman returned to politics and served as state treasurer until 1854 when he moved to Washington, D.C., to take the role as Clerk of the Pension Office, a patronage position which he held until 1856.

Harriman returned to New Hampshire and was elected to the state legislature in 1858. He was subsequently elected to the state senate, serving there from 1859 through 1861. Upon the completion of his term, he entered the newspaper business as an editor in Manchester, New Hampshire.

== Civil War ==
In 1862, Harriman was appointed colonel of the 11th New Hampshire, a newly raised three-years regiment of infantry. He led his regiment from Cincinnati, Ohio, across the rugged Cumberland Plateau of Kentucky and Tennessee to join Major General Ambrose Burnside's army in Knoxville, Tennessee. Harriman had no horse and walked with his men. During this 20-day journey, Harriman and his regiment camped for several days on the Emory River in Tennessee near the future location of the city of Harriman. (The directors of the company that later founded the city there decided to name it for him after having a conversation with an elderly man who fondly remembered Colonel Harriman and recalled the colonel saying that there should be a town near his regiment's campsite.)

He interrupted his military service, resigning on June 26, 1863, to run as a War Democrat in the 1863 New Hampshire gubernatorial campaign. He siphoned off enough regular Democratic votes to give the election to Republican candidate Joseph A. Gilmore. Harriman rejoined the 11th New Hampshire Infantry as colonel on January 26, 1864. He was captured by the Confederates in May 1864 at the Battle of the Wilderness during the Overland Campaign. He was exchanged September 12, 1864. He commanded Brigade, 2, Division 2, IX Corps (Union Army), Army of the Potomac from April 2, 1865, to April 22, 1865. He was mustered out of the volunteers on June 4, 1865. On May 31, 1866, President Andrew Johnson nominated Harriman for appointment to the grade of brevet brigadier general of volunteers, to rank from March 13, 1865, and the United States Senate confirmed the appointment on July 23, 1866.

== Postbellum career ==
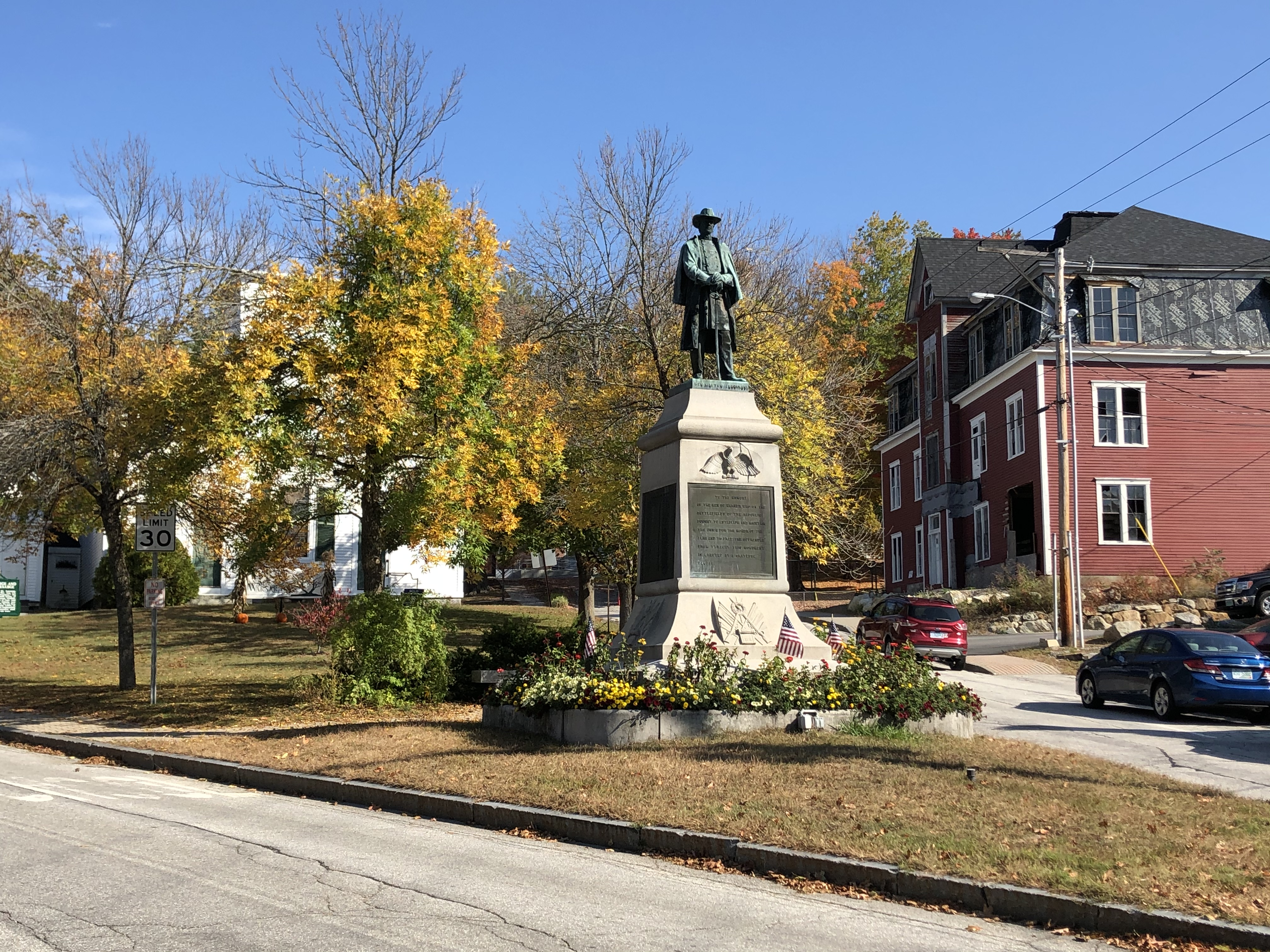
Statue honoring Harriman in the center of Warner, NH

Following the Civil War's conclusion in early 1865, Harriman joined the Republican Party and served as the New Hampshire Secretary of State until 1867, when he was elected as the state's governor. Harriman served two terms as Governor of New Hampshire from 1867 to 1869. Governor Harriman urged the public and the legislature to develop New Hampshire's agricultural, industrial and forest resources, in order to develop a post-war economy. He was very concerned with the education of post-war citizens of the state, and he signed an act creating teacher institutes. He personally drafted a law to get education out from under county commissioners, and he established an education fund with monies from the sale of state lands.

In retirement, Harriman served as Naval Officer for the Port of Boston until 1877. He published his History of Warner in 1879, and then traveled to Europe and the Far East from 1882 to 1883. He published Travels and Observations in the Far East in 1883.

Walter Harriman died July 25, 1884, in Concord, New Hampshire, and was buried in Pine Grove Cemetery in Warner, New Hampshire.

In the early 1890s Harriman's son, Walter C. Harriman, was one of the founders of the city of Harriman, Tennessee, which is named for Governor Harriman.

== See also ==
- List of American Civil War brevet generals (Union)

== Notes ==
Party political offices
First	Union Democratic nominee for Governor of New Hampshire; 1863	Last
Preceded by Frederick Smyth	Republican nominee for Governor of New Hampshire; 1867, 1868	Succeeded by Onslow Stearns
Political offices
Preceded by Frederick Smyth	Governor of New Hampshire; 1867–1869	Succeeded by Onslow Stearns
