= William Haile (New Hampshire politician) =

American politician (1807–1876)

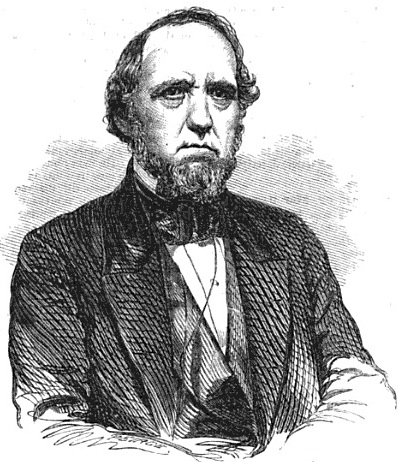

26th Governor of New Hampshire
- In office June 4, 1857 – June 2, 1859
- Preceded by: Ralph Metcalf
- Succeeded by: Ichabod Goodwin

Member of the New Hampshire House of Representatives
- In office 1846–1850; 1853; 1856

Member of the New Hampshire Senate
- In office 1854–1856

Personal details
- Born: May 1807 Putney, Vermont, U.S.
- Died: July 22, 1876 (aged 69) Keene, New Hampshire, U.S.
- Party: Republican
- Spouse: Sabrina Shaw Walker
- Profession: Merchant; Manufacturer

William Haile (May 1807 – July 22, 1876) was an American merchant, manufacturer and politician who served as the 26th governor of New Hampshire.

== Biography ==
Haile was born in Putney, Vermont in May 1807. He was educated in the local schools of Putney, and as a teenager he moved to Chesterfield, New Hampshire to work in a store and learn the mercantile business.

Haile's later operated his own store, which he later moved to Hinsdale, and he established Haile, Frost and Company, a business that produced flannel cloth and clothing items.

Originally a Democrat with nativist and antislavery views, Haile served in the New Hampshire House of Representatives from 1846 to 1850, and in 1853 and 1856. He was a member of the New Hampshire State Senate from 1854 to 1856, and was senate president in 1855.

Haile became a Republican when the party was founded in 1854, and was the party's successful nominee for governor in 1857. He was reelected in 1858, and served from June 4, 1857, to June 2, 1859.

In 1873 Haile moved to Keene, New Hampshire. He died in Keene on July 22, 1876, and was buried at Pine Grove Cemetery in Hinsdale.

His son, William H. Haile, served as Lieutenant Governor of Massachusetts from 1890 to 1893.

Party political offices
First	Republican nominee for Governor of New Hampshire; 1857, 1858	Succeeded by Ichabod Goodwin
Political offices
Preceded by Ralph Metcalf	Governor of New Hampshire; 1857–1859	Succeeded by Ichabod Goodwin
Preceded by J. Everett Sargent	President of the New Hampshire Senate; 1855–1855	Succeeded by Thomas J. Melvin
