= Jared Perkins =

American politician

Member of the U.S. House of Representatives from New Hampshire's 3rd district
- In office March 4, 1851 – March 3, 1853
- Preceded by: George W. Morrison
- Succeeded by: Harry Hibbard

Member of the New Hampshire Executive Council
- In office 1846–1848

Member of the New Hampshire House of Representatives
- In office 1850–1850

Personal details
- Born: January 5, 1793 Unity, New Hampshire, U.S.
- Died: October 15, 1854 (aged 61) Nashua, New Hampshire, U.S.
- Party: Whig

Jared Perkins (January 5, 1793 – October 15, 1854) was a United States representative from New Hampshire. He was born in Unity, New Hampshire in 1793, and attended the common schools of Unity and Claremont. He studied theology and was ordained as a minister in 1824, serving for thirty years.

Perkins served on the New Hampshire Executive Council 1846–1848. He also served in the New Hampshire House of Representatives in 1850. He was elected as a Whig to the Thirty-second Congress (March 4, 1851 – March 3, 1853) but was an unsuccessful candidate for reelection in 1852 to the Thirty-third Congress. After leaving Congress, he was nominated for Governor of New Hampshire in 1854 but died before the election. In addition, he was also appointed justice of the peace in 1854 and served until his death in Nashua in 1854. He was buried in West Unity Cemetery, Unity, New Hampshire.

== Sources ==
- United States Congress. "Jared Perkins (id: P000235)". Biographical Directory of the United States Congress.
- Jared Perkins at The Political Graveyard

Party political offices
| Preceded by John H. White | Free Soil nominee for Governor of New Hampshire; 1854 | Succeeded by Asa Fowler |
U.S. House of Representatives
| Preceded by George W. Morrison | U.S. Representative for the 3rd district of New Hampshire; March 4, 1851 – March 3, 1853 | Succeeded by Harry Hibbard |
