= Nathaniel S. Berry =

American politician (1796–1894)

Nathaniel Springer Berry
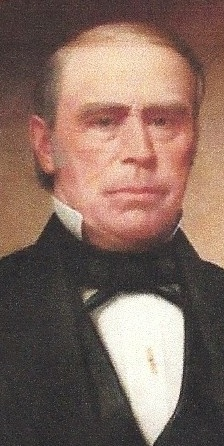

28th Governor of New Hampshire
- In office June 6, 1861 – June 3, 1863
- Preceded by: Ichabod Goodwin
- Succeeded by: Joseph A. Gilmore

Member of the New Hampshire House of Representatives
- In office 1828; 1833–1834

Member of the New Hampshire Senate
- In office 1835–1836

Personal details
- Born: September 1, 1796 Bath, Massachusetts, U.S. (now Bath, Maine)
- Died: April 27, 1894 (aged 97) Bristol, New Hampshire, U.S.
- Party: Democratic; Republican
- Spouse(s): Ruth Smith; Louise Farley
- Profession: Leather goods maker Legislator; Judge

Nathaniel Springer Berry (September 1, 1796 – April 27, 1894) served as the 28th governor of New Hampshire during the American Civil War.

== Early life ==
N. S. Berry was born on September 1, 1796, in Bath (in modern-day Maine, then a part of Massachusetts). His father died when Berry six years old, and after his mother's remarriage the family relocated to Bath, New Hampshire, where Berry attended the local schools.

At age 16 Berry became an apprentice in a leather goods manufacturing factory, where he learned the tanning, currier and saddle making trades.

== Start of career ==
After completing his apprenticeship at age 21, Berry relocated to Bristol, New Hampshire, where he purchased a tannery.

In the 1820s and 1830s Berry was active in the New Hampshire Militia. He received a commission as a second lieutenant in the 34th Regiment, and advanced through the ranks to become regimental commander with the rank of colonel.

Berry later relocated to Hebron, New Hampshire, where he continued to operate a successful leather goods business until it was destroyed in an 1857 fire.

A Democrat, Berry served in the New Hampshire House of Representatives in 1828, 1833, and 1834. He served in the New Hampshire State Senate in 1835 and 1836. Berry was also a delegate to the 1840 Democratic National Convention.

Unhappy with the Democratic Party's support for slavery, and also interested in other reform movements including temperance, Berry became involved in the movement which led to the creation of the Free Soil Party. He ran unsuccessfully for Governor as a Free Soil Democratic candidate in every annual election from 1846 to 1850, enabling the election of Whig nominee Anthony Colby by splitting the Democratic vote in 1846. In some elections Berry's candidacy prevented the "regular" Democratic nominee from receiving the majority of the popular vote required by New Hampshire's constitution, and the state legislature had to choose the winner.

Berry served as a Judge of the Grafton County Court of Common Pleas from June 1841 to June 1850. He was a Judge of Grafton County's Probate Court from 1856 to 1861. He became a Republican when the party was created in the mid-1850s.

== Governorship ==
In March 1861 Berry was the successful Republican nominee for Governor. He was reelected in March 1862, and served from June 1861 to June 1863.

Serving during the American Civil War, Berry was a strong supporter of the Union. During his governorship New Hampshire provided to the Union Army fifteen infantry regiments, three companies of sharpshooters, four companies of cavalry and one company of heavy artillery.

In June 1862, Abraham Lincoln desired to issue a call for more recruits to join the Union Army, but hesitated because he wanted to demonstrate that the war effort still had popular support, following a perceived ebb in Union state morale as the result of several battlefield reverses. Berry was one of the organizers of an effort to send Lincoln a letter from the state governors to inform him that the states would respond positively if he issued a call for additional troops. Now able to demonstrate popular support for continuing the war effort, Lincoln requested the states to provide additional soldiers.

Berry was also an active participant in the September 1862 War Governors' Conference. During this meeting Union state governors indicated their continued support for Lincoln's wartime policies, including the Emancipation Proclamation Lincoln indicated he intended to issue at an opportune moment.

== Later life ==
Berry did not run for reelection in 1863. He resided first with his wife's family in Andover, Massachusetts, and later with his daughter in Milwaukee, Wisconsin. He later returned to Hebron, where he lived until moving to Bristol in 1888 to reside with his son.

== Death and burial ==
Berry died in Bristol on April 27, 1894, at age 97. He was buried at Homeland Cemetery in Bristol.

== See also ==
- New Hampshire Historical Marker No. 223: Home Site of Nathaniel Berry Governor, 1861–1863

Party political offices
First	Free Soil nominee for Governor of New Hampshire; 1846, 1847	Vacant Title next held by Himself
Preceded by Anthony Colby	Whig nominee for Governor of New Hampshire; 1848	Succeeded by Levi Chamberlain
Vacant Title last held by Himself	Free Soil nominee for Governor of New Hampshire; 1849, 1850	Succeeded by John Atwood
Preceded by Ichabod Goodwin	Republican nominee for Governor of New Hampshire; 1861, 1862	Succeeded by Joseph A. Gilmore
Political offices
Preceded by Ichabod Goodwin	Governor of New Hampshire; 1861–1863	Succeeded by Joseph A. Gilmore
Honorary titles
Preceded by Hiland Hall	Oldest living United States governor (excludes pre-statehood); December 18, 1885 – April 27, 1894	Succeeded by Alpheus Felch
Preceded by Hiland Hall	Oldest living United States governor (includes pre-statehood); December 18, 1885 – April 27, 1894	Succeeded by Pío Pico
Preceded by Joshua Hall	Oldest United States governor ever November 5, 1890 – February 1, 1937	Succeeded by Roswell K. Colcord
