= James Bell (New Hampshire politician) =

American politician

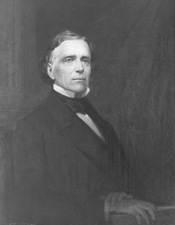

United States Senator from New Hampshire
- In office July 30, 1855 – May 26, 1857
- Preceded by: John S. Wells
- Succeeded by: Daniel Clark

Member of the New Hampshire House of Representatives
- In office 1846–1850

Personal details
- Born: November 13, 1804 Francestown, New Hampshire, U.S.
- Died: May 26, 1857 (aged 52) Laconia, New Hampshire, U.S.
- Party: Whig; Oppositionist; Republican
- Spouse: Judith A. Upham Bell
- Children: Mary A. Bell White; Eliza U. Bell; Lucy Bell; James Dana Bell; Charles Upham Bell
- Education: Bowdoin College; Litchfield Law School
- Profession: Politician; Lawyer

James Bell (November 13, 1804 – May 26, 1857) was an American politician and a United States senator from New Hampshire from 1855 until his death in 1857.

== Early life ==
Born in Francestown, New Hampshire, Bell graduated from Bowdoin College in 1822, studied law at Litchfield Law School, and was admitted to the bar in 1825 and began practice in Gilmanton, New Hampshire.

== Career ==
From 1831 to 1846 Bell practiced in Exeter, and was a member of the New Hampshire House of Representatives from 1846 to 1850. He was a delegate to the State constitutional convention in 1850, and ran unsuccessfully for Governor of New Hampshire in 1854 and 1855.

Elected as a Republican in July 1855, replacing John S. Wells, who had been appointed following the death of Moses Norris, Jr. Bell served in the United States Senate during the Thirty-fourth United States Congress from July 30, 1855 until his death in 1857.

== Death and legacy ==
Bell died in Laconia, New Hampshire on May 26, 1857 (age 52 years, 194 days). He is interred at the Exeter Cemetery in Exeter, New Hampshire. There is a cenotaph in his honor at the Congressional Cemetery, Washington, D.C.

== Family life ==
The son of Samuel Bell and Mehitable Dana Bell, he was the uncle of Samuel Newell Bell and the cousin of Charles Henry Bell. He married Judith A. Upham in 1831 and they had five children, Mary A. Bell White, Eliza U. Bell, Lucy Bell, James Dana Bell, and Charles Upham Bell.

== See also ==
- List of members of the United States Congress who died in office (1790–1899)

Party political offices
Preceded by Thomas E. Sawyer	Whig nominee for Governor of New Hampshire; 1853, 1854, 1855	Succeeded by Ichabod Goodwin
U.S. Senate
Preceded by John S. Wells	U.S. senator (Class 3) from New Hampshire; 1855 – 1857; Served alongside: John P. Hale	Succeeded by Daniel Clark
