= Charles H. Peaslee =

American politician (1804–1866)

Charles Hazen Peaslee
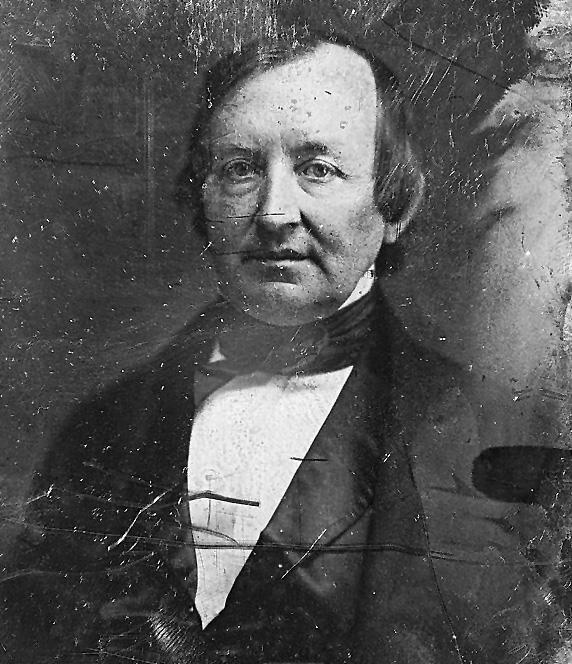

Collector of Customs for the Port of Boston
- In office 1853–1857
- Preceded by: Philip Greely Jr.
- Succeeded by: Arthur W. Austin

Member of the U.S. House of Representatives from New Hampshire's 2nd district
- In office March 4, 1847 – March 3, 1853
- Preceded by: District established
- Succeeded by: George W. Morrison

Member of the New Hampshire House of Representatives
- In office 1833–1837

Personal details
- Born: February 6, 1804 Gilmanton, New Hampshire
- Died: September 18, 1866 (aged 62) Saint Paul, Minnesota
- Party: Democratic

Charles Hazen Peaslee (February 6, 1804 – September 18, 1866) was an America politician who served as a U.S. representative from New Hampshire during the mid-19th century.

== Biography ==
Born in Gilmanton, New Hampshire, Peaslee attended Gilmanton Academy and was graduated from Dartmouth College, Hanover, in 1824. He studied law and was admitted to the bar in 1828, commencing practice in Concord. He served as member of the New Hampshire House of Representatives, 1833–1837, and as Adjutant General of the New Hampshire Militia, 1839–1847.

Peaslee was elected as a Democrat to the Thirtieth, Thirty-first, and Thirty-second Congresses (March 4, 1847 – March 3, 1853). He served as chairman of the Committee on Militia (Thirty-first and Thirty-second Congresses). He was not a candidate for renomination in 1852.

He served as collector of the port of Boston by appointment of President Franklin Pierce, 1853–1857. He moved to Portsmouth, New Hampshire, in 1860. He died while on a visit to Saint Paul, Minnesota, on September 18, 1866. He was interred in Harmony Grove Cemetery in Portsmouth.

U.S. House of Representatives
Preceded by At large	Member of the U.S. House of Representatives from New Hampshire's 2nd congressional district March 4, 1847 – March 3, 1853	Succeeded by George W. Morrison
