= Moses Norris Jr. =

American politician (1799–1855)

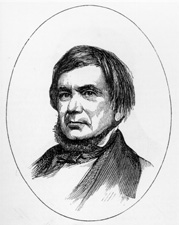

United States Senator from New Hampshire
- In office March 4, 1849 – January 11, 1855
- Preceded by: Charles G. Atherton
- Succeeded by: John S. Wells

Member of the U.S. House of Representatives from New Hampshire's at-large district
- In office March 4, 1843 – March 3, 1847
- Preceded by: Charles G. Atherton
- Succeeded by: District eliminated

Member of the New Hampshire House of Representatives
- In office 1837–1840; 1842; 1847–1848

Personal details
- Born: November 8, 1799 Pittsfield, New Hampshire
- Died: January 11, 1855 (aged 55) Washington, D.C.
- Party: Democratic
- Profession: Politician, Lawyer

Moses Norris Jr. (November 8, 1799 – January 11, 1855) was a United States representative and senator from New Hampshire.

Born in Pittsfield, he attended the public schools and the Pittsfield Academy, and graduated from Dartmouth College in 1828. He studied law, was admitted to the bar in 1832 and commenced practice in Barnstead. He returned to Pittsfield in 1834, was a member of the New Hampshire House of Representatives from 1837 to 1840 and in 1842, and was a member of the Executive Council of New Hampshire in 1841–1842.

Norris was elected as a Democrat to the Twenty-eighth and Twenty-ninth Congresses (March 4, 1843 – March 3, 1847). He was again a member of the State house of representatives in 1847–1848, and served as speaker. He was then elected to the U.S. Senate and served from March 4, 1849, until his death. While in the Senate, he was chairman of the Committee on Claims (Thirty-first Congress) and a member of the Committee on Patents and the Patent Office (Thirty-second Congress) and the Committee on the District of Columbia (Thirty-third Congress). He died in Washington, D.C., in 1855; interment was in Floral Park Cemetery, Pittsfield.

== See also ==
- List of members of the United States Congress who died in office (1790–1899)

U.S. House of Representatives
Preceded by Charles G. Atherton; Edmund Burke; Ira A. Eastman; John R. Reding; Tristram Shaw	Member of the U.S. House of Representatives from New Hampshire's at-large congressional district March 4, 1843 – March 3, 1847; Served alongside: Edmund Burke, John P. Hale, John R. Reding, James H. Johnson and Mace Moulton	Succeeded by (none)
U.S. Senate
Preceded by Charles G. Atherton	U.S. senator (Class 3) from New Hampshire; March 4, 1849 – January 11, 1855; Served alongside: John P. Hale, Charles G. Atherton and Jared W. Williams	Succeeded by John S. Wells
Political offices
Preceded by Harry Hibbard	Speaker of the New Hampshire House of Representatives; 1848	Succeeded by Samuel H. Ayer
