= Charles Brickett Haddock =

American politician (1796–1861)

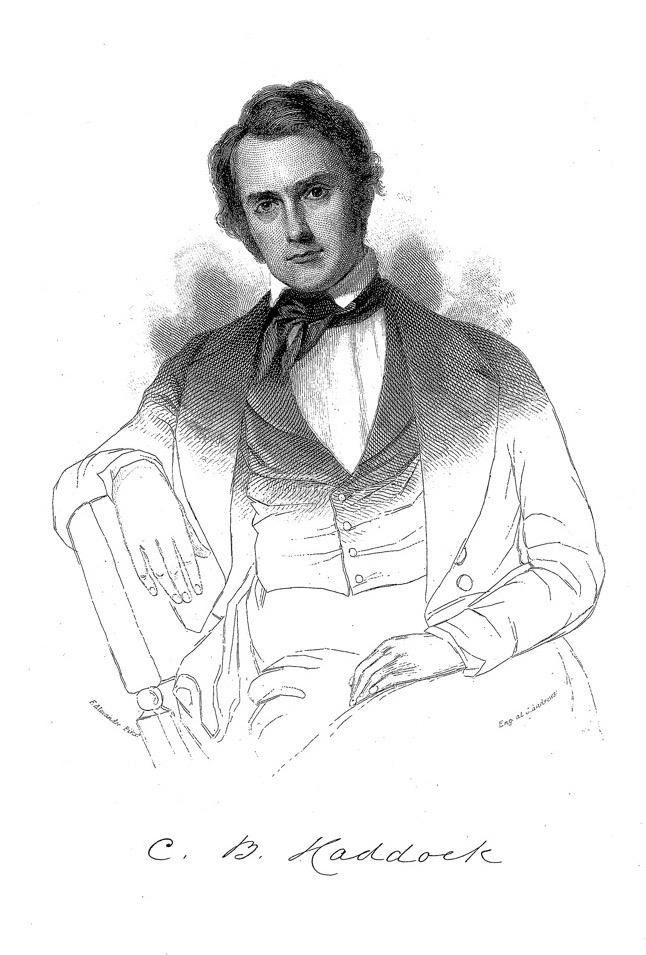
Charles Brickett Haddock

Charles Brickett Haddock (20 June 1796, Franklin, New Hampshire – 15 January 1861, West Lebanon, New Hampshire) was a New Hampshire educator, writer, politician and civil servant.

== Biography ==
Haddock's mother Abigail was a sister of Daniel Webster. Haddock graduated from Dartmouth College in 1816 and at Andover Seminary in 1819. He returned to Dartmouth, where he was professor of rhetoric and belles lettres from 1819 until 1838, when he became professor of intellectual philosophy and political economy until 1854. He was chargé d'affaires for the United States in Portugal from 1850 until 1854. Except for his time in Portugal, he served as a Congregationalist minister in Windsor, White River, Norwich, West Lebanon, and Quechee.

Thoroughly versed in public law, he represented Hanover for four years as a Whig in the New Hampshire legislature. There he introduced and carried the present common-school system of the state, and was the first school commissioner under that system. He was a promoter of railroad construction in New Hampshire.

He made anniversary orations, lectures, reports for fifteen years on education, sermons, and wrote on agriculture and rhetoric. He published a volume of addresses and other writings, including occasional sermons, in 1846, and was a contributor to the Bibliotheca Sacra, Biblical Repertory, and other periodicals.

Haddock married twice: on 19 August 1819 to Susan Saunders Lang (12 November 1796, Hanover, New Hampshire – 17 August 1840) in Hanover, New Hampshire, and on 21 July 1841 to Caroline Young Kimball (18 December 1807, Lebanon, New Hampshire – 7 March 1892, Hanover, New Hampshire) in Hanover. In the late 1820s Haddock was accused of committing adultery with Emeline Colby Webster, a relative of Daniel Webster, and Haddock was defended by his brother William Townsend Haddock, a nephew and former student of Webster. The writer, Grace Webster Haddock Hinsdale, was his daughter from his first marriage.
