= Asa Fowler =

American politician

- Born: February 23, 1811; Pembroke, New Hampshire
- Died: April 26, 1885 (aged 74); New Hampshire
- Education: Blanchard Academy, Pembroke; Dartmouth College
- Occupations: politician lawyer jurist
- Spouse: Mary Dole Cilley Knox (m. 1837)
- Children: 4 sons & 1 daughter
- Parents: Benjamin Fowler (father); Mehitable Ladd (mother)

Asa Fowler (February 23, 1811 – April 26, 1885) was a New Hampshire politician, lawyer and jurist. He served as a justice of the New Hampshire Supreme Court from August 1, 1855, until February 1, 1861, and in the New Hampshire House of Representatives 1845, 1847, 1848 and 1871 to 1872. In 1872 he was Speaker of the House. During all other years in the House, he served on the judiciary committee. He was nominated for governor of New Hampshire by the Free Soil Party in 1855.

He was born in Pembroke, New Hampshire, to Benjamin and Mehitable (Ladd) Fowler on February 23, 1811. From an early age, he was put to work on the family farm along with his ten siblings, but Asa contracted typhoid fever when he was fourteen and was thereafter unable to do anything other than light farm work. This proved to be a blessing in disguise because Asa was allowed to return to the education that he and his brothers and sisters had abandoned in order to work on the farm. After attending Blanchard Academy in Pembroke on a part-time basis (he still had to do light work on the farm), Asa was admitted as a sophomore to Dartmouth College where he was Phi Beta Kappa and graduated in 1833. After briefly working as a schoolmaster in Topsfield, Massachusetts, Fowler went to work for James Sullivan, Esq. in Pembroke where he began the study of law. In 1834, he moved to Concord, New Hampshire, where he continued to study law in the office of Charles H. Peaslee. At the same time, he worked as a freelance journalist and co-edited a literary gazette. In 1835, Fowler was elected clerk of the New Hampshire State Senate, which office he held for five years.

Admitted to the bar in February 1837, Fowler was in practice by himself until September 1838 when he formed a partnership with Franklin Pierce, the future president of the United States. This partnership continued until April 1845. Other legal colleagues included John Y. Mugridge from 1854 to 1855 and William E. Chandler from 1861 to 1864. Fowler retired from the practice of law in 1877.

He was a U.S. Commissioner for the State of New Hampshire from 1846 until his death; in February 1861, he was a delegate to the Peace Congress held in Washington, D.C., which sought in vain to prevent the American Civil War; and he was the solicitor of Merrimack County, New Hampshire, from 1861 to 1865. Following his departure from the last office, he served on a three-man commission charged with the revision of New Hampshire’s laws, and he shepherded through the legislature the resulting general statutes, which were approved in 1867. In his community, Fowler took a keen interest in public libraries and schools, and he served on the Board of Education in Concord.

Fowler also served as director of a railroad and two banks, additionally serving as president of the railroad and one of the banks. He is said to have resigned as president and director of the First National Bank when "he lost confidence in the cashier".

On July 13, 1837, Fowler married Mary Dole Cilley Knox (1815–1882). They had five children—four sons and a daughter—between 1842 and 1853. All five lived at least to adulthood.

From 1878 until his death, Fowler enjoyed extensive travel despite bouts of ill health and the deaths of his wife, a daughter-in-law, and grandson within less than two years. He spent the summer of 1878 in western Europe with his wife; daughter, Clara; and son, William. (His youngest son, Edward “Ned” Cilley Fowler, appears to have become estranged from the family.) After the death of his wife, he seems to have travelled alone, spending several months in Florida before returning to Europe for a last visit. In 1884, he travelled to California, visiting Santa Barbara, Monterey, and San Francisco. Asa Fowler died in San Rafael, California April 26, 1885. His embalmed body was shipped home and buried in New Hampshire on May 9, 1885.

Fowler’s religious affiliation was Unitarian, and he was active in that church. His political affiliations were, perhaps, emblematic of his times. His family of origin had belonged to the Democratic Party, but his opposition to slavery led him to abandon the party for nearly thirty years. From 1846 to 1856, he belonged to the Free Soil Party which was largely made up of ex-Democrats and was also called the Independent Democratic Party. Fowler ran for a seat in Congress from the second district of New Hampshire in 1851 on the Free Soil Party ticket but came in third in a three-way race. In 1856, he became a Republican and remained one until 1875, near the end of Reconstruction, when he once again became a Democrat.

Party political offices
Preceded by Jared Perkins	Free Soil nominee for Governor of New Hampshire; 1855	Succeeded by None
