= John S. Wells =

American politician

John Sullivan Wells
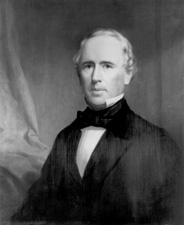

United States Senator from New Hampshire
- In office January 16, 1855 – March 3, 1855
- Appointed by: Nathaniel B. Baker
- Preceded by: Moses Norris, Jr.
- Succeeded by: James Bell

Personal details
- Born: October 18, 1803 Durham, New Hampshire, U.S.
- Died: August 1, 1860 (aged 56) Exeter, New Hampshire, U.S.
- Party: Democratic
- Profession: Politician, Lawyer

John Sullivan Wells (October 18, 1803 – August 1, 1860) was a United States senator from New Hampshire. Born in Durham, he attended Pembroke Academy, studied law, was admitted to the bar in 1828 and practiced in Guildhall, Vermont from 1828 to 1835. He moved to Lancaster, New Hampshire in 1836 and continued the practice of law until 1846. He was solicitor of Coos County from 1838 to 1847, and moved to Exeter, New Hampshire and resumed the practice of law.

Wells was a member of the New Hampshire House of Representatives from 1839 to 1841, serving as speaker in 1841. He was New Hampshire Attorney General in 1847, and a member and president of the New Hampshire Senate in 1851–1852. He was appointed to the U.S. Senate to fill the vacancy caused by the death of Moses Norris, Jr. and served from January 16 to March 3, 1855; he died in Exeter in 1860.

Party political offices
Preceded by Nathaniel B. Baker	Democratic nominee for Governor of New Hampshire; 1856, 1857, 1858	Succeeded by Asa P. Cate
U.S. Senate
Preceded by Moses Norris, Jr.	U.S. senator (Class 3) from New Hampshire; January 16, 1855 – March 3, 1855	Succeeded by James Bell
