= Ichabod Goodwin =

American politician (1794–1882)

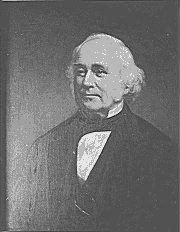

27th Governor of New Hampshire
- In office June 2, 1859 – June 6, 1861
- Preceded by: William Haile
- Succeeded by: Nathaniel S. Berry

Personal details
- Born: October 8, 1794 Berwick, Massachusetts, U.S. (known today as North Berwick, Maine)
- Died: July 4, 1882 (aged 87) Portsmouth, New Hampshire, U.S.
- Party: Republican

Ichabod Goodwin (October 8, 1794 – July 4, 1882) was the 27th governor of New Hampshire from 1859 to 1861.

== Life and career ==
Goodwin was born in 1794 in the community of Berwick, Massachusetts (which is today known as North Berwick, Maine). He became a merchant in Portsmouth, New Hampshire, working in the counting house of Samuel Lord, becoming master and part owner of several ships, and eventually the owner of two railroads, two banks, and a textile factory. In 1827 he married Sarah Parker Rice. Their daughter Susan married admiral George Dewey.

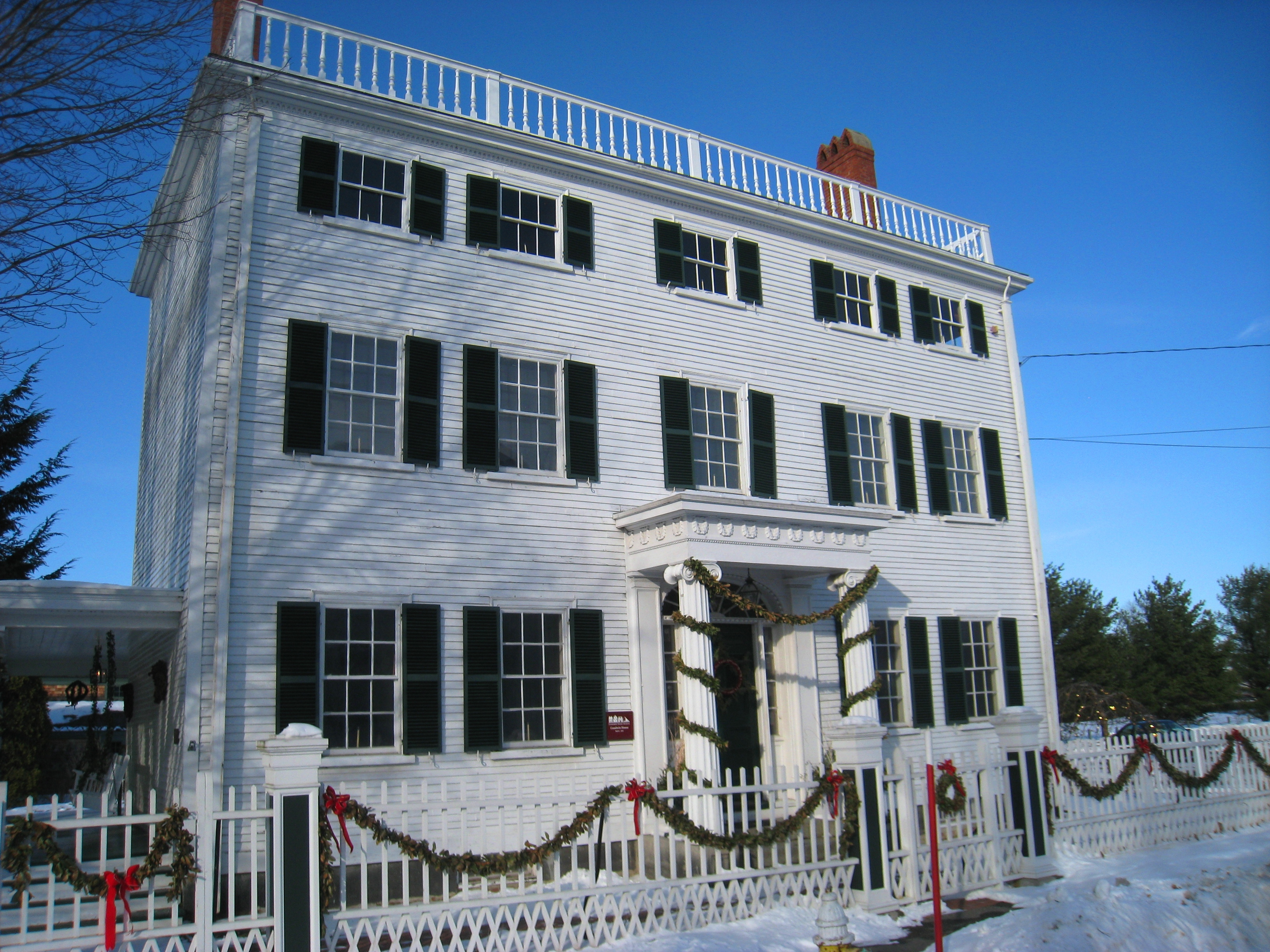
The Goodwin mansion has been preserved and is part of the Strawbery Banke Museum complex in Portsmouth, New Hampshire.

Goodwin was elected a State Representative, running as a Whig, in 1838, 1843, 1844, 1850, 1854, and 1856. In 1856 he ran, and lost, as the last Whig candidate for Governor of New Hampshire. He switched parties, becoming a Republican, and won his bid for governor in 1859, and again in 1860. He was a delegate at large from New Hampshire to the national conventions at which Henry Clay, Zachary Taylor, and Winfield Scott were nominated by the Whigs for the presidency, serving as vice-president of the first two bodies.

During his tenure, the New Hampshire legislature did away with the Courts of Common Pleas, transferring their duties to the State Supreme Court. Goodwin supported a legislative resolution opposing the extension of slavery, and an anti-immigrant act aimed at the defining of police courts' powers to suppress "intemperance." He also supported efforts to regulate railroads.

Goodwin's business interests were heavily interlinked with raw materials, such as cotton, produced by slaves in the Southern States and elsewhere.

In May 1861, as the Civil War began, Goodwin responded to the first calls for soldiers by borrowing funds against his own name to equip two regiments. The legislature affirmed the Governor's action when they came into session the following month.

He died in Portsmouth on July 4, 1882.

== Honors ==
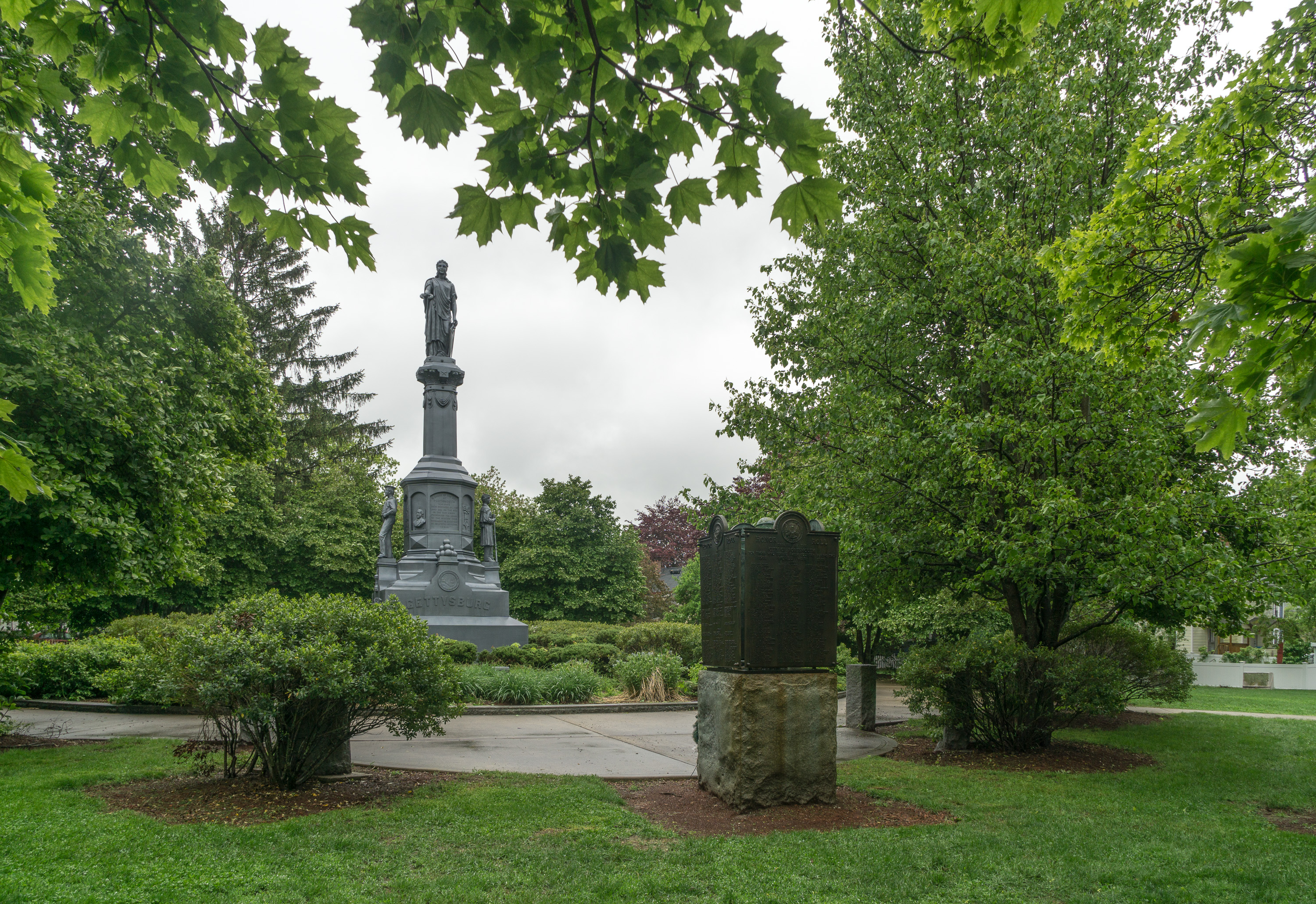
Goodwin Park

In 1888, a zinc monument to New Hampshire soldiers and sailors who served in the Civil War was dedicated in a new park. The park was named Goodwin Park in honor of Goodwin's service during the war. The park and statue were located across from the Goodwin family mansion on Islington Street.

In 1963 the Goodwin Mansion, facing demolition, was relocated from Islington Street to Strawbery Banke for preservation. In 1970 the house was formally deeded to Strawbery Banke by the State of New Hampshire.

== Archives and records ==
- Ichabod Goodwin business papers at Baker Library Special Collections, Harvard Business School.

Party political offices
Preceded by James Bell	Whig nominee for Governor of New Hampshire; 1856	Succeeded by None
Preceded by William Haile	Republican nominee for Governor of New Hampshire; 1859, 1860	Succeeded by Nathaniel S. Berry
Political offices
Preceded by William Haile	Governor of New Hampshire; 1859–1861	Succeeded by Nathaniel S. Berry
