= Thomas S. Stanfield =

American politician and judge (1816–1885)

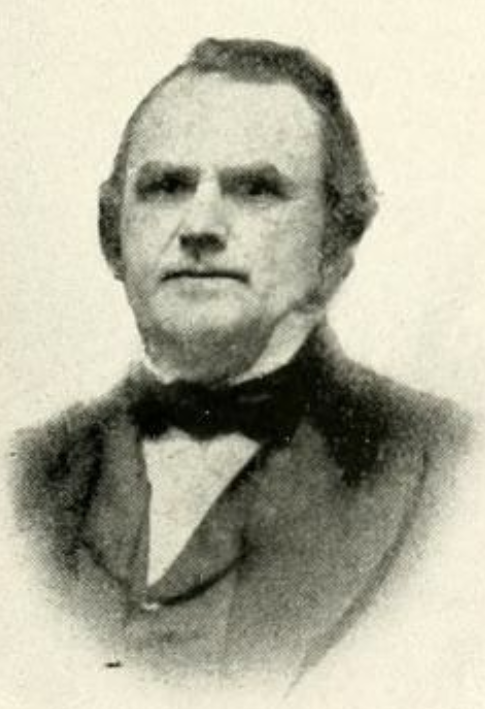
- Stanfield in 1901 publication

Member of the Indiana House of Representatives
- In office 1844, 1851, 1858

Personal details
- Born: Thomas Stilwell Stanfield; October 17, 1816 Logan County, Ohio, U.S.
- Died: September 12, 1885 (aged 68) South Bend, Indiana, U.S.
- Resting place: South Bend City Cemetery; South Bend, Indiana, U.S.
- Party: Whig; Republican
- Spouse: Nancy H. Peebles (m. 1841)
- Children: 4
- Occupation: Politician; judge; railroad executive

Thomas Stilwell Stanfield (October 17, 1816 – September 12, 1885) was a politician and judge from Indiana. He served in the Indiana House of Representatives in 1844, 1851 and 1858.

== Early life ==
Thomas Stilwell Stanfield was born on October 17, 1816, in Logan County, Ohio, to William Stanfield. In 1830, Stanfield and his family moved. They lived in Young's Prairie, Michigan in the winter of 1830. They moved to Harris Prairie in St. Joseph County, Indiana, and then to South Bend, in the spring of 1831. He attended school in South Bend and his teacher was Elisha Egbert. Stanfield worked at a saw mill on the bank of Wenger's Creek and then worked with his father brick making in northern South Bend. He worked as a clerk in the general store of L. M. Taylor. He then studied law in the office of Samuel C. Sample. In 1839–1840, Stanfield attended law school in Cincinnati, Ohio.

== Career ==
Stanfield was a Whig and then later became a Republican. In 1844, Stanfield served in the Indiana House of Representatives. In 1849, Stanfield was nominated as the Whig candidate for lieutenant governor of Indiana, but lost to James H. Lane. In 1851, Stanfield was elected again to the Indiana House of Representatives, defeating John Brownfield. In 1852, Stanfield was elected as judge of the circuit court. In 1858, Stanfield was elected again to the Indiana House of Representatives, defeating Sheriff S. L. Cottrell. In 1870, Stanfield was elected as judge again, defeating Judge Bradley. In 1873, Stanfield lost the election as judge to Judge Noyes. Stanfield served several terms in the South Bend City Council.

During the American Civil War, Stanfield helped organize troops and served as an adviser to Governor Oliver P. Morton. He was in charge of determining all available men for military service in St. Joseph County and took charge of Camp Rose in South Bend. He was offered the commission of colonel, but declined.

Stanfield was president and later director and attorney for the Grand Trunk Railroad Company. He helped purchase the right of way of the Lake Shore and Michigan Southern Railway from White Pigeon, Michigan, to Laporte, Indiana. He also served as the director for some years. Stanfield also worked for the Michigan Central Railroad and served as its director and attorney.

== Personal life ==
Stanfield was a Presbyterian. He was a friend of Edward Sorin and James Oliver.

Stanfield married Nancy H. Peebles of Chambersburg, Pennsylvania, in 1841. His wife died in 1896. He had two sons and two daughters, Edward P., Howard S., Mary C. and Mrs. Marion B. Staley.

Stanfield died on September 12, 1885, at his home at the corner of Washington and Lafayette Streets in South Bend. He was buried at South Bend City Cemetery.
