= Dinkel (surname) =

Dinkel is a surname. Notable people with the surname include:

- Emmy Dinkel-Keet (1908–2003), Dutch artist
- Nicholas Dinkel (1874–1919), American football player
- Tom Dinkel (born 1956), American football player
- William Francis Melchert-Dinkel (born 1962), American nurse
