= Dinkel =

Dinkel may refer to:

- Dinkel (river), in Germany and the Netherlands, tributary of the Vechte
- Dinkel wheat, a grain crop also known as spelt
- Dinkel (surname), includes a list of people with that surname
