= 99th Indiana Infantry Regiment =

99th Indiana Volunteer Infantry Regiment
- Flag of the United States, 1863-1865
- Active: August 21, 1862, to June 5, 1865
- Country: United States
- Allegiance: Union
- Branch: Infantry
- Engagements: Siege of Vicksburg; Battle of Missionary Ridge; Battle of Resaca; Battle of Dallas; Battle of Big Shanty; Battle of Kennesaw Mountain; Battle of Atlanta; Battle of Jonesborough; Battle of Bentonville

The 99th Indiana Volunteer Infantry Regiment was an infantry regiment that served in the Union Army during the American Civil War.

== Service ==
The 99th Indiana was mustered into Federal service at South Bend, Indiana, on August 21, 1862.

The regiment mustered out and its remaining recruits with the regiment were amalgamated with the 48th Indiana Volunteer Infantry on June 5, 1865.

== Strength and Casualties ==
The 99th Indiana originally mustered 900 men, and added 84 recruits over the course of the war. The regiment lost 178 men from death from all causes, Another 38 men of the 99th deserted, and two were missing in action.

== Colonels ==
- Alexander Fowler
- Josiah Farrar

== See also ==
- List of Indiana Civil War regiments
- Lucas, D. R. New History of the 99th Indiana Infantry. Rockford, 1900.
