= Norman Eddy =

American politician

Norman S. Eddy
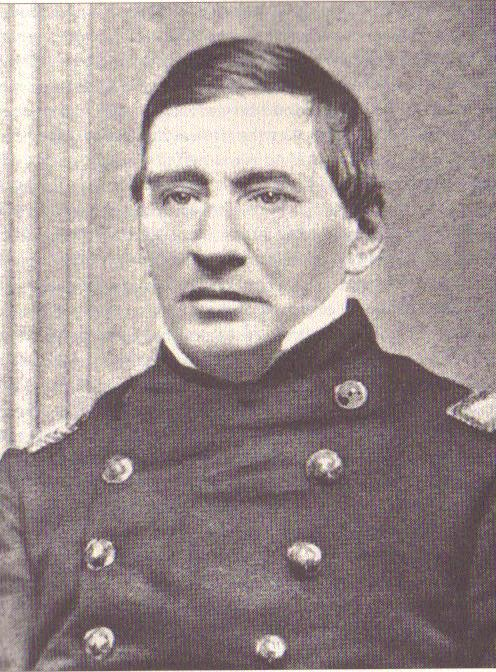
- Eddy during the Civil War

17th Secretary of State of Indiana
- In office January 16, 1870 – January 28, 1872
- Governor: Conrad Baker
- Preceded by: Max F. A. Hoffman
- Succeeded by: John Farquhar

United States Attorney for the territory of Minnesota
- In office 1855–1857
- President: Franklin Pierce

Member of the U.S. House of Representatives from Indiana's 9th district
- In office March 4, 1853 – March 3, 1855
- Preceded by: Graham N. Fitch
- Succeeded by: Schuyler Colfax

Member of the Indiana State Senate
- In office 1850–1853

Personal details
- Born: Norman Eddy; December 10, 1810 Scipio, New York, U.S.
- Died: January 28, 1872 (aged 61) Indianapolis, Indiana, U.S.
- Resting place: South Bend City Cemetery; South Bend, Indiana, U.S.
- Party: Democratic
- Spouse: Anna M. Melchior
- Children: 6
- Education: University of Pennsylvania (MD)
- Military career
- Allegiance: United States
- Branch: Union Army
- Rank: Colonel
- Unit: 48th Indiana Infantry
- Conflicts: American Civil War; Battle of Iuka (WIA); Battle of Grand Gulf; Battle of Corinth; Siege of Vicksburg

Norman S. Eddy (December 10, 1810 – January 28, 1872) was an American politician and military officer. He served as a member of the Indiana State Senate from 1850 to 1853 and a U.S. Representative of Indiana from 1853 to 1855. He then served as U.S. Attorney for the Territory of Minnesota from 1855 to 1861 and as Secretary of State of Indiana from 1870 to 1872.

== Early life ==
Norman S. Eddy was born on December 10, 1810, in Scipio, New York. He attended common schools. He graduated from Cazenovia Seminary. Eddy then sought admission into West Point, but was unsuccessful. He then studied law in the office of William H. Seward. He graduated from the University of Pennsylvania School of Medicine, studying under doctors Jackson and Robert Hare, earning an M.D. in 1835.

== Career ==
Eddy moved to Mishawaka, Indiana, after graduation in 1835. There, he practiced medicine until 1847, when he changed his focus to law and moved to South Bend, Indiana. He was admitted to the bar on April 1, 1847. In South Bend, he had a medical practice with Louis Humphreys for a time. He formed a law partnership with Joseph Jernegan. He tried to organize a cavalry during the Mexican–American War, but the government did not accept it.

His efforts shifted again three years later, when he commenced a political career in the Democratic Party with a post in the Indiana State Senate in 1850. After holding that position and several other local offices, he was elected to the 33rd Congress, upon the retirement of Graham N. Fitch. Eddy served only one term in this office, as he was defeated by Schuyler Colfax when he attempted to run for re-election. Undaunted, Eddy continued his political career as Attorney General of the Territory of Minnesota, serving as an appointee of President Franklin Pierce in 1855. He was offered the role of Minister to the Hague and the Netherlands by President James Buchanan, but he declined. Eddy was appointed commissioner for the sale of the Delaware trust lands in 1857.

The outbreak of the American Civil War marked a new phase of Eddy's life, as he organized the 48th Indiana Infantry and received a commission as its colonel. Eddy served in this capacity for two years, but received disabling wounds in Mississippi at the Battle of Iuka and left the service in July 1863. He also fought in the Battle of Grand Gulf, Battle of Corinth and the siege of Vicksburg. Despite the wounds, he was fortunate, as 119 of his 420 men were killed or wounded in the engagement after Eddy bivouacked his unit in directly front of an enemy artillery location.

After the close of his military career, Eddy resumed the practice of law. Eddy was Indiana's collector of internal revenue from 1865 to 1870, and then its Secretary of State of Indiana from 1870 to 1872.

== Personal life ==
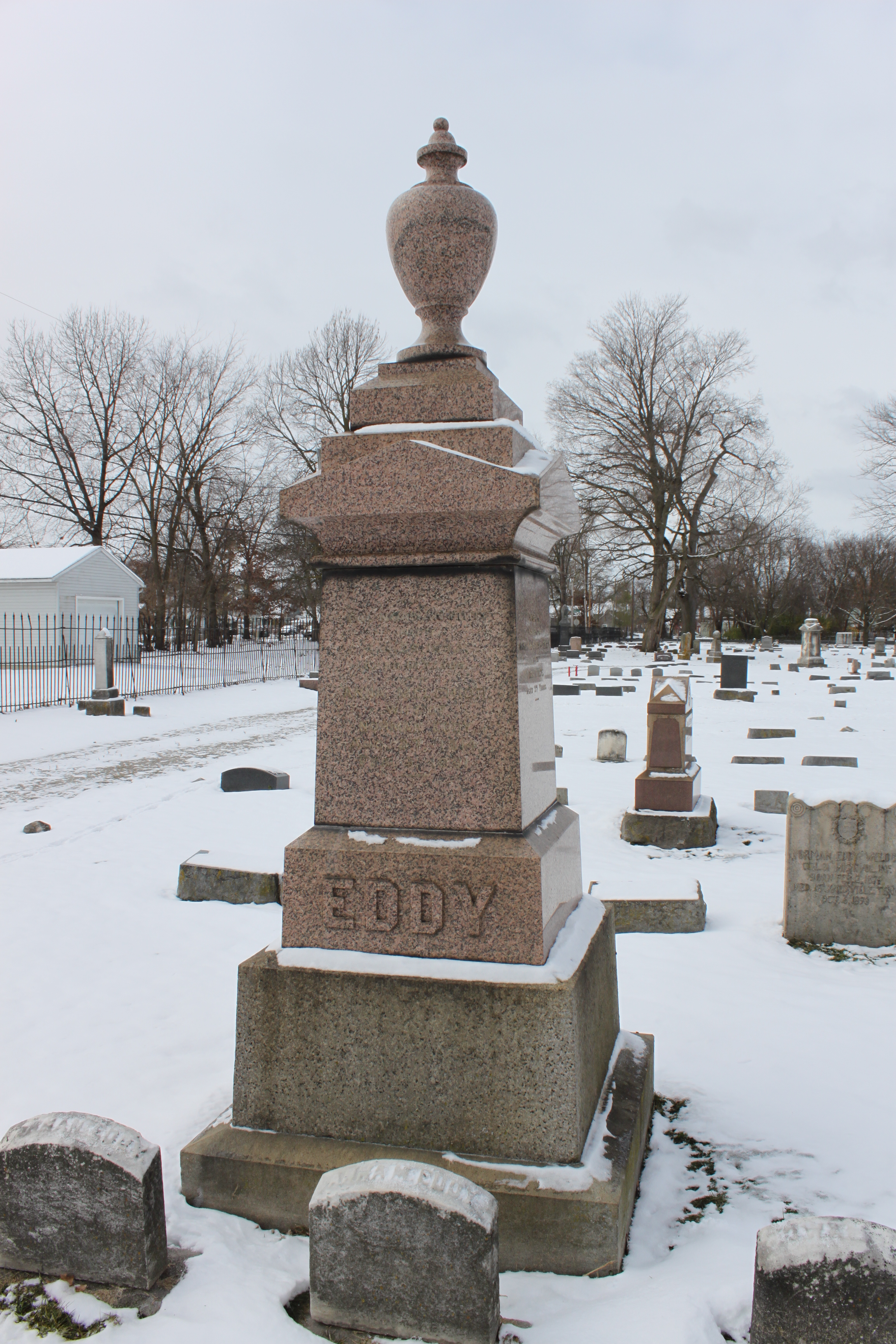
Grave of Eddy in South Bend City Cemetery

Around 1835, Eddy married Anna M. Melchior. They had six children.

Eddy died from a heart condition on January 28, 1872, at his home in Indianapolis. An Episcopalian, Eddy was buried in South Bend City Cemetery in South Bend.

U.S. House of Representatives
Preceded by Graham N. Fitch	Member of the U.S. House of Representatives from Indiana's 9th congressional district 1853–1855	Succeeded by Schuyler Colfax
Political offices
Preceded by Max F. A. Hoffman	Secretary of State of Indiana; 1871–1872	Succeeded by William W. Curry
