= Schuyler Colfax =

Vice President of the United States from 1869 to 1873

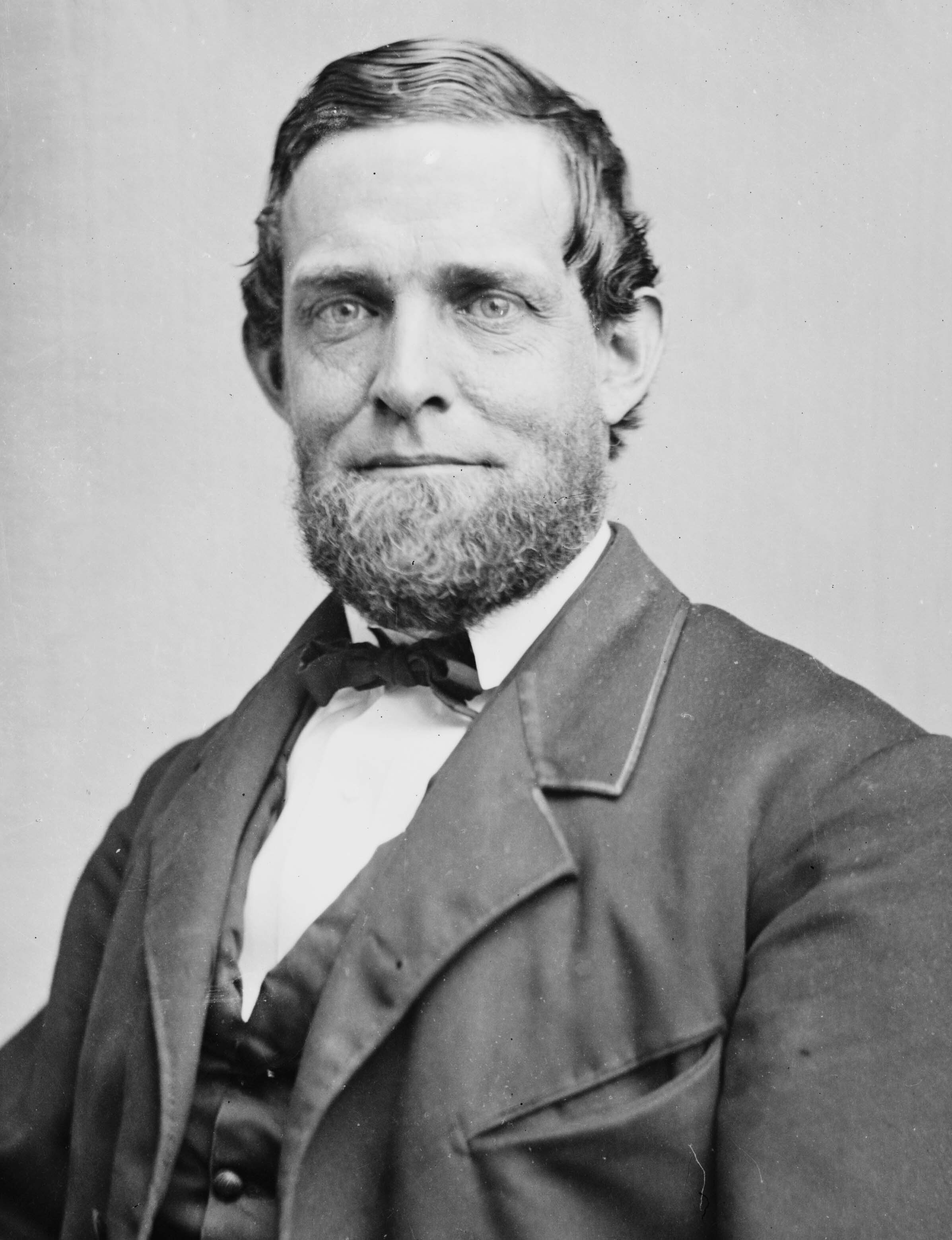
- Portrait by Mathew Brady, 1869

17th Vice President of the United States
- In office March 4, 1869 – March 4, 1873
- President: Ulysses S. Grant
- Preceded by: Andrew Johnson
- Succeeded by: Henry Wilson

25th Speaker of the United States House of Representatives
- In office December 7, 1863 – March 3, 1869
- Preceded by: Galusha A. Grow
- Succeeded by: Theodore M. Pomeroy

Leader of the House Republican Conference
- In office December 7, 1863 – March 3, 1869
- Preceded by: Galusha A. Grow
- Succeeded by: Theodore M. Pomeroy

Member of the U.S. House of Representatives from Indiana's 9th district
- In office March 4, 1855 – March 3, 1869
- Preceded by: Norman Eddy
- Succeeded by: John P. C. Shanks

Personal details
- Born: Schuyler Colfax Jr. March 23, 1823 New York City, U.S.
- Died: January 13, 1885 (aged 61) Mankato, Minnesota, U.S.
- Resting place: South Bend City Cemetery, South Bend, Indiana, U.S.
- Party: Whig (before 1854); Republican (after 1854)
- Other political affiliations: Indiana People's Party (1854)
- Spouses: Evelyn Clark (m. 1844; died 1863) Ellen Wade (m. 1868)
- Children: Schuyler Colfax III

Schuyler Colfax Jr. (/ˈskaɪlər ˈkoʊlfæks/ SKY-lər KOHL-fax; March 23, 1823 – January 13, 1885) was an American journalist, businessman, and politician who served as the 17th vice president of the United States from 1869 to 1873, and prior to that as the 25th Speaker of the United States House of Representatives from 1863 to 1869. Originally a Whig, then part of the short-lived People's Party of Indiana, and later a Republican, he was the U.S. representative for Indiana's 9th congressional district from 1855 to 1869.

Born in New York City, Colfax was known for his opposition to slavery while serving in Congress, and was a founder of the Republican Party. During his first term as speaker, he led the effort to pass the Thirteenth Amendment to the United States Constitution, which abolished slavery in the United States. When it came before the House for a final vote in January 1865, he emphasized his support by casting a vote in favor—by convention the speaker would vote only to break a tie. Chosen as Ulysses S. Grant's running mate in the 1868 election, the pair won easily over Democratic Party nominees Horatio Seymour and Francis Preston Blair Jr. As was typical during the 19th century, Colfax had little involvement in Grant's presidency. In addition to his duties as president of the U.S. Senate, he continued to lecture and write for the press while in office. Believing Grant would serve only one term, Colfax attempted unsuccessfully to garner support for the 1872 Republican presidential nomination by telling friends and supporters he would not seek a second vice presidential term. When Grant announced that he would run again, Colfax reversed himself and attempted to win the vice-presidential nomination, but it was won by Henry Wilson.

An 1872–1873 congressional investigation into the Crédit Mobilier scandal identified Colfax as one of several federal government officials who, in 1868, had accepted payments of cash and discounted stock from the Union Pacific Railroad in exchange for favorable action during the construction of the transcontinental railroad. Though he vociferously defended himself against charges, his reputation suffered. Colfax left the vice presidency at the end of his term in March 1873, and never again ran for office. Afterward, he worked as a business executive and became a popular lecturer and speechmaker.

Colfax suffered a heart attack and died at a railroad station in Mankato, Minnesota, on January 13, 1885, while traveling to a speaking engagement in Iowa. He is one of only two persons to have served as both speaker of the House and vice president, the other being John Nance Garner.

== Early life ==
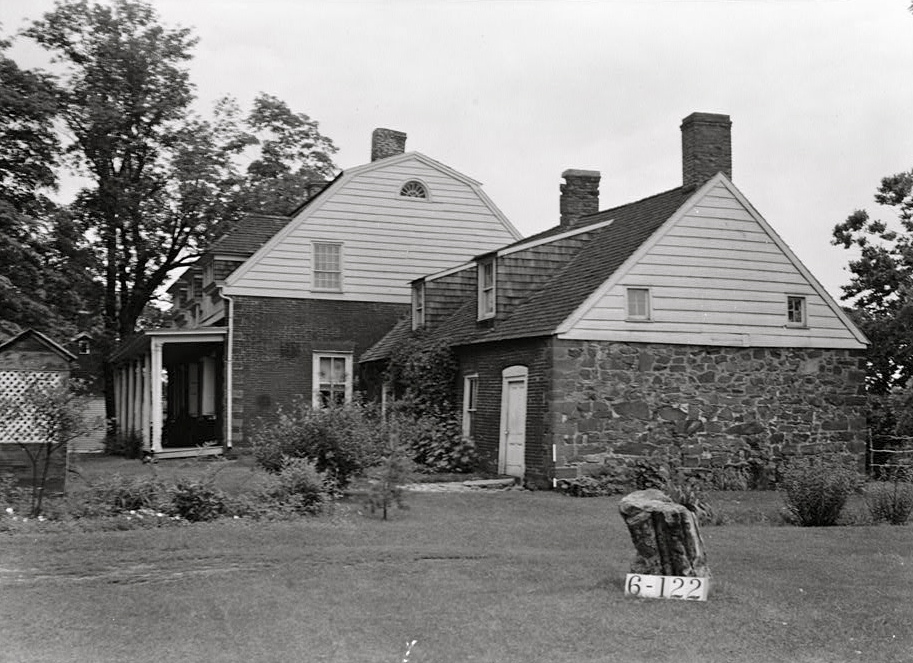
Schuyler–Colfax House, ancestral home of Schuyler Colfax's grandparents William and Hester. Originally built in 1695.

Schuyler Colfax Jr. was born in New York City on March 23, 1823, the son of Schuyler Colfax Sr. (1792–1822), a bank teller, and Hannah Stryker (1805–1872), both of English and Dutch ancestry, who had married on April 25, 1820. His grandfather, William Colfax, served in George Washington's Life Guard during the American Revolution and married Hester Schuyler, the second great-granddaughter of Philip Pieterse Schuyler. and a cousin of General Philip Schuyler. William Colfax became a general in the New Jersey Militia after the Revolution and commanded a brigade during the War of 1812.

Schuyler Colfax Sr. contracted tuberculosis and died on October 30, 1822, five months before Colfax was born. His sister Mary died in July 1823, four months after he was born. After the senior Colfax's death, Colfax's mother and grandmother ran a boarding house as their primary means of economic support. Colfax attended school in New York City until he was 10, when family financial difficulties caused him to end his formal education and take a job as a clerk in the store of George W. Matthews.

Colfax's mother married George Matthews in 1834, and the family moved to New Carlisle, Indiana, where Matthews ran a store that also served as the village post office. There, Colfax became an avid reader of newspapers and books. The family moved again, in 1841, to nearby South Bend, Indiana, after Matthews became St. Joseph County Auditor. He appointed Colfax as his deputy, a post that Colfax held throughout the eight years Matthews was in office.

== Newspaper editor ==
In 1842, Colfax became the editor of the pro-Whig South Bend Free Press, owned by John D. Defrees. When Defrees moved to Indianapolis the following year and purchased the Indiana Journal, he hired Colfax to cover the Indiana Senate for the Journal. In addition to covering the state senate, Colfax contributed articles on Indiana politics to the New York Tribune, leading to a friendship with its editor, Horace Greeley.

In 1845, Colfax purchased the South Bend Free Press and changed its name to the St. Joseph Valley Register. He owned the Register for nine years, at first in support of the Whigs, then shifting to the newly established Republican Party.

== Whig Party politician ==
While covering the Indiana Senate as a journalist, Colfax also served as the senate's assistant enrolling clerk from 1842 to 1844. In 1843, several South Bend residents formed a debating society in which members researched and discussed current events and other topics of interest, and Colfax became a prominent member. The organization's success led it to create a moot state legislature, in which members introduced, debated, and voted on bills in accordance with the rules of the Indiana General Assembly. As with the debating society, Colfax was a prominent member of South Bend's moot legislature.

Colfax's success in the debating society and moot legislature made him prominent enough to take part in politics, and he was selected as a delegate to the 1848 Whig National Convention, where he was selected as one of the gathering's secretaries and supported Zachary Taylor for the presidency. He was next elected as a delegate to Indiana's 1849–1850 state constitutional convention. Colfax was the 1851 Whig nominee for Congress in the district which included South Bend, but narrowly lost to his Democratic opponent, primarily because he voted against a measure at the constitutional convention that stopped free African Americans from moving to Indiana.

In 1852, Colfax was a delegate to the Whig National Convention and was selected to serve as a convention secretary. He supported Winfield Scott for president, and after Scott was nominated, Colfax took an active part in the campaign by making speeches and authoring and distributing newspaper articles and editorials. In 1852, Colfax's political supporters encouraged him to make a second run for the U.S. House, but he declined.

== U.S. House of Representatives (1855–1869) ==
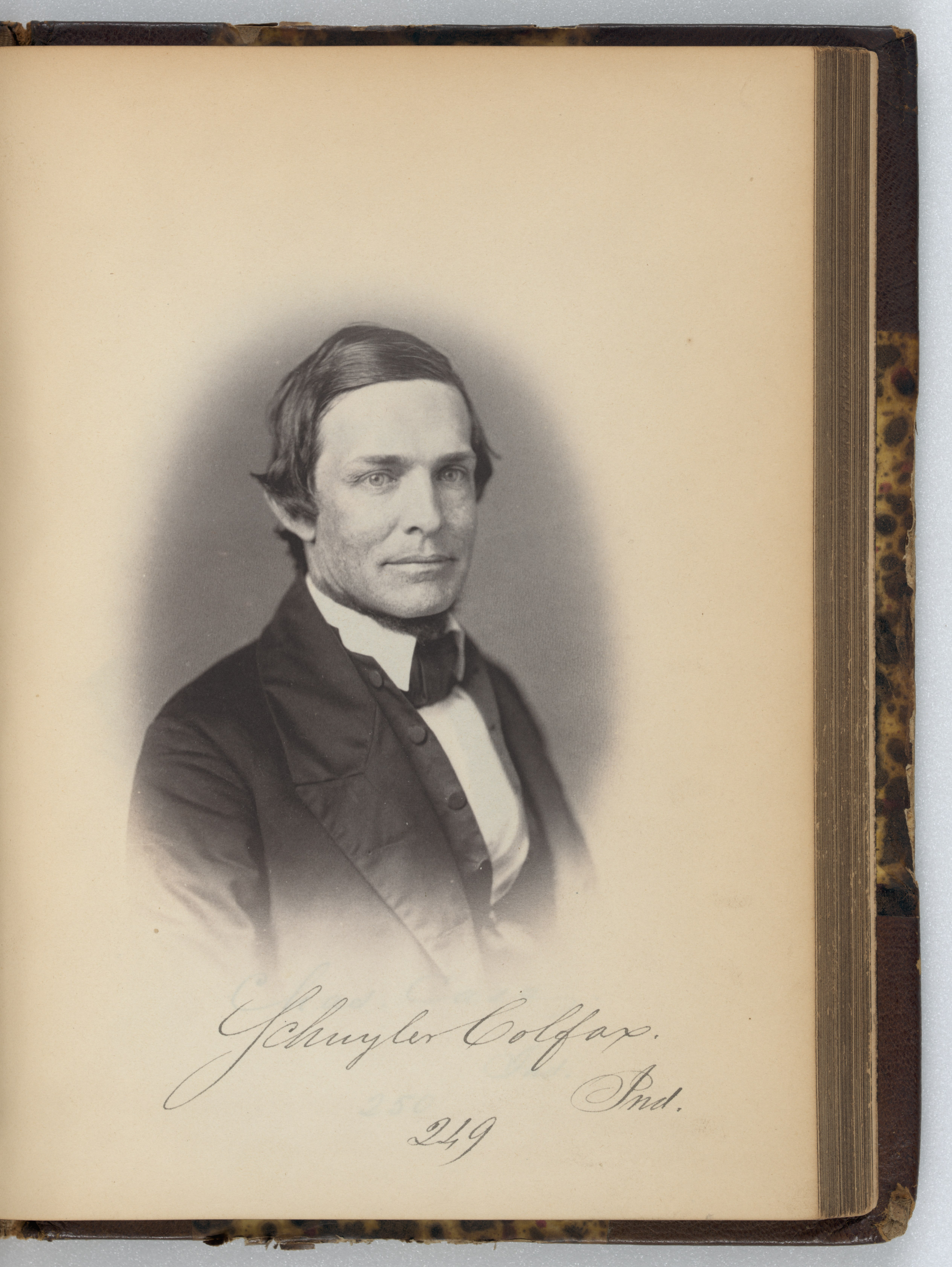
Congressman Colfax (Indiana) 1859

In 1854, Colfax ran for Congress again, this time as nominee of the short-lived Indiana People's Party, an anti-slavery movement which formed to oppose the Kansas–Nebraska Act. Colfax won and was reelected six times, representing Indiana's 9th congressional district from March 4, 1855, to March 3, 1869. During his House service, Colfax became a member of the leadership as chairman of the Committee on Post Office and Post Roads, a post he held from 1859 to 1863.

=== Know Nothing party affiliation ===
In 1855, Colfax considered joining the Know Nothing Party because of the antislavery plank in its platform. He was chosen as a delegate to the party's June convention without his knowledge. Colfax had mixed feelings about the party and later denied being a member. He agreed with many of its policies, though disapproved of its secrecy oath and citizenship test. By the time of his 1856 campaign for re-election, the new Republican Party had become the main anti-slavery party, and Colfax became an early member.

=== Opposition to slavery ===
Colfax was identified with the Radical Republicans in Congress and was an energetic opponent of slavery. His June 21, 1856, "Kansas Code" speech attacking laws passed by the proslavery Legislature in Kansas became the most widely requested Republican campaign document. Then, as the 1860 presidential election approached, Colfax traveled frequently, delivered many speeches, and helped bind the various Republican and antislavery factions together into a unified party that could win the presidency.

=== Civil War ===
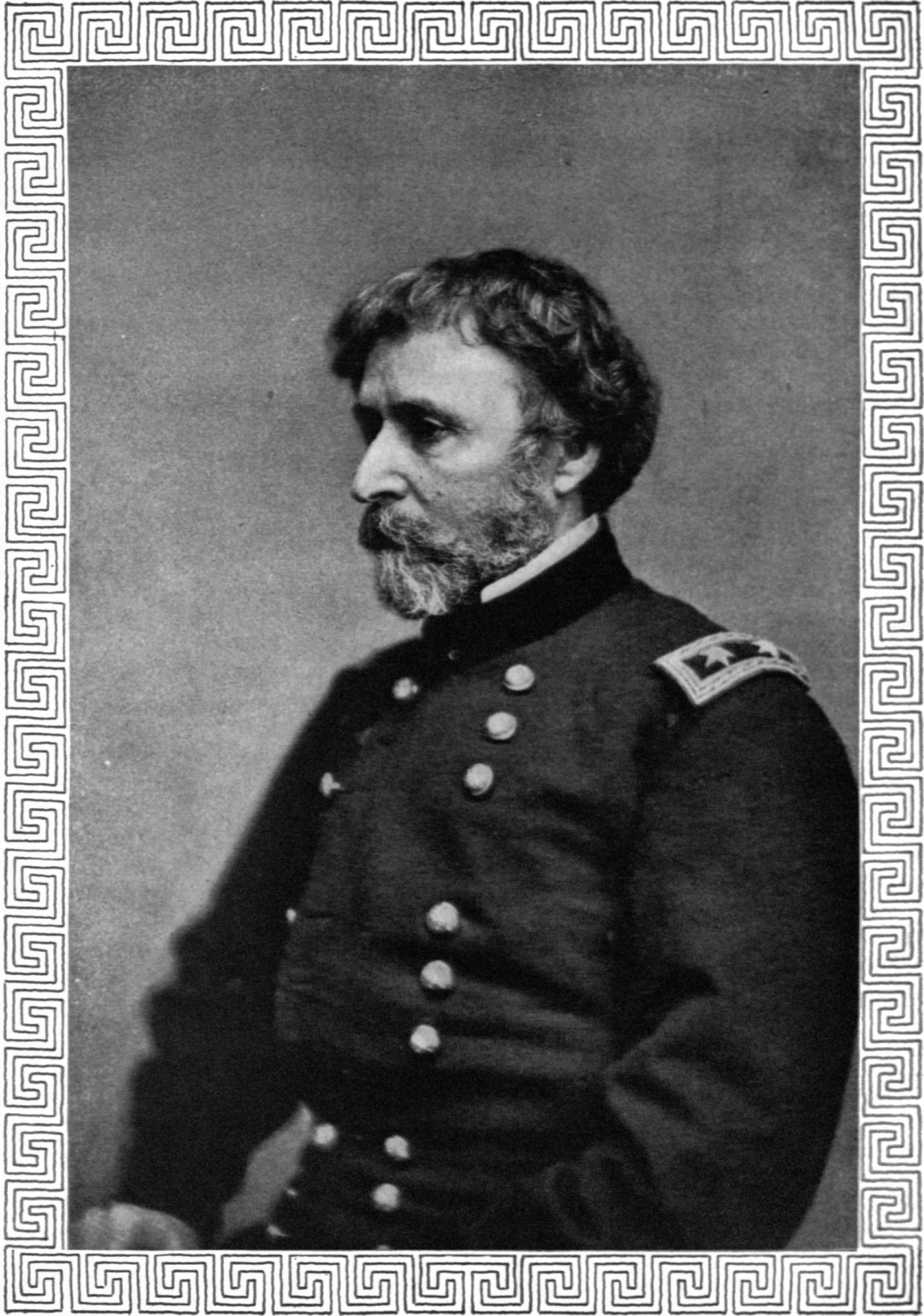
John C. Frémont

Before Lincoln's inauguration, Colfax's name was put forward by Indiana Republicans for appointment as postmaster general. President Lincoln wrote him a warm letter stating that he considered him qualified and foretelling "a bright future" for the 37-year-old, but that he had already promised a cabinet position to another Hoosier, Caleb Blood Smith.

=== Speaker of the House ===
Colfax faced a difficult reelection campaign in 1862 due to strong antiwar sentiments in Indiana, but won a narrow victory over Democrat David Turpie. Among the incumbents defeated that year was Speaker of the House Galusha Grow. When the 38th Congress convened in December 1863, Colfax was elected speaker, despite President Lincoln's preference for someone less tied to the Radical Republicans. Altogether, Colfax was elected speaker for three congresses:

- 38th Congress
  ■ Schuyler Colfax (R–IN) – 101 (55.50%)
  ■ Samuel S. Cox (D–OH) – 42 (23.08%)
  ■ Others – 39 (21.42%)
- 39th Congress
  ■ Schuyler Colfax (R–IN) – 139 (79.43%)
  ■ James Brooks (D–NY) – 36 (20.57%)
- 40th Congress
  ■ Schuyler Colfax (R–IN) – 127 (80.89%)
  ■ Samuel S. Marshall (D–IL) – 30 (19.11%)

During his first term as speaker, Colfax presided over the establishment of the Freedmen's Bureau, and helped secure congressional passage of the Thirteenth Amendment, which, when ratified by the states, abolished slavery. Though it is unusual for the speaker to vote, except to break a tie, Colfax directed the clerk to call his name after the roll call vote had been taken. He then cast the final vote in favor of the amendment to much applause from its supporters in the House. An observer commenting on Colfax's managerial style said that he "presides over the turbulent assembly with a promptness and decision which have a marvellous effect in expediting business."

=== Reconstruction ===
In 1865, Colfax, along with author Samuel Bowles and Illinois Lieutenant Governor William Bross, set out across the western territories from Mississippi to the California coast to record their experiences. They compiled their observations in an 1869 book called Our New West. Included in their book were details of the views of Los Angeles, with its wide panorama of vast citrus groves and orchards, and conversations with Brigham Young.

On September 17, 1867, Colfax, along with Senator John Sherman, addressed a Republican meeting in Lebanon, Ohio on the political situation in Washington. Colfax said he was firmly against allowing those who participated in the Confederate rebellion to be reinstated in office and control Republican Reconstruction policy. Colfax affirmed that he was not in any way for repudiating the debt caused by the Confederate rebellion. Colfax said Congressional reconstruction would give security and peace to the nation as opposed to President Johnson and his southern Democratic policies. Colfax favored Johnson's impeachment, saying Johnson was recreant, a usurper, and was unfaithful in executing the Reconstruction laws of the land in granting a general amnesty to Southerners who had participated in the rebellion. Colfax told Republicans who were tired of Reconstruction to leave the party and join the Democrats.

=== Election of 1868 ===
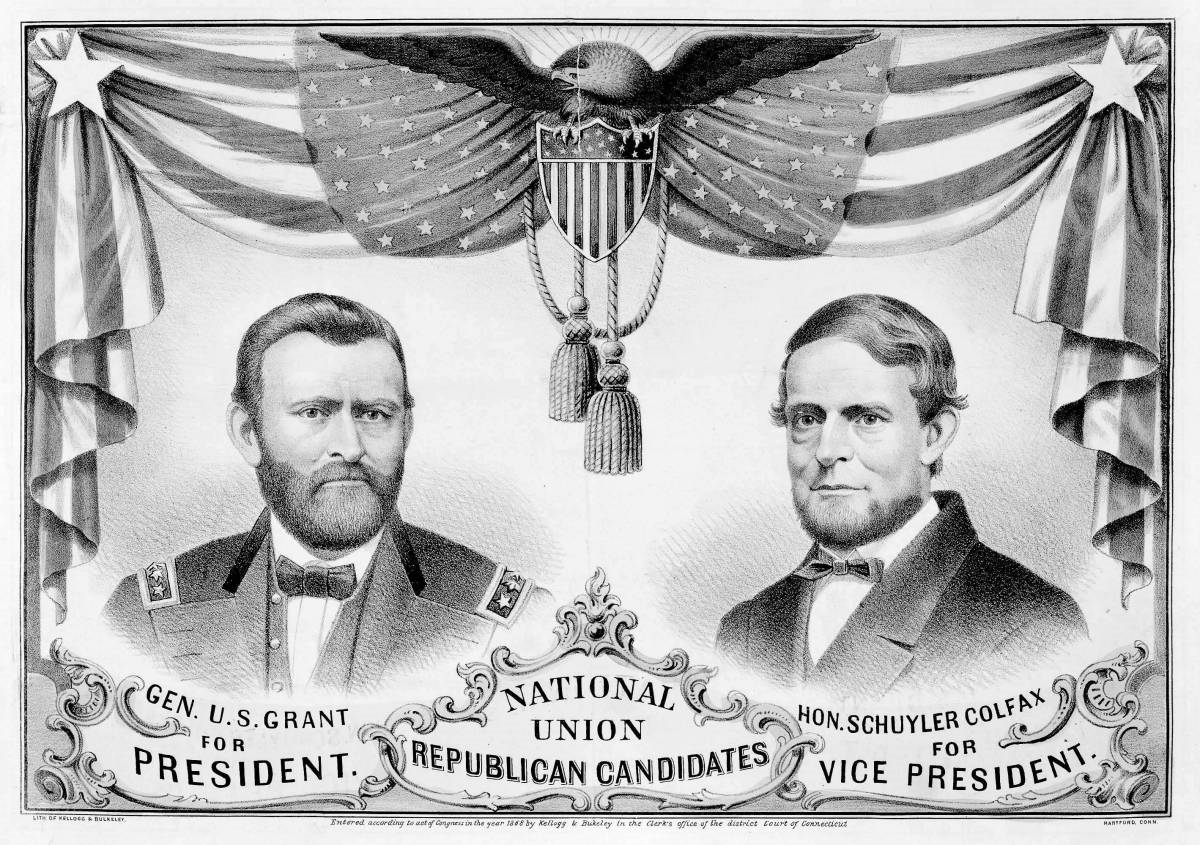
Grant Colfax 1868 Campaign Poster

During the 1868 Republican Convention the Republicans nominated Ulysses S. Grant for president. Known as "Smiler Colfax", Colfax was popular among Republicans for his friendly character, party loyalty, and Radical views on Reconstruction, and he was selected for vice president on the fifth ballot. Grant won the general election, and Colfax was elected the 17th Vice President of the United States.

On March 3, 1869, the final full day of the 40th Congress, Colfax, who was to be sworn into office as vice president the next day, resigned as speaker. Immediately afterward, the House passed a motion declaring Theodore Pomeroy duly elected speaker in place of Colfax. In office for one day, Pomeroy's tenure is the shortest of any speaker of the U.S. House.

== Vice presidency (1869–1873) ==
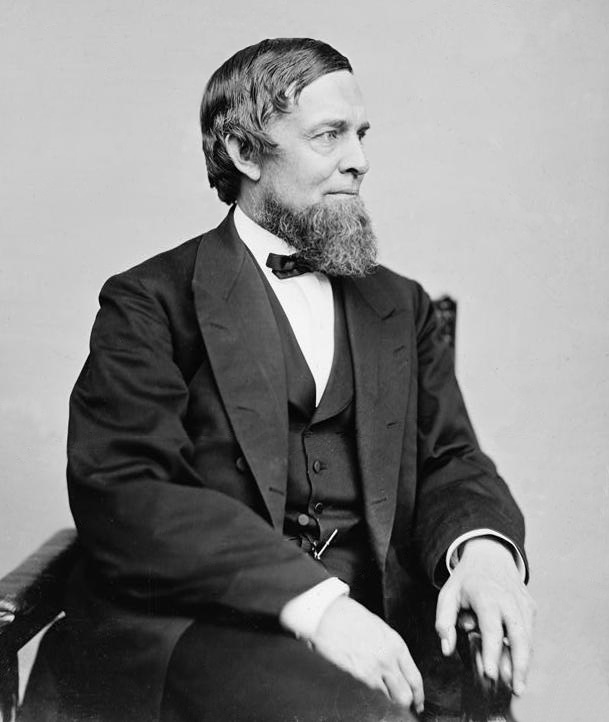
Vice President Schuyler Colfax

Colfax was inaugurated March 4, 1869, and served until March 4, 1873. Grant and Colfax, 46 and 45 respectively at the time of their inauguration, were the youngest presidential and vice presidential team until the inauguration of Bill Clinton and Al Gore in 1993.

Colfax and John Nance Garner, the first vice president under Franklin Roosevelt, are the only two vice presidents to have been the speaker of the House of Representatives prior to becoming vice president, and since the vice president is the president of the Senate, they are the only two people to have served as the presiding officers of both houses of Congress.

=== Italian unity ===
On Friday, January 6, 1871, in a letter from Washington, D.C., published in the New York Times, Colfax recognized and rejoiced in King Victor Emmanuel II's victory of unifying Italy and setting up a new government in Rome. Colfax encouraged Italy to form a republican government that protected religious freedom, regardless of faith, and the civil rights of all individuals, including those who lived in poverty. Colfax said, "for out of this new life of civil and religious liberty will flow peace and happiness, progress and prosperity, with material and national development, and advancement as surely as healthy springs flow from fountains of purity."

=== Election of 1872 ===
Prior to the 1872 Presidential election, Colfax believed that Grant would only serve one term as president. In 1870, Colfax announced he would not run for political office in 1872. Colfax's announcement failed to garner prominent support among Republicans for a presidential bid, as he had planned, while Grant decided to run for a second term. In addition, Liberal Republican interest in Colfax as a possible presidential candidate alienated him from Grant and the regular Republicans. (The Liberal Republicans believed that the Grant administration was corrupt and were against Grant's attempted annexation of Santo Domingo.) Colfax changed his mind and decided to run for the Republican nomination for vice president. He told his supporters that he would accept the nomination if it was offered. However, Colfax's previously stated intent not to run in 1872 had created the possibility of a contested nomination, and Senator Henry Wilson defeated Colfax by 399.5 delegates to 321.5. Grant went on to win a second term, and Wilson became the 18th vice president of the United States.

=== Crédit Mobilier scandal ===
In September 1872, Colfax's reputation was marred by a New York Sun article which indicated that he was involved in the Crédit Mobilier scandal. Colfax was one of several representatives and senators who had been offered (and possibly took) bribes of cash and discounted shares in the Union Pacific Railroad's Crédit Mobilier subsidiary from Congressman Oakes Ames in 1868 for votes favorable to the Union Pacific during the building of the First transcontinental railroad. Henry Wilson was among those accused, but after initially denying a connection, he provided a complicated explanation to a Senate investigating committee, stating that his wife had purchased shares with her own money, and then later cancelled the transaction over concerns about its propriety. Wilson's reputation for integrity was somewhat dampened, but not enough to prevent him from becoming vice president.

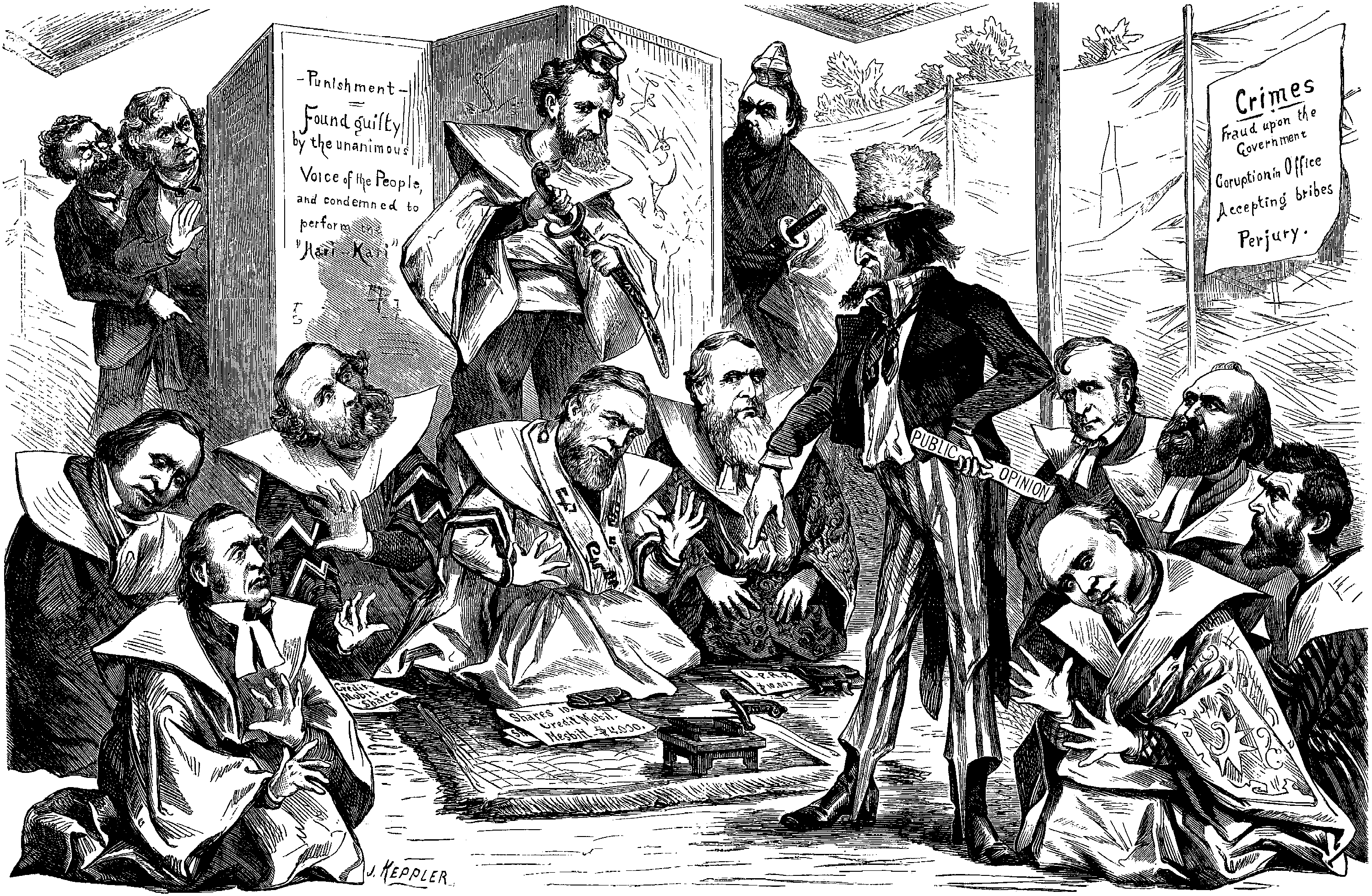
Colfax was castigated for his involvement in the Crédit Mobilier scandal in this March 6, 1873, political cartoon in which Uncle Sam is shown encouraging Colfax to commit hara-kiri.

Colfax also denied involvement and defended himself in person before a House investigative committee, testifying in January 1873 that he had never received a dividend check from Ames. Despite his protests of innocence, the congressional investigation revealed that in 1868 Colfax had taken a $1,200 (~$24,146 in 2025) gift check for 20 shares of Crédit Mobilier stock from Ames. Colfax had deposited $1,200 in his bank account at the same time Ames recorded that he had paid Colfax $1,200. Making matters worse for Colfax, the investigation also revealed that Colfax had also received a $4,000 (~$80,487 in 2025) gift in 1868 from a contractor who supplied envelopes to the federal government while Colfax was chairman of the Committee on Post Offices and Post Roads, and so had influence in the awarding of such contracts. Afterward, a resolution to impeach the vice president was introduced in the House, but failed to pass by a mostly party-line vote, mainly because the incidents took place during his tenure as congressman and because just a few weeks remained in his term.

His political career ruined, Colfax left office under a cloud at the end of his term and never ran for office again. His only consolation on that bitterly cold March day was a hand-written letter from Ulysses Grant. In it, the president wrote,

I sympathize with you in the recent congressional investigations; that I have watched them closely, and that I am satisfied now as I have ever been of your integrity, patriotism and freedom from the charges imputed as if I knew of my own knowledge your innocence. Our official relations have been so pleasant that I would like to keep up the personal relations engendered, through life.

== Post vice-presidency (1873–1885) ==
=== Lecturer and business executive ===
After leaving office in March 1873, Colfax began to recover his reputation, embarking on a successful career as a traveling lecturer offering speeches on a variety of topics. His most requested presentation was one on the life of Abraham Lincoln, whom the nation had begun to turn into an icon. With an expanding population that desired to know more details and context about Lincoln's life and career, an oration from someone who had known him personally was an attraction audiences were willing to pay to hear, and Colfax delivered his Lincoln lecture hundreds of times to positive reviews.

In 1875, he became vice president of the Indiana Reaper and Iron Company. On February 12, 1875, having returned to Washington, D.C., to give a lecture, he advised his friends in Congress who were frustrated over the slow pace of action: "Ah! the way to get out of politics is to get out of politics."

He had remained popular in his home area, and was often encouraged to run again for public office, but he always declined. Finally, in April 1882, when pressed to consider becoming a candidate for his old U.S. House seat in the upcoming election, Colfax announced in a letter to the South Bend Tribune that, while he deeply appreciated how much his friends wanted him to run for public office again, he was satisfied by the 20 years of service he had given during the "stormiest years of our nation's history." He also said that he was enjoying his life as a private citizen, and would neither be a candidate nor accept any nomination for any office in the future, stating that his "only ambition now is to go in and out among my townsmen as a private citizen during what years of life may remain for me to enjoy on this earth".

=== Death and burial ===
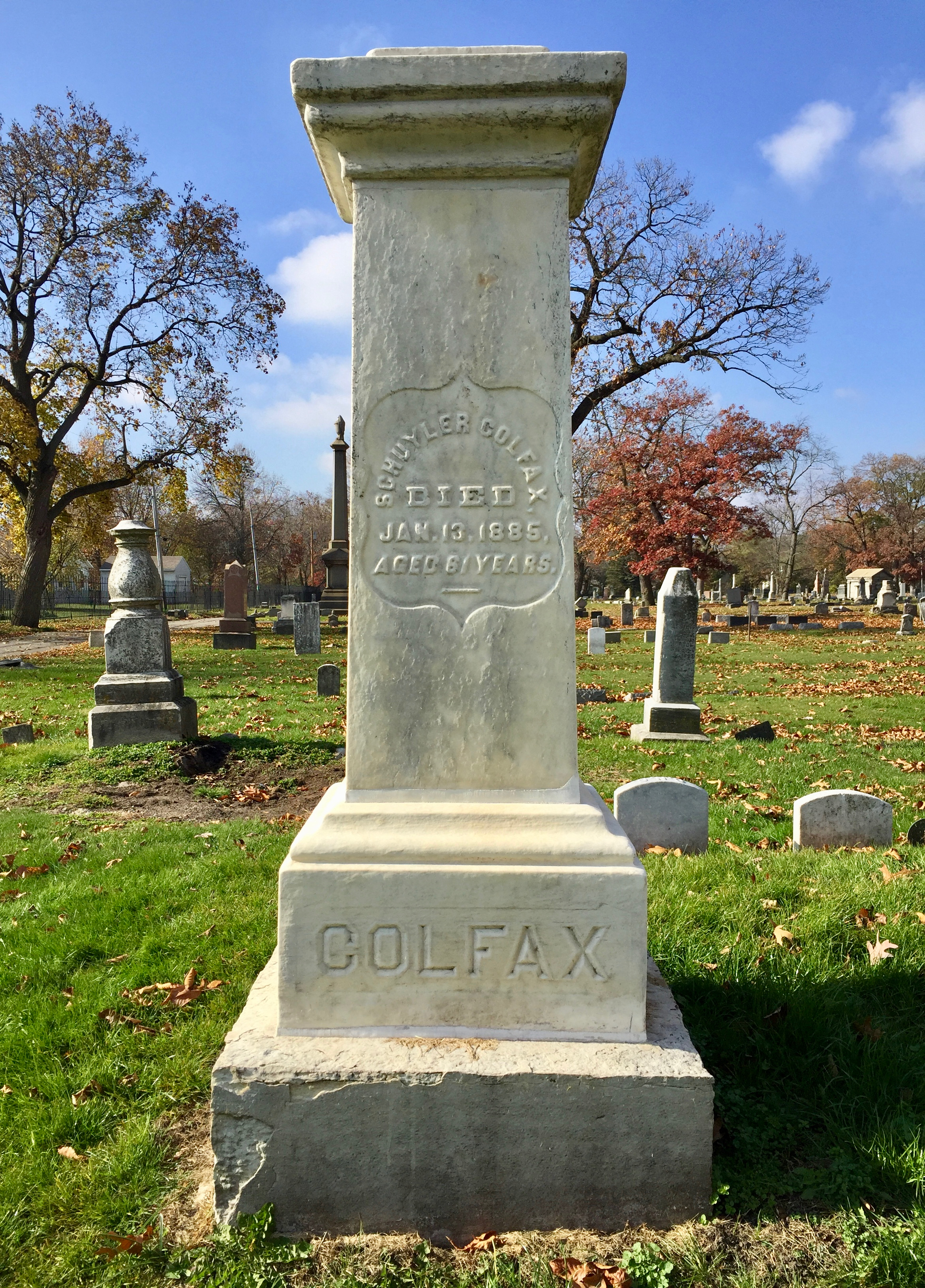
Gravesite of Schuyler Colfax, in South Bend City Cemetery, South Bend, Indiana

January 13, 1885, was a brutally cold day in Mankato, Minnesota. Nevertheless, Colfax walked from Mankato's Front Street depot to the Omaha depot, about three-quarters of a mile (1 kilometer) in −30 °F (−34 °C) weather, intending to change trains on his way to Rock Rapids, Iowa, to give a speech. Five minutes after arriving, Colfax died, because he had a heart attack due to the extreme cold and exhaustion.

He was buried at City Cemetery in South Bend. A historical marker in Mankato's Washington Park, site of the former depot, marks the spot where he died.

== Personal life ==
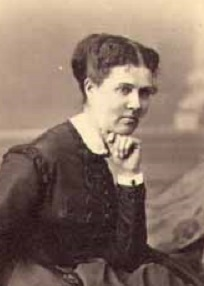
Ellen M. Wade, second wife of Schuyler Colfax

Colfax was married twice:

- On October 10, 1844, he married his childhood friend Evelyn Clark. She died in 1863; they had no children.
- On November 18, 1868, two weeks after winning the vice presidency, he married Ellen (Ella) M. Wade (1836–1911), a niece of Senator Benjamin Wade. They had one son, Schuyler Colfax III (1870–1925), who served as mayor of South Bend, Indiana, from 1898 to 1901. He assumed office at the age of 28, and remains the youngest person to become mayor in the city's history.

Colfax was a member of the Independent Order of Odd Fellows (IOOF). In 1850, Colfax and members William T. Martin of Mississippi and E. G. Steel of Tennessee were appointed to prepare a ritual pertaining to the Rebekah Degree and present a report at the 1851 annual meeting. On September 20, 1851, the IOOF approved the degree and Colfax was credited as its author and founder.

In 1854 Colfax was initiated into the Beta Theta Pi fraternity at DePauw University as an honorary member.

Colfax was initiated into the fraternity of Free & Accepted Masons as an Entered Apprentice at Washington D.C.'s Lebanon Lodge No. 7 on August 15, 1856. He completed his Fellow Craft and Master Mason degrees at St. Joseph Lodge No. 45 in South Bend, Indiana. He was not an especially active member; after failing to pay his dues, he was dropped from the rolls of Lebanon Lodge on December 16, 1864.

== Legacy and historical reputation ==
Colfax's twenty years of public service ended in controversy in 1873 due to the revelation that he was involved in the Crédit Mobilier scandal. He never returned to seek political office in part because he believed that it was best to stay out of politics once leaving office, and in part because he was content with his life as a private citizen. Because of his success as a lecturer, his reputation was somewhat restored.

The Revenue Cutter Service commissioned and named an iron-framed side-wheel steamer after Colfax in 1871. It served along the Atlantic Coast and hosted President McKinley aboard prior to her decommissioning in 1899.

Towns in the U.S. states of California, North Carolina, Illinois, Washington, Wisconsin, Indiana, Iowa, Texas, and Louisiana are named after him. Schuyler, Nebraska, named after Colfax, is the county seat of Colfax County, Nebraska. The ghost town of Colfax, Colorado, was named after him, as was Colfax County, New Mexico.

Colfax Avenue in South Bend is named in his honor. Colfax's home of his adult years stood on that street, at 601 W. Market St. The city later renamed the street in his honor. The Colfax home was demolished and, as of 2025, an Evangelical Presbyterian Church church stands on the spot. There is another Colfax Avenue in Mishawaka, Indiana, the city just east of South Bend. There is also a Colfax Avenue in the Grant City section of Staten Island, one of the boroughs of New York City. The main east–west street traversing Aurora, Denver, and Lakewood, Colorado, and abutting the Colorado State Capitol is named Colfax Avenue in the politician's honor. There is a Colfax Avenue in Minneapolis and suburbs, a Colfax Place in the Highland Square neighborhood in Akron, Ohio; in Roselle Park, New Jersey; and a Colfax Street on Chicago's South Side. There is a Colfax Street in Springdale, Pennsylvania, that leads up Mt. Colfax, as well as one in Palatine, Illinois, in Evanston, Illinois, and in Jamestown, New York. Dallas, Texas, and one of its suburbs, Richardson, each have separate residential roads named Colfax Drive. There is also a Colfax Avenue in the San Fernando Valley area of Los Angeles and in Concord, California, as well as in Benton Harbor, Michigan.

Colfax School was built in South Bend and opened in 1898, just a few blocks from the Schuyler Colfax home. As of 2019, the school building still stands at 914 Lincoln Way West, although it is no longer a school and is known as Colfax Cultural Center. In the 1950s and 1960s, one of the downtown movie theaters was The Colfax. There is a Colfax Elementary School in Pittsburgh, Pennsylvania. The Schuyler-Colfax House in Wayne, New Jersey, which was built by Colfax's ancestors, was added to the National Register of Historic Places in 1973.

The Schuyler Colfax monument in Colfax, California, was made in his honor. There is another statue of Colfax in Indianapolis, Indiana.

== Media portrayals ==
Actor Bill Raymond portrayed Colfax during his time as Speaker in the 2012 Steven Spielberg film Lincoln. While Colfax was in his early forties during the period depicted in the film, Raymond was in his early seventies when the film was made.

== See also ==
- International Association of Rebekah Assemblies
- List of federal political scandals in the United States
- List of vice presidents of the United States by other offices held

== Additional reading ==
- Hollister, Ovando James (1886). Life of Schuyler Colfax. New York: Funk & Wagnalls.

U.S. House of Representatives
Preceded by Norman Eddy	Member of the U.S. House of Representatives from Indiana's 9th congressional district 1855–1869	Succeeded by John P. C. Shanks
Political offices
Preceded by Galusha A. Grow	Speaker of the U.S. House of Representatives; 1863–1869	Succeeded by Theodore M. Pomeroy
Preceded by Andrew Johnson	Vice President of the United States; 1869–1873	Succeeded by Henry Wilson
Party political offices
Preceded by Andrew Johnson^{1}	Republican nominee for Vice President of the United States; 1868	Succeeded by Henry Wilson
Notes and references
1. Lincoln and Johnson ran on the National Union ticket in 1864.
