= Charles Zeitler =

American football player (1871–1903)

- Born: August 1871; Clay Township, Indiana, U.S.
- Died: 1903 (aged 31–32); South Bend, Indiana, U.S.
- Resting place: South Bend City Cemetery; South Bend, Indiana, U.S.

Charles W. Zeitler (August 1871 – 1903) was an American football player from South Bend, Indiana. Zeitler was the first quarterback for the University of Notre Dame to win four games.

Zeitler was born to a family of Bavarian immigrants in Clay Township, just north of South Bend, Indiana. His father, John V. Zeitler, was a very wealthy landowner and farmer who had held local office as a trustee and assessor.

Joining the Notre Dame football team in 1893 at a time when the program had just begun to schedule major opponents in earnest, Zeitler made the most of the opportunity, beginning the season 4–0 with victories over Kalamazoo, Albion, DeLasalle and Hillsdale, before finally falling 0–8 to Chicago in a road game on New Year's Day. The following season, Zeitler moved to the right end position, yielding the quarterback job to Nicholas Dinkel.

Zeitler returned to his homestead after graduation. In 1903, he died of typhoid fever. He is buried in the South Bend City Cemetery.
