= John Pettit =

American judge

United States Senator from Indiana
- In office January 18, 1853 – March 3, 1855
- Preceded by: Charles W. Cathcart
- Succeeded by: Graham N. Fitch

Member of the U.S. House of Representatives from Indiana's 8th district
- In office March 4, 1843 – March 3, 1849
- Preceded by: District created
- Succeeded by: Joseph E. McDonald

6th United States Attorney for the District of Indiana
- In office 1839–1841
- President: Martin Van Buren
- Preceded by: Tilghman Howard
- Succeeded by: Courtland Cushing

Member of the Indiana House of Representatives
- In office 1838-1839

Personal details
- Born: June 24, 1807 Sackets Harbor, New York
- Died: January 17, 1877 (aged 69) Lafayette, Indiana
- Party: Democratic

John Pettit (June 24, 1807 – January 17, 1877) was an American lawyer, jurist, and politician. A United States representative and senator from Indiana, he also served in the court systems of Indiana and Kansas. Born in Sackets Harbor, New York, he completed preparatory studies and admitted to the bar in 1831. He moved to Lafayette, Indiana, where he commenced practice in 1838; he was a member of the Indiana House of Representatives in 1838-1839 and was United States district attorney from 1839 to 1843.

Pettit was elected as a Democrat to the Twenty-eighth, Twenty-ninth, and Thirtieth Congresses (March 4, 1843 - March 3, 1849); he was an unsuccessful candidate for renomination in 1848. In 1850 he was a delegate to the Indiana state constitutional convention and a presidential elector on the Democratic ticket in 1852. He was appointed to the U.S. Senate to fill the vacancy caused by the death of James Whitcomb and served from January 18, 1853, to March 4, 1855; he was an unsuccessful candidate for reelection in 1854.

During his tenure in Congress Pettit was known for annually objecting to the appointment of congressional chaplains on constitutional grounds, arguing that as Congress had no power to legislate in matters of religion, it could not pay for its preaching. Instead, he proposed that chaplains be hired and paid for by voluntary contributions from the members. His objections were routinely overridden.

While in the Senate he was chairman of the Committee on Private Land Claims (Thirty-third Congress). During the Senate debate on the Kansas-Nebraska Act of 1854, Pettit argued in favor of expanding slavery to Kansas, and famously said that Jefferson's idea (in the United States Declaration of Independence) that "all men are created equal" was not a "self-evident truth" but instead "is nothing more to me than a self-evident lie." The debate over Pettit's inflammatory words is credited with reviving Abraham Lincoln's interest in national politics. After his time in Congress, Pettit was chief justice of the United States courts in the Territory of Kansas from 1859 to 1861, and was a judge of the Indiana Supreme Court from 1870 to 1877. He died in Lafayette, Indiana, aged 69, and was interred in Greenbush Cemetery.

U.S. House of Representatives
Preceded by New district	Member of the U.S. House of Representatives from Indiana's 8th congressional district March 4, 1843 – March 3, 1849	Succeeded by Joseph E. McDonald
U.S. Senate
Preceded by Charles W. Cathcart	U.S. senator (Class 3) from Indiana; 1853–1855; Served alongside: Jesse D. Bright	Succeeded by Graham N. Fitch
