= Ellen Maria Colfax =

Second Lady of the United States from 1869 to 1873

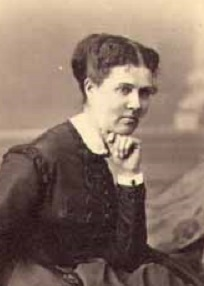

Second Lady of the United States
- In role March 4, 1869 – March 4, 1873
- Vice President: Schuyler Colfax
- Preceded by: Eliza Johnson
- Succeeded by: Eliza Hendricks

Personal details
- Born: Ellen Maria Wade; July 26, 1836 Andover, Ohio, U.S.
- Died: March 4, 1911 (aged 74) South Bend, Indiana, U.S.
- Resting place: City Cemetery; South Bend, Indiana
- Spouse: Schuyler Colfax (m. 1868; died 1885)
- Children: 1

Ellen Maria Colfax (née Wade; July 26, 1836 – March 4, 1911) was the second wife of Schuyler Colfax, who became the first House speaker to be elected vice president when he ran on a ticket headed by Ulysses S. Grant in 1868. She was born in Andover, Ohio in 1836.

== Biography ==
On November 18, 1868, just two weeks after the 1868 presidential election, Ellen Maria Wade married the man who had defeated her uncle, Senator Benjamin Franklin Wade of Ohio, in the race for the Republican vice presidential nomination. They had one son, Schuyler Colfax III, in April 1870. Until Usha Vance in 2026, Colfax was the only sitting Second Lady to give birth.

Her husband, Schuyler Colfax was inaugurated as the 17th vice president on March 4, 1869, and served until March 4, 1873. Likewise, Ellen Maria Colfax became the second lady of the United States.

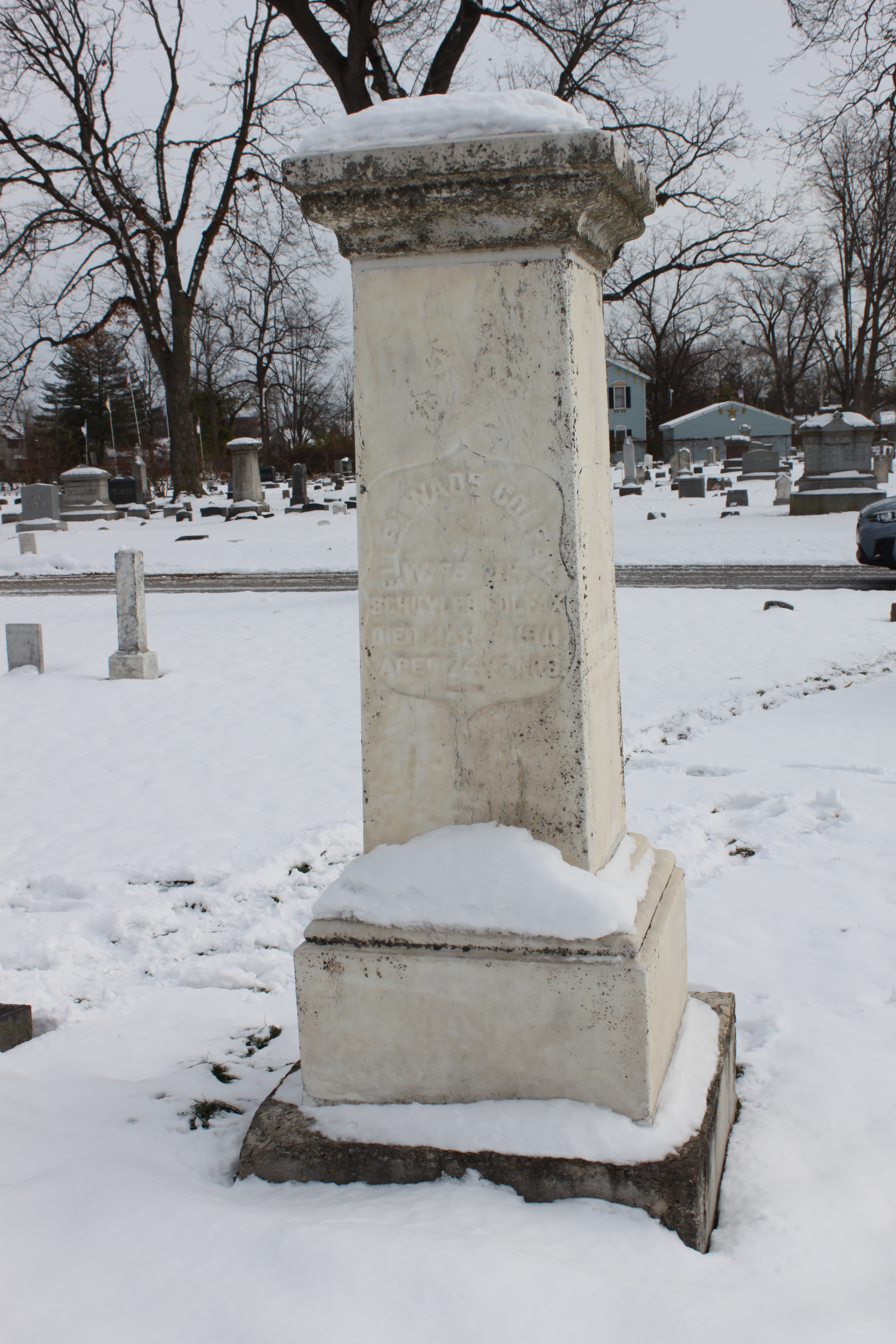
Grave of Colfax in South Bend City Cemetery

She died at her home in South Bend, Indiana in 1911 after a period of poor health, on the 42nd anniversary of her husband's assumption of the vice-presidency. She was survived by her son Schuyler Colfax III. Her funeral was held March 7, 1911, at the Colfax home, and she was buried next to her husband at South Bend City Cemetery.

Honorary titles
Vacant Title last held by Eliza Johnson	Second Lady of the United States; 1869–1873	Vacant Title next held by Eliza Hendricks
