= Peter Studebaker =

American manufacturer

Peter E. Studebaker
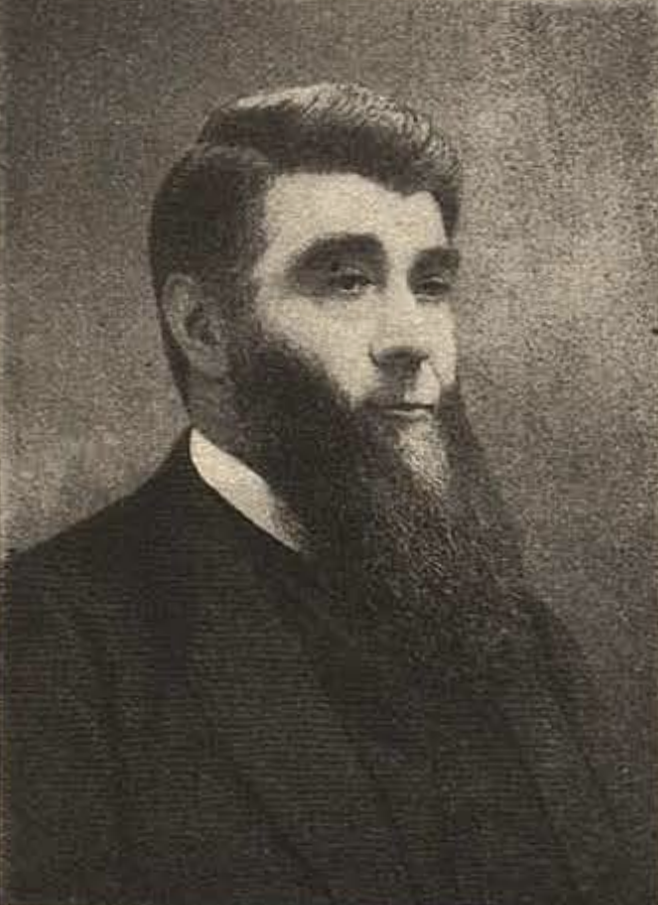
- Photo of Studebaker in a 1924 publication
- Born: Peter Everst Studebaker; April 1, 1836; Ashland, Ohio, U.S.
- Died: October 9, 1897 (aged 61); Alma, Michigan, U.S.
- Resting place: South Bend City Cemetery; South Bend, Indiana, U.S.
- Occupations: Salesman; executive
- Political party: Republican
- Spouses: Dora Handley (m. 1856, died) Alice Woodbury Mitchell (died 1869): Mary Alice Ewing Gunthie
- Children: 3
- Relatives: Henry Studebaker (brother); Clement Studebaker (brother); John Studebaker (brother)

Peter Everst Studebaker (April 1, 1836 – October 9, 1897) was treasurer and chairman for the Studebaker wagon business. He was known for helping his brothers expand the business to St. Joseph, Missouri, Chicago and throughout the United States in the 1860s and 1870s.

== Early life ==
Peter Everst Studebaker was born on April 1, 1836, in Ashland, Ohio, to Rebecca and John C. Studebaker. He attended schools in Ashland. Studebaker moved to South Bend, Indiana, in 1852 and worked as a clerk at a dry goods store. He then started a merchandising business as a peddler.

== Career ==
In 1856, Studebaker moved to Goshen, Indiana, to open a retail business with his brother-in-law Phillip Welch. In 1860, Studebaker became a dealer for the Studebaker wagon business of his two older brothers, Henry and Clement. In 1864, he joined the company officially. He was then placed in charge of sales and moved to St. Joseph, Missouri, to establish the first retail branch of the company in 1865. The branch was organized to sell wagons to pioneers traveling west. He worked with the branch until 1872 when he moved back to South Bend. Studebaker led the sales department of the business. He helped the company expand its branches throughout the country, including its Chicago, New York and San Francisco branches. He lived in Chicago partially for a period of ten years. In 1872, Studebaker moved back to South Bend to serve as treasurer of the company. He served as chairman of the executive committee until his death. He also served as vice president of the company until his death. Following his death, his son Wilbur F. succeeded him as chairman.

Studebaker was a Republican. He campaigned two months for James A. Garfield during the 1880 United States presidential election.

== Personal life ==
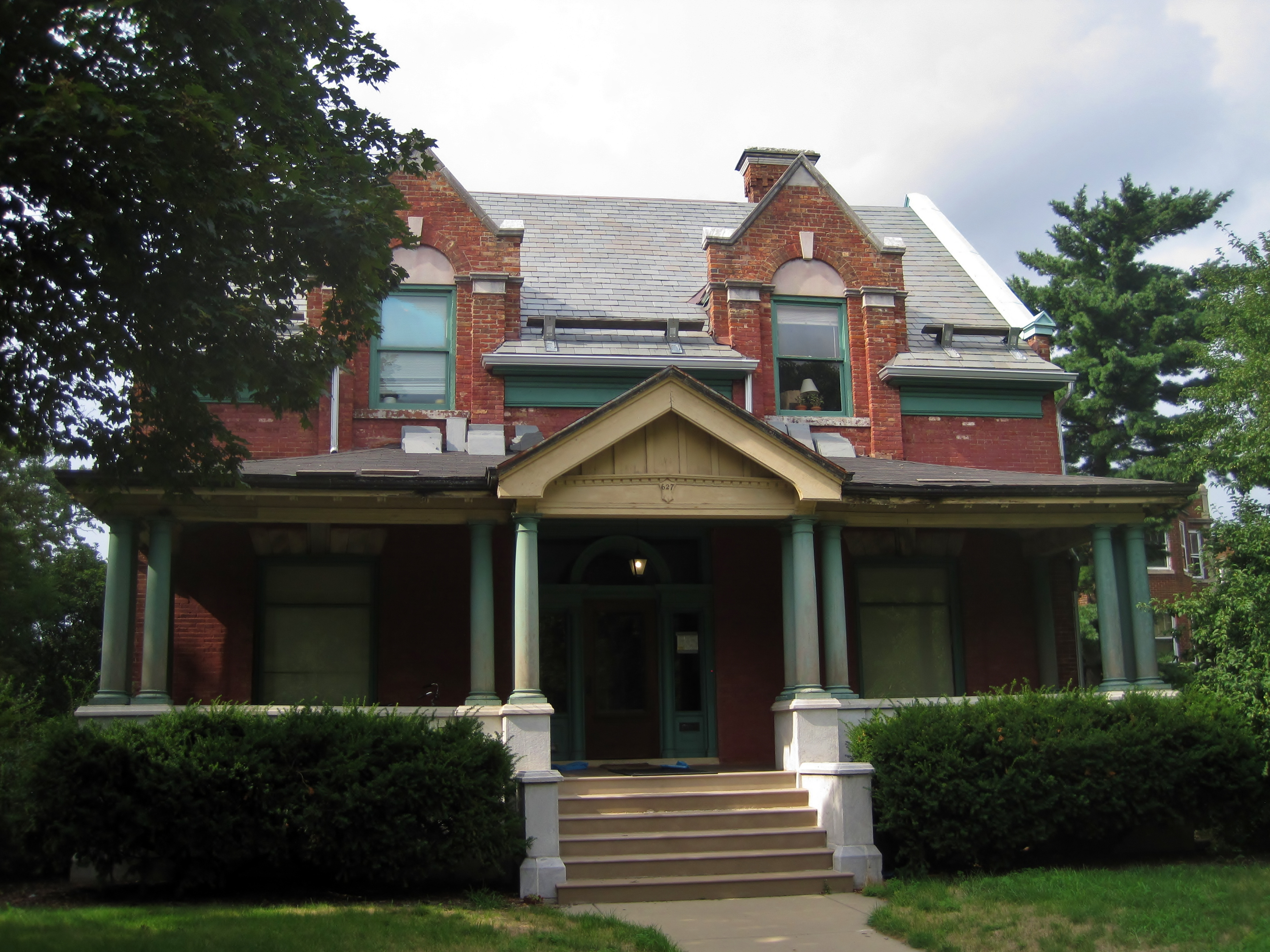
Home of Studebaker in South Bend

Studebaker married Dora Handley of Cincinnati, Ohio, in 1856. They had three children, Wilbur F., Mary R. and Dora L. His wife died in 1864 or 1865. In 1865 or 1866, Studebaker married Alice (née Woodbury) Mitchell of White Pigeon, Michigan. She died in 1869. In 1871 or 1872, Studebaker married Mary Alice (née Ewing) Gunthie of South Bend. Studebaker was an Episcopalian.

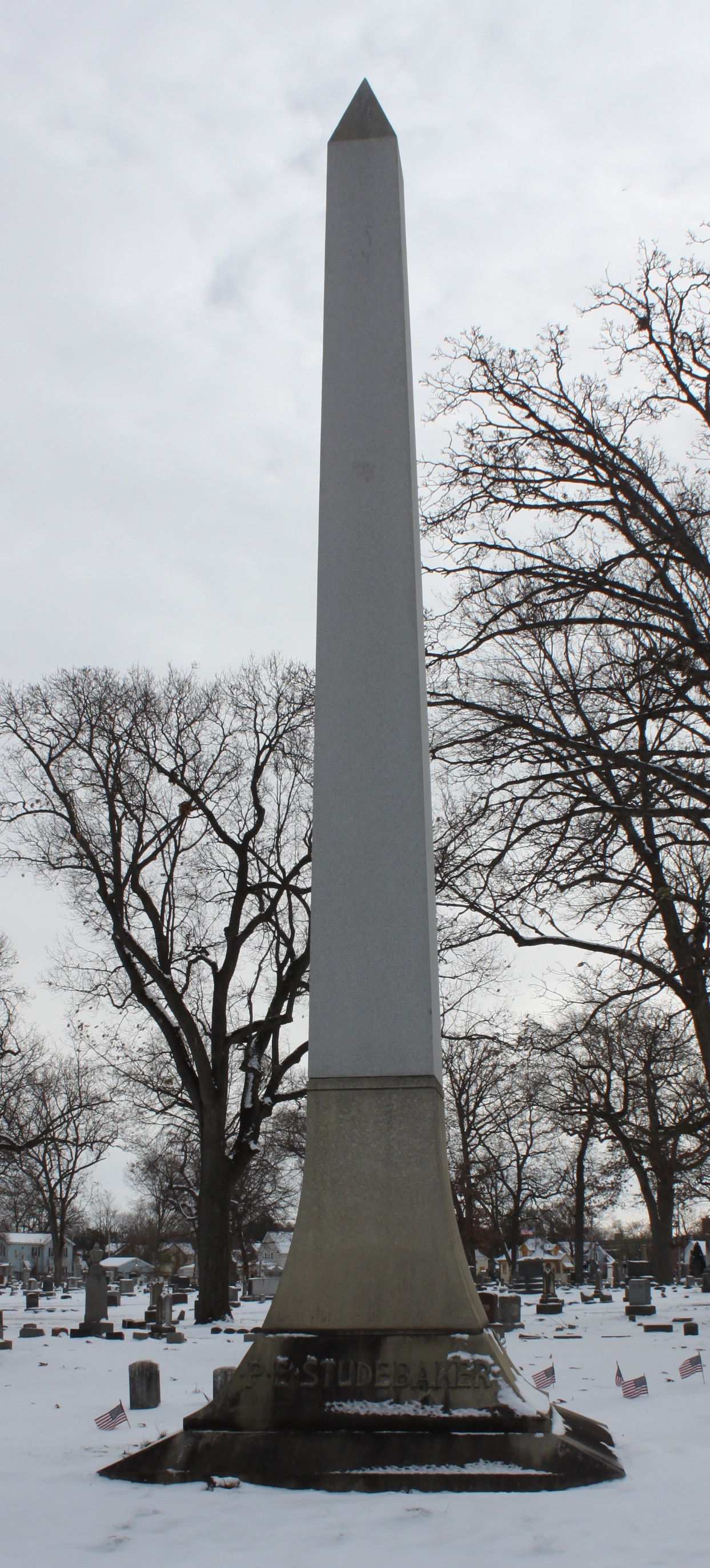
Grave of Studebaker in South Bend City Cemetery

Studebaker was diagnosed with heart disease in 1896. In September 1897, Studebaker suffered a heart attack while horseback riding in South Bend and a second heart attack a few days later. Studebaker sought treatment for his heart disease in Alma, Michigan, in October 1897. He died in Alma on October 9, 1897. He was buried at South Bend City Cemetery.

== Legacy ==
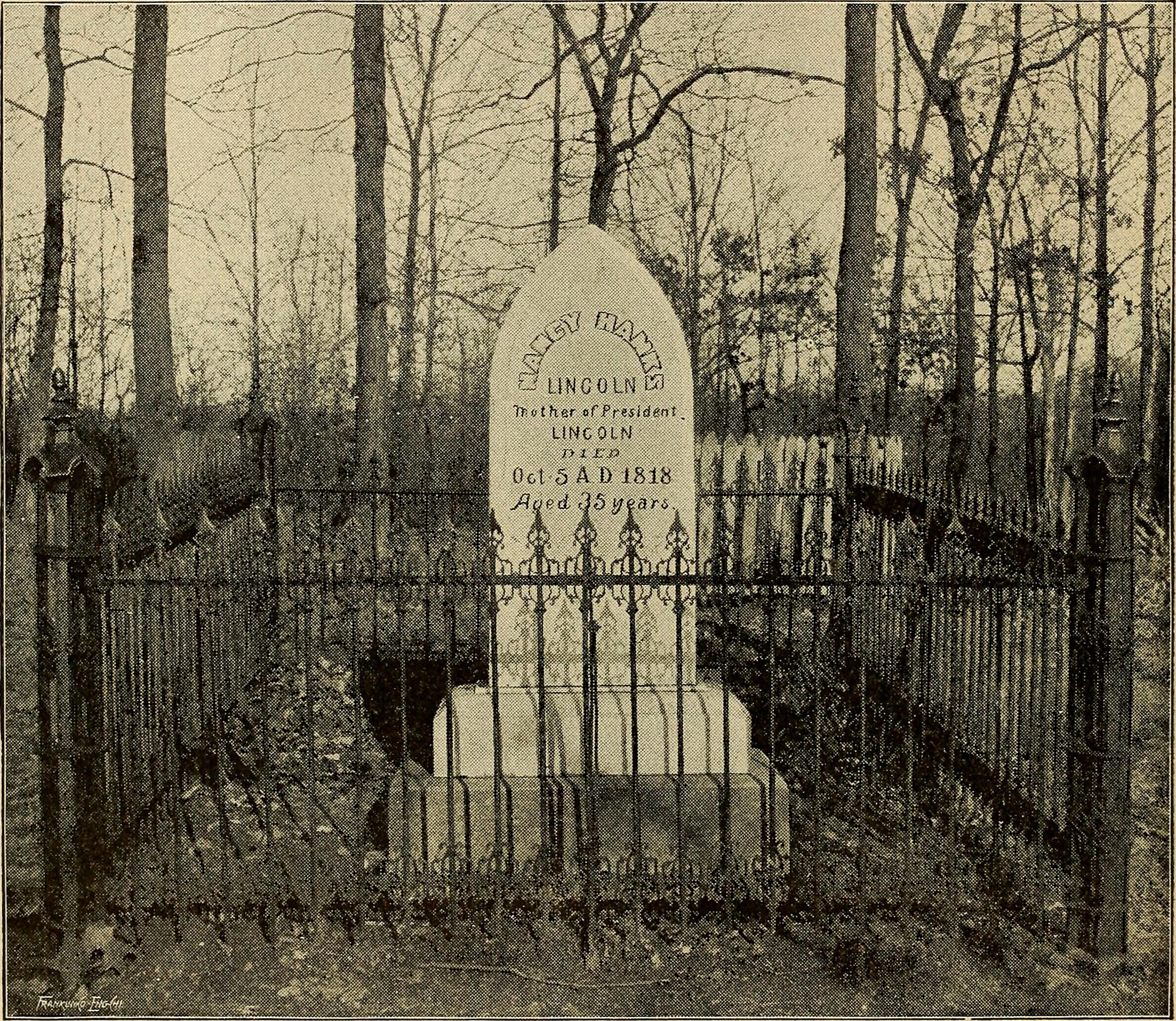
Grave of Nancy Lincoln in 1896

Studebaker donated to provide a marker in Spencer County, Indiana, for Nancy Lincoln, the mother of President Abraham Lincoln. Studebaker helped fund the Episcopal Church in South Bend.
