= Jesse D. Bright =

American politician (1812–1875)

Jesse Bright
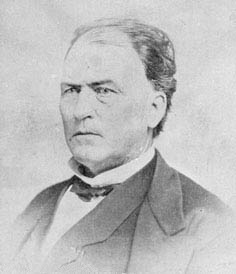
- Photograph of Bright, undated

President pro tempore of the United States Senate
- In office June 12, 1860 – June 26, 1860
- Preceded by: Benjamin Fitzpatrick
- Succeeded by: Benjamin Fitzpatrick
- In office June 11, 1856 – January 6, 1857
- Preceded by: Charles E. Stuart
- Succeeded by: James M. Mason
- In office December 5, 1854 – June 9, 1856
- Preceded by: Lewis Cass
- Succeeded by: Charles E. Stuart

United States Senator from Indiana
- In office March 4, 1845 – February 5, 1862
- Preceded by: Albert Smith White
- Succeeded by: Joseph A. Wright

Lieutenant Governor of Indiana
- In office December 6, 1843 – March 4, 1845
- Governor: James Whitcomb
- Preceded by: Samuel Hall
- Succeeded by: Paris C. Dunning

Member of the Indiana Senate
- In office 1841–1843

Member of the Kentucky House of Representatives from Carroll and Trimble Counties
- In office August 5, 1867 – August 7, 1871
- Preceded by: Haydon S. Wright (Carroll); Richard Bell (Trimble)
- Succeeded by: J. R. Sanders

Personal details
- Born: Jesse David Bright; December 18, 1812 Norwich, New York, U.S.
- Died: May 20, 1875 (aged 62) Baltimore, Maryland, U.S.
- Party: Democratic

Jesse David Bright (December 18, 1812 – May 20, 1875) was the ninth Lieutenant Governor of Indiana and U.S. Senator from Indiana who served as President pro tempore of the Senate on three occasions. He was the only senator from a Northern state to be expelled for being a Confederate sympathizer, and also the last Senator to be expelled on Confederate rebellion. As a leading Copperhead he opposed the Civil War. He was frequently in competition with Governor Joseph A. Wright, the leader of the state's Republican Party.

Bright owned 21 slaves in Kentucky.

== Early life and career ==
Jesse Bright was born into a German family in Norwich, New York, which moved to Madison, Indiana, in 1820. Bright attended public schools as a child. He studied law and was admitted to the bar in 1831, commencing practice in Madison. He was elected a judge of the probate court of Jefferson County, Indiana, in 1834, was a United States Marshal for the district of Indiana from 1840 to 1841 and served in the Indiana Senate from 1841 to 1843. In 1842, he was elected Lieutenant Governor of Indiana and served as such from 1843 to 1845.

== U.S. Senate ==
Bright was elected as a Democrat to the United States Senate in 1844, and was reelected in 1850 and 1856, serving from 1845 to 1862. He was chairman of the Committee on Enrolled Bills from 1845 to 1847, of the Committee on Public Buildings from 1845 to 1847, of the Committee on Revolutionary Claims from 1847 to 1849, of the Committee on Roads and Canals from 1849 to 1855 and of the Committee on Public Buildings and Grounds from 1857 to 1861. He was also President pro tempore of the Senate from 1854 to 1856, 1856 to 1857, and in 1860. As such, he was first in the presidential line of succession in the first two terms due to the death of Vice President William R. King in April 1853.

In the Senate, Bright was not known as a great orator but was very able in committee work. One enemy of his was Illinois Senator Stephen A. Douglas after he voted against keeping Bright in the Senate. He was, however, a very close friend and confidant of William Hayden English, a U.S. Representative from Indiana. In 1857, President James Buchanan offered him the post of Secretary of State, but he declined.

In the beginning of 1862, the Senate of the 37th Congress, which was composed of twenty-nine Republicans and ten Democrats, voted to expel him for acknowledging Jefferson Davis as President of the Confederate States and for facilitating the sale of arms to the Confederacy. The issue was brought up when Minnesota Senator Morton S. Wilkinson introduced the Senate to a letter dated March 1, 1861, written to Davis and signed by Bright, involving firearm trades. The letter was found on a captured gun trader crossing the Confederate border during the First Battle of Bull Run.

He was the fourteenth senator expelled from Congress during the Civil War and remains the latest senator to be expelled. Soon after his expulsion from the Senate, Union authorities confiscated his property in Port Fulton, Indiana, which became Jefferson General Hospital, the third-largest hospital during the Civil War. He was an unsuccessful candidate in filling the vacancy caused by his own expulsion in 1863. Bright's longtime intra-party rival, Envoy to Prussia and War Democrat Joseph A. Wright, succeeded him in the Senate.

== Later life and career ==
After losing his home in Indiana, Bright moved to Covington, Kentucky. He was a member of the Kentucky House of Representatives from 1867 to 1871, was a presidential elector on the Democratic ticket from Kentucky in the 1868 presidential election, and was president of the Raymond City Coal Company from 1871 to 1875. He moved to Baltimore, Maryland, in 1874 and died there on May 20, 1875. He was interred in Green Mount Cemetery in Baltimore.

== See also ==
- List of United States senators expelled or censured

Political offices
Preceded by Samuel Hall	Lieutenant Governor of Indiana; 1843–1845	Succeeded by Paris C. Dunning
Preceded by Lewis Cass	President pro tempore of the United States Senate; 1854–1856	Succeeded by Charles E. Stuart
Preceded by Charles E. Stuart	President pro tempore of the United States Senate; 1856–1857	Succeeded by James M. Mason
Preceded by Benjamin Fitzpatrick	President pro tempore of the United States Senate; 1860	Succeeded by Benjamin Fitzpatrick
U.S. Senate
Preceded by Albert Smith White	U.S. Senator (Class 1) from Indiana; 1845–1862; Served alongside: Edward A. Hannegan, James Whitcomb, Charles W. Cathcart, John Pettit, Graham N. Fitch, Henry S. Lane	Succeeded by Joseph A. Wright
Preceded by Simon Cameron	Chair of the Senate Public Buildings Committee; 1846–1847	Succeeded by Robert M. T. Hunter
Preceded by James Bayard as Chair of the Senate Public Buildings Committee	Chair of the Joint Public Buildings Committee; 1857–1861	Succeeded by Solomon Foot
