= John Studebaker =

American automobile pioneer (1833–1917)

John Mohler Studebaker
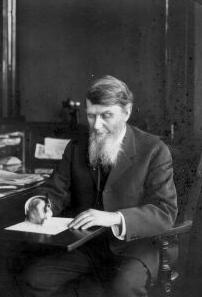
- John Studebaker at work
- Born: 10 October 1833; Gettysburg, Pennsylvania
- Died: 16 March 1917 (aged 83)
- Resting place: South Bend City Cemetery; South Bend, Indiana, U.S.
- Occupations: Co-founder and president of the Studebaker Corporation
- Relatives: Clement Studebaker (brother); Peter Studebaker (brother)

Pennsylvania Historical Marker
- Type: Roadside
- Designated: December 06, 1948
- Location: Oxford Rd. (SR 1015), just off PA 234, 1/2 mile E of Heidlersburg

California Historical Landmark
- Reference no.: 142, Placerville, California

John Mohler Studebaker (10 October 1833 – 16 March 1917) was the Pennsylvania Dutch co-founder and later executive of what would become the Studebaker Corporation automobile company. He was the third son of the founding Studebaker family, and played a key role in the growth of the company during his years as president, from 1868 until his death in 1917.

== Career ==
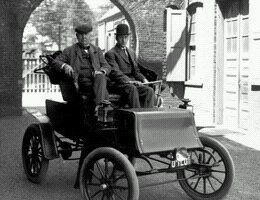
Thomas Edison on his 1903 Electric Studebaker, the first of the electric automobiles

John Mohler Studebaker was born in Gettysburg, Pennsylvania to John S. and Rebecca Mohler Studebaker, and moved to Ashland County, Ohio with his family in 1836. While his two elder brothers Henry and Clem became blacksmiths, John went to Placerville, California, lured by stories of the gold rush. After arriving, he realized that much mining employment in California had been taken, and he accepted an opportunity to manufacture wheelbarrows for miners, earning himself the nickname of "Wheelbarrow Johnny". The site of John's business is now number 142 of California's Historic Landmarks.

John went to South Bend, Indiana in 1852 and contributed $8,000 (equal to $309,600 today) he had made in California to his brothers' funds to expand the Studebaker Wagon Corporation. They began to supply wagons for the Union Army in the American Civil War, becoming the Studebaker Brothers Manufacturing Company in 1868, with John as its president.

In December 1901, at the age of 68, John was the last survivor of the founding family and, after a visit to a motor show in Chicago, he began to accept the urging of his son-in-law Fred Fish that electric cars, initially, would be the future of the Studebaker company. In 1902, five battery-powered-models were made, and 20 were sold, including one which John owned personally.

Fish, who married John Studebaker's daughter Grace in 1891, joined the company and provided the impetus for the production of "horseless carriages". In 1904 he and John negotiated a deal with Garford of Elyria, Ohio to put Studebaker bodies on gasoline-powered chassis, creating the Studebaker-Garford brand name. By 1907 market gains by cars had begun to overtake those of wagons. The following year, Studebaker purchased a third of the Everitt Metzger Flanders Company and entered into a distribution agreement with EMF which was organized on 2 June 1908 following the acquisition of the automobiles companies known as Northern and Wayne. By 1909, Studebaker had made $9.5 million by distributing horseless vehicles manufactured in co-operation with other companies, and acquired the remainder of E.M.F from J.P. Morgan & Co. in 1910, thus taking over the company. In 1911 the company refinanced and reincorporated as the Studebaker Corporation, producing gasoline-driven automobiles, discontinuing electric vehicles but retaining production of wagons and carriages. John stated:

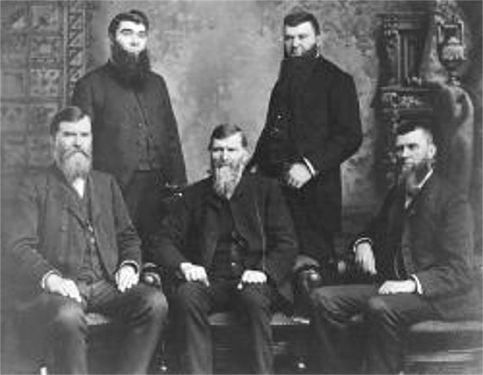
The five Studebaker brothers

The automobile has come to stay. But when a man has no business, it is a rather expensive luxury, and I would advise no man, be he farmer or merchant, to buy one until he has sufficient income to keep it up. A horse and buggy will afford a great deal of enjoyment ….

On the outbreak of World War I, John telegrammed president Woodrow Wilson to offer the Studebaker facilities as a site for war material production, and the company went on to manufacture military vehicles throughout the war. John was still serving as honorary president when he died.

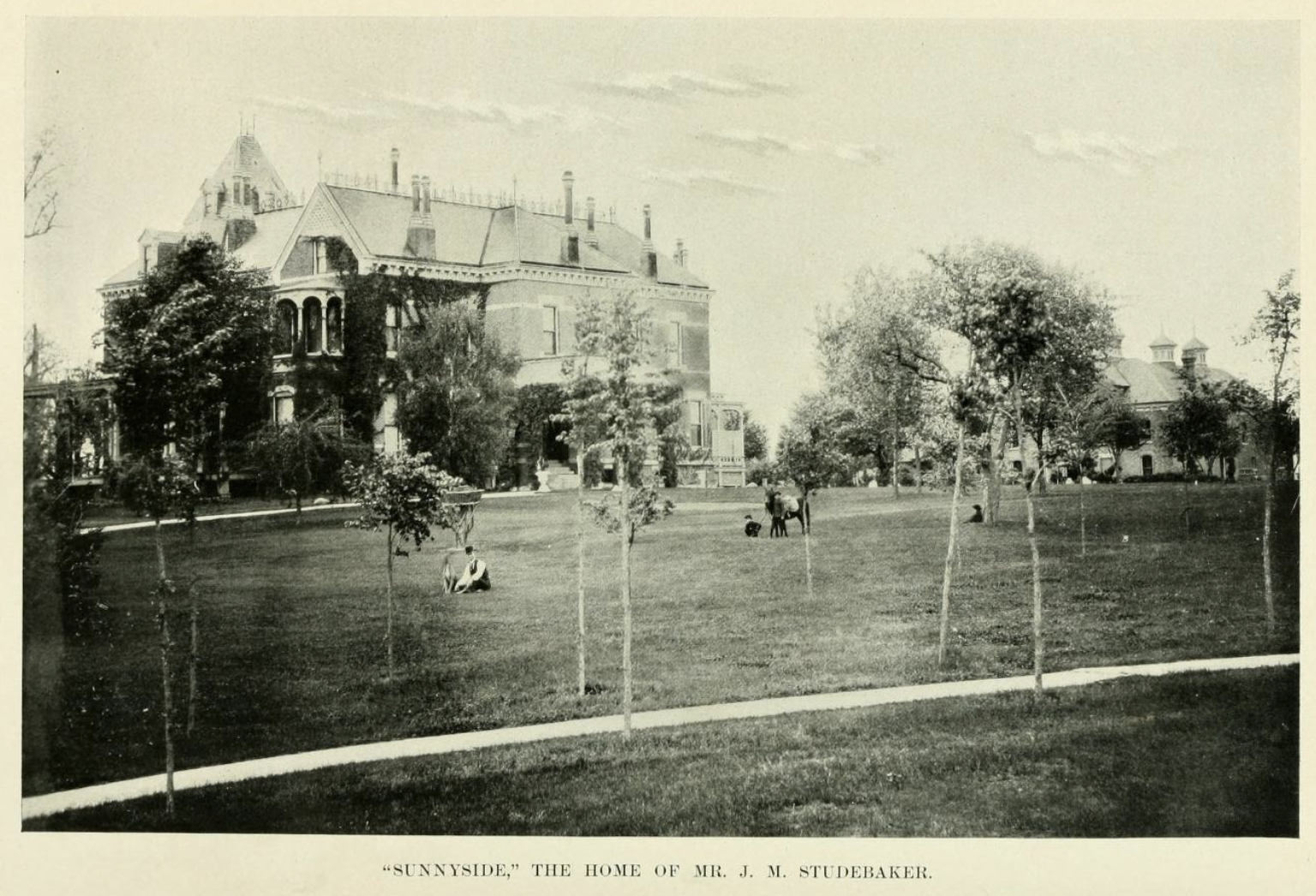
"Sunnyside", Studebaker's home

Studebaker died on March 16, 1917. He was buried at the Studebaker family mausoleum at South Bend City Cemetery. His name was added to the Automotive Hall of Fame.

== Success in Ashland Carriage Company ==
John Studebaker, one of the founders of the Studebaker Corporation, resided in Ashland, Ohio from 1835 to 1850. He and his family moved from Pennsylvania to Ashland, Ohio in 1835. Upon arrival, they named their new homestead on U.S. Route 250, "Pleasant Ridge," which was his mother's maiden name. John and his two older brothers Henry and Clem helped their father with their family blacksmith and carriage shop at their home. Economic times were tough for 19-year-old John. His dream was to mine for gold and became aware of the gold rush taking place out west. John built a custom carriage and traveled to California, which took five months. Upon arriving in California, he was offered a job as a wagon maker, but turned down the offer to mine for gold. He decided to build wheelbarrows for miners, and sold wheelbarrows for ten dollars each.

He saved and invested $8,000 in his first company which built carriages. Studebaker's company was the largest producer of horse-drawn vehicles. It was so successful that President Lincoln and General Grant both owned Studebaker carriages.

In the late 1890s the Studebaker Company converted from horse-drawn vehicles to gasoline-propelled automobiles. In the next seven years, the company sold more than 2,481 passenger cars and trucks. The Studebaker Company operated seven plants in South Bend, Detroit, Chicago, and Walkerville, Ontario, with a net profit of $30,126,600. The Studebaker Company merged with Packard in 1954.

In Ashland, Ohio, a bronze plaque honoring Studebaker is on US Route 250 at the site of the family homestead, "Pleasant Ridge".

In 1959 actor Gil Lasky played Studebaker in the episode "Wheelbarrow Johnny" of the syndicated television anthology series, Death Valley Days, hosted by Stanley Andrews. In the story line, Studebaker fails at gold mining because con men take advantage of him. His talent for making wheelbarrows paves the way for a bright future in the transportation industry.
