= South Bend City Cemetery =

Cemetery in Indiana, US

- U.S. National Register of Historic Places
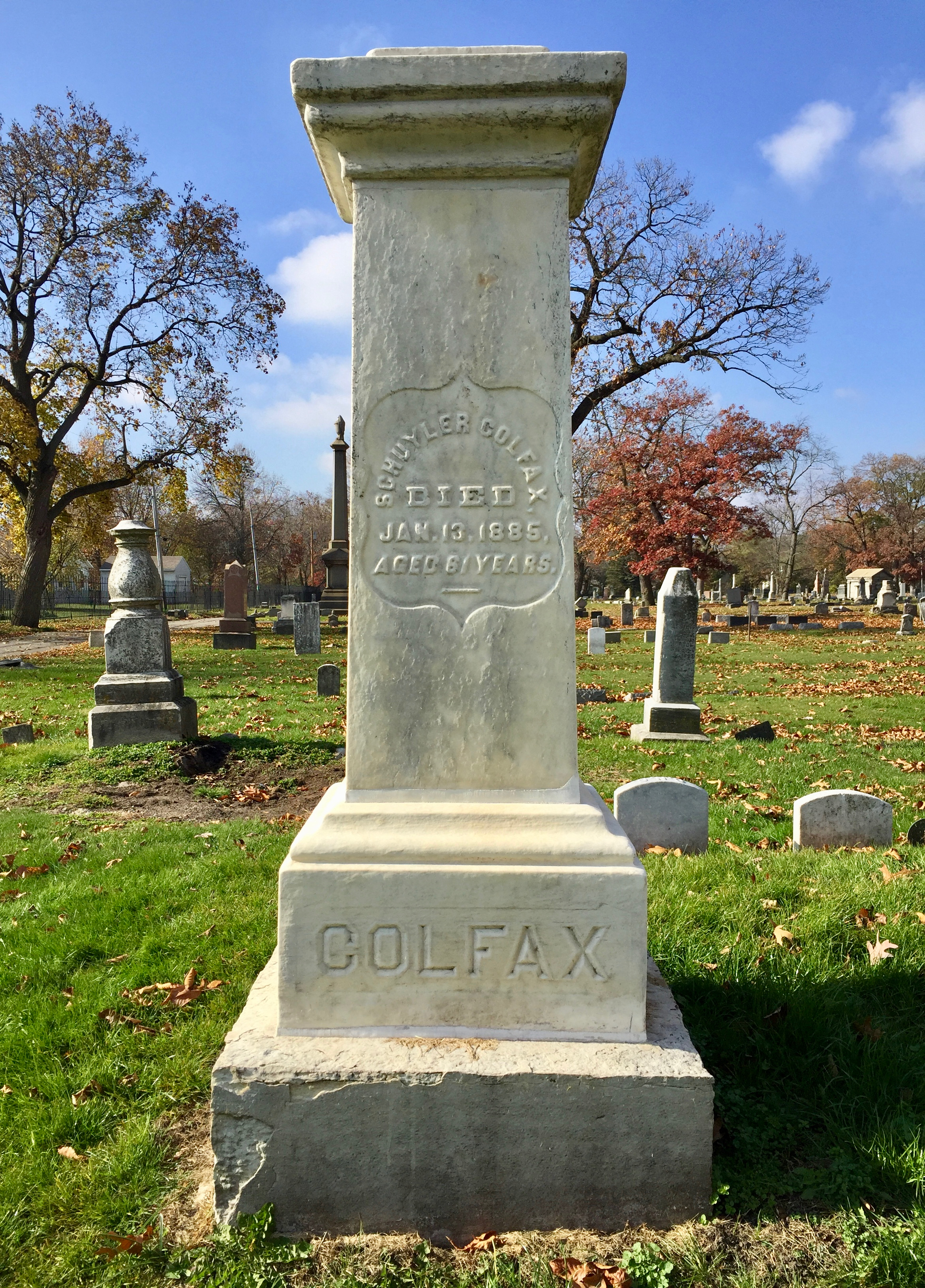
- Grave of the 17th U.S. Vice President Schuyler Colfax.

- Location within Indiana Location within the United States
- Location: South Bend, Indiana
- Coordinates: 41°40′41″N 86°16′04″W
- Built: 1831
- NRHP reference No.: 100003189
- Added to NRHP: December 4, 2018

The South Bend City Cemetery is a historic cemetery in South Bend, Indiana.

== History ==
The South Bend City Cemetery was established in 1831, when Lathrop Taylor and Alexis Coquillard donated the land upon which it was built. Jacob Roof was the first burial was on August 25, 1831. The Miller Mausoleum was built in 1882 and the Studebaker-Milburn Mausoleum in 1884. The sexton's cottage, designed by Parker & Austin, was built in 1899, the same year that the cast iron entrance gate was installed at the Elm Street entrance.

By December 1911, there were 7,190 burials at City Cemetery. A monument in memory of the veterans of the American Civil War of 1861–1865 was added in 1914 thanks to a donation from Union Army colonel Norman Eddy.

The cemetery has been listed on the National Register of Historic Places since December 4, 2018.

== Notable burials ==
- E. Volney Bingham (1844–1922), state senator
- John Birdsell (1815–1894), American manufacturer and businessman
- Ellen Maria Colfax (1836–1911), second wife of Schuyler Colfax and Second Lady of the United States
- Evelyn Clark Colfax (1823–1863), first wife of Schuyler Colfax
- Schuyler Colfax (1823–1885), 17th Vice President of the United States.
- Schuyler Colfax III (1870–1925), mayor of South Bend
- Norman Eddy (1810–1872), U.S. Representative
- William G. George, first mayor of South Bend
- Joseph and Mary McKinley, the paternal grandparents of President William McKinley
- H. B. Miller (1819–1889), member of New York Senate and Illinois House of Representatives
- William Miller (1821–1901), mayor of South Bend
- Samuel Sample (1796–1855), U.S. Representative
- Thomas S. Stanfield (1816–1885), state politician and railroad executive
- Clement Studebaker (1831–1901), wagon and carriage manufacturer (formerly interred in Studebaker-Milburn Mausoleum)
- Clement Studebaker Jr. (1871–1932), businessman (interred in Studebaker mausoleum)
- John Studebaker (1833–1917), businessman (interred in Studebaker mausoleum)
- Peter Studebaker (1836–1897), treasurer and chairman of Studebaker Corporation
- Enoch R. Weiss (1848–1917), Indian Campaigns Medal of Honor
- Charles Zeitler (1871–1903), American football player for the University of Notre Dame
