= Eliza Hendricks =

Second Lady of the United States

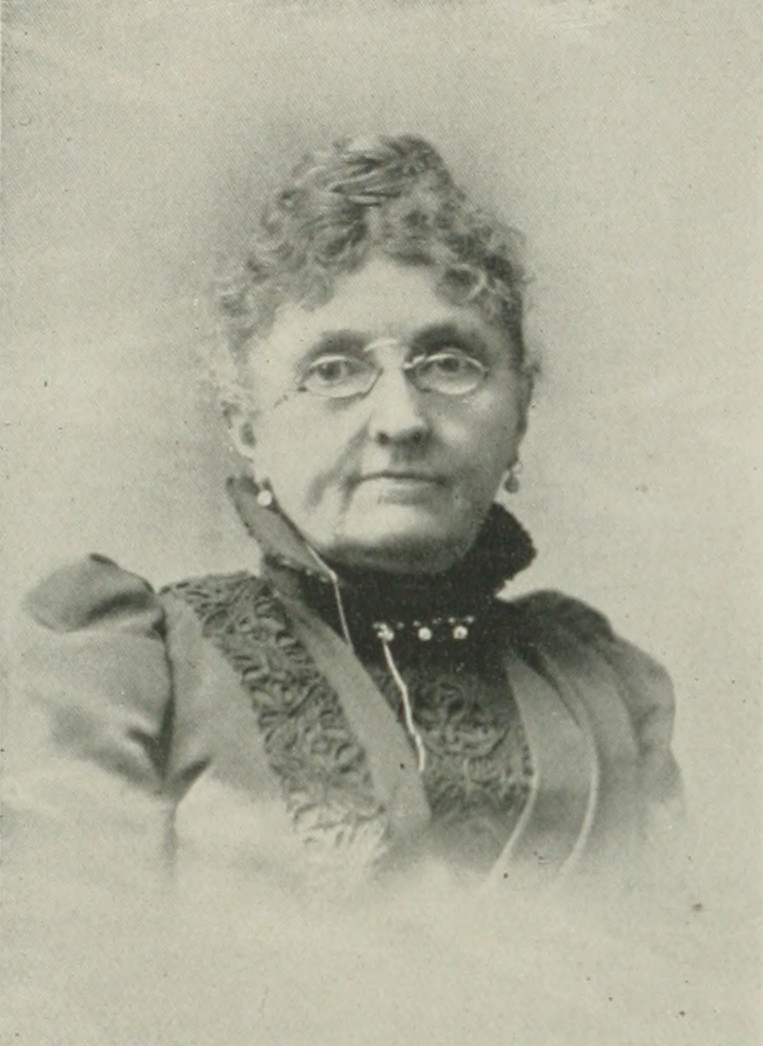

Second Lady of the United States
- In role March 4, 1885 – November 25, 1885
- Vice President: Thomas A. Hendricks
- Preceded by: Ellen Colfax
- Succeeded by: Anna Morton

First Lady of Indiana
- In role January 13, 1873 – January 8, 1877
- Governor: Thomas Hendricks
- Preceded by: Matilda Baker
- Succeeded by: Nancy Williams

Personal details
- Born: Eliza Carol Morgan; November 23, 1823 North Bend, Ohio, U.S.
- Died: November 3, 1903 (aged 79) Indianapolis, Indiana, U.S.
- Resting place: Crown Hill Cemetery and Arboretum, Section 29, Lot 2; 39.8171863°N 86.1712459°W
- Spouse: Thomas Hendricks (m. 1845; died 1885)
- Children: 1

Eliza Carol Hendricks (née Morgan; November 23, 1823 – November 3, 1903) was the wife of Vice President Thomas A. Hendricks. She was the second lady of the United States from March to November 1885. She served as first lady of Indiana (1873–1877).

== Biography ==
Her father was Hon. Isaac Morgan. The love of nature, which was one of Mrs. Hendricks' characteristics, was fostered by her early surroundings. The large and attractive homestead, in which she first saw the light, adjoined that of Gen. William Henry Harrison, and both dwellings were noted for their fine outlook. Mrs. Hendricks was connected with some of the leading families of Cincinnati, and it was in that city she made her debut in the social world.

She married Thomas A. Hendricks on September 26, 1845, after a two-year courtship and had one son, Morgan, who died at age three. The couple met when Eliza was visiting her married sister, Mrs. Elizabeth Morgan West, in Shelbyville.

Mrs. Hendricks was a native of North Bend, Ohio, having been born there in 1823, and since that time she had resided in Indiana. Her first Hoosier home was in Shelbyville, in which place her husband was then engaged in the practice of law. They removed to Indianapolis in 1860, where he practiced for some years as a member of the law firm of Hendricks, Hord & Hendricks.

Mrs. Hendricks was fond of domestic life and was the administrator of the household, saving her husband from all unnecessary annoyance or responsibility, and in many other ways she was his true help-mate. Her husband depended much upon her judgment. Often, while an occupant of the gubernatorial chair when perplexed over applications for the pardon of criminals, did he call her into the conference, in order to avail himself of her intuitive perception of the merits of the case.

Hendricks had a passion for nature and pets, especially horses. Contemporaries noticed her talent for horse evaluation, and she always selected carriage horses for her household.

Upon her husband's inauguration Mrs. Hendricks became the 12th Second Lady (wife of the 21st Vice President) of the United States. Her husband, who had been in poor health for several years, served as vice president during the last eight months of his life, from his inauguration on March 4 until his death on November 25, 1885. The vice presidency remained vacant after Hendricks's death until Levi P. Morton assumed office in 1889. There is little to nothing written about her time as the Second Lady of the United States.

Mrs. Hendricks was not only the light of her husband's home life, but, wherever his official duties called him, he was accompanied by her, and when he twice visited the Old World, in quest of health, she was his faithful companion. The great sorrow of her life was his death, which occurred in November, 1885. Thomas A. Hendricks died unexpectedly of a heart attack on November 25, 1885, during a trip home to Indianapolis. He complained of feeling ill the morning of November 24, went to bed early, and died in his sleep the following day. Thomas Hendricks only served as vice president for about eight months, from March 4, 1885, until his death on November 25, 1885, in Indianapolis.

After her husband's death she had sought relief from grief and loneliness in a quickening of activities, especially in the lines of charity. Her most prominent philanthropic work was her persevering efforts, with other earnest women, to establish a "Prison for Women and Reform School for Girls". In answer to earnest and persistent solicitation on their part, the State Legislature made an appropriation, and in 1883 the building was erected. That institution had, from its beginning, been under the entire control and management of women. For some years it was the only one of its kind in the country. Mrs. Hendricks had, from its beginning, been the president of its board of managers.

Mrs. Hendricks was described as "generous, wise and discreet". She died on November 3, 1903, twenty days before what would have been her 80th birthday, in Indianapolis after being paralyzed for three weeks. She was buried with her husband at Crown Hill Cemetery Indianapolis, Indiana.

== Sources ==
- Gray, Ralph, ed. (1977). "Thomas A. Hendricks: Spokesman for the Democracy". Gentlemen from Indiana: National Party Candidates, 1836-1940. 50. Indianapolis: Indiana Historical Bureau: 117–139.
- Gugin, Linda C.; St. Clair, James E., eds. (2006). The Governors of Indiana. Indianapolis: Indiana Historical Society Press. ISBN 0-87195-196-7.
- Holcombe, John W.; Skinner, Hubert M. (1886). Life and Public Services of Thomas A. Hendricks. Indianapolis: Carlon and Hollenbeck.

Honorary titles
| Preceded by Matilda Baker | First Lady of Indiana; 1873–1877 | Succeeded by Nancy Williams |
| Vacant Title last held by Ellen Colfax | Second Lady of the United States; 1885 | Vacant Title next held by Anna Morton |
