= Evelyn Clark Colfax =

Second Lady of the United States

- Born: Evelyn Clark; 1823; Argyle, New York, U.S.
- Died: July 10, 1863 (aged 39–40); Newport, Rhode Island, U.S.
- Resting place: South Bend City Cemetery
- Spouse: Schuyler Colfax (m. 1844)
- Relatives: Ebenezer Clark (grandfather)

Evelyn Clark Colfax (née Clark; 1823 – July 10, 1863) was the first wife of Schuyler Colfax, an American politician who later became Speaker of the House of Representatives and Vice President of the United States serving as the first vice president of Ulysses S. Grant.

She was the daughter of Col. Ralph Clark and the granddaughter of Ebenezer Clark, who was elected to the 1st New York State Legislature and then the 2nd, 12th, 13th, 15th, and 20-25th state legislatures.

On October 10, 1844, Evelyn married her childhood friend Schuyler Colfax at her family home in Argyle, which was officiated by the Rev. Joel Wood. They then moved to South Bend, Indiana. Schuyler and Evelyn had no children during the marriage and for several years before her death, she suffered from poor health.

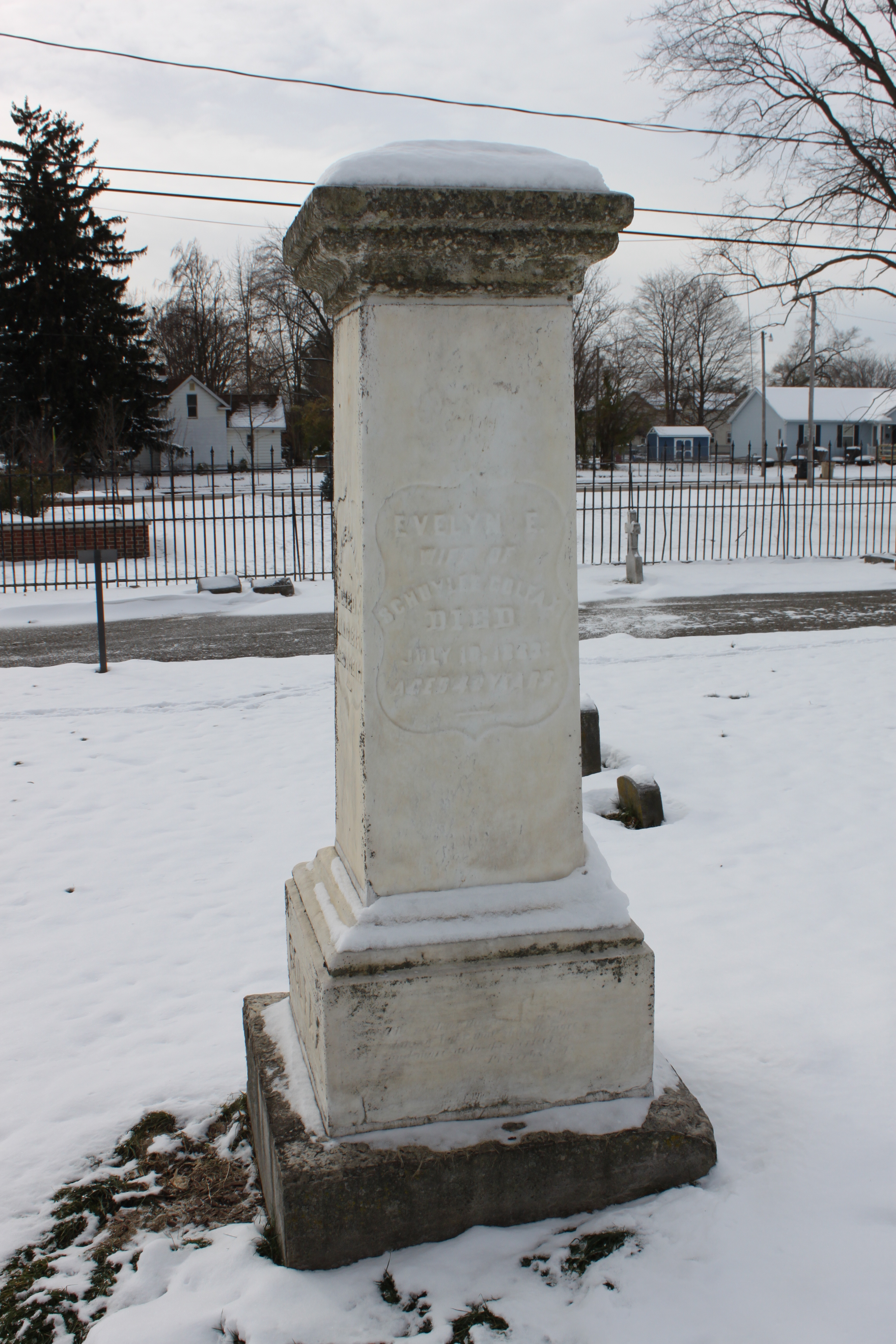
Grave of Colfax in South Bend City Cemetery

She was buried at City Cemetery in South Bend, Indiana near her husband Schuyler. The inscription on her grave reads, "The path of the just shineth more and more unto the perfect day."
