= Charles W. Cathcart =

American politician

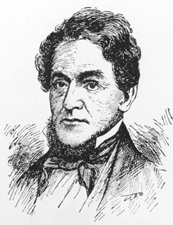

United States Senator from Indiana
- In office December 6, 1852 – January 18, 1853
- Appointed by: Joseph A. Wright
- Preceded by: James Whitcomb
- Succeeded by: John Pettit

Member of the United States House of Representatives from Indiana's 9th district
- In office March 4, 1845 – March 3, 1849
- Preceded by: Samuel C. Sample
- Succeeded by: Graham N. Fitch

Member of the Indiana Senate
- In office 1837–1840

Personal details
- Born: Charles William Cathcart; July 24, 1809 Funchal, Kingdom of Portugal
- Died: August 22, 1888 (aged 79) La Porte, Indiana
- Resting place: Pine Lake Cemetery
- Party: Democratic

Charles William Cathcart (July 24, 1809 – August 22, 1888) was a 19th-century American politician who was both a United States representative and senator from Indiana.

== Biography ==
He was born in Funchal, Madeira Island, Portugal where his father, James Leander Cathcart was the United States Consul. He travelled to Spain with his parents, attended private schools, and returned to the United States in 1819 and went to sea.

=== Career ===
He moved to Washington, D.C., in 1830, and was a clerk in the United States General Land Office. He moved to Indiana and was justice of the peace at New Durham Township in 1833. He engaged in agricultural pursuits near La Porte in 1837, was a United States land surveyor, and was a member of the Indiana Senate from 1837 to 1840.

=== Congress ===
Cathcart was elected as a Democrat to the Twenty-ninth and Thirtieth Congresses, serving from March 4, 1845, to March 3, 1849; he was appointed to the U.S. Senate to fill the vacancy caused by the death of James Whitcomb and served from December 6, 1852, to January 18, 1853. He was an unsuccessful candidate for election in 1860 to the Thirty-seventh Congress and engaged in agricultural pursuits.

=== Death and burial ===
He died on his farm near La Porte in 1888 and was interred in Pine Lake Cemetery.

U.S. House of Representatives
Preceded by Samuel C. Sample	U.S. Congressman, Indiana's 9th district 1845–1849	Succeeded by Graham N. Fitch
U.S. Senate
Preceded by James Whitcomb	U.S. senator (Class 3) from Indiana; 1852–1853; Served alongside: Jesse D. Bright	Succeeded by John Pettit
