= Enoch R. Weiss =

American military person (1848–1917)

- Born: February 13, 1848; Kosciusko County, Indiana, U.S.
- Died: December 29, 1917 (aged 69); South Bend, Indiana, U.S.
- Burial place: South Bend City Cemetery; South Bend, Indiana, U.S.
- Spouse: Ida R. Foegley (m. 1880; died 1911)
- Children: 5
- Military career
- Allegiance: United States
- Branch: United States Army
- Rank: Private
- Unit: 1st Cavalry
- Conflicts: American Indian Wars
- Awards: United States Medal of Honor

Enoch R. Weiss (February 13, 1848 – December 29, 1917) was a United States Medal of Honor recipient from Indiana.

== Early life ==
Enoch R. Weiss was born on February 13, 1848, in Kosciusko County, Indiana.

== Career ==
Weiss served as a private in Company G, 1st Cavalry, United States Army. He received a Medal of Honor for "gallantry in action with Indians" in the Chiricahua Mountains in the Arizona Territory on October 20, 1869. He received the Medal of Honor on February 14, 1870.

== Personal life ==
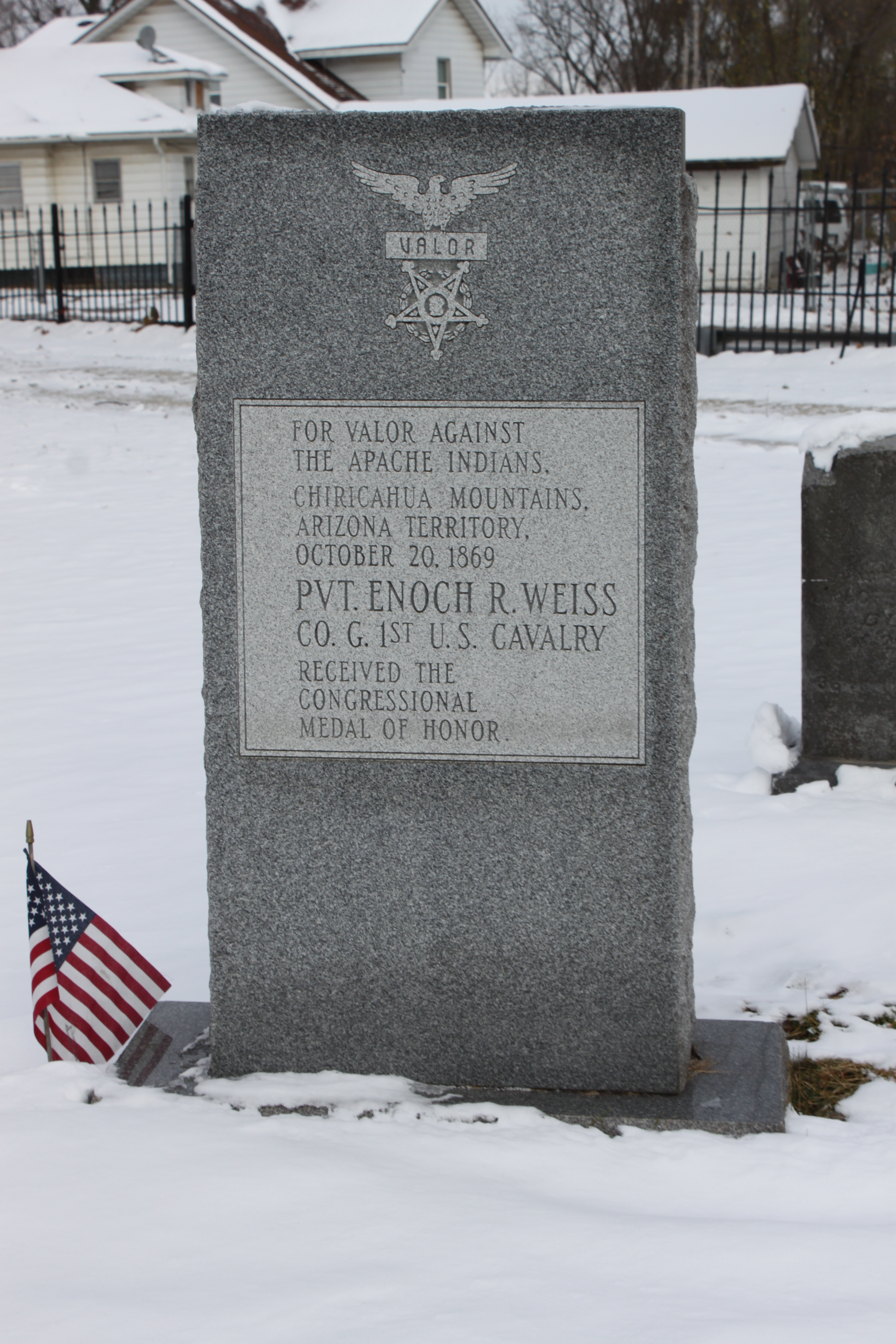
Grave of Weiss in South Bend City Cemetery

Weiss married Ida R. Foegley on June 17, 1880. They had three daughters and two sons, Mary, Emma, Dorothy, Harry and Bert. His wife died on July 19, 1911.

Weiss died on December 29, 1917, in South Bend, Indiana. He was buried at South Bend City Cemetery.
