= 48th Indiana Infantry Regiment =

48th Regiment Indiana Infantry
- Active: December 5, 1861 – July 15, 1865
- Country: United States
- Allegiance: Union
- Branch: Infantry
- Engagements: Siege of Corinth; Battle of Iuka; Second Battle of Corinth; Yazoo Pass Expedition; Battle of Port Gibson (reserves); Battle of Raymond; Battle of Champion Hill; Siege of Vicksburg, May 19 & May 22 assaults Chattanooga campaign Battle of Missionary Ridge; Sherman's March to the Sea; Carolinas campaign Battle of Bentonville

The 48th Regiment Indiana Infantry was an infantry regiment that served in the Union Army during the American Civil War.

== Service ==
The 48th Indiana Infantry was organized at Goshen, Indiana December 5, 1861, through January 28, 1862, and mustered in for a three-year enlistment under the command of Colonel Norman Eddy.

The regiment was attached to District of Paducah, Kentucky, to May 1862. 2nd Brigade, 3rd Division, Army of the Mississippi, May 1862. 1st Brigade, 3rd Division, Army of the Mississippi, to November 1862. 1st Brigade, 7th Division, Left Wing, XIII Corps, Department of the Tennessee, to December 1862. 1st Brigade, 7th Division, XVI Corps, to January 1863. 1st Brigade, 7th Division, XVII Corps, to September 1863. 1st Brigade, 2nd Division, XVII Corps, to December 1863. 1st Brigade, 3rd Division, XV Corps, to April 1865. 2nd Brigade, 4th Division, XV Corps, to July 1865.

The 48th Indiana Infantry mustered out of service July 15, 1865, at Louisville, Kentucky.

== Detailed service ==
The regiment left for Fort Donelson on Feb. 1, arriving the day after the surrender. It moved to Paducah then to the Tennessee River, and participated in the Siege of Corinth. After the evacuation the regiment was assigned to the 1st Brigade, 2nd Division, Army of the Mississippi, and took part in the pursuit of Price's forces. It was in the Battle of Iuka, losing 116 in killed and wounded; was under Rosecrans in the Second Battle of Corinth in October; then moved to Oxford and back to Memphis, where in January 1863, it was assigned to the 1st Brigade, 7th Division, XVII Army Corps. It moved to the rear of Vicksburg in March, participated in engagements at Forty Hills, Raymond, Jackson, and Champion Hill, losing 33 killed and wounded in the last engagement. It was in the trenches before Vicksburg and took part in the assault of May 22, losing 38 in killed and wounded. It moved to Memphis in August, then to Chattanooga and was engaged at Tunnel Hill. At Huntsville, Alabama, it reenlisted as a veteran organization in January 1864, and after enjoying a furlough, returned to Huntsville in March. It moved to Cartersville, Georgia, in June, hunting guerrillas and protecting railroad communications, and then joined the army at Atlanta. It marched to Savannah with the 1st Brigade, 3rd Division, XV Corps, then moved to Beaufort, South Carolina, participated in the Campaign of the Carolinas to Raleigh, North Carolina, and after Johnston's surrender marched to Washington, D.C. It was then transferred to Louisville, Kentucky and mustered out July 15, 1865. While at Washington, the regiment received 250 recruits from the 12th, 83rd, 97th and 99th Infantry Regiments, whose terms had not expired at the time of the muster out of these organizations, and these were discharged with the 48th.

== Casualties ==
The original strength of the regiment was 991; gain by recruits, 603; re-enlistments, 284; total, 1,878. Loss by death, 213; desertion, 96; unaccounted for, 199.

== Commanders ==
- Colonel Norman Eddy - resigned June 1863 due to wounds received at the Battle of Iuka
- Lieutenant Colonel Edward Jesup Wood
- Captain Newton Bingham - commanded during the Carolinas Campaign

== See also ==
- List of Indiana Civil War regiments
- Indiana in the Civil War
