= Graham N. Fitch =

Union Army officer and politician

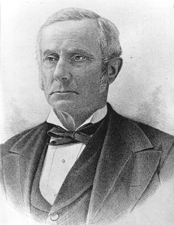

United States Senator from Indiana
- In office February 4, 1857 – March 3, 1861
- Preceded by: John Pettit
- Succeeded by: Henry S. Lane

Member of the U. S. House of Representatives from Indiana's 9th district
- In office March 4, 1849 – March 3, 1853
- Preceded by: Charles W. Cathcart
- Succeeded by: Norman Eddy

Member of the Indiana House of Representatives
- In office 1836; 1839

Personal details
- Born: Graham Newell Fitch; December 5, 1809 Le Roy, New York
- Died: November 29, 1892 (aged 82) Logansport, Indiana
- Party: Democratic

Graham Newell Fitch (December 5, 1809 – November 29, 1892) was a 19th-century United States representative and senator from Indiana, as well as a brigade commander in the Union Army during the American Civil War.

== Early life and career ==
Born in Le Roy, New York, he attended Middlebury Academy and Geneva College. He studied medicine and completed his medical course at the College of Physicians and Surgeons, and commenced practice in Logansport, Indiana, in 1834. He was a member of the Indiana House of Representatives in 1836 and 1839 and was a professor of anatomy at the Rush Medical College in Chicago from 1844 to 1848, and at the Indianapolis Medical College in 1878.

== Congress ==
Fitch was elected as a Democrat to the Thirty-first and Thirty-second congresses, from March 4, 1849, to March 3, 1853.

He was not a candidate for renomination in 1852 and resumed the practice of medicine.

=== U.S. Senate ===
He was elected to the U.S. Senate to fill a vacancy in the term beginning March 4, 1855, and sat from February 4, 1857, to March 3, 1861. He was not a candidate for reelection in 1860. While in the Senate, he was chairman of the Committee on Printing (Thirty-fifth and Thirty-sixth Congresses).

== Civil War service ==
After the Civil War erupted and President Abraham Lincoln called for 100,000 volunteers to put down the rebellion, Fitch raised the 46th Indiana Infantry. He was its colonel before being promoted to command of a brigade.

During the battles of New Madrid and Island Number Ten, Fitch commanded the 2nd Brigade of Brigadier General John M. Palmer's infantry division. He also participated in the capture of Fort Pillow and Memphis. Fitch later commanded the Union infantry forces at Saint Charles in Arkansas.

In late 1862 he resigned his commission because of injuries received in action.

Fitch returned home and resumed the practice of medicine in Logansport.

== Death and burial ==
He died there in 1892 and was buried in Mount Hope Cemetery.

== Family ==
Edwin Denby, Fitch's grandson, was a U.S. representative from Michigan and Secretary of the Navy.

U.S. House of Representatives
Preceded by Charles W. Cathcart	U.S. Representative, Indiana 9th district 1849–1853	Succeeded by Norman Eddy
U.S. Senate
Preceded by John Pettit	U.S. senator (Class 3) from Indiana; 1857–1861; Served alongside: Jesse D. Bright	Succeeded by Henry S. Lane
