= Schuyler Colfax III =

American politician (1870–1925)

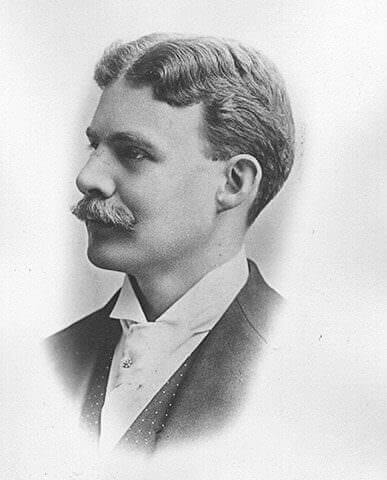

11th Mayor of South Bend, Indiana
- In office 1898–1902
- Preceded by: D. B. J. Schafer
- Succeeded by: Edward J. Fogarty

Personal details
- Born: April 11, 1870 Washington, D.C., U.S.
- Died: March 29, 1925 (aged 54) Rochester, New York, U.S.
- Resting place: South Bend City Cemetery; South Bend, Indiana, U.S.
- Party: Republican
- Spouse: Catherine Elizabeth Nelson
- Children: 3
- Parent(s): Schuyler Colfax; Ellen Maria Wade
- Profession: Businessman

Schuyler Colfax III (/ˈskaɪlər ˈkoʊlfæks/; April 11, 1870 – March 29, 1925) was an American Republican politician who served as the 11th mayor of South Bend, Indiana from 1898 to 1902. He assumed office at the age of 28, and remains the youngest person to become mayor in the city's history.

Colfax was the son of Schuyler Colfax, the 17th Vice President of the United States and 25th Speaker of the House of Representatives.

== Background and political career ==
Born in Washington, D.C. in 1870, Colfax was the son of Schuyler Colfax and Ellen Maria (Ella) Wade, a niece of Senator Benjamin Wade. He was born shortly after his father began his term as vice president.

Colfax was educated in the public schools of South Bend and the Lawrenceville School. He began a business career as head of Colfax Manufacturing, a company that built and sold pony carts.

As Mayor of South Bend, Colfax oversaw the building of the Ballpark Synagogue building and the Potawatomi Zoo, the oldest zoo in Indiana.

In 1906, Colfax moved to Columbus, Ohio to take charge of the Aurora Photographic Paper Company. When the company was sold to Kodak, Colfax and his family moved to Rochester, New York, where Colfax was head of Kodak's cinematographic sales department. He later moved to northern New Jersey, where he ran a chemical manufacturing business.

Colfax volunteered for military service during World War I. He was appointed to the staff of the New York National Guard's adjutant general as inspector of small arms practice with the rank of major. He was discharged from the National Guard at the end of the war.

== Family and death ==
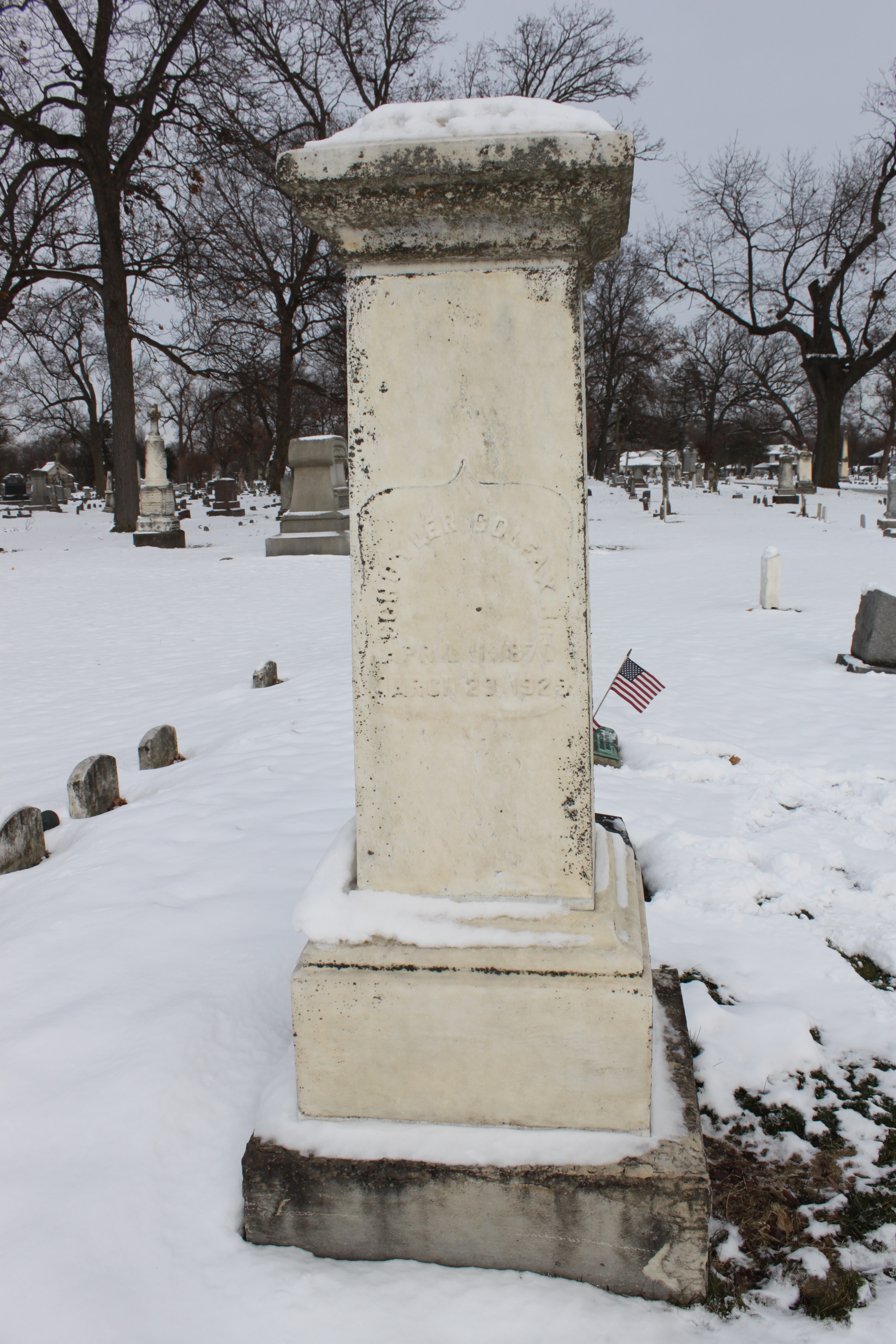
Grave of Colfax in South Bend City Cemetery

In 1895, Colfax married Catherine Elizabeth Nelson. They had three daughters.

Colfax died in 1925 and is buried at the City Cemetery in South Bend.
