= Nicholas Dinkel =

American football player (1874–1919)

Notre Dame Fighting Irish
- Positions: End, Quarterback

Personal information
- Born: May 12, 1874; Springfield, Ohio, U.S.
- Died: May 14, 1919 (aged 45); Cincinnati, Ohio, U.S.

Career information
- College: Notre Dame (1892–1894)

Nicholas Stephen Dinkel (May 12, 1874 – May 14, 1919) was an American college football player and a starting quarterback for the University of Notre Dame.

Dinkel played his first two years with the Notre Dame football team at the right end position. But during his senior season in 1894, new head coach James L. Morison installed an offense based upon speed running to the outside. Seeking to capitalize on this philosophy, Dinkel swapped positions with then-Irish quarterback Charles Zeitler and led the team from under center.

Dinkel's team achieved easy victories over Hillsdale, Wabash and Rush Medical, but struggled to a 0-1-1 mark in a home-and-home series with Albion, thus finishing the year at 3–1–1.

After graduating, Dinkel returned to his home in Springfield, Ohio, where in 1896 he was involved in a controversial 24–6 victory by Wittenberg College over Ohio State: Allegedly, Dinkel was not enrolled at Wittenberg but merely played for them as a "ringer" at right tackle.

Shortly thereafter, Dinkel moved to Cincinnati, Ohio, where he worked as a salesman until his death from heart disease in 1919.
