= Samuel C. Sample =

American attorney and politician (1796–1855)

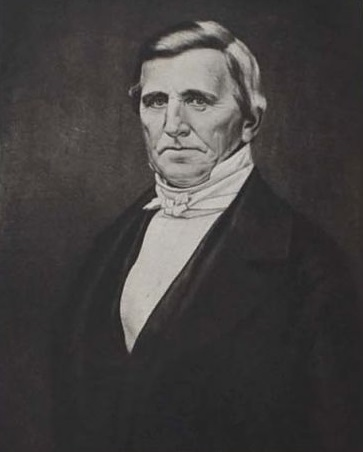
- Reproduction of portrait by Curran Swaim, circa 1855

Member of the U.S. House of Representatives from Indiana's 9th district
- In office March 4, 1843 – March 3, 1845
- Preceded by: District established
- Succeeded by: Charles W. Cathcart

Personal details
- Born: Samuel Caldwell Sample; August 15, 1796 Elkton, Maryland, U.S.
- Died: December 2, 1855 (aged 59) South Bend, Indiana, U.S.
- Resting place: South Bend City Cemetery; South Bend, Indiana, U.S.
- Party: Whig
- Spouse: Ann Howard
- Occupation: Lawyer; politician; judge; carpenter

Samuel Caldwell Sample (August 15, 1796 – December 2, 1855) was an American lawyer and politician who served a single term as a United States representative from Indiana from 1843 to 1845.

== Early life ==
Sample Caldwell Sample was born in Elkton, Maryland, to John Sample. His father was a captain serving under Thomas Veazey in the War of 1812. Sample attended a rural school. He learned to become a carpenter and assisted his father in his contracting business. Around 1823 he moved with his father to Connersville, Indiana. He studied law there and was admitted to the bar in 1833.

== Career ==
After being admitted to the bar, he began practicing law in South Bend, Indiana. In 1834 he was elected prosecuting attorney and subsequently elected judge of the ninth judicial circuit in 1836. He served as judge until he resigned in 1843. He also served as the first president of the First National Bank of South Bend.

=== Political career ===
He was elected to the 28th United States Congress as a Whig where he served from 1843 to 1845, the first representative from Indiana's 9th congressional district. He was defeated for reelection in 1844 by Charles W. Cathcart.

=== Later career ===
After his defeat from Congress, he returned to South Bend, where he resumed practicing law until his death.

== Personal life ==
Sample married Ann Howard of Elkton.

== Death and burial ==
Sample died on December 2, 1855, at his home in South Bend. He was buried at City Cemetery in South Bend.

U.S. House of Representatives
Preceded by Not Applicable	U.S. Congressman, Indiana 9th district 1843-1845	Succeeded by Charles W. Cathcart
