= Emmy Dinkel-Keet =

Dutch artist

- Born: Emmy Gerarda Mary Keet; 5 September 1908; The Hague, Netherlands
- Died: 27 January 2003 (aged 94); Cheltenham, England
- Education: Southend College of Art; Royal College of Art
- Known for: Painting
- Spouse: Ernest Michael Dinkel m.1941-1983, his death

Emmy Gerarda Mary Dinkel-Keet (née Keet; 5 September 1908 – 27 January 2003) was a Dutch artist, known for her drawings and watercolour paintings, who spent the majority of her career in Britain.

== Biography ==
Born in The Hague in 1908, Dinkel-Keet and her family moved to England during World War I. Settling in Essex, Dinkel-Keet won a scholarship to the Southend College of Art, where she studied between 1927 and 1930. From 1930 to 1933, Dinkel-Keet was a student at the Royal College of Art in London where her tutors included both Eric Ravilious and Edward Bawden. After graduating from the Royal College, Dinkel-Keet spent time in Hungary studying peasant art and design, including embroidery. On returning to Britain she took a series of teaching posts, initially with the London County Council, then at Sherborne School for Girls and from 1939 at the College of Art in Great Malvern. After she married the artist Ernest Dinkel, the couple moved to Scotland where Dinkel-Keet took further teaching posts after raising a family. Throughout her career she was a regular exhibitor at the Royal Academy in London and, later, with the Royal Scottish Academy. After Ernest Dinkel retired from his post at the Edinburgh College of Art, the couple moved to Bussage near Stroud in Gloucestershire where Dinkel-Keet spent more time on her art. She illustrated a number of books often creating fine illustrations using a paint brush with only a single hair. In 1984 Dinkel-Keet and her husband had a joint exhibition at Stroud and in 1987 Dinkel-Keet was elected a member of the Royal West of England Academy. In 1991, a volume of her paintings and drawings, Dream Children: Collected Works of Emmy Dinkel-Keet was published.
