= Clement Studebaker Jr. =

American businessman (1871–1932)

- Born: August 11, 1871; South Bend, Indiana, U.S.
- Died: December 2, 1932 (aged 61); Chicago, Illinois, U.S.
- Resting place: South Bend City Cemetery; South Bend, Indiana, U.S.
- Occupation: Businessman
- Spouse: Alice Rhawn (m. 1893)
- Children: 2
- Parent: Clement Studebaker

Clement Studebaker Jr. (August 11, 1871 – December 3, 1932) was an American businessman and the son of wagon, carriage and automobile manufacturer Clement Studebaker. He held executive positions in the family's automobile business, Studebaker Corporation, and later became the president and chairman of several other important companies.

== Early life ==
Clement Studebaker Jr. was born on August 11, 1871, in South Bend, Indiana, to Clement Studebaker.

== Career ==
According to Albert Russel Erskine, young Clement served an apprenticeship with Studebaker, working in several departments and rising to a board position and treasurer. He is elsewhere recorded as having been the E-M-F company's vice-president, presumably after that company's take-over by Studebaker in 1910. By 1916, he had moved on to become president and chairman of the utility, North American Light and Power Company, the precursor of the North American Company.

At various times, he also served as president and chairman of the board of the Illinois Power and Light Company (and of its subsidiary, the Illinois Traction Company), and of the South Bend Watch Company, as well as treasurer of the Chicago South Shore and South Bend Railroad. Around 1920, Studebaker moved to Chicago.

== Death ==
Studebaker married Alice Rhawn of Philadelphia on April 27, 1893. They had two children, Clement Studebaker III (1894–1975), and Esther (1898–1989). After their marriage, they lived at Tippecanoe Place and South Scott Street in South Bend for a time. After moving to Chicago, they lived at a house on the corner of Jefferson Boulevard and Greenlawn Avenue.

Studebaker died of heart complications at his 1500 Lake Shore Drive home in Chicago on December 3, 1932. His body was shipped back to his hometown of South Bend, Indiana and buried at the family mausoleum in South Bend City Cemetery. Two wills were found, the first of which left his two-million dollar estate to, among others, several colleges. The second will, which superseded the first, left his fortune to his two children.
