= WETL =

High school radio station in South Bend, Indiana

- South Bend, Indiana; United States
- Frequency: 91.7 MHz
- Branding: The Mix 91.7

Programming
- Format: High school radio

Ownership
- Owner: South Bend Community School Corporation

History
- First air date: November 18, 1958

Technical information
- Licensing authority: FCC
- Facility ID: 60920
- Class: A
- ERP: 3,000 watts
- HAAT: 91 meters (299 ft)
- Transmitter coordinates: 41°37′24″N 86°14′15″W

Links
- Public license information: Public file; LMS
- Webcast: Listen Live
- Website: sbstvradio.org

WETL (91.7 FM) is a radio station licensed to serve the community of South Bend, Indiana, United States. The station is owned by the South Bend Community School Corporation and airs a high school radio format, with programming designed and hosted by high school students. The station is housed at James Whitcomb Riley High School. Students in any of the school corporation's four high schools can take a class in radio and TV broadcasting, which provides credit through Vincennes University.

== History ==
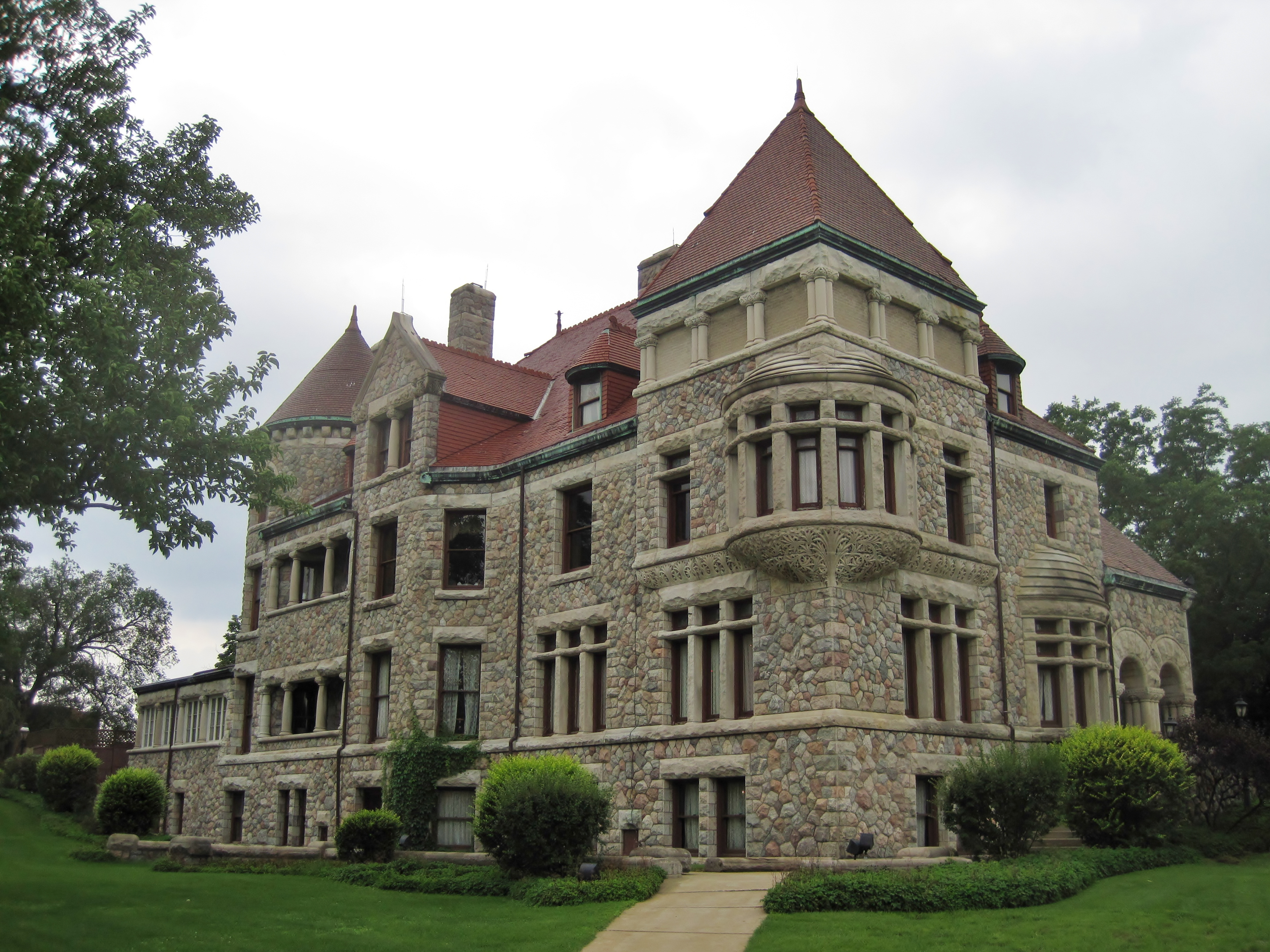
Tippecanoe Place, then the Morris School, was the first studio facility for WETL

On July 2, 1958, the School City of South Bend applied to the Federal Communications Commission (FCC) for a new FM radio station in South Bend. The construction permit was granted on September 3, but even before then, plans were made to put the station into use. School City had received a Ford Foundation grant to study the use of radio programming as part of an experiment in enlarged homeroom sizes at three of the district's high schools.

WETL began broadcasting on 91.9 MHz on November 18, 1958. Its six hours a day of programming nearly exclusively consisted of classes to be received by students. Programming originated from the Audio-Visual Center on the third floor of the then-Morris School (now Tippecanoe Place) the former home of Clement Studebaker; the radio station was located in the ballroom, while studios were converted from cedar closets that had once held furs. From the early days, student-produced programming also featured alongside the classes. The first school to get on the air was Riley High School; two students produced a 15-minute weekly magazine program on school happenings. After the first year of the program, it was successful enough that radio instruction was expanded from 1,200 to 4,200 students. In 1962, the station broadcast its first programs for a general audience with a series of classical music shows airing five nights a week. In 1969, school offices moved out of the Morris School into another former Studebaker building, and WETL also was relocated there.

In 1976, WETL moved from 91.9 to 91.7 MHz; this change was necessitated by an approved proposal to add an FM station allotment in Goshen, Indiana, that in turn moved WHPD in Dowagiac, Michigan, to 92.1 MHz. That forced WETL to move down a channel. In 1980, the station broadcast during the summer for the first time in order to maintain its license under new FCC rules that required more airtime and power of smaller noncommercial educational stations; by this time, its programming for general audiences included school board meetings and a daily opera.

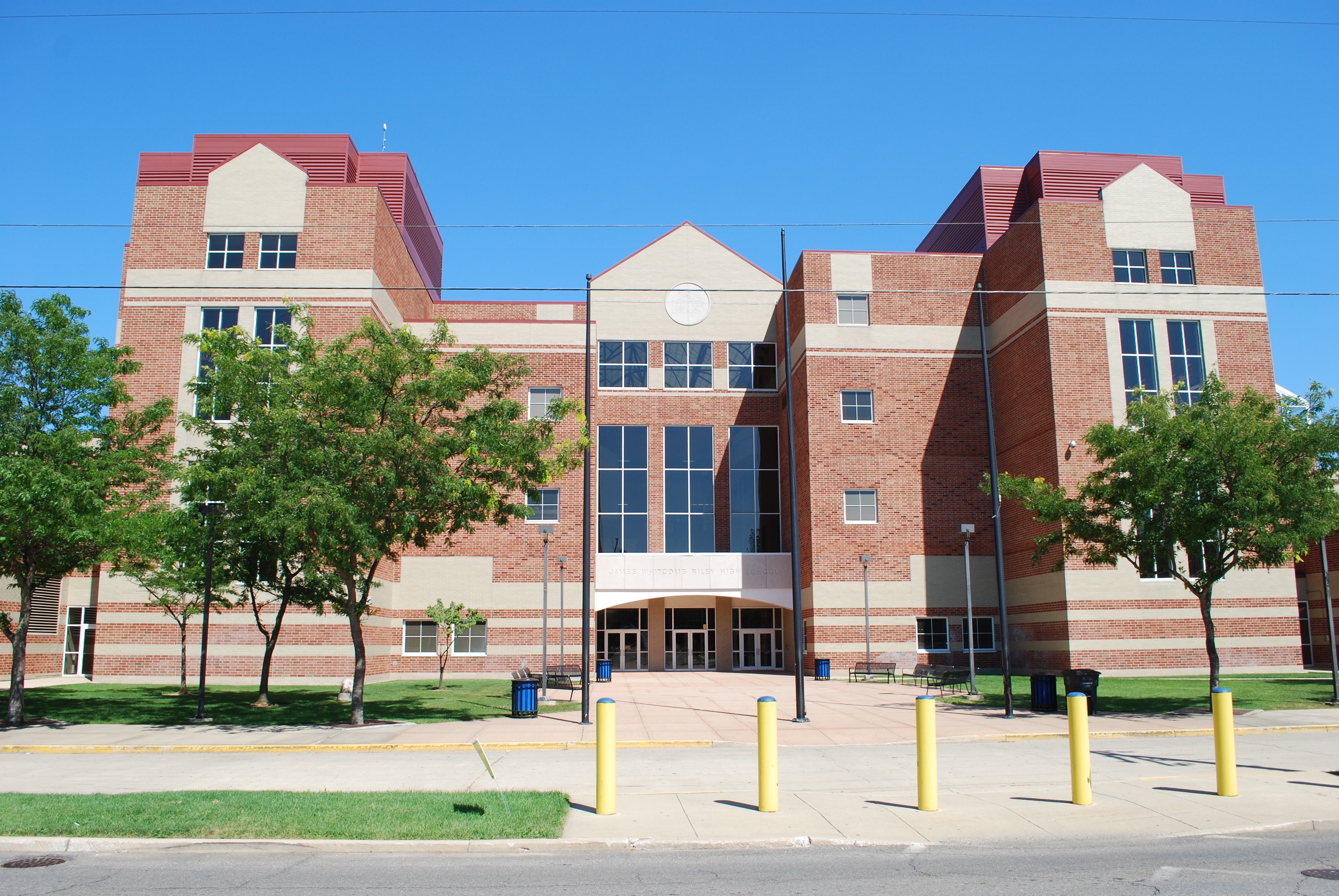
Since 2005, WETL's studios have been at James Whitcomb Riley High School

WETL transitioned to providing primarily daytime educational programming for elementary school students—including, for kindergarten students, the only art, music, and physical education material in their curriculum—and a training ground for high school DJs. Students from all of the South Bend corporation high schools and St. Joseph High School received class credit and were on the air at WETL. Each student selected the format and the music to play on their show; one student in 1996 did political commentaries, even if there was not much of an audience.

In 2005, WETL moved from the Education Center to Riley High School; it became a 24-hour station two years later.
