= Ashcraft v. Tennessee =

Ashcraft v. Tennessee may refer to:

- Ashcraft v. Tennessee (1944), 322 U.S. 143, reversing two convictions based on coerced confessions
- Ashcraft v. Tennessee (1946), 327 U.S. 274, reversing a conviction where the prosecution entered narrative evidence about an interrogation that was equivalent to an excluded confession
