= Courts of Louisiana =

Courts of Louisiana include:

State courts of Louisiana

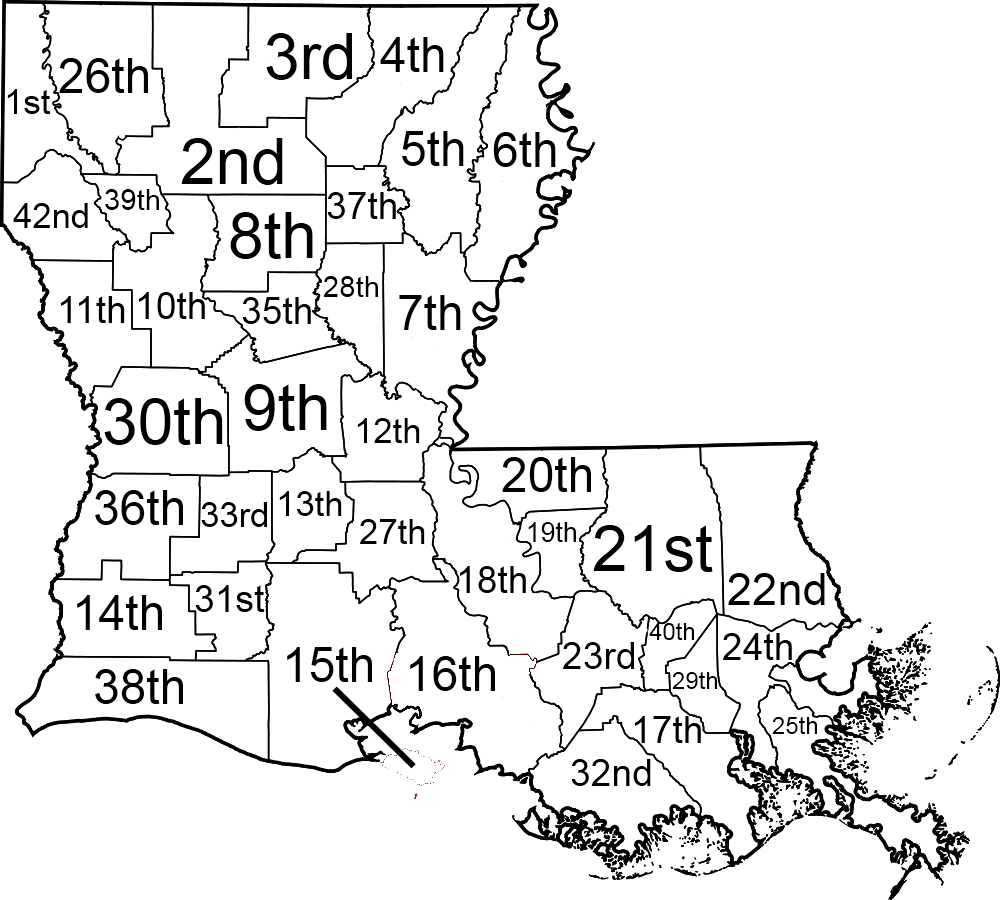
Louisiana judicial districts map

- Louisiana Supreme Court
  - Louisiana Circuit Courts of Appeal (5 circuits)
    - Louisiana District Courts (42 districts)

Federal courts located in Louisiana

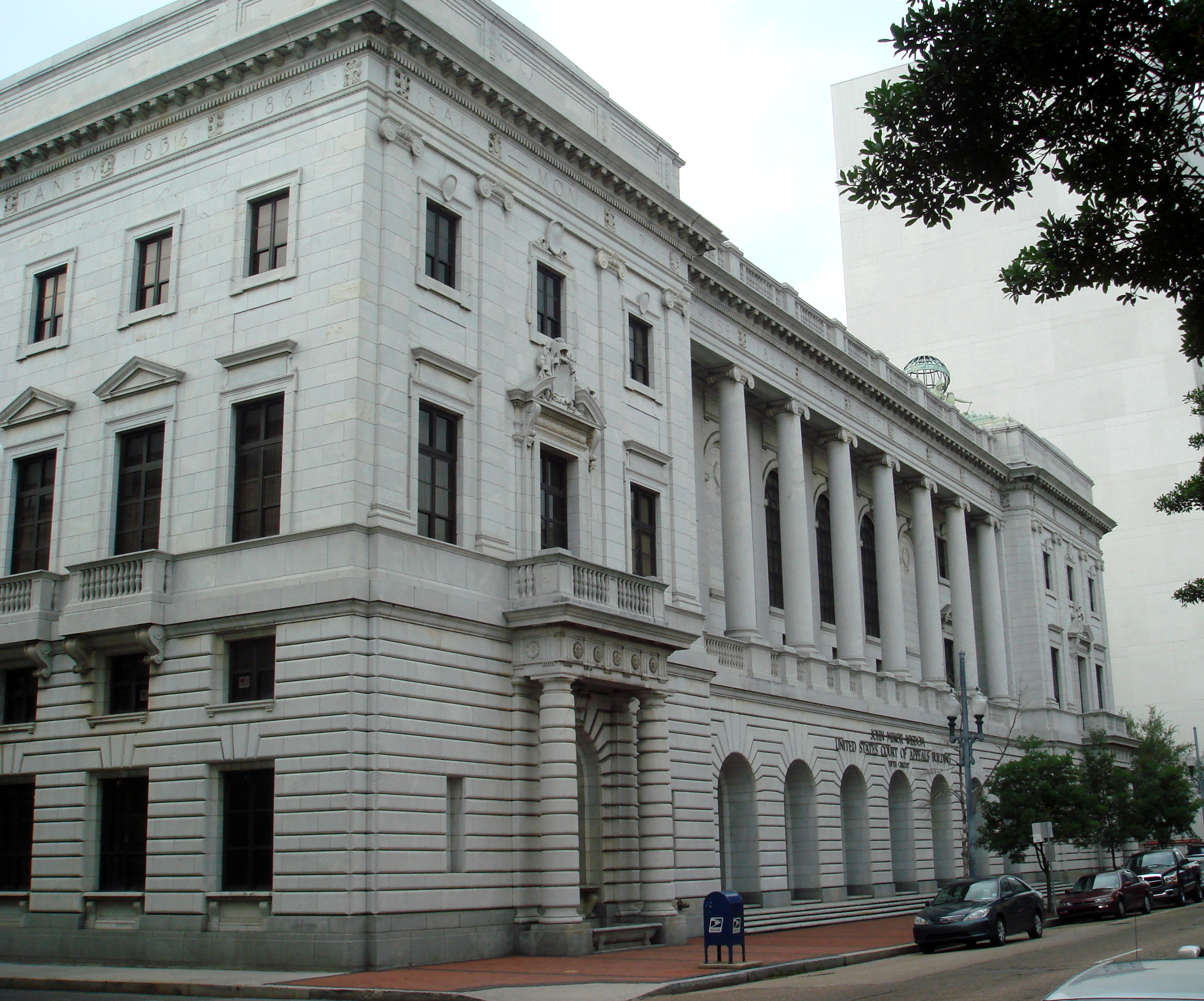
The John Minor Wisdom U.S. Courthouse, home of the United States Court of Appeals for the Fifth Circuit in New Orleans

- United States Court of Appeals for the Fifth Circuit (headquartered in New Orleans, Louisiana; having jurisdiction over the United States District Courts of Louisiana, Mississippi, and Texas)
- United States District Court for the Eastern District of Louisiana
- United States District Court for the Middle District of Louisiana
- United States District Court for the Western District of Louisiana

Former federal courts of Louisiana

- United States District Court for the District of Orleans (territorial court of the Territory of Orleans, extinct, abolished when Louisiana became a state on April 30, 1812)
- United States District Court for the District of Louisiana (extinct, subdivided)

Mayors Courts

There are 250 towns and villages in Louisiana with a mayor/magistrate court system in Louisiana.

Justice of the Peace Courts

There are approximately 390 justice of the peace courts in Louisiana with judicial authority of a ward or district elected to six year terms.

== See also ==
- Judiciary of Louisiana
