= Commissioner v. Wilcox =

- Supreme Court of the United States

Argued January 8, 1946 Decided February 25, 1946
- Full case name: Commissioner of Internal Revenue v. Wilcox, et al.
- Citations: 327 U.S. 404 (more) 66 S. Ct. 546; 90 L. Ed. 752; 1946 U.S. LEXIS 3084; 46-1 U.S. Tax Cas. (CCH) ¶ 9188; 34 A.F.T.R. (P-H) 811; 1946-1 C.B. 6; 166 A.L.R. 884; 1946 P.H. P72,014

Case history
- Prior: Certiorari to the Circuit Court of Appeals for the Ninth Circuit

Court membership
- Chief Justice Harlan F. Stone Associate Justices Hugo Black · Stanley F. Reed; Felix Frankfurter · William O. Douglas; Frank Murphy · Robert H. Jackson; Wiley B. Rutledge · Harold H. Burton

Case opinions
- Majority: Murphy, joined by Stone, Black, Reed, Frankfurter, Douglas, Rutledge
- Dissent: Burton
- Jackson took no part in the consideration or decision of the case.

Laws applied
- § 22 (a) of the Internal Revenue Code
- Overruled by
- James v. United States, 366 U.S. 213 (1961)

Commissioner v. Wilcox, 327 U.S. 404 (1946), was a case decided by the Supreme Court of the United States.

The issue presented in this case was whether embezzled money constituted taxable income to the embezzler under § 22(a) of the Internal Revenue Code of 1939.

Although the Court ruled that the embezzlement income was not taxable to the embezzler in Wilcox, the Court later overruled the decision in James v. United States.

== See also ==
- Taxation of illegal income in the United States
- List of United States Supreme Court cases, volume 327
