= North American Co. v. SEC =

North American Co. v. Securities and Exchange Commission
- Supreme Court of the United States

Argued November 15, 1945 Decided April 1, 1946
- Full case name: North American Co. v. Securities and Exchange Commission
- Citations: 327 U.S. 686 (more) 66 S. Ct. 785; 90 L. Ed. 945; 1946 U.S. LEXIS 2990

Case history
- Prior: 133 F.2d 148 (2d Cir. 1943); cert. granted, 318 U.S. 750 (1943).

Holding
- Order under the Public Utility Holding Company Act for holding company to divest companies other than a single integrated public utility system did not violate the Commerce Clause and Fifth Amendment.

Court membership
- Chief Justice Harlan F. Stone Associate Justices Hugo Black · Stanley F. Reed; Felix Frankfurter · William O. Douglas; Frank Murphy · Robert H. Jackson; Wiley B. Rutledge · Harold H. Burton

Case opinion
- Majority: Murphy, joined by Stone, Black, Frankfurter, Rutledge, Burton
- Douglas, Jackson, Reed took no part in the consideration or decision of the case.

Laws applied
- Public Utility Holding Company Act, 15 U.S.C. §§ 79 et seq.

North American Co. v. Securities and Exchange Commission, 327 U.S. 686 (1946), is a United States Supreme Court case holding that a Securities and Exchange Commission (SEC) order under the Public Utility Holding Company Act (PUHCA) directing a public utility holding company to divest its securities of all companies except for one electric company did not violate the Commerce Clause or the Fifth Amendment to the United States Constitution.

== Background ==
PUHCA was one of a number of trust-busting and securities regulation initiatives that were enacted in response to the Wall Street Crash of 1929 and ensuing Great Depression, including the collapse of Samuel Insull's public utility holding companies. By 1932, the eight largest utility holding companies controlled 73 percent of the investor-owned electric industry. Their complex, highly leveraged, corporate structures were very difficult for individual states to regulate. PUHCA required electric company holding companies to register with the SEC, and authorized the SEC to limit a holding company to a single integrated electric system through the divestiture of its other public utility and unrelated companies.

The North American Company, formed in 1890, was a holding company in a system that by 1940 contained 80 companies operating in seventeen states and the District of Columbia. These included the Union Electric Company, which operated an electric system around St. Louis, Missouri, and subsidiaries in Illinois and Iowa, the Washington Railway and Electric Company, and the North American Light and Power Company with systems in Kansas, Missouri, Illinois, and Iowa and its subsidiaries Cleveland Electric Illuminating Company, Pacific Gas and Electric, and Detroit Edison Company. In addition, North American also owned an investment trust company and West Kentucky Coal Company. Together the various electric systems served more than 3,000,000 customers in a service territory of 165,000 square miles.

North American initially challenged the constitutionality of PUHCA and requested an injunction against its enforcement, but the Supreme Court in Landis v. North American Co., held that the case was premature and that North American should register and then litigate the constitutionality of PUHCA after the SEC conducted its proceeding. North American then registered in 1937 as a holding company with the SEC, reserving its right to challenge the validity of the remaining portions of PUHCA. After initiating an administrative proceeding, the SEC issued an order requiring divestiture of North American's securities in companies other than the Union Electric Company. North American appealed, but in 1943 the Court of Appeals for the Second Circuit upheld the order. Arguing that ownership of securities was not interstate commerce within the meaning of the Commerce Clause and that the divestiture ordered by the SEC was a taking in violation of the Fifth Amendment, North American appealed to the Supreme Court, which granted certiorari.

== Opinion ==
The opinion by Justice Murphy first concluded that North American was engaged in interstate commerce and through its substantial stock ownership dominated its subsidiaries. The opinion then noted that North American's argument that PUHCA's divestiture provision was invalid because ownership of securities was not commerce had been previously rejected by the Court in the anti-trust case of Northern Securities Co. v. United States. Under its authority under the Commerce Clause, Congress could regulate to protect the freedom of interstate commerce using any means that were lawful and not prohibited by the Constitution. Under Northern Securities, Congress could deal with and affect the ownership of securities to protect the freedom of commerce, which it did in fashioning the divestiture remedy in PUHCA.

Lastly, the Court dismissed the takings argument, noting that Congress had weighed the benefit to shareholders of efficient, common management of diversified companies against the actual and potential harm to the public, investors, and consumers from the use of pooled investments, and determined that the economic advantages of a holding company atop an unintegrated, sprawling electric system were not commensurate with the resulting economic disadvantages. In addition, it was not clear that there would be a loss necessary for a takings claim under the Fifth Amendment. PUHCA does not require the dumping or forced liquidation of the securities on the market for cash, so the stock of the companies ordered divested could be distributed to the shareholders or sold under a plan that protects shareholder rights. The Court determined that it could not conclude that North American shareholders were disadvantaged by the operation of the divestiture provision of PUHCA.

Justices Reed, Douglas and Jackson did not participate in the consideration of the case. Although Chief Justice Stone had initially recused himself for a disclosed reason, but when he discovered that his disqualification plus those of the other justices would result in the lack of a quorum, he reversed his position.

== Subsequent events ==
PUHCA was repealed by the Energy Policy Act of 2005 effective February 8, 2006.

== See also ==
- List of United States Supreme Court cases, volume 327
- American Power and Light Company v. Securities and Exchange Commission
