= Hawaiian Organic Act =

Law annexing Hawaii as a U.S. territory

- Other short titles: Organic Act of 1900
- Long title: An Act to provide a government for the Territory of Hawaii.
- Enacted by: the 56th United States Congress
- Effective: April 30, 1900

Citations
- Public law: Pub. L. 56–339
- Statutes at Large: 31 Stat. 141

Legislative history
- Introduced in the Senate as S. 222 by Shelby Moore Cullom on December 18, 1899; Committee consideration by Senate Committee on Foreign Relations; Passed the Senate on March 1, 1900; Passed the House on April 6, 1900 (240–49); Reported by the joint conference committee on April 1900; agreed to by the Senate on April 25, 1900; House agreed to amendment on April 27, 1900 (); Signed into law by President William McKinley on April 30, 1900

Major amendments
- Hawaiian Homes Commission Act (1921)

United States Supreme Court cases
- Mankichi v. Hawaii (1903), Duncan v. Kahanamoku (1946)

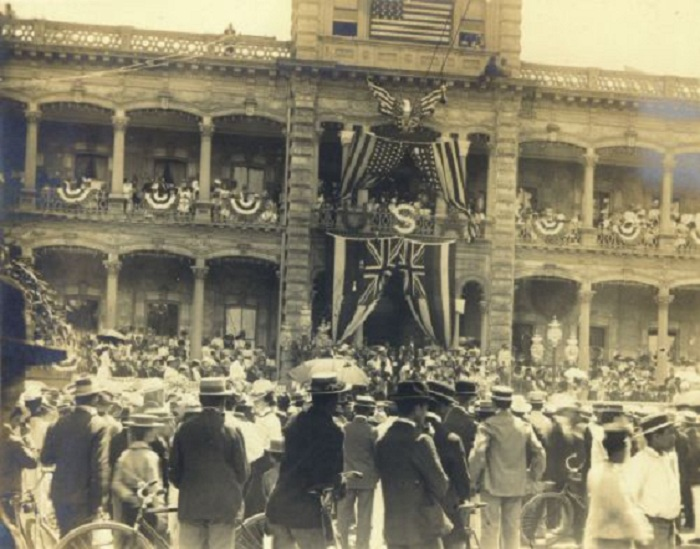
United States Admission Day ceremony of Hawaii in Iolani Palace, Honolulu, Hawaii, June 14, 1900

The Hawaiian Organic Act, Pub. L. 56–339, 31 Stat. 141, enacted April 30, 1900, was an organic act enacted by the United States Congress to establish the Territory of Hawaii and to provide a Constitution and government for the territory. The Act was replaced by the Hawaii Admission Act on August 21, 1959, when the territory was admitted to the United States as the State of Hawaii.

== Background ==
The Island of Hawaii was first inhabited by Polynesians who arrived in canoes and spread to the other Hawaiian islands. After contact by British explorer James Cook during his third voyage (1776–1780), the islands became well known and Europeans came and inhabited them. The French government was interested in the islands and wanted to establish Catholicism. The Hawaiian Kingdom became more influenced by the United States which set up trade relations with the Kingdom. After the overthrow of the Hawaiian Kingdom in 1893, the new Republic of Hawaii government lobbied for annexation by the United States. Annexation was approved by President William McKinley and Hawaii was incorporated as part of the territory of the United States on August 12, 1898, and then, in April 1900, organized as the Territory of Hawaii.

== General provisions ==
=== Capital ===
The Act stated that Honolulu, on Oahu, would be the capital of the Territory of Hawaii.

=== Citizenship ===
The Act stated that any person who was a citizen of the Republic of Hawaii on or before August 12, 1898 would also be a citizen of the United States, and any citizen of the United States who resided in the islands on or after August 12, 1898 would have to live there to become a citizen of the Territory of Hawaii.

=== Abolished offices ===
Certain offices that the Republic of Hawaii once supported would be abolished and replaced. For example, president, minister of foreign affairs, minister of the interior, minister of finance, minister of public instruction, auditor-general, deputy auditor-general, surveyor-general, marshal, and deputy marshal of the Republic of Hawaii.

=== Laws ===
All laws in effect in the Republic of Hawaii would continue. Suits would be under the name of the Territory of Hawaii. Finally, the act stated that any contracts made after August 12, 1898 would be nullified and terminated since they would no longer be legally binding according to the United States Congress.

Section 67 of the Act came under U.S. Supreme Court reference during World War II with regard to what martial law actually allowed, and more specifically, whether civilians could be tried by military courts. Section 67 derived from Article 31 of the Constitution of the Republic of Hawaii (1895), was suited for disloyal subjects at odds with the annexation; demonstrating how quickly political situations can change.

=== Elections ===
Elections would be held on the second Tuesday of November, but the governor could make a special request 30 days in advance for an earlier election.

=== Corruption ===
An office holder who takes bribes and subdues to any type of corruption will have voting rights repealed and will no longer be allowed to run for any governmental office, unless they are pardoned and civil rights are restored.

== Legislature of Hawaii ==
The law established a bicameral legislature, consisting of the Hawaii House of Representatives and the Hawaii Senate.

=== Members of the legislature ===
Members of either house will be paid $1,000 for each general session to which they attend. [Congress] is responsible for such payments from the United States Treasury. A bonus will be paid to any member who travels any distance for their general session of 20 cents per mile. A final bonus of $500 will be paid to any member who wishes to participate in any special session.

If a person from either house is assaulted, detained or harmed, the offenders will be fined or detained for a maximum of 30 days. This also applies if the person violates or threatens any member of any house.

Any member of the Senate or House of Representatives found guilty disorderly behavior or neglect of duty can be censured or impeached. Any member can be pardoned for any words that he may have said during a general session. Any member can also be pardoned of any crime while he is away on their respective house sessions, unless the crime includes any form of treason, felony, or breach of peace.

=== Hawaii Senate ===
The Senate initially consisted of 15 members with four-year terms. Sections 32 and 33 of the Organic Act of 1900 apportioned the senatorial districts as follows:

1. First District – The island of Hawai'i (4 senators).
2. Second District – The islands of Maui, Molokaʻi, Lānaʻi, and Kahoʻolawe (3 senators).
3. Third District – The island of O'ahu (6 senators).
4. Fourth District – The islands of Kaua'i and Ni'ihau (2 senators).

In 1956, the Organic Act was amended to increase the number of senators from 15 to 25 beginning after the 1958 general elections. Sections 32 and 33 of the amended Act apportioned the senatorial districts as follows:

1. First District – That portion of the island of Hawai'i known as Puna, Hilo, and Kamakua (5 senators).
2. Second District – That portion of the island of Hawai'i known as Kaʻū, Kona, and Kohala (2 senators).
3. Third District – The islands of Maui, Molokaʻi, Lānaʻi, and Kahoʻolawe (5 senators).
4. Fourth District - That portion of the island of O'ahu lying east and south of Nuuanu Street and Pali Road and the upper ridge of the Koolau Range from the Nuʻuanu Pali to Makapuu Point and all other islands not specifically enumerated (5 senators).
5. Fifth District - That portion of the island of O'ahu lying west and north of the fourth senatorial district (5 senators).
6. Sixth District - The islands of Kaua'i and Ni'ihau (3 senators).

When a member of the Senate died or resigned, a special election or a general election would be held to appoint a replacement. A senator of the Hawaiian Islands was required to be a citizen of the United States, be at least 30 years old, and have lived in Hawaii for at least three years. The original text, written in 1900, required that a senator "be a male citizen of the United States;" this gender requirement stood until 1922.

=== Hawaii House of Representatives ===
The House of Representatives initially consisted of 30 members with two-year terms. Sections 38 and 39 of the Organic Act of 1900 apportioned the representative districts as follows:

1. First District – That portion of the island of Hawai'i known as Puna, Hilo, and Kamakua (4 representatives).
2. Second District – That portion of the island of Hawai'i known as Kaʻū, Kona, and Kohala (4 representatives).
3. Third District - The islands of Maui, Molokaʻi, Lānaʻi, and Kahoʻolawe (6 representatives).
4. Fourth District - That portion of the island of O'ahu lying east and south of Nuuanu street and a line drawn in extension thereof from the Nuʻuanu Pali to Mokapu Point (6 representatives).
5. Fifth District - That portion of the island of O'ahu lying west and north of the fourth district (6 representatives).
6. Sixth District - The islands of Kaua'i and Ni'ihau (4 representatives).

In 1956, the Organic Act was amended to increase the number of representatives from 30 to 51 beginning after the 1958 general elections. Sections 38 and 39 of the amended Act apportioned the representative districts as follows:

1. First District – That portion of the island of Hawai'i known as Puna (1 representative).
2. Second District – That portion of the island of Hawai'i known as South Hilo (4 representatives).
3. Third District – That portion of the island of Hawai'i known as North Hilo and Hāmākua (1 representative).
4. Fourth District – That portion of the island of Hawai'i known as Kaʻū and South Kona and that portion of North Kona referred to as Keauhou (1 representative).
5. Fifth District – That portion of the island of Hawai'i known as Kohala and that portion of North Kona not included in the fourth representative district (1 representative).
6. Sixth District – The islands of Molokaʻi and Lānaʻi (1 representative).
7. Seventh District – The islands of Maui and Kahoʻolawe; (5 representatives).
8. Eighth District – That portion of the island of O'ahu known as Koʻolaupoko and Koʻolauloa (2 representatives).
9. Ninth District – That portion of the island of O'ahu known as Waialua and Wahiawa (2 representatives).
10. Tenth District – That portion of the island of O'ahu known as Ewa and Waianae (2 representatives).
11. Eleventh District – That portion of the island of O'ahu referred to as Kalihi (3 representatives).
12. Twelfth District – That portion of the island of O'ahu referred to as Upper Nuʻuanu (3 representatives).
13. Thirteenth District – That portion of the island of O'ahu referred to as Kapālama (3 representatives).
14. Fourteenth District – That portion of the island of O'ahu referred to as Pauoa (5 representatives).
15. Fifteenth District – That portion of the island of O'ahu referred to as Mānoa and Waikīkī (6 representatives).
16. Sixteenth District – That portion of the island of O'ahu referred to as Kaimuki and Kapahulu (4 representatives).
17. Seventeenth District – That portion of the island of O'ahu not included in any other representative district on the island of O'ahu, together with all other islands not included in any other representative district (3 representatives).
18. Eighteenth District – The islands of Kaua'i and Ni'ihau (4 representatives).

Candidates to the House of Representatives were required to be 25 years of age, be a citizen of the United States, and have lived in Hawaii for at least three years. The original text, written in 1900, required that a senator "be a male citizen of the United States;" this gender requirement stood until 1922.

== See also ==
- Hawaii Admission Act
- Territory of Hawaii
