= James v. United States =

James v. United States may refer to the following decisions of the Supreme Court of the United States:

- James v. United States (1906), 202 U.S. 401
- James v. United States (1961), which held that illegally obtained money was federally taxable income regardless of whether it was repaid as restitution to a victim.
- James v. United States (2007), 550 U.S. 192 (2007), which held that attempted burglary was a predicate felony under the Armed Career Criminal Act.
