= Fleitas v. Richardson =

1893 United States Supreme Court case

- Supreme Court of the United States

Argued April 14, 1892 Decided March 8, 1893
- Full case name: Fleitas v. Richardson
- Citations: 147 U.S. 550 (more) 13 S. Ct. 495; 37 L. Ed. 276

Case history
- Prior: 39 F. 129

Holding
- Under the Louisiana Code, the liability of the husband to the wife for her separate property received by him under the marriage contract is in the nature of a debt secured by mortgage of his lands, and may be enforced by her by direct suit against him. It may also be extinguished by his discharge in bankruptcy.

Court membership
- Chief Justice Melville Fuller Associate Justices Stephen J. Field · John M. Harlan; Horace Gray · Samuel Blatchford; David J. Brewer · Henry B. Brown; George Shiras Jr. · Howell E. Jackson

Case opinion
- Majority: Gray, joined by unanimous
- Shiras took no part in the consideration or decision of the case.

Laws applied
- La. Civ. Code, Arts. 2325 (2305), 2328 (2308), 2329 (2309), 2331 (2311), 2332 (2312), 2399 (2369).

Fleitas v. Richardson, 147 U.S. 550 (1893), was a United States Supreme Court case in which the Court held that, under the Louisiana Code, a husband's liability to his wife for her separate property received by him under the marriage contract is considered a debt secured by a mortgage on his lands. This liability may be enforced by the wife through a direct suit against her husband. The Court also held that the liability may be extinguished by the husband's discharge in bankruptcy.

== Background ==
The plaintiff, Mary C. W. Fleitas, married Francis B. Fleitas on February 6, 1868, in St. Bernard Parish, Louisiana. Before the marriage, the couple and her parents signed a marriage contract stipulating that her parents' gift of $20,000 would be secured by a mortgage granted by Francis Fleitas in favor of his wife, as provided by Louisiana law. This law classified her parents' contribution as a dotal (or dowry) contribution.

On April 25, 1877, Francis B. Fleitas obtained a discharge in bankruptcy from the United States District Court for the Eastern District of Louisiana. In 1884, he purchased land subject to a mortgage held by Gilbert M. Richardson, a citizen of New York, and Albert R. Shattuck and Francis B. Hoffman, both citizens of Massachusetts, who were the defendants in this case.

On September 3, 1887, Mrs. Fleitas filed a petition in the state court of St. Bernard Parish against her husband seeking a separation of property and recognition of her mortgage on all his lands in that parish. She alleged that he was heavily in debt and that there was a risk that his estate would not be sufficient to satisfy her rights and claims. On September 10, 1887, she obtained a judgment against Francis Fleitas, granting a separation of property and ordering that the sum of $20,000, held by him as her paraphernal property, be returned to her and recognized as secured by a legal mortgage on all his lands in the parish. The sheriff executed this order.

Subsequently, on June 29, 1888, Richardson initiated executory proceedings on the mortgage of January 28, 1884, seeking the seizure and sale of the lands, as outlined in the preceding case, the record of which was incorporated into this case.

The defendants removed the case to the United States Circuit Court on the grounds that a separable controversy existed between them and the plaintiff and that the suit involved a question under United States bankruptcy law regarding the effect of the husband’s discharge in bankruptcy on the plaintiff’s claim and mortgage.

== Opinion of the Court ==
The Court began by explaining and applying Louisiana's laws governing the rights of married women, which "differ widely from the common law." Fleitas, 147 U.S. at 552. Citing Louisiana Civil Code articles 2334 and 2335, the Court explained that the separate property of the wife includes property she "brings into the marriage, or acquires during the marriage by inheritance or by donation made to her particularly," and that this property "is divided into dotal and extradotal property." Dotal property is that which the wife brings to the husband to assist him in bearing the expenses of the marriage establishment. Extradotal property, also known as "paraphernal property," is that which forms no part of the dowry.

The Court held that the husband's liability to the wife for her separate property received by him under the marriage contract is considered a debt secured by a mortgage on his lands, which the wife may enforce through a direct suit against him.

Under Louisiana Civil Code, article 2425 (formerly 2399), the wife may, at any time during the marriage, sue the husband for a separation of property "when the disorder of his affairs induces her to believe that his estate may not be sufficient to meet her rights and claims." Consequently, a transfer of property or a confession of judgment by an insolvent husband to his wife, in settlement of her claims, is valid against his creditors. The Court cited Lehman v. Levy, 30 La. Ann. 745, 750; Levi v. Morgan, 33 La. Ann. 532; and Thompson v. Freeman, 34 La. Ann. 992, in support of this principle.

Given the nature of the husband’s liability for his wife’s paraphernal property under Louisiana law, the Court determined that this liability was clearly provable as a debt by the wife against the husband under the Bankruptcy Act of the United States. The Court referenced Rev. Stat. § 5067 and cases such as In re Bigelow, 3 Ben. 198; In re Blandin, 1 Low. 543; and In re Jones, 6 Biss. 68, 78.

The Court further clarified that this liability did not have the characteristics of a trust, particularly not the characteristics of a technical trust that would qualify it as a fiduciary debt under the Bankruptcy Act. As a result, the liability was barred by the husband's discharge in bankruptcy. The Court cited Rev. Stat. §§ 5117, 5119; Hennequin v. Clews, 111 U.S. 676, 4 Sup. Ct. Rep. 576; and Upshur v. Briscoe, 138 U.S. 365, 11 Sup. Ct. Rep. 313.

Having resolved this issue, the Court then addressed the second question: whether the Fleitases could benefit from the husband's discharge in bankruptcy. The Court held that, under Louisiana law, the husband's discharge in bankruptcy extinguished his debt to his wife, and as a result, her mortgage, which merely served as security for that debt, was also extinguished. Consequently, the mortgage could not attach to the lands subsequently purchased by him. Therefore, the appellees, who claimed the land as his creditors under a mortgage from him, were entitled to assert his discharge in bankruptcy as a defense against any lien claimed by her on the property.

== See also ==
- List of United States Supreme Court cases, volume 147
