= Louisiana Code of Evidence =

Law of Louisiana

Louisiana State Legislature
- Enacted: January 1, 1989

Legislative history
- Bill title: section 1 of Act 515 of 1988
- Introduced by: Ben Bagert

Related legislation
- Senate Bill 155

Summary
- Attempted 1818, 1956, 1986, 1987, and 1988

Keywords
- Governor Buddy Roemer

The Louisiana Code of Evidence is a code of evidence law, enacted by section 1 of Act 515 of 1988, under Louisiana Civil Law. The Code became effective on January 1, 1989, and governs proceedings in the courts of Louisiana to the extent and with the exceptions stated in Article 1101 of the Code. The Bill for Act 515 of 1988 was Senate Bill 155, introduced by Senator Ben Bagert.

Laws for a code of evidence was introduced in 1818, 1956, 1986, and 1987. After nearly two centuries of failed attempts to codify Louisiana's evidence law, the Louisiana State Legislature enacted an Evidence Code in 1988.

== History ==
The evidentiary reform movement began in Britain in the early nineteenth century under the leadership of Jeremy Bentham. "Within a short time of the publication of Bentham's ‘Theory of Judicial Evidence’ in 1818, Louisiana's Edward Livingston, considered "America's Bentham", by Wigmore, prepared and proposed to the Louisiana Legislature a Code of Evidence for this state, designed to govern proceedings in both civil and criminal cases. Had it been adopted, the development of evidence law in the United States might well have been very different. However, the Livingston Evidence Code was not enacted.

By the middle of the twentieth century, Louisiana evidence law had become notoriously murky and uncertain. This confusion led to a second attempt at codification in 1956. After some ten years of effort, the Louisiana Law Institute abandoned the project, in part because the contending forces simply could not agree.

== Current law ==
In 1979 the quest for an evidence code was renewed by Ben Bagert, a state legislator who was also a lawyer with an active litigation practice. By then, a Federal Code of Evidence had been adopted and Bagert had experienced, first hand, how justice was better served when the court and the litigants had a rule book to guide them. Because Bagert believed that these benefits were achievable in state court proceedings, he persuaded the Legislature to direct that a code of evidence be drafted. Following this directive, the Louisiana Law Institute again accepted the challenge of compiling a code and a proposal was published and submitted to the legislature in 1986. As with the Livingston Code and the 1956 attempt by the Law Institute, the Proposed Code proved controversial. What the plaintiff bar liked, the defense bar disliked. What prosecutors abhorred, criminal defense lawyers applauded. The Proposed Code did not come out of committee in the 1986 legislature. In the 1987 session, another stalemate blocked the adoption of Bagert’s bill proposing an Evidence Code.

Observers of the legislature were predicting a similar fate for the Proposed Code in the 1988 legislative session; however, as lead author of the bill, Bagert had been conducting frequent meetings with the competing forces who had doomed the codes of prior years. On the night before his bill was to be considered by Senate Committee, Senator Bagert, sensing that a compromise was achievable, convened a meeting of opposing factions in the Senate basement. In attendance besides Senator Bagert were Kerry Triche, of the Louisiana Law Institute; Jack Martzell, of the Louisiana Trial Lawyers Association; John Mamoulides and Bernie Boudreaux, district attorneys representing the District Attorneys Association; and Robert Glass, Frank Desalvo, James E. Boren, and John Reed, eminent criminal defense lawyers. Just before midnight a compromise was achieved and additional amendments were drafted for consideration by the committee when morning arrived.

On the ensuing day, legislative observers were stunned to see that the competing adversaries had agreed to the enactment of an evidence code as amended. After the compromise, Senator Bagert’s bill was enacted by the legislature and signed into law by Governor Buddy Roemer.

== See also ==
- United States Federal Rules of Evidence
- Evidence law
- Kearny Code
