= List of United States Supreme Court cases, volume 147 =

Supreme Court of the United States
- Interactive map of Supreme Court of the United States
- 38°53′26″N 77°00′16″W
- Established: March 4, 1789; 236 years ago
- Location: Washington, D.C.
- Coordinates: 38°53′26″N 77°00′16″W
- Composition method: Presidential nomination with Senate confirmation
- Authorised by: Constitution of the United States, Art. III, § 1
- Judge term length: life tenure, subject to impeachment and removal
- Number of positions: 9 (by statute)
- Website: supremecourt.gov

This is a list of cases reported in volume 147 of United States Reports, decided by the Supreme Court of the United States in 1893.

== Justices of the Supreme Court at the time of volume 147 U.S. ==
The Supreme Court is established by Article III, Section 1 of the Constitution of the United States, which says: "The judicial Power of the United States, shall be vested in one supreme Court . . .". The size of the Court is not specified; the Constitution leaves it to Congress to set the number of justices. Under the Judiciary Act of 1789 Congress originally fixed the number of justices at six (one chief justice and five associate justices). Since 1789 Congress has varied the size of the Court from six to seven, nine, ten, and back to nine justices (always including one chief justice).

When the cases in volume 147 U.S. were decided the Court comprised, at any one time, at least nine of the following members (Justice Lamar died in January 1893 and was replaced by Justice Jackson in March 1893):

Portrait	Justice	Office	Home State	Succeeded	Date confirmed by the Senate (Vote)	Tenure on Supreme Court
	Melville Fuller	Chief Justice	Illinois	Morrison Waite	July 20, 1888 (41–20)	October 8, 1888 – July 4, 1910 (Died)
	Stephen Johnson Field	Associate Justice	California	newly created seat	March 10, 1863 (Acclamation)	May 10, 1863 – December 1, 1897 (Retired)
	John Marshall Harlan	Associate Justice	Kentucky	David Davis	November 29, 1877 (Acclamation)	December 10, 1877 – October 14, 1911 (Died)
	Horace Gray	Associate Justice	Massachusetts	Nathan Clifford	December 20, 1881 (51–5)	January 9, 1882 – September 15, 1902 (Died)
	Samuel Blatchford	Associate Justice	New York	Ward Hunt	March 22, 1882 (Acclamation)	April 3, 1882 – July 7, 1893 (Died)
	Lucius Quintus Cincinnatus Lamar	Associate Justice	Mississippi	William Burnham Woods	January 16, 1888 (32–28)	January 18, 1888 – January 23, 1893 (Died)
	David Josiah Brewer	Associate Justice	Kansas	Stanley Matthews	December 18, 1889 (53–11)	January 6, 1890 – March 28, 1910 (Died)
	Henry Billings Brown	Associate Justice	Michigan	Samuel Freeman Miller	December 29, 1890 (Acclamation)	January 5, 1891 – May 28, 1906 (Retired)
	George Shiras Jr.	Associate Justice	Pennsylvania	Joseph P. Bradley	July 26, 1892 (Acclamation)	October 10, 1892 – February 23, 1903 (Retired)
	Howell Edmunds Jackson	Associate Justice	Tennessee	Lucius Quintus Cincinnatus Lamar	February 18, 1893 (Acclamation)	March 4, 1893 – August 8, 1895 (Died)

== Notable Cases in 147 U.S. ==
=== Kohn v. McNulta ===
In Kohn v. McNulta, 147 U.S. 238 (1893), the Supreme Court held that a person should not receive compensation for injuries sustained when he is experienced in his work, and there is no evidence of negligence or extenuating circumstances.

=== Shoemaker v. United States ===
Shoemaker v. United States, 147 U.S. 282 (1893), concerned the United States Constitution's Appointments Clause. The Supreme Court held that Congress may expand the duties an existing office without it being necessary that the incumbent again be nominated and confirmed, as long as the new duties are "germane" to those already held by the office.

== Citation style ==
Under the Judiciary Act of 1789 the federal court structure at the time comprised District Courts, which had general trial jurisdiction; Circuit Courts, which had mixed trial and appellate (from the US District Courts) jurisdiction; and the United States Supreme Court, which had appellate jurisdiction over the federal District and Circuit courts—and for certain issues over state courts. The Supreme Court also had limited original jurisdiction (i.e., in which cases could be filed directly with the Supreme Court without first having been heard by a lower federal or state court). There were one or more federal District Courts and/or Circuit Courts in each state, territory, or other geographical region.

The Judiciary Act of 1891 created the United States Courts of Appeals and reassigned the jurisdiction of most routine appeals from the district and circuit courts to these appellate courts. The Act created nine new courts that were originally known as the "United States Circuit Courts of Appeals." The new courts had jurisdiction over most appeals of lower court decisions. The Supreme Court could review either legal issues that a court of appeals certified or decisions of court of appeals by writ of certiorari.

Bluebook citation style is used for case names, citations, and jurisdictions.

- "# Cir." = United States Court of Appeals
  - e.g., "3d Cir." = United States Court of Appeals for the Third Circuit
- "C.C.D." = United States Circuit Court for the District of . . .
  - e.g.,"C.C.D.N.J." = United States Circuit Court for the District of New Jersey
- "D." = United States District Court for the District of . . .
  - e.g.,"D. Mass." = United States District Court for the District of Massachusetts
- "E." = Eastern; "M." = Middle; "N." = Northern; "S." = Southern; "W." = Western
  - e.g.,"C.C.S.D.N.Y." = United States Circuit Court for the Southern District of New York
  - e.g.,"M.D. Ala." = United States District Court for the Middle District of Alabama
- "Ct. Cl." = United States Court of Claims
- The abbreviation of a state's name alone indicates the highest appellate court in that state's judiciary at the time.
  - e.g.,"Pa." = Supreme Court of Pennsylvania
  - e.g.,"Me." = Supreme Judicial Court of Maine

== List of cases in volume 147 U.S. ==
Case Name	Page and year	Opinion of the Court	Concurring opinion(s)	Dissenting opinion(s)	Lower Court	Disposition
Iowa v. Illinois	1 (1893)	Field	none	none	original	boundary set
In re Morrison	14 (1893)	Blatchford	none	none	2d Cir.	multiple
Streeter v. Jefferson County National Bank	36 (1893)	Shiras	none	none	N.Y. Sup. Ct.	affirmed
Monroe Cattle Company v. Becker	47 (1893)	Brown	none	none	C.C.N.D. Tex.	reversed
Lytle v. Town of Lansing	59 (1893)	Brown	none	none	C.C.N.D.N.Y.	affirmed
Alexandre v. Machan	72 (1893)	Brewer	none	none	Sup. Ct. Terr. N.M.	affirmed
The City of New York	72 (1893)	Brown	none	none	C.C.S.D.N.Y.	affirmed
Albuquerque National Bank v. Perea	87 (1893)	Brewer	none	none	Sup. Ct. Terr. N.M.	affirmed
Knox County v. Ninth National Bank	91 (1893)	Brewer	none	none	C.C.E.D. Mo.	affirmed
Lake Shore and Michigan Southern Railway Company v. Prentice	101 (1893)	Gray	none	none	C.C.N.D. Ill.	reversed
Ankeney v. Hannon	118 (1893)	Field	none	none	C.C.S.D. Ohio	affirmed
Fisher v. Shropshire	133 (1893)	Fuller	none	none	C.C.S.D. Iowa	reversed
Jennings v. Coal Ridge Improvement and Coal Company	147 (1893)	Fuller	none	none	Pa.	affirmed
United States ex rel. Trask v. Wanamaker	149 (1893)	Fuller	none	none	Sup. Ct. D.C.	dismissed
Holmes v. Goldsmith	150 (1893)	Shiras	none	none	C.C.D. Or.	affirmed
Noble v. Union River Logging Railroad Company	165 (1893)	Brown	none	none	Sup. Ct. D.C.	affirmed
Miles v. Connecticut Mutual Life Insurance Company	177 (1893)	Blatchford	none	Brown	C.C.E.D. Pa.	affirmed
Illinois Central Railroad Company v. City of Decatur	190 (1893)	Brewer	none	none	Ill.	affirmed
De la Vergne Refrigerating Machine Company v. Featherstone	209 (1893)	Fuller	none	none	7th Cir.	certification
Sutliff v. Lake County	230 (1893)	Gray	none	none	8th Cir.	certification
Kohn v. McNulta	238 (1893)	Brewer	none	none	C.C.N.D. Ohio	affirmed
Bernier v. Bernier	242 (1893)	Field	none	none	Mich.	reversed
Osborne v. Missouri Pacific Railroad Company	248 (1893)	Fuller	none	none	C.C.E.D. Mo.	affirmed
City of New Orleans v. Paine	261 (1893)	Brown	none	none	5th Cir.	affirmed
United States v. Harmon	268 (1893)	Blatchford	none	none	C.C.D. Me.	affirmed
Shoemaker v. United States	282 (1893)	Shiras	none	none	Sup. Ct. D.C.	affirmed
Weatherhead v. Coupe	322 (1893)	Blatchford	none	none	C.C.D.R.I.	reversed
Luxton v. North River Bridge Company	337 (1893)	Gray	none	none	C.C.D.N.J.	dismissed
Smithmeyer v. United States	342 (1893)	Blatchford	none	none	Ct. Cl.	affirmed
Glenn v. Garth	360 (1893)	Fuller	none	none	N.Y. Sup. Ct.	dismissed
Walter v. Northeastern Railroad Company	370 (1893)	Brown	none	none	C.C.D.S.C.	reversed
Keels v. Central Railroad Company	374 (1893)	Brown	none	none	C.C.D.S.C.	reversed
Cooke v. Avery	375 (1893)	Fuller	none	none	C.C.N.D. Tex.	multiple
Harmon v. City of Chicago	396 (1893)	Field	none	none	Ill.	reversed
Doyle v. Union Pacific Railroad Company	413 (1893)	Shiras	none	none	C.C.D. Colo.	affirmed
United Lines Telegraph Company v. Boston Safe Deposit and Trust Company	431 (1893)	Blatchford	none	none	C.C.S.D.N.Y.	affirmed
Horner v. United States	449 (1893)	Blatchford	none	none	2d Cir.	certification
Clement v. Field	467 (1893)	Shiras	none	none	C.C.D. Kan.	affirmed
Barnett v. Kinney	476 (1893)	Fuller	none	none	Sup. Ct. Terr. Idaho	reversed
In Re Hawkins	486 (1893)	Fuller	none	none	2d Cir.	mandamus denied
Thorington v. City of Montgomery	490 (1893)	Fuller	none	none	Ala.	dismissed
Arnold v. United States	494 (1893)	Brewer	none	none	C.C.S.D.N.Y.	affirmed
Schunk v. Moline, Milburn & Stoddart Company	500 (1893)	Brewer	none	none	C.C.D. Neb.	affirmed
Stanley v. Schwalby	508 (1893)	Fuller	none	Field	Tex.	reversed
In re Haberman Manufacturing Company	525 (1893)	Blatchford	none	none	C.C.S.D.N.Y.	mandamus denied
Hamblin v. Western Land Company	531 (1893)	Brewer	none	none	Iowa	affirmed
Fleitas v. Richardson	538 (1893)	Gray	none	none	C.C.E.D. La.	dismissed
Fleitas v. Richardson	550 (1893)	Gray	none	none	C.C.E.D. La.	affirmed
Hayes v. Pratt	557 (1893)	Gray	none	none	C.C.D.N.J.	affirmed
Washington and Georgetown Railroad Company v. Harmon's Administrator	571 (1893)	Fuller	none	none	Sup. Ct. D.C.	affirmed
New York, Lake Erie and Western Railroad Company v. Estill	591 (1893)	Blatchford	none	none	C.C.W.D. Mo.	multiple
Lovell Manufacturing Company v. Cary	623 (1893)	Blatchford	none	none	C.C.W.D. Pa.	reversed
Taylor v. Brown	640 (1893)	Fuller	none	none	Sup. Ct. Terr. Dakota	affirmed
Bauserman v. Blunt	647 (1893)	Gray	none	none	C.C.D. Kan.	reversed
United States v. Tanner	661 (1893)	Brown	none	none	Ct. Cl.	reversed
United States v. Fletcher	664 (1893)	Brown	none	none	C.C.E.D. Ark.	reversed
United States v. Pitman	669 (1893)	Brown	none	none	D.R.I.	affirmed
United States v. Jones	672 (1893)	Brown	none	none	S.D. Ala.	reversed
United States v. King	676 (1893)	Brown	none	none	S.D. Ga.	reversed
United States v. Erwin	685 (1893)	Brown	none	none	Ct. Cl.	affirmed
United States v. Payne	687 (1893)	Brown	none	none	Ct. Cl.	reversed
United States v. Hall	691 (1893)	Brown	none	none	N.D. Ohio	reversed
United States v. McCandless	692 (1893)	Brown	none	none	Ct. Cl.	reversed
United States v. Taylor	695 (1893)	Brown	none	none	C.C.E.D. Tenn.	reversed
