= Extra-dotal property =

In Louisiana law, extra-dotal property is that property which forms no part of the dowry of a woman (which would mean that her husband has certain rights to it), but is hers alone. It is also called "paraphernal property", from the Greek for "beyond the dowry", which gives us the word "paraphernalia".

The United States Supreme Court determined the extent and effect of extradotal law on the rights of married women in Louisiana in the case of Fleitas v. Richardson.
