= Duncan v. Kahanamoku =

- Supreme Court of the United States

Argued December 7, 1945 Decided February 25, 1946
- Full case name: Duncan v. Duke Kahanamoku, Sheriff
- Citations: 327 U.S. 304 (more) 66 S. Ct. 606; 90 L. Ed. 688

Case history
- Prior: Ex parte Duncan, 146 F.2d 576 (9th Cir. 1944); cert. granted, 324 U.S. 833 (1945).

Holding
- Duncan's trial by military tribunal was not authorized by the Hawaiian Organic Act.

Court membership
- Chief Justice Harlan F. Stone Associate Justices Hugo Black · Stanley F. Reed; Felix Frankfurter · William O. Douglas; Frank Murphy · Robert H. Jackson; Wiley B. Rutledge · Harold H. Burton

Case opinions
- Majority: Black, joined by Reed, Douglas, Murphy, Rutledge
- Concurrence: Murphy
- Concurrence: Stone
- Dissent: Burton, joined by Frankfurter
- Jackson took no part in the consideration or decision of the case.

Duncan v. Kahanamoku, 327 U.S. 304 (1946), was a decision by the United States Supreme Court. It is often associated with the Japanese exclusion cases (Hirabayashi v. United States, Korematsu v. United States and Ex parte Endo) because it involved wartime curtailment of fundamental civil liberties under the aegis of military authority, though in this case neither the plaintiff nor the nominal defendant were Japanese.

While Duke Kahanamoku was a military police officer during World War II, he arrested Lloyd C. Duncan, a civilian shipfitter on February 24, 1944, after Duncan's brawl with two armed Marine sentries at the yard. At the time, Hawaii was not yet a state and was administered under the Hawaiian Organic Act. After the attack on Pearl Harbor, the Governor of Hawaii suspended the writ of habeas corpus and placed the territory under martial law.

Duncan was tried and convicted by a military tribunal for assault on military or naval personnel with intent to resist or hinder them in the discharge of their duty. However, civilian courts had restarted summoning jurors and witnesses and conducting criminal trials on the island.

Duncan appealed to the Supreme Court, which ruled that his trial by military tribunal was not authorized by the Hawaiian Organic Act.

== See also ==
- List of United States Supreme Court cases, volume 327
