= Estep v. United States =

- Supreme Court of the United States

Argued November 7, 1945 Decided February 4, 1946
- Full case name: Estep v. United States
- Citations: 327 U.S. 114 (more) 66 S. Ct. 423; 90 L. Ed. 567; 1946 U.S. LEXIS 2807

Court membership
- Chief Justice Harlan F. Stone Associate Justices Hugo Black · Stanley F. Reed; Felix Frankfurter · William O. Douglas; Frank Murphy · Robert H. Jackson; Wiley B. Rutledge · Harold H. Burton

Case opinions
- Majority: Douglas
- Concurrence: Murphy
- Concurrence: Rutledge
- Concurrence: Frankfurter
- Dissent: Burton, joined by Stone
- Jackson took no part in the consideration or decision of the case.

Estep v. United States, 327 U.S. 114 (1946), was a case in which the Supreme Court of the United States held that a draft board's refusal to classify a Jehovah's Witness as minister is, after exhausting administrative remedies, subject to judicial review.

== Background ==
According to the judicial opinion itself:

Estep's local board classified him as I-A, i.e., as available for military service. Sec. 5(d) of the Selective Service Act exempts from training and service (but not from registration) "regular or duly ordained ministers of religion". Under the regulations those in that category are classified as IV-D. Estep, a member of Jehovah's Witnesses, claimed that he was entitled to that classification. The local board ruled against him. He took his case to the appeal board which classified him as I-A. He then asked the State and National Directors of Selective Service to appeal to the President for him. His request was refused. The local board thereupon ordered him to report for induction. He reported at the time and place indicated. He was accepted by the Navy. But he refused to be inducted, claiming that he was exempt from service because he was an ordained minister of the gospel. He was indicted under 11 of the Act for wilfully failing and refusing to submit to induction. He sought to defend on the ground that as a Jehovah's Witness he was a minister of religion and that he had been improperly denied exemption from service, because the classifying agencies acted arbitrarily and capriciously in refusing to classify him as IV-D.
