= American Power & Light Co. v. SEC =

- Supreme Court of the United States

Decided November 25, 1946
- Full case name: American Power and Light Company v. Securities and Exchange Commission
- Citations: 329 U.S. 90 (more)

Holding
- The Commerce Clause allows the federal government to dissolve a public utility company that is not serving the local community properly.

Court membership
- Chief Justice Fred M. Vinson Associate Justices Hugo Black · Stanley F. Reed; Felix Frankfurter · William O. Douglas; Frank Murphy · Robert H. Jackson; Wiley B. Rutledge · Harold H. Burton

Case opinions
- Majority: Murphy
- Concur/dissent: Frankfurter
- Concur/dissent: Rutledge
- Reed, Douglas, Jackson took no part in the consideration or decision of the case.

Laws applied
- Commerce Clause

American Power & Light Co. v. SEC, 329 U.S. 90 (1946), was a United States Supreme Court case in which the Court held that the Commerce Clause allows the federal government to dissolve a public utility company that is not serving the local community properly.

== See also ==
- North American Co. v. SEC
