= Lavender v. Kurn =

- Supreme Court of the United States

Argued March 6–7, 1946 Decided March 25, 1946
- Full case name: Lavender v. Kurn, et al.
- Citations: 327 U.S. 645 (more) 66 S.Ct. 740; 90 L. Ed. 916; 1946 U.S. LEXIS 3014

Case history
- Prior: Certiorari to the Supreme Court of Missouri, 189 S.W.2d 253

Holding
- There was sufficient evidence of negligence on the part of the defendants to justify the submission of the case to the jury and to require appellate courts to abide by the verdict rendered by the jury.

Court membership
- Chief Justice Harlan F. Stone Associate Justices Hugo Black · Stanley F. Reed; Felix Frankfurter · William O. Douglas; Frank Murphy · Robert H. Jackson; Wiley B. Rutledge · Harold H. Burton

Case opinions
- Majority: Murphy, joined by Black, Frankfurter, Douglas, Jackson, Rutledge, Burton
- Dissent: Reed

Lavender v. Kurn, 327 U.S. 645 (1946), was a case decided by the Supreme Court of the United States dealing with a negligent wrongful death case against a railroad employer under the Federal Employers Liability Act. L.E. Haney was a switchtender who was killed at Grand Central Station in Memphis, Tennessee. He worked for both the Illinois Central and Frisco railroads.

The Missouri Supreme Court ordered a directed verdict in favor of the employer, claiming lack of evidence of negligence. The Supreme Court overruled the State Supreme Court's ruling. The court held that there was sufficient evidence of negligence on the part of the defendants to justify the submission of the case to the jury and to require appellate courts to abide by the verdict rendered by the jury.

== See also ==
- List of United States Supreme Court cases, volume 327
- Kohn v. McNulta
