= List of United States Supreme Court cases, volume 327 =

This is a list of all the United States Supreme Court cases from volume 327 of the United States Reports:

Case name	Citation	Date decided
In re Yamashita	327 U.S. 1	1946
Canizio v. New York	327 U.S. 82	1946
Case v. Bowles	327 U.S. 92	1946
Hulbert v. Twin Falls Cnty.	327 U.S. 103	1946
United States v. Johnson (1946)	327 U.S. 106	1946
Estep v. United States	327 U.S. 114	1946
Hannegan v. Esquire, Inc.	327 U.S. 146	1946
Meyer v. Fleming	327 U.S. 161	1946
Martino v. Michigan Window Cleaning Co.	327 U.S. 173	1946
Mabee v. White Plains Publ'g Co.	327 U.S. 178	1946
Oklahoma Press Publ'g Co. v. Walling	327 U.S. 186	1946
Griffin v. Griffin	327 U.S. 220	1946
Bigelow v. RKO Radio Pics., Inc.	327 U.S. 251	1946
American Sur. Co. v. Sampsell	327 U.S. 269	1946
Ashcraft v. Tennessee (1946)	327 U.S. 274	1946
Commissioner v. Tower	327 U.S. 280	1946
Lusthaus v. Commissioner	327 U.S. 293	1946
Duncan v. Kahanamoku	327 U.S. 304	1946
Social Sec. Bd. v. Nierotko	327 U.S. 358	1946
United States v. Petty Motor Co.	327 U.S. 372	1946
NLRB v. Cheney Cal. Lumber Co.	327 U.S. 385	1946
Holmberg v. Armbrecht	327 U.S. 392	1946
Poff v. Pennsylvania R.R. Co.	327 U.S. 399	1946
Commissioner v. Wilcox	327 U.S. 404	1946
Nippert v. Richmond	327 U.S. 416	1946
United States v. American Union Transp., Inc.	327 U.S. 437	1946
Boutell v. Walling	327 U.S. 463	1946
Wilson v. Cook	327 U.S. 474	1946
Duggan v. Sansberry	327 U.S. 499	1946
Commissioner v. Fisher	327 U.S. 512	1946
United States v. Pierce Auto Freight Lines, Inc.	327 U.S. 515	1946
Cherry Cotton Mills, Inc. v. United States	327 U.S. 536	1946
Macauley v. Waterman S.S. Corp.	327 U.S. 540	1946
United States ex rel. TVA v. Welch	327 U.S. 546	1946
S.R.A., Inc. v. Minnesota	327 U.S. 558	1946
Kennecott Copper Corp. v. State Tax Comm'n	327 U.S. 573	1946
AFL v. Watson	327 U.S. 582	1946
Jacob Siegel Co. v. FTC	327 U.S. 608	1946
M. Kraus & Bros., Inc. v. United States	327 U.S. 614	1946
United States v. Carbone	327 U.S. 633	1946
Lavender v. Kurn	327 U.S. 645	1946
McAllister Lighterage Line, Inc. v. United States	327 U.S. 655	1946
Elgin J. & E.R.R. Co. v. Burley	327 U.S. 661	1946
Bell v. Hood	327 U.S. 678	1946
North American Co. v. Securities and Exchange Commission	327 U.S. 686	1946
Williams v. United States	327 U.S. 711	1946
Heiser v. Woodruff	327 U.S. 726	1946
United States v. Rice	327 U.S. 742	1946
United States ex rel. Nitkey v. Dawes	327 U.S. 788	1946
