= Kohn v. McNulta =

- Supreme Court of the United States

Submitted January 4, 1893 Decided January 16, 1893
- Full case name: Kohn v. McNulta
- Citations: 147 U.S. 238 (more) 13 S. Ct. 298; 37 L. Ed. 150; 1893 U.S. LEXIS 2158

Case history
- Prior: Appeal from the Circuit Court of the United States for the Northern District of Ohio

Holding
- A person should not receive compensation for injuries sustained when he is experienced in his work and there is no evidence of negligence or extenuating circumstances.

Court membership
- Chief Justice Melville Fuller Associate Justices Stephen J. Field · John M. Harlan; Horace Gray · Samuel Blatchford; Lucius Q. C. Lamar II · David J. Brewer; Henry B. Brown · George Shiras Jr.

Case opinion
- Majority: Brewer, joined by unanimous

Kohn v. McNulta, 147 U.S. 238 (1893), was a United States Supreme Court case in which the Court held that a person should not receive compensation for injuries sustained when he is experienced in his work and there is no evidence of negligence or extenuating circumstances.

== Background ==
Kohn began working as a switchman for McNulta, the receiver (buyer) of the Wabash, St. Louis and Pacific Railway Company on April 29, 1887. On July 11, Kohn’s arm was crushed while trying to couple two freight cars in the Toledo, Ohio railyard.

Kohn filed his petition of intervention in the Circuit Court for the Northern District of Ohio, the court which had appointed McNulta the receiver. At first, his intervening petition was referred to a master, but afterward, on his motion, the order of reference was set aside and a jury called in. The court left to the jury the single question of the amount of damages that the intervenor should recover if entitled to recover anything. The jury responded $10,000. The court found that no cause of action was made out against the receiver, set aside the verdict of the jury, and dismissed the petition. The intervenor appealed to the Supreme Court.

== Opinion of the Court ==
The Court held that a person should not receive compensation for injuries sustained when he is experienced in his work and there is no evidence of negligence or extenuating circumstances. Kohn had argued that the Company was negligent in exposing Kohn to cars that were different from the ones he was used to handling. The Court disagreed, reasoning that he was a mature and experienced man who should have been able to cope with the existing conditions. The train cars were not defective in any way. They had the double deadwoods or bumpers of unusual length and were constructed differently, but this should have been obvious even at a passing glance. Kohn had already been working there for two months, long enough to know the risks.

== See also ==
- List of United States Supreme Court cases, volume 147
- Lavender v. Kurn
- Wabash, St. Louis & Pacific Railway Company v. Illinois
