= Judiciary of Louisiana =

The Judiciary of Louisiana is defined under the Constitution and law of Louisiana and is composed of the Louisiana Supreme Court, the Louisiana Circuit Courts of Appeal, the District Courts, the Justice of the Peace Courts, the Mayor's Courts, the City Courts, and the Parish Courts. The Chief Justice of the Louisiana Supreme Court is the chief administrator of the judiciary, and its administration is aided by the Judiciary Commission of Louisiana, the Louisiana Attorney Disciplinary Board, and the Judicial Council of the Supreme Court of Louisiana.

== Courts ==
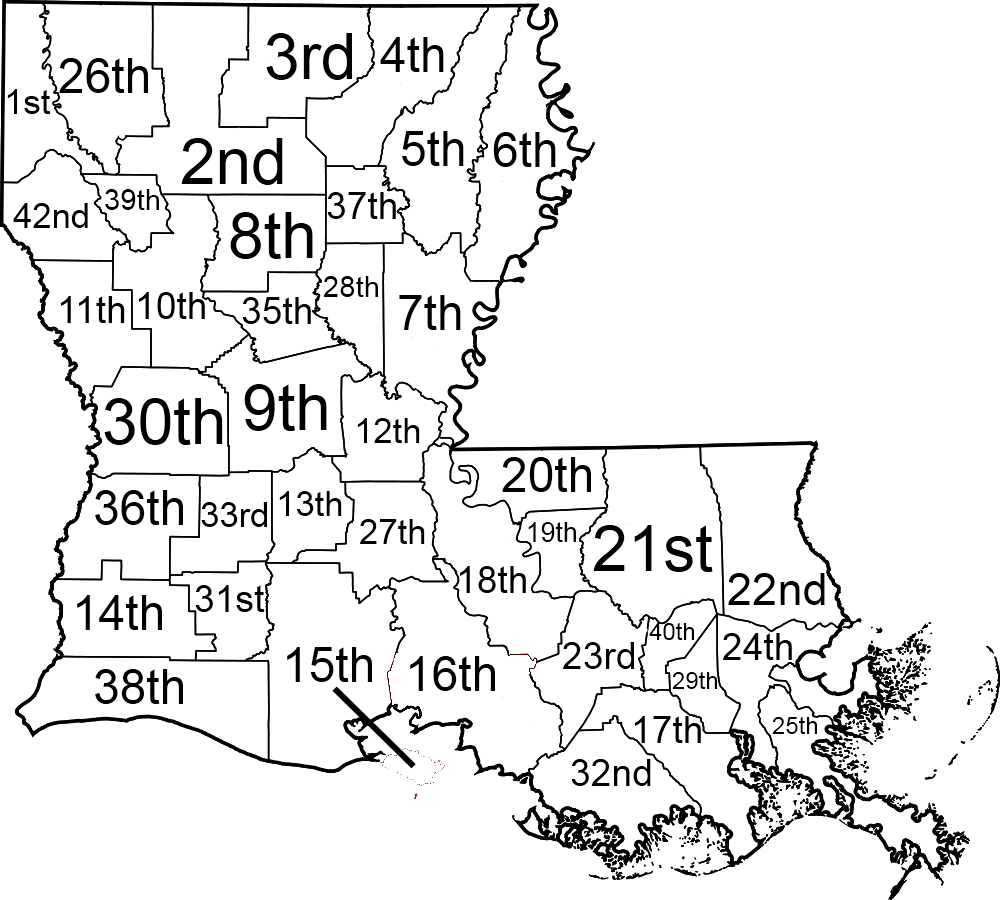
Map of Louisiana judicial districts.

=== Supreme Court ===
The Supreme Court of Louisiana is the highest court and court of last resort. It is composed of seven justices and meets in the French Quarter of New Orleans.

The Court has original jurisdiction over matters arising from disciplinary matters involving the bench and bar. The Court has exclusive appellate jurisdiction over any case where a law or ordinance of this state has been declared unconstitutional or when a defendant has been convicted of a capital crime and the death penalty has actually been imposed. The Court has general supervisory and rule making authority over all the lower state courts. Death penalty appeals are taken as a matter of right. All other review of lower courts in the state is obtained by the writ of certiorari process. The Louisiana Supreme Court may entertain recommendations from the Judiciary Commission of Louisiana on certain questions involving judges.

Judges serve for ten years.

The Court has promulgated the Rules of the Louisiana Supreme Court and the Rules of the Judiciary Commission of Louisiana.

The Judicial Council of the Supreme Court of Louisiana serves as a research arm for the Supreme Court and often acts as a resource center where ideas for simplifying and expediting judicial procedures and/or correcting shortcomings in the system are studied.

=== Courts of Appeal ===
The Louisiana Circuit Courts of Appeal are the intermediate appellate courts and have appellate jurisdiction over all civil matters, all matters appealed from family and juvenile courts, and most criminal cases that are triable by a jury. A court of appeal also has supervisory jurisdiction to review interlocutory orders and decrees in cases which are heard in the trial courts within their circuits.

There are five circuits. Each circuit is subdivided into three districts.

Judges serve for ten years.

=== District courts ===
The District courts of Louisiana are the main trial courts of general jurisdiction.

=== Parish and city courts ===
The parish and city courts hear misdemeanor, juvenile, traffic, small claims, and family law cases.

=== Mayors' courts ===
The Louisiana Mayors' Courts hears misdemeanor and traffic cases, as well as utility debts within the municipality of less than $5,000.

=== Justice of the Peace Courts ===
The Justice of the Peace Courts of Louisiana hear small claims cases.

== Administration ==
The Chief Justice of the Louisiana Supreme Court is the chief administrator of the judiciary of Louisiana.

The Judiciary Commission of Louisiana may recommend the Supreme Court censure, suspend with or without salary, remove from office, or involuntarily retire a judge for willful misconduct relating to his official duty, willful and persistent failure to perform his duty, persistent and public conduct prejudicial to the administration of justice that brings the judicial office into disrepute, and conduct while in office which would constitute a felony, or conviction of a felony, as well as disqualify a judge from exercising any judicial function, without loss of salary, during pending disciplinary proceedings in the Supreme Court, and involuntarily retire a judge for disability that seriously interferes with the performance of his duties and that is or is likely to become permanent. The Commission consists of nine members who shall serve four-year terms: one court of appeal judge and two district judges selected by the Supreme Court; two attorneys admitted to the practice of law for at least ten years and one attorney admitted to the practice of law for at least three but not more than ten years, selected by the Conference of Court of Appeal judges; and three citizens, not lawyers, judges or public officials, selected by the Louisiana District Judges Association. It was created in 1968 by an amendment to Article I, constitution of 1921, and is continued in existence by Article V, Section 25, Constitution of 1974. The Judiciary Commission of Louisiana has promulgated the Code of Judicial Conduct of Louisiana, and is governed by the Rules of the Judiciary Commission of Louisiana as promulgated by the Supreme Court.

The Louisiana Attorney Disciplinary Board is tasked with the responsibility of investigating all allegations of lawyer misconduct and with the responsibility of making recommendations to the Court when discipline is warranted. It was established by the Supreme Court of Louisiana in 1990. The Board has promulgated the Louisiana Rules of Professional Conduct.

The Judicial Council of the Supreme Court of Louisiana serves as a research arm for the Supreme Court and often acts as a resource center where ideas for simplifying and expediting judicial procedures and/or correcting shortcomings in the system are studied.

== See also ==
- Courts of Louisiana
- Law enforcement in Louisiana
- List of first minority male lawyers and judges in Louisiana
- List of first women lawyers and judges in Louisiana
