= Clement Studebaker =

American manufacturer (1831–1901)

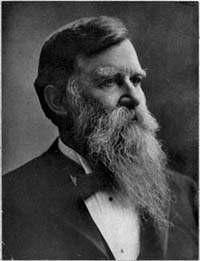
- Studebaker in a 1918 publication
- Born: March 12, 1831; East Berlin, Pennsylvania, U.S.
- Died: November 27, 1901 (aged 70); South Bend, Indiana, U.S.
- Resting place: Riverview Cemetery; South Bend, Indiana, U.S.
- Other name: Clem Studebaker
- Political party: Republican
- Spouses: Charity Bratt (m. 1852–1863) Anna Harper Milburn (m. 1864)
- Children: 5, including Clement Jr.
- Relatives: John Studebaker (brother); Peter Studebaker (brother)

Clement Studebaker (March 12, 1831 – November 27, 1901) was an American wagon and carriage manufacturer. With his brother Henry, he co-founded the H & C Studebaker Company, precursor of the Studebaker Corporation, which built Pennsylvania-German Conestoga wagons and carriages during his lifetime, and automobiles after his death, in South Bend, Indiana.

== Early life ==
Clement Studebaker was born on March 12, 1831, in East Berlin, Pennsylvania, to Rebecca (née Mohler) and John Studebaker. He was of Pennsylvania Dutch heritage. At a young age, he had learned to work as a blacksmith in his father's shop in Ashland, Ohio. At the age of twenty, Studebaker moved to Indiana and taught school in St. Joseph County, Indiana.

== Career ==
In 1851, Studebaker worked at a threshing machine factory. In February 1852, Studebaker and his elder brother Henry Studebaker opened the H. & C. Studebaker blacksmith shop at the corner of Michigan and Jefferson Streets in what is now the heart of downtown South Bend, Indiana.

In 1858, Henry's interest in the business was bought out by a younger brother John Mohler Studebaker. At that time, the brothers were filling wagon orders for the United States Army, which they continued throughout the Civil War. As a Dunkard, Henry was a committed pacifist and may have objected to having a part in making war materials. An official Studebaker company history simply says "Henry was tired of the business. He wanted to farm. The risks of expanding were not for him". Studebaker and three other brothers formed Studebaker Brothers Manufacturing Company. The company was incorporated in 1868 and Studebaker served as president. It would become the largest wagon manufacturer in the world and the only manufacturer of horse-drawn vehicles to successfully switch to automobiles.

Studebaker was a commissioner from Indiana to the Paris Exposition in 1878 and the World Cotton Centennial in New Orleans. He served as president of the board of world fair's managers at Chicago in 1893. Studebaker was a Republican. He was a delegate from the South Bend district to the 1880 Republican National Convention and an at-large state delegate to the 1888 Republican National Convention. President Benjamin Harrison appointed Studebaker to the Pan-American Conference in 1889–1890. He served as a member of the South Bend City Council from 1870 to 1872.

Studebaker was a member and served as president of the Carriage Builders' National Association. He was a member of the board of trustees of DePauw University. He served as a member and president of the Chautauqua Assembly.

== Personal life ==
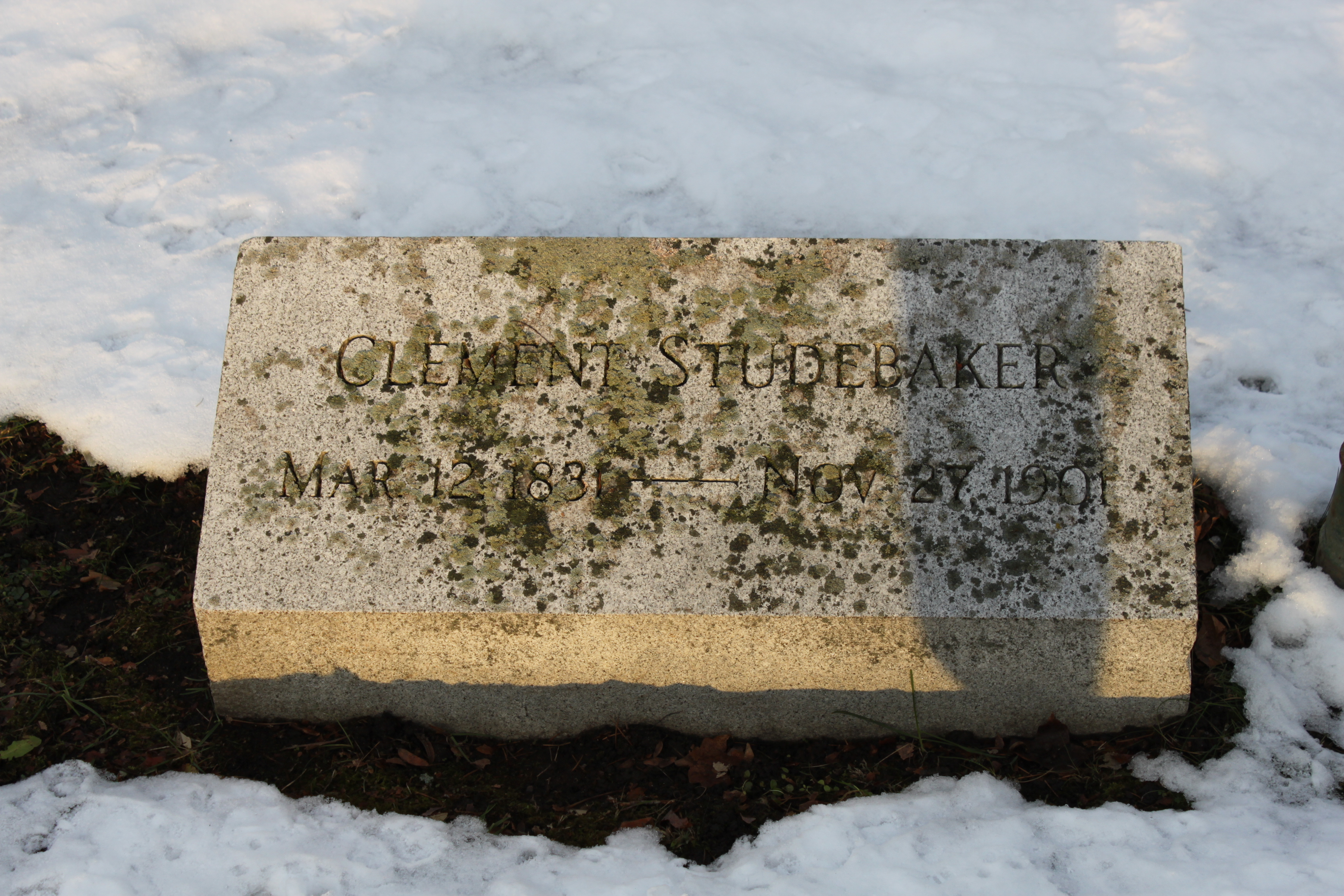
Grave of Studebaker at Riverview Cemetery

Studebaker married Charity Bratt on October 12, 1852, in St. Joseph County, Indiana. The couple had two children, Clems and Eddie, who both died in infancy. His wife died on March 17, 1863, in South Bend. Studebaker married Anna Harper Milburn in September 1864, in South Bend. His wife's father was George Milburn, president of the Milburn Wagon Company. This marriage produced three children: George Milburn Studebaker (1865–1939), Anne Studebaker Carlisle (1868–1931) and Clement Studebaker Jr. (1871–1932). George and Clement Jr. founded the South Bend Watch Company.

Studebaker was a Methodist and was twice a delegate to the General Conference of the Methodist church. He also went by the name "Clem".

In spring of 1900, Studebaker traveled Europe and traveled to Aix-les-Bains in southern France under the advice of Andrew Carnegie and J. P. Morgan. Studebaker died at his home in South Bend on November 27, 1901. Studebaker was buried at the Studebaker-Milburn Mausoleum at the South Bend City Cemetery. Some of the Studebakers were moved from the City Cemetery and Studebaker was buried at Riverview Cemetery in South Bend.

== Legacy ==
Several months after Studebaker's death in 1901, St. Paul's Memorial United Methodist Church was completed in South Bend. Studebaker had contributed the funds to build the church in memory of his father-in-law, George Milburn. The completed church was dedicated in 1903.

In 1911, Studebaker acquired the Everitt-Metzker-Flanders Company of Detroit, later forming the Studebaker Corporation. The late Clement's son, Clement Studebaker Jr., had served on the E-M-F Company's board and at some time had a position on Studebaker's board.

By 1916 Clement Studebaker Jr. had also become president and chairman of the utility, North American Light and Power Company. He served in other executive positions as well, including as the president and chairman of the Illinois Power and Light Company (and of its subsidiary, the Illinois Traction Company), as well as treasurer of the Chicago and South Bend Railroad.

In 1889, Clement Studebaker completed construction of a 26,000-square-foot (2,400 m^{2}) mansion on West Washington Street in South Bend and named it Tippecanoe Place (probably in honor of the Family settlement near Tipp City, Ohio). The mansion has been carefully restored and converted to a restaurant.
