= North American Light and Power Company =

The North American Light and Power Company was a utility holding company formed in South Bend, Indiana and run since 1916 by its president, Clement Studebaker, Jr., of the family famous for the Studebaker automobiles. The utility company remained a major subsidiary of the North American Company, until that conglomerate's 1940s breakup by the U.S. Securities and Exchange Commission (SEC).

== History ==
Clement Studebaker, Jr. (1871–1932) was born the son of Clement Studebaker (1831–1901), the carriage and automobile manufacturer of South Bend, Indiana.

In 1911, the company founded by the Studebaker brothers joined forces with Everitt-Metzker-Flanders Company of Detroit to form the Studebaker Corporation. In one of his several executive positions, Clement Studebaker, Jr. served as Vice President of the E-M-F Company.

By 1916 Clement Studebaker, Jr. had formed the publicly traded North American Light and Power Company, and issued stock, with certificates printed by the American Banknote Company.

Clement Studebaker, Jr. also served as president and chairman of the board of the Illinois Power and Light Company (and of its subsidiary, the Illinois Traction Company), the South Bend Watch Company, and as treasurer of the Chicago South Shore and South Bend Railroad.

=== North American Company ===
North American Company had once been one of the original stocks in the Dow Jones Industrial Average.

North American Light and Power remained under the ownership of North American Company for the next decade after Clement's death, as a major subsidiary holding company of other lines.

By 1940, North American Company had become a US$2.3 billion holding company heading up a pyramid of by then 80 companies. It controlled ten major direct subsidiaries in eight of which it owned at least 79%. North American Light and Power Company was by then one of the three major holding companies among the ten direct subsidiaries.

North American Company was broken up by the SEC, following the United States Supreme Court decision of April 1, 1946.
