= North American Company =

Former public utility holding company

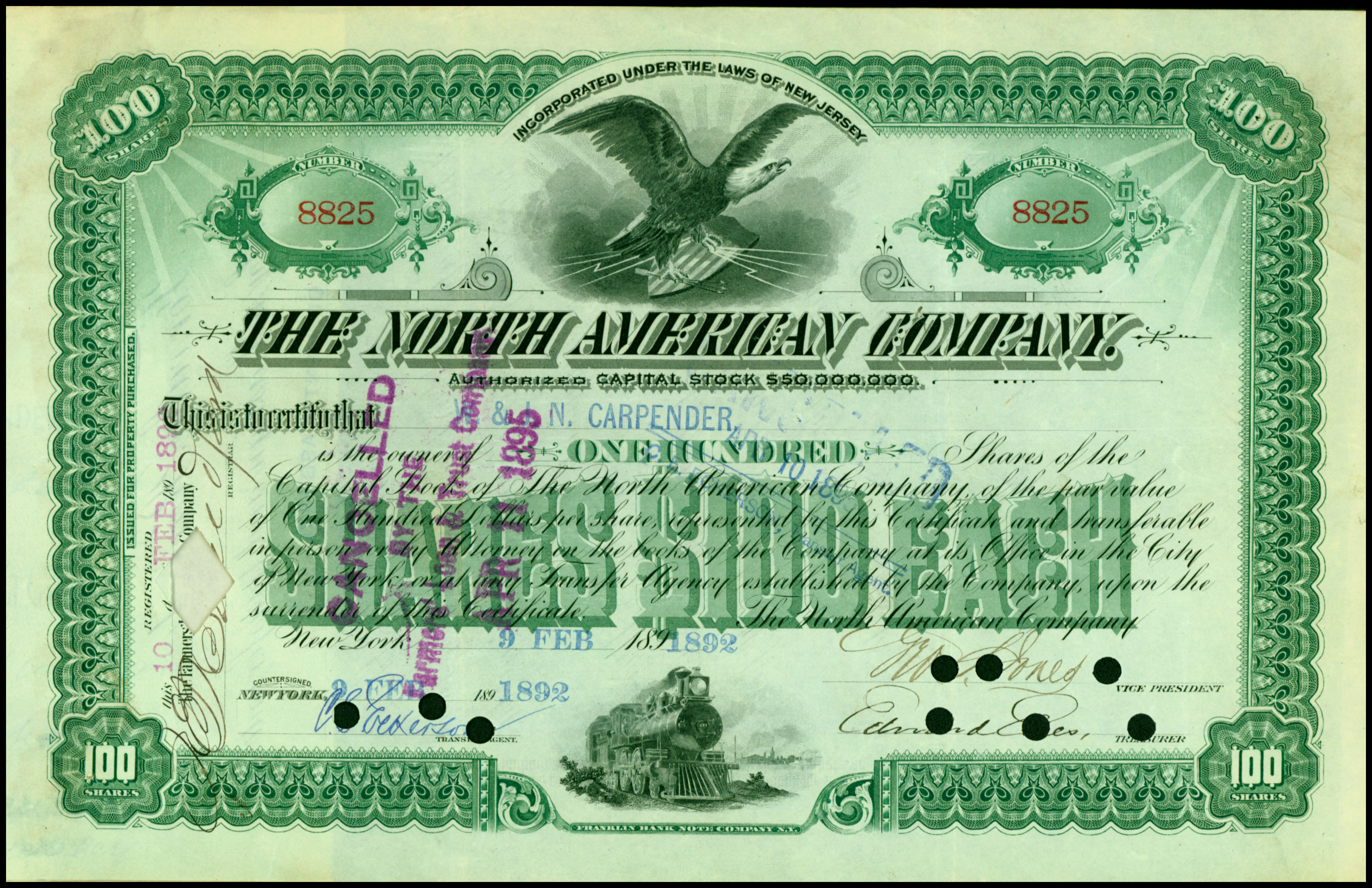
Share of the North American Company, issued on February 9, 1892

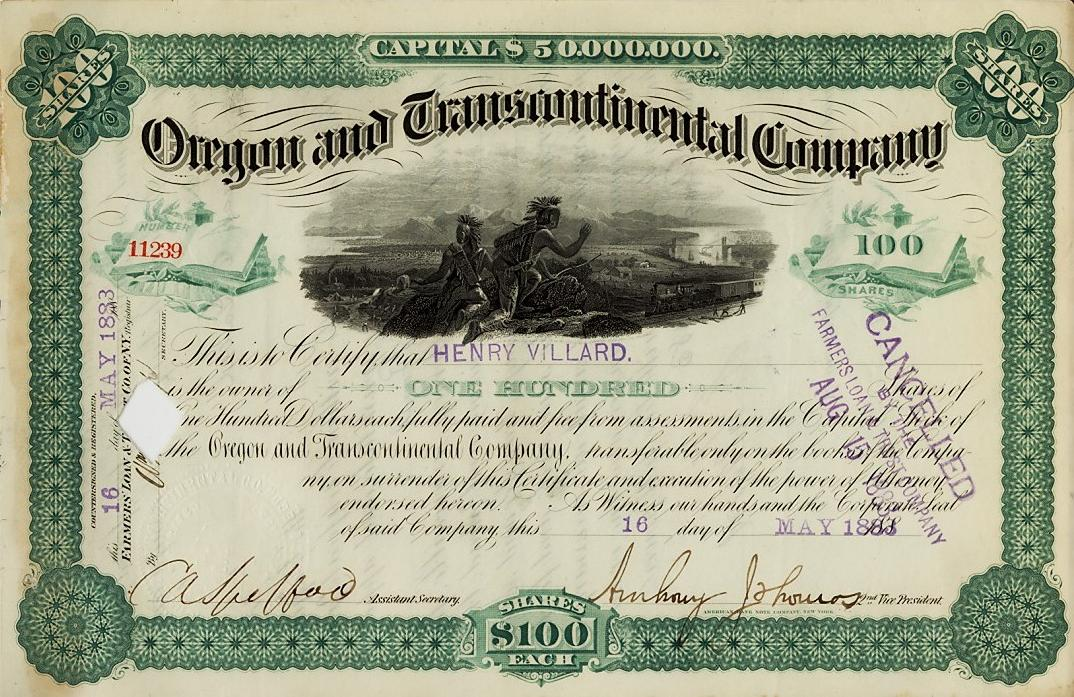
Oregon and Transcontinental stock owned by Henry Villard

The North American Company was a holding company incorporated in New Jersey on June 14, 1890, and controlled by Henry Villard, to succeed to the assets and property of the Oregon and Transcontinental Company. It owned public utilities and public transport companies and was broken up in 1946, largely to comply with the Public Utility Holding Company Act of 1935.

Its headquarters were at 60 Broadway in Manhattan.

== History ==
In 1889, the New Jersey legislature passed legislation to facilitate the control of other companies by another corporation. This was part of a bid to entice trusts to convert into holding companies and move to New Jersey. It persuaded the Oregon company Oregon and Transcontinental to re-incorporate as a holding company in New Jersey and became the North American Company.

When the Dow Jones Industrial Average was created on May 26, 1896, North American's stock was one of the 12 component stocks, but it was replaced on August 26 by U.S. Cordage. On October 1, 1928, when the number of stocks comprising the DJIA was increased to 30, North American was re-added to the list but was replaced by Johns-Manville in 1930.

By 1940, North American was a US$2.3 billion holding company that directly and indirectly ran 80 companies.

It had 10 major direct subsidiaries, in eight of which it owned at least 79%. The 10 included:

- Three major holding companies:
  - Union Electric Company of St. Louis, Missouri
  - Washington Railway and Electric Company
  - North American Light and Power Company
- Four operating companies:
  - Cleveland Electric Illuminating Company
  - Pacific Gas and Electric
  - Detroit Edison Company
  - Wisconsin Electric Power Company
- And three others:
  - North American Utility Securities Corporation
  - West Kentucky Coal Company
  - 60 Broadway Building Corporation

At various times during its existence, North American also owned substantial interests in these other companies as well:

- The Milwaukee Electric Railway and Light Company: Formed in 1896 as a subsidiary of the North American Company. By 1929, it operated within North American Company along with Wisconsin Electric Power Company, which became the consolidated name of the two operating companies in 1938. It now belongs to Wisconsin Energy Corporation (NYSE: WEC)
- Capital Transit: Formed on December 1, 1933, in Washington, D.C., from the merger of the Washington Railway and Electric Company and Capital Traction streetcar companies and the Washington Rapid Transit bus company. North American owned it through its WRECo holding company subsidiary, which in turn was the holding company for the merged lines, owning 50% of Capital Transit.

- Potomac Electric Power Company
- Cincinnati Gas & Electric Company
- Union Light, Heat and Power of Covington, Kentucky
- Northern Natural Gas Company
- Butte Electric and Power Company
- Laclede Gas Company
- Edison Securities Corporation
- Wired Radio, Inc. (Muzak)
- North American Edison Company
- St. Louis United Railways Company

=== Breakup ===
The Public Utility Holding Company Act of 1935 passed with the intent of breaking up interstate electric holding companies by limiting company operations to a single state, thus subjecting them to effective state regulation. The North American Company fought the legislation in court, and the company was not broken up by the Securities and Exchange Commission until their loss before the Supreme court in North American Co. v. SEC on April 1, 1946.

== See also ==
- John I. Beggs (former director)
- Clement Studebaker Jr. (chairman of North American Light and Power Co)
