= Bell v. Hood =

- Supreme Court of the United States

Argued January 29, 1946 Decided April 1, 1946
- Full case name: Arthur L. Bell, et al., v. Richard B. Hood, et al.
- Citations: 327 U.S. 678 (more)

Case history
- Prior: Bell v. Hood, 150 F.2d 96 (9th Cir. 1945)
- Subsequent: Bell v. Hood, 71 F. Supp. 813 (S.D. Cal. 1947)

Holding
- Individuals have an implied cause of action under the Fourth and Fifth Amendment against federal government officials who have violated those constitutional rights.

Court membership
- Chief Justice Harlan F. Stone Associate Justices Hugo Black · Stanley F. Reed; Felix Frankfurter · William O. Douglas; Frank Murphy · Robert H. Jackson; Wiley B. Rutledge · Harold H. Burton

Case opinions
- Majority: Black, joined by Reed, Douglas, Frankfurter, Murphy, Rutledge
- Dissent: Stone, joined by Burton
- Jackson took no part in the consideration or decision of the case.

Laws applied
- V Amendment, IV Amendment

Bell v. Hood, 327 U.S. 678 (1946), was a Supreme Court case in which the court held that individuals have an implied cause of action under the Fourth Amendment and Fifth Amendment to recover damages against federal government officials who violate those rights. The court further held that federal courts must entertain such suits unless they are frivolous, or solely for the purpose of that court gaining jurisdiction over the suit.

This case was the precursor to the famous Bivens v. Six Unknown Named Agents, 403 U.S. 388 (1971) case, and is largely what the Bivens case was based upon.

== Historical Context ==
This case begins in the U.S. District Court for the Southern District of California, when plaintiff Arthur Bell alleges that on December 18, 1942, various federal and local law enforcement officials searched the homes of various members of the Mankind United cult—of which Bell was the leader—who were each indicted for violating 50 U.S. Code § 34, or use of mail for fraud. (since moved) Bell alleged they searched and seized the plaintiffs without an arrest or search warrant, and unreasonably delayed their first appearance before a judge.

Bell sued, naming SAC Richard B. Hood of the Federal Bureau of Investigation as the named plaintiff, and also included 36 other FBI agents and one Merle Armstrong, who was a police officer with the Los Angeles Police Department. The district court, however, disagreed Bell's contention that his suit arose "under the Constitution or the laws of the United States", and ultimately dismissed it for want of federal jurisdiction. On April 30, 1945, Bell filed a motion for remand with the U.S. Court of Appeals for the Ninth Circuit.

== Court of Appeals Decision ==
The Court of Appeals took up Bell's motion, and in a unanimous decision ruled against Bell, and affirmed the district court's order. The court's opinion, written by Judge Albert L. Stephens Sr. and joined by Judges Clifton Mathews and Homer Bone, was released on October 22, 1945. The court emphasized its sympathy with Bell's situation, saying that, "if the allegations have any foundation in truth, the plaintiffs' legal rights have been ruthlessly violated." This, however, was not enough to save Bell's appeal, and the court concluded that,

"We are of the opinion and so hold that the trial court did not err in holding that the action does not arise under the Constitution or laws of the United States.."

Bell then filed a petition for writ of certiorari in the Supreme Court to appeal once more.

== Supreme Court Decision ==
The Supreme Court granted certiorari, and held oral arguments on January 29, 1945, and handed down its decision on April 1, 1945. The majority opinion, written by Justice Hugo Black, reversed the Ninth Circuit's decision, holding that,

"Where [a] complaint seeks recovery squarely on the ground of violation of plaintiffs' rights under the Fourth and Fifth Amendments, a federal district court has jurisdiction of a suit against agents of the Federal Government to recover damages...even though neither the Constitution nor the Congress has provided for the recovery of money damages for such violations and the complaint is so framed as possibly to state a common law action in tort or trespass."

One of the main issues in contention was the respondent's argument that,

"petitioners could not recover under the Constitution or laws of the United States, since the Constitution does not expressly provide for recovery in money damages for violations of the Fourth and Fifth Amendments and Congress has not enacted a statute that does so provide."

On that point, the court stated,

"[T]he issue thus raised has sufficient merit to warrant exercise of federal jurisdiction for purposes of adjudicating it..this Court has sustained the jurisdiction of the district courts in suits brought to recover damages for depriving a citizen of the right to vote in violation of the Constitution...Moreover, where federally protected rights have been invaded, it has been the rule from the beginning that courts will be alert to adjust their remedies so as to grant the necessary relief."

With that, the Supreme Court reversed the Ninth Circuit's decision, and remanded the case for further proceedings.

=== Stone's Dissent ===
Chief Justice Harlan F. Stone, who was joined by Justice Harold H. Burton, filed a dissenting opinion. The dissent can be summarized as follows,

"The district court is without jurisdiction as a federal court unless the complaint states a cause of action arising under the Constitution or laws of the United States..But where as here, neither the constitutional provision nor any act of Congress affords a remedy to any person, the mere assertion by a plaintiff that he is entitled to such a remedy cannot be said to satisfy jurisdictional requirements..because no cause of action under the Constitution or laws of the United States was stated." "The only effect of holding, as the Court does, that jurisdiction is conferred by the pleader's unfounded assertion that he is one who can have a remedy for damages arising under the Fourth and Fifth Amendments is to transfer to the federal court the trial of the allegations of trespass to person and property..[and] the district court will be required to pass upon the question whether the facts stated by petitioners give rise to a cause of action for trespass under state law."
