= Shoemaker v. United States =

- Supreme Court of the United States

Argued November 28–29, 1892 Decided January 18, 1893
- Full case name: Shoemaker v. United States
- Citations: 147 U.S. 282 (more)

Holding
- Congress may increase the duties of an existing office without rendering it necessary that the incumbent again be appointed as long as the new duties are germane to those the office already holds.

Court membership
- Chief Justice Melville Fuller Associate Justices Stephen J. Field · John M. Harlan; Horace Gray · Samuel Blatchford; Lucius Q. C. Lamar II · David J. Brewer; Henry B. Brown · George Shiras Jr.

Case opinion
- Majority: Shiras, joined by unanimous

Laws applied
- U.S. Const. art. II, § 2, cl. 2

Shoemaker v. United States, 147 U.S. 282 (1893), was a landmark decision of the Supreme Court of the United States on the United States Constitution's Appointments Clause. The Court declared Congress may expand the duties of an existing office without rendering it necessary that the incumbent again be nominated, confirmed and appointed as long as the new duties are "germane" to those already held by the office.

== See also ==
- List of United States Supreme Court cases, volume 147
