= United States v. Johnson (1946) =

- Supreme Court of the United States

Argued January 2, 1946 Decided February 4, 1946
- Full case name: United States v. Johnson; United States v. Sommers et al.
- Citations: 327 U.S. 106 (more) 66 S. Ct. 464; 90 L. Ed. 562; 46-1 U.S. Tax Cas. (CCH) ¶ 9155; 36 A.F.T.R. (P-H) 14; 1946-1 C.B. 122

Case history
- Prior: 149 F.2d 31 (7th Cir. 1945); cert. granted, 326 U.S. 702 (1945).
- Subsequent: Rehearing denied, 327 U.S. 817 (1946).

Court membership
- Chief Justice Harlan F. Stone Associate Justices Hugo Black · Stanley F. Reed; Felix Frankfurter · William O. Douglas; Frank Murphy · Robert H. Jackson; Wiley B. Rutledge · Harold H. Burton

Case opinion
- Majority: Black, joined by Stone, Reed, Frankfurter, Douglas, Rutledge, Burton
- Jackson and Murphy took no part in the consideration or decision of the case.

United States v. Johnson, 327 U.S. 106 (1946), was a United States Supreme Court case.

== Procedural background ==
The case was decided alongside United States v. Sommers et al. Respondents in both cases were convicted of violations of penal provisions of the Revenue Acts and for conspiracy. The Seventh Circuit reversed. The Supreme Court reversed and remanded to the circuit court of appeals. That court remanded the case to the district court to permit a motion for a new trial on the ground of newly discovered evidence. That motion was made and denied. The circuit court of appeals affirmed. Respondents petitioned this Court for certiorari, but the petition was dismissed on motion of their counsel.

After obtaining a second remand from the circuit court of appeals on the ground of still further newly discovered evidence, respondents filed in the district court an amended motion for a new trial. That motion was denied. The circuit court of appeals reversed. The Supreme Court granted certiorari.

Petitioners contended that their convictions were improper because they were based on perjured testimony.

== Opinion of the court ==
The Supreme Court agreed, holding that the district court properly found that there was no prejudiced testimony. According to the Court, the appellate court improperly substituted its own finding that the challenged witness's original testimony was unerringly false and that the trial court's contrary conclusion amounted to an abuse of discretion. The court concluded that no reviewable issue of law was presented and that the appeal should have been dismissed as frivolous.
