= Taxation of illegal income in the United States =

Taxation of illegal income in the United States arises from the provisions of the Internal Revenue Code, enacted by the U.S. Congress in part for the purpose of taxing net income. As such, a person's taxable income will generally be subject to the same federal income tax rules, regardless of whether the income was obtained legally or illegally.

== Notable cases ==
Al Capone was successfully prosecuted for tax evasion. Additionally, Soviet spy Aldrich Ames, who had earned more than $2 million cash for his espionage, was convicted of tax evasion in 1994 as none of the Soviet money was reported on his tax returns. Ames, who represented himself in subsequent Tax Court proceedings in 1999, argued that he should not have to pay tax penalties because he had failed to report the income due to fraud instead of negligence, but the judge did not accept that argument.

=== 5th Amendment ===
The United States Supreme Court has ruled that requiring a person to declare income on a federal income tax return does not violate an individual's right to remain silent (United States v. Sullivan), although the privilege may apply to allow the person to refrain from revealing the source of the income.

== Income ==
In James v. United States (1961), the Supreme Court held that an embezzler was required to include his ill-gotten gains in his "gross income" for Federal income tax purposes. In reaching this decision, the Court looked to the seminal case setting forth the tax code's definition of gross income, Commissioner of Internal Revenue v. Glenshaw Glass Co., in which the Supreme Court held that a taxpayer has gross income when he has "an accession to wealth, clearly realized, and over which the taxpayers have complete dominion". At the time the embezzler acquired the funds, he did not have a consensual obligation to repay, or any restriction as to his disposition of the funds. If he had acquired the funds under the same circumstances legally, there would have been no question as to whether he should have gross income. Therefore, the embezzler had gross income under the tax code, even though the application of another body of law would later force him to return the money.

== Deductible expenses in illegal activity – the general rule ==
While embezzlers, thieves, and the like are forced to report their illegally acquired income for tax purposes, they may also take deductions for costs relating to criminal activity. For example, in Commissioner v. Tellier, a taxpayer was found guilty of engaging in business activities that violated the Securities Act of 1933. The taxpayer subsequently deducted the legal fees he spent while defending himself. The U.S. Supreme Court held that the taxpayer was allowed to deduct the legal fees from his gross income because they meet the requirements of §162(a), which allows the taxpayer to deduct all the "ordinary and necessary expenses paid or incurred during the taxable year in carrying on a trade or business." The Court reasoned (and the Internal Revenue Service did not contest the point) that it was ordinary and necessary for a person engaged in a business to expect to have legal fees associated with that business, even though such things may only happen once in a lifetime. Therefore, the taxpayer in Tellier was allowed to deduct his legal fees from his gross income, even though he incurred the fees because of his crime. The U.S. Supreme Court in Tellier reiterated that the purpose of the tax code was to tax net income, not punish unlawful behavior. The Court suggested that if this was not the case, Congress would change the tax code to include special tax rules for illegal conduct.

=== Expenses that are not deductible ===
Deductions relating to unlawful conduct may be disallowed when to allow them would sharply frustrate a national or state policy prohibiting such conduct.

Congress may impose specific provisions that prohibit deductions in connection with illegal activity or other violations of law. No deduction is allowed for fines or similar penalties paid to a government for the violation of any law.

Internal Revenue Code section 280E specifically denies a deduction or credit for any expense in a business consisting of trafficking in illegal drugs "prohibited by Federal law or the law of any State in which such trade or business is conducted."

Similarly, no business deduction is allowed "for any payment made, directly or indirectly, to an official or employee of any government [ . . . ] if the payment constitutes an illegal bribe or kickback or, if the payment is to an official or employee of a foreign government, the payment is unlawful under the Foreign Corrupt Practices Act of 1977." Similarly, tax deductions and credits are denied where for illegal bribes, illegal kickbacks, or other illegal payments under any Federal law, or under a State if such State law is generally enforced, if the law "subjects the payor to a criminal penalty or the loss of license or privilege to engage in a trade or business." No deduction is allowed for kickbacks, rebates, or bribes made by those who furnish items or services for which payment may be made under the Social Security Act.

=== Medical marijuana: Treatment of deductions for expenses in business legalized under state laws ===
Recently, the provisions of Internal Revenue Code section 280E are being applied by the Internal Revenue Service (IRS) to businesses operating in the medical marijuana industry. Section 280E provides:

No deduction or credit shall be allowed for any amount paid or incurred during the taxable year in carrying on any trade or business if such trade or business (or the activities which comprise such trade or business) consists of trafficking in controlled substances (within the meaning of schedule I and II of the Controlled Substances Act) which is prohibited by Federal law or the law of any State in which such trade or business is conducted.

A person with income from selling a Schedule I substance is allowed to take a tax deduction for the cost of goods sold but not any other tax deductions. Unlike for other business activities, tax deductions are not allowed for ordinary and necessary business expenses such as rent, utilities, and advertising.

Even though 38 states and the District of Columbia have medical marijuana laws (with 24 of those states and D.C. now allowing marijuana to be consumed without a doctor recommendation), the IRS is applying section 280E to deny business deductions. Businesses operating legally under state law argue that section 280E should not be applied because Congress did not intend the law to apply to businesses that are legal under state law. The IRS asserts that it was the intent of Congress to apply the provision to anyone "trafficking" in a controlled substance, as defined under federal law (as stated in the text of the statute). Thus, section 280E is at the center of the conflict between federal and state laws with respect to medical marijuana.

This is still the case when the marijuana is medical marijuana recommended by a physician as appropriate to benefit the health of the user, as explained by the United States Tax Court in Californians Helping to Alleviate Med. Problems, Inc. v. Commissioner ("CHAMP").
