= Mōkapu Point =

Location in Kāneʻohe, O'ahu in Honolulu County, Hawaii

Mōkapu Point is located on the Mokapu Peninsula in Kāneʻohe, Oʻahu in Honolulu County, Hawaii. In Hawaiian lore, it is the birthplace of mankind and considered sacred ground. Once a place for the people of Hawaii, it is now a US Marine Corps base.

In 1918, through Executive Order 2900, then president, Woodrow Wilson designated 322 acres in the central portion of Mōkapu Peninsula as the U.S. Army’s Kuwaaohe Military Reservation. Now Mōkapu Point is part of the Marine Corps Base Hawaii. The area hosts a nesting colony of red-footed boobies. Geologically it is a segment of a former caldera that was part of the prehistoric Ko'olau Volcano. Access is limited and allowed for authorized biological studies or military purposes.
