= James v. United States (1961) =

- Supreme Court of the United States

Argued November 17, 1960 Decided May 15, 1961
- Full case name: James v. United States
- Citations: 366 U.S. 213 (more) 81 S. Ct. 1052; 6 L. Ed. 2d 246; 1961 U.S. LEXIS 2014; 61-1 U.S. Tax Cas. (CCH) ¶ 9449; 7 A.F.T.R.2d (RIA) 1361; 1961-2 C.B. 9

Case history
- Prior: Certiorari to the United States Court of Appeals for the Seventh Circuit

Holding
- Ill-gotten gains are taxable income even if they must be repaid.

Court membership
- Chief Justice Earl Warren Associate Justices Hugo Black · Felix Frankfurter; William O. Douglas · Tom C. Clark; John M. Harlan II · William J. Brennan Jr. Charles E. Whittaker · Potter Stewart

Case opinions
- Plurality: Warren, joined by Brennan, Stewart
- Concur/dissent: Black, joined by Douglas
- Concur/dissent: Clark
- Concur/dissent: Harlan, joined by Frankfurter
- Concur/dissent: Whittaker, joined by Black, Douglas

Laws applied
- U.S. Const., U.S. Const. amend. XVI; I.R.C. § 61 (26 U.S.C. § 61)

James v. United States, 366 U.S. 213 (1961), was a case in which the United States Supreme Court held that the receipt of money obtained by a taxpayer illegally was taxable income even though the law might require the taxpayer to repay the ill-gotten gains to the person from whom they had been taken.

== Facts ==
The defendant, Eugene James, was an official in a labor union who had embezzled more than $738,000 in union funds, and did not report the amounts on his tax return. He was tried for tax evasion and claimed in his defense that embezzled funds were not taxable income. His argument was that just as the receipt of loan proceeds is not taxable to the borrower because of the borrower's corresponding obligation to repay the loan, the person who embezzles money should not be treated as having received income since that person is legally required to return those funds to their rightful owner.

Indeed, Eugene James pointed out that the Supreme Court had made such a determination in Commissioner v. Wilcox. However, the defense was unavailing in the trial court, which Eugene James and sentenced him to three years in prison.

== Issue ==
The Supreme Court was called upon to determine whether the receipt of embezzled funds was income taxable to the wrongdoer, despite an obligation to repay.

== Holding ==
The Supreme Court ruled that under section 22(a) of the Internal Revenue Code of 1939 and section 61(a) of the Internal Revenue Code of 1954, the receipt of embezzled funds was included in the gross income of the wrongdoer and was taxable to the wrongdoer even though the wrongdoer was required to return the funds to the rightful owner.

== Rationale ==
The Court was divided between several different rationales. The majority opinion was written by Chief Justice Earl Warren, joined by Justices Brennan and Stewart. That opinion held that if a taxpayer receives income legally or illegally without consensual recognition of obligation to repay, the income is taxable.

The Court noted that the scope of the Sixteenth Amendment was not limited to "lawful" income, a distinction that had been found in the Revenue Act of 1913. The absence of the "lawful" modifier indicated that the framers of the Sixteenth Amendment had intended no safe harbor for illegal income. The Court expressly overruled Commissioner v. Wilcox and ruled that James was liable for the federal income tax that was due on his embezzled funds. The Court also ruled, however, that Eugene James could not be held liable for the willful tax evasion because it is not possible to violate laws willfully that were not established at the time of the violation.

== Concurrences and dissents ==
Justice Whittaker, joined by Justice Black and Justice Douglas, wrote an opinion concurring in the dismissal of the indictment against James but dissenting from the overruling of Wilcox. Justice Black raised an argument on federalism that the ruling was a preemption of state criminal jurisdiction.

Justice Harlan, joined by Justice Frankfurter, wrote an opinion concurring with the overruling of Wilcox but contending that James should have been set for a new trial, rather than set free of criminal liability. Justice Clark wrote a brief concurrence, also agreeing with the overruling of Wilcox but also stating that James's conviction should have been upheld.

== Aftermath ==
Although Eugene James avoided criminal liability, the Supreme Court left James in a situation In which he would be required not only to repay the embezzled $738,000 to the union but also to pay federal income taxes on the receipt of those funds, just as if he had been able to keep them.

== See also ==
- Taxation of illegal income in the United States
- List of United States Supreme Court cases, volume 366
