= Law of Louisiana =

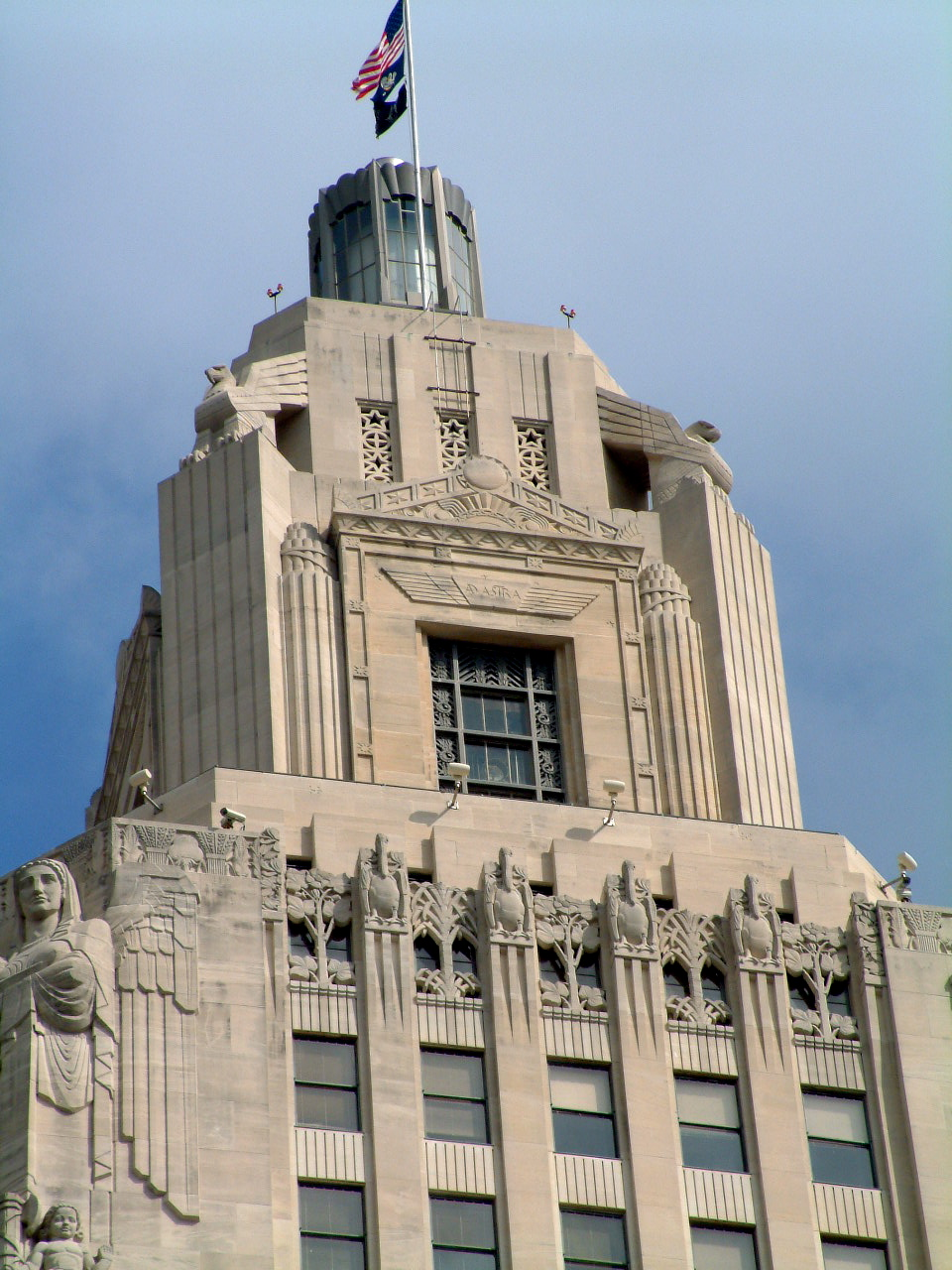
Louisiana State Capitol, Baton Rouge, Louisiana

Law in the state of Louisiana is based on a more diverse set of sources than the laws of the other 49 states of the United States. Private law has a civil law character, based on French and Spanish codes and ultimately Roman law, with some common law influences. Louisiana is the only state whose private legal system is based on civil law, rather than the traditional American common law. Louisiana's criminal law, however, largely rests on common law. Louisiana's administrative law is generally similar to the administrative law of the federal government and other states. Louisiana's procedural law is generally in line with that of other U.S. states, which in turn is generally based on the U.S. Federal Rules of Civil Procedure.

== Sources ==
=== Legislation ===
The Louisiana Revised Statutes (R.S.) contain a significant amount of legislation, arranged in titles or codes. Apart from this, the Louisiana Civil Code forms the core of private law, the Louisiana Code of Civil Procedure (C.C.P.) governs civil procedure, the Louisiana Code of Criminal Procedure (C.Cr.P.) governs criminal procedure, the Louisiana Code of Evidence governs the law of evidence, the Criminal Code (CrC) governs criminal law, the Louisiana Children's Code (Ch.C.) governs family law and juvenile adjudication, the Louisiana Insurance Code governs insurance law including property damage claims.

=== Regulations ===
Page 3 of the January 2015 Louisiana Register

The Louisiana Administrative Code (LAC) contains the compilation of rules and regulations (delegated legislation) adopted by state agencies. The Louisiana Register is the monthly published official journal which provides access to the certified regulations and legal notices issued by the executive branch of the state government.

=== Judicial opinions ===
Since 1972, there is no longer an official case reporter and courts themselves decide which decisions are published. Decisions of the Louisiana Supreme Court and Louisiana Court of Appeal are available in paper and via the Internet, while trial court decisions are not published. The Code of Civil Procedure provides for the posting of unpublished opinions of the Supreme Court and the courts of appeal on the Internet and provides that such opinions may be cited as authority. Slip opinions are available from the courts, while advance sheets and bound volumes of the case reports are contained in the Louisiana Cases (a Louisiana-specific version of the Southern Reporter).

=== Local ordinances ===
The Louisiana Revised Statutes provide that the maximum penalty for the violation of a parish ordinance is a fine of $500 and imprisonment for 30 days in the parish jail, and that the maximum penalty for the violation of an ordinance of a municipality organized under the mayor and board of aldermen form of government is a fine of $500 and imprisonment for 60 days. A number of subjects are regulated, restricted, and preempted by state law as the subject of local ordinances.

== History ==
In 1664, under the royal charter creating the French East India Company, the Custom of Paris became the primary law in New France, supplemented with royal ordinances, e.g. the "Code Louis", consisting of the 1667 ordinance on civil procedure and 1670 ordinance on criminal procedure; the 1673 "Code Savary" on trade; and the 1685 Code noir on slavery. After the 1763 Spanish cession, however, this law was supplanted by the Spanish law contained in three primary texts: Nueva Recopilación de Castilla, Recopilación de las Indias, and the Siete Partidas. Commercial law was governed by the Ordinances of Bilbao. Other laws included: Leyes de Toro (1505), Fuero de Real, and the Fuero Juzgo.

The first Louisiana civil code, Digeste de la Loi Civile, was written in French by attorneys James Brown, Louis Moreau-Lislet, and Edward Livingston and subsequently translated into English as The Digest of the Civil Laws now in Force in the Territory of Orleans, or more commonly the Digest of 1808. The main drafter Louis Moreau-Lislet was a French colonial who originally hailed from Saint-Domingue (modern Haiti) but obtained his law degree in Paris just before the French Revolution of 1789. Enacted on March 31, 1808, the Digest proved problematic when in 1817 the Louisiana Supreme Court, composed of Pierre Derbigny, George Mathews (Chief Justice), and François Xavier Martin, found in Cottin v. Cottin that the Spanish law in force prior to the Digest's enactment had not been repealed and was therefore still in effect insofar as it did not contradict the Digest. This provoked a legislative response by the General Assembly who tasked Justice Derbigny and attorneys Moreau-Lislet and Livingston with drafting a new, fuller code written in French and English and which formally repealed prior existing law. This code, the Civil Code of 1825, was enacted on April 12, 1824.

For many years legal practitioners in the state made great effort to ensure that both versions agreed. Despite those efforts some clauses were found only in one version or the other. Due to modern legislative enactments which repeal and reenact Louisiana's civil code articles as any other collection of statutes, the differences between the original French and the English translation are now primarily of historical interest.

Despite popular belief that the Louisiana Civil Code derives from the Napoleonic Code, the similarities are because both stem from common sources, namely the 1800 Draft of the Napoleonic Code. The Napoleonic Code was not enacted in France until 1804, one year after the Louisiana Purchase. Historians in 1941 and 1965 discovered original notes of the 1808 Digest drafters who stated their goal was to base Louisiana law on Spanish law and who make no mention of the Napoleonic Code. The 1825 Code, however, which had the express purpose of repealing earlier Spanish law, elevated French law as the main source of Louisiana jurisprudence. Currently, the Louisiana Civil Code consists of 3,556 individual code articles.

== Effective differences ==
Great differences exist between Louisianan civil law and common law found in all other American states. While many differences have been bridged due to the strong influence of common law, the "civilian" tradition is still deeply rooted in Louisiana private law and in some parts of criminal law.

One often-cited distinction is that while common law courts are bound by stare decisis and tend to rule based on precedents, judges in Louisiana rule based on their own interpretation of the law. This distinction is not absolute, though. Civil law has its own respect for established precedent, the doctrine of jurisprudence constante. But the Louisiana Supreme Court notes the principal difference between the two legal doctrines: a single court decision can provide sufficient foundation for stare decisis; however, "a series of adjudicated cases, all in accord, form the basis for jurisprudence constante." Moreover, Louisiana Courts of Appeals have explicitly noted that jurisprudence constante is merely a secondary source of law, which cannot be authoritative and does not rise to the level of stare decisis.

Property, contractual, business entities structure, much of civil procedure, and family law are still strongly influenced by traditional Roman legal thinking. Louisiana law retains terms and concepts unique in American law: usufruct, forced heirship, redhibition, and lesion beyond moiety are a few examples.

Due to the civil law tradition, Louisiana's constitution does not contain a right to a trial by jury in civil cases, although this right is contained in the Louisiana Revised Statutes. Additionally, appellate courts have a much broader discretion to review findings of fact by juries in civil cases. Also, damages are apportioned differently from in common law jurisdictions; specific performance is almost always available, and juries may hear cases that would be considered equitable in other jurisdictions.

In commercial law, the 49 other states have completely adopted the Uniform Commercial Code (UCC), thereby standardizing the rules of commercial transactions. Louisiana enacted most provisions of the UCC, except for Articles 2 and 2A, which are inconsistent with civil law traditions governing the sale and lease of goods. However, several articles regarding the incorporation of terms into a contract have been adopted into the Civil Code. Louisiana also refers to the major subdivisions of the UCC as "chapters" instead of articles, since the term "articles" is used in that state to refer to provisions of the Louisiana Civil Code.

Legal careers are also molded by the differences. Legal education, the bar exam, and standards of legal practice in Louisiana are significantly different from other states. For example, the Louisiana Bar Exam is the longest of any state, at 21.5 hours. The Multistate Bar Examination is not administered in Louisiana.

== See also ==
- Constitution of Louisiana
- Louisiana Civil Code
- Quebec law
- Scots law
- Civil Law Commentaries
- Extra-dotal property
- Judiciary of Louisiana
- Law of Puerto Rico, which has similar influences
