= Ashcraft v. Tennessee (1944) =

- Supreme Court of the United States

Argued February 28, 1944 Decided May 1, 1944
- Full case name: E.E Ashcraft, et al. v. Tennessee
- Citations: 322 U.S. 143 (more) 64 S. Ct. 921; 88 L. Ed. 1192; 1944 U.S. LEXIS 782

Court membership
- Chief Justice Harlan F. Stone Associate Justices Owen Roberts · Hugo Black; Stanley F. Reed · Felix Frankfurter; William O. Douglas · Frank Murphy; Robert H. Jackson · Wiley B. Rutledge

Case opinions
- Majority: Black, joined by Stone, Reed, Douglas, Murphy, Rutledge
- Dissent: Jackson, joined by Roberts, Frankfurter

Ashcraft v. Tennessee, 322 U.S. 143 (1944), is a United States Supreme Court case.

The defendant in the case, E.E. Ashcraft, was charged with hiring John Ware to murder Ashcraft's wife, Zelma Ida Ashcraft. Ashcraft and Ware confessed to the crimes and were sentenced to 99 years in the state penitentiary. Ware and Ashcraft appealed, claiming that their confessions were extorted from them. Ware, a black man, claimed that he confessed because he feared mob violence. Ashcraft – who had been questioned for more than 36 hours, with only one 5-minute break – claimed he was threatened and abused.

The Supreme Court of Tennessee affirmed both men's convictions. However, neither they nor the original Trial Court ruled that the confessions were voluntarily made. On this question, they deferred to the jury, which had decided that the confessions were voluntary. After making an "independent examination", the United States Supreme Court reversed both convictions.

The Supreme Court said that this is unacceptable behavior and contrasted this behavior with the way other countries act towards its suspected criminals stating, "Certain foreign nations... convict individuals with testimony obtained by police organizations possessed of an unrestrained power to seize persons suspected of crimes against the state, hold them in secret custody, and wring from them confessions by physical or mental torture." The Court went on to say, "So long as the Constitution remains the basic law of our Republic, America will not have that kind of government."

Justices Jackson, Roberts and Frankfurter dissented because they felt the Supreme Court did not grant sufficient deference to the State Courts' rulings.

This case is important, in part, because of the Court's decision not to grant deference to the jury's determination that the defendants' confessions were voluntary.

== See also ==
- Ashcraft v. Tennessee (1946)
