= Ashcraft v. Tennessee (1946) =

- Supreme Court of the United States

Decided February 25, 1946
- Full case name: Ashcraft v. Tennessee
- Citations: 327 U.S. 274 (more)

Holding
- Admitting narrative testimony about the interrogation that elicited an excluded confession can be considered equivalent to the excluded confession, requiring it to also be excluded.

Court membership
- Chief Justice Harlan F. Stone Associate Justices Hugo Black · Stanley F. Reed; Felix Frankfurter · William O. Douglas; Frank Murphy · Robert H. Jackson; Wiley B. Rutledge · Harold H. Burton

Case opinions
- Majority: Black, joined by unanimous
- Concurrence: Frankfurter (in judgment)
- Jackson took no part in the consideration or decision of the case.

Ashcraft v. Tennessee, 327 U.S. 274 (1946), was a United States Supreme Court case in which the court held that admitting narrative testimony about the interrogation that elicited an excluded confession can be considered equivalent to the excluded confession, requiring it to also be excluded.

== See also ==
- Ashcraft v. Tennessee (1944)
