= Tippecanoe Place =

Historic house in Indiana, United States

- Clement Studebaker House
- U.S. National Register of Historic Places
- U.S. National Historic Landmark
- U.S. Historic district – Contributing property
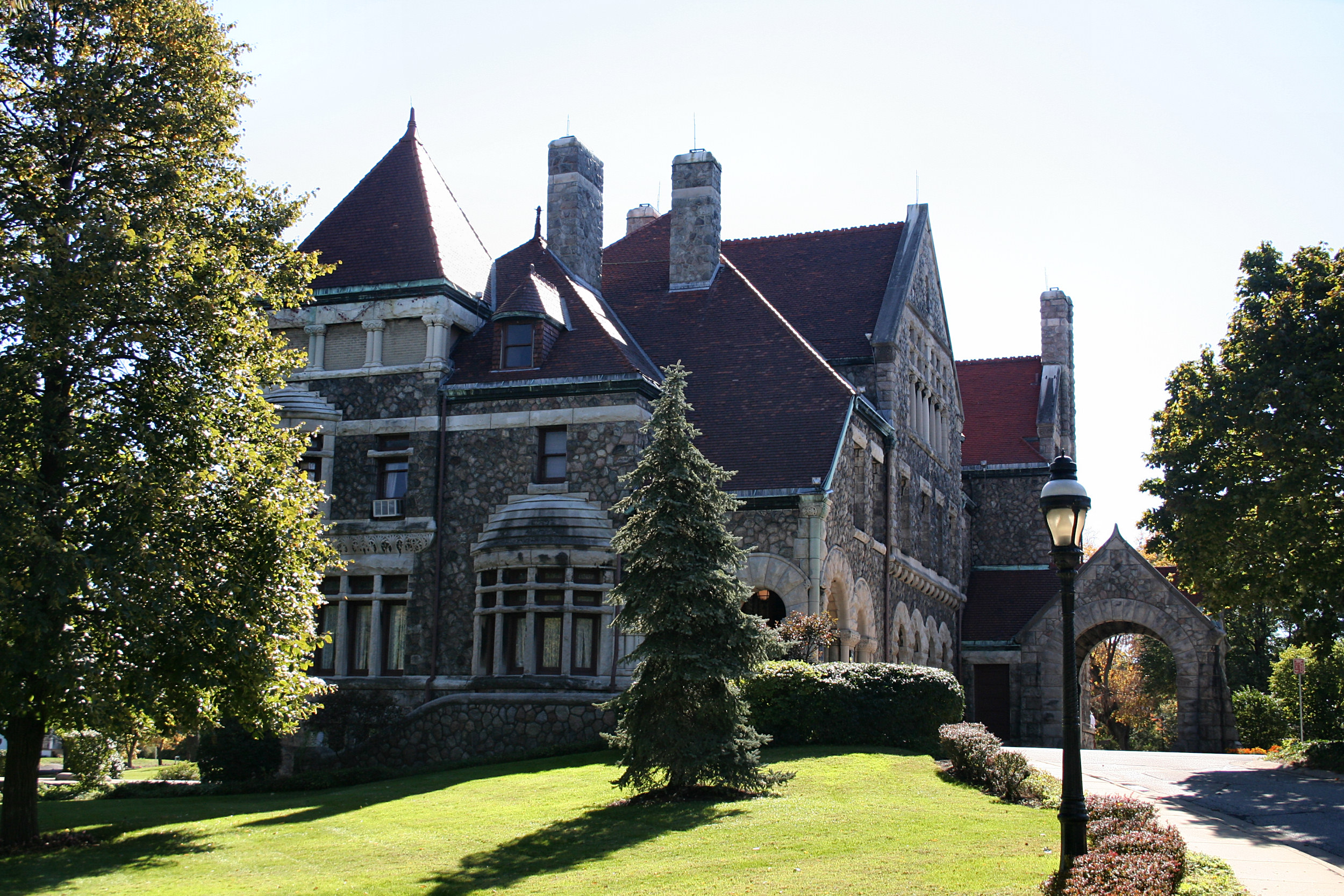
- Front of the house

- Location within Indiana Location within the United States
- Location: 620 W. Washington Ave., South Bend, Indiana
- Coordinates: 41°40′30″N 86°15′30″W
- Area: 2.6 acres (1.1 ha)
- Built: 1889
- Architect: Henry Ives Cobb; Christopher Fassnacht & Robert Braunsdorf
- Architectural style: Romanesque, Richardsonian Romanesque
- NRHP reference No.: 73000044

Significant dates
- Added to NRHP: July 2, 1973
- Designated NHL: December 22, 1977

Tippecanoe Place is a house on West Washington Street in South Bend, Indiana, United States. Built in 1889, it was the residence of Clement Studebaker, a co-founder of the Studebaker vehicle manufacturing firm. Studebaker lived in the house from 1889 until his 1901 death. The house is one of the few surviving reminders of the Studebaker automotive empire, which was the only major coach manufacturing business to successfully transition to the manufacture of automobiles. In 1973, the Richardsonian Romanesque mansion was listed on the National Register of Historic Places. It was further recognized by being designated a National Historic Landmark in 1977. It is located in South Bend's West Washington Historic District.

== History ==
The house was built in 1889 on a parcel purchased by Clement Studebaker in 1868. Studebaker lived in the previous house on the lot until 1886, when it was moved to South Scott Street to make way for construction of the present house. The house remained in his family for many years. His son George lived there until 1933 when he lost the structure due to bankruptcy. For several years, the building stood vacant but, in 1941, E. M. Morris purchased it and gave it to the city as a school for handicapped children. During World War II, however, it served as Red Cross headquarters. In 1970, possession passed to Southhold Restorations, Inc., a local historic preservation group.

The Tippecanoe Place Restaurant operated in the house from 1980 to 2026.

The house is one of the only surviving elements of the Studebaker family's manufacturing success. None of their original carriage manufacturing facilities survives in unaltered form, and none of the houses of Clement's brothers (also involved in the business) survive.

== Architecture ==
The house is a four-story masonry structure, which presents three stories to the south and west due to the sloping terrain of the lot. The foundation and walls consists of glacial boulders set in concrete, with trim of Indiana Bedford limestone. The building is a somewhat rambling irregularly massed structure, covered by tiled roofs that are either hipped or gabled, and punctuated by a number of chimneys. Prominent features include a large porte-cochere on the west side, the main entrance with its heavy double doors, and the conical tower at its northeast corner.

The house was designed by Chicago architect Henry Ives Cobb, who Studebaker selected after viewing high-style houses of the period in the Chicago area. Construction took three years.

== See also ==
- List of National Historic Landmarks in Indiana
- National Register of Historic Places listings in St. Joseph County, Indiana
