= South Bend Watch Company =

American pocket watch manufacturer (1905–1929)

The South Bend Watch Company was a US manufacturing company of pocket watches, headquartered and operated in South Bend, Indiana, during the early 20th century.

== History ==
The assets of the bankrupt Columbus Watch Company of Columbus, Ohio, were purchased by two brothers from South Bend, Indiana, in 1903. The brothers were sons of Studebaker Brothers Manufacturing Company co-founder Clement Studebaker. Following the acquisition, the operation was relocated to Indiana and reorganized as the South Bend Watch Company, with Clement Jr. serving as president. The brothers constructed a new manufacturing facility in South Bend and staffed it by hiring 145 former Columbus employees alongside master watchmaker Walter Cross Shelton Sr. from the Appleton Watch Company in Wisconsin. Outfitted with mass-production machinery, the plant initiated full-scale commercial assembly in March 1905, specializing in open-face and hunting-case pocket watches.

The company manufactured several styles of pocket watches, marketed at prices ranging from $16 to $125. While early models maintained mechanical similarities to the original Columbus designs, the company achieved commercial growth by expanding into high-grade railroad chronometers. Standard civilian production was temporarily suspended during World War I when the United States government contracted the factory to manufacture optical gun sights. By the time watch production resumed in 1918, consumer preferences had shifted significantly toward wristwatches; nevertheless, the company maintained its profitability throughout the 1920s.

The company established a dedicated mail-order subsidiary in 1923 known as the Studebaker Watch Company. Promotional materials emphasized family oversight, using the tagline "Directed by members of the Studebaker family – known for three-quarters of a century for fair dealing."

By 1929, the South Bend Watch Company had 300 employees and had produced nearly a million watches. The Studebaker line was sold on credit, requiring only one dollar down. When the stock market crashed on October 29, 1929, the company found itself with more delinquent accounts than it could handle. On November 27, 1929, the plant was closed. Employees were told it would remain closed until January 1, 1930. The plant never reopened.

Liquidation was completed in 1933. Some 35,000 watches were in production when the factory closed. Shelton, along with two other employees, completed the assembly of those watches and sold them. Shelton continued to operate the company's service department until his retirement in 1954 effectively ended the South Bend Watch Company story. The factory building, which had been used by a number of businesses over the years (including Kay Line Industries, a furniture manufacturer) was destroyed by fire in 1957.
