= Governor Hammond =

Governor Hammond may refer to:

- Abram A. Hammond (1814–1874), 13th Lieutenant Governor of Indiana
- James Henry Hammond (1807–1864), 60th Governor of South Carolina
- Jay Hammond (1922–2005), 5th Governor of Alaska
- Winfield Scott Hammond (1863–1915), 18th Governor of Minnesota
