= Bust of Ashbel Parsons Willard =

Sculpture by Henry Dexter

Ashbel Parsons Willard
- Artist: Henry Dexter
- Year: 1860
- Type: plaster bust
- Dimensions: 60 cm × 23 cm × 29 cm (23.5 in × 9 in × 11.5 in)
- Location: Indianapolis, IN; 39°46′6.95″N 86°9′45.08″W

Ashbel Parsons Willard is a piece of public art by American sculptor Henry Dexter, located on the second floor or third level (including the basement) of the Indiana Statehouse, located between Washington Street and Ohio Street in Indianapolis, the capital of Indiana, a U.S. state. The bust is located in a niche outside the central rotunda. It faces north and is on the eastern side of the rotunda.

The sculpture is a plaster cast, which has been painted with many layers of white paint. A maker's mark embossed on the front side of the base states it was made in Boston, Massachusetts. This formerly unknown bust is actually a part of a series of thirty one portrait busts created by the artist Henry Dexter in an 18-month period between 1859 and 1860. The bust is actually a copy of the original which is part of the Smithsonian's collection. The maker's mark is difficult to read due to the many coats of paint, which may be the reason the bust has been unidentified up to this point. The layers of paint have been added over the years, and largely obscure the mark, but it seems to identify 1860 as the date of its manufacture. This date is historically concurrent with the year of Governor Ashbel Parsons Willard's death.

== Description ==
The sculpture is 23.5 inches (60 cm) from crown to base. The base is 9 inches (23 cm) by 11.5 inches (29 cm) and the circumference of the head is 24.5 inches (62 cm). It has an oval makers mark embossed on the bottom of the front side. The makers mark reads: HENRY DEXTER FECIT, BOSTON 1860, COPY RIGHT SECURED.

The proper right and proper left sides of the bust show signs of wear with the plaster visible along front-facing edges all the way down the base. The bust was likely cast as one whole piece and then painted white to give a uniform and finished look to the work. The rear-facing side has an inscription written in cursive script which reads: Gov. Willard, Ind.. The bust has a hollow cavity and the plaster is approximately 1–2 in. thick throughout the sculpture. The plaster appears to be of highly quality, possibly stucco which is a mixture of lime, marble dust and other organic materials. The bust has a rather stoic facial expression similar to the painting of Governor Willard done by portrait painter George W. Morrison. However, Dexter's portrait gives Willard a fuller mouth and a more narrow nose than the Morrison painting. His hair style is similar in both works, it is parted on the proper left hand side and combed over the crown of the head. His hair has long curling locks that add volume to the sides and back of the head and hang just below his earlobes. This style is in keeping with men's hairstyles in the late 1850s early 1860s.

== Historical information ==
The bust of Ashbel Parsons Willard was executed by Henry Dexter sometime after the letter of introduction from Governor Moses Wisner of Michigan was drafted. The letter is dated April 25, 1860. Dexter traveled by rails to move his supplies so it is safe to assume he arrived in Indianapolis, in late April or early May depending on when he left Michigan. There is no record of his time there, but that time in Governor Willard's life was tumultuous. He was under investigation for defrauding the state and misappropriating funds in the construction of the Northern Indiana State Prison. He was also ailing and his increasingly poor health, due to his lifelong battle with tuberculosis, lead to his early death. He died October 4, 1860, the first Indiana governor to die in office. Willard was also the youngest governor ever elected to the position.

Dexter had hoped to inspire the state to purchase a copy of his portrait bust, but Willard was unpopular at the time when Dexter modeled him, so it is unknown how the state came to acquire the plaster bust that now sits in the statehouse. The original bust, which has a larger base, 15.5 inches (39 cm) by 10.5 inches (27 cm), is currently in the collection of Smithsonian Institution National Museum of American History. It is part of the catalog listing for the National Portrait Gallery.

Henry Dexter's creation of thirty one portrait busts of governors in the year period between June 1859 and June 24, 1860, recorded some of the most remarkable men in power on the cusp of the American Civil War. Several of the men who modeled for Dexter's busts later went on to be primary council to President Abraham Lincoln and held various military positions in the great conflict between the North and South.

== Artist ==
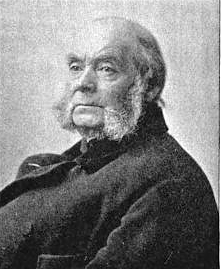
Portrait of Artist Henry Dexter, Boston. Published posthumously, 1891.

Henry Dexter (1806–1876) was a prominent American sculptor in the 19th century. Born in Nelson, New York he was apprenticed to a blacksmith shortly after his father's death when his family moved to Connecticut. Dexter taught himself to paint, but was aided in the process by artist Francis Alexander who was his wife's uncle. He moved to Boston in 1836 and opened his own portrait studio. 2 years later he began to sculpt famous people, starting with the Reverend Dr. Anderson. Dexter was completely self-taught and did not seek to study the European or classical Greek styles of his compatriots, for this reason he is considered among the first true American sculptors.

Henry Dexter sculpted over 200 busts in plaster and marble between the years of 1838 and 1875. Some of his most famous sculptures are his portraits of Charles Dickens and President James Buchanan. His depiction of President Buchanan was later used to model his U.S. postage stamp which was part of a series depicting the presidents of the United States.

Henry Dexter was a patriot who hoped to create a gallery of sculptural works depicting the president of the United States and the governors of every US state in the late 1850s on the cusp of the Civil War. He hoped to achieve a unifying official portrait of this period in America's history. This initiative was self-funded at its conception, utilizing his own moneys Dexter traveled some 20,000 miles with all of his tools for modeling and casting. His initial plan was to model each governor in clay and later plaster and with the hope that individual states would then purchase marble renderings post facto for the sum of $500, thus helping him recuperate his costs. This gigantic undertaking began in 1859 as Dexter first traveled to every state in New England having governors of each state sit for him and sending the modeled clay busts back to his workshop in Boston. He then began to work his way along the Mason–Dixon line and finally across the South. He returned to the North to model the recently deceased Governor William Henry Bissell of Illinois before heading to Wisconsin and presumably Minnesota, Michigan and Indiana between the months of April – June 1860. It is likely that Dexter was in Indiana in late April or early May given a letter of introductory correspondence between Michigan Governor Moses Wisner to Governor Willard dated April 25, 1860. (Governor Willard died in October 1860).

This expedition resulted in thirty one finished busts which were intended to be displayed in the Capitol building in Washington, D.C. However, due to the volatility bred by the recent secession of the Southern states, the totality of the collection was not able to be displayed. By his own admission this endeavor was a failure financially, it left him impoverished for years after his eighteen months of travel across the country. However, historically Dexter's renderings of some of the prominent gubernatorial figures of the United States became a study of many of the most powerful men who were key players in the Civil War. Far from being aware of the long term historical significance of his work Dexter hoped only to accomplish a unifying collection of the nation's administrators.

After his death June 23, 1876, the bulk of his collection of governors was donated to the Smithsonian Institution in 1889. Some of the busts remain with private owners or in the collections of some of the states who purchased copies for their own collections.

== See also ==
- William H. English (Indianapolis)
