= George Brewster (sculptor) =

American sculptor (1862–1943)

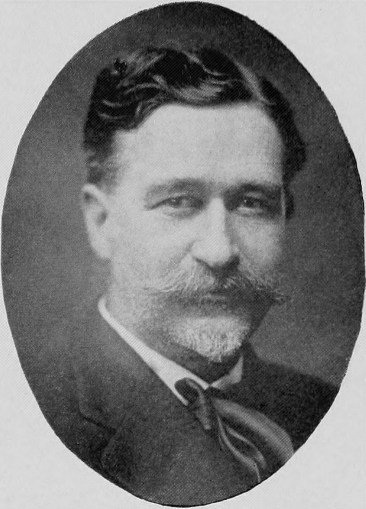
George Thomas Brewster

George Thomas Brewster (1862–1943) was an American sculptor and architectural sculptor, known for his portraits and war memorials. Brewster taught modeling at Cooper Union, beginning in 1900; at the Art Students League of New York, beginning in 1886; and at the Rhode Island School of Design, in 1893 and 1894.

== Life and education ==
Brewster was born on February 24, 1862, in Kingston, Massachusetts. He studied first at the Massachusetts State Normal Art School in Boston, and then for three years at the Ecole des Beaux Arts in Paris, France. His teachers there included Augustin Dumont and Antonin Mercie.

== Selected works ==
Selected Works

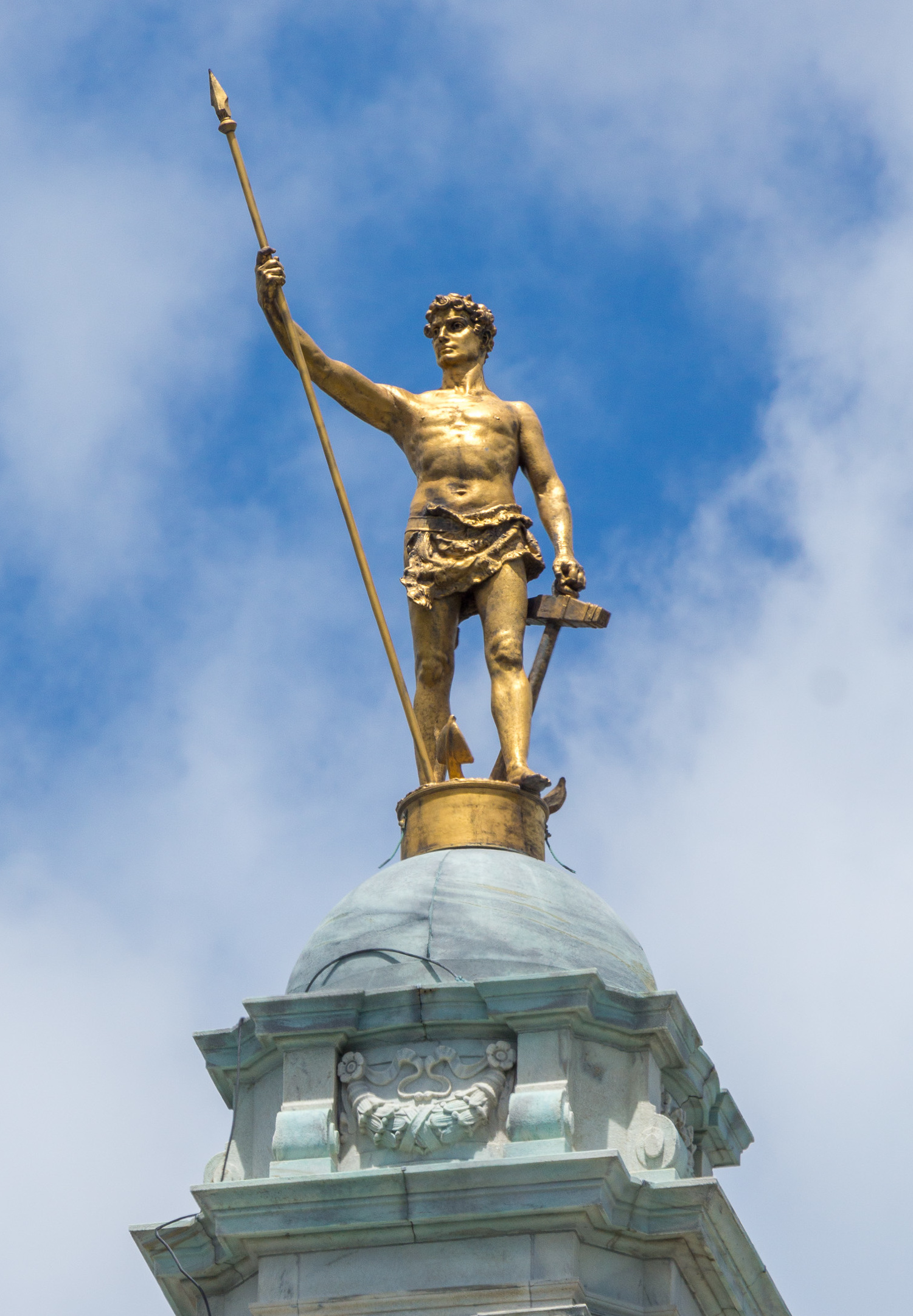
Independent Man (1899-1900), atop the Rhode Island State House

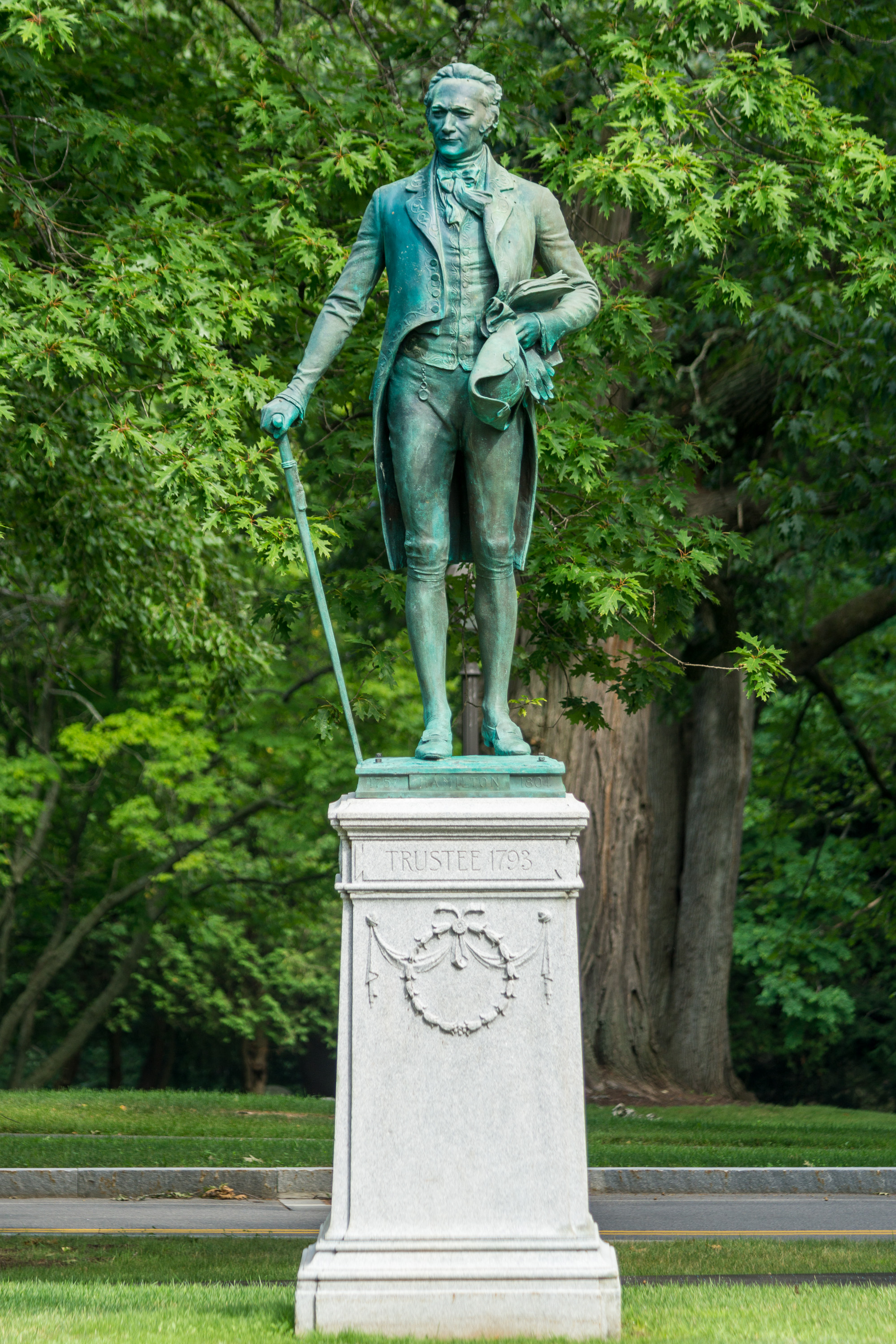
Alexander Hamilton, 1793 at Hamilton College, 1918

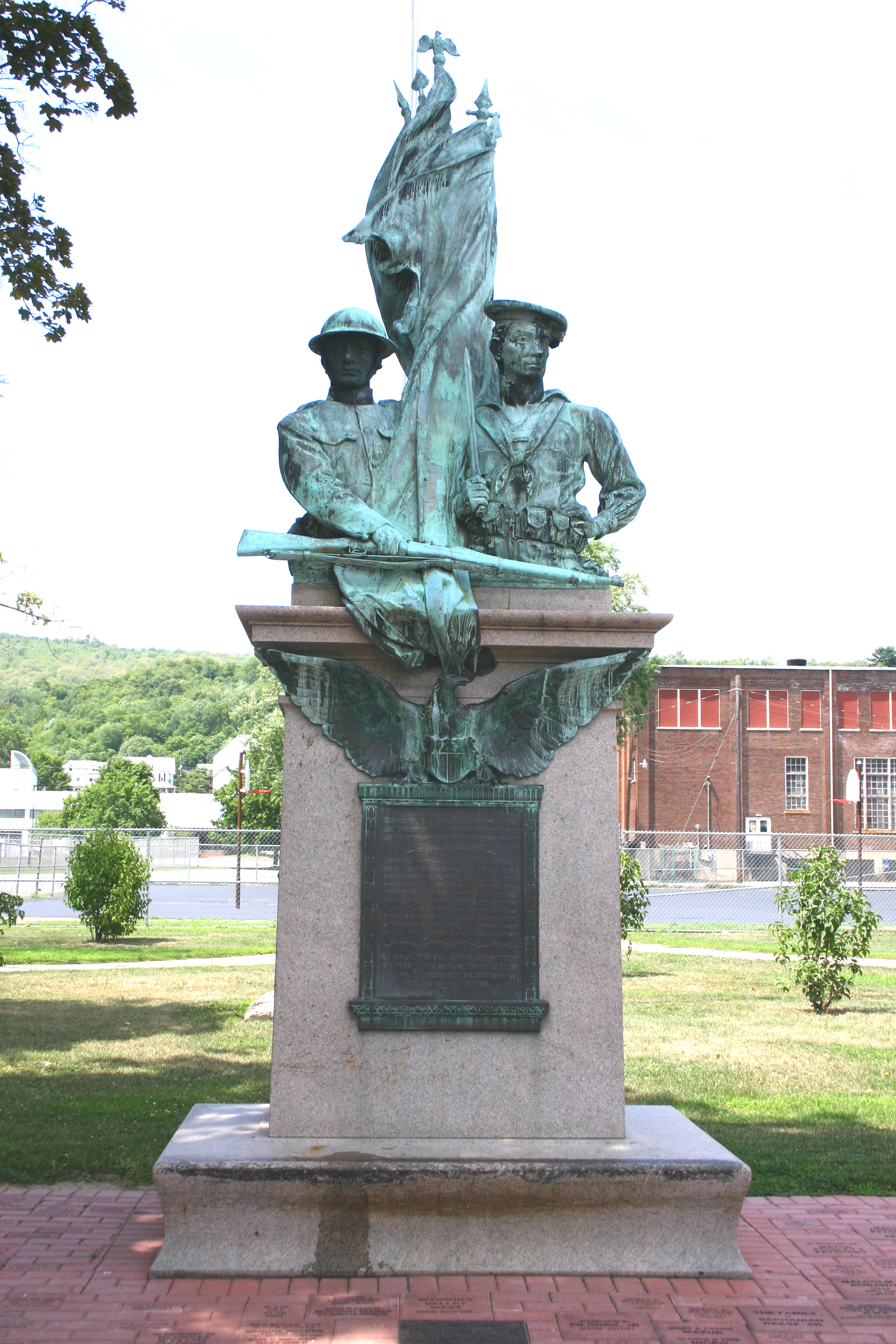
Soldiers and Sailors Monument, Plymouth, Pennsylvania, 1920

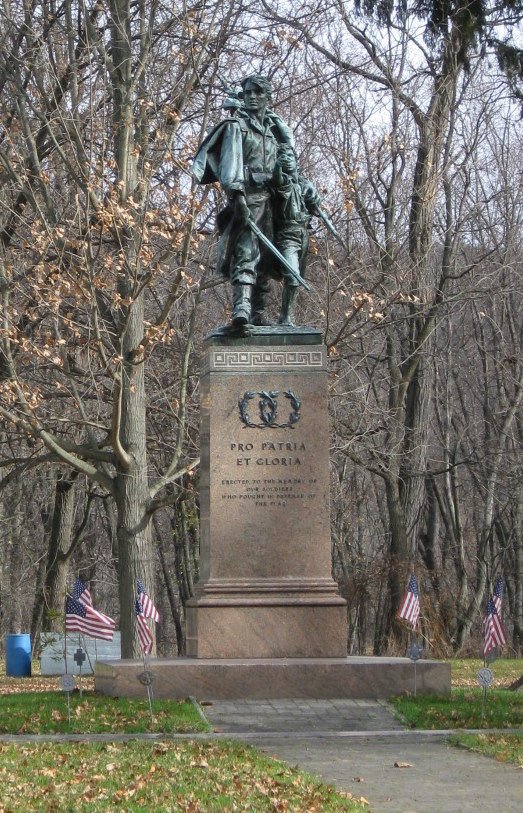
Protection of the Flag, Athens, Pennsylvania, 1902

- Victory (finial figure), architectural sculpture, Indiana Soldiers' and Sailors' Monument, Indianapolis, Indiana, 1897-1902.
- Stephen Decatur, Dewey Triumphal Arch, New York City, 1899 (destroyed).
- Independent Man (finial figure), atop Rhode Island State House, Providence, Rhode Island, 1899-1900.
- Protection of the Flag, Village Green, Athens, Pennsylvania, 1902.
- Portrait medallions on exterior of Saint Louis Art Museum, Saint Louis, Missouri, 1904.
- Bas-relief portrait of Augustus Saint-Gaudens, National Portrait Gallery, Washington, D.C., 1904.
- Greek Drama and Greek State, statues on exterior of Brooklyn Museum, Brooklyn, New York City, 1907-09.
- Equestrian statue of William Penn Hussey, New England Home for the Deaf, Danvers, Massachusetts, 1913.
- Patrick Walsh, Barrett Plaza, Augusta, Georgia, 1913.
- Alexander Hamilton - 1793, Hamilton College, Clinton, New York, 1918.
- Soldiers and Sailors Monument, Plymouth, Pennsylvania, dedicated in 1920.
- Thomas Redfield Proctor Monument, Roscoe Conkling Park, Utica, New York, 1921.
- Portrait bust of Robert E. Lee, Hall of Fame for Great Americans, Bronx Community College, Bronx, New York City, 1923.

== Works in the Vicksburg National Military Park ==
- Lieut. Col. Sidney H. Griffin (1919)
- Brig. Gen. John W. Whitfield (1913)
- Brig. Gen. Elias S. Dennis (1915)
- Brig. Gen. States Rights Gist (1915)
- Brig. Gen. Alvin P. Hovey (1915)
- Brig. Gen. Nathan Kimball (1915)
- Maj. Gen. Dabney H. Maury (1915) one of the monuments vandalized in 2003
- Brig. Gen. William Vandever (1915)
- Col. Eugene Erwin (1916)
- Brig. Gen. Thomas E. G. Ransom (1916)
- Lt. Col. Melancthon Smith (1916)
- Capt. Patrick H. White (1917)
- Maj. Alexander Yates (1917)
- Maj. Joseph W. Anderson (1919)
- Col. Skidmore Harris (1919)
- Col. Randal MacGavock (1919)
- Lieut. Col. Madison Rogers (1919)
- Maj. Gen. Cadwallader Washburn (1919)
- Maj. Robert B. Campbell (1920)
- Capt. Toby Hart (1921), one of the monuments vandalized in 2003
- Lieut. Col. L. L. McLaurin (1921)
- Maj. Frederick N. Ogden (1921)
- Gov. Oliver P. Morton (1926)

== Gallery ==
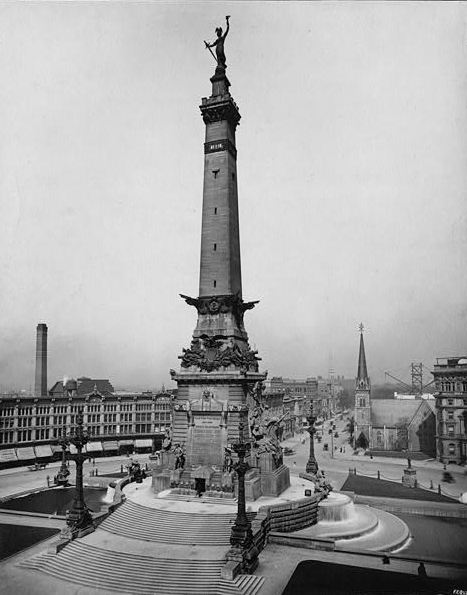
Indiana Soldiers' and Sailors' Monument, Indianapolis, Indiana, in 1898.

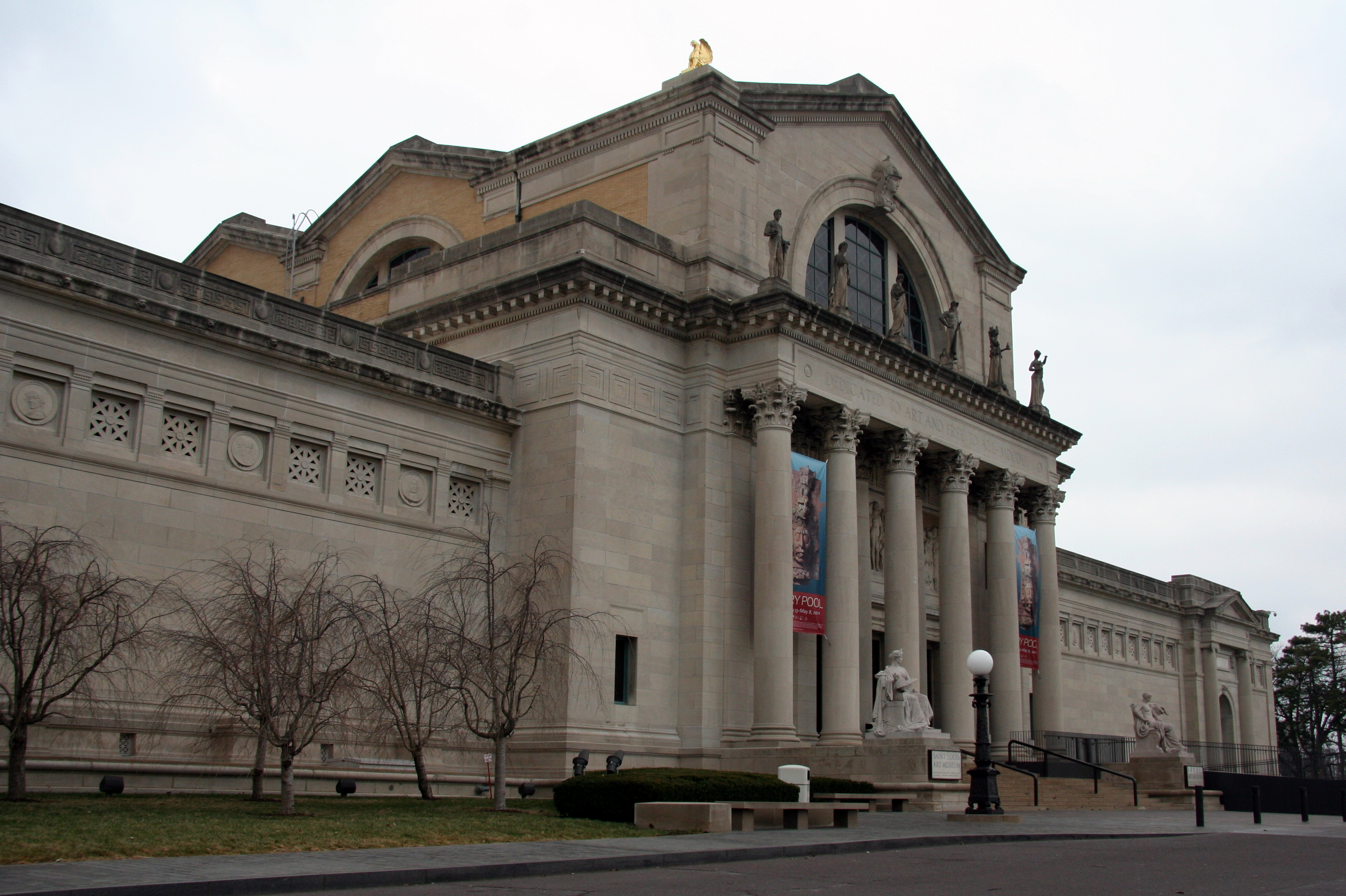
Saint Louis Art Museum (1904), Saint Louis, Missouri.

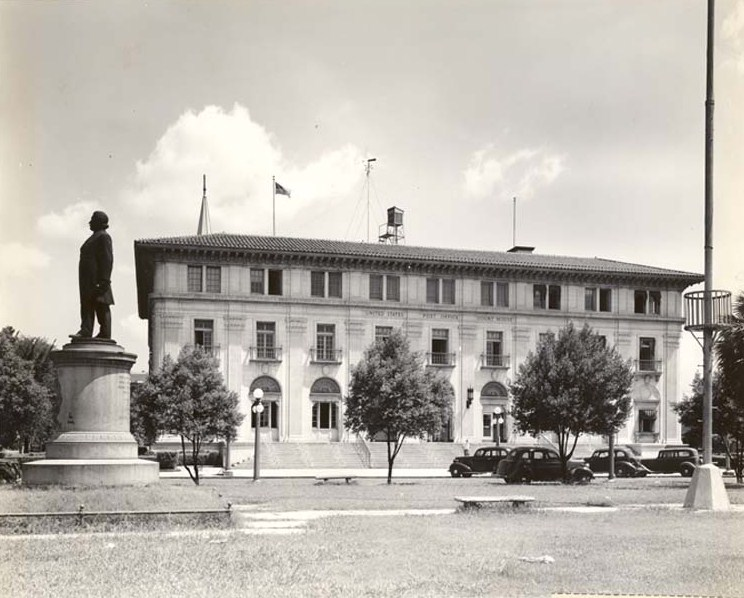
Patrick Walsh (1913), Barrett Plaza, Augusta, Georgia.

=== Relief portraits at Vicksburg National Military Park ===
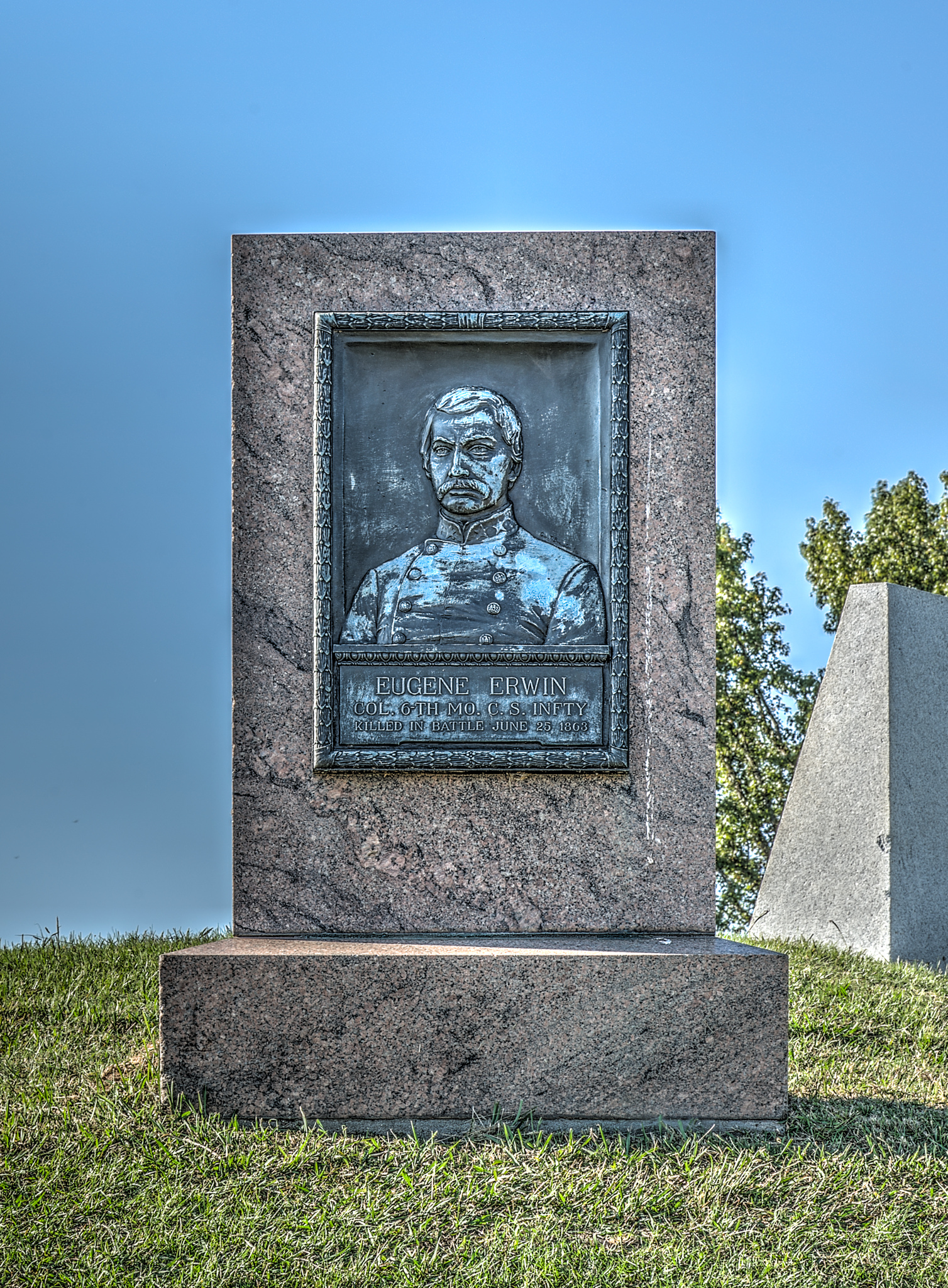
Col. Eugene Erwin (1916)

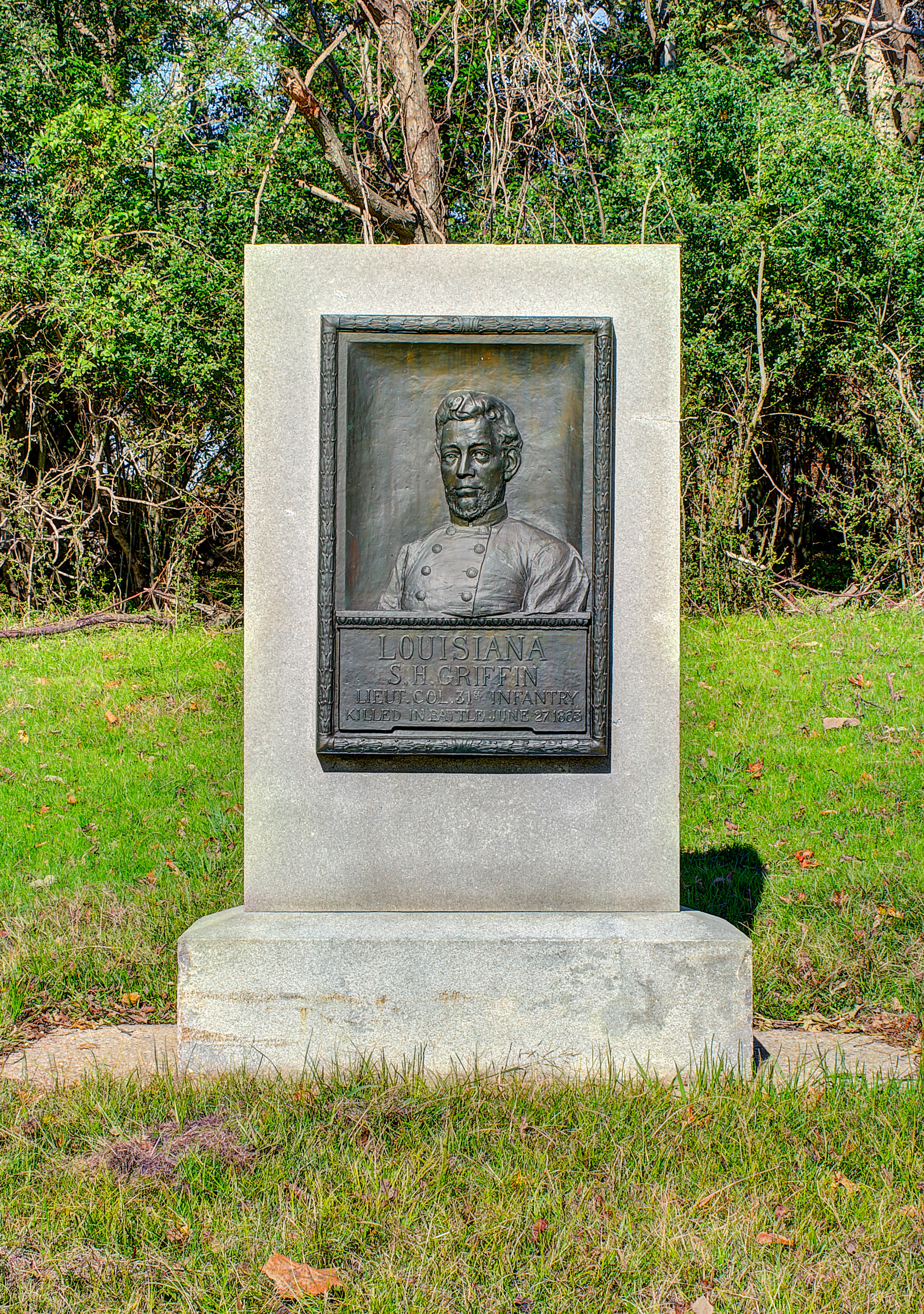
Lt. Col. Sidney H. Griffin (1919)

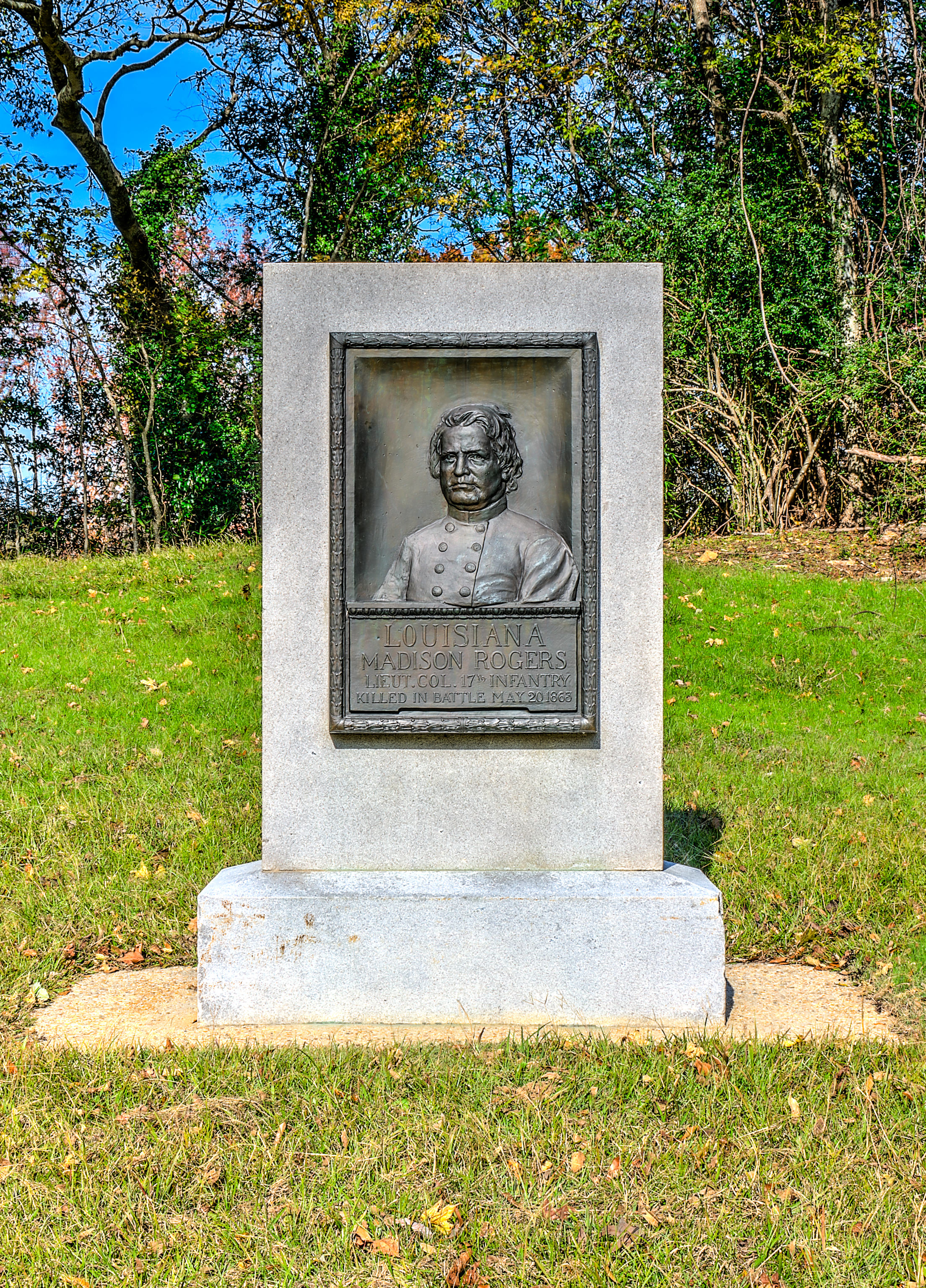
Lt. Col. Madison Rogers (1919)

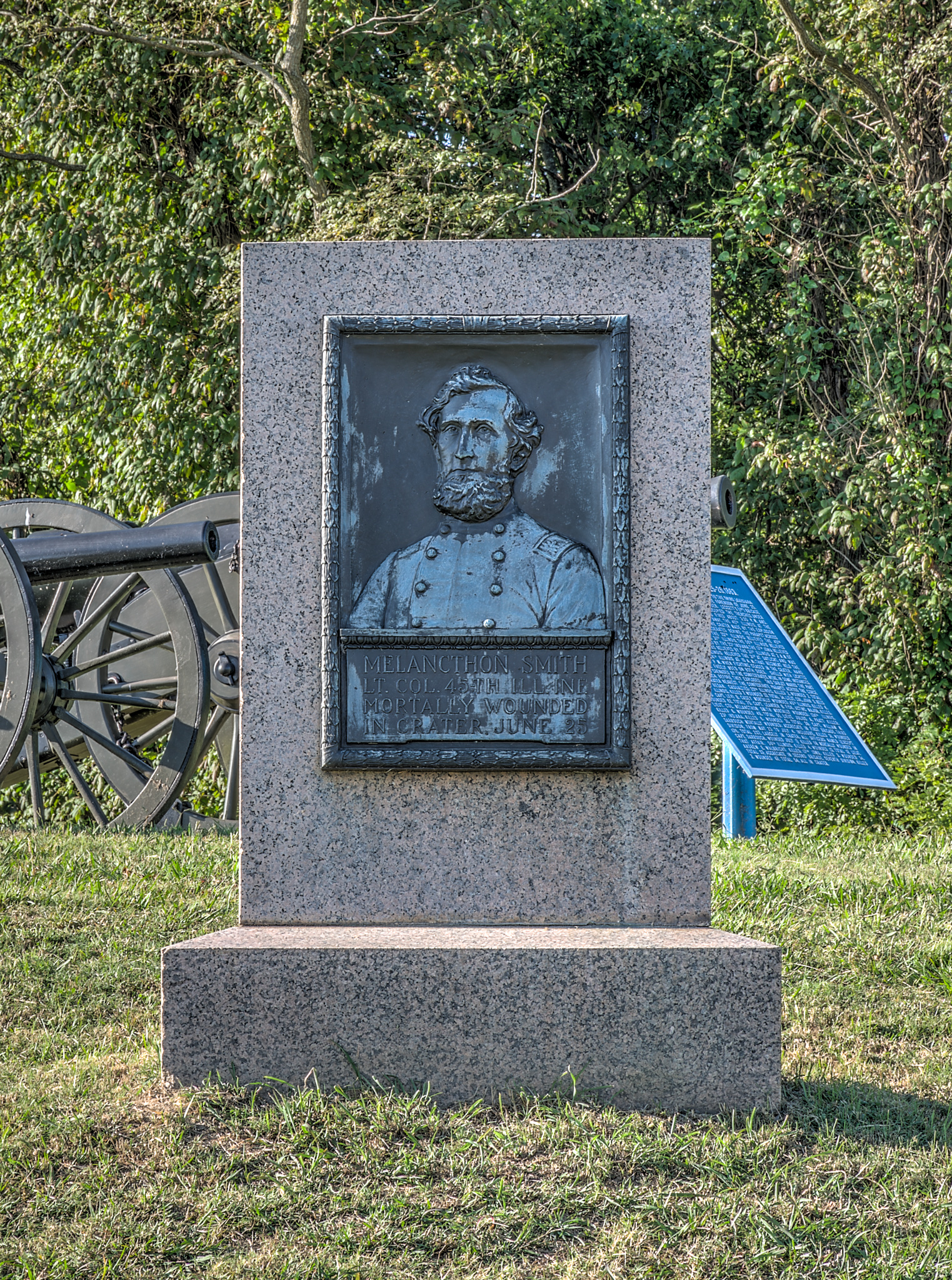
Lt. Col. Melancthon Smith (1916)
