= People's Party (Indiana) =

- Leader: Henry S. Lane; Oliver P. Morton
- Founded: 1854; 172 years ago
- Dissolved: 1860; 166 years ago
- Preceded by: Whig Party; Democratic Party (anti-extension faction); Know Nothing-influenced elements
- Merged into: Republican Party
- Headquarters: Indianapolis, Indiana
- Ideology: Anti-Kansas-Nebraska Act; Populism; Conservatism
- House of Representatives (1855): 9 / 234 (peak)

The Indiana People's Party was a short-lived American political party in the state of Indiana. It participated in the United States House of Representatives election of 1854, and continued to function until 1860, when it merged into the Republican Party. The party attracted former Democrats and Whigs who were opposed to the Kansas-Nebraska Act, which extended slavery in the United States.

== Foundation ==
Henry S. Lane was essential in organizing the People's Party in Indiana. Lane's influence over the older Whigs brought most into the People's Party, while abolitionists joined because of the anti-Kansas-Nebraska Act platform. Lane also helped to convince many Democrats and Know-Nothings who opposed the extension of slavery to join the People's Party. In 1854, the young Indiana party was more conservative than the national Republican Party. The People's Party resisted adopting the name "Republican" because of its association with the eastern abolition movement, which many Hoosiers saw as too radical. In 1856, Lane chaired the People's Party Convention in Indianapolis and the Republican National Convention in Philadelphia.

=== Merging into the Republican Party ===
Between 1856 and 1860, the Indiana People's Party platform conformed to the national Republican platform and also became known as the Republican Party.

== Members of Congress ==
=== U.S. senators ===
None

=== U.S. representatives ===
- Indiana's 3rd congressional district- George G. Dunn (1855–1857)
- Indiana's 4th congressional district- William Cumback (1855–1857)
- Indiana's 5th congressional district- David P. Holloway (1855–1857)
- Indiana's 6th congressional district- Lucien Barbour (1855–1857)
- Indiana's 7th congressional district- Harvey D. Scott (1855–1857)
- Indiana's 8th congressional district- Daniel Mace (1855–1857)
- Indiana's 9th congressional district- Schuyler Colfax (1855–1869)
- Indiana's 10th congressional district- Samuel Brenton (1855–1857)
- Indiana's 11th congressional district- John U. Pettit (1855–1861)

== Electoral history ==
=== Federal elections ===
| Congress | House of Representatives | | | |
| Congress | Election | Seats | Change | Percent |
|---|---|---|---|---|
| 34th | 1854–55 | 9 / 234 | ▲9 | 3.17 |

=== State elections ===
| Year | Governor of Indiana | | | | |
| Year | Candidate | Votes | Vote percent | Outcome | |
|---|---|---|---|---|---|
| Year | 1856 | Oliver P. Morton | 112,039 | 48.71 | Lost |

== See also ==
- Political party strength in U.S. states
- United States House of Representatives elections, 1854
