= Oliver P. Morton =

American politician (1823–1877)

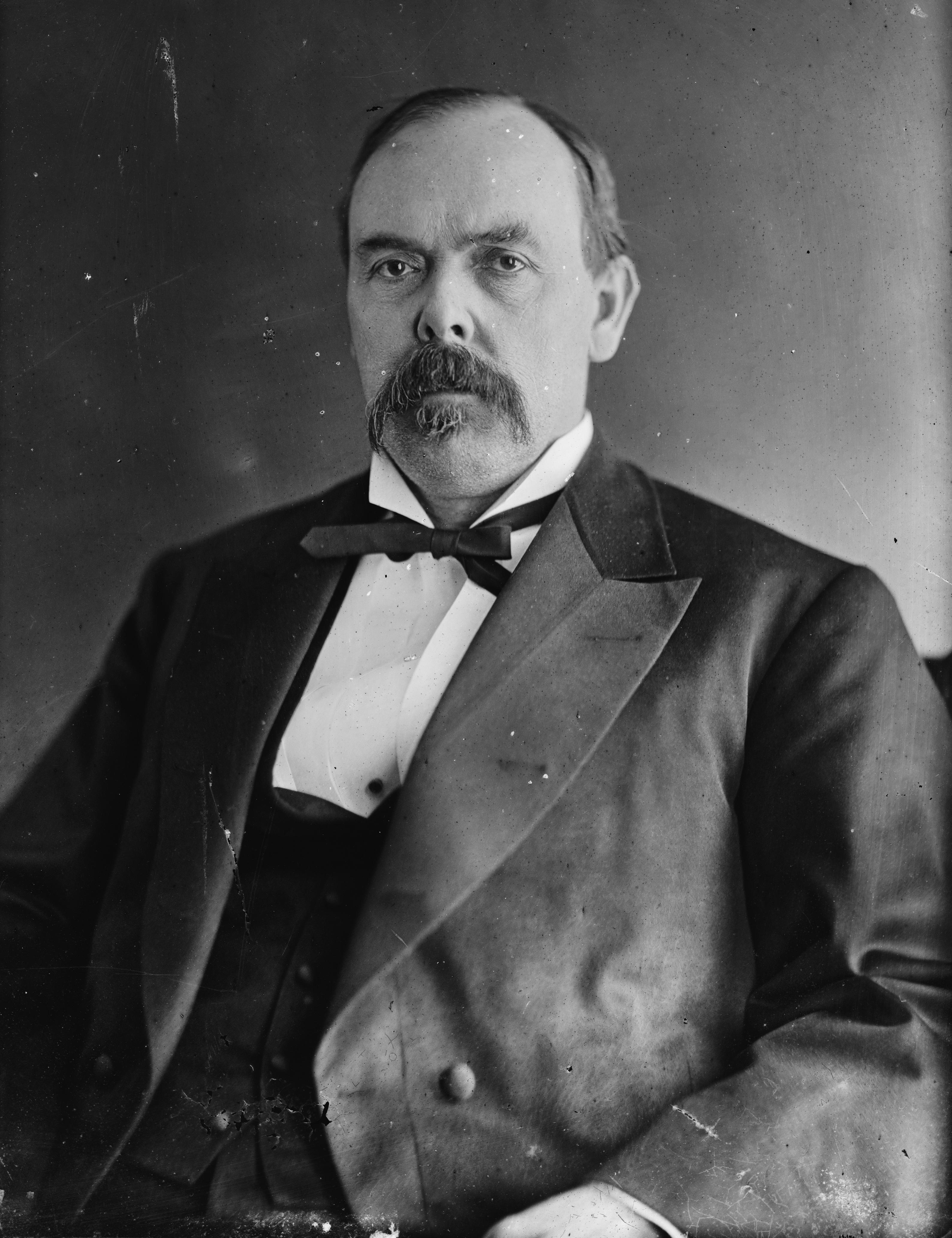
- Morton, c. 1870–1880

United States Senator from Indiana
- In office March 4, 1867 – November 1, 1877
- Preceded by: Henry S. Lane
- Succeeded by: Daniel W. Voorhees

14th Governor of Indiana
- In office January 16, 1861 – January 24, 1867
- Lieutenant: John R. Cravens (acting); Conrad Baker
- Preceded by: Henry S. Lane
- Succeeded by: Conrad Baker

14th Lieutenant Governor of Indiana
- In office January 14, 1861 – January 16, 1861
- Governor: Henry S. Lane
- Preceded by: Abram A. Hammond
- Succeeded by: John R. Cravens (acting)

Personal details
- Born: Oliver Hazard Perry Throck Morton; August 4, 1823 Wayne County, Indiana, U.S.
- Died: November 1, 1877 (aged 54) Indianapolis, Indiana, U.S.
- Resting place: Crown Hill Cemetery and Arboretum, Section 9, Lot 37, Indianapolis, Indiana; 39.816922°N 86.172252°W
- Party: Republican (from 1856)
- Other political affiliations: Democratic (before 1854); Indiana People's Party (1854–1860)
- Spouse: Lucinda Burbank Morton
- Education: Miami University; Cincinnati College

Oliver Hazard Perry Throck Morton (August 4, 1823 – November 1, 1877), commonly known as Oliver P. Morton, was a U.S. Republican Party politician from Indiana. He served as the 14th governor of Indiana during the American Civil War, and was a stalwart ally of President Abraham Lincoln.

Morton fought for equality and nationalism through the use of governmental power. His forceful pursuit of civil rights and prosecution of Copperheads and white supremacists gained him lasting enemies among the antiwar elements. Morton thwarted and neutralized the Democratic-controlled Indiana General Assembly. He exceeded his constitutional authority by calling out the militia without approval, and during the period of legislative suppression he privately financed the state government through unapproved federal and private loans. He was criticized for arresting and detaining political enemies and suspected southern sympathizers. As one of President Lincoln's "war governors", Morton made significant contributions to the war effort.

During his second term as governor, and after being partially paralyzed by a stroke, he was elected to serve in the U.S. Senate. He was a leader among the Radical Republicans of the Reconstruction era, and supported numerous bills designed to reform the former Southern Confederacy. In 1877, during his second term in the Senate, Morton suffered a second debilitating stroke that caused a rapid deterioration in his health; he died later that year. Morton was mourned nationally and his funeral procession was witnessed by thousands. He is buried in Indianapolis's Crown Hill Cemetery.

== Early life ==
=== Family and background ===
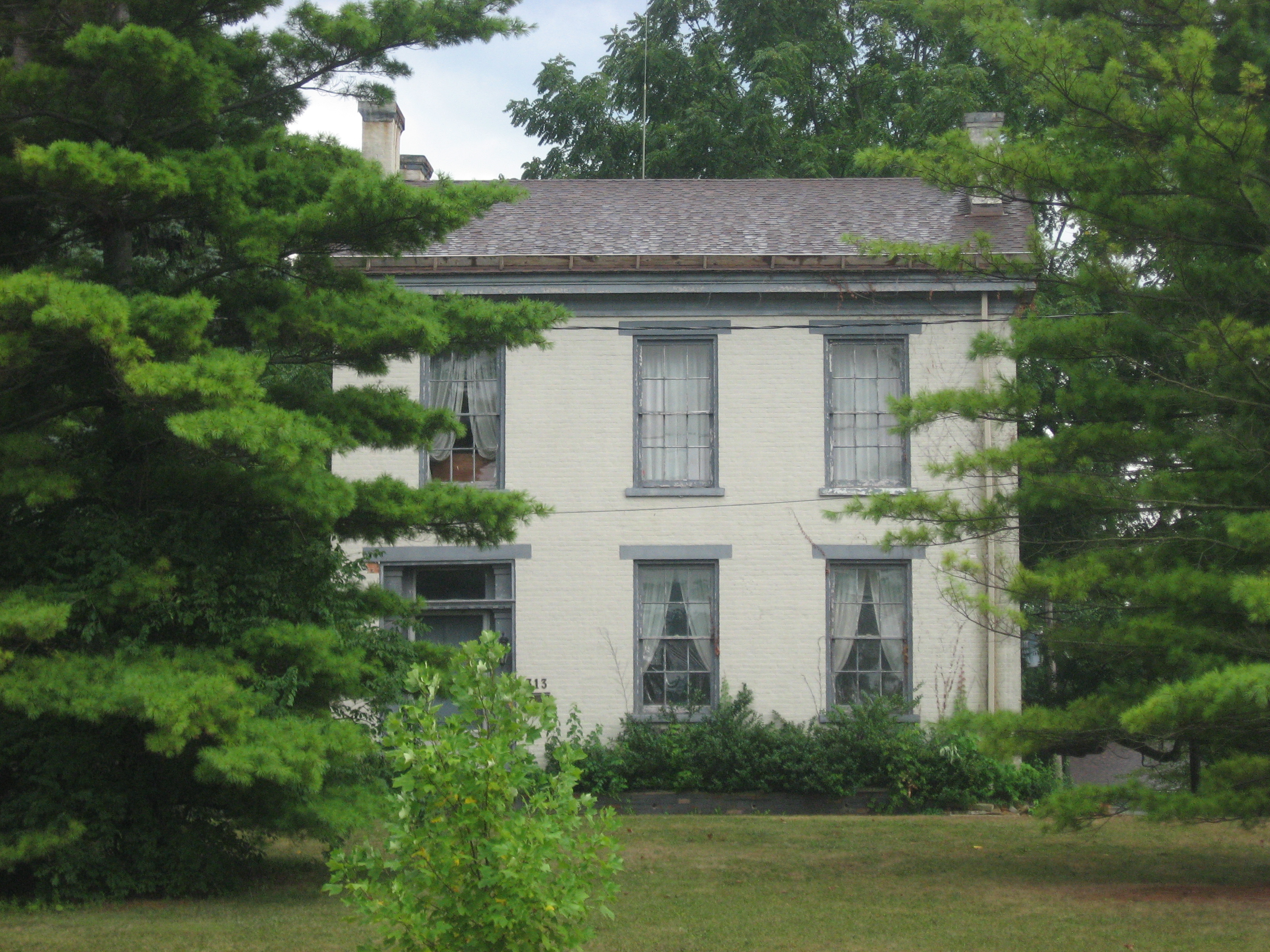
Morton's house in Centerville

Morton was an Indiana native born in Wayne County near the small settlement of Salisbury on August 4, 1823, to James Throck and Sarah Miller Morton. His grandfather had shortened the family's surname, Throckmorton, to Morton, but the males in the family carried Throck as a middle name. He was named for Oliver Hazard Perry, the victorious Commodore in the Battle of Lake Erie. Morton disliked his name from an early age, and before beginning his political career he shortened it to Oliver Perry Morton, dropping the middle names of Hazard and Throck. His mother died when he was three, and he was raised by his maternal grandparents. He spent most of his young life living with them in Ohio.

Morton returned to eastern Indiana as a young man, and joined his family at Centerville. Leaving school at the age of fifteen, Morton briefly worked as an apothecary's clerk, but left after a dispute with the proprietor and apprenticed as a hat maker. After four years in the hat-making business he became dissatisfied and quit to enroll at Miami University in Oxford, Ohio, where he studied for two years and was initiated into Beta Theta Pi fraternity. He then briefly attended Cincinnati College to continue his law studies. In 1845 he returned to Centerville and was admitted to the Indiana bar in 1846. Morton formed a law practice with Judge Newman and became a successful and moderately wealthy attorney. John F. Kibbey, the man who Morton would later appoint as Indiana Attorney General, began studying law under Morton in Richmond in 1849. After Kibbey was admitted to the bar in 1852, he and Morton began to practice law together until 1860. Morton married Lucinda Burbank in 1845. The couple had five children, but only two survived infancy.

=== Early political career ===
In 1852 Morton campaigned and was elected to serve as a circuit court judge, but resigned after only a year; he found that he preferred to practice law. By 1854 he was active in Indiana politics. Initially, Morton was an anti-slavery Democrat, but living in a region dominated by the Whig Party he had little hope of furthering a political career without changing his party affiliation. Passage of the Kansas-Nebraska Act (1854), which repealed the Missouri Compromise's ban on slavery in the western territories, beyond Missouri, had a divisive effect on both parties. As the Democrats divided over the issue, Morton took a stand with the Free Soil supporters and opposed the Act. Under the influence of U.S. Senator Jesse D. Bright, the state's Democrats expelled their anti-slavery members, including Morton, from the Indiana state convention in 1854. That same year Morton joined with other political factions to form the People's Party, the forerunner to the state's Republican Party.

By February 1856 Morton had made his way to the newly formed Republican party at the national level as a member of the resolutions committee to the preliminary national convention that met in Pittsburgh. He also served as a delegate to the 1856 Republican National Convention in Philadelphia. Thirty-two-year-old Morton became the People's/Republican candidate for governor of Indiana in 1856. His Democratic opponent was Ashbel P. Willard, a popular state senator. Despite a hard-fought campaign that for the first time brought Morton to the attention of voters around the state, Willard defeated him in the general election by fewer than 6,000 votes, amid charges on both sides of fraudulent voting. Radical Republican George W. Julian, who detested Morton, contended that Morton did not take a strong enough position against slavery, and, as conservative former Whigs claimed, he had been too lenient on the issue in a state where southern-born residents wanted nothing to do with blacks or abolitionism. Despite these criticisms, Morton's anti-slavery speeches made him popular among the Republicans in Indiana. Noted for his "plain and convincing" manner of speaking, Morton's contemporaries said he was not "eloquent or witty", but rather "logical and reasonable".

By 1858, the People's party had officially adopted the name of Republican, and in 1860 the Republicans nominated Morton for lieutenant governor of Indiana on a ticket with the more conservative former Whig, Henry S. Lane, as its gubernatorial candidate. Savvy Republican politicians thought that Morton would be seen as too radical and could not carry the former Know-Nothing vote in the southern half of the state, while a man of Whig antecedents like Lane would. Because both men had strong support within the party, and neither had much desire to make open war on one another, a compromise was arranged, giving Lane the gubernatorial nomination and Morton the nomination for lieutenant governor. Both nominees understood that if they carried the state and a Republican majority was elected to the state legislature in the fall, the Indiana General Assembly would choose Lane for a seat in the U.S. Senate and Morton would become the successor to the Indiana governorship. The campaign focused primarily on the prevailing issues of the nation, including homesteading legislation, tariffs, and the looming possibility of civil war. Lane and Morton won in the state's general election and the Republicans gained control of the state legislature. As it had been pre-arranged with the candidates, on the day after Lane's inauguration as governor, the General Assembly chose him to fill a U.S. Senate seat. Lane resigned immediately and Morton succeeded him to become the fourteenth governor of Indiana on January 18, 1861, and its first governor to be born in the state.

== Governor ==
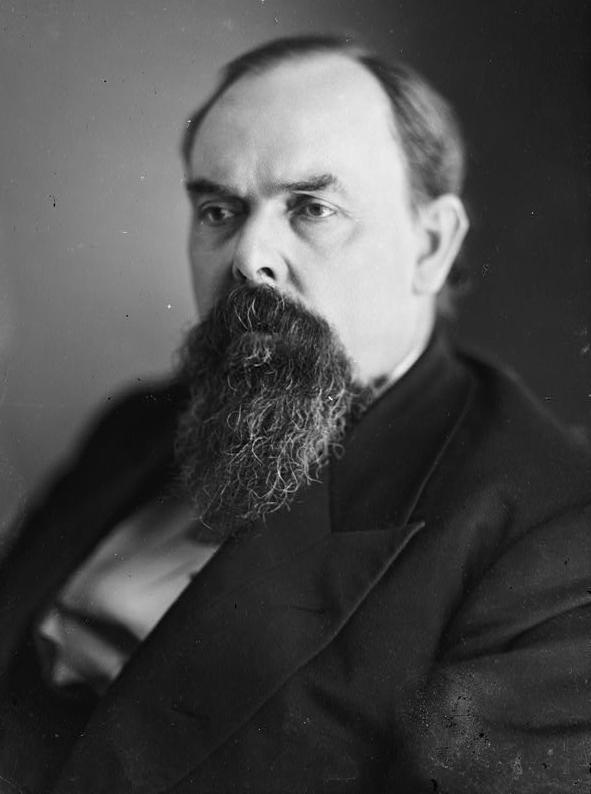
Oliver P. Morton after his first stroke

=== War effort ===
Morton served as governor of Indiana for six years (1861–1867) and strongly supported the Union during the Civil War. While others urged compromise and conciliation, Morton demanded an end to concession discussions, with no further compromise, and, if necessary, the use of force to preserve the Union. In a speech he delivered on November 22, 1860, Morton declared: "If it is worth a bloody struggle to establish this nation, it is worth one to preserve it." He was also a staunch supporter of President Abraham Lincoln's conduct of the war. Morton, who was not in favor of conciliation, believed his role as Indiana's governor was "to denounce treason and uphold the cause of the Union."

Morton also believed that war was inevitable and began to prepare the state for its outbreak during his early tenure as governor. Morton appointed men to positions in state government who opposed any compromise with the southern states. He also established without legislative permission a state arsenal, where up to 700 men produced ammunition, and made many other preparations for the impending war.

Three days after the war began on April 12, 1861, at the Battle of Fort Sumter in South Carolina, Governor Morton telegraphed President Lincoln offering 10,000 volunteers from Indiana under arms to help suppress the rebellion. By the end of April, about 12,000 Hoosier volunteers had signed up to fight for the Union, exceeding the state's initial quota of six regiments (4,683 men). In a special session of the Indiana General Assembly held on April 24, 1861, Morton called for Indiana's politicians to set aside party considerations and unite in defense of the Union. He also received the state legislature's authority to borrow and spend funds to purchase arms and supplies for Indiana's troops.

Among Lincoln's "war governors", who were critically important in the early prosecution of the war, "no governor played his role more valiantly or effectively than did Morton." Although Morton's efforts were not without controversy and garnered significant opposition from his political adversaries, his greatest strength during the war was his ability to raise volunteers and money for the Union army and to equip them for battle. Morton also successfully suppressed Indiana's Confederate sympathizers. As the leader of the Republicans in the state, he confronted the Peace Democrats, especially the "Copperheads".

Lincoln and Morton maintained a close alliance during the war, although Lincoln was wary at times of Morton's ruthlessness. Lincoln also recognized the Indiana governor had significant fears, once remarking that Morton was "a good fellow, but at times he is the skeeredest person I know." Morton was especially afraid that Kentucky, across the Ohio River from Indiana's southern border, would secede from the Union and pose a threat to Indiana's security.

Morton went to great lengths to ensure that Indiana contributed as much as possible to the war effort. He was not afraid to criticize others if he felt Indiana's interests were being overlooked. Morton frequently clashed with federal authorities and military leaders over recruitment policies, regimental assignments, appointment of military leaders, purchases of supplies, and the care given to sick and wounded soldiers, among other issues. Although he wanted Indiana to receive as much recognition as other states, Morton's political opponents often challenged his efforts. Governor Morton once complained to Lincoln that "no other free state is so populated with southerners", which he believed kept him from being as forceful as he wanted to be.

In 1862 Morton attended the Loyal War Governors' Conference in Altoona, Pennsylvania, organized by Pennsylvania Governor Andrew Gregg Curtin, that gave Lincoln the support needed for his Emancipation Proclamation. Emancipation and the conscription of men to fight a protracted war became major issues that divided Republicans and Democrats during Morton's tenure as governor.

=== Conflict with the General Assembly ===
Although Morton was able to keep the state united during the first phase of the war, once emancipation became an issue in 1862, the Republicans suffered a major defeat in the mid-term elections, and Morton lost the support of the strong Democratic majority in the legislature. Before the new legislature convened in 1863, Morton began circulating reports that the Democrats intended to seize control of the state government, secede from the Union, and instigate riots. The Democrats responded with harsh criticisms of Morton and Lincoln, the conduct of the war, and the issues of emancipation and the loss of constitutional rights, among others. Accusations on both sides created a tense atmosphere that only worsened relation between the two parties and guaranteed further confrontations.

Morton had already made several unconstitutional moves by acting on his own authority without legislative approval, including the establishment of the state arsenal, and the Democrats drafted legislation that attempted to reduce his authority. When Democrats in the state legislature sought to remove the state militia from Morton's command and transfer it to a state board of Democratic commissioners, the governor immediately disbanded the Indiana General Assembly. He feared that once in control of militia, the Democrats might attempt to force him from office and secede from the Union. Morton issued secret instructions to Republican legislators, asking them to stay away from Indianapolis, the state capital, to prevent the General Assembly from attaining the quorum needed to pass any legislation. All but four Republicans fled to Madison, Indiana, where they could quickly flee into Kentucky if the Democrats attempted to force their return to Indianapolis.

Without the enactment of an appropriations bill, the state government would not have funds to operate, and the Democrats assumed that Morton would be forced to call a special session and recall the Republicans. The Democrats hoped to once again press their measures to weaken the governor, but Morton was aware of their plans. Going beyond his constitutional powers, Morton solicited millions of dollars in federal and private loans. Morton's move to subvert the state legislature was successful; he was able to privately fund the state government and the war effort in Indiana. Former Hoosier James Lanier of the New York banking firm of Winslow, Lanier and Company loaned Morton funds to pay interest on the state's debt until the state government could resume its revenue collecting efforts.

Morton's moves caused considerable rage among the Democrats, who launched a vicious attack on the governor. He responded by accusing his Democratic opponents of treason. Following the suppression of the General Assembly in 1862, Morton asked General Henry B. Carrington for assistance in organizing the state's levies for service. He also established an intelligence network under Carrington's leadership to deal with rebel sympathizers affiliated with the Knights of the Golden Circle, and, beginning in 1863, the American Knights, which merged with the Sons of Liberty. Members of these secret groups included Democrats and others who supported states-rights and opposed the Union cause during the war. Carrington succeeded in keeping the state secure, but his operatives also carried out arbitrary arrests, suppressed freedom of speech and freedom of association, and generally maintained repressive control over the southern-sympathetic minority. In an incident that would later be referred to as the Battle of Pogue's Run, Morton had soldiers disrupt a Democratic state convention, where many leaders of the Democratic Party were arrested, detained, or threatened. Morton also urged pro-war Democrats to abandon their party in the name of unity for the duration of the war, and met with some success. Former governor Joseph A. Wright was among the Democrats who had been expelled from the party in 1854, and in an attempt to show his bipartisanship, Morton appointed him to the U.S. Senate.

In reaction to Morton's actions against dissenters, the Indiana Democratic Party called Morton a "Dictator" and an "Underhanded Mobster". Republicans countered that the Democrats were using "treasonable and obstructionist tactics in the conduct of the war". Morton illegally—without approval from the state legislature—called out the state militia in July 1863 to counter Morgan's Raid, an incident where Confederate raiders under Confederate General John Hunt Morgan crossed the Ohio River into southern Indiana. Large-scale support for the Confederacy among Golden Circle members and southern Hoosiers in general declined after Morgan's raiders ransacked many homes bearing the banners of the Golden Circle, despite their proclaimed support for the Confederate cause. After Hoosiers failed to support Morgan's troops in significant numbers, Morton slowed his crackdown on Confederate sympathizers within the state, theorizing that because the Copperheads had failed to come to Morgan's aid in large numbers, they would similarly fail to aid a larger invasion.

Despite his controversial actions, one notable thing historians record from this period during Morton's first term as governor was the honesty with which the government was run. All of the borrowed money was accounted for with no political corruption and repaid in the years after the war. It was by these honest actions that Morton was able to avoid repercussions when the state legislature reconvened after Morton's reelection, this time with a new Republican majority.

=== Second term ===
In 1864 the war was nearing its end, but many Hoosiers were war weary and saw no end in sight as they prepared for the state's next gubernatorial election. Indiana's constitution prohibited a governor to serve more than four years in any eight-year period, but Morton was elected as Indiana's lieutenant governor in 1860 and had only been completing Lane's term, so he claimed that was eligible to run for governor in the upcoming election. The Democrats were furious and launched a bitter campaign against Morton, who did not do a great deal of campaigning. Instead, he successfully returned about 9,000 active-duty soldiers home on leave to vote in the election, presumably for Morton, "the soldier's friend", and his fellow Republicans.

Morton was reelected to office, defeating Democrat and longtime friend Joseph McDonald by more than 20,000 votes. Although the campaign was conducted in time of war, with both parties strongly opposing the other, both Morton and McDonald remained friends after the campaign and later served together in the U.S. Senate. Many Democrats claimed that Morton had rigged the election because Republicans retook the majority in both houses of the Assembly.

Morton was partially crippled by a paralytic stroke in October 1865 which incapacitated him for a time. For treatment, Morton traveled to Europe where he sought the assistance of several specialists, but none were able to help his paralysis. During his recovery, Lieutenant Governor Conrad Baker served as acting governor. With the war ending, Baker oversaw the demobilization of most of the state's forces. Morton returned to the governorship in March 1866, but he was never again able to walk without assistance.

== Senator ==
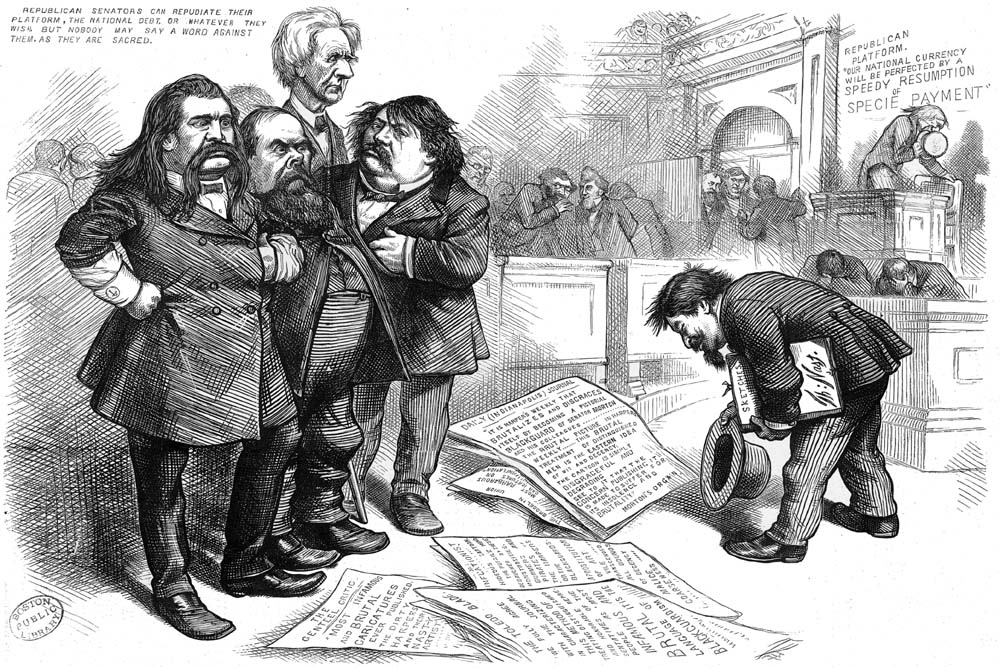
Thomas Nast asks Morton and three other huffy-looking inflationist senators, Simon Cameron, John A. Logan, and Matthew Carpenter, to pardon him for his caricatures, Harper's Weekly, June 6, 1874

=== First term ===
In 1867, Morton was elected by the Indiana General Assembly to serve as a U.S. Senator. He resigned from his post as governor that same year and turned over the leadership of the state government to Lieutenant Governor Baker. In the U.S. Senate, Morton became a member of the foreign affairs committee and quickly grew to become a Republican leader. He was also made chairman of the Committee of Privileges and Elections. Because of his stroke, Morton always sat while delivering his speeches, but he was noted by other senators for his effectiveness in speaking and debating.

Morton's close observers saw a man of untiring activity, "of unfaltering determination, quick as well as far-seeing..." Restless and full of energy, one newspaper commentated, "He accommodated himself with a kind of cynical indifference to his crippled body, as to a house badly out of repair, and dragged it about with him as a snail does a shell." As a U.S. Senator, "he excused himself from no duties; acted as chairman and member of several committees; was never absent from his seat, and was ready for debate at all times."

Unfriendly sources described Morton in exceedingly negative terms. "With a superabundance of the quality called 'force,' Senator Morton possesses one of the most terrible natures in public life," and as news correspondent George Alfred Townsend described him: "A dark, determined, brooding and desperate mind is reflected in his warthy complexion and introspective eyes. His powerful frame, prematurely wrecked, yet carrying alive the savage will, towers on his crutch, and in his very hobble is the tyrant's pace.... He wants to be terrible for the sake of freedom. His conscience and fortitude are thus fed from his fanaticism. Like all bloody bigots, he thinks he feels God's mercy moving in him."

Morton, who served in the U.S. Senate during Reconstruction, supported much of the Radical Republican program for re-making the former Confederate states. Early in his first term, Morton supported legislation to eliminate all civil government in the southern states and impose a military government. He also supported legislation to void the southern states' constitutions—in nearly every case imposed in 1865 without being submitted to the voters—and to require elections for representatives to state constitutional conventions that would be charged with writing new ones. In addition, he voted in favor of provisions declaring that the new state constitutions would go into effect only if adopted by a majority of registered voters, not just those voting in the special elections that called for the constitutions' adoption. At the same time, he favored stringent restrictions on former Confederates who were permitted to vote, in particular those who had taken an oath to support the United States Constitution, and had served the Confederate States of America in a political office or in its military.

During the impeachment trial of President Andrew Johnson, Morton voted in favor of conviction, as did most moderate and all Radical Republicans, and openly voiced his disappointment at Johnson's acquittal. Although Morton delivered a speech in the fall of 1865 arguing that the recently freed slaves were unready for the vote, and once worked to end Indiana's so-called "Black Laws" that restricted blacks' basic civil rights, and the state constitutional provision forbidding their entry into the state, he reversed his position after the war. By 1866 Morton had come to share the general Republican belief that the only means of guaranteeing loyalty to governments protective of black civil rights must be through giving adult males of every race the franchise. As he explained, "I confess, and I do it without shame, that I have been educated by the great events of War." He championed the passage of the Fifteenth Amendment, and when the Democrats began to resign en masse from the Senate during its debate to prevent a quorum, Morton engineered a maneuver that kept the bill in the docket and allowed it to be passed.

U.S. Senator George Frisbie Hoar once judged Morton as a man with "little regard for Constitutional scruples." Not that Morton would have willfully flouted his oath to uphold the U.S. Constitution, but Hoar added, "he believed that the Constitution should be interpreted in the light of the Declaration of Independence, so as to be the law of life to a great, powerful, and free people. To this principle of interpretation, all strict or narrow criticism, founded on its literal meaning, must yield." If so, Hoar's assessment put Morton in the same category as U.S. Senator Charles Sumner, who openly declared the Declaration's decree that all men were created equal the defining words by which all constitutional duty should be judged.

After President-elect Ulysses S. Grant's inauguration in 1869, Morton became one of the Grant administration's most able and reliable floor leaders. Morton helped shepherd through the bill readmitting Virginia to representation in Congress and voted in favor of the treaty annexing Santo Domingo to the United States. Later, he countered Senate Foreign Relations Committee chairman Charles Sumner of Massachusetts in a bitter debate over the president's motives and intentions towards the Caribbean nation and its people. In the Senate Morton argued in favor of the Enforcement Act (1871), also known as the so-called Ku-Klux Act, that gave the president expanded power to oppose terrorism in the Deep South. Morton, known as a masterful waver of the "bloody shirt", was unstinting in his efforts to connect the Democrats to wartime treason and peacetime violence, and generally could be relied on to provide a ready and strong defense of the federal government's right to intervene and enforce the protection of the civil rights of black Americans. Morton championed the right of Louisiana's black leader, Pinckney B. S. Pinchback, to a seat in the U.S. Senate, although the effort was unsuccessful. Morton voted for the Civil Rights Act of 1875, and had his strongest support in 1876 among black Republicans in an increasingly "solid South".

The Grant administration, who recognized Morton as a powerful friend, offered him the position of Minister to Great Britain, replacing John Lothrop Motley, but Morton declined. Because the Indiana General Assembly was controlled by the Democrats, Morton feared a Democrat would be elected to his U.S. Senate seat. In 1874 similar concerns caused him to refuse invitations to accept a nomination to the Supreme Court of the United States. (Later, Grant recalled that concerns over Morton's ill health alone had kept him from proposing Morton for Chief Justice, but Grant may have mistaken. Well-advised sources at the time heard that the Senator from Indiana had been offered a place on the Supreme Court, unofficially, and Justice David Davis took the credit for convincing Grant that the rigor of the job would cause Morton a physical breakdown).

=== Second term ===
Morton was reelected to the U.S. Senate in 1873, and began his second term in 1874. His stand on paper money added to his controversial reputation. During a time of serious economic hardship and deflation, Morton favored a bill that would have added more paper currency to the money supply. He began his second term by leading the Senate's support for an inflation bill that President Grant vetoed. Morton's action was politically astute. In Indiana the demands for easy money topped the Democrats' list of priority issues, and in the fall of 1874, they carried the state's elections largely on that basis. However, within a year, Morton joined other Republicans in supporting the Specie Payment Resumption Act, which effectively suspended new currency issues and gave the U.S. Secretary of the Treasury the authority to withdraw currency from circulation.

In 1876 Morton was a contender for the Republican nomination for president at the party's National Convention in Cincinnati, Ohio. Richard W. Thompson offered Morton's name to the delegation at a nominee, but Morton's position on issuing paper money to inflate the currency, combined with his failing health, hurt his bid for the nomination among the convention delegates. However, neither of these issues made as much difference as Morton's association with the deeply discredited and scandal-ridden Grant administration. Morton's nomination would have made the Republicans vulnerable on both the Reconstruction and corruption issues. In addition, Grant's supporters had an alternative choice in U.S. Senator Roscoe Conkling of New York. Between the two nominees, the "stalwart" Republican bloc was divided, with no prospect of coming together because Conkling and Morton detested one another. When the balloting began, Morton's vote total placed him second to James G. Blaine, but Morton had slipped to fourth place by the sixth ballot. Blaine's opponents could only stop Blaine's nomination by uniting behind a candidate acceptable to reform-minded delegates and the stalwart bloc. On the seventh ballot nearly all the anti-Blaine delegates, including Morton's, united to give Rutherford B. Hayes the Republican nomination.

Morton ranked as one of the strongest members of the so-called "stalwart" faction of the Republican party: those members most deeply committed to protecting and preserving Republican governments in the South. Not surprisingly, during the winter of 1876–77, Morton was among the most aggressive supporters of Hayes's right to the presidency in a close election. When Morton was placed on the Electoral Commission, the group that determined the outcome of the election, there was never any doubt that his vote would be cast for Hayes. After Hayes's supporters made overtures to southern Democrats, offering assurances that the president-elect would take no active role in propping up Republican governors in Louisiana and South Carolina, there were fears that Morton might cause difficulties. In one speech Morton made it clear that the Democrats must make guarantees of fair play and equal rights for southern blacks, before he would support Hayes's program. The guarantees were given, or at least promises were made. To the general surprise of many, Hayes's policy withdrew military support from the Republican governments in those two states, and Morton proved to be one of the president's strongest defenders, urging that his fellow Republicans show patience and give the so-called "New Departure" time to prove itself.

=== Death ===
In 1877 Morton was named to lead a committee to investigate charges of bribery made against La Fayette Grover, a newly elected U.S. Senator from Oregon. The committee spent eighteen days in Oregon holding hearings and investigations. On the return trip, Morton detoured to San Francisco for a rest and visit. After dinner on the night of August 6, Morton suffered a severe stroke that paralyzed the left side of his body. The next day he was taken by train to Cheyenne, Wyoming Territory, where he was met by his brother-in-law, John A. Burbank, the former governor of the Dakota Territory. Morton was accompanied by him to the home of his mother-in-law in Richmond, Indiana, where he stayed until October 15, then he was moved to his own home in Indianapolis to recover. He remained at Indianapolis, surrounded by his family, until his death on November 1, 1877.

Morton's remains were laid in state at the Indiana Statehouse, before their removal to Indianapolis's Roberts Park Methodist Church, where his funeral service was held. The service was attended by many dignitaries from across the United States, and President Hayes ordered all flags to half-staff. Because the church could not hold the large crowd, thousands of mourners waited outside and followed in a long procession to witness the burial at Indianapolis's Crown Hill Cemetery.

== Legacy ==
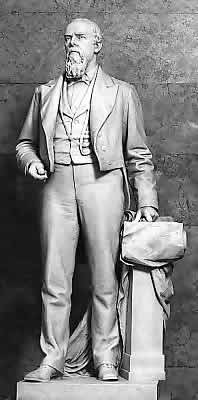
Oliver P. Morton in U.S. Statuary Hall

Morton remains "the most powerful, important, and controversial governor in Indiana history." To his admirers and supporters, Morton was a decisive, effective, ambitious, and energetic leader as governor of Indiana during the Civil War; his detractors would describe him as a wily and power-hungry politician, who shifted his stance on issues to suit prevailing views for his own political gain. Although his tactics were controversial, and on occasion unconstitutional, he remained a dominant political figure from 1861 to 1877. As one of Lincoln's "war governors", Morton was most successful in recruiting and equipping Union troops during the Civil War, and became known as "the soldier's friend", in tribute to his crucial efforts in supplying and supporting the Union soldiers in the field. Morton was also known for standing firm against his political opponents, whom he often antagonized by his ruthlessness, and they frequently responded with severe criticism of his actions.

=== Policies and criticism ===
Morton had many critics during his long tenure in government service. They derided the manner in which he ran Indiana's state government during the Civil War and criticized his open suppression of the freedom of speech, arrests and detentions of his political opponents, and violations of the state and federal constitutions on more than one occasion. Morton justified his forceful actions as "a necessary wartime measure" to protect Indiana and defend the Union. In the U.S. Senate he became one of the foremost defenders of Republican governments in the southern states. Recent historiography of Reconstruction has found Morton among the most consistent supporters of the cause of equal justice under the law.

Morton was a formidable personality, detested by his enemies, and vilified in opposition newspapers. According to one account, Morton had no leavening wit, no humor, no breadth of intellect, no sparkle of conversation, to attract those who disagreed with him politically. Another Republican was said to have declared, "His presence is a deadly poison" and "He is a sphinx; and I am repressed into dumbness when trying to hold a conversation with that man." According to a southern newspaper that opposed his actions, Morton was "a vice-reeking Hoosier bundle of moral and physical rottenness, leprous ulcers and caustic bandages, who loads down with plagues and pollutions the wings of every breeze that sweeps across his loathsome putrefying carcass." Other critics and political opponents called him a tyrant and a bully, highlighting his ruthlessness in denouncing, even defaming his enemies, and spreading rumors that he had been a shameless womanizer, forcing himself on every female applicant for favor at the governor's mansion. One Democratic journalist wrote, "There is not, probably, in this country, a more conscienceless, corrupt, and utterly profligate man in public life than Morton" and "He is rotten physically, morally and politically." It was even alleged that his paralysis came from some unspeakable social disease, brought on by his habits. When the Senator declared himself in favor of woman suffrage, the Saint Paul Pioneer was not surprised. "Why shouldn't Morton espouse the woman's cause?" it asked. "It is woman that has made him what he is -- so the gossips say."

None of his critics could make charges of corruption stick. Senator Morton was among the earliest to refuse any share in the so-called "back pay" that Congress awarded its members in 1873, and returned his money to the U.S. Treasury as soon as it was given to him. Morton was untouched by the Crédit Mobilier scandal. A hostile Democratic House scoured the official files for some evidence of bribe-taking or shakedowns in awarding Civil War contracts, and came up empty-handed. For others, despite holding many positions that angered his opponents, Morton was highly regarded for remaining clean of graft during the war period when corruption was commonplace. For his honest conduct he was offered the thanks of the Indiana General Assembly and others on numerous occasions. After Morton learned that President Grant had nominated his son, John M. Morton, for Registrar of the Land Office in Dakota Territory, the Senator immediately wrote to ask that the selection be withdrawn, protest that he could not afford to have any relative appointed to any political office.

After the poor decision-making of Senators Jesse D. Bright and Graham N. Fitch, Morton succeeded in raising Indiana to national prominence during his lifetime. The state and its citizens were once the common subject of jokes to the eastern states, but much of that ceased after the Civil War.

=== Memorials ===
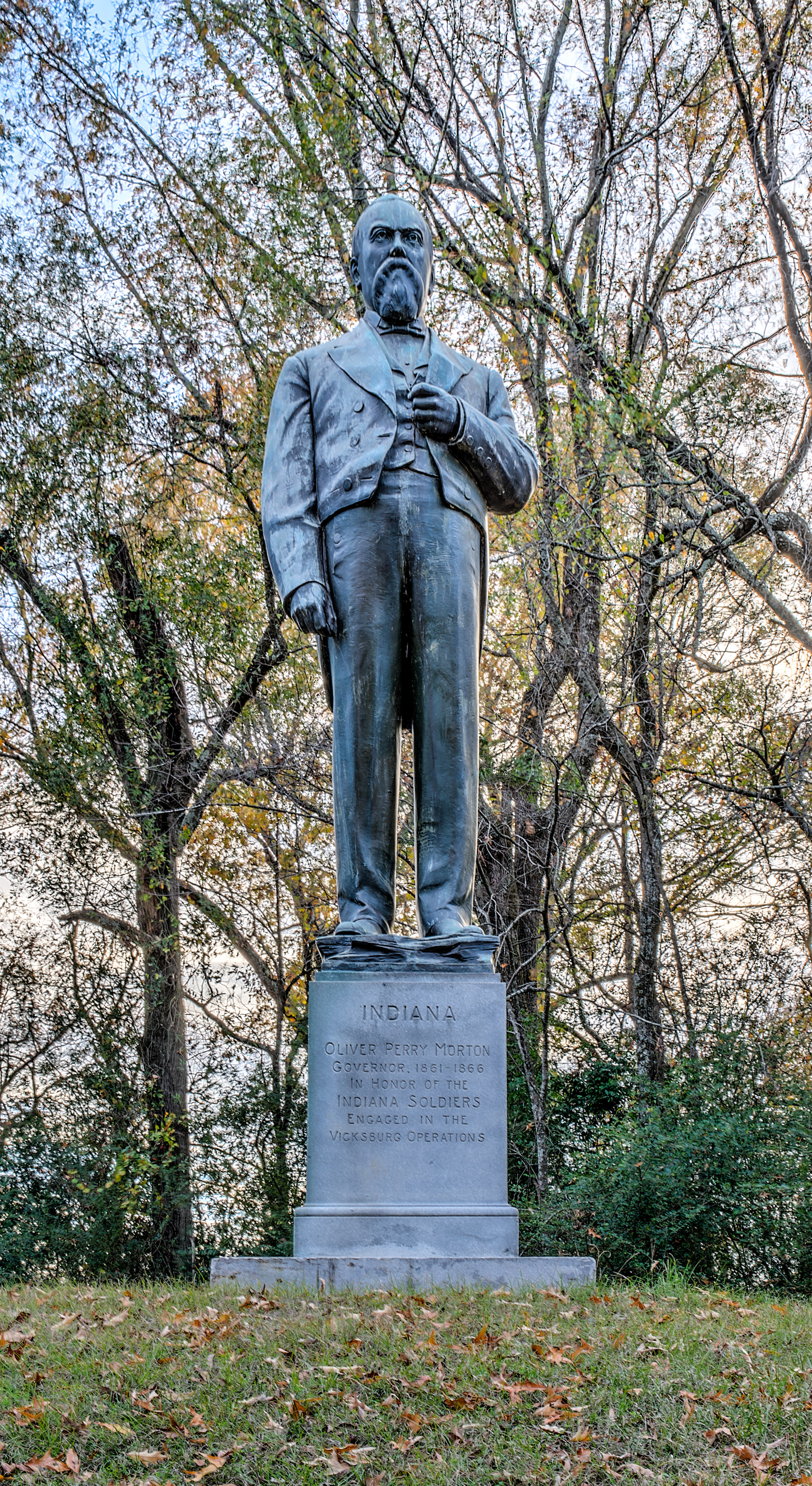
Statue of Morton by George Brewster at Vicksburg National Military Park

Morton is memorialized in the United States Capitol as one of Indiana's two statues in the National Statuary Hall Collection (Oliver P. Morton). A 1926 statue of Governor Morton by George Brewster serves as the Indiana State Memorial at Vicksburg National Military Park in Vicksburg, Mississippi, in honor of his role as a powerful wartime governor.

There are two statues of Morton in downtown Indianapolis. A statue on the east side of the Indiana Statehouse, facing Capitol Avenue, by sculptor Rudolf Schwarz was dedicated in 1907. The other statue, created by sculptor Frank Simmons, was installed in 1864 on Monument Circle, when it served as a city park, and was moved to its new location to become part of the Circle's Indiana Soldiers' and Sailors' Monument around 1899.

A statue of Morton stands on the second floor of the Wayne County Courthouse in Richmond, Indiana, where a previous high school was named for him; the central section of the current high school is named Morton Hall in his honor. Morton Senior High School in Hammond, Indiana, home of the Morton Governors, is named after him. The annual yearbook of Centerville Senior High School in Centerville, Indiana, is called The Mortonian in honor of Gov. Morton. Morton County, Kansas, and Morton County, North Dakota, are named in his honor.

The Oliver P. Morton House at Centerville was added to the National Register of Historic Places in 1975.

== See also ==
- History of slavery in Indiana
- List of members of the United States Congress who died in office (1790–1899)
- List of governors of Indiana

== Notes ==
Party political offices
First	Republican nominee for Governor of Indiana; 1856	Succeeded by Henry S. Lane
Preceded by Henry S. Lane	Republican nominee for Governor of Indiana; 1864	Succeeded by Conrad Baker
Political offices
Preceded by Abram A. Hammond	Lieutenant Governor of Indiana; 1861	Succeeded by Conrad Baker
Preceded by Henry S. Lane	Governor of Indiana; 1861–1867	Succeeded by Conrad Baker
U.S. Senate
Preceded by Henry S. Lane	U.S. senator (Class 3) from Indiana; March 4, 1867 – November 1, 1877; Served alongside: Thomas A. Hendricks, Daniel D. Pratt and Joseph E. McDonald	Succeeded by Daniel W. Voorhees
