= Ashbel P. Willard =

American politician (1820–1860)

Ashbel Parsons Willard
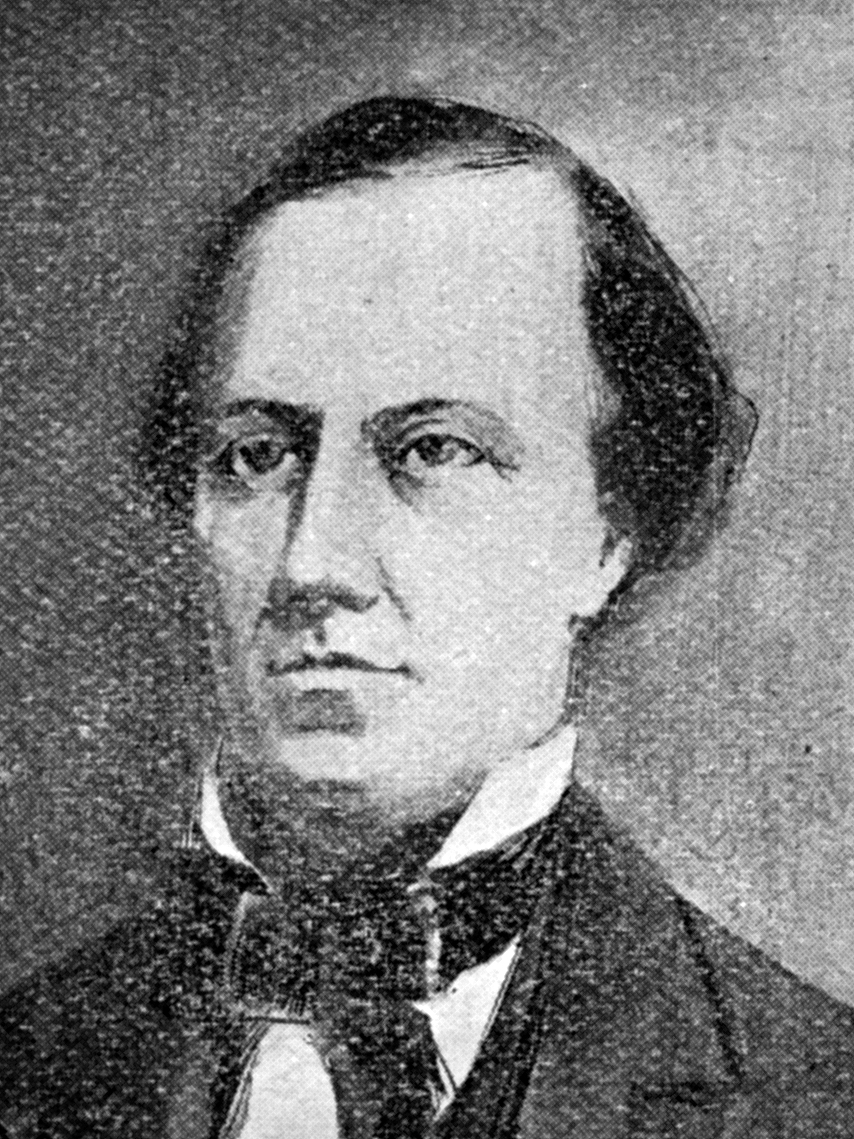

11th Governor of Indiana
- In office January 12, 1857 – October 4, 1860
- Lieutenant: Abram A. Hammond
- Preceded by: Joseph A. Wright
- Succeeded by: Abram A. Hammond

12th Lieutenant Governor of Indiana
- In office January 10, 1853 – January 12, 1857
- Governor: Joseph A. Wright
- Preceded by: James H. Lane
- Succeeded by: Abram A. Hammond

Indiana House of Representatives
- In office December 5, 1850 – December 4, 1852

Personal details
- Born: Ashbel Parsons Willard; October 31, 1820 Oneida County, New York, U.S.
- Died: October 4, 1860 (aged 39) Saint Paul, Minnesota, U.S.
- Party: Democratic
- Education: Hamilton College

Ashbel Parsons Willard (October 31, 1820 – October 4, 1860) was state representative, the 12th lieutenant governor, and the 11th governor of the U.S. state of Indiana. His terms in office were marked by increasingly severe partisanship leading to the breakup of the state Democratic Party in the years leading up to the American Civil War. His brother-in-law John Edwin Cook was involved in John Brown's raid on Harpers Ferry, and was executed. Willard went to the south to advocate unsuccessfully for his release, and became despised by southerners who accused him of having a secret involvement in the raid. He died two months before the start of the war while giving a speech on national unity, and was the first governor of Indiana to die in office.

== Early life ==
=== Family and background ===
Ashbel Parsons Willard was born on October 31, 1820, in Oneida County, New York, the son of Erastus and Sarah Parsons Willard. His father farmed and was the county sheriff. There he attended Hamilton College and studied law with Judge Barker. He moved to Marshall, Michigan, in 1842 and lived there for about a year. In 1843 he made a trip to Texas on horseback and on his return stopped in Carrollton, Kentucky; he so liked the town he settled there for a year and became a local school teacher. After living there about a year there he moved again to Louisville, Kentucky, where he continued teaching. In his spare time he read and studied.

In the 1844 election Willard, a Democrat, stumped all around the Louisville area and southern Indiana for James Polk who ultimately won the election. While on the stump the people of New Albany, Indiana, so liked him that they invited him to come live in their community. He accepted their offer and moved there in the spring of 1845 and set up a law office. Finding there to be a lack of clients, he also worked for a time as a writer in the clerk's office to obtain extra income. He met Carline C. Cook, a town native, and was married to her in 1847. The couple had three children, but the oldest, Ashbel P. Willard Jr. died from scarlet fever at age three. New Albany remained Willard's home for the rest of his life.

=== Legislator ===
In 1849 Willard became a New Albany councilman, furthering his local popularity. In 1850 he was elected to the Indiana House of Representatives as New Albany's representative. He chaired the states Ways and Means Committee, became Speaker of the House. His rapid progress quickly led him to become a leader in the state Democratic Party. In the General Assembly he was known for his wit and oratory, and won most debates he entered.

In 1852 he was nominated to the candidate for Lieutenant Governor of Indiana at the state Democratic Convention. His quick rise in the party was attributed to his exceptional oratory and political skills. The ticket won, in large part because of the stumping of Willard, and he served with Governor Joseph A. Wright. Willard was bitterly antagonistic towards the Know-Nothing party, newly formed from disaffected Whigs, the Free Soil Party, and the Liberty Party. His derision toward them in the Senate created problems for him when its member later joined the Republican Party. During his time as President of the Senate, the senate was closely split between the parties. When the measure to enter a joint session to elect a new United States Senator, the Senate had a tie vote. Knowing that given the number of Know-Nothings in the House they would be a majority in a joint session, Willard refused to break the tie and Indiana remained several years with only one Senator in Congress.

== Governor ==
=== Campaign ===
In 1856 Willard was nominated to run as the Democratic Candidate for Governor on the Democratic ticket. He was opposed in the election by Oliver P. Morton, the most influential man among the Know-Nothing opposition. The remnants of the Whig party supported his bid and did not field their own candidate. The election was referred to as the "battle of the Giants", and was one of the most divisive in the history of the state. Both men being among the most astute politicians in the history of the state.

The state Democratic party had been undergoing a major division during the two years preceding the campaign. The former Governor Wright was very unpopular with the party's leadership, and party leader Jesse D. Bright. Wright and other members were expelled from the party when they failed to support the Kansas-Nebraska Act, which the leaders treated as a loyalty test. Many of the expelled and their constituents launched numerous personal attacks against Willard. Much like the nation, Indiana had split along northern and southern lines. Resident of southern Indiana, who were predominantly of southern ancestry, went democrat. Northern Indiana residents who were dominantly of northern origin, voted for the Know-Nothings. Willard won the close election by about six thousand votes.

=== Deadlock ===
Shortly after his election, Willard traveled to a Mississippi governors' meeting where he openly voiced his support for state-rights, southern slavery, and the Fugitive Slave Law. His statements caused an uproar in Indiana among his adversaries. Willard's term was marked with severe partisanship and in-fighting in the Democratic Party. The Know-Nothing Party fell apart during the first two years of his term, but was replaced by the strengthening Republican Party, which absorbed most its members. The divisive atmosphere left the General Assembly in deadlock for most of his term, leading him to call the first special session of the body in state history, because the parties could not agree on the terms of a budget.

In 1857 mid-term elections, the Republicans gained control of the Senate, and the Democrats retook the House after absorbing the remaining Whigs. The state still only had one US Senator, and the governor was hoping to have the assembly elect one, and nominate Jesse D. Bright to return to the Senate. The opposition was more hostile to Bright, primarily because of his actions regarding slavery. The Republicans were still angry over Willard's blocking their Senate pick, so the Senate decided to reciprocate his actions, refusing to enter the joint session necessary to elect a senator. Willard instructed the Democrats to meet without the Republicans and elect a Senator anyway. The dubious legality of the issue was considered outrageous by the Republicans and raised the tension to a fever pitch.

In 1857 the move by pro-slavery forced in Kansas to legalize slavery caused a stir nationwide. Willard came out in support of the pro-slavery position, and supported President James Buchanan or Stephen Douglas. The event was the breaking point for the state's Democratic party. Most of the party's newspapers came out strongly against Willard, and numerous members began to switch to the Republican Party. In 1858 the legislature launched an investigation on the sale of public land in northeast Indiana. They discovered that over $100,000 had been embezzled by commissioners that had been appointed by the governor. Legislators began accusing Willard of corruption. He ignored their attacks, but removed the commissioners.

=== John Brown's raid ===
While governor, Willard's brother-in-law John Cook was involved in John Brown's Raid on Harpers Ferry, Virginia (since 1863, West Virginia), armed insurrection to free slaves in Virginia, and sentenced to death. Willard, determined to save his brother-in-law, went to him in prison and arranged to have his cell left open so he could escape. Cook refused to be released and was subsequently executed despite Willard's pleas to Virginia Governor Henry A. Wise to stay his death sentence. Governor Wise accused Willard of being behind the entire affair, claiming to have secret intelligence from Washington D.C. Wise claimed that Willard had sought Brown's services through his brother-in-law and secretly commissioned the insurrection. Willard was vilified in newspapers across the South and even in some part of the North.

Willard found himself on the opposite side of the slavery debate as his brother-in-law. Although Indiana was a free state, he thought Southerners should maintain the right to determine the slavery issue for their selves. Unable to run for reelection, Willard helped ensure the nomination of Thomas A. Hendricks for governor in 1860 to run against Republican Henry S. Lane, who had Oliver Morton as a Lieutenant Governor.

== Death and legacy ==
Willard had been in poor health for some years, and it began to deteriorate quickly in 1860. That year the Democratic Party was struggling with internal problems, and the nation was on the brink of Civil War. Willard attended the state Democratic convention in Columbus, his last political appearance in the state. His party was so wracked with problems, it was proposed by a party member that the crowd give three cheers for the Republican candidates, who they believed would save the Union. Willard quickly ascended to the podium and rebuked the crowd and begged for unity. His speech was so forceful, he quickly became more ill than ever. His lungs began hemorrhaging, but his doctors were able to stop the bleeding. Shortly after, Willard traveled to St. Paul, Minnesota, on a tour to promote goodwill among the states. Willard died from internal bleeding while giving a speech there on October 4, 1860. He was the first Governor of Indiana to die in office. He was laid in state in Indianapolis and his bier was attended by thousands, and buried in New Albany. His grave was unmarked until May 30, 1928, when the State of Indiana erected a gravestone after they were petitioned by the Floyd County Historical Society to appropriate $500.00 to erect a gravestone.

Willard was succeeded by his Lieutenant Governor Abram Hammond who fulfilled the final three months of his term. Willard's death had profound negative consequences for the state Democratic Party, who lost the election primarily because they were unable to field a new candidate very quickly, although it has been debated whether they could have won. Although he helped keep the Democrats in control of the General Assembly going into the Civil War, things quickly feel apart for his party. As the primary enforcer of party unity, the duty fell to Jesse D. Bright, who was soon caught up in scandal. Many members of the party joined the Republicans and two decades would pass before his party would regain power.

== See also ==
- List of governors of Indiana
- Bust of Governor Ashbel Parsons Willard at Indiana Statehouse

Party political offices
Preceded by Joseph A. Wright	Democratic nominee for Governor of Indiana; 1856	Succeeded by Thomas A. Hendricks
Political offices
Preceded by James H. Lane	Lieutenant Governor of Indiana; 1853 – 1857	Succeeded by Abram A. Hammond
Preceded by Joseph A. Wright	Governor of Indiana; January 12, 1857 – October 4, 1860	Succeeded by Abram A. Hammond
