= Statue of Oliver P. Morton =

Statue in the U.S. Capitol

Oliver P. Morton
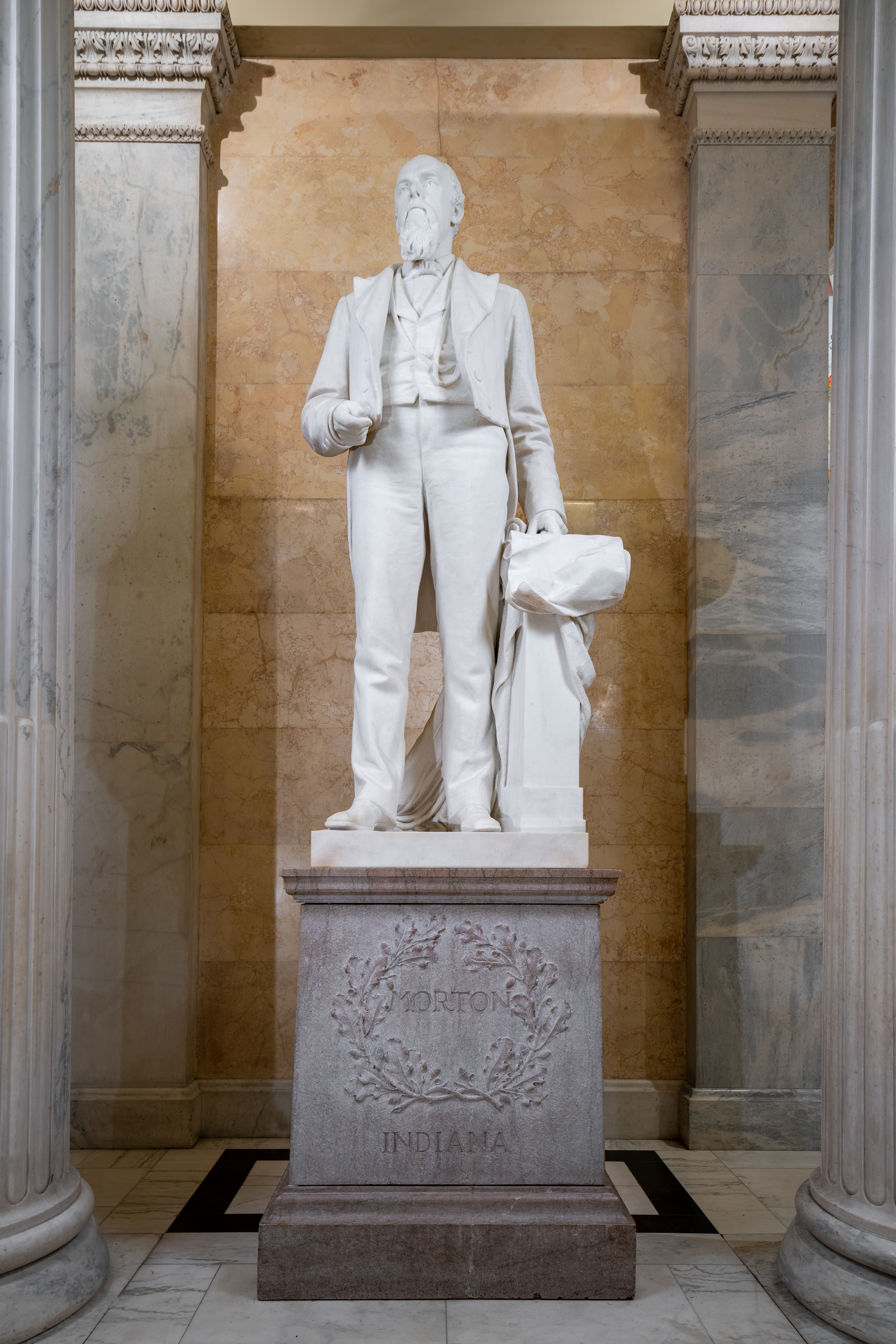
- The statue at the Hall of Columns in 2023
- Artist: Charles Henry Niehaus
- Subject: Oliver P. Morton

Oliver P. Morton is a 1900 marble statue of Governor Oliver P. Morton by Charles Henry Niehaus installed in the United States Capitol, in Washington, D.C., as part of the National Statuary Hall Collection. It is one of two statues donated by the state of Indiana. The statue was accepted into the collection on April 14, 1900, by Indiana Senator Albert J. Beveridge.

The statue is one of eight that Niehaus has had placed in the Collection.
