= 1856 Indiana gubernatorial election =

- October 6, 1856
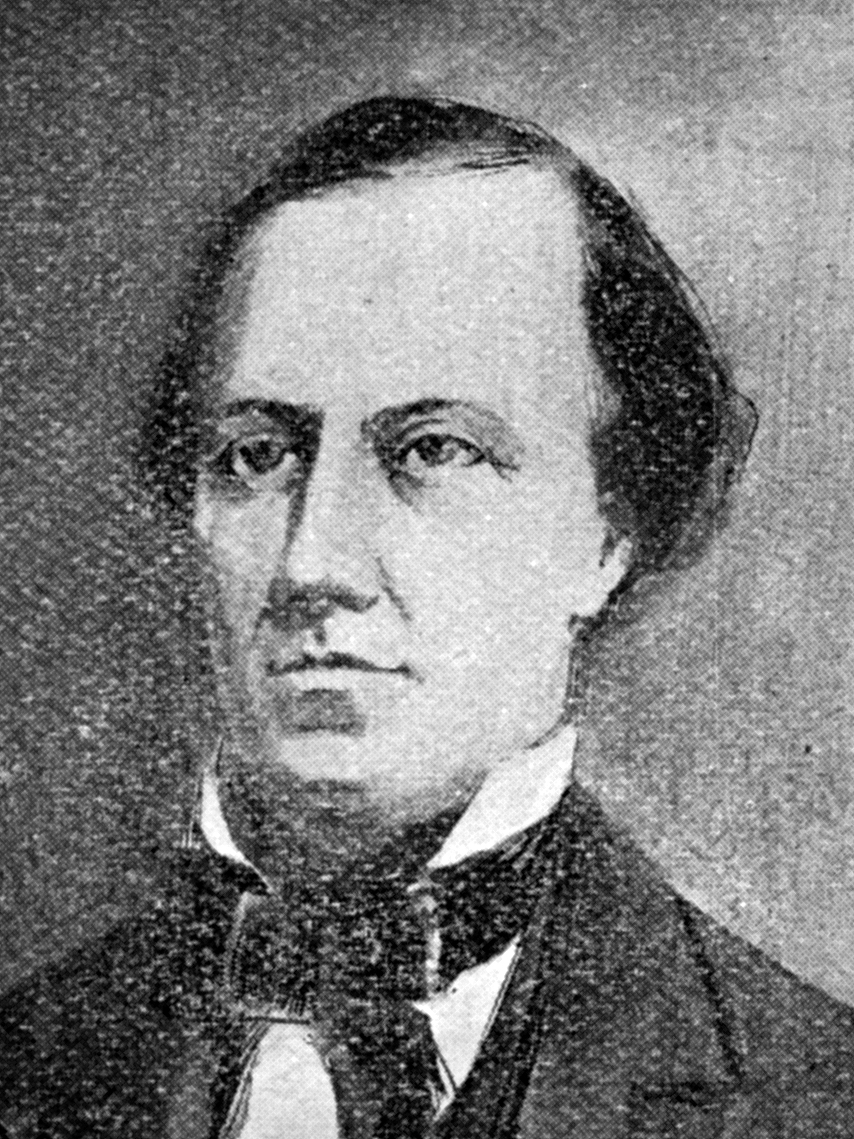

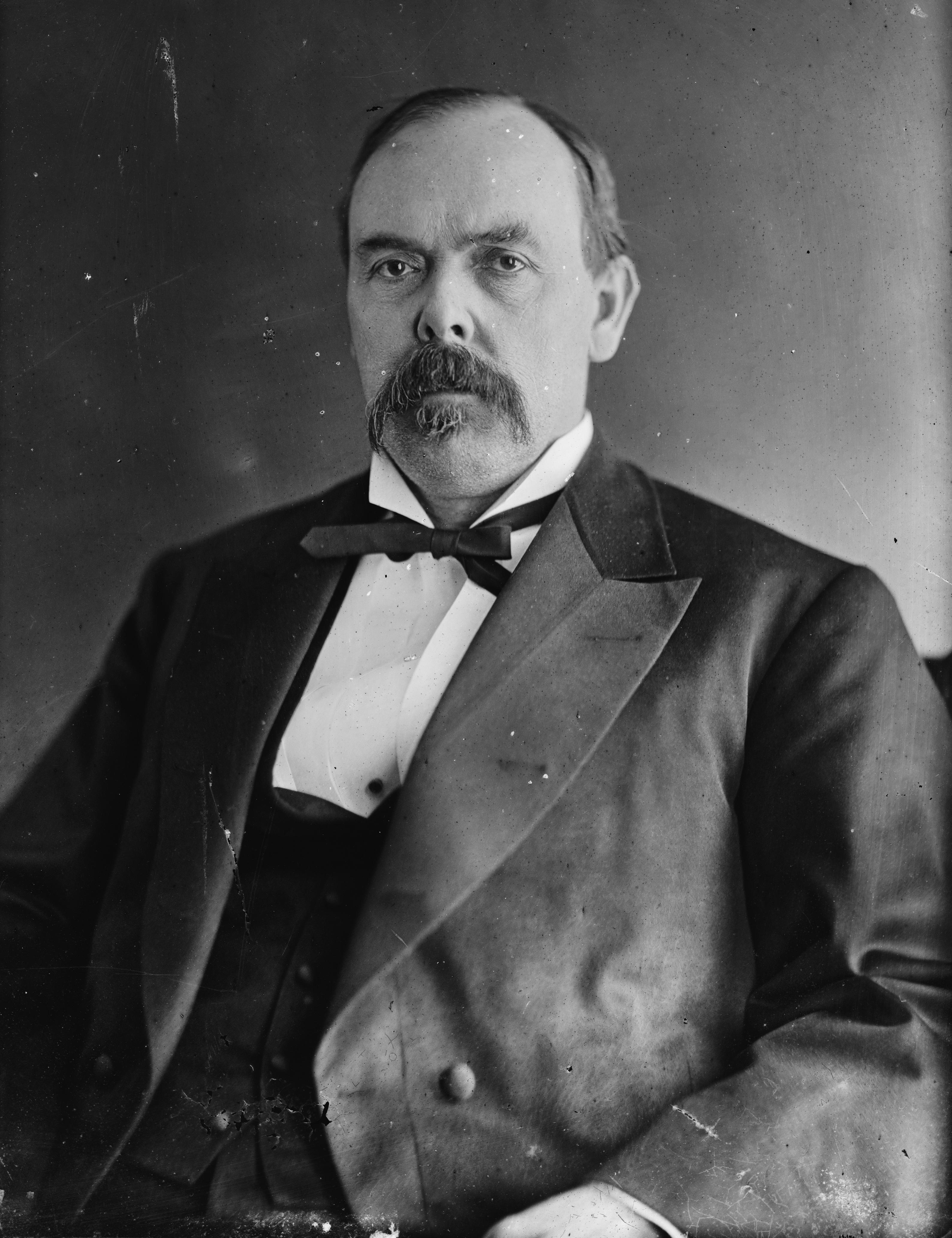
Nominee	Ashbel P. Willard	Oliver P. Morton
Party	Democratic	People's
Popular vote	117,971	112,039
Percentage	51.29%	48.71%
- County results Willard: 50–60% 60–70% 70–80% 80–90% Morton: 50–60% 60–70% 70–80%
Governor before election
Joseph A. Wright
Democratic
Elected Governor
Ashbel P. Willard
Democratic

The 1856 Indiana gubernatorial election was held on October 6, 1856, in order to elect the Governor of Indiana. Incumbent Democratic Lieutenant Governor of Indiana Ashbel P. Willard defeated People's Party nominee Oliver P. Morton.

== General election ==
On election day, October 6, 1856, Democratic nominee Ashbel P. Willard won the election by a margin of 5,932 votes against his opponent People's Party nominee Oliver P. Morton, thereby retaining Democratic control over the office of Governor. Willard was sworn in as the 11th Governor of Indiana on January 12, 1857.

=== Results ===
Indiana gubernatorial election, 1856
Party	Candidate	Votes	%
Democratic	Ashbel P. Willard	117,971	51.29
People's	Oliver P. Morton	112,039	48.71
Total votes		130,010	100.00
Democratic hold			
