= Abram A. Hammond =

American politician

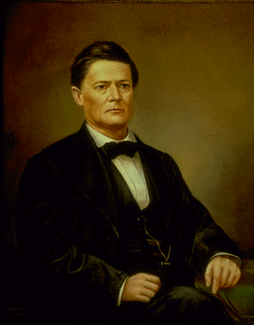

13th Lieutenant Governor of Indiana
- In office January 12, 1857 – October 3, 1860
- Governor: Ashbel P. Willard
- Preceded by: Ashbel P. Willard
- Succeeded by: Oliver P. Morton

12th Governor of Indiana
- In office October 4, 1860 – January 14, 1861
- Lieutenant: Vacant
- Preceded by: Ashbel P. Willard
- Succeeded by: Henry S. Lane

Personal details
- Born: March 21, 1814 Brattleboro, Vermont, US
- Died: August 27, 1874 (aged 60) Denver, Colorado, US
- Resting place: Crown Hill Cemetery and Arboretum, Section 2, Lot 111; 39.8183987°N 86.1736582°W
- Party: Whig, Democrat

Abram Adams Hammond (March 21, 1814 – August 27, 1874) was the 12th governor of the U.S. state of Indiana. He succeeded to the office upon the death of Governor Ashbel P. Willard and completed the remaining three months of Willard's term.

== Early life ==
Hammond was born in Brattleboro, Vermont, on March 21, 1814, the son of Nathaniel and Patty Ball Hammond. He moved to Indiana at the age of six when his family settled in Brookville, Indiana. He attended school and later studied law and was admitted to the bar. In 1835 he moved to Greenfield where he opened a law office. He married Mary Ansden in 1838 and the couple had one daughter. In 1840 he moved again this time to Columbus where he partnered in a law office with John H. Bradley. He was briefly the prosecuting attorney for Bartholomew County.

He moved again in 1846 to Indianapolis where he and his partner relocated their law office. They moved again in 1847 to Cincinnati, Ohio. Still on the move, they returned to Indianapolis in 1849, adding Hugh O'Neal to their law firm. In 1850 the Indiana legislature created a Court of Common Pleas, and Hammond was selected to become its first judge. He held the post only briefly, and resigned in 1852 to move to San Francisco to form a new law office with Rufus A. Lockwood. He returned to Indiana in 1853 and in 1855 moved to Terre Haute, where he formed yet another law office with Thomas H. Nelson. He remained in Terre Haute until he was elected lieutenant governor.

== Political career ==
In 1852, John C. Walker was nominated by the Democratic Convention to be the candidate for lieutenant governor. But when it was found he was ineligible due to his age, the party's Central Committee chose Hammond, a former Whig. The remnants of the state Whig Party completely integrated with the state Democratic party in 1852, and Hammond was one of its many pro-slavery member who merged. Hammond was included in the 1856 Democratic ticket as lieutenant governor with Governor Ashbel P. Willard, in hopes of drawing the Whigs who had gone to the Republican Party.

When Governor Willard died on October 5, 1860, Hammond was raised to the position of Governor where he served for three months. The death of Willard left the Democratic party without a candidate for governor. Hammond did not seek reelection as the party was in the midst of splitting with many member leaving to join the new Republican Party. Hammond supported Stephen Douglas. Hammond continued to advocate for the peaceful solution to the issue of slavery.

His only act of significance was an address to the General Assembly on January 11, 1860. In it he suggested several new laws, and offered a temporary solution to the problems caused by the gridlock in the assembly. His main theme, though, was to maintain harmony in the Union. He said,

It gives me great pleasure to say that Indiana as a state, has hitherto faithfully kept the bond of Union with all her sister States. Her record is unstained by any act of bad faith. She has never attempted, directly or indirectly, the evade or avoid any of the requirements of the Federal Constitution, and no man could doubt that if the same could be said of every other state, instead of discord, harmony would reign throughout our borders. Let us take pride in maintaining the high position we have thus far occupied as a conservative, union-loving state, and while we throw our weight into the scale in favor of any practice mode of settling the present trouble, let us continue to aid in the permanent and more lasting settlement that must flow from any restoration of amity and cordiality among our people, North and South.

In his speech, Hammond convinced the Assembly to send delegates to a Peace Congress held among most of the states in an attempt to negotiate a compromise on the slavery issue and avoid war. A delegation was sent, but voted unanimously against the conventions Crittenden Compromise, which would have given concessions to the south to avoid the war. The nation was, however, already set for war, and Indiana would become to first western state to mobilize forces for the invasion of the south less than four months later.

Soon after he had completed his term as governor, Hammond came to be severely afflicted with rheumatism and asthma, and retired from public life. He moved to Denver where he believed the warmer and drier climate would ease his suffering. He died there on August 27, 1874. His body was returned to Indianapolis for a ceremony and he was buried in Crown Hill Cemetery (Section 2, Lot 111).

== See also ==
- List of governors of Indiana

Political offices
Preceded by Ashbel P. Willard	Lieutenant Governor of Indiana; January 12, 1857 – October 3, 1860	Succeeded by Oliver P. Morton
Preceded by Ashbel P. Willard	Governor of Indiana; October 4, 1860 – January 14, 1861	Succeeded by Henry S. Lane
