= Henry Dexter (sculptor) =

American sculptor

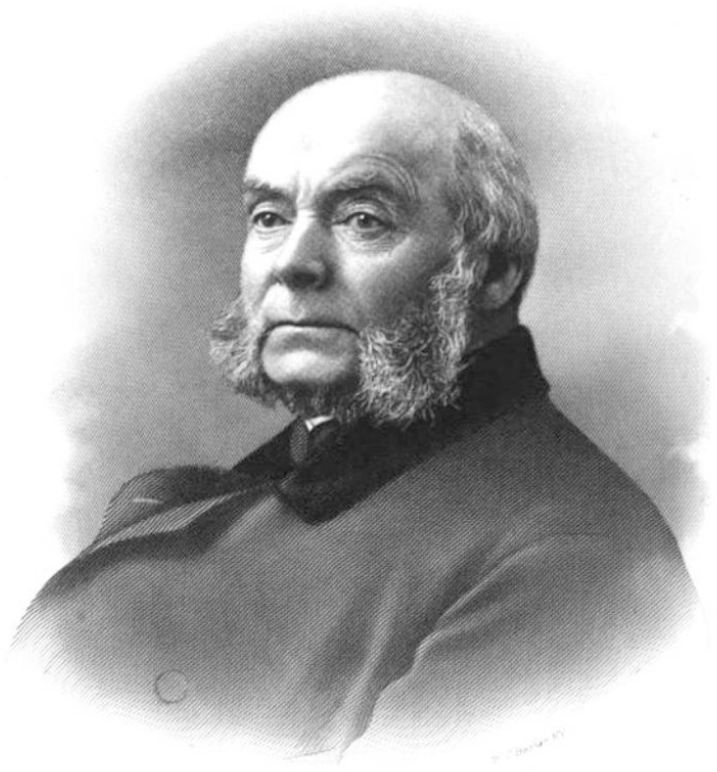
- Born: October 11, 1806; Nelson, New York
- Died: June 23, 1876 (aged 69); Cambridge, Massachusetts
- Occupation: Sculptor

Signature
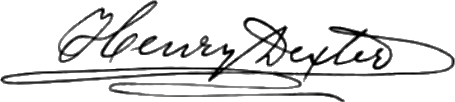

Henry Dexter (1806–1876) was an American sculptor.

== Life and career ==
Henry Dexter was born in Nelson, New York on October 11, 1806. He was apprenticed to a blacksmith shortly after his father's death when his family moved to Connecticut. Dexter taught himself to paint, but was aided in the process by artist Francis Alexander who was his wife's uncle. He moved to Boston in 1836 and opened his own portrait studio. Two years later he began to sculpt famous people, starting with the Reverend Dr. Anderson. Dexter was completely self-taught and did not seek to study the European or classical Greek styles of his compatriots; for this reason he is considered among the first true American sculptors.

Henry Dexter sculpted over 200 busts in plaster and marble between the years of 1838 and 1875. Some of his most famous sculptures are his portraits of Charles Dickens and President James Buchanan. His depiction of President Buchanan was later used to model his U.S. postage stamp which was part of a series depicting the presidents of the United States.

=== Portrait gallery ===
Henry Dexter was a patriot who hoped to create a gallery of sculptural works depicting the president of the United States and the governors of every US state in the late 1850s on the cusp of the Civil War. He hoped to achieve a unifying official portrait of this period in America's history. This initiative was self-funded at its conception, utilizing his own moneys Dexter traveled some 20,000 miles with all of his tools for modeling and casting. His initial plan was to model each governor in clay and later plaster and with the hope that individual states would then purchase marble renderings post facto for the sum of $500, thus helping him recuperate his costs. This gigantic undertaking began in 1859 as Dexter first traveled to every state in New England having governors of each state sit for him and sending the modeled clay busts back to his workshop in Boston. He then began to work his way along the Mason–Dixon line and finally across the South. He returned to the North to model the recently deceased Governor William Henry Bissell of Illinois before heading to Wisconsin and presumably Minnesota, Michigan and Indiana between the months of April–June 1860. It is likely that Dexter was in Indiana in late April or early May given a letter of introductory correspondence between Michigan Governor Moses Wisner to Governor Willard dated April 25, 1860. (Governor Willard died in October 1860.)

This expedition resulted in thirty one finished busts which were intended to be displayed in the Capitol building in Washington, D.C. However, due to the volatility bred by the recent secession of the Southern states, the totality of the collection was not able to be displayed. By his own admission this endeavor was a failure financially, it left him impoverished for years after his eighteen months of travel across the country. However, historically Dexter's renderings of some of the prominent gubernatorial figures of the United States became a study of many of the most powerful men who were key players in the Civil War. Far from being aware of the long term historical significance of his work Dexter hoped only to accomplish a unifying collection of the nation's administrators.

After his death in Cambridge, Massachusetts on June 23, 1876, the bulk of his collection of governors was donated to the Smithsonian Institution in 1889. Some of the busts remain with private owners or in the collections of some of the states who purchased copies for their own collections.
