= Henry S. Lane =

American politician

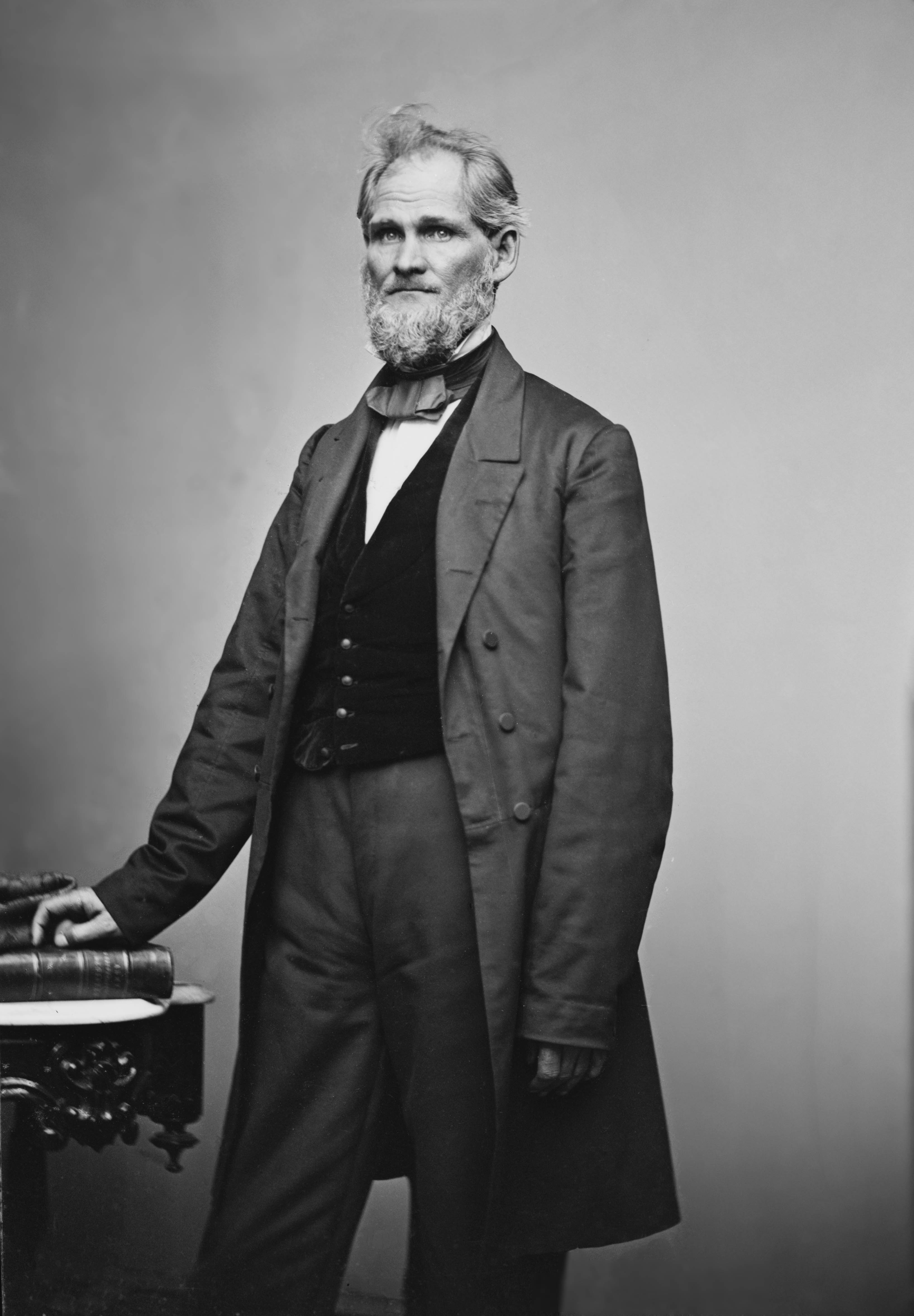

United States Senator from Indiana
- In office March 4, 1861 – March 3, 1867
- Preceded by: Graham N. Fitch
- Succeeded by: Oliver P. Morton

13th Governor of Indiana
- In office January 14, 1861 – January 16, 1861
- Lieutenant: Oliver P. Morton
- Preceded by: Abram A. Hammond
- Succeeded by: Oliver P. Morton

Member of the U. S. House of Representatives from Indiana's 7th district
- In office August 3, 1840 – March 3, 1843
- Preceded by: Tilghman A. Howard
- Succeeded by: Joseph A. Wright

Member of the Indiana House of Representatives
- In office 1838–1839

Member of the Indiana Senate
- In office 1837

Personal details
- Born: February 24, 1811 Sharpsburg, Kentucky, US
- Died: June 19, 1881 (aged 70) Crawfordsville, Indiana, US
- Party: Whig; Know-Nothing Party; Republican
- Spouse(s): Pamela Bledsoe; Joanna Maria Elston

Military service
- Allegiance: United States of America; Union
- Branch/service: United States Army
- Years of service: 1846–1847
- Rank: Lieutenant Colonel
- Commands: First Indiana Regiment Infantry
- Battles/wars: Mexican–American War

Henry Smith Lane (February 24, 1811 – June 19, 1881) was a United States representative and senator and the 13th Governor of Indiana; he was by design the shortest-serving governor of Indiana, having made plans to resign the office should his party take control of the Indiana General Assembly and elect him to the United States Senate. He held that office for only two days, and was known for his opposition to slavery. A Whig until the party collapsed, he supported compromise with the South. He became an early leader in the Republican Party starting in 1856 serving as the president of the first party convention, delivering its keynote address, and was influential in the nomination of Abraham Lincoln. With the repeal of the Missouri Compromise, he became a full-fledged abolitionist, and in the Senate, he was a pro-Union advocate and a strong supporter of the Civil War effort to defeat the Southern Confederacy.

== Early life ==
=== Family and background ===
Henry Smith Lane was born in Bath County, Kentucky near Sharpsburg on February 24, 1811, the son of James H. and Mary Higgins Lane. He received a classical education from private tutors and studied law; he was admitted to the bar in Mount Sterling, Kentucky in 1832. He moved to Crawfordsville, Indiana, in 1835 working at the Bank of Indiana and opening a law office, taking mainly criminal cases.

Lane was an opponent of slavery early in life, and came to support Henry Clay while he lived in Kentucky. At age 20, he delivered an anti-slavery speech to the Colonization Society in October 1831. In the speech, he declared, "The History of all times admonishes us that no man or community of men can be kept forever in slavery." While Lane opposed to expansion of slavery he was not in favor of abolition, but like Henry Clay he believed that over time slavery would die out if it was prevented from spreading. In 1833, he married Pamela Bledsoe Jameson. The couple had no children, and his wife was killed in a stage coach accident 1842; Lane escaped the accident with only minor injuries.

Active in Whig politics, he was a member of the Indiana Senate in 1837 as a representative of Montgomery County and a member of the Indiana House of Representatives in 1838 to 1839. Lane was elected to the U.S. House of Representatives in 1840 to fill the vacancy caused by the resignation of Tilghman A. Howard, he won re-election and defeated John Bryce by an overwhelming majority the next year and served until 1843. He did not seek reelection to a second full term. While in office, he was in favor of compromising with the South over the slavery issue and openly condemned the abolitionist agitators as promoting disunity.

=== Mexican–American War ===
During the 1844 elections, Lane stumped most of Indiana for the Whig presidential candidate, Henry Clay. He married Joanna Maria Elston, a daughter of Isaac Compton Elston, a major investor in the Bank of Indiana in 1845. Lane returned to his law practice after the election and remained there until the outbreak of the Mexican–American War. In May 1846, Lane attended the war meeting held in Indianapolis and became and active member, writing part of the resolutions the meeting issued, pledging troops for the invasion of Mexico.

After the meeting, Lane set out to personally raise a company of men to join the war effort, and he served during the war at its head and rose to the rank of lieutenant colonel of the First Regiment Indiana Infantry. His regiment spent most of the war in Mexicom guarded supply lines and military posts, and saw little action. When his companies' enlistment expired, Lane returned to Indiana by ship, landing in Madison, Indiana. He there confronted many members of the Whigs who opposed the war by publicly decrying their lack of support for the cause. Lane then set out to organize a new company and set out again for Mexico as part of the Fifth Indiana Regiment Infantry and remained in Mexico for the duration of the war.

== Shifting parties ==
After returning from the war, Lane was a candidate for Congress in 1849, challenging Joseph E. McDonald. The election was a close contest, but Lane was ultimately defeated and returned to private life. He abandoned the profession of law and engaged in the banking business at Crawfordsville, Indiana, in 1854. The same year, the Know Nothing Party was established, and Lane joined, along with many other disaffected Whigs. In the legislature, he was a strong supporter of sending a Know-Nothing candidate to the United States Senate. The debate began the start of a period of divisive state politics that would continue until the American Civil War. The Democrats refused to allow the new party any national representation, and Ashbel Willard, who was President of the State Senate, was able to lock up voting and prevent any senator from being elected. The situation exploded, and the Know-Nothings responded by locking up the entire General Assembly.

The results were disastrous, and the Know-Nothings quickly fell apart, but the battle brought Lane national fame in standing up to the Democrats. In 1856, Lane attended the first Republican National Convention. He was elected president of the convention and gained national recognition for his oratory. After the convention, he returned to Indiana and stumped the state for the new party. That year, rge Republicans gained a strong representation in the General Assembly and, with the support of some Democrats, elected Lane and William McCarty to the Senate. The two men went to Washington to challenge the state's sitting senators, but the Senate refused to accept the new senators.

In 1857, the Missouri Compromise was repealed. It had a profound effect on Lane's position on slavery. While he had supported compromise on the issue, the law's repeal led him to become a full-fledged abolitionist and to favor anti-slavery action on the national level.

== Republican ==
=== Gubernatorial campaign ===
Lane returned to Indiana, where he continued to spread the ideas of the new party. In 1860, the state Republican convention chose Lane to run for governor and Oliver Morton as lieutenant governor. It challenged Thomas Hendricks on the Democratic ticket. Prior to the election, it had been negotiated that Lane would be elected to the Senate and Morton would continue as governor. Both men canvassed the entire state.

After a major speech in Evansville, Lane attended the second Republican National Convention and was influential in helping Abraham Lincoln win the presidential nomination. Lane and Lincoln had a friendly relationship, and Lincoln once said of Lane, "Here comes an uglier man than I am."

Returning to Indiana after the convention, he held a final debate with Hendricks in Fort Wayne. Lane was not as skilled a debater as Hendricks but was considered a superior orator. Lane refused to have any more debates with his opponent and instead traveled across the state again giving speeches. The election was close, and Lane defeated Hendricks by about 1,000 votes and was elected governor. He was inaugurated January 14, 1861. However, he served just two days and resigned to accept a seat in the U.S. Senate to honor the agreement with his running mate, Morton, who then became governor.

=== Senator ===
Lane was again elected by the Republican-controlled Indiana Legislature, but again, the Democratic-dominated Senate refused to seat him. As southern states began to secede from the Union, however, the Southern majority quickly gave way and Lane was permitted to be seated. He served from March 4, 1861, to March 3, 1867, and was a supporter of President Lincoln's policies during the Civil War. While in the Senate he was chairman of the Committee on Engrossed Bills (Thirty-seventh through Thirty-ninth Congresses) and a member of the Committee on Pensions (Thirty-ninth Congress).

== Return to private life ==
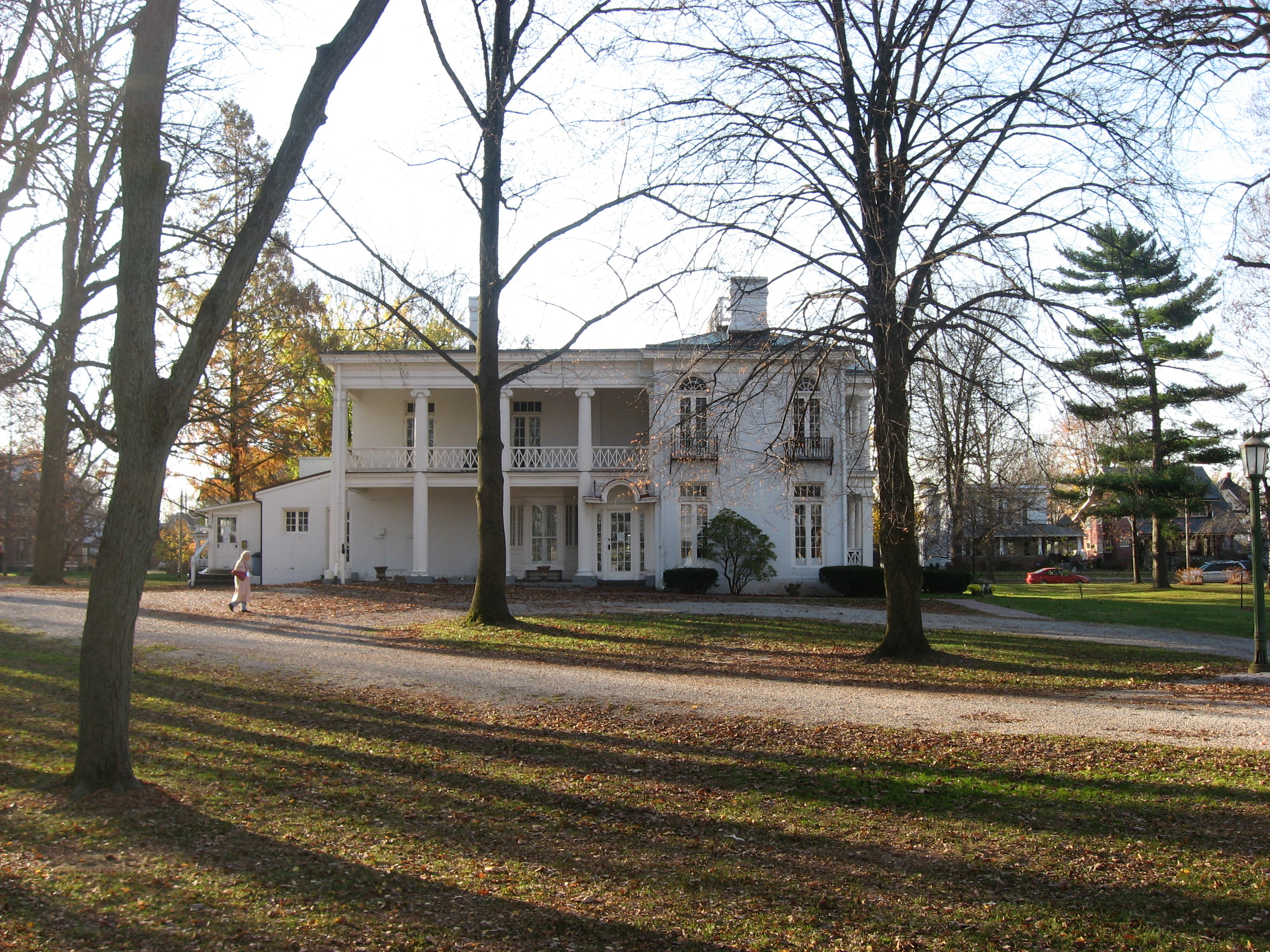
Lane's house in Crawfordsville

After his Senate term ended, Lane returned to Crawfordsville and never again held elected office. He served as special Indian commissioner from 1869 to 1871 and was appointed as commissioner for improvement of the Mississippi River by President Ulysses S. Grant.

On June 18, 1881, Lane entertained some friends at his home in Crawfordsville for the evenings. After the party, he began to have severe chest pains, and he died the next afternoon, June 19, at around 1 p.m. of an apparent heart attack. His death was reported nationally, and biers were held nationwide.

Lane was buried on June 21, his pallbearers being former governors of the state and fellow senators. He was buried in a vault in Oak Hill Cemetery, and that state erected a monument over his grave.

== See also ==
- List of governors of Indiana

== Sources ==
- Dumas Malone (ed.), Dictionary of American Biography, vol. 5, part 2, New York:Charles Scribner's Sons (1961), pp. 574–575.
- Dunn, Jacob Piatt (1919). Indiana and Indianans. American Historical Society.
- Gugin, Linda C.; St. Clair, James E, eds. (2006). The Governors of Indiana. Indianapolis, Indiana: Indiana Historical Society Press. ISBN 0-87195-196-7.
- Indiana Magazine of History. Vol. 12. Indiana Historical Society & Indiana University. 1919.
- Woollen, William Wesley (1975). Biographical and Historical Sketches of Early Indiana. Ayer Publishing. ISBN 0-405-06896-4.

Party political offices
Preceded by Oliver P. Morton	Republican nominee for Governor of Indiana; 1860	Succeeded by Oliver P. Morton
U.S. House of Representatives
Preceded by Tilghman A. Howard	Member of the U.S. House of Representatives from Indiana's 7th congressional district August 3, 1840 – March 4, 1843	Succeeded by Joseph A. Wright
Political offices
Preceded by Abram A. Hammond	Governor of Indiana; January 14, 1861 – January 16, 1861	Succeeded by Oliver P. Morton
U.S. Senate
Preceded by Graham N. Fitch	U.S. senator (Class 3) from Indiana; March 4, 1861 – March 4, 1867; Served alongside: Jesse D. Bright, Joseph A. Wright, David Turpie and Thomas A. Hendricks	Succeeded by Oliver P. Morton
