= Alexander Yates =

American author

- Born: Alexander Elessar Yates; June 1, 1982 (age 44); Port-au-Prince, Haiti
- Education: University of Virginia (BA); Syracuse University (MFA)
- Occupations: Short story writer; novelist

Alexander Elessar Yates (born June 1, 1982, in Port au Prince, Haiti) is an American short story writer, and novelist.

== Life ==
The son of an American diplomat, Yates grew up in the Caribbean and South America, graduating high school in the Philippines. He earned a BA from the University of Virginia in 2004 and an MFA from Syracuse University in 2009. After graduating, Yates took a job at the American Embassy in the Philippines, and has since served with the US Agency for International Development in Rwanda and Afghanistan. He has published one novel for adults, and two for young adults.

His fiction and essays have also appeared in Salon, The Guardian, Recommended Reading, and the Kenyon Review.

He lives in Hanoi, Vietnam.

== Awards ==
Prior to graduating from the MFA program at Syracuse University, Yates won the Joyce Carol Oates award in both fiction and poetry. His first novel, Moondogs, was listed among the best debuts of 2011 by Kirkus Reviews. His second novel, The Winter Place, was a selection of the Junior Library Guild and the Kansas State Reading Circle.

== Works ==
=== Novels ===
- How We Became Wicked (Atheneum Books for Young Readers, 2019)
- The Winter Place (Atheneum Books for Young Readers, 2015)
- Moondogs (Doubleday, 2011)

=== Short fiction ===
- “Valentine”, Recommended Reading
- “Millionaire”, The Kenyon Review
- “I Know them For Their Wounds”, Salon

=== Anthologies ===
- Lincoln Michael and Nadxeli Nieto, eds. (2015). "Gypsee". Gigantic Worlds. Gigantic Books. ISBN 978-0991189601.
