= 1852–53 United States Senate elections =

- Various dates
- Class 2

20 of the 62 seats in the United States Senate (with special elections) 32 seats needed for a majority
	Majority party	Minority party
Party	Democratic	Whig
Last election	33 seats	22 seats
Seats before	37	22
Seats won	10	4
Seats after	35	18
Seat change	▼1	▼4
Seats up	10	9
	Third party	Fourth party
Party	Free Soil	Native American
Last election	2 seats
Seats before	3	New party
Seats won	2	1
Seats after	2	1
Seat change	▼1	▲1
Seats up	1
- Results: Democratic gain Democratic hold Whig gain Whig hold American Gain Legislature failed to elect
Majority party before election
Democratic
Elected Majority party
Democratic

The 1852–53 United States Senate elections were held on various dates in various states, coinciding with the 1852 presidential election. As these U.S. Senate elections were prior to the ratification of the Seventeenth Amendment in 1913, senators were chosen by state legislatures. Senators were elected over a wide range of time throughout 1852 and 1853, and a seat may have been filled months late or remained vacant due to legislative deadlock. In these elections, terms were up for the senators in Class 2.

The Democratic Party gained two seats in the Senate. Only six of the twenty senators up for election were re-elected.

This is the last election until 2026 that no Republicans represented New England in the U.S. Senate.

== Results summary ==
Senate party division, 33rd Congress (1853–1855)

- Majority party: Democratic (35–38)
- Minority party: Whig Party (19–17)
- Other parties: Free Soiler (2–5); American (1)
- Vacant: 5–1
- Total seats: 62

== Change in composition ==
=== Before the elections ===
D_{1}									
D_{2}	D_{3}	D_{4}	D_{5}	D_{6}	D_{7}	D_{8}	D_{9}	D_{10}	D_{11}
D_{21} Ala. (sp); Ran	D_{20} Ala. (reg); Ran	D_{19}	D_{18}	D_{17}	D_{16}	D_{15}	D_{14}	D_{13}	D_{12}
D_{22} Ark. Ran	D_{23} Ga. Unknown	D_{24} Ill. Ran	D_{25} Ind. (sp); Retired	D_{26} Iowa; Ran	D_{27} La. (reg); Unknown	D_{28} La. (sp); Resigned	D_{29} Maine; Retired	D_{30} Mich. Retired	D_{31} Miss. (sp 1); Unknown
Majority →									D_{32} Miss. (sp 2); Miss. (reg); Resigned
FS_{1}	FS_{2}	FS_{3} N.H. Ran	V_{2} Conn. (sp)	V_{1} Calif. (sp)	D_{36} Va. Ran	D_{35} Texas; Ran	D_{34} S.C. (sp); Ran; S.C. (reg); Unknown	D_{33} N.J. (sp); Resigned	D_{32} Miss. (sp 2); Miss. (reg); Resigned
W_{21} Tenn. Ran	W_{20} R.I. Unknown	W_{19} N.C. Ran	W_{18} N.J. (reg); Unknown	W_{17} Mass. Retired	W_{16} Ky. Retired	W_{15} Del. Retired	W_{14}	W_{13}	W_{12}
W_{2}	W_{3}	W_{4}	W_{5}	W_{6}	W_{7}	W_{8}	W_{9}	W_{10}	W_{11}
W_{1}									

=== As a result of the elections ===
D_{1}									
D_{2}	D_{3}	D_{4}	D_{5}	D_{6}	D_{7}	D_{8}	D_{9}	D_{10}	D_{11}
D_{21} Ala. (sp); Elected (Note: Appointee elected)	D_{20} Ala. (reg) D Loss Gain	D_{19}	D_{18}	D_{17}	D_{16}	D_{15}	D_{14}	D_{13}	D_{12}
D_{22} Ark. Re-elected	D_{23} Calif. (sp); Gain	D_{24} Conn. (sp); Gain	D_{25} Ga. Hold	D_{26} Ill. Re-elected	D_{27} Ind. (sp); Hold	D_{28} Iowa; Re-elected	D_{29} La. (sp); Hold	D_{30} Mich. Hold	D_{31} Miss. (sp 1); Hold
Majority →									D_{32} N.H. Gain
V_{2} Miss. (sp 2); Gain Miss. (reg); D Loss	V_{1} Maine; D Loss	A_{1} Ky. Gain	D_{38} Va. Re-elected	D_{37} Texas; Re-elected	D_{36} S.C. (sp); Hold; S.C. (reg); Hold	D_{35} R.I. W Loss Gain	D_{34} N.J. (sp); Hold	D_{33} N.J. (reg); Gain	D_{32} N.H. Gain
V_{3} N.C. W Loss	FS_{2}	FS_{1}	W_{18} Tenn. Re-elected	W_{17} Mass. Hold	W_{16} La. (reg); Gain	W_{15} Del. Hold	W_{14}	W_{13}	W_{12}
W_{2}	W_{3}	W_{4}	W_{5}	W_{6}	W_{7}	W_{8}	W_{9}	W_{10}	W_{11}
W_{1}									

Key:

D_{#}	Democratic
FS_{#}	Free Soil
A_{#}	American
W_{#}	Whig
V_{#}	Vacant

== Race summaries ==
=== Special elections during the 32nd Congress ===
In these elections, the winners were seated during 1852 or in 1853 before March 4; ordered by election date.

State	Incumbent			Results	Candidates
State	Senator	Party	Electoral history	Results	Candidates
California (Class 1)	Vacant			Legislature had previously failed to elect in 1850–1851. New senator elected January 30, 1852 on the eighth ballot. Democratic gain.	▌ ✓ John B. Weller (Democratic) 71 votes; ▌Pierson B. Reading (Whig) 17 votes
Mississippi (Class 2)	Henry S. Foote	Democratic	1846 or 1847	Incumbent resigned January 8, 1852, to become Governor of Mississippi. New senator elected February 18, 1852. Whig gain. Winner then retired at the end of the term; see below.	▌ ✓ Walker Brooke (Whig) [data missing]
Mississippi (Class 1)	John J. McRae	Democratic	1851 (appointed)	Interim appointee replaced by an elected successor. New senator elected March 17, 1852. Democratic hold.	▌ ✓ Stephen Adams (Democratic) [data missing]
Connecticut (Class 1)	Vacant			Legislature failed to elect. New senator elected May 12, 1852. Democratic gain.	▌ ✓ Isaac Toucey (Democratic) [data missing]
South Carolina (Class 2)	William F. De Saussure	Democratic	1852 (appointed)	Interim appointee elected November 29, 1852. Winner was not elected to the next term; see below.	▌ ✓ William F. De Saussure (Democratic) [data missing]
Indiana (Class 3)	Charles W. Cathcart	Democratic	1852 (appointed)	Incumbent retired when elected successor qualified. New senator elected January 18, 1853. Democratic hold.	▌ ✓ John Pettit (Democratic) [data missing]

=== Elections leading to the 33rd Congress ===
In these regular elections, the winners were elected for the term beginning March 4, 1853; ordered by state.

All of the elections involved the Class 2 seats.

State	Incumbent			Results	Candidates
State	Senator	Party	Electoral history	Results	Candidates
Alabama	Jeremiah Clemens	Democratic	1849 (special)	Incumbent retired. Legislature failed to elect. Democratic loss. Seat would remain vacant until November 29, 1853; see below.	[data missing]
Arkansas	William K. Sebastian	Democratic	1848 (appointed); 1848 (special)	Incumbent re-elected in 1853.	▌ ✓ William K. Sebastian (Democratic) [data missing]
Delaware	Presley Spruance	Whig	1846 or 1847	Incumbent retired. New senator elected in 1853. Whig hold.	▌ ✓ John M. Clayton (Whig); Unopposed
Georgia	Robert M. Charlton	Democratic	1852 (appointed)	Unknown if incumbent retired or lost re-election. New senator elected in 1852. Democratic hold.	▌ ✓ Robert Toombs (Democratic) [data missing]
Illinois	Stephen A. Douglas	Democratic	1846	Incumbent re-elected in 1852.	▌ ✓ Stephen A. Douglas (Democratic) 75; ▌Joseph Gillespie (Whig) 19; ▌James H. Collins (Unknown) 1
Iowa	George W. Jones	Democratic	1848	Incumbent re-elected in 1852.	▌ ✓ George W. Jones (Democratic) 59; ▌George G. Wright (Whig) 31; ▌John F. Kinney (Democratic) 1
Kentucky	Joseph R. Underwood	Whig	1846 or 1847	Incumbent retired. New senator had already been elected early in 1851. Know Nothing gain.	▌ ✓ John Burton Thompson (American) 73; ▌Francis P. Stone (Unknown) 65
Louisiana	Solomon W. Downs	Democratic	1847	Incumbent retired or lost re-election. New senator elected in 1852. Whig gain.	▌ ✓ Judah P. Benjamin (Whig) [data missing]
Maine	James W. Bradbury	Democratic	1846	Incumbent retired. Legislature failed to elect. Democratic loss. Seat would remain vacant until 1854.	[data missing]
Massachusetts	John Davis	Whig	1835; 1841 (resigned); 1845 (special); 1847	Incumbent retired. New senator elected in 1853. Whig hold.	▌ ✓ Edward Everett (Whig) [data missing]
Michigan	Alpheus Felch	Democratic	1847	Incumbent retired. New senator elected in 1853. Democratic hold.	▌ ✓ Charles E. Stuart (Democratic) 73.2% (Note: Average vote in both houses); ▌Zachariah Chandler (Whig) 26.1%
Mississippi	Walker Brooke	Whig	1852 (special)	Incumbent retired. Legislature failed to elect. Whig loss. Seat would remain vacant until 1854.	[data missing]
New Hampshire	John P. Hale	Free Soil	1846	Incumbent lost re-election. New senator elected in 1852. Democratic gain.	▌ ✓ Charles G. Atherton (Democratic) 69.3%; ▌Others 30.7%
New Jersey	Jacob W. Miller	Whig	1841; 1846	Unknown if incumbent retired or lost re-election. New senator elected in 1852 or 1853. Democratic gain.	▌ ✓ William Wright (Democratic) 62.3%; ▌Jacob W. Miller (Whig) 37.7%
North Carolina	Willie Mangum	Whig	1830; 1836 (resigned); 1840 (special); 1841	Incumbent lost re-election. Leglislature failed to elect. Whig loss. Seat would remain vacant until 1854.	▌Willie Mangum (Whig) [data missing]
Rhode Island	John Hopkins Clarke	Whig	1846 or 1847	Incumbent retired or lost re-election. Leglislature failed to elect. Whig loss. Seat would remain vacant until July 20, 1853; see below.	[data missing]
South Carolina	William F. De Saussure	Democratic	1852 (appointed); 1852 (special)	Incumbent retired or lost re-election. New senator elected in 1852 or 1853. Democratic hold.	▌ ✓ Josiah J. Evans (Democratic) [data missing]
Tennessee	John Bell	Whig	1847	Incumbent re-elected in 1853.	▌ ✓ John Bell (Whig) 51; ▌Cave Johnson (Democratic) 23; ▌Thomas A. R. Nelson (Whig) 18; ▌Neill S. Brown (Whig) 4; ▌Aaron V. Brown (Democratic) 1
Texas	Sam Houston	Democratic	1846; 1847	Incumbent re-elected in 1853.	▌ ✓ Sam Houston (Democratic) 65; ▌John Hemphill (Democratic) 14; ▌George W. Smyth (Democratic) 1
Virginia	Robert M. T. Hunter	Democratic	1846	Incumbent re-elected in 1852.	▌ ✓ Robert M. T. Hunter (Democratic) 126; Scattering 63

=== Elections during the 33rd Congress ===
In these elections, the winners were elected in 1853 on or after March 4; ordered by date.

State	Incumbent			Results	Candidates
State	Senator	Party	Electoral history	Results	Candidates
New Jersey (Class 1)	Robert F. Stockton	Democratic	1851	Incumbent resigned January 10, 1853, to become president of the Delaware and Raritan Canal Company. New senator elected March 4, 1853. Democratic hold.	▌ ✓ John Renshaw Thomson (Democratic) 64.4%; ▌William L. Dayton (Whig) 35.6%
Rhode Island (Class 2)	Vacant			Legislature had failed to elect. New senator elected July 20, 1853. Democratic gain.	▌ ✓ Philip Allen (Democratic) [data missing]
Alabama (Class 2)	Vacant			Legislature had failed to elect. New senator elected November 29, 1853. Democratic gain.	▌ ✓ Clement Claiborne Clay (Democratic) 85; ▌R. W. Walker (Unknown) 37; ▌Jeremiah Clemens (Democratic) 8
Louisiana (Class 3)	Pierre Soulé	Democratic	1847 (special); 1847 (left office); 1848	Incumbent resigned to become U.S. Minister to Spain. New senator elected December 5, 1853. Democratic hold.	▌ ✓ John Slidell (Democratic) 70; ▌T. G. Hunt (Unknown) 37
Alabama (Class 3)	Benjamin Fitzpatrick	Democratic	1848 (appointed); 1849 (elected successor qualified); 1853 (appointed)	Interim appointee elected December 12, 1853.	▌ ✓ Benjamin Fitzpatrick (Democratic) 107; ▌William D. Dunn (Unknown) 14; ▌Jeremiah Clemens (Democratic) 2; ▌Francis Strother Lyon (Democratic) 1

== Alabama ==
=== Alabama (regular) ===
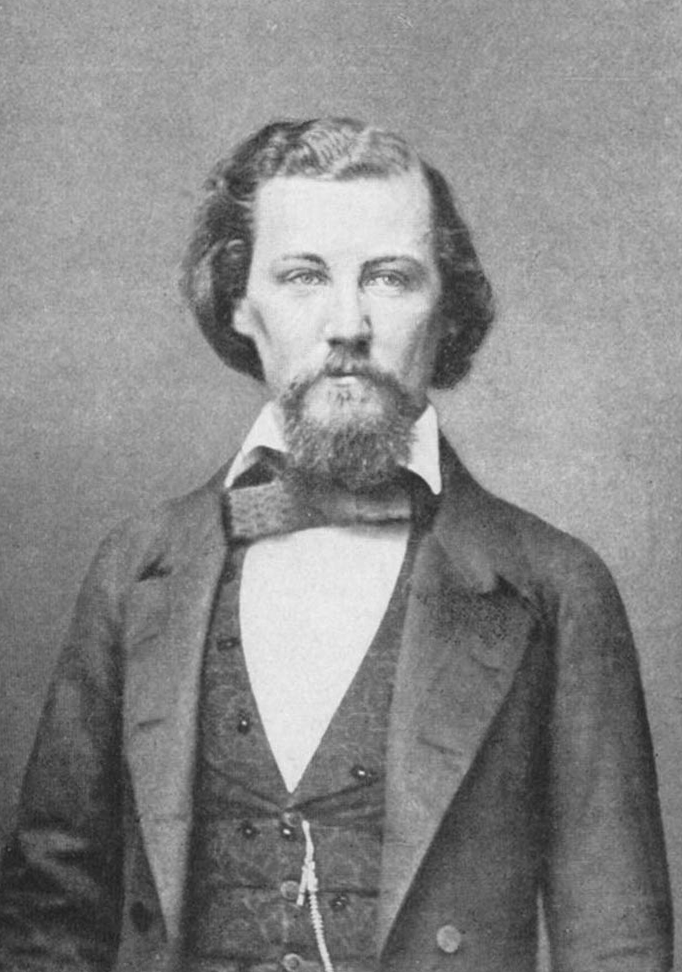
Senator Clement Claiborne Clay

The legislature had failed to elect a senator for the other seat, previously held by Democrat Jeremiah Clemens. On November 28, 1853, Democrat Clement Claiborne Clay was elected late to the seat.

- ✓ Clement Claiborne Clay 85 votes
- R. W. Walker 37 votes
- Jeremiah Clemens 8 votes

=== Alabama (special, class 3) ===
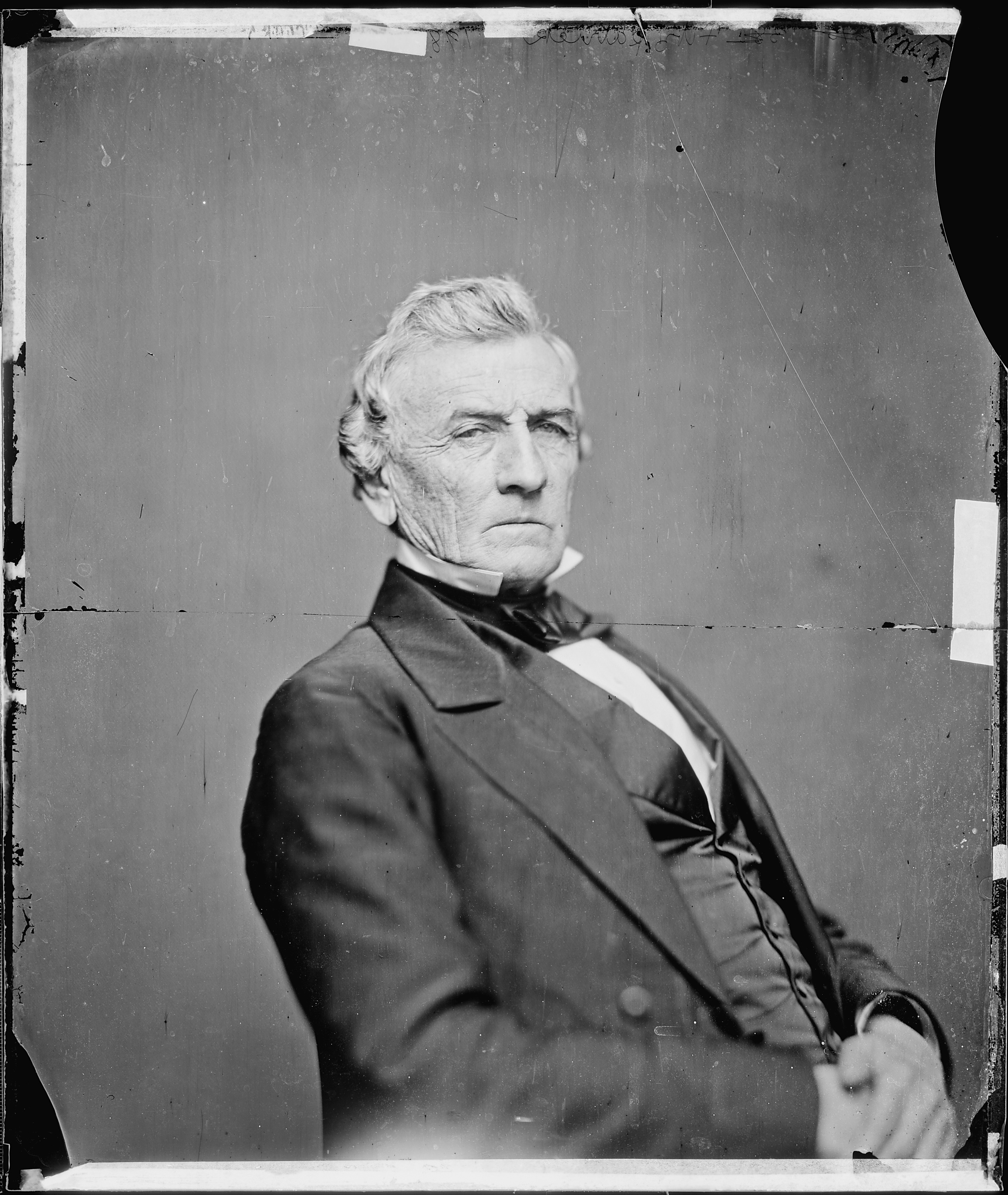
Senator Benjamin Fitzpatrick

On December 20, 1852, Democrat William R. King resigned due to poor health. On January 14, 1853, Democrat Benjamin Fitzpatrick was appointed to continue the term, and he was elected November 28, 1853, to finish the term.

- ✓ Benjamin Fitzpatrick 107 votes
- William D. Dunn 14 votes
- Jeremiah Clemens 2 votes
- Francis Strother Lyon 1 vote

== Arkansas ==
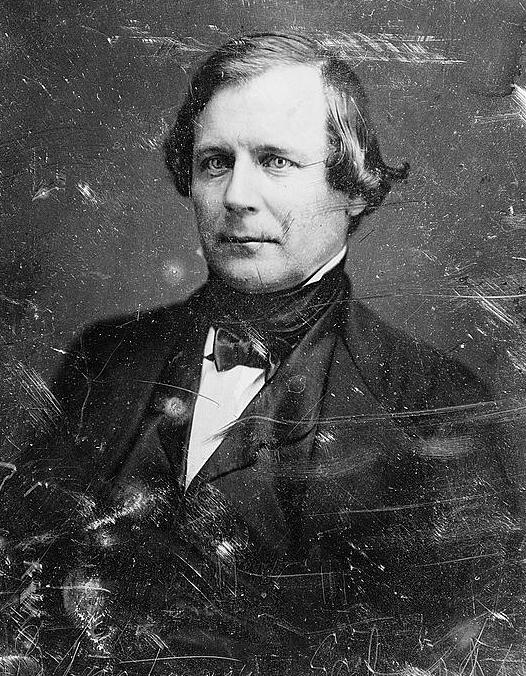
Senator William K. Sebastian

Democratic senator William K. Sebastian had been appointed May 12, 1848, to continue the term, to which he was elected later that year to finish.

Sebastian was re-elected to a full term in 1853.

== California (special) ==
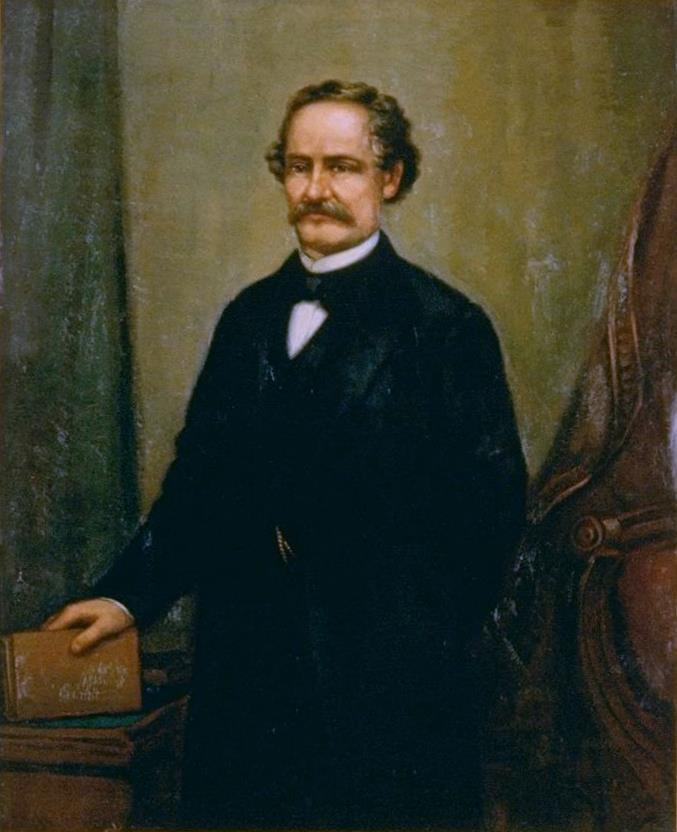
Senator John B. Weller

The California legislature had failed to elect a successor to Democrat John C. Frémont in time for the 1851 beginning of the class 1 term.

In fact, this time it took eight ballots for Democrat John B. Weller (71 votes, 80.7%) to be elected January 30, 1852, over Whig Pierson B. Reading (17 votes, 19.3%).

== Connecticut (special) ==
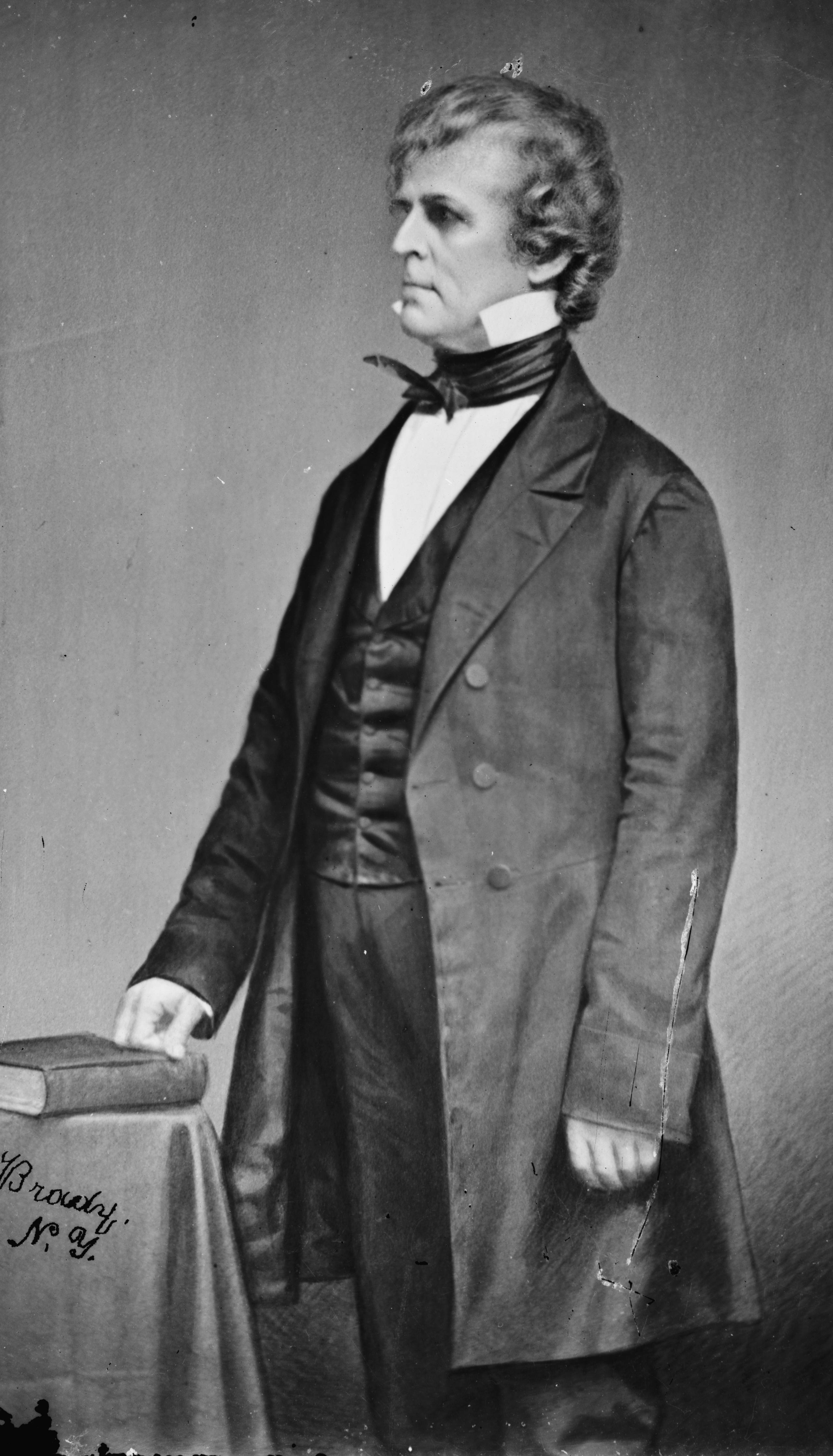
Senator Isaac Toucey

The Connecticut legislature had failed to elect a senator for the term beginning in 1851. Democrat Isaac Toucey was elected in May 1852 to finish the term.

Senate (May 11, 1852)	House (May 12, 1852)
✓ Isaac Toucey 13; Roger Baldwin 6; Francis Gillette 1	✓ Isaac Toucey 124; Roger Baldwin 84; Francis Gillette 6; Samuel Ingham 3; S. H. Beardsley 1

== Delaware ==
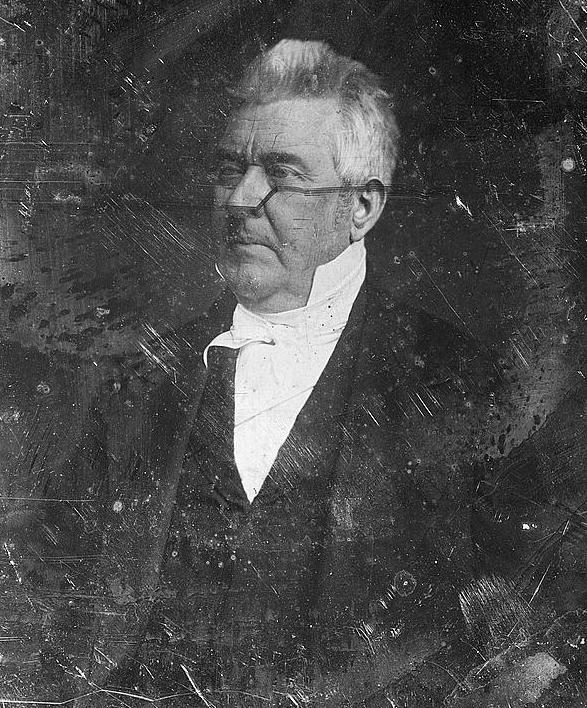
Senator John M. Clayton

First-term Whig Presley Spruance retired and Whig former senator John M. Clayton was elected January 12, 1853.

Clayton received 17 votes and there were 13 blank ballots cast.

== Georgia ==
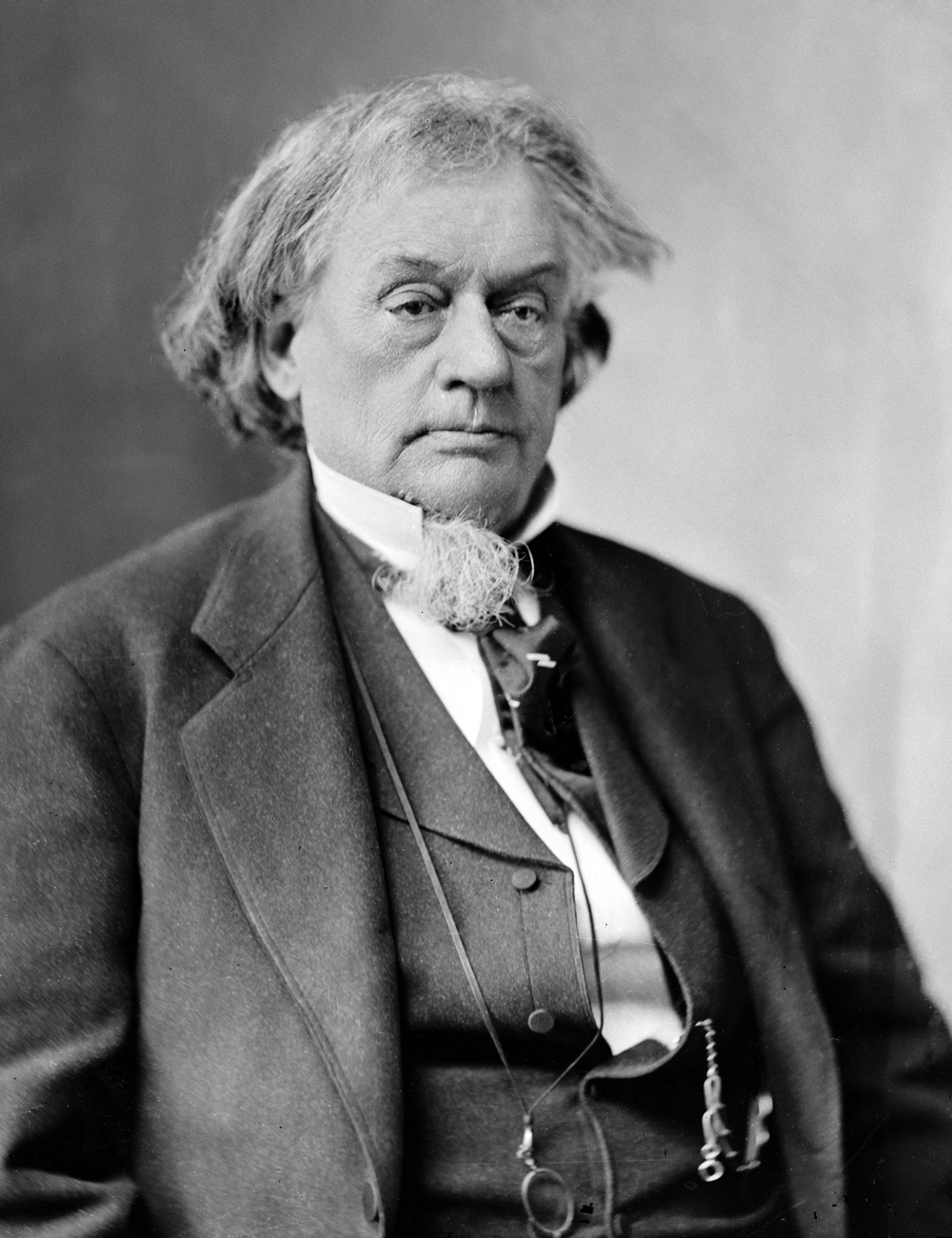
Senator Robert Toombs

Second-term Whig John M. Berrien resigned May 28, 1852, and Democrat Robert M. Charlton was appointed May 31, 1852, to finish the term.

Democrat Robert Toombs was elected in 1852 and would serve through re-election in 1858 and until he withdrew in 1861.

== Illinois ==
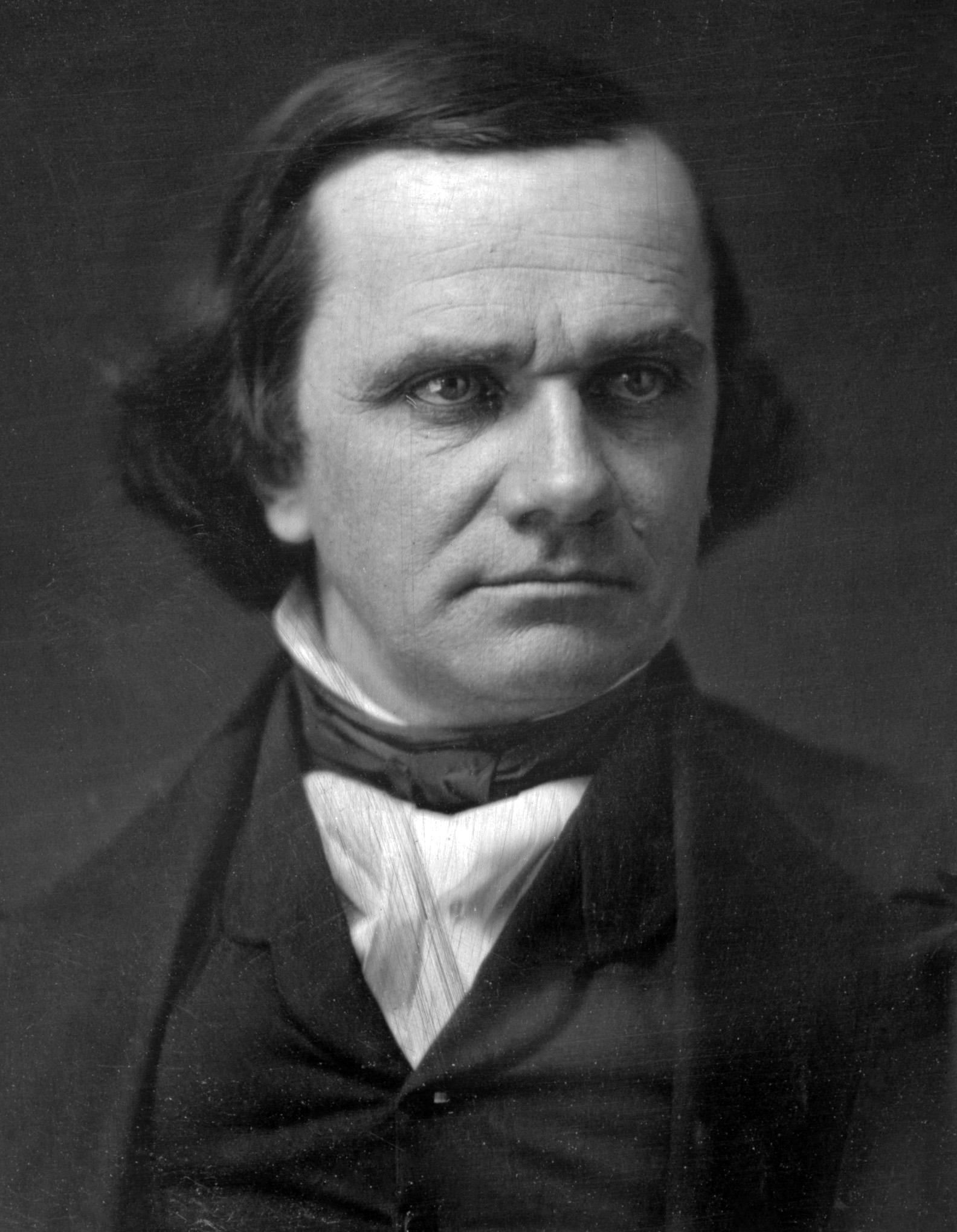
Senator Stephen A. Douglas

Two-term Democrat Stephen A. Douglas was re-elected January 5, 1853. He would be re-elected in 1859 and serve until his 1861 death.

- ✓ Stephen A. Douglas (Democratic) 75 votes
- State senator Joseph Gillespie (Whig) 19 votes
- James H. Collins 1 vote

== Indiana (special) ==
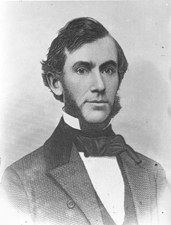
Senator John Pettit

First term Democrat James Whitcomb died December 4, 1852, and Democrat Charles W. Cathcart was appointed December 6, 1852, pending a special election to finish the term that would end in 1855.

Democrat John Pettit won the January 18, 1853, election.

== Iowa ==
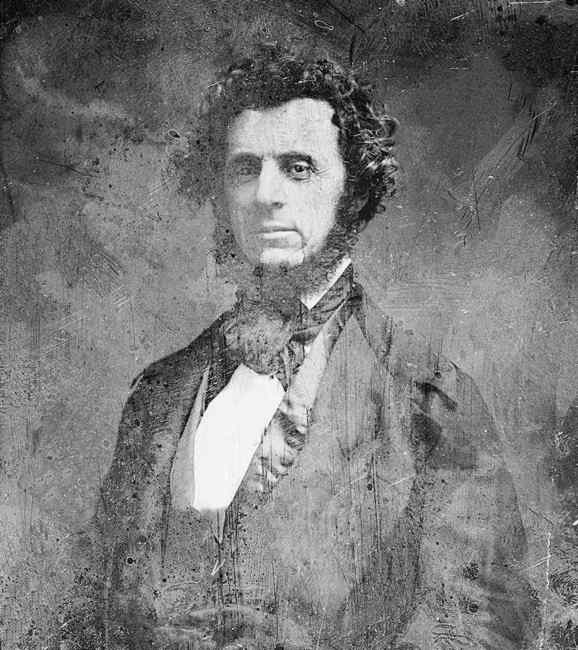
Senator George Wallace Jones

First-term Democrat George Wallace Jones was re-elected to a second term.

He received the Democratic nomination on December 20, 1852, by the narrowest of margins: 30 to 29 votes. The general election was held the next day, December 21, in which Jones easily won.

- ✓ George Wallace Jones (Democratic) 59 votes
- George G. Wright (Whig) 31 votes
- John F. Kinney (Democratic) 1 vote

== Kentucky ==
One-term Whig Joseph R. Underwood retired from the class 2 seat and the American Party Lieutenant Governor of Kentucky John Burton Thompson had already been elected early, December 13, 1851, far in advance of the 1853 term.

== Louisiana ==
=== Louisiana (regular) ===
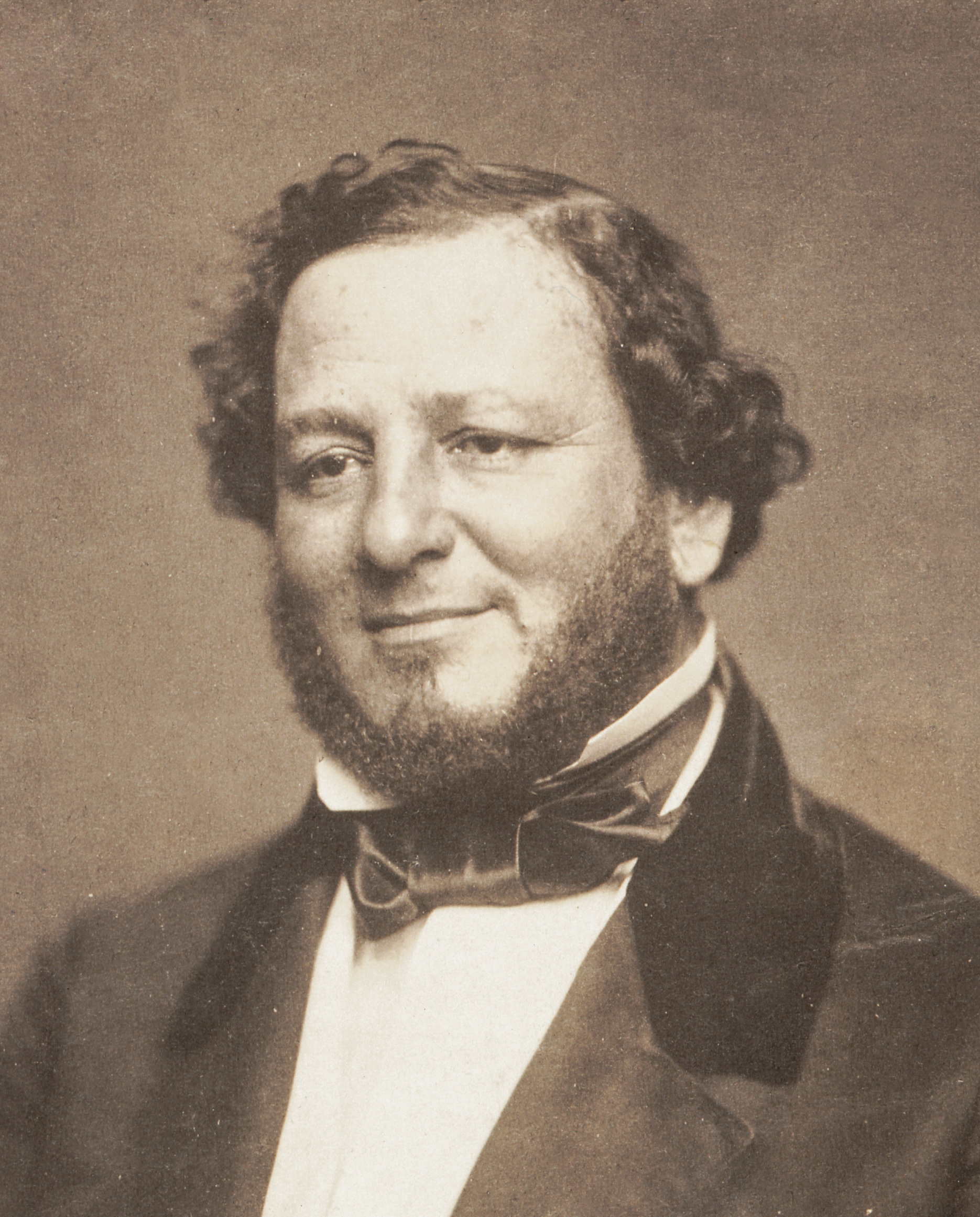
Senator Judah P. Benjamin

Democrat Solomon W. Downs lost re-election to Whig businessman Judah P. Benjamin in January 1852. Some Whig newspapers thought Benjamin too young and inexperienced at forty, despite his undoubted talent, but the Whig legislative caucus selected him on the second ballot, and he was elected by the legislature.

=== Louisiana (special) ===
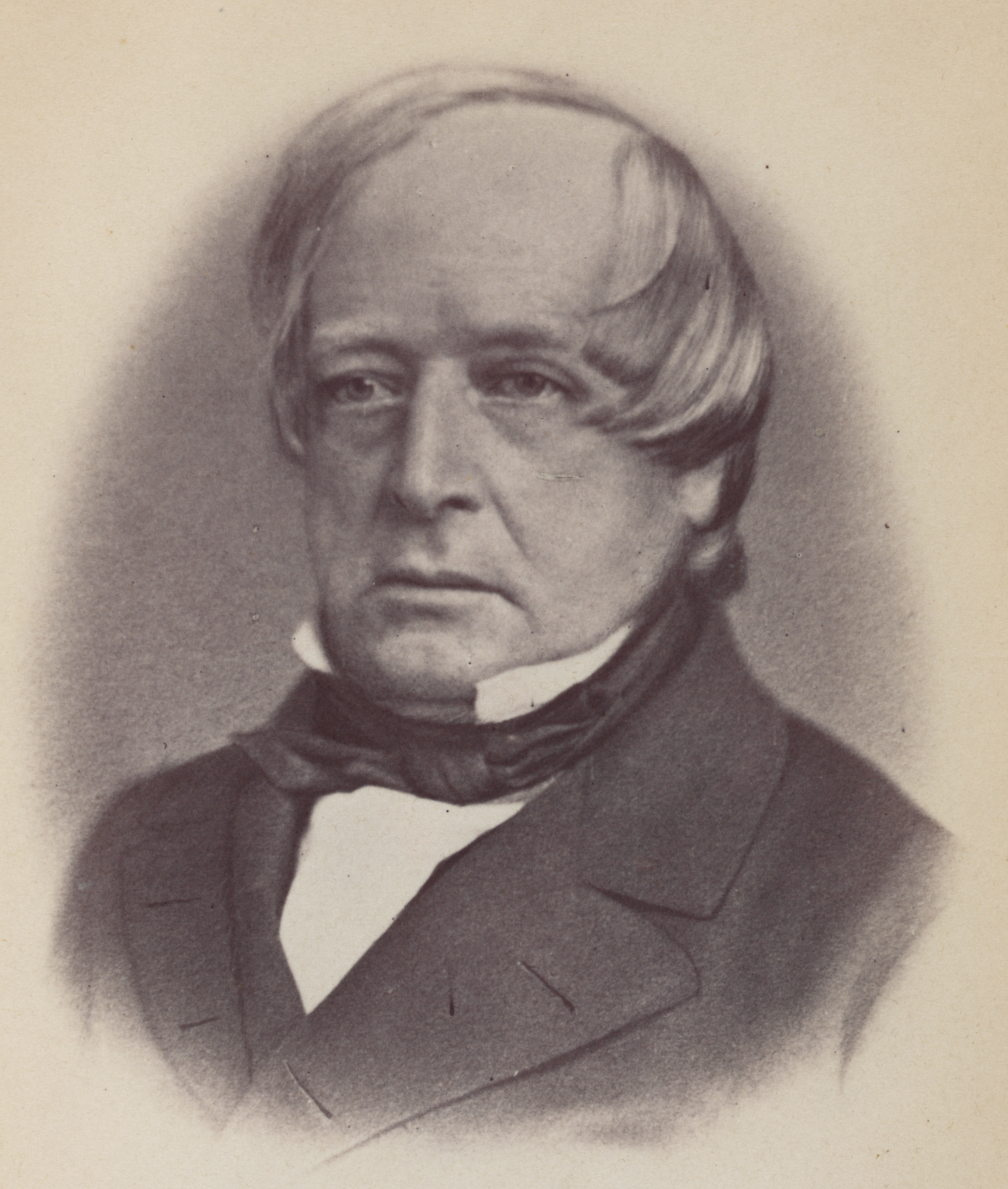
Senator John Slidell

First-term Democrat Pierre Soulé was appointed U.S. Minister to Spain and resigned April 11, 1853.

Former-Democratic congressman and diplomat John Slidell was elected April 28, 1853.

- ✓ John Slidell (Democratic) 70 votes
- T.G. Hunt 37 votes

Slidell would be re-elected in 1858 and serve until he withdrew in 1861.

== Maine ==
First-term Democrat James W. Bradbury retired and the Maine legislature failed to elect his replacement until long after the new Congress began. It wasn't until 1854 that a new senator would be elected.

== Massachusetts ==
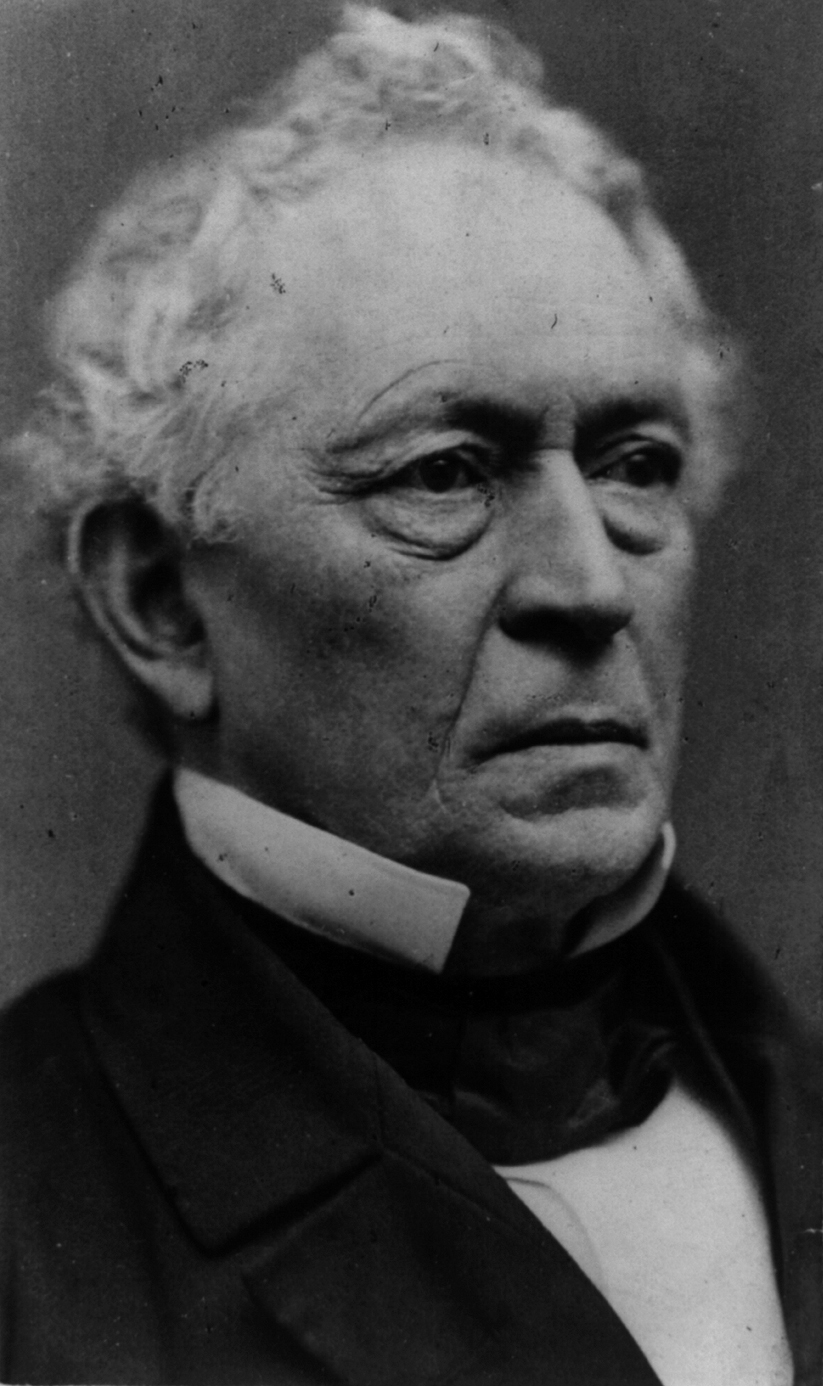
Senator Edward Everett

Long-time senator Whig John Davis retired. Whig U.S. Secretary of State and former Governor of Massachusetts Edward Everett was elected in 1853.

Everett would resign just one year into his term due to his distaste dealing with the politics of slavery and abolition.

== Michigan ==
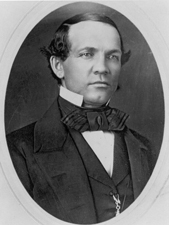
Senator Charles E. Stuart

First-term Democrat Alpheus Felch retired. Fellow Democratic congressman Charles E. Stuart was elected January 11, 1853, over Whig Mayor of Detroit Zachariah Chandler.

Vote for U.S. senator in the Michigan House of Representatives
Party	Candidate	Votes	%
Democratic	Charles E. Stuart	49	69.0
Whig	Zachariah Chandler	21	29.6
Unknown	Hovey K. Clarke	1	1.4

Vote for U.S. senator in the Michigan Senate
Party	Candidate	Votes	%
Democratic	Charles E. Stuart	24	77.4
Whig	Zachariah Chandler	7	22.6

Stuart only served one term, retiring in 1859. Chandler, meanwhile, would be elected to the other seat and serve for three terms.

== Mississippi ==
=== Mississippi (special, class 1) ===
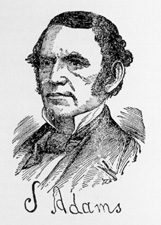
Senator Stephen Adams

Incumbent Democrat Jefferson Davis resigned in 1851 to run for Governor of Mississippi. Democrat John J. McRae was appointed December 1, 1851, to continue Davis's term, pending a special election. Democrat Stephen Adams won the March 17, 1852, special election to finish the term that would continue until 1857.

=== Mississippi (special, class 2) ===
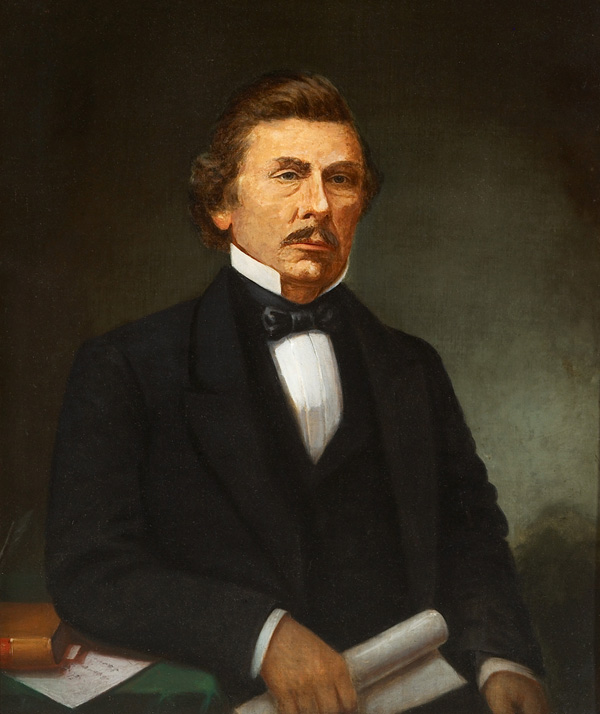
Senator Walker Brooke

Incumbent Democrat Henry S. Foote resigned January 8, 1852, to become Governor of Mississippi. Whig Walker Brooke was elected February 18, 1852, to finish the term that would end the following year.

=== Mississippi (regular) ===
Brooke was not a candidate to the next term.

The Mississippi legislature failed to elect a replacement for Brooke, and the seat remained vacant until early 1854.

== New Hampshire ==
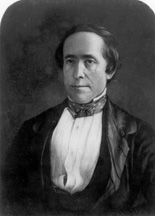
Senator Charles G. Atherton

Free Soil senator John P. Hale ran for U.S. President, coming in third place in the popular vote, but failing to win any states. He lost to the Democratic fellow-New Hampshire senator Franklin Pierce. He then lost re-election to his senate seat when Democrats took over the New Hampshire legislature in 1852 state elections.

Democratic former-senator Charles G. Atherton was returned to the Senate in Hale's place on November 25, 1852.

Vote for U.S. senator in the New Hampshire House of Representatives
Party	Candidate	Votes	%
Democratic	Charles G. Atherton	148	55.2
Unknown	Ira Perley	81	30.2
Unknown	John Preston	27	10.1
Democratic	State senator John S. Wells	4	1.5
Free Soil	John P. Hale (Incumbent)	4	1.5
Whig	Ichabod Goodwin	1	0.4
Unknown	Moses A. Cartland	1	0.4
Unknown	Joseph E. Bennett	1	0.4
Democratic	Charles H. Peaslee	1	0.4

Vote for U.S. senator in the New Hampshire Senate
Party	Candidate	Votes	%
Democratic	Charles G. Atherton	10	83.3
Unknown	Ira Perley	1	8.3
Unknown	John Preston	1	8.3

Atherton died from pulmonary tuberculosis in the first year of his term.

After Republicans retook the New Hampshire legislature in 1854, Hale was re-elected to finish the term.

== New Jersey ==
=== New Jersey (regular) ===
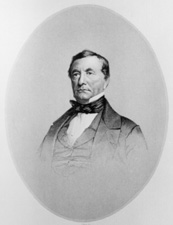
Senator William Wright

Two-term Whig Jacob W. Miller lost re-election to Democratic former-Congressman William Wright.

Vote for U.S. senator in joint session of the New Jersey legislature
Party	Candidate	Votes	%
Democratic	William Wright	48	62.3
Whig	Jacob W. Miller (Incumbent)	29	37.7

Wright would lose re-election in 1859 but be returned to the Senate in 1863.

=== New Jersey (special) ===
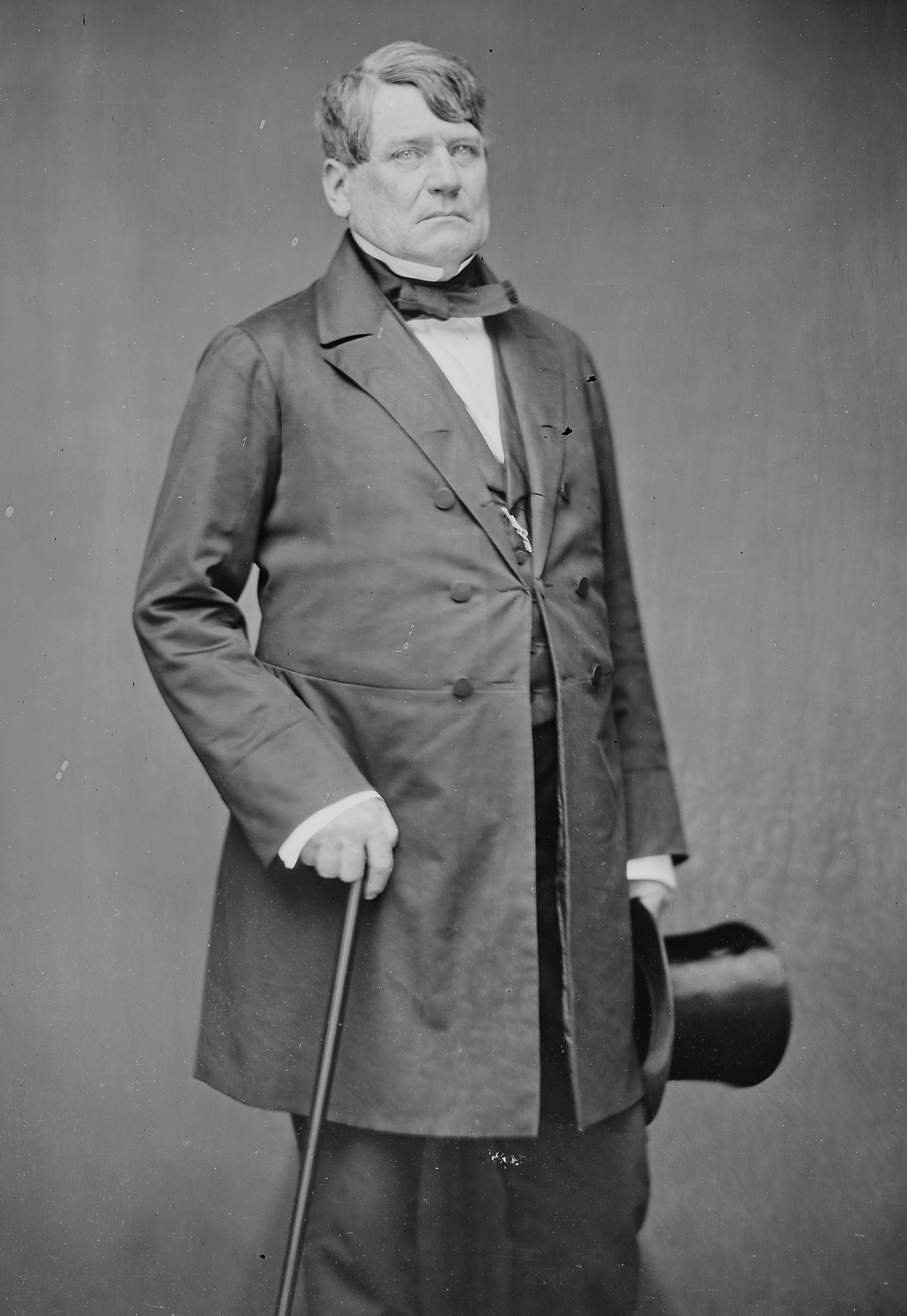
Senator John Renshaw Thomson

First-term Democrat Robert F. Stockton resigned from the Class 1 seat January 10, 1853, to become President of the Delaware and Raritan Canal Company.

Democrat John Renshaw Thomson was elected February 11, 1853, over Whig former-senator William L. Dayton to finish the term.

Vote for U.S. senator in joint session of the New Jersey legislature
Party	Candidate	Votes	%
Democratic	John Renshaw Thomson	47	64.4
Whig	William L. Dayton	26	35.6

Thomson would be re-elected in 1857 to a full term and serve until his death in 1862.

== North Carolina ==
Long-time Whig Willie Mangum was a candidate for re-election. Although Democratic former-congressman James C. Dobbin was a top choice of the North Carolina Legislature, no candidate received a majority of votes in either house, so the seat was left unfilled.

The seat would remain vacant until a 1854 special election.

Dobbin would then be appointed U.S. Secretary of the Navy and Magnum retired from public service.

== Rhode Island ==
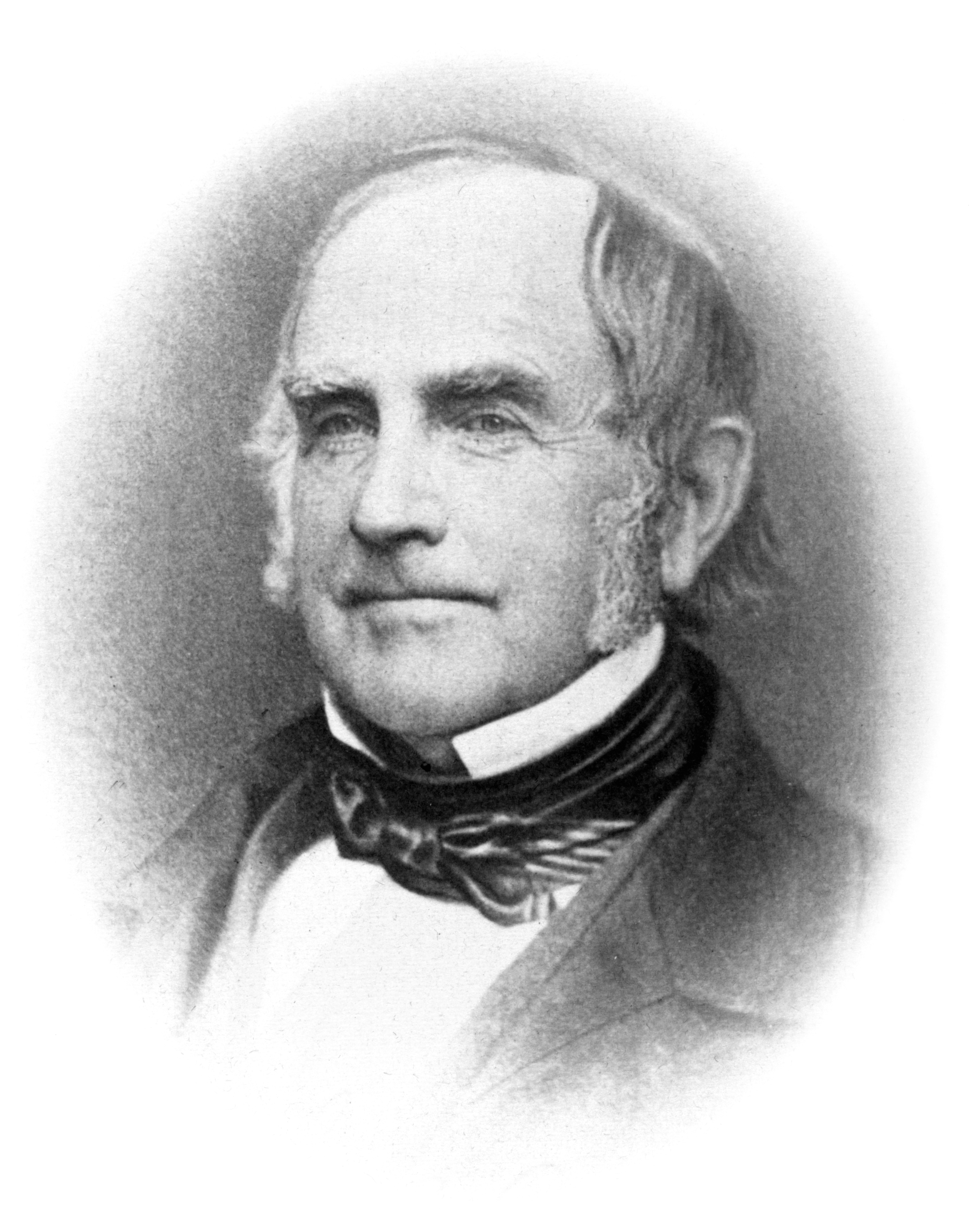
Senator Philip Allen

The Rhode Island General Assembly failed to elect, so first-term Whig John Hopkins Clarke thereby lost re-election.

After the term began, Democrat Philip Allen was elected July 20, 1853, to fill the seat. Allen would serve only one term, retiring in 1859.

== South Carolina ==
Democrat Robert Rhett resigned May 7, 1852, and Democratic judge of the chancery court William F. De Saussure was appointed May 10, 1852, to continue the term, pending a special election. The term would end in March 1853, so there was an election to finish the term and an election to the next term.

=== South Carolina (special) ===
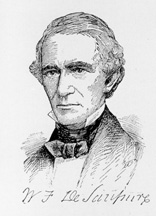
Senator William F. De Saussure

De Saussure was elected November 29, 1852, just to finish the term.

=== South Carolina (regular) ===
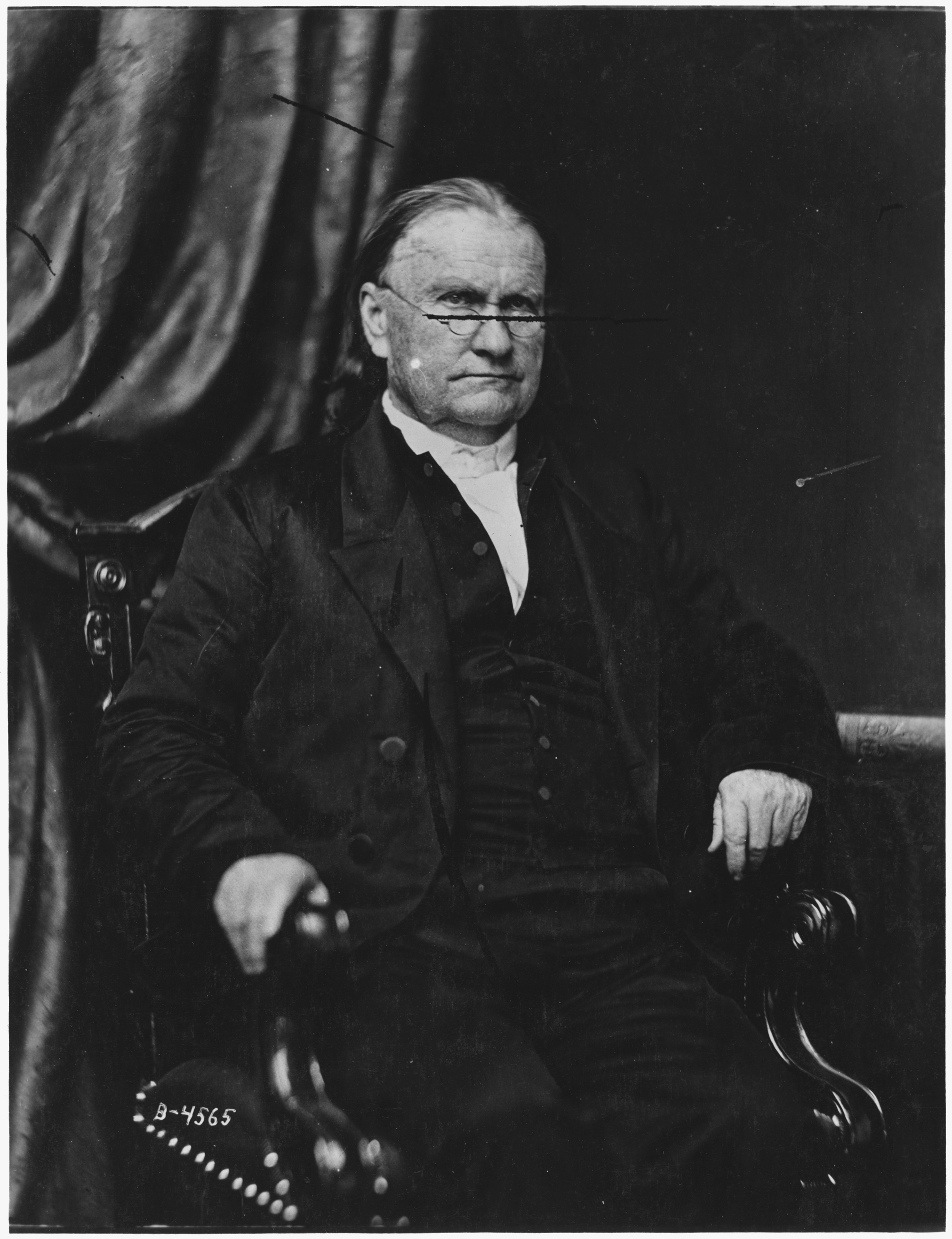
Senator Josiah J. Evans

Democrat Josiah J. Evans was elected December 1, 1852, on the fourth ballot to the next term.

== Tennessee ==
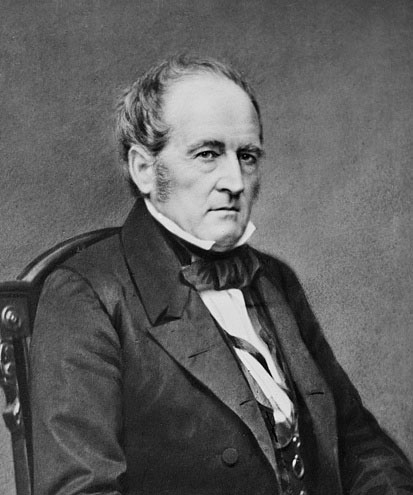
John Bell

First-term Whig John Bell was re-elected October 29, 1853, on the 49th ballot.

- ✓ John Bell (Whig) 51 votes
- Thomas A.R. Nelson 18 votes
- Cave Johnson 23 votes
- Neill S. Brown 4 votes
- Aaron V. Brown 1 vote

Bell would fall out of favor with the Tennessee legislature over the sectionalism that was rife in the late 1850s and lost their vote for re-election.

== Texas ==
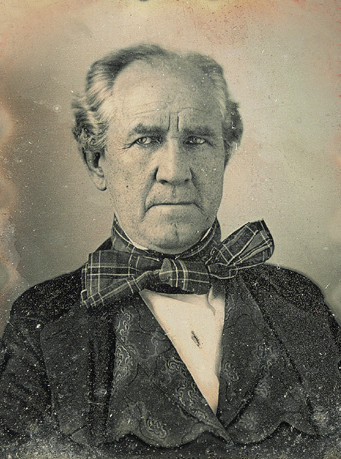
Senator Sam Houston

Two-term Democrat Sam Houston — a Texas founder who had served as senator since statehood — was re-elected January 15, 1853.

- ✓ Sam Houston (Democratic) 65 votes
- John Hemphill 14 votes
- George W. Smyth 1 vote

Houston would retire at the end of this term in 1859, and be replaced by John Hemphill.

== Virginia ==
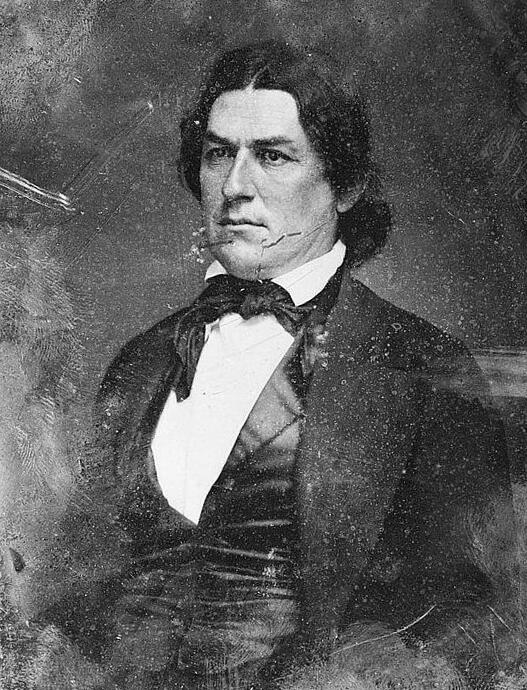
Senator Robert M. T. Hunter

First-term Democrat Robert M. T. Hunter was re-elected January 22, 1852.

- ✓ Robert M. T. Hunter (Democratic) 126 votes
- Scattering 63 votes

Hunter would be re-elected again in 1858 and serve until his 1861 expulsion.

== See also ==
- 1852 United States elections
  - 1852 United States presidential election
  - 1852–53 United States House of Representatives elections
- 32nd United States Congress
- 33rd United States Congress
