= 1841 in the United States =

- Decades: 1820s; 1830s; 1840s; 1850s; 1860s
- See also: History of the United States (1789–1849); Timeline of United States history (1820–1859); List of years in the United States

Events from the year 1841 in the United States. It was the first calendar year to have three different presidents, which would only occur again in 1881.

== Incumbents ==
=== Federal government ===
- President:

Martin Van Buren (D-New York) (until March 4)
William Henry Harrison (W-Ohio) (March 4 – April 4)
John Tyler (W/I-Virginia) (starting April 4)

- Vice President:

Richard M. Johnson (D-Kentucky) (until March 4)
John Tyler (W-Virginia) (March 4 – April 4)
vacant (starting April 4)

- Chief Justice: Roger B. Taney (Maryland)
- Speaker of the House of Representatives:

Robert Mercer Taliaferro Hunter (W-Virginia) (until March 4)
John White (W-Kentucky) (starting May 31)

- Congress: 26th (until March 4), 27th (starting March 4)

==== State governments ====
Governors and lieutenant governors

=== Governors ===
- Governor of Alabama: Arthur P. Bagby (Democratic) (until November 22), Benjamin Fitzpatrick (Democratic) (starting November 22)
- Governor of Arkansas: Archibald Yell (Democratic)
- Governor of Connecticut: William W. Ellsworth (Whig)
- Governor of Delaware: Cornelius P. Comegys (Whig) (until January 19), William B. Cooper (Whig) (starting January 19)
- Governor of Georgia: Charles J. McDonald (Democratic)
- Governor of Illinois: Thomas Carlin (Democratic)
- Governor of Indiana: Samuel Bigger (Whig)
- Governor of Kentucky: Robert P. Letcher (Whig)
- Governor of Louisiana: André B. Roman (Whig)
- Governor of Maine:
  - until January 12: John Fairfield (Democratic)
  - January 12-13: Richard H. Vose (Whig)
  - starting January 13: Edward Kent (Whig)
- Governor of Maryland: William Grason (Democratic)
- Governor of Massachusetts: Marcus Morton (Democratic) (until January 7), John Davis (Whig) (starting January 7)
- Governor of Michigan: William Woodbridge (Whig) (until February 23), James Wright Gordon (Whig) (starting February 23)
- Governor of Mississippi: Alexander G. McNutt (Democratic)
- Governor of Missouri: Thomas Reynolds (Democratic)
- Governor of New Hampshire: John Page (Democratic)
- Governor of New Jersey: William Pennington (Whig)
- Governor of New York: William H. Seward (Whig)
- Governor of North Carolina: Edward Bishop Dudley (Whig) (until January 1), John Motley Morehead (Whig) (starting January 1)
- Governor of Ohio: Thomas Corwin (Whig)
- Governor of Pennsylvania: David R. Porter (Democratic)
- Governor of Rhode Island: Samuel Ward King (Rhode Island)
- Governor of South Carolina: John Peter Richardson II (Democratic)
- Governor of Tennessee: James K. Polk (Democratic) (until October 15), James C. Jones (Whig) (starting October 15)
- Governor of Vermont: Silas H. Jennison (Whig) (until October 15), Charles Paine (Whig) (starting October 15)
- Governor of Virginia:
  - until March 20: Thomas Walker Gilmer (Whig)
  - March 20-31: John M. Patton (Whig)
  - starting March 31: John Rutherfoord (Whig)

=== Lieutenant governors ===
- Lieutenant Governor of Connecticut: Charles Hawley (Whig)
- Lieutenant Governor of Illinois: Stinson Anderson (Democratic)
- Lieutenant Governor of Indiana: Samuel Hall (Whig)
- Lieutenant Governor of Kentucky: Manlius Valerius Thomson (political party unknown)
- Lieutenant Governor of Massachusetts: George Hull (political party unknown)
- Lieutenant Governor of Michigan: James Wright Gordon (Whig)
- Lieutenant Governor of Missouri: Meredith Miles Marmaduke (Democratic)
- Lieutenant Governor of New York: Luther Bradish (Whig)
- Lieutenant Governor of Rhode Island: Byron Diman (political party unknown)
- Lieutenant Governor of South Carolina: William K. Clowney (Democratic)
- Lieutenant Governor of Vermont: David M. Camp (Whig) (until October 15), Waitstill R. Ranney (Whig) (starting October 15)

== Events ==
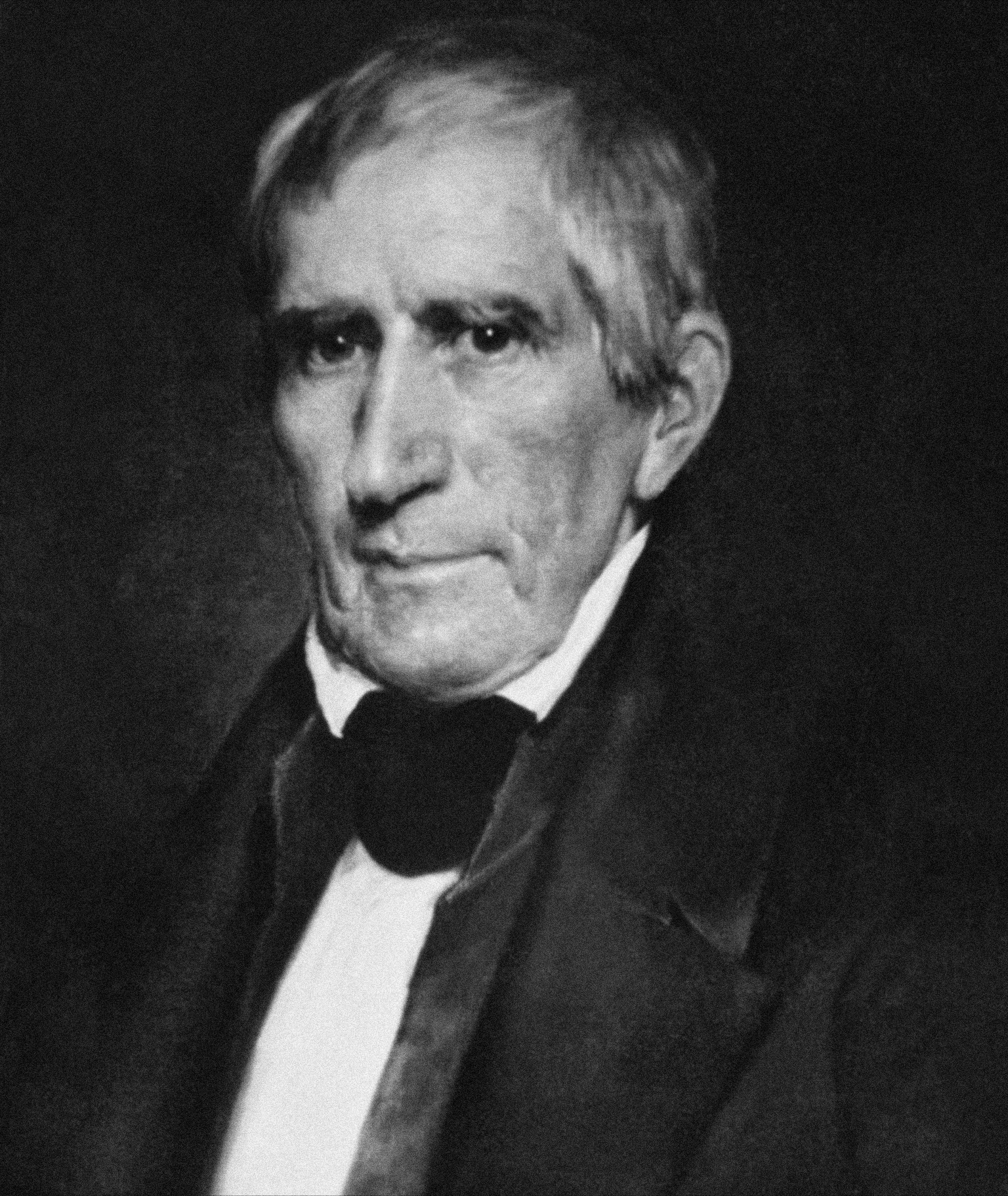
March 4: William Henry Harrison becomes the ninth U.S. president

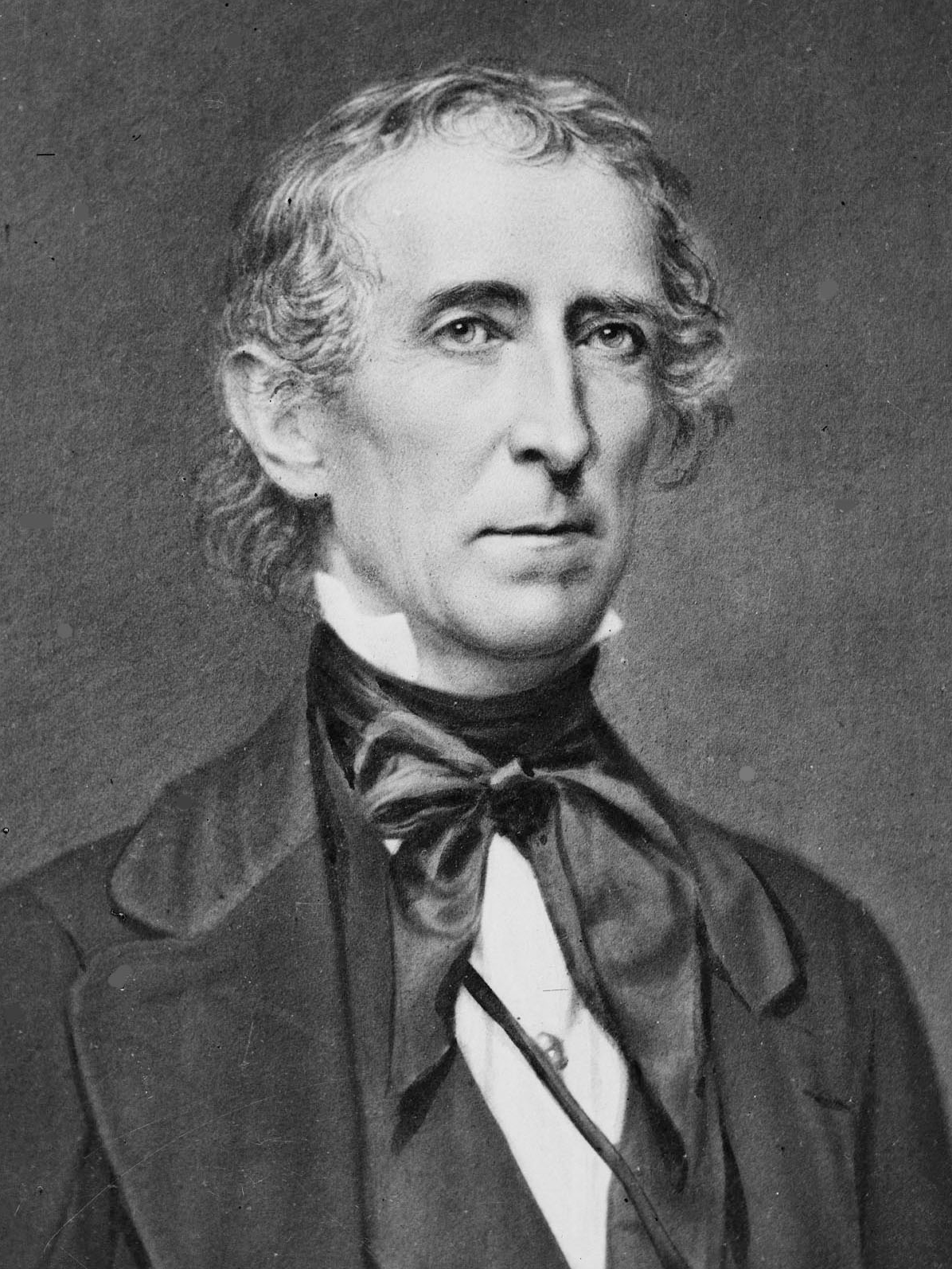
John Tyler becomes the tenth U.S. vice president

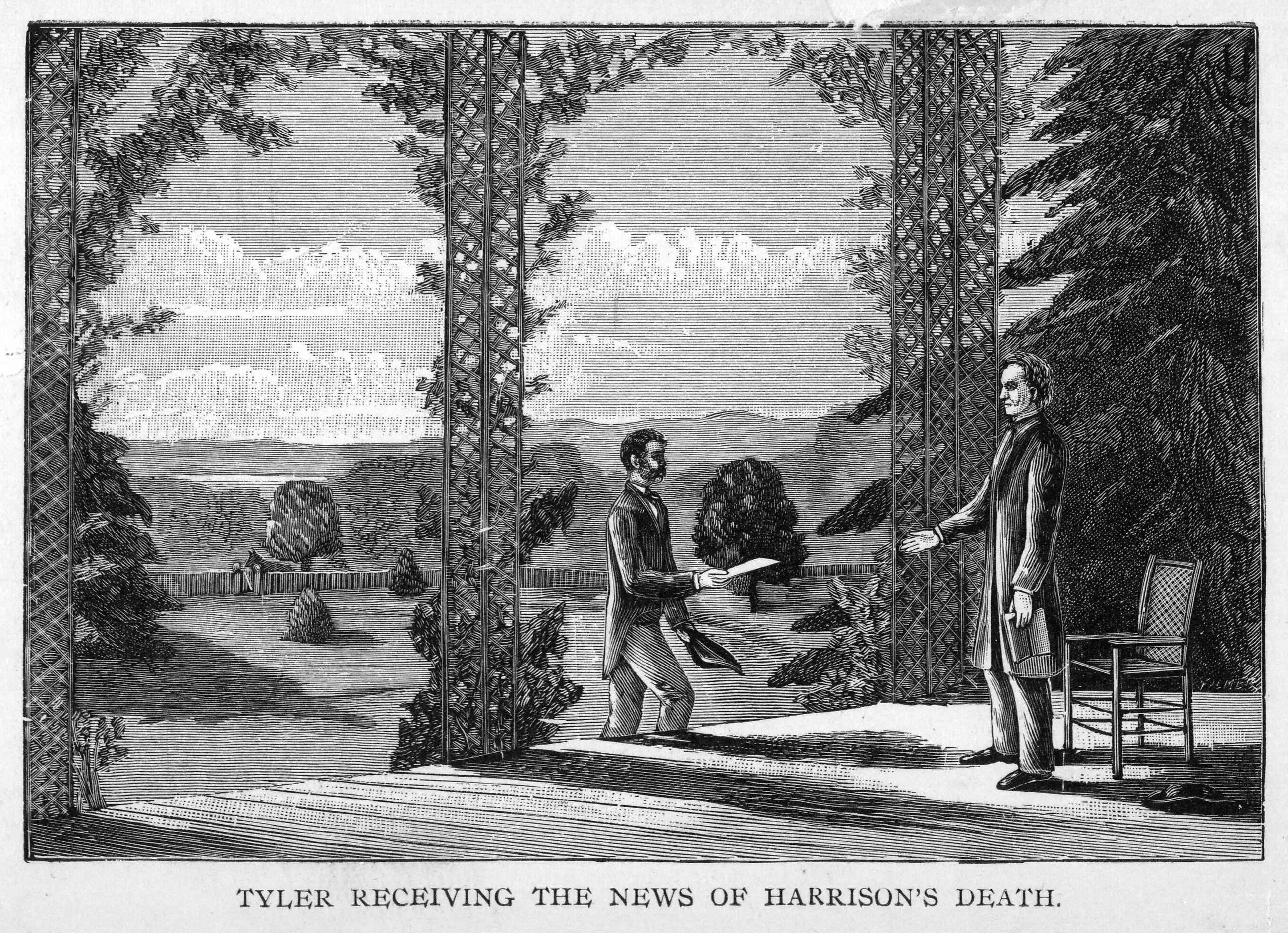
April 4: President Harrison dies in office; Vice President Tyler succeeds him as the tenth U.S. president

- January 30 – A fire destroys 300 of the 500 housing units in Mayagüez, Puerto Rico, Spanish Empire.
- February 18–March 11 – First ongoing filibuster in the United States Senate.
- February 24 – Richland County is chartered by the Illinois General Assembly.
- March 4 – William Henry Harrison is sworn in as the ninth president of the United States, and John Tyler is sworn in as the tenth vice president.
- March 9 – Amistad: The Supreme Court of the United States rules in the case that the Africans who seized control of the ship had been taken into slavery illegally.
- April 4 – President William Henry Harrison dies of pneumonia, becoming the first president of the United States to die in office and at one month, the president with the shortest term served. He is succeeded by Vice President John Tyler, who becomes the tenth president of the United States.
- April 6 – President John Tyler is sworn in.
- April 20 – Edgar Allan Poe's short story "The Murders in the Rue Morgue" is published in Graham's Magazine (Philadelphia) (of which he became editor in February). The story will be recognized as the first significant work of detective fiction.
- June 21 – Fordham University is opened in The Bronx by the Society of Jesus as St. John's College.
- July 28 – Mary Rogers, the "Beautiful Cigar Girl", is found murdered in New York City.
- August 2 – Benjamin Fitzpatrick is elected the 11th governor of Alabama defeating James W. McLung.
- August 16 – President John Tyler vetoes a bill which called for the re-establishment of the Second Bank of the United States. Enraged Whig Party members riot outside the White House in the most violent demonstration on White House grounds in U.S. history.
- September 13 – President John Tyler vetos another bill addressing his constitutional concerns. In response, the Whigs expel him from their party.
- September 17 – John C. Colt murders Samuel Adams in an argument over a business debt in New York City.
- November 7 – Slaves bound for sale in New Orleans take control of the Creole, eventually sailing to freedom in British Nassau.
- c. November – The city of Dallas in Texas is founded by John Neely Bryan.
- Solomon Northrup is kidnapped in the District of Columbia and shipped to a slave market in New Orleans.
- Frederick Douglass speaks at the Massachusetts Anti-slavery Society Convention.
- P. T. Barnum purchases Scudder's American Museum in New York City.
- John Augustus develops the concept of probation in Boston, Massachusetts, by standing bail for lesser offenders.
- The first steam self-propelled fire engine in the U.S. is completed by Paul Rapsey Hodge for use in New York City.

=== Ongoing ===
- Second Seminole War (1835–1842)

== Births ==
- March 1 – Blanche Bruce, U.S. Senator from Mississippi from 1875 to 1881 (died 1898)
- March 8 – Oliver Wendell Holmes Jr., Associate Justice of the Supreme Court of the United States (died 1935)
- March 10 – Ina Coolbrith, poet (died 1928)
- May 10 – James Gordon Bennett, Jr., newspaper publisher (died 1918)
- April 8 – William J. Babcock, Medal of Honor recipient (died 1897)
- May 15
  - James Henderson Berry, U.S. Senator from Arkansas from 1885 to 1907 (died 1913)
  - Clarence Dutton, geologist (died 1912)
- June 1 – Edward Lyon Buchwalter, businessman (died 1933)
- July 5 – Mary Arthur McElroy, de facto First Lady of the United States from 1881 to 1885 (died 1917)
- July 11 – James A. Barber, Medal of Honor recipient (died 1925)
- September 8 – Charles J. Guiteau, assassin of President James A. Garfield (executed 1882)
- October 12 – Joseph O'Dwyer, physician (died 1898)
- October 18 – Bishop W. Perkins, U.S. Senator from Kansas from 1892 to 1893 (died 1894)
- October 29 – William Harris, U.S. Senator from Kansas from 1897 to 1903 (died 1909)
- November 6 – Nelson W. Aldrich, U.S. Senator from Rhode Island from 1881 to 1911 (died 1915)
- November 13 – Edward Burd Grubb, Jr., American Civil War Union Brevet Brigadier General (died 1913)
- December 8 – Thomas R. Bard, U.S. Senator from California from 1900 to 1905 (died 1915)
- Jennie de la Montagnie Lozier, physician (died 1915)

== Deaths ==
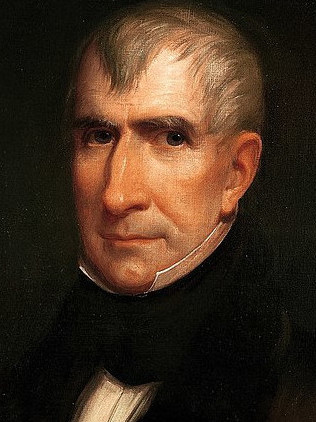
William Henry Harrison

- February 25 – Philip P. Barbour, Associate Justice of the U.S. Supreme Court from 1836 to 1841 (born 1783)
- April 4 – William Henry Harrison, ninth president of the United States from March to April 1841 (born 1773)
- September 25 – John Chandler, politician (born 1762)
- October 6 – George Childress, lawyer and politician (born 1804)
- October 21 – John Forsyth, U.S. Senator from Georgia from 1818 to 1819 and 1829 to 1834 (born 1780)

== See also ==
- Timeline of United States history (1820–1859)
