= 1841 Alabama gubernatorial election =

- August 2, 1841
- Turnout: 8.33%
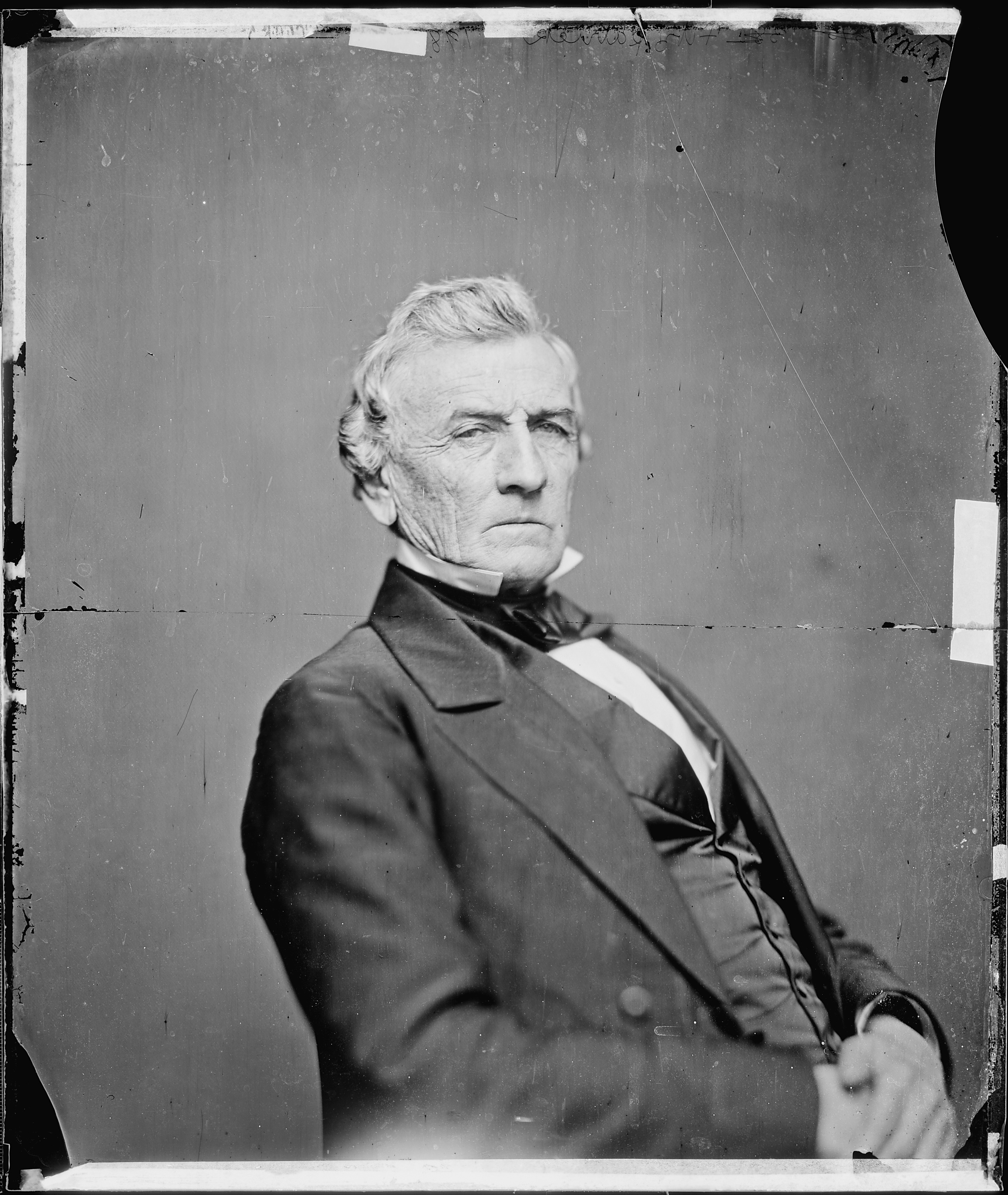

Nominee	Benjamin Fitzpatrick	James W. McClung
Party	Democratic	Whig
Popular vote	27,974	21,219
Percentage	56.87%	43.13%
- County results Fitzpatrick: 50–60% 60–70% 70–80% 80–90% >90% McClung: 50–60% 60–70% 70–80% Unknown/No Vote
Governor before election
Arthur P. Bagby
Democratic
Elected Governor
Benjamin Fitzpatrick
Democratic

The 1841 Alabama gubernatorial election took place on August 2, 1841, in order to elect the governor of Alabama. The term started on November 22, 1841. Democrat Benjamin Fitzpatrick won his first term as Governor with 56.87% of the vote.

== Candidates ==
=== Democratic Party ===
- Benjamin Fitzpatrick, candidate for the 1837 election but lost in the primary.

=== Independent Whig ===
- James W. McClung, Member of the Alabama State Legislature 1822-1844, Speaker of the House 1835-1838, Member of the Alabama Senate 1845-1849.

== Election ==
1841 Alabama gubernatorial election
Party	Candidate	Votes	%	±%
Democratic	Benjamin Fitzpatrick	27,974	56.87%	−35.42%
Independent Whig	James W. McClung	21,219	43.13%	+35.42%
Total votes		56,513	100.00%	N/A
Democratic hold				
