= James White McClung =

American lawyer and politician during the early days of Alabama statehood

- James White McClung ca. 1840
- Born: June 6, 1798; Knoxville, Tennessee, US
- Died: May 31, 1848 (aged 49); Huntsville, Alabama
- Resting place: Old Gray Cemetery, Knoxville, Tennessee
- Occupations: Lawyer, politician
- Spouses: Sarah Elizabeth Mitchell; Elizabeth Spotswood; Margaret Patrick
- Children: Charles William McClung; Mary Anne Cameron McClung (McClung); David Brydie Mitchell McClung; Hugh Lawson White McClung; Thomas Fearn McClung; Matthew McClung Robinson; James White McClung; Elliott Spotswood McClung; William Penn McClung; Annie Parsons McClung (White); Frank Armstrong McClung; Howard McClung; Arthur Henderson McClung.
- Parent(s): Charles McClung and Margaret White

James White McClung (June 6, 1798 – May 31, 1848) was an American lawyer and politician in Alabama. He served in the Alabama state legislature between 1822 and 1844, was Speaker of the Alabama House of Representatives from 1835–1838, and served in the Alabama Senate from 1845–1849. At the time of his death he was a candidate for the United States Senate, without opposition. McClung Avenue in Huntsville is named for him, the first street in that city to be named after a local citizen.

== Biography ==
McClung was born in Knoxville, Tennessee, to Charles McClung and Margaret White McClung. His father was a leading citizen of Knoxville in its early days, and his mother was the daughter of General James White, founder of White's Fort, which became Knoxville after Charles McClung laid out its initial street grid. He attended Blount College (now the University of Tennessee) and the University of North Carolina, graduating in 1816 with a law degree. He settled in Huntsville, Alabama, shortly after Alabama became a state in 1819.

He was first elected to the state legislature in 1822 and soon became embroiled in a feud with Andrew Wills, editor of the Huntsville Democrat. Wills was a strong opponent of the Bank of the United States, and regularly attacked two leading pro-Bank legislators, Dr David Moore and Clement Comer Clay, in the press. McClung was Clay's law partner, and when Wills accused McClung of bribing the Alabama state legislature to elect Clay to the United States Senate, the ongoing press war spilled into the streets. On July 23, 1827, a confrontation between McClung and Wills on the courthouse square turned into a duel. In an exchange of shots, Wills was killed by McClung. Clay represented McClung at the subsequent trial, and, "in true frontier style," McClung was acquitted by the jury.

He served six terms in the state legislature between 1822 and 1844 before his 1844 election to a four-year term in the State Senate. Between legislative terms he ran for governor in 1841 as an independent, losing to the Democratic candidate, Benjamin Fitzpatrick. A contemporary observer described him as "fighting for what others could not see or understand, however obvious his policy to himself", though the same source added that as a lawyer, "His qualifications as presiding officer were of the highest order".

McClung married three times. His first wife was Sarah Elizabeth Mitchell, daughter of Georgia governor David Brydie Mitchell. They had six children before her death on May 25, 1833. Upon his wife's death James White McClung placed his infant son Matthew in the care of his brother-in-law and wife, Mr and Mrs John Robinson of Huntsville. The Robinsons eventually adopted Matthew. On July 2, 1834, McClung married Elizabeth Spotswood; they had two children before her death on September 18, 1837. McClung's third wife, Margaret Patrick, was twenty years his junior when they married on June 6, 1839. They had six children.

The McClung House with its double plantation porches

McClung's Huntsville mansion, built in 1838, is on the National Register of Historic Places as part of the Twickenham Historic District and in the Library of Congress Historic American Buildings Survey.
