= Jeremiah Clemens =

American politician (1814–1865)

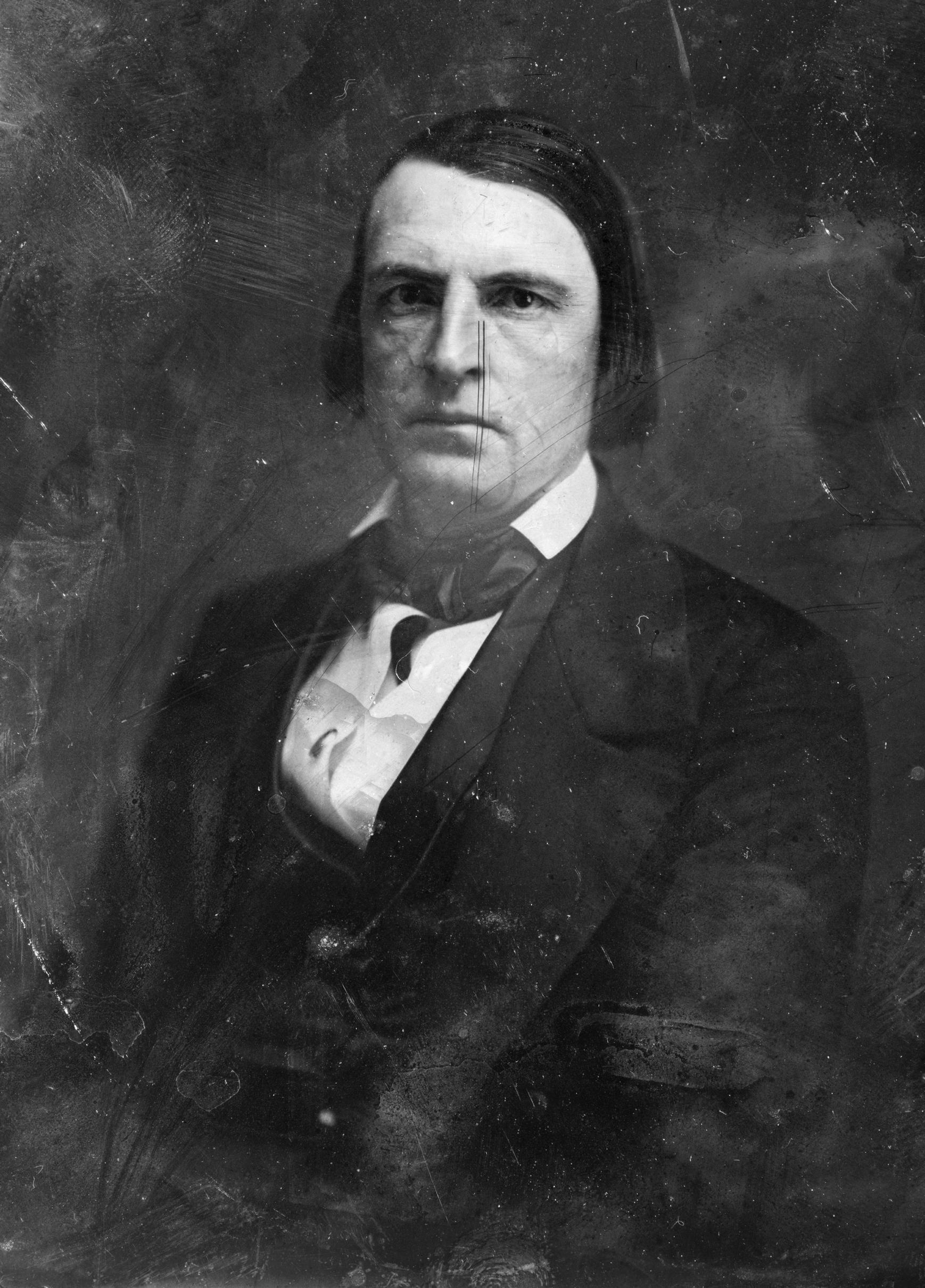
- Daguerreotype c. 1844–1860

United States Senator from Alabama
- In office November 30, 1849 – March 3, 1853
- Preceded by: Benjamin Fitzpatrick
- Succeeded by: Clement C. Clay

Member of the Alabama House of Representatives
- In office 1839–1841
- In office 1843–1844

Personal details
- Born: December 28, 1814 Huntsville, Alabama, U.S.
- Died: May 21, 1865 (aged 50) Huntsville, Alabama, U.S.
- Resting place: Maple Hill Cemetery
- Party: Democratic (1839–1850); Union (1850–1853); Know Nothing (1855–1856); National Union (1862–1865)
- Spouse: Mary L. Reed (m. 1834)
- Education: University of Alabama; Transylvania University
- Occupation: Politician; lawyer; novelist

Military service
- Allegiance: United States; Confederate States of America
- Branch/service: United States Army; Confederate Army
- Rank: Lieutenant Colonel
- Battles/wars: Mexican–American War; American Civil War

Jeremiah Clemens (December 28, 1814 – May 21, 1865) was a United States senator and novelist from Alabama. A Southern Unionist, he opposed the secession of Alabama from the Union in 1861 but briefly served in the Confederate Army. He was the author of Tobias Wilson, one of the first novels set during the American Civil War.

== Early life and education ==
Clemens was born at Huntsville, Alabama on December 28, 1814, the son of James and Sarah (Mills) Clemens. His parents migrated from Kentucky to what was then the Mississippi Territory in 1812, settling in what later became Madison County. Clemens was educated at LaGrange College and the University of Alabama, and later attended Transylvania University, where he studied law. In 1834, he married Mary L. Reed, the daughter of Huntsville merchant John Reed. Around the same time, he enlisted in the United States Army and participated in military action against the Cherokee Nation percipient to the Trail of Tears.

== Career ==
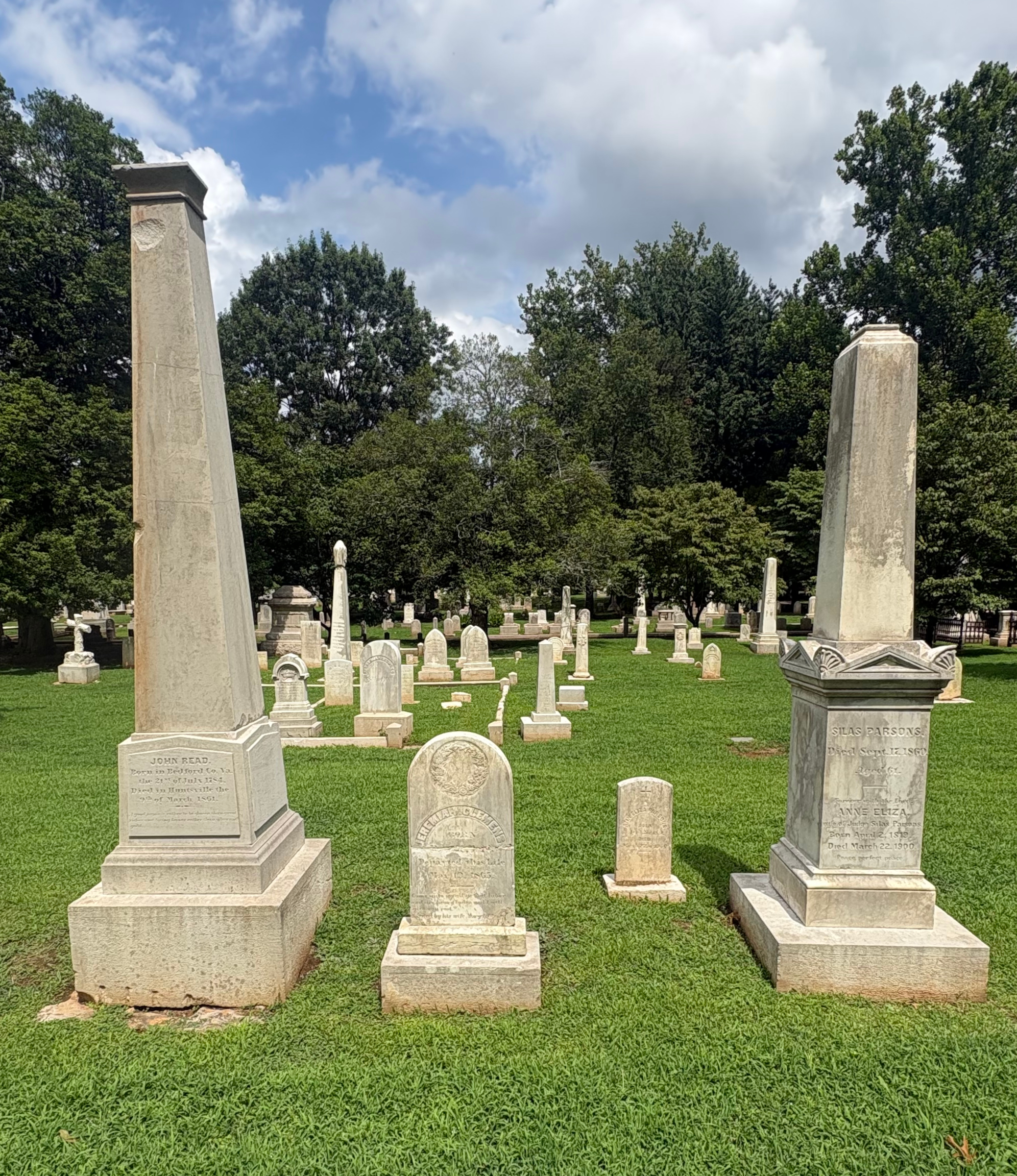
Clemens's grave (center) at Maple Hill Cemetery

Clemens joined the Democratic Party and was appointed the United States Attorney for northern and middle Alabama by President Martin Van Buren in 1839. The same year, he was elected to the Alabama House of Representatives, serving from 1839 to 1841. He served in the Texian Army following the Texas Revolution, and was subsequently elected to the United States House of Representatives, serving from 1843 to 1845. Following the U.S. annexation of Texas, Clemens volunteered again for the army and served in the Mexican–American War; he left the army in 1848 with the rank of colonel.

Clemens was elected to the United States Senate in 1849 to fill the vacancy left by the death of Dixon Hall Lewis. Although a Democrat, Clemens owed his election to the support of Alabama's Whigs. He opposed the Compromise of 1850, but abruptly changed course following its passage and helped to organize the short-lived Union Party in Alabama. The Unionists swept the 1851 elections in Alabama, carrying two-thirds of the state's counties; however, Clemens was not re-elected to the Senate when his term ended in 1853. Dogged by accusations that he had purchased Whig support for his senatorial candidacy in 1848 with promises to back President Zachary Taylor's legislative agenda, and having earned the enmity of Alabama's Democrats by supporting the Union Party movement, he retired to his plantation with his public reputation severely damaged.

Following his departure from the Senate, Clemens joined the Know Nothing movement and was an unsuccessful candidate for the House of Representatives that year on the American Party ticket. He supported former President Millard Fillmore in the 1856 United States presidential election, campaigning on his behalf across northern Alabama, but the state voted for Democrat James Buchanan. Following this last defeat, Clemens retired from public life. He began a literary career, publishing three novels between 1856 and 1860: Bernard Lile (1856), Mustang Gray (1858), and The Rivals (1859). The secession crisis following the election of Abraham Lincoln prompted Clemens's reentry to politics in the winter of 1860–61. Clemens denounced secession in the pages of the Montgommery Advertiser and as a delegate to the 1861 secession convention. When the delegates voted in favor of secession, however, Clemens reluctantly signed the ordinance announcing Alabama's departure from the Union. He accepted a commission in the Alabama militia, but his ambivalence towards the Confederate cause led him to resign within the year. In 1862, he crossed into Union lines and became Alabama's foremost Southern Unionist. His fourth novel, Tobias Wilson, describes Unionist guerrilla warfare in northern Alabama. The war had a radicalizing effect on Clemens's politics, and he became an outspoken defender of the Lincoln Administration. Clemens strongly supported Lincoln's re-election in the 1864 presidential campaign and traveled to Washington, D.C. to write campaign literature in support of Lincoln's National Union Party. Following Lincolns' assassination, Clemens urged his successor, fellow Southern Unionist Andrew Johnson, urging him to complete the abolition of slavery in the United States, but died on May 21, 1865 before he could take an active role in Reconstruction.

He was buried at Maple Hill Cemetery in Huntsville.

== Novels ==
Clemens was most famous outside of Alabama during his lifetime as a novelist. Bernard Lile (Philadelphia, 1856) and Mustang Grey (1857) were at least partly autobiographical novels set in the Texas War of Independence and the Mexican–American War and both received critical acclaim at the time of their release. The Rivals (1859) was a novelization of the enmity between Aaron Burr and Alexander Hamilton. His final novel, Tobias Wilson, published posthumously in 1865, was an account of Unionist partisans who fought during the Civil War in the mountains of Alabama near Clemens' hometown of Huntsville. He was engaged in the preparation of a history of the war, giving an insight into the character, causes, and conduct of the war in northern Alabama, but it was left unfinished at his death.

== Family ==
Jeremiah Clemens was a distant cousin of Samuel Langhorne Clemens, better known as Mark Twain.

U.S. Senate
Preceded by Benjamin Fitzpatrick	U.S. senator (Class 2) from Alabama; November 30, 1849 – March 3, 1853; Served alongside: William R. King and Benjamin Fitzpatrick	Succeeded by Clement C. Clay
