= Benjamin Fitzpatrick =

American politician (1802–1869)

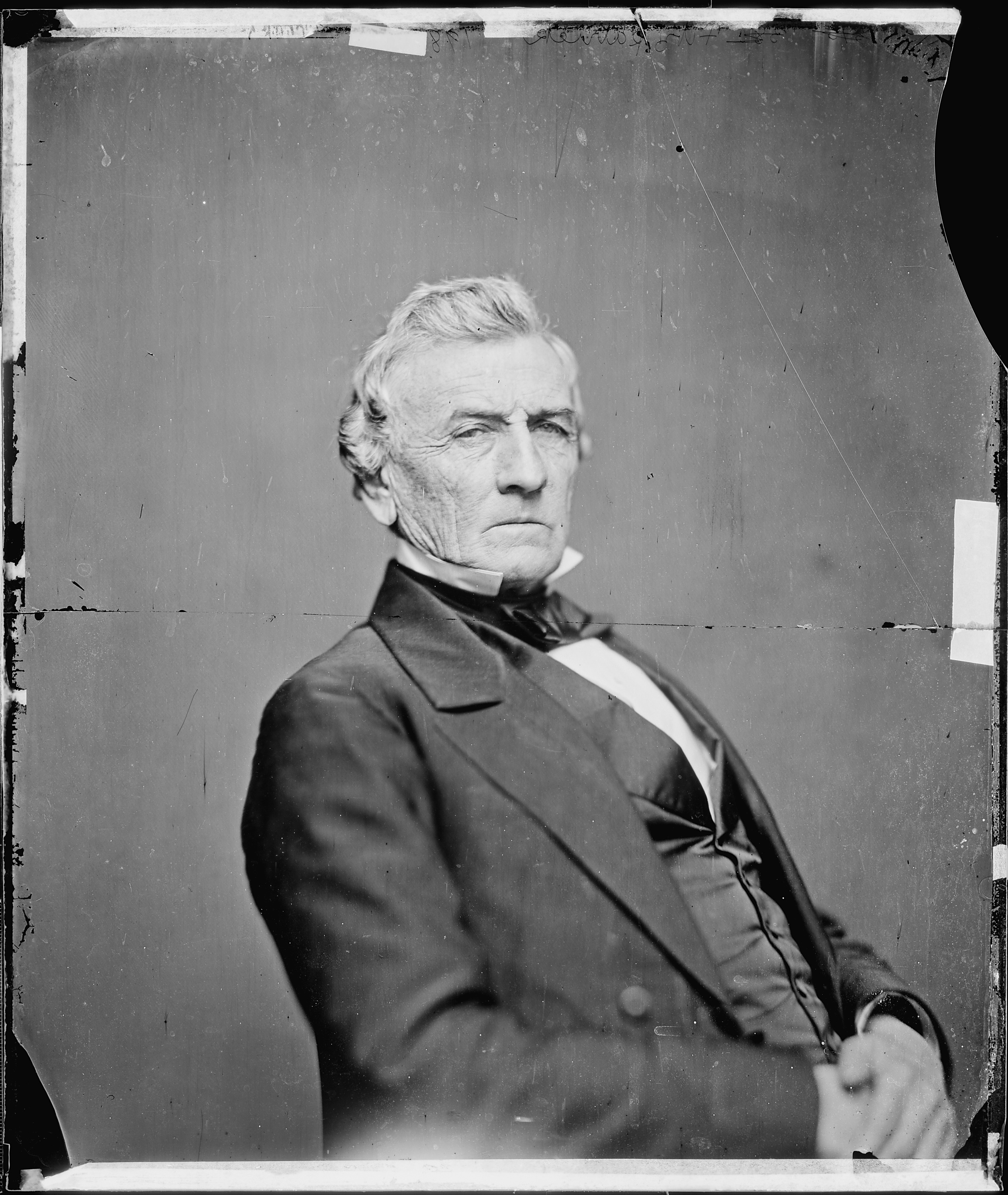

President pro tempore of the United States Senate
- In office June 26, 1860 – December 2, 1860
- Preceded by: Jesse D. Bright
- Succeeded by: Solomon Foot
- In office December 7, 1857 – February 26, 1860
- Preceded by: Thomas Jefferson Rusk
- Succeeded by: Jesse D. Bright

United States Senator from Alabama
- In office November 26, 1855 – January 21, 1861
- Succeeded by: George E. Spencer (1868)
- In office January 14, 1853 – March 3, 1855
- Preceded by: William R. King
- In office November 25, 1848 – November 30, 1849
- Appointed by: Reuben Chapman
- Preceded by: Dixon Lewis
- Succeeded by: Jeremiah Clemens

11th Governor of Alabama
- In office November 22, 1841 – December 10, 1845
- Preceded by: Arthur P. Bagby
- Succeeded by: Joshua L. Martin

Personal details
- Born: Benjamin Fitzpatrick; June 30, 1802 Greene County, Georgia, U.S.
- Died: November 21, 1869 (aged 67) Wetumpka, Alabama, U.S.
- Resting place: Oakwood Cemetery (Montgomery, Alabama)
- Party: Democratic
- Spouses: Sarah Elmore (m. 1827; died 1839) Aurelia Blassingame (m. 1847)
- Children: 7

Benjamin Fitzpatrick (June 30, 1802 – November 21, 1869) was an American politician who served as the 11th governor of Alabama and as a United States senator from that state. He was a Democrat.

== Early life ==
Fitzpatrick was born on June 30, 1802 in Greene County, Georgia to William Fitzpatrick, a long-serving member of the Georgia legislature, and Anne Phillips Fitzpatrick. Fitzpatrick was orphaned at the age of seven, taken in by his brothers and sisters, and moved to Alabama, where he attended public school but received little formal education. He relocated by himself to the Mississippi Territory at the age of 14.

Fitzpatrick helped his brothers manage the land they owned on the Alabama River and served as deputy under the first sheriff of Autauga County. He worked and studied law in the law office of Nimrod E. Benson, who was the mayor of Montgomery, and he was admitted to the bar in 1821 at the age of 19. Shortly thereafter, he was elected to be solicitor of the Montgomery circuit; he was reelected to the position in 1825, defeating Samuel W. Mardis. In 1823, he established a law practice in Montgomery.

In 1827, he married Sarah Terry Elmore, the daughter of John Archer Elmore and a member of the wealthy and prominent family of which Elmore County was named after. That same year he retired from his law practice due to ill health and moved to his plantation in Autauga County that he had acquired from his marriage. Fitzpatrick and Sarah had six sons together. He declined to seek reelection as circuit solictor in order to devote time to overseeing the operation of the plantation, which turned out to be lucrative. In 1830, Fitzpatrick owned 30 slaves, and by 1850, this number had raised to 106. His wife died in 1837, and this marked Fitzpatrick's turn towards politics. He would later marry Aurelia Blassingame in 1847, with whom he had a seventh son.

== Political career ==
=== Governor of Alabama ===
In 1837, Fitzpatrick was narrowly defeated by Arthur P. Bagby after being considered for the Alabama gubernatorial nomination by the Democratic legislative caucus. Fitzpatrick became governor of Alabama after being elected in 1841 on the Democratic ticket, defeating the Whig nominee James White McClung with roughly 57% of the vote. His nomination had been secured after serving as a Democratic elector and for performing a statewide canvas for Martin Van Buren.

Issues concerning the Bank of Alabama haunted his gubernatorial tenure, just as it had his three predecessors. He had campaigned to Alabamians stating he would approach the banks with no bias and assured them that he was not involved with the banks. Initially, Fitzpatrick desired to preserve the bank by closing only one of its four branches, but this did not garner support from lawmakers who sought to see all four branches shutdown. As a result, he signed legislation that liquidated the branches, while only preserving the main branch in Tuscaloosa. This action was very popular amongst the public, and because of this support, Fitzpatrick embraced a staunch anti-bank stance and supported policies that removed the state being involved with banking at all. It has been noted that Fitzpatrick had a preference for inactive government because of his Jacksonian commitments; though, he did not share its animosity toward corporate capitalism. It was these commitments that initially attracted him to the Democratic Party. Though much of his gubernatorial tenure centered on limiting state involvement with the bank, his anti-government stances also influenced his negative views toward taxation, which he deemed to be modern oppression, and he supported a constitutional amendment to change the frequency the Alabama legislature would meet from annual to biennial.

He was reelected in 1843 with no opposition. His second tenure saw him refuse to renew the bank's charter after it expired in January 1845, and furthermore, he signed legislation ending the state's involvement with the bank. However, he did oppose efforts by radical Democrats in the state legislature to repudiate the state's debts which had largely been accumulated by the state's involvement with the bank. He left office in December 1845, and was subsequently chosen by the legislature to serve on a three-man commission to oversee the final liquidation of the bank.

=== U.S. Senate ===
In 1848, Governor Reuben Chapman appointed Fitzpatrick to fill the U.S. Senate vacancy caused by the death of Senator Dixon H. Lewis. He served from November 25, 1848 to November 30, 1849, when a successor was elected.

He was again appointed on January 14, 1853, and elected on December 12, 1853, to the Senate to fill the vacancy caused by the resignation of William R. King, who had been elected Vice President of the United States, and served from January 14, 1853, to March 3, 1855. He served in that Congress as Chairman of the Committee on Printing and the Committee on Engrossed Bills. He was elected to the Senate again to fill the vacancy caused by the failure of the legislature to elect his successor on November 26, 1855. In that role, he served several times as President pro tempore of the Senate.

=== Vice presidential nomination ===
In 1860, Fitzpatrick was nominated for Vice President of the United States by the wing of the Democratic Party that had nominated Stephen A. Douglas of Illinois for president. However, he refused the nomination, and Herschel V. Johnson of Georgia was ultimately nominated. Fitzpatrick withdrew from the Senate on January 21, 1861, following the secession of his home state.

=== Confederacy ===
Fitzpatrick did not take a particularly active role in the politics of the Confederacy, although he served as president of the constitutional convention of Alabama in 1865.

== Death ==
He died on his Oak Grove Plantation near Wetumpka, Alabama, on November 21, 1869, aged 67.

Party political offices
Preceded by Arthur P. Bagby	Democratic nominee for Governor of Alabama; 1841, 1843	Succeeded by Nathaniel Terry
Preceded by John C. Breckinridge	Democratic nominee for Vice President of the United States^{(1)} Withdrew; 1860	Succeeded by Herschel Vespasian Johnson
Political offices
Preceded by Arthur P. Bagby	Governor of Alabama; 1841–1845	Succeeded by Joshua L. Martin
Preceded by Thomas Jefferson Rusk	President pro tempore of the United States Senate; 1857–1860	Succeeded by Jesse D. Bright
Preceded by Jesse D. Bright	President pro tempore of the United States Senate; 1860	Succeeded by Solomon Foot
U.S. Senate
Preceded by Dixon Lewis	U.S. Senator (Class 2) from Alabama; 1848–1849; Served alongside: William R. King	Succeeded by Jeremiah Clemens
Preceded by William R. King	U.S. Senator (Class 3) from Alabama; 1853–1861; Served alongside: Clement Clay	Vacant Title next held by George E. Spencer
Notes and references
1. The Democratic Party split in 1860, producing two vice presidential candidates. Fitzpatrick was nominated by the Northern Democrats; Joseph Lane was nominated by the rebel Southern Democrats.
