= 1854–55 United States House of Representatives elections =

House elections for the 34th U.S. Congress

- August 4, 1854 – November 6, 1855

All 234 seats in the United States House of Representatives 118 seats needed for a majority
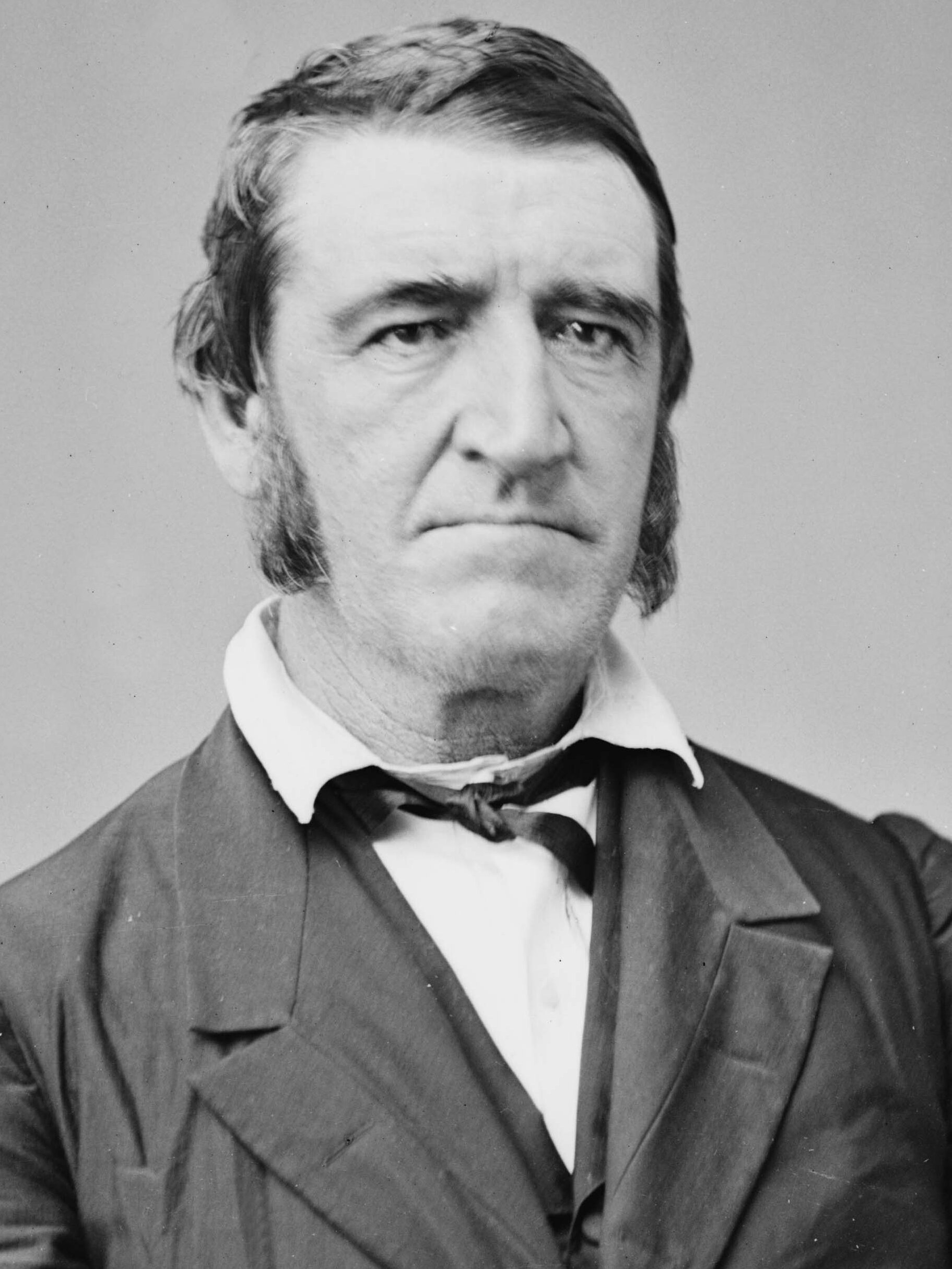

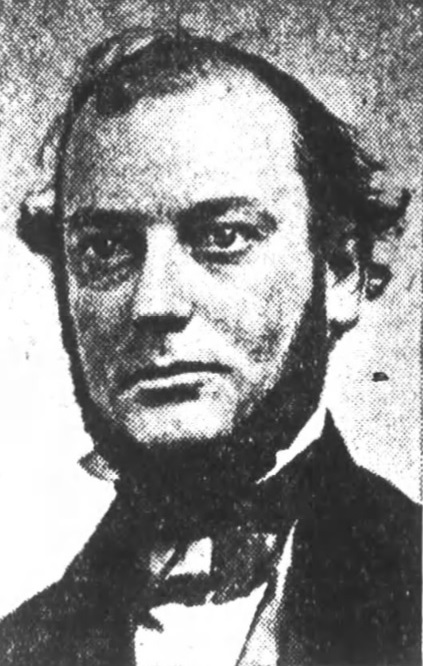

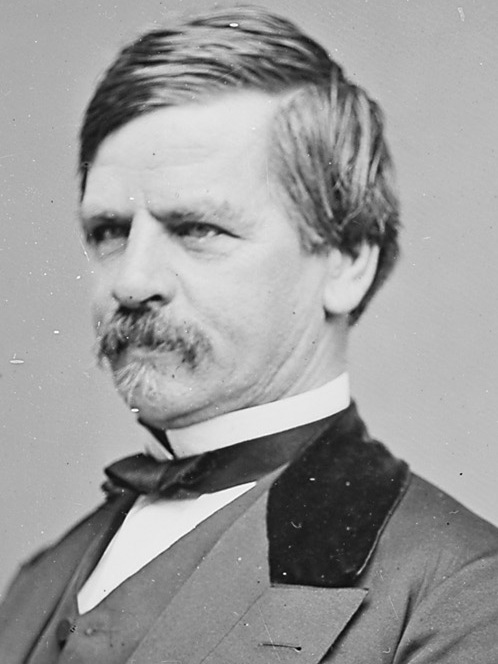
	First party	Second party	Third party
Leader	William A. Richardson	Henry M. Fuller	Nathaniel P. Banks
Party	Democratic	Whig	Know Nothing
Leader's seat	Illinois 5th	Pennsylvania 12th	Massachusetts 7th
Last election	157 seats, 50.73%	70 seats, 42.62%	0 seats, 0.31%
Seats won	82 (Note: Including 4 Soft-Shell Democrats, 2 Anti-Broderick Democrats, 1 Anti-Benton Democrat from Missouri, and 1 Hard-Shell Democrat.) (Note: Anti-Nebraska Democrat Lyman Trumbull won the general election in Illinois's 8th congressional district but resigned before the start of the term. Democrat James L. D. Morrison won the 1856 special election for this seat, increasing the Democratic caucus to 83 seats.) (Note: Sources differ regarding the precise number of Democratic members. Dubin lists 82 Democrats elected to the 34th United States Congress, Martis lists 83, while the Tribune Almanac for 1856 lists 79 "National Administration" Democrats in addition to the vacant seat representing Illinois's 8th congressional district.)	54	52 (Note: Sources differ regarding the precise number of Know Nothing members. Dubin lists 52 Know Nothings elected to the 34th United States Congress, Martis lists 51, while the Tribune Almanac includes the Northern Know Nothings as part of the plurality-winning Anti-Nebraska group.)
Seat change	▼75	▼14	▲52
Popular vote	1,465,454 (Note: Including all votes for Democrats, Anti-Broderick Democrats, Anti-Benton Democrats, Hard Shell Democrats, and Soft Shell Democrats.)	574,791	621,726
Percentage	45.43%	17.82%	19.27%
Swing	▼5.30 pp	▼24.80 pp	▲18.96 pp
	Fourth party	Fifth party	Sixth party
Party	Anti-Nebraska	Republican	People's
Last election	Did not contest	Did not contest	Did not contest
Seats won	22 (Note: Anti-Nebraska Democrat Lyman Trumbull won the general election in Illinois's 8th congressional district but resigned before the start of the term, reducing the Anti-Nebraska caucus to 21 seats.)	13	9
Seat change	▲22	▲13	▲9
Popular vote	196,461	182,245	102,423
Percentage	6.09%	5.65%	3.18%
Swing	New party	New party	New party
	Seventh party	Eighth party
Party	Free Soil	Independent
Last election	4 seats, 4.10%	2 seats (Note: Including 1 Independent and 1 Independent Democrat.), 1.67%
Seats won	1	1 (Note: Including 1 Independent Whig, Anthony E. Roberts, elected from Pennsylvania's 9th congressional district.)
Seat change	▼3	▼1
Popular vote	22,928	40,523 (Note: Including all votes for Independents, Benton Democrats, Independent Democrats, and Independent Americans.)
Percentage	0.71%	1.26%
Swing	▼3.39 pp	▼0.41 pp
- Results: Democratic gain Whig gain Democratic hold Whig hold Know Nothing gain Anti-Nebraska gain Republican gain People's gain Free Soil gain Independent gain
Speaker before election
Linn Boyd
Democratic
Elected Speaker
Nathaniel P. Banks
Know Nothing

States held the 1854–55 United States House of Representatives elections between August 4, 1854, and November 6, 1855, to elect the 234 members and five non-voting delegates of the United States House of Representatives. The Democratic Party remained the largest party but lost almost half its seats, while Know Nothings and the Anti-Nebraska movement made large gains. The Whig Party largely failed to capitalize on the weakness of its major rival, signaling the collapse of the Second Party System.

Controversy surrounding the Kansas-Nebraska Act and nativist opposition to Catholic immigration dominated the 1854 United States elections. Popular outrage against the Nebraska law produced new political parties in Indiana, Ohio, Michigan, and Wisconsin that included most former Whigs, Free Soilers, and Anti-Nebraska Democrats. As many as one in four Northern Democrats abandoned their party, while Democrats suffered a net loss of 70 seats in the free states. Northern Whigs hoped to benefit from Democratic misfortunes, but were weighed down by their own internal divisions and the rise of the Know Nothing movement in the Northeastern United States. Know Nothings swept Massachusetts and made gains in New York and Pennsylvania, where Whig candidates in some districts formed alliances with local lodges. In Iowa, Illinois, and Vermont, Whigs felt compelled to appeal to Free Soilers to shore up their sagging margins. The willingness of Northern Whigs to cooperate with Free Soilers and abolitionists, combined with the magnitude of Whig losses in the Northeast, led Southern Whigs to defect en masse to the Know Nothings in elections held in 1855.

No party controlled a majority in the lower chamber when the 34th United States Congress met in December 1855, leading to a protracted struggle to organize the House. Different groupings of Whigs, Know Nothings, and Anti–Nebraska men controlled between 105 and 117 seats in the House of Representatives, short of the 118 votes needed to elect a speaker. After two months of deadlock, the rule requiring a majority to elect the speaker was suspended; Massachusetts representative Nathaniel P. Banks was elected by a coalition of free state members on the 133rd ballot. The coalition supporting Banks became the base for the Republican Party, which emerged as the main opposition to the Democrats during the 1856 United States elections.

== Results ==
=== Analysis ===
The elections took place over the span of 15 months, against the backdrop of a political realignment. Party arrangements had changed considerably by the time the House met in December 1855. Contemporaries and later historians advanced differing estimates of the state of parties at the beginning of the 34th Congress. The Tribune Almanac for 1856 counts 79 "National Administration" Democrats, 37 proslavery Whigs and Know Nothings, 117 Anti-Nebraska men, and one vacancy at the start of the new term. The representatives counted as part of the Anti-Nebraska group were elected under a variety of labels, including as Know Nothings, Whigs, and Republicans. Kenneth C. Martis finds 83 Democrats, 51 Know Nothings, and 100 Opposition members in his 1989 study of political parties in the United States Congress. Martis's "Opposition Party" is not a true historical political party, but a modern designation grouping representatives elected by several parties. Michael J. Dubin lists the representatives' parties at the time of their election, finding 82 Democrats, 52 Know Nothings, 54 Whigs, one Independent Whig, and 45 members elected by various antislavery parties.

Author (Year)	D	KN	Others	V
Greeley (1856)	79	37 (Note: "Pro-Slavery" Whigs and Know Nothings)	117 A	1
McPherson (1988)	80	50	105 R	0
Martis (1989)	83	51	100 O	0
Dubin (1998)	82	52	100 (Note: Including 54 Whigs, 22 Anti-Nebraska, 9 People's, 1 Free Soil Democrat, and 1 Independent Whig.)	0

=== Results by state ===

↓
82	1	1	9	13	22	52	54
Democratic	IW	FS	P	Rep.	Anti-Neb.	Know Nothing	Whig

State	Type	Date	Total seats	Democratic		Whig		Know Nothing		Anti-Nebraska (Note: Including: Outgoing: 4 Free Soilers; Incoming: 22 Anti-Nebraskans, 13 Republicans, 9 People's, and 1 Free Soil Democrat)	
State	Type	Date	Total seats	Seats	Change	Seats	Change	Seats	Change	Seats	Change
Arkansas	Districts	August 4, 1854	2	2	Steady	0	Steady	0	Steady	0	Steady
Iowa	Districts	August 7, 1854	2	1	Steady	1	Steady	0	Steady	0	Steady
Missouri	Districts	August 7, 1854	7	1	▼2	6	▲2	0	Steady	0	Steady
Vermont	Districts	September 5, 1854	3	0	Steady	3	Steady	0	Steady	0	Steady
California	At-large	September 6, 1854	2	2	Steady	0	Steady	0	Steady	0	Steady
Maine	Districts	September 11, 1854	6	1	▼2	0	▼3	0	Steady	5	▲5
Florida	At-large	October 2, 1854	1	1	Steady	0	Steady	0	Steady	0	Steady
South Carolina	Districts	October 9–10, 1854	6	6	Steady	0	Steady	0	Steady	0	Steady
Indiana	Districts	October 10, 1854	11	2	▼8	0	▼1	0	Steady	9	▲9
Ohio	Districts	October 10, 1854	21	0	▼12	0	▼7	0	Steady	21	▲19
Pennsylvania	Districts	October 10, 1854	25	7	▼10	16 (Note: Including 1 Independent Whig.)	▲8	1	▲1	1	▲1
Illinois	Districts	November 7, 1854 (Election Day) (Note: In 1845, Congress passed a law providing for a uniform date for choosing presidential electors (see: Statutes at Large, 28th Congress, 2nd Session, p. 721). Congressional elections were unaffected by this law, but the date was gradually adopted by the states for congressional elections as well.)	9	4	▼1	1	▼3	0	Steady	4	▲4
Michigan	Districts	November 7, 1854 (Election Day)	4	1	▼3	0	Steady	0	Steady	3	▲3
New Jersey	Districts	November 7, 1854 (Election Day)	5	1	▼3	4	▲3	0	Steady	0	Steady
New York	Districts	November 7, 1854 (Election Day)	33	5	▼16	24	▲14	4	▲4	0	▼1
Wisconsin	Districts	November 7, 1854 (Election Day)	3	1	▼2	0	Steady	0	Steady	2	▲2
Massachusetts	Districts	November 12, 1854	11	0	▼1	0	▼9	11	▲11	0	▼1
Delaware	At-large	November 14, 1854	1	0	▼1	0	Steady	1	▲1	0	Steady
Late elections (after the March 4, 1855 beginning of the term)
New Hampshire	Districts	March 13, 1855	3	0	▼3	0	Steady	3	▲3	0	Steady
Connecticut	Districts	April 2, 1855	4	0	▼4	0	Steady	4	▲4	0	Steady
Rhode Island	Districts	April 4, 1855	2	0	▼2	0	Steady	2	▲2	0	Steady
Virginia	Districts	May 24, 1855	13	12	▼1	0	Steady	1	▲1	0	Steady
North Carolina	Districts	August 2, 1855	8	5	Steady	0	▼3	3	▲3	0	Steady
Tennessee	Districts	August 2, 1855	10	5	Steady	0	▼5	5	▲5	0	Steady
Alabama	Districts	August 6, 1855	7	5	▼1	0	▼1	2	▲2	0	Steady
Kentucky	Districts	August 6, 1855	10	4	▼1	0	▼5	6	▲6	0	Steady
Texas	Districts	August 6, 1855	2	1	▼1	0	Steady	1	▲1	0	Steady
Georgia	Districts	October 1, 1855	8	6	Steady	0	▼2	2	▲2	0	Steady
Louisiana	Districts	November 5, 1855	4	3	Steady	0	▼1	1	▲1	0	Steady
Mississippi	Districts (Note: At-large district abolished in redistricting.)	November 5–6, 1855	5	4	▼1	0	Steady	1	▲1	0	Steady
Maryland	Districts	November 6, 1855	6	2	▼2	0	▼2	4	▲4	0	Steady
Total			234	82 35.04%	▼75	55 23.50%	▼16	52 22.22%	▲52	45 19.23%	▲41

Popular vote
Democratic	43.95%
Know Nothing	19.56%
Whig	18.00%
Anti-Nebraska	6.09%
Republican	5.65%
People's	3.17%
Independent	2.61%
Free Soil	0.71%
Others	0.26%

House seats
Democratic	35.04%
Whig	23.08%
Know Nothing	22.22%
Anti-Nebraska	9.40%
Republican	5.56%
People's	3.85%
Independent Whig	0.43%
Free Soil	0.43%

=== Maps ===
Vacancies filled by special elections in 1854

Seats elected in 1854

Seats elected in 1855, including special elections

Winner's share of the popular vote

Congressional groups according to the Tribune Almanac (1855)

== Special elections ==
=== 33rd Congress ===
District	Incumbent			This race	
District	Member	Party	First elected	Results	Candidates
New York 29	Azariah Boody	Whig	1852	Incumbent resigned October 13, 1853. New member elected January 4, 1854. Whig hold.	▌ ✓ Davis Carpenter (Whig) 43.82%; ▌Frederick F. Backud (Democratic) 32.51%; ▌Calvin Huson (Free Soil) 20.87%
Pennsylvania 8	Henry A. Muhlenberg	Democratic	1852	Incumbent died January 9, 1854. New member elected February 4, 1854. Democratic hold.	▌ ✓ J. Glancy Jones (Democratic) 60.01%; ▌William H. Keim (Whig) 39.99%
Tennessee 1	Brookins Campbell	Democratic	1853	Incumbent died December 25, 1853. New member elected March 9, 1854. Whig gain.	▌ ✓ Nathaniel G. Taylor (Whig) 53.31%; ▌Samuel Milligan (Democratic) 46.04%; ▌William Boyce (Whig) 0.65%
Massachusetts 1	Zeno Scudder	Whig	1850	Incumbent resigned March 4, 1854. New member elected April 3, 1854. Whig hold.	▌ ✓ Thomas D. Eliot (Whig) 52.04%; ▌Abraham H. Howland (Independent) 47.96%
Virginia 11	John F. Snodgrass	Democratic	1853	Incumbent died June 5, 1854. New member elected August 3, 1854. Democratic hold.	▌ ✓ Charles S. Lewis (Democratic) 54.11%; ▌Benjamin A. Smith (Whig) 45.89%
New York 12	Gilbert Dean	Democratic	1850	Incumbent resigned July 3, 1854. New member elected November 7, 1854. Whig gain.	▌ ✓ Isaac Teller (Whig) 50.56%; ▌Samuel Morse (Soft-Shell Democratic) 31.27%; ▌Charles Robinson (Hard-Shell Democratic) 18.17%
New York 22	Gerrit Smith	Free Soil	1852	Incumbent resigned August 7, 1854. New member elected November 7, 1854. Whig gain.	▌ ✓ Henry C. Goodwin (Whig) 45.15%; ▌Sidney T. Fairchild (Soft Shell Democratic) 27.30%; ▌Federal Dana (Free Soil) 17.79%; ▌Zedock T. Bentley (Hard Shell Democratic) 9.77%
Kentucky 3	Presley Ewing	Whig	1851	Incumbent died September 27, 1854. New member elected November 13, 1854. Whig hold.	▌ ✓ Francis Bristow (Whig) 81.58%; ▌A. J. Halberson (Unknown) 18.42%

=== 34th Congress ===
District	Incumbent			This race	
District	Member	Party	First elected	Results	Candidates
Massachusetts 10	Henry Morris	Know Nothing	1854	Incumbent resigned September 20, 1855. New member elected November 6, 1855. Know Nothing hold.	▌ ✓ Calvin C. Chaffee (Know Nothing) 35.96%; ▌John W. Foster (Republican) 33.16%; ▌Haynes H. Chilson (Democratic) 25.29%; ▌Edward Dickinson (Whig) 5.60%

== Alabama ==
Alabama held elections on August 6, 1855.

District	Incumbent			This race	
District	Member	Party	First elected	Results	Candidates
Alabama 1	Philip Phillips	Democratic	1853	Incumbent retired. Know Nothing gain.	▌ ✓ Percy Walker (Know Nothing) 52.40%; ▌James A. Stallworth (Democratic) 47.60%
Alabama 2	James Abercrombie	Whig	1851	Incumbent retired. Democratic gain.	▌ ✓ Eli S. Shorter (Democratic) 54.89%; ▌Julius C. Alford (Know Nothing) 45.11%
Alabama 3	James F. Dowdell	Democratic	1853	Incumbent re-elected.	▌ ✓ James F. Dowdell (Democratic) 52.20%; ▌Thomas H. Watts (Know Nothing) 47.80%
Alabama 4	William Russell Smith	Democratic	1851	Incumbent re-elected to a new party. Know Nothing gain.	▌ ✓ William Russell Smith (Know Nothing) 59.83%; ▌Sydenham Moore (Democratic) 40.17%
Alabama 5	George S. Houston	Democratic	1843	Incumbent re-elected.	▌ ✓ George S. Houston (Democratic) 100.00%
Alabama 6	Williamson R. W. Cobb	Democratic	1847	Incumbent re-elected.	▌ ✓ Williamson R. W. Cobb (Democratic) 62.87%; ▌James M. Adams (Anti-Know Nothing Independent) 37.13%
Alabama 7	Sampson Willis Harris	Democratic	1847	Incumbent re-elected.	▌ ✓ Sampson Willis Harris (Democratic) 57.28%; ▌William B. Martin (Anti-Know Nothing Independent) 42.72%

== Arkansas ==
Arkansas held elections on August 4, 1854.

District	Incumbent			This race	
District	Member	Party	First elected	Results	Candidates
Arkansas 1	Alfred B. Greenwood	Democratic	1852	Incumbent re-elected.	▌ ✓ Alfred B. Greenwood (Democratic) 97.99%; ▌W. C. Myrtle (Unknown) 2.01%
Arkansas 2	Edward A. Warren	Democratic	1852	Incumbent retired. Democratic hold.	▌ ✓ Albert Rust (Democratic) 65.95%; ▌E. G. Walker (Whig) 34.05%

== California ==
California held elections on September 6, 1854.

District	Incumbent			This race	
District	Member	Party	First elected	Results	Candidates (Note: Each voter selected two candidates, who were elected at-large on a general ticket. Dubin calculates the percentage for each candidate out of the total number of ballots cast.)
California at-large 2 seats	Milton S. Latham	Democratic	1852	Incumbent withdrew. Democratic hold.	▌ ✓ James W. Denver (Anti-Broderick Democratic) 44.81%; ▌ ✓ Philemon T. Herbert (Anti-Broderick Democratic) 44.47%; ▌George Washington Bowie (Whig) 42.28%; ▌Calhoun Benham (Whig) 41.88%; ▌James Churchman (Broderick Democratic) 12.18%; ▌James A. McDougall (Broderick Democratic) 12.13%; ▌Milton S. Latham (Broderick Democratic) 2.24%
California at-large 2 seats	James A. McDougall	Democratic	1852	Incumbent lost re-election. Democratic hold.	▌ ✓ James W. Denver (Anti-Broderick Democratic) 44.81%; ▌ ✓ Philemon T. Herbert (Anti-Broderick Democratic) 44.47%; ▌George Washington Bowie (Whig) 42.28%; ▌Calhoun Benham (Whig) 41.88%; ▌James Churchman (Broderick Democratic) 12.18%; ▌James A. McDougall (Broderick Democratic) 12.13%; ▌Milton S. Latham (Broderick Democratic) 2.24%

== Connecticut ==
Connecticut held elections on April 2, 1855.

District	Incumbent			This race	
District	Member	Party	First elected	Results	Candidates
Connecticut 1	James T. Pratt	Democratic	1853	Incumbent lost re-election. Know Nothing gain.	▌ ✓ Ezra Clark Jr. (Know Nothing) 52.11%; ▌James T. Pratt (Democratic) 47.89%
Connecticut 2	Colin M. Ingersoll	Democratic	1851	Incumbent retired. Know Nothing gain.	▌ ✓ John Woodruff (Know Nothing) 55.50%; ▌Samuel Arnold (Democratic) 44.50%
Connecticut 3	Nathan Belcher	Democratic	1853	Incumbent lost re-election. Know Nothing gain.	▌ ✓ Sidney Dean (Know Nothing) 67.51%; ▌Joel W. White (Democratic) 32.49%
Connecticut 4	Origen S. Seymour	Democratic	1851	Incumbent retired. Know Nothing gain.	▌ ✓ William W. Welch (Know Nothing) 56.07%; ▌William H. Noble (Democratic) 43.93%

== Delaware ==
Delaware held elections on November 14, 1854.

District	Incumbent			This race	
District	Member	Party	First elected	Results	Candidates
Delaware at-large	George R. Riddle	Democratic	1850	Incumbent lost re-election. Know Nothing gain.	▌ ✓ Elisha D. Cullen (Know Nothing) 51.85%; ▌George R. Riddle (Democratic) 48.15%

== Florida ==
Florida held elections on October 2, 1854.

District	Incumbent			This race	
District	Member	Party	First elected	Results	Candidates
Florida at-large	Augustus Maxwell	Democratic	1852	Incumbent re-elected.	▌ ✓ Augustus Maxwell (Democratic) 55.26%; ▌Thomas Brown (Whig) 44.74%

== Georgia ==
Georgia held elections on October 1, 1855.

District	Incumbent			This race	
District	Member	Party	First elected	Results	Candidates
Georgia 1	James Lindsay Seward	Democratic	1853	Incumbent re-elected.	▌ ✓ James Lindsay Seward (Democratic) 57.62%; ▌Samuel Varnadoe (Know Nothing) 42.38%
Georgia 2	Alfred H. Colquitt	Democratic	1853	Incumbent retired. Democratic hold.	▌ ✓ Martin J. Crawford (Democratic) 51.99%; ▌Willis Hawkins (Know Nothing) 48.01%
Georgia 3	Jack Bailey	Democratic	1851	Incumbent retired. Know Nothing gain.	▌ ✓ Robert P. Trippe (Know Nothing) 53.96%; ▌James M. Smith (Democratic) 46.04%
Georgia 4	William B. W. Dent	Democratic	1853	Incumbent retired. Democratic hold.	▌ ✓ Hiram B. Warner (Democratic) 50.26%; ▌Benjamin H. Hill (Know Nothing) 49.74%
Georgia 5	Elijah W. Chastain	Democratic	1851	Incumbent retired. Democratic hold.	▌ ✓ John H. Lumpkin (Democratic) 58.61%; ▌Lewis Tumblin (Know Nothing) 41.39%
Georgia 6	Junius Hillyer	Democratic	1851	Incumbent retired. Democratic hold.	▌ ✓ Howell Cobb (Democratic) 63.78%; ▌Leonidas Franklin (Know Nothing) 36.22%
Georgia 7	David A. Reese	Whig	1853	Incumbent retired. Know Nothing gain.	▌ ✓ Nathaniel G. Foster (Know Nothing) 51.13%; ▌Linton Stephens (Democratic) 48.87%
Georgia 8	Alexander H. Stephens	Whig	1853	Incumbent re-elected as a Democrat. Democratic gain.	▌ ✓ Alexander H. Stephens (Democratic) 65.35%; ▌ C. A. Lafayette Lamar (Know Nothing) 34.65%

== Illinois ==
Illinois held elections on November 7, 1854.

District	Incumbent			This race	
District	Member	Party	First elected	Results	Candidates
Illinois 1	Elihu B. Washburne	Whig	1852	Incumbent re-elected as a Republican. Republican gain.	▌ ✓ Elihu B. Washburne (Republican) 69.33%; ▌William M. Jackson (Democratic) 22.99%; ▌E. P. Ferry (Anti-Nebraska Democratic) 7.67%
Illinois 2	John Wentworth	Democratic	1852	Incumbent retired. Republican gain.	▌ ✓ James H. Woodworth (Republican) 53.05%; ▌Robert S. Blackwell (Whig) 19.84%; ▌John B. Turner (Democratic) 19.48%; ▌Edward L. Mayo (Anti-Nebraska Democratic) 7.63%
Illinois 3	Jesse O. Norton	Whig	1852	Incumbent re-elected as a Republican. Republican gain.	▌ ✓ Jesse O. Norton (Republican) 62.76%; ▌John A. Drake (Democratic) 37.24%
Illinois 4	James Knox	Whig	1852	Incumbent re-elected.	▌ ✓ James Knox (Whig) 57.22%; ▌William McMurtry (Democratic) 42.79%
Illinois 5	William A. Richardson	Democratic	1847 (special)	Incumbent re-elected.	▌ ✓ William A. Richardson (Democratic) 52.38%; ▌Archibald Williams (Republican) 47.62%
Illinois 6	Richard Yates	Whig	1852	Incumbent lost re-election. Democratic gain.	▌ ✓ Thomas L. Harris (Democratic) 50.53%; ▌Richard Yates (Republican) 49.47%
Illinois 7	James C. Allen	Democratic	1852	Incumbent re-elected. Winner subsequently unseated.	▌ ✓ James C. Allen (Democratic) 50.003%; ▌William B. Archer (Republican) 49.997%
Illinois 8	William Henry Bissell	Independent; Democrat	1848	Incumbent retired. Anti-Nebraska Democratic gain.	▌ ✓ Lyman Trumbull (Anti-Nebraska Democratic) 58.17%; ▌Philip B. Fouke (Democratic) 38.98%; ▌Nathaniel Buckmaster (Unknown) 2.85%
Illinois 9	Willis Allen	Democratic	1850	Incumbent retired. Democratic hold.	▌ ✓ Samuel S. Marshall (Democratic) 62.10%; ▌L. Jay Turner (Republican) 21.27%; ▌DeWitt C. Barber (Unknown) 9.33%; ▌Almerin Grow (Unknown) 7.30%

== Indiana ==
Indiana held elections on October 10, 1854.

District	Incumbent			This race	
District	Member	Party	First elected	Results	Candidates
Indiana 1	Smith Miller	Democratic	1852	Incumbent re-elected.	▌ ✓ Smith Miller (Democratic) 52.15%; ▌Sam Hall (People's) 47.85%
Indiana 2	William Hayden English	Democratic	1852	Incumbent re-elected.	▌ ✓ William Hayden English (Democratic) 51.70%; ▌Thomas C. Slaught (People's) 48.30%
Indiana 3	Cyrus L. Dunham	Democratic	1849	Incumbent lost re-election. People's gain.	▌ ✓ George G. Dunn (People's) 54.53%; ▌Cyrus L. Dunham (Democratic) 45.47%
Indiana 4	Jim Lane	Democratic	1852	Incumbent retired. People's gain.	▌ ✓ William Cumback (People's) 51.92%; ▌William G. Holman (Democratic) 48.08%
Indiana 5	Samuel W. Parker	Whig	1851	Incumbent retired. People's gain.	▌ ✓ David P. Holloway (People's) 64.25%; ▌J. J. Buckles (Democratic) 35.75%
Indiana 6	Thomas A. Hendricks	Democratic	1851	Incumbent lost re-election. People's gain.	▌ ✓ Lucien Barbour (People's) 51.41%; ▌Thomas A. Hendricks (Democratic) 48.59%
Indiana 7	John G. Davis	Democratic	1851	Incumbent lost re-election. People's gain.	▌ ✓ Harvey D. Scott (People's) 52.58%; ▌John G. Davis (Democratic) 47.42%
Indiana 8	Daniel Mace	Democratic	1851	Incumbent re-elected to a new party. People's gain.	▌ ✓ Daniel Mace (People's) 56.92%; ▌James Davis (Democratic) 43.08%
Indiana 9	Norman Eddy	Democratic	1852	Incumbent lost re-election. People's gain.	▌ ✓ Schuyler Colfax (People's) 54.85%; ▌Norman Eddy (Democratic) 45.15%
Indiana 10	Ebenezer M. Chamberlain	Democratic	1852	Incumbent lost re-election. People's gain.	▌ ✓ Samuel Brenton (People's) 56.00%; ▌Ebenezer M. Chamberlain (Democratic) 44.00%
Indiana 11	Andrew J. Harlan	Democratic	1852	Incumbent lost re-election. People's gain.	▌ ✓ John U. Pettit (People's) 56.59%; ▌J. R. Slack (Democratic) 43.41%

== Iowa ==
Iowa held elections on August 7, 1854.

District	Incumbent			This race	
District	Member	Party	First elected	Results	Candidates
Iowa 1	Bernhart Henn	Democratic	1850	Incumbent retired. Democratic hold.	▌ ✓ Augustus Hall (Democratic) 50.27%; ▌R. L. Clark (Whig) 49.50%; ▌J. L. Ashbaugh (Unknown) 0.23%
Iowa 2	William Vandever	Whig	1852	Incumbent retired. Whig hold.	▌ ✓ James Thorington (Whig) 53.33%; ▌Stephen P. Hempstead (Democratic) 46.09%; ▌Augustus Hall (Unknown) 0.57%

== Kentucky ==
Kentucky held elections on August 6, 1855.

District	Incumbent			This race	
District	Member	Party	First elected	Results	Candidates
Kentucky 1	Linn Boyd	Democratic	1839	Incumbent retired. Democratic hold.	▌ ✓ Henry C. Burnett (Democratic) 62.03%; ▌W. G. Hughes (Know Nothing) 37.97%
Kentucky 2	Benjamin E. Grey	Whig	1851	Incumbent retired or lost re-election. (Note: The Biographical Directory of the United States Congress claims Grey ran unsuccessfully for re-election in 1855, but official records show no votes for him in the general election.: United States Congress. "1854–55 United States House of Representatives elections (id: G000453)". Biographical Directory of the United States Congress.); Know Nothing gain.	▌ ✓ John P. Campbell Jr. (Know Nothing) 55.29%; ▌Samuel Peyton (Democratic) 44.71%
Kentucky 3	Francis Bristow	Whig	1854 (special)	Incumbent retired. Know Nothing gain.	▌ ✓ Warner Underwood (Know Nothing) 56.88%; ▌James P. Bates (Democratic) 43.12%
Kentucky 4	James Chrisman	Democratic	1853	Incumbent retired. Democratic hold.	▌ ✓ Albert G. Talbott (Democratic) 50.06%; ▌Fountain T. Fox (Know Nothing) 49.94%
Kentucky 5	Clement S. Hill	Whig	1853	Incumbent retired. Democratic gain.	▌ ✓ Joshua Jewett (Democratic) 51.63%; ▌C. G. Wintersmith (Know Nothing) 48.37%
Kentucky 6	John Milton Elliott	Democratic	1853	Incumbent re-elected.	▌ ✓ John M. Elliott (Democratic) 54.80%; ▌George W. Dunlap (Know Nothing) 45.20%
Kentucky 7	William Preston	Whig	1852 (special)	Incumbent lost re-election as a Democrat. Know Nothing gain.	▌ ✓ Humphrey Marshall (Know Nothing) 61.29%; ▌William Preston (Democratic) 38.71%
Kentucky 8	John C. Breckinridge	Democratic	1851	Incumbent retired. Know Nothing gain.	▌ ✓ Alexander K. Marshall (Know Nothing) 55.98%; ▌James O. Harrison (Democratic) 44.02%
Kentucky 9	Leander Cox	Whig	1853	Incumbent re-elected as a Know Nothing. Know Nothing gain.	▌ ✓ Leander Cox (Know Nothing) 55.06%; ▌Richard H. Stanton (Democratic) 44.94%
Kentucky 9	Richard H. Stanton; Redistricted from the 10th district	Democratic	1849	Incumbent lost re-election. Democratic loss.	▌ ✓ Leander Cox (Know Nothing) 55.06%; ▌Richard H. Stanton (Democratic) 44.94%
Kentucky 10	Vacant			Incumbent redistricted to the 9th district. Know Nothing gain.	▌ ✓ Samuel F. Swope (Know Nothing) 51.72%; ▌Henry C. Harris (Democratic) 48.28%

== Louisiana ==
Louisiana held elections on November 5, 1855.

District	Incumbent			This race	
District	Member	Party	First elected	Results	Candidates
Louisiana 1	William Dunbar	Democratic	1852	Incumbent retired. Know Nothing gain.	▌ ✓ George Eustis Jr. (Know Nothing) 53.40%; ▌Albert Fabre (Democratic) 46.60%
Louisiana 2	Theodore G. Hunt	Whig	1852	Incumbent lost re-election. Democratic gain.	▌ ✓ Miles Taylor (Democratic) 51.54%; ▌Theodore G. Hunt (Know Nothing) 48.46%
Louisiana 3	John Perkins Jr.	Democratic	1852	Incumbent retired. Democratic hold.	▌ ✓ Thomas G. Davidson (Democratic) 50.62%; ▌Preston Pond Jr. (Know Nothing) 49.38%
Louisiana 4	Roland Jones	Democratic	1852	Incumbent retired. Democratic hold.	▌ ✓ John M. Sandidge (Democratic) 58.05%; ▌William B. Lewis (Know Nothing) 41.95%

== Maine ==
Maine held elections on September 11, 1854.

District	Incumbent			This race	
District	Member	Party	First elected	Results	Candidates
Maine 1	Moses Macdonald	Democratic	1850	Incumbent retired. Republican gain.	▌ ✓ John M. Wood (Republican) 59.36%; ▌Samuel Wells (Democratic) 39.90%; ▌Lorenzo D. Wilkinson (Unknown) 0.73%
Maine 2	Samuel Mayall	Democratic	1852	Incumbent retired. Republican gain.	▌ ✓ John J. Perry (Republican) 56.88%; ▌William K. Kimball (Democratic) 42.46%; ▌Charles J. Gilman (Unknown) 0.65%
Maine 3	E. Wilder Farley	Whig	1852	Incumbent lost re-election. Republican gain.	▌ ✓ Ebenezer Knowlton (Republican) 43.94%; ▌Jonathan G. Dickerson (Democratic) 30.78%; ▌E. Wilder Farley (Whig) 25.28%
Maine 4	Samuel P. Benson	Whig	1852	Incumbent re-elected as a Republican. Republican gain.	▌ ✓ Samuel P. Benson (Republican) 77.12%; ▌George Rogers (Democratic) 22.88%
Maine 5	Israel Washburn Jr.	Whig	1850	Incumbent re-elected as a Republican. Republican gain.	▌ ✓ Israel Washburn Jr. (Republican) 62.88%; ▌Samuel H. Blake (Democratic) 37.12%
Maine 6	Thomas J. D. Fuller	Democratic	1848	Incumbent re-elected.	▌ ✓ Thomas J. D. Fuller (Democratic) 41.29%; ▌James A. Milliken (Republican) 37.73%; ▌Noah Smith (Whig) 20.98%

== Maryland ==
Maryland held elections on November 6, 1865.

District	Incumbent			This race	
District	Member	Party	First elected	Results	Candidates
Maryland 1	John Rankin Franklin	Whig	1853	Incumbent retired. Democratic gain.	▌ ✓ James A. Stewart (Democratic) 51.27%; ▌John Dennis (Know Nothing) 48.73%
Maryland 2	Jacob Shower	Democratic	1853	Incumbent lost re-election. Know Nothing gain.	▌ ✓ James B. Ricaud (Know Nothing) 56.58%; ▌Jacob Shower (Democratic) 43.42%
Maryland 3	Joshua Van Sant	Democratic	1853	Incumbent lost re-election. Know Nothing gain.	▌ ✓ J. Morrison Harris (Know Nothing) 50.21%; ▌Joshua Van Sant (Democratic) 49.79%
Maryland 4	William T. Hamilton	Democratic	1849	Incumbent lost re-election. Know Nothing gain.	▌ ✓ Henry W. Davis (Know Nothing) 51.60%; ▌William T. Hamilton (Democratic) 48.40%
Maryland 5	Henry May	Democratic	1853	Incumbent lost re-election. Know Nothing gain.	▌ ✓ Henry W. Hoffman (Know Nothing) 52.36%; ▌Henry May (Democratic) 47.64%
Maryland 6	Augustus Rhodes Sollers	Whig	1853	Incumbent retired. Democratic gain.	▌ ✓ Thomas F. Bowie (Democratic) 53.93%; ▌William Watkins (Know Nothing) 46.07%

== Massachusetts ==
Massachusetts held elections on November 12, 1854.

District	Incumbent			This race	
District	Member	Party	First elected	Results	Candidates
Massachusetts 1	Thomas D. Eliot	Whig	1854 (special)	Incumbent lost re-election. Know Nothing gain.	▌ ✓ Robert B. Hall (Know Nothing) 63.70%; ▌Thomas D. Eliot (Whig) 26.63%; ▌Abraham H. Howland (Democratic) 9.66%
Massachusetts 2	Samuel L. Crocker	Whig	1852	Incumbent lost re-election. Know Nothing gain.	▌ ✓ James Buffinton (Know Nothing) 68.25%; ▌Samuel L. Crocker (Whig) 16.20%; ▌Charles R. Vickery (Democratic) 9.00%; ▌Gersham B. Weston (Free Soil) 6.55%
Massachusetts 3	J. Wiley Edmands	Whig	1852	Incumbent retired. Know Nothing gain.	▌ ✓ William S. Damrell (Know Nothing) 74.76%; ▌Nathaniel F. Safford (Whig) 16.67%; ▌Edward Avery (Democratic) 5.38%; ▌Arthur W. Austin (Unknown) 3.19%
Massachusetts 4	Samuel H. Walley	Whig	1852	Incumbent lost re-election. Know Nothing gain.	▌ ✓ Linus B. Comins (Know Nothing) 57.45%; ▌Samuel H. Walley (Whig) 32.00%; ▌Samuel R. Skinner (Democratic) 10.55%
Massachusetts 5	William Appleton	Whig	1850	Incumbent lost re-election. Know Nothing gain.	▌ ✓ Anson Burlingame (Know Nothing) 61.64%; ▌William Appleton (Whig) 32.12%; ▌William Parmenter (Democratic) 6.24%
Massachusetts 6	Charles W. Upham	Whig	1852	Incumbent lost re-election. Know Nothing gain.	▌ ✓ Timothy Davis (Know Nothing) 65.39%; ▌Charles W. Upham (Whig) 28.44%; ▌Nathaniel J. Lord (Democratic) 5.57%; ▌George Hood (Unknown) 0.59%
Massachusetts 7	Nathaniel P. Banks	Democratic	1852	Incumbent re-elected as a Know Nothing. Know Nothing gain.	▌ ✓ Nathaniel P. Banks (Know Nothing) 73.22%; ▌Luther Bell (Whig) 20.35%; ▌Bowen Buckman (Democratic) 6.01%; Scattering 0.43%
Massachusetts 8	Tappan Wentworth	Whig	1852	Incumbent lost re-election. Know Nothing gain.	▌ ✓ Chauncey L. Knapp (Know Nothing) 62.80%; ▌Tappan Wentworth (Whig) 31.88%; ▌Daniel Needham (Democratic) 5.32%
Massachusetts 9	Alexander DeWitt	Free Soil	1852	Incumbent re-elected as a Know Nothing. Know Nothing gain.	▌ ✓ Alexander DeWitt (Know Nothing) 76.97%; ▌Isaac Davis (Democratic) 13.36%; ▌Ira M. Barton (Whig) 7.45%; ▌Alfred Mowrey (Unknown) 1.42%; ▌William P. Marble (Unknown) 0.46%; Scattering 0.34%
Massachusetts 10	Edward Dickinson	Whig	1852	Incumbent lost re-election. Know Nothing gain.	▌ ✓ Henry Morris (Know Nothing) 65.35%; ▌Edward Dickinson (Whig) 23.33%; ▌Stephen C. Bemis (Democratic) 11.32%
Massachusetts 11	John Z. Goodrich	Whig	1852	Incumbent lost re-election. Know Nothing gain.	▌ ✓ Mark Trafton (Know Nothing) 50.52%; ▌John Z. Goodrich (Whig) 30.42%; ▌Whiting Griswold (Democratic) 19.06%

== Michigan ==
Michigan held elections on November 7, 1854.

District	Incumbent			This race	
District	Member	Party	First elected	Results	Candidates
Michigan 1	David Stuart	Democratic	1852	Incumbent lost re-election. Republican gain.	▌ ✓ William A. Howard (Republican) 53.10%; ▌David Stuart (Democratic) 46.90%
Michigan 2	David A. Noble	Democratic	1852	Incumbent lost re-election. Republican gain.	▌ ✓ Henry Waldron (Republican) 57.67%; ▌David A. Noble (Democratic) 42.33%
Michigan 3	Samuel Clark	Democratic	1852	Incumbent lost re-election. Republican gain.	▌ ✓ David S. Walbridge (Republican) 55.83%; ▌Samuel Clark (Democratic) 44.17%
Michigan 4	Hestor L. Stevens	Democratic	1852	Incumbent retired. Democratic hold.	▌ ✓ George W. Peck (Democratic) 53.25%; ▌Moses Wisner (Republican) 46.75%

== Mississippi ==
Mississippi held elections on November 5–6, 1855.

District	Incumbent			This race	
District	Member	Party	First elected	Results	Candidates
Mississippi 1	Daniel B. Wright	Democratic	1853	Incumbent re-elected.	▌ ✓ Daniel B. Wright (Democratic) 55.53%; ▌J. H. Taylor (Know Nothing) 44.47%
Mississippi 2	William S. Barry	Democratic	1853	Incumbent retired. Democratic hold.	▌ ✓ Hendley S. Bennett (Democratic) 51.64%; ▌L. E. Houston (Know Nothing) 48.36%
Mississippi 3	William Barksdale; Redistricted from the at-large district	Democratic	1853	Incumbent re-elected.	▌ ✓ William Barksdale (Democratic) 55.48%; ▌Joseph B. Cobb (Know Nothing) 44.52%
Mississippi 4	Otho R. Singleton; Redistricted from the 3rd district	Democratic	1853	Incumbent lost re-election. Know Nothing gain.	▌ ✓ William A. Lake (Know Nothing) 50.76%; ▌Otho R. Singleton (Democratic) 49.24%
Mississippi 5	None (new seat)			New seat. Democratic gain.	▌ ✓ John A. Quitman (Democratic) 59.31%; ▌Giles M. Hillyer (Know Nothing) 40.69%

== Missouri ==
Missouri held elections on August 7, 1854.

District	Incumbent			This race	
District	Member	Party	First elected	Results	Candidates
Missouri 1	Thomas H. Benton	Democratic	1852	Incumbent lost re-election. Whig gain.	▌ ✓ Luther M. Kennett (Whig) 52.45%; ▌Thomas H. Benton (Benton Democratic) 44.39%; ▌Trusten Polk (Anti-Benton Democratic) 3.17%
Missouri 2	Alfred W. Lamb	Democratic	1852	Incumbent retired. Whig gain.	▌ ✓ Gilchrist Porter (Whig) 54.29%; ▌Tully Cornick (Benton Democratic) 45.71%
Missouri 3	James J. Lindley	Whig	1852	Incumbent re-elected.	▌ ✓ James J. Lindley (Whig) 52.46%; ▌Augustus W. Fournoy (Democratic) 47.54%
Missouri 4	Mordecai Oliver	Whig	1852	Incumbent re-elected.	▌ ✓ Mordecai Oliver (Whig) 41.95%; ▌S. L. Leonard (Anti-Benton Democratic) 34.21%; ▌Shelton J. Howe (Benton Democratic) 19.08%; ▌J. F. Pitt (Independent Whig) 4.76%
Missouri 5	John G. Miller	Whig	1850	Incumbent re-elected.	▌ ✓ John G. Miller (Whig) 46.16%; ▌Thomas L. Price (Benton Democratic) 35.43%; ▌Warwick Hough (Anti-Benton Democratic) 18.40%
Missouri 6	John S. Phelps	Democratic	1844	Incumbent re-elected.	▌ ✓ John S. Phelps (Anti-Benton Democratic) 51.07%; ▌Waldo P. Johnson (Benton Democratic) 48.93%
Missouri 7	Samuel Caruthers	Whig	1852	Incumbent re-elected.	▌ ✓ Samuel Caruthers (Whig) 58.85%; ▌Charles Jones (Democratic) 41.15%

== New Hampshire ==
New Hampshire held elections on March 13, 1855.

District	Incumbent			This race	
District	Member	Party	First elected	Results	Candidates
New Hampshire 1	George W. Kittredge	Democratic	1853	Incumbent lost re-election. Know Nothing gain.	▌ ✓ James Pike (Know Nothing) 56.29%; ▌George W. Kittredge (Democratic) 43.71%
New Hampshire 2	George W. Morrison	Democratic	1853	Incumbent lost re-election. Know Nothing gain.	▌ ✓ Mason Tappan (Know Nothing) 58.37%; ▌George W. Morrison (Democratic) 41.63%
New Hampshire 3	Harry Hibbard	Democratic	1849	Incumbent retired. Know Nothing gain.	▌ ✓ Aaron H. Cragin (Know Nothing) 58.40%; ▌William P. Wheeler (Democratic) 41.60%

== New Jersey ==
New Jersey held elections on November 7, 1854.

District	Incumbent			This race	
District	Member	Party	First elected	Results	Candidates
New Jersey 1	Nathan T. Stratton	Democratic	1850	Incumbent retired. Whig gain.	▌ ✓ Isaiah D. Clawson (Whig) 42.94%; ▌Thomas W. Mulford (Democratic) 30.02%; ▌John W. Hazelton (Temperance) 27.05%
New Jersey 2	Charles Skelton	Democratic	1850	Incumbent retired. Whig gain.	▌ ✓ George R. Robbins (Whig) 57.56%; ▌Nathaniel S. Rue (Democratic) 42.44%
New Jersey 3	Samuel Lilly	Democratic	1852	Incumbent lost re-election. Whig gain.	▌ ✓ James Bishop (Whig) 54.35%; ▌Samuel Lilly (Democratic) 45.65%
New Jersey 4	George Vail	Democratic	1852	Incumbent re-elected.	▌ ✓ George Vail (Democratic) 51.65%; ▌Peter Osborne (Independent Anti-Nebraska) 48.35%
New Jersey 5	Alexander C. M. Pennington	Whig	1852	Incumbent re-elected.	▌ ✓ Alexander C. M. Pennington (Whig) 54.42%; ▌John Darcy (Democratic) 45.58%

== New York ==
New York held elections on November 7, 1854.

District	Incumbent			This race	
District	Member	Party	First elected	Results	Candidates
New York 1	James Maurice	Democratic	1852	Incumbent retired. Know Nothing gain.	▌ ✓ William Valk (Know Nothing) 30.97%; ▌Daniel B. Allen (Hard Shell Democratic) 20.34%; ▌Harvey W. Vail (Whig) 19.67%; ▌Frederick Lord (Soft Shell Democratic) 16.36%; ▌Gabriel P. Disosway (Temperance) 12.05%; Scattering 0.62%
New York 2	Thomas W. Cumming	Democratic	1852	Incumbent retired. Whig gain.	▌ ✓ James S. T. Stranahan (Whig) 50.98%; ▌George Taylor (Democratic) 49.02%
New York 3	Hiram Walbridge	Democratic	1852	Incumbent retired. Whig gain.	▌ ✓ Guy R. Pelton (Whig; Know Nothing) 49.06%; ▌George D. Clinton (Hard Shell Democratic) 30.70%; ▌William Miner (Soft Shell Democratic) 20.24%
New York 4	Michael Walsh	Democratic	1852	Incumbent lost re-election. Democratic hold.	▌ ✓ John Kelly (Soft Shell Democratic) 40.54%; ▌Michael Walsh (Hard Shell Democratic) 40.30%; ▌Sanford L. Macomber (Whig) 10.89%; ▌John W. Boyce (Know Nothing; Independent Whig) 8.27%
New York 5	William M. Tweed	Democratic	1852	Incumbent retired. Know Nothing gain.	▌ ✓ Thomas R. Whitney (Know Nothing; Whig) 30.86%; ▌George H. Andrews (Whig) 25.71%; ▌Phillip Hamilton (Hard Shell Democratic) 25.26%; ▌Abraham J. Berry (Soft Shell Democratic) 18.16%
New York 6	John Wheeler	Democratic	1852	Incumbent re-elected.	▌ ✓ John Wheeler (Hard Shell Democratic) 46.30%; ▌John M. Murphy (Soft Shell Democratic) 22.99%; ▌Charles H. Marshall (Whig) 20.47%; ▌Charles D. Mead (Independent Democrat) 10.24%
New York 7	William A. Walker	Democratic	1852	Incumbent retired. Whig gain.	▌ ✓ Thomas Child Jr. (Whig; Know Nothing) 56.29%; ▌William D. Kennedy (Democratic) 43.71%
New York 8	Francis B. Cutting	Democratic	1852	Incumbent retired. Whig gain.	▌ ✓ Abram Wakeman (Whig) 51.87%; ▌James L. Curtis (Hard Shell Democratic) 32.52%; ▌Edward B. Fellows (Soft Shell Democratic) 15.61%
New York 9	Jared V. Peck	Democratic	1852	Incumbent lost re-election. Know Nothing gain.	▌ ✓ Bayard Clarke (Know Nothing; Whig) 59.56%; ▌Benjamin Brandreth (Hard Shell Democratic) 17.64%; ▌James R. Whiting (Hard Shell Democratic) 15.04%; ▌Jared V. Peck (Anti-Nebraska Democratic) 2.95%; ▌Benjamin V. Bailey (Independent) 2.82%
New York 10	William Murray	Democratic	1850	Incumbent retired. Whig gain.	▌ ✓ Ambrose S. Murray (Whig) 44.05%; ▌Charles S. Woodworth (Hard Shell Democratic) 38.59%; ▌Jonathan Stratton (Soft Shell Democratic) 17.36%
New York 11	Theodoric R. Westbrook	Democratic	1852	Incumbent retired. Whig gain.	▌ ✓ Rufus H. King (Whig) 62.98%; ▌Elisha P. Strong (Democratic) 37.02%
New York 12	Isaac Teller	Whig	1854 (special)	Incumbent retired. Whig hold.	▌ ✓ Killian Miller (Whig) 51.07%; ▌Hugh McClelland (Soft Shell Democratic) 33.78%; ▌William H. Wilson (Hard Shell Democratic) 15.16%
New York 13	Russell Sage	Whig	1852	Incumbent re-elected.	▌ ✓ Russell Sage (Whig) 63.22%; ▌Henry A. Clum (Soft Shell Democratic) 18.86%; ▌Alanson Cook (Hard Shell Democratic) 17.92%
New York 14	Rufus W. Peckham	Democratic	1852	Incumbent retired. Whig gain.	▌ ✓ Samuel Dickson (Whig) 30.91%; ▌John W. Harcourt (Know Nothing) 28.45%; ▌John V. L. Pruyn (Soft Shell Democratic) 25.61%; ▌Hamilton David (Hard Shell Democratic) 15.03%
New York 15	Charles Hughes	Democratic	1852	Incumbent lost re-election. Whig gain.	▌ ✓ Edward Dodd (Whig) 37.57%; ▌Orville Clark (Hard Shell Democratic) 35.34%; ▌Charles Hughes (Soft Shell Democratic) 13.73%; ▌James M. Andrews (Temperance) 13.36%
New York 16	George A. Simmons	Whig	1852	Incumbent re-elected.	▌ ✓ George A. Simmons (Whig) 48.18%; ▌Jerome B. Bailey (Know Nothing) 27.06%; ▌Gorton T. Thomas (Soft Shell Democratic) 15.02%; ▌Joseph R. Flanders (Hard Shell Democratic) 9.75%
New York 17	Bishop Perkins	Democratic	1852	Incumbent retired. Democratic hold.	▌ ✓ Francis E. Spinner (Soft Shell Democratic) 50.62%; ▌Henry P. Alexander (Whig) 36.00%; ▌Nathaniel S. Benton (Hard Shell Democratic) 13.38%
New York 18	Peter Rowe	Democratic	1852	Incumbent retired. Whig gain.	▌ ✓ Thomas R. Horton (Whig) 51.32%; ▌Isaac Jackson (Democratic) 48.68%
New York 19	George W. Chase	Whig	1852	Incumbent retired. Whig hold.	▌ ✓ Jonas A. Hughston (Whig) 43.25%; ▌Lewis R. Palmer (Soft Shell Democratic) 41.33%; ▌William B. Hawes (Free Soil) 8.59%; ▌Hezekiah Sturgis (Hard Shell Democratic) 6.84%
New York 20	Orsamus B. Matteson	Whig	1848; 1850 (retired); 1852	Incumbent re-elected.	▌ ✓ Orsamus B. Matteson (Whig) 38.16%; ▌William C. Johnson (Soft Shell Democratic) 30.40%; ▌Benjamin N. Huntington (Independent Whig) 27.98%; ▌Nasman W. Moore (Soft Shell Democratic) 3.46%
New York 21	Henry Bennett	Whig	1848	Incumbent re-elected.	▌ ✓ Henry Bennett (Whig) 56.03%; ▌Edward Tompkins (Hard Shell Democratic) 32.04%; ▌Oliver C. Crocker (Soft Shell Democratic) 11.93%
New York 22	Gerrit Smith	Free Soil	1852	Incumbent resigned August 7, 1854. Whig gain.	▌ ✓ Andrew Z. McCarty (Whig) 32.19%; ▌Leander Babcock (Soft Shell Democratic) 27.50%; ▌Charles G. Case (Free Soil) 21.24%; ▌William Lewis (Hard Shell Democratic) 19.08%
New York 23	Caleb Lyon	Independent	1852	Incumbent retired. Whig gain.	▌ ✓ William A. Gilbert (Whig) 46.35%; ▌Willard Ives (Soft Shell Democratic) 41.86%; ▌Lysander Brown (Hard Shell Democratic) 11.22%; ▌Reuben Goodale (Radical Abolitionist) 0.58%
New York 24	Daniel T. Jones	Democratic	1850	Incumbent retired. Whig gain.	▌ ✓ Amos P. Granger (Whig) 37.50%; ▌Thomas G. Alvord (Soft Shell Democratic) 32.08%; ▌B. Davis Noxon (Know Nothing) 26.62%; ▌Sanford Parker (Hard Shell Democratic) 3.80%
New York 25	Edwin B. Morgan	Whig	1850	Incumbent re-elected.	▌ ✓ Edwin B. Morgan (Whig) 48.35%; ▌George H. Middleton (Soft Shell Democratic) 43.50%; ▌William F. Aldrich (Hard Shell Democratic) 8.15%
New York 26	Andrew Oliver	Democratic	1852	Incumbent re-elected.	▌ ✓ Andrew Oliver (Soft Shell Democratic) 47.74%; ▌James M. Seeley (Whig) 37.06%; ▌Thomas M. Howell (Hard Shell Democratic) 15.20%
New York 27	John J. Taylor	Democratic	1852	Incumbent retired. Whig gain.	▌ ✓ John M. Parker (Whig) 61.27%; ▌John G. McDowell (Soft Shell Democratic) 26.45%; ▌Stephen B. Cushing (Hard Shell Democratic) 12.28%
New York 28	George Hastings	Democratic	1852	Incumbent lost re-election. Whig gain.	▌ ✓ William H. Kelsey (Whig) 68.90%; ▌George Hastings (Soft Shell Democratic) 27.72%; ▌Leman Gibbs (Hard Shell Democratic) 3.38%
New York 29	Davis Carpenter	Whig	1852	Incumbent lost re-election. Democratic gain.	▌ ✓ John Williams (D-SS; KN) 47.94%; ▌Davis Carpenter (Whig) 36.13%; ▌Joseph Sibley (Hard Shell Democratic) 15.94%
New York 30	Benjamin Pringle	Whig	1852	Incumbent re-elected.	▌ ✓ Benjamin Pringle (Whig) 57.59%; ▌Albert P. Laning (Soft Shell Democratic) 23.62%; ▌Charles W. Belden (Hard Shell Democratic) 14.59%; ▌Nathan V. Hull (Free Soil) 4.19%
New York 31	Thomas T. Flagler	Whig	1852	Incumbent re-elected.	▌ ✓ Thomas T. Flagler (Whig) 76.63%; ▌Alden S. Blair (Democratic) 13.12%; ▌Edward J. Chase (Free Soil) 10.25%
New York 32	Solomon G. Haven	Whig	1850	Incumbent re-elected.	▌ ✓ Solomon G. Haven (Whig) 59.21%; ▌Israel T. Hatch (Soft Shell Democratic) 35.15%; ▌Nelson Randall (Hard Shell Democratic) 5.64%
New York 33	Reuben Fenton	Democratic	1852	Incumbent lost re-election. Know Nothing gain.	▌ ✓ Francis S. Edwards (Know Nothing) 55.49%; ▌Reuben Fenton (Soft Shell Democratic) 42.47%; ▌Ebenezer A. Lester (Hard Shell Democratic) 1.64%; ▌George W. Patterson (Whig) 0.40%

== North Carolina ==
North Carolina held elections on August 9, 1855.

District	Incumbent			This race	
District	Member	Party	First elected	Results	Candidates
North Carolina 1	Henry M. Shaw	Democratic	1853	Incumbent lost re-election. Know Nothing gain.	▌ ✓ Robert Treat Paine (Know Nothing) 51.71%; ▌Henry M. Shaw (Democratic) 48.29%
North Carolina 2	Thomas Hart Ruffin	Democratic	1853	Incumbent re-elected.	▌ ✓ Thomas Hart Ruffin (Democratic) 66.05%; ▌Thomas J. Latham (Know Nothing) 33.95%
North Carolina 3	William S. Ashe	Democratic	1849	Incumbent retired. Democratic hold.	▌ ✓ Warren Winslow (Democratic) 54.94%; ▌David Reid (Know Nothing) 45.06%
North Carolina 4	Sion H. Rogers	Whig	1853	Incumbent retired. Democratic gain.	▌ ✓ Lawrence O'Bryan Branch (Democratic) 61.67%; ▌James B. Shepard (Know Nothing) 38.33%
North Carolina 5	John Kerr Jr.	Whig	1853	Incumbent lost re-election. Know Nothing gain.	▌ ✓ Edwin Godwin Reade (Know Nothing) 65.28%; ▌John Kerr Jr. (Whig) 34.72%
North Carolina 6	Richard C. Puryear	Whig	1853	Incumbent re-elected as a Know Nothing. Know Nothing gain.	▌ ✓ Richard C. Puryear (Know Nothing) 51.45%; ▌Alfred Moore Scales (Democratic) 48.55%
North Carolina 7	F. Burton Craige	Democratic	1853	Incumbent re-elected.	▌ ✓ F. Burton Craige (Democratic) 62.17%; ▌Samuel N. Stowe (Know Nothing) 37.83%
North Carolina 8	Thomas L. Clingman	Democratic	1843; 1845 (lost); 1847	Incumbent re-elected.	▌ ✓ Thomas L. Clingman (Democratic) 55.10%; ▌Leander B. Carmichael (Know Nothing) 44.90%

== Ohio ==
Ohio held elections on October 10, 1854.

District	Incumbent			This race	
District	Member	Party	First elected	Results	Candidates
Ohio 1	David T. Disney	Democratic	1848	Incumbent retired. Anti-Nebraska gain.	▌ ✓ Timothy C. Day (Anti-Nebraska) 63.46%; ▌George H. Pendleton (Democratic) 36.54%
Ohio 2	John Scott Harrison	Whig	1852	Incumbent re-elected as Anti-Nebraska. Anti-Nebraska gain.	▌ ✓ John Scott Harrison (Anti-Nebraska) 66.02%; ▌William S. Groesbeck (Democratic) 33.98%
Ohio 3	Lewis D. Campbell	Whig	1848	Incumbent re-elected as Anti-Nebraska. Anti-Nebraska gain.	▌ ✓ Lewis D. Campbell (Anti-Nebraska) 58.25%; ▌Clement Vallandigham (Democratic) 41.75%
Ohio 4	Matthias H. Nichols	Democratic	1852	Incumbent re-elected as Anti-Nebraska. Anti-Nebraska gain.	▌ ✓ Matthias H. Nichols (Anti-Nebraska) 70.19%; ▌G. V. Dorsey (Democratic) 29.81%
Ohio 5	Alfred Edgerton	Democratic	1850	Incumbent retired. Anti-Nebraska gain.	▌ ✓ Richard Mott (Anti-Nebraska) 61.62%; ▌Henry S. Cowager (Democratic) 38.38%
Ohio 6	Andrew Ellison	Democratic	1852	Incumbent lost re-election. Anti-Nebraska gain.	▌ ✓ Jonas R. Emrie (Anti-Nebraska) 65.29%; ▌Andrew Ellison (Democratic) 34.71%
Ohio 7	Aaron Harlan	Whig	1852	Incumbent re-elected as Anti-Nebraska. Anti-Nebraska gain.	▌ ✓ Aaron Harlan (Anti-Nebraska) 81.14%; ▌Benjamin B. Hinkson (Democratic) 18.86%
Ohio 8	Moses Bledso Corwin	Whig	1852	Incumbent retired. Anti-Nebraska gain.	▌ ✓ Benjamin Stanton (Anti-Nebraska) 75.84%; ▌Enoch G. Dial (Democratic) 23.10%; ▌J. Newell (Unknown) 1.06%
Ohio 9	Frederick W. Green	Democratic	1850	Incumbent retired. Anti-Nebraska gain.	▌ ✓ Cooper K. Watson (Anti-Nebraska) 59.92%; ▌Josiah S. Plants (Democratic) 40.08%
Ohio 10	John L. Taylor	Democratic	1846	Incumbent retired. Anti-Nebraska gain.	▌ ✓ Oscar F. Moore (Anti-Nebraska) 65.32%; ▌James W. Davis (Democratic) 34.68%
Ohio 11	Thomas Ritchey	Democratic	1852	Incumbent retired. Anti-Nebraska gain.	▌ ✓ Valentine B. Horton (Anti-Nebraska) 58.70%; ▌Lot L. Smith (Democratic) 41.30%
Ohio 12	Edson B. Olds	Democratic	1848	Incumbent lost re-election. Anti-Nebraska gain.	▌ ✓ Samuel Galloway (Anti-Nebraska) 60.28%; ▌Edson B. Olds (Democratic) 39.72%
Ohio 13	William D. Lindsley	Democratic	1852	Incumbent lost re-election. Anti-Nebraska gain.	▌ ✓ John Sherman (Anti-Nebraska) 59.79%; ▌William D. Lindsley (Democratic) 40.21%
Ohio 14	Harvey H. Johnson	Democratic	1852	Incumbent retired. Anti-Nebraska gain.	▌ ✓ Philemon Bliss (Anti-Nebraska) 59.26%; ▌Harvey H. Johnson (Democratic) 40.74%
Ohio 15	William R. Sapp	Whig	1852	Incumbent re-elected as Anti-Nebraska. Anti-Nebraska gain.	▌ ✓ William R. Sapp (Anti-Nebraska) 58.99%; ▌William Dunbar (Democratic) 41.01%
Ohio 16	Edward Ball	Whig	1852	Incumbent re-elected as Anti-Nebraska. Anti-Nebraska gain.	▌ ✓ Edward Ball (Anti-Nebraska) 58.89%; ▌William Galligher (Democratic) 41.11%
Ohio 17	Wilson Shannon	Democratic	1852	Incumbent retired. Anti-Nebraska gain.	▌ ✓ Charles J. Albright (Anti-Nebraska) 58.07%; ▌Daniel H. Wire (Democratic) 41.93%
Ohio 18	George Bliss	Democratic	1852	Incumbent retired. Anti-Nebraska gain.	▌ ✓ Benjamin F. Leiter (Anti-Nebraska) 63.36%; ▌Ebenezer Spaulding (Democratic) 36.64%
Ohio 19	Edward Wade	Free Soil	1852	Incumbent re-elected as Anti-Nebraska. Anti-Nebraska gain.	▌ ✓ Edward Wade (Anti-Nebraska) 71.07%; ▌Eli T. Wilder (Democratic) 28.42%; ▌Irad Kelly (Unknown) 0.50%
Ohio 20	Joshua Reed Giddings	Free Soil	1843	Incumbent re-elected as Anti-Nebraska. Anti-Nebraska gain.	▌ ✓ Joshua Reed Giddings (Anti-Nebraska) 64.83%; ▌Eusebius Lee (Democratic) 35.17%
Ohio 21	Andrew Stuart	Democratic	1848	Incumbent lost re-election. Anti-Nebraska gain.	▌ ✓ John Bingham (Anti-Nebraska) 65.31%; ▌Andrew Stuart (Democratic) 34.69%

== Pennsylvania ==
Pennsylvania held elections on October 10, 1854.

District	Incumbent			This race	
District	Member	Party	First elected	Results	Candidates
Pennsylvania 1	Thomas B. Florence	Democratic	1848	Incumbent re-elected.	▌ ✓ Thomas B. Florence (Democratic) 51.77%; ▌Edward J. Morris (Whig) 48.23%
Pennsylvania 2	Joseph R. Chandler	Whig	1848	Incumbent lost re-election. Whig hold.	▌ ✓ Job R. Tyson (Whig) 54.63%; ▌John Hamilton (Democratic) 33.82%; ▌Joseph R. Chandler (Independent Whig) 11.56%
Pennsylvania 3	John Robbins	Democratic	1848	Incumbent retired. Whig gain.	▌ ✓ William Millward (Whig) 51.59%; ▌James Landy (Democratic) 48.41%
Pennsylvania 4	William Henry Witte	Democratic	1852	Incumbent retired. Know Nothing gain.	▌ ✓ Jacob Broom (Know Nothing) 49.63%; ▌Henry Myer Phillips (Democratic) 44.08%; ▌John Lambert (Whig) 6.29%
Pennsylvania 5	John McNair	Democratic	1850	Incumbent retired. Democratic hold.	▌ ✓ John Cadwalader (Democratic) 50.03%; ▌Nathan A. Jones (Whig) 49.97%
Pennsylvania 6	William Everhart	Whig	1852	Incumbent retired. Democratic gain.	▌ ✓ John Hickman (Democratic) 58.97%; ▌John M. Broomall (Whig) 41.03%
Pennsylvania 7	Samuel A. Bridges	Democratic	1852	Incumbent lost re-election. Whig gain.	▌ ✓ Samuel C. Bradshaw (Whig) 51.03%; ▌Samuel A. Bridges (Democratic) 48.97%
Pennsylvania 8	J. Glancy Jones	Democratic	1854	Incumbent re-elected.	▌ ✓ J. Glancy Jones (Democratic) 59.77%; ▌John C. Myers (Whig) 40.23%
Pennsylvania 9	Isaac E. Hiester	Whig	1852	Incumbent lost re-election. Independent Whig gain.	▌ ✓ Anthony E. Roberts (Independent Whig) 39.37%; ▌Isaac E. Hiester (Whig) 33.79%; ▌Joseph S. Lefevre (Democratic) 26.84%
Pennsylvania 10	Ner Middleswarth	Whig	1852	Incumbent retired. Whig hold.	▌ ✓ John C. Kunkel (Whig) 55.99%; ▌Amos Boughter (Democratic) 43.01%; ▌George A. Seiler (Unknown) 0.99%
Pennsylvania 11	Christian M. Straub	Democratic	1852	Incumbent retired. Whig gain.	▌ ✓ James H. Campbell (Whig) 38.87%; ▌William L. Dewart (Democratic) 36.68%; ▌Joseph W. Cake (Democratic) 21.90%; ▌Kimber Klever (Know Nothing) 2.56%
Pennsylvania 12	Hendrick B. Wright	Democratic	1852	Incumbent lost re-election. Whig gain.	▌ ✓ Henry M. Fuller (Whig) 56.26%; ▌Hendrick B. Wright (Democratic) 43.74%
Pennsylvania 13	Asa Packer	Democratic	1852	Incumbent re-elected.	▌ ✓ Asa Packer (Democratic) 58.67%; ▌Edward F. Stewart (Whig) 41.33%
Pennsylvania 14	Galusha A. Grow	Democratic	1850	Incumbent re-elected as a Free Soil Democrat. Free Soil Democratic gain.	▌ ✓ Galusha A. Grow (Free Soil Democratic) 95.22%; ▌Jim Grow (Unknown) 4.56%; ▌Olin L. Hawley (Unknown) 0.23%
Pennsylvania 15	James Gamble	Democratic	1850	Incumbent retired. Whig gain.	▌ ✓ John J. Pearce (Whig) 55.90%; ▌Allison White (Democratic) 44.10%
Pennsylvania 16	William H. Kurtz	Democratic	1850	Incumbent retired. Whig gain.	▌ ✓ Lemuel Todd (Whig) 51.65%; ▌J. Ellis Booham (Democratic) 48.35%
Pennsylvania 17	Samuel L. Russell	Whig	1852	Incumbent retired. Whig hold.	▌ ✓ David F. Robison (Whig) 51.71%; ▌Wilson Reilly (Democratic) 48.29%
Pennsylvania 18	John McCulloch	Whig	1852	Incumbent retired. Whig hold.	▌ ✓ John R. Edie (Whig) 72.36%; ▌Jacob Croswell (Independent Whig) 27.64%
Pennsylvania 19	Augustus Drum	Democratic	1852	Incumbent lost re-election. Whig gain.	▌ ✓ John Covode (Whig) 58.67%; ▌Augustus Drum (Democratic) 41.33%
Pennsylvania 20	John L. Dawson	Democratic	1850	Incumbent retired. Whig gain.	▌ ✓ Jonathan Knight (Whig) 56.46%; ▌William Montgomery (Democratic) 43.54%
Pennsylvania 21	David Ritchie	Whig	1852	Incumbent re-elected.	▌ ✓ David Ritchie (Whig) 64.85%; ▌Charles Shaler (Democratic) 35.15%
Pennsylvania 22	Thomas M. Howe	Whig	1850	Incumbent retired. Whig hold.	▌ ✓ Samuel A. Purviance (Whig) 58.71%; ▌Orrin D. Palmer (Democratic) 37.97%; ▌I.T. Robinson (Know Nothing) 1.86%; ▌I.G. Bruning (Democratic) 1.26%; ▌Neville B. Craig (Unknown) 0.20%
Pennsylvania 23	Michael C. Trout	Democratic	1852	Incumbent lost re-election. Whig gain.	▌ ✓ John Allison (Whig) 60.15%; ▌Michael C. Trout (Democratic) 39.85%
Pennsylvania 24	Carlton Brandage Curtis	Democratic	1850	Incumbent lost re-election. Democratic hold.	▌ ✓ David Barclay (Democratic) 73.34%; ▌Richard Arthurs (Independent Democrat) 26.25%; ▌Carlton B. Curtis (Unknown) 0.41%
Pennsylvania 25	John Dick	Whig	1852	Incumbent re-elected.	▌ ✓ John Dick (Whig) 100.0%

== Rhode Island ==
Rhode Island held elections on April 4, 1855.

District	Incumbent			This race	
District	Member	Party	First elected	Results	Candidates
Rhode Island 1	Thomas Davis	Democratic	1853	Incumbent lost re-election. Know Nothing gain.	▌ ✓ Nathan B. Durfee (Know Nothing) 75.97%; ▌Thomas Davis (Democratic) 24.03%
Rhode Island 2	Benjamin B. Thurston	Democratic	1851	Incumbent re-elected to a new party. Know Nothing gain.	▌ ✓ Benjamin B. Thurston (Know Nothing) 88.30%; ▌Scattering 11.70%

== South Carolina ==
South Carolina held elections on October 9 and 10, 1854.

District	Incumbent			This race	
District	Member	Party	First elected	Results	Candidates
South Carolina 1	John McQueen	Democratic	1849 (special)	Incumbent re-elected.	▌ ✓ John McQueen (Democratic) 67.44%; ▌I. D. Wilson (Unknown) 32.56%
South Carolina 2	William Aiken Jr.	Democratic	1850	Incumbent re-elected.	▌ ✓ William Aiken Jr. (Democratic) 96.44%; ▌W. C. Clayton (Unknown) 3.56%
South Carolina 3	Laurence M. Keitt	Democratic	1853	Incumbent re-elected.	▌ ✓ Laurence M. Keitt (Democratic) 100.00%
South Carolina 4	Preston Brooks	Democratic	1853	Incumbent re-elected.	▌ ✓ Preston Brooks (Democratic) 66.84%; ▌Garlington (Unknown) 33.16%
South Carolina 5	James L. Orr	Democratic	1853	Incumbent re-elected.	▌ ✓ James L. Orr (Democratic) **
South Carolina 6	William W. Boyce	Democratic	1853	Incumbent re-elected.	▌ ✓ William W. Boyce (Democratic) **

== Tennessee ==
Tennessee held elections on August 2, 1855, after the start of the term but before Congress convened.

District	Incumbent			This race	
District	Member	Party	First elected	Results	Candidates
Tennessee 1	Nathaniel G. Taylor	Whig	1854 (special)	Incumbent lost re-election as a Know Nothing. Democratic gain.	▌ ✓ Albert G. Watkins (Democratic) 50.32%; ▌Nathaniel G. Taylor (Know Nothing) 48.57%; ▌A. G. Graham (Unknown) 1.11%
Tennessee 2	William M. Churchwell	Democratic	1851	Incumbent retired. Know Nothing gain.	▌ ✓ William H. Sneed (Know Nothing) 52.15%; ▌David H. Cummins (Democratic) 47.85%
Tennessee 3	Samuel A. Smith	Democratic	1853	Incumbent re-elected.	▌ ✓ Samuel A. Smith (Democratic) 51.78%; ▌Josiah M. Anderson (Know Nothing) 48.22%
Tennessee 4	William Cullom	Whig	1851	Incumbent lost re-election. Democratic gain.	▌ ✓ John H. Savage (Democratic) 51.96%; ▌William Cullom (Know Nothing) 48.04%
Tennessee 5	Charles Ready	Whig	1853	Incumbent re-elected as a Know Nothing. Know Nothing gain.	▌ ✓ Charles Ready (Know Nothing) 91.79%; ▌Edwin A. Keeble (Democratic) 8.21%
Tennessee 6	George W. Jones	Democratic	1842	Incumbent re-elected.	▌ ✓ George W. Jones (Democratic) 66.63%; ▌Powhatan Gordon (Know Nothing) 33.37%
Tennessee 7	Robert M. Bugg	Whig	1853	Incumbent retired. Democratic gain.	▌ ✓ John V. Wright (Democratic) 57.24%; ▌William Kendrick (Know Nothing) 42.76%
Tennessee 8	Felix Zollicoffer	Whig	1853	Incumbent re-elected as a Know Nothing. Know Nothing gain.	▌ ✓ Felix Zollicoffer (Know Nothing) 58.89%; ▌Granville C. Torbett (Democratic) 41.11%
Tennessee 9	Emerson Etheridge	Whig	1853	Incumbent re-elected as a Know Nothing. Know Nothing gain.	▌ ✓ Emerson Etheridge (Know Nothing) 51.82%; ▌Thomas J. Freeman (Democratic) 48.18%
Tennessee 10	Frederick P. Stanton	Democratic	1845	Incumbent retired. Know Nothing gain.	▌ ✓ Thomas Rivers (Know Nothing) 53.29%; ▌David M. Currin (Democratic) 46.71%

== Texas ==
District	Incumbent			This race	
District	Member	Party	First elected	Results	Candidates
Texas 1	George W. Smyth	Democratic	1853	Incumbent retired. Know Nothing gain.	▌ ✓ Lemuel D. Evans (Know Nothing) 50.10%; ▌Matthias Ward (Democratic) 49.90%
Texas 2	Peter Hansborough Bell	Democratic	1853	Incumbent re-elected.	▌ ✓ Peter H. Bell (Democratic) 60.76%; ▌John Hancock (Know Nothing) 39.24%

== Vermont ==
District	Incumbent			This race	
District	Member	Party	First elected	Results	Candidates
Vermont 1	James Meacham	Whig	1849 (special)	Incumbent re-elected.	▌ ✓ James Meacham (Whig) 71.35%; ▌Solomon W. Jewett (Democratic) 28.65%
Vermont 2	Andrew Tracy	Whig	1852	Incumbent retired. Whig hold.	▌ ✓ Justin S. Morrill (Whig) 50.25%; ▌J. W. Parker (Democratic) 35.07%; ▌Oscar L. Shafter (Free Soil Democratic) 14.67%
Vermont 3	Alvah Sabin	Whig	1852	Incumbent re-elected.	▌ ✓ Alvah Sabin (Whig) 68.54%; ▌William Heywood (Democratic) 31.46%

== Virginia ==
District	Incumbent			This race	
District	Member	Party	First elected	Results	Candidates
Virginia 1	Thomas H. Bayly	Democratic	1853	Incumbent re-elected.	▌ ✓ Thomas H. Bayly (Democratic) 79.08%; ▌Robert L. Montague (Unknown) 9.54%; ▌Richard L. T. Beale (Unknown) 2.30%; ▌Joseph Segar (Unknown) 1.50%; ▌Jennings (Unknown) 1.15%; Scattering 6.42%
Virginia 2	John Millson	Democratic	1853	Incumbent re-elected.	▌ ✓ John Millson (Democratic) 53.29%; ▌Watts (Know Nothing) 46.71%
Virginia 3	John S. Caskie	Democratic	1853	Incumbent re-elected.	▌ ✓ John S. Caskie (Democratic) 52.12%; ▌W. C. Scott (Know Nothing) 47.88%
Virginia 4	William Goode	Democratic	1853	Incumbent re-elected.	▌ ✓ William Goode (Democratic) 61.27%; ▌Littleton Tazewell (Know Nothing) 38.73%
Virginia 5	Thomas S. Bocock	Democratic	1853	Incumbent re-elected.	▌ ✓ Thomas S. Bocock (Democratic) 57.25%; ▌Nathaniel C. Claiborne (Know Nothing) 42.75%
Virginia 6	Paulus Powell	Democratic	1853	Incumbent re-elected.	▌ ✓ Paulus Powell (Democratic) 56.68%; ▌Ligon (Know Nothing) 43.32%
Virginia 7	William Smith	Democratic	1853	Incumbent re-elected.	▌ ✓ William Smith (Democratic) 78.01%; ▌P. Johnson Barbour (Independent) 13.76%; ▌David Funsten (Independent) 8.22%
Virginia 8	Charles J. Faulkner	Democratic	1853	Incumbent re-elected.	▌ ✓ Charles J. Faulkner (Democratic) 50.71%; ▌Alexander Boteler (Know Nothing) 49.29%
Virginia 9	John Letcher	Democratic	1851	Incumbent re-elected.	▌ ✓ John Letcher (Democratic) 94.08%; ▌Alexander H. H. Stuart (Unknown) 1.84%; Scattering 4.07%
Virginia 10	Zedekiah Kidwell	Democratic	1853	Incumbent re-elected.	▌ ✓ Zedekiah Kidwell (Democratic) 54.50%; ▌William K. Pendleton (Know Nothing) 45.50%
Virginia 11	Charles S. Lewis	Democratic	1854 (special)	Incumbent lost re-election. Know Nothing gain.	▌ ✓ John S. Carlile (Know Nothing) 51.20%; ▌Charles S. Lewis (Democratic) 48.80%
Virginia 12	Henry A. Edmundson	Democratic	1849	Incumbent re-elected.	▌ ✓ Henry A. Edmundson (Democratic) 53.99%; ▌Waller R. Staples (Know Nothing) 46.01%
Virginia 13	Fayette McMullen	Democratic	1849	Incumbent re-elected.	▌ ✓ Fayette McMullen (Democratic) 59.18%; ▌Trigg (Know Nothing) 40.82%

== Wisconsin ==
District	Incumbent			This race	
District	Member	Party	First elected	Results	Candidates
Wisconsin 1	Daniel Wells Jr.	Democratic	1852	Incumbent re-elected.	▌ ✓ Daniel Wells Jr. (Democratic) 54.62%; ▌Wyman Spooner (Republican) 45.38%
Wisconsin 2	Ben C. Eastman	Democratic	1850	Incumbent retired. Republican gain.	▌ ✓ Cadwallader C. Washburn (Republican) 59.50%; ▌Otis Hoyt (Democratic) 39.76%; ▌David Taylor (Unknown) 0.74%
Wisconsin 3	John B. Macy	Democratic	1852	Incumbent lost re-election. Republican gain.	▌ ✓ Charles Billinghurst (Republican) 55.94%; ▌John B. Macy (Democratic) 36.00%; ▌Harvey G. Turner (Independent Democratic) 8.06%

== Non-voting delegates ==
=== 33rd Congress ===
District	Incumbent			This race	
District	Delegate	Party	First elected	Results	Candidates
Kansas Territory at-large	None (new seat)			New seat. Pro-Slavery gain.	▌ ✓ John W. Whitfield (Pro-Slavery) 79.70%; ▌Robert P. Flenniken (Independent) 10.76%; ▌John A. Wakefield (Free State) 8.75%; ▌John B. Chapman (Unknown) 0.56%; Scattering 0.21%
Nebraska Territory at-large	None (new seat) (Note: Hadley D. Johnson and Thomas Johnson were each extralegally elected to this seat in 1853, but neither was seated by the House.)			New seat. Anti-Nebraska Democratic gain.	▌ ✓ Napoleon B. Giddings (Anti-Nebraska Democratic) 47.66%; ▌Hadley D. Johnson (Democratic) 33.50%; ▌Bird B. Chapman (Democratic) 14.41%; ▌Joseph Dyson (Democratic) 2.65%; ▌Abner W. Hollister (Unknown) 1.77%

=== 34th Congress ===
District	Incumbent			This race	
District	Delegate	Party	First elected	Results	Candidates
Kansas Territory at-large	John Wilkins Whitfield	Pro-Slavery	1854	Incumbent re-elected. Winner later unseated. (Note: Rival governments of the Kansas Territory held separate elections for this seat during Bleeding Kansas. Proslavery border ruffians elected Whitfield on October 1, 1855; antislavery free staters elected Reeder on October 9. The House declared both elections illegitimate on August 4, 1856, leading to a special election later that year.)	▌ ✓ John W. Whitfield (Pro-Slavery) 99.38%; Scattering 0.62%
Kansas Territory at-large	John Wilkins Whitfield	Pro-Slavery	1854	Incumbent did not contest. Free State gain. Winner subsequently not seated.	▌ ✓ Andrew H. Reeder (Free State) 100.00%
Minnesota Territory at-large	Henry M. Rice	Democratic	1852	Incumbent re-elected.	▌ ✓ Henry M. Rice (Democratic) 46.00%; ▌William R. Marshall (Republican) 32.46%; ▌David Olmsted (Anti-Nebraska Democratic) 21.54%
Nebraska Territory at-large	Napoleon B. Giddings	Anti-Nebraska Democratic	1854	Incumbent retired. Nebraska gain.	▌ ✓ Bird B. Chapman (Nebraska) 50.79%; ▌Hiram P. Bennet (Anti-Nebraska) 49.21%
New Mexico Territory at-large	José Manuel Gallegos	Mexican; Democratic	1853	Incumbent re-elected. Winner later unseated.	▌ ✓ José Manuel Gallegos (Mexican Democratic) 50.36%; ▌Miguel A. Otero (American Democratic) 49.64%
Oregon Territory at-large	Joseph Lane	Democratic	1851	Incumbent re-elected.	▌ ✓ Joseph Lane (Democratic) 61.04%; ▌John P. Gaines (Know Nothing) 38.96%

== See also ==
- 1854 United States elections
- List of United States House of Representatives elections (1824–1854)
- 1854–55 United States Senate elections
- 33rd United States Congress
- 34th United States Congress

== Bibliography ==
=== Primary sources ===
- Greeley, Horace, ed. (1855). The Whig Almanac and United States Register for 1855. Albany, NY.
- Greeley, Horace, ed. (1856). The Tribune Almanac and Political Register for 1856. Albany, NY.
- Hough, Franklin B. (1858). The New York Civil List [...]. Albany, NY.

=== Secondary sources ===
- Andreas, A. T. (1883). History of the State of Kansas [...]. Chicago.
- Bartlett, D. W. (1865). Cases of Contested Elections in Congress, from 1834 to 1865, Inclusive. Washington, D.C.
- Blackmar, Frank W., ed. (1912). Kansas: A Cyclopedia of State History [...]. Chicago: Standard Publishing Company.
- Dubin, Michael J. (March 1, 1998). United States Congressional Elections, 1788-1997: The Official Results of the Elections of the 1st Through 105th Congresses. McFarland and Company. ISBN 978-0786402830.
- Gonzales, Phillip B. (2016). Politica: Nuevomexicanos and American Political Incorporation, 1821–1910. Lincoln: University of Nebraska Press.
- Holt, Michael F. (1999). The Rise and Fall of the American Whig Party: Jacksonian Politics and the Onset of the Civil War. New York: Oxford University Press. ISBN 978-0-19-505544-3.
- Martis, Kenneth C. (1989). The Historical Atlas of Political Parties in the United States Congress, 1789-1989. Macmillan Publishing Company. ISBN 978-0029201701.
- McPherson, James M. (1988). Battle Cry of Freedom: The Civil War Era. New York: Oxford University.
- Morton, J. Sterling (1907). Illustrated History of Nebraska. Lincoln, NE: Jacob North and Company.
- Moore, John L., ed. (1994). Congressional Quarterly's Guide to U.S. Elections (Third ed.). Congressional Quarterly Inc. ISBN 978-0871879967.
- "Party Divisions of the House of Representatives* 1789–Present". Office of the Historian, United States House of Representatives.
