= 33rd United States Congress =

1853-1855 U.S. Congress

←	32nd	34th	→
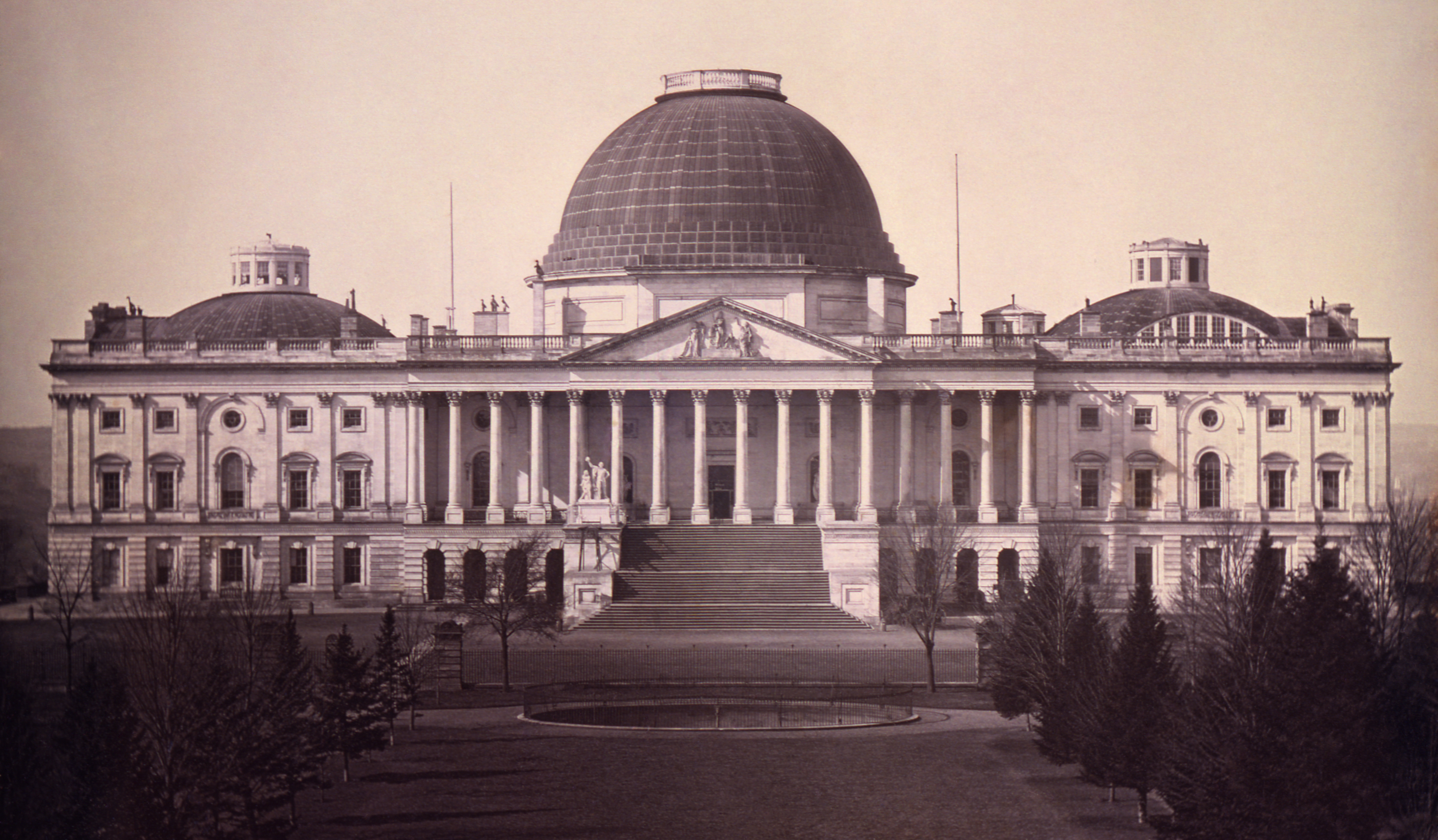
- United States Capitol (1846)

Overview
- Legislative body: United States Congress
- Jurisdiction: United States
- Term: March 4, 1853 – March 4, 1855

Senate
- Members: 62
- President: William R. King (Democrat) (until April 18, 1853); Vacant (from April 18, 1853)
- President pro tempore: David R. Atchison (Democrat); Lewis Cass (D); Jesse D. Bright (Democrat)
- Party control: Democratic

House of Representatives
- Members: 234 representatives 7 non-voting delegates
- Speaker: Linn Boyd (Democrat)
- Party control: Democratic

Sessions
- Special (Note: Special session of the Senate.): March 4, 1853 – April 11, 1853
- 1st: December 5, 1853 – August 7, 1854
- 2nd: December 4, 1854 – March 4, 1855

The 33rd United States Congress was a meeting of the legislative branch of the United States federal government, consisting of the United States Senate and the United States House of Representatives. It met in Washington, D.C. from March 4, 1853, to March 4, 1855, during the first two years of Franklin Pierce's presidency. During this session, the Kansas–Nebraska Act was passed, an act that soon led to the creation of the Republican Party. The apportionment of seats in the House of Representatives was based on the 1850 United States census. Both chambers had a Democratic majority.

== Major events ==
Gadsden Purchase (in yellow)

- March 4, 1853: Franklin Pierce became 14th President of the United States
- April 18, 1853: Vice President William R. King died
- July 8, 1853: Commodore Matthew C. Perry arrived in Edo Bay with a request for a trade treaty
- December 30, 1853: Gadsden Purchase: The United States bought land from Mexico to facilitate railroad building in the Southwest
- March 20, 1854: Republican Party founded

== Major legislation ==
- May 30, 1854: Kansas–Nebraska Act, ch. 59, 10 Stat. 277
- March 3, 1855: The U.S. Congress appropriates $30,000 to create the U.S. Camel Corps

== Treaties ==
- January 26, 1854: Point No Point Treaty signed
- March 31, 1854: Convention of Kanagawa signed with the Japanese government, opening the ports of Shimoda and Hakodate to American trade

== Territories organized ==
- May 30, 1854 – Kansas Territory was organized.
- May 30, 1854 – Nebraska Territory was organized.

== Party summary ==
=== Senate ===
	Party (shading shows control)					Total	Vacant
	Know Nothing (A)	Democratic (D)	Free Soil (F)	Whig (W)	Other (O)	Total	Vacant
End of previous congress	0	35	3	23	0	61	1
Begin	1	35	2	19	0	57	5
End	1	37	5	17	0	60	2
Final voting share	1.7%	61.7%	8.3%	28.3%	0.0%		
Beginning of next congress	2	35	2	9	7	55	7

=== House of Representatives ===
For the beginning of this congress, the size of the House was increased from 233 seats to 234 seats, following the 1850 United States census (See 9 Stat. 433).

Affiliation	Party (Shading indicates majority caucus)						Total	
Affiliation	Democratic (D)	Independent Democratic (ID)	Free Soil (FS)	Whig (W)	Independent (I)	Other	Total	Vacant
End of previous Congress	125	3	4	86	0	14	232	1
Begin	157	1	4	71	1	0	234	0
End	155	1	3	74	1	0	234	0
Final voting share	66.7%	0.4%	0.9%	31.6%	0.4%	0.1%		
Beginning of next Congress	79	(Opposition coalition); 154					233	1

== Leadership ==
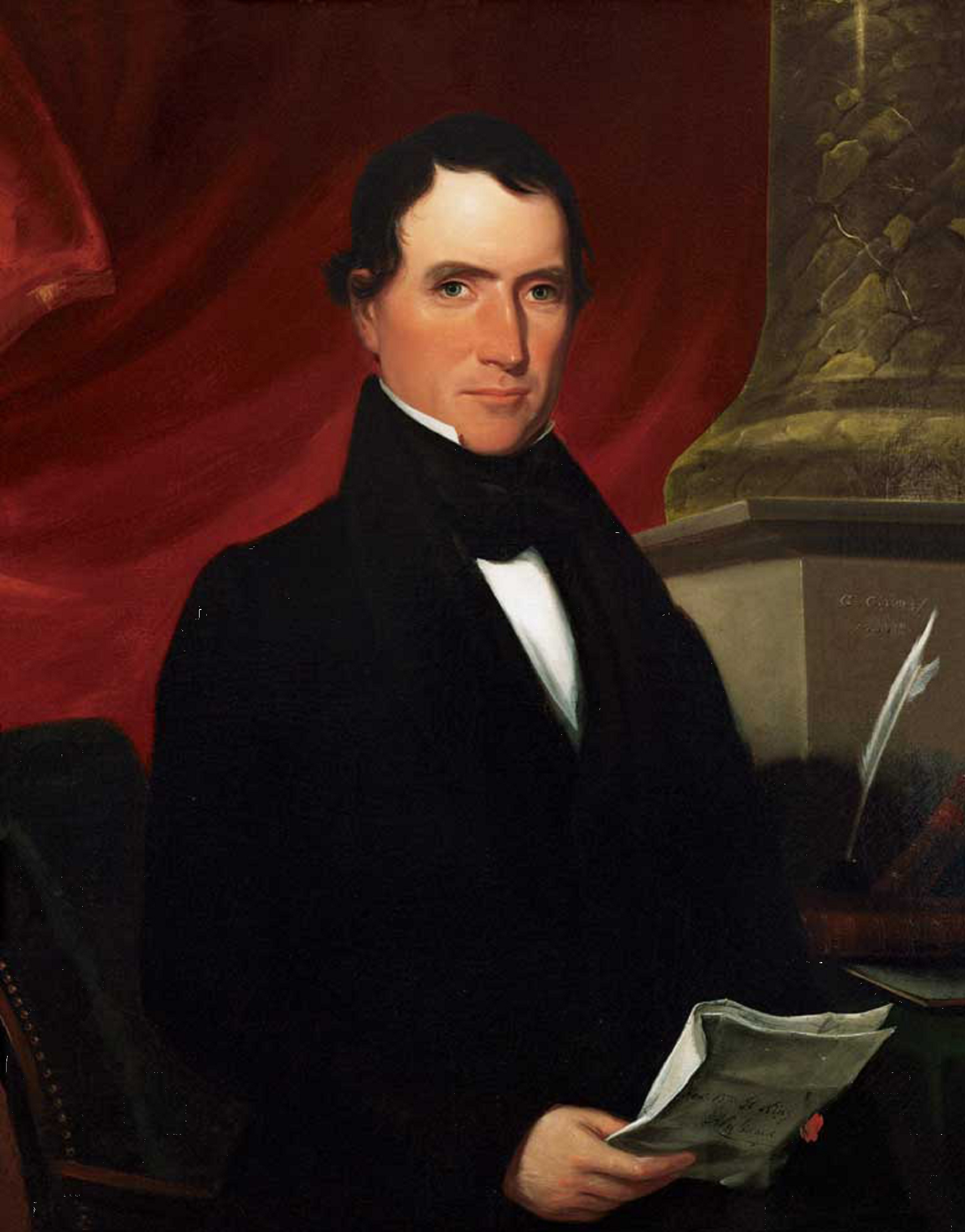
President of the Senate William R. King

=== Senate ===
- President: William R. King (D), until April 18, 1853; vacant thereafter.
- President pro tempore: David R. Atchison (D), until December 4, 1854
  - Lewis Cass (D), December 4, 1854
  - Jesse D. Bright (D), from December 5, 1854

=== House of Representatives ===
- Speaker: Linn Boyd (D)
- Democratic Caucus Chairman: Edson B. Olds

== Members ==
This list is arranged by chamber, then by state. Senators are listed by class, and representatives are listed by district.

=== Senate ===
Senators were elected by the state legislatures every two years, with one-third beginning new six-year terms with each Congress. Preceding the names in the list below are Senate class numbers, which indicate the cycle of their election. In this Congress, Class 1 meant their term began in the last Congress, requiring re-election in 1856; Class 2 meant their term began with this Congress, requiring re-election in 1858; and Class 3 meant their term ended with this Congress, requiring re-election in 1854. The United States consisted of 31 states during this Congress.

Skip to House of Representatives, below

==== Alabama ====
▌2. Clement C. Clay Jr. (D), from November 29, 1853
▌3. Benjamin Fitzpatrick (D)

==== Arkansas ====
▌2. William K. Sebastian (D)
▌3. Solon Borland (D), until April 11, 1853

▌Robert W. Johnson (D), from July 6, 1853

==== California ====
▌1. John B. Weller (D)
▌3. William M. Gwin (D)

==== Connecticut ====
▌1. Isaac Toucey (D)
▌3. Truman Smith (W), until May 24, 1854

▌Francis Gillette (FS), from May 24, 1854

==== Delaware ====
▌1. James A. Bayard Jr. (D)
▌2. John M. Clayton (W)

==== Florida ====
▌1. Stephen Mallory (D)
▌3. Jackson Morton (W)

==== Georgia ====
▌2. Robert Toombs (D)
▌3. William C. Dawson (W)

==== Illinois ====
▌2. Stephen A. Douglas (D)
▌3. James Shields (D)

==== Indiana ====
▌1. Jesse D. Bright (D)
▌3. John Pettit (D)

==== Iowa ====
▌2. George Wallace Jones (D)
▌3. Augustus C. Dodge (D), until February 22, 1855

==== Kentucky ====
▌2. John B. Thompson (A)
▌3. Archibald Dixon (W)

==== Louisiana ====
▌2. Judah P. Benjamin (W)
▌3. Pierre Soulé (D), until April 11, 1853

▌John Slidell (D), from December 5, 1853

==== Maine ====
▌1. Hannibal Hamlin (D)
▌2. William Pitt Fessenden (W), from February 10, 1854

==== Maryland ====
▌1. Thomas Pratt (W)
▌3. James A. Pearce (W)

==== Massachusetts ====
▌1. Charles Sumner (FS)
▌2. Edward Everett (W), until June 1, 1854

▌Julius Rockwell (W), from June 3, 1854, until January 31, 1855
▌Henry Wilson (FS), from January 31, 1855

==== Michigan ====
▌1. Lewis Cass (D)
▌2. Charles E. Stuart (D)

==== Mississippi ====
▌1. Stephen Adams (D)
▌2. Albert G. Brown (D), from January 7, 1854

==== Missouri ====
▌1. Henry S. Geyer (W)
▌3. David R. Atchison (D)

==== New Hampshire ====
▌2. Charles G. Atherton (D), until November 15, 1853

▌Jared W. Williams (D), from November 29, 1853, until July 15, 1854

▌3. Moses Norris Jr. (D), until January 11, 1855

▌John S. Wells (D), from January 16, 1855

==== New Jersey ====
▌1. John R. Thomson (D)
▌2. William Wright (D)

==== New York ====
▌1. Hamilton Fish (W)
▌3. William H. Seward (W)

==== North Carolina ====
▌2. David S. Reid (D), from December 6, 1854
▌3. George E. Badger (W)

==== Ohio ====
▌1. Benjamin Wade (W)
▌3. Salmon P. Chase (FS)

==== Pennsylvania ====
▌1. Richard Brodhead (D)
▌3. James Cooper (W)

==== Rhode Island ====
▌1. Charles T. James (D)
▌2. Philip Allen (D), from July 20, 1853

==== South Carolina ====
▌2. Josiah J. Evans (D)
▌3. Andrew Butler (D)

==== Tennessee ====
▌1. James C. Jones (W)
▌2. John Bell (W)

==== Texas ====
▌1. Thomas J. Rusk (D)
▌2. Samuel Houston (D)

==== Vermont ====
▌1. Solomon Foot (W)
▌3. Samuel S. Phelps (W), until March 16, 1854

▌Lawrence Brainerd (FS), from October 14, 1854

==== Virginia ====
▌1. James M. Mason (D)
▌2. Robert M. T. Hunter (D)

==== Wisconsin ====
▌1. Henry Dodge (D)
▌3. Isaac P. Walker (D)

Senators' party membership by state at the opening of the 33rd Congress in March 1853. The gray stripes represent Know-Nothings. The green stripes represent Free Soil. 2 Democrats 1 Democrat and 1 Whig 2 Whigs

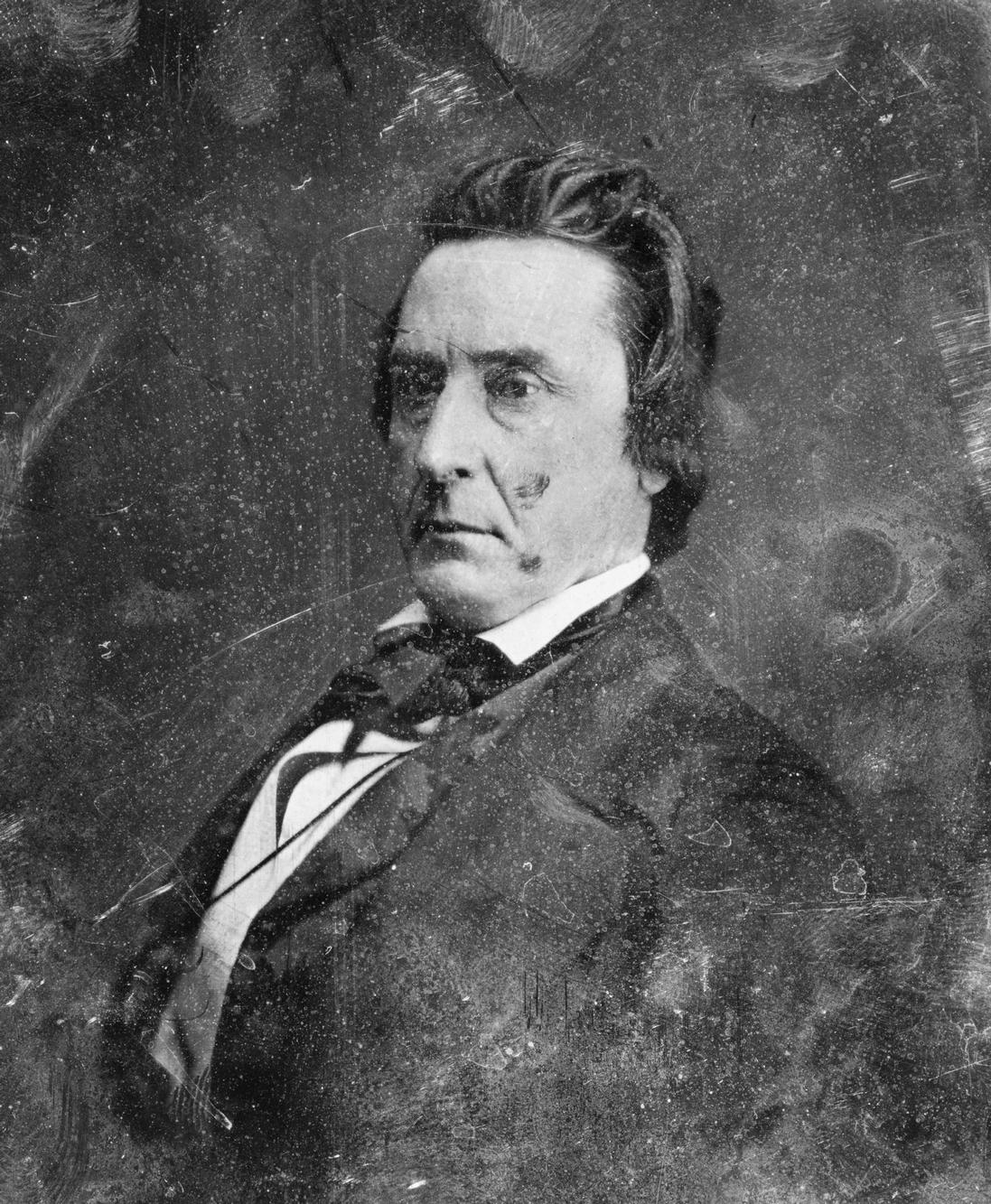
Senate President pro tempore David R. Atchison

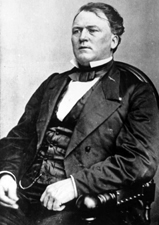
Senate President pro tempore Jesse D. Bright

=== House of Representatives ===
The names of representatives are preceded by their district numbers.

==== Alabama ====
▌1. Philip Phillips (D)
▌2. James Abercrombie (W)
▌3. Sampson W. Harris (D)
▌4. William R. Smith (D)
▌5. George S. Houston (D)
▌6. Williamson R. W. Cobb (D)
▌7. James F. Dowdell (D)

==== Arkansas ====
▌1. Alfred B. Greenwood (D)
▌2. Edward A. Warren (D)

==== California ====
Both representatives were elected statewide on a general ticket.

▌At-large. Milton Latham (D)
▌At-large. James A. McDougall (D)

==== Connecticut ====
▌1. James T. Pratt (D)
▌2. Colin M. Ingersoll (D)
▌3. Nathan Belcher (D)
▌4. Origen S. Seymour (D)

==== Delaware ====
▌At-large. George Read Riddle (D)

==== Florida ====
▌At-large. Augustus Maxwell (D)

==== Georgia ====
▌1. James L. Seward (D)
▌2. Alfred H. Colquitt (D)
▌3. David J. Bailey (D)
▌4. William B. W. Dent (D)
▌5. Elijah W. Chastain (D)
▌6. Junius Hillyer (D)
▌7. David A. Reese (W)
▌8. Alexander Stephens (W)

==== Illinois ====
▌1. Elihu B. Washburne (W)
▌2. John Wentworth (D)
▌3. Jesse O. Norton (W)
▌4. James Knox (W)
▌5. William A. Richardson (D)
▌6. Richard Yates (W)
▌7. James C. Allen (D)
▌8. William H. Bissell (ID)
▌9. Willis Allen (D)

==== Indiana ====
▌1. Smith Miller (D)
▌2. William H. English (D)
▌3. Cyrus L. Dunham (D)
▌4. James H. Lane (D)
▌5. Samuel W. Parker (W)
▌6. Thomas A. Hendricks (D)
▌7. John G. Davis (D)
▌8. Daniel Mace (D)
▌9. Norman Eddy (D)
▌10. Ebenezer M. Chamberlain (D)
▌11. Andrew J. Harlan (D)

==== Iowa ====
▌1. Bernhart Henn (D)
▌2. John P. Cook (W)

==== Kentucky ====
▌1. Linn Boyd (D)
▌2. Benjamin E. Grey (W)
▌3. Presley Ewing (W), until September 27, 1854

▌Francis Bristow (W), from December 4, 1854

▌4. James Chrisman (D)
▌5. Clement S. Hill (W)
▌6. John M. Elliott (D)
▌7. William Preston (W)
▌8. John C. Breckinridge (D)
▌9. Leander Cox (W)
▌10. Richard H. Stanton (D)

==== Louisiana ====
▌1. William Dunbar (D)
▌2. Theodore G. Hunt (W)
▌3. John Perkins Jr. (D)
▌4. Roland Jones (D)

==== Maine ====
▌1. Moses MacDonald (D)
▌2. Samuel Mayall (D)
▌3. E. Wilder Farley (W)
▌4. Samuel P. Benson (W)
▌5. Israel Washburn Jr. (W)
▌6. Thomas J. D. Fuller (D)

==== Maryland ====
▌1. John R. Franklin (W)
▌2. Jacob Shower (D)
▌3. Joshua Van Sant (D)
▌4. Henry May (D)
▌5. William T. Hamilton (D)
▌6. Augustus R. Sollers (W)

==== Massachusetts ====
▌1. Zeno Scudder (W), until March 4, 1854

▌Thomas D. Eliot (W), from April 17, 1854

▌2. Samuel L. Crocker (W)
▌3. J. Wiley Edmands (W)
▌4. Samuel H. Walley (W)
▌5. William Appleton (W)
▌6. Charles W. Upham (W)
▌7. Nathaniel P. Banks (D)
▌8. Tappan Wentworth (W)
▌9. Alexander De Witt (FS)
▌10. Edward Dickinson (W)
▌11. John Z. Goodrich (W)

==== Michigan ====
▌1. David Stuart (D)
▌2. David A. Noble (D)
▌3. Samuel Clark (D)
▌4. Hestor L. Stevens (D)

==== Mississippi ====
▌1. Daniel B. Wright (D)
▌2. William T. S. Barry (D)
▌3. Otho R. Singleton (D)
▌4. Wiley P. Harris (D)
▌At-large. William Barksdale (D)

==== Missouri ====
▌1. Thomas H. Benton (D)
▌2. Alfred W. Lamb (D)
▌3. James J. Lindley (W)
▌4. Mordecai Oliver (W)
▌5. John G. Miller (W)
▌6. John S. Phelps (D)
▌7. Samuel Caruthers (W)

==== New Hampshire ====
▌1. George W. Kittredge (D)
▌2. George W. Morrison (D)
▌3. Harry Hibbard (D)

==== New Jersey ====
▌1. Nathan T. Stratton (D)
▌2. Charles Skelton (D)
▌3. Samuel Lilly (D)
▌4. George Vail (D)
▌5. Alexander C. M. Pennington (W)

==== New York ====
▌1. James Maurice (D)
▌2. Thomas W. Cumming (D)
▌3. Hiram Walbridge (D)
▌4. Michael Walsh (D)
▌5. William M. Tweed (D)
▌6. John Wheeler (D)
▌7. William A. Walker (D)
▌8. Francis B. Cutting (D)
▌9. Jared V. Peck (D)
▌10. William Murray (D)
▌11. Theodoric R. Westbrook (D)
▌12. Gilbert Dean (D), until July 3, 1854

▌Isaac Teller (W), from November 7, 1854

▌13. Russell Sage (W)
▌14. Rufus W. Peckham (D)
▌15. Charles Hughes (D)
▌16. George A. Simmons (W)
▌17. Bishop Perkins (D)
▌18. Peter Rowe (D)
▌19. George W. Chase (W)
▌20. Orsamus B. Matteson (W)
▌21. Henry Bennett (W)
▌22. Gerrit Smith (FS), until August 7, 1854

▌Henry C. Goodwin (W), from November 7, 1854

▌23. Caleb Lyon (I)
▌24. Daniel T. Jones (D)
▌25. Edwin B. Morgan (W)
▌26. Andrew Oliver (D)
▌27. John J. Taylor (D)
▌28. George Hastings (D)
▌29. Azariah Boody (W) until October 13, 1853

▌Davis Carpenter (W), from November 8, 1853

▌30. Benjamin Pringle (W)
▌31. Thomas T. Flagler (W)
▌32. Solomon G. Haven (W)
▌33. Reuben Fenton (D)

==== North Carolina ====
▌1. Henry M. Shaw (D)
▌2. Thomas H. Ruffin (D)
▌3. William S. Ashe (D)
▌4. Sion H. Rogers (W)
▌5. John Kerr Jr. (W)
▌6. Richard C. Puryear (W)
▌7. F. Burton Craige (D)
▌8. Thomas L. Clingman (D)

==== Ohio ====
▌1. David T. Disney (D)
▌2. John Scott Harrison (W)
▌3. Lewis D. Campbell (W)
▌4. Matthias H. Nichols (D)
▌5. Alfred P. Edgerton (D)
▌6. Andrew Ellison (D)
▌7. Aaron Harlan (W)
▌8. Moses B. Corwin (W)
▌9. Frederick W. Green (D)
▌10. John L. Taylor (W)
▌11. Thomas Ritchey (D)
▌12. Edson B. Olds (D)
▌13. William D. Lindsley (D)
▌14. Harvey H. Johnson (D)
▌15. William R. Sapp (W)
▌16. Edward Ball (W)
▌17. Wilson Shannon (D)
▌18. George Bliss (D)
▌19. Edward Wade (FS)
▌20. Joshua R. Giddings (FS)
▌21. Andrew Stuart (D)

==== Pennsylvania ====
▌1. Thomas B. Florence (D)
▌2. Joseph R. Chandler (W)
▌3. John Robbins Jr. (D)
▌4. William H. Witte (D)
▌5. John McNair (D)
▌6. William Everhart (W)
▌7. Samuel A. Bridges (D)
▌8. Henry A. Muhlenberg (D), until January 9, 1854

▌J. Glancey Jones (D), from February 4, 1854

▌9. Isaac E. Hiester (W)
▌10. Ner A. Middleswarth (W)
▌11. Christian M. Straub (D)
▌12. Hendrick B. Wright (D)
▌13. Asa Packer (D)
▌14. Galusha A. Grow (D)
▌15. James Gamble (D)
▌16. William H. Kurtz (D)
▌17. Samuel L. Russell (W)
▌18. John McCulloch (W)
▌19. Augustus Drum (D)
▌20. John L. Dawson (D)
▌21. David Ritchie (W)
▌22. Thomas M. Howe (W)
▌23. Michael C. Trout (D)
▌24. Carlton B. Curtis (D)
▌25. John Dick (W)

==== Rhode Island ====
▌1. Thomas Davis (D)
▌2. Benjamin B. Thurston (D)

==== South Carolina ====
▌1. John McQueen (D)
▌2. William Aiken Jr. (D)
▌3. Laurence M. Keitt (D)
▌4. Preston Brooks (D)
▌5. James L. Orr (D)
▌6. William W. Boyce (D)

==== Tennessee ====
▌1. Brookins Campbell (D), until December 25, 1853

▌Nathaniel G. Taylor (W), from March 30, 1854

▌2. William M. Churchwell (D)
▌3. Samuel A. Smith (D)
▌4. William Cullom (W)
▌5. Charles Ready (W)
▌6. George W. Jones (D)
▌7. Robert M. Bugg (W)
▌8. Felix K. Zollicoffer (W)
▌9. Emerson Etheridge (W)
▌10. Frederick P. Stanton (D)

==== Texas ====
▌1. George W. Smyth (D)
▌2. Peter H. Bell (D)

==== Vermont ====
▌1. James Meacham (W)
▌2. Andrew Tracy (W)
▌3. Alvah Sabin (W)

==== Virginia ====
▌1. Thomas H. Bayly (D)
▌2. John S. Millson (D)
▌3. John Caskie (D)
▌4. William Goode (D)
▌5. Thomas S. Bocock (D)
▌6. Paulus Powell (D)
▌7. William Smith (D)
▌8. Charles J. Faulkner Sr. (D)
▌9. John Letcher (D)
▌10. Zedekiah Kidwell (D)
▌11. John F. Snodgrass (D), until June 5, 1854

▌Charles S. Lewis (D), from December 4, 1854

▌12. Henry A. Edmundson (D)
▌13. LaFayette McMullen (D)

==== Wisconsin ====
▌1. Daniel Wells Jr. (D)
▌2. Ben C. Eastman (D)
▌3. John B. Macy (D)

==== Non-voting members ====
▌Kansas Territory. John W. Whitfield (D), from December 20, 1854
▌Minnesota Territory. Henry M. Rice (D)
▌Nebraska Territory. Napoleon B. Giddings (D), from January 5, 1855
▌New Mexico Territory. José Manuel Gallegos (D)
▌Oregon Territory. Joseph Lane (D)
Utah Territory. John M. Bernhisel
▌Washington Territory. Columbia Lancaster (D), from April 12, 1854

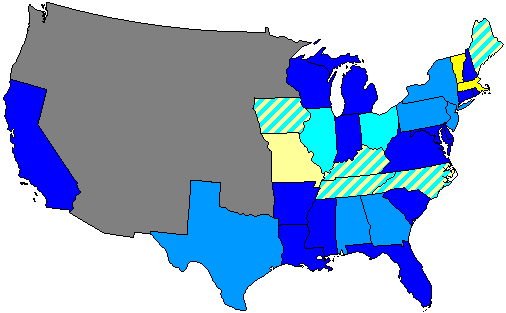
House seats by party holding plurality in state: 80.1-100% Democratic / Up to 60% Whig; 60.1-80% Democratic / 60.1-80% Whig; Up to 60% Democratic / 80.1-100% Whig

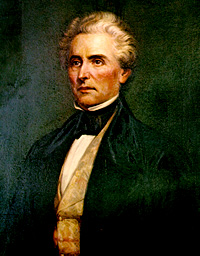
House Speaker Linn Boyd

== Changes in membership ==
The count below reflects changes from the beginning of the first session of this Congress.

=== Senate ===
- Replacements: 7
  - Democrats (D): 2 seat net gain
  - Whigs (W): 2 seat net loss
  - Free Soilers (FS): 3 seat net gain (Note: By some reckonings, Wilson is a Know-Nothing/Free Soil joint candidate)
- Deaths: 2
- Resignations: 4
- Interim appointments: 1
- Total seats with changes: 13

Senate changes
State (class)	Vacated by	Reason for change	Successor	Date of successor's formal installation (Note: When seated or oath administered, not necessarily when service began.)
Rhode Island (2)	Vacant	Failure to elect. Successor was elected July 20, 1853.	Philip Allen (D)	July 20, 1853
Alabama (2)	Vacant	Failure to elect. Successor elected November 29, 1853.	Clement C. Clay (D)	November 29, 1853
Mississippi (2)	Vacant	Failure to elect. Successor elected January 7, 1854.	Albert G. Brown (D)	January 7, 1854
Maine (2)	Vacant	Failure to elect. Successor was elected February 10, 1854.	William P. Fessenden (W)	February 10, 1854
North Carolina (2)	Vacant	Failure to elect. Successor was elected December 6, 1854.	David Reid (D)	December 6, 1854
Arkansas (3)	Solon Borland (D)	Resigned April 11, 1853, after being appointed U.S. Minister to Nicaragua and other Central American Republics. Successor appointed July 6, 1853.	Robert W. Johnson (D)	July 6, 1853
Louisiana (3)	Pierre Soulé (D)	Resigned April 11, 1853, after being appointed U.S. Minister to Spain. Successor elected December 5, 1853.	John Slidell (D)	December 5, 1853
New Hampshire (2)	Charles G. Atherton (D)	Died November 15, 1853.	Jared W. Williams (D)	November 29, 1853
Vermont (3)	Samuel S. Phelps (W)	Senate declared not entitled to seat March 16, 1854. Successor elected October 14, 1854.	Lawrence Brainerd (FS)	October 14, 1854
Connecticut (3)	Truman Smith (W)	Resigned May 24, 1854. Successor was elected May 24, 1854.	Francis Gillette (FS)	May 24, 1854
Massachusetts (2)	Edward Everett (W)	Resigned June 1, 1854; Successor was appointed to serve until a new successor was elected.	Julius Rockwell (W)	June 3, 1854
New Hampshire (2)	Jared W. Williams (D)	Resigned August 4, 1854.	Vacant	Not filled this term
New Hampshire (3)	Moses Norris Jr. (D)	Died January 11, 1855. Successor appointed January 16, 1855, to finish the term.	John S. Wells (D)	January 16, 1855
Massachusetts (2)	Julius Rockwell (W)	Successor elected January 31, 1855.	Henry Wilson (FS) (Note: By some reckonings, Wilson is a Know-Nothing/Free Soil joint candidate)	January 31, 1855
Iowa (3)	Augustus C. Dodge (D)	Resigned February 22, 1855, after being appointed U.S. Minister to Spain.	Vacant	Not filled this term

=== House of Representatives ===
- Replacements: 7
  - Democrats (D): 2 seat net loss
  - Whigs (W): 3 seat net gain
  - Free Soilers (FS): 1 seat net loss
- Deaths: 4
- Resignations: 4
- Total seats with changes: 8

House changes
District	Vacated by	Reason for change	Successor	Date of successor's formal installation
Washington Territory at-large	Vacant	New seat established after Washington became a territory near the end of previous Congress. Seat was vacant until April 12, 1854.	Columbia Lancaster (D)	Seated April 12, 1854
New York 29th	Azariah Boody (W)	Resigned on October 13, 1853	Davis Carpenter (W)	Seated November 8, 1853
Tennessee 1st	Brookins Campbell (D)	Died December 25, 1853	Nathaniel G. Taylor (W)	Seated March 30, 1854
Pennsylvania 8th	Henry A. Muhlenberg (D)	Died January 9, 1854	J. Glancy Jones (D)	Seated February 4, 1854
Massachusetts 1st	Zeno Scudder (W)	Resigned March 4, 1854	Thomas D. Eliot (W)	Seated April 17, 1854
Kansas Territory at-large	New seat	New seat established after Kansas became a territory May 30, 1854. Seat was vacant until December 20, 1854.	John W. Whitfield (D)	Seated December 20, 1854
Nebraska Territory at-large	New seat	New seat established after Nebraska became a territory May 30, 1854. Seat was vacant until January 5, 1855.	Napoleon B. Giddings (D)	Seated December 5, 1855
Virginia 11th	John F. Snodgrass (D)	Died June 5, 1854	Charles S. Lewis (D)	Seated December 4, 1854
New York 12th	Gilbert Dean (D)	Resigned July 3, 1854, after being appointed justice of the Supreme Court of New York	Isaac Teller (W)	Seated November 7, 1854
New York 22nd	Gerrit Smith (W)	Resigned August 7, 1854	Henry C. Goodwin (W)	Seated November 7, 1854
Kentucky 3rd	Presley Ewing (W)	Died September 27, 1854	Francis Bristow (W)	Seated December 4, 1854

== Committees ==
List of committees and their party leaders.

=== Senate ===
- Agriculture (Chairman: Philip Allen)
- American Association for the Promotion of Science (Select)
- Atmospheric Telegraph Between Washington and Baltimore (Select)
- Audit and Control the Contingent Expenses of the Senate (Chairman: Josiah J. Evans)
- Claims (Chairman: Richard Brodhead)
- Commerce (Chairman: Hannibal Hamlin)
- Distributing Public Revenue Among the States (Select)
- District of Columbia (Chairman: Moses Norris Jr.)
- Engrossed Bills (Chairman: Benjamin Fitzpatrick)
- Finance (Chairman: Robert M.T. Hunter)
- Foreign Relations (Chairman: James M. Mason)
- French Spoilations (Select)
- Indian Affairs (Chairman: William K. Sebastian)
- Judiciary (Chairman: Andrew P. Butler)
- Library (Chairman: James A. Pearce)
- Loss of Original Papers of Mark and Richard Bean (Select)
- Manufactures (Chairman: Hannibal Hamlin)
- Mexican Claims Commission (Select)
- Military Affairs (Chairman: James Shields)
- Militia (Chairman: Sam Houston)
- Naval Affairs (Chairman: William M. Gwin)
- Ordnance and War Ships (Select)
- Pacific Railroad (Select) (Chairman: William M. Gwin)
- Patents and the Patent Office (Chairman: Charles T. James)
- Pensions (Chairman: George Wallace Jones)
- Post Office and Post Roads (Chairman: Thomas J. Rusk)
- Printing (Chairman: Benjamin Fitzpatrick)
- Private Claims Commission (Select)
- Private Land Claims (Chairman: John Pettit)
- Protection of Life and Health in Passenger Ships (Select)
- Public Buildings and Grounds (Chairman: James A. Bayard Jr.)
- Public Lands (Chairman: Augustus Dodge)
- Retrenchment (Chairman: Stephen Adams)
- Revolutionary Claims (Chairman: Isaac P. Walker)
- Roads and Canals (Chairman: John Slidell)
- Sickness on Emigrant Ships (Select)
- Tariff Regulation (Select)
- Territories (Chairman: Stephen A. Douglas)
- Whole

=== House of Representatives ===
- Accounts (Chairman: Carlton B. Curtis)
- Agriculture (Chairman: John L. Dawson)
- Claims (Chairman: Alfred P. Edgerton)
- Commerce (Chairman: Frederick P. Stanton)
- District of Columbia (Chairman: William T. Hamilton)
- Elections (Chairman: Richard H. Stanton)
- Engraving (Chairman: George R. Riddle)
- Expenditures in the Navy Department (Chairman: Fayette McMullen)
- Expenditures in the Post Office Department (Chairman: Samuel Lilly)
- Expenditures in the State Department (Chairman: Daniel Wells Jr.)
- Expenditures in the Treasury Department (Chairman: David Stuart)
- Expenditures in the War Department (Chairman: George W. Kittredge)
- Expenditures on Public Buildings (Chairman: Henry A. Edmundson)
- Foreign Affairs (Chairman: Thomas H. Bayly)
- Indian Affairs (Chairman: James L. Orr)
- Invalid Pensions (Chairman: Thomas A. Hendricks)
- Judiciary (Chairman: Frederick P. Stanton)
- Manufactures (Chairman: John McNair)
- Mileage (Chairman: Andrew J. Harlan)
- Military Affairs (Chairman: William H. Bissell)
- Militia (Chairman: Elijah W. Chastain)
- Naval Affairs (Chairman: Thomas S. Bocock)
- Patents (Chairman: Benjamin B. Thurston)
- Post Office and Post Roads (Chairman: Edson B. Olds)
- Private Land Claims (Chairman: Junius Hillyer)
- Public Buildings and Grounds (Chairman: Francis B. Craige)
- Public Expenditures (Chairman: William H. Kurtz)
- Public Lands (Chairman: David T. Disney)
- Revisal and Unfinished Business (Chairman: Williamson R. W. Cobb)
- Revolutionary Claims (Chairman: Rufus W. Peckham)
- Revolutionary Pensions (Chairman: William M. Churchwell)
- Roads and Canals (Chairman: Cyrus L. Dunham)
- Rules (Select)
- Standards of Official Conduct
- Territories (Chairman: William A. Richardson)
- Ways and Means (Chairman: George S. Houston)
- Whole

=== Joint committees ===
- Amending the Constitution on Presidential and Vice Presidential Elections
- Enrolled Bills (Chairman: Sen. George Wallace Jones)
- The Library (Chairman: Joseph R. Chandler)
- Printing (Chairman: William Murray)
- San Francisco Disaster

== Caucuses ==
- Democratic (House)
- Democratic (Senate)

== Employees ==
=== Legislative branch agency directors ===
- Architect of the Capitol: Thomas U. Walter
- Librarian of Congress: John Silva Meehan

=== Senate ===
- Chaplain: Clement M. Butler (Episcopalian), until December 7, 1853
  - Henry Slicer (Methodist), elected December 7, 1853
- Secretary: Asbury Dickins
- Sergeant at Arms: Robert Beale, until March 17, 1853
  - Dunning R. McNair, elected March 17, 1853

=== House of Representatives ===
- Chaplain: William H. Milburn (Methodist)
- Clerk: John W. Forney
- Doorkeeper: Zadock W. McKnew
- Postmaster: John M. Johnson
- Sergeant at Arms: Adam J. Glossbrenner

== See also ==
- 1852 United States elections (elections leading to this Congress)
  - 1852 United States presidential election
  - 1852–53 United States Senate elections
  - 1852–53 United States House of Representatives elections
- 1854 United States elections (elections during this Congress, leading to the next Congress)
  - 1854–55 United States Senate elections
  - 1854–55 United States House of Representatives elections
