= Fenner Ferguson =

American attorney and politician

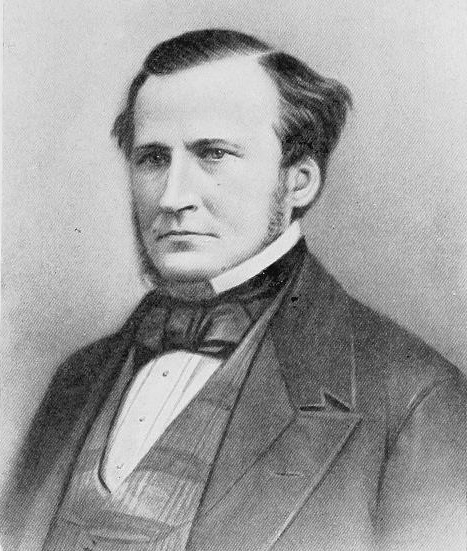

Delegate to the U.S. House of Representatives from the Nebraska Territory's at-large district
- In office March 4, 1857 – March 3, 1859
- Preceded by: Bird Chapman
- Succeeded by: Experience Estabrook

Chief Justice of the Territorial Nebraska Supreme Court
- In office 1854–1857
- Preceded by: Position established
- Succeeded by: Augustus Hall

Member of the Michigan House of Representatives from the Calhoun County district
- In office January 1, 1849 – December 31, 1849
- Preceded by: John Pierce
- Succeeded by: Henry Clark

Personal details
- Born: April 25, 1814 Nassau, New York, U.S.
- Died: October 11, 1859 (aged 45) Bellevue, Nebraska, U.S.
- Party: Democratic

Fenner Ferguson (April 25, 1814 – October 11, 1859) was an American attorney and politician from Nebraska Territory. He was most notable for his service as member of the Michigan House of Representatives in 1849, chief justice of Nebraska Territory from 1854 to 1857, and Delegate to the United States House of Representatives from Nebraska territory (1857–1859).

== Biography ==
Fenner Ferguson was born in Nassau, New York on April 25, 1814, the son of Stephen Ferguson and Dorothy (Palmer) Ferguson. His father Stephen Ferguson owned and operated a farm, and Fenner Ferguson worked on the farm while attending the local schools. After graduating from Nassau Academy and deciding on a career as an attorney, Ferguson studied law at the Albany, New York firm of Coon and Branhall. He was Admission to the bar in 1840 and commenced practice in Albany as a partner in Coon, Branhall, and Ferguson.

In 1846, Ferguson moved to Albion, Michigan, where he continued the practice of law. a Democrat, he served as master in chancery and district attorney. In 1849, he served in the Michigan House of Representatives.

In 1854, President Franklin Pierce appointed Ferguson to serve as chief justice of the Nebraska Territory, and Ferguson relocated to Bellevue, Nebraska. While on the bench, he organized the first district and supreme courts of Nebraska, and assisted the first Territorial legislature in drafting the first code of laws enacted for the government of the Territory. He resigned as chief justice in 1857, having been elected as a Democrat to serve as Nebraska Territory's non-voting delegate in the 35th Congress. Ferguson served from March 4, 1857 to March 3, 1859. He was not a candidate for re-nomination in 1858.

Ferguson died in Bellevue, Nebraska, on October 11, 1859. He was buried at Bellevue Cemetery in Bellevue.

== Family ==
In 1841, Ferguson married Helena E. Upjohn of Troy, New York. They were the parents of four sons, Arthur N., Alfred G., Stephen W. and Charles F.

U.S. House of Representatives
Preceded by Bird Chapman	Delegate to the U.S. House of Representatives from the Nebraska Territory's at-large congressional district 1857–1859	Succeeded by Experience Estabrook
