= Nebraska Territory's at-large congressional district =

- Obsolete district
- Created: 1855, as a non-voting delegate was granted by Congress
- Eliminated: 1867, as a result of statehood
- Years active: 1855–1867

Voters from Nebraska Territory elected delegates to the United States Congress from January 5, 1855, until statehood was achieved in 1867

== Delegates from Nebraska Territory ==
Delegate	Party	Years of service	Cong ress	Electoral history
District established January 5, 1855
Napoleon Bonaparte Giddings (Nebraska City)	Democratic	January 5, 1855 – March 3, 1855	33rd	Elected December 12, 1854. Retired.
Bird Beers Chapman (Omaha City)	Democratic	March 4, 1855 – March 3, 1857	34th	Elected November 6, 1855. Lost re-election.
Fenner Ferguson (Belleview)	Democratic	March 4, 1857 – March 3, 1859	35th	Elected August 3, 1857. Retired.
Experience Estabrook (Omaha)	Democratic	March 4, 1859 – May 18, 1860	36th	Elected October 11, 1859. Lost election contest.
Samuel Gordon Daily (Peru)	Republican	May 18, 1860 – March 3, 1865	36th 37th 38th	Won election contest. Re-elected in 1860 or 1861. Re-elected in 1862. [data missing]
Phineas Warren Hitchcock (Omaha)	Republican	March 4, 1865 – March 3, 1867	39th	Re-elected in 1864 or 1865. Position abolished.
District eliminated March 3, 1867
