= Killian Miller =

American politician (1785–1859)

Member of the U.S. House of Representatives from New York's 12th district
- In office March 4, 1855 – March 3, 1857
- Preceded by: Isaac Teller
- Succeeded by: John Thompson

Personal details
- Born: July 30, 1785 Claverack, New York, U.S.
- Died: January 9, 1859 (aged 73) Hudson, New York, U.S.
- Resting place: Hudson City Cemetery, Hudson, New York, U.S.
- Party: Whig
- Other political affiliations: Democratic-Republican; National Republican

Killian Miller (July 30, 1785 – January 9, 1859) was an American politician and attorney who was a U.S. representative from New York from 1855 to 1857.

== Early life and career ==
Born in Claverack, New York on July 30, 1785, Miller attended Washington Seminary. He then studied law with Jacob R. Van Rensselaer, was admitted to the bar and commenced practice in Livingston, New York in 1806.

Miller became active in politics as a member of the Democratic-Republican Party, and was a Justice of the Peace from 1804 to 1808.

== Military service ==
During the War of 1812 and the years immediately after, Miller served in the New York Militia, first as a Captain of Cavalry in 1st Squadron, 4th Regiment, 3rd Brigade and later as a Major in the 5th Cavalry Regiment.

== Later career ==
During the early 1820s Miller held the position of Master in Chancery, a judicial position in the New York Court of Chancery. In addition, he served as Livingston's Postmaster.

He served as Livingston's Town Clerk from 1823 to 1828, and Town Supervisor from 1829 to 1830.

Miller served as member of the New York State Assembly in 1825 and 1828 and was a member of the National Republican Party, the faction of former Democratic-Republicans who supported John Quincy Adams and opposed Andrew Jackson and Martin Van Buren. He moved to Hudson, New York in 1833 and continued the practice of law. Miller became a Whig when the party was founded in the 1830s.

Miller served as Columbia County Clerk from 1837 to 1840. He was Secretary of the Columbia County Board of Canvassers from 1838 to 1840. (The Board of Canvassers was the body responsible for overseeing the conduct of elections and counting of ballots.)

In 1841 Miller ran unsuccessfully for the New York State Senate, losing to Erastus Corning. From 1845 to 1846 he was one of Hudson's representatives on the Columbia County Board of Supervisors.

Miller was also active in several businesses, including serving on the board of directors of the Hudson and Boston Railroad.

== Congressional career ==
He was elected as a Whig candidate to the 34th Congress (March 4, 1855 – March 3, 1857). Miller was elected as an opponent of extending slavery. Serving in Congress at the end of the Whig Party and the founding of the Republican Party, Miller often sided with opponents of the Franklin Pierce administration, including old-line Whigs, newly-identified Republicans, and the Know Nothing movement. He did not run for reelection in 1856 and resumed his law practice.

== Death and burial ==
Miller died in Hudson, New York on January 11, 1859 and was interred in Hudson City Cemetery.

U.S. House of Representatives
Preceded by Isaac Teller	Member of the U.S. House of Representatives from New York's 12th congressional district March 4, 1855 – March 3, 1857	Succeeded by John Thompson
