= Napoleon Bonaparte Giddings =

American politician (1816–1897)

Napoleon Giddings
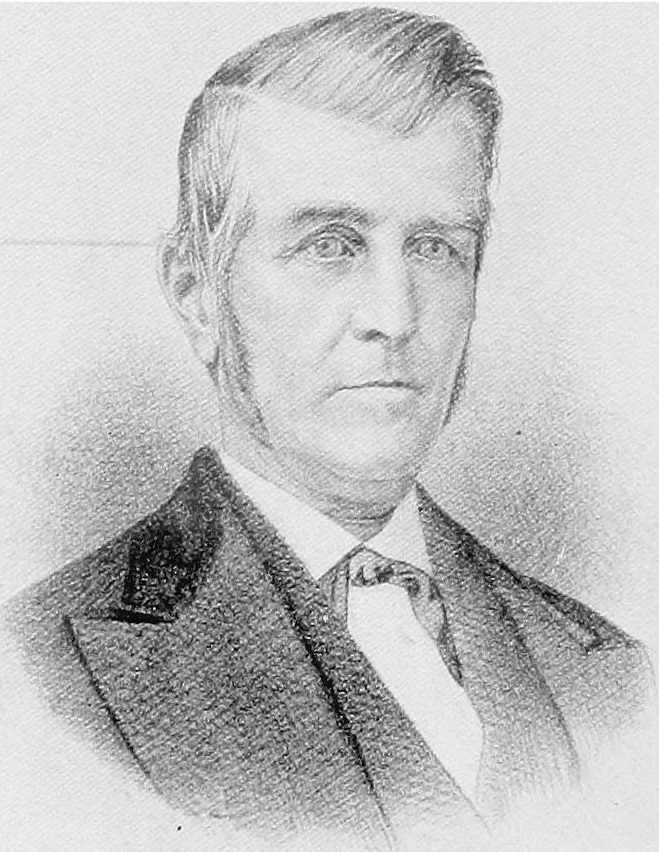

Delegate to the U.S. House of Representatives from the Nebraska Territory's at-large district
- In office January 5, 1855 – March 3, 1855
- Preceded by: Constituency established
- Succeeded by: Bird Chapman

Personal details
- Born: Napoleon Bonaparte Giddings; January 2, 1816 Boonesborough, Kentucky, U.S.
- Died: August 3, 1897 (aged 81) Savannah, Missouri, U.S.
- Party: Democratic

Military service
- Allegiance: United States; Union
- Years of service: 1846–1847; 1865
- Rank: Lieutenant Colonel
- Battles/wars: Mexican–American War; American Civil War

Napoleon Bonaparte Giddings (January 2, 1816 – August 3, 1897) was a United States congressional delegate from the Nebraska Territory. In addition to his political career, Giddings was a captain in the U.S. Army, a political appointee in the Republic of Texas, an editor of a small town newspaper in Missouri, a 49er in the California Gold Rush and a lawyer in Nebraska. After his political career he served as a colonel in the Union Army during the United States Civil War.

== Biography ==
Napoleon Bonaparte Giddings was born near Boonesborough, Kentucky to George and Frances Tandy (Bush) Giddings on January 2, 1816. Giddings moved with his parents to Fayette, Missouri in 1828. He enlisted in the army during the Texas War of Independence and became sergeant major of his regiment. When Texas gained independence he was appointed chief clerk in the auditor's office of the Republic of Texas.

After serving as acting auditor until his resignation in 1838, Giddings returned to Fayette and studied law. He was admitted to the Missouri Bar in 1841 and commenced practice in Fayette. There he was married to Armide Boone, daughter of Rev. Hampton Lynch and Maria Louisa (Roberts) Boone, and a great niece of frontiersman Daniel Boone on November 15, 1842.

In the U.S.-Mexican War Giddings was commissioned as captain of Company A, Second Regiment, Missouri Mounted Volunteers, and served until March 1847. He edited the Union Flag newspaper in Franklin County, Missouri afterwards, and eventually went to California to engage in gold mining. At some point after that he returned to Missouri, settled in Savannah, Missouri and practiced law.

In the early 1850s Giddings moved to Nebraska City and continued the practice of law. When the Territory of Nebraska was formed in 1854 he was elected as a Democrat to the Thirty-third United States Congress and served from January 5 to March 3, 1855. He was not a candidate for renomination in 1854.

Giddings resumed his law practice in Savannah shortly thereafter, and was commissioned a lieutenant colonel of the Fifty-first Regiment, Missouri Volunteer Infantry during the United States Civil War. He served from April 11, 1865, to August 31, 1865, when he was honorably discharged. Giddings died in Savannah on August 3, 1897, and was interred in the City Cemetery there.

U.S. House of Representatives
New constituency	Delegate to the U.S. House of Representatives from the Nebraska Territory's at-large congressional district 1855	Succeeded by Bird Chapman
