= Bird Beers Chapman =

American politician (1821–1871)

Bird Chapman
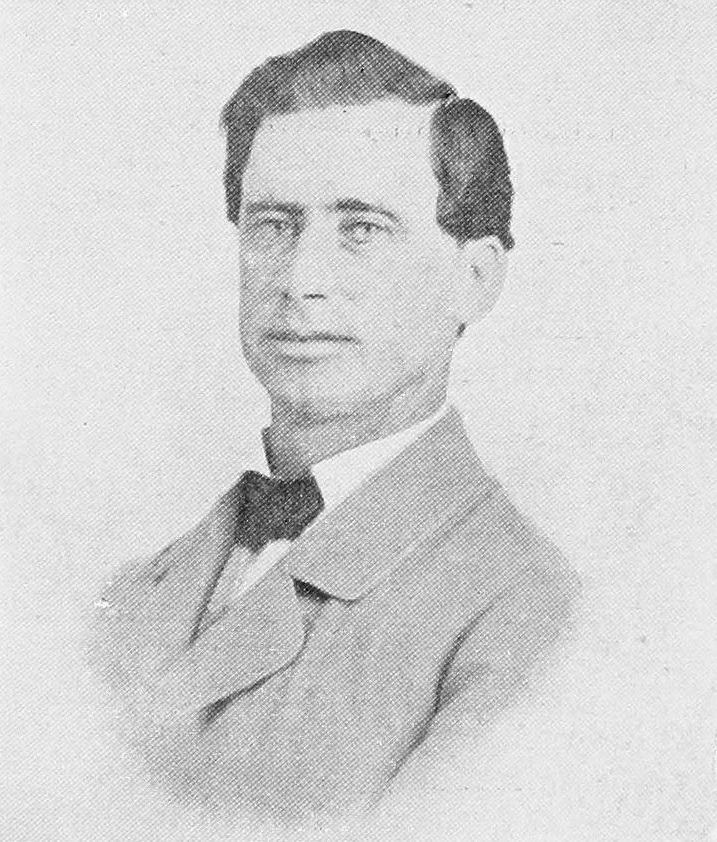

Delegate to the U.S. House of Representatives from the Nebraska Territory's at-large district
- In office March 4, 1855 – March 3, 1857
- Preceded by: Napoleon Giddings
- Succeeded by: Fenner Ferguson

Personal details
- Born: Bird Beers Chapman; August 24, 1821 Salisbury, Connecticut, U.S.
- Died: September 21, 1871 (aged 50) Put-in-Bay, Ohio, U.S.
- Party: Democratic

Bird Beers Chapman (August 24, 1821 – September 21, 1871) was an American politician and lawyer from the Nebraska Territory; born in Salisbury, Connecticut, August 24, 1821; attended the public schools; studied law; was admitted to the bar and commenced practice in Elyria, Lorain County, Ohio; moved to the Territory of Nebraska and settled in Omaha, Nebraska; was editor of the Omaha Nebraskan 1855-1859; elected as a Democrat to the Thirty-fourth Congress (March 4, 1855 – March 3, 1857); unsuccessfully contested the election of Fenner Ferguson to the Thirty-fifth Congress; died at Put in Bay, Ottawa County, Ohio, September 21, 1871; interment in Ridgelawn Cemetery, Elyria, Ohio.

== Sources ==
- United States Congress. "Bird Beers Chapman (id: C000309)". Biographical Directory of the United States Congress.

U.S. House of Representatives
Preceded by Napoleon Giddings	Delegate to the U.S. House of Representatives from the Nebraska Territory's at-large congressional district 1855–1857	Succeeded by Fenner Ferguson
