= Isaac Teller =

American politician

Isaac Teller (February 7, 1799 – April 30, 1868) was an American politician who was a U.S. representative from New York from 1854 to 1855.

== Biography ==
Born in Matteawan, New York (now Beacon), Teller was nephew of Abraham Henry Schenck. He completed preparatory studies and held several local offices.

Teller was elected as a Whig to the Thirty-third Congress to fill the vacancy caused by the resignation of Gilbert Dean and served from November 7, 1854, to March 3, 1855.

He engaged in agricultural pursuits. He died in Matteawan, New York, April 30, 1868. His interment was located in Fishkill Rural Cemetery.

== Sources ==
- United States Congress. "Isaac Teller (id: T000117)". Biographical Directory of the United States Congress.

U.S. House of Representatives
Preceded by Gilbert Dean	Member of the U.S. House of Representatives from New York's 12th congressional district 1854–1855	Succeeded by Killian Miller
