= Zedekiah Kidwell =

American politician

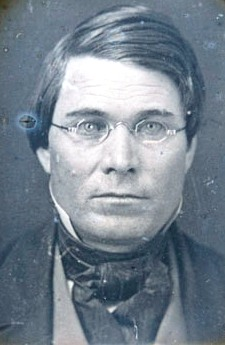

Member of the U.S. House of Representatives from Virginia's 10th district
- In office March 4, 1853 – March 4, 1857
- Preceded by: Charles J. Faulkner
- Succeeded by: Sherrard Clemens

Member of the Virginia House of Delegates
- In office 1849–1850; 1852

Personal details
- Born: January 4, 1814 Fairfax, Virginia, US
- Died: April 27, 1872 (aged 58) Fairmont, West Virginia, US
- Party: Democratic
- Profession: Politician, Lawyer, Judge, Physician, Teacher, Clerk

Zedekiah Kidwell (January 4, 1814 – April 27, 1872) was a nineteenth-century politician, physician, lawyer, teacher and clerk from Virginia and West Virginia. He served two terms in the United States House of Representatives from 1853 to 1857.

== Early life and education ==
Kidwell was born in Fairfax, Virginia. His father was a civil engineer. Kidwell received an English education and studied medicine. He moved to Clarksburg, Virginia (now West Virginia) with his father in 1834 where he taught school and clerked in a store. He resumed studying medicine and graduated from Jefferson Medical College in Philadelphia, Pennsylvania in 1839, commencing practice in Fairfax County, Virginia.

== Career ==
Kidwell moved to Fairmont, Virginia (now West Virginia) and served in the Virginia House of Delegates from 1842 to 1845, studied law and was admitted to the bar in 1849, leaving his medical practice the same year. He was a delegate to the Virginia Constitutional Convention in 1849 and served in the House of Delegates again in 1849, 1850 and 1852. In 1852, he was a Presidential elector for the Pierce and King ticket. That year he was also elected a Democrat to the United States House of Representatives, serving 1853 to 1857.

After leaving Congress, he resumed practicing medicine. He was also a member of the Virginia Board of Public Works from 1857 to 1860. From 1861 to the end of the Civil War, he held a civil office in Richmond.

== Death ==
He died in Fairmont, West Virginia on April 27, 1872, and was interred there in Fairmont Cemetery.

U.S. House of Representatives
Preceded by Charles J. Faulkner	Member of the U.S. House of Representatives from Virginia's 10th congressional district March 4, 1853 – March 4, 1857	Succeeded by Sherrard Clemens
