= John Gaines Miller =

American politician (1812–1856)

Member of the U.S. House of Representatives from Missouri
- In office March 4, 1851 – May 11, 1856
- Preceded by: James S. Green
- Succeeded by: Thomas Peter Akers
- Constituency: 3rd district (1851–1853); 5th district (1853–1856)

Personal details
- Born: November 29, 1812 Danville, Kentucky, U.S.
- Died: May 11, 1856 (aged 43)

John Gaines Miller (November 29, 1812 – May 11, 1856) was a U.S. representative from Missouri.

Born in Danville, Kentucky, Miller attended the common schools and was graduated from Centre College in Danville. He studied law and was admitted to the bar in 1834. He moved to Boonville, Missouri, in 1835. He served as a member of the state house of representatives in 1840.

Miller was elected as a Whig to the Thirty-second, Thirty-third, and Thirty-fourth Congress, and served from March 4, 1851, until his death near Marshall, Missouri, May 11, 1856. He was interred in Mount Olive Cemetery, near Marshall, Missouri.

== See also ==
- List of members of the United States Congress who died in office (1790–1899)

U.S. House of Representatives
Preceded by James S. Green	Member of the U.S. House of Representatives from Missouri's 3rd congressional district 1851–1853	Succeeded by James Johnson Lindley
Preceded by John S. Phelps	Member of the U.S. House of Representatives from Missouri's 5th congressional district 1853–1856	Succeeded by Thomas Peter Akers
