= James J. Lindley =

American politician

James Johnson Lindley

Member of the U.S. House of Representatives from Missouri's 3rd district
- In office March 4, 1853 – March 3, 1857
- Preceded by: John Gaines Miller
- Succeeded by: John Bullock Clark

Personal details
- Born: January 1, 1822 Mansfield, Ohio, U.S.
- Died: April 18, 1891 (aged 69) Nevada, Missouri, U.S.
- Party: Whig

James Johnson Lindley (January 1, 1822 – April 18, 1891) was a U.S. Representative from Missouri.

Born in Mansfield, Ohio, Lindley moved with his parents to Cynthiana, Kentucky, in 1836. He attended Woodville College, Ohio. He moved to St. Louis, Missouri, in 1843. He studied law. He was admitted to the bar in 1846 and commenced practice in Monticello, Missouri.

Lindley was elected circuit attorney in 1848 and 1852.

Lindley was elected as a Whig to the Thirty-third Congress and reelected as a Whig to the Thirty-fourth Congress (March 4, 1853 – March 3, 1857). He was not a candidate for reelection in 1856. He moved to Davenport, Iowa, in 1858 and continued the practice of law. Commissioned to investigate the condition of Iowa troops serving in the Civil War. After the war practiced his profession in Chicago until 1868, when moved to St. Louis, Missouri. He served as judge of the circuit court of the eighth judicial district of Missouri in 1871–1883. He moved to Kansas City, Missouri. He retired from business activities. He died at the home of a son in Nevada, Missouri, April 18, 1891. He was interred in Elmwood Cemetery, Kansas City, Missouri.

U.S. House of Representatives
Preceded by John Gaines Miller	Member of the U.S. House of Representatives from Missouri's 3rd congressional district 1853–1857	Succeeded by John Bullock Clark
