= 1854 United States House of Representatives elections in New York =

The 1854 United States House of Representatives elections in New York were held on November 7, 1854, to elect 33 U.S. Representatives to represent the State of New York in the United States House of Representatives of the 34th United States Congress, and two representatives to fill vacancies in the 33rd United States Congress.

== Background ==
33 U.S. Representatives had been elected in November 1852 to a term in the 33rd United States Congress, beginning on March 4, 1853. Gilbert Dean was appointed to the New York Supreme Court and resigned his seat on July 3, 1854; Gerrit Smith resigned his seat on August 7, 1854; leaving vacancies in the 12th and the 22nd District. The other representatives' term would end on March 3, 1855. The elections were held with the annual State election on the Tuesday after the first Monday in November, about four months before the congressional term began, and a little more than a year before Congress actually met on December 3, 1855.

== Congressional districts ==
The geographical area of the congressional districts remained the same as at the previous elections in 1852, which were apportioned by the New York State Legislature on July 10, 1851. In 1854, the City of Williamsburgh was annexed by the City of Brooklyn, and became the 13th through 16th Ward of Brooklyn. It is unclear if the annexation happened before or after this election.

- The 1st District comprising Queens, Suffolk and Richmond counties; and Kings County except the cities of Brooklyn and Williamsburgh.
- The 2nd District comprising the City of Brooklyn, as it existed before the annexation of the City of Williamsburgh, i.e. the first 12 wards of Brooklyn after the consolidation.
- The 3rd District comprising the 1st, 2nd, 3rd, 5th and 8th Ward of New York City.
- The 4th District comprising the 4th, 6th, 10th and 14th Ward of New York City.
- The 5th District comprising the 7th and the 13th Ward of New York City; and the City of Williamsburgh, from 1854 on the 13th, 14th, 15th and 16th Ward of Brooklyn.
- The 6th District comprising the 11th, 15th and 17th Ward of New York City.
- The 7th District comprising the 9th, 16th and 20th Ward of New York City.
- The 8th District comprising the 12th, 18th, 19th, 21st and 22nd Ward of New York City.
- The 9th District comprising Rockland, Westchester and Putnam counties.
- The 10th District comprising Orange and Sullivan counties.
- The 11th District comprising Ulster and Greene counties.
- The 12th District comprising Dutchess and Columbia counties.
- The 13th District comprising Rensselaer County.
- The 14th District comprising Albany County.
- The 15th District comprising Saratoga, Washington, Hamilton and Warren counties.
- The 16th District comprising Clinton, Essex and Franklin counties.
- The 17th District comprising Herkimer and St. Lawrence counties.
- The 18th District comprising Montgomery, Fulton, Schenectady and Schoharie counties.
- The 19th District comprising Delaware and Otsego counties.
- The 20th District comprising Oneida County.
- The 21st District comprising Chenango, Broome and Cortland counties.
- The 22nd District comprising Madison and Oswego counties.
- The 23rd District comprising Jefferson and Lewis counties.
- The 24th District comprising Onondaga County.
- The 25th District comprising Cayuga and Wayne counties.
- The 26th District comprising Ontario, Seneca, and Yates counties.
- The 27th District comprising Chemung, Schuyler, Tioga and Tompkins counties.
- The 28th District comprising Steuben and Livingston counties.
- The 29th District comprising Monroe County.
- The 30th District comprising Allegany, Genesee and Wyoming counties.
- The 31st District comprising Niagara and Orleans counties.
- The 32nd District comprising Erie County.
- The 33rd District comprising Cattaraugus and Chautauqua counties.

Note: There are now 62 counties in the State of New York. Bronx and Nassau counties had not yet been established. The area of the Bronx was at this time in Westchester County; and the area of Nassau in Queens County.

== Result ==
25 Whigs, 4 Softs, 3 Know Nothings and 1 Hard were elected to the 34th Congress; and 2 Whigs were elected to fill the vacancies in the 33rd Congress. The incumbents Wheeler, Sage, Simmons, Matteson, Bennett, Morgan, Oliver, Pringle, Flagler and Haven were re-elected; the incumbents Walsh, Hughes, Hastings, Carpenter and Fenton were defeated.

1854 United States House election result
District	Whig		Dem./Soft		Dem./Hard		American		also ran	
1st	Harvey W. Vail	2,676	Frederick William Lord	2,227	Daniel B. Allen	2,778	William W. Valk	3,753	Gabriel P. Disosway (Temp.)	1,902
2nd	James S. T. Stranahan	7,927	Jack	20	George Taylor	7,623				
3rd	Guy R. Pelton	4,084	William M. Miner	1,123	George De Witt Clinton	2,569	Guy R. Pelton		Guy R. Pelton (Practical Dem.); William Grandin (Ind.)	
4th	Sanford L. Macomber	821	John Kelly	3,068	Michael Walsh	3,047	John W. Bryce	1,594	Sanford L. Macomber (Practical Dem.)	
5th	George H. Andrews	2,765	Abraham J. Berry	1,964	Ph. Hamilton	2,718	Thomas R. Whitney	3,321	Thomas R. Whitney (Whig secession); R. A. Bailey (Practical Dem.)	
6th	Charles H. Marshall	2,256	John McLeod Murphy	2,533	John Wheeler	5,101	John Wheeler		John Wheeler (Practical Dem.); Charles D. Mead (Ind. Hard)	---- 1,128
7th	Thomas Child, Jr.	6,557	William D. Kennedy	5,094	William D. Kennedy		Thomas Child, Jr.		William H. Wallace (Practical Dem.)	
8th	Abram Wakeman	4,895	Edward B. Fellows	1,699	James L. Curtis	2,969	Abram Wakeman		Joseph W. Savage (Practical Dem.); John M. Reed (Ind.)	
9th	Bayard Clarke	7,764	Benjamin Brandreth	2,540	Whiting	367	Bayard Clarke		Bailey (Ind. Hard); Peck	2,038 ???
10th	Ambrose S. Murray	5,209	Stratton	2,053	Woodward	4,574	Woodward			
11th	Rufus H. King	8,576			Strong	5,042				
12th	Killian Miller	8,376	McClellan	5,540	William H. Wilson	2,486	McClellan			
12th Special	Isaac Teller		Morse		Charles Robinson					
13th	Russell Sage	6,954	Clum	2,075	Alanson Cook	1,971	Russell Sage			
14th	Samuel Dickson	4,638	John V. L. Pruyn	3,244			Harcourt	4,270	Hamilton	2,258
15th	Edward Dodd	6,760	Charles Hughes	2,428	Orville Clarke	6,358			Andrews (Temp.)	2,399
16th	George A. Simmons	5,533	Thomas	1,752	Flanders	1,025	Bailey	3,062		
17th	Henry P. Alexander	5,357	Francis E. Spinner	7,618	Nathaniel S. Benton ?	3,414				
18th	Thomas R. Horton	9,431			Jackson	8,945				
19th	Jonas A. Hughston	6,744	Lewis R. Palmer	6,444	Sturges	1,066			Hawes (Free Soil)	1,339
20th	Orsamus B. Matteson	6,492	Johnson	5,172	Naaman W. Moore	588			Huntington (Whig)	4,759
21st	Henry Bennett	9,757	Crocker	2,077	Tompkins	5,579				
22nd	Andrew Z. McCarty	5,535	Leander Babcock	4,728	Lewis	3,281			Charles G. Case (Free Soil)	3,652
22nd Special	Henry C. Goodwin									
23rd	William A. Gilbert	6,251	Ives	5,645	Brown	1,513			Goodale	77
24th	Amos P. Granger	4,803	Thomas G. Alvord	4,109	Parker	487	B. Davis Noxon	3,409	Mason	
25th	Edwin B. Morgan	7,684	Middleton	6,910	Aldrich	1,296	Middleton			
26th	James L. Seeley	5,304	Andrew Oliver	6,880	Howell	2,163	Andrew Oliver			
27th	John M. Parker	7,918	McDowell	3,467	Stephen B. Cushing	1,964				
28th	William H. Kelsey	11,061	George Hastings	4,450	Gibbs	119	William H. Kelsey			
29th	Davis Carpenter	4,227	John Williams	5,609	Sibley	1,865	John Williams			
30th	Benjamin Pringle	9,510	Laning	3,829	Belden	2,483	Benjamin Pringle		Hull (Free Soil)	692
31st	Thomas T. Flagler	7,190			Baker	1,231	Thomas T. Flagler		Edward I. Chase (Free Soil)	962
32nd	Solomon G. Haven	9,075	Israel T. Hatch	5,388			Solomon G. Haven			
33rd	Francis S. Edwards		Reuben E. Fenton	6,442	Lester	241	Francis S. Edwards	8,359	Reuben E. Fenton (Anti-Nebraska)	

Note: For candidates running on more than one ticket, the number of votes is the total polled on all tickets.

== Aftermath ==
Isaac Teller and Henry C. Goodwin took their seats in the 33rd United States Congress at the beginning of the second session on December 4, 1854.

The House of Representatives of the 34th United States Congress met for the first time at the United States Capitol in Washington, D.C., on December 3, 1855. Thomas Child, Jr., never took his seat, due to a prolonged illness.

Orsamus B. Matteson resigned his seat on February 27, 1857; and Francis S. Edwards and William A. Gilbert resigned on February 28. The three seats remained vacant for the remaining days of this Congress.

== Sources ==
- The New York Civil List compiled in 1858 (see: pg. 67 for district apportionment; pg. 76 for Congressmen)
- Members of the 34th United States Congress
- The Tribune Almanac for 1855 edited by Horace Greeley (page 42)
- OOFICIAL CANVASS 1854 in NYT on December 21, 1854
- Temperance Congressional Convention in the First District in NYT on November 1, 1854
- Whig Congressional Nominations;... Democratic Nominations in NYT on October 18, 1854
- City Nominations for Congress, Assembly, and City and County Offices in NYT on November 1, 1854

== See also ==
- New York state election, 1854
