= List of United States representatives in the 33rd Congress =

This is a complete list of United States representatives during the 33rd United States Congress listed by seniority.

As an historical article, the districts and party affiliations listed reflect those during the 33rd Congress (March 4, 1853 – March 3, 1855). Seats and party affiliations on similar lists for other congresses will be different for certain members.

Seniority depends on the date on which members were sworn into office. Since many members are sworn in on the same day, subsequent ranking is based on previous congressional service of the individual and then by alphabetical order by the last name of the representative.

Committee chairmanship in the House is often associated with seniority. However, party leadership is typically not associated with seniority.

Note: The "*" indicates that the representative/delegate may have served one or more non-consecutive terms while in the House of Representatives of the United States Congress.

== U.S. House seniority list ==
U.S. House seniority
Rank	Representative	Party	District	Seniority date (Previous service, if any)	No.# of term(s)	Notes
1	Linn Boyd	D	KY-01	March 4, 1839; Previous service, 1835–1837.	9th term*	Left the House in 1855.
2	Joshua R. Giddings	W	OH-20	December 5, 1842; Previous service, 1838–1842.	10th term*	
3	George W. Jones	D	TN-06	March 4, 1843	6th term	
4	Alexander H. Stephens	W	GA-08	October 2, 1843	6th term	
5	Thomas H. Bayly	D	VA-01	May 6, 1844	6th term	
6	John S. Phelps	D	MO-06	March 4, 1845	5th term	
7	Frederick P. Stanton	D	TN-10	March 4, 1845	5th term	Left the House in 1855.
8	Thomas S. Bocock	D	VA-05	March 4, 1847	4th term	
9	Thomas L. Clingman	D	NC-08	March 4, 1847; Previous service, 1843–1845.	5th term*	
10	Williamson R. W. Cobb	D	AL-06	March 4, 1847	4th term	
11	Sampson W. Harris	D	AL-03	March 4, 1847	4th term	
12	John L. Taylor	W	OH-10	March 4, 1847	4th term	Left the House in 1855.
13	William A. Richardson	D	IL-05	December 6, 1847	4th term	
14	John McQueen	D	SC-01	February 12, 1849	4th term	
15	William S. Ashe	D	NC-03	March 4, 1849	3rd term	Left the House in 1855.
16	Henry Bennett	W	NY-21	March 4, 1849	3rd term	
17	William H. Bissell	D	IL-08	March 4, 1849	3rd term	Left the House in 1855.
18	Lewis D. Campbell	W	OH-03	March 4, 1849	3rd term	
19	Joseph R. Chandler	W	PA-02	March 4, 1849	3rd term	Left the House in 1855.
20	David T. Disney	D	OH-01	March 4, 1849	3rd term	Left the House in 1855.
21	Cyrus L. Dunham	D	IN-03	March 4, 1849	3rd term	Left the House in 1855.
22	Henry A. Edmundson	D	VA-12	March 4, 1849	3rd term	
23	Thomas J. D. Fuller	D	ME-06	March 4, 1849	3rd term	
24	William T. Hamilton	D	MD-05	March 4, 1849	3rd term	Left the House in 1855.
25	Harry Hibbard	D	NH-03	March 4, 1849	3rd term	Left the House in 1855.
26	John Millson	D	VA-02	March 4, 1849	3rd term	
27	Fayette McMullen	D	VA-13	March 4, 1849	3rd term	
28	Edson B. Olds	D	OH-12	March 4, 1849	3rd term	Left the House in 1855.
29	James L. Orr	D	SC-05	March 4, 1849	3rd term	
30	Paulus Powell	D	VA-06	March 4, 1849	3rd term	
31	John Robbins	D	PA-03	March 4, 1849	3rd term	Left the House in 1855.
32	Richard H. Stanton	D	KY-10	March 4, 1849	3rd term	Left the House in 1855.
33	James Meacham	W	VT-01	December 3, 1849	3rd term	
34	James Abercrombie	W	AL-02	March 4, 1851	2nd term	Left the House in 1855.
35	William Aiken, Jr.	D	SC-02	March 4, 1851	2nd term	
36	Willis Allen	D	IL-09	March 4, 1851	2nd term	Left the House in 1855.
37	William Appleton	W	MA-05	March 4, 1851	2nd term	Left the House in 1855.
38	David J. Bailey	D	GA-03	March 4, 1851	2nd term	Left the House in 1855.
39	John C. Breckinridge	D	KY-08	March 4, 1851	2nd term	Left the House in 1855.
40	John Caskie	D	VA-03	March 4, 1851	2nd term	
41	Elijah W. Chastain	D	GA-05	March 4, 1851	2nd term	Left the House in 1855.
42	William M. Churchwell	D	TN-02	March 4, 1851	2nd term	Left the House in 1855.
43	William Cullom	W	TN-04	March 4, 1851	2nd term	Left the House in 1855.
44	Carlton B. Curtis	D	PA-24	March 4, 1851	2nd term	Left the House in 1855.
45	John G. Davis	D	IN-07	March 4, 1851	2nd term	Left the House in 1855.
46	Gilbert Dean	D	NY-12	March 4, 1851	2nd term	Resigned on July 3, 1854.
47	John L. Dawson	D	PA-20	March 4, 1851	2nd term	Left the House in 1855.
48	Ben C. Eastman	D	WI-02	March 4, 1851	2nd term	Left the House in 1855.
49	Alfred Peck Edgerton	D	OH-05	March 4, 1851	2nd term	Left the House in 1855.
50	Presley Ewing	W	KY-03	March 4, 1851	2nd term	Died on September 27, 1854.
51	Charles J. Faulkner	D	VA-08	March 4, 1851	2nd term	
52	Thomas B. Florence	D	PA-01	March 4, 1851	2nd term	
53	James Gamble	D	PA-15	March 4, 1851	2nd term	Left the House in 1855.
54	John Z. Goodrich	W	MA-11	March 4, 1851	2nd term	Left the House in 1855.
55	Frederick W. Green	D	OH-09	March 4, 1851	2nd term	Left the House in 1855.
56	Benjamin E. Grey	W	KY-02	March 4, 1851	2nd term	Left the House in 1855.
57	Galusha A. Grow	D	PA-14	March 4, 1851	2nd term	
58	Solomon G. Haven	W	NY-32	March 4, 1851	2nd term	
59	Thomas A. Hendricks	D	IN-06	March 4, 1851	2nd term	Left the House in 1855.
60	Bernhart Henn	D	IA-01	March 4, 1851	2nd term	Left the House in 1855.
61	Junius Hillyer	D	GA-06	March 4, 1851	2nd term	Left the House in 1855.
62	George S. Houston	D	AL-05	March 4, 1851; Previous service, 1841–1849.	6th term*	
63	Thomas M. Howe	W	PA-22	March 4, 1851	2nd term	Left the House in 1855.
64	Colin M. Ingersoll	D	CT-02	March 4, 1851	2nd term	Left the House in 1855.
65	Daniel T. Jones	D	NY-24	March 4, 1851	2nd term	Left the House in 1855.
66	William H. Kurtz	D	PA-16	March 4, 1851	2nd term	
67	John Letcher	D	VA-09	March 4, 1851	2nd term	
68	Moses Macdonald	D	ME-01	March 4, 1851	2nd term	Left the House in 1855.
69	Daniel Mace	D	IN-08	March 4, 1851	2nd term	
70	John McNair	D	PA-05	March 4, 1851	2nd term	Left the House in 1855.
71	John G. Miller	W	MO-05	March 4, 1851	2nd term	
72	William Murray	D	NY-10	March 4, 1851	2nd term	Left the House in 1855.
73	Samuel W. Parker	W	IN-05	March 4, 1851	2nd term	Left the House in 1855.
74	George R. Riddle	D	DE	March 4, 1851	2nd term	Left the House in 1855.
75	Zeno Scudder	W	MA-01	March 4, 1851	2nd term	Resigned on March 4, 1854.
76	Origen S. Seymour	D	CT-04	March 4, 1851	2nd term	Left the House in 1855.
77	Charles Skelton	D	NJ-02	March 4, 1851	2nd term	Left the House in 1855.
78	William R. Smith	D	AL-04	March 4, 1851	2nd term	
79	Nathan T. Stratton	D	NJ-01	March 4, 1851	2nd term	Left the House in 1855.
80	Benjamin B. Thurston	D	RI-02	March 4, 1851; Previous service, 1847–1849.	3rd term*	
81	Israel Washburn, Jr.	W	ME-05	March 4, 1851	2nd term	
82	Richard Yates	W	IL-06	March 4, 1851	2nd term	Left the House in 1855.
83	William Preston	W	KY-07	December 6, 1852	2nd term	Left the House in 1855.
84	James C. Allen	D	IL-07	March 4, 1853	1st term	
85	Edward Ball	W	OH-16	March 4, 1853	1st term	
86	Nathaniel P. Banks	D	MA-07	March 4, 1853	1st term	
87	William Barksdale	D	MS	March 4, 1853	1st term	
88	William T. S. Barry	D	MS-02	March 4, 1853	1st term	Left the House in 1855.
89	Nathan Belcher	D	CT-03	March 4, 1853	1st term	Left the House in 1855.
90	Peter H. Bell	D	TX-02	March 4, 1853	1st term	
91	Samuel P. Benson	W	ME-04	March 4, 1853	1st term	
92	Thomas H. Benton	D	MO-01	March 4, 1853	1st term	Left the House in 1855.
93	George Bliss	D	OH-18	March 4, 1853	1st term	Left the House in 1855.
94	Azariah Boody	W	NY-29	March 4, 1853	1st term	Resigned on October 13, 1853.
95	William W. Boyce	D	SC-06	March 4, 1853	1st term	
96	Samuel A. Bridges	D	PA-07	March 4, 1853; Previous service, 1848–1849.	2nd term*	Left the House in 1855.
97	Preston Brooks	D	SC-04	March 4, 1853	1st term	
98	Robert M. Bugg	W	TN-07	March 4, 1853	1st term	Left the House in 1855.
99	Brookins Campbell	D	TN-01	March 4, 1853	1st term	Died on December 25, 1853.
100	Samuel Caruthers	W	MO-07	March 4, 1853	1st term	
101	Ebenezer M. Chamberlain	D	IN-10	March 4, 1853	1st term	Left the House in 1855.
102	George W. Chase	W	NY-19	March 4, 1853	1st term	Left the House in 1855.
103	James Chrisman	D	KY-04	March 4, 1853	1st term	Left the House in 1855.
104	Samuel Clark	D	MI-03	March 4, 1853; Previous service, 1833–1835.	2nd term*	Left the House in 1855.
105	Alfred H. Colquitt	D	GA-02	March 4, 1853	1st term	Left the House in 1855.
106	John P. Cook	W	IA-02	March 4, 1853	1st term	Left the House in 1855.
107	Leander Cox	W	KY-09	March 4, 1853	1st term	
108	Moses B. Corwin	W	OH-08	March 4, 1853; Previous service, 1849–1851.	2nd term*	Left the House in 1855.
109	Francis B. Craige	D	NC-07	March 4, 1853	1st term	
110	Samuel L. Crocker	W	MA-02	March 4, 1853	1st term	Left the House in 1855.
111	Thomas W. Cumming	D	NY-02	March 4, 1853	1st term	Left the House in 1855.
112	Francis B. Cutting	D	NY-08	March 4, 1853	1st term	Left the House in 1855.
113	Thomas Davis	D	RI-01	March 4, 1853	1st term	Left the House in 1855.
114	William B. W. Dent	D	GA-04	March 4, 1853	1st term	Left the House in 1855.
115	Alexander De Witt	W	MA-09	March 4, 1853	1st term	
116	Edward Dickinson	W	MA-10	March 4, 1853	1st term	Left the House in 1855.
117	John Dick	W	PA-25	March 4, 1853	1st term	
118	James F. Dowdell	D	AL-07	March 4, 1853	1st term	
119	William Dunbar	D	LA-01	March 4, 1853	1st term	Left the House in 1855.
120	Augustus Drum	D	PA-19	March 4, 1853	1st term	Left the House in 1855.
121	Norman Eddy	D	IN-09	March 4, 1853	1st term	Left the House in 1855.
122	J. Wiley Edmands	W	MA-03	March 4, 1853	1st term	Left the House in 1855.
123	John M. Elliott	D	KY-06	March 4, 1853	1st term	
124	Andrew Ellison	D	OH-06	March 4, 1853	1st term	Left the House in 1855.
125	William H. English	D	IN-02	March 4, 1853	1st term	
126	Emerson Etheridge	W	TN-09	March 4, 1853	1st term	
127	William Everhart	W	PA-06	March 4, 1853	1st term	Left the House in 1855.
128	E. Wilder Farley	W	ME-03	March 4, 1853	1st term	Left the House in 1855.
129	Reuben Fenton	D	NY-33	March 4, 1853	1st term	Left the House in 1855.
130	Thomas T. Flagler	W	NY-31	March 4, 1853	1st term	
131	John R. Franklin	W	MD-01	March 4, 1853	1st term	Left the House in 1855.
132	William Goode	D	VA-04	March 4, 1853; Previous service, 1841–1843.	2nd term*	
133	Alfred B. Greenwood	D	AR-01	March 4, 1853	1st term	
134	Aaron Harlan	W	OH-07	March 4, 1853	1st term	
135	Andrew J. Harlan	D	IN-11	March 4, 1853; Previous service, 1849–1851.	2nd term*	Left the House in 1855.
136	John S. Harrison	W	OH-02	March 4, 1853	1st term	
137	George Hastings	D	NY-28	March 4, 1853	1st term	Left the House in 1855.
138	Wiley P. Harris	D	MS-04	March 4, 1853	1st term	Left the House in 1855.
139	Isaac E. Hiester	W	PA-09	March 4, 1853	1st term	Left the House in 1855.
140	Clement S. Hill	W	KY-05	March 4, 1853	1st term	Left the House in 1855.
141	Charles Hughes	D	NY-15	March 4, 1853	1st term	Left the House in 1855.
142	Theodore G. Hunt	W	LA-02	March 4, 1853	1st term	Left the House in 1855.
143	Harvey H. Johnson	D	OH-14	March 4, 1853	1st term	Left the House in 1855.
144	Roland Jones	D	LA-04	March 4, 1853	1st term	Left the House in 1855.
145	Laurence M. Keitt	D	SC-03	March 4, 1853	1st term	
146	John Kerr, Jr.	W	NC-05	March 4, 1853	1st term	Left the House in 1855.
147	Zedekiah Kidwell	D	VA-10	March 4, 1853	1st term	
148	George W. Kittredge	D	NH-01	March 4, 1853	1st term	Left the House in 1855.
149	James Knox	W	IL-04	March 4, 1853	1st term	
150	Alfred W. Lamb	D	MO-02	March 4, 1853	1st term	Left the House in 1855.
151	James H. Lane	D	IN-04	March 4, 1853	1st term	Left the House in 1855.
152	Milton Latham	D	CA	March 4, 1853	1st term	Left the House in 1855.
153	Samuel Lilly	D	NJ-03	March 4, 1853	1st term	Left the House in 1855.
154	James J. Lindley	W	MO-03	March 4, 1853	1st term	
155	William D. Lindsley	D	OH-13	March 4, 1853	1st term	Left the House in 1855.
156	Caleb Lyon	W	NY-23	March 4, 1853	1st term	Left the House in 1855.
157	John B. Macy	D	WI-03	March 4, 1853	1st term	Left the House in 1855.
158	Augustus Maxwell	D	FL	March 4, 1853	1st term	
159	Samuel Mayall	D	ME-02	March 4, 1853	1st term	Left the House in 1855.
160	Henry May	D	MD-04	March 4, 1853	1st term	Left the House in 1855.
161	James A. McDougall	D	CA	March 4, 1853	1st term	Left the House in 1855.
162	Henry A. Muhlenberg	D	PA-08	March 4, 1853	1st term	Died on January 9, 1854.
163	Orsamus B. Matteson	W	NY-20	March 4, 1853; Previous service, 1849–1851.	2nd term*	
164	James Maurice	D	NY-01	March 4, 1853	1st term	Left the House in 1855.
165	John McCulloch	W	PA-18	March 4, 1853	1st term	Left the House in 1855.
166	Ner Middleswarth	W	PA-10	March 4, 1853	1st term	Left the House in 1855.
167	Smith Miller	D	IN-01	March 4, 1853	1st term	
168	Edwin B. Morgan	W	NY-25	March 4, 1853	1st term	
169	George W. Morrison	D	NH-02	March 4, 1853; Previous service, 1850–1851.	2nd term*	Left the House in 1855.
170	Matthias H. Nichols	D	OH-04	March 4, 1853	1st term	
171	David A. Noble	D	MI-02	March 4, 1853	1st term	Left the House in 1855.
172	Jesse O. Norton	W	IL-03	March 4, 1853	1st term	
173	Andrew Oliver	D	NY-26	March 4, 1853	1st term	
174	Mordecai Oliver	W	MO-04	March 4, 1853	1st term	
175	Asa Packer	D	PA-13	March 4, 1853	1st term	
176	Jared V. Peck	D	NY-09	March 4, 1853	1st term	Left the House in 1855.
177	Rufus W. Peckham	D	NY-14	March 4, 1853	1st term	Left the House in 1855.
178	Alexander C. M. Pennington	W	NJ-05	March 4, 1853	1st term	
179	Bishop Perkins	D	NY-17	March 4, 1853	1st term	Left the House in 1855.
180	John Perkins, Jr.	D	LA-03	March 4, 1853	1st term	Left the House in 1855.
181	Philip Phillips	D	AL-01	March 4, 1853	1st term	Left the House in 1855.
182	James T. Pratt	D	CT-01	March 4, 1853	1st term	Left the House in 1855.
183	Benjamin Pringle	W	NY-30	March 4, 1853	1st term	
184	Richard C. Puryear	W	NC-06	March 4, 1853	1st term	
185	Charles Ready	W	TN-05	March 4, 1853	1st term	
186	David A. Reese	W	GA-07	March 4, 1853	1st term	Left the House in 1855.
187	David Ritchie	W	PA-21	March 4, 1853	1st term	
188	Thomas Ritchey	D	OH-11	March 4, 1853; Previous service, 1847–1849.	2nd term*	Left the House in 1855.
189	Sion H. Rogers	W	NC-04	March 4, 1853	1st term	Left the House in 1855.
190	Peter Rowe	D	NY-18	March 4, 1853	1st term	Left the House in 1855.
191	Thomas H. Ruffin	D	NC-02	March 4, 1853	1st term	
192	Samuel L. Russell	W	PA-17	March 4, 1853	1st term	Left the House in 1855.
193	Alvah Sabin	W	VT-03	March 4, 1853	1st term	
194	Russell Sage	W	NY-13	March 4, 1853	1st term	
195	Joshua Van Sant	D	MD-03	March 4, 1853	1st term	Left the House in 1855.
196	William R. Sapp	W	OH-15	March 4, 1853	1st term	
197	James L. Seward	D	GA-01	March 4, 1853	1st term	
198	Wilson Shannon	D	OH-17	March 4, 1853	1st term	Left the House in 1855.
199	Henry M. Shaw	D	NC-01	March 4, 1853	1st term	Left the House in 1855.
200	Jacob Shower	D	MD-02	March 4, 1853	1st term	Left the House in 1855.
201	George A. Simmons	W	NY-16	March 4, 1853	1st term	
202	Otho R. Singleton	D	MS-03	March 4, 1853	1st term	Left the House in 1855.
203	Gerrit Smith	D	NY-22	March 4, 1853	1st term	Resigned on August 7, 1854.
204	Samuel A. Smith	D	TN-03	March 4, 1853	1st term	
205	William Smith	D	VA-07	March 4, 1853; Previous service, 1841–1843.	2nd term*	
206	George W. Smyth	D	TX-01	March 4, 1853	1st term	Left the House in 1855.
207	John F. Snodgrass	D	VA-11	March 4, 1853	1st term	Died on June 5, 1854.
208	Augustus R. Sollers	W	MD-06	March 4, 1853; Previous service, 1841–1843.	2nd term*	Left the House in 1855.
209	Hestor L. Stevens	D	MI-04	March 4, 1853	1st term	Left the House in 1855.
210	Christian Markle Straub	D	PA-11	March 4, 1853	1st term	Left the House in 1855.
211	Andrew Stuart	D	OH-21	March 4, 1853	1st term	Left the House in 1855.
212	David Stuart	D	MI-01	March 4, 1853	1st term	Left the House in 1855.
213	John J. Taylor	D	NY-27	March 4, 1853	1st term	Left the House in 1855.
214	Andrew Tracy	W	VT-02	March 4, 1853	1st term	Left the House in 1855.
215	Michael C. Trout	D	PA-23	March 4, 1853	1st term	Left the House in 1855.
216	William M. Tweed	D	NY-05	March 4, 1853	1st term	Left the House in 1855.
217	Charles W. Upham	W	MA-06	March 4, 1853	1st term	Left the House in 1855.
218	George Vail	D	NJ-04	March 4, 1853	1st term	
219	Edward Wade	W	OH-19	March 4, 1853	1st term	
220	Hiram Walbridge	D	NY-03	March 4, 1853	1st term	Left the House in 1855.
221	William A. Walker	D	NY-07	March 4, 1853	1st term	Left the House in 1855.
222	Samuel H. Walley	W	MA-04	March 4, 1853	1st term	Left the House in 1855.
223	Michael Walsh	D	NY-04	March 4, 1853	1st term	Left the House in 1855.
224	Edward A. Warren	D	AR-02	March 4, 1853	1st term	Left the House in 1855.
225	Elihu B. Washburne	W	IL-01	March 4, 1853	1st term	
226	Daniel Wells, Jr.	D	WI-01	March 4, 1853	1st term	
227	John Wentworth	D	IL-02	March 4, 1853; Previous service, 1843–1851.	5th term*	Left the House in 1855.
228	Tappan Wentworth	W	MA-08	March 4, 1853	1st term	Left the House in 1855.
229	Theodoric R. Westbrook	D	NY-11	March 4, 1853	1st term	Left the House in 1855.
230	John Wheeler	D	NY-06	March 4, 1853	1st term	
231	William H. Witte	D	PA-04	March 4, 1853	1st term	Left the House in 1855.
232	Daniel B. Wright	D	MS-01	March 4, 1853	1st term	
233	Hendrick B. Wright	D	PA-12	March 4, 1853	1st term	Left the House in 1855.
234	Felix Zollicoffer	W	TN-08	March 4, 1853	1st term	
	Davis Carpenter	W	NY-29	November 8, 1853	1st term	Left the House in 1855.
	Jehu G. Jones	D	PA-08	February 4, 1854; Previous service, 1851–1853.	2nd term*	
	Nathaniel G. Taylor	W	TN-01	March 30, 1854	1st term	Left the House in 1855.
	Thomas D. Eliot	W	MA-01	April 17, 1854	1st term	Left the House in 1855.
	Henry C. Goodwin	W	NY-22	November 7, 1854	1st term	Left the House in 1855.
	Isaac Teller	W	NY-12	November 7, 1854	1st term	Left the House in 1855.
	Francis Bristow	W	KY-03	December 4, 1854	1st term	Left the House in 1855.
	Charles S. Lewis	D	VA-11	December 5, 1854	1st term	Left the House in 1855.

== Delegates ==
Rank	Delegate	Party	District	Seniority date (Previous service, if any)	No.# of term(s)	Notes
1	John Milton Bernhisel	D	UT	March 4, 1851	2nd term	
2	Joseph Lane	D	OR	March 4, 1851	2nd term	
3	José Manuel Gallegos	D	NM	March 4, 1853	1st term	
4	Henry Mower Rice	D	MN	March 4, 1853	1st term	
	Columbia Lancaster	D	WA	April 12, 1854	1st term	
	John Wilkins Whitfield	D	KS	December 20, 1854	1st term	
	Napoleon Bonaparte Giddings	D	NE	January 5, 1855	1st term	

== See also ==
- 33rd United States Congress
- List of United States congressional districts
- List of United States senators in the 33rd Congress
