= John N. Hungerford =

American politician (1825–1883)

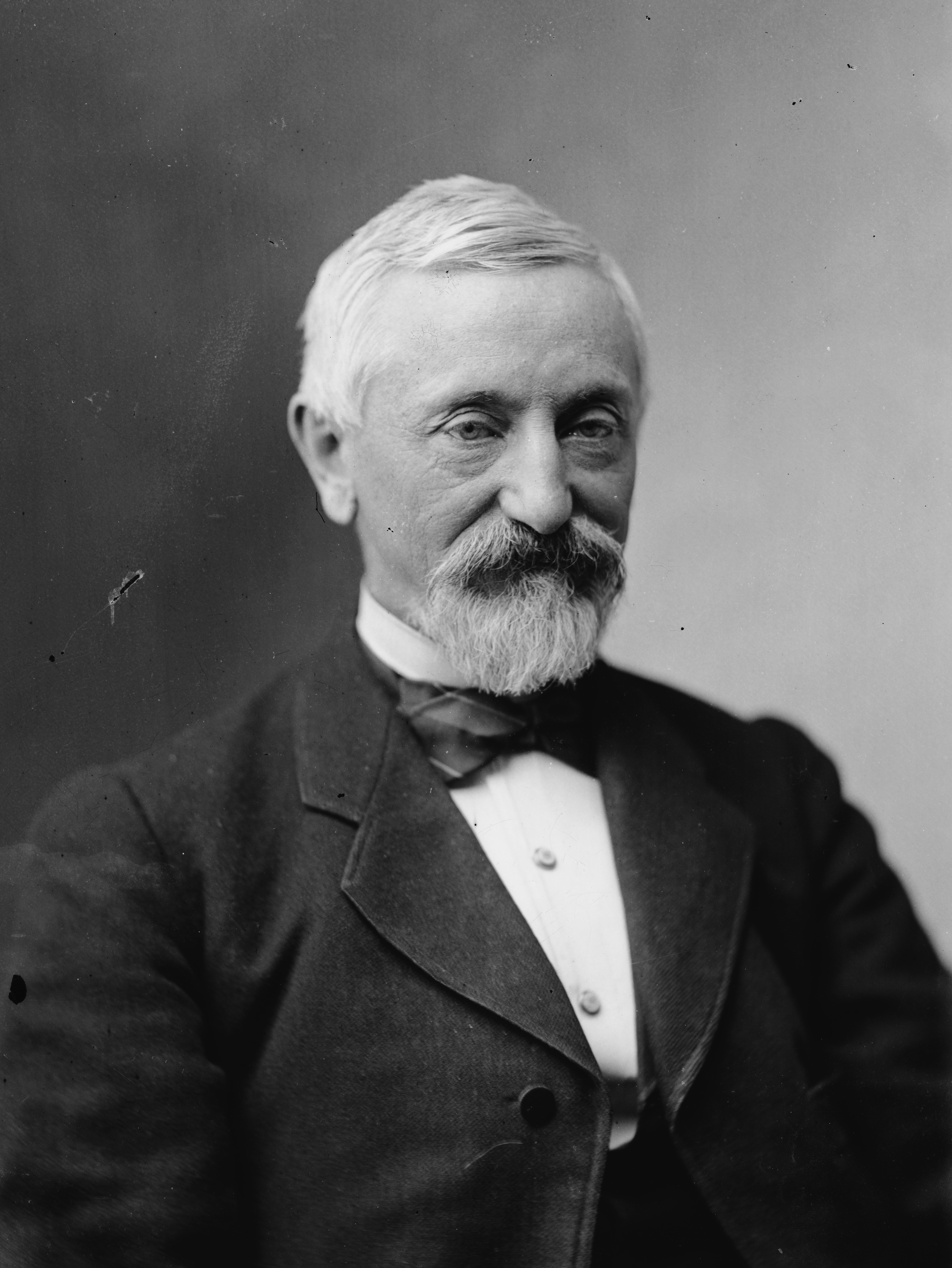

Member of the U.S. House of Representatives from New York's 29th district
- In office March 4, 1877 – March 3, 1879
- Preceded by: Charles C. B. Walker
- Succeeded by: David P. Richardson

Personal details
- Born: John Newton Hungerford; December 31, 1825 Vernon Centre, Oneida County, New York
- Died: April 2, 1883 (aged 57) Corning, New York
- Resting place: Glenwood Cemetery, Watkins Glen, New York
- Party: Republican
- Spouse(s): Mary Woods Gansevoort (1839–1871) and second Susan Medora Marsh (1836-1909)
- Occupation: Merchant, banker, politician

John Newton Hungerford (December 31, 1825 – April 2, 1883) was an American banker, philanthropist, and politician who served one term as a U.S. Representative from New York from 1877 to 1879.

== Early years ==
John Newton Hungerford was born in Vernon Centre, New York to Lot and Celinda (Smith) Hungerford on December 31, 1825. His father was born at Bristol, Connecticut, December 8, 1777, and moved with his grandfather Jacob to New York about 1800. On December 25, 1804, his father married his mother Celinda at Vernon Centre, New York. Lot was a farmer. His family claims descent from Thomas Hungerford of Hartford, who arrived in the New World some time prior to 1640.

John was the youngest child of ten children—five boys and five girls. His siblings were: Sextus Heman (Jan. 14, 1806-May 15, 1867); Caroline Hannah (Feb. 7, 1808-Jan. 23, 1895); Adaline Mary (Oct. 27, 1809-Jan. 3, 1878); Rollin Newell (Mar. 2, 1813-Feb. 5, 1890); Ruth (May 24, 1815- ?); Asahel Smith (Feb. 10, 1817-May 3, 1900); Paulina Rolinda (Feb. 28, 1819- ?); Celinda (Sep. 21, 1821-Jan. 18, 1895); Elias B. (Sep. 1, 1822- ?) Hungerford.

On January 9, 1827, John's father Lot died, leaving his one-year-old son to the care of his mother and siblings. Although John did not remember his father growing up, Lot did imprint upon the family an appreciation for thrift and industriousness, leaving them with his "good and honored name." John grew up on the family farm until age twelve when he moved in with his older brother Sextus Hungerford.

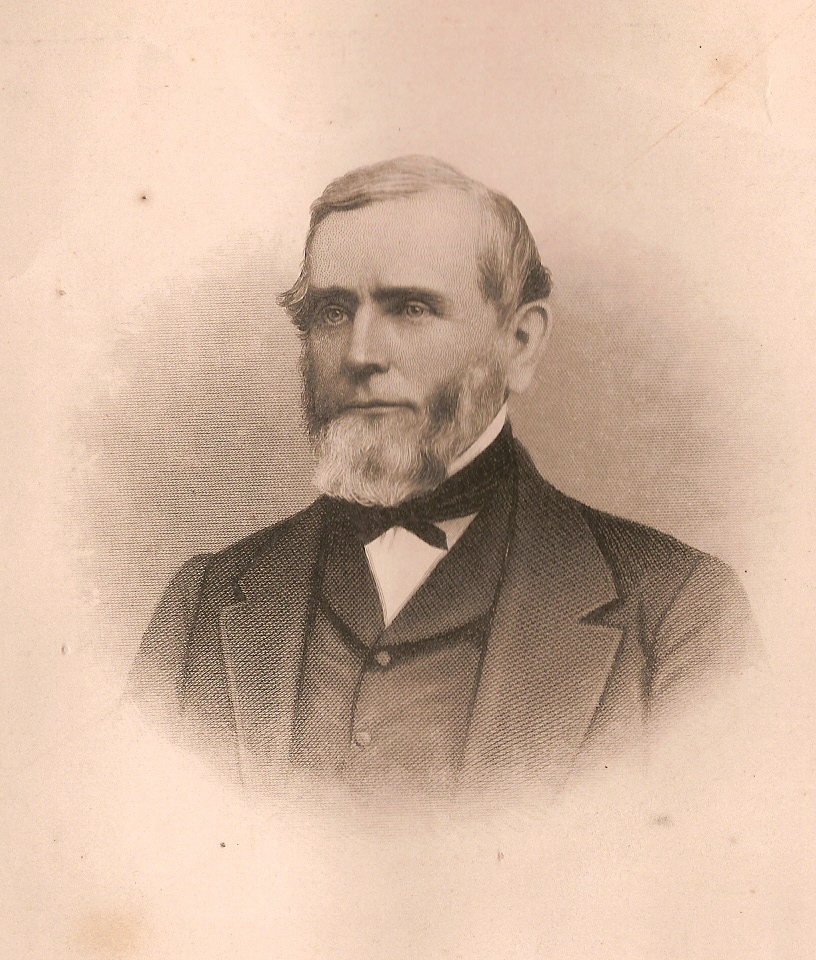
John Newton Hungerford's brother Sextus Hungerford immortalized in a print found in the History of Chautauqua County

== Family ==
John married his first wife, Mary Woods Gansevoort, in Steuben County, New York on June 22, 1859. Mary was the daughter of Dr. and Mrs. Ten Eyck Gansevoort of Bath, Steuben County, New York, and died October 24, 1871, in Corning. John married again on October 18, 1881, in Corning to Mrs. Susan Medora Forrester at the home of his friend and ill-fated attorney Absalom Hadden. Susan was born September 13, 1836, in Bath, New York to Daniel and Susan (______) Aber. No children were born to either marriage.

== Education ==
Hungerford attended common schools until he was twelve years old at which time he moved to Westfield, Chautauqua County, New York to live with his eldest brother Sextus Heman Hungerford. John's philanthropy in later life, as well as other admirable traits, surely were learned by the example his much older brother Sextus exhibited while John was under his care. Sextus involved his younger brother in mercantile pursuits while he was there until 1838 at which time he went to Westfield Academy to prepare for college. Extremely bright, Hungerford excelled in English, Latin and Greek grammar, which gave him a solid foundation for a liberal arts education.

After completing his preparatory studies, John entered Hamilton College in the fall of 1843 as a sophomore. Established as the Hamilton-Oneida Academy in 1793, the trustees of this institution, located in Clinton, New York, successfully petitioned the New York State Board of Regents to approve a charter transforming the school into a college on May 26, 1812. John joined the Fraternity Chi Psi - the Hamilton chapter was known as Alpha Phi. He graduated in 1846.

In the late eighteenth century a portion of the Hungerford family moved from Connecticut to western New York in search of greater economic opportunity; these pioneers and their offspring had some of their brightest sons matriculate at the college on the Hill, an affectionate name for Hamilton College. For example, John Newton Hungerford encouraged his sister, Pauline Hungerford Miner, to enroll her son, Payson Hungerford Miner, at his alma mater; Payson graduated on July 21, 1864. Another nephew, Sextus Hungerford Knight, died in 1865 one year prior to graduating with the Hamilton Class of 1866. Both Payson and Sextus were members of the fraternity, Alpha Delta Phi, founded by Hamilton Class of 1832 alumnus Samuel Eells.

Bank president and future U.S. Congressman, Orville Hungerford of Watertown, New York, sent his son, Richard Esselstyne to join the Hamilton College Class of 1844. Much as John Newton worked in his brother's store prior to taking up his collegiate studies, Richard Esselstyne worked in his father's store before going to Hamilton at age sixteen. In 1988, Orville Hungerford Mann III, known as Terry, the great (x4) grandson of Orville Hungerford, graduated from Hamilton College; his brother Garrett Mann also graduated from New York's third oldest college.

== Religion ==
John Newton Hungerford was baptized at the Vernon, New York Presbyterian church on August 31, 1827. He was raised a Presbyterian and remained throughout his life a faithful church member. The example set by Christ was never far from his mind and permeated his deeds.

While John lived with his older brother in Westfield, New York, the Hungerfords became close with the family of local Presbyterian minister, Reuben Tinker, previously a missionary in Honolulu, the capital of the future state of Hawaii. Reverend Tinker's son, Robert Hall Tinker, discussed numerous boyhood visits to the Hungerford household in his journals, which also detailed his father's ministerial duties, including preaching and calling on his congregants. For example, on Friday, July 16, 1852, Robert entered into his journal: "John Hungerford got his hair cut so that I couldn't pull it." In a journal entry on Friday, August 20, 1852, Tinker recorded: "Mother made John Hungerford the present of an apple for which he seemed very thankful." The journals show that the Tinkers were friends not only with the Hungerfords, but also the politically powerful Patterson family. After John moved to Corning, New York, on November 24, 1854, Tinker, whose father died almost a month earlier, stated in his journal: "Wrote to John Hungerford, telling him that I could not comply with his request to make him a visit." Tinker ended up touring Europe and then moving to Rockford, Illinois where he married a wealthy widow, became mayor, and built his home the Tinker Swiss Cottage, now a museum.

Hungerford was first elected to a leadership position as an Elder in the church at Corning, New York in 1868. On November 20, 1870, the Reverend B.I. Ives solicited his congregation for donations to eliminate debt burdening the First Presbyterian Church of Corning. The building and fixtures cost $43,000.00. Reverend Ives raised $17,000.00 during his Sunday morning service. Not surprisingly, Hungerford pledged by far the largest sum, $2,000.00.

In 1872, Hungerford was elected president of the South Steuben County, New York auxiliary chapter of the American Bible Society.

Hungerford would continue to be honored with re-election to the position of Elder in Corning until he died—the last election being October 19, 1881 in which he was unopposed.

Hungerford strongly supported the Auburn Theological Seminary, at the time located in Auburn, New York and later in 1939 relocated to New York City. Hungerford was appointed to the Board of Commissioners (Presbytery of Steuben), which hired and helped set salaries for the professors at the Seminary. Hamilton College, Hungerford's alma mater, was by far the largest feeder school for the Seminary, supplying 11 students, with Williams College, the next largest, sending 4 students.

== Merchant ==
In 1838, when taken in by his brother, John worked at Hungerford & Miner, the business his brother Sextus was running at the time. The business was purchased in 1837 from Joshua R. Babcock and with his brother-in-law Hiram Jones Miner, run successfully for six years. John replicated this arrangement by working with his brother-in-law George W. Couch in Oriskany Falls, Oneida County, New York from 1846 to 1848. John then turned his focus to banking.

== Banker ==
After ending his working relationship with Mr. Couch, Hungerford went to work briefly at the Bank of Whitestown in Oneida County. In May, 1848, he became cashier of the state-chartered Bank of Westfield, owned by his brother Sextus, who served as its president. John learned the banking business during this period. As it is still true today, bankers had to not only be good with numbers but also had to pay attention to detail: Hungerford excelled at both. According to one contemporary account, on Friday, July 9, 1852, Hungerford noticed that someone had passed counterfeit currency, changing a dollar bill into a ten dollar bill. In July 1864, Sextus Hungerford sold the Bank of Westfield to the newly formed First National Bank of Westfield, capitalized at $100,000.00, where he became a director.

A number of other people in John N. Hungerford's extended family were involved in the banking industry. For example, his cousin and Hamilton College contemporary, Richard Esseltyne Hungerford, established the Security Bank, where he served as president, also serving as a director of the Jefferson County National Bank.

In July, 1854, John N. Hungerford settled in Corning, New York. In August of the same year—at twenty-eight years of age—he set up the George Washington Bank with George Washington Patterson Jr. The two had known each other since their student days at Westfield Academy with Hungerford going on to Hamilton College and Patterson going on to Dartmouth College. These two young bucks, ready to compete for Corning's banking business with the lone bank in town, can be found in the 1855 New York State census living side by side in Almeron Field's Hotel.

John Newton Hungerford's friend and banking partner George W. Patterson Jr.

Patterson graduated from Dartmouth College in 1848. Like Hungerford, he was involved in a fraternity, Psi Upsilon (Zeta Chapter). After graduation, he read law for two years with a Buffalo attorney and then formed a partnership, Waters & Patterson, that made tools such as shovels and hoes. Manufacturing was a tough and grimy business in comparison to banking, where you spent most of the day at a desk counting currency and calculating figures.

The business of banking consists of lending money as well as attracting deposits. Reputation in the community was the paramount characteristic of a successful nineteenth-century banker. Although he had no experience in the banking field, Patterson brought a key asset to the Geo. Washington Bank: powerful connections. His family was woven into the New York political establishment: his father, George W. Patterson, was speaker of the house in the New York State Assembly, lieutenant-governor of New York and eventually a U.S. Congressman; and an uncle, William Patterson, was a U.S. Congressman, as was a cousin Augustus Frank. Such relations, especially Patterson Sr., helped open doors and bring in business to the George Washington Bank. Hungerford had his own connections. An advertisement in the Corning Journal from August 16, 1854, lists his brother's bank, the Bank of Westfield, and his uncle's bank, H.J. Miners Bank of Utica, as references.

Young but mature for his age, Hungerford became bank president and Patterson bank cashier. Their bank had capital of $50,000.00 and started transacting business in the Concert Hall block before moving into its own building.

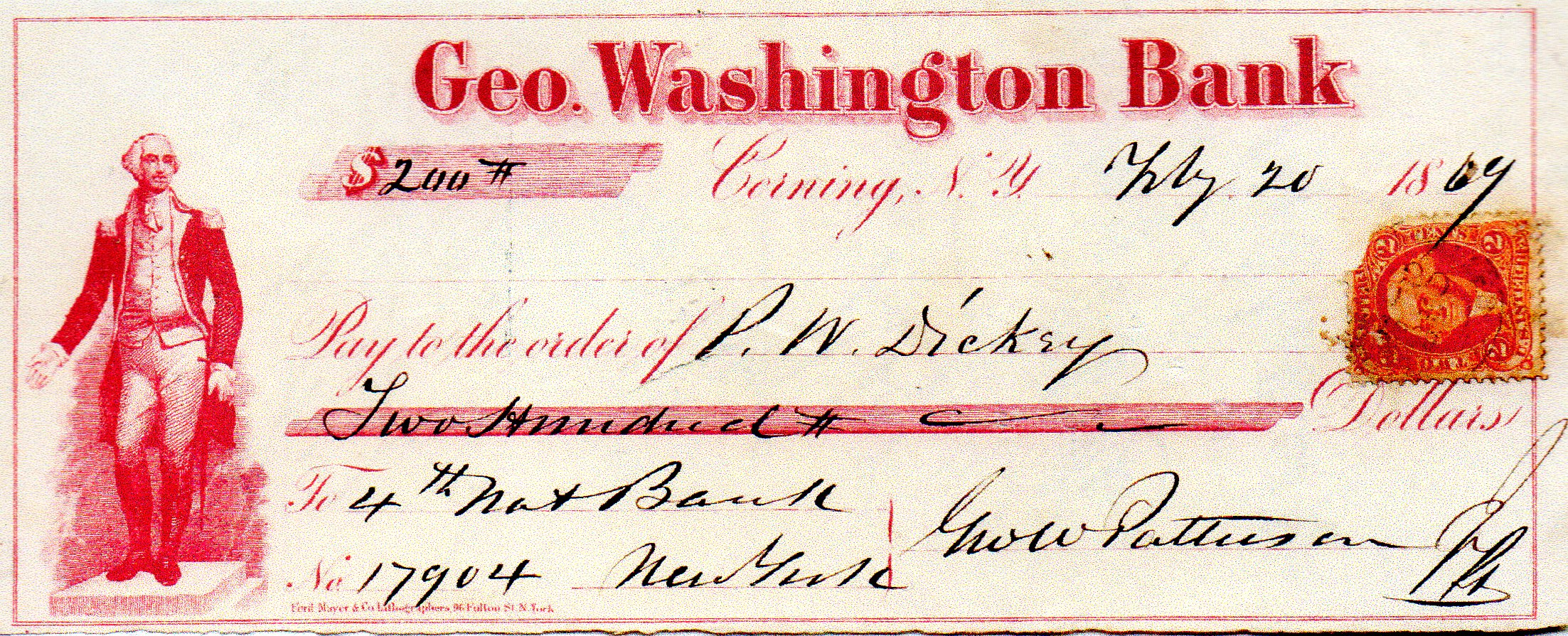
An example of a Geo. Washington Bank check written on February 20, 1869

The two learned that not everyone was worthy of credit. Henry H. Birdsall and his wife took out a mortgage from the Geo. Washington Bank on a property that ended up in foreclosure proceedings in 1857; the matter was unsuccessfully appealed to the New York Court of Appeals in 1876.

Hungerford began to sense that Patterson was a bad businessman. As a result, he sold his ownership interest in the bank to Patterson on December 16, 1858. However, it was not until January 21, 1859, when the New York Legislature passed an Act, actually authorizing Hungerford to transfer his interest in the bank to Patterson; both would be jointly and severally liable for all bank debts incurred prior to the date of passage.

In early 1859 Hungerford established J.N. Hungerford's Bank. He directly competed for the business of his former banking partner. In April 1859, Hungerford wanted to show the community that he was successful on his own so he bought a beautiful home lacking ostentation on 54 West First Street in Corning, New York.

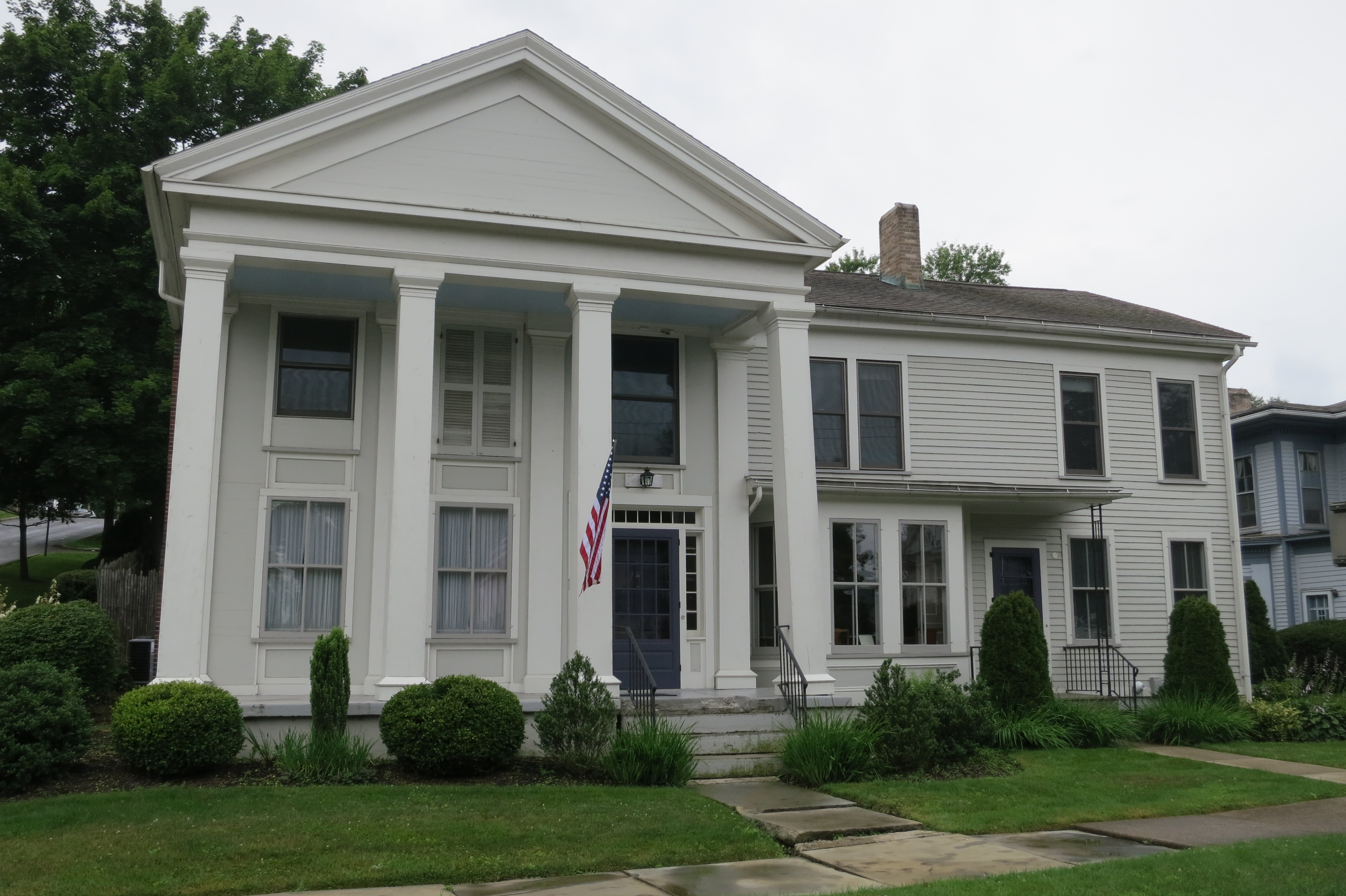
John N. Hungerford's house on 54 West First Street in Corning, New York

In November 1868, Hungerford began purchasing three-month promissory notes pledged against receivables from the Corning Flint Glass Works; this liquidity helped the struggling glass producer meet payroll, purchase raw materials, and refinance other notes that became due. Collecting money for unpaid loans was part of his job. In April 1871, he received an $832.61 judgment from a court against Charles Cullen. One of his larger clients was the Canal Board of the State of New York, which deposited some of its toll money in his bank.

A J. N. Hungerford's Bank check written on April 26, 1864

The bank succeeded because people trusted the name John N. Hungerford.

Hungerford and Patterson continued to collaborate on community matters such as education. While Patterson served as president, Board of Trustees, of the Corning Free Academy, Hungerford served as its treasurer, overseeing the money. Despite differences in financial outlook, these best friends from high school managed to keep their friendship intact throughout the years.

Nevertheless, Hungerford made the right choice in breaking professional ties with George W. Patterson Jr., who took over as the president of the Geo. Washington Bank. On November 2, 1868, Patterson left work, placing his eighteen-year-old teller, George Eaton, in charge of the bank. Some time after three o'clock, a man came in and announced that he was a government detective there to arrest Eaton and Patterson for counterfeiting money. Eaton managed to lock the vault before being handcuffed. The so-called detective placed a revolver to Eaton's head and said to him: "Young man, you may as well know my business at once. I want the money of this bank or I will blow your brains out." Eaton told him to go ahead and a struggle ensued. The two compromised and Eaton, who was still in handcuffs, allowed the man to escape in exchange for his life. Eaton ran around Corning until he eventually found Patterson. By then, of course, the would-be robber escaped. Patterson offered a $100 reward for the assailant's arrest. Patterson was fortunate that he did not find his bank vault empty upon his return.

In 1877, Patterson was criminally prosecuted for defrauding depositors, including encouraging people to deposit money when he knew that they would not be repaid. Foolishly, Patterson did not prepare for trial, hiring a lawyer at the last minute. Hungerford was the first witness to testify about the bank's beginnings. Later testimony showed that Patterson knew his bank was going to fail for the past five years. According to an auditor's report, on January 23, 1875, Patterson's bank had liabilities of $96,669.89, but only $5,931.30 of available resources and $36,498.47 of contingent resources, i.e., money in Patterson's individual account, leaving an overall shortage of $54,240.12. Patterson claimed that he was actually solvent at all times because bank investments in real estate covered any alleged shortages. The presiding judge did not buy his story and found him guilty of fraud.

By now Patterson realized he was going to jail and appealed his conviction, which was overturned and then the remaining charges were dropped in light of the fact that he would be able to pay back 60 cents on the dollar to his creditors. Patterson's house in Corning was auctioned off to pay creditors - an early bid came in at $10,000.00. His father also had to surrender his priority claims against the bank.

Although free, Patterson was financially ruined so he skipped town and returned to Westfield, New York. Patterson helped his sister, Hannah Whiting Patterson, establish the Patterson Library in Westfield, New York, as a memorial to their deceased parents.

Hungerford was not a risk taker, which kept him out of the trouble consuming his former business partner. His approach to making money was described by Professor Edward North at Hamilton College as follows: "In business ventures Mr. Hungerford was so cautious and conservative that his friends sometimes thought him not fully awake to the largest opportunities. His successes were gained honestly, and with no envy of the prosperity of others."

Hungerford's banking activities opened up business opportunities for him. For example, on January 8, 1872, he was elected as a director to the Cowanesque Valley Railroad stretching 12 miles from Lawrenceville, Pennsylvania. to Elkland, Pennsylvania.

Although politics interrupted Hungerford's banking career, he returned to banking once his time in Washington D.C. ended. He would run his bank up until his untimely death.

John Newton Hungerford's signature found on a letter dated February 4, 1861 to the Canal Board regarding funds collected by his bank

== Militia ==
Hungerford was involved with the militia in 1859 as a paymaster. He was commissioned as an officer on June 8, 1859, in the 60th Infantry Regiment, 20th Brigade, of the 7th Division. His length of duty and the extent of his involvement with the militia aren't known. He was also appointed to a committee in Corning to raise funds to help support families whose sons enlisted in the Union forces during the Civil War.

== Politician ==
John Newton Hungerford was an avid member of the late President Lincoln's political party, serving four years as the Chairman of the Steuben County Republican Committee. He went on to serve as delegate to the Republican National Convention in 1872. Hungerford was then elected as a Republican to the Forty-fifth Congress (March 4, 1877 – March 3, 1879). He garnered 21,087 votes while his Democratic rival, E.D. Loveridge, received 17,973.

A banker by profession, Hungerford was well aware of the importance of maintaining the value of money as a medium of exchange. To him, the laborer and the capitalist were dependent on each other and needed to be confident in the monetary system, which rewarded each for his services and contributions. On February 21, 1878, he addressed the U.S. House of Representatives regarding a bill seeking to restore silver dollars as legal tender. In his speech, he called for a stable currency in which bank notes should only be redeemed for a set amount of gold or silver as determined at the international level. Overall, he favored a gold standard. That said, he informed the chamber as follows: "What this country needs to-day is men in public as well as private station, who will not yield to every popular clamor but stand firmly and fearlessly for an honest currency be it silver, gold or paper, so that individual rights and national obligations may be preserved and maintained."

A learned man, Hungerford placed much emphasis on education. Hence, it was not surprising that his main focus in Congress was serving on the Committee of Education and Labor. After his short stint on Capital Hill, he returned to Corning, New York to resume his banking business.

== Philanthropist ==
In order to donate money one must have a wealth base. In Hungerford's case that wealth primarily derived from banking as noted above. This self-made man was not one to waste funds. According to the 1865 New York Census, he had a boarder, William Haggerty stay in his house, which offset the cost of the household servant, Ellen McCarty. Furthermore, the census showed that he owned a 450-acre farm, valued at $7,000.00, yielding, meat, apples, wheat, butter, milk, and other foodstuffs that ended up in the Hungerford kitchen or at market. Another way he saved money was not having children to support. As a result, he was able to accumulate a lot of wealth to be used for philanthropic purposes.

Hungerford cherished his years at Hamilton College so much that he donated between $10,000 and $40,000 in 1872, according to contemporary sources, which was used to renovate and improve the South Hall building on campus. The grateful recipients of his generosity went on to rename the hall "Hungerford Hall." This dormitory was torn down in 1906 and replaced by another building, New South College, now known as South Residence Hall.

19th-century photo of Hungerford Hall at Hamilton College

On July 13, 2013, the Hungerford family and guests as well as members of the Hamilton College administration unveiled a plaque in the entryway of South Residence Hall commemorating John N. Hungerford's contributions to the college, including Hungerford Hall.

From 1871 to 1883, Hungerford served as a trustee at Hamilton College. In 1878, he sat on the committee that decided which students at Hamilton would be awarded the McKinney Prizes in Extemporaneous Debate based on the question: "Is Education preferable to Property as a Qualification for the Right of Suffrage in the United States?" In addition to his contributions to his alma mater, he served as a trustee of Elmira Female College, now known as Elmira College. He also financially supported the Auburn Theological Seminary. John's final contributions to Hamilton College ($25,000) and the Elmira Female College ($5,000) were donations made posthumously via his will.

The more entrepreneurial members of the Hungerford family at that time strongly believed in giving back to the community by donating money to worthy causes. Although he did not attend Hamilton College, General Solon Dexter Hungerford, a second cousin to John, established a scholarship fund there that was valued at $1,000.00 in 1881. General Hungerford also founded a high school known as the Hungerford Collegiate Institute in Adams, New York. As was common with many members of the Hungerford family in Western New York, the General made his money to support his philanthropy in the banking industry—starting three banks in and around Jefferson County, New York. (Hamilton College's president at the time, Samuel Ware Fisher, D.D., LL.D., 1858–66, attended the September 7, 1864 inauguration ceremonies of Hungerford Collegiate Institute.)

In 1866 a branch of the Young Men's Christian Association was organized in Corning with J. N. Hungerford as the president. In 1873, John served as the treasurer of the Corning Board of Education and the treasurer of the Corning Library Board. In addition, he served for many years as treasurer of the Corning Free Academy. He also served on the Finance Committee for the Centennial Celebration of the Revolutionary War Battle of Newtown (Elmira, New York) on August 29, 1879.

== Death ==
Hungerford died at his house in Corning, New York, on the evening of April 2, 1883. A case of dysentery led to blood poisoning, which killed him. As her husband's health declined in his final days, Susan Aber Hungeford, John's second wife, became ill while pondering widowhood again. John was interred in the Glenwood Cemetery, in Watkins Glen, New York next to his first wife, Mary W. Gansevoort, and some of her family members. J.N. Hungerford's Bank was closed after its founder died. The settlement of the estate of John Newton Hungerford was a messy affair which caused one of his executors—Absalom Hadden, Esq.—to eventually commit suicide on October 7, 1889.

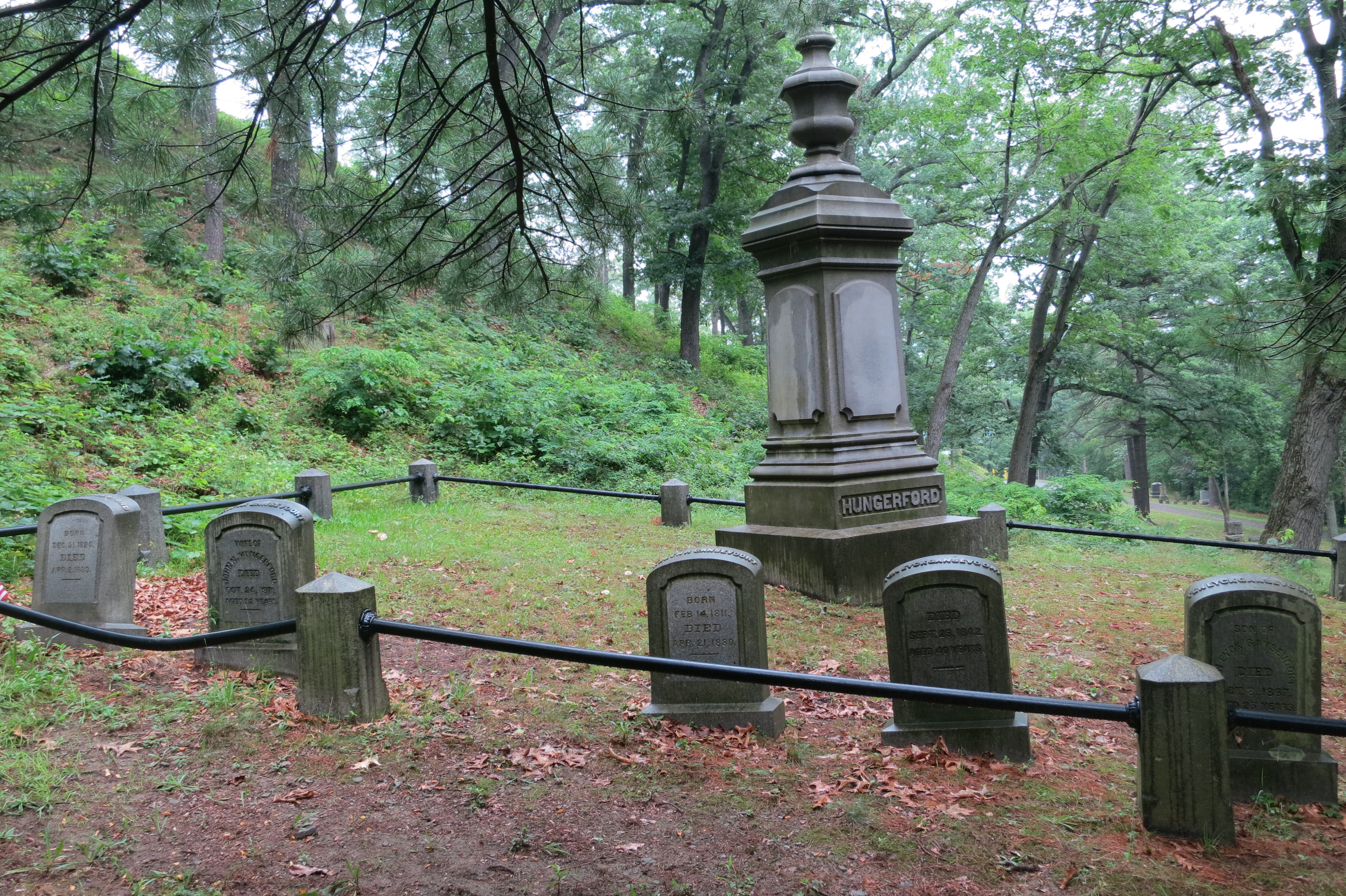
Grave of John N. Hungerford in Glenwood Cemetery, Watkins Glen, New York

For over six years Hadden tried to collect money owed to Hungerford's estate, an immensely stressful task. The estate was depleted in part because it paid a $25,000 bequest to Hamilton College as well as $5,000 to Elmira College. One business debtor in Elmira owed Hungerford's bank $100,000 with security of only $7,500; Hadden was able to levee enough N.Y. and Pennsylvania timberland owned by the bankrupt debtor to reduce its outstanding to $60,000. Creditors kept clamoring for repayment though. At his summer camp on Lake Keuka, Hadden hung himself, thereby ending his role as Hungerford's executor. If Hungerford, the skillful banker, had lived, the tragedy would have been averted.

John N. Hungerford's character was summed up as that of a man "of deep and earnest conviction, firm in upholding what he believed to be right, a man of integrity and uprightness in his relations and dealings, charitable in his judgment of the views and deeds of others. He was of a solid nature, which attached to him many warm and lasting friends and his passing left behind a fragrant memory."

== Sources ==
- United States Congress. "John N. Hungerford (id: H000966)". Biographical Directory of the United States Congress.

U.S. House of Representatives
Preceded by Charles C. B. Walker	Member of the U.S. House of Representatives from New York's 29th congressional district 1877–1879	Succeeded by David P. Richardson
