= Ransom L. Richardson =

American politician

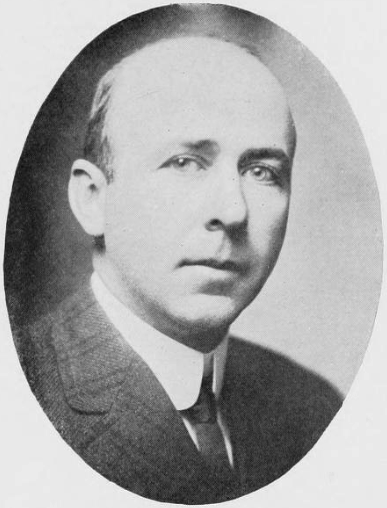

Member of the New York State Assembly
- In office 1912
- Constituency: Allegany County

Personal details
- Born: Ransom Lloyd Richardson; January 25, 1873 Angelica, New York, US
- Died: March 11, 1959 (aged 86) Fillmore, New York, US
- Resting place: Pine Grove Cemetery
- Party: Republican
- Parents: David P. Richardson (father); Julia S. Richardson (mother)
- Education: Cornell Law School
- Occupation: Lawyer, politician

Ransom Lloyd Richardson (January 25, 1873 – March 11, 1959) was an American lawyer and politician from New York.

== Life ==
Richardson was born on January 25, 1873, in Angelica, New York, the son of David P. and Julia S. Richardson.

Richardson attended the local village school. He was in the public schools in Washington, D.C. when his father was in Congress. He then went to the Newton Collegiate Institute in Newton, New Jersey. He graduated from Wilson Academy in Angelica in 1891. He then went to Cornell Law School, graduating from there in 1895. He was admitted to the bar in 1894, and in 1895 he opened a law office in Fillmore and practiced law there. His 1895 thesis from Cornell, Mistake, was about mistakes in court.

Richardson served as town supervisor from 1906 to 1911. In 1911, he was elected to the New York State Assembly as a Republican, representing Allegany County. He served in the Assembly in 1912 and 1913.

Richardson practiced law for over 57 years. He was married to Ruth L. Their children were Mrs. P. Austin Bleyer of Rochester, David P. of Fillmore, Ransom L. of Flint, Michigan, and Warren S. of Washington Grove, Maryland.

Richardson died at home on March 11, 1959. He was buried in Pine Grove Cemetery in Fillmore.

New York State Assembly
Preceded by Jesse S. Phillips	New York State Assembly; Allegany County; 1912–1913	Succeeded by Elmer E. Ferry
