= Robert L. Rose =

American politician

Member of the U.S. House of Representatives from New York's 29th district
- In office March 4, 1847 – March 3, 1851
- Preceded by: Charles H. Carroll
- Succeeded by: Jerediah Horsford

Personal details
- Born: October 12, 1803 Geneva, New York, U.S.
- Died: March 14, 1877 (aged 73) Funkstown, Maryland, U.S.
- Party: Whig

Robert Lawson Rose (October 12, 1804 – March 14, 1877) was a U.S. representative from New York, son of Robert Selden Rose and son-in-law of Nathaniel Allen.

Born in Geneva, New York, Rose received limited schooling as a youth. He moved to Allens Hill, New York and engaged in agricultural pursuits. He held several local offices, and then was elected as a Whig to the Thirtieth and Thirty-first Congresses (March 4, 1847 – March 3, 1851). Afterwards he resumed agricultural pursuits and returned to Geneva, New York. He subsequently moved to Pleasant Grove, near Funkstown, Maryland, in 1868, and engaged in the manufacture of paper until his death there. He was interred in Rose Hill Cemetery (Maryland), Hagerstown, Maryland.

== Sources ==
- United States Congress. "Robert L. Rose (id: R000438)". Biographical Directory of the United States Congress.

U.S. House of Representatives
Preceded by Charles H. Carroll	Member of the U.S. House of Representatives from New York's 29th congressional district 1847–1851	Succeeded by Jerediah Horsford
