= Jerediah Horsford =

American politician

Member of the New York State Assembly for Livingston County
- In office 1831–1831

Member of the U.S. House of Representatives from New York's 29th district
- In office March 4, 1851 – March 3, 1853
- Preceded by: Robert L. Rose
- Succeeded by: Azariah Boody

Personal details
- Born: March 8, 1791 Charlotte, Vermont, U.S.
- Died: January 14, 1875 (aged 83) Livonia, New York, U.S.
- Resting place: Moscow Cemetery, now in Leicester, New York, U.S.
- Party: Anti-Masonic (1831); Whig (1851-1853)
- Children: Eben Norton Horsford

Jerediah Horsford (March 8, 1791 – January 14, 1875) was an American politician from New York.

== Life ==
Jerediah Horsford was born on 8 March 1791 in Charlotte, Vermont, to Roger Horsford and Mary (Brown) Horsford. He attended the common schools in Charlotte, and then engaged in agricultural pursuits. He served during the War of 1812, taking part in the defense of Burlington, Vermont. He later moved to Genesee County, New York, where he served as an officer in a unit which took part in the Battle of Lundy's Lane.

In 1815, he went to Moscow, New York as a missionary to the Seneca Indians. In 1818 he moved to Mount Morris, New York, where he was a farmer. He was a pioneer in scientific farming methods, an active member of several agricultural societies, and the inventor of an animal feed named Horsford's Cattle Food.

He remained in the New York Militia, and rose to colonel and commander of the regiment based in Livingston County.

He was an Anti-Masonic member of the New York State Assembly (Livingston Co.) in 1831.

Horsford was elected as a Whig to the 32nd United States Congress, holding office from 4 March 1851 to 3 March 1853.

He moved to Livonia, New York in 1863. He died in Livonia on 14 January 1875.

His children included inventor and scientist Eben Norton Horsford.

== Sources ==
- United States Congress. "Jerediah Horsford (id: H000796)". Biographical Directory of the United States Congress.

U.S. House of Representatives
Preceded by Robert L. Rose	Member of the U.S. House of Representatives from New York's 29th congressional district 1851–1853	Succeeded by Azariah Boody
