= Elmer E. Ferry =

American politician

Elmer Ellsworth Ferry (August 2, 1861 – May 30, 1932) was an American farmer and politician from New York.

== Life ==
Ferry was born on August 2, 1861, in Almond, New York.

Ferry attended the district schools and spent a year in Alfred University. He took over the family farm when his father was discouraged by the poor results from the farming. He used modern methods and new business strategies to turn the farm deep in debt into a successful dairy of Holstein cattle.

In 1913, Ferry was elected to the New York State Assembly as a Republican, representing Allegany County. He served in the Assembly in 1914 and 1915.

Ferry was a member of the Freemasons, the Royal Arch Masonry, the Knights Templar, the Shriners, the Almond board of education, and the Almond Grange. He was treasurer of the Woodlawn Cemetery Association. He was a member of the Presbyterian Church as well as its deacon. He was also a founder of the Almond Library, donating a number of books for it. He was married to Florence Collins of Arkport. Their children were Claude, Elsie Grace, Helen Marr, Mildred, and Hiram.

Ferry died in Bethesda Hospital in Hornell from pneumonia that set in after an operation on May 30, 1932. He was buried in Woodlawn Cemetery in Almond.

New York State Assembly
Preceded by Ransom L. Richardson	New York State Assembly; Allegany County; 1914–1915	Succeeded by William Duke Jr.
