= List of United States senators in the 33rd Congress =

This is a complete list of United States senators during the 33rd United States Congress listed by seniority from March 4, 1853, to March 3, 1855.

Order of service is based on the commencement of the senator's first term. Behind this is former service as a senator (only giving the senator seniority within their new incoming class), service as vice president, a House member, a cabinet secretary, or a governor of a state. The final factor is the population of the senator's state.

Senators who were sworn in during the middle of the Congress (up until the last senator who was not sworn in early after winning the November 1854 election) are listed at the end of the list with no number.

== Terms of service ==
Class	Terms of service of senators that expired in years
Class 3	Terms of service of senators that expired in 1855 (AL, AR, CA, CT, FL, GA, IA, IL, IN, KY, LA, MD, MO, NC, NH, NY, OH, PA, SC, VT, and WI.)
Class 1	Terms of service of senators that expired in 1857 (CA, CT, DE, FL, IN, MA, MD, ME, MI, MN, MO, MS, NJ, NY, OH, PA, RI, TN, TX, VA, VT, and WI.)
Class 2	Terms of service of senators that expired in 1859 (AL, AR, DE, GA, IA, IL, KY, LA, MA, ME, MI, MS, NC, NH, NJ, RI, SC, TN, TX, and VA.)

== U.S. Senate seniority list ==
U.S. Senate seniority
Rank	Senator (party-state)	Seniority date	Other factors
1	James Alfred Pearce (D-MD)	March 4, 1843	Former representative
2	David Rice Atchison (D-MO)	October 14, 1843	
3	Jesse D. Bright (D-IN)	March 4, 1845	Former lieutenant governor
4	Thomas Jefferson Rusk (D-TX)	February 21, 1846	
5	Samuel Houston (D-TX)	February 26, 1846	Former representative, former governor
6	George Edmund Badger (W-NC)	November 26, 1846	
7	Andrew Pickens Butler (D-SC)	December 4, 1846	
8	James M. Mason (D-VA)	January 21, 1847	Former representative
9	Stephen A. Douglas (D-IL)	March 4, 1847	Former representative
10	Robert M. T. Hunter (D-VA)	March 4, 1847	Former representative
11	John Bell (D-TN)	November 22, 1847	Former representative
12	Solon Borland (D-AR)	March 30, 1848	
13	William K. Sebastian (D-AR)	May 12, 1848	
14	Henry Dodge (D-WI)	June 8, 1848	Former delegate
15	Hannibal Hamlin (D-ME)	June 8, 1848	Former representative
16	Isaac Pigeon Walker (D-WI)	June 8, 1848	
17	Augustus Caesar Dodge (D-IA)	December 7, 1848	Former delegate
18	George Wallace Jones (D-IA)	December 7, 1848	Former delegate
19	William H. Seward (R-NY)	March 4, 1849	Former governor
20	Lewis Cass (D-MI)	March 4, 1849	
21	Truman Smith (D-CT)	March 4, 1849	Former representative
22	Jackson Morton (W-FL)	March 4, 1849	
23	Moses Norris, Jr. (D-NH)	March 4, 1849	Former representative
24	Salmon P. Chase (R-OH)	March 4, 1849	
25	Pierre Soulé (D-LA)	March 4, 1849	
26	James Cooper (W-PA)	March 4, 1849	
27	William Dawson (W-GA)	March 4, 1849	Former representative
28	James Shields (D-IL)	October 27, 1849	
29	Thomas Pratt (D-MD)	January 12, 1850	
30	William M. Gwin (D-CA)	September 9, 1850	Former representative
31	Solomon Foot (W-VT)	March 4, 1851	
32	James A. Bayard Jr. (D-DE)	March 4, 1851	
33	Stephen Mallory (D-FL)	March 4, 1851	
34	Henry S. Geyer (W-MO)	March 4, 1851	
35	Richard Brodhead (D-PA)	March 4, 1851	
36	Charles T. James (D-RI)	March 4, 1851	
37	James C. Jones (D-TN)	March 4, 1851	
38	Benjamin Wade (R-OH)	March 15, 1851	
39	Charles Sumner (LR-MA)	April 11, 1851	
40	John M. Clayton (R-NY)	December 1, 1851	
41	John B. Weller (LD-CA)	January 30, 1852	
42	Stephen Adams (D-MS)	March 17, 1852	
43	Isaac Toucey (D-CT)	May 12, 1852	
44	Archibald Dixon (W-KY)	September 1, 1852	
45	Samuel Shethar Phelps (W-VT)	January 17, 1853	
46	John Pettit (D-IN)	January 18, 1853	
47	John R. Thomson (D-NJ)	March 4, 1853	
48	Robert Toombs (D-GA)	March 4, 1853	Former representative
49	Judah P. Benjamin (D-LA)	March 4, 1853	
50	Josiah J. Evans (D-SC)	March 4, 1853	
51	Charles E. Stuart (D-MI)	March 4, 1853	Former representative
52	John B. Thompson (KN-KY)	March 4, 1853	Former representative
53	John Middleton Clayton (W-DE)	March 4, 1853	
54	William Wright (D-NJ)	March 4, 1853	
55	Edward Everett (W-MA)	March 4, 1853	Former representative, former governor
56	Charles Gordon Atherton (D-NH)	March 4, 1853	Former representative
	Robert Ward Johnson (D-AR)	July 6, 1853	Former representative
	Philip Allen (D-RI)	July 20, 1853	Former governor
	Clement Claiborne Clay (D-AL)	November 29, 1853	
	Jared W. Williams (D-NH)	November 29, 1853	Former representative, former governor
	John Slidell (D-LA)	December 5, 1853	Former representative
	Albert G. Brown (D-MS)	January 7, 1854	Former representative, former governor
	William P. Fessenden (R-ME)	February 10, 1854	Former representative
	Francis Gillette (D-CT)	May 24, 1854	
	Julius Rockwell (W-MA)	June 3, 1854	Former representative
	Lawrence Brainerd (W-VT)	October 14, 1854	
	David Settle Reid (D-NC)	December 6, 1854	Former representative, former governor
	John S. Wells (D-NH)	January 16, 1855	
	Henry Wilson (R-MA)	January 31, 1855	

== See also ==
- 33rd United States Congress
- List of United States representatives in the 33rd Congress
