= David P. Richardson (New York politician) =

American politician (1833–1904)

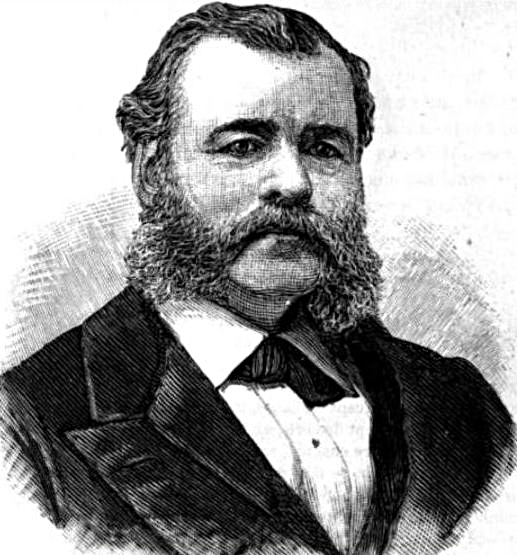

Member of the U.S. House of Representatives from New York's 29th district
- In office March 4, 1877 – March 3, 1879
- Preceded by: John N. Hungerford
- Succeeded by: John Arnot Jr.

Personal details
- Born: May 28, 1833 Macedon, New York, U.S.
- Died: June 21, 1904 (aged 71) Angelica, New York, U.S.
- Resting place: Angelica Cemetery
- Party: Republican

David Plunket Richardson (May 28, 1833 – June 21, 1904) was a U.S. Representative from New York.

Born in Macedon, New York, Richardson attended the common school and the local academy at Macedon. He was graduated from Yale College in 1856. He studied law in Rochester, New York. He was admitted to the bar in 1859, and practiced.

Richardson entered the Union Army in 1861, and served over three years, achieving the rank of First Lieutenant in the 6th Regiment New York Volunteer Cavalry ("2nd Ira Harris Guard"). He served the last two years as a staff officer to the Cavalry Corps commander, and took part in most of the battles of the Army of the Potomac under Generals George Stoneman, Alfred Pleasonton, and David McMurtrie Gregg.

Richardson moved to Angelica, New York, in 1866. He was elected as a Republican to the Forty-sixth and Forty-seventh Congresses (March 4, 1879 – March 3, 1883). He was not a candidate for reelection in 1882.

He resumed the practice of law in Angelica, New York, where he died on June 21, 1904. He was interred in Angelica Cemetery.

Richardson's son was lawyer Ransom L. Richardson.

U.S. House of Representatives
Preceded by John N. Hungerford	Member of the U.S. House of Representatives from New York's 29th congressional district 1879–1883	Succeeded by John Arnot, Jr.
