= Stephen C. Millard =

American politician (1841–1914)

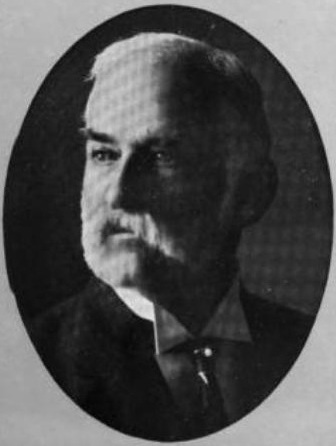

Member of the U.S. House of Representatives from New York
- In office March 4, 1883 – March 3, 1887
- Preceded by: Jeremiah W. Dwight (28th); Sereno E. Payne (26th)
- Succeeded by: John Arnot Jr. (28th); Milton De Lano (26th)
- Constituency: 28th district (1883-85); 26th district (1885-87)

Personal details
- Born: Stephen Columbus Millard; January 14, 1841 Stamford, Vermont, U.S.
- Died: June 21, 1914 (aged 73) Binghamton, New York, U.S.
- Resting place: Spring Forest Cemetery
- Party: Republican
- Education: Williams College
- Profession: Politician, lawyer

Stephen Columbus Millard (January 14, 1841 – June 21, 1914) was a U.S. representative from New York.

Born in Stamford, Vermont, Millard attended Powers Institute and graduated from Williams College in 1865. He attended Harvard Law School. He was admitted to the bar of the State of New York in May 1867 and commenced practice in Binghamton. He served as chairman of the Republican county committee from 1872 to 1879.

Millard was elected as a Republican to the Forty-eighth and Forty-ninth Congresses (March 4, 1883 – March 3, 1887). He was not a candidate for renomination in 1886. He resumed the practice of law in Binghamton, New York, where he died June 21, 1914, being interred in Spring Forest Cemetery.

== Sources ==
- United States Congress. "Stephen C. Millard (id: M000711)". Biographical Directory of the United States Congress.

U.S. House of Representatives
Preceded by Jeremiah W. Dwight	Member of the U.S. House of Representatives from New York's 28th congressional district 1883–1885	Succeeded by John Arnot Jr.
Preceded by Sereno E. Payne	Member of the U.S. House of Representatives from New York's 26th congressional district 1885–1887	Succeeded by Milton De Lano
