= Jesse S. Phillips =

American politician (1871–1954)

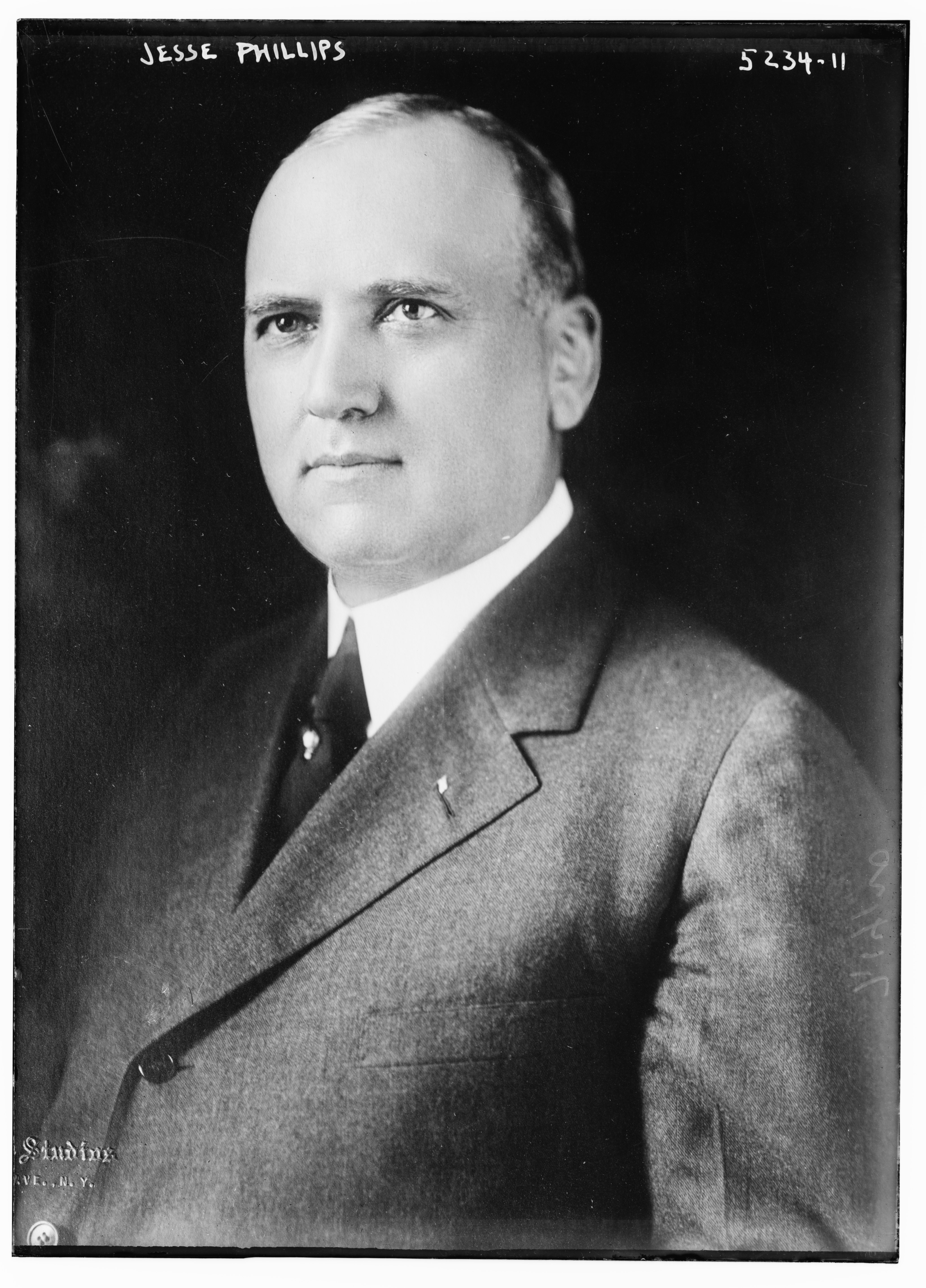
Jesse Phillips

Jesse Snyder Phillips (May 4, 1871 – November 6, 1954) was an American lawyer, politician, and insurance executive from New York.

== Life ==
Phillips was born on May 4, 1871, in Independence, New York, the son of Peter Phillips and Elizabeth Snyder. His parents were German immigrants from Darmstadt, Hesse.

Phillips grew up on a farm. He moved to Andover with his parents when he was 15. He graduated from the Andover Union School in 1891. He read law with Levi C. Van Fleet, and then graduated from the University of Michigan with an LL.B. in 1893. He was admitted to the New York bar a year later and began practicing law with Van Fleet. From 1899 to 1912, he had his own practice in Andover.

Phillips served as the village attorney. In 1898, he was elected town supervisor, one of the youngest people to serve that position in the county at the time. He was re-elected in 1899 for a two-year term. In 1900, he was elected to the New York State Assembly as a Republican, representing Allegany County. He served in the Assembly in 1901, 1902, 1903, 1904, 1905, 1906, 1907, 1908, 1909, 1910, and 1911.

While in the Assembly, Phillips was a member of the Special Joint Educational Committee of the Senate and Assembly in 1903, which recommended the state's educational system be unified. He was also Vice-Chairman of the Special Joint Legislative Committee formed in 1909 to investigate the direct primary system. In 1912, after declining another term in the Assembly, he moved to Hornell and practiced law there. He formed a law partnership with Fred A. Robbins and Shirley E. Brown. Two years later, after Robbins moved to Rochester, Phillips became head of the law firm Phillips, Brown, & Greene. He was a delegate to the 1915 New York State Constitutional Convention, where he was Chairman of the Committee on Library and Information. In 1915, Governor Whitman appointed him Superintendent of the New York State Insurance Department.

Phillips served two terms as Superintendent of Insurance and was reappointed for a third term by Governor Nathan Miller. In 1917, he was elected president of the National Convention of Insurance Commissioners. In 1921, he resigned as Superintendent to become general manager and counsel of the National Bureau of Casualty and Surety Underwriters, an organization which consisted of thirty leading stock companies in the United States. In 1922, he moved to Bronxville. In 1926, he was elected president of the Great American Indemnity Company. In 1933, he was made chairman of that company's board of directors. He also served vice-president and director of the Great American Insurance Company, the American Alliance Insurance Company, the Rochester-American Insurance Company, and the several affiliates of the Great American group. He became a member of the State Insurance Board in 1933. He was a member of the Insurance Institute of America and a fellow of the Casualty Actuarial Society.

Phillips was a director and vice-president of the First National Bank of Hornell for several years, ending his ties with the bank in 1933. He was also president of the Burrows National Bank of Andover for several years and served as a director of the bank from its organization to its merger with the Andover National Bank in 1934. He also served as a director of the latter bank.

Phillips was a member of the Freemasons, the Elks, and the New York State Bar Association. He was initially a Presbyterian, but he later joined the Reformed Church of Bronxville. He was also a member of the American Bar Association, the Chamber of Commerce of the State of New York, the Downtown Athletic Club, and the Westchester Country Club. In 1902, he married Mary T. Cannon of Andover. Their children were Francis William and Mary Elizabeth. Mary Cannon died in 1939, and in 1944 Phillips married Emily M. Rosebery of Boonton, New Jersey.

Phillips died at home on November 6, 1954. He was buried in Kensico Cemetery.

New York State Assembly
Preceded by Almanzo W. Litchard	New York State Assembly; Allegany County; 1901–1911	Succeeded by Ransom L. Richardson
