= Henry S. Walbridge =

American politician

Henry Sanford Walbridge
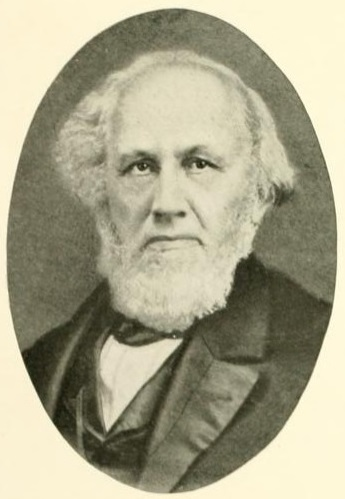

Member of the U.S. House of Representatives from New York's 26th district
- In office March 4, 1851 – March 3, 1853
- Preceded by: William T. Jackson
- Succeeded by: Andrew Oliver

Personal details
- Born: April 8, 1801 Norwich, Connecticut, U.S.
- Died: January 27, 1869 (aged 67)

Henry Sanford Walbridge (April 8, 1801 – January 27, 1869) was a U.S. representative from New York and a cousin of Hiram Walbridge.

Born in Norwich, Connecticut, Walbridge attended school in Bennington, Vermont. He moved to Ithaca, New York, in 1820. He studied law, was admitted to the bar and commenced practice in Ithaca. He served as clerk of the board of supervisors of Tompkins County in 1824. He served as president of the village council of Ithaca, Tompkins County, in 1829 and again in 1842. He was a member of the State assembly in 1846.

Walbridge was elected as a Whig to the Thirty-second Congress (March 4, 1851 – March 3, 1853). He declined to be a candidate for renomination in 1852.

He was Trustee of Ithaca Academy 1858–1868. He served as judge and surrogate of Tompkins County in 1859–1868. He moved to Leonia, New Jersey, in 1868 and practiced law in New York City.

Walbridge was killed in a railroad accident at the Bergen Tunnel near Hoboken, New Jersey, on January 27, 1869. He was interred in Ithaca City Cemetery, Ithaca, New York.

Walbridge married three times; his daughter Alice Walbridge Gulick was a Christian missionary in Spain, Cuba, Philadelphia, and Hawaii.

U.S. House of Representatives
Preceded by William T. Jackson	Member of the U.S. House of Representatives from New York's 26th congressional district 1851–1853	Succeeded by Andrew Oliver
