= Milton De Lano =

American politician (1844–1922)

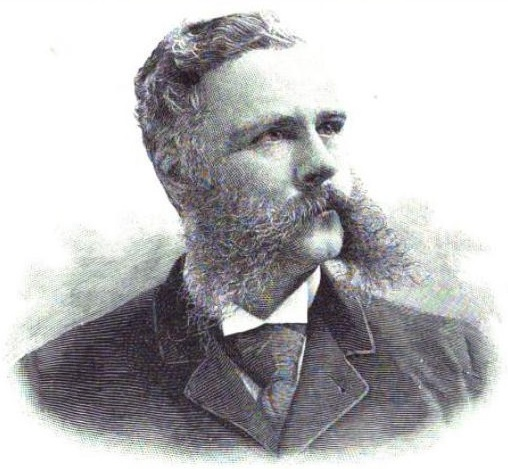

Chair of the U.S. House Committee on Pensions
- In office 1889–1891

Member of the U.S. House of Representatives from New York's 26th district
- In office March 4, 1887 – March 3, 1891
- Preceded by: Stephen C. Millard
- Succeeded by: George W. Ray

Sheriff of Madison County
- In office 1879–1881
- In office 1873–1875

Personal details
- Born: August 11, 1844 Wampsville, New York, U.S.
- Died: January 2, 1922 (aged 77) Syracuse, New York, U.S.
- Party: Republican

Milton De Lano (August 11, 1844 – January 2, 1922) was an American businessman and United States representative from New York. Born in Wampsville, he attended the common schools and settled in Canastota, New York, where he engaged in mercantile pursuits for eight years. He was town clerk of Lenox from 1867 to 1869 and sheriff of Madison County from 1873 to 1875 and 1879 to 1881. He engaged in banking, the real-estate business, and in the manufacture of window glass. De Lano was a member of the Canastota Board of Education from 1883 to 1905 and served as president from 1893 to 1905; aided in the organization of the Canastota Northern Railroad Company, and was a delegate to the Republican National Convention in 1884.

De Lano was elected as a Republican to the Fiftieth and Fifty-first Congresses, holding office from March 4, 1887 to March 3, 1891. While in the House he was chairman, of the Committee on Pensions (Fifty-first Congress). He declined to be a candidate for renomination in 1890 and resumed banking; he was receiver of the Hudson River Power Co. from 1908 to 1912 and became president of the State Bank of Canastota in 1912. He died in Syracuse; interment was in Mount Pleasant Cemetery, Canastota.

U.S. House of Representatives
Preceded by Stephen C. Millard	Member of the U.S. House of Representatives from New York's 26th congressional district 1887–1891	Succeeded by George W. Ray
