= William Terry Jackson =

American politician

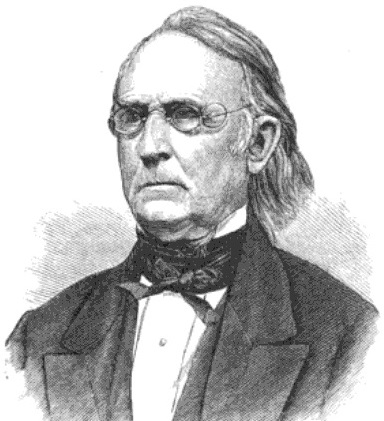
- In office March 4, 1849 – March 4, 1851
- Preceded by: William T. Lawrence
- Succeeded by: Henry S. Walbridge

Personal details
- Born: December 29, 1794 Chester, New York
- Died: September 15, 1882 (aged 87) Montour Falls, New York

William Terry Jackson (December 29, 1794 – September 15, 1882) was a U.S. representative from New York.

Born in Chester, New York, Jackson attended the common schools and later studied surveying. He taught school in Goshen, New York from 1813–15. He was employed as a surveyor and later engaged in mercantile pursuits in Chester and Owego, and Bermerville, Sussex County, New Jersey. He moved to Havana, Chemung County (now Montour, Schuyler County, New York) in 1825 and engaged in mercantile pursuits.

He was a Justice of the Peace 1836–1838. He served as judge of the court of common pleas and general sessions of Chemung County 1839–1846. He was again a Justice of the Peace, town of Catharine, New York, originally in Chemung County, but later incorporated into Schuyler County.

Jackson was elected as a Whig to the Thirty-first Congress (March 4, 1849 – March 4, 1851). He resumed mercantile pursuits. He died in Montour Falls, New York on September 15, 1882, aged 87 and was interred in Montour Falls Cemetery.

== Sources ==
- United States Congress. "William Terry Jackson (id: J000031)". Biographical Directory of the United States Congress.

U.S. House of Representatives
Preceded by William T. Lawrence	Member of the U.S. House of Representatives from New York's 26th congressional district 1849–1851	Succeeded by Henry S. Walbridge
