= Charles C. B. Walker =

American politician

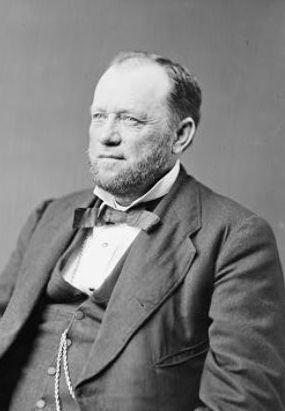

Member of the U.S. House of Representatives from New York's 29th district
- In office March 4, 1875 – March 3, 1877
- Preceded by: Freeman Clarke
- Succeeded by: John N. Hungerford

Personal details
- Born: June 27, 1824 Drewsville, New Hampshire, U.S.
- Died: January 26, 1888 (aged 63) Corning, New York, U.S.
- Resting place: Palmyra Cemetery, New York, U.S.
- Party: Democratic

Charles Christopher Brainerd Walker (June 27, 1824 – January 26, 1888) was a U.S. representative from New York.

Born in Drewsville, New Hampshire, near Bellows Falls, Vermont, Walker completed preparatory studies. He moved to Corning, New York, in 1848. He was Postmaster of Corning 1856–1860, as well as a contractor engaging in the hardware and lumber business. During the Civil War, he served as brigade quartermaster with the rank of captain in the New York State Militia. He served as delegate to the Democratic National Conventions at Charleston in 1860 and at Baltimore in 1872.

Walker was elected as a Democrat to the Forty-fourth Congress, March 4, 1875, to March 3, 1877.

Subsequently, he resumed his former business activities. He served as member of the board of control of the New York Agricultural Experiment Station from June 10, 1885, until his death. In addition, he was Chairman of the New York State Democratic Committee from 1887 until his death.

Walker died in Corning, New York on January 26, 1888. He was interred in Palmyra Cemetery, Palmyra, New York.

State Senator Charles E. Walker (1860–1893) was his son.

== Sources ==
- United States Congress. "Charles C. B. Walker (id: W000047)". Biographical Directory of the United States Congress.

U.S. House of Representatives
Preceded by Freeman Clarke	Member of the U.S. House of Representatives from New York's 29th congressional district 1875–1877	Succeeded by John N. Hungerford
Party political offices
Preceded by John C. O'Brien	New York State Democratic Committee Chairman; 1887–1888	Succeeded by Edward Murphy Jr.
