= John Arnot Jr. =

American politician (1831–1886)

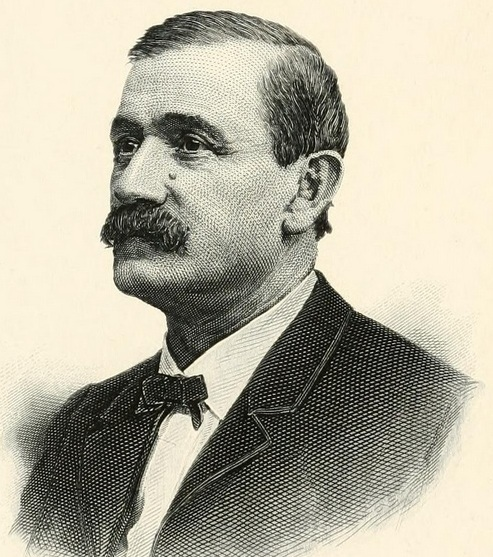

Member of the U.S. House of Representatives from New York
- In office March 4, 1883 – November 20, 1886
- Preceded by: David P. Richardson
- Succeeded by: Thomas S. Flood
- Constituency: 29th district (1883–85); 28th district (1885–86)

Mayor of Elmira, New York
- In office 1874–1875
- Preceded by: Luther Caldwell
- Succeeded by: Howard M. Smith
- In office 1870–1871
- Preceded by: Stephen McDonald
- Succeeded by: Patrick H. Flood
- In office 1864–1865
- Preceded by: None (position created)
- Succeeded by: John I. Nicks

Personal details
- Born: March 11, 1831 Elmira, New York, U.S.
- Died: November 20, 1886 (aged 55) Elmira, New York, U.S.
- Resting place: Woodlawn Cemetery, Elmira, New York, U.S.
- Party: Democratic
- Spouse: Ann Elizabeth Hulett (m. 1858)
- Children: 3
- Education: Yale College (attended)
- Profession: Banker

John Arnot Jr. (March 11, 1831 – November 20, 1886) was an American Civil War veteran, banker and politician who served as a U.S. representative from New York from 1883 until his death in 1886.

== Early life ==
John Arnot Jr. was born in Elmira, New York on March 11, 1831, a son of John Arnot and Harriet (Tuttle) Arnot. He was raised and educated at private schools in Elmira, and attended Yale College, but left before graduating to begin a banking career in New York City. In 1852, he returned to Elmira to succeed his father as cashier of the Chemung Canal Bank following his father's promotion to bank president.

== Career ==
Arnot was affiliated with the Chemung National Bank for the rest of his life. In addition, his other ventures included ownership of the T. Briggs and Company brewery, a major investor in the Elmira Gas Company, and treasurer of the Clearfield Bituminous Coal Company. Arnot was also a successful real estate investor, and had holdings throughout Elmira. Active in politics as a Democrat, he served on the Elmira board of education, and was president of the village of Elmira from 1859 to 1864. In 1858, he married Ann Elizabeth Hulett, with whom he was the father of three children.

When Elmira was chartered as a city in 1864, Arnot was elected its first mayor, and he was elected again in 1870 and 1874. In 1882, he initially declined the Democratic nomination for a seat in the United States House of Representatives, but he subsequently agreed to run.

=== Congress ===
Arnot was elected to the 48th Congress from New York's 29th district, and to the 49th Congress from the New York's 28th district. He served from March 4, 1883, until his death.

== Death and legacy ==
In October 1884, gasses that had built up in the vault of the Chemung Canal Bank exploded when Arnot opened the vault. He was severely injured, but was later able to return to work. His health declined after the explosion, and he died in Elmira on November 20, 1886. He was buried at Woodlawn Cemetery in Elmira.

Arnot was a communicant of Elmira's Trinity Church. A memorial chapel on the church campus was built to honor Arnot and his family, and was financed by Arnot's sister, Mariana Tuttle Arnot Ogden, and her husband William Butler Ogden.

== See also ==
- List of members of the United States Congress who died in office (1790–1899)

U.S. House of Representatives
Preceded by David P. Richardson	Member of the U.S. House of Representatives from New York's 29th congressional district March 4, 1883 - March 3, 1885	Succeeded by Ira Davenport
Preceded by Stephen C. Millard	Member of the U.S. House of Representatives from New York's 28th congressional district March 4, 1885 - November 20, 1886 (death)	Succeeded by Thomas S. Flood
