= Hiram Walbridge =

US Congressman from New York

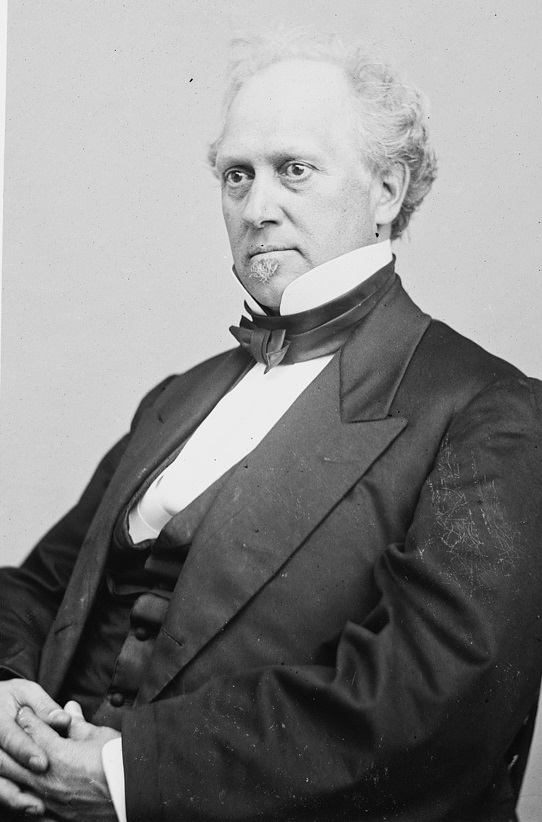
- Brady-Handy Photograph, circa 1855

Member of the U.S. House of Representatives from New York's 3rd district
- In office March 4, 1853 – March 3, 1855
- Preceded by: Emanuel B. Hart
- Succeeded by: Guy R. Pelton

Personal details
- Born: February 2, 1821 Ithaca, New York, US
- Died: December 6, 1870 (aged 49) New York City, US
- Resting place: Glenwood Cemetery (Washington, D.C.)
- Party: Democratic
- Profession: Attorney; Merchant

Hiram Walbridge (February 2, 1821 – December 6, 1870) was an American businessman, lawyer, and politician who served one term as a U.S. Representative from New York from 1853 to 1855. He was a cousin of Henry Sanford Walbridge.

== Life and career ==
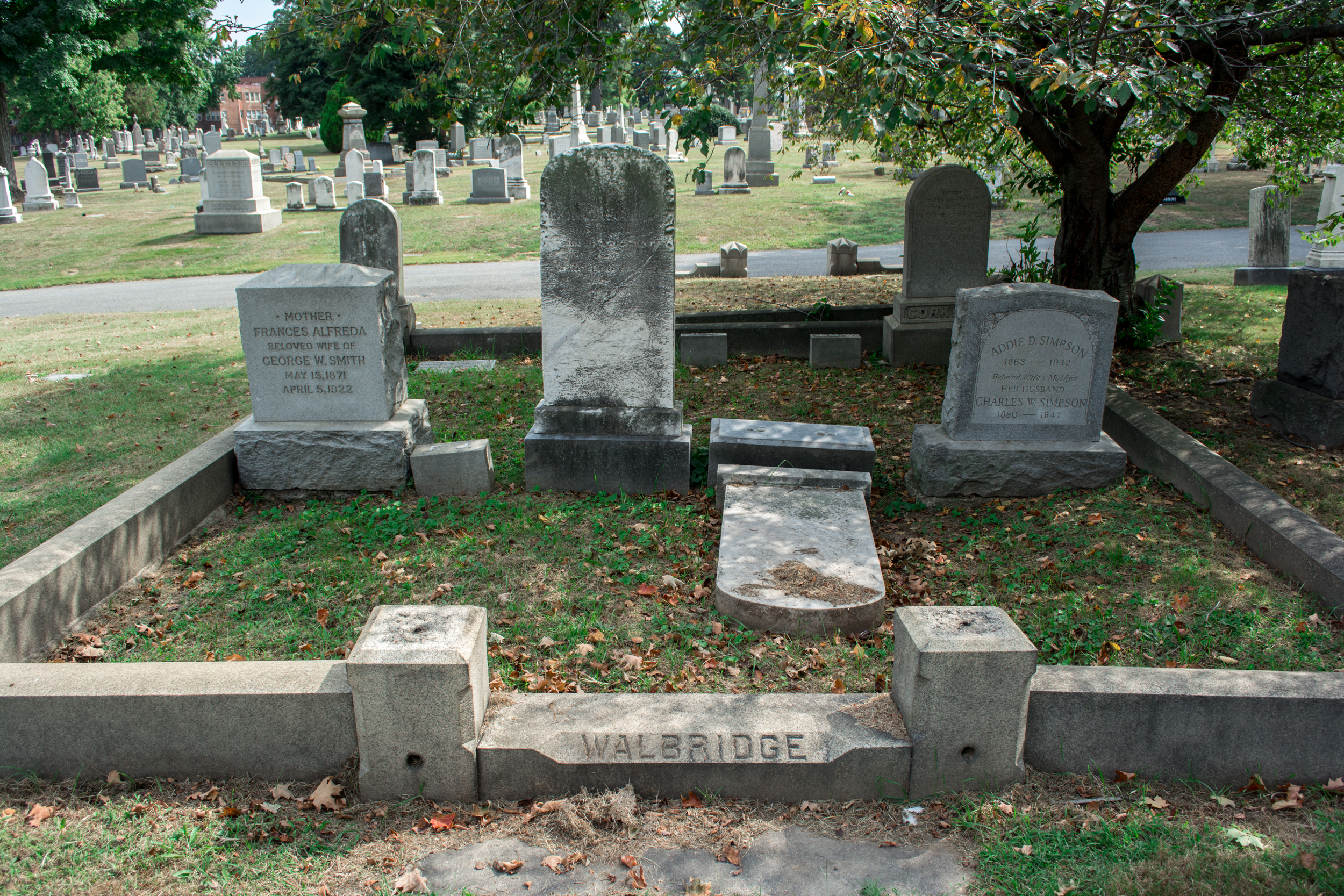
Grave of Hiram Walbridge.

Walbridge was born in Ithaca, New York on February 2, 1821, a son of Chester and Mary Walbridge. He was educated in Ithaca and Utica, and privately tutored by an uncle. He moved to Ohio with his parents, who settled in Toledo in 1836. He attended Ohio University in Athens from 1839 to 1840, but was expelled for violating the school's rule against partisan political activities after he campaigned for William Henry Harrison in the 1840 United States presidential election.

=== Early career ===
Walbridge studied law with Judge Myron H. Tilden of Toledo, was admitted to the bar in 1842 and commenced practice in Toledo.

He was also an active member of the state militia, and was commissioned a brigadier general in 1843. He served as a member of Toledo's board of aldermen from 1843 to 1846. He later moved to Buffalo, New York, where he engaged in the mercantile business. He moved to New York City in 1847, where he continued his mercantile career.

=== Congress ===
Walbridge was elected as a Democrat to the Thirty-third Congress (March 4, 1853 – March 3, 1855). He declined to be a candidate for renomination in 1854. He supported the Union during the American Civil War and in 1862 was an unsuccessful Union candidate for election to the Thirty-eighth Congress.

=== Later career ===
He served as president of the International Commercial Convention held in Detroit, Michigan, July 11, 1865. Walbridge was elected as a delegate to the 1866 National Union Convention in Philadelphia.

== Death and burial ==
He died in New York City December 6, 1870. He was interred in Glenwood Cemetery in Washington, D.C.

== Bibliography ==
- Bailey, N. Louise; Morgan, Mary L.; Taylor, Carolyn R. (1986). Biographical Directory of the South Carolina Senate: 1776-1985. Volume 1. Columbia, S.C.: University of South Carolina Press. ISBN 0872494799.

U.S. House of Representatives
Preceded by Emanuel B. Hart	Member of the U.S. House of Representatives from New York's 3rd congressional district 1853–1855	Succeeded by Guy R. Pelton
