= Andrew Z. McCarty =

American politician (1808–1879)

Member of the U.S. House of Representatives from New York's 22nd district
- In office March 4, 1855 – March 3, 1857
- Preceded by: Henry C. Goodwin
- Succeeded by: Henry C. Goodwin

Member of the New York State Assembly from the Oswego County 2nd district
- In office January 1, 1848 – December 31, 1848
- Preceded by: Numbered district created
- Succeeded by: Edward W. Fox

Personal details
- Born: Andrew Zimmerman McCarty; July 14, 1808 Rhinebeck, New York, U.S.
- Died: April 23, 1879 (aged 70) Pulaski, New York, U.S.
- Resting place: Pulaski Cemetery, Pulaski, New York, U.S.
- Party: Whig
- Occupation: Politician, lawyer

Andrew Zimmerman McCarty (July 14, 1808 – April 23, 1879) was an American politician. He served as a U.S. Representative from New York.

== Early life and education ==
Born in Rhinebeck, New York, McCarty studied law.

== Career ==
He was admitted to the bar in 1831 and commenced practice in Pulaski, New York. He served as county clerk of Oswego County from 1840 to 1843. He was a member of the New York State Assembly (Oswego Co., 2nd D.) during the 71st New York State Legislature in 1848.

McCarty was elected as a Whig candidate to the Thirty-fourth Congress (March 4, 1855 – March 3, 1857).

He resumed the practice of his profession in Pulaski, where he served as Register of bankruptcy (1875–1879).

== Death ==
He died in Pulaski on April 23, 1879. He was interred in Pulaski Cemetery.

== Sources ==
- United States Congress. "Andrew Z. McCarty (id: M000319)". Biographical Directory of the United States Congress.

New York State Assembly
Preceded by numbered district created	New York State Assembly; Oswego County, 2nd District; 1848	Succeeded by Edward W. Fox
U.S. House of Representatives
Preceded by Henry C. Goodwin	Member of the U.S. House of Representatives from New York's 22nd congressional district 1855–1857	Succeeded by Henry C. Goodwin
