= New York's 29th congressional district =

Former congressional district

- Obsolete district
- Created: 1820
- Eliminated: 2010
- Years active: 1823–2013

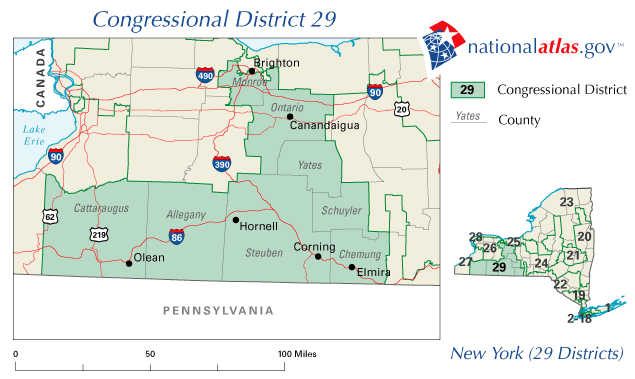
The district from 2003 to 2013

New York's 29th congressional district is an obsolete congressional district for the United States House of Representatives which most recently included a portion of the Appalachian mountains in New York known as the "Southern Tier." It was most recently represented by Republican Tom Reed. This district number became obsolete for the 113th Congress in 2013 as a result of the 2010 census. Most of the former 29th district remained intact and was to be renumbered as the 23rd district.

== Voting ==
Election results from presidential races
| Year | Office | Results |
|---|---|---|
| 1992 | President | Clinton 40–33% |
| 1996 | President | Clinton 51–35% |
| 2000 | President | Bush 53–43% |
| 2004 | President | Bush 56–42% |
| 2008 | President | McCain 51–48% |

== Components ==
The 29th district was centered in Buffalo and Niagara Falls in the 1990s (represented by John LaFalce); that district was dismantled and parceled out to the present 27th and 28th Districts. In the 1980s this district was centered in suburban Rochester. During the 1970s the district was congruent to the present upper Hudson Valley 20th District.

The far southern tier district was numbered the 31st District in the 1990s and the 34th District in the 1980s, when Amo Houghton represented it. During the 1970s this area was primarily in the 39th District. Prior versions of this district included Chautauqua county; suburban Rochester had never been in a southern tier district until the 2002 remap. The result was that the district changed from a "packed" Republican district to a "cracked" district. The 2008 elections reversed the crack, meaning that the heavily Democratic and suburban Monroe County votes were able to swing the district in their favor, leaving most of the rest of the expansive district out of influence, though not without help from an unexplained vote shift in Cattaraugus County. Former Corning Mayor Tom Reed, a Republican, was sworn in on Nov. 18, 2010 to fill out the term of Democrat Eric Massa, who resigned. Reed was elected to a full two-year term in the 112th Congress.

1913–1945:

All of Saratoga, Warren, Washington
Parts of Rensselaer

1945–1953:

All of Delaware, Orange, Rockland, Sullivan

1953–1963:

All of Columbia, Dutchess, Greene, Schoharie, Ulster

1963–1969:

All of Albany, Schenectady
Parts of Rensselaer

1969–1971:

All of Albany, Schenectady

1971–1973:

All of Schenectady
Parts of Albany, Montgomery

1973–1983:

All of Greene, Rensselaer, Saratoga, Warren, Washington
Parts of Albany, Columbia, Essex

1983–1993:

All of Cayuga, Oswego, Seneca, Wayne
Parts of Monroe, Oneida

1993–2003:

All of Niagara, Orleans
Parts of Erie, Monroe

2003–2013:

All of Allegany, Cattaraugus, Chemung, Schuyler, Steuben, Yates
Parts of Monroe, Ontario

== List of members representing the district ==
| Member | Party | Years | Cong ress | Electoral history |
|---|---|---|---|---|
District established March 4, 1823
| Isaac Wilson (Middlebury) | Democratic-Republican | March 4, 1823 – January 7, 1824 | 18th | Lost election contest |
| Parmenio Adams (Batavia) | Adams-Clay; Republican | January 7, 1824 – March 3, 1825 | 18th 19th | Won election contest Re-elected in 1824. [data missing] |
| Parmenio Adams (Batavia) | Anti-Jacksonian | March 4, 1825 – March 3, 1827 | 18th 19th | Won election contest Re-elected in 1824. [data missing] |
| David Ellicott Evans (Batavia) | Jacksonian | March 4, 1827 – May 2, 1827 | 20th | Elected in 1826. Resigned. |
| Vacant | | May 3, 1827 – December 3, 1827 | 20th | |
| Phineas L. Tracy (Batavia) | Anti-Jacksonian | December 3, 1827 – March 3, 1829 | 20th 21st 22nd | Elected to finish Evans's term. Re-elected in 1828. Re-elected in 1830. [data missing] |
| Phineas L. Tracy (Batavia) | Anti-Masonic | March 4, 1829 – March 3, 1833 | 20th 21st 22nd | Elected to finish Evans's term. Re-elected in 1828. Re-elected in 1830. [data missing] |
| George W. Lay (Batavia) | Anti-Masonic | March 4, 1833 – March 3, 1835 | 23rd 24th | Elected in 1832. Re-elected in 1834. [data missing] |
| George W. Lay (Batavia) | Anti-Jacksonian | March 4, 1835 – March 3, 1837 | 23rd 24th | Elected in 1832. Re-elected in 1834. [data missing] |
| William Patterson (Warsaw) | Whig | March 4, 1837 – August 14, 1838 | 25th | Elected in 1836. Died. |
| Vacant | | August 14, 1838 – November 6, 1838 | 25th | |
| Harvey Putnam (Attica) | Whig | November 7, 1838 – March 3, 1839 | 25th | Elected to finish Patterson's term. [data missing] |
| Seth M. Gates (Le Roy) | Whig | March 4, 1839 – March 3, 1843 | 26th 27th | Elected in 1838. Re-elected in 1840. [data missing] |
| Charles H. Carroll (Groveland) | Whig | March 4, 1843 – March 3, 1847 | 28th 29th | Elected in 1842. Re-elected in 1844. [data missing] |
| Robert L. Rose (Allens Hill) | Whig | March 4, 1847 – March 3, 1851 | 30th 31st | Elected in 1846. Re-elected in 1848. [data missing] |
| Jerediah Horsford (Moscow) | Whig | March 4, 1851 – March 3, 1853 | 32nd | Elected in 1850. [data missing] |
| Azariah Boody (Rochester) | Whig | March 4, 1853 – October, 1853 | 33rd | Elected in 1852. Resigned. |
| Vacant | | October 1853 – November 7, 1853 | 33rd | |
| Davis Carpenter (Brockport) | Whig | November 8, 1853 – March 3, 1855 | 33rd | Elected to finish Boody's term. [data missing] |
| John Williams (Rochester) | Democratic | March 4, 1855 – March 3, 1857 | 34th | Elected in 1854. [data missing] |
| Samuel G. Andrews (Rochester) | Republican | March 4, 1857 – March 3, 1859 | 35th | Elected in 1856. [data missing] |
| Alfred Ely (Rochester) | Republican | March 4, 1859 – March 3, 1863 | 36th 37th | Elected in 1858. Re-elected in 1860. [data missing] |
| Augustus Frank (Warsaw) | Republican | March 4, 1863 – March 3, 1865 | 38th | Redistricted from the 30th district and re-elected in 1862. [data missing] |
| Burt Van Horn (Lockport) | Republican | March 4, 1865 – March 3, 1869 | 39th 40th | Elected in 1864. Re-elected in 1866. [data missing] |
| John Fisher (Batavia) | Republican | March 4, 1869 – March 3, 1871 | 41st | Elected in 1868. [data missing] |
| Seth Wakeman (Batavia) | Republican | March 4, 1871 – March 3, 1873 | 42nd | Elected in 1870. [data missing] |
| Freeman Clarke (Rochester) | Republican | March 4, 1873 – March 3, 1875 | 43rd | Redistricted from the 28th district and re-elected in 1872. [data missing] |
| Charles C.B. Walker (Corning) | Democratic | March 4, 1875 – March 3, 1877 | 44th | Elected in 1874. [data missing] |
| John N. Hungerford (Corning) | Republican | March 4, 1877 – March 3, 1879 | 45th | Elected in 1876. [data missing] |
| David P. Richardson (Angelica) | Republican | March 4, 1879 – March 3, 1883 | 46th 47th | Elected in 1878. Re-elected in 1880. [data missing] |
| John Arnot Jr. (Elmira) | Democratic | March 4, 1883 – March 3, 1885 | 48th | Elected in 1882. Redistricted to the 28th district. |
| Ira Davenport (Bath) | Republican | March 4, 1885 – March 3, 1889 | 49th 50th | Elected in 1884. Re-elected in 1886. [data missing] |
| John Raines (Canandaigua) | Republican | March 4, 1889 – March 3, 1893 | 51st 52nd | Elected in 1888. Re-elected in 1890. [data missing] |
| Charles W. Gillet (Addison) | Republican | March 4, 1893 – March 3, 1903 | 53rd 54th 55th 56th 57th | Elected in 1892. Re-elected in 1894. Re-elected in 1896. Re-elected in 1898. Re-elected in 1900. Redistricted to the 33rd district. |
| Michael E. Driscoll (Syracuse) | Republican | March 4, 1903 – March 3, 1913 | 58th 59th 60th 61st 62nd | Redistricted from the 27th district and re-elected in 1902. Re-elected in 1904. Re-elected in 1906. Re-elected in 1908. Re-elected in 1910. [data missing] |
| James S. Parker (Salem) | Republican | March 4, 1913 – December 19, 1933 | 63rd 64th 65th 66th 67th 68th 69th 70th 71st 72nd 73rd | Elected in 1912. Re-elected in 1914. Re-elected in 1916. Re-elected in 1918. Re-elected in 1920. Re-elected in 1922. Re-elected in 1924. Re-elected in 1926. Re-elected in 1928. Re-elected in 1930. Re-elected in 1932. Died. |
| Vacant | | December 19, 1933 – January 29, 1934 | 73rd | |
| William D. Thomas (Hoosick Falls) | Republican | January 30, 1934 – May 17, 1936 | 73rd 74th | Elected to finish Parker's term. Re-elected in 1934. Died. |
| Vacant | | May 18, 1936 – January 3, 1937 | 74th | |
| E. Harold Cluett (Troy) | Republican | January 3, 1937 – January 3, 1943 | 75th 76th 77th | Elected in 1936. Re-elected in 1938. Re-elected in 1940. [data missing] |
| Dean P. Taylor (Troy) | Republican | January 3, 1943 – January 3, 1945 | 78th | Elected in 1942. Redistricted to the 33rd district. |
| Augustus W. Bennet (Newburgh) | Republican | January 3, 1945 – January 3, 1947 | 79th | Elected in 1944. [data missing] |
| Katharine St. George (Tuxedo Park) | Republican | January 3, 1947 – January 3, 1953 | 80th 81st 82nd | Elected in 1946. Re-elected in 1948. Re-elected in 1950. Redistricted to the 28th district. |
| J. Ernest Wharton (Richmondville) | Republican | January 3, 1953 – January 3, 1963 | 83rd 84th 85th 86th 87th | Redistricted from the 30th district and re-elected in 1952. Re-elected in 1954. Re-elected in 1956. Re-elected in 1958. Re-elected in 1960. Redistricted to the 28th district. |
| Leo W. O'Brien (Albany) | Democratic | January 3, 1963 – December 30, 1966 | 88th 89th | Redistricted from the 30th district and re-elected in 1962. Re-elected in 1964. Resigned. |
| Vacant | | December 31, 1966 – January 2, 1967 | 89th | |
| Daniel E. Button (Albany) | Republican | January 3, 1967 – January 3, 1971 | 90th 91st | Elected in 1966. Re-elected in 1968. [data missing] |
| Samuel S. Stratton (Amsterdam) | Democratic | January 3, 1971 – January 3, 1973 | 92nd | Redistricted from the 35th district and re-elected in 1970. Redistricted to the 28th district. |
| Carleton J. King (Saratoga Springs) | Republican | January 3, 1973 – December 31, 1974 | 93rd | Redistricted from the 30th district and re-elected in 1972. Resigned. |
| Vacant | | January 1, 1975 – January 2, 1975 | 93rd | |
| Edward W. Pattison (West Sand Lake) | Democratic | January 3, 1975 – January 3, 1979 | 94th 95th | Elected in 1974. Re-elected in 1976. [data missing] |
| Gerald Solomon (Glens Falls) | Republican | January 3, 1979 – January 3, 1983 | 96th 97th | Elected in 1978. Re-elected in 1980. Redistricted to the 24th district. |
| Frank Horton (Rochester) | Republican | January 3, 1983 – January 3, 1993 | 98th 99th 100th 101st 102nd | Redistricted from the 34th district and re-elected in 1982. Re-elected in 1984. Re-elected in 1986. Re-elected in 1988. Re-elected in 1990. [data missing] |
| John LaFalce (Tonawanda) | Democratic | January 3, 1993 – January 3, 2003 | 103rd 104th 105th 106th 107th | Redistricted from the 32nd district and re-elected in 1992. Re-elected in 1994. Re-elected in 1996. Re-elected in 1998. Re-elected in 2000. [data missing] |
| Amo Houghton (Corning) | Republican | January 3, 2003 – January 3, 2005 | 108th | Redistricted from the 31st district and re-elected in 2002. Retired. |
| Randy Kuhl (Hammondsport) | Republican | January 3, 2005 – January 3, 2009 | 109th 110th | Elected in 2004. Re-elected in 2006. Lost re-election. |
| Eric Massa (Corning) | Democratic | January 3, 2009 – March 8, 2010 | 111th | Elected in 2008. Resigned. |
| Vacant | | March 8, 2010 – November 18, 2010 | 111th | |
| Tom Reed (Corning) | Republican | November 18, 2010 – January 3, 2013 | 111th 112th | Elected to finish Massa's term. Elected to full term in 2010. Redistricted to the 23rd district. |
District dissolved January 3, 2013

== Recent election results ==
Following are the results of the elections of 1996 through 2008.

In New York State electoral politics there are numerous minor parties at various points on the political spectrum. Certain parties will invariably endorse either the Republican or Democratic candidate for every office. Therefore, the state electoral results contain both the party votes, and the final candidate votes (Listed as "Recap").

US House election, 1996: New York District 29
| Party | Candidate | Votes | % | ±% |
|---|---|---|---|---|
| Democratic | John J. LaFalce (incumbent) | 132,317 | 62.0 | |
| Republican | David B. Callard | 81,135 | 38.0 | |
| Majority | | 51,182 | 24.0 | |
| Turnout | | 213,452 | 100 | |

US House election, 1998: New York District 29
| Party | Candidate | Votes | % | ±% |
|---|---|---|---|---|
| Democratic | John J. LaFalce (incumbent) | 97,235 | 57.0 | −5.0 |
| Republican | Chris Collins | 56,443 | 40.7 | +2.7 |
| Right to Life | David E. Denzel | 3,813 | 2.2 | +2.2 |
| Majority | | 27,754 | 16.3 | +7.7 |
| Turnout | | 170,529 | 100 | −20.1 |

US House election, 2000: New York District 29
| Party | Candidate | Votes | % | ±% |
|---|---|---|---|---|
| Democratic | John J. LaFalce (incumbent) | 128,328 | 61.3 | +4.3 |
| Republican | Brett M. Sommer | 81,159 | 38.7 | −2.0 |
| Majority | | 47,169 | 22.5 | +6.2 |
| Turnout | | 209,487 | 100 | +22.8 |

US House election, 2002: New York District 29
| Party | Candidate | Votes | % | ±% |
|---|---|---|---|---|
| Republican | Amo Houghton | 127,657 | 73.1 | +34.4 |
| Democratic | Kisun J. Peters | 37,128 | 21.3 | −40.0 |
| Right to Life | Wendy M. Johnson | 5,836 | 3.3 | +3.3 |
| Green | Rachel Treichler | 4,010 | 2.3 | +2.3 |
| Majority | | 90,529 | 51.8 | +29.3 |
| Turnout | | 174,631 | 100 | −16.6 |

US House election, 2004: New York District 29
| Party | Candidate | Votes | % | ±% |
|---|---|---|---|---|
| Republican | Randy Kuhl | 136,883 | 50.7 | −22.4 |
| Democratic | Samara Barend | 110,241 | 40.8 | +19.5 |
| Conservative | Mark W. Assini | 17,272 | 6.4 | +6.4 |
| Independence | John Ciampoli | 5,819 | 2.2 | +2.2 |
| Majority | | 26,642 | 9.9 | −41.9 |
| Turnout | | 270,215 | 100 | +54.7 |

US House election, 2006: New York District 29
| Party | Candidate | Votes | % | ±% |
|---|---|---|---|---|
| Republican | Randy Kuhl (incumbent) | 106,077 | 51.5 | +0.8 |
| Democratic | Eric Massa | 100,044 | 48.5 | +7.7 |
| Majority | | 6,033 | 2.9 | −7.0 |
| Turnout | | 206,121 | 100 | −23.7 |

US House election, 2008: New York District 29
| Party | Candidate | Votes | % | ±% |
|---|---|---|---|---|
| Democratic | Eric Massa | 140,529 | 51.0 | +2.5 |
| Republican | Randy Kuhl (incumbent) | 135,199 | 49.0 | −2.5 |
| Majority | | 5,330 | 1.9 | −1.0 |
| Turnout | | 275,728 | 100 | +33.8 |

== See also ==
- Tom Reed (politician)
- Eric Massa
- Amo Houghton
