= Westfield Academy =

Location
- Tolpits Lane; Watford, Hertfordshire, WD18 6NS; England
- Coordinates: 51.6471°N 0.4163°W

Information
- Type: Academy
- Department for Education URN: 140049 Tables
- Ofsted: Reports
- Chair of Governors: Dave Yuill
- Principal: Tim Body
- Gender: Coeducational
- Age: 11 to 18
- Enrolment: 1106
- Colour: Navy Blue Grey
- Website: http://www.westfield.herts.sch.uk/

Westfield Academy (formerly Westfield Community Technology College) is a coeducational secondary school and sixth form with academy status, located in the Holywell Estate in Watford, Hertfordshire, England.

Previously a community school and Technology College administered by Hertfordshire County Council, Westfield Community Technology College converted to academy status on 1 September 2013 and was renamed Westfield Academy. The school continues to coordinate with Hertfordshire County Council for admissions.

Westfield Academy also has close links with Watford Football Club. They also have links with the local primary schools, St Anthony's, Holywell and Laurence Haines. Westfield Academy is also the home ground and base of Gadeside Rangers Football Club.
