= Azariah Boody =

American politician

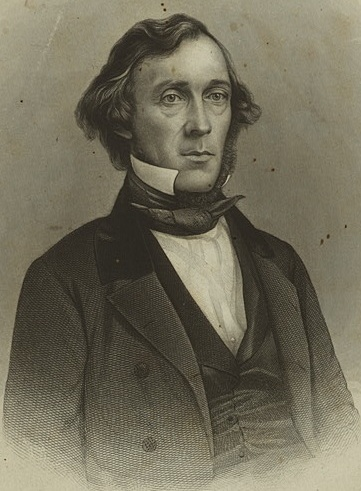
- Boody as a Member of Congress, 1853.

Member of the U.S. House of Representatives from New York's 29th district
- In office March 4, 1853 – October 13, 1853
- Preceded by: Jerediah Horsford
- Succeeded by: Davis Carpenter

Personal details
- Born: April 21, 1815 Stanstead County, Lower Canada
- Died: November 18, 1885 (aged 70) New York City, New York
- Citizenship: United States
- Party: Whig
- Spouse: Ambia Corson Boody
- Profession: Farmer; Politician; Railroad President

Azariah Boody (April 21, 1815 – November 18, 1885) was an American politician and a member of the United States House of Representatives from New York.

== Biography ==
Born in Stanstead County in Lower Canada on April 21, 1815, Boody was the son of Jonathan and Nancy Evans Boody. He moved to Massachusetts with his parents, who settled in Lowell. He attended the common schools, and moved to Rochester, New York, in 1850 where he engaged in agricultural pursuits. He was also trustee of the University of Rochester from 1853 to 1865. He married Ambia Corson.

== Career ==
Elected as a Whig to the Thirty-third United States Congress, Boody served as a United States representative for the twenty-ninth district of New York. He served from March 4 until his resignation on October 13, 1853, citing "pre-existing obligations."

Boody invested heavily in railroads, and was responsible for several New York lines (including the Genesee Valley Railroad, the Niagara Falls Railroad, and the Rochester, Lockport and Niagara Falls Railroad) being consolidated with others into the New York Central Railroad system. He also served on the board of directors of the Lake Erie, Wabash, and St. Louis Railroad Company, and was the president of the Wabash and Toledo Railroad Company until 1873.

== Death and legacy ==
Boody died of pneumonia in New York, New York County, New York, on November 18, 1885 (age 70 years, 211 days). He is interred at Mount Hope Cemetery, Rochester, New York. Boody's name is still honored by the University of Rochester community. There is or has been a "secret organization" called the Azariah Boody Society, dedicated to promoting school spirit. The popular school song "The Dandelion Yellow," written by Charles F. Cole and Richard L. Greenen in 1925, contains a verse commemorating Boody's donation of his cow pastures to the university:

O, Azariah Boody's cows were sleek and noble kine
They wandered o'er the verdant fields where grew the dandelion.
And when they drove the cows away to build a home for knowledge
They took the color from the flow'r and gave it to the college.

U.S. House of Representatives
Preceded by Jerediah Horsford	Member of the U.S. House of Representatives from New York's 29th congressional district March 4, 1853 - October 13, 1853	Succeeded by Davis Carpenter
