= Guy R. Pelton =

American politician

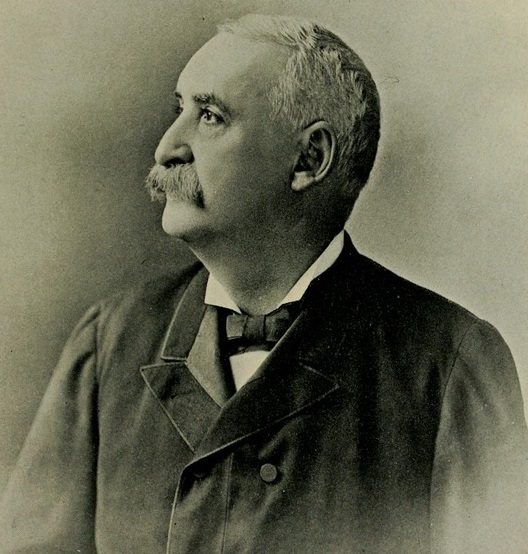
- From 1892's Genealogy of the Pelton Family in America

Member of the United States House of Representatives
- In office March 4, 1855 – March 3, 1857
- Preceded by: Hiram Walbridge
- Succeeded by: Daniel Sickles
- Constituency: New York's 3rd congressional district

Personal details
- Born: Guy Ray Pelton; August 3, 1824 Great Barrington, Massachusetts, U.S.
- Died: July 24, 1890 (aged 65) Yellowstone National Park, Wyoming, U.S.
- Resting place: Mahaiwe Cemetery, Great Barrington, Massachusetts, U.S.
- Party: Whig
- Other political affiliations: Republican (from 1856)
- Spouse(s): Mary Childs Franklin (m. 1859); Angelina Scoville (m. 1879)
- Children: 1
- Education: Oberlin College (attended)
- Profession: Attorney

Guy Ray Pelton (August 3, 1824 – July 24, 1890) was an American lawyer and politician from New York. He served as a U.S. representative to the 34th United States Congress (1855 to 1857).

== Biography ==
Pelton was born in Great Barrington, Massachusetts on August 3, 1824, the second son of Joseph Kneeland Pelton and Harriet Ray. He attended the public schools, the Sedgwick Institution in Great Barrington, and the Connecticut Literary Institute in Suffield, Connecticut. He later attended Oberlin College, after which he studied law in Kinderhook, New York, was admitted to the bar in 1851, and commenced practice in New York City with his older brother, Timothy Dwight Pelton He was a member of the Union League Club and Freemasons, and was active in business ventures including a rubber manufacturing company.

=== Congress ===
A Whig, in 1854 Pelton was elected to the Thirty-fourth Congress, March 4, 1855 to March 3, 1857. During his term, Pelton was a member of the Committee on Commerce. He was an unsuccessful candidate for reelection in 1856.

=== Death and burial ===
Pelton died while climbing Mary Mountain in Yellowstone National Park, Wyoming on July 24, 1890; he had visited the park while en route to his home in Massachusetts after a trip to Alaska. He was buried at Mahaiwe Cemetery in Great Barrington, Massachusetts.

== Family ==
In 1859, Pelton married Mary Childs Franklin, who died in 1866. In 1879, he married Angelina Scoville. With his first wife, Pelton was the father of a son, Franklin Dwight Pelton.

U.S. House of Representatives
Preceded by Hiram Walbridge	Member of the U.S. House of Representatives from New York's 3rd congressional district 1855–1857	Succeeded by Daniel Sickles
