= John Williams (Rochester, New York) =

American politician

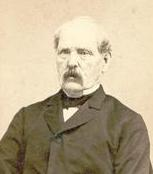

Member of the U.S. House of Representatives from New York's 29th district
- In office March 4, 1855 – March 3, 1857
- Preceded by: Davis Carpenter
- Succeeded by: Samuel G. Andrews

Personal details
- Born: January 7, 1807 Utica, New York, U.S.
- Died: March 26, 1875 (aged 67) Rochester, New York, U.S.
- Party: Democratic

John Williams (January 7, 1807, in Utica, Oneida County, New York – March 26, 1875) was an American merchant and politician from New York.

== Life ==
Williams was a partner of miller Warham Whitney (1786–1840), whose mill was at the second falls on the Genesee River. Williams married successively two of his partner's daughters, first Caroline (1812–1836) in 1832 and then Olive (1814–1867) in 1840.

He served as paymaster to New York's First Regiment of Riflemen starting in 1827. In 1838 he organized the Company of Western New York, known as "Williams' Light Infantry"; they were accepted as a State Battalion of Artillery in 1839 and Williams was commissioned as a major. The battalion was disbanded in 1849. In 1862 Williams was commissioned as brigadier general of the 25th Brigade, and was promoted in 1869 to major general of the 7th division.

He was Mayor of Rochester, New York, in 1853. He was elected as a Democrat to the 34th United States Congress, serving from March 4, 1855, to March 3, 1857. He also served several terms as treasurer of the city of Rochester and on the school board; John Williams School #5 in Rochester, now a kindergarten through eighth grade school, is named in his honor.

He was known to have corresponded with Susan B. Anthony.

Political offices
Preceded by Hamlin Stillwell	Mayor of Rochester, NY; 1853	Succeeded by Maltby Strong
U.S. House of Representatives
Preceded by Davis Carpenter	Member of the U.S. House of Representatives from New York's 29th congressional district 1855–1857	Succeeded by Samuel George Andrews
