= Andrew Oliver (New York politician) =

American politician

Member of the U.S. House of Representatives from New York's 26th district
- In office March 4, 1853 – March 3, 1857
- Preceded by: Henry S. Walbridge
- Succeeded by: Emory B. Pottle

Personal details
- Born: January 16, 1815 Springfield, New York, U.S.
- Died: March 6, 1889 (aged 74) Penn Yan, New York, U.S.
- Resting place: Penn Yan's Lake View Cemetery
- Party: Democratic
- Other political affiliations: American Party
- Education: Union College

Andrew Oliver (January 16, 1815 – March 6, 1889) was an American politician, attorney, and jurist who served two terms as a U.S. representative from New York from 1853 to 1857.

== Early life and education ==
Oliver was born on January 16, 1815 in Springfield, New York. In 1835 Oliver graduated from Union College in Schenectady, New York.

== Career ==
He studied law, was admitted to the bar and commenced practice in Penn Yan, New York in 1838. He served as judge of the Court of Common Pleas from 1843 to 1847. In 1846 he was judge of the Yates County surrogate and county courts.

=== Congress ===
Oliver was elected as a Democrat to the Thirty-third and Thirty-fourth Congresses (March 4, 1853 – March 3, 1857). He served as chairman of the Committee on Invalid Pensions (Thirty-fourth Congress).

He was an unsuccessful candidate on the American Party ticket for reelection in 1856 to the Thirty-fifth Congress.

=== Later career ===
He engaged in agricultural pursuits and also in the practice of law.

Oliver again served as county judge and surrogate judge from 1872 to 1877.

== Death ==
He died in Penn Yan on March 6, 1889. He was interred in Penn Yan's Lake View Cemetery.

== Sources ==
- United States Congress. "Andrew Oliver (id: O000070)". Biographical Directory of the United States Congress.

U.S. House of Representatives
Preceded by Henry S. Walbridge	Member of the U.S. House of Representatives from New York's 26th congressional district 1853–1857	Succeeded by Emory B. Pottle
