= Davis Carpenter =

American politician (1799–1878)

Member of the U.S. House of Representatives from New York's 29th district
- In office November 8, 1853 - March 3, 1855
- Preceded by: Azariah Boody
- Succeeded by: John Williams

Personal details
- Born: December 25, 1799 Walpole, New Hampshire, USA
- Died: October 22, 1878 (aged 78) Brockport, New York, USA
- Party: Whig

Davis Carpenter (December 25, 1799 – October 22, 1878) was a United States representative from New York.

Carpenter was born in Walpole, New Hampshire, on December 25, 1799, where he studied medicine. He graduated from Middlebury College, Vermont, in 1824, where he studied law. He was admitted to the bar and commenced practice in Brockport, New York.

Carpenter was elected as a Whig to the 33rd United States Congress to fill the vacancy caused by the resignation of Azariah Boody and served from November 8, 1853, to March 3, 1855. He was an unsuccessful candidate for reelection in 1854 to the 34th United States Congress. He engaged in the practice of medicine in Brockport, New York, where he died there October 22, 1878, and is interred in High Street Cemetery.

U.S. House of Representatives
Preceded by Azariah Boody	Member of the U.S. House of Representatives from New York's 29th congressional district 1853 - 1855	Succeeded by John Williams
