= Henry C. Goodwin =

American politician (1824–1860)

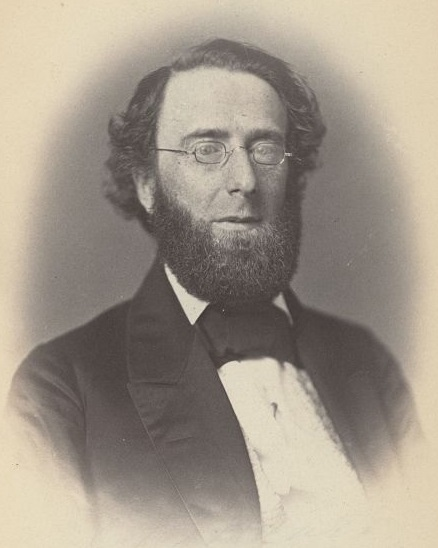

Member of the U.S. House of Representatives from New York's 22nd district
- In office March 4, 1857 – March 3, 1859
- Preceded by: Andrew Z. McCarty
- Succeeded by: M. Lindley Lee
- In office November 7, 1854 – March 3, 1855
- Preceded by: Gerrit Smith
- Succeeded by: Andrew Z. McCarty

Personal details
- Born: Henry Charles Goodwin; June 25, 1824 DeRuyter, New York, U.S.
- Died: November 12, 1860 (aged 36) Hamilton, New York, U.S.
- Resting place: Madison Street Cemetery, Hamilton, New York, U.S.
- Party: Republican
- Other political affiliations: Whig
- Profession: Politician, lawyer

Henry Charles Goodwin (June 25, 1824 – November 12, 1860) was a U.S. representative from New York.

Born in DeRuyter, New York, Goodwin completed preparatory studies. He studied law with Aretmas V. Bentley, was admitted to the bar in 1846 and commenced practice in Hamilton, New York. He served as district attorney of Madison County from 1847 to 1850.

Goodwin was elected as a Whig to the Thirty-third Congress to fill the vacancy caused by the resignation of Gerrit Smith and served from November 7, 1854, to March 3, 1855. He was elected as a Republican to the Thirty-fifth Congress (March 4, 1857 – March 3, 1859).

He resumed the practice of law and died in Hamilton on November 12, 1860. He was interred in Hamilton's Madison Street Cemetery.

U.S. House of Representatives
Preceded by Gerrit Smith	Member of the U.S. House of Representatives from New York's 22nd congressional district 1854–1855	Succeeded by Andrew Z. McCarty
Preceded by Andrew Z. McCarty	Member of the U.S. House of Representatives from New York's 22nd congressional district 1857–1859	Succeeded by M. Lindley Lee
