= 1863 United States Senate election in New York =

- February 3, 1863

158 votes in the New York State Legislature 80 votes needed to win
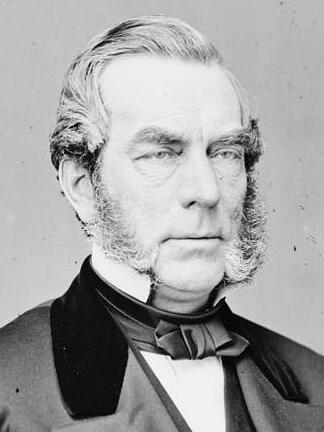

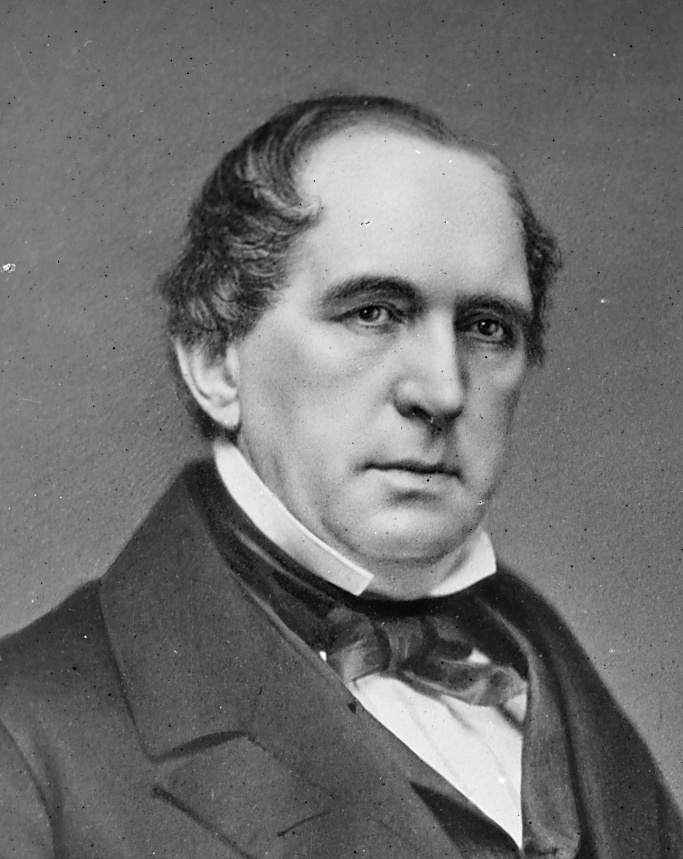
| Nominee | Edwin D. Morgan | Erastus Corning |
| Party | Union | Democratic |
| Joint ballot | 86 | 70 |
| Percentage | 54.4% | 44.3% |
Senator before election
Preston King
Republican
Elected Senator
Edwin D. Morgan
Union

The 1863 United States Senate election in New York was held on February 3, 1863. The Union candidate Edwin D. Morgan defeated the Democratic candidate Erastus Corning on the joint ballot of the Senate and the Assembly.

== Background ==
Republican Preston King was elected in 1857. King's term was due to expire on March 4, 1863, with the end of the 37th United States Congress.

The 86th New York State Legislature convened on January 6, 1863, following general elections held in 1862. Thirty senators elected in 1861 were held over from the 85th Legislature. The incoming legislature consisted of 23 Unionists and nine Democrats in the Senate and 64 Unionists and 64 Democrats in the Assembly.

A long struggle to elect a speaker ensued in the closely divided Assembly. The Union candidate Henry Sherwood and the Democratic candidate Gilbert Dean received 63 votes each on the first ballot. Voting continued for several days without a majority for either candidate. Failure to organize the chamber threatened to postpone the election of a U.S. senator indefinitely. Sherwood and Dean withdrew their candidacies on January 16; the Union members then switched their votes to Democrat Theophilus C. Callicot, in exchange for Callicot's support for the Union candidate in the senatorial election. A Democratic filibuster continued the contest until January 26, when Callicot defeated the replacement Democratic candidate Eliphaz Trimmer on the 92nd ballot.

== Nominations ==
=== Union Party ===
The Union members of the legislature held a caucus on February 2, 1863. Morgan, King, Daniel S. Dickinson, Charles B. Sedgwick, David D. Field, Henry J. Raymond, Ward Hunt, and Henry R. Selden were candidates. Morgan was nominated with a majority on the second ballot.

1863 New York Union U.S. senatorial caucus
| Candidate | U.S. senatorial ballot | | |
| Candidate | Informal | 1st | 2nd |
|---|---|---|---|
| Edwin D. Morgan | 25 | 39 | 50 |
| Preston King | 19 | 16 | 11 |
| Daniel S. Dickinson | 15 | 11 | 13 |
| Charles B. Sedgwick | 11 | 7 | 1 |
| David D. Field | 7 | 5 | 2 |
| Henry J. Raymond | 6 | 8 | 9 |
| Ward Hunt | 4 | —N/a | —N/a |
| Henry R. Selden | 1 | —N/a | —N/a |
| Blank | 1 | —N/a | —N/a |
| TOTAL | 89 | 86 | 86 |

=== Democratic Party ===
The Democratic members of the legislature held a caucus on February 2, 1863. The meeting found it inexpedient to nominate a candidate and advised members to vote their conscience in the senatorial election. The caucus met again on February 3 and voted to reconsider the previous day's motion. Erastus Corning defeated Fernando Wood on the first ballot.

1863 New York Democratic U.S. senatorial caucus
| Candidate | 1st |
|---|---|
| Erastus Corning | 28 |
| Fernando Wood | 25 |
| Scattering | 18 |
| TOTAL | 71 |

== General election ==
The Senate and the Assembly met separately on February 3 to hold an election for the next term. Morgan was nominated by the Senate with 23 votes to 7 for Corning.

In the Assembly, Morgan led on the first ballot with 64 votes, one less than a majority, Speaker Callicot having voted for John A. Dix. The Union members then switched their votes to Dix, who was nominated by the Assembly on the second ballot with 65 votes to 63 for Corning.

The two chambers being in disagreement, the Legislature convened in joint session. Morgan defeated Corning on the first joint ballot.

== Result ==
1863 United States Senate election in New York
| Party | Candidate | State Assembly | | | | State Senate | | Joint session | |
| Party | Candidate | 1st ballot | | 2nd ballot | | 1st ballot | | 1st ballot | |
| Party | Candidate | Votes | % | Votes | % | Votes | % | Votes | % |
|---|---|---|---|---|---|---|---|---|---|
| Union | Edwin D. Morgan | 64 | 50.00 | —N/a | | 23 | 76.67 | 86 | 54.43 |
| Democratic | Erastus Corning | 62 | 48.44 | 63 | 49.22 | 7 | 23.33 | 70 | 44.30 |
| Union | John A. Dix | 1 | 0.78 | 65 | 50.78 | —N/a | | 1 | 0.63 |
| Democratic | Fernando Wood | 1 | 0.78 | —N/a | | —N/a | | —N/a | |
| Union | Daniel S. Dickinson | —N/a | | —N/a | | —N/a | | 1 | 0.63 |
| Total votes | | 128 | 100.00 | 128 | 100.00 | 30 | 100.00 | 158 | 100.00 |
| Votes needed to win | | 65 | 50.01 | 65 | 50.01 | 16 | 50.01 | 80 | 50.01 |

== See also ==
- 1862–63 United States Senate elections

== Bibliography ==
=== Primary sources ===
- Greeley, Horace, ed. (1863). The Tribune Almanac and Political Register for 1863. New York.
- New York (1863a). Journal of the Senate [...]. Albany.
- New York (1863b). Journal of the Assembly [...]. Albany.

=== Secondary sources ===
- Congressional Quarterly (1985). Congressional Quarterly's Guide to U.S. Elections (2nd ed.). Washington D.C.: Congressional Quarterly. ISBN 978-0-87187-339-2.
