= Gilbert Deane =

Gilbert Deane may refer to:

- Gilbert Deane (priest), Anglican priest in Ireland
- Gilbert A. Deane, American politician from New York

== See also ==
- Gilbert Dean, American lawyer and politician from New York
