= Aaron K. Hughes =

American Navy admiral (1822–1906)

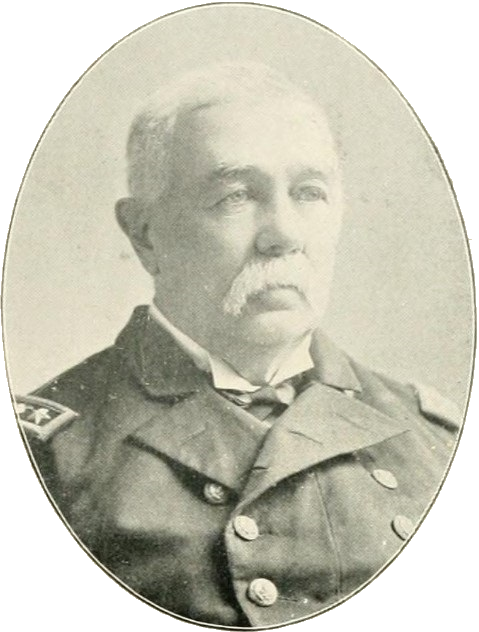
- Born: 31 March 1822; Elmira, New York
- Died: 4 May 1906 (aged 84) Washington, D.C.
- Allegiance: United States of America
- Branch: United States Navy; Union Navy
- Service years: 1838–1884
- Rank: Rear Admiral
- Commands: Pacific Squadron; Norfolk Navy Yard; Port Royal Naval Station; USS Pensacola; USS Ohio; USS Cimarron; USS Mohawk; USS Water Witch; Storm King; USS San Jacinto (Acting)
- Conflicts: Puget Sound War; American Civil War

Aaron Konkle Hughes (31 March 1822 – 4 May 1906) was a United States Navy rear admiral. He served as commander of the Pacific Squadron from 1883 to 1884. During the American Civil War, he commanded three Union Navy vessels.

== Biography ==
Hughes was born in Elmira, New York. On 20 October 1838, he was appointed as an acting midshipman from New York state by U.S. Congressman Hiram Gray. From January 1839 to November 1841, Hughes served aboard Commodore Alexander Claxton's flagship USS Constitution in the Pacific Squadron. From February to Autumn 1842, he was assigned to the schooner USS Boxer in the Gulf of Mexico and the West Indies.

From January to June 1843, Hughes served aboard the receiving ship USS Pennsylvania at the Norfolk Navy Yard. He was then assigned to the frigate USS Macedonian in the Africa Squadron until Winter 1844. On 28 May 1844, Hughes was promoted to passed midshipman. From Fall 1845 to Spring 1846, he served aboard the frigate USS Columbia along the coast of Brazil.

In Summer 1846, Hughes was assigned to the Office of Coast Survey. From Autumn 1846 to Summer 1848, he served aboard the steamer USS Michigan on the Great Lakes. From Fall 1849 to Summer 1850, Hughes was assigned to the receiving ship USS North Carolina at the New York Navy Yard. Promoted to acting master, he served aboard the sloop-of-war USS Albany in the Gulf of Mexico and the West Indies for twenty-five months until Autumn 1852.

From Winter 1852 to Summer 1853, Hughes was assigned to the receiving ship USS Ontario at the Baltimore Navy Yard. While there, he was promoted to master on 19 December 1852. After a leave of absence, Hughes was promoted to lieutenant on 18 October 1853. From December 1853 to August 1856, he served aboard the sloop-of-war USS Decatur in the Pacific Squadron. On 26 January 1856 under the leadership of Commander Guert Gansevoort, Hughes went ashore with seamen and marines at Seattle, Washington Territory to help repel an Indian attack on the settlers during the Puget Sound War.

From Winter 1856 to Fall 1857, Hughes served as executive officer on the receiving ship USS Allegheny at the Baltimore Navy Yard. He then served as a lieutenant and the executive officer on the stores ship USS Supply in the Brazil and Africa Squadrons until Autumn 1858. After a one-month leave, Hughes returned to the Allegheny at Baltimore as a lieutenant until June 1859. He next served aboard the screw frigate USS San Jacinto until January 1860 as the second lieutenant, the executive officer and, for about six weeks, as the commanding officer.

As part of the Africa Squadron, Hughes was transferred to the sloop-of-war USS Portsmouth as the executive officer until June 1860. Returning to the San Jacinto, he led the boarding party during the capture of the slave ship Storm King on 8 August 1860. As prize-master, Hughes sailed the brig to Monrovia, Liberia where the 619 freed Africans were turned over to Rev. John Seys, the U.S. government agent there. He then sailed her to Norfolk, Virginia, where she was sold at auction for $3,500.

From December 1860 to April 1861, Hughes was assigned to the receiving ship USS Princeton at the Philadelphia Navy Yard.

=== American Civil War ===
After the outbreak of the Civil War, Hughes was reassigned to the improvised man-of-war USS Ice Boat (formerly the Philadelphia city iceboat) under the command of Commander Oliver S. Glisson. From May to October 1861, he was assigned to the paddle frigate USS Mississippi in the Gulf Squadron as the second lieutenant and the executive officer. Hughes was then given command of the steamer USS Water Witch in the Gulf Squadron until April 1862. In November 1861, he attacked a grounded Confederate schooner while under fire from the guns of Fort Morgan, Alabama. In May 1862, Hughes was reassigned as commanding officer of the gunboat USS Mohawk in the South Atlantic Squadron after having sailed the Water Witch north for repairs.

Hughes was promoted to lieutenant commander effective 16 July 1862. On 9 November 1862, he supported a Union Army landing at St. Marys, Georgia to obtain lumber. After receiving gunfire from the Confederate garrison, Mohawk bombarded the town and forced the rebels to withdraw. On 16 November 1862, Hughes was promoted to commander. In June 1863, he was reassigned as commanding officer of the gunboat USS Cimarron in the South Atlantic Squadron. On 17 August 1863, Cimarron participated in an attack on the fortifications at Charleston, South Carolina.

In October 1864, Hughes was detached from the Cimarron to serve as ordnance officer for the Mississippi Squadron on the staff of acting Rear Adm. S. P. Lee until February 1865. He then served as the executive officer of the Mound City Naval Station in Illinois until February 1866.

=== Post-war career ===
In April 1866, Hughes was assigned as a member of the Naval General Court Martial at Philadelphia, serving until June 1866. In August 1866, he was reassigned as lighthouse inspector for the Sixth Lighthouse District based at Charleston, South Carolina until August 1868.

On 10 February 1869, Hughes was promoted to captain. In 1870, he was given command of the receiving ship USS Ohio at the Boston Navy Yard. From 1872 to 1874, Hughes served as commanding officer of the screw steamer USS Pensacola in the Pacific Squadron. On 4 February 1875, he was promoted to commodore. From 1877 to 1878, Hughes served as commandant of the Port Royal Naval Station on Parris Island in South Carolina. From 1879 to 1882, he was commandant of the Norfolk Navy Yard.

On 2 July 1882, Hughes was promoted to rear admiral. From 1883 to 1884, he commanded the Pacific Squadron. His flagship was the USS Hartford. Hughes retired from active duty on 31 March 1884, having reached the mandatory retirement age of sixty-two.

Hughes was a companion of the Military Order of the Loyal Legion of the United States.

== Personal ==
Hughes was the son of John Hughes, who was born in Ireland, and Anna (Konkle) Hughes. His uncle, Aaron Konkle, was an attorney in Elmira, New York. His older brother, George Wurtz Hughes, was a civil engineer, U.S. Army officer and U.S. Congressman from Maryland.

Hughes married Anna "Annie" Humphreys (15 September 1823 – 6 August 1856). They had two daughters, one of whom died in infancy. After his wife's death, he married Marion D. Whelden (2 February 1838 – 11 March 1906).

Hughes died at his home in Washington, D.C. two months after his second wife. He was survived by three daughters and two sons. Hughes and his second wife are buried at Arlington National Cemetery.
