= 86th New York State Legislature =

New York state legislative session

←	85th	87th	→
- The Old State Capitol (1879)

Overview
- Legislative body: New York State Legislature
- Jurisdiction: New York, United States
- Term: January 1 – December 31, 1863

Senate
- Members: 32
- President: Lt. Gov. David R. Floyd-Jones (D)
- Temporary President: James A. Bell (R), from January 21
- Party control: Republican (23-8)

Assembly
- Members: 128
- Speaker: Theophilus C. Callicot (D)
- Party control: split (64-64)

Sessions
- 1st: January 6 – April 25, 1863

The 86th New York State Legislature, consisting of the New York State Senate and the New York State Assembly, met from January 6 to April 25, 1863, during the first year of Horatio Seymour's second tenure as Governor of New York, in Albany.

== Background ==
Under the provisions of the New York Constitution of 1846, 32 Senators and 128 assemblymen were elected in single-seat districts; senators for a two-year term, assemblymen for a one-year term. The senatorial districts were made up of entire counties, except New York County (four districts) and Kings County (two districts). The Assembly districts were made up of entire towns, or city wards, forming a contiguous area, all within the same county.

At this time there were two major political parties: the Republican Party and the Democratic Party. The Democrats split over the civil war issue. The "War Democrats" and the Republicans formed a coalition known as the "Republican Union," and supported President Abraham Lincoln and the Union Army's war effort; the rump Democratic Party opposed the war, favoring a compromise with the South, and became known as "Peace Democrats" or "Copperheads." The Constitutional Union (consisting of former "Silver Gray" Whigs and Know Nothings) held a state convention and joined the Peace Democrats.

== Elections ==
The 1862 New York state election was held on November 4. With a large contingent of soldiers at the Civil War front, who did not vote at the state election, surprisingly all five statewide elective offices up for election were carried by the Democrats, including Gov. Horatio Seymour and Lt. Gov. David R. Floyd-Jones. The approximate party strength at this election, expressed by the vote for Governor, was: Democrats/Constitutional Union 307,000; Republican Union 296,000.

64 Union Republicans and 64 Democrats were elected to the Assembly, resulting in a split.

== Sessions ==
The Legislature met for the regular session at the Old State Capitol in Albany on January 6, 1863; and adjourned on April 25.

On January 21, James A. Bell (R) was re-elected President pro tempore of the State Senate.

On January 26, after three weeks of deadlock, Democrat Theophilus C. Callicot (D) was elected Speaker on the 92nd ballot, receiving the votes of the Republicans. Callicot had talked to the Republican leader Chauncey M. Depew, and offered a deal: the Republicans should elect him Speaker, and he would help them to elect a U.S. Senator.

1863 Speaker election result
Ballot	Date	Gilbert Dean Dem.	Henry Sherwood Rep.	-	Ballot	Date	Gilbert Dean Dem.	Henry Sherwood Rep.	Theophilus C. Callicot Fusion	Eliphaz Trimmer Dem.	Chauncey M. Depew Rep.
1st	Jan. 6	63	63		47th	Jan. 10	41	41			
2nd	Jan. 6	63	63		48th	Jan. 10	41	41			
3rd	Jan. 6	63	63		49th	Jan. 12	40	40			
4th	Jan. 7	63	63		50th	Jan. 12	40	40			
5th	Jan. 7	63	63		51st	Jan. 12	39	39			
6th	Jan. 7	63	63		52nd	Jan. 12	39	39			
7th	Jan. 7	63	63		53rd	Jan. 12	39	39			
8th	Jan. 8	63	63		54th	Jan. 13	56	56			
9th	Jan. 8	63	63		55th	Jan. 13	55	55			
10th	Jan. 8	63	63		56th	Jan. 13	55	55			
11th	Jan. 8	63	63		57th	Jan. 13	55	55			
12th	Jan. 8	63	63		58th	Jan. 13	55	55			
13th	Jan. 8	63	63		59th	Jan. 13	54	54			
14th	Jan. 8	63	63		60th	Jan. 13	55	55			
15th	Jan. 8	63	63		61st	Jan. 13	55	55			
16th	Jan. 8	63	63		62nd	Jan. 13	55	55			
17th	Jan. 8	63	63		63rd	Jan. 13	55	55			
18th	Jan. 8	63	63		64th	Jan. 12	54	54			
19th	Jan. 8	63	63		65th	Jan. 13	54	54			
20th	Jan. 8	63	63		66th	Jan. 13	54	54			
21st	Jan. 8	63	63		67th	Jan. 14	63	63			
22nd	Jan. 8	63	63		68th	Jan. 14	62	62			
23rd	Jan. 8	63	63		69th	Jan. 14	62	62			
24th	Jan. 8	63	63		70th	Jan. 12	62	62			
25th	Jan. 8	63	63		71st	Jan. 14	62	62			
26th	Jan. 8	63	63		72nd	Jan. 14	62	62			
27th	Jan. 9	61	61		73rd	Jan. 14	60	60			
28th	Jan. 9	61	61		74th	Jan. 14	60	60			
29th	Jan. 9	62	62		75th	Jan. 15	62	62			
30th	Jan. 9	62	62		76th	Jan. 15	57	57			
31st	Jan. 9	62	62		77th	Jan. 15	60	60			
32nd	Jan. 9	62	62		78th	Jan. 15	58	58			
33rd	Jan. 9	62	62		79th	Jan. 23			60	60	2
34th	Jan. 9	62	62		80th	Jan. 23			60	60	2
35th	Jan. 9	60	60		81st	Jan. 23			60	61	3
36th	Jan. 9	60	60		82nd	Jan. 23			61	61	2
37th	Jan. 9	60	60		83rd	Jan. 23			61	61	2
38th	Jan. 10	47	47		84th	Jan. 23			61	61	2
39th	Jan. 10	44	44		85th	Jan. 23			61	61	2
40th	Jan. 10	44	44		86th	Jan. 23			61	61	2
41st	Jan. 10	44	44		87th	Jan. 23			60	60	2
42nd	Jan. 10	43	43		88th	Jan. 23			60	60	2
43rd	Jan. 10	44	44		89th	Jan. 23			59	59	2
44th	Jan. 10	42	42		90th	Jan. 23			60	60	2
45th	Jan. 10	42	42		91st	Jan. 24			60	60	1
46th	Jan. 10	42	42		92nd	Jan. 26			61	59	

On February 3, the Legislature elected Ex-Governor Edwin D. Morgan (R) to succeed Preston King (R) as U.S. Senator from New York for a six-year term beginning on March 4, 1863.

== State Senate ==
=== Districts ===
- 1st District: Queens, Richmond and Suffolk counties
- 2nd District: 1st, 2nd, 3rd, 4th, 5th, 7th, 11th, 13th and 19th wards of the City of Brooklyn
- 3rd District: 6th, 8th, 9th, 10th, 12th, 14th, 15th, 16th, 17th and 18th wards of the City of Brooklyn; and all towns in Kings County
- 4th District: 1st, 2nd, 3rd, 4th, 5th, 6th, 7th, 8th and 14th wards of New York City
- 5th District: 10th, 11th, 13th and 17th wards of New York City
- 6th District: 9th, 15th, 16th and 18th wards of New York City
- 7th District: 12th, 19th, 20th, 21st and 22nd wards of New York City
- 8th District: Putnam, Rockland and Westchester counties
- 9th District: Orange and Sullivan counties
- 10th District: Greene and Ulster counties
- 11th District: Columbia and Dutchess counties
- 12th District: Rensselaer and Washington counties
- 13th District: Albany County
- 14th District: Delaware, Schenectady and Schoharie counties
- 15th District: Fulton, Hamilton, Montgomery and Saratoga counties
- 16th District: Clinton, Essex and Warren counties
- 17th District: Franklin and St. Lawrence counties
- 18th District: Jefferson and Lewis counties
- 19th District: Oneida County
- 20th District: Herkimer and Otsego counties
- 21st District: Oswego County
- 22nd District: Onondaga County
- 23rd District: Chenango, Cortland and Madison counties
- 24th District: Broome, Tompkins and Tioga counties
- 25th District: Cayuga and Wayne counties
- 26th District: Ontario, Seneca and Yates counties
- 27th District: Chemung, Schuyler and Steuben counties
- 28th District: Monroe County
- 29th District: Genesee, Niagara and Orleans counties
- 30th District: Allegany, Livingston and Wyoming counties
- 31st District: Erie County
- 32nd District: Cattaraugus and Chautauqua counties
Note: There are now 62 counties in the State of New York. The counties which are not mentioned in this list had not yet been established, or sufficiently organized, the area being included in one or more of the abovementioned counties.

=== Members ===
The asterisk (*) denotes members of the previous Legislature who continued in office as members of this Legislature.

Party affiliations follow the vote for U.S. Senator.

District	Senator	Party	Notes
1st	Monroe Henderson*		due to ill health, did not take his seat at this session
2nd	Jesse C. Smith*	Republican	
3rd	Henry C. Murphy*	Democrat	
4th	Christian B. Woodruff*	Democrat	
5th	Charles G. Cornell*	Democrat	also New York City Street Commissioner
6th	John J. Bradley*	Democrat	
7th	Richard B. Connolly*	Democrat	
8th	Hezekiah D. Robertson*	Republican	
9th	Henry R. Low*	Republican	
10th	Jacob S. Freer*	Democrat	
11th	William H. Tobey*	Republican	
12th	Ralph Richards*	Republican	
13th	John V. L. Pruyn*	Democrat	
14th	Joseph H. Ramsey*	Republican	
15th	William Clark	Republican	elected to fill vacancy, in place of John Willard
16th	Russell M. Little*	Republican	
17th	Charles C. Montgomery*	Republican	
18th	James A. Bell*	Republican	
19th	Alexander H. Bailey*	Republican	
20th	George A. Hardin*	Republican	
21st	Richard K. Sanford*	Republican	
22nd	Allen Munroe*	Republican	
23rd	Henry A. Clark*	Republican	
24th	Lyman Truman*	Republican	
25th	Chauncey M. Abbott*	Republican	died on November 11, 1863
26th	Charles J. Folger*	Republican	
27th	Charles Cook*	Republican	
28th	Lysander Farrar*	Republican	
29th	Almanzor Hutchinson*	Republican	
30th	Wilkes Angel*	Republican	
31st	John Ganson*	Democrat	on November 4, 1862, elected to the 38th U.S. Congress
32nd	Horace C. Young*	Republican	

=== Employees ===
- Clerk: James Terwilliger
- Sergeant-at-Arms: Richard U. Owens
- Assistant Sergeant-at-Arms: Caleb S. Babcock
- Doorkeeper: Orville Griffin
- First Assistant Doorkeeper: Charles Johnson
- Second Assistant Doorkeeper: Sanders Wilson
- Third Assistant Doorkeeper: Giles H. Holden

== State Assembly ==
=== Assemblymen ===
The asterisk (*) denotes members of the previous Legislature who continued as members of this Legislature.

Party affiliations follow the original vote for Speaker.

District		Assemblymen	Party	Notes
Albany	1st	William J. Snyder	Democrat	
Albany	2nd	John Cutler	Democrat	
Albany	3rd	Henry L. Wait	Democrat	
Albany	4th	William L. Oswald	Democrat	
Allegany	1st	Alvah E. Cruttenden*	Republican	
Allegany	2nd	Edward D. Loveridge*	Republican	
Broome		Francis B. Smith	Republican	
Cattaraugus	1st	Andrew L. Allen*	Republican	
Cattaraugus	2nd	Albert G. Dow	Republican	
Cayuga	1st	George I. Post	Republican	
Cayuga	2nd	William P. Robinson	Republican	
Chautauqua	1st	John Steward	Republican	
Chautauqua	2nd	Henry C. Lake*	Republican	
Chemung		Charles Hulett	Democrat	
Chenango	1st	Elizur H. Prindle	Republican	
Chenango	2nd	Francis B. Fisher*	Republican	
Clinton		George Adgate	Democrat	
Columbia	1st	Peter G. Kisselbrack	Democrat	
Columbia	2nd	Elias W. Bostwick	Republican	
Cortland		Henry B. Van Hoesen	Republican	
Delaware	1st	Robert W. Courtney	Republican	
Delaware	2nd	Francis R. Gilbert	Democrat	
Dutchess	1st	Luther S. Dutcher	Democrat	
Dutchess	2nd	Joseph C. Doughty	Democrat	
Erie	1st	John W. Murphy*	Democrat	
Erie	2nd	Horatio Seymour*	Democrat	
Erie	3rd	Timothy A. Hopkins	Democrat	
Erie	4th	Anson G. Conger	Republican	
Essex		Palmer E. Havens*	Republican	
Franklin		Albert Andrus*	Republican	
Fulton and Hamilton		Willard J. Heacock	Republican	
Genesee		Loren Green	Republican	
Greene		Luke Roe	Democrat	
Herkimer	1st	Griffin Sweet	Republican	
Herkimer	2nd	Archibald C. McGowan	Republican	
Jefferson	1st	Charles A. Benjamin	Republican	
Jefferson	2nd	Levi Miller	Republican	
Jefferson	3rd	William Dewey*	Republican	
Kings	1st	John Paulding	Democrat	
Kings	2nd	Bernard Hughes	Democrat	
Kings	3rd	Samuel E. Johnson	Democrat	
Kings	4th	James Darcy*	Democrat	died on September 1, 1863
Kings	5th	Theophilus C. Callicot	Democrat	elected Speaker
Kings	6th	Henry C. Boswell	Democrat	
Kings	7th	Charles P. Leslie	Democrat	
Lewis		John Chickering	Republican	
Livingston	1st	Hamilton E. Smith	Republican	
Livingston	2nd	Samuel Skinner*	Republican	
Madison	1st	William H. Brand*	Republican	
Madison	2nd	George L. Rouse	Republican	
Monroe	1st	George E. McGonegal*	Republican	
Monroe	2nd	Eliphaz Trimmer*	Democrat	
Monroe	3rd	William Brown	Republican	
Montgomery		Freeman P. Moulton	Democrat	
New York	1st	Cornelius Flynn	Democrat	
New York	2nd	Daniel Leamy*	Democrat	
New York	3rd	George L. Loutrel*	Democrat	
New York	4th	William C. Gover	Democrat	
New York	5th	Henry Rogers	Democrat	
New York	6th	Julius Korn	Democrat	
New York	7th	Vincent C. King	Democrat	
New York	8th	Thomas H. Hill	Democrat	
New York	9th	David V. Freeman	Democrat	
New York	10th	Daniel M. O'Brien*	Democrat	
New York	11th	Thomas A. Ledwith	Democrat	
New York	12th	Andrew Smith*	Democrat	
New York	13th	Alexander Ward*	Democrat	
New York	14th	Robert C. Hutchings	Democrat	
New York	15th	Gilbert Dean	Democrat	
New York	16th	Michael McCann	Democrat	
New York	17th	Thomas C. Fields	Democrat	also a Central Park Commissioner
Niagara	1st	Benjamin H. Fletcher*	Democrat	
Niagara	2nd	William Morgan	Republican	
Oneida	1st	Abram B. Weaver	Democrat	
Oneida	2nd	Daniel M. Prescott	Republican	
Oneida	3rd	Asa S. Sherman	Democrat	
Oneida	4th	Isaac McDougall	Republican	
Onondaga	1st	James M. Munro	Republican	
Onondaga	2nd	Elizur Clark	Democrat	
Onondaga	3rd	Joseph Breed	Republican	
Ontario	1st	Perez H. Field	Republican	
Ontario	2nd	Lanson Dewey	Republican	
Orange	1st	John D. Van Buren	Democrat	
Orange	2nd	Charles S. Woodward	Democrat	
Orleans		John Parks	Republican	
Oswego	1st	Abner C. Mattoon	Republican	
Oswego	2nd	Hiram W. Loomis	Republican	
Oswego	3rd	Harvey Palmer	Republican	
Otsego	1st	William Brooks	Democrat	
Otsego	2nd	Cornelius A. Church*	Republican	
Putnam		Saxton Smith	Democrat	also Supervisor of Putnam Valley
Queens	1st	Charles T. Duryea	Democrat	
Queens	2nd	Henry S. Lott	Democrat	
Rensselaer	1st	James McKeon	Democrat	
Rensselaer	2nd	John A. Quackenbush	Republican	
Rensselaer	3rd	Ebenezer S. Strait	Democrat	
Richmond		Theodore Frean	Democrat	
Rockland		James S. Haring*	Democrat	
St. Lawrence	1st	Elias P. Townsley*	Republican	
St. Lawrence	2nd	James Redington*	Republican	
St. Lawrence	3rd	Abraham X. Parker	Republican	
Saratoga	1st	Ira Brockett	Democrat	
Saratoga	2nd	Nathaniel M. Houghton*	Republican	
Schenectady		John McShea Jr.	Democrat	
Schoharie		Stephen L. Mayham	Democrat	
Schuyler		Samuel Lawrence	Republican	
Seneca		James McLean	Democrat	
Steuben	1st	John W. Taggart	Republican	
Steuben	2nd	Henry Sherwood*	Republican	
Steuben	3rd	Horace Bemis	Republican	
Suffolk	1st	Benjamin F. Wiggins	Republican	
Suffolk	2nd	John S. Havens*	Democrat	
Sullivan		William Gillespie	Democrat	
Tioga		Nathaniel W. Davis	Republican	
Tompkins		Ezra Cornell*	Republican	
Ulster	1st	Jesse F. Bookstaver*	Democrat	
Ulster	2nd	Jacob LeFever	Republican	
Ulster	3rd	Ebenezer Westbrook*	Democrat	
Warren		Newton Aldrich	Republican	
Washington	1st	Asa C. Tefft	Republican	
Washington	2nd	Ervin Hopkins Jr.	Republican	
Wayne	1st	Thaddeus W. Collins	Republican	
Wayne	2nd	Lemuel Durfee	Republican	
Westchester	1st	Pierre C. Talman*	Democrat	
Westchester	2nd	John E. Marshall	Democrat	
Westchester	3rd	Chauncey M. Depew*	Republican	on November 3, 1863, elected Secretary of State of New York
Wyoming		Byron Healy	Republican	
Yates		Guy Shaw	Republican	

=== Employees ===
- Clerk: Joseph B. Cushman
- Sergeant-at-Arms: Levi M. Gano
- Doorkeeper: Charles E. Young
- First Assistant Doorkeeper: Alexander Frier
- Second Assistant Doorkeeper: Willard L. Cook

== Sources ==
- The New York Civil List compiled by Franklin Benjamin Hough, Stephen C. Hutchins and Edgar Albert Werner (1870; see pg. 439 for Senate districts; pg. 443 for senators; pg. 450–463 for Assembly districts; and pg. 497ff for assemblymen)
- Journal of the Senate (86th Session) (1863)
- Journal of the Assembly (86th Session) (1863)
- Biographical Sketches of the State Officers and the Members of the Legislature of the State of New York in 1862 and '63 by William D. Murphy (1863)
