= Senator Mattoon =

Senator Mattoon may refer to:

- Abner C. Mattoon (1814–1895), New York State Senate
- Ebenezer Mattoon (1755–1843), Massachusetts State Senate
