= Ransom Halloway =

American politician

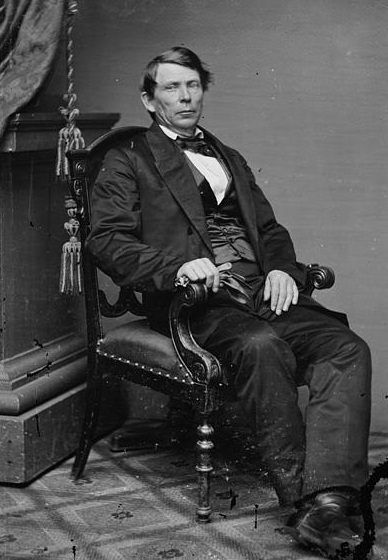
- Halloway in 1851

Member of the U.S. House of Representatives from New York's 8th district
- In office March 4, 1849 – March 3, 1851
- Preceded by: Cornelius Warren
- Succeeded by: Gilbert Dean

Personal details
- Born: c. 1793 Pawling, New York, U.S.
- Died: April 6, 1851 (aged 57–58) Mount Pleasant, Upper Marlboro, Maryland, U.S.
- Party: Whig
- Spouses: Rebecca Dodge (m. 1820; died 1843) Eliza Waring (m. 1851)

Ransom Halloway (c. 1793 – April 6, 1851) was an American politician who was a United States representative from New York from 1849 to 1851.

== Early life ==
Halloway was born in Pawling, Dutchess County. His name is sometimes spelled "Holloway." After the deaths of their parents, Ransom and his sister were raised by relatives.

== Career ==
He settled in Beekman, where he farmed and worked as a hat maker. He was also active in the state militia, and was appointed paymaster of the 30th Brigade in 1818.

Halloway was elected as a Whig to the Thirty-first Congress, holding office from March 4, 1849, to March 3, 1851.

== Personal life ==
In 1820, he married Rebecca Dodge, a daughter of Joseph and Ann Dodge, who died on August 5, 1843.

In 1851, a few months before his death, he married Eliza Genevieve Waring of Mount Pleasant in Prince George's County, Maryland. His second wife's name appears in some accounts as "Warren."

He died on April 6, 1851, in Upper Marlboro, Maryland, at Mount Pleasant, the home of his second wife. He was buried next to his first wife at the Dodge Family Cemetery in Pawling.

U.S. House of Representatives
Preceded by Cornelius Warren	Member of the U.S. House of Representatives from New York's 8th congressional district 1849–1851	Succeeded by Gilbert Dean
