= Senator Wolcott =

Senator Wolcott may refer to:

== Members of the United States Senate ==
- Edward O. Wolcott (1848–1905), U.S. Senator from Colorado from 1889 to 1901
- Josiah O. Wolcott (1877–1938), U.S. Senator from Delaware from 1917 to 1921

== United States state senate members ==
- John J. Wolcott (1810–1881), New York State Senate from 1866 to 1867
