= George W. Hughes =

American politician

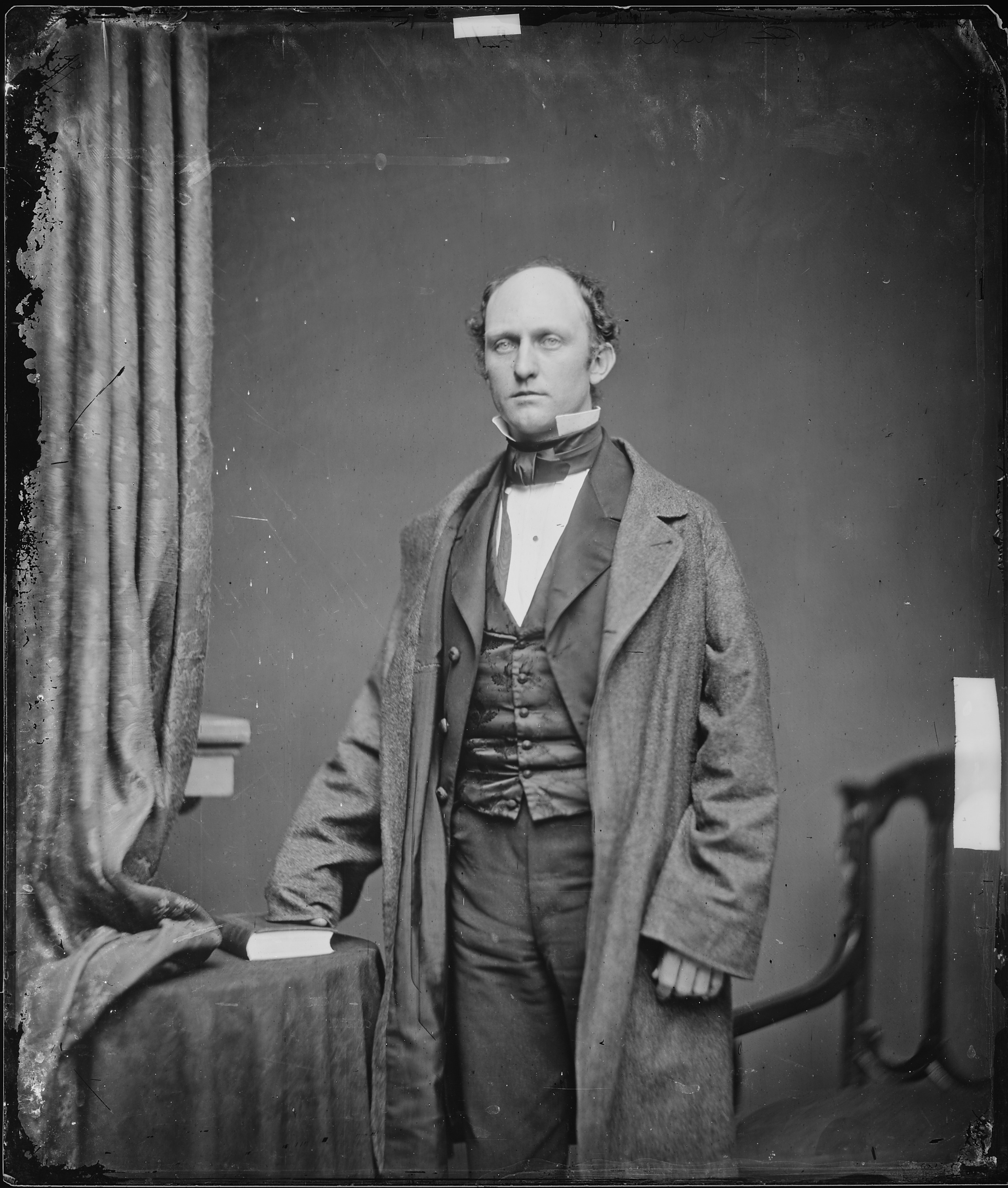
George W. Hughes, circa 1860s

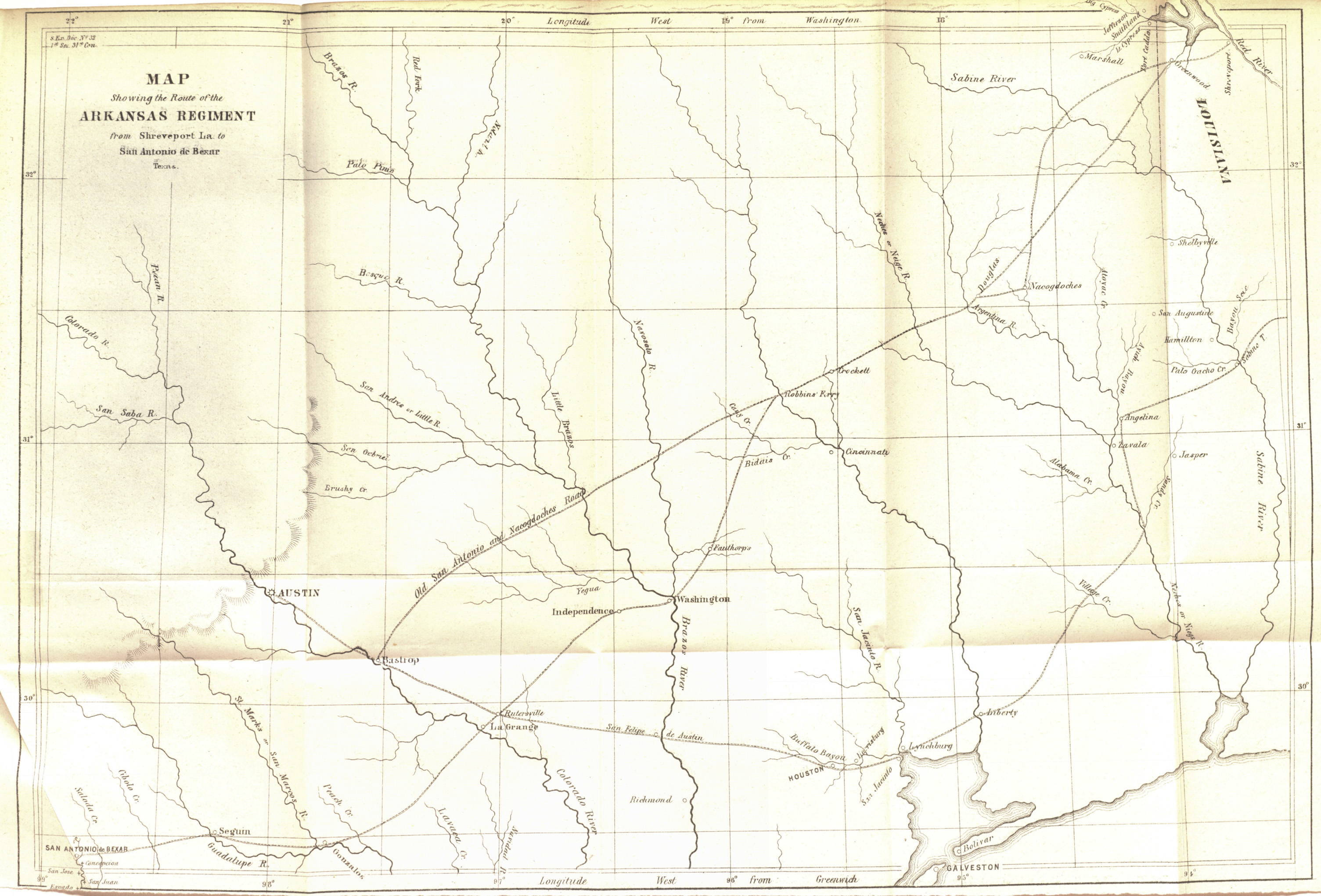
Hughes' Map Showing the Route of the Arkansas Regiment, 1846-1850

George Wurtz Hughes (September 30, 1806 – September 3, 1870) was a U.S. representative from the 6th congressional district of Maryland.

Born in Elmira, New York, Hughes received a liberal schooling. He attended the United States Military Academy at West Point from 1823 to 1827, having been appointed by Caleb Baker, but was not commissioned and instead became a civil engineer in New York City. In 1829, Hughes began to work for the New York State Canal Commission.

Hughes was appointed to the United States Army on July 7, 1838, as captain of Topographical Engineers. In 1840, he was sent to Europe by the War Department on an inspection tour of mines, public works and military fortifications. Hughes subsequently served in the Mexican–American War, acting as chief engineer on the staff of General John E. Wool in 1846 and General William J. Worth in 1847. He was brevetted major of Topographical Engineers on April 18, 1847, for gallant and meritorious conduct during the Battle of Cerro Gordo. Hughes was promoted to lieutenant colonel of a regiment of Maryland and District of Columbia Volunteers on August 4, 1847, and to colonel on October 1, 1847. In December 1847, he was appointed civil and military governor of the Department of Jalapa and Perote in Veracruz. Hughes was later brevetted lieutenant colonel of Topographical Engineers on May 30, 1848, for meritorious conduct while in Mexico. He was honorably mustered out of the volunteer service on July 24, 1848. From 1849 to 1850, he served as chief engineer of the Panama Railroad, resigning from the regular army on August 4, 1851.

In 1853, Hughes was sent to Europe as a representative of the Crystal Palace Association. In 1854, he became president of the Northern Central Railway. In 1855, Hughes was appointed quartermaster general of the Maryland militia. In 1856, he was promoted to brigadier general in the militia. Hughes was later elected as a Democrat to the Thirty-sixth Congress from the 6th Congressional district of Maryland, serving one term from March 4, 1859, to March 3, 1861. He worked as a consulting engineer and planter at West River, Maryland until his death there. The son in law of Virgil Maxcy, he is interred in the family burying ground of the Galloway and Maxcy families, Tulip Hill, at West River.

== Personal ==
Hughes was the son of John Hughes, who was born in Ireland, and Anna (Konkle) Hughes. She was the daughter of John Konkle and Annie (Wurtz) Konkle. He had a younger brother, Aaron Konkle Hughes, who served as a lieutenant commander in the Union Navy and retired as a rear admiral.

Hughes married Ann Sarah Maxcy, who travelled with him on his inspection tour of Europe. Their eldest son, Maxcy Galloway Hughes (1841–1863), was born in Europe. He served as a lieutenant in the Confederate States Army and was an assistant ordinance officer on the staff of General John B. Magruder in the District of Texas, New Mexico and Arizona.

U.S. House of Representatives
Preceded by Thomas Fielder Bowie	U.S. Congressman from the 6th district of Maryland; 1859–1861	Succeeded by Charles Benedict Calvert
