= Elias Root =

American politician

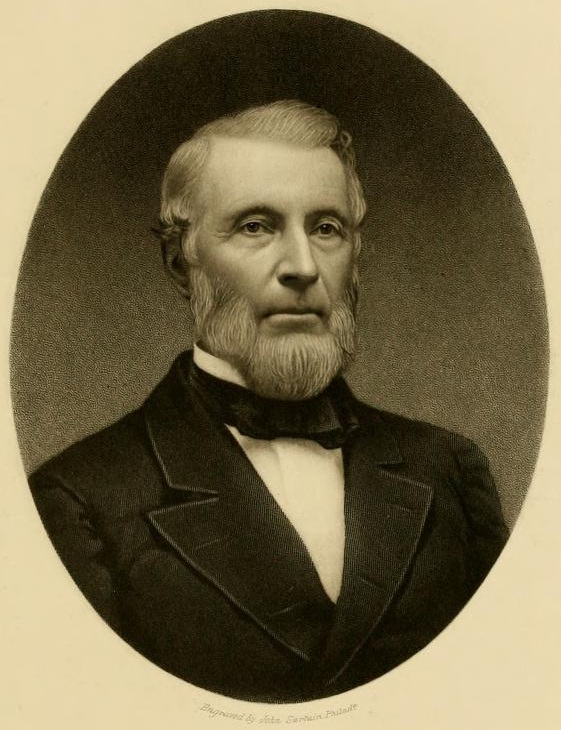
Elias Root (1877)

Elias Root (November 30, 1806 – September 10, 1880) was an American businessman and politician from New York.

== Life ==
He was born on November 30, 1806, in Fort Ann, Washington County, New York. He attended the Fort Ann village school and the Rutland County grammar school. Then he enrolled at the United States Military Academy in West Point, but left after one year due to ill health. He taught school for two years in Newburgh, and then became a merchant there. On January 14, 1830, he married Lydia Noyes (died 1871), and they had three children.

Later he moved to Mohawk, and there engaged in the wholesale and forwarding business. He was Supervisor of the Town of German Flatts. He was also Vice President of the Mohawk Valley Bank. In 1856, he moved to Oswego, where he continued his business, and was President of the Marine Bank, later the National Marine Bank, for many years.

Root was a member of the New York State Assembly (Oswego Co., 1st D.) in 1862 and 1865; and Collector of the Port of Oswego for six years.

On March 20, 1873, he married Mary A. Chalmers.

He died on September 10, 1880, at his home in Oswego, New York.

New York State Assembly
Preceded by DeWitt C. Littlejohn	New York State Assembly; Oswego County, 1st District; 1862	Succeeded by Abner C. Mattoon
Preceded by Abner C. Mattoon	New York State Assembly; Oswego County, 1st District; 1865	Succeeded by DeWitt C. Littlejohn
