= Cornelius Warren =

American politician

Cornelius Warren (March 15, 1790 – July 28, 1849) was an American politician and judge who was a United States representative from New York from 1847 to 1849.

== Biography ==
Born in Phillipstown in Putnam County, Warren completed preparatory studies, studied law, was admitted to the bar and commenced the practice of law.

He served in local offices including Justice of the Peace, and was appointed judge of the Putnam County Court of Common Pleas in 1841 and served until 1843. He was elected as a Whig to the Thirtieth Congress, holding office from March 4, 1847, to March 3, 1849.

Warren died at Cold Spring, and was interred in the Old Cemetery.

Warren's daughter Hannah M. was married to New York state senator Charles A. Fowler.

U.S. House of Representatives
Preceded by William W. Woodworth	Member of the U.S. House of Representatives from New York's 8th congressional district 1847–1849	Succeeded by Ransom Halloway
