= USS San Jacinto (1850) =

Screw frigate in the US Navy famous for her role in the Trent Affair of 1861

- San Jacinto (center) stopping RMS Trent

History

United States
- Name: USS San Jacinto
- Builder: New York Navy Yard
- Laid down: August 1847
- Launched: 16 April 1850
- Commissioned: late 1851/early 1852
- Fate: Ran aground, 1 January 1865

General characteristics
- Type: Screw frigate
- Tonnage: 1567
- Length: 234 ft (71 m)
- Beam: 37 ft 9 in (11.51 m)
- Draft: 16 ft 6 in (5.03 m)
- Depth of hold: 23 ft 3 in (7.09 m)
- Propulsion: Steam engine, screw propeller
- Speed: 8 knots (15 km/h; 9.2 mph)
- Complement: 235 officers and enlisted
- Armament: 6 × 8 in (200 mm) Smoothbore guns

General characteristics 1862
- Armament: 1 × 11 in (280 mm) Smoothbore gun; 10 × 9 in (230 mm) Smoothbore guns; 1 × 12 pdr Rifle

General characteristics Dec 1863
- Armament: 1 × 100 pdr Rifle • 10 × 9 in (230 mm) Smoothbore guns; 1 × 20 pdr Rifle

The first USS San Jacinto was an early screw frigate in the United States Navy during the mid-19th century. She was named for the San Jacinto River, site of the Battle of San Jacinto during the Texas Revolution. She is perhaps best known for her role in the Trent Affair of 1861.

San Jacinto was laid down by the New York Navy Yard in August 1847 and launched on 16 April 1850. She was sponsored by Commander Charles H. Bell, Executive Officer of the New York Navy Yard.

== European service, 1852–1854 ==
No record of San Jacinto's commissioning ceremony has been found, but her first commanding officer, Captain Thomas Crabbe, reported aboard on 18 November 1851. The earliest page of the ship's log which has survived is dated 26 February 1852, but San Jacinto's service began earlier. Some evidence suggests that the frigate got under way for test runs late in 1851.

Built as an experimental ship to test new propulsion concepts, the screw frigate was plagued by balky engines and unreliable machinery throughout her career. Yet, San Jacinto crowded her record with valuable service.

The steamer sailed from New York on New Year's Day, 1852, and headed for Norfolk, Virginia on a trial voyage to test her seaworthiness and machinery before heading across the Atlantic for service in the Mediterranean Sea. She encountered heavy weather during the passage to Hampton Roads, and one of her engines was disabled. After repairs at the Norfolk Navy Yard, the frigate finally passed between the Virginia Capes on 3 March and headed for Cádiz, Spain. However, chronic engine problems hampered the ship during her operations in European waters; and she returned to Philadelphia, Pennsylvania on 5 July 1853. She was decommissioned there on the 13th for installation of new machinery.

Four days after recommissioning on 5 August 1854, San Jacinto sailed eastward to try her new engines. Following repairs at Southampton, England, she resumed her cruise in European waters.

== Home Squadron and West Indies Squadron, 1855 ==
In the spring of 1855, San Jacinto was briefly attached to the Home Squadron and served in the West Indies Squadron as flagship for Commodore Charles S. McCauley to bolster American naval strength in the Caribbean after Spanish frigate, Ferrolana, had fired upon United States mail steamer, El Dorado, off the coast of Cuba. When no further cause of friction between the two countries developed, San Jacinto returned home and decommissioned at New York on 21 June 1855 for repairs.

== East Indian Squadron, 1855–1859 ==
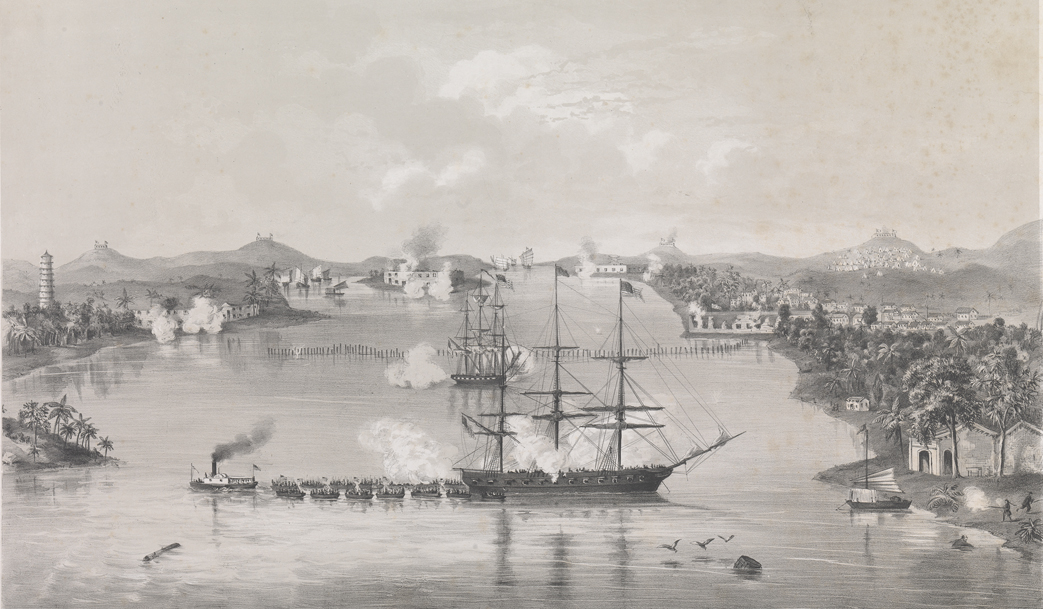
Attack on the Barrier Forts on November 21, showing Portsmouth, and Levant, with men and officers from the San Jacinto

Recommissioned on 4 October 1855, the screw frigate, now commanded by Captain Henry H. Bell, departed New York on the 25th and headed for the Far East as flagship of Commodore James Armstrong. After proceeding via Madeira, the Cape of Good Hope, Mauritius, and Ceylon, the ship arrived at Penang in the Straits of Malacca on 22 March 1856.

There, Townsend Harris, the recently appointed Consul General to Japan, embarked on 2 April; and the ship got underway that morning for Siam. After a four-day stop at Singapore, where Commodore Armstrong relieved Commodore Joel Abbot in command of the East India Squadron, the frigate reached the bar off the mouth of the Me Nam (later the Chao Phraya) River on the 13th. A few days later, Harris ascended the Me Nam to Bangkok where he negotiated a treaty establishing diplomatic and commercial relations between the United States and Siam. The King of Siam at the time was Mongkut, who was later the subject of the musical comedy, The King and I.

After succeeding in this delicate diplomatic mission, Harris returned on the morning of 1 June to San Jacinto, which awaited him at the mouth of the Me Nam; and the frigate departed Siam to carry Harris to his new post in Japan.

However, after only half an hour of steaming, engine trouble reappeared and plagued the ship throughout her painfully slow passage to Hong Kong, which she finally reached on the 13th. There, major repairs interrupted the voyage for almost two months.

San Jacinto finally got underway again on 12 August. While proceeding by the Pescadores toward Formosa, she assisted several junks recently disabled by a violent typhoon which had devastated much of the coast of China. The ship at long last reached Shimoda, Japan, on 21 August and remained there while Harris was negotiating with Japanese officials concerning the establishment of his consulate—the first official foreign diplomatic office to be permitted on Japanese soil. During his subsequent service as Consul General, Harris persuaded the Japanese government to sign a commercial treaty which opened the country to American trade and hastened the westernization and industrial development of Japan.

On 4 September 1856, after a party from the ship had erected a flagpole in front of the new consulate and had helped Harris to raise the Stars and Stripes there for the first time, San Jacinto weighed anchor and headed for Shanghai.

Early in October 1856, mounting hostility toward foreigners in China erupted into the Second Opium War. Later that month, word of the fighting between British and Chinese forces at Canton reached Commodore Armstrong at Shanghai, and he proceeded in San Jacinto to the scene of the conflict. When he reached the Pearl River, he learned that Comdr. Andrew H. Foote, in response to a request for help from the United States consul at Canton, had landed a force of 150 men at Whampoa to protect American lives and property.

Armstrong approved of Foote's action and reinforced the shore party with a detachment from San Jacinto. A few days later, after receiving assurances from Chinese officials, the Commodore decided to withdraw the American force.

However, on 15 November, while Foote was passing the barrier forts in a small boat during preparations for reembarkation, Chinese guns fired upon him four or five times. The next day, Portsmouth closed the nearest fort and opened fire, beginning a vigorous engagement which continued until the Chinese batteries were silenced some two hours later. Meanwhile, efforts were begun to settle the matter by diplomatic means. Nevertheless, four days later, after receiving a report that the Chinese were strengthening their works, Armstrong again ordered his ships to open fire. They bombarded the two nearest forts until the enemy fire slackened. Then Foote led about 300 men ashore, took the first fort, and used the 53 guns captured there to silence hostile batteries in the next fort. The bluejackets and marines ashore subsequently beat off an attack by 3,000 Chinese soldiers from Canton. In the following two days, they first silenced and then took the three remaining forts. In all, they seized and spiked 176 cannon. Before the American ships departed Canton, their men had destroyed these riverside strongholds. During the fighting, negotiations with Chinese officials continued and resulted in the recognition of the rights of the United States as a neutral power.

Thereafter, San Jacinto served in Chinese ports for more than a year, principally at Hong Kong and Shanghai. After protecting American interests in the troubled waters of the Far East into 1858, the veteran steam frigate returned home on 4 August and decommissioned two days later.

== African Squadron, 1859–1861 ==
Over ten months in ordinary followed before San Jacinto was recommissioned on 6 July 1859, for service in the Africa Squadron to help suppress the slave trade. The following spring, 1860, she proceeded to Cádiz, Spain, for repairs. After returning to the west coast of Africa, she captured the brig, Storm King, on 8 August 1860, 200 miles off the mouth of the Congo River. A prize crew led by Lieutenant A. K. Hughes from the steam frigate sailed the captured slaver to Monrovia and turned 619 freed people (160 men, 130 women, 261 boys and 68 girls) over to Rev. John Seys, the United States agent there, before proceeding to Norfolk with the prize.

== American Civil War, 1861–1865 ==
=== 1861 ===
On 27 August 1861, shortly before San Jacinto sailed for home, Capt. Charles Wilkes assumed command of the ship. En route back to the United States for service in the Union Navy during the American Civil War, the warship searched for the Confederate cruiser, Sumter, which, under Capt. Raphael Semmes, CSN, was then preying upon Union shipping in the Atlantic. She visited the Windward Passage, Jamaica, Grand Cayman, and Boca Grande, Florida while seeking the Southern commerce raider. When the ship touched at Cienfuegos, Cuba, for coal, Wilkes learned that James M. Mason and John Slidell, former United States senators and new Confederate envoys to Britain and France, had escaped from Charleston, South Carolina, on 12 October in the speedy coastal packet, Theodora, and were at Havana awaiting transportation to Europe.

Wilkes raced around the island to Havana, bent on intercepting Theodora on the blockade runner's return trip but arrived on the last day of the month, one day after his quarry had departed.

However, he learned that the Southern diplomats were still at Havana and intended to sail for St. Thomas a week later in the British mail packet, Trent. They planned to board a British liner there to complete their journey to London.

Wilkes proceeded in San Jacinto to a narrow part of the Old Bahama Channel, some 230 miles east of Havana, and waited there to waylay Trent. On 8 November, two shots across the mail packet's bow made her master heave to. A boarding party from San Jacinto seized the Confederate diplomats and their secretaries and then permitted the packet to resume her voyage. A week later, when San Jacinto reached Norfolk with the prisoners, the exultant North hailed the news as a great Union triumph. The incident strained United States relations with Britain almost to the breaking point and came to be known as the Trent Affair.

Secretary of the Navy Gideon Welles ordered Wilkes to take the prisoners to Boston, Massachusetts in the San Jacinto. The Harbor Pilot, Captain Abel F. Hayden, anchored the San Jacinto in the Boston channel. They were held at Fort Warren until quietly released on New Year's Day, 1862, and taken to Provincetown, Massachusetts, to board HMS Rinaldo for passage to London. The diplomatic crisis then subsided.

=== 1862 ===
San Jacinto was decommissioned on 30 November 1861 for overhaul at the Boston Navy Yard and was prepared for service as flagship of the Gulf Blockading Squadron. Recommissioned on 1 March 1862, commanded by William Ronckendorff, the steamer departed Boston for Hampton Roads on the ninth, the day of the epic battle between USS Monitor and CSS Virginia, the former Merrimack. San Jacinto reached the Virginia Capes on the 15th and remained in the area temporarily assigned to the North Atlantic Blockading Squadron to bolster Union naval forces in Hampton Roads lest Virginia return to that strategic waterway and threaten General George McClellan's army which was then pushing up the peninsula between the James and York rivers toward Richmond, Virginia.

On 11 April 1862, Virginia rounded Sewell's Point and entered Hampton Roads. Under the ironclad's protection, CSS Jamestown and CSS Raleigh approached the Hampton shore and captured three small Union Army transports. No major engagement developed and the Confederate ships retired upstream late in the afternoon.

On 5 May, President Abraham Lincoln arrived in Hampton Roads on board the steamer, Miami, to take personal charge of the stalled Peninsula Campaign; and, for the next five days, acted as Commander in Chief in the field. At his orders three days later, San Jacinto joined other Union warships in bombarding Sewell's Point.

Events moved fast thereafter. Confederate troops withdrew from Norfolk and Suffolk, Virginia and set fire to the Navy Yard at Portsmouth, Virginia. San Jacinto helped to provide naval support as U.S. troops occupied the evacuated area. In the early hours of 11 May, Virginia's crew set the dreaded Southern ironclad ablaze and she blew up before dawn.

With the end of the principal Confederate naval threat to Union forces on the peninsula and its surrounding water, San Jacinto was free to resume her voyage south. She departed Hampton Roads on the 23rd, carrying Flag Officer James L. Lardner, and reached Key West, Florida, on 1 June. Three days later, Lardner relieved Flag Officer William McKean in command of the East Gulf Blockading Squadron, and San Jacinto became the squadron flagship.

The ship's tour of duty as flagship was cut short. On 1 August, Lardner reported that yellow fever had broken out on the ship; and, the next day, she sailed north. She arrived at the quarantine area off Deer Island, near Boston, on the ninth.

The health of her crew restored, San Jacinto was assigned to the North Atlantic Blockading Squadron, departed Boston on 15 October and, four days later, joined the blockade off Wilmington, North Carolina. As she was taking station in the blockade, orders from Washington directed the ship to proceed immediately to Hampton Roads, fill her bunkers with coal, and steam at top speed to the coast of Nova Scotia in search of the Confederate cruiser, Alabama, with which the elusive Raphael Semmes had struck a series of rapid blows against American shipping and fishing and caused Northern merchants to clamor for protection.

San Jacinto got under way on the 22nd and reached Hampton Roads on the morning of the 24th. While she was preparing for sea, reports reached Washington indicating that Alabama might have altered her course. Accordingly, when San Jacinto sailed on the morning of the 26th, she headed via Bermuda to the West Indies. In the weeks that followed, the frigate and Alabama played hide-and-seek in the Caribbean. On the morning of 19 November, the Federal warship finally caught up with Semmes when she reached Fort Royal, Martinique. Alabama had anchored there the previous morning and was enjoying sanctuary in the neutral port. San Jacinto waited at the entrance to the harbor just outside the three-mile limit required by international law, but Alabama slipped by her to comparative safety at sea during the ensuing dark and rainy night. As neither ship saw the other during the escape, San Jacinto remained at Fort Royal until certain that Alabama was not hiding in some secluded spot within the bay, but had indeed escaped. On the 21st, San Jacinto got under way and searched for her slippery adversary until arriving at Key West on 15 January 1863.

=== 1863 ===
There she was attached to the East Gulf Blockading Squadron as flagship. However, soon after she began this duty, word reached Key West that CSS Florida had escaped through the blockade from Mobile and was at Havana. On 22 January, Rear Admiral Theodorus Bailey ordered San Jacinto to sail for Cuba and blockade the Confederate cruiser if she were in port or to chase and capture or destroy her if the commerce raider had departed. The Union frigate quickly put to sea but found little trace of Florida. She broke her shaft on 30 January; sailed north on 4 February; and reached the New York Navy Yard on the 16th for repairs.

Again ready for action, San Jacinto departed New York on 24 June and returned to Key West on 1 July. She celebrated Independence Day by becoming Rear Admiral Bailey's flagship, and she performed that duty until relieved by USS Dale on 5 September.

The ship then took up blockade duty off Mobile, Alabama. On the afternoon of the 11th, her masthead lookout reported "black smoke bearing about south", and San Jacinto set out in pursuit of the steamer. During the chase, the lookout spotted the blockade runner Fox, aground and burning. About dusk, San Jacinto changed course for Mobile, hoping to intercept the fleeing vessel if she attempted to dash into that port. This strategy proved sound for, early the next morning, the Union steam frigate found that her quarry was again within sight; and the chase began again. Near the Chandeleur Islands, San Jacinto anchored in shoal water and sent her first cutter after the steamer. That evening shortly before twilight, the blockade runner—which happened to bear the name of the frigate's old adversary, Alabama—ran ashore and was abandoned. Before San Jacinto's cutter could reach the prize, the Union blockader Eugenie arrived upon the scene and took possession of the blockade runner.

On the 16th, San Jacinto captured the steamer Lizzie Davis after a two-hour chase. This blockade runner had departed from Havana laden with lead and was endeavoring to dash into Mobile. On 6 October, San Jacinto was within signal distance when the schooner USS Beauregard took possession of Last Trial, after heavy weather had forced that Southern sloop to seek shelter near Key West. On 16 December, USS Ariel, a tender to San Jacinto, captured the Confederate sloop Magnolia; and, on the 24th, the schooner USS Fox, another of San Jacinto's tenders, took the British schooner Edward, which was trying to carry salt and lead from Havana to the Suwannee River, notwithstanding Britain's de jure neutrality.

=== 1864 ===
On the morning of 7 January 1864, San Jacinto overtook the schooner Roebuck after a two-hour chase, and deprived the Confederacy of a general cargo including much clothing and lead. In another two-hour chase on 11 March, San Jacinto ran an unnamed schooner (formerly called Lealtad) aground. She then took possession of this prize which was laden with cotton and turpentine for export.

Yellow fever again struck the veteran warship the following summer; and San Jacinto—carrying Rear Admiral Bailey, now dangerously ill with the disease—departed Key West on 7 August and sailed north hoping for a quick restoration of the crew to good health. She reached the quarantine area at New York Harbor on the 13th; but, the next day was ordered to fill up with coal and set out in pursuit of the Confederate cruiser Tallahassee. The ship sailed on the 19th and raced as far north as Halifax, Nova Scotia, without finding the Southern commerce raider.

After the ship put in at Portsmouth, New Hampshire, she received long-overdue repairs. She returned to Key West on 3 December and resumed her role as squadron flagship a week later. Toward the end of the month, she was relieved of this duty and sailed for the Bahamas.

=== 1865 ===
On New Year's Day, 1865, the ship struck a reef near Great Abaco Island and filled with water. Her guns, along with some equipment and provisions, were saved; but efforts to salvage the ship were unsuccessful. The ship's hulk was sold at Nassau, New Providence, on 17 May 1871.

=== Prizes ===
Date	Prize Name	Gross Proceeds	Costs and Expenses	Amount for Distribution	Where Adjudicated	Sent to 4th Auditor for Distribution	Vessels Entitled to Share
7 Aug 1863	Buckshot	$1,918	$295	$1,623	Key West	29 Mar 1864	San Jacinto
16 Sept 1863	Lizzie Davis	$18,351	$2441	$15,910	New Orleans	7 Jun 1864	San Jacinto
7 Jan 1864	Roebuck	$9,071	$975	$8,096	Key West	1 May 1865	San Jacinto
11 Mar 1864	Lealtad or Leartad	$43,261	$4,381	$38,881	Key West	22 Mar 1865	San Jacinto

== See also ==
- Confederate States Navy
- Union Navy
