= Oliver S. Glisson =

Oliver Spencer Glisson
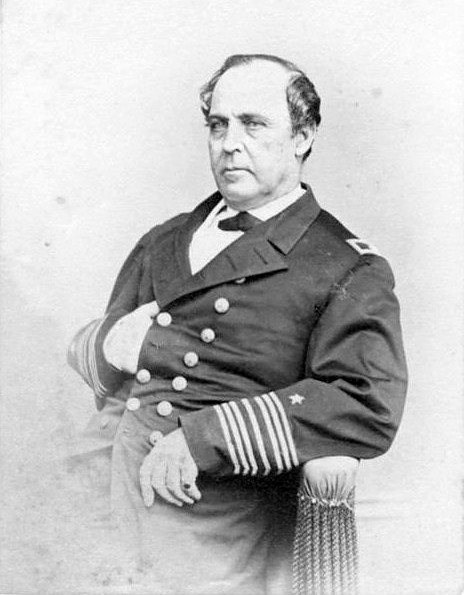
- Circa 1868–1870 by Frederick Gutekunst
- Born: January 18, 1809; Mount Pleasant, Ohio
- Died: November 20, 1890 (aged 81); Philadelphia, Pennsylvania
- Burial place: The Woodlands Cemetery
- Military career
- Allegiance: United States of America
- Branch: United States Navy
- Service years: 1826–1871
- Rank: Rear admiral
- Commands: USS Reefer USS Powhatan; USS John P. Kennedy; USS Ice Boat; USS Mount Vernon; USS Iroquois; USS Mohican; USS Santiago de Cuba European Squadron
- Conflicts: Mexican–American War; American Civil War

Oliver Spencer Glisson (January 18, 1809 – November 20, 1890), was a rear admiral of the United States Navy. After commanding a schooner in the Mexican–American War, he was posted to the East India Squadron and took part in the Japan Expedition when the first treaty with the Japanese was signed by Commodore Matthew Perry in 1853. Throughout the American Civil War, Glisson served in the North Atlantic Blockading Squadron, intercepting illegal trade across the Potomac, and patrolling the mouth of the Rappahannock. Early in the war, Glisson rescued a group of slaves who were being used by the Confederates as a human shield. Although this rescue contravened the Fugitive Slave Act, it was authorised by Secretary of the Navy Gideon Welles on humanitarian grounds.

== Childhood ==
Glisson was born to Thomas Glisson [March 8, 1783 – October 17, 1849 (aged 66)] and Rebecca Runyan Glisson [April 24, 1785 – October 21, 1843 (aged 58)] near Mount Pleasant, Ohio, (Mount Healthy since 1850) in Hamilton County, the second of ten children.

The family relocated to a farm east of Brookville, Indiana, in neighboring Franklin county around 1817. To attend school, Glisson lived at the Brookville home of Dr. David Oliver. After Glisson entered the U.S. Navy, his family moved back to Hamilton County on a farm located in Colerain Township around 1828.

== Naval career (1826–1844) ==
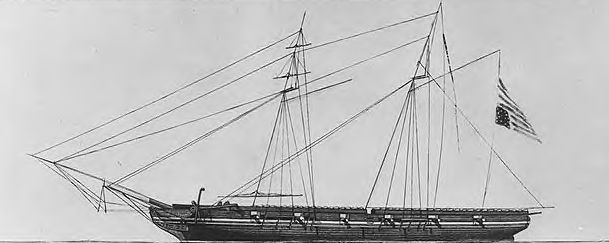
USS Grampus

Glisson was recruited from Indiana as a midshipman on November 1, 1826. Among his sponsors were Senator James Noble, Governor James Ray, Judge John Test and Indiana Supreme Court Judge John T. McKinney.

Glisson's first cruise was aboard the corvette USS John Adams in the West Indies Squadron during 1827–28. He transferred within the squadron to the sloop-of-war USS Falmouth 1829–30 and then the schooner USS Grampus 1831–32.

Promoted to passed midshipman on June 4, 1832, Glisson was assigned to the Mediterranean Squadron 1832–35 aboard the ship of the line USS Delaware. Launching from Hampton Roads on July 30, 1833, the first port of call was New York Harbor to pick up Edward Livingston, minister plenipotentiary to France. After landing Livingston at Cherbourg Harbour, the ship proceeded to the Mediterranean Sea. Two crew members published a book detailing the ports which the ship called until their arrival at Port Mahon on October 9, 1835.

In 1836 while performing land duty in the Norfolk Navy Yard, Glisson married Pamela Parker and took up residence. On February 9, 1837, he was promoted to lieutenant and served as a recruiter during the Norfolk Rendezvous 1837–38.

Glisson was sent to the Brazil Squadron aboard the sloop-of-war USS Fairfield 1839–42. Returned to the West India Squadron, he sailed on the sloop-of-war USS Marion 1843–44.

The sloop-of-war USS Saratoga carried him during patrol of the South American coast for another tour in the Brazil Squadron 1845–46.

== Naval career (1845–1860) ==
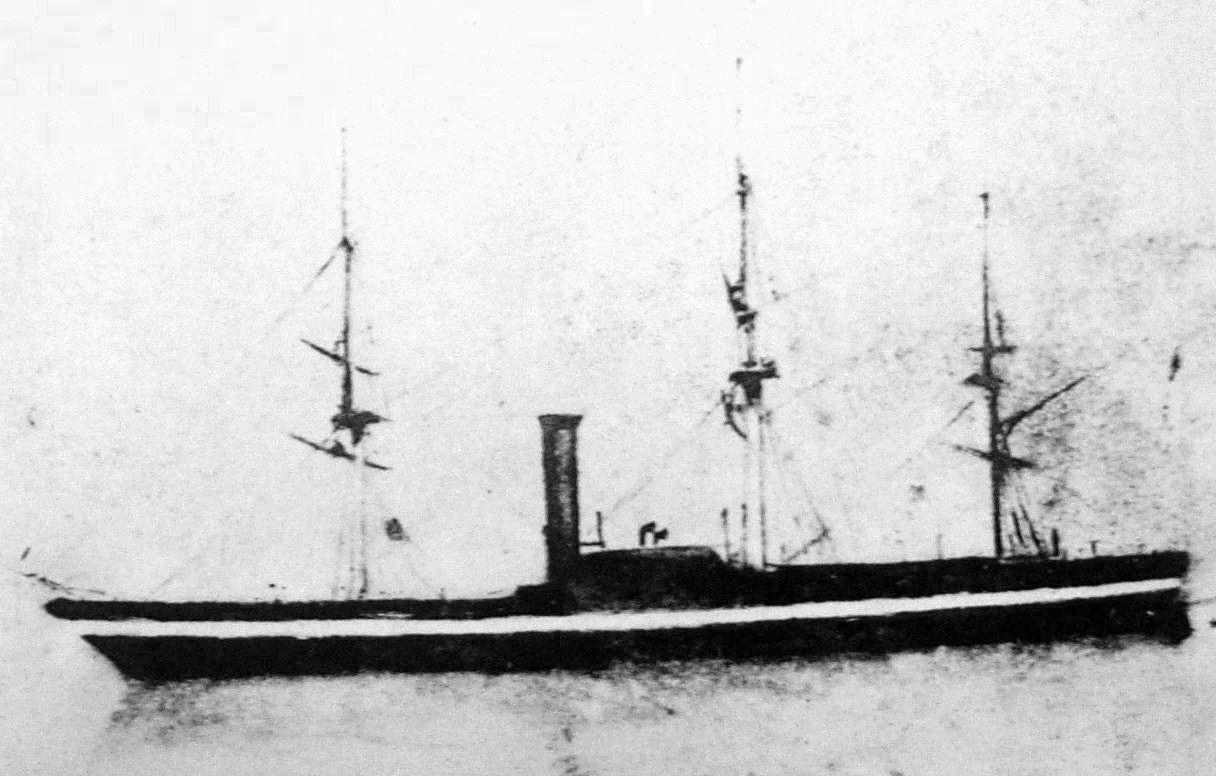
USS Powhatan

During the Mexican–American War he was given his first command, the pilot schooner USS Reefer in the Home Squadron. For the duration of the war, Glisson sailed the Gulf of Mexico off Mexico's east coast. At the end of naval fighting in June 1847, Reefer and her sister ships settled down to blockade duty and maintained both water lines of supply and communication for the Army.

After the war from 1848 through 1850, he served in the Norfolk Navy Yard again and then was granted permission to take special duty between 1851 and 1852.

Glisson was attached to the steam frigate USS Powhatan in 1853 for a tour with the East India Squadron. Until 1855, he participated in the Japan Expedition and was in Japan when the first treaty was signed by Commodore Matthew Perry. Promoted to commander on September 14, 1855, he remained with the East India Squadron commanding the store ship USS John P. Kennedy through 1856.

Returning to the United States for land assignment, Glisson spent 1857–60 based at the Philadelphia Naval Asylum.

== Naval Career (1861–1865) ==
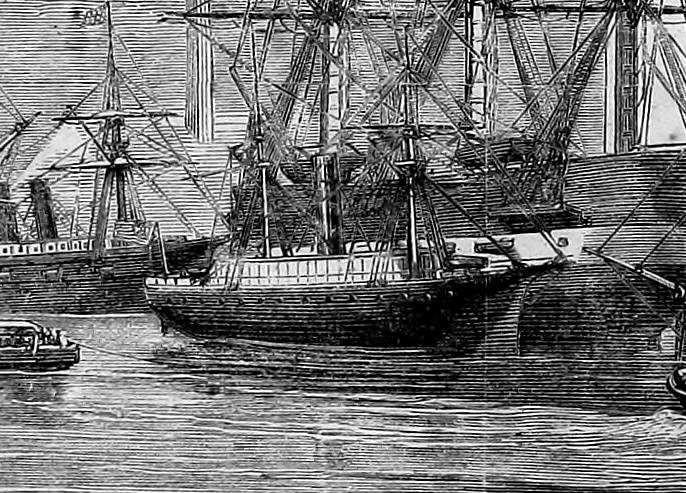
USS Mount Vernon

At the commencement of the American Civil War, Glisson was assigned to the Coast Blockading Squadron which was then renamed the Atlantic Blockading Squadron before ending up with then split North Atlantic Blockading Squadron in which he remained until the close of the war. On April 23, 1861, he took charge of the borrowed USS Ice Boat, monitoring the Aquia Creek vicinity to intercept trade across the Potomac River between Virginia and Maryland. Next, Glisson received command of the steamer USS Mount Vernon to patrol the Atlantic coast in and off the Rappahannock River.

On July 15, 1861, Glisson rescued six refugee slaves found hiding on Stingray Point Light. The slaves had escaped the Confederate Army which was forcing them to the front as human shields during battles. Glisson requested authorization from Silas Stringham, the commander of the Atlantic Blocking Squadron, who in turn relayed the request to Secretary of the Navy Gideon Welles. Even before Stringham wrote Welles, Glisson reported on July 17 he had picked up three more slaves, claiming they would be killed if they were returned. Welles responded July 22 "It is not the policy of the Government to invite or encourage this class of desertions, and yet, under the circumstances, no other course than that pursued by Commander Glisson could be adopted without violating every principle of humanity."

Under the cover of night on December 31, 1861, Glisson approached an unmanned light-boat, which had previously been stationed as a beacon off of Frying Pan Shoals. It was anchored under the guns of Fort Caswell to be outfitted with armaments for its new function to defend the fort. A detachment of volunteers from the crew set the light-boat afire and suffered no casualties despite heavy gunfire from the fort during their withdrawal.

The transport USS Mississippi, which was bound for the offensive to capture New Orleans with General Benjamin Butler's expedition of 1,500 men, was run up onto the Frying Pan Shoals the morning of February 26, 1862. Dropping achor confirmed the Mississippi, with a draft of 18 feet (5.5 m), was in 14 feet (4.3 m) of water. Meanwhile, the ship forged onto a fluke of the anchor punching a hole through the hull about 5 inches (0.13 m) square. Although the sea was calm and the fore compartment was sealed, danger of break up or capsize was imminent. It would have taken days to land the troops using the ship's boats and the shore was hostile territory. Glisson, in the Mount Vernon, happened upon the ship and began rescue operations by tying off a hawser to pull the ship free. 300 troops were offloaded onto the Mount Vernon, munitions and food were thrown overboard, pumps were manned, the engines worked at full speed and troops ran back and forth between stern and bow to rock the boat free. But the Mississippi remained fast until just after sundown as the high tide finally lifted the ship enough to pull free, preventing a catastrophe and allowing the Mississippi to resume its course after repairs to the hull.

Glisson took command of steam sloops of war, the USS Iroquois in the West Gulf Blockading Squadron and then the USS Mohican from the latter part of 1862 through 1864. He was promoted to captain December 26, 1862. The Mohican, stationed at the Cape de Verde Islands for six months, took part in the chase of the CSS Alabama. Relocating to Bahia, Glisson learned they had just missed the Alabama by twenty–four hours. While at the island of Fernando de Noronha Glisson saved the crew of a French vessel, for which he received the thanks of the French government.

Glisson helmed the steamer USS Santiago de Cuba from 1864 through 1865. His actions in the first and second attacks on Fort Fisher earned him a promotion recommendation from Admiral David Porter.

== Naval career (1866–1871) ==
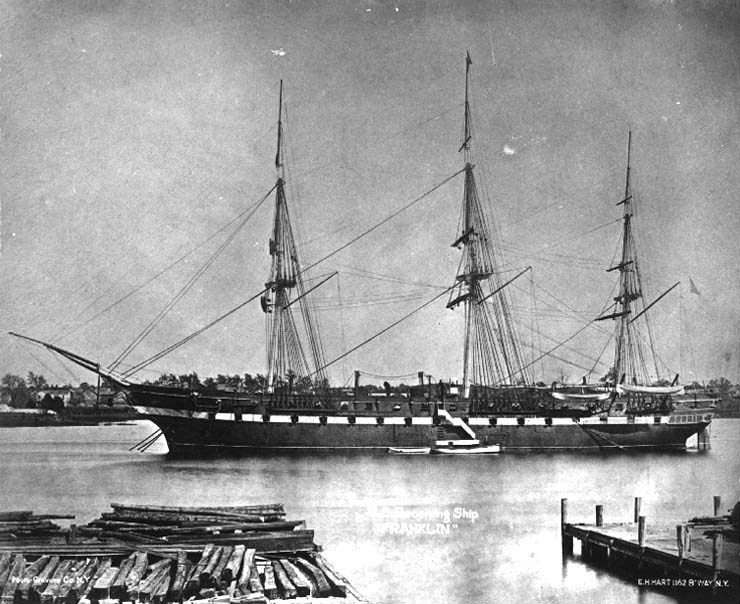
USS Franklin circa 1880

On July 25, 1866, Glisson was commissioned as commodore and oversaw the station at League Island, Philadelphia from 1867 to 1869. He was appointed rear admiral June 10, 1870 and ordered to the command of the European Squadron just as the Franco-Prussian War had commenced.

Arriving at Flushing, Netherlands with his wife, Glisson relieved his predecessor, Rear Admiral William Radford and hoisted his pennant above his flagship, the steam frigate USS Franklin. From Flushing, the Franklin was compelled to sail to Portsmouth, England, for repairs upon her propeller.

After repairs were completed, the Franklin set course to Lisbon, Portugal for coal. While there, Glisson was asked to participate in the wedding of Charles Allen Perkins, attaché for the American Legation. The bride was the Princess Dona Maria Isabella Francoise de Bourbon, granddaughter of King Charles IV of Spain and exiled in Portugal. Glisson escorted the bride and gave her away instead of her father, diplomat Ignacio Gurowski, who was unable to attend. The wedding was performed twice: once in the Church of St. Louis of the French and again on board the Franklin.

Leaving Lisbon, the Franklin next dropped anchor in Naples, Italy and then at Nice, France. After slightly over seven months in Europe, Glisson was placed on the retired list January 18, 1871 as he approached the mandatory age of 62. He relinquished squadron command to Rear Admiral Charles S. Boggs and returned with his wife to the United States.

== Marriage and family ==
Glisson married Pamela A. Parker [c. 1816 – June 5, 1890 (aged 73)] in Norfolk, Virginia April 24, 1835. She was the daughter of Copeland Parker [1777 – 1830 (aged 50)] and his second wife Diana Robinson Hall [1780 – 1856 (aged 75)]. The Glissons had four sons.

After the Civil War, Glisson moved his family to 1630 Chestnut Street, Philadelphia, Pennsylvania. He spent the rest of his life there with a vacation home in Long Branch, New Jersey.

== Legacy ==
The biography To the Loving Memory of Rear Admiral Oliver S. Glisson, U.S.N. was published by Glisson's sons, Oliver Jr. and Jacob, in 1891. Most of the 146 page book is devoted to Glisson's Civil War engagements via contemporary first-hand newspaper accounts written by A.F. and C.C. Fulton, editors and proprietors of the Baltimore American.

Glisson House at 405 Duke Street, Norfolk, Virginia is a Greek Revival home that Glisson had built circa 1840. The three-story home is located in the West Freemason Street Historic District and Hunter House Victorian Museum includes the house in its walking and guided tours.

In 1850, Glisson retained attorney Thomas S. Yeatman to map plats on the farm of his recently deceased father, Thomas Glisson. Glisson Subdivision is situated south of the village of Dunlap, Ohio which had formed in 1849.

A storm near Smithfield, Virginia, in 1884 caused the roof of the Old Brick Church to fall, collapsing a portion of the eastern wall also. Glisson contributed to the restoration effort, sponsoring the pulpit and sounding board. The relatives of Glisson's wife Pamela dwelt in the Smithfield area and the donation was made in her name.
