= Gilbert Dean =

American judge

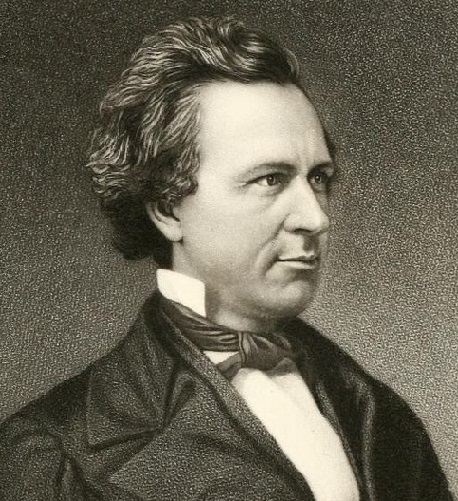

New York State Assembly (New York Co., 15th D.)
- In office 1863

Justice of the New York Supreme Court
- In office 1854–1855

Member of the U.S. House of Representatives from New York
- In office March 4, 1851 – July 3, 1854
- Preceded by: Ransom Halloway
- Succeeded by: Isaac Teller
- Constituency: 8th district (1851–53); 12th district (1853–54)

Personal details
- Born: August 14, 1819 Pleasant Valley, New York, U.S.
- Died: October 12, 1870 (aged 51) Poughkeepsie, New York, U.S.
- Resting place: Portland Evergreen Cemetery in Brocton, New York
- Party: Democratic
- Education: Yale College

Gilbert Dean (August 14, 1819 – October 12, 1870) was an American lawyer, jurist and politician who served as a Democratic U.S. representative from New York from 1851 to 1854.

== Life ==
Dean was born on August 14, 1819, in Pleasant Valley, Dutchess County, New York. He was educated at Amenia Seminary, and graduated from Yale College in 1841. Then he studied law, was admitted to the bar, and commenced practice in Poughkeepsie in 1844.

=== Congress ===
Dean was elected as a Democrat to the 32nd and 33rd United States Congresses, and served two terms from March 4, 1851, to July 3, 1854, when he resigned.

=== Judge ===
He was appointed a justice of the New York Supreme Court (2nd District) on June 26, 1854, to fill the vacancy caused by the death of Seward Barculo, and remained on the bench until the end of 1855, being ex officio a judge of the New York Court of Appeals in 1855. Afterwards he removed to New York City, and resumed the practice of law.

=== State assembly ===
He was a member of the New York State Assembly (New York Co., 15th D.) in 1863, and was the Democratic candidate for Speaker in the tied assembly. Dean and the Republican candidate Henry Sherwood retired after the 78th ballot, and Theophilus C. Callicot was elected Speaker on the 92nd ballot.

== Death and burial ==
He died on October 12, 1870, in Poughkeepsie, New York. He was buried at the Presbyterian Cemetery in Pleasant Valley. Later he was re-interred at the Portland Evergreen Cemetery in Brocton, New York.

U.S. House of Representatives
Preceded by Ransom Halloway	Member of the U.S. House of Representatives from New York's 8th congressional district 1851–1853	Succeeded by Francis B. Cutting
Preceded by David L. Seymour	Member of the U.S. House of Representatives from New York's 12th congressional district 1853–1854	Succeeded by Isaac Teller
New York State Assembly
Preceded by David S. Coddington	New York State Assembly; New York County, 15th District; 1863	Succeeded by Stephen R. Pinckney
