= Thomas Fielder Bowie =

American politician (1808–1869)

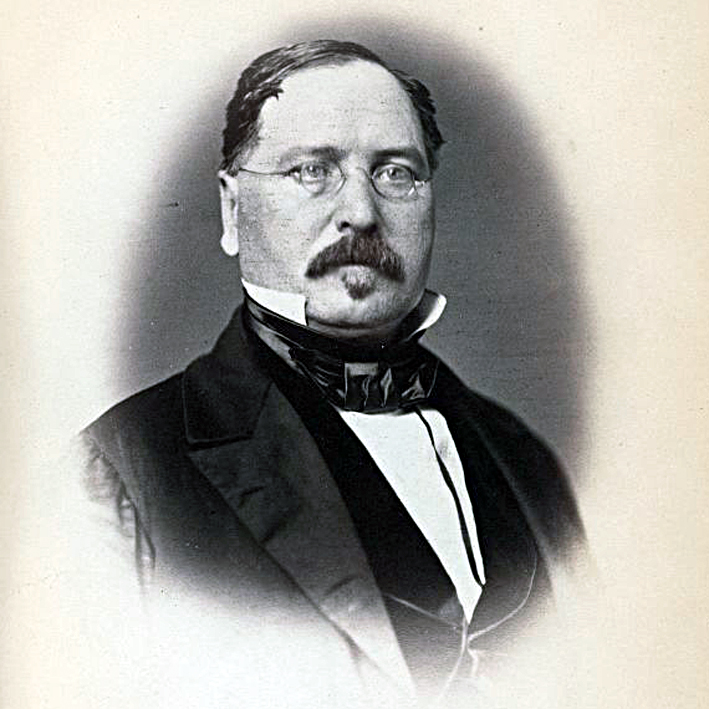

Member of the U.S. House of Representatives from Maryland's 6th district
- In office March 4, 1855 – March 3, 1859
- Preceded by: Augustus Rhodes Sollers
- Succeeded by: George Wurtz Hughes

Member of the Maryland House of Delegates
- In office 1837–1839, 1842–1846

Personal details
- Born: April 7, 1808 Queen Anne, Maryland, U.S.
- Died: October 30, 1869 (aged 61) Upper Marlboro, Maryland, U.S.
- Resting place: Mount Pleasant
- Party: Whig Independent; Democratic Anti-Know Nothing
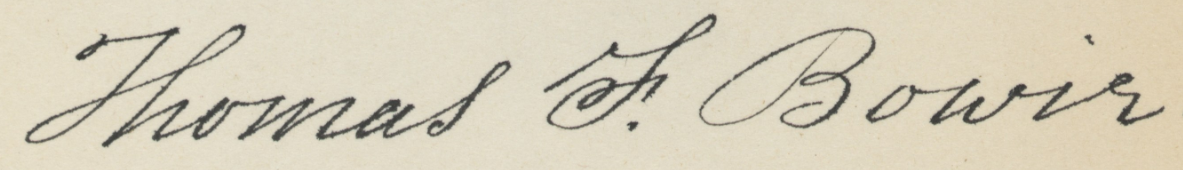
- Signature

Thomas Fielder Bowie (April 7, 1808 – October 30, 1869) was an American politician, lawyer, and tobacco planter. He represented Maryland in the United States House of Representatives from 1855 to 1859. He also served in the Maryland House of Delegates.

== Early life ==
Bowie was born on April 7, 1808 at Essington in Queen Anne, in Prince George's County, Maryland. His parents were Mary (née Wooton) and Thomas Contee Bowie.

He attended Charlotte Hall Military Academy in St. Mary's County, Maryland, and Princeton College. He graduated from Union College in Schenectady, New York in 1827. While at Union College, Bowie helped found the Sigma Phi fraternity on March 4, 1827.

Bowie studied law with Reverdy Johnson, his brother-in-law. He was admitted to the bar in Upper Marlboro, Maryland, in 1829.

== Career ==
Bowie was a planter, horse breeder, and lawyer in Upper Marlboro, Maryland. In April 1829, he advertised as an attorney and counsellor of law, practicing in Prince George's County Courts, the Court of Appeals, and the High Court of Chancery. In August 1841, he was appointed a state deputy attorney general for Prince George's County. He was the deputy attorney general for Prince George's County from 1833 to 1842.

In July 1833, Bowie was a delegate and the secretary of the Republican Party convention for Prince George's County. In July 1835, he was elected chair of the county's Whig Party. In January 1837, he was elected secretary of the Convention of the Planters and Growers of Tobacco of the U.S. in Washington, D.C., and was also the secretary of the Prince George's Agricultural Society in 1843 and president in 1851.

Bowie was secretary of the Prince George's County Whig Party in 1841. He was elected to the Maryland House of Delegates, representing Prince George's County as a Whig from 1837 to 1839 and 1842 to 1846. He was an unsuccessful candidate for Governor of Maryland in 1843.

In July 1848, Bowie switched to the Independent Taylor Party, supporting Zachary Taylor and Millard Fillmore. Bowie served as a member of the Maryland Constitutional Reform Convention in 1850; he was chair of the committee on the judiciary department in 1851. He was an unsuccessful Independent candidate to the United States House of Representatives in 1851, after stepping down from his nomination as the Whig candidate. He was also a presidential elector on the Whig ticket in 1852.

Bowie was elected from Maryland's 6th congressional district as a Democrat to the United States House of Representatives for the 34th United States Congress, with a term starting on March 4, 1855. He was reelected to the 35th United States Congress as an Anti-Know Nothing Candidate, serving until March 3, 1859. He was an unsuccessful candidate for re-nomination in 1858.

In July 1855, Bowie formed a law firm with Albert Stuart of Alexandria, Virginia, specializing in the nearly formed U.S. Court of Claims. In November 1858, Bowie was a commissioner of the Baltimore and Potomac Railroad. Bowie re-established his Maryland-based law practice in March 1864, in the courts of Maryland, the Supreme Court of the District of Columbia, and the Court of Claims in Washington, D.C. However, he remained politically active, writing essays related to the tobacco tax and labor. In January 1865, he had a failed run for Lieutenant Governor of Maryland. In June 1866, he announced his candidacy for the 5th district of the United States Congress. Although a Democrat and supporter of President Andrew Johnson at the time, he ran as an independent. In October 1867, Bowie announced his candidacy for the Maryland District Attorney as a Democrat. Later that month, he announced that he was running for the Maryland Legislature to support the state's system of free schools.

== Personal life ==
Bowie married Catherine Harrison Waring on November 18, 1830. She was the daughter of Col. Henry Waring of Mount Pleasant in Prince George's County, Maryland. Their children were Henry Waring Bowie, Henry Waring Bowie, Thomas Waring Bowie, Thomas Fielder Bowie Jr., Sarah Louise Bowie, Henry Contee Bowie, Mary Mackall Bowie, Ellen Waring Bowie, and Edith Plantagenet Bowie. After Catherine died in June 1849, Bowie married Virginia Griffith on July 24, 1855. Their children were Edward Griffith Bowie, Alexander Bowie, and Robert Bruce Bowie. Bowie was a slave owner.

In April 1831, Bowie was elected to the board of managers of the Maryland State Temperance Society. He was a commissioner of the Upper Marlborough Ball Society in 1936.

Governor Enoch Louis Lowe appointed Bowie the brigadier general of the 4th brigade, 1st division of the Maryland State Militia in February 1851. During the American Civil War, Federal authorities arrested Bowie and imprisoned him in Washington, D.C. in July 1862 for suspicion of encouraging soldiers to desert. Bowie's position on the war was that he owed allegiance to both the state of Maryland and the Federal government, and had done nothing to harm either. He was honorably paroled on August 8, 1862, after agreeing to not aid the Confederacy. However, in a speech made to the Democratic Association in Baltimore, Maryland, in July 1868, Bowie made it clear that he sided with the Confederacy, noting that the war "began with the purest patriotism" and "with the fall of the South fell the Constitution".

In February 1867, Bowie was the successful defendant in a case before the Supreme Court of the United States over the legality of using the courts to collect $3,000 in gambling debts.

After a long illness, Bowie died at his residence in Upper Marlboro, Maryland, on October 30, 1869, at the age of 61. He was buried in the Waring family cemetery at Mount Pleasant, near Upper Marlboro.

U.S. House of Representatives
Preceded by Augustus Rhodes Sollers	Representative of the 6th Congressional District of Maryland; 1855–1859	Succeeded by George Wurtz Hughes
