= Gilbert Deane (priest) =

Irish Anglican priest

Gilbert Deane was an Anglican priest in Ireland during the second half of the seventeenth century.

Deane was born in Jerpoint and educated at Trinity College, Dublin. He was Archdeacon of Ossory from 1636 and Prebendary of Tasagart in St Patrick's Cathedral, Dublin from 1646, holding both positions until his death in 1661.
