= Henry Sherwood (New York politician) =

American politician

Henry Sherwood (January 27, 1824 – July 23, 1875) was an American lawyer and politician from New York.

== Life ==
He was the son of Micajah Sherwood, and was born in that part of the Town of Troupsburg which was separated in 1828 to form the Town of Woodhull, in Steuben County, New York. He studied law with Ferral C. Dininny, was admitted to the bar in 1852, and practiced. In 1855, he married Eleanor Robinson.

He was a member of the New York State Assembly (Steuben Co., 2nd D.) in 1862 and 1863. In 1863, he was the Republican candidate for Speaker of the New York State Assembly, but due to a deadlocked assembly, he withdrew from the contest after the 78th ballot. Eventually, Democrat Theophilus C. Callicot was elected by the Republicans on the 92nd ballot.

Later he was a director of the Erie Railroad.

He died at his home in Corning.

== Sources ==
- The New York Civil List compiled by Franklin Benjamin Hough, Stephen C. Hutchins and Edgar Albert Werner (1870; pg. 497 and 499)
- Biographical Sketches of the State Officers and the Members of the Legislature of the State of New York in 1862 and '63 by William D. Murphy (1863; pg. 399f)
- Obit transcribed from the New York Herald on July 24, 1875
- HON. HENRY SHERWOOD, obit in NYT on July 24, 1875

New York State Assembly
Preceded by Jeffrey Smith	New York State Assembly; Steuben County, 2nd District; 1862–1863	Succeeded by Alexander Olcott
