= Mount Pleasant (Upper Marlboro, Maryland) =

Historic house in Maryland, United States

- U.S. National Register of Historic Places
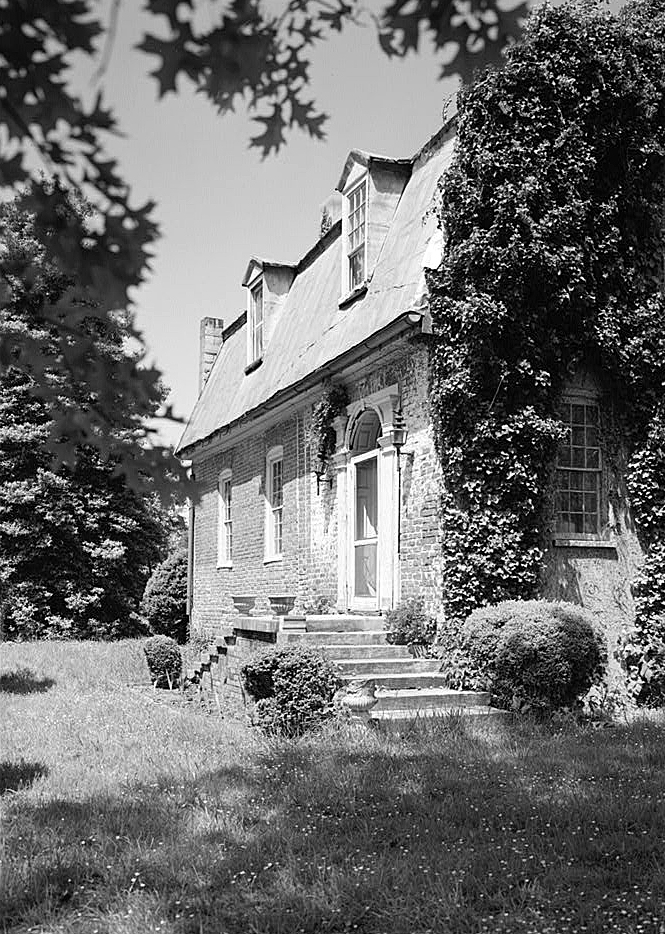

- Location within Maryland Location within the United States
- Location: Mt. Pleasant Rd., Upper Marlboro, Maryland
- Coordinates: 38°50′34″N 76°42′40″W
- Built: 1750
- Architectural style: Georgian
- NRHP reference No.: 72001482
- Added to NRHP: November 29, 1972

Mount Pleasant is 2 1/2-story brick structure with a gambrel roof and is about two-thirds its original length. It is located near Upper Marlboro in Prince George's County, Maryland. Mount Pleasant was patented in 1697 to Richard Marsham, whose wife Anne was the daughter of Leonard Calvert, Governor of Maryland. Their grandson, Marsham Waring, inherited the home from his grandfather in 1713. His son, Richard Marsham Waring had a son, Richard Marsham Jr., born in 1733, who then inherited Mount Pleasant and Patented and Certified the tract of land dubbed "Mount Pleasant Enlarged" in 1760. On August 21, 1764, Richard Marsham Jr. sold the 451 3/4 acre tract of land to his brother John for £474.6s.9d. John later built the standing house in the years between 1764 and 1785 (conflicting dates). John died in 1813 and was buried at Mount Pleasant.

Mount Pleasant is an example of a Maryland style of house—the English gambrel roof dwelling in brick, with a steep gambrel which has dormers almost flush with the second pitch of the roof. This house is noted for its architecture and as a representative example of a more modest type of mid-Georgian dwelling than others in Maryland such as Montpelier, and a closer reflection of the architectural ancestry than the Palladian country house. As a more modest dwelling, Mount Pleasant is an unusual survivor.

Thomas Fielder Bowie is interred in the Waring family burial ground on this site.
