= USS Ice Boat =

Gunboat of the United States Navy

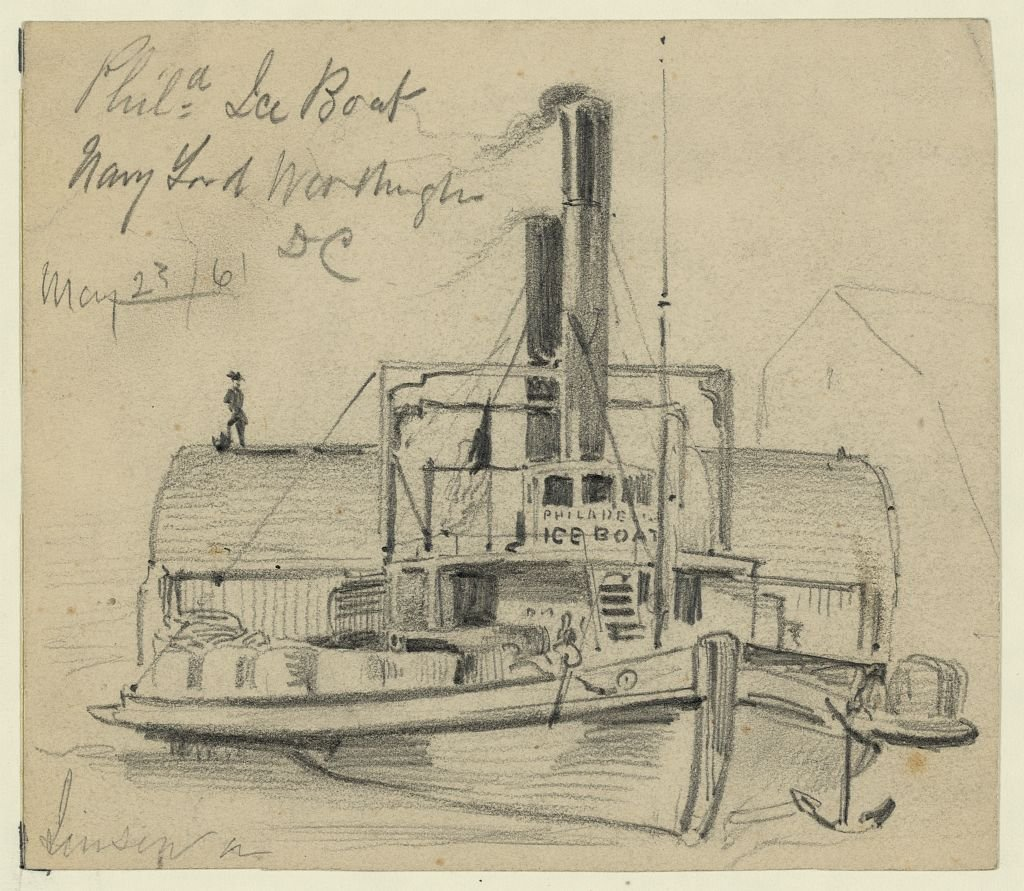
- Docked at the Washington Navy Yard, 23 May 1861

History

United States
- Builder: Van Dusen & Birely (Kensington, PA)
- Completed: 1837
- Acquired: (by USN): 1861
- Commissioned: 23 Apr 1861 – Nov 1861
- In service: 1837–1866
- Refit: —as gunboat, 1861; —as icebreaker, 1861
- Home port: Philadelphia
- Nickname(s): Refrigerator or Release
- Fate: Dismantled 1866

General characteristics
- Length: 170 ft (52 m)
- Beam: 26 ft (7.9 m)
- Depth of hold: 12 ft (3.7 m)
- Installed power: 2 × 200 hp (150 kW) steam engines
- Propulsion: Sidewheels
- Complement: (USN): 50
- Armament: (USN): 4 × 32 pdr (15 kg) gun

USS Ice Boat was a vessel borrowed from the City of Philadelphia, Pennsylvania, by the Union Navy when the American Civil War suddenly broke out. She was placed in service immediately and kept in service until she could be replaced by Union Navy vessels, built or borrowed, and then returned to Philadelphia.

== Service history ==
=== Merchant service, 1837–1861 ===
The City Ice Boat, also known as also known as Refrigerator and Release, was built in Philadelphia in 1837 by Van Dusen & Birely of Kensington, Philadelphia, for the Philadelphia City Councils. She was used to keep the Delaware River free of ice during the winter months from 1837 to 1861.

=== Naval service, 1861 ===
The City Ice Boat was offered to the Union Navy free of expense soon after the outbreak of the American Civil War. She was placed in service at Philadelphia 23 April 1861, Commodore Oliver S. Glisson in command. She departed Philadelphia, Pennsylvania, the same day to protect the landing of troops at Annapolis, Maryland, to encourage Maryland's adherence to the Union and to be available for the defense of Washington, D.C.

Ice Boat was ordered to Washington for duty in the Potomac River 21 May arriving two days later. Most of her service was off Aquia Creek where she labored to stop trade across the Potomac River between Virginia and Maryland, occasionally engaging Confederate batteries on the Virginia shore.

News of the Union Army's defeat at the First Battle of Bull Run caused Ice Boat's return to Washington to defend the Nation's Capital. A fortnight later the ship was back off Aquia Creek where she remained until she was returned to her owner late in November 1861.

=== Commanding officers ===
During her seven months of service in the U.S. Navy, the Ice Boat served under the following officers:

Commanding Officers
Commander Oliver S. Glisson	23 April 1861–16 August 1861
Lieutenant Foxhall A. Parker, Jr.	17 August 1861–20 August 1861
Lieutenant Thomas Pattison	21 August 1861–16 November 1861
Acting Master F. P. Parks	17 November 1861–November 1861

=== Return to merchant service ===
After being returned to the City of Philadelphia, the vessel once again became City Ice Boat and returned to work for the City as an icebreaker. In 1866, her engines were removed to be used in a new, iron-hulled icebreaker built the same year, and her hull turned over to the shipbuilder for disposal.
