= John Steward (assemblyman) =

American politician

John Steward (October 21, 1807 – May 2, 1885) was an American politician in the 19th century. He was elected to represent Chautauqua County in the New York State Assembly from the Republican Party.

Steward served in the 87th State Assembly, from 1863 to 1864, during the Civil War, when he resided in Panama, New York.

== Family ==
His father was John Steward (1786–1826), and his mother was Eunice Wilcox (1787–1875). He married Johanna Glidden (1808–1896). They had five children, of which they had two sets of twins: Franklin G. Steward (1833–1908), Francis C. Steward (1833–1896), Henry C. Steward (1841–1892), Mary E. Steward (1846–1920), and Martha A. Steward (1846–1901)

New York State Assembly
Preceded by Emry Davis	New York State Assembly; Chautauqua County, 1st District; 1863–1864	Succeeded by Sextus H. Hungerford
