= Abner C. Mattoon =

American politician

Abner Clough Mattoon
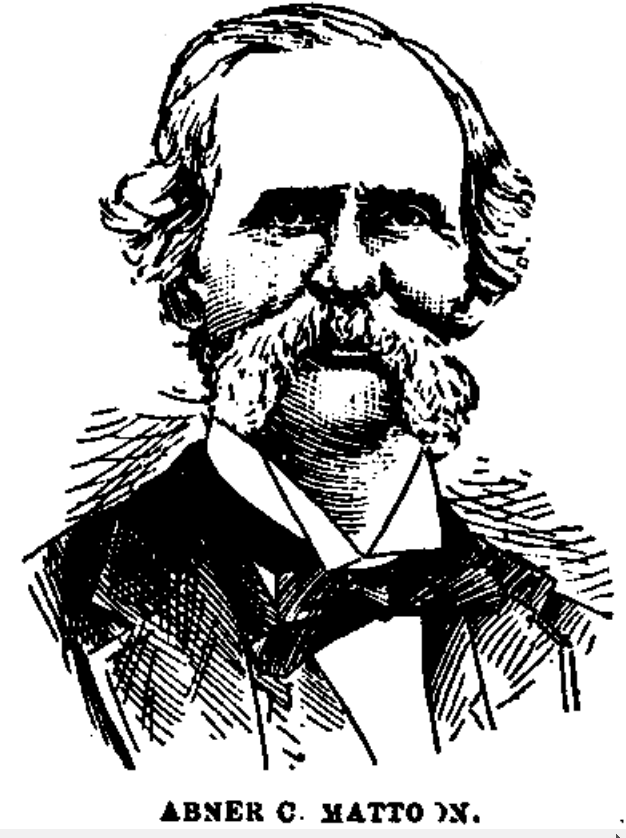
- Born: October 15, 1814; Locke, New York
- Died: November 20, 1895 (aged 81); Oswego, New York

Abner Clough Mattoon (October 15, 1814 – November 20, 1895) was an American merchant and politician from New York. He was the builder of the first tugboat that was steam powered that was built and operated west of the Hudson River.

== Life ==
He was born on October 15, 1814, in Locke, New York, to Henry and Lydia Ann (Clough) Mattoon. His grandfather, John Clough, was a Revolutionary War veteran.

The family removed to Rochester in 1816. He attended the common schools, and at age 14, after his father's death, began to work on the canals as a horse driver to help his mother support the family while continuing his schooling during the winter months. Within a year, he was promoted to tallyman on the Erie Canal.

In the early 1830s he moved west to take up boating on the Mississippi River. On his first trip down the river, the purser was taken ill, and at New Orleans he was given the temporary job of purser, owing to his knowledge of accounting for freight on the Erie Canal. After a short time he was awarded the permanent position of purser aboard the well known palace steamer Sultana.

After several years on the Mississippi, he and a friend left for the West Indies, but finding life there not to his liking, he returned to the United States, again making his home in Rochester. During the mid-1830s, still looking for opportunities westward, he made several trips to Ohio and Michigan, and in 1837 secured a grant of 80 acres in southeastern Michigan while listed as a resident of Genesee County near Flint.

Within a year, he had returned east, moving to Manhattan, apparently working in the freight business. While there he joined a men's social group, the Hiram Club, and frequented the cigar store at Broadway and Pearl Street owned by clubmate John Anderson, where he made the acquaintance of Anderson's employee, Mary Rogers, victim of a well publicized 1841 murder. In 1843, he worked as a traveling salesman for Lee, Bussing & Co., operating out of New York City.

In 1844, he returned to Rochester, where he became involved in local politics. Initially a Democrat, by 1844 he had allied with a "Democratic-Republican" faction calling for strict construction of the Constitution, and opposing annexation of foreign territory and extension of slavery. This group soon merged into the Whig Party. In December 1844 he married Caroline N. Nichols (1816-1906) in Rochester. They eventually had three sons: John Henry Mattoon (1846-1916), Edward A. Mattoon (1847-1939), and Willard N. Mattoon (1857-1904). Soon after their marriage, Mattoon returned to New York City, where he represented the Rochester-based Sidney Allen Transportation Company. In this position he constructed the first derrick on the New York docks at Coenties Slip, "which revolutionized the methods for handling freights from vessels, barges and canal boats."

Following a devastating fire which destroyed his Rochester home, he moved his family to Oswego in 1847, where he first worked as representative of the Troy, New York, transportation firm, Ide & Colt. By 1850 he went into business for himself, engaged in forwarding, milling, boat construction and the grain trade. He built and in 1851 launched the O.S. Howard, a sidewheeler steam tug, which was reportedly the first steam-powered tugboat to be constructed west of the Hudson River, the first to do business in Oswego harbor, and the first to operate on the Great Lakes.

In 1853, he was elected to Oswego's first Board of Education, to the local board of the State Normal School, and as alderman for the city's Third Ward, under Mayor James D. Colver. His rising political career suffered a setback two years later when he was badly defeated in a four-way race for the state assembly, but in the 1856 presidential race, he served as one of the new American or "Know-Nothing" Party's thirty-three electors for former President Millard Fillmore. By 1860, he was active in the Republican Party, in Oswego's Presbyterian Church, and in his work as a boatbuilder and commission merchant, shipping goods on the Great Lakes and on the inland canals to Troy and Albany. He was also one of the original incorporators of the Oswego Water Works Company.

With the outbreak of the Civil War, he was appointed by New York Governor Edwin D. Morgan to a military committee for the state's Twenty-first Senatorial District. In this capacity, he helped organize and recruit the 110th and 147th New York Volunteer Infantry regiments, the 12th New York Cavalry, and the 21st Battery New York Artillery. In 1862, he was elected a member of the New York State Assembly, representing the First Oswego District. He served in the New York State Assembly in the 1863 and 1864 sessions. His chief accomplishment as an assemblyman was obtaining state support for the Oswego State Normal and Training School (now the State University of New York at Oswego).

In 1867, he was elected to the New York State Senate representing the 21st Senatorial District, which encompassed Oswego County, serving in the 1868 and, after reelection, in the 1869 session. In this capacity, he was appointed, at his own request, to a committee investigating the infamous "Erie War," between Commodore Cornelius Vanderbilt's New York Central Railroad, which was attempting to take over the rival Erie Railroad, and the Erie's board, led by financiers Jay Gould and Jim Fisk, who issued "watered-down" stock to forestall a takeover. The case received national attention, and Mattoon's meetings with Erie officials, and his wavering votes on the issue subjected him to accusations of receiving bribes, and criticism from the press and such well-known figures as Horace Greeley and Thurlow Weed. Summoned before a Senate Select Committee investigating corruption in the Erie case, he provided extensive testimony. While the Committee absolved him of any criminal guilt, it questioned his judgment and discretion in the matter.

Unfavorable press from the Erie allegations, and an ongoing civil case accusing him of using "insider information" from his Senate position to influence Erie stock sales, led to Mattoon's defeat for reelection to his senatorial seat in 1869. He returned to Oswego and his business interests. In 1871, he contracted with a group of Florida and Georgia businessmen incorporated as the Peas Creek Immigrant & Agricultural Company to provide dredging services on the Peace River (Peas Creek) in southwestern Florida. In return for rendering the river navigable, the company was promised large tracts of public lands to be granted by the state government.

Mattoon converted the schooner Ellsworth to a screw steamer in his Oswego boatworks, and embarked on a voyage across the Erie Canal, through a number of inland passages to Cape Fear, North Carolina, then down the Atlantic coast to Key West. Before he could begin dredging efforts on the Peace River, however, a federal court upheld an earlier injunction barring the State of Florida from distributing public lands until a prior claim against the state was satisfied. The Peace River plans were put on hold, and eventually abandoned, and the Ellsworth returned to Oswego in 1872. Although the Florida venture proved a costly failure, business contacts made during the voyage south led Mattoon to transport grain along the coast of Virginia and North Carolina during the winter of 1872-73.

The Ellsworth burned off Stoney Island in Lake Ontario in 1877, but Mattoon salvaged the engine and gear and installed them in his new steam barge Thompson Kingsford, which launched in 1880. By this time, however, he had decreased his shipping and boatbuilding activities to concentrate on his extensive greenhouses and expanding floral business. As early as 1870, he listed his occupation as "flowerist."

A longtime sportsman and early proponent of conservation, he served as president of Oswego's Leatherstocking Club, and was instrumental in the foundation of the National Association for the Protection of Fish and Game. He was noted as an umpire and referee of baseball games and cricket matches in the Oswego area, and as an official in local boat and yacht races. In November 1881, he oversaw the transport of the Canadian sloop Atalanta through the Erie Canal and Hudson River to New York City to compete for the America's Cup. He was a guest of Captain Alexander Cuthbert aboard the Atalanta during her two controversial and ultimately unsuccessful Cup races against the American iron-hulled sloop Mischief, one off Manhattan and the other off Staten Island.

He was appointed Customs Collector for Oswego in 1883, and by 1889 served as Deputy United States Marshal for the Northern District of New York, a position chiefly concerned with marine damage claims and salvage cases. The following year, at age seventy-five, Marshal Mattoon seized the schooner Vickery, which had sunk off Wellesley Island at the mouth of the St. Lawrence River, by diving to the wreck and affixing the required notice, wearing a suit of "diving armor."

In December 1891, Mattoon again attracted the attention of the national press with his testimony in the controversial Laura V. Appleton vs. New York Life Insurance Company suit. Mrs. Appleton, the daughter of Mattoon's old Manhattan friend, John Anderson, had sued to regain some of her late father's valuable real estate, including the Plaza Hotel on Fifth Avenue, claiming that her father was incompetent at the time he had made his will. The case was appealed to the New York Supreme Court, where it was settled before a verdict was reached, but not before Mattoon gave sensational accounts of Anderson's alleged incompetency. He described the latter's increasingly erratic behavior as early as the 1860s and 1870s, evidenced by his claimed communication with spirits, including those of Italian unifier Giuseppe Garibaldi and the murdered "cigar girl," Mary Rogers, whose unsolved case remained a matter of much speculation, and had even inspired a short story by Edgar Allan Poe.

By the 1890s, he remained active as a justice of the peace and Deputy United States Marshal, as well as dealing in real estate. He also served as president of the Old Volunteer Firemen's Association of Oswego. In 1893 and 1894, he embarked on an extended hunting and fishing trip through the far western states. Upon his return, as president of the local Firemen's Association, he took a leading part in the state association's annual convention, held in Oswego. Shortly afterwards, his health failed, and he was confined to his house for the remaining months of his life.

Mattoon died on November 20, 1895, at his home in Oswego, Oswego County, New York. Notices of his death appeared in newspapers across the country, and he was buried in Riverside Cemetery in Oswego.

New York State Assembly
| Preceded by Elias Root | New York State Assembly; Oswego County, 1st District; 1863–1864 | Succeeded by Elias Root |
New York State Senate
| Preceded by John J. Wolcott | New York State Senate; 21st District; 1868–1869 | Succeeded by William H. Brand |
