= USS John P. Kennedy =

Cargo ship of the United States Navy

History

United States
- Name: Sea Nymph (–1853); John P. Kennedy (1853–)
- Namesake: John P. Kennedy
- Acquired: 1853
- Commissioned: 1853
- Decommissioned: 31 October 1855
- Fate: Sold November 1855

General characteristics
- Displacement: 350 tons
- Complement: 45
- Armament: 1 × 24 pound howitzer; 2 × 12 pound howitzer

USS John P. Kennedy, the former wooden sailing ship Sea Nymph, was a supply ship of the US Navy. She was purchased at New York City in 1853 to participate in an expedition to the North Pacific Ocean to explore for commercial and naval purposes waters in the area of the Bering Straits and the China Seas, which were "frequented by American whale ships and trading vessels in their routes between the United States and China." The expedition, under Commander Cadwalader Ringgold, besides supply ship John P. Kennedy, consisted of sloop-of-war Vincennes (flagship), brig Porpoise, schooner Fenimore Cooper, and bark John Hancock.

John P. Kennedy departed New York 21 June 1853 and arrived Cape of Good Hope 10 September. She departed Cape of Good Hope 9 November with the expedition and arrived Batavia, Java, the day after Christmas. She took active part in surveying operations in Indonesian waters until putting in at Singapore 4 April 1854 en route to Hong Kong where she arrived 25 May for repairs. In August the high cost of placing her in good condition prompted Lieutenant John Rodgers, who had succeeded Commander Ringgold in command, to turn John P. Kennedy over to the East Indies Squadron to become a guard ship at the American Factory, Canton, China. The ship stood out of Hong Kong 20 August and arrived at her new station 2 days later.

After a violent storm 23 July 1855, John P. Kennedy assisted American ship Isabella Catana in getting afloat; and she aided survivors of a Chinese man-of-war after the ship caught fire and blew up 6 September. She departed Canton 20 October in tow of Powhatan, arriving Hong Kong the next day. She decommissioned there 31 October and was sold in November 1855.
