= Albany Penitentiary =

American prison (1848–1931)

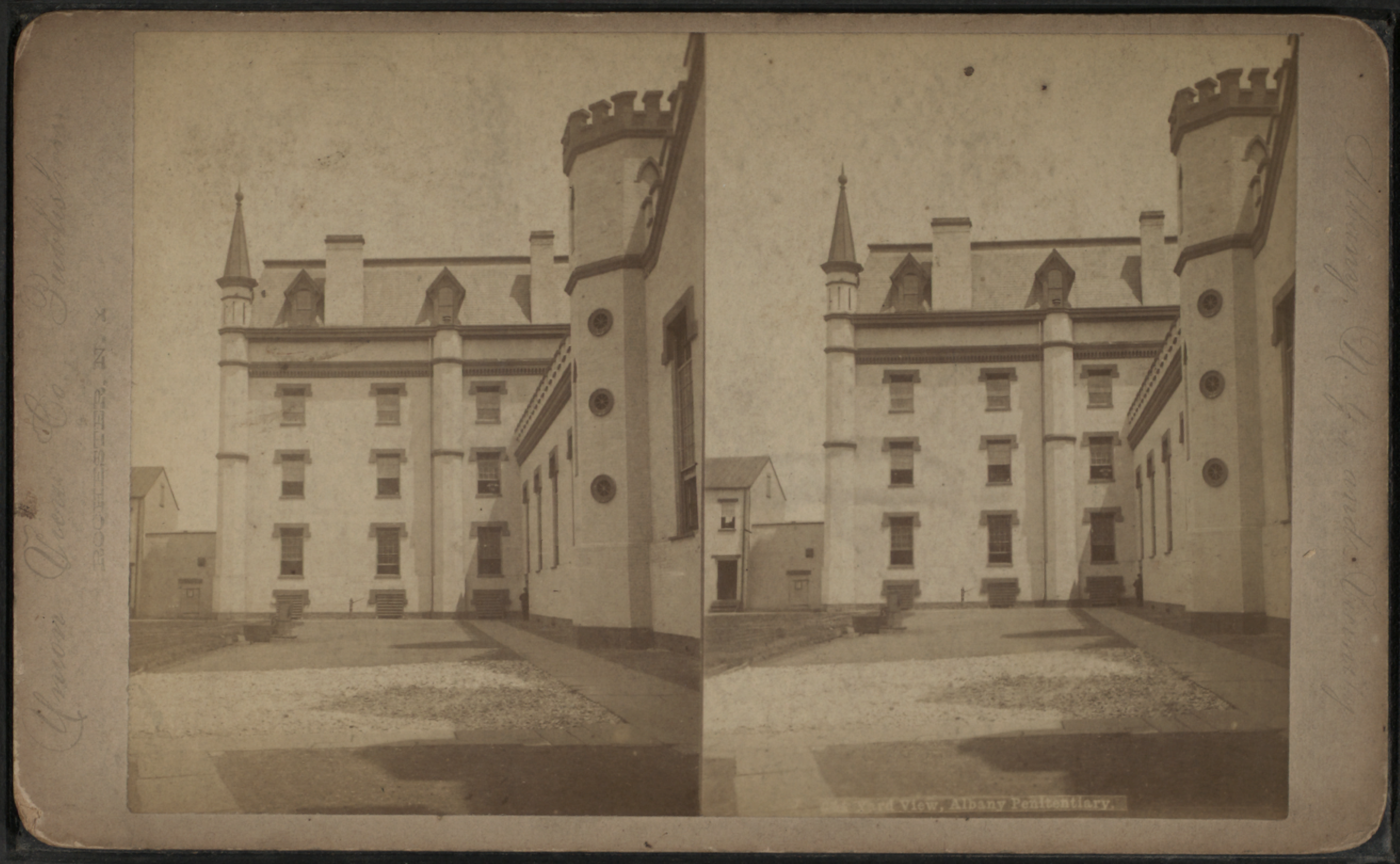
- Yard view, Albany Penitentiary, from Robert N. Dennis collection of stereoscopic views
- Location: Albany, New York
- Status: Closed
- Opened: 1848
- Closed: 1931

Albany Penitentiary was an American prison in Albany, New York that operated from 1848 until 1931. The prison was designed by Amos Pillsbury, who was also the first superintendent. Before the American Civil War, the main type of for-profit prison labor done at the penitentiary was the "making of coarse boots and shoes for the Southern negroes." After the closure of the Arsenal Penitentiary, Albany became the destination for prisoners of the District of Columbia. In 1910, the State Prison Commission issued a report with "scathing criticism of existing conditions" in the penitentiary. The prison was demolished in 1933, at which time demolition crews found "'dungeons' that were likely used to keep rule-breaking inmates in deep isolation."

The turn-of-the-century Bertillion-system mugshots from the penitentiary are kept in the Albany Hall of Records.
