= John J. Wolcott =

American politician (1810–1881)

Member of the New York State Senate from the 21st district
- In office January 1, 1866 – December 31, 1867
- Preceded by: Cheney Ames
- Succeeded by: Abner C. Mattoon

Member of the New York State Assembly from the Oswego County 2nd district
- In office January 1, 1858 – December 31, 1858
- Preceded by: Leonard Ames
- Succeeded by: James J. Colt

Personal details
- Born: John Jefferson Wolcott; June 20, 1810 Trenton, New York, U.S.
- Died: July 31, 1881 (aged 71) Fulton, Oswego County, New York, U.S.
- Party: Republican
- Other political affiliations: Free Soil; Democratic
- Spouse: Sarah Ann Fox (m. 1835)
- Occupation: Politician, merchant, banker

John Jefferson Wolcott (June 20, 1810 Trenton, Oneida County, New York – July 31, 1881 Fulton, Oswego County) was an American merchant, banker and politician from New York.

== Life ==
He was the son of Samuel Wolcott (c. 1775 – 1857). In 1831, he became a merchant. In 1834, he removed to Fulton. On September 10, 1835, he married Sarah Ann Fox (1814–1888). He was President of the Oswego River Bank, and later the First National Bank of Fulton.

Wolcott entered politics as a Democrat, sided with the Barnburners, joined the Free Soil Party in 1848, then became a Soft-Shell Democrat, and finally joined the Republican Party upon its foundation.

He was Chairman of the Board of Supervisors of Oswego County in 1854; President of the Village of Fulton for two terms; a member of the New York State Assembly (Oswego Co., 2nd D.) in 1858; and a member of the New York State Senate (21st D.) in 1866 and 1867.

== Sources ==
- The New York Civil List compiled by Franklin Benjamin Hough, Stephen C. Hutchins and Edgar Albert Werner (1870; pg. 444)
- Life Sketches of the State Officers, Senators, and Members of the Assembly of the State of New York, in 1867 by S. R. Harlow & H. H. Boone (pg. 168ff)
- Fox-Wolcott marriage at Family Tree Maker

New York State Assembly
| Preceded by Leonard Ames | New York State Assembly; Oswego County, 2nd District; 1858 | Succeeded by James J. Coit |
New York State Senate
| Preceded by Cheney Ames | New York State Senate; 21st District; 1866–1867 | Succeeded by Abner C. Mattoon |
