= Theophilus C. Callicot =

American politician (1826–1920)

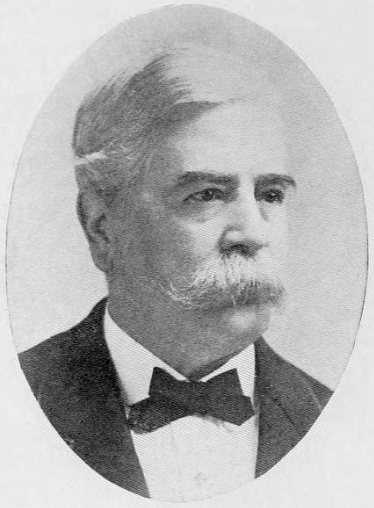

Speaker of the New York State Assembly
- In office 1863

Member of the New York State Assembly
- In office 1863
- Constituency: 5th District

Member of the New York State Assembly
- In office 1860
- Constituency: 3rd District

Personal details
- Born: Theophilus Carey Callicot; 1826 Cornwall, England
- Died: November 28, 1920 (aged 93–94) Samatag, Germany
- Party: Democratic
- Spouse: Fitzina H. Callicot
- Children: 2
- Education: Delaware College; Yale Law School
- Occupation: Lawyer, newspaper editor, politician

Theophilus Carey Callicot (Note: The name is often written "Callicott" in contemporary newspaper accounts, but in the letter he sent to Secretary of State Lansing in 1918 he signed his name with only one t.) (1826 – November 28, 1920) was an American lawyer, newspaper editor and politician.

== Early life ==
He was born in Cornwall, England in 1826, and came with his parents to the United States as a child. The family settled at Fairfax, Virginia. He graduated from Delaware College, then studied law at Yale Law School and was admitted to the bar in New York City in 1847.

He lived with his wife Fitzina H. Callicot (1829–1867) at 158 High Street in Brooklyn at the time of the death of their one-year-old daughter Mary Fitzina in 1852. Later they had another daughter, Williamina Frederica (1854–1875).

In 1853, he published Hand-book of Universal Geography: Being a Gazetteer of the World.

== State Assembly ==
He was a Democratic member of the New York State Assembly in 1860 (Kings Co., 3rd D.) and 1863 (Kings Co., 5th D.).

In 1860, during the debate of black suffrage, he told the Assembly that "the proposition to put Negroes on a footing of political equality with white men is repugnant to the sense of the American people. They will never consent to share the proud title of 'American citizen' with an inferior and abject race."

In March 1861, Callicot assisted Mitchell Sanford to defend Assemblyman Jay Gibbons at the latter's trial before the Assembly on charges of bribery. After Sanford's unexpected death on March 29, Callicot pleaded on behalf of Gibbons until the latter was expelled by the Assembly on April 3.

In 1863, the New York State Assembly was tied, having 64 Republicans and Democrats each. The election of a Speaker proved to be difficult. During the stalemate, Callicot offered the Republican leader Chauncey M. Depew a deal: If the Republicans elect him Speaker, then Callicot would help the Republicans elect a U.S. Senator from New York. Depew accepted, and on January 26, Callicot was elected Speaker on the 92nd ballot. Shortly afterward, the Democrats accused Callicot of improper and corrupt proceedings to achieve his election as Speaker and a Select Committee was appointed to investigate. On April 20, the Assembly adopted the majority report of the Select Committee, declaring Callicott "entirely innocent."

At the next state election he was defeated for re-election to the Assembly.

== Federal office ==
In 1865, President Andrew Johnson appointed him Customs Collector at Brooklyn, New York. In 1868, he was accused of "traffic in illegal liquor", and convicted. He was fined $10,000 and sent to prison for two years. After serving out his term at Albany Penitentiary, he continued to be detained there because he did not pay the fine, and was released only after a presidential pardon in December 1870.

== Newspaper editor ==
In 1890, he had been the editor of the Albany Evening Times in Albany, New York, for more than 15 years, when Governor David B. Hill transferred the State Printing from the Albany Argus, a pro-Cleveland paper, to Callicot's paper. As the editor, Callicot had "carried on the business of political assassination, abusing the best and lauding the worst men of the Democratic Party. He has used the knife and hatchet freely upon such Democrats as Samuel J. Tilden, Daniel Manning, the Cassidys, Governor Lucius Robinson and President Grover Cleveland."

In 1896, he became the editor of the Albany Argus.

== Death ==
He died in Samatag, Germany on November 28, 1920.

== Notes ==
New York State Assembly
Preceded by Harmanus B. Duryea	New York State Assembly; Kings County, 3rd District; 1860	Succeeded by Nathan Comstock
Preceded by Charles L. Benedict	New York State Assembly; Kings County, 5th District; 1863	Succeeded by John C. Perry
Political offices
Preceded by Henry J. Raymond	Speaker of the New York State Assembly; 1863	Succeeded by Thomas G. Alvord
