= Presidency of William McKinley =

U.S. president from 1897 to 1901

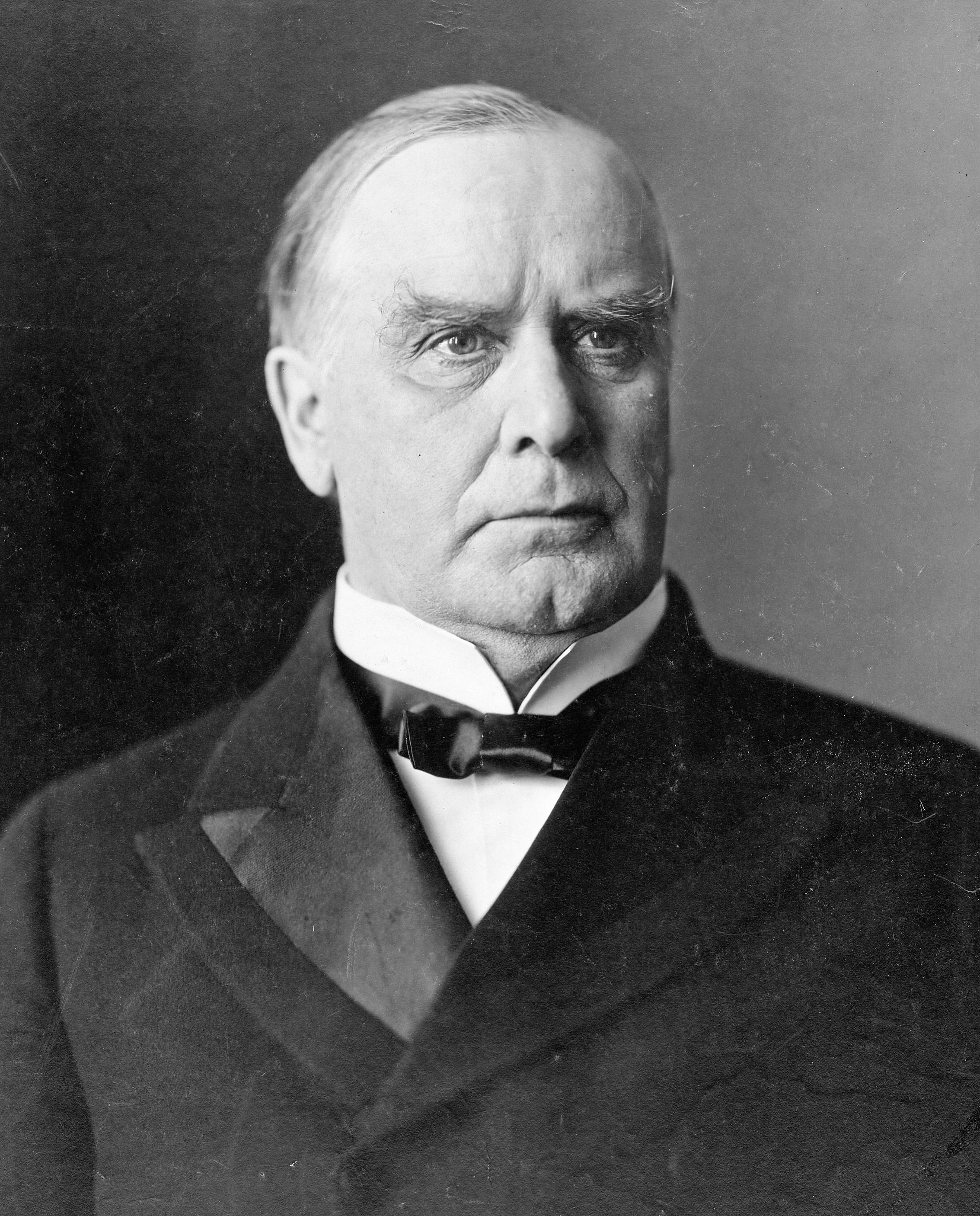
- Presidency of William McKinley; March 4, 1897 – September 14, 1901 (Assassination)
- Vice President: Garret Hobart (1897–1899); None (1899–1901) (Note: Vice President Hobart died in office. As this was before the adoption of the Twenty-fifth Amendment in 1967, a vacancy in the office of vice president was not filled until the next ensuing election and inauguration.); Theodore Roosevelt (Mar–Sep. 1901)
- Cabinet: See list
- Party: Republican
- Election: 1896; 1900
- Seat: White House
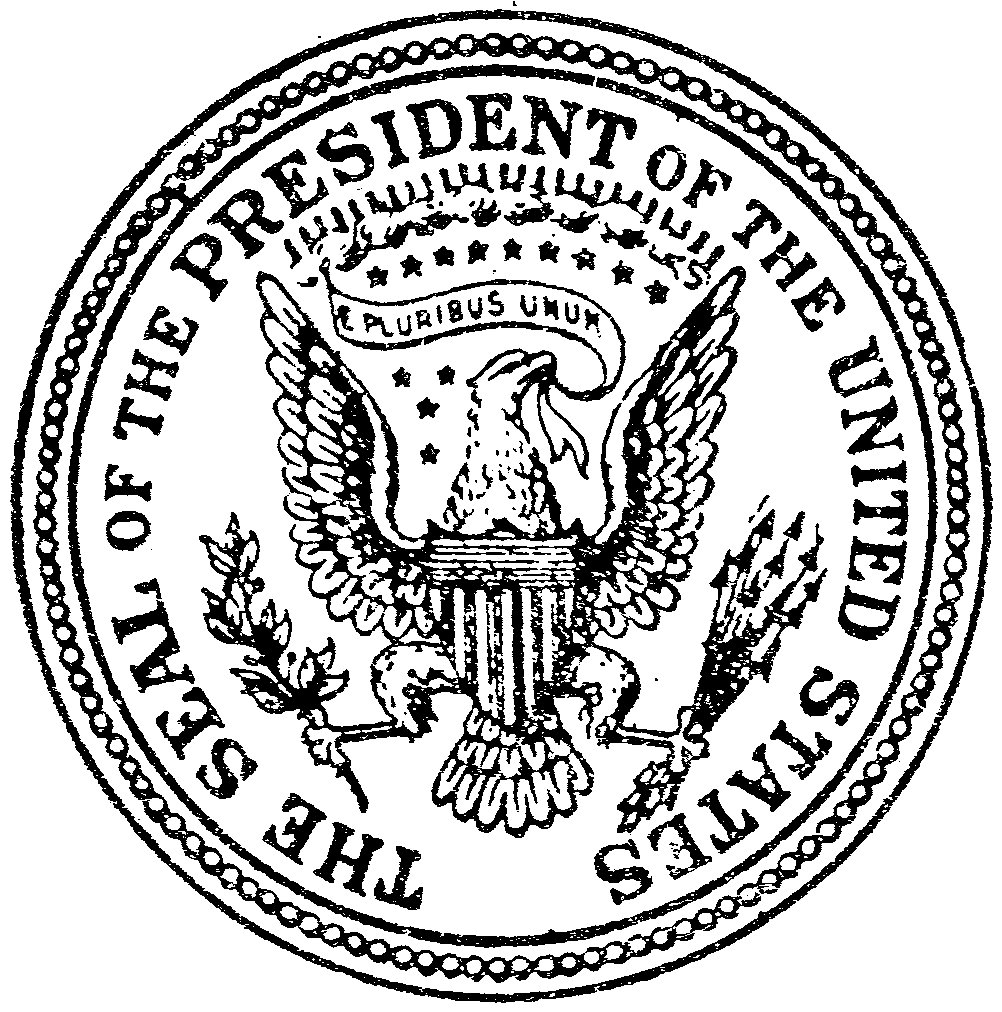
- Seal of the president (1894–1945)

William McKinley served as the 25th president of the United States from March 4, 1897, until his assassination on September 14, 1901. McKinley is best known for conducting the successful Spanish–American War (1898); taking ownership of the Republic of Hawaii; and purchasing the Philippines, Guam and Puerto Rico. It includes the 1897 Dingley Tariff which raised rates to protect manufacturers and factory workers from foreign competition, and the Gold Standard Act of 1900 that rejected free silver inflationary proposals. Rapid economic growth and a decline in labor conflict marked the presidency and he was easily reelected. He was succeeded by his vice president, Theodore Roosevelt.

A member of the Republican Party, McKinley took office following the 1896 presidential election, in which he defeated Democrat William Jennings Bryan. In the campaign, McKinley advocated "sound money", promised that high tariffs would restore prosperity, and denounced Bryan as a radical who promoted class warfare. He defeated Bryan again in the 1900 presidential election, in a campaign focused on imperialism in the Philippines, high tariffs, and free silver. McKinley's presidency marked the beginning of an era in American political history, called the "Fourth Party System" or "Progressive Era", which lasted to the early 1930s. On the national level, this period was generally dominated by the Republican Party.

In 1897–1898, the most pressing issue was an insurrection in Cuba against repressive Spanish colonial rule. Americans sympathized with the rebels and demanded action to resolve the crisis. The administration tried to persuade Spain to liberalize its rule but when negotiations failed, both sides wanted war. American victory in the Spanish–American War was quick and decisive. During the war the United States took temporary possession of Cuba; it was promised independence but it remained under the control of the U.S. Army throughout McKinley's presidency. The status of the Philippines was heavily debated, and became an issue in the 1900 election, with Democrats opposed to American ownership. McKinley decided it needed American protection and it remained under U.S. control until the 1940s. As a result of the war, the United States also took permanent possession of Guam and Puerto Rico. Under McKinley's leadership, the United States also annexed the independent Republic of Hawaii in 1898. Unlike the other new possessions, citizens of Hawaii became American citizens and Hawaii became a territory with an appointed governor. McKinley's foreign policy created an overseas empire and put the U.S. on the world's list of major powers.

In 1897 the economy rapidly recovered from the severe depression, called the Panic of 1893. McKinley's supporters in 1900 postulated that the new tariff and the commitment to the gold standard were responsible. McKinley is consistently ranked by political historians in the upper tier of United States presidents. On William McKinley, historian Lewis L. Gould stated:

He was a political leader who confirmed the Republicans as the nation's majority party; he was the architect of important departures in foreign policy; and he was a significant contributor to the evolution of the modern presidency. On these achievements rest his substantial claims as an important figure in history of the United States.

== Election of 1896 ==
McKinley rose to prominence within the Republican Party as a congressman closely associated with protective tariffs. He earned national notoriety in the 1880s and 1890s for his nationwide campaigning, and in 1891 he won election as Governor of Ohio. In the lead-up to the 1896 election, McKinley and his manager, Cleveland businessman Mark Hanna, quietly built up support for a presidential bid. When rivals Speaker Thomas Brackett Reed and Senator William B. Allison sent agents outside their states to organize support for their candidacies, they found that McKinley agents had preceded them. By the time the 1896 Republican National Convention began in St. Louis in June, McKinley had an ample majority of delegates, and he won the nomination on the first ballot of the convention. Hanna selected Republican National Committee vice chairman Garret Hobart of New Jersey for vice president. Hobart, a wealthy lawyer, businessman, and former state legislator, was not widely known, but as Hanna biographer Herbert Croly pointed out, "if he did little to strengthen the ticket he did nothing to weaken it".

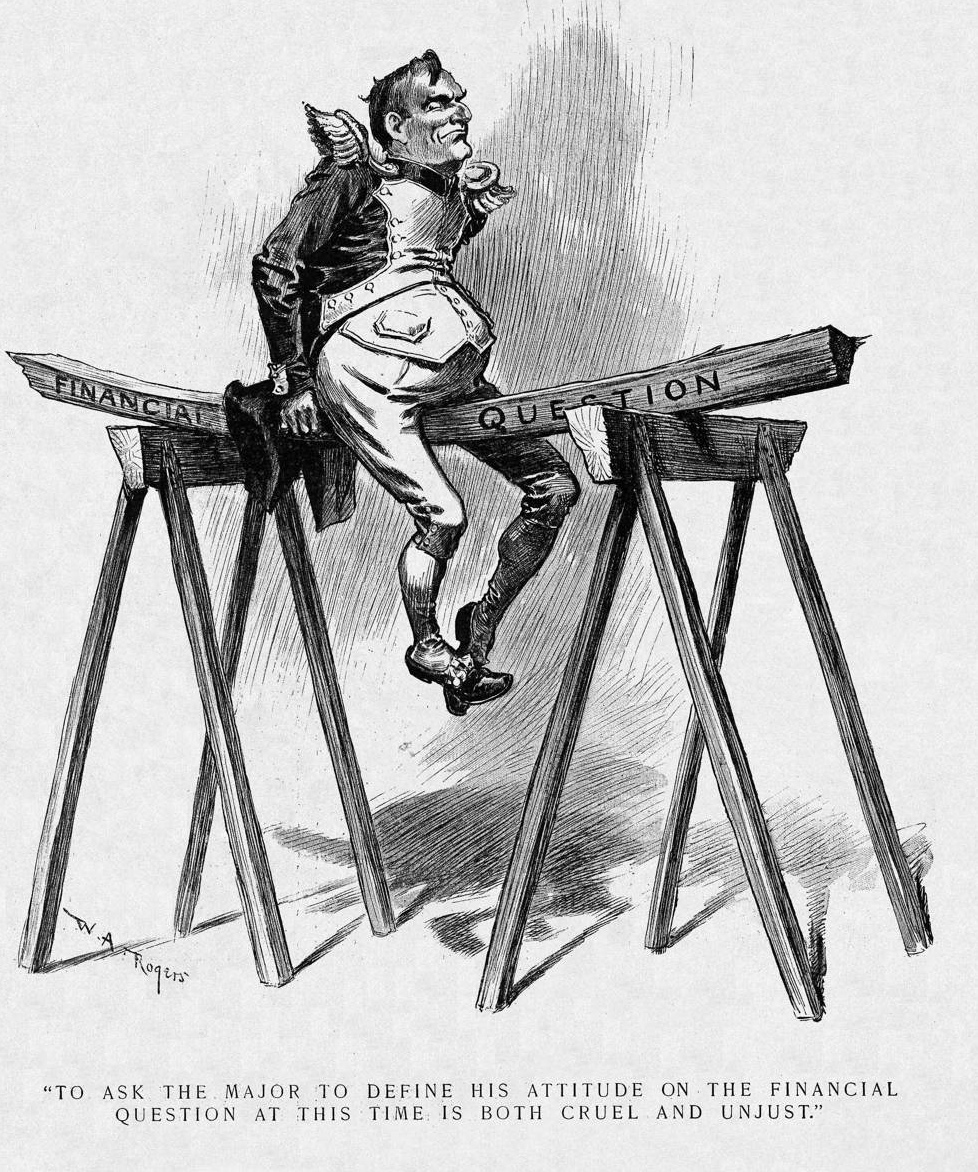
June 1896 Harper's Weekly cartoon showing McKinley painfully riding the rail of the currency question.

In the final days before the convention, McKinley decided, after hearing from politicians and businessmen, that the platform should endorse the gold standard, though it should allow for bimetallism by international agreement. Adoption of the platform caused some western delegates, led by Colorado Senator Henry M. Teller, to walk out of the convention. However, Republicans were not nearly as divided on the issue as were Democrats, especially as McKinley promised future concessions to silver advocates. Democratic President Grover Cleveland firmly supported the gold standard, but an increasing number of rural Democrats, especially in corn belt and western states, called for a bimetallic "free silver" system. The silverites took control of the 1896 Democratic National Convention and chose William Jennings Bryan for president; he had electrified the delegates with his Cross of Gold speech which became famous for its closing phrase, "You shall not press down upon the brow of labor this crown of thorns, you shall not crucify mankind upon a cross of gold." Bryan's financial radicalism shocked bankers, as many thought that his inflationary program would bankrupt the railroads and ruin the economy. Hanna cultivated the backing of these bankers, giving Republicans a massive financial advantage that allowed McKinley's campaign to invest $3.5 million for speakers and distribute over 200 million pamphlets advocating the Republican position on the money and tariff questions.

The Republican Party printed and distributed 200 million pamphlets and sent hundreds of speakers out across the nation to deliver stump speeches on McKinley's behalf. Bryan was portrayed as a radical, a demagogue, and a socialist, while McKinley was cast as the guarantor of full employment and industrial growth. By the end of September, the party had discontinued printing material on the silver issue, and were entirely concentrating on the tariff question. The battleground proved to be the Midwest—the South and most of the West were conceded to the Democrats—and Bryan spent much of his time in those crucial states.

1896 electoral vote results.

On November 3, 1896, McKinley was victorious, winning the Electoral College vote 271 to 176, and receiving 7,102,246 popular votes to Bryan's 6,502,925. McKinley won the entire Northeast and Midwest. Bryan had concentrated entirely on the silver issue, and had not failed to broaden his appeal to include urban workers. McKinley's view of a stronger central government building American industry through protective tariffs and a dollar based on gold triumphed. McKinley's coalition included most Northern cities, well-to-do farmers, industrial laborers, and most ethnic voters aside from Irish Americans. The 1896 presidential election is often seen as a realigning election, as with it the nation's focus shifted from repairing the damage caused by the Civil War, to building for the future through social reform. It was also a realigning election in that it launched a long period of Republican control over Congress and the White House, the Fourth Party System, that would continue until 1932.

== First inauguration ==
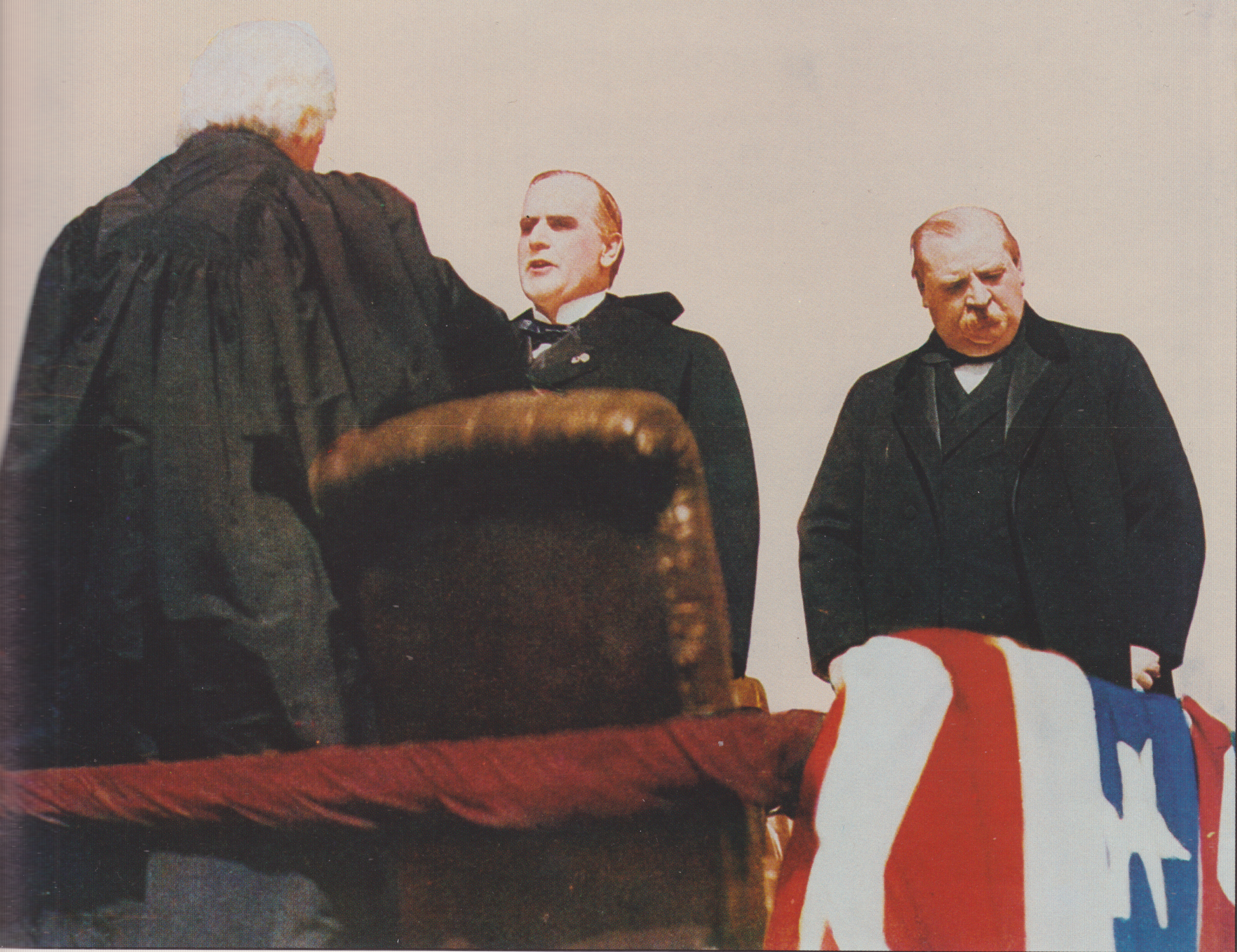
Chief Justice Melville Fuller swears in William McKinley as president; outgoing President Grover Cleveland at right.

McKinley's first presidential inauguration was held on March 4, 1897, in front of the Original Senate Wing, at the U.S. Capitol. Chief Justice Melville Fuller administered the oath of office. It was the first inaugural ceremony recorded by a motion picture camera. McKinley gave a lengthy inaugural address, in which he urged tariff reform, and stated that the currency issue would have to await tariff legislation. He also warned against U.S. foreign interventions, declaring,

We want no wars of conquest. We must avoid the temptation of territorial aggression.

Historian Nick Kapur argues that McKinley's priorities were based on his values of arbitrationism, pacifism, humanitarianism, and manly self-restraint, and not on external pressures.

== Administration ==
McKinley cabinet
Office	Name	Term
President	William McKinley	1897–1901
Vice President	Garret Hobart	1897–1899
none	1899–1901
Theodore Roosevelt	1901
Secretary of State	John Sherman	1897–1898
William R. Day	1898
John Hay	1898–1901
Secretary of the Treasury	Lyman J. Gage	1897–1901
Secretary of War	Russell A. Alger	1897–1899
Elihu Root	1899–1901
Attorney General	Joseph McKenna	1897–1898
John W. Griggs	1898–1901
Philander C. Knox	1901
Postmaster General	James Albert Gary	1897–1898
Charles Emory Smith	1898–1901
Secretary of the Navy	John Davis Long	1897–1901
Secretary of the Interior	Cornelius Newton Bliss	1897–1899
Ethan A. Hitchcock	1899–1901
Secretary of Agriculture	James Wilson	1897–1901

Maine Congressman Nelson Dingley Jr. was McKinley's first choice for secretary of the treasury, but Dingley preferred to remain as chairman of the Ways and Means Committee. Charles Dawes, who had been Hanna's lieutenant in Chicago during the campaign, was considered for the Treasury post but by some accounts, Dawes considered himself too young; he would instead become the comptroller of the currency in 1898. McKinley ultimately appointed Lyman J. Gage, president of the First National Bank of Chicago and a Gold Democrat, as secretary of the treasury. Leadership of the Navy Department went to former Massachusetts Congressman John Davis Long, an old colleague of McKinley's from his time serving in the House of Representatives. Although McKinley was initially inclined to allow Long to choose his own assistant secretary of the navy, there was considerable pressure on the president-elect to appoint Theodore Roosevelt, the head of the New York City Police Commission. McKinley was reluctant to appoint Roosevelt, stating to one Roosevelt booster, "I want peace and I am told that your friend Theodore is always getting into rows with everybody." Nevertheless, he appointed Roosevelt.

McKinley chose James Wilson, a former congressman with strong support in the state of Iowa, to be his secretary of agriculture. McKinley's first choice for Postmaster General was Mark Hanna, but he declined the position. McKinley also considered appointing Henry Clay Payne, but opposition from Robert M. La Follette's faction of the party convinced him to appoint another individual. McKinley settled on James Albert Gary, a Republican from Maryland. For the position of Attorney General, McKinley turned to another old friend from the House, Joseph McKenna of California. Cornelius Newton Bliss, who was acceptable to the divided New York Republican Party, was selected as the secretary of the interior. The position of secretary of war went to Russell A. Alger, a former general who had also served as the governor of Michigan. Competent enough in peacetime, Alger proved inadequate once the Spanish–American War began. With the War Department plagued by scandal, Alger resigned at McKinley's request in mid-1899 and was succeeded by Elihu Root. During the war, General Henry Clark Corbin gained McKinley's trust as the adjutant general of the army, and Corbin acted as the de facto commander of the army under McKinley administration's auspices.

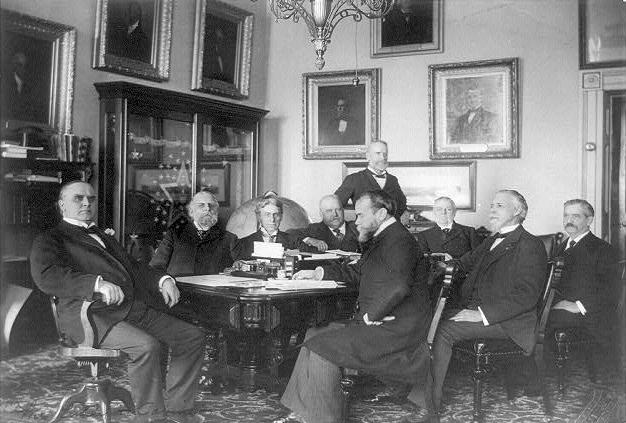
President McKinley and his Cabinet, 1898 Far left: William McKinley. Left to right, back: Lyman J. Gage, John W. Griggs, John D. Long, James Wilson standing, and Cornelius N. Bliss. Left to right, front: John Hay, Russell A. Alger, and Charles E. Smith.

President McKinley and his Cabinet, 1901 At far left: William McKinley. Left to right, back: Lyman J. Gage, John W. Griggs, John D. Long, James Wilson, and Ethan A. Hitchcock. Left to right, front: John Hay, Elihu Root, and Charles E. Smith.

McKinley's most controversial Cabinet appointment was that of John Sherman as secretary of state. Sherman was not McKinley's first choice for the position; he initially offered it to Senator William Allison. One consideration in Senator Sherman's appointment was to provide a place in the Senate for Hanna, and, as Sherman had served as secretary of the treasury under President Rutherford B. Hayes, only the State position was likely to entice him from the Senate. Sherman's mental faculties were decaying even in 1896; this was widely spoken of in political circles, but McKinley did not believe the rumors. Sherman's mental incapacity became increasingly apparent after he took office. He was often bypassed by his first assistant, McKinley's Canton crony William R. Day, and by the second secretary, Alvey A. Adee. Day, an Ohio lawyer unfamiliar with diplomacy, was often reticent in meetings; Adee was somewhat deaf. One diplomat characterized the arrangement, "the head of the department knew nothing, the first assistant said nothing, and the second assistant heard nothing". McKinley asked Sherman to resign in 1898, and Day became the new secretary of state. Later that year, Day was succeeded by John Hay, a veteran diplomat who had served as assistant secretary of state in the Hayes Administration. McKinley made two other changes to his Cabinet in 1898; Charles Emory Smith succeeded the ailing Gary as Postmaster General, while John W. Griggs replaced McKenna as Attorney General after McKenna joined the Supreme Court.

For most of McKinley's time in office, George B. Cortelyou served as the president's personal secretary. Cortelyou acted as the de facto White House press secretary and chief of staff. Vice President Garret Hobart, as was customary at the time, was not invited to Cabinet meetings, but he proved a valuable adviser to McKinley. Hobart leased a residence close to the White House, and the two families visited each other without formality. Hobart died of heart disease in November 1899. As no constitutional provision existed for filling an intra-term vacancy in the vice presidency (prior to ratification of the Twenty-fifth Amendment in 1967), the office was left vacant for the balance of his term. In March 1901, Theodore Roosevelt, who served as McKinley's running mate in the 1900 election, became vice president.

== Judicial appointments ==
After the retirement of Justice Stephen Johnson Field, McKinley appointed Attorney General Joseph McKenna to the Supreme Court of the United States in December 1897. The appointment aroused some controversy as McKenna's critics in the Senate said he was too closely associated with railroad interests and lacked the qualifications of a Supreme Court justice. Despite the objections, McKenna's nomination was approved unanimously. McKenna responded to the criticism of his legal education by taking some courses at Columbia Law School for several months before taking his seat. McKenna served on the court until 1925, often taking centrist positions between more conservative and more progressive judges. Along with his Supreme Court appointment, McKinley appointed six judges to the United States Courts of Appeals, and 28 judges to the United States district courts.

== Domestic affairs ==
=== Economy and trusts ===
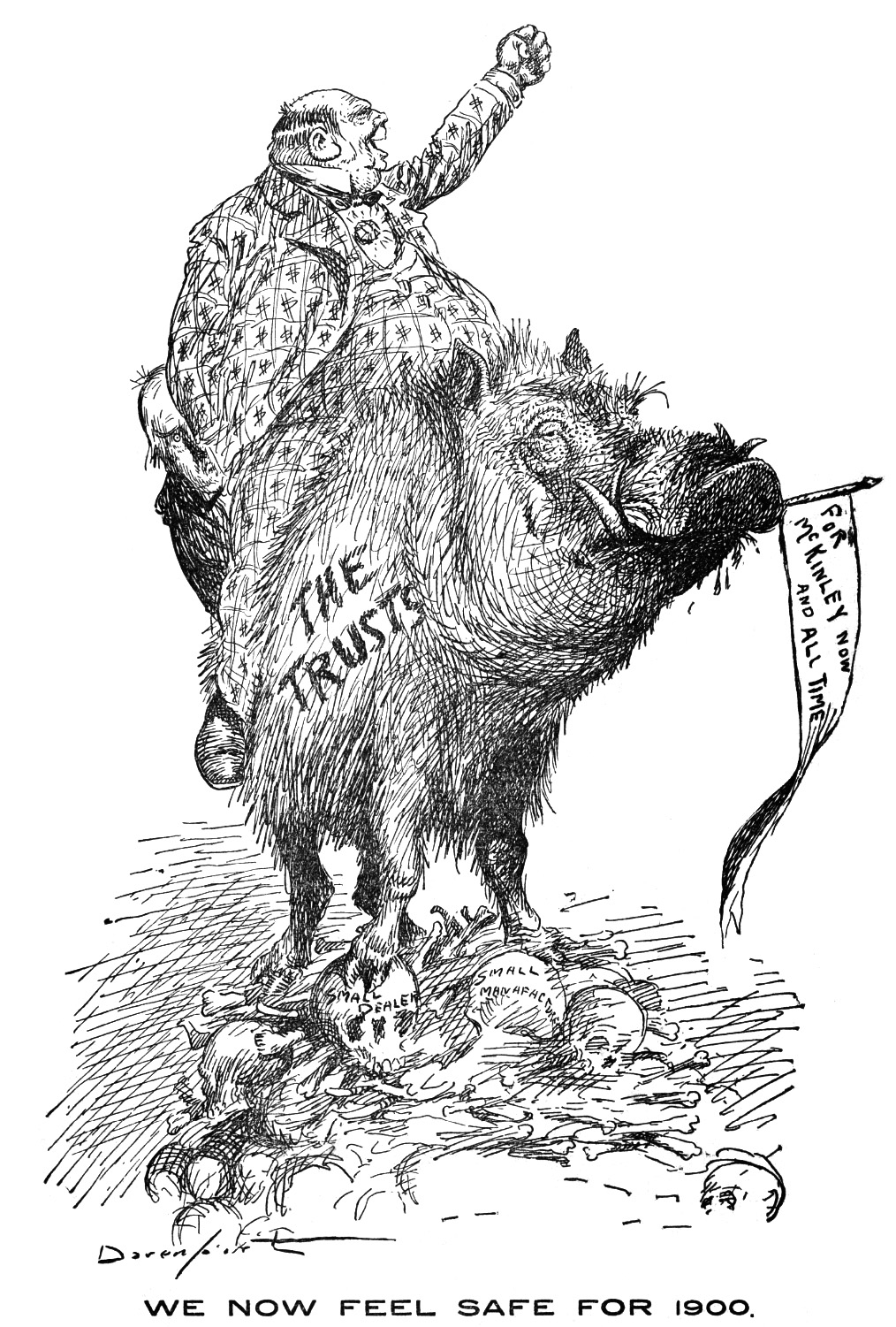
1899 antitrust cartoon by Homer Davenport

The long, deep depression that followed the Panic of 1893 finally ended in late 1896, as all the economic indicators in 1897 turned positive. Business newspapers and magazines were filled with optimistic reports throughout 1897. The New York Commercial of 3 January 1898 surveyed a wide variety of businesses and industries nationwide and concluded, "after three years of waiting and of false starts, the groundswell of demand is at last begun to rise with the steadiness which leaves little doubt that an era of prosperity has appeared." It reported that January 1898 represents "a supreme moment in the period of transition from depression to comparative prosperity". The unemployment rate, which had been at nearly 20 percent in 1895, dropped to 15 percent in 1897 and to 8 percent in early 1898.

McKinley largely adhered to the laissez-faire attitude that the Cleveland administration had held towards trusts. Attorneys General Joseph McKenna and John W. Griggs pursued some antitrust cases under the terms of the Sherman Antitrust Act and the Supreme Court case of United States v. E. C. Knight Co., but the McKinley administration sympathized with the view that consolidation could be beneficial in many cases. Debate over the role of trusts grew throughout McKinley's presidency, and the issue would become increasingly important after McKinley's presidency.

=== Tariffs and monetary policy ===
==== Dingley Tariff ====
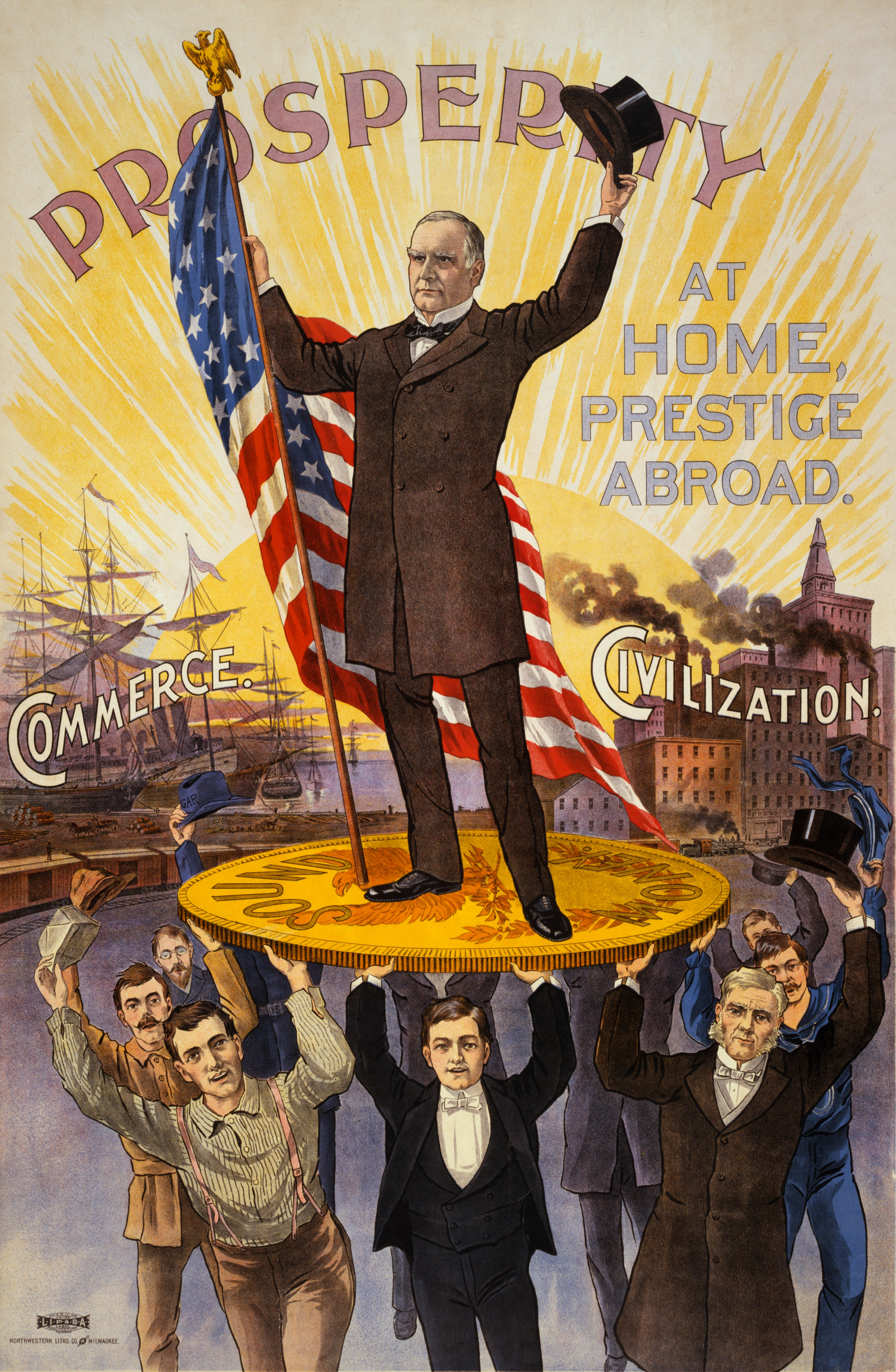
1900 reelection poster celebrates McKinley standing tall on the gold standard with support from soldiers, sailors, businessmen, factory workers and professionals.

After the 1896 election, McKinley indicated that he would call special session of Congress to address the tariff, and Congressman Dingley began hearings on the bill in December 1896, during the lame duck period of Cleveland's presidency. While Democrats tended to oppose high tariffs, arguing that they hurt consumers by raising prices, McKinley and other leading Republicans viewed high tariffs as essential to the protection of American businesses against foreign competition. Additionally, the tariff provided nearly half of the government's revenue, and a rate increase could help put an end to the deficits that the government had experienced in the midst of the Panic of 1893. Before taking office, McKinley also authorized Senator Edward O. Wolcott of Colorado to travel to Europe to discuss the possibility of an international bimetallic agreement. International bimetallism represented a middle course between proponents of free silver and those who favored a gold standard.

When the special session of Congress convened in March 1897, Dingley introduced the Dingley Act to revise the Wilson–Gorman Tariff Act of 1894. McKinley supported the bill, which increased tariffs on wool, sugar, and luxury goods, but the proposed new rates alarmed the French, who exported many luxury items to the United States. The Dingley Act passed the House easily, but faced resistance in the Senate. Passage of the bill in the Senate required the support of several Western Republicans, including Wolcott, whose chief priority was an international agreement on bimetallism. French representatives offered to cooperate with the United States in developing such an international agreement if the new tariff rates were reduced. Led by Wolcott, Allison, Nelson Aldrich, and Orville H. Platt, the Senate amended the Dingley Bill to lower rates on French products and approved of a commission charged with negotiating the international bimetallic agreement.

As doubts about the likelihood of reaching an international monetary agreement grew, the Senate inserted a provision that authorized the president to reach bilateral treaties providing for the mutual reduction of tariff duties. The Senate passed its version of the bill in July 1897, and a conference committee produced a final bill that contained the reciprocity provision but generally adhered to the higher tariff rates set by the original House bill. McKinley, who strongly supported the idea of reciprocity, signed the Dingley Act into law in late July 1897. The McKinley administration later reached reciprocity treaties with France and other countries, but opposition in the Senate prevented their ratification. The final tariff was highest on products considered to be necessities of life, and some numbers show that cost of living rose by as much as 25% as a result of the Dingley Tariff.

==== Monetary policy ====
While Congress debated the tariff, the U.S. and France approached Britain to gauge its enthusiasm for bimetallism. The government of Prime Minister Lord Salisbury showed some interest in the idea and told Wolcott that he would be amenable to reopening the mints in India to silver coinage if the Indian Viceroy's Executive Council agreed. News of a possible departure from the gold standard stirred up immediate opposition from gold partisans, and misgivings by the Indian administration led Britain to reject the proposal. Opposition from Britain led to the collapse of negotiations for joint adoption of bimetallism by France, Britain, and the United States.

With the international effort a failure, McKinley turned away from silver coinage and embraced the gold standard. Agitation for free silver eased as prosperity returned and gold from recent strikes in the Yukon and Australia increased the monetary supply even without silver coinage. In the absence of international agreement, McKinley favored legislation to formally affirm the gold standard, but was initially deterred by the silver strength in the Senate. In 1900, with another campaign ahead, McKinley urged Congress to pass such a law while economic conditions were strong. Aldrich and other leading Senate Republicans fashioned a bill that established gold as the only standard for the redemption of paper money, but placated Wolcott and other Western Republicans by including a provision allowing for international bimetallism. The Senate passed the bill in a near-party-line vote in March 1900, and McKinley signed the bill into law later that month. Democrats tried to make free silver a campaign issue in 1900, but it failed to attract much attention.

=== Pluralism ===
A key element of McKinley's appeal in an 1896 election was the spirit of pluralism. No group in America was to be ostracized or banned. Everyone was welcome to enjoy the new prosperity. McKinley had a very broad appeal in terms of race, ethnicity, region and class. Where Bryan had ridiculed and denounced bankers and railroads, McKinley welcomed the business community. McKinley was famous as a champion of high tariffs to protect the high wages of American factory workers. Proposals for immigration restriction and attacks on Jews, Eastern Europeans and Southern Europeans had no place in the McKinley administration. He appointed Irish Catholic labor leader Terence Vincent Powderly, founder of the Knights of Labor organization, as Commissioner-General of Immigration. Immigration restrictions such as literacy tests proposed by Republican Senator Henry Cabot Lodge of Massachusetts and his allies in the Immigration Restriction League (founded in 1894) had been included in the 1896 GOP platform, but McKinley and the party leadership in Congress blocked their passage. The anti-Catholicism that had started to appear in the 1890s faded away, as shown by the rapid decline of the American Protective Association. Nonetheless, restrictive immigration laws would continue to receive support during and after McKinley's tenure, partly due to the rising number of immigrants from Southern Europe and Eastern Europe.

==== Reconciliation with Southern whites ====
A high priority for McKinley's pluralism was full unification of the white South psychologically and patriotically back into the United States. This initiative conflicted with the civil rights of blacks, which were being increasingly restricted in the South. While McKinley did not officially endorse the "Lost Cause of the Confederacy", he did reach out in terms of appointments and speeches and visits to the white South. Reconciliation was achieved during the Spanish–American War, as enlistment rates across the South were quite high. The swift stunning victory certainly boosted the reconciliation process. Historian David W. Blight argues:

The Lost Cause became an integral part of national reconciliation by dint of sheer sentimentalism, by political argument, and by recurrent celebrations and rituals. For most white Southerners, the Lost Cause evolved into a language of vindication and renewal, as well as an array of practices and public monuments through which they could solidify both their Southern pride and their Americanness. In the 1890s, Confederate memories no longer dwelled as much on mourning or explaining defeat; they offered a set of conservative traditions by which the entire country could gird itself against racial, political, and industrial disorder. And by the sheer virtue of losing heroically the Confederate soldier provided a model of masculine devotion and courage in an age of gender anxieties and ruthless material striving.

==== Growing racial tensions ====
The black vote supported McKinley in 1896 and African Americans were hopeful of progress towards racial equality. McKinley had spoken out against lynching while governor, and most African Americans who could vote supported him in 1896. McKinley's priority, however, was in ending sectionalism, and African Americans were generally disappointed by his policies and appointments. Although McKinley made some appointments of African Americans to low-level government posts, and received some praise for that, the appointments were less than they had received under previous Republican administrations. Blanche Bruce, an African American who during Reconstruction had served as senator from Mississippi, received the post of register at the Treasury Department; this post was traditionally given to an African American by Republican presidents. McKinley appointed several black postmasters; however, when whites protested the appointment of Justin W. Lyons as postmaster of Augusta, Georgia, McKinley asked Lyons to withdraw (he was subsequently given the post of Treasury register after Bruce's death in 1898). The president also appointed George B. Jackson, a former slave, to the post of customs collector in Presidio, Texas. African Americans in Northern states felt that their contributions to McKinley's victory were overlooked, as few were appointed to office.

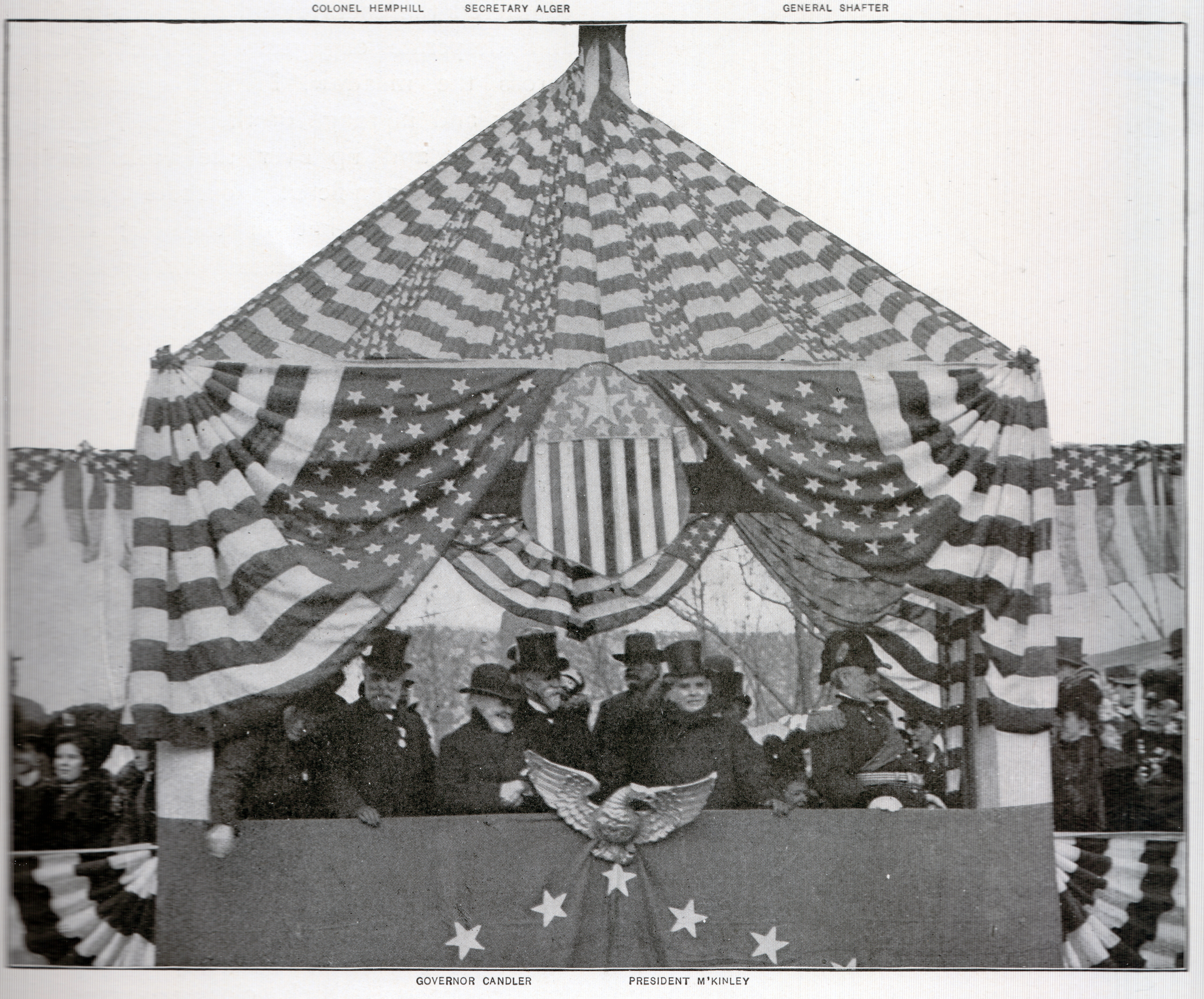
McKinley, (right of center) flanked by Georgia Governor Allen D. Candler (front row to McKinley's left) and Gen. William Rufus Shafter, reviewing the Atlanta Peace Jubilee parade, December 15, 1898.

African Americans saw the onset of war in 1898 as an opportunity to display their patriotism, and black soldiers fought bravely at El Caney and San Juan Hill. African Americans in the peacetime Army had formed elite units; nevertheless they were harassed by whites as they traveled from the West to Tampa for embarkation to the war. Under pressure from black leaders, McKinley required the War Department to commission black officers above the rank of lieutenant. The heroism of the black troops did not still racial tensions in the South, as the second half of 1898 saw several outbreaks of racial violence; eleven African Americans were killed in riots in the Wilmington massacre. McKinley toured the South in late 1898, hoping for sectional reconciliation. In addition to visiting Tuskegee Institute and Booker T. Washington, he addressed the Georgia legislature, wearing a badge of gray, and visited Confederate memorials. In his tour of the South, McKinley did not mention the racial tensions or violence. Although the president received a rapturous reception from Southern whites, many African Americans, excluded from official welcoming committees, felt alienated by the president's words and actions.

The administration's response to racial violence was minimal, causing McKinley to lose further black support. When black postmasters were assaulted at Hogansville, Georgia in 1897, and at Lake City, South Carolina the following year, McKinley issued no statement of condemnation. Although black leaders criticized McKinley for inaction, supporters responded by saying there was little the president could do to intervene. Critics replied by saying that he could at least publicly condemn such events, as former President Benjamin Harrison had done. McKinley also took no action to prevent the passage of Jim Crow laws designed to disenfranchise and segregate African Americans in the South. According to Gould and later biographer Phillips, given the political climate in the South, there was little McKinley could have done to improve race relations, and he did better than later presidents Theodore Roosevelt, who doubted racial equality, and Woodrow Wilson, who supported segregation.

=== Civil service reform ===
The issue of the spoils system and reform of civil service had been one of the dominant issues of the Gilded Age. Past presidents had made significant inroads with regards to the expansion of the merit system. McKinley attempted to strike a middle ground on this issue. More partisan Republicans, however, despised the reforms made by President Grover Cleveland, which had left many Democratic officials in the civil service. McKinley ended up caving to the partisans, and on May 29, 1899, issued an executive order which exempted 3 to 4000 jobs from competitive civil service examinations, a backtrack from the merit system.

== Foreign affairs ==
The McKinley administration brought foreign affairs to the top of the agenda for the first time since the 1840s. Most Republicans supported an expansionist foreign policy, building the American presence in the world that suited its increasing economic dominance. Opposition came from an anti-imperialist element that included some old time Republicans, as well as most Democrats. However, in 1898 the Democrats took the lead in demanding Spain stop oppressing the independent-minded people of Cuba, while McKinley tried to stop the rush to war.

=== Annexation of Hawaii ===
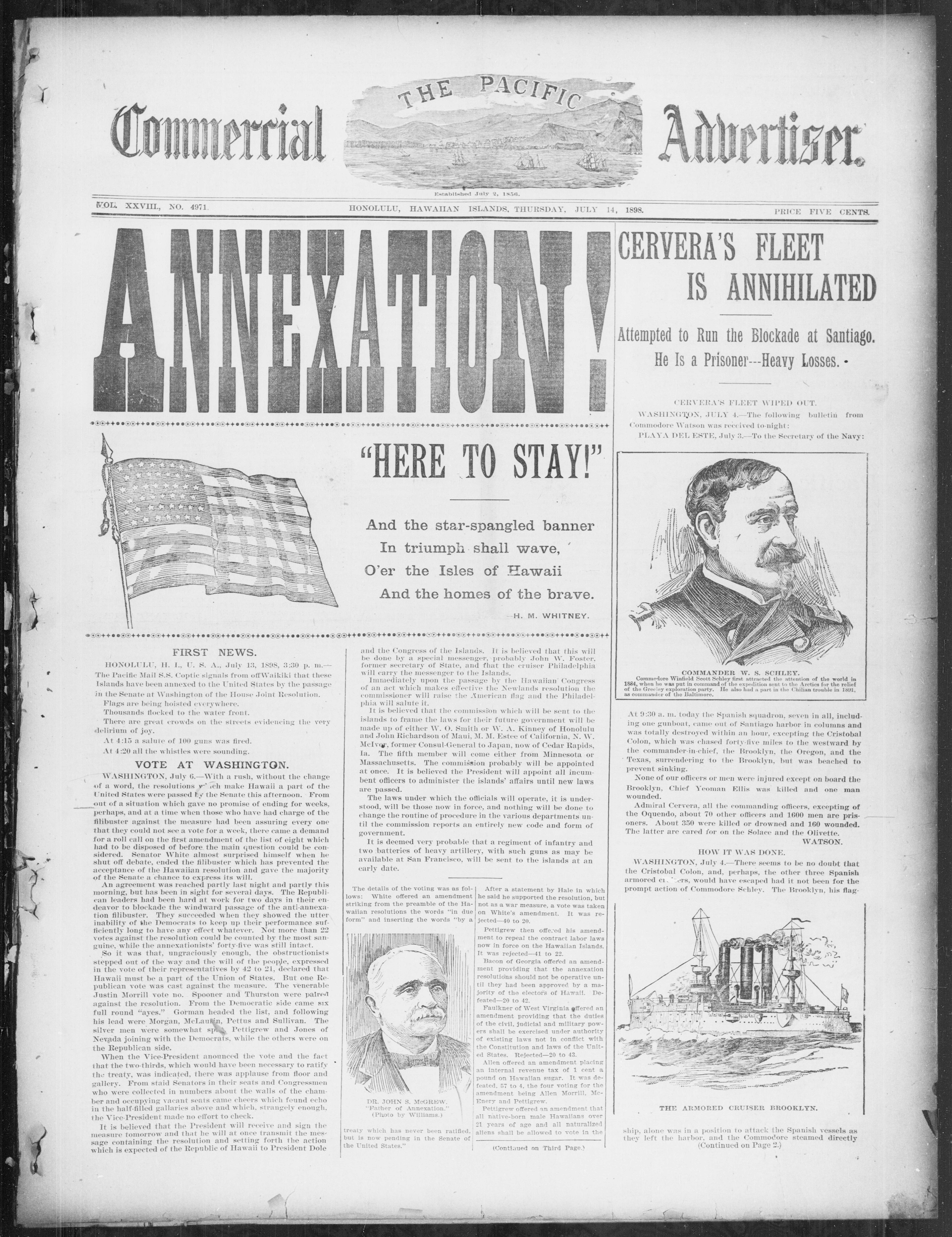
Annexation of the Republic of Hawaii in 1898

Hawaii long had very close political, cultural, religious and economic relations with the United States. The native population was virtually powerless in small villages. Large sugar interests had imported tens of thousands of workers, mostly Japanese. Expansionists spoke of annexation and the business community in Honolulu wanted annexation by the U.S., fearing that otherwise Japan would take it over from a king who had no army. The reciprocity treaty in the 1870s had made the Kingdom of Hawaii a "virtual satellite" of the United States. After Queen Liliʻuokalani announced plans to issue a new constitution designed to give her absolute power, she was immediately overthrown by the business community, which requested annexation by the United States. President Harrison tried to annex Hawaii, but his term ended before he could win Senate approval of an annexation treaty, and Cleveland withdrew the treaty. Cleveland deeply opposed annexation because of a personal conviction that would not tolerate what he viewed as an immoral action against the little kingdom. Additionally, annexation faced opposition from domestic sugar interests opposed to the importation of Hawaiian sugar, and from some Democrats who opposed acquiring an island with a large non-white population. The temporary government of Hawaii thereupon established the Republic of Hawaii which was recognized by the world powers as an independent nation.

McKinley pursued the annexation of the Republic of Hawaii as one of his top foreign policy priorities. In American hands, Hawaii would serve as a base to dominate much of the Pacific, defend the Pacific Coast, and expand trade with Asia. Republican Congressman William Sulzer stated that "the Hawaiian Islands will be the key that will unlock to us the commerce of the Orient." McKinley stated, "we need Hawaii just as much and a good deal more than we did California. It is manifest destiny." President McKinley's position was that Hawaii could never survive on its own. It would quickly be gobbled up by Japan—already a fourth of the islands' population was Japanese. Japan would then dominate the Pacific and undermine American hopes for large-scale trade with Asia.

The issue of annexation became a major political issue heatedly debated across the United States, which carried over into the 1900 presidential election. By then the national consensus was in favor of the annexation of both Hawaii and the Philippines. Historian Henry Graff says that in the mid-1890s, "unmistakably, the sentiment at home was maturing with immense force for the United States to join the great powers of the world in a quest for overseas colonies."

The drive for expansion was opposed by a vigorous nationwide anti-expansionist movement, organized as the American Anti-Imperialist League. The anti-imperialists listened to Bryan as well as industrialist Andrew Carnegie, author Mark Twain, sociologist William Graham Sumner, and many older reformers from the Civil War era. The anti-imperialists believed that imperialism violated the fundamental principle that just republican government must derive from "consent of the governed." The anti-imperialist league argued that such activity would necessitate the abandonment of American ideals of self-government and non-intervention—ideals expressed in the Declaration of Independence, George Washington's Farewell Address and Abraham Lincoln's Gettysburg Address. In addition to the Anti-Imperialist League within the United States, forces in Hawaii vigorously opposed the annexation. The Hawaiian Patriotic League and its female counterpart, both of which were made up of native Hawaiians, began a mass petition drive. The petition, which was clearly titled "Petition Against Annexation", was signed by over half of the native Hawaiian population. However, the anti-imperialists could not stop the even more energetic forces of imperialism. They were led by Secretary of State Hay, naval strategist Alfred T. Mahan, Senator Henry Cabot Lodge, Secretary of War Root, and Theodore Roosevelt. These expansionists had vigorous support from newspaper publishers William Randolph Hearst and Joseph Pulitzer, who whipped up popular excitement. Mahan and Roosevelt designed a global strategy calling for a competitive modern navy, Pacific bases, an isthmian canal through Nicaragua or Panama, and, above all, an assertive role for the United States as the largest industrial power. They warned that Japan was sending a warship and was poised to seize an independent Hawaii, and thereby be within range of California—a threat that alarmed the West Coast. The Navy prepared the first plans regarding a war with Japan.

McKinley submitted an annexation treaty in June 1897, but anti-imperialists prevented it from winning the support of two-thirds of the Senate. In mid-1898, during the Spanish–American War, McKinley and his congressional allies made another attempt to win congressional approval of an annexation measure. With McKinley's support, Democratic Representative Francis G. Newlands of Nevada introduced a joint resolution that provided for the annexation of Hawaii. The Newlands Resolution faced significant resistance from Democrats and anti-expansionist Republicans like Speaker of the House Reed, but pressure from McKinley helped the bill win passage by wide margins in both houses of Congress. McKinley signed the Newlands Resolution into law on July 8, 1898. McKinley biographer H. Wayne Morgan notes, "McKinley was the guiding spirit behind the annexation of Hawaii, showing ... a firmness in pursuing it". Congress passed the Hawaiian Organic Act in 1900, establishing the Territory of Hawaii. McKinley appointed Sanford B. Dole, who had served as the president of the Republic of Hawaii from 1894 to 1898, as the first territorial governor.

=== Spanish–American War ===
==== Cuban crisis ====
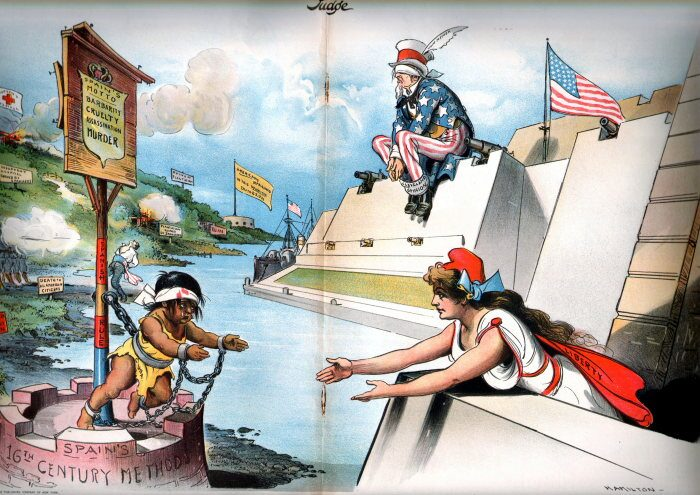
Editorial cartoon calling for humanitarian intervention in Cuba. Columbia (the American people) reaches out to help oppressed Cuba in 1897 while Uncle Sam (the U.S. government) is blind to the crisis and will not use its powerful guns to help. Judge magazine, February 6, 1897.

By the time McKinley took office, rebels in Cuba had waged an intermittent campaign for freedom from Spanish colonial rule for decades. By 1895, the conflict had expanded to a war for independence. The United States and Cuba enjoyed close trade relations, and the Cuban rebellion adversely affected the American economy which was already weakened by the depression. As rebellion engulfed the island, Spanish reprisals grew ever harsher, and Spanish authorities began removing Cuban families to guarded camps near Spanish military bases. The rebels put high priority on their appeals to the sympathy of ordinary Americans, and public opinion increasingly favored the rebels. President Cleveland had supported continued Spanish control of the island, as he feared that Cuban independence would lead to a racial war or intervention by another European power. McKinley also favored a peaceful approach, but he hoped to convince Spain to grant Cuba independence, or at least to allow the Cubans some measure of autonomy. The United States and Spain began negotiations on the subject in 1897, but it became clear that Spain would never concede Cuban independence, while the rebels and their American supporters would never settle for anything less.

Business interests overwhelmingly gave strong support to McKinley's go-slow policies. Big business, high finance, and Main Street businesses across the country were vocally opposed to war and demanded peace, as the uncertainties of a potentially long, expensive war posed serious threat to full economic recovery. The leading railroad magazine editorialized, "from a commercial and mercenary standpoint it seems peculiarly bitter that this war should come when the country had already suffered so much and so needed rest and peace." The strong anti-war consensus of the business community strengthened McKinley's resolve to use diplomacy and negotiation rather than brute force to end the Spanish tyranny in Cuba. On the other hand, humanitarian sensibilities reached fever pitch as church leaders and activists wrote hundreds of thousands of letters to political leaders, calling for intervention in Cuba. These political leaders in turn pressured McKinley to turn the ultimate decision for war over to Congress.

In January 1898, Spain promised some concessions to the rebels, but when American consul Fitzhugh Lee reported riots in Havana, McKinley obtained Spanish permission to send the battleship USS Maine to Havana to demonstrate American concern. On February 15, the Maine exploded and sank with 266 men killed. Public opinion was disgusted with Spain for losing control of the situation, but McKinley insisted that a court of inquiry determine whether the explosion of the Maine was accidental. Negotiations with Spain continued as the court of inquiry considered the evidence, but on March 20, the court ruled that the Maine was blown up by an underwater mine. As pressure for war mounted in Congress, McKinley continued to negotiate for Cuban independence. Spain refused McKinley's proposals, and on April 11, McKinley turned the matter over to Congress. He did not ask for war, but Congress declared war anyway on April 20, with the addition of the Teller Amendment, which disavowed any intention of annexing Cuba. European powers called on Spain to negotiate and give in; Britain supported the American position. Spain ignored the calls and fought the hopeless war alone in order to defend its honor and keep the monarchy alive.

==== Historical interpretations of McKinley's role ====
McKinley put it succinctly in late 1897 that if Spain failed to resolve its crisis, the United States would see "a duty imposed by our obligations to ourselves, to civilization and humanity to intervene with force." Most historians argue that an upsurge of humanitarian concern with the plight of the Cubans was the main motivating force that caused the war with Spain in 1898. Louis Perez states, "Certainly the moralistic determinants of war in 1898 has been accorded preponderant explanatory weight in the historiography." By the 1950s, however, some political scientists said that policy was unwise because it was based on idealism, arguing that a better policy would have been realism in terms of American self interest. They discredited the idealism by suggesting the people were deliberately misled by propaganda and sensationalist yellow journalism. Political scientist Robert Osgood, writing in 1953, led the attack on the American decision process as a confused mix of "self-righteousness and genuine moral fervor", in the form of a "crusade" and a combination of "knight-errantry and national self- assertiveness." Osgood argued:

A war to free Cuba from Spanish despotism, corruption, and cruelty, from the filth and disease and barbarity of General 'Butcher' Weyler's reconcentration camps, from the devastation of haciendas, the extermination of families, and the outraging of women; that would be a blow for humanity and democracy.... No one could doubt it if he believed – and skepticism was not popular – the exaggerations of the Cuban Junta's propaganda and the lurid distortions and imaginative lies pervade by the "yellow sheets" of Hearst and Pulitzer at the combined rate of 2 million [newspaper copies] a day.

For much of the 20th century historians and textbooks disparaged McKinley as a weak leader—echoing Roosevelt, who called him spineless. They blamed McKinley for losing control of foreign policy and agreeing to an unnecessary war. A wave of new scholarship in the 1970s, from both right and left, reversed the older interpretation. Robert L. Beisner summed up the new views of McKinley as a strong leader. He said McKinley called for war—not because he was bellicose, but because he wanted:

what only war could bring—an end to the Cuban rebellion, which outraged his humanitarian impulses, prolonged instability in the economy, destroyed American investments and trade with Cuba, created a dangerous picture of an America unable to master the affairs of the Caribbean, threatened to arouse uncontrollable outburst of jingoism, and diverted the attention of U.S. policymakers from historic happenings in China. Neither spineless nor bellicose, McKinley demanded what seemed to him morally unavoidable and essential to American interests.

Along similar lines Joseph Fry summarizes the new scholarly appraisals:

McKinley was a decent, sensitive man with considerable personal courage and great political facility. A master manager of men, he tightly controlled policy decisions within his administration....Fully cognizant of the United States' economic, strategic, and humanitarian interests, he had laid out a "policy" early in his administration that ultimately and logically led to war. If Spain could not quell the rebellion through "civilized" warfare, the United States would have to intervene. In early 1898, the Havana riots, the De Lome letter, the destruction of the Maine, and the Redfield Proctor speech convinced McKinley that the autonomy project had failed and that Spain could not defeat the rebels. He then demanded Cuban independence to end both the suffering on the island and the uncertainty in American political and economic affairs.

==== Course of the war ====
The telegraph and the telephone gave McKinley a greater control over the day-to-day management of the war than previous presidents had enjoyed. He set up the first war room and used the new technologies to direct the army's and navy's movements. McKinley did not get along with the Army's commanding general, Nelson A. Miles. Bypassing Miles and Secretary of War Alger, the president looked for strategic advice first from Miles's predecessor, General John Schofield, and later from Adjutant General Henry Clarke Corbin. McKinley presided over an expansion of the Regular Army from 25,000 to 61,000 personnel; including volunteers, a total of 278,000 men served in the Army during the war. McKinley not only wanted to win the war, he also sought to bring North and South together again, as white Southerners enthusiastically supported the war effort, and one senior command went to a former Confederate General. His ideal was a unity with Northerner and Southerner, white and black, fighting together for the United States.

Since 1895, the Navy had planned to attack the Philippines if war broke out between the United States and Spain. On April 24, McKinley ordered the Asiatic Squadron under the command of Commodore George Dewey to launch an attack on the Philippines. On May 1, Dewey's force defeated the Spanish navy at the Battle of Manila Bay, destroying Spanish naval power in the Pacific. The next month, McKinley increased the number of troops sent to the Philippines and granted the force's commander, Major General Wesley Merritt, the power to set up legal systems and raise taxes—necessities for a long occupation. By the time the troops arrived in the Philippines at the end of June 1898, McKinley had decided that Spain would be required to surrender the archipelago to the United States. He professed to be open to all views on the subject; however, he believed that as the war progressed, the public would come to demand retention of the islands as a prize of war, and he feared that Japan or possibly Germany might seize the islands.

Meanwhile, in the Caribbean theater, a large force of regulars and volunteers gathered near Tampa, Florida, for an invasion of Cuba. The army faced difficulties in supplying the rapidly expanding force even before they departed for Cuba, but by June, Corbin had made progress in resolving the problems. The U.S. Navy began a blockade of Cuba in April while the Army prepared to invade the island, on which Spain maintained a garrison of approximately 80,000. Disease was a major factor: for every American soldier killed in combat in 1898, seven died of disease. The U.S. Army Medical Corps made great strides in treating tropical diseases. There were lengthy delays in Florida—Colonel William Jennings Bryan spent the entire war there as his militia unit was never sent to combat.

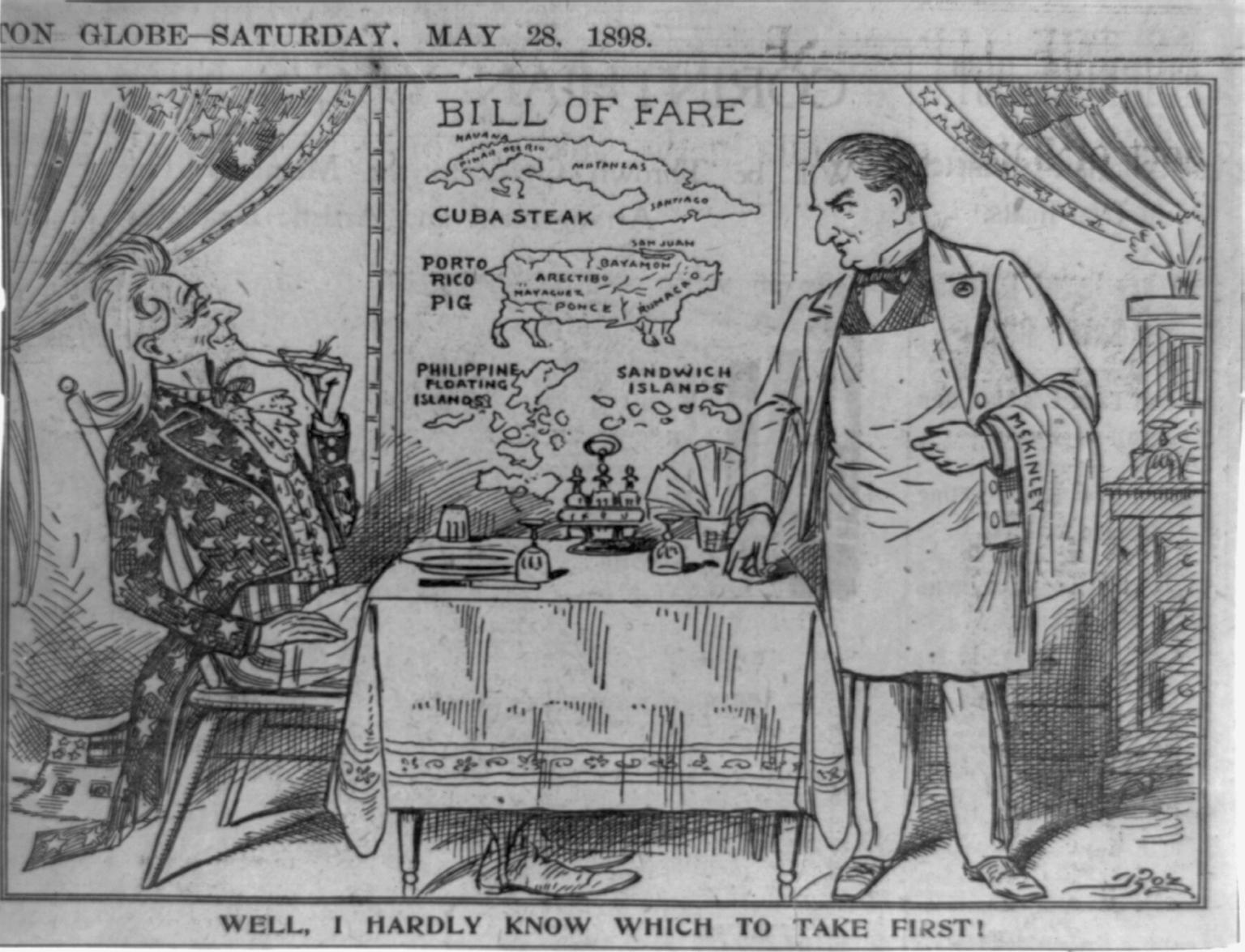
"Well, I hardly know which to take first!" exclaims Uncle Sam in this May 18, 1898, editorial cartoon celebrating the spoils of victory.

The combat army, led by Major General William Rufus Shafter, sailed from Florida on June 20, landing near Santiago de Cuba two days later. Following a skirmish at Las Guasimas on June 24, Shafter's army engaged the Spanish forces on July 2 in the Battle of San Juan Hill. In an intense day-long battle, the American force was victorious, although both sides suffered heavy casualties. Leonard Wood and Theodore Roosevelt, who had resigned as assistant secretary of the Navy, led the "Rough Riders" into combat. Roosevelt's battlefield exploits would later propel him to the governorship of New York in the fall election of 1898. After the American victory at San Juan Hill, the Spanish Caribbean squadron, which had been sheltering in Santiago's harbor, broke for the open sea. The Spanish fleet was intercepted and destroyed by Rear Admiral William T. Sampson's North Atlantic Squadron in the Battle of Santiago de Cuba, the largest naval battle of the war. Shafter laid siege to the city of Santiago, which surrendered on July 17, placing Cuba under effective American control. McKinley and Miles also ordered an invasion of Puerto Rico, which met little resistance when it landed in July. The distance from Spain and the destruction of the Spanish navy made resupply impossible, and the Spanish government—its honor intact after losing to a much more powerful army and navy—began to look for a way to end the war.

==== Peace treaty ====
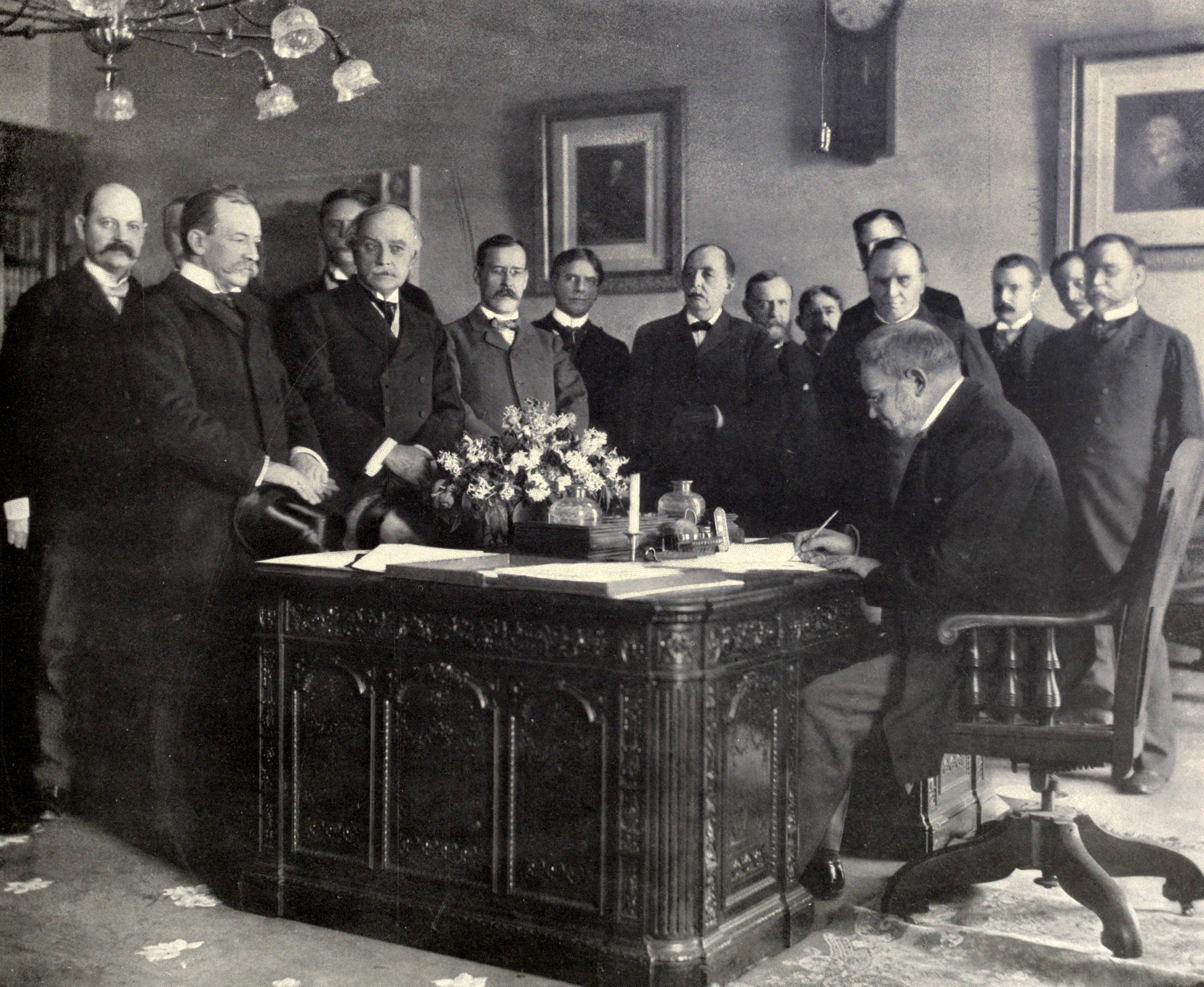
Signing of the Treaty of Paris

On July 22, the Spanish authorized Jules Cambon, the French Ambassador to the United States, to represent Spain in negotiating peace. The Spanish initially wished to restrict their territorial loss to Cuba, but were quickly forced to recognize that their other possessions would be claimed as spoils of war. McKinley's Cabinet unanimously agreed that Spain must leave Cuba and Puerto Rico, but they disagreed on the Philippines, with some wishing to annex the entire archipelago and some wishing only to retain a naval base in the area. Although public sentiment mostly favored annexation of the Philippines, prominent Democrats like Bryan and Grover Cleveland, along with some intellectuals and older Republicans, opposed annexation. These annexation opponents formed the American Anti-Imperialist League. McKinley ultimately decided he had no choice but to annex the Philippines, because he believed Japan would take control of them if the U.S. did not.

McKinley proposed to open negotiations with Spain on the basis of Cuban liberation and Puerto Rican annexation, with the final status of the Philippines subject to further discussion. He stood firmly in that demand even as the military situation on Cuba began to deteriorate when the American army was struck with yellow fever. Spain ultimately agreed to a ceasefire on those terms on August 12, and treaty negotiations began in Paris in September 1898. The talks continued until December 18, when the Treaty of Paris was signed. The United States acquired Puerto Rico and the Philippines as well as the island of Guam, and Spain relinquished its claims to Cuba; in exchange, the United States agreed to pay Spain $20 million. McKinley had difficulty convincing the Senate to approve the treaty by the requisite two-thirds vote, but his lobbying, and that of Vice President Hobart, eventually saw success, as the Senate voted to ratify the treaty on February 6, 1899, on a 57 to 27 vote. Though a significant bloc of senators opposed the treaty, they were unable to unite behind an alternative to ratification. Cuba came under temporary American occupation, which gave Army doctors under Walter Reed the chance to implement major medical reforms and eliminate yellow fever.

==== The new American empire ====
Cuba was devastated from the war and from the long insurrection against Spanish rule, and McKinley refused to recognize the Cuban rebels as the official government of the island. Nonetheless, McKinley felt bound by the Teller Amendment, and he established a military government on the island with the intention of ultimately granting Cuba independence. Many Republican leaders, including Roosevelt and possibly McKinley himself, hoped that benevolent American leadership of Cuba would eventually convince the Cubans to voluntarily request annexation after they gained full independence. Even if annexation was not achieved, McKinley wanted to help establish a stable government that could resist European interference and would remain friendly to U.S. interests. With input from the McKinley administration, Congress passed the Platt Amendment, which stipulated conditions for U.S. withdrawal from the island; the conditions allowed for a strong American role despite the promise of withdrawal. Cuba became independent in 1902, but the U.S. would re-occupy the island in 1906.

McKinley also refused to recognize the native Filipino government of Emilio Aguinaldo, and relations between the United States and the Aguinaldo's supporters deteriorated after the conclusion of the Spanish–American War. McKinley believed that Aguinaldo represented just a small minority of the Filipino populace, and that benevolent American rule would lead to a peaceful occupation. In February 1899, Filipino and American forces clashed at the Battle of Manila, marking the start of the Philippine–American War. The fighting in the Philippines engendered increasingly vocal criticism from the domestic anti-imperialist movement, as did the continued deployment of volunteer regiments. Under General Elwell Stephen Otis, U.S. forces destroyed the rebel Filipino army, but Aguinaldo turned to guerrilla tactics. McKinley sent a commission led by William Howard Taft to establish a civilian government, and McKinley later appointed Taft as the civilian governor of the Philippines. The Filipino insurgency subsided with the capture of Aguinaldo in March 1901, and the U.S. maintained control of the islands until the 1946 Treaty of Manila.

After Puerto Rico was devastated by the massive 1899 San Ciriaco hurricane, Secretary of War Root proposed to eliminate all tariff barriers with Puerto Rico. His proposal initiated a serious disagreement between the McKinley administration and Republican leaders in Congress, who were wary of lowering the tariffs on the newly acquired territories. Rather than relying on Democratic votes to pass a no-tariff bill, McKinley compromised with Republican leaders on a bill that cut tariffs on Puerto Rican goods to a fraction of the rates set by the Dingley Tariff. While considering the tariff bill, the Senate also began hearings on a bill to establish a civil government for Puerto Rico, which the Senate passed in a party-line vote. McKinley signed the Foraker Act into law on April 12, 1900. Under the terms of the bill, all revenue collected from the tariff on Puerto Rican goods would be used for Puerto Rico, and the tariff would cease to function once the government of Puerto Rico established its own taxation system. In the 1901 Insular Cases, the Supreme Court upheld the McKinley administration's policies in the territories acquired in the Spanish–American War, including the establishment of Puerto Rico's government.

=== China ===
Even before peace negotiations began with Spain, McKinley asked Congress to set up a commission to examine trade opportunities in Asia and espoused an "Open Door Policy", in which all nations would freely trade with China and none would seek to violate that nation's territorial integrity. Secretary of State Hay circulated notes promoting the Open Door to that effect to the European powers. Great Britain favored the idea, but Russia opposed it; France, Germany, Italy, and Japan agreed in principle, but only if all the other nations signed on.

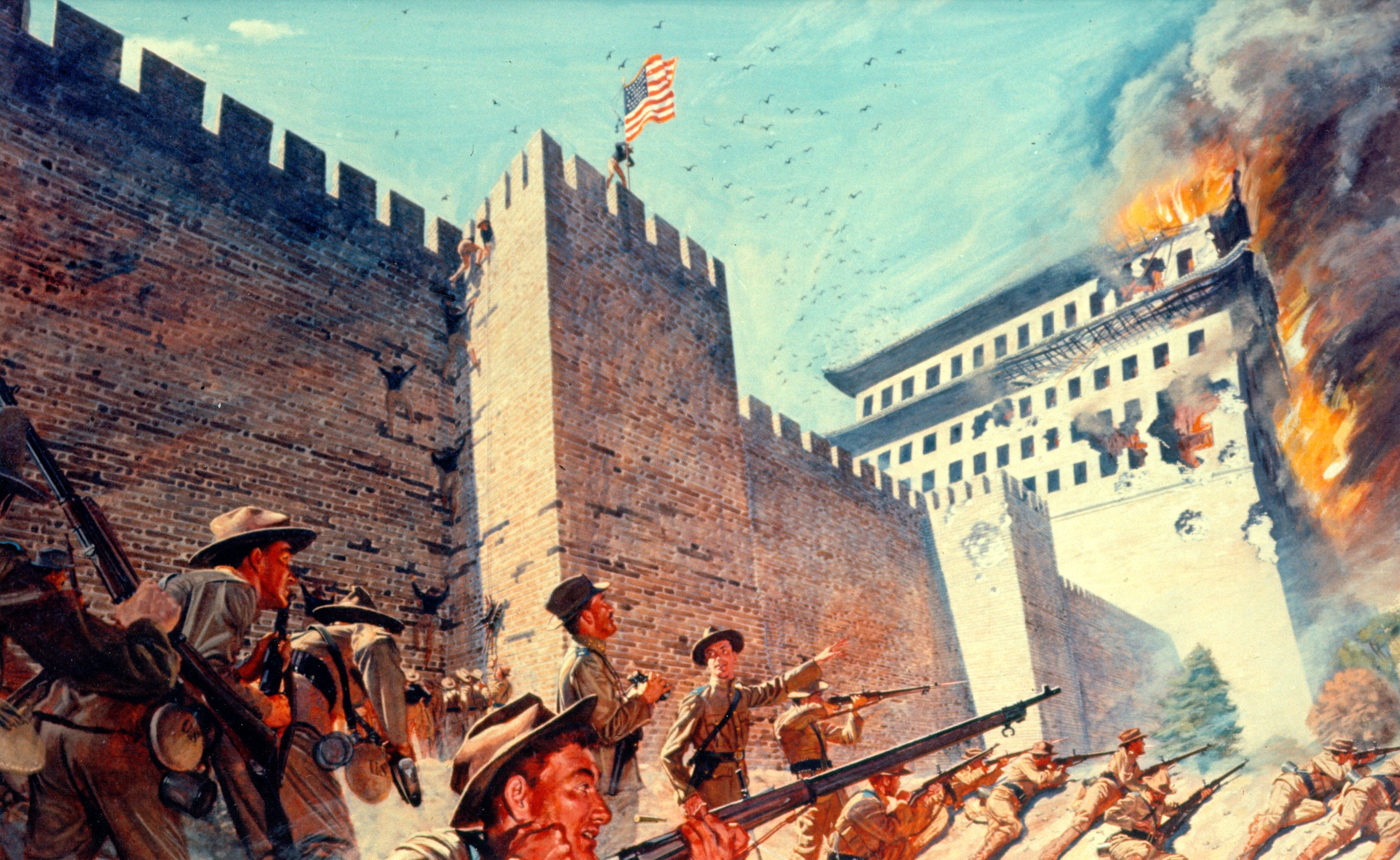
American soldiers scale the walls of Beijing to relieve the Siege of the International Legations, August 1900

American missionaries were threatened and trade with China became imperiled as the Boxer Rebellion of 1900 menaced foreigners and their property in China. Americans and other westerners in Peking were besieged and, in cooperation with other western powers, McKinley ordered 5000 troops to the city in June 1900 in the China Relief Expedition. The westerners were rescued the next month, but several Congressional Democrats objected to McKinley dispatching troops without consulting Congress. McKinley's actions set a precedent that led to most of his successors exerting similar independent control over the military. After the rebellion ended, the United States reaffirmed its commitment to the Open Door policy, which became the basis of American policy toward China. It used the cash reparations paid by China to bring Chinese students to Americans schools.

=== Planning the Panama Canal ===
Secretary of State Hay engaged in negotiations with Britain over the possible construction of a canal across Central America. The Clayton–Bulwer Treaty, which the two nations had signed in 1850, prohibited either from establishing exclusive control over a canal there. The Spanish–American War had exposed the difficulty of maintaining a two-ocean navy without a connection closer than Cape Horn, at the southern tip of South America. With American business, humanitarian and military interests even more involved in Asia following the Spanish–American War, a canal seemed more essential than ever, and McKinley pressed for a renegotiation of the treaty. The British, who were distracted by the ongoing Second Boer War, agreed to negotiate a new treaty. Hay and the British ambassador, Julian Pauncefote, agreed that the United States could control a future canal, provided that it was open to all shipping and not fortified. McKinley was satisfied with the terms, but the Senate rejected them, demanding that the United States be allowed to fortify the canal. Hay was embarrassed by the rebuff and offered his resignation, but McKinley refused it and ordered him to continue negotiations to achieve the Senate's demands. He was successful, and a new treaty was drafted and approved, but not before McKinley's assassination in 1901. McKinley also appointed the Isthmian Canal Commission, which would eventually play a large role in selecting Panama over Nicaragua as the site of the Central American canal. The Panama Canal would eventually be completed in 1914.

== Election of 1900 ==
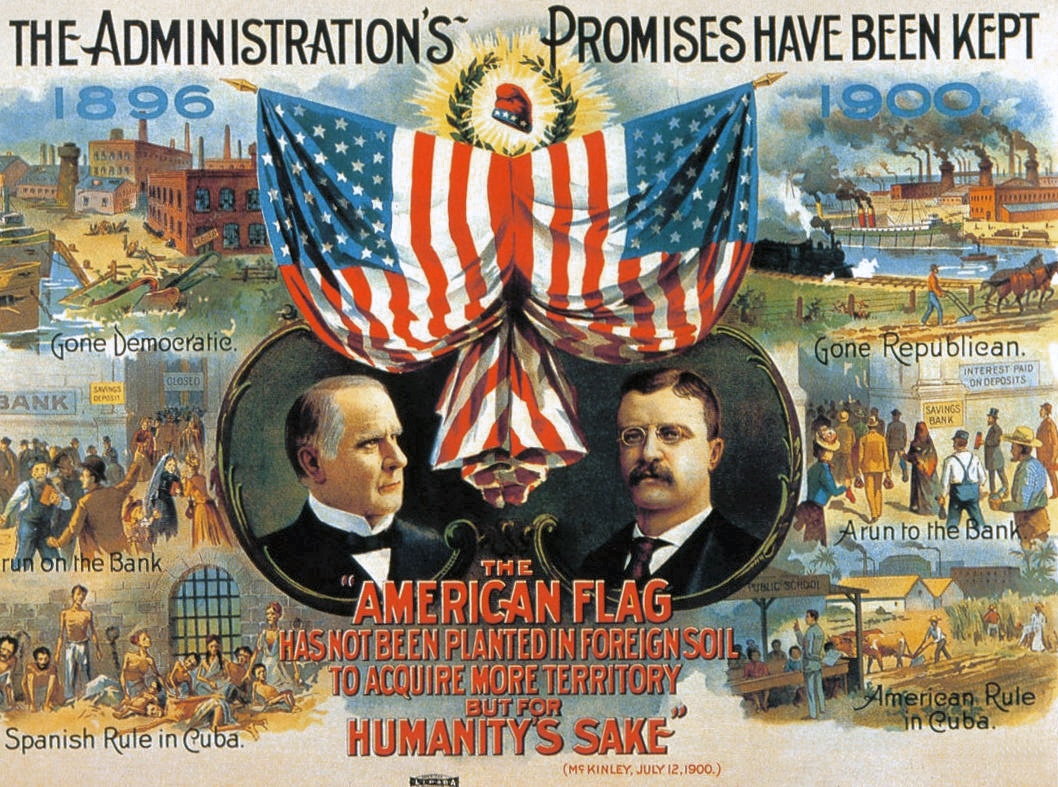
McKinley ran on his record of prosperity and victory in 1900, defeating Bryan by a comfortable margin.

Republicans were generally successful in state and local elections around the country in 1899, making McKinley optimistic about his chances at re-election heading into 1900. With McKinley widely popular in the Republican Party, his renomination at the 1900 Republican National Convention was assured, but the identity of his running mate was unclear due to the death of Vice President Hobart in 1899. The president personally favored Secretary of War Elihu Root or former Secretary of the Interior Cornelius Newton Bliss for the position, while Governor Theodore Roosevelt, Secretary of the Navy John Long, Seth Low, Ambassador Andrew Dickson White, Senator William Allison, and Representative Jonathan P. Dolliver of Iowa also stood out as potential running mates.

When the convention began in Philadelphia in June 1900, none of the potential running mates had overwhelming support, but Roosevelt had the broadest range of support from around the country. McKinley remained uncommitted in public, but Hanna was firmly opposed to the New York governor. Hanna's stance was undermined by the efforts of political boss and New York Senator Thomas Platt, who, disliking Roosevelt's reform agenda, sought to sideline the governor by making him vice president. On June 21, McKinley was unanimously renominated and, with Hanna's reluctant acquiescence, Roosevelt was nominated for vice president on the first ballot. The Democratic convention convened the next month in Kansas City and nominated William Jennings Bryan, setting up a rematch of the 1896 contest.

1900 electoral vote results

The candidates were the same, but the issues of the campaign had shifted: free silver was still a question that animated many voters, but the Republicans focused on victory in war and prosperity at home as issues they believed favored their party. Democrats knew the war had been popular, even if the imperialism issue was less sure, so they focused on the issue of trusts and corporate power, painting McKinley as the servant of capital and big business. As in 1896, Bryan embarked on a speaking tour around the country while McKinley stayed at home. Bryan's campaign to unseat McKinley faced several challenges, including the general prosperity of the country and factionalism within the Democratic Party. Roosevelt emerged as the Republican campaign's primary speaker and Hanna helped the cause by settling a coal miners' strike in Pennsylvania.

Bryan's campaigning failed to excite the voters as it had in 1896, and observers expected McKinley to be re-elected easily. On November 6, 1900, McKinley won the largest victory for any Republican since 1872. Bryan carried only four states outside the Solid South, and even lost his home state of Nebraska. The reasons for the turnabout in Nebraska included prosperity, the collapse of the Populist Party, the intensive Republican campaign in the state, and Bryan's neglect of his base. Nationwide, turnout fell from 78.3 percent to 71.6 percent. In the concurrent congressional elections, Republicans kept control of both houses of Congress.

== Assassination ==
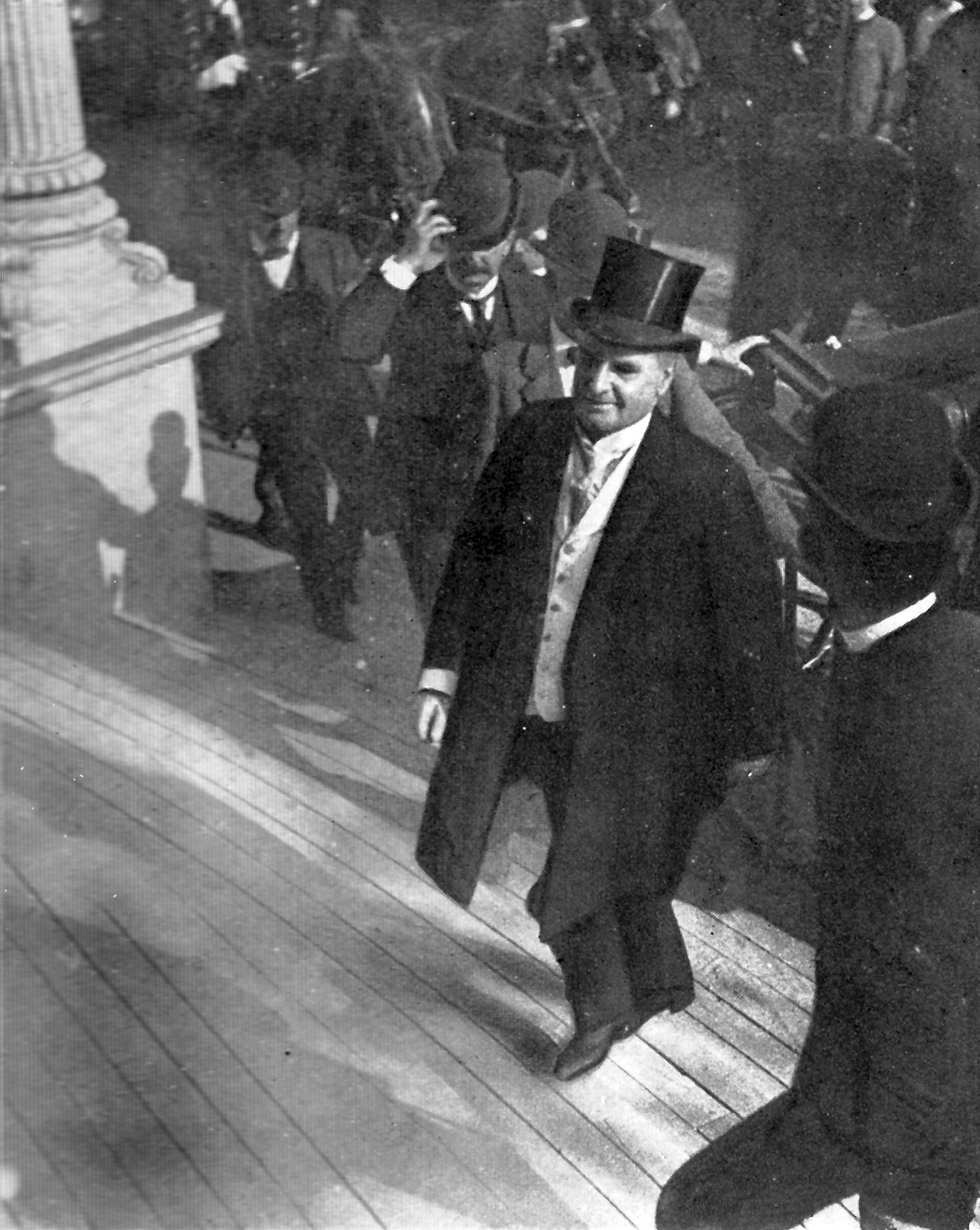
McKinley entering the Temple of Music on September 6, 1901.

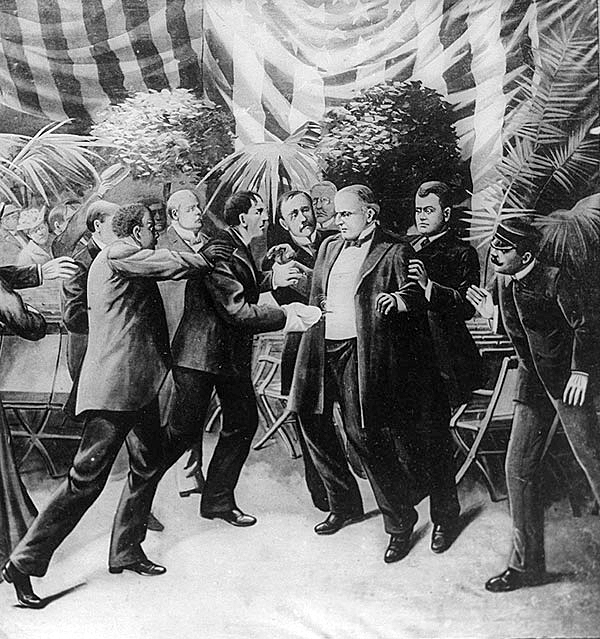
Artist's conception of the shooting of McKinley

The president's personal secretary, George Cortelyou, became concerned with the president's security after several assassinations by anarchists in Europe, including the assassination of King Umberto I of Italy in 1900. Cortelyou twice tried to remove a public reception from the president's visit to the Pan-American Exposition in Buffalo, New York in September 1901, but McKinley refused to cancel the appearance, as he enjoyed meeting with the public. On September 5, the president delivered his address at the Pan-American Exposition before a crowd of some 50,000 people. In the speech, which indicated McKinley's second term plans, the president urged reciprocity treaties with other nations to assure American manufacturers access to foreign markets. After the speech, McKinley shook hands with a long line of visitors, which included anarchist Leon Czolgosz. Inspired by a speech delivered by Emma Goldman, Czolgosz had come to the exposition with the intention of assassinating McKinley. Czolgosz concealed a gun in his handkerchief, and, when he reached the head of the line, shot McKinley twice in the abdomen. McKinley was taken to the exposition aid station, where the doctor was unable to locate the second bullet.

In the days after the shooting McKinley appeared to improve, and doctors issued increasingly optimistic bulletins. Members of the Cabinet, who had rushed to Buffalo on hearing the news, dispersed; Vice President Roosevelt departed on a camping trip to the Adirondacks. However, unknown to the doctors, the gangrene that would kill McKinley was growing on the walls of his stomach, slowly poisoning his blood. On the morning of September 13, McKinley took a turn for the worse, and at 2:15 a.m. on September 14, President McKinley died. Theodore Roosevelt had rushed back and took the oath of office as president in Buffalo. Czolgosz, put on trial for murder nine days after McKinley's death, was found guilty and executed by electric chair on October 29, 1901.

Gould reports, "the nation experienced a wave of genuine grief at the news of McKinley's passing." The stock market, faced with sudden uncertainty, suffered a steep decline—almost unnoticed in the mourning. The nation focused its attention on the casket that made its way by train, first to Washington, where it lay in state in the Capitol, and then to McKinley's hometown of Canton. A hundred thousand people passed by the open casket in the Capitol Rotunda, many having waited hours in the rain; in Canton, an equal number did the same at the Stark County Courthouse on September 18. The following day, a funeral service was held at the First Methodist Church; the casket was then sealed and taken to the McKinley house, where relatives paid their final respects. It was then transported to the receiving vault at West Lawn Cemetery in Canton, to await the construction of the memorial to McKinley that was already being planned.

== Historical reputation ==
McKinley Tomb and Memorial, Canton, Ohio - DPLA

Mc. Kinley Monument (13904281308)

A political campaign token issued by the William McKinley and Garret Hobart Jugate Political Campaign in the (Gregorian) year 1896.

McKinley's biographer, H. Wayne Morgan remarks that McKinley died the most beloved president in history. However, the young, enthusiastic Roosevelt quickly captured public attention after his predecessor's death. The new president made little effort to secure the trade reciprocity McKinley had intended to negotiate with other nations. Controversy and public interest surrounded Roosevelt throughout the seven and a half years of his presidency as memories of McKinley faded; by 1920, according to Gould, McKinley's administration was deemed no more than "a mediocre prelude to the vigor and energy of Theodore Roosevelt's". Beginning in the 1950s, McKinley received more favorable evaluations; nevertheless, in surveys ranking American presidents, he has generally been placed near the middle, often trailing contemporaries such as Hayes and Cleveland. A 2018 poll of the American Political Science Association’s Presidents and Executive Politics section ranked McKinley as the 22nd best president, while a 2017 C-SPAN poll of historians ranked McKinley as the 16th best president. Morgan suggests that this relatively low ranking is due to a perception among historians that while many decisions during McKinley's presidency profoundly affected the nation's future, he more followed public opinion than led it, and that McKinley's standing has suffered from altered public expectations of the presidency.

There has been broad agreement among historians that McKinley's election was at the time of a transition between two political eras, dubbed the Third and Fourth Party Systems. Kenneth F. Warren emphasizes the national commitment to a pro-business, industrial, and modernizing program, represented by McKinley. Historian Daniel P. Klinghard argued that McKinley's personal control of the 1896 campaign gave him the opportunity to reshape the presidency—rather than simply follow the party platform—by representing himself as the voice of the people. However, more recently, as Republican political official Karl Rove exalted McKinley as the agent of sweeping political realignment in the 2000s, some scholars, such as David Mayhew, questioned whether the 1896 election truly represented a realignment, thereby placing in issue whether McKinley deserves credit for it. Historian Michael J. Korzi argued in 2005 that while it is tempting to see McKinley as the key figure in the transition from congressional domination of government to the modern, powerful president, this change was an incremental process through the late 19th and early 20th centuries.

A controversial aspect of McKinley's presidency is territorial expansion and imperialism. The U.S. set Cuba free and granted independence to the Philippines in 1946. Puerto Rico remains in an ambiguous status. Hawaii is a state; Guam remains a territory. The territorial expansion of 1898 was the high water mark of American imperialism. Morgan sees that historical discussion as a subset of the debate over the rise of America as a world power; he expects the debate over McKinley's actions to continue indefinitely without resolution, and argues that however one judges McKinley's actions in American expansion, one of his motivations was to change the lives of Filipinos and Cubans for the better.

== See also ==
- United States Military Government of the Philippine Islands
