= James B. Ricaud =

American politician (1808–1866)

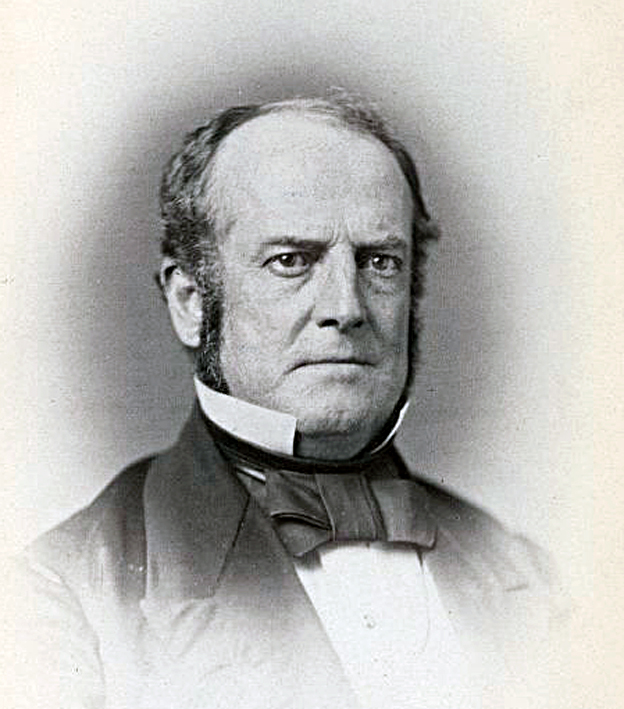
- Ricaud in 1859

Member of the U.S. House of Representatives from Maryland's 2nd district
- In office March 4, 1855 – March 3, 1859
- Preceded by: Jacob Shower
- Succeeded by: Edwin H. Webster

Member of the Maryland Senate from the Kent County district
- In office 1864–1864
- Preceded by: David C. Blackiston
- Succeeded by: Daniel Jones

Member of the Maryland Senate from the Kent County district
- In office 1838–1843
- Preceded by: District started
- Succeeded by: William S. Constable

Member of the Maryland Senate from the Eastern Shore district
- In office 1836–1837 Serving with Thomas King Carroll, Joseph S. Cottman, William T. Goldsborough, Edward N. Hambleton, William U. Purnell, Thomas Wright
- Preceded by: Thomas Emory, John C. Groome, William Hughlett, Samuel G. Osborn, Henry Page, Henry P. C. Wilson
- Succeeded by: District ended

Member of the Maryland House of Delegates from the Kent County district
- In office 1834–1834 Serving with James P. Gale, Benjamin Kirby, William Welch
- Preceded by: James P. Gale, William Hayne, Henry Hurt, Michael Miller
- Succeeded by: Benjamin Kirby, William S. Lassell, Merritt Miller, James S. Primrose

Personal details
- Born: James Barroll Ricaud; February 11, 1808 Baltimore, Maryland, U.S.
- Died: January 24, 1866 (aged 57) Chestertown, Maryland, U.S.
- Resting place: St. Paul's Church Cemetery
- Party: Whig; Know Nothing
- Spouse(s): Anne Elizabeth Gordon (m. 1831) Cornelia C. Worrell (m. 1845)
- Children: 1
- Education: Washington College
- Occupation: Politician; lawyer; judge

James Barroll Ricaud (February 11, 1808 – January 24, 1866) was an American politician. He served as a member of the Maryland House of Delegates and Maryland Senate in the mid-19th century. He represented Maryland's 2nd district in the U.S. House of Representatives from 1855 to 1859. He was later appointed as an associate judge in Maryland.

== Early life ==
James Barroll Ricaud was born on February 11, 1808, in Baltimore, Maryland, to Rachel (née Miller) Hyatt and Benjamin Ricaud. He attended common schools and graduated from Washington College in 1828. He studied law and was admitted to the bar in 1829.

== Career ==
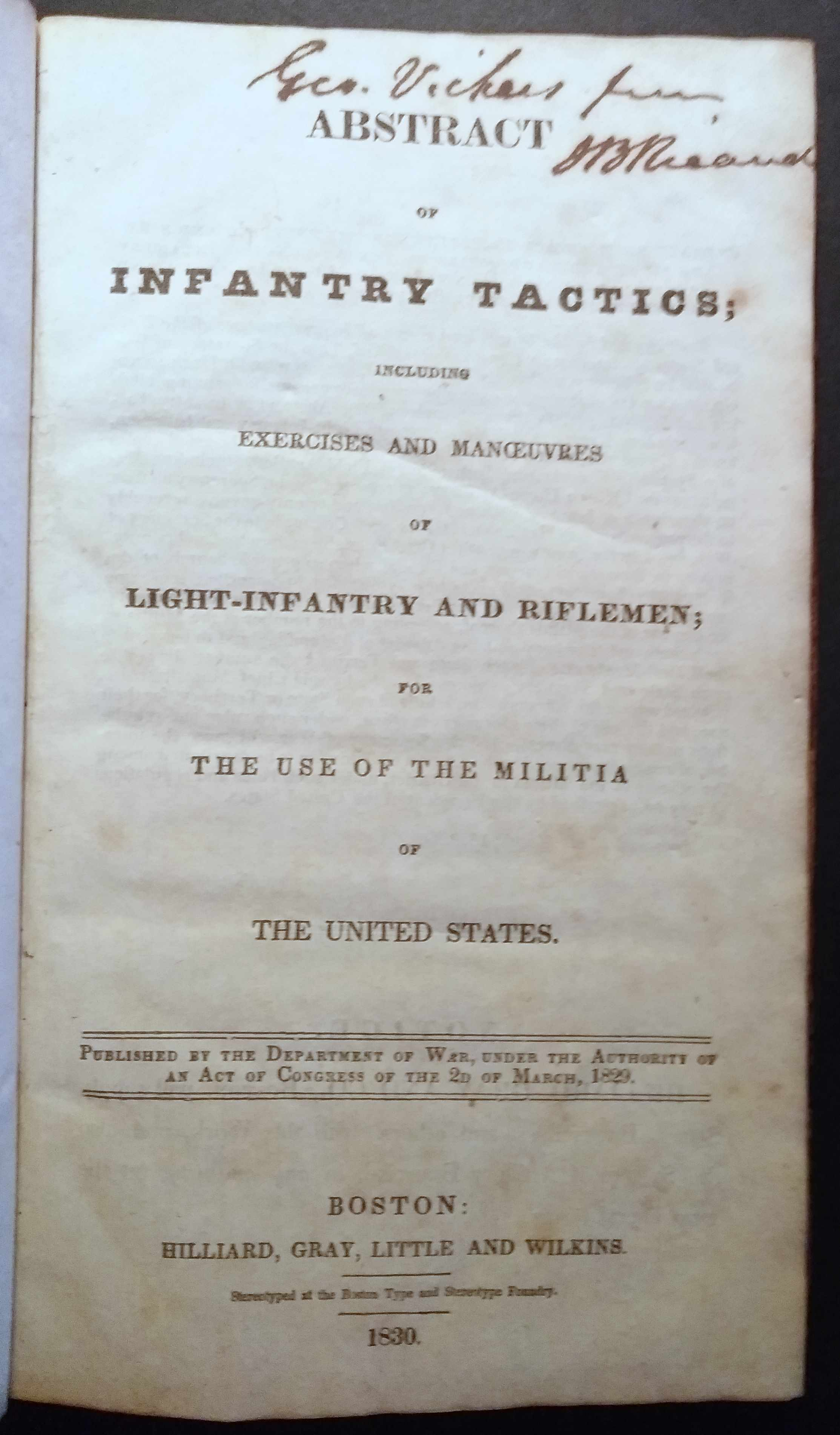
Title page from Abstract of Infantry Tactics including exercises and maneuvers of light infantry and riflemen for the use of the militia of the United States Published by the Department of War Under the authority of an Act of Congress of the 2D of March, 1829. This first edition was signed by James B. Ricaud and given to George Vickers who would later be a U.S. Senator from Maryland. In the private collection of H. Blair Howell

Ricaud commenced a law practice in Chestertown.

Ricaud served as a member of the Maryland House of Delegates, representing Kent County in 1834. He served in the Maryland State Senate, representing the Eastern Shore from 1836 to 1837 and serving as president pro tempore. He represented Kent County in the senate from 1834 to 1843 and in 1864. He served as presidential elector on two Whig tickets in the 1830s and 1840s. In 1850, he was a delegate to the Maryland constitutional convention. Ricaud was elected as the candidate of the American Party to the Thirty-fourth and Thirty-fifth Congresses, representing the 2nd district, serving from March 4, 1855, to March 3, 1859. He served on the manufacturing committee and was involved in the investigation of the accounts of clerk William Cullom. He later resumed the practice of his profession and was appointed associate judge of the 7th Maryland judicial district in 1864 by Governor Augustus Bradford and served until 1866.

== Personal life ==
Ricaud married Anne Elizabeth Gordon on November 29, 1831. He married Cornelia C. Worrell on December 9, 1845. He had one daughter, Mary Rebecca. He was an Episcopalian.

Ricaud died on January 24, 1866, at his home in Chestertown. He is interred in St. Paul's Church Cemetery in Chestertown.

U.S. House of Representatives
Preceded by Jacob Shower	Member of the U.S. House of Representatives from Maryland's 2nd congressional district 1855–1859	Succeeded by Edwin Hanson Webster
