= Thomas Yates Walsh =

American politician

Member of the U.S. House of Representatives from Maryland's 4th district
- In office March 4, 1851 – March 3, 1853
- Preceded by: Robert Milligan McLane
- Succeeded by: William Thomas Hamilton

Personal details
- Born: 1809 Baltimore Maryland, U.S.
- Died: January 20, 1865 (aged 55–56) Baltimore, Maryland, U.S.
- Resting place: St. Paul's Protestant Episcopal Cemetery
- Party: Whig Party

Thomas Yates Walsh (1809 – January 20, 1865) was a U.S. representative from Maryland.

Born in Baltimore, Maryland, Walsh completed preparatory studies and attended St. Mary's College at Baltimore (1821–1824). He studied law, was admitted to the bar on July 30, 1832, and commenced practice in Baltimore. He served as member of the city council in 1847 and 1848.

Walsh was elected as a Whig to the Thirty-second Congress (March 4, 1851 – March 3, 1853). He was an unsuccessful candidate for reelection in 1852 to the Thirty-third Congress, and resumed the practice of law. He died in Baltimore, Maryland, and is interred in St. Paul's Protestant Episcopal Cemetery.

U.S. House of Representatives
| Preceded by Robert Milligan McLane | Member of the U.S. House of Representatives from Maryland's 4th congressional district 1851-1853 | Succeeded by William Thomas Hamilton |
