= Charles Emory Smith =

American politician (1842–1908)

Charles Smith
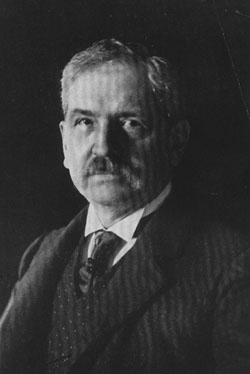

39th United States Postmaster General
- In office April 21, 1898 – January 8, 1902
- President: William McKinley; Theodore Roosevelt
- Preceded by: James Albert Gary
- Succeeded by: Henry Clay Payne

United States Minister to Russia
- In office May 14, 1890 – April 17, 1892
- President: Benjamin Harrison
- Preceded by: C. Allen Thorndike Rice
- Succeeded by: Andrew Dickson White

Personal details
- Born: Charles Emory Smith; February 18, 1842 Mansfield, Connecticut, U.S.
- Died: January 19, 1908 (aged 65) Philadelphia, Pennsylvania, U.S.
- Party: Republican
- Education: Union College (BA)

Charles Emory Smith (February 18, 1842 – January 19, 1908) was an American journalist and political leader.

== Early life ==
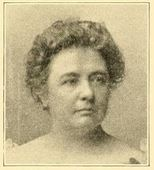
Mrs. Charles Emory Smith

Charles Emory Smith was born in Mansfield, Connecticut on February 18, 1842. In 1849 his family removed to Albany, New York, where he attended the public schools and The Albany Academy. He graduated from Union College in 1861, was a recruiting officer on the staff of Brigadier General John F. Rathbone (1819–1901) in 1861-1862, taught in the Albany Academy in 1862-1865, and was editor of the Albany Express in 1865-1870. He joined the staff of the Albany Journal in 1870, and was editor-in-chief of this paper from 1876 to 1880. In 1879-1880 he was a regent of the University of the State of New York. From 1880 until his death he was editor and part proprietor of the Philadelphia Press.

== Career ==
He was active as a Republican in state and national politics; was chairman of the Committee on Resolutions of the New York State Republican Conventions from 1874 to 1880 (excepting 1877), and was president of the convention of 1879; and was a delegate to several Republican National Conventions, drafting much of the Republican platforms of 1876 and 1896.

In 1890 to 1892 he was United States minister to Russia, and during that period had charge of distributing among the Russian famine sufferers five shiploads of food and other supplies, valued at an estimated $750,000. In November 1892, he gave a speech "addressing the problem of immigration" to the Patria Club. He expressed concern over the changing trends in immigration to the United States, and specifically called for the acceptance of Anglo-Saxon immigrants over Slavic immigrants.

He was Postmaster General in the cabinet of Presidents McKinley and Roosevelt from April 1898 until January 1902, and did much to develop the rural free delivery system.

He died at his home in Philadelphia on January 19, 1908. He is buried at West Laurel Hill Cemetery in Bala Cynwyd.

== Notes ==
Political offices
Preceded by James A. Gary	United States Postmaster General; Served under: William McKinley, Theodore Roosevelt; April 21, 1898 – January 8, 1902	Succeeded by Henry C. Payne
Diplomatic posts
Preceded by C. Allen Thorndike Rice	United States Minister to Russia; February 14, 1890 – April 17, 1892	Succeeded by Andrew D. White
