= Summit (Catonsville, Maryland) =

Historic house in Maryland, United States

- U.S. National Register of Historic Places
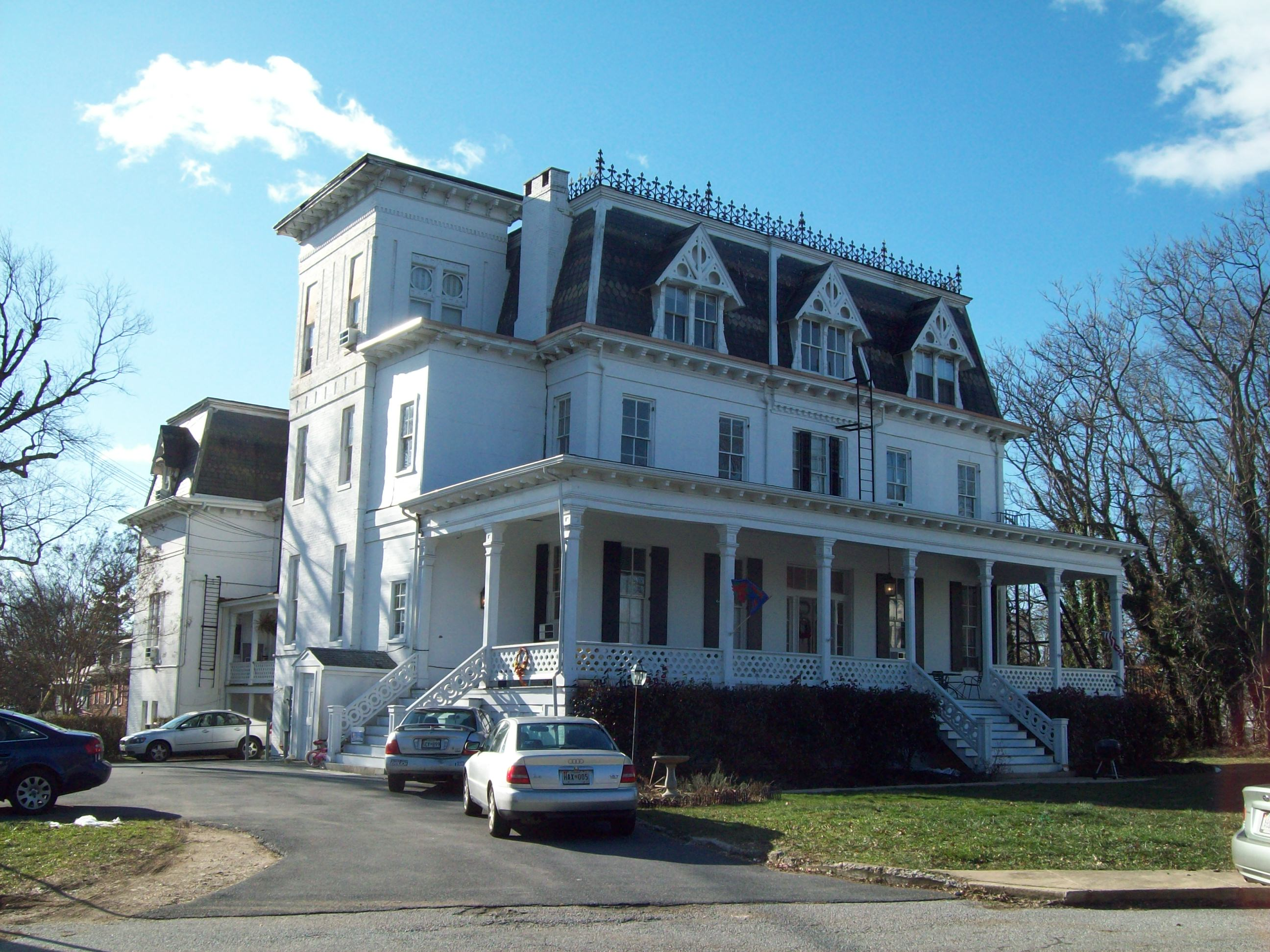
- Summit, Catonsville MD, December 2009

- Location within Maryland Location within the United States
- Location: 10 Stanley Dr., Catonsville, Maryland
- Coordinates: 39°16′5.4″N 76°44′33.2″W
- Area: 1.5 acres (0.61 ha)
- Built: 1854
- Architects: Koefoed, Charles J.
- Architectural style: Second Empire, Italianate
- NRHP reference No.: 79001114
- Added to NRHP: July 24, 1979

Summit is a historic home located in Catonsville, Baltimore County, Maryland. It a large brick house, once part of a country estate owned by James Albert Gary. It features a three-story Italianate tower and large wing extending to the rear. The main façade is three stories and five bays wide, with the tower located on the east side. A one-story porch with square columns and railings runs across the full façade. The mansion was built originally as a summer home and later converted to apartments after its sale to the Summit Park Company in 1919.

It was added to the National Register of Historic Places in 1979.
