= William T. Hamilton =

American politician (1820-1888)

William Thomas Hamilton
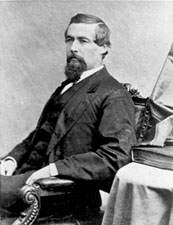

38th Governor of Maryland
- In office January 14, 1880 – January 9, 1884
- Preceded by: John L. Carroll
- Succeeded by: Robert M. McLane

United States Senator from Maryland
- In office March 4, 1869 – March 3, 1875
- Preceded by: William P. Whyte
- Succeeded by: William P. Whyte

Member of the U.S. House of Representatives from Maryland
- In office March 4, 1849 – March 3, 1855
- Preceded by: James D. Roman (2nd); Thomas Y. Walsh (4th)
- Succeeded by: Jacob Shower (2nd); Henry W. Davis (4th)
- Constituency: 2nd district (1849-53); 4th district (1853-55)

Maryland House of Delegates
- In office 1846–1849

Personal details
- Born: September 8, 1820 Boonsboro, Maryland, US
- Died: October 26, 1888 (aged 68) Hagerstown, Maryland, US
- Party: Democratic
- Spouse: Clara Holmes Jenness Hamilton
- Children: Eight

William Thomas Hamilton (September 8, 1820 – October 26, 1888) was an American politician who served as the 38th governor of Maryland in the United States from 1880 to 1884. He also served in the United States Senate, representing the State of Maryland, from 1868 to 1874, and in the House of Representatives, representing the second district (1849–1853) and fourth district (1853–1855) of Maryland.

He was a member of the Democratic Party.

== Early life and politics ==
Hamilton was born in Boonsboro, Maryland, and received early schooling from a local tutor named John Brown. He went on to attend Hagerstown Academy, and later Jefferson College in Canonsburg, Pennsylvania, from 1836 to 1840. After college, Hamilton studied law with former Maryland Congressman John Thomson Mason, Jr., and was admitted to the bar in 1845. He then commenced law practice in Hagerstown, Maryland.

In 1846, Hamilton was elected to the Maryland House of Delegates, but failed to win re-election in 1847. He was, however, elected as a Democrat to the Thirty-first, Thirty-second, and Thirty-third Congresses, serving from March 4, 1849 – March 3, 1855. While Hamilton was in Congress, even though his district was largely manufacturers and miners, he supported tariffs but only as a source of revenue for the government. Other actions while in Congress included his tenure as chairman of the Committee on the District of Columbia during the Thirty-third Congress.

From 1855 until 1868, Hamilton avoided politics and resumed the practice of law and farming in Hagerstown. During that time, he became widely known throughout Western Maryland as an excellent trial lawyer.

William Hamilton owned slaves and had a slaves quarters in his home in Hagerstown, Maryland.

== United States Senate ==
After his long absence from politics, Hamilton was elected as a Democrat to the United States Senate by the General Assembly, and served from March 4, 1869, to March 3, 1875. Hamilton was a strong supporter of restoring southern sovereignty following the American Civil War, and voted against the Fifteenth Amendment to the United States Constitution which granted voting rights to all men regardless of race.

In 1871, Hamilton endorsed William Pinkney Whyte during the Maryland governor campaign, but regretted the decision thereafter following Whyte's actions as governor. In 1874, Hamilton was abandoned by the state Democratic Party during the nomination process for his senate seat, and was not considered by them for re-election. Instead, Hamilton ran for governor in 1875, but lost his party's nomination to fellow Democrat John Lee Carroll.

== Governor of Maryland ==
After failing to receive nomination for governor, Hamilton again stepped away from the political arena, returning to his previous engagements in Western Maryland. During that time, however, he continued to push persistently for a Democratic nomination as governor of Maryland, which he succeeding in doing in 1879. Hamilton faced future U.S. Postmaster General, Republican James Albert Gary, during the election, and defeated him by more than 22,000 votes.

As governor, Hamilton regularly conflicted with the state legislature, believing they were neglecting the state's economy. He sought to reduce government waste by abolishing excessive offices and positions, such as the office of Weighers of Grain and Hay, but again the legislature refused to cooperate with his program. He retired as governor on January 8, 1884, retaining popular support throughout the state. His hostile treatment of the legislature as governor, however, had made the state Democratic party again unreceptive towards him.

Hamilton returned to Hagerstown where he avoided further involvement in state and national politics. He returned to the practice of law, but also worked to improve the city and county public works, streets, and water supply. He was maintained a great deal of popularity in Hagerstown and the surrounding areas, and his death following a long battle with illness was widely mourned. He is buried in Rose Hill Cemetery (Maryland).

== Family ==
Hamilton's daughter Josephine married the inventor Hiram Percy Maxim. His other daughter Clare married Hayden Eames, brother of the opera singer Emma Eames. His granddaughter was actress Clare Eames, his great-granddaughter is actress Jennifer Howard, and his great-great-grandson is actor Tony Goldwyn.

Party political offices
| Preceded by John Lee Carroll | Democratic nominee for Governor of Maryland; 1879 | Succeeded by Robert Milligan McLane |
U.S. House of Representatives
| Preceded by James D. Roman | Member of the U.S. House of Representatives from Maryland's 2nd congressional district 1849–1853 | Succeeded by Jacob Shower |
| Preceded by Thomas Yates Walsh | Member of the U.S. House of Representatives from Maryland's 4th congressional district 1853–1855 | Succeeded by Henry Winter Davis |
U.S. Senate
| Preceded by William Pinkney Whyte | U.S. senator (Class 1) from Maryland; 1869–1875; Served alongside: George Vickers, George R. Dennis | Succeeded by William P. Whyte |
Political offices
| Preceded by John Lee Carroll | Governor of Maryland; 1880–1884 | Succeeded by Robert Milligan McLane |
