= Jacob Shower =

American politician (1803–1879)

Member of the U.S. House of Representatives from Maryland's 2nd district
- In office March 4, 1853 – March 3, 1855
- Preceded by: William T. Hamilton
- Succeeded by: James B. Ricaud

Member of the Maryland House of Delegates
- In office 1834–1840

Personal details
- Born: February 22, 1803 Manchester, Maryland, U.S.
- Died: May 25, 1879 (aged 76) Manchester, Maryland, U.S.
- Party: Democratic
- Occupation: Politician, physician

Military service
- Allegiance: United States
- Battles/wars: War of 1812

Jacob Shower (February 22, 1803 – May 25, 1879) was an American politician.

Born in Manchester, Maryland, Shower was a drummer in the War of 1812 and attended private schools at Emmitsburg, Maryland. He graduated from the medical department of the University of Maryland at Baltimore in 1825 and commenced the practice of his profession in Carroll County, Maryland.

Shower was a charter member of the first Andrew Jackson Club in the State in 1824. He was a Democratic member of the Maryland House of Delegates from 1834 to 1840, clerk of the circuit court of Carroll County from 1842 to 1850, and delegate to the State constitutional convention in 1851. He was elected as a Democrat to the Thirty-third Congress, serving from March 4, 1853, to March 3, 1855. After Congress, he resumed medical practice, and died in Manchester, Maryland.

U.S. House of Representatives
Preceded by William Thomas Hamilton	Member of the U.S. House of Representatives from Maryland's 2nd congressional district 1853–1855	Succeeded by James Barroll Ricaud
