= Dingley Act =

Historical United States tariff

- Other short titles: Dingley Tariff · Tariff of 1897
- Long title: An Act To provide revenue for the Government and to encourage the industries of the United States.
- Enacted by: the 55th United States Congress
- Effective: July 24, 1897

Citations
- Statutes at Large: 30 Stat. 151

Codification
- Acts amended: Wilson–Gorman Tariff Act (1894)

Legislative history
- Introduced in the House as H.R. 379 by R‑ME Nelson Dingley Jr.th on March 18, 1897; Committee consideration by House Committee on Ways and Means · Senate Committee on Finance; Passed the House on March 31, 1897 (205–122); Passed the Senate on July 7, 1897 (38–28); Reported by the joint conference committee on July 1897; agreed to by the House on July 19, 1897 (187–116 (agreed to conference report)) and by the Senate on July 24, 1897 (40–30 (agreed to conference report)); Signed into law by President William McKinley on July 24, 1897

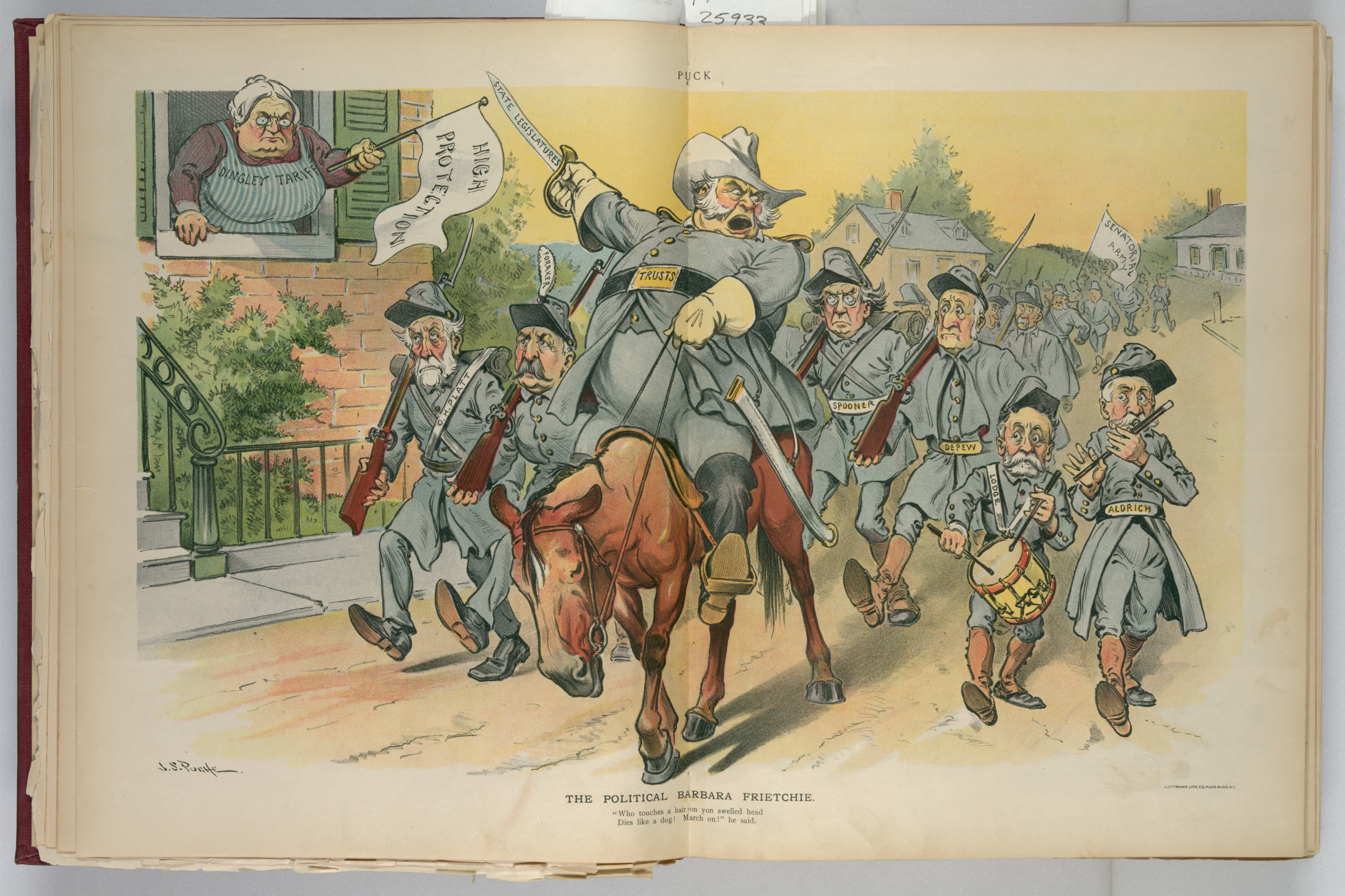
Illustration showing a troop of senators as Confederate soldiers, led by an officer on horseback labeled "Trusts", marching down a street past the house with "Barbara Fritchie" labeled "Dingley Tariff" leaning out the window, waving a flag labeled "High Protection", Puck, February 1905

The 1897 passage of the Dingley Act (ch. 11, 30 Stat. 151, July 24, 1897), introduced by U.S. Representative Nelson Dingley Jr., of Maine, raised tariffs in United States to counteract the Wilson–Gorman Tariff Act of 1894, which had lowered rates. The bill came into effect under the first year of the Presidency of William McKinley. The McKinley administration wanted slowly to bring back the protectionism that was proposed by the McKinley Tariff of 1890.

The Dingley Act was designed to protect American industries from foreign competition, which led to increased domestic steel prices and higher costs for downstream industries like construction and railroads. While it benefited certain domestic producers, it also contributed to inflationary pressures and raised consumer prices, leading to criticism from Democrats who argued it favored large corporations over consumers.

Following the election of 1896, McKinley followed through with his promises for protectionism. Congress imposed duties on wool and hides which had been duty-free since 1872. Rates were increased on woolens, linens, silks, china, and sugar (the tax rates for which doubled). The Dingley Tariff remained in effect for twelve years, making it the longest-lasting tariff in U.S. history. It was also the highest in US history, averaging about 52% in its first year of operation. Over the life of the tariff, the rate averaged at around 47%.

The Dingley Act remained in effect until the Payne–Aldrich Tariff Act of 1909.

== See also ==
- McKinley Tariff
