= 1879 Maryland gubernatorial election =

- November 6, 1879

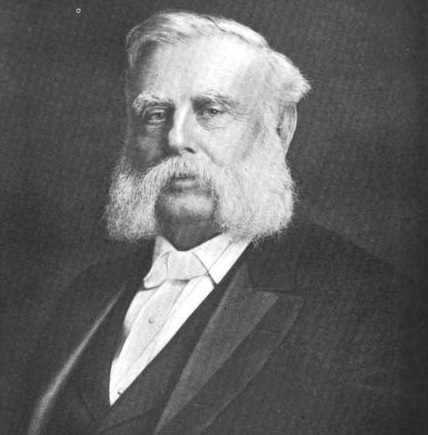
| Nominee | William Thomas Hamilton | James Albert Gary |
| Party | Democratic | Republican |
| Popular vote | 90,771 | 68,609 |
| Percentage | 56.86% | 42.98% |
- County results Hamilton: 50–60% 60–70% Gary: 50–60%
Governor before election
John Lee Carroll
Democratic
Elected Governor
William Thomas Hamilton
Democratic

The 1879 Maryland gubernatorial election took place on November 6, 1879.

Incumbent Democratic Governor John Lee Carroll did not seek re-election.

Democratic candidate William Thomas Hamilton defeated Republican candidate James Albert Gary.

== General election ==
=== Candidates ===
- William Thomas Hamilton, Democratic, former U.S. Senator
- James Albert Gary, Republican, businessman, Republican nominee for Maryland's 5th congressional district in 1870
- Howard Meeks, National Greenback-Labor

=== Results ===
1879 Maryland gubernatorial election (Note: Some sources give the result as Hamilton 90,731, Gary 68,619.)
| Party | Candidate | Votes | % | ±% |
|---|---|---|---|---|
| Democratic | William Thomas Hamilton | 90,771 | 56.86% | |
| Republican | James Albert Gary | 68,609 | 42.98% | |
| Greenback | Howard Meeks | 265 | 0.17% | |
| Majority | | 22,162 | 13.88% | |
| Turnout | | 159,645 | | |
| Democratic hold | | Swing | | |
