= James Albert Gary =

American politician (1833–1920)

James Gary
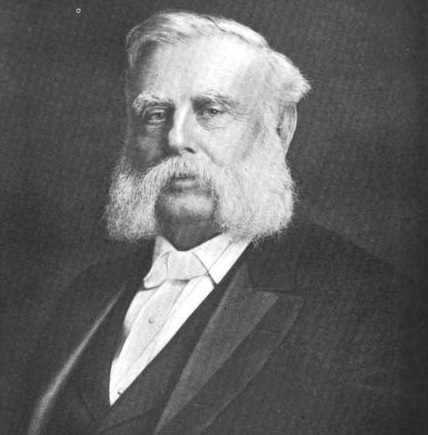
- Gary (c. 1897/1898)

38th United States Postmaster General
- In office March 5, 1897 – April 21, 1898
- President: William McKinley
- Preceded by: William Lyne Wilson
- Succeeded by: Charles Emory Smith

Personal details
- Born: James Albert Gary; October 22, 1833 Uncasville, Connecticut, U.S.
- Died: October 31, 1920 (aged 87) Baltimore, Maryland, U.S.
- Resting place: Loudon Park Cemetery; Baltimore, Maryland, U.S.
- Party: Republican
- Spouse: Lavinia W. Corrie (m. 1856)
- Children: 10
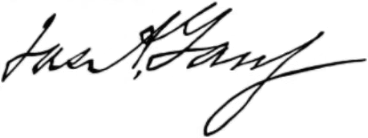
- Signature

James Albert Gary (October 22, 1833 – October 31, 1920) was a U.S. political figure. He was the Republican candidate in the 1879 Maryland gubernatorial election. He served as Postmaster General from 1897 to 1898. His 61-acre summer place in Catonsville, Maryland known as the "Summit", was added in 1979 to the National Register of Historic Places.

== Early life ==
James Albert Gary was born on October 22, 1833, in Uncasville, Connecticut, to Pamelia (née Forrest) and James Sullivan Gary. His father was a well-known manufacturer.

== Career ==
In 1861, Gary joined his father under the firm James S. Gary & Son. After the death of his father in 1870, Gary took over the ownership of his father's company.

In 1858, Gary was nominated for the Maryland Senate under the Republican ticket, but lost. In 1861, he was a delegate to the Union convention held at the Maryland Institute. He was a delegate to the 1872 and the 1876 Republican National Conventions. He would attend the following national conventions until 1896. In 1872, Gary ran for U.S. Congress, but was defeated.

Gary ran as the Republican candidate for Maryland Governor in the 1879 election, losing to William Thomas Hamilton. He served as the Postmaster General from March 5, 1897, to his resignation due to illness on April 21, 1898.

He spent much of his working life in textile manufacture in the Baltimore, Maryland, region, and was involved with cotton mills along the Patapsco and Patuxent Rivers, including Ely, Guilford, and Laurel, Maryland.

Gary served as president of the Merchants and Manufacturers' Association. He was also president of the Citizens' National Bank. Gary was vice president of the Consolidated Gas Company. He was director of the Savings Bank of Baltimore, Baltimore Warehouse Company, American Fire Insurance Company, Merchants and Manufacturers' Insurance Company and the Baltimore Trust and Guaranty Company.

== Personal life ==
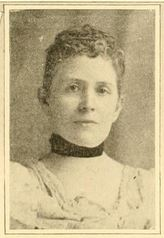
Gary’s wife, Lavinia Washington

Gary married Lavinia W. Corrie in 1856. They had ten children, including E. Stanley, Mrs. Robert C. Taylor, Mrs. Henry Pratt Janes, Mrs. Harold Randolph, Mrs. Eugene Levering Jr., Mrs. Francis E. Pegram, Mrs. Van Lear Black and Mrs. Andrew H. Whitridge. Only eight of his children survived to adulthood.

Gary was a prominent member of Baltimore's prestigious Brown Memorial Presbyterian Church and led the movement to establish Babcock Memorial Church there in memory of Brown Memorial's minister, Maltbie Babcock. He also contributed to the construction of a church in Daniels, MD, which was later named in his honor: Gary Memorial United Methodist Church.

Gary had a home in the Mount Vernon section of Baltimore, and a 61-acre summer place in Catonsville, Maryland known as the "Summit", the later added in 1979 to the National Register of Historic Places, noted for its fine architecture and beauty.

Gary died on October 31, 1920, at his home at Linden Avenue and Dolphin Street in Baltimore. He is interred at Loudon Park Cemetery in Baltimore.

Party political offices
Preceded by James Morrison Harris	Republican nominee for Governor of Maryland; 1879	Succeeded by Hart Holton
Political offices
Preceded by William Wilson	United States Postmaster General; 1897–1898	Succeeded by Charles Emory Smith
