= Henry Hurt =

British knitter

Henry Edward George Hurt MBE (15 August 1935 – 2 August 2023) was a British knitter.

== Biography ==
Henry Hurt was born in 1935 to Leslie and Nina Hurt. He joined the family business in 1953, initially training in traditional hand-frame knitting. His apprenticeship was briefly interrupted by National Service with the Sherwood Foresters. After his father's death in 1956, Hurt took over the company at age 21 during a challenging period for the industry. In the 1960s, he introduced electric knitting machines, enhancing production capabilities while continuing to advocate for the preservation of traditional methods.

Under Hurt’s leadership, GH Hurt & Son supplied retailers including Jaeger, Harrods, and Laura Ashley. Shawls made by GH Hurt were worn by celebrities and members of the British royal family, including a newborn Prince William. The company operates from its original 18th-century seed mill workshop and received the Queen's Award for Enterprise in International Trade. Hurt was appointed a Member of the Order of the British Empire (MBE) in recognition of his contributions.
