= Albany Journal =

Newspaper published in Albany, Oregon

- Type: Weekly newspaper
- Publisher: Albany Print. and Pub. Co.
- Founded: 1864
- Ceased publication: 1866
- Language: American English
- City: Albany, Linn County, Oregon
- Country: United States
- OCLC number: 36035189

The Albany Journal was a short-lived newspaper serving Albany in the U.S. state of Oregon in the 1860s. The Albany Publishing Company founded the paper, which, according to scholar George Turnbull "served the Republican sentiment," on March 12, 1863, but abandoned it after editor William McPherson was elected state printer in 1866, prompting him to move to Salem. Pickett & Co. revived the paper briefly in 1867, but went bankrupt the following year.

The paper was included in the collection of the Oregon State Library.

Some of its contents have been digitized, through a grant obtained by the Linn Genealogical Society.
