= List of former United States representatives (L) =

This is a complete list of former United States representatives whose last names begin with the letter L.

== Number of years and terms the member has served ==
The number of years the representative/delegate has served in Congress indicates the number of terms the representative/delegate has. Note the representative/delegate can also serve non-consecutive terms if the representative/delegate loses election and wins re-election to the House.

- 2 years – 1 or 2 terms
- 4 years – 2 or 3 terms
- 6 years – 3 or 4 terms
- 8 years – 4 or 5 terms
- 10 years – 5 or 6 terms
- 12 years – 6 or 7 terms
- 14 years – 7 or 8 terms
- 16 years – 8 or 9 terms
- 18 years – 9 or 10 terms
- 20 years – 10 or 11 terms
- 22 years – 11 or 12 terms
- 24 years – 12 or 13 terms
- 26 years – 13 or 14 terms
- 28 years – 14 or 15 terms
- 30 years – 15 or 16 terms
- 32 years – 16 or 17 terms
- 34 years – 17 or 18 terms
- 36 years – 18 or 19 terms
- 38 years – 19 or 20 terms
- 40 years – 20 or 21 terms
- 42 years – 21 or 22 terms
- 44 years – 22 or 23 terms
- 46 years – 23 or 24 terms
- 48 years – 24 or 25 terms
- 50 years – 25 or 26 terms
- 52 years – 26 or 27 terms
- 54 years – 27 or 28 terms
- 56 years – 28 or 29 terms
- 58 years – 29 or 30 terms

Name	Term	State/ Territory	Party	Lifespan
Claude L'Engle	1913–1915	Florida	Democratic	1868–1919
Alcée Louis la Branche	1843–1845	Louisiana	Democratic	1806–1861
George A. La Dow	1875	Oregon	Democratic	1826–1875
Charles M. La Follette	1943–1947	Indiana	Republican	1898–1974
Robert M. La Follette	1885–1891	Wisconsin	Republican	1855–1925
William La Follette	1911–1919	Washington	Republican	1860–1934
Fiorello La Guardia	1917–1919; 1923–1925	New York	Republican	1882–1947
Fiorello La Guardia	1925–1927	New York	American Laborite	1882–1947
Fiorello La Guardia	1927–1933	New York	Republican	1882–1947
Emile La Sére	1846–1851	Louisiana	Democratic	1802–1882
Raúl Labrador	2011–2019	Idaho	Republican	1967–present
Edward S. Lacey	1881–1885	Michigan	Republican	1835–1916
John F. Lacey	1889–1891; 1893–1907	Iowa	Republican	1841–1913
Abner Lacock	1811–1813	Pennsylvania	Democratic-Republican	1770–1837
George W. Ladd	1879–1883	Maine	Greenbacker	1818–1892
John LaFalce	1975–2003	New York	Democratic	1939–2025
Daniel F. Lafean	1903–1913; 1915–1917	Pennsylvania	Republican	1861–1922
Walter Lafferty	1911–1915	Oregon	Republican	1875–1964
Polk Laffoon	1885–1889	Kentucky	Democratic	1844–1906
Addison H. Laflin	1865–1871	New York	Republican	1823–1878
John A. Lafore Jr.	1957–1961	Pennsylvania	Republican	1905–1993
Matthew D. Lagan	1887–1889; 1891–1893	Louisiana	Democratic	1829–1901
Robert Lagomarsino	1974–1993	California	Republican	1926–2021
Samuel Lahm	1847–1849	Ohio	Democratic	1812–1876
Ray LaHood	1995–2009	Illinois	Republican	1945–present
William G. Laidlaw	1887–1891	New York	Republican	1840–1908
James Laird	1883–1889	Nebraska	Republican	1849–1889
Melvin Laird	1953–1969	Wisconsin	Republican	1922–2016
William A. Lake	1855–1857	Mississippi	American	1808–1861
Doug LaMalfa	2013–2026	California	Republican	1960–2026
Henry G. Lamar	1829–1833	Georgia	Democratic	1798–1861
J. Robert Lamar	1903–1905; 1907–1909	Missouri	Democratic	1866–1923
John B. Lamar	1843	Georgia	Democratic	1812–1862
Lucius Quintus Cincinnatus Lamar	1857–1860; 1873–1877	Mississippi	Democratic	1825–1893
William Bailey Lamar	1903–1909	Florida	Democratic	1853–1928
Alfred W. Lamb	1853–1855	Missouri	Democratic	1824–1888
Conor Lamb	2018–2023	Pennsylvania	Democratic	1984–present
John Lamb	1897–1913	Virginia	Democratic	1840–1924
John E. Lamb	1883–1885	Indiana	Democratic	1852–1914
John Lambert	1805–1809	New Jersey	Democratic-Republican	1746–1823
William P. Lambertson	1929–1945	Kansas	Republican	1880–1957
Walter Lambeth	1931–1939	North Carolina	Democratic	1896–1961
Doug Lamborn	2007–2025	Colorado	Republican	1954–present
Charles N. Lamison	1871–1875	Ohio	Democratic	1826–1896
Arthur P. Lamneck	1931–1939	Ohio	Democratic	1880–1944
Florian Lampert	1918–1930	Wisconsin	Republican	1863–1930
William H. Lamport	1871–1875	New York	Republican	1811–1891
Nick Lampson	1997–2005; 2007–2009	Texas	Democratic	1945–present
Columbia Lancaster	1854–1855	Washington	Democratic	1803–1893
Martin Lancaster	1987–1995	North Carolina	Democratic	1943–present
Leonard Lance	2009–2019	New Jersey	Republican	1952–present
Franklin Landers	1875–1877	Indiana	Democratic	1825–1901
George M. Landers	1875–1879	Connecticut	Democratic	1813–1895
Silas Z. Landes	1885–1889	Illinois	Democratic	1842–1910
Earl Landgrebe	1969–1975	Indiana	Republican	1916–1986
Charles B. Landis	1897–1909	Indiana	Republican	1858–1922
Frederick Landis	1903–1907	Indiana	Republican	1872–1934
Gerald W. Landis	1939–1949	Indiana	Republican	1895–1971
John M. Landrum	1859–1861	Louisiana	Democratic	1815–1861
Phillip M. Landrum	1953–1977	Georgia	Democratic	1907–1990
Jeff Landry	2011–2013	Louisiana	Republican	1970–present
Joseph Aristide Landry	1851–1853	Louisiana	Whig	1817–1881
James Landy	1857–1859	Pennsylvania	Democratic	1813–1875
Amos Lane	1833–1837	Indiana	Democratic	1778–1849
Edward Lane	1887–1895	Illinois	Democratic	1842–1912
Henry S. Lane	1840–1843	Indiana	Whig	1811–1881
Jim Lane	1853–1855	Indiana	Democratic	1814–1866
Joseph Lane	1851–1859	Oregon	Democratic	1801–1881
Joseph R. Lane	1899–1901	Iowa	Republican	1858–1931
Lafayette Lane	1875–1877	Oregon	Democratic	1842–1896
Thomas J. Lane	1941–1963	Massachusetts	Democratic	1898–1994
Chauncey Langdon	1815–1817	Vermont	Federalist	1763–1830
Odin Langen	1959–1971	Minnesota	Republican	1913–1976
James Langevin	2001–2023	Rhode Island	Democratic	1964–present
J. N. Langham	1909–1915	Pennsylvania	Republican	1861–1945
John W. Langley	1907–1926	Kentucky	Republican	1868–1932
Katherine G. Langley	1927–1931	Kentucky	Republican	1888–1948
John Mercer Langston	1890–1891	Virginia	Republican	1829–1897
Fritz G. Lanham	1919–1947	Texas	Democratic	1880–1965
Henderson L. Lanham	1947–1957	Georgia	Democratic	1888–1957
S. W. T. Lanham	1883–1893; 1897–1903	Texas	Democratic	1846–1908
J. Ford Laning	1907–1909	Ohio	Republican	1853–1941
James Lankford	2011–2015	Oklahoma	Republican	1968–present
Menalcus Lankford	1929–1933	Virginia	Republican	1883–1937
Richard Lankford	1955–1965	Maryland	Democratic	1914–2003
William C. Lankford	1919–1933	Georgia	Democratic	1877–1964
William M. Lanning	1903–1904	New Jersey	Republican	1849–1912
Frederick Lansing	1889–1891	New York	Republican	1838–1894
Gerrit Y. Lansing	1831–1837	New York	Democratic	1783–1862
William E. Lansing	1861–1863; 1871–1875	New York	Republican	1821–1883
William C. Lantaff	1951–1955	Florida	Democratic	1913–1970
Tom Lantos	1981–2008	California	Democratic	1928–2008
James J. Lanzetta	1933–1935; 1937–1939	New York	Democratic	1894–1956
Elbridge G. Lapham	1875–1881	New York	Republican	1814–1890
Oscar Lapham	1891–1895	Rhode Island	Democratic	1837–1926
John Laporte	1833–1837	Pennsylvania	Democratic	1798–1862
Henry D. Larcade Jr.	1943–1953	Louisiana	Democratic	1890–1966
Steve Largent	1994–2002	Oklahoma	Republican	1954–present
Simon Larned	1804–1805	Massachusetts	Democratic-Republican	1753–1817
Larry LaRocco	1991–1995	Idaho	Democratic	1946–present
Charles H. Larrabee	1859–1861	Wisconsin	Democratic	1820–1883
William Larrabee	1931–1943	Indiana	Democratic	1870–1960
Tulio Larrínaga	1905–1911	Puerto Rico	Union	1847–1917
William Washington Larsen	1917–1933	Georgia	Democratic	1871–1938
Oscar Larson	1921–1925	Minnesota	Republican	1871–1957
Israel G. Lash	1868–1871	North Carolina	Republican	1810–1878
Francis R. Lassiter	1900–1903; 1907–1909	Virginia	Democratic	1866–1909
George R. Latham	1865–1867	West Virginia	Unconditional Unionist	1832–1917
Henry J. Latham	1945–1958	New York	Republican	1908–2002
Louis C. Latham	1881–1883; 1887–1889	North Carolina	Democratic	1840–1895
Milton Latham	1853–1855	California	Democratic	1827–1882
Tom Latham	1995–2015	Iowa	Republican	1948–present
Samuel Lathrop	1819–1825	Massachusetts	Federalist	1772–1846
Samuel Lathrop	1825–1827	Massachusetts	National Republican	1772–1846
William Lathrop	1877–1879	Illinois	Republican	1825–1907
Asbury Latimer	1893–1903	South Carolina	Democratic	1851–1908
Henry Latimer	1794–1795	Delaware	Federalist	1752–1819
Steve LaTourette	1995–2013	Ohio	Republican	1954–2016
Del Latta	1959–1989	Ohio	Republican	1920–2016
James P. Latta	1909–1911	Nebraska	Democratic	1844–1911
William Lattimore	1803–1807; 1813–1817	Mississippi	None	1774–1843
Jake LaTurner	2021–2025	Kansas	Republican	1988–present
Greg Laughlin	1989–1995	Texas	Democratic	1942–present
Greg Laughlin	1995–1997	Texas	Republican	1942–present
John Laurance	1789–1793	New York	Pro-Administration	1750–1810
Charles B. Law	1905-1911	New York	Republican	1872–1929
John Law	1861-1865	Indiana	Democratic	1796–1873
Lyman Law	1811-1817	Connecticut	Federalist	1770–1842
Frank Lawler	1885–1891	Illinois	Democratic	1842–1896
Joab Lawler	1835–1837	Alabama	Democratic	1796–1838
Joab Lawler	1837–1838	Alabama	Whig	1796–1838
Abbott Lawrence	1835–1837	Massachusetts	National Republican	1792–1855
Abbott Lawrence	1839–1840	Massachusetts	Whig	1792–1855
Brenda Lawrence	2015–2023	Michigan	Democratic	1954–present
Cornelius Lawrence	1833–1834	New York	Democratic	1791–1861
Effingham Lawrence	1875	Louisiana	Democratic	1820–1878
George P. Lawrence	1897–1913	Massachusetts	Republican	1859–1917
George V.E. Lawrence	1865–1869; 1883–1885	Pennsylvania	Republican	1818–1904
Henry F. Lawrence	1921–1923	Missouri	Republican	1868–1950
John W. Lawrence	1845–1847	New York	Democratic	1800–1888
Joseph Lawrence	1825–1829	Pennsylvania	National Republican	1786–1842
Joseph Lawrence	1841–1842	Pennsylvania	Whig	1786–1842
Samuel Lawrence	1823–1825	New York	Democratic-Republican	1773–1837
Sidney Lawrence	1847–1849	New York	Democratic	1801–1892
William Lawrence	1857–1859	Ohio	Democratic	1814–1895
William Lawrence	1865–1871; 1873–1877	Ohio	Republican	1819–1899
William T. Lawrence	1847–1849	New York	Whig	1788–1859
Gilbert L. Laws	1889–1891	Nebraska	Republican	1838–1907
Al Lawson	2017–2023	Florida	Democratic	1948–present
John D. Lawson	1873–1875	New York	Republican	1816–1896
John W. Lawson	1891–1893	Virginia	Democratic	1837–1905
Thomas G. Lawson	1891–1897	Georgia	Democratic	1835–1912
Thomas Lawyer	1817–1819	New York	Democratic-Republican	1785–1868
Alfred M. Lay	1879	Missouri	Democratic	1836–1879
George W. Lay	1833–1835	New York	Anti-Masonic	1798–1860
George W. Lay	1835–1837	New York	National Republican	1798–1860
Caleb R. Layton	1919–1923	Delaware	Republican	1851–1930
Fernando C. Layton	1891–1897	Ohio	Democratic	1847–1926
Ladislas Lazaro	1913–1927	Louisiana	Democratic	1872–1927
Jesse Lazear	1861–1865	Pennsylvania	Democratic	1804–1877
Rick Lazio	1993–2001	New York	Republican	1958–present
Francis Celeste Le Blond	1863–1867	Ohio	Democratic	1821–1902
Jacob LeFever	1893–1897	New York	Republican	1830–1905
Benjamin Le Fevre	1879–1887	Ohio	Democratic	1838–1922
Frank J. LeFevre	1905–1907	New York	Republican	1874–1941
Jay Le Fevre	1943–1951	New York	Republican	1893–1970
John V. Le Moyne	1876–1877	Illinois	Democratic	1828–1918
Clarence F. Lea	1917–1949	California	Democratic	1874–1964
Luke Lea	1833–1835	Tennessee	Democratic	1783–1851
Luke Lea	1835–1837	Tennessee	National Republican	1783–1851
Pryor Lea	1827–1831	Tennessee	Democratic	1794–1879
Buddy Leach	1979–1981	Louisiana	Democratic	1934–2022
Dewitt C. Leach	1857–1861	Michigan	Republican	1822–1909
James M. Leach	1859–1861	North Carolina	Oppositionist	1815–1891
James M. Leach	1871–1875	North Carolina	Democratic	1815–1891
Jim Leach	1977–2007	Iowa	Republican	1942–2024
Robert M. Leach	1924–1925	Massachusetts	Republican	1879–1952
Daniel P. Leadbetter	1837–1841	Ohio	Democratic	1797–1870
Eugene W. Leake	1907–1909	New Jersey	Democratic	1877–1959
Shelton Leake	1845–1847	Virginia	Democratic	1812–1884
Shelton Leake	1859–1861	Virginia	Independent Democrat	1812–1884
Amasa Learned	1791–1795	Connecticut	Pro-Administration	1750–1825
Cornelius Leary	1861–1863	Maryland	Unionist	1813–1893
Marvin Leath	1979–1991	Texas	Democratic	1931–2000
Elmer O. Leatherwood	1921–1929	Utah	Republican	1872–1929
Elias W. Leavenworth	1875–1877	New York	Republican	1803–1887
Humphrey H. Leavitt	1830–1834	Ohio	Democratic	1796–1873
Scott Leavitt	1923–1933	Montana	Republican	1879–1966
Charles H. Leavy	1937–1942	Washington	Democratic	1884–1952
John LeBoutillier	1981–1983	New York	Republican	1953–present
Joseph Lecompte	1825–1833	Kentucky	Democratic	1797–1851
Karl M. LeCompte	1939–1959	Iowa	Republican	1887–1972
Raymond Lederer	1977–1981	Pennsylvania	Democratic	1938–2008
Raymond Lederer	1977–1981	Pennsylvania	Democratic	1938–2008
Barbara Lee	1988–2025	California	Republican	1946–present
Frank H. Lee	1933–1935	Missouri	Democratic	1873–1952
Gary A. Lee	1979–1983	New York	Republican	1933–2022
Gideon Lee	1835–1837	New York	Democratic	1778–1841
Gordon Lee	1905–1927	Georgia	Democratic	1859–1927
Henry Lee	1799–1801	Virginia	Federalist	1756–1818
John Lee	1823–1825	Maryland	Federalist	1788–1871
Joshua Lee	1835–1837	New York	Democratic	1783–1842
Joshua B. Lee	1935–1937	Oklahoma	Democratic	1892–1967
M. Lindley Lee	1859–1861	New York	Republican	1805–1876
Richard Bland Lee	1789–1795	Virginia	Pro-Administration	1761–1827
Robert Emmett Lee	1911–1915	Pennsylvania	Democratic	1868–1916
Robert Quincy Lee	1929–1930	Texas	Democratic	1869–1930
Silas Lee	1799–1801	Massachusetts	Federalist	1760–1814
Thomas Lee	1833–1837	New Jersey	Democratic	1780–1856
Warren I. Lee	1921–1923	New York	Republican	1876–1955
W. H. F. Lee	1887–1891	Virginia	Democratic	1837–1891
Erica Lee Carter	2024–2025	Texas	Democratic	1980–present
J. Russell Leech	1927–1932	Pennsylvania	Republican	1888–1952
John P. Leedom	1881–1883	Ohio	Democratic	1847–1895
Isaac Leet	1839–1841	Pennsylvania	Democratic	1801–1844
Joseph A. LeFante	1977–1978	New Jersey	Democratic	1928–1997
Joseph Lefever	1811–1813	Pennsylvania	Democratic-Republican	1760–1826
John Lefferts	1813–1815	New York	Democratic-Republican	1785–1829
Isaac Leffler	1827–1829	Virginia	National Republican	1788–1866
Shepherd Leffler	1846–1851	Iowa	Democratic	1811–1879
Jabez Leftwich	1821–1825	Virginia	Democratic-Republican	1765–1855
John W. Leftwich	1866–1867	Tennessee	Unconditional Unionist	1826–1870
Benito Legarda	1907–1912	Philippines	None	1853–1915
George Swinton Legaré	1903–1913	South Carolina	Democratic	1869–1913
Hugh S. Legaré	1837–1839	South Carolina	Democratic	1797–1843
Robert L. Leggett	1963–1979	California	Democratic	1926–1997
Frederick R. Lehlbach	1915–1937	New Jersey	Republican	1876–1937
Herman Lehlbach	1885–1891	New Jersey	Republican	1845–1904
Richard H. Lehman	1983–1995	California	Democratic	1948–present
William Lehman	1973–1993	Florida	Democratic	1913–2005
William Eckart Lehman	1861–1863	Pennsylvania	Democratic	1821–1895
John C. Lehr	1933–1935	Michigan	Democratic	1878–1958
Michael Leib	1799–1806	Pennsylvania	Democratic-Republican	1760–1822
Owen D. Leib	1845–1847	Pennsylvania	Democratic	????–1848
Paul Leidy	1857–1859	Pennsylvania	Democratic	1813–1877
Jacob D. Leighty	1895–1897	Indiana	Republican	1839–1912
George G. Leiper	1829–1831	Pennsylvania	Democratic	1786–1868
John Leisenring	1895–1897	Pennsylvania	Republican	1853–1901
Benjamin F. Leiter	1855–1857	Ohio	Oppositionist	1813–1866
Benjamin F. Leiter	1857–1859	Ohio	Republican	1813–1866
Mickey Leland	1979–1989	Texas	Democratic	1944–1989
William Lemke	1933–1941	North Dakota	Non-Partisan	1878–1950
William Lemke	1943–1950	North Dakota	Republican	1878–1950
John T. Lenahan	1907–1909	Pennsylvania	Democratic	1852–1920
Alton Lennon	1957–1973	North Carolina	Democratic	1906–1986
Irvine Lenroot	1909–1918	Wisconsin	Republican	1869–1949
James Lent	1829–1833	New York	Democratic	1782–1833
Norman F. Lent	1971–1993	New York	Republican	1931–2012
John J. Lentz	1897–1901	Ohio	Democratic	1856–1931
Fred C. Leonard	1895–1897	Pennsylvania	Republican	1856–1921
George Leonard	1789–1793	Massachusetts	Pro-Administration	1729–1819
George Leonard	1795–1797	Massachusetts	Federalist	1729–1819
John E. Leonard	1877–1878	Louisiana	Republican	1845–1878
Moses G. Leonard	1843–1845	New York	Democratic	1809–1899
Stephen B. Leonard	1835–1837; 1839–1841	New York	Democratic	1793–1876
John V. Lesher	1913–1921	Pennsylvania	Democratic	1866–1932
John Lesinski Jr.	1951–1965	Michigan	Democratic	1914–2005
John Lesinski Sr.	1933–1950	Michigan	Democratic	1885–1950
Debbie Lesko	2018–2025	Arizona	Republican	1958–present
Montague Lessler	1902–1903	New York	Republican	1869–1938
Posey G. Lester	1889–1893	Virginia	Democratic	1850–1929
Rufus E. Lester	1889–1906	Georgia	Democratic	1837–1906
John Letcher	1851–1859	Virginia	Democratic	1813–1884
Robert P. Letcher	1823–1825	Kentucky	Democratic-Republican	1788–1861
Robert P. Letcher	1825–1833; 1834–1835	Kentucky	National Republican	1788–1861
F. Dickinson Letts	1925–1931	Iowa	Republican	1875–1965
Asbury F. Lever	1901–1919	South Carolina	Democratic	1875–1940
Robert W. Levering	1959–1961	Ohio	Democratic	1914–1989
Andy Levin	2019–2023	Michigan	Democratic	1960–present
Lewis Charles Levin	1845–1851	Pennsylvania	American	1808–1860
Sander Levin	1983–2019	Michigan	Democratic	1931–present
Mel Levine	1983–1993	California	Democratic	1943–present
Elliott H. Levitas	1975–1985	Georgia	Democratic	1930–2022
David A. Levy	1993–1995	New York	Republican	1953–present
Jefferson Monroe Levy	1899–1901; 1911–1915	New York	Democratic	1852–1924
William M. Levy	1875–1877	Louisiana	Democratic	1827–1882
Abner Lewis	1845–1847	New York	Whig	1801–1879
Barbour Lewis	1873–1875	Tennessee	Republican	1818–1893
Burwell Boykin Lewis	1875–1877; 1879–1880	Alabama	Democratic	1838–1885
Charles S. Lewis	1854–1855	Virginia	Democratic	1821–1878
Clarke Lewis	1889–1893	Mississippi	Democratic	1840–1896
David John Lewis	1911–1917; 1931–1939	Maryland	Democratic	1869–1952
Dixon H. Lewis	1829–1844	Alabama	Democratic	1802–1848
Earl Ramage Lewis	1939–1941; 1943–1949	Ohio	Republican	1887–1956
Edward T. Lewis	1883–1885	Louisiana	Democratic	1834–1927
Elijah B. Lewis	1897–1909	Georgia	Democratic	1854–1920
Fred E. Lewis	1913–1915	Pennsylvania	Republican	1865–1949
J. Hamilton Lewis	1897–1899	Washington	Democratic	1863–1939
Jason Lewis	2017–2019	Minnesota	Republican	1955–present
Jerry Lewis	1979–2013	California	Republican	1934–2021
John H. Lewis	1881–1883	Illinois	Republican	1830–1929
John Lewis	1987-2020	Georgia	Democratic	1940–2020
John W. Lewis	1895–1897	Kentucky	Republican	1841–1913
Joseph Lewis Jr.	1803–1817	Virginia	Federalist	1772–1834
Joseph Horace Lewis	1870–1873	Kentucky	Democratic	1824–1904
Lawrence Lewis	1933–1943	Colorado	Democratic	1879–1943
Robert Jacob Lewis	1901–1903	Pennsylvania	Republican	1864–1933
Ron Lewis	1994–2009	Kentucky	Republican	1946–present
Thomas Lewis Jr.	1803–1804	Virginia	Federalist	1760–1847
Tom Lewis	1983–1995	Florida	Republican	1924–2003
William Lewis	1948–1949	Kentucky	Republican	1868–1959
William J. Lewis	1817–1819	Virginia	Democratic-Republican	1766–1828
Harry Libbey	1883–1885	Virginia	Readjuster	1843–1913
Harry Libbey	1885–1887	Virginia	Republican	1843–1913
Roland V. Libonati	1957–1965	Illinois	Democratic	1900–1991
Norton Lichtenwalner	1931–1933	Pennsylvania	Democratic	1889–1960
Franklin H. Lichtenwalter	1947–1951	Pennsylvania	Republican	1910–1973
Charles Lieb	1913–1917	Indiana	Democratic	1852–1928
Michael Liebel Jr.	1915–1917	Pennsylvania	Democratic	1870–1927
Jim Ross Lightfoot	1985–1997	Iowa	Republican	1938–present
Robert F. Ligon	1877–1879	Alabama	Democratic	1823–1901
Thomas Watkins Ligon	1845–1849	Maryland	Democratic	1810–1881
George L. Lilley	1903–1909	Connecticut	Republican	1859–1909
Mial E. Lilley	1905–1907	Pennsylvania	Republican	1850–1915
Samuel Lilly	1853–1855	New Jersey	Democratic	1815–1880
Thomas Jefferson Lilly	1923–1925	West Virginia	Democratic	1878–1956
William Lilly	1893	Pennsylvania	Republican	1821–1893
Abraham Lincoln	1847–1849	Illinois	Whig	1809–1865
Blanche Lincoln	1993–1997	Arkansas	Democratic	1960–present
Enoch Lincoln	1818–1821	Massachusetts	Democratic-Republican	1788–1829
Enoch Lincoln	1821–1826	Maine	National Republican	1788–1829
Levi Lincoln Jr.	1834–1837	Massachusetts	National Republican	1782–1868
Levi Lincoln Jr.	1837–1841	Massachusetts	Whig	1782–1868
Levi Lincoln Sr.	1800–1801	Massachusetts	Democratic-Republican	1749–1820
William S. Lincoln	1867–1869	New York	Republican	1813–1893
James F. Lind	1949–1953	Pennsylvania	Democratic	1900–1975
John Lind	1887–1893	Minnesota	Republican	1854–1930
John Lind	1903–1905	Minnesota	Democratic	1854–1930
Charles August Lindbergh	1907–1917	Minnesota	Republican	1859–1924
John Linder	1993–2011	Georgia	Republican	1942–present
James Johnson Lindley	1853–1855	Missouri	Whig	1822–1891
James Johnson Lindley	1855–1857	Missouri	Oppositionist	1822–1891
Francis O. Lindquist	1913–1915	Michigan	Republican	1869–1924
George H. Lindsay	1901–1913	New York	Democratic	1837–1916
George W. Lindsay	1923–1935	New York	Democratic	1865–1938
John Lindsay	1959–1965	New York	Republican	1921–2000
Stephen Lindsey	1877–1883	Maine	Republican	1828–1884
James Girard Lindsley	1885–1887	New York	Republican	1819–1898
William D. Lindsley	1853–1855	Ohio	Democratic	1812–1890
Walter F. Lineberger	1921–1927	California	Republican	1883–1943
Neil J. Linehan	1949–1951	Illinois	Democratic	1895–1967
Arthur A. Link	1971–1973	North Dakota	Democratic	1914–2010
William W. Link	1945–1947	Illinois	Democratic	1884–1950
Archibald L. Linn	1841–1843	New York	Whig	1802–1857
James Linn	1799–1801	New Jersey	Democratic-Republican	1749–1821
John Linn	1817–1821	New Jersey	Democratic-Republican	1763–1821
Romulus Z. Linney	1895–1901	North Carolina	Republican	1841–1910
J. Charles Linthicum	1911–1932	Maryland	Democratic	1867–1932
William S. Linton	1893–1897	Michigan	Republican	1856–1927
Bill Lipinski	1983–2005	Illinois	Democratic	1937–present
Dan Lipinski	2005–2021	Illinois	Democratic	1966–present
Glenard P. Lipscomb	1953–1970	California	Republican	1915–1970
Marcus C. Lisle	1893–1894	Kentucky	Democratic	1862–1894
Elisha Litchfield	1821–1825	New York	Democratic-Republican	1785–1859
Lucius N. Littauer	1897–1907	New York	Republican	1859–1944
Chauncey B. Little	1925–1927	Kansas	Democratic	1877–1952
Edward C. Little	1917–1924	Kansas	Republican	1858–1924
Edward P. Little	1852–1853	Massachusetts	Democratic	1791–1875
John Little	1885–1887	Ohio	Republican	1837–1900
John S. Little	1894–1907	Arkansas	Democratic	1851–1916
Joseph J. Little	1891–1893	New York	Democratic	1841–1913
Peter Little	1811–1813; 1816–1825	Maryland	Democratic-Republican	1775–1830
Peter Little	1825–1829	Maryland	National Republican	1775–1830
Charles E. Littlefield	1899–1908	Maine	Republican	1851–1915
Nathaniel S. Littlefield	1841–1843; 1849–1851	Maine	Democratic	1804–1882
De Witt C. Littlejohn	1863–1865	New York	Republican	1818–1892
Adam B. Littlepage	1911–1913; 1915–1919	West Virginia	Democratic	1859–1921
Martin W. Littleton	1911–1913	New York	Democratic	1872–1934
Jerry Litton	1973–1976	Missouri	Democratic	1937–1976
Robert M. Lively	1910–1911	Texas	Democratic	1855–1929
Arthur Livermore	1817–1821; 1823–1825	New Hampshire	Democratic-Republican	1766–1853
Edward St. Loe Livermore	1807–1811	Massachusetts	Federalist	1762–1832
Samuel Livermore	1789–1793	New Hampshire	Federalist	1732–1803
Edward J. Livernash	1903–1905	California	Democratic	1866–1938
Bob Livingston	1977–1999	Louisiana	Republican	1943–present
Edward Livingston	1795–1801	New York	Democratic-Republican	1764–1836
Edward Livingston	1823–1829	Louisiana	Democratic	1764–1836
Henry W. Livingston	1803–1807	New York	Federalist	1768–1810
Leonidas F. Livingston	1891–1911	Georgia	Democratic	1832–1912
Robert Le Roy Livingston	1809–1812	New York	Federalist	1778–1836
Edward Lloyd	1806–1809	Maryland	Democratic-Republican	1779–1834
James F. Lloyd	1975–1981	California	Democratic	1922–2012
James Tilghman Lloyd	1897–1917	Missouri	Democratic	1857–1944
Marilyn Lloyd	1975–1995	Tennessee	Democratic	1929–2018
Sherman P. Lloyd	1963–1965; 1967–1973	Utah	Republican	1914–1979
Wesley Lloyd	1933–1936	Washington	Democratic	1883–1936
Benjamin F. Loan	1863–1865	Missouri	Unconditional Unionist	1819–1881
Benjamin F. Loan	1865–1869	Missouri	Republican	1819–1881
Charles O. Lobeck	1911–1919	Nebraska	Democratic	1852–1920
Frank LoBiondo	1995–2019	New Jersey	Republican	1946–present
John Locke	1823–1825	Massachusetts	Democratic-Republican	1764–1855
John Locke	1825–1829	Massachusetts	National Republican	1764–1855
Matthew Locke	1793–1795	North Carolina	Anti-Administration	1730–1801
Matthew Locke	1795–1799	North Carolina	Democratic-Republican	1730–1801
James Lockhart	1851–1853; 1857	Indiana	Democratic	1806–1857
James A. Lockhart	1895–1896	North Carolina	Democratic	1850–1905
Daniel N. Lockwood	1877–1879; 1891–1895	New York	Democratic	1844–1906
Henry Cabot Lodge	1887–1893	Massachusetts	Republican	1850–1924
John Davis Lodge	1947–1951	Connecticut	Republican	1903–1985
Dave Loebsack	2007–2021	Iowa	Democratic	1952–present
Tom Loeffler	1979–1987	Texas	Republican	1946–present
James R. Lofland	1873–1875	Delaware	Republican	1823–1894
George W. Loft	1913–1917	New York	Democratic	1865–1943
Henry Logan	1835–1839	Pennsylvania	Democratic	1784–1866
John A. Logan	1859–1862	Illinois	Democratic	1826–1886
John A. Logan	1867–1871	Illinois	Republican	1826–1886
W. Turner Logan	1921–1925	South Carolina	Democratic	1874–1941
J. Washington Logue	1913–1915	Pennsylvania	Democratic	1863–1925
Meyer London	1915–1919; 1921–1923	New York	Socialist	1871–1926
Augustine Lonergan	1913–1915; 1917–1921; 1931–1933	Connecticut	Democratic	1874–1947
Alexander Long	1863–1865	Ohio	Democratic	1816–1886
Billy Long	2011–2023	Missouri	Republican	1955–present
Catherine Small Long	1985–1987	Louisiana	Democratic	1924–2019
Chester I. Long	1895–1897; 1899–1903	Kansas	Republican	1860–1934
Clarence Long	1963–1985	Maryland	Democratic	1908–1994
Edward H. C. Long	1845–1847	Maryland	Whig	1808–1865
George S. Long	1953–1958	Louisiana	Democratic	1883–1958
Gillis W. Long	1963–1965; 1973–1985	Louisiana	Democratic	1923–1985
Jefferson F. Long	1870–1871	Georgia	Republican	1836–1901
Jill Long Thompson	1989–1995	Indiana	Democratic	1952–present
John Long	1821–1825	North Carolina	Democratic-Republican	1785–1857
John Long	1825–1829	North Carolina	National Republican	1785–1857
John B. Long	1891–1893	Texas	Democratic	1843–1924
John Davis Long	1883–1889	Massachusetts	Republican	1838–1915
Lewis M. Long	1937–1939	Illinois	Democratic	1883–1957
Speedy Long	1965–1973	Louisiana	Democratic	1928–2006
Stephen Longfellow	1823–1825	Maine	Federalist	1776–1849
James B. Longley Jr.	1995–1997	Maine	Republican	1951–present
Henry Clay Longnecker	1859–1861	Pennsylvania	Republican	1820–1871
Nicholas Longworth	1903–1913; 1915–1931	Ohio	Republican	1869–1931
John W. Longyear	1863–1867	Michigan	Republican	1820–1875
Frederick C. Loofbourow	1930–1933	Utah	Republican	1874–1949
Andrew W. Loomis	1837	Ohio	Whig	1797–1873
Arphaxed Loomis	1837–1839	New York	Democratic	1798–1885
Dwight Loomis	1859–1863	Connecticut	Republican	1821–1903
Greg Lopez	2024–2025	Colorado	Republican	1964–present
Bert Lord	1935–1939	New York	Republican	1869–1939
Frederick W. Lord	1847–1849	New York	Democratic	1800–1860
Henry W. Lord	1881–1883	Michigan	Republican	1821–1891
Scott Lord	1875–1877	New York	Democratic	1820–1885
Charles B. Lore	1883–1887	Delaware	Democratic	1831–1911
William Lorimer	1895–1901; 1903–1909	Illinois	Republican	1861–1934
George B. Loring	1877–1881	Massachusetts	Republican	1817–1891
J. Carlton Loser	1957–1963	Tennessee	Democratic	1892–1984
Trent Lott	1973–1989	Mississippi	Republican	1941–present
Eugene F. Loud	1891–1903	California	Republican	1847–1908
George A. Loud	1903–1913; 1915–1917	Michigan	Republican	1852–1925
Henry C. Loudenslager	1893–1911	New Jersey	Republican	1852–1911
William Loughridge	1867–1871; 1873–1875	Iowa	Republican	1827–1889
William Lounsbery	1879–1881	New York	Democratic	1831–1905
James A. Louttit	1885–1887	California	Republican	1848–1906
Francis J. Love	1947–1949	West Virginia	Republican	1901–1989
James Love	1833–1835	Kentucky	National Republican	1795–1874
John Love	1807–1811	Virginia	Democratic-Republican	????–1822
Mia Love	2015–2019	Utah	Republican	1975–2025
Peter Early Love	1859–1861	Georgia	Democratic	1818–1866
Rodney M. Love	1965–1967	Ohio	Democratic	1908–1996
Thomas C. Love	1835–1837	New York	National Republican	1789–1853
William Carter Love	1815–1817	North Carolina	Democratic-Republican	1784–1835
William F. Love	1897–1898	Mississippi	Democratic	1850–1898
Owen Lovejoy	1857–1864	Illinois	Republican	1811–1864
Henry B. Lovering	1883–1887	Massachusetts	Democratic	1841–1911
William C. Lovering	1897–1910	Massachusetts	Republican	1835–1910
John Lovett	1813–1817	New York	Federalist	1761–1818
Oscar Lovette	1931–1933	Tennessee	Republican	1871–1934
Harold Lovre	1949–1957	South Dakota	Republican	1904–1972
Frederick Low	1862–1863	California	Republican	1828–1894
Philip B. Low	1895–1899	New York	Republican	1836–1912
Frank O. Lowden	1906–1911	Illinois	Republican	1861–1943
David P. Lowe	1871–1875	Kansas	Republican	1823–1882
William M. Lowe	1879–1881; 1882	Alabama	Greenbacker	1842–1882
Joshua A. Lowell	1839–1843	Maine	Democratic	1801–1874
Allard K. Lowenstein	1969–1971	New York	Democratic	1929–1980
Alan Lowenthal	2013–2023	California	Democratic	1941–present
Christian Lower	1805–1806	Pennsylvania	Democratic-Republican	1740–1806
Bill Lowery	1981–1993	California	Republican	1947–present
Nita Lowey	1989–2021	New York	Democratic	1937–2025
Lloyd Lowndes Jr.	1873–1875	Maryland	Republican	1845–1905
Thomas Lowndes	1801–1805	South Carolina	Federalist	1766–1843
William Lowndes	1811–1822	South Carolina	Democratic-Republican	1782–1822
Bill G. Lowrey	1921–1929	Mississippi	Democratic	1862–1947
Mike Lowry	1979–1989	Washington	Democratic	1939–2017
Robert Lowry	1883–1887	Indiana	Democratic	1824–1904
George Loyall	1830–1831; 1833–1837	Virginia	Democratic	1789–1868
Ralph F. Lozier	1923–1935	Missouri	Democratic	1866–1945
Edward Lucas	1833–1837	Virginia	Democratic	1780–1858
John Baptiste Charles Lucas	1803–1805	Pennsylvania	Democratic-Republican	1758–1842
Ken Lucas	1999–2005	Kentucky	Democratic	1933–present
Scott W. Lucas	1935–1939	Illinois	Democratic	1892–1968
William Lucas	1839–1841; 1843–1845	Virginia	Democratic	1800–1877
William V. Lucas	1893–1895	South Dakota	Republican	1835–1921
Wingate H. Lucas	1947–1955	Texas	Democratic	1908–1989
Clare Boothe Luce	1943–1947	Connecticut	Republican	1903–1987
Robert Luce	1919–1935; 1937–1941	Massachusetts	Republican	1862–1946
Henry Carl Luckey	1935–1939	Nebraska	Democratic	1868–1956
Alfred Lucking	1903–1905	Michigan	Democratic	1856–1929
Louis Ludlow	1929–1949	Indiana	Democratic	1873–1950
John F. Luecke	1937–1939	Michigan	Democratic	1889–1952
Blaine Luetkemeyer	2009–2025	Missouri	Republican	1952–present
Willfred W. Lufkin	1917–1921	Massachusetts	Republican	1879–1934
Oscar R. Luhring	1919–1923	Indiana	Republican	1879–1944
Ben Ray Luján	2009–2021	New Mexico	Democratic	1972–present
Manuel Lujan Jr.	1969–1989	New Mexico	Republican	1928–2019
Michelle Lujan Grisham	2013–2018	New Mexico	Democratic	1959–present
Charlie Luken	1991–1993	Ohio	Democratic	1951–present
Tom Luken	1974–1975; 1977–1991	Ohio	Democratic	1925–2018
Buz Lukens	1967–1971; 1987–1990	Ohio	Republican	1931–2010
Cynthia Lummis	2009-2017	Wyoming	Republican	1954–present
John H. Lumpkin	1843–1849; 1855–1857	Georgia	Democratic	1812–1860
Wilson Lumpkin	1815–1817	Georgia	Democratic-Republican	1783–1870
Wilson Lumpkin	1827–1831	Georgia	Democratic	1783–1870
Tranquilino Luna	1881–1884	New Mexico	Republican	1849–1892
Ernest Lundeen	1917–1919	Minnesota	Republican	1878–1940
Ernest Lundeen	1933–1937	Minnesota	Farmer-Labor	1878–1940
Frederick Lundin	1909–1911	Illinois	Republican	1868–1947
Stan Lundine	1976–1987	New York	Democratic	1939–present
Dan Lungren	1979–1989; 2005–2013	California	Republican	1946–present
George R. Lunn	1917–1919	New York	Democratic	1873–1948
Elaine Luria	2019–2023	Virginia	Democratic	1975–present
Georgia Lee Lusk	1947–1949	New Mexico	Democratic	1893–1971
Bill Luther	1995–2003	Minnesota	Democratic-Farmer-Labor	1945–present
John K. Luttrell	1873–1879	California	Democratic	1831–1893
Archibald Lybrand	1897–1901	Ohio	Republican	1840–1910
Aaron Lyle	1809–1817	Pennsylvania	Democratic-Republican	1759–1825
John E. Lyle Jr.	1945–1955	Texas	Democratic	1910–2003
Joseph Lyman	1885–1889	Iowa	Republican	1840–1890
Joseph S. Lyman	1819–1821	New York	Democratic-Republican	1785–1821
Samuel Lyman	1795–1800	Massachusetts	Federalist	1749–1802
Theodore Lyman III	1883–1885	Massachusetts	Independent Republican	1833–1897
William Lyman	1793–1795	Massachusetts	Anti-Administration	1755–1811
William Lyman	1795–1797	Massachusetts	Democratic-Republican	1755–1811
John Lynch	1865–1873	Maine	Republican	1825–1892
John Lynch	1887–1889	Pennsylvania	Democratic	1843–1910
John R. Lynch	1873–1877; 1882–1883	Mississippi	Republican	1847–1939
Thomas Lynch	1891–1895	Wisconsin	Democratic	1844–1898
Walter A. Lynch	1940–1951	New York	Democratic	1894–1957
William Pitt Lynde	1848–1849; 1875–1879	Wisconsin	Democratic	1817–1885
Asa Lyon	1815–1817	Vermont	Federalist	1763–1841
Caleb Lyon	1853–1855	New York	Independent	1822–1875
Chittenden Lyon	1827–1835	Kentucky	Democratic	1787–1842
Francis S. Lyon	1835–1837	Alabama	National Republican	1800–1882
Francis S. Lyon	1837–1839	Alabama	Whig	1800–1882
Homer L. Lyon	1921–1929	North Carolina	Democratic	1879–1956
Lucius Lyon	1833–1835; 1843–1845	Michigan	Democratic	1800–1851
Matthew Lyon	1797–1801	Vermont	Democratic-Republican	1749–1822
Matthew Lyon	1803–1811	Vermont	Kentucky	1749–1822
Robert Todd Lytle	1833–1834; 1834–1835	Ohio	Democratic	1804–1839
