= Henry D. Moore =

American politician

Henry Dunning Moore (April 13, 1817 – August 11, 1887) was a Whig member of the U.S. House of Representatives from Pennsylvania.

== Early life ==
Henry D. Moore was born in Goshen, New York. He moved with his parents to New York City in 1828. He attended the public schools and engaged in the tailoring business. He moved to Philadelphia in 1844 and engaged in the mahogany and marble business.

== Political career ==
Moore was elected as a Whig to the Thirty-first and Thirty-second Congresses. He was not a candidate for reelection in 1852. He was an unsuccessful candidate for mayor of Philadelphia in 1856. He was a delegate to the 1860 Republican National Convention.

He was elected the 26th and 28th Treasurer of Pennsylvania for Governor Curtin's administration and served from 1861 to 1863 and 1864 to 1865. He was appointed collector of the port of Philadelphia on March 30, 1869, and served until March 26, 1871, when he resigned.

== Russia ==
He traveled in Europe and resided in St. Petersburg, Russia, from 1870 to 1877.

== Death ==
He became associated with and managed the silver mines known as "The Daisy" in Big Evens Gulch near Leadville, Colorado, from 1885 until his death there in 1887. Originally interred in Monument Cemetery in Philadelphia, he was reinterred in 1956 at Lawnview Memorial Park in Rockledge, Pennsylvania.

U.S. House of Representatives
| Preceded by Charles Brown | Member of the U.S. House of Representatives from Pennsylvania's 3rd congressional district 1849–1853 | Succeeded by John Robbins |
Political offices
| Preceded by Eli Slifer | Treasurer of Pennsylvania; 1861–1863 | Succeeded by William V. McGrath |
| Preceded by William V. McGrath | Treasurer of Pennsylvania; 1864–1865 | Succeeded by William H. Kemble |
