= Thomas B. Florence =

American politician (1812–1875)

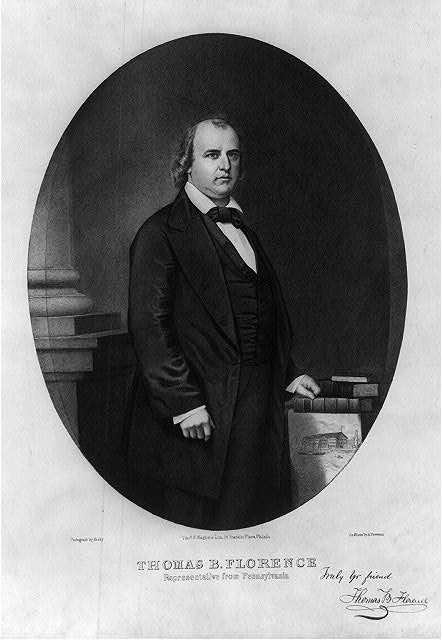

Member of the U.S. House of Representatives from Pennsylvania's 1st district
- In office March 4, 1851 – March 3, 1861
- Preceded by: Lewis Charles Levin
- Succeeded by: William Eckart Lehman

Personal details
- Born: January 26, 1812 Philadelphia, Pennsylvania, U.S.
- Died: July 3, 1875 (aged 63) Washington, D.C., U.S.
- Resting place: Lawnview Memorial Park, Rockledge, Pennsylvania, U.S.
- Party: Democratic

Thomas Birch Florence (January 26, 1812 – July 3, 1875) was a Democratic member of the U.S. House of Representatives from Pennsylvania.

== Biography ==
Thomas B. Florence born in Philadelphia, Pennsylvania. He learned the hatter's trade and engaged in that business in 1833. He was engaged in the newspaper business. He was an unsuccessful Democratic candidate for election in 1846 and 1848.

Florence was elected as a Democrat to the Thirty-second and to the four succeeding Congresses. After leaving Congress edited and published the Constitutional Union in Washington, D.C., and subsequently became the proprietor of the Sunday Gazette.

He was an unsuccessful candidate in his old district for election in 1868 and in 1874. He died in Washington, D.C. in 1875. He was originally buried in Monument Cemetery in Philadelphia which was closed in 1956 and his remains moved to Lawnview Memorial Park in Rockledge, Pennsylvania.

U.S. House of Representatives
Preceded by Lewis C. Levin	Member of the U.S. House of Representatives from Pennsylvania's 1st congressional district 1851–1861	Succeeded by William E. Lehman
