= John E. Clopp =

- Born: c. 1845; Philadelphia, Pennsylvania, US
- Died: April 6, 1866; Philadelphia, Pennsylvania, US
- Burial place: Lawnview Memorial Park, Rockledge, Pennsylvania, US
- Military career
- Allegiance: United States of America
- Branch: United States Army
- Rank: Private
- Unit: 71st Regiment, Pennsylvania Volunteer Infantry - Company F
- Conflicts: Battle of Gettysburg
- Awards: Medal of Honor

Private John E. Clopp (c. 1845 to April 6, 1866) was an American soldier who fought in the American Civil War. Clopp received the country's highest award for bravery during combat, the Medal of Honor, for his action during the Battle of Gettysburg in Pennsylvania on 3 July 1863. He was honored with the award on 2 February 1865.

== Biography ==
Clopp was born in Philadelphia, Pennsylvania, in 1845. He enlisted into the 71st Pennsylvania Infantry. He died on 6 April 1866 and his remains are interred at the Lawnview Memorial Park in Rockledge, Pennsylvania.

== Medal of Honor citation ==
Capture of flag of 9th Virginia Infantry (Confederate States of America), wresting it from the color bearer.

== See also ==
- List of Medal of Honor recipients for the Battle of Gettysburg
- List of American Civil War Medal of Honor recipients: A–F
