= Lawnview Memorial Park =

Cemetery in Rockledge, Montgomery County, Pennsylvania

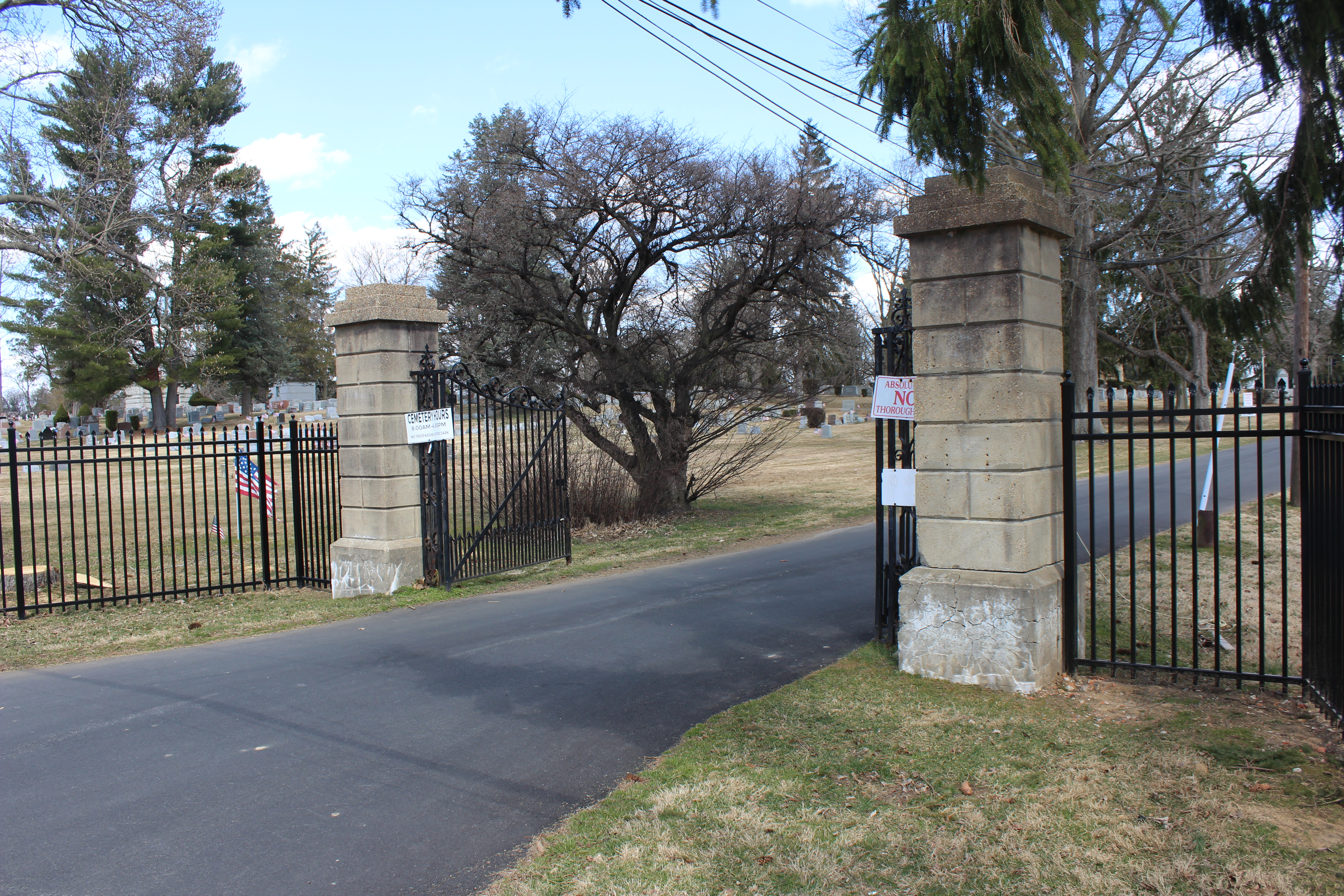
- Interactive map of Lawnview Memorial Park

Details
- Established: 1904
- Location: Rockledge, Pennsylvania
- Country: United States
- Coordinates: 40°04′52″N 75°05′54″W
- Type: private
- Owned by: Odd Fellows Cemetery Company of Philadelphia
- Size: 82 acres (33 ha)
- No. of graves: >36,000
- Website: cemeteryco.com/lawnview-cemetery/
- Find a Grave: Lawnview Memorial Park

Lawnview Memorial Park, also referred to as Lawnview Cemetery, is a cemetery located at 500 Huntingdon Pike in Rockledge, Pennsylvania. It is 82 acres (33 ha) in size and is managed by the Odd Fellows Cemetery Company of Philadelphia. It contains the reburial of tens of thousands of bodies from Monument Cemetery and the Odd Fellows Cemetery in Philadelphia after they were closed in the 1950s.

== History ==
In 1904, the cemetery was established in Rockledge, Pennsylvania. In 1914, a stone chapel was built to provide non-denominational services for funerals.

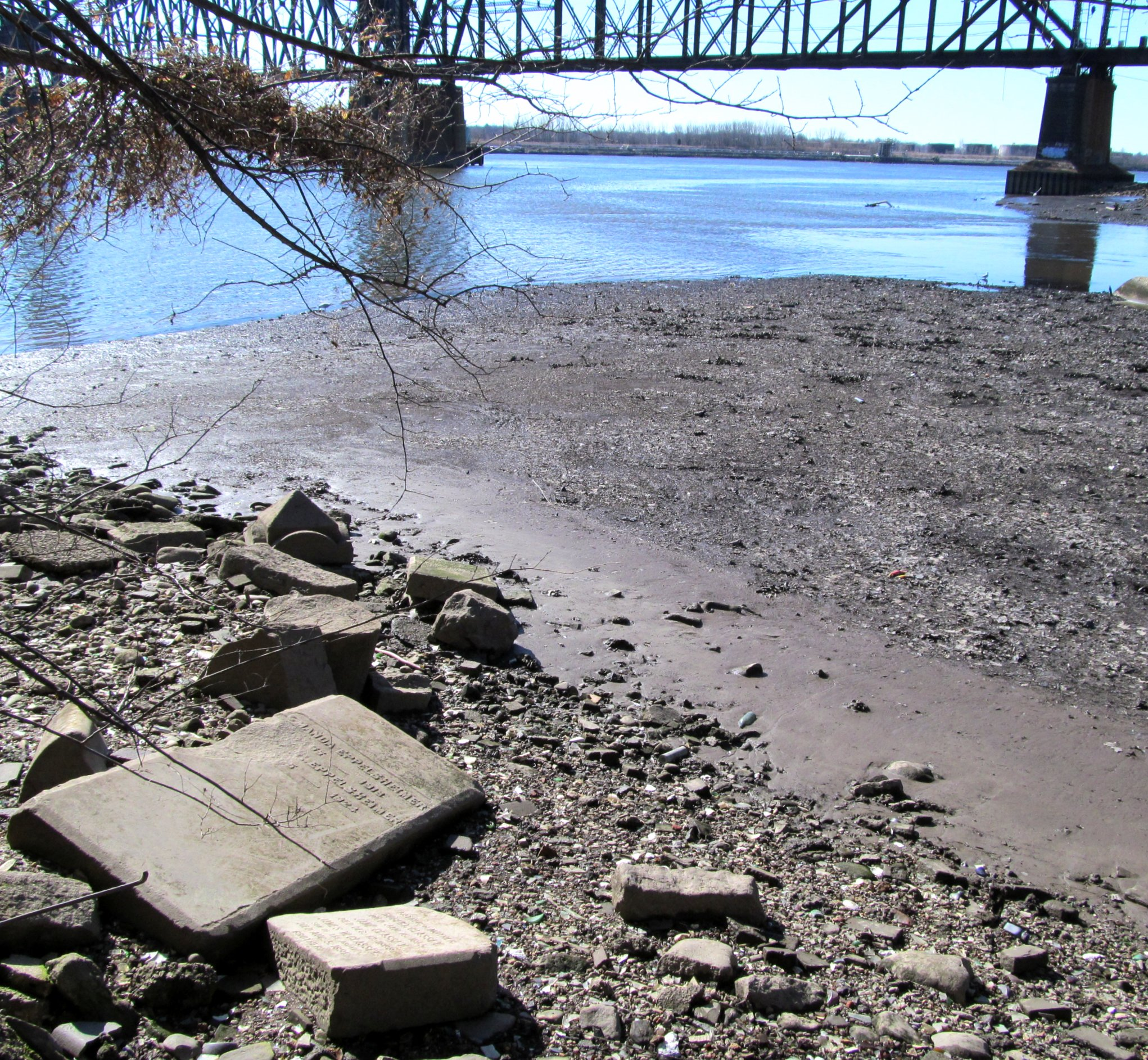
28,000 bodies were moved to Lawnview Cemetery from Monument Cemetery when it closed in 1956. However, most of the tombstones were used as riprap during the construction of the Betsy Ross Bridge and can be seen from the shore of the Delaware River at low tide

In 1956, Monument Cemetery in Philadelphia was closed and the property sold to Temple University and the Philadelphia Board of Education. The University contacted 748 families about the cemetery closure. Approximately 28,000 bodies were reinterred to Lawnview Memorial Park with only 300 grave markers included in the move for families members that were located. Most of the reinterments were placed in a mass grave. The original headstones were not used at the new grave sites. The majority of the remaining headstones were used as riprap during the construction of the Betsy Ross Bridge and can be seen on the shores of the Delaware River at low tide.

In 1951, the Oddfellows Cemetery in Philadelphia was acquired by the Philadelphia Housing Authority for construction of the Raymond Rosen housing project. The bodies were moved to two other cemeteries owned by the Odd Fellows – Mount Peace Cemetery in Philadelphia and Lawnview Memorial Park.

In 1973, the Oddfellows Cemetery Company of Philadelphia installed a flag pole in Lawnview Memorial Park with a memorial plaque commemorating veterans buried in Lawnview and other current and defunct Oddfellows cemeteries in the Philadelphia region.

In 1979, the chapel was converted to the Odd Fellows Cemetery Company's general offices.

== Notable burials ==
- DeWitt Clinton Baxter (1829–1881), Union Army colonel and brevet brigadier general
- Henry Brutsche (1846–1880), Medal of Honor recipient
- John Hull Campbell (1800–1868), U.S. Congressman
- John E. Clopp (1845–1866), Medal of Honor recipient
- Thomas Birch Florence (1812–1875), U.S. Congressman
- Andy Knox (1864–1940), Major League Baseball first baseman
- James Landy (1813–1875), U.S. Congressman
- George Lippard (1822–1854), novelist, journalist, playwright, social activist and labor organizer
- Henry Dunning Moore (1817–1887), U.S. Congressman
- C. Frederick Pracht (1880–1950), U.S. Congressman
- Hampton S. Thomas (1837–1899), Medal of Honor recipient
- Harold Charles Wilson (1903–1981), Olympic Bronze Medalist in rowing

== Gallery ==
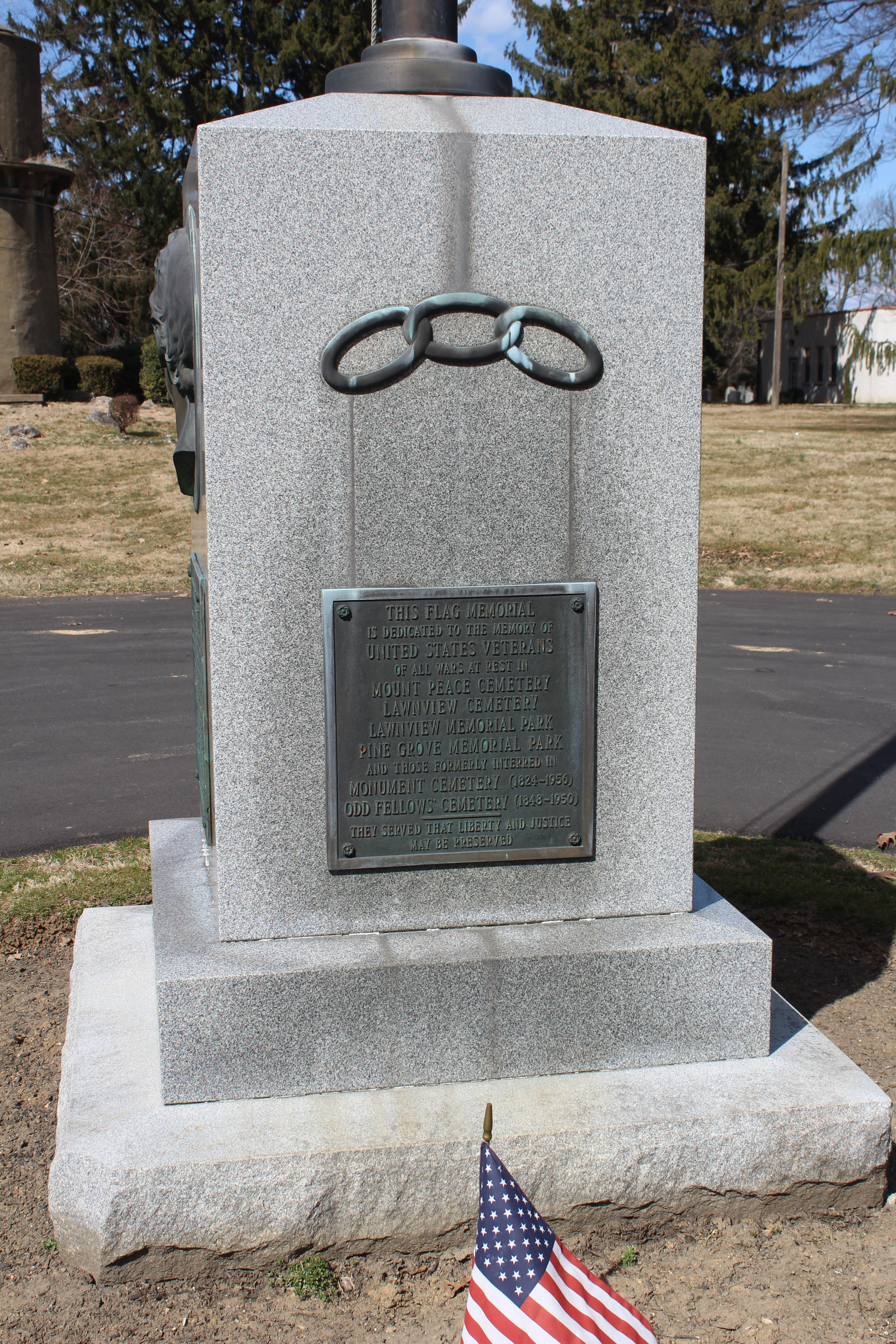
Flag Memorial to Veterans

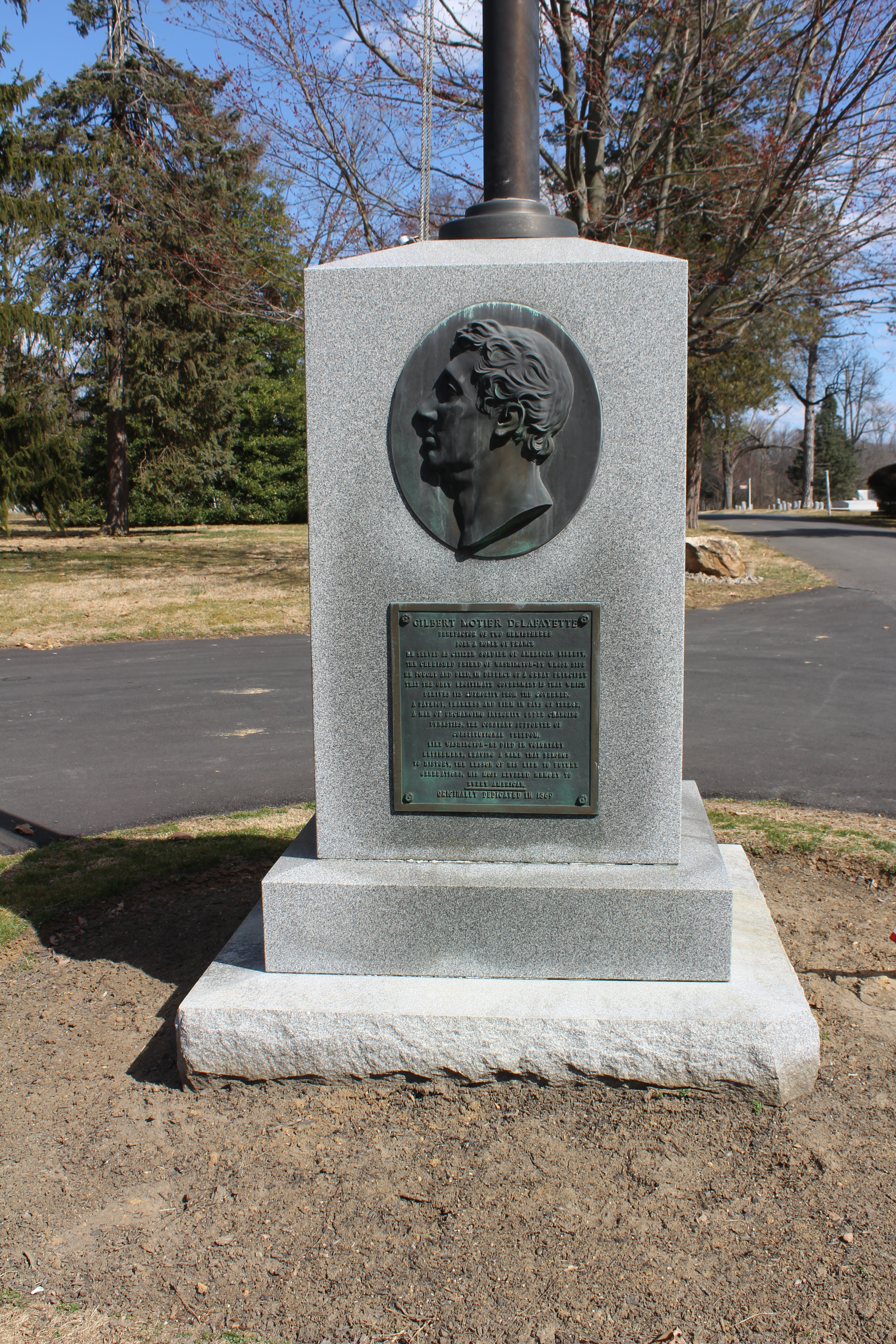
The bronze profile of the Marquis de Lafayette originally from the Memorial in Monument Cemetery in Philadelphia. It was originally dedicated in 1869 and moved to Lawnview Cemetery in 1956

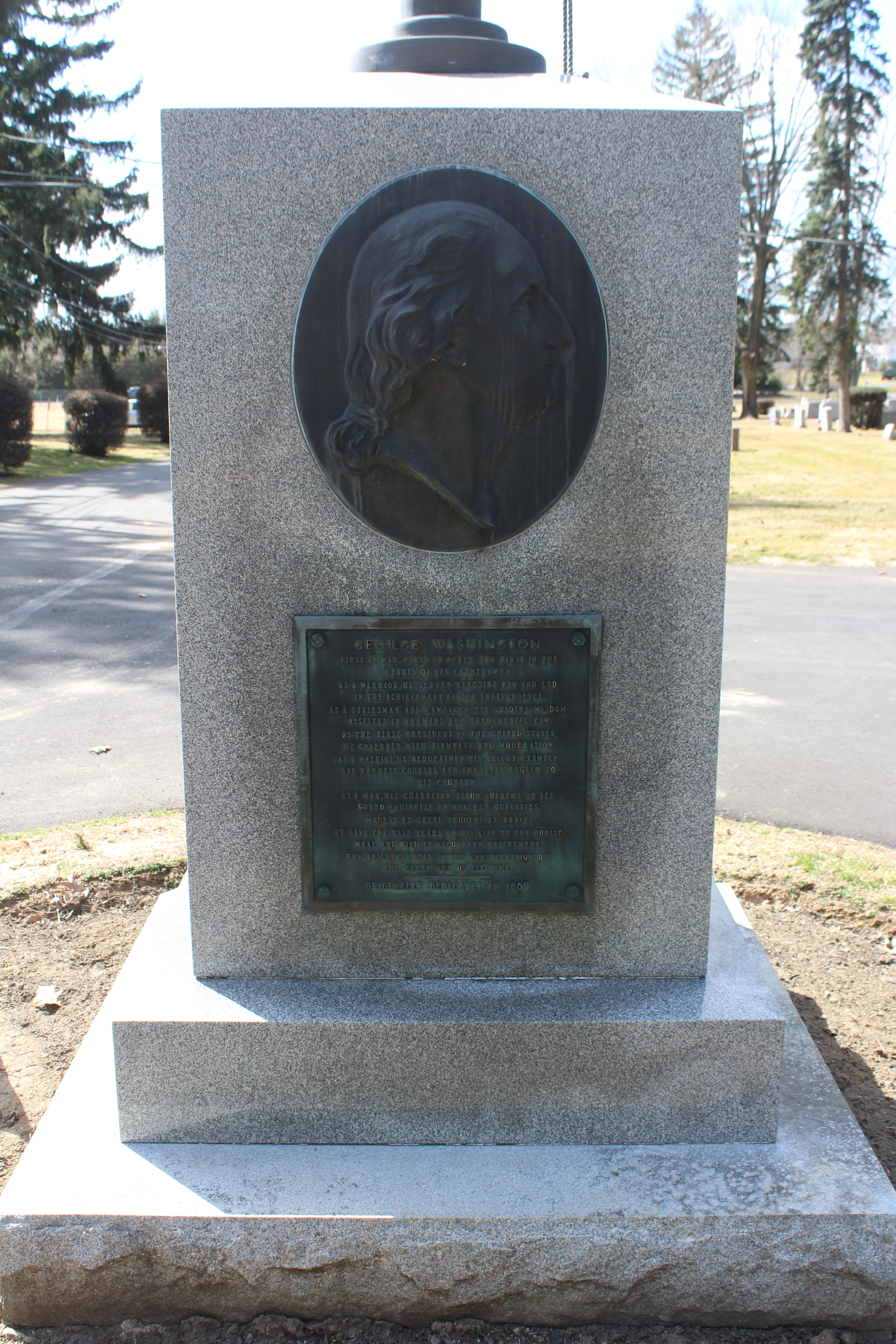
The bronze profile of George Washington originally from the memorial in Monument Cemetery in Philadelphia. It was originally dedicated in 1869 and moved to Lawnview Memorial Park in 1956
