= Monument Cemetery =

Defunct cemetery in Philadelphia, Pennsylvania, US

Coordinates: 39.981°N 75.153°W

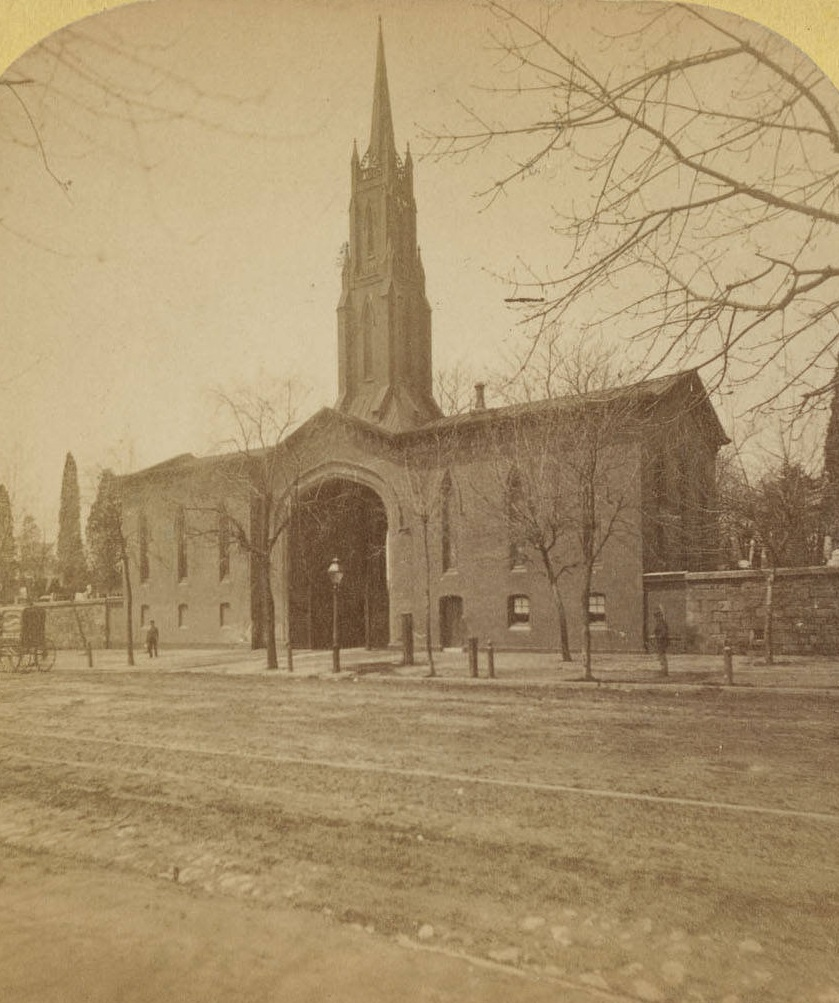
- The Gothic gatehouse to Monument Cemetery (circa 1868) was designed by John Sartain.
- Interactive map of Monument Cemetery

Details
- Established: 1837
- Location: Philadelphia, Pennsylvania
- Country: United States
- Type: private
- Size: 20 acres
- No. of graves: 28,000
- Find a Grave: Monument Cemetery

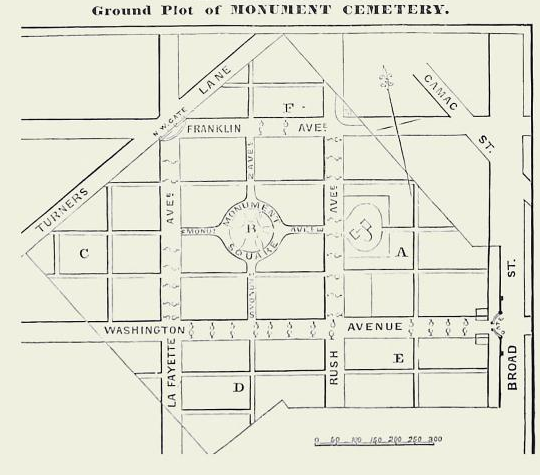
Map of cemetery circa 1839

Monument Cemetery was a rural cemetery located at the current day intersection of Broad and Berks Street in North Philadelphia, Pennsylvania, from 1837 to 1956. It was the second rural cemetery in Philadelphia after Laurel Hill Cemetery. It was approximately 20 acres in size and contained 28,000 burials. It had a grand gothic gatehouse and a 67-foot high obelisk monument to George Washington and the Marquis de Lafayette designed by John Sartain at the center of the cemetery.

By the 1950s, the cemetery had fallen into disrepair and was sold to Temple University and the Philadelphia Board of Education. Approximately 28,000 bodies were reinterred to Lawnview Memorial Park but only 300 with their original tombstones. Many of the remaining headstones, and the monument, were used as riprap during the construction of the Betsy Ross Bridge and can be seen on the shores of the Delaware River at low tide. The land is now part of the campus of Temple University and Carver High School.

== Description ==
The cemetery design was laid out in 1836 and 1837 by Dr. John A. Elkinton. The lot holders were incorporated on March 19, 1838 as the Monument Cemetery Company of Philadelphia. It was the second garden or rural cemetery in Philadelphia, after Laurel Hill Cemetery, and was based on Père Lachaise Cemetery in Paris. It was a 20-acre diamond shaped property located near the current day intersection of Broad and Berks Street. Originally intended to be called "Pere La Chaise", it was renamed Monument Cemetery based on a plan to include a monument in the center dedicated to George Washington and the Marquis de Lafayette.

The gatehouse, which also functioned as the chapel, was a gothic brownstone and brick structure topped with a towering spire. The gatehouse was demolished in 1903 to extend Berks Street.

== Monument to Washington and Lafayette ==
Designed by John Sartain, the monument was a 67-foot high obelisk adorned with nine-foot tall bronze medallions with profiles of Washington and Lafayette. The pedestal of the monument was 77 and a half square yards – which was intended to signify the 77 and half years that Lafayette lived. The height of the obelisk was 67 feet and 10 inches, intended to signify the 67 years and 10 months of Washington's life. Above the pedestal were thirteen steps intended to signify the original 13 colonies. 32 grooves (8 on each side) on the sub-shaft of the obelisk were intended to signify the number of states in the Union when the monument was erected.

Construction of the monument was delayed due to financial problems but it was eventually completed and dedicated on May 29, 1869.

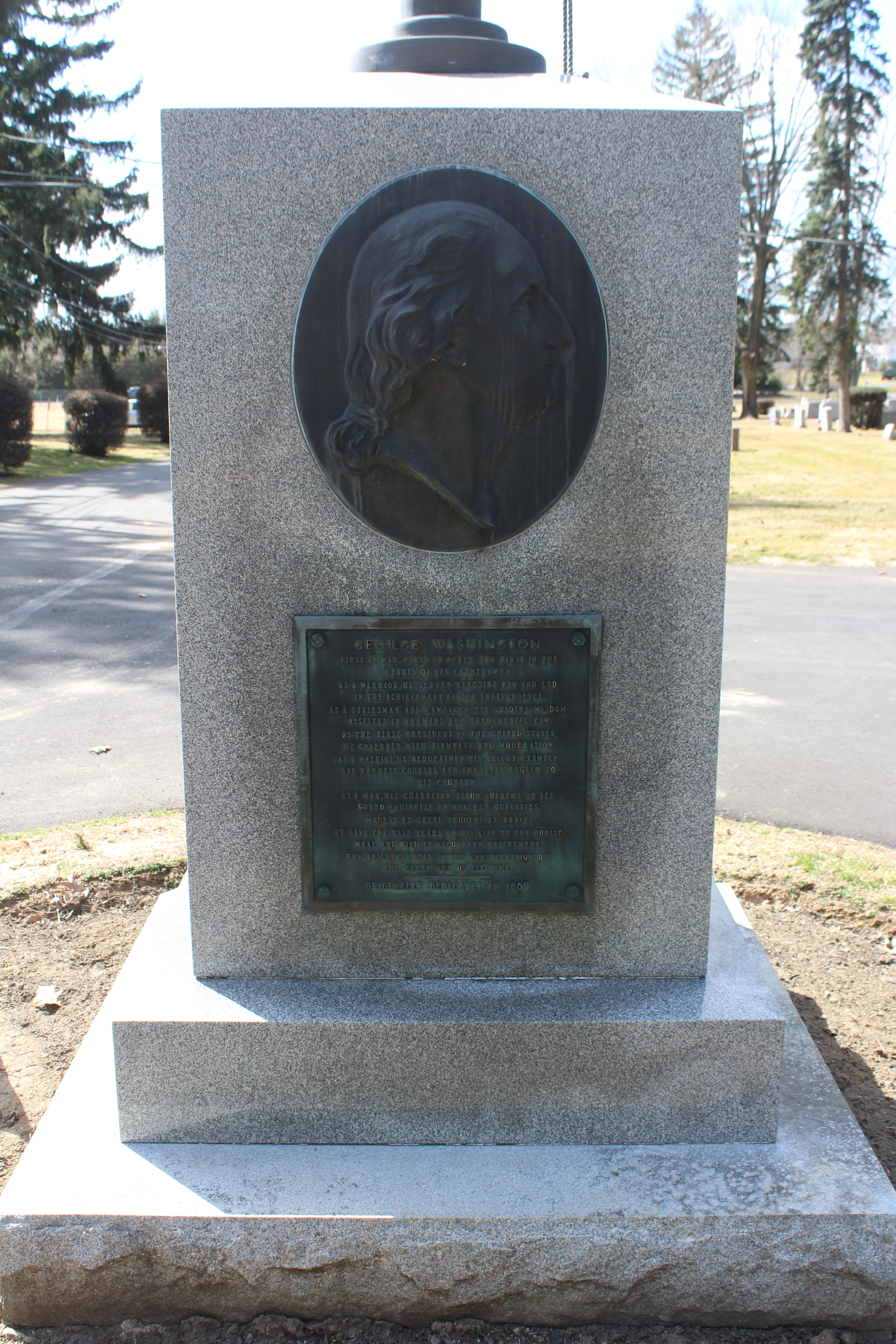
George Washington profile and memorial plaque in Lawnview Memorial Park where most of the bodies from Monument Cemetery were reinterred. Originally dedicated in 1869.

The bronze plaque dedicated to Washington contained the following inscription:

"Washington,
First in war, First in peace,
and
First in the hearts of his Countrymen,
As a Warrior,
He served refusing pay, and led in the achievement of our
Independence.
As a statesman and Law Giver,
His guiding wisdom assisted in framing the Constitutional
Law.
As first president of the U.S.,
He governed with firmness and moderation.
As a patriot, he bequeathed his bright example and
Earnest counsel and immortal legacy to his country.
As a man, his character stood superior in its grand
Equipoise of noblest Qualities.
Modest as great, prudent as wise,
He gave the best years of his life to the public weal, and
Died in Voluntary Retirement,
The Brightest Star in the constellation of the great men
Of all times."

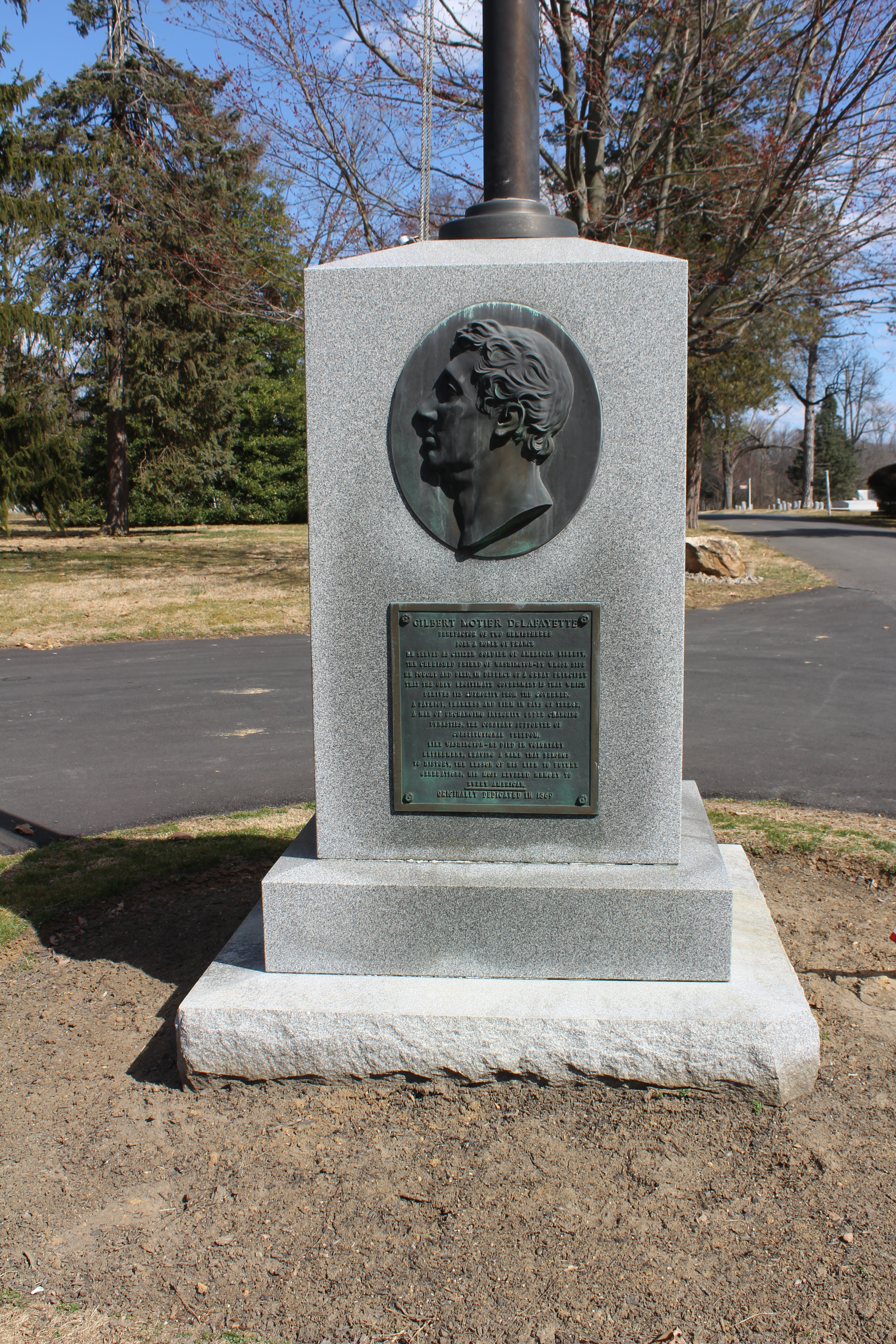
Marquis Lafayette Memorial in Lawnview Cemetery. Originally dedicated in 1869.

The bronze plaque dedicated to the Marquis de Lafayette contained the following inscription:

"Gilbert Motier De Lafayette,
Benefactor of two Hemispheres;
Born a Noble of France
He served as a citizen soldier of American
Liberty;
A cherished Friend of Washington,
By whose side he fought and Bled
In defence of the great principle
That the only legitimate government
Is that which derives its authority from the
Governed.
A patriot fearless and firm in days of Terror;
A man of unchanging Integrity under
Changing Dynasties;
The Constant supporter of Constitutional
Freedom;
Like Washington,
He died in voluntary Retirement,
Leaving a name that belongs to History,
The lesson of his life to future generations,
His most revered memory
To every American."

== Cemetery closure ==
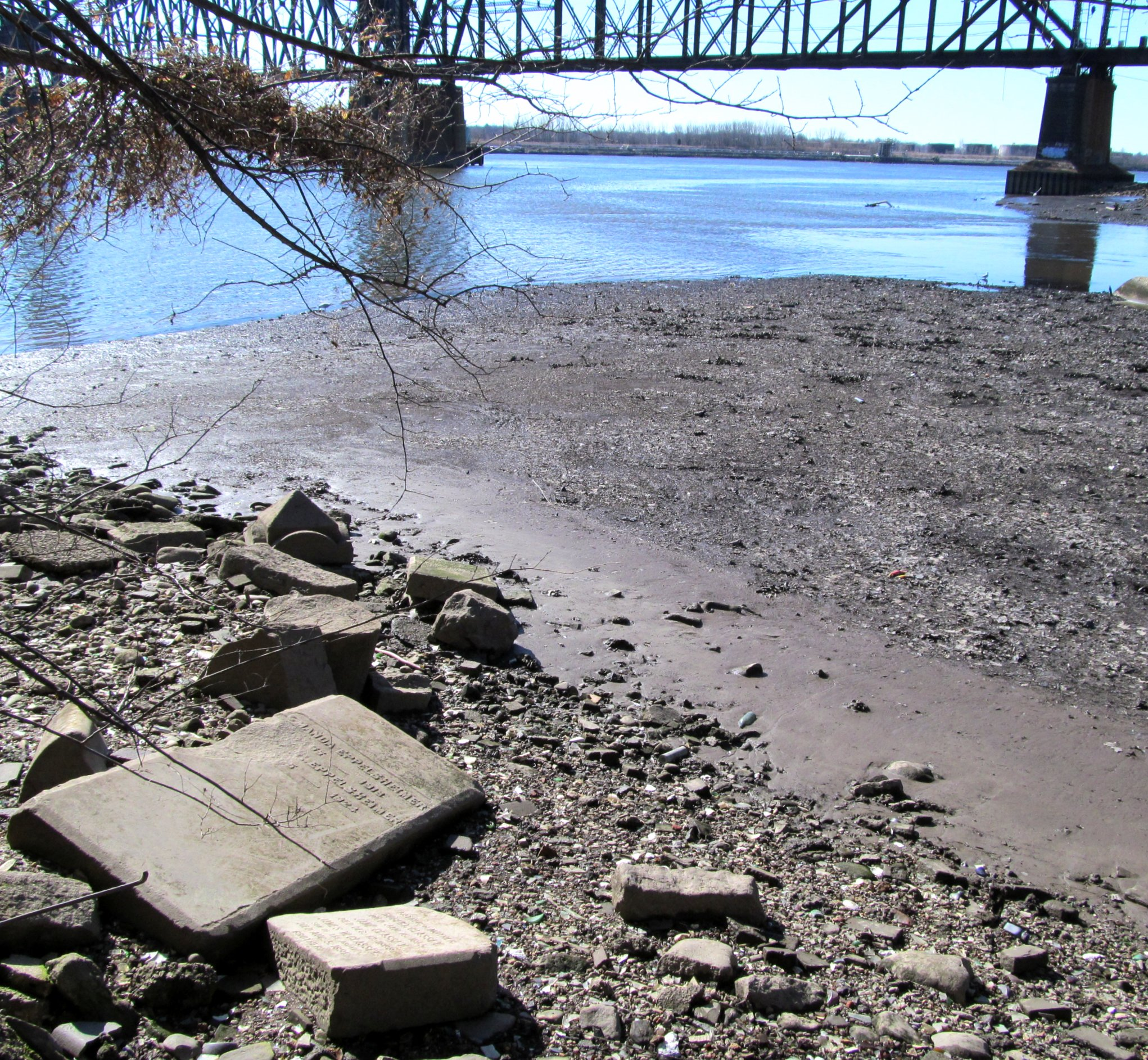
Tombstones from Monument Cemetery were used as riprap during the construction of the Betsy Ross Bridge and can be seen from the shore of the Delaware River at low tide.

Burials stopped by the late 1920s, and by the early 1950s the cemetery had fallen into disrepair. The cemetery suffered from crime and vandalism and became infested with rats. Temple University was interested in purchasing the cemetery and repurposing it for athletic fields and a parking lot. The management of Monument Cemetery objected to this usage of the cemetery and hoped to sell to another cemetery company. In 1954, Monument Cemetery finally agreed to terms to sell 11 1/2 acres of the cemetery to Temple University and the remainder to the Philadelphia Board of Education.

The University contacted 748 families about the cemetery closure. Approximately 28,000 bodies were reinterred to Lawnview Memorial Park with only 300 grave markers included in the move since families members were located. Most of the reinterments were placed in a mass grave. The process of relocating the bodies took four years to accomplish. The new graves are marked by flat markers, also known as grass markers. The original headstones were not used at the new grave sites. Most of the remaining headstones, and the monument to Washington and Lafayette, were used as riprap during the construction of the Betsy Ross Bridge and can be seen on the shores of the Delaware River at low tide. The land is currently used by Temple University for athletic fields, a student pavilion and a parking lot. The Board of Education used their lot as a playground for George Washington Carver High School.

== Notable burials ==
- DeWitt Clinton Baxter (1829–1881), artist, engraver, Union Army colonel and brevet brigadier general
- John Hull Campbell (1800–1868), U.S. Congressman
- Russell Conwell (1843–1925), founder of Temple University
- Thomas Birch Florence (1812–1875), U.S. Congressman
- Bill Fouser (1855–1919), professional baseball player
- Bushrod Washington James (1836-1903), surgeon, homeopath, writer, and philanthropist
- James Landy (1813–1875), U.S. Congressman
- Henry Dunning Moore (1817–1887), U.S. Congressman
- John Sartain (1808–1897), artist
- Hampton S. Thomas (1837–1899), U.S. Medal of Honor Awardee (American Civil War)
