= Hampton S. Thomas =

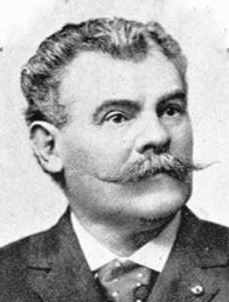
- Brevet Colonel Hampton S. Thomas, c. 1899
- Born: November 3, 1837; Quakertown, Pennsylvania, U.S.
- Died: May 21, 1899 (aged 61); Philadelphia, Pennsylvania, U.S.
- Burial place: Lawnview Memorial Park, Rockledge, Pennsylvania, U.S.
- Military career
- Allegiance: United States
- Branch: United States Army (Union Army)
- Rank: Major
- Unit: 1st Pennsylvania Cavalry
- Conflicts: American Civil War: Battle of Dranesville; Battle of Cedar Mountain; First Battle of Rappahannock Station; Battle of Fredericksburg; Stoneman's 1863 Raid; Battle of Brandy Station; Battle of Aldie; Battle of Upperville; Battle of Gettysburg; Battle of Culpeper Court House; Battle of Bristoe Station; Battle of Todd's Tavern; Overland Campaign; Battle of Yellow Tavern; Battle of Haw's Shop; Battle of Cold Harbor; Battle of Trevilian Station; Battle of Saint Mary's Church; Second Battle of Ream's Station; Battle of Dinwiddie Court House; Battle of Five Forks; Third Battle of Petersburg; Battle of Amelia Springs
- Awards: Medal of Honor

Hampton Sidney Thomas (November 3, 1837 – May 21, 1899) was a United States soldier who fought with the Union Army as a major in the 1st Pennsylvania Cavalry during the American Civil War. He received his country's highest award for valor, the Medal of Honor, for his "conspicuous gallantry" on April 5, 1865, in the Battle of Amelia Springs, Virginia during which he captured an artillery battery and several enemy flags while also helping to destroy a wagon train of the Confederate States Army. The award was conferred on January 15, 1894.

== Formative years ==
Born in Quakertown, Pennsylvania, on November 3, 1837, Hampton Sidney Thomas was a son of David Thomas, M.D. and Jesse (Baker) Thomas. Reared, during his formative years, in the greater Philadelphia area, he was educated in his community's public schools, and then chose to pursue the trade of carpentry during his teen years.

In 1860, Thomas apprenticed with master carpenter Franklin Ashley in Oxford, Pennsylvania, and also resided with Ashley and his family at this time.

== Civil War ==
A resident of Chester County at the dawn of the American Civil War, Hampton S. Thomas became one of Pennsylvania's earliest responders to President Abraham Lincoln's call for volunteers to help defend Washington, D.C. following the mid-April 1861 fall of Fort Sumter to troops from the Confederate States Army. Enrolling for military service on April 21 at the age of 23 in West Chester, Pennsylvania, Thomas then officially mustered in for duty the next day at Harrisburg as a third corporal with Company E of the 9th Pennsylvania Infantry. Following the completion of his Three Months' Service, he was honorably discharged with his regiment on July 29.

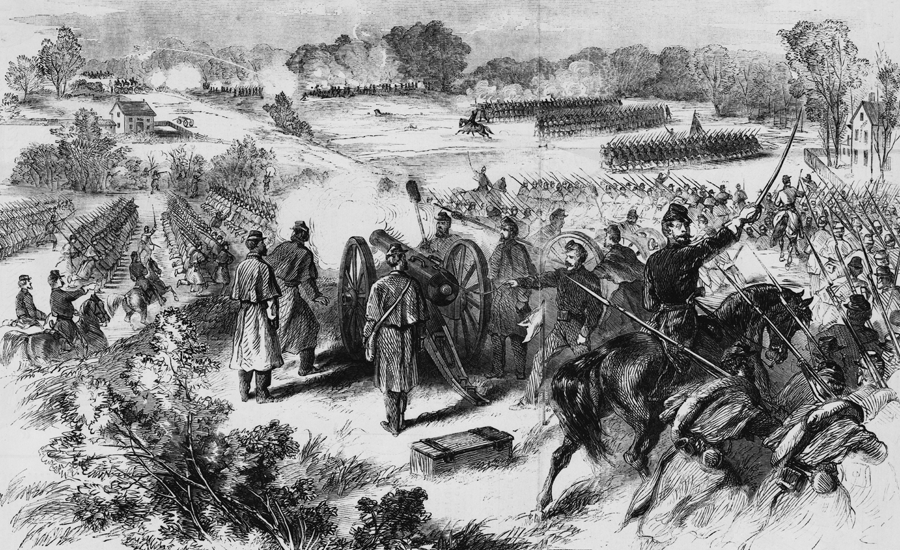
Battle of Dranesville, Virginia, December 20, 1861 (Frank Leslie's Illustrated Newspaper, January 11, 1862).

Two days later, Thomas re-enlisted. Enrolling this time for a three-year term at Harrisburg on July 31, he mustered in at Camp Curtin on August 1, and was commissioned as a second lieutenant with Company G of the 1st Pennsylvania Cavalry that same day. Transported to the Eastern theater of battle, he and his regiment were then attached to the U.S. Army of the Potomac. On September 27, he was recommissioned as a first lieutenant. Engaged with his regiment in skirmishing near Dranesville, Virginia on November 26, Thomas and his fellow 1st Cavalrymen received their first taste of combat while supporting a Union artillery battery during the Battle of Dranesville on December 20. Assigned to scouting and defensive duties during the spring of 1862, they patrolled the areas around Catlett's Station, the Orange and Alexandria Railroad, Warrenton, and Rappahannock Station. Appointed in April 1862 as assistant adjutant-general of the 1st Brigade under his former regimental commander, George Dashiell Bayard, who had been commissioned as Chief of Cavalry of III Corps (Union Army), Thomas and his men captured the town of Falmouth after chasing off the enemy during an early morning charge on April 18. As a result of their success, Bayard was commissioned as brigadier-general of U.S. Volunteers on April 28, and Thomas was commissioned as a captain on May 5, and placed in charge of Company M. He and his men were then assigned to picket and scout details south of Fredericksburg, and advance guard and scouting details which supported the movements of Union Army commanding generals Irvin McDowell and George B. McClellan that spring and early summer. Crossing the Shenandoah River, they then helped to cut off the movements of Confederate General Stonewall Jackson's men near Strasburg, and supported Pennsylvania's "Bucktails" in their fight against CSA troops near Harrisonburg on June 6 before moving on to Port Republic. Standing in readiness, they next witnessed but did not engage in the Battle of Cross Keys (June 8). Assigned again to picket and scout duties, their next combat engagements came in the Battle of Cedar Mountain (August 8), First Battle of Rappahannock Station (August 20–25), and the Second Battle of Bull Run (August 28–30). Engaged next in the defense of Washington, D.C., Thomas and his men then resumed duties in support of McClellan's troops, engaging with the enemy in minor skirmishes and major charges throughout the fall. During the Battle of Fredericksburg (December 11–15), they suffered heavily under intense fire from enemy artillery and infantry, losing a number of their current and former members, including Bayard who asked, after being mortally wounded, that David McMurtrie Gregg be placed in command of the brigade.

Appointed by Brigadier General Gregg as an inspector-general on the staff of the 1st Brigade on April 1, 1863, Thomas participated with the brigade in Stoneman's 1863 raid and then, that summer, led his 1st Pennsylvania Cavalrymen and two companies of the 1st Maryland Cavalry Regiment in the recapture of Union artillery at Fleetwood Hill during the Battle of Brandy Station, Virginia on June 9 as Union forces engaged those of Confederate General J.E.B. Stuart. In a memoir penned in 1889, Thomas recalled what happened that day:

General Gregg was so unfortunate as to lose three guns of the Sixth New York Light Battery through the recklessness of Colonel Percy Wyndham, who commanded my brigade. The latter had ordered the battery to follow the First New Jersey Cavalry in a charge, and go into position on the crest of Fleetwood Hill, to the left of the Barbour House. Just as the guns were swung into position and unlimbered the enemy made a countercharge, driving back a broken squadron of the First New Jersey and a detachment of the First Pennsylvania Cavalry, both of which passed through the battery to the rear. The men in charge of the limbers were swept back in the confusion. The dust was so thick it was almost impossible to tell a Reb from a Yank. I sent my orderly to the rear to find the limbers and have the guns taken back to their original position, in the open field, to the right of Brandy Station. In a few moments two squadrons of the First Maryland Cavalry came trotting through the dust.... I told him to follow me at a gallop, or there would not be any battery to support. As we emerged from the dust we could see the cannoneers dragging the guns by hand down the hill, followed by a large body of the enemy firing their revolvers. We at once charged the enemy, clearing the crest of the hill, and driving them back through their own battery.... I took back at a gallop the few of us who kept together, and began searching for the guns. I found the pieces, but lost the Marylanders.... The guns had been drawn down to the base of the hill, and while I was trying to collect some men together for the purpose of having them hauled away, a heavy column of rebel cavalry came charging around the corner of the house, with their battle-flag in advance. One of the guns happened to have a round of cannister in it. The sergeant in command of the piece pointed it towards the charging column, fired, and repulsed them within forty yards of us. The head of this column was badly cut up, leaving a number of horses and men, and the battle-flag, on the slope of the hill.... [Refused help from the First Maine to protect the recaptured battery, Thomas] rode back and told the few cannoneers that were left to save themselves by crossing the railroad, and go over to the woods, where they would find some of our infantry. I remained with the guns, in hopes of our command returning ... until another column of rebel cavalry came trotting down the hill.... I politely raised my cap to them and rapidly rode away.

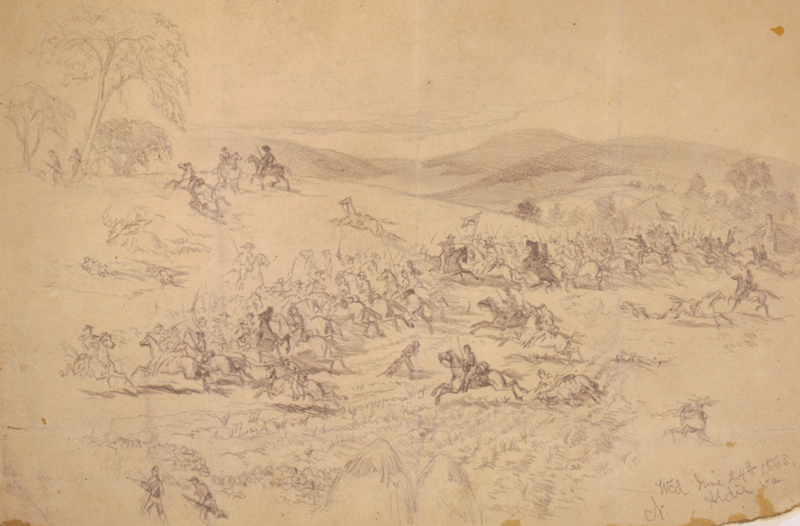
Battle of Aldie, Virginia, June 17, 1863 (Edwin Foote).

On June 17, Thomas fought with his brigade in the Battle of Aldie, driving Confederate cavalrymen into and, over the next several days, beyond Middleburg. They then clashed again in the Battle of Upperville, and attacked the rear of Stuart's army near Westminster (June 30) before heading for Manchester, Hanover Junction, and on into Adams County, Pennsylvania. While fighting with his regiment in day three of the Battle of Gettysburg, Pennsylvania on July 3, 1863, Thomas led a charge of Union men on the left side of 12,500 Confederate cavalrymen and infantry troops, engaging in a "hacking" battle with the enemy and helping to inspire the CSA to retreat, according to historians Edward Longacre and Thomas Holbrook. Recalling the day's events in his 1889 memoir, Thomas noted that:

The rebel general J.E.B. Stuart came upon the field early on the morning of July 3, with about seven thousand men under him. After he had made disposition of his command on or near the Stallsmith farm, about three miles east of Gettysburg, he caused several random shots to be fired in various directions. This firing was no doubt prearranged with Lee, signaling that his position was favorable and that he was ready to move in conjunction with Pickett to strike our infantry in rear. Colonel McIntosh, on whose brigade staff I was serving, concluded that something was up, and, having relieved a portion of Custer's Michigan Brigade, he ordered an advance of our line dismounted. This movement ... brought on the engagement before Stuart expected, and exposed his whole design. Gregg, seeing the situation, recalled Custer... He then put in position all of his artillery, under cover of a wheat-field, ordering the guns to be double-shotted with canister... Our dismounted lines were refused in the centre, in front of the artillery, forming an inverse wedge. After we held them back for about an hour, heavy bodies of the rebel cavalry burst into view over a rise of ground. They came on in magnificent style. It was terribly grand to witness. In two parllel columns, charging in squadron front, little knowing what was awaiting them, they came on, yelling and looking like demons. Canister and percussion-shell were poured into them until they reached within one hundred yards of our guns. Then our bold Custer came dashing over the field at the head of the First Michigan Cavalry, with his yellow locks flying and his long sabre brandishing through the air... In the mean time the dismounted men poured in a withering fire with their carbines upon both flanks of the rebel columns... The enemy's horses climbing over each other, rearing and plunging, many of their men being struck in the back by the fore feet of the horses in their rear. Then McIntosh and his staff charged with their orderlies, sabring right and left. Such a horrible din it was, amid the clashing of sabres and continuous roll of the small-arms and the curses and demands to surrender. [Quoting from another source, Thomas added that, as the Confederate Column stood its ground]: "Captain Thomas, of the staff, seeing that a little more was needed to turn the tide, cut his way over to the woods on the right, where he knew he could find Hart, who had remounted his squadron of the First New Jersey. In the melee, near the colors, was an officer of high rank, and the two headed the squadron for that part of the fight. They came within reach of them with their sabres, and then it was that [Confederate brigadier-general] Wade Hampton was wounded."

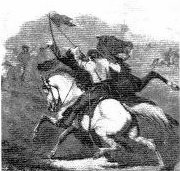
Battle of Yellow Tavern, Virginia, May 11, 1864.

After multiple subsequent charges, according to Thomas, the Confederate cavalrymen were forced into retreat. Assigned to picket duties the next day, Thomas and his troops were then ordered to pursue the retreating Confederate Army into Maryland and Virginia. After Thomas and his regiment re-engaged with the enemy near Shepherdstown (July 15) and in the Battle of Culpeper Court House (September 13), he was detailed to oversee the federal elections voting in early October by members of the 6th Ohio Cavalry. He was then hospitalized for three months after being wounded severely during the Battle of Bristoe Station (October 14). His first major engagement, after returning from his convalescence in 1864, was the Battle of Todd's Tavern (May 7, 1864). Attached again to brigade staff of Henry Eugene Davies, he led his men in a cavalry charge on the enemy to rescue Davies and two of his officers that day after they had been captured. Thomas and his men were then assigned with their brigade to the Union's Overland Campaign, fighting in the Battle of Yellow Tavern (May 11), a key engagement in which Confederate general J.E.B. Stuart was mortally wounded, and then under Major-General Philip H. Sheridan during his raid on Richmond. After rejoining the Army of the Potomac later in May, they then fought in the battles of Haw's Shop (May 28), Cold Harbor (May 31 – June 12), Trevilian Station (June 11–12), and Saint Mary's Church (June 24). During the Second Battle of Ream's Station (August 25), Thomas was severely injured again, this time during a fall as his horse was shot and killed. While he was recuperating at home during a 30-day medical furlough, he received word that he would be transferred, effective September 18, 1864, to the artillery battery of his regiment's M Company. Also relieved of his brigade staff assignment, he resumed leadership duties with the 1st Pennsylvania Cavalry on October 1. His regiment then re-engaged with the enemy off and on for the remaining months of that year.

Commissioned as a major of the regiment on January 4, 1865, Thomas next led his men on a mission in early March to rid the Blackwater Swamp area of unaffiliated highwaymen who had murdered Union soldiers while they were on picket duty. That assignment completed, he reported to City Point, per Sheridan's order, to assume command of a newly formed cavalry unit, and then led his men in the battles of Dinwiddie Court House (March 31) and Five Forks (April 1) and in operations along the South Side Railroad as part of the Third Battle of Petersburg (April 2).

Having previously been brevetted as a lieutenant colonel for his meritorious service, Thomas was then brevetted again on April 5, 1865, this time at the rank of colonel in recognition of his actions in combat that day during the Battle of Amelia Springs — actions which would also result in his being awarded the U.S. Medal of Honor. Recalling the events in his 1889 memoir, Thomas wrote:

About one o'clock that night, as we lay to horse, the First Pennsylvania Cavalry was ordered to mount and report to General Sheridan at once... I found General Crook (who was now in command of Gregg's old division) and General Davies overlooking a map. I was shown the position where the enemy were supposed to be, near Amelia Court-House, and was instructed to proceed with my regiment about two or three miles in advance of our brigade, press through all small detachments, and attack the enemy's wagon-train at daylight. We reached some high ground just as the sun was rising, and below at our feet lay the whole rebel army in line of battle, apparently sound asleep... Here instructions were given to the men that when the charge was sounded by the bugles they should yell like demons and tell all the rebels they met, particularly the officers, that Sheridan and all his cavalry corps were upon them. This regiment with its three hundred veterans charged through a number of outlying commands, destroying about three hundred wagons, cutting out twelve hundred head of horses and mules, capturing eight hundred prisoners, eleven rebel battle-flags, and a bright, new spick-and-span battery of Armstrong field-guns... We held our ground and captures until General Davies came to our relief, which he did very promptly.

Thomas and his men then reconnected with the Union's main command. When Sheridan and other officers came under sudden attack around 5 p.m. that afternoon while inspecting the enemy flags that had been captured earlier, Thomas and his men checked the Confederate attack, resorting to hand-to-hand combat with pistols and sabres in order to protect their own regimental colors. Once again, Thomas was grievously wounded when his horse was shot and killed. This time, however, Thomas was forced to undergo amputation of part of his leg (below the knee) when a Union Army surgeon determined that his leg bone had been shattered beyond repair by a carbine ball.

Transferred to the field and staff officers' corps of the 2nd Provisional Cavalry on June 17, 1865, after successfully recuperating from his injuries, Thomas then honorably mustered out with that regiment at Louisville, Kentucky on August 7, 1865.

== Post-war life ==
Following his honorable discharge from the cavalry, Thomas returned home to the Philadelphia area, and found work as a coal dealer. Sometime around 1866, he and his wife, Sallie, welcomed the birth of a daughter, Mary, followed, respectively in 1868 and 1869, by daughter Lillian and son Philip. During the late 1860s and early 1870s, Thomas also served as the sergeant-at-arms of the Pennsylvania Senate; as the register of wills in West Chester (1874–1877), where he had resided since at least 1870; as the superintendent of the Philadelphia Almshouse (until 1880); as a collector of delinquent taxes; and then magistrate of the 28th district police court in Philadelphia. A member of the Masonic Lodge in Oxford, he was also active with the Grand Army of the Republic and the Republican Party.

He and his wife, Sallie, then welcomed the birth of another son, Bayerd G., in July 1888, who lived just eight weeks. In 1889, Thomas published accounts of his war-time activities. Entitled Some Personal Reminiscences of Service in the Cavalry of the Army of the Potomac, the first work was published in The United Service in January; the second was published later that year by L.R. Hamersly & Co., a Philadelphia-based publisher.

A resident of Philadelphia in 1895, Thomas was still serving as a magistrate in that city during the late 1890s. While conducting a hearing in the Manayunk Police Court on May 9, 1899, he suffered a severe episode of vertigo, the third such attack he had experienced. Taken to his home at 2532 Aspen Street, Thomas was diagnosed by his physician as terminal, and died at his home two weeks later on May 21, 1899. Following a military funeral on June 5, he was buried at Philadelphia's Monument Cemetery. When that cemetery was closed and the land sold during the 1950s, his remains were removed and reinterred at the Lawnview Memorial Park in Rockledge.

== Medal of Honor citation ==
The President of the United States of America, in the name of Congress, takes pleasure in presenting the Medal of Honor to Major Hampton Sidney Thomas, United States Army, for extraordinary heroism on April 5, 1865, while serving with 1st Pennsylvania Veteran Cavalry, in action at Amelia Springs, Virginia. For conspicuous gallantry in the capture of a field battery and a number of battle flags and in the destruction of the enemy's wagon train. Major Thomas lost a leg in this action.

== See also ==
- List of American Civil War Medal of Honor recipients: T–Z
- Pennsylvania in the Civil War
