= American Republican Party (1843) =

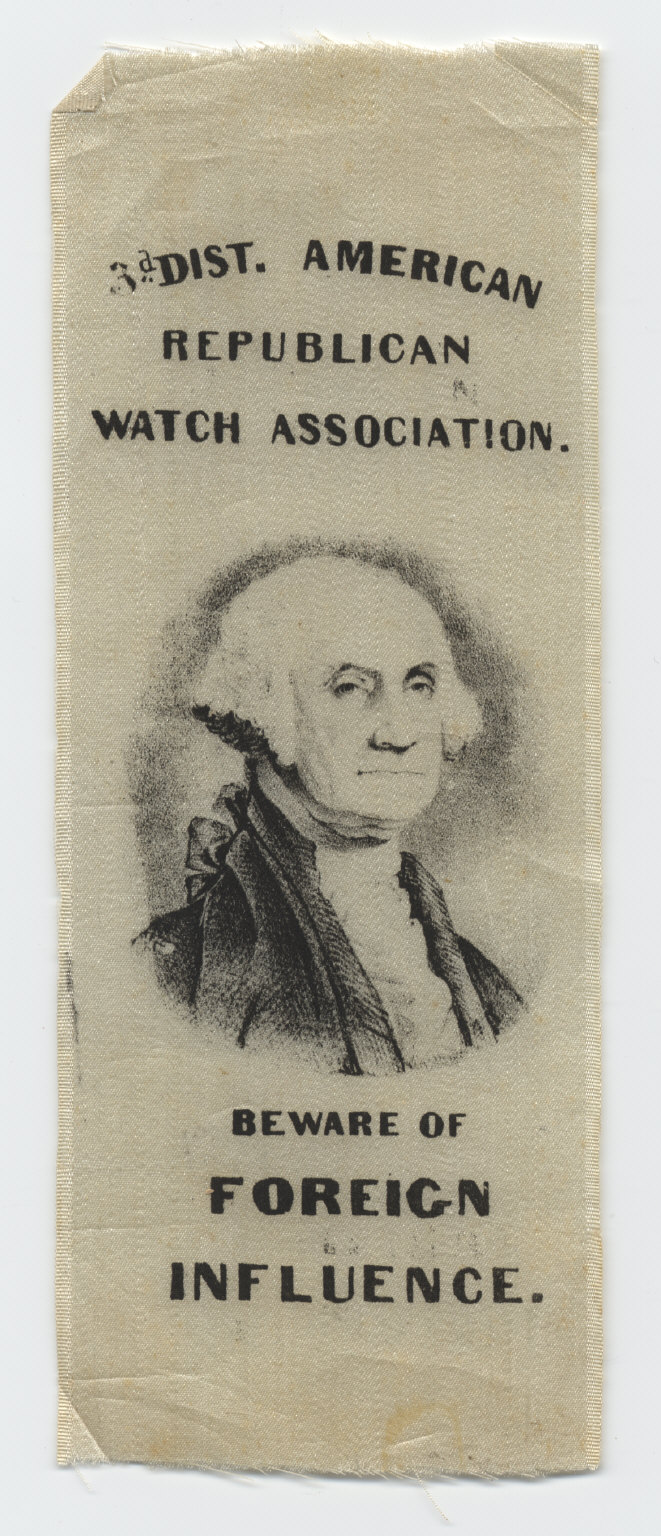
- Third District American Republican Watch Association Ribbon
- Founded: 1843; 183 years ago
- Dissolved: 1845; 181 years ago
- Preceded by: Whig Party
- Merged into: Native American Party
- Headquarters: New York City
- Ideology: American nationalism; Anti-Catholicism; Anti-Irish sentiment; Anti-German sentiment; Anti-immigration; Nativism; Republicanism; Right-wing populism
- Political position: Far-right
- Religion: Protestantism
- Colors: Red White Blue (American flag colors)

The American Republican Party was a minor anti-Catholic, anti-immigration, and nativist political organization that was launched in New York in July 1843, largely as a protest against immigrant voters and officeholders.

In 1844, the American Republican Party carried municipal elections in New York City and Philadelphia and expanded so rapidly that by July 1845 a national convention was called. This convention changed the name to the Native American Party and drafted a legislative program calling for a 21-year period preceding naturalization and other sweeping reforms in the immigration policy of the United States, as well as mandating the use of the Protestant King James Bible in public schools.

Despite some initial success of the party, it lost public support following the Philadelphia nativist riots of 1844 during which American Republican Party members were involved in burning down two Catholic churches.

Its founders included Lewis Charles Levin, Samuel Kramer, "General" Peter Sken Smith, James Wallace, and John Gitron.

== See also ==
- Free Soil Party
- Know Nothing Party
- The Crisis!: An Appeal to Our Countrymen, on the Subject of Foreign Influence in the United States!, a book published by the General Executive Committee of the American Republican Party in 1844 to describe the organization's anti-immigrant message.

== Sources ==
- Adams, James Truslow. Dictionary of American History, New York: Charles Scribner's Sons, 1940.
