= James Landy =

American politician

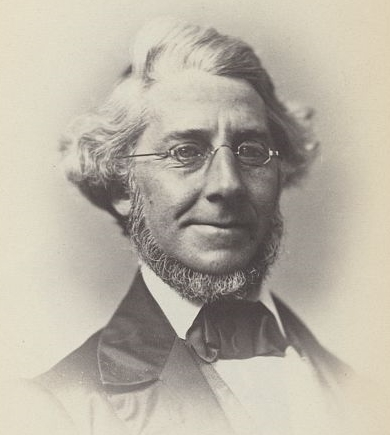
- Landy in 1859

Member of the U.S. House of Representatives from Pennsylvania's 3rd district
- In office March 4, 1857 – March 3, 1859
- Preceded by: William Millward
- Succeeded by: John P. Verree

Personal details
- Born: October 13, 1813 Philadelphia, Pennsylvania, US
- Died: July 25, 1875 (aged 61) Philadelphia, Pennsylvania, US
- Resting place: Lawnview Memorial Park, Rockledge, Pennsylvania, US
- Party: Democratic

James Landy (October 13, 1813 – July 25, 1875) was a Democratic member of the U.S. House of Representatives from Pennsylvania.

== Biography ==
James Landy was born in Northern Liberties District in Philadelphia, Pennsylvania. He attended the public schools and studied law, but abandoned it later and engaged in mercantile pursuits. He was a member of the board of school commissioners in 1845.

Landy was elected as a Democrat to the Thirty-fifth Congress. He was an unsuccessful candidate for reelection in 1858. He was elected chief commissioner of highways in 1862. He died in Philadelphia in 1875. Originally interred in Monument Cemetery, he was reburied in Lawnview Cemetery in 1956.

U.S. House of Representatives
Preceded by William Millward	Member of the U.S. House of Representatives from Pennsylvania's 3rd congressional district 1857–1859	Succeeded by John P. Verree
