= Lewis Charles Levin =

American politician (1808–1860)

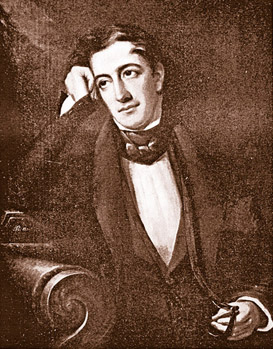

Member of the U.S. House of Representatives from Pennsylvania's 1st district
- In office March 4, 1845 – March 3, 1851
- Preceded by: Edward J. Morris
- Succeeded by: Thomas B. Florence

Personal details
- Born: November 10, 1808 Charleston, South Carolina, U.S.
- Died: March 14, 1860 (aged 51) Philadelphia, Pennsylvania, U.S.
- Resting place: Laurel Hill Cemetery, Philadelphia, Pennsylvania, U.S.
- Party: American Republican Party; American Party
- Spouse(s): Ann Hays; Julia Gist
- Children: Louisa
- Profession: Politician

Lewis Charles Levin (November 10, 1808 – March 14, 1860) was an American politician, newspaper editor and anti-Catholic social activist. He was one of the founders of the American Party in 1842 and served as a member of the U. S. House of Representatives representing Pennsylvania's 1st congressional district from 1845 to 1851. Levin was the second person of Jewish descent elected to the United States Congress after David Levy Yulee.

Levin supported the nativist Americanism ideology espoused by some northern Protestants at the expense of Catholics. He was a dynamic orator on temperance and political issues; however, many of his speeches spread xenophobia. Levin played a leading role in inciting the Philadelphia nativist riots which led to the killing of over 20 Irish Americans; the burning of many of their homes; and the destruction of three Catholic churches associated with their community. Towards the end of his life, he was deemed insane and committed to an asylum and died in Philadelphia in 1860.

== Early life and education ==
Levin was born on November 10, 1808, in Charleston, South Carolina to Jewish parents who had emigrated from England. He attended South Carolina College (later the University of South Carolina) but appears to have left without a degree. He worked in a dry goods store in Columbia and became a school master in Cincinnati, Ohio. He briefly taught school in Woodville, Mississippi, but left town after being wounded in a duel. Levin lived in Vicksburg, Mississippi; Nashville, Tennessee and Baltimore, Maryland. He began to refer to him self as L.C. Levin, Esq. and practice law but it is not clear what legal training he received or if he passed the bar.

== Anti-Catholic activism ==
By 1838 Levin was in Philadelphia and giving public lectures on the evils of alcohol. He founded and edited a journal called the Temperance Advocate and Literary Repository. In 1842 he staged an immense public "bonfire of booze" to draw attention to his campaign against taverns and for local control of liquor licensing.

Levin's anti-alcohol crusade proved to be excellent preparation for his next cause, a campaign against Catholic political power, which he carried on as editor of The Daily Sun. Initially, the main political issue was an 1843 public school ruling permitting Catholic children to be excused from Bible-reading class (because the Protestant King James Version was being used). Levin became the leader and chief spokesman for a start-up political movement calling itself the American Republican Party (later the Native American Party).

Levin also railed against Daniel O'Connell, the Irish politician, and his Repeal Association movement to repeal Ireland's union with England and Scotland known as the 1800 Act of Union. O'Connell looked to draw upon the Irish immigrants and implemented Repeal Clubs throughout America. Levin proposed that these clubs were in fact beachheads for Catholic power and were being used to support an eventual papal takeover of the United States.

On May 3, 1844, nativists attempted to give a speech in the center of the Irish-Catholic neighborhood of the Third Ward, Kensington. The locals ended up chasing all of the protesters out of the neighborhood. The following Monday, May 6, Levin returned with 3,000 protesters. The ensuing fighting led to several people killed and injured, and hundreds more left homeless as most of the neighborhood homes were burned by rioters. In addition the Catholic Churches St. Michael and St. Augustine were demolished completely by fire.

New riots broke out in Southwark in July of that same year when a group of protesters threatened to destroy / St. Philip Neri Catholic Church. This time Levin used his influence to prevent the mob from burning the church. Following the July riots, Levin and his colleague Samuel R. Kramer (publisher of the Native American) were arrested for "exciting to riot and treason" in inciting locals to invade and burn several Catholic churches and a convent. However, the case never went to trial.

== Political career ==
Levin was one of the founders of the American Party in 1842.

Shortly after the 1844 Philadelphia riots, Levin ran for Congress and was elected on his party's platform: (1) to extend the period of naturalization to twenty-one years; (2) to elect only native born to all offices; (3) to reject foreign interference in all institutions, social, religious, and political. He was the first Jewish member elected to the United States House of Representatives.

Levin was returned to Congress in 1846 and 1848. He served as chairman of the United States House Committee on Engraving during the Thirtieth Congress, 1847–48.

After leaving Congress in 1851, Levin continued to campaign for the Native American or Know-Nothing movement, as it became known. He attempted to campaign for U.S. Senator, which was a seat elected by the state legislature rather than by popular vote. Levin was accused of bribing members of the Pennsylvania Assembly and was subpoenaed by a state investigation in February 1855.

Levin and other Nativists helped tilt the 1852 Presidential election toward Democrat Franklin Pierce and away from the Whigs' candidate, the popular Mexican–American War leader General Winfield Scott. There were Catholics in Scott's family, and he was accused of papist connections. Though in notably failing health, he was a featured speaker at the American Order's rally in October 1855 in a New York City park.

Levin was enraged and disgusted by the new Republican Party's nomination of John C. Frémont for president at the convention in Philadelphia in June 1856. He wrote a lengthy diatribe against Frémont, which he delivered at a rally in Philadelphia's National Hall shortly after Millard Fillmore had been nominated by both the Know Nothings and the Whigs. However, Frémont partisans pulled him off the stand.

=== Electoral history ===
Pennsylvania's 1st congressional district election, 1844
| Party | Candidate | Votes | % |
|---|---|---|---|
| American Republican Party (1843) | Lewis C. Levin | 3,815 | 42.58 |
| Democratic | George F. Lehman | 2,754 | 30.74 |
| Whig | Edward Joy Morris (incumbent) | 2,217 | 24.74 |
| | Scattering | 174 | 1.94 |
| Total votes | | 8,960 | 100 |
| American Republican Party (1843) gain from Whig | | | |

Pennsylvania's 1st congressional district election, 1846
| Party | Candidate | Votes | % |
|---|---|---|---|
| Native American Party | Lewis C. Levin (incumbent) | 3,574 | 39.47 |
| Democratic | Thomas B. Florence | 3,143 | 34.71 |
| Whig | Edward Joy Morris | 2,339 | 25.83 |
| Total votes | | 9,056 | 100 |
| American Republican Party (1843) hold | | | |

Pennsylvania's 1st congressional district election, 1848
| Party | Candidate | Votes | % |
|---|---|---|---|
| Native American Party | Lewis C. Levin (incumbent) | 4,897 | 51.89 |
| Democratic | Thomas B. Florence | 4,228 | 44.80 |
| Independent | David P. Brown | 162 | 1.72 |
| Whig | Morton A. Stule | 75 | 0.80 |
| Whig | Joseph R. Chandler | 50 | 0.53 |
| Democratic | James C. Van Dyke | 25 | 0.27 |
| Total votes | | 9,437 | 100 |
| American Republican Party (1843) hold | | | |

Pennsylvania's 1st congressional district election, 1850
| Party | Candidate | Votes | % |
|---|---|---|---|
| Democratic | Thomas B. Florence | 5,352 | 52.86 |
| Native American Party | Lewis C. Levin (incumbent) | 4,164 | 41.13 |
| Whig | Peleg B. Savery | 609 | 6.02 |
| Total votes | | 10,125 | 100 |
| Democratic gain from American Republican Party (1843) | | | |

Pennsylvania's 1st congressional district election, 1852
| Party | Candidate | Votes | % |
|---|---|---|---|
| Democratic | Thomas B. Florence (incumbent) | 4,937 | 44.52 |
| Whig | William S. Price | 3,200 | 28.86 |
| Native American Party | Lewis C. Levin | 2,953 | 26.63 |
| Total votes | | 11,090 | 100 |
| Democratic hold | | | |

== Personal life ==
Levin's exact family tree is difficult to determine. He was the brother of Lipman Theodore (L. T.) Levin, listed in 1861 as a member of the Richland Rifles. L. T.'s funeral in 1892 was attended by his brother, Nathaniel, thus showing Lewis C., L. T., and Nathaniel to be brothers.

Levin married Ann Christian Hays (b. 1812) of Virginia and Tennessee in January 1833. Ann was related by marriage to future Tennessee governor and US President James K. Polk (her uncle John Hays was married to Polk's younger sister Ophelia). Ann died a year later, in January 1834. Levin then married a young widow named Julia Ann Gist, née Hammond (1814–1881) in Baltimore. Levin claimed to have met Julia while they were both shopping for tombstones for their late spouses.

Levin never hid his religious identity and was self-described as "by descent an Israelite and maintained a belief in Judaism throughout his life", however he was an advocate for Protestantism, though he privately rejected some of its tenets like the Virgin birth and the divinity of Jesus and his first marriage was officiated by an Episcopal priest and his second marriage by a Protestant priest.

In addition to Julia's daughter from her first marriage, Lewis and Julia Levin had one child, a daughter called Louisa (1840–1919). (It is occasionally reported erroneously that there was a son named Louis.)

== Insanity and death ==
According to newspaper reports, Levin had a complete mental collapse and became so "deranged" that he was placed in the Philadelphia Hospital for the Insane.

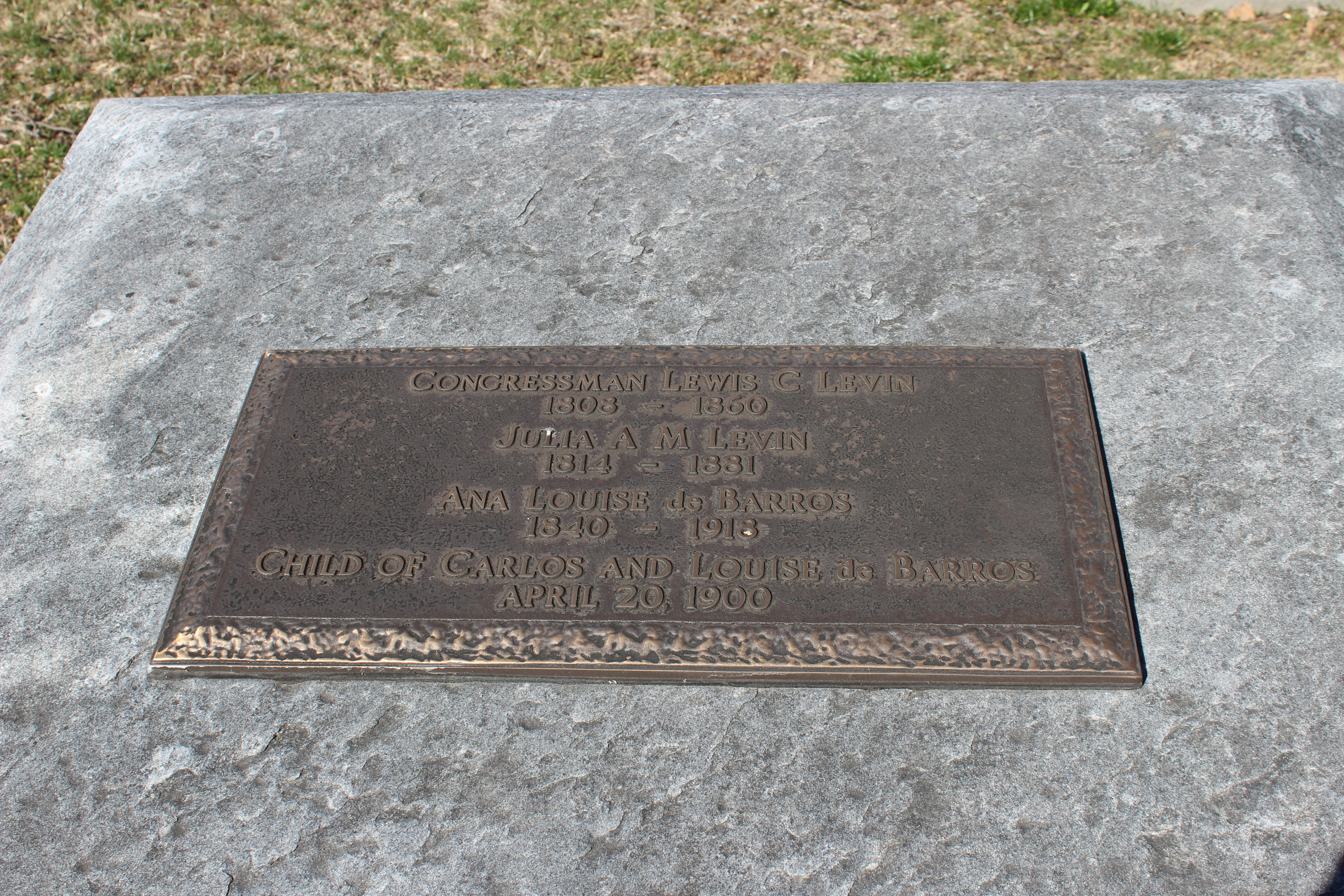
Lewis C. Levin tombstone in Laurel Hill Cemetery

Newspapers report him being committed on a later occasion in June 1859, after a visit to a brother in Columbia, South Carolina. Levin is said to have become "dangerous and unmanageable" on the train to Richmond, whereupon friends and railway workers subdued him and detained him in the mail car. The nature of his madness is unclear, but one newspaper, expanding on a wire-service story, speculated, "His insanity is supposed to have been brought about by an immoderate use of opium." He was returned to the Philadelphia Hospital for the Insane and died there of "Insanity" in March 1860. Levin was buried in Laurel Hill Cemetery in Philadelphia.

== Legacy ==
Levin's role in a nativist party is a paradox, despite the fact he was native-born himself (albeit first-generation). His opposition was not to immigration as such but rather to Catholicism; he eagerly sought support from non-Catholic immigrants. It is a mark of his skill that he was able to equate "nativism" with anti-Catholicism, and to do so in Philadelphia, where sectarian animosity had historically been minimal, and where native-born Catholics had lived side-by-side with Anglicans, Quakers, and others since the Colonial period.

Levin himself did not seem to have any personal sectarian animus, which suggests that his anti-Catholic activism was merely rhetorical and opportunistic. The explorer and soldier John Gregory Bourke (1846–1896), whose devoutly Catholic family were friends and neighbors of Levin's in 1840s and 1850s Philadelphia, recalled Levin fondly and wrote that the Bourke and Levin families were close for many years.

Similarly, Charles Nordhoff worked for Lewis Levin when he was a boy, around 1845, and recalled Levin as a kind, generous employer. A "printer's devil" for Levin's Daily Sun newspaper, Nordhoff really wanted to be a cabin boy on a US Navy ship going to China. Levin first warned the lad that he'd end up as a "dirty, drunken old sailor," but relented at last, and intervened with Philadelphia Navy Yard commander, Commodore Jesse Elliot to get the boy a billet. Nordhoff's maritime and writing career was thereby launched.

Levin was one of the most popular public speakers of his era, often quoted and anthologized. In 1905 a veteran Pennsylvania journalist and politician, Alexander Kelly McClure, recalled Levin as one of the shrewdest and most persuasive politicians of the period.

A brilliant adventurer named Lewis C. Levin, a native of Charleston, S.C., and a peripatetic law practitioner, first in South Carolina, next in Maryland, next in Louisiana, next in Kentucky and finally in Pennsylvania, was the acknowledged leader of the Native American element that had erupted during the summer of 1844 in what is remembered as the disgraceful riots of that year in which Catholic churches and institutions were burnt by the mob ... He was one of the most brilliant and unscrupulous orators I have ever heard. He presented a fine appearance, graceful in every action charming in rhetoric and utterly reckless in assertion. I have heard him both as a temperance and political orator, and I doubt whether during his day any person in either party of the State surpassed him on the hustings. He was elected by a good majority and was re-elected in 1846 and '48, thus serving six consecutive years as a representative from the city.

— Old Time Notes of Pennsylvania, 1905, pp. 84–85.

In a book about the fraught history of religious freedom in the United States, the writer Steven Waldman recalled Levin and his role in the nativist anti-Catholic agitation in the 1840s and 1850s. Referring to Levin's ostensible status as the first Jew elected to Congress, Waldman cited him for "proving that being part of a persecuted group does not necessarily bring sensitivity to the plight of other religious minorities."

== Published works ==
- Intemperance the Prelude to Gambling and Suicide, as Illustrated in the Life of the Rev. C.C. Colton, Author of "Lacon", William F. Geddes, Philadelphia, 1844
- Speech of Mr. L.C. Levin, of Pennsylvania, on the Subject of Altering the Naturalization Laws, J. & G.S. Gideon, 1845
- Speech of Mr. Levin of Philadelphia, PA. on an Amendment to the Naval Appropriation Bill, Directing the Construction of a Sectional Floating Dry-Dock, Basin, and Railways at the Philadelphia Navy-Yard, Union Office, Washington, 1846
- Speech of Mr. L.C. Levin, of Penn., on the Proposed Mission to Rome, J. & G.S. Gideon, 1848

== See also ==
- List of Jewish members of the United States Congress

U.S. House of Representatives
| Preceded by Edward J. Morris | Member of the U.S. House of Representatives from Pennsylvania's 1st congressional district 1845–1851 | Succeeded by Thomas B. Florence |
