= Rockledge, Pennsylvania =

Borough in Pennsylvania, US

Borough of Rockledge
- Borough
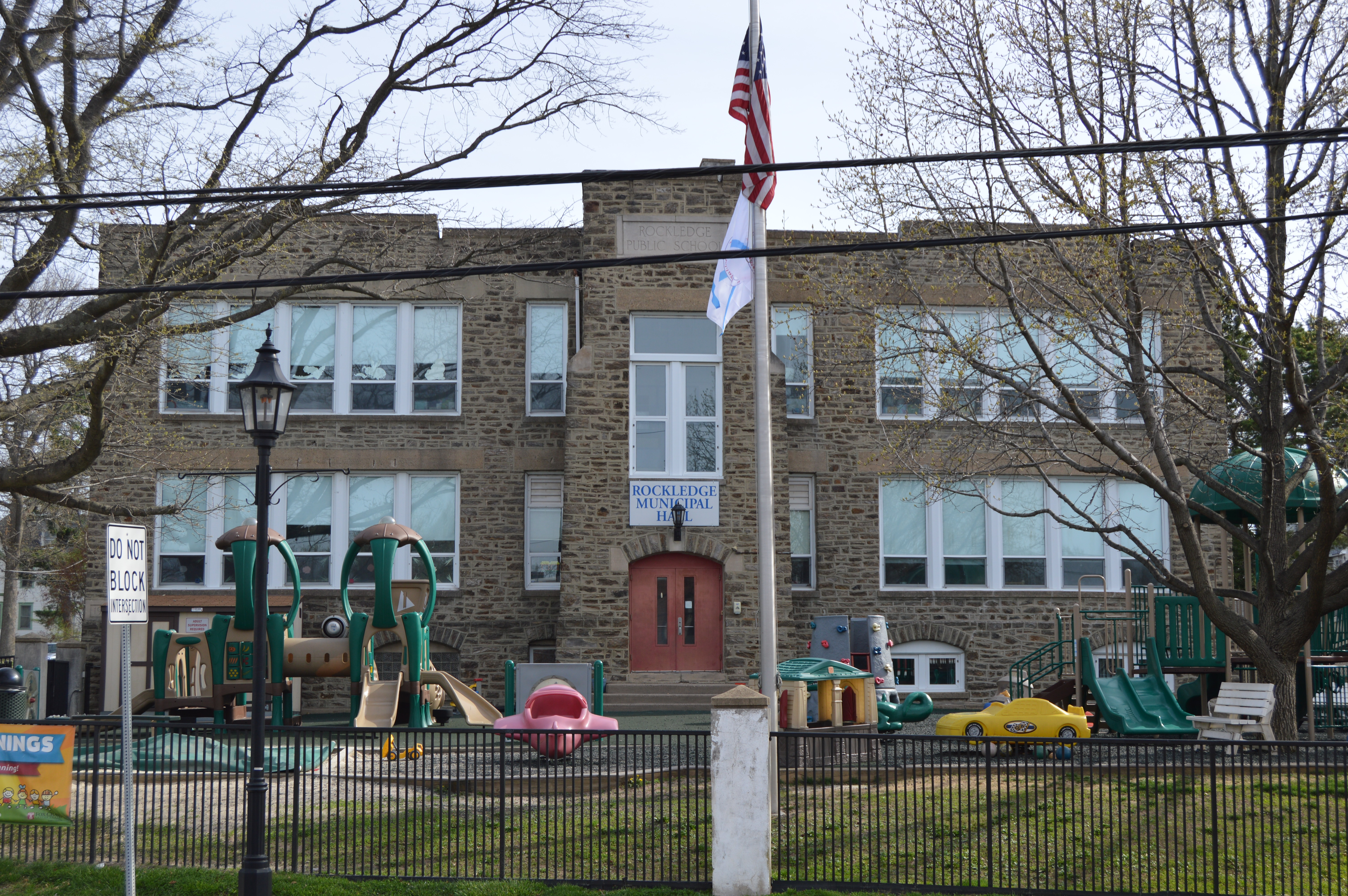
- Municipal building on Huntingdon Pike

- Flag Seal

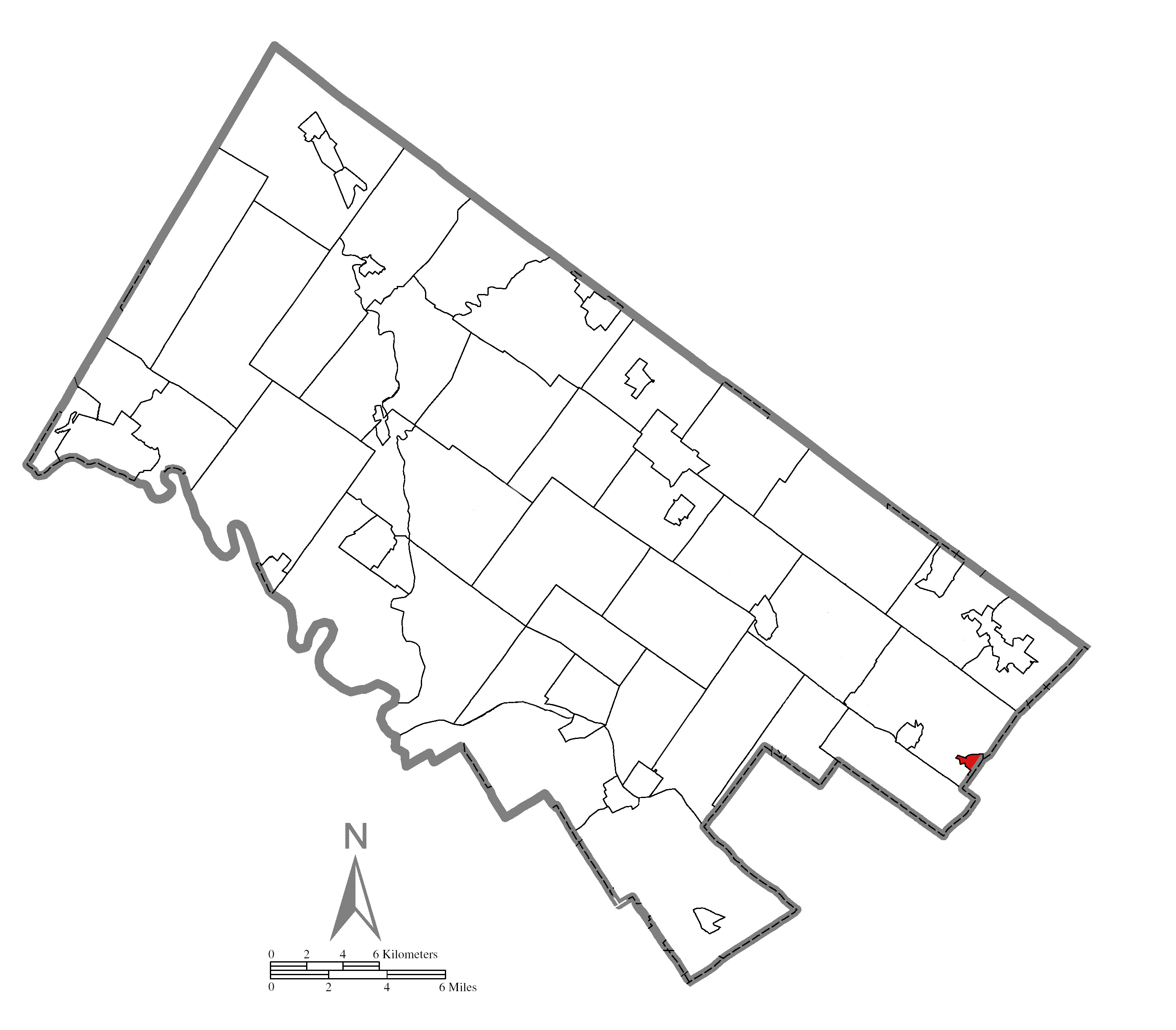
- Location of Rockledge in Montgomery County, Pennsylvania.

- Location of Rockledge in Pennsylvania Rockledge (the United States)
- Coordinates: 40.0816°N 75.0904°W
- Country: United States
- State: Pennsylvania
- County: Montgomery

Government
  - Type: Council-manager
  - Mayor: Harold Praediger

Area
  - Total: 0.34 sq mi (0.88 km^{2})
  - Land: 0.34 sq mi (0.88 km^{2})
  - Water: 0 sq mi (0.00 km^{2})
- Elevation: 223 ft (68 m)

Population (2020)
  - Total: 2,638
  - Density: 7,743.9/sq mi (2,989.93/km^{2})
- Time zone: UTC-5 (EST)
  - Summer (DST): UTC-4 (EDT)
- ZIP code: 19046
- Area codes: 215, 267 and 445
- FIPS code: 42-65568
- Website: http://www.rockledgeborough.org

Rockledge is a borough in Montgomery County, Pennsylvania, United States. The population was 2,638 as of the 2020 census. Rockledge is surrounded by Abington Township and the city of Philadelphia, and shares a ZIP code with Jenkintown.

== Geography ==
According to the United States Census Bureau, the borough has a total area of 0.3 square miles (0.78 km^{2}), all land.

== Transportation ==
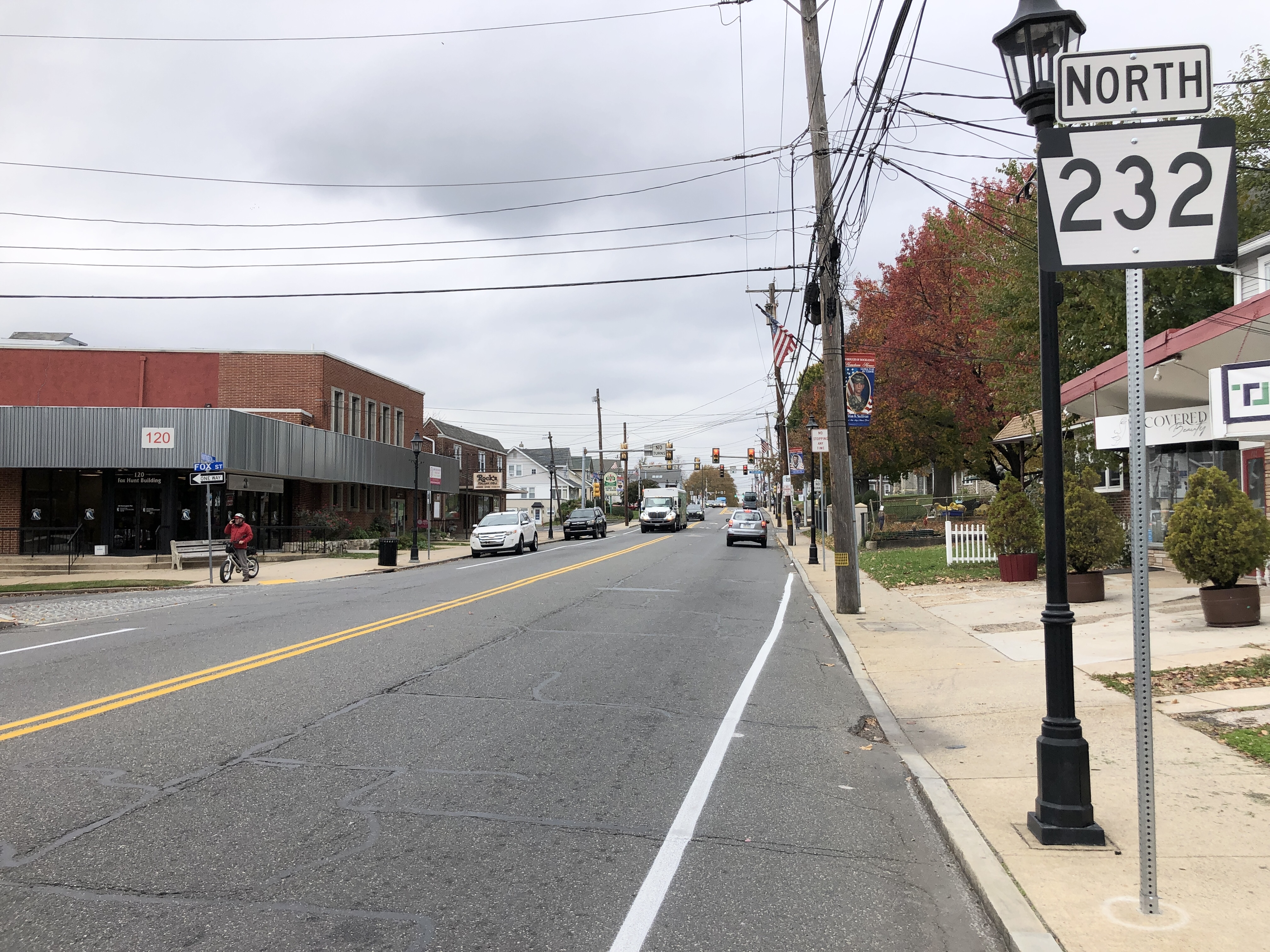
PA 232 northbound in Rockledge

As of 2007 there were 7.31 miles (11.76 km) of public roads in Rockledge, of which 0.85 miles (1.37 km) were maintained by the Pennsylvania Department of Transportation (PennDOT) and 6.46 miles (10.40 km) were maintained by the borough.

Pennsylvania Route 232 is the only numbered highway serving the town. It traverses the borough on a northwest-southeast alignment along Huntingdon Pike.

SEPTA provides City Bus service to Rockledge along Route 24, which runs between the Frankford Transportation Center in Northeast Philadelphia and Southampton, and Route 28, which runs between the Fern Rock Transportation Center in North Philadelphia and the Torresdale and Cottman Avenues Loop in Northeast Philadelphia. The Fox Chase station which serves as the terminus of SEPTA Regional Rail's Fox Chase Line is located near Rockledge in the Fox Chase neighborhood of Philadelphia.

== Demographics ==
Historical population
Census	Pop.	Note	%±
1900	512		—
1910	879		71.7%
1920	1,029		17.1%
1930	1,920		86.6%
1940	1,773		−7.7%
1950	2,261		27.5%
1960	2,587		14.4%
1970	2,564		−0.9%
1980	2,538		−1.0%
1990	2,679		5.6%
2000	2,577		−3.8%
2010	2,543		−1.3%
2020	2,638		3.7%

As of the 2010 census, the borough was 95.8% White, 0.4% Black or African American, 1.2% Asian, and 2.0% were two or more races. 2.0% of the population were of Hispanic or Latino ancestry .

As of the census of 2000, there were 2,577 people, 1,060 households, and 645 families residing in the borough. The population density was 7,428.9 inhabitants per square mile (2,868.3/km^{2}). There were 1,091 housing units at an average density of 3,145.1 per square mile (1,214.3/km^{2}). The racial makeup of the borough was 97.98% White, 0.04% African American, 0.04% Native American, 0.97% Asian, 0.31% from other races, and 0.66% from two or more races. Hispanic and Latino Americans of any race were 0.58% of the population.

There were 1,060 households, out of which 28.5% had children under the age of 18 living with them, 50.3% were married couples living together, 7.7% had a female householder with no husband present, and 39.1% were non-families. 34.6% of all households were made up of individuals, and 12.5% had someone living alone who was 65 years of age or older. The average household size was 2.43 and the average family size was 3.24.

In the borough the population was spread out, with 23.6% under the age of 18, 7.6% from 18 to 24, 32.3% from 25 to 44, 21.0% from 45 to 64, and 15.5% who were 65 years of age or older. The median age was 38 years. For every 100 females there were 91.9 males. For every 100 females age 18 and over, there were 90.9 males.

The median income for a household in the borough was $47,958, and the median income for a family was $55,455. Males had a median income of $40,349 versus $32,100 for females. The per capita income for the borough was $21,232. About 1.8% of families and 3.0% of the population were below the Poverty threshold, including 0.7% of those under age 18 and 8.8% of those age 65 or over.

== Politics and government ==
Rockledge has a borough manager form of government with a mayor and a seven-member borough council.

- Mayor: Brian Corrigan
- Vincent Menniti Jr. - President of Council

The borough is part of the Pennsylvania's 4th congressional district (represented by Congressman Madeleine Dean), the 172nd State House District (represented by Rep. Kevin J. Boyle) and the 4th State Senate District (represented by Sen. Art Haywood).

Presidential elections results
Year	Republican	Democratic
2020	49.4% 778	49.6% 780
2016	46.0% 646	48.8% 686
2012	48.0% 661	50.6% 696
2008	48.5% 706	50.5% 735
2004	47.3% 658	52.3% 728
2000	49.1% 601	47.0% 575

== Notable people ==
- Dick McBride, an MLB player from 1871-1876. He accumulated 29.6 WAR in only 237 career games as a starting pitcher for the Philadelphia Athletics. He is buried in Rockledge at Lawnview Memorial Park.
- Hampton S. Thomas, a Medal of Honor recipient in the American Civil War, was buried in Rockledge.

== Attractions ==
The Rockledge Model Railroad Museum, located on the corner of Montgomery & Sylvania Avenues, is home to the GATSME Lines Model RR Club and is housed in a historic textile mill building. The club was formerly located in Fort Washington, until 2014, when it relocated to its current location.

Preceded by Abington Township	Bordering communities of Philadelphia	Succeeded by Abington Township
