= List of United States representatives in the 35th Congress =

This is a complete list of United States representatives during the 35th United States Congress listed by seniority.

As a historical article, the districts and party affiliations listed reflect those during the 35th Congress (March 4, 1857 – March 3, 1859). Seats and party affiliations on similar lists for other congresses will be different for certain members.

Seniority depends on the date on which members were sworn into office. Since many members are sworn in on the same day, subsequent ranking is based on the previous congressional service of the individual and then by alphabetical order by the last name of the representative.

Committee chairmanship in the House is often associated with seniority. However, party leadership is typically not associated with seniority.

Note: The "*" indicates that the representative/delegate may have served one or more non-consecutive terms while in the House of Representatives of the United States Congress.

== U.S. House seniority list ==
U.S. House seniority
Rank	Representative	Party	District	Seniority date (Previous service, if any)	No.# of term(s)	Notes
1	Joshua R. Giddings	R	OH-20	December 5, 1842; Previous service, 1838–1842.	12th term*	Dean of the House; Left the House in 1859.
2	George W. Jones	D	TN-06	March 4, 1843	8th term	Left the House in 1859.
3	Alexander H. Stephens	D	GA-08	October 2, 1843	8th term	Left the House in 1859.
4	John S. Phelps	D	MO-06	March 4, 1845	7th term	
5	Thomas L. Clingman	D	NC-08	March 4, 1847; Previous service, 1843–1845.	7th term*	Resigned on May 7, 1858.
6	Thomas S. Bocock	D	VA-05	March 4, 1847	6th term	
7	Williamson R. W. Cobb	D	AL-06	March 4, 1847	6th term	
8	John McQueen	D	SC-01	February 12, 1849	6th term	
9	Henry Bennett	R	NY-21	March 4, 1849	5th term	Left the House in 1859.
10	Lewis D. Campbell	R	OH-03	March 4, 1849	5th term	Resigned on May 25, 1858.
11	Henry A. Edmundson	D	VA-12	March 4, 1849	5th term	
12	John Millson	D	VA-02	March 4, 1849	5th term	
13	James L. Orr	D	SC-05	March 4, 1849	5th term	Speaker of the House; Left the House in 1859.
14	Paulus Powell	D	VA-06	March 4, 1849	5th term	Left the House in 1859.
15	John Caskie	D	VA-03	March 4, 1851	4th term	Left the House in 1859.
16	Charles J. Faulkner	D	VA-08	March 4, 1851	4th term	Left the House in 1859.
17	Thomas B. Florence	D	PA-01	March 4, 1851	4th term	
18	Galusha A. Grow	D	PA-14	March 4, 1851	4th term	
19	George S. Houston	D	AL-05	March 4, 1851; Previous service, 1841–1849.	8th term*	
20	John Letcher	D	VA-09	March 4, 1851	4th term	Left the House in 1859.
21	Israel Washburn Jr.	R	ME-05	March 4, 1851	4th term	
22	Nathaniel P. Banks	R	MA-07	March 4, 1853	3rd term	Resigned on December 24, 1857.
23	William Barksdale	D	MS-03	March 4, 1853	3rd term	
24	William W. Boyce	D	SC-06	March 4, 1853	3rd term	
25	Samuel Caruthers	D	MO-07	March 4, 1853	3rd term	Left the House in 1859.
26	Francis B. Craige	D	NC-07	March 4, 1853	3rd term	
27	John Dick	R	PA-25	March 4, 1853	3rd term	Left the House in 1859.
28	James F. Dowdell	D	AL-03	March 4, 1853	3rd term	Left the House in 1859.
29	John M. Elliott	D	KY-06	March 4, 1853	3rd term	Left the House in 1859.
30	William H. English	D	IN-02	March 4, 1853	3rd term	
31	William Goode	D	VA-04	March 4, 1853; Previous service, 1841–1843.	4th term*	
32	Alfred B. Greenwood	D	AR-01	March 4, 1853	3rd term	Left the House in 1859.
33	Aaron Harlan	R	OH-07	March 4, 1853	3rd term	Left the House in 1859.
34	Edwin B. Morgan	R	NY-25	March 4, 1853	3rd term	Left the House in 1859.
35	Matthias H. Nichols	R	OH-04	March 4, 1853	3rd term	Left the House in 1859.
36	Charles Ready	W	TN-05	March 4, 1853	3rd term	Left the House in 1859.
37	David Ritchie	R	PA-21	March 4, 1853	3rd term	Left the House in 1859.
38	Thomas H. Ruffin	D	NC-02	March 4, 1853	3rd term	
39	James L. Seward	D	GA-01	March 4, 1853	3rd term	Left the House in 1859.
40	Samuel A. Smith	D	TN-03	March 4, 1853	3rd term	Left the House in 1859.
41	William Smith	D	VA-07	March 4, 1853; Previous service, 1841–1843.	4th term*	
42	Edward Wade	R	OH-19	March 4, 1853	3rd term	
43	Elihu B. Washburne	R	IL-01	March 4, 1853	3rd term	
44	Felix Zollicoffer	D	TN-08	March 4, 1853	3rd term	Left the House in 1859.
45	Jehu G. Jones	D	PA-08	February 4, 1854; Previous service, 1851–1853.	4th term*	Resigned on October 30, 1858.
46	Philemon Bliss	R	OH-14	March 4, 1855	2nd term	Left the House in 1859.
47	Charles Billinghurst	R	WI-03	March 4, 1855	2nd term	Left the House in 1859.
48	John Bingham	R	OH-21	March 4, 1855	2nd term	
49	Thomas F. Bowie	D	MD-06	March 4, 1855	2nd term	Left the House in 1859.
50	Lawrence O'Bryan Branch	D	NC-04	March 4, 1855	2nd term	
51	Samuel Brenton	R	IN-10	March 4, 1855; Previous service, 1851–1853.	3rd term*	Died on March 29, 1857.
52	James Buffington	R	MA-02	March 4, 1855	2nd term	
53	Anson Burlingame	KN	MA-05	March 4, 1855	2nd term	
54	Henry C. Burnett	D	KY-01	March 4, 1855	2nd term	
55	Calvin C. Chaffee	R	MA-10	March 4, 1855	2nd term	Left the House in 1859.
56	Ezra Clark Jr.	KN	CT-01	March 4, 1855	2nd term	Left the House in 1859.
57	Isaiah D. Clawson	R	NJ-01	March 4, 1855	2nd term	Left the House in 1859.
58	Schuyler Colfax	R	IN-09	March 4, 1855	2nd term	
59	Linus B. Comins	R	MA-04	March 4, 1855	2nd term	Left the House in 1859.
60	John Covode	R	PA-19	March 4, 1855	2nd term	
61	Aaron H. Cragin	R	NH-03	March 4, 1855	2nd term	Left the House in 1859.
62	Martin J. Crawford	D	GA-02	March 4, 1855	2nd term	
63	William S. Damrell	R	MA-03	March 4, 1855	2nd term	Left the House in 1859.
64	Thomas G. Davidson	D	LA-03	March 4, 1855	2nd term	
65	Timothy Davis	KN	MA-06	March 4, 1855	2nd term	Left the House in 1859.
66	Henry W. Davis	D	MD-04	March 4, 1855	2nd term	
67	Sidney Dean	R	CT-03	March 4, 1855	2nd term	Left the House in 1859.
68	Edward Dodd	R	NY-15	March 4, 1855	2nd term	Left the House in 1859.
69	Nathan B. Durfee	KN	RI-01	March 4, 1855	2nd term	Left the House in 1859.
70	John Rufus Edie	R	PA-18	March 4, 1855	2nd term	Left the House in 1859.
71	George Eustis Jr.	KN	LA-01	March 4, 1855	2nd term	Left the House in 1859.
72	Amos P. Granger	R	NY-24	March 4, 1855	2nd term	Left the House in 1859.
73	Robert B. Hall	R	MA-01	March 4, 1855	2nd term	Left the House in 1859.
74	John Hickman	D	PA-06	March 4, 1855	2nd term	
75	James M. Harris	D	MD-03	March 4, 1855	2nd term	
76	Thomas L. Harris	D	IL-06	March 4, 1855; Previous service, 1849–1851.	3rd term*	Died on November 24, 1858.
77	Valentine B. Horton	R	OH-11	March 4, 1855	2nd term	Left the House in 1859.
78	William A. Howard	R	MI-01	March 4, 1855	2nd term	Left the House in 1859.
79	Joshua Jewett	D	KY-05	March 4, 1855	2nd term	Left the House in 1859.
80	John Kelly	D	NY-04	March 4, 1855	2nd term	Resigned on December 25, 1858.
81	William H. Kelsey	R	NY-28	March 4, 1855	2nd term	Left the House in 1859.
82	Chauncey L. Knapp	R	MA-08	March 4, 1855	2nd term	Left the House in 1859.
83	John C. Kunkel	R	PA-10	March 4, 1855	2nd term	Left the House in 1859.
84	Benjamin F. Leiter	R	OH-18	March 4, 1855	2nd term	Left the House in 1859.
85	Humphrey Marshall	KN	KY-07	March 4, 1855; Previous service, 1849–1852.	4th term*	Left the House in 1859.
86	Samuel S. Marshall	D	IL-09	March 4, 1855	2nd term	Left the House in 1859.
87	Justin S. Morrill	R	VT-02	March 4, 1855	2nd term	
88	Richard Mott	D	OH-05	March 4, 1855	2nd term	Left the House in 1859.
89	Ambrose S. Murray	R	NY-10	March 4, 1855	2nd term	Left the House in 1859.
90	John M. Parker	R	NY-27	March 4, 1855	2nd term	Left the House in 1859.
91	John U. Pettit	R	IN-11	March 4, 1855	2nd term	
92	James Pike	KN	NH-01	March 4, 1855	2nd term	Left the House in 1859.
93	Samuel Anderson Purviance	R	PA-22	March 4, 1855	2nd term	Left the House in 1859.
94	John A. Quitman	D	MS-05	March 4, 1855	2nd term	Died on July 17, 1858.
95	James B. Ricaud	KN	MD-02	March 4, 1855	2nd term	Left the House in 1859.
96	George R. Robbins	R	NJ-02	March 4, 1855	2nd term	Left the House in 1859.
97	Anthony E. Roberts	D	PA-09	March 4, 1855	2nd term	Left the House in 1859.
98	John M. Sandidge	D	LA-04	March 4, 1855	2nd term	Left the House in 1859.
99	John H. Savage	D	TN-04	March 4, 1855; Previous service, 1849–1853.	4th term*	Left the House in 1859.
100	John Sherman	R	OH-13	March 4, 1855	2nd term	
101	Eli S. Shorter	D	AL-02	March 4, 1855	2nd term	Left the House in 1859.
102	Francis E. Spinner	R	NY-17	March 4, 1855	2nd term	
103	Benjamin Stanton	R	OH-08	March 4, 1855; Previous service, 1851–1853.	3rd term*	
104	James A. Stewart	D	MD-01	March 4, 1855	2nd term	
105	Albert G. Talbott	D	KY-04	March 4, 1855	2nd term	Left the House in 1859.
106	Mason Tappan	R	NH-02	March 4, 1855	2nd term	
107	Miles Taylor	D	LA-02	March 4, 1855	2nd term	
108	Robert P. Trippe	KN	GA-03	March 4, 1855	2nd term	Left the House in 1859.
109	Warner Underwood	KN	KY-03	March 4, 1855	2nd term	Left the House in 1859.
110	David S. Walbridge	R	MI-03	March 4, 1855	2nd term	Left the House in 1859.
111	Henry Waldron	R	MI-02	March 4, 1855	2nd term	
112	Cadwallader C. Washburn	R	WI-02	March 4, 1855	2nd term	
113	Albert G. Watkins	D	TN-01	March 4, 1855; Previous service, 1849–1853.	4th term*	Left the House in 1859.
114	Warren Winslow	D	NC-03	March 4, 1855	2nd term	
115	John M. Wood	R	ME-01	March 4, 1855	2nd term	Left the House in 1859.
116	John V. Wright	D	TN-07	March 4, 1855	2nd term	
117	Laurence M. Keitt	D	SC-03	August 6, 1856; Previous service, 1853–1856.	3rd term*	
118	Muscoe R.H. Garnett	D	VA-01	December 1, 1856	2nd term	
119	Nehemiah Abbott	R	ME-03	March 4, 1857	1st term	Left the House in 1859.
120	Garnett Adrain	D	NJ-03	March 4, 1857	1st term	
121	John Alexander Ahl	D	PA-16	March 4, 1857	1st term	Left the House in 1859.
122	Thomas L. Anderson	D	MO-02	March 4, 1857	1st term	
123	Samuel G. Andrews	R	NY-29	March 4, 1857	1st term	Left the House in 1859.
124	Samuel Arnold	D	CT-02	March 4, 1857	1st term	Left the House in 1859.
125	William T. Avery	D	TN-10	March 4, 1857	1st term	
126	John DeWitt Clinton Atkins	D	TN-09	March 4, 1857	1st term	Left the House in 1859.
127	William D. Bishop	D	CT-04	March 4, 1857	1st term	Left the House in 1859.
128	Francis P. Blair Jr.	D	MO-01	March 4, 1857	1st term	Left the House in 1859.
129	Milledge L. Bonham	D	SC-04	March 4, 1857	1st term	
130	Guy M. Bryan	D	TX-02	March 4, 1857	1st term	Left the House in 1859.
131	William D. Brayton	R	RI-02	March 4, 1857	1st term	
132	Joseph Burns	D	OH-15	March 4, 1857	1st term	Left the House in 1859.
133	Silas M. Burroughs	R	NY-31	March 4, 1857	1st term	
134	Henry Chapman	D	PA-07	March 4, 1857	1st term	Left the House in 1859.
135	Horace F. Clark	D	NY-08	March 4, 1857	1st term	
136	James B. Clay	D	KY-08	March 4, 1857	1st term	Left the House in 1859.
137	Sherrard Clemens	D	VA-10	March 4, 1857; Previous service, 1852–1853.	2nd term*	
138	Clark B. Cochrane	R	NY-18	March 4, 1857	1st term	
139	John Cochrane	D	NY-06	March 4, 1857	1st term	
140	Joseph R. Cockerill	D	OH-06	March 4, 1857	1st term	Left the House in 1859.
141	Erastus Corning	D	NY-14	March 4, 1857	1st term	Left the House in 1859.
142	Samuel S. Cox	D	OH-12	March 4, 1857	1st term	
143	James Craig	D	MO-04	March 4, 1857	1st term	
144	Jabez Lamar Monroe Curry	D	AL-07	March 4, 1857	1st term	
145	Samuel R. Curtis	R	IA-01	March 4, 1857	1st term	
146	John G. Davis	D	IN-07	March 4, 1857; Previous service, 1851–1855.	3rd term*	
147	Reuben Davis	D	MS-02	March 4, 1857	1st term	
148	Timothy Davis	R	IA-02	March 4, 1857	1st term	Left the House in 1859.
149	Henry L. Dawes	R	MA-11	March 4, 1857	1st term	
150	William L. Dewart	D	PA-11	March 4, 1857	1st term	
151	William H. Dimmick	D	PA-13	March 4, 1857	1st term	
152	John F. Farnsworth	R	IL-02	March 4, 1857	1st term	
153	Reuben Fenton	R	NY-33	March 4, 1857; Previous service, 1853–1855.	2nd term*	
154	James B. Foley	D	IN-04	March 4, 1857	1st term	Left the House in 1859.
155	Stephen C. Foster	R	ME-06	March 4, 1857	1st term	
156	Lucius J. Gartrell	R	GA-04	March 4, 1857	1st term	
157	James L. Gillis	D	PA-24	March 4, 1857	1st term	Left the House in 1859.
158	Charles J. Gilman	R	ME-02	March 4, 1857	1st term	Left the House in 1859.
159	John A. Gilmer	R	NC-05	March 4, 1857	1st term	
160	William S. Groesbeck	D	OH-02	March 4, 1857	1st term	Left the House in 1859.
161	Henry C. Goodwin	R	NY-22	March 4, 1857; Previous service, 1854–1855.	2nd term*	Left the House in 1859.
162	James M. Gregg	D	IN-06	March 4, 1857	1st term	Left the House in 1859.
163	Lawrence W. Hall	D	OH-09	March 4, 1857	1st term	Left the House in 1859.
164	John B. Haskin	D	NY-09	March 4, 1857	1st term	
165	Israel T. Hatch	D	NY-32	March 4, 1857	1st term	Left the House in 1859.
166	George S. Hawkins	D	FL	March 4, 1857	1st term	
167	Joshua Hill	R	GA-07	March 4, 1857	1st term	
168	Charles B. Hoard	R	NY-23	March 4, 1857	1st term	
169	George W. Hopkins	D	VA-13	March 4, 1857; Previous service, 1835–1847.	7th term*	Left the House in 1859.
170	James Hughes	D	IN-03	March 4, 1857	1st term	Left the House in 1859.
171	John Huyler	D	NJ-04	March 4, 1857	1st term	Left the House in 1859.
172	James Jackson	D	GA-06	March 4, 1857	1st term	
173	Albert G. Jenkins	D	VA-11	March 4, 1857	1st term	
174	Owen Jones	D	PA-05	March 4, 1857	1st term	Left the House in 1859.
175	William Kellogg	R	IL-04	March 4, 1857	1st term	
176	David Kilgore	R	IN-05	March 4, 1857	1st term	
177	Jacob M. Kunkel	D	MD-05	March 4, 1857	1st term	
178	Lucius Q. C. Lamar II	D	MS-01	March 4, 1857	1st term	
179	James Landy	D	PA-03	March 4, 1857	1st term	Left the House in 1859.
180	William Lawrence	D	OH-17	March 4, 1857	1st term	Left the House in 1859.
181	Dewitt C. Leach	R	MI-04	March 4, 1857	1st term	
182	James Lockhart	D	IN-01	March 4, 1857; Previous service, 1851–1853.	2nd term*	Died on September 7, 1857.
183	Owen Lovejoy	R	IL-03	March 4, 1857	1st term	
184	William B. Maclay	D	NY-05	March 4, 1857; Previous service, 1843–1849.	4th term*	
185	Orsamus B. Matteson	R	NY-20	March 4, 1857; Previous service, 1849–1851 and 1853–1857.	4th term**	Left the House in 1859.
186	John C. Mason	D	KY-09	March 4, 1857; Previous service, 1849–1853.	3rd term*	Left the House in 1859.
187	Horace Maynard	D	TN-02	March 4, 1857	1st term	
188	Joseph C. McKibbin	D	CA	March 4, 1857	1st term	Left the House in 1859.
189	William P. Miles	D	SC-02	March 4, 1857	1st term	
190	Joseph Miller	D	OH-10	March 4, 1857	1st term	Left the House in 1859.
191	John G. Montgomery	D	PA-12	March 4, 1857	1st term	Died on April 24, 1857.
192	William Montgomery	D	PA-20	March 4, 1857	1st term	
193	Sydenham Moore	D	AL-04	March 4, 1857	1st term	
194	Edward J. Morris	R	PA-02	March 4, 1857; Previous service, 1843–1845.	2nd term*	
195	Isaac N. Morris	D	IL-05	March 4, 1857	1st term	
196	Freeman H. Morse	R	ME-04	March 4, 1857; Previous service, 1843–1845.	2nd term*	
197	Oliver A. Morse	R	NY-19	March 4, 1857	1st term	Left the House in 1859.
198	Abram B. Olin	R	NY-13	March 4, 1857	1st term	
199	George W. Palmer	R	NY-16	March 4, 1857	1st term	
200	George H. Pendleton	D	OH-01	March 4, 1857	1st term	
201	Samuel Peyton	D	KY-02	March 4, 1857; Previous service, 1847–1849.	2nd term*	
202	Henry M. Phillips	D	PA-04	March 4, 1857	1st term	Left the House in 1859.
203	John F. Potter	R	WI-01	March 4, 1857	1st term	
204	Emory B. Pottle	R	NY-26	March 4, 1857	1st term	
205	John Henninger Reagan	D	TX-01	March 4, 1857	1st term	
206	Wilson Reilly	D	PA-17	March 4, 1857	1st term	Left the House in 1859.
207	Homer E. Royce	R	VT-03	March 4, 1857	1st term	
208	William F. Russell	D	NY-11	March 4, 1857	1st term	Left the House in 1859.
209	Alfred M. Scales	D	NC-06	March 4, 1857	1st term	Left the House in 1859.
210	Charles L. Scott	D	CA	March 4, 1857	1st term	
211	John A. Searing	D	NY-01	March 4, 1857	1st term	Left the House in 1859.
212	Aaron Shaw	D	IL-07	March 4, 1857	1st term	Left the House in 1859.
213	Henry M. Shaw	D	NC-01	March 4, 1857; Previous service, 1853–1855.	2nd term*	Left the House in 1859.
214	Daniel Sickles	D	NY-03	March 4, 1857	1st term	
215	Otho R. Singleton	D	MS-04	March 4, 1857; Previous service, 1853–1855.	2nd term*	
216	Judson W. Sherman	R	NY-30	March 4, 1857	1st term	Left the House in 1859.
217	Robert Smith	D	IL-08	March 4, 1857; Previous service, 1843–1849.	4th term*	Left the House in 1859.
218	James A. Stallworth	D	AL-01	March 4, 1857	1st term	
219	William Stewart	R	PA-23	March 4, 1857	1st term	
220	John W. Stevenson	D	KY-10	March 4, 1857	1st term	
221	George Taylor	D	NY-02	March 4, 1857	1st term	Left the House in 1859.
222	Eli Thayer	R	MA-09	March 4, 1857	1st term	
223	John Thompson	R	NY-12	March 4, 1857	1st term	Left the House in 1859.
224	Cydnor B. Tompkins	R	OH-16	March 4, 1857	1st term	
225	Eliakim P. Walton	R	VT-01	March 4, 1857	1st term	
226	Elijah Ward	D	NY-07	March 4, 1857	1st term	Left the House in 1859.
227	Edward A. Warren	D	AR-02	March 4, 1857; Previous service, 1853–1855.	2nd term*	Left the House in 1859.
228	James Wilson	R	IN-08	March 4, 1857	1st term	
229	Allison White	D	PA-15	March 4, 1857	1st term	Left the House in 1859.
230	William G. Whiteley	D	DE	March 4, 1857	1st term	
231	Augustus R. Wright	D	GA-05	March 4, 1857	1st term	Left the House in 1859.
232	Samuel H. Woodson	KN	MO-05	March 4, 1857	1st term	
233	Jacob R. Wortendyke	D	NJ-05	March 4, 1857	1st term	Left the House in 1859.
	Charles Case	R	IN-10	December 7, 1857	1st term	
	John B. Clark	D	MO-03	December 7, 1857	1st term	
	Paul Leidy	D	PA-12	December 7, 1857	1st term	Left the House in 1859.
	William E. Niblack	D	IN-01	December 7, 1857	1st term	
	Daniel W. Gooch	R	MA-07	January 31, 1858	1st term	
	James M. Cavanaugh	D	MN-01	May 11, 1858	1st term	Left the House in 1859.
	William W. Phelps	D	MN-02	May 11, 1858	1st term	Left the House in 1859.
	Clement Vallandigham	D	OH-03	May 25, 1858	1st term	
	William H. Keim	R	PA-08	December 7, 1858	1st term	Left the House in 1859.
	John J. McRae	D	MS-05	December 7, 1858	1st term	
	Zebulon B. Vance	D	NC-08	December 7, 1858	1st term	
	Charles D. Hodges	D	IL-06	January 4, 1859	1st term	Left the House in 1859.
	Thomas J. Barr	D	NY-04	January 17, 1859	1st term	
	La Fayette Grover	D	OR	February 14, 1859	1st term	Left the House in 1859.

== Delegates ==
Rank	Delegate	Party	District	Seniority date (Previous service, if any)	No.# of term(s)	Notes
1	John Milton Bernhisel	D	UT	March 4, 1851	4th term	
2	Joseph Lane	D	OR	March 4, 1851	4th term	
3	Miguel Antonio Otero	D	NM	July 23, 1856	2nd term	
4	Fenner Ferguson	D	NE	March 4, 1857	1st term	
5	William W. Kingsbury	D	MN	March 4, 1857	1st term	
6	Marcus Junius Parrott	R	KS	March 4, 1857	1st term	
7	Isaac Stevens	D	WA	March 4, 1857	1st term	

== See also ==
- 35th United States Congress
- List of United States congressional districts
- List of United States senators in the 35th Congress
