= List of United States senators in the 35th Congress =

This is a complete list of United States senators during the 35th United States Congress listed by seniority from March 4, 1857, to March 3, 1859.

Order of service is based on the commencement of the senator's first term. Behind this is former service as a senator (only giving the senator seniority within their new incoming class), service as vice president, a House member, a cabinet secretary, or a governor of a state. The final factor is the population of the senator's state.

Senators who were sworn in during the middle of the Congress (up until the last senator who was not sworn in early after winning the November 1858 election) are listed at the end of the list with no number.

== Terms of service ==
Class	Terms of service of senators that expired in years
Class 2	Terms of service of senators that expired in 1859 (AL, AR, CO, DE, GA, IA, IL, KY, LA, MA, ME, MI, MN, MS, NC, NH, NJ, OR, RI, SC, TN, TX, and VA.)
Class 3	Terms of service of senators that expired in 1861 (CA, CT, DE, FL, IN, MA, MD, ME, MI, MN, MO, MS, NJ, NY, OH, PA, RI, TN, TX, VA, VT, and WI.)
Class 1	Terms of service of senators that expired in 1863 (AL, AR, CA, CT, FL, GA, IA, IL, IN, KY, LA, MD, MO, NC, NH, NY, OH, OR, PA, SC, VT, and WI.)

== U.S. Senate seniority list ==
U.S. Senate seniority
Rank	Senator (party-state)	Seniority date	Other factors
1	James Alfred Pearce (D-MD)	March 4, 1843	
2	Jesse D. Bright (D-IN)	March 4, 1845	
3	Thomas Jefferson Rusk (D-TX)	February 21, 1846	
4	Samuel Houston (D-TX)	February 26, 1846	
5	Andrew Pickens Butler (D-SC)	December 4, 1846	
6	James M. Mason (D-VA)	January 21, 1847	
7	Stephen A. Douglas (D-IL)	March 4, 1847	
8	Robert M. T. Hunter (D-VA)	March 4, 1847	
9	John Bell (D-TN)	November 22, 1847	
10	William K. Sebastian (D-AR)	May 12, 1848	
11	George Wallace Jones (D-IA)	December 7, 1848	
12	William H. Seward (R-NY)	March 4, 1849	
13	Solomon Foot (R-VT)	March 4, 1851	
14	James A. Bayard Jr. (D-DE)	March 4, 1851	
15	Stephen Mallory (D-FL)	March 4, 1851	
16	Benjamin Wade (R-OH)	March 15, 1851	
17	Charles Sumner (LR-MA)	April 11, 1851	
18	John R. Thomson (D-NJ)	March 4, 1853	
19	Robert Toombs (D-GA)	March 4, 1853	
20	Judah P. Benjamin (D-LA)	March 4, 1853	
21	Josiah J. Evans (D-SC)	March 4, 1853	
21	Charles E. Stuart (D-MI)	March 4, 1853	
22	William Wright (D-NJ)	March 4, 1853	
23	John B. Thompson (KN-KY)	March 4, 1853	
24	Robert Ward Johnson (D-AR)	July 6, 1853	
25	Philip Allen (D-RI)	July 20, 1853	
26	Clement Claiborne Clay (D-AL)	November 29, 1853	
27	John Slidell (D-LA)	December 5, 1853	
28	Albert G. Brown (D-MS)	January 7, 1854	
29	William P. Fessenden (R-ME)	February 10, 1854	
30	David Settle Reid (D-NC)	December 6, 1854	
31	Henry Wilson (R-MA)	January 31, 1855	
32	Lyman Trumbull (R-IL)	March 4, 1855	
33	Jacob Collamer (R-VT)	March 4, 1855	
34	Lafayette S. Foster (R-CT)	March 4, 1855	
35	David Levy Yulee (D-FL)	March 4, 1855	
36	Alfred Iverson, Sr. (D-GA)	March 4, 1855	
37	John Jordan Crittenden (KN-KY)	March 4, 1855	
38	George E. Pugh (D-OH)	March 4, 1855	
39	Charles Durkee (R-WI)	March 4, 1855	
40	Asa Biggs (D-NC)	March 4, 1855	
41	James Bell (R-NH)	March 4, 1855	
42	John P. Hale (R-NH)	July 30, 1855	
43	Benjamin Fitzpatrick (D-AL)	November 26, 1855	
44	William Bigler (D-PA)	January 14, 1856	
45	James S. Green (D-MO)	January 12, 1857	
46	William M. Gwin (D-CA)	January 13, 1857	
47	Martin W. Bates (D-DE)	January 14, 1857	
48	James Harlan (R-IA)	January 29, 1857	
49	Graham N. Fitch (D-IN)	February 4, 1857	
50	Zachariah Chandler (R-MI)	March 4, 1857	
51	James Dixon (R-CT)	March 4, 1857	
52	James R. Doolittle (R-WI)	March 4, 1857	
53	Anthony Kennedy (KN-MD)	March 4, 1857	
54	Trusten Polk (D-MO)	March 4, 1857	
55	Preston King (D-NY)	March 4, 1857	
56	James F. Simmons (R-RI)	March 4, 1857	
57	Hannibal Hamlin (R-ME)	March 4, 1857	
58	David C. Broderick (D-CA)	March 4, 1857	
59	Jefferson Davis (D-MS)	March 4, 1857	
60	Simon Cameron (R-PA)	March 4, 1857	
	Daniel Clark (R-NH)	June 27, 1857	
	Andrew Johnson (D-TN)	October 8, 1857	
	James Pinckney Henderson (D-TX)	November 9, 1857	
	James H. Hammond (D-SC)	December 7, 1857	
	Thomas Lanier Clingman (D-NC)	May 7, 1858	
	Henry Mower Rice (D-MN)	May 11, 1858	
	Arthur P. Hayne (D-SC)	May 11, 1858	
	James Shields (D-MN)	May 11, 1858	
	Matthias Ward (D-TX)	September 27, 1858	
	James Chesnut, Jr. (D-SC)	December 3, 1858	
	Joseph Lane (D-OR)	February 14, 1859	
	Delazon Smith (D-OR)	February 14, 1859	

== See also ==
- 35th United States Congress
- List of United States representatives in the 35th Congress
