= Clement S. Hill =

American politician

Clement Sidney Hill (February 13, 1813 – January 5, 1892) was a United States representative from Kentucky. He was born near Lebanon, Kentucky. He pursued academic studies and attended St. Mary's College, St. Mary, Kentucky. Later, he studied law. Hill was admitted to the bar in 1837 and commenced practice in Lebanon, Kentucky.

Hill was a member of the Kentucky House of Representatives in 1839. He was elected as a Whig to the Thirty-third Congress (1853–1855). After leaving Congress, he resumed the practice of law in Lebanon, Kentucky where he died in 1892. He was buried in St. Augustine's Cemetery.

U.S. House of Representatives
Preceded by James W. Stone	Member of the U.S. House of Representatives from Kentucky's 5th congressional district March 4, 1853 – March 3, 1855	Succeeded by Joshua Jewett
