= Alney McLean =

American politician

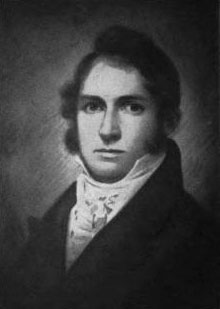

Member of the U.S. House of Representatives from Kentucky's 5th district
- In office March 4, 1819 – March 3, 1821
- Preceded by: Anthony New
- Succeeded by: Anthony New
- In office March 4, 1815 – March 3, 1817
- Preceded by: Samuel Hopkins
- Succeeded by: Anthony New

Member of the Kentucky House of Representatives
- In office 1812–1813

Personal details
- Born: June 10, 1779 Burke County, North Carolina
- Died: December 30, 1841 (aged 62) Greenville, Kentucky
- Resting place: Old Caney Station Cemetery
- Party: Democratic-Republican
- Spouse: Tabitha Russell Campbell
- Occupation: Surveyor
- Profession: Lawyer

Military service
- Branch/service: United States Army
- Years of service: 1812–1815
- Rank: Captain
- Battles/wars: War of 1812

Alney McLean (June 10, 1779 – December 30, 1841) was a United States representative from Kentucky. McLean County, Kentucky, is named in his honor.

== Early life ==
Alney McLean was born to Ephraim and Elizabeth (Davidson) McLean in Burke County, North Carolina, on June 10, 1779. Alney McLean's father, Ephraim, a descendant of Clan Maclean of Isle of Mull, served as a captain at the Battle of Kings Mountain, and received a 600-acre land grant in what is now East Nashville, Nashville Tennessee in payment for his service. Along with Colonel Elijah Robertson, brother of James Robertson (explorer), Ephraim McLean represented what was then Nashville, North Carolina, to the North Carolina General Assembly in 1784, making him one of the earliest officials in what would soon become the state of Tennessee.

Alney McLean's mother, Elizabeth Davidson, was the first cousin of Brigadier General William Lee Davidson, who died fighting Cornwallis at the Battle of Cowan's Ford.

McLean pursued preparatory studies, likely at Davidson Academy (later Peabody College) where Ephraim was a trustee.

At age twenty McLean relocated to Kentucky where he was appointed surveyor of Muhlenberg County, Kentucky. In this capacity, he laid out Greenville, Kentucky, the county seat, and was elected a trustee of that city when it was formed in 1799.

On November 16, 1805, McLean married Tabitha Russell Campbell, daughter of Revolutionary War general William Campbell; the couple had ten children. One of McLean's grandsons, William C. McLean, became an Associate Justice of the Mississippi Supreme Court. McLean's nephews included John McLean (Illinois politician) and "Kentucky Longrifleman" Ephraim McLean Brank, who served with him under Lieutenant Colonel William Mitchusson at the Battle of New Orleans.

Alney McLean's brother in law, Brigadier General Robert Ewing, was elected Justice of the Davidson County Court of Pleas and Quarter Sessions during the period of Andrew Jackson's service as an attorney in Nashville, served as a delegate to the North Carolina Convention to ratify the U.S. Constitution and became Speaker of the Kentucky State Senate. Surviving correspondence appears to indicate the two had a close relationship.

Other close relatives were Linn Boyd, 24th Speaker of the United States House of Representatives; Rev. Finis Ewing, one of the founders of the Cumberland Presbyterian Church; and Illinois' fifth Governor William Lee D. Ewing.

== Political and military career ==
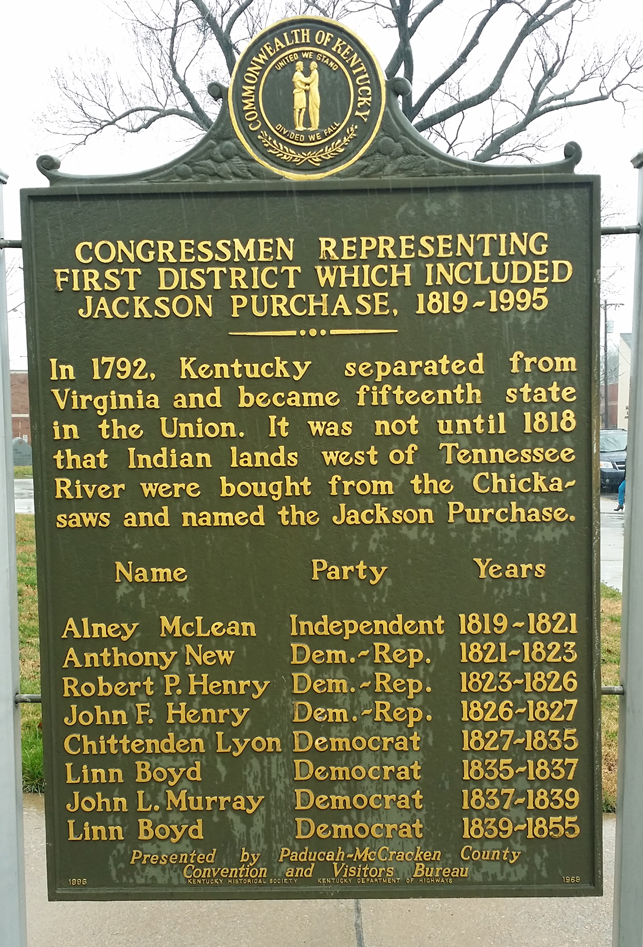
Sign in front of the McCracken, Kentucky Courthouse (in Paducah, Kentucky) commemorating early members of the U.S. House of Representatives representing Jackson Purchase (U.S. historical region). The "First District" in the title actually changed over time. It refers to the Jackson Purchase, which was in the 5th district from 1819 to 1823, the 12th district until 1833, and then the 1st district until the end of the sign's lineage in 1855.

McLean studied law and was admitted to the bar in 1805 and commenced practice in Greenville. He showed little interest in politics until at least 1808. He was first elected to office in 1812, representing Muhlenberg County in the Kentucky House of Representatives from 1812 to 1813.

At the outset of the War of 1812, McLean organized a company of volunteers. Records show that the company was enlisted September 18, 1812. In 1813, he organized a company ultimately commanded by Lewis Kincheloe, then raised another company that he commanded personally under General Samuel Hopkins in his campaigns against the Indians and again under Lieutenant Colonel William Mitchusson at the Battle of New Orleans.

McLean, along with Kentucky Senator John Adair and others, later took offense to General Andrew Jackson's charge that Kentuckians "ingloriously fled" from fighting at New Orleans; he remained a political opponent of Jackson's for the remainder of his career.

McLean was elected as a Republican to the Fourteenth Congress, serving from March 4, 1815, to March 3, 1817. He returned to Congress in 1819, serving in the Sixteenth Congress. After leaving Congress, he was appointed a circuit judge of the fourteenth district of Kentucky, a position he held until his death. As a presidential elector in 1824 and 1832, McLean twice cast his vote for Kentucky's favorite son, Henry Clay. Some credit McLean with helping Clay, with whom he served in two separate Kentucky Congressional delegations, form the Whig Party (United States) in opposition to Jackson.

== Later life ==
Around 1820, McLean and his son William discovered coal on the family farm near the now-defunct town of Paradise. However, at the time, wood was more plentiful and convenient, and the discovery was largely overlooked. In 1830, the McLeans mined some of the coal and sent it to Russellville, Kentucky, on ox wagons and via barges down the Green River to Owensboro, Kentucky, and Evansville, Indiana. The McLean mine was one of the first commercial mines in Muhlenberg County and was later valued above other mines in the county because of its transportation facilities.

McLean died of pneumonia near Greenville, Kentucky, in 1841 and was buried in Old Caney Station Cemetery, near Greenville, Kentucky. McLean County, Kentucky, was formed from Muhlenberg and other counties in 1854 and named in honor of Alney McLean.

U.S. House of Representatives
Preceded by William P. Duval	Member of the U.S. House of Representatives from Kentucky's 5th congressional district March 4, 1815 – March 3, 1817	Succeeded by Anthony New
Preceded by Anthony New	Member of the U.S. House of Representatives from Kentucky's 5th congressional district March 4, 1819 – March 3, 1821	Succeeded by Anthony New
