= Anthony New =

American politician (1747–1833)

Member of the U.S. House of Representatives
- In office March 4, 1821 – March 3, 1823
- Preceded by: Alney McLean
- Succeeded by: John Telemachus Johnson
- Constituency: Kentucky 5th
- In office March 4, 1817 – March 3, 1819
- Preceded by: Alney McLean
- Succeeded by: Alney McLean
- Constituency: Kentucky 5th
- In office March 4, 1811 – March 3, 1813
- Preceded by: Matthew Lyon
- Succeeded by: James Clark
- Constituency: Kentucky 1st
- In office March 4, 1793 – March 3, 1805
- Preceded by: District established
- Succeeded by: James M. Garnett
- Constituency: Virginia 16th (1793–1803); Virginia 11th (1803–1805)

Personal details
- Born: 1747 Gloucester County, Virginia, British America
- Died: March 2, 1833 (aged 85–86) Elkton, Kentucky, U.S.
- Party: Anti-Administration; Democratic-Republican

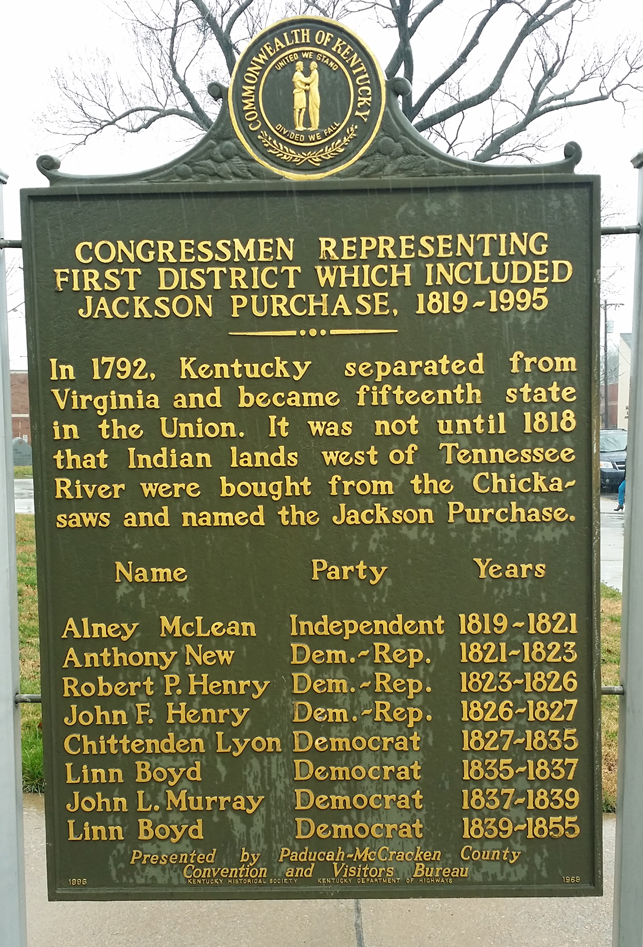
Sign in front of the McCracken, Kentucky Courthouse (in Paducah, Kentucky) commemorating early members of the U.S. House of Representatives representing Jackson Purchase (U.S. historical region). The "First District" in the title actually changed over time. It refers to the Jackson Purchase, which was in the 5th district from 1819 to 1823, the 12th district until 1833, and then the 1st district until the end of the sign's lineage in 1855.

Anthony New (1747 – March 2, 1833) was an American politician and lawyer from Virginia and Kentucky.

== Biography ==
Born in Gloucester County, Virginia, New completed preparatory studies, studied law and was admitted to the bar. During the Revolutionary War, he served as a colonel in the Virginia militia from 1780 to 1781.

He was elected an Anti-Administration to the United States House of Representatives in 1792, serving from 1793 to 1805. New moved to Elkton, Kentucky, and was elected back to the House Democratic-Republican from Kentucky in 1810, serving from 1811 to 1813. He was elected back a third time in 1816, serving from 1817 to 1819 and a fourth time in 1820, serving from 1821 to 1823. Afterwards, he engaged in agricultural pursuits and died at his estate called "Dunheath" near Elkton, Kentucky, on March 2, 1833, and was interred in the family cemetery on the estate.
