= James W. Stone =

American politician

Member of the U.S. House of Representatives from Kentucky's 5th district
- In office March 4, 1843 – – March 3, 1845
- Preceded by: John Burton Thompson
- Succeeded by: Bryan Young
- In office March 4, 1851 – March 3, 1853
- Preceded by: Bryan Young
- Succeeded by: Clement S. Hill

Personal details
- Born: 1813 Taylorsville, Kentucky, U.S.
- Died: October 13, 1854 (aged 40–41) Taylorsville, Kentucky, U.S.

James W. Stone (1813 – October 13, 1854) was a U.S. representative from Kentucky.

Born in Taylorsville, Kentucky, Stone attended the common schools. He studied law. He was admitted to the bar and practiced. Held several local offices. He served as member of the State house of representatives in 1837 and 1839.

Stone was elected as a Democrat to the Twenty-eighth Congress (March 4, 1843 – March 3, 1845). He was an unsuccessful candidate for reelection in 1844 to the Twenty-ninth Congress.

Stone was elected to the Thirty-second Congress (March 4, 1851 – March 3, 1853). He was an unsuccessful candidate for reelection in 1852 to the Thirty-third Congress. He died in Taylorsville, Kentucky, October 13, 1854.

U.S. House of Representatives
Preceded by John B. Thompson	Member of the U.S. House of Representatives from Kentucky's 5th congressional district March 4, 1843 – March 3, 1845	Succeeded by Bryan Young
Preceded by John B. Thompson	Member of the U.S. House of Representatives from Kentucky's 5th congressional district March 4, 1851 – March 3, 1853	Succeeded by Clement S. Hill
