= Aaron Harding =

American politician from Kentucky

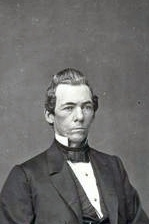
Aaron Harding

Aaron Harding (February 20, 1805 – December 24, 1875), Also known as Aaron Hardin, was a United States representative from Kentucky and a slaveholder. He was born near Campbellsville, in what is now Green County, where he attended rural schools. He became familiar with the classics, studied law, was admitted to the bar in 1833, having commenced his practice in Greensburg, Kentucky. On October 22, 1834, he married Margaret Campbell (November 28, 1818 – February 19, 1858), the niece of Campbellsville founder Andrew Campbell.

Harding was elected prosecuting attorney of Green County in 1833. He was member of the Kentucky House of Representatives in 1840 and was elected as a Unionist to the Thirty-seventh and Thirty-eighth Congresses and as a Democrat to the Thirty-ninth Congress (March 4, 1861 – March 3, 1867). He was a delegate to the Union National Convention in 1866. After leaving Congress, he resumed the practice of law in Danville, Kentucky. He died in Georgetown, Kentucky, in 1875 and was interred at Georgetown Cemetery there.

U.S. House of Representatives
Preceded by William C. Anderson	Member of the U.S. House of Representatives from Kentucky's 4th congressional district March 4, 1861 – March 3, 1867	Succeeded by J. Proctor Knott
