= Bryan Young (politician) =

American politician (1800–1882)

Member of the U.S. House of Representatives from Kentucky's 5th district
- In office March 4, 1845 – March 3, 1847
- Preceded by: James W. Stone
- Succeeded by: John Burton Thompson

Personal details
- Born: January 14, 1800 near Bardstown, Kentucky
- Died: May 14, 1882 (aged 82) Elizabethtown, Kentucky
- Party: Whig
- Relatives: William S. Young (brother); John Y. Brown (nephew)
- Education: University of Louisville
- Occupation: Physician

Bryan Rust Young (born January 14, 1800, near Bardstown, Nelson County, Kentucky – May 14, 1882 in Elizabethtown, Kentucky) was an American Whig Party politician who served as a U.S. representative from Kentucky, representing that state's 5th congressional district for one term in the Twenty-ninth United States Congress, from 1845 to 1847. Young later served several terms in the Kentucky State House of Representatives between 1858 and 1864.

Young came from a political family, being the brother of William Singleton Young and an uncle to John Young Brown.

Outside of his political career, Young practiced medicine, having studied that subject at the University of Louisville. Young owned slaves.

U.S. House of Representatives
Preceded by James W. Stone	Member of the U.S. House of Representatives from Kentucky's 5th congressional district March 4, 1845 – March 3, 1847	Succeeded by John B. Thompson
