= Maurice Thatcher =

American politician (1870–1973)

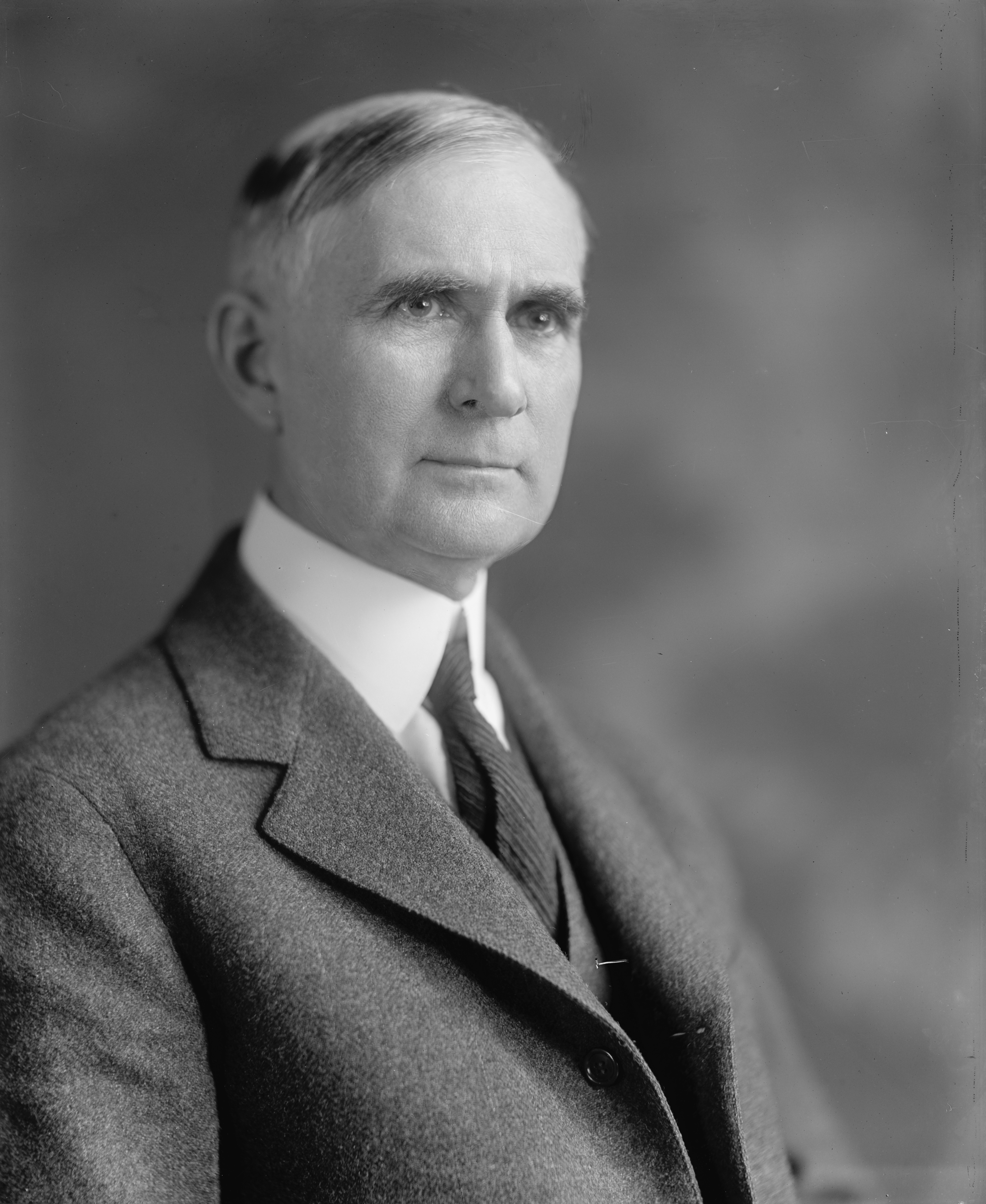
- Thatcher, 1905–1945

Member of the U.S. House of Representatives from Kentucky's 5th district
- In office March 4, 1923 – March 3, 1933
- Preceded by: Charles F. Ogden
- Succeeded by: William Voris Gregory

5th Military Governor of Panama Canal Zone
- In office May 13, 1910 – August 8, 1913
- Appointed by: William Howard Taft
- Preceded by: Joseph Clay Styles Blackburn
- Succeeded by: Richard Lee Metcalfe

Personal details
- Born: Maurice Hudson Thatcher; August 15, 1870 Chicago, Illinois, U.S.
- Died: January 6, 1973 (aged 102) Washington, D.C., U.S.
- Party: Republican

Maurice Hudson Thatcher (August 15, 1870 – January 6, 1973) was an American politician and attorney who was the 5th military governor of the Panama Canal Zone from 1910 to 1913 and a U.S. representative from Kentucky from 1923 to 1933.

== Biography ==
Born in Chicago, Illinois, Thatcher's family moved to Butler County, Kentucky in 1874 and settled near Morgantown. Thatcher worked in farming, on a newspaper and in county offices. He was elected the circuit court clerk for Butler County in 1892 and served from January 1, 1893, until his resignation in 1896. He studied law in Frankfort, Kentucky and was admitted to the bar in 1898, commencing his law practice in Frankfort. Thatcher was an Assistant Attorney General of Kentucky 1898–1900 and then moved to Louisville, Kentucky in 1900. He was an Assistant United States Attorney for the Western District of Kentucky from 1901 to 1906 and a state inspector and examiner for Kentucky 1908–1910.

Thatcher was also a member of the Isthmian Canal Commission and governor of the Canal Zone from 1909 to 1913. Thatcher was the Commission's longest-lived and last surviving member.

During his congressional tenure, he guided the passage of several Kentucky landmarks and parks: Mammoth Cave National Park, Lincoln's birthplace, and the Zachary Taylor National Cemetery. In 1932, he gave up his seat in an unsuccessful attempt to defeat Alben W. Barkley for election to the United States Senate.

Thatcher served as the general counsel of the Gorgas Memorial Institute of Tropical and Preventative Medicine, Inc., in Washington, D.C., beginning in 1939 and became its vice president in 1948, a post he held until 1969 when he was made honorary president, a position previously reserved for Presidents of the United States. In 1962, the first bridge connecting both sides of the Panama Canal was named after him: Thatcher Ferry Bridge. In 1979, the name was officially changed to the Bridge of the Americas.

Thatcher was a vegetarian.

== Legacy ==
As of 2017, he is the second-longest lived person to have served in the United States Congress, having lived to the age of 102 years and 144 days, behind Elizabeth Hawley Gasque, who lived to the age of 103 years, 249 days.

Party political offices
Preceded by Richard P. Ernst	Republican nominee for United States Senator from Kentucky (Class 3); 1932	Succeeded by John P. Haswell
Political offices
Preceded by Joseph Clay Styles Blackburn	Military Governor of the Panama Canal Zone; May 13, 1910 - August 8, 1913	Succeeded by Richard Lee Metcalfe
U.S. House of Representatives
Preceded by Charles F. Ogden	U.S. Congressman, Kentucky's 5th congressional district 1923-1933	Succeeded by William Voris Gregory
