= James Greene Hardy =

American politician

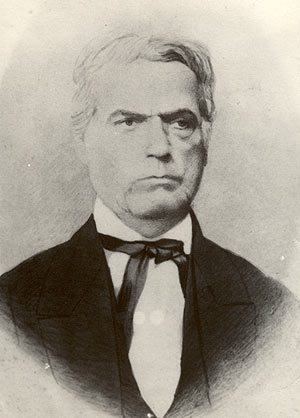

16th Lieutenant Governor of Kentucky
- In office September 4, 1855 – July 16, 1856
- Governor: Charles S. Morehead
- Preceded by: John Burton Thompson
- Succeeded by: Linn Boyd

Personal details
- Born: May 3, 1795 Lunenburg County, Virginia, U.S.
- Died: July 16, 1856 (aged 61)
- Party: Know Nothing

James Greene Hardy (May 3, 1795 – July 16, 1856) was a politician from the U.S. state of Kentucky who belonged to the American or Know-Nothing Party. Prior to being elected the 16th lieutenant governor of Kentucky, he was a prominent surveyor and teacher for many years.

== Early life and family ==
Hardy was born in Lunenburg County, Virginia. A descendant of the Hardy Plantation family of Virginia associated with the Hardy Mill, Hardy was the son of Isham Peter Hardy and Mary 'Polly' Snead, who had married in Lunenberg County on August 14, 1792. Hardy's family migrated from Lunenberg County to what became Hart County, Kentucky, and the family rapidly became heavily involved in local politics, with various family members serving in various local capacities instrumental for establishing basic governmental services in Munfordville, Kentucky, and in what became Hart County, especially circa 1815–1818.

Although Hardy's family had owned many slaves in Virginia, the Kentucky branch of the Hardy family had not brought any slaves from Virginia with them in their migration from Virginia to Kentucky. It is believed by many within the family that the reason for the move from Virginia itself was largely caused over differences in beliefs regarding slavery.

Hardy was married three times. He married his first wife, Elizabeth Edwards, on January 25, 1814, in Barren County. To this marriage were born 10 children (Henrietta, Rebecca Elizabeth, Elizabeth Joan, James Lawrence, Polly Lula, Hester Ann, Samuel Henry, Lucetta Perrin, Mary Sue, and Newton J.). He married his second wife, Elizabeth Jane Jennings, on October 10, 1833, in Barren County. To this marriage were born 2 additional children (Thomas Joel and Martha A. "Mattie".) Hardy was married for the third and final time to Minerva K. Guffey on October 27, 1848, in Barren County, and no children were born to this marriage.

== Political life ==
Hardy moved to near Glasgow, Kentucky to make his own professional future and, later, to begin his political future. It was from Glasgow that he first won and held political office. As a state-level politician, he was strongly supportive of the policies of the Know-Nothing Party in the years just before the Civil War. When asked his position on slavery, he would reply in vague terms that it was certainly a serious matter that he would give careful and measured thought to if elected.

Charles S. Morehead and James G. Hardy ran for Governor and Lt. Governor, respectively, in 1854 on the Know-Nothing Party ticket in the Commonwealth of Kentucky. They both won election, and Gov. Morehead served from 1855 until 1859, completing his term. Hardy, though, died before completing his term on July 16, 1856, serving only from 1855 to 1856, and his body was sent by rail to Glasgow, KY. A large funeral procession went out from Glasgow, and he was buried on his farm estate in an above-ground mausoleum near Rock Springs Baptist Church, amidst a crowd of several hundred local citizens who accompanied the final procession to pay their respects.

An historical marker honoring Hardy is located today on the west side of U.S. Route 31W roughly 13 miles north of Glasgow, near Rock Springs Baptist Church and the Hardy homeplace/cemetery. The land for Rock Springs Baptist Church, near the Hart and Barren County line, and near the Hardy homeplace and Hardy School, was donated by the Hardy family. Hardyville, Kentucky in Hart County was named in his honor, commemorating a series of popular stump speeches that he gave in the area while campaigning for political office.

Political offices
Preceded by John Burton Thompson	Lieutenant Governor of Kentucky; 1855–1856	Succeeded by Linn Boyd
