= Kentucky's 5th congressional district =

U.S. House district for Kentucky

Coordinates: 37°22′08″N 83°31′19″W

- Interactive map of district boundaries since January 3, 2023
- Representative: Hal Rogers; R–Somerset
- Distribution: 76.49% rural; 23.51% urban
- Population (2025): 738,023
- Median household income: $48,708
- Ethnicity: 93.7% White; 2.6% Two or more races; 1.5% Hispanic; 1.4% Black; 0.4% Asian; 0.3% other
- Cook PVI: R+32

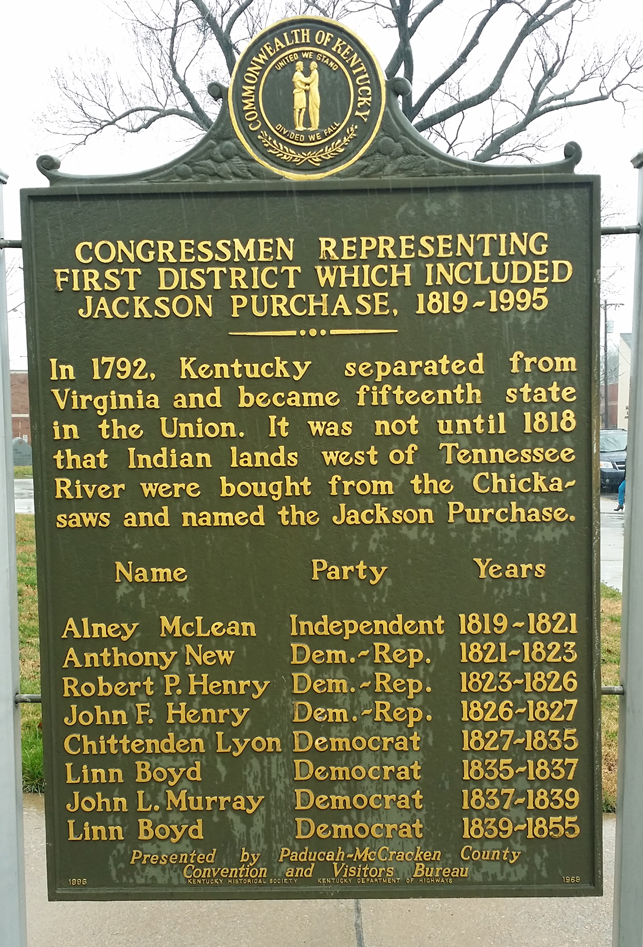
Sign in front of the McCracken, Kentucky Courthouse (in Paducah, Kentucky) commemorating early members of the U.S. House of Representatives representing Jackson Purchase (U.S. historical region). The "First District" in the title actually changed over time. It refers to the Jackson Purchase, which was in the 5th district from 1819 to 1823, the 12th district until 1833, and then the 1st district until the end of the sign's lineage in 1855.

Kentucky's 5th congressional district is a U.S. House district located in southeastern Kentucky, which represents much of the Eastern Kentucky Coalfield in the heart of Appalachia. The rural district as of the 2010 U.S. census, has the highest percentage of White Americans in the nation. It is the second poorest congressional district in the United States, with a median income of $44,175, per a 2024 study. It has been represented by Republican Hal Rogers since 1981.

The district contains the counties of Bell, Boyd, Breathitt, Clay, Elliott, Floyd, Harlan, Jackson, Johnson, Knott, Knox, Laurel, Lawrence, Lee, Lincoln, Leslie, Letcher, Magoffin, Martin, McCreary, Menifee, Morgan, Owsley, Perry, Pike, Pulaski, Rockcastle, Rowan, Wayne, Whitley, Wolfe, and parts of Bath, and Carter counties. Within the district are the economic leading cities of Ashland, Pikeville, Prestonsburg, Middlesboro, Hazard, Jackson, Morehead, London, and Somerset. It is the most rural district in the United States, with 76.49% of its population in rural areas.

With a Cook Partisan Voting Index rating of R+32, it is the most Republican district in Kentucky. The 5th congressional district is one of the few ancestrally Republican regions south of the Ohio River. Much of the region now in the district strongly supported the Union in the Civil War, and identified with the Republicans after hostilities ceased. By contrast, the northeastern portion of the district borders West Virginia. Much of this section of the district was once part of the 7th congressional district, long a Democratic stronghold, which was disbanded in 1992 after the 1990 census. Geographically, the district consists of flat land areas to the west, to Appalachia highland mountains to the east and southeast. To the north and northeast of the district are rolling hills that end at the Ohio River.

Despite the district's strong Republican lean, it features Elliott County, which, before being carried by Donald Trump in 2016, had never voted for a Republican president since its founding in 1869, making it the longest Democratic voting streak. Until 2018, when the county gave Rogers 54.6% of its vote, the county had never voted for Rogers in a contested election, despite him winning at least 65% of the vote in the district in every election except 1992.

Rogers is the dean of the Kentucky delegation and of the entire House of Representatives. Due in part to his seniority, Rogers has served in a number of leadership positions in the chamber.

== Voter registration ==
On January 1, 2026, the district had 541,908 registered voters, who were registered with the following parties.

Party	Registration	
Party	Voters	%
Republican	314,193	57.98
Democratic	187,626	34.62
Independent	20,197	3.73
Libertarian	1,773	0.33
Green	231	0.04
Constitution	205	0.04
Socialist Workers	70	0.01
Reform	25	0.00
"Other"	17,588	3.25
Total	541,908	100.00

== Recent election results from statewide races ==
Year	Office	Results
2008	President	McCain 65% - 33%
2012	President	Romney 75% - 25%
2016	President	Trump 78% - 19%
2016	Senate	Paul 65% - 35%
2019	Governor	Bevin 59% - 38%
2019	Attorney General	Cameron 67% - 33%
2020	President	Trump 79% - 20%
2020	Senate	McConnell 73% - 23%
2022	Senate	Paul 75% - 25%
2023	Governor	Cameron 58% - 42%
2023	Attorney General	Coleman 72% - 28%
2023	Auditor of Public Accounts	Ball 74% - 26%
2023	Secretary of State	Adams 73% - 27%
2023	Treasurer	Metcalf 70% - 30%
2024	President	Trump 81% - 17%

== Composition ==
For the 118th and successive Congresses (based on redistricting following the 2020 census), the district contains all or portions of the following counties and communities:

Bath County (3)

All 3 communities

Bell County (3)

All 3 communities

Boyd County (5)

All 5 communities

Breathitt County (1)

Jackson

Carter County (2)

Grayson, Olive Hill

Clay County (3)

All 3 communities

Elliott County (1)

Sandy Hook

Floyd County (10)

All 10 communities

Harlan County (13)

All 13 communities

Jackson County (2)

Annville, McKee

Johnson County (1)

Paintsville

Knott County (3)

All 3 communities

Knox County (5)

All 5 communities

Laurel County (4)

All 4 communities

Lawrence County (2)

Blaine, Louisa

Lee County (1)

Beattyville

Leslie County (1)

Hyden

Letcher County (8)

All 8 communities

Lincoln County (6)

All 6 communities

McCreary County (3)

All 3 communities

Magoffin County (1)

Salyersville

Martin County (2)

Inez, Warfield

Menifee County (1)

Frenchburg

Morgan County (2)

Ezel, West Liberty

Owsley County (1)

Booneville

Perry County (6)

All 6 communities

Pike County (9)

All 9 communities

Pulaski County (5)

All 5 communities

Rockcastle County (3)

All 3 communities

Rowan County (3)

All 3 communities

Wayne County (1)

Monticello

Whitley County (5)

All 5 counties

Wolfe County (2)

Campton, Hazel Green

== List of members representing the district ==
Member	Party	Years	Cong ress	Electoral history	Location
District created March 4, 1803
John Fowler (Lexington)	Democratic-Republican	March 4, 1803 – March 3, 1807	8th 9th	Redistricted from the 2nd district and re-elected in 1803. Re-elected in 1804. Retired.	1803–1813; Clarke, Fayette, Jessamine, Montgomery, and Woodford counties
Benjamin Howard (Lexington)	Democratic-Republican	March 4, 1807 – April 10, 1810	10th 11th	Elected in 1806. Re-elected in 1808. Resigned to become governor of the Louisiana Territory.	1803–1813; Clarke, Fayette, Jessamine, Montgomery, and Woodford counties
William T. Barry (Lexington)	Democratic-Republican	August 8, 1810 – March 3, 1811	11th	Elected to finish Howard's term. Retired.	1803–1813; Clarke, Fayette, Jessamine, Montgomery, and Woodford counties
Henry Clay (Lexington)	Democratic-Republican	March 4, 1811 – March 3, 1813	12th	Elected in 1810. Redistricted to the 2nd district.	1803–1813; Clarke, Fayette, Jessamine, Montgomery, and Woodford counties
Samuel Hopkins (Henderson)	Democratic-Republican	March 4, 1813 – March 3, 1815	13th	Elected in 1812. Retired.	1813–1823; Breckinridge, Caldwell, Christian, Grayson, Henderson, Hopkins, Livingston, Muhlenberg, Ohio, and Union counties
Alney McLean (Greenville)	Democratic-Republican	March 4, 1815 – March 3, 1817	14th	Elected in 1814. Retired.	1813–1823; Breckinridge, Caldwell, Christian, Grayson, Henderson, Hopkins, Livingston, Muhlenberg, Ohio, and Union counties
Anthony New (Elkton)	Democratic-Republican	March 4, 1817 – March 3, 1819	15th	Elected in 1816. Retired.	1813–1823; Breckinridge, Caldwell, Christian, Grayson, Henderson, Hopkins, Livingston, Muhlenberg, Ohio, and Union counties
Alney McLean (Greenville)	Democratic-Republican	March 4, 1819 – March 3, 1821	16th	Elected in 1818. Retired.	1813–1823; Breckinridge, Caldwell, Christian, Grayson, Henderson, Hopkins, Livingston, Muhlenberg, Ohio, and Union counties
Anthony New (Elkton)	Democratic-Republican	March 4, 1821 – March 3, 1823	17th	Elected in 1820. Retired.	1813–1823; Breckinridge, Caldwell, Christian, Grayson, Henderson, Hopkins, Livingston, Muhlenberg, Ohio, and Union counties
John T. Johnson (Georgetown)	Democratic-Republican	March 4, 1823 – March 3, 1825	18th	Redistricted from the 3rd district and re-elected in 1822. Retired.	1823–1833 [data missing]
James Johnson (Great Crossings)	Jacksonian	March 4, 1825 – August 13, 1826	19th	Elected in 1824. Died.	1823–1833 [data missing]
Vacant		August 13, 1826 – December 7, 1826			1823–1833 [data missing]
Robert L. McHatton (Georgetown)	Jacksonian	December 7, 1826 – March 3, 1829	19th 20th	Elected to finish Johnson's term. Re-elected in 1827. Retired.	1823–1833 [data missing]
Richard M. Johnson (Great Crossings)	Jacksonian	March 4, 1829 – March 3, 1833	21st 22nd	Elected in 1829. Re-elected in 1831. Redistricted to the 13th district.	1823–1833 [data missing]
Vacant		March 4, 1833 – August 6, 1834	23rd	House declared new election after election was contested.	1833–1843; Garrard County added to the district.
Robert P. Letcher (Lancaster)	Anti-Jacksonian	August 6, 1834 – March 3, 1835	23rd	Elected to finish the vacant term. Retired.	1833–1843; Garrard County added to the district.
James Harlan (Harrodsburg)	Anti-Jacksonian	March 4, 1835 – March 3, 1837	24th 25th	Elected in 1835. Re-elected in 1837. Retired.	1833–1843; Garrard County added to the district.
James Harlan (Harrodsburg)	Whig	March 4, 1837 – March 3, 1839	24th 25th	Elected in 1835. Re-elected in 1837. Retired.	1833–1843; Garrard County added to the district.
Simeon H. Anderson (Lancaster)	Whig	March 4, 1839 – August 11, 1840	26th	Elected in 1839. Died.	1833–1843; Garrard County added to the district.
Vacant		August 11, 1840 – December 7, 1840			1833–1843; Garrard County added to the district.
John B. Thompson (Harrodsburg)	Whig	December 7, 1840 – March 3, 1843	26th 27th	Elected to finish Anderson's term. Re-elected in 1841. Retired.	1833–1843; Garrard County added to the district.
James W. Stone (Taylorsville)	Democratic	March 4, 1843 – March 3, 1845	28th	Elected in 1843. Lost re-election.	1843–1853 [data missing]
Bryan Young (Elizabethtown)	Whig	March 4, 1845 – March 3, 1847	29th	Elected in 1845. Retired.	1843–1853 [data missing]
John B. Thompson (Harrodsburg)	Whig	March 4, 1847 – March 3, 1851	30th 31st	Elected in 1847. Re-elected in 1849. Retired.	1843–1853 [data missing]
James W. Stone (Elizabethtown)	Democratic	March 4, 1851 – March 3, 1853	32nd	Elected in 1851. Lost re-election.	1843–1853 [data missing]
Clement S. Hill (Lebanon)	Whig	March 4, 1853 – March 3, 1855	33rd	Elected in 1853. Retired.	1853–1863 [data missing]
Joshua Jewett (Elizabethtown)	Democratic	March 4, 1855 – March 3, 1859	34th 35th	Elected in 1855. Re-elected in 1857. Lost re-election as an Opposition Party candidate.	1853–1863 [data missing]
Vacant		March 4, 1859 – December 3, 1860	36th		1853–1863 [data missing]
John Y. Brown (Elizabethtown)	Democratic	December 3, 1860 – March 3, 1861	36th	Elected in 1859 but did not take seat until 2nd session because did not meet age requirement for office. Retired.	1853–1863 [data missing]
Charles A. Wickliffe (Bardstown)	Union Democratic	March 4, 1861 – March 3, 1863	37th	Elected in 1861. Retired.	1853–1863 [data missing]
Robert Mallory (La Grange)	Union Democratic	March 4, 1863 – March 3, 1865	38th	Redistricted from the 7th district and re-elected in 1863. Lost re-election.	1863–1873 [data missing]
Lovell Rousseau (Louisville)	Unconditional Union	March 4, 1865 – July 21, 1866	39th	Elected in 1865. Resigned following his assault of Rep. Josiah Grinnell.	1863–1873 [data missing]
Vacant		July 21, 1866 – December 3, 1866	39th		1863–1873 [data missing]
Lovell Rousseau (Louisville)	Unconditional Union	December 3, 1866 – March 3, 1867	39th	Elected to finish his own term. Lost re-election.	1863–1873 [data missing]
Asa Grover (Louisville)	Democratic	March 4, 1867 – March 3, 1869	40th	Elected in 1867. Retired.	1863–1873 [data missing]
Boyd Winchester (Louisville)	Democratic	March 4, 1869 – March 3, 1873	41st 42nd	Elected in 1868. Re-elected in 1870. Retired.	1863–1873 [data missing]
Elisha Standiford (Louisville)	Democratic	March 4, 1873 – March 3, 1875	43rd	Elected in 1872. Renominated but declined.	1873–1883 [data missing]
Edward Y. Parsons (Louisville)	Democratic	March 4, 1875 – July 8, 1876	44th	Elected in 1874. Died.	1873–1883 [data missing]
Vacant		July 8, 1876 – August 12, 1876	44th		1873–1883 [data missing]
Henry Watterson (Louisville)	Democratic	August 12, 1876 – March 3, 1877	44th	Elected to finish Parsons's term. Retired.	1873–1883 [data missing]
Albert S. Willis (Louisville)	Democratic	March 4, 1877 – March 3, 1887	45th 46th 47th 48th 49th	Elected in 1876. Re-elected in 1878. Re-elected in 1880. Re-elected in 1882. Re-elected in 1884. Lost renomination.	1873–1883 [data missing]
Albert S. Willis (Louisville)	Democratic	March 4, 1877 – March 3, 1887	45th 46th 47th 48th 49th	Elected in 1876. Re-elected in 1878. Re-elected in 1880. Re-elected in 1882. Re-elected in 1884. Lost renomination.	1883–1893 [data missing]
Asher G. Caruth (Louisville)	Democratic	March 4, 1887 – March 3, 1895	50th 51st 52nd 53rd	Elected in 1886. Re-elected in 1888. Re-elected in 1890. Re-elected in 1892. Lost renomination.	1883–1893 [data missing]
Asher G. Caruth (Louisville)	Democratic	March 4, 1887 – March 3, 1895	50th 51st 52nd 53rd	Elected in 1886. Re-elected in 1888. Re-elected in 1890. Re-elected in 1892. Lost renomination.	1893–1903 [data missing]
Walter Evans (Louisville)	Republican	March 4, 1895 – March 3, 1899	54th 55th	Elected in 1894. Re-elected in 1896. Lost re-election.	1893–1903 [data missing]
Oscar Turner (Louisville)	Democratic	March 4, 1899 – March 3, 1901	56th	Elected in 1898. Retired.	1893–1903 [data missing]
Harvey S. Irwin (Louisville)	Republican	March 4, 1901 – March 3, 1903	57th	Elected in 1900. Lost re-election.	1893–1903 [data missing]
J. Swagar Sherley (Louisville)	Democratic	March 4, 1903 – March 3, 1919	58th 59th 60th 61st 62nd 63rd 64th 65th	Elected in 1902. Re-elected in 1904. Re-elected in 1906. Re-elected in 1908. Re-elected in 1910. Re-elected in 1912. Re-elected in 1914. Re-elected in 1916. Lost re-election.	1903–1913 [data missing]
J. Swagar Sherley (Louisville)	Democratic	March 4, 1903 – March 3, 1919	58th 59th 60th 61st 62nd 63rd 64th 65th	Elected in 1902. Re-elected in 1904. Re-elected in 1906. Re-elected in 1908. Re-elected in 1910. Re-elected in 1912. Re-elected in 1914. Re-elected in 1916. Lost re-election.	1913–1933; Jefferson County.
Charles F. Ogden (Louisville)	Republican	March 4, 1919 – March 3, 1923	66th 67th	Elected in 1918. Re-elected in 1920. Retired.	1913–1933; Jefferson County.
Maurice Thatcher (Louisville)	Republican	March 4, 1923 – March 3, 1933	68th 69th 70th 71st 72nd	Elected in 1922. Re-elected in 1924. Re-elected in 1926. Re-elected in 1928. Re-elected in 1930. Retired to run for U.S. Senator.	1913–1933; Jefferson County.
District inactive		March 4, 1933 – January 3, 1935	73rd		
Brent Spence (Fort Thomas)	Democratic	January 3, 1935 – January 3, 1963	74th 75th 76th 77th 78th 79th 80th 81st 82nd 83rd 84th 85th 86th 87th	Redistricted from the at-large district and re-elected in 1934. Re-elected in 1936. Re-elected in 1938. Re-elected in 1940. Re-elected in 1942. Re-elected in 1944. Re-elected in 1946. Re-elected in 1948. Re-elected in 1950. Re-elected in 1952. Re-elected in 1954. Re-elected in 1956. Re-elected in 1958. Re-elected in 1960. Retired.	1935–1953
Brent Spence (Fort Thomas)	Democratic	January 3, 1935 – January 3, 1963	74th 75th 76th 77th 78th 79th 80th 81st 82nd 83rd 84th 85th 86th 87th	Redistricted from the at-large district and re-elected in 1934. Re-elected in 1936. Re-elected in 1938. Re-elected in 1940. Re-elected in 1942. Re-elected in 1944. Re-elected in 1946. Re-elected in 1948. Re-elected in 1950. Re-elected in 1952. Re-elected in 1954. Re-elected in 1956. Re-elected in 1958. Re-elected in 1960. Retired.	1953–1957
Brent Spence (Fort Thomas)	Democratic	January 3, 1935 – January 3, 1963	74th 75th 76th 77th 78th 79th 80th 81st 82nd 83rd 84th 85th 86th 87th	Redistricted from the at-large district and re-elected in 1934. Re-elected in 1936. Re-elected in 1938. Re-elected in 1940. Re-elected in 1942. Re-elected in 1944. Re-elected in 1946. Re-elected in 1948. Re-elected in 1950. Re-elected in 1952. Re-elected in 1954. Re-elected in 1956. Re-elected in 1958. Re-elected in 1960. Retired.	1957–1963
Eugene Siler (Williamsburg)	Republican	January 3, 1963 – January 3, 1965	88th	Redistricted from the 8th district and re-elected in 1962. Retired.	1963–1967
Tim Lee Carter (Tompkinsville)	Republican	January 3, 1965 – January 3, 1981	89th 90th 91st 92nd 93rd 94th 95th 96th	Elected in 1964. Re-elected in 1966. Re-elected in 1968. Re-elected in 1970. Re-elected in 1972. Re-elected in 1974. Re-elected in 1976. Re-elected in 1978. Retired.	1963–1967
Tim Lee Carter (Tompkinsville)	Republican	January 3, 1965 – January 3, 1981	89th 90th 91st 92nd 93rd 94th 95th 96th	Elected in 1964. Re-elected in 1966. Re-elected in 1968. Re-elected in 1970. Re-elected in 1972. Re-elected in 1974. Re-elected in 1976. Re-elected in 1978. Retired.	1967–1973
Tim Lee Carter (Tompkinsville)	Republican	January 3, 1965 – January 3, 1981	89th 90th 91st 92nd 93rd 94th 95th 96th	Elected in 1964. Re-elected in 1966. Re-elected in 1968. Re-elected in 1970. Re-elected in 1972. Re-elected in 1974. Re-elected in 1976. Re-elected in 1978. Retired.	1973–1983
Hal Rogers (Somerset)	Republican	January 3, 1981 – present	97th 98th 99th 100th 101st 102nd 103rd 104th 105th 106th 107th 108th 109th 110th 111th 112th 113th 114th 115th 116th 117th 118th 119th	Elected in 1980. Re-elected in 1982. Re-elected in 1984. Re-elected in 1986. Re-elected in 1988. Re-elected in 1990. Re-elected in 1992. Re-elected in 1994. Re-elected in 1996. Re-elected in 1998. Re-elected in 2000. Re-elected in 2002. Re-elected in 2004. Re-elected in 2006. Re-elected in 2008. Re-elected in 2010. Re-elected in 2012. Re-elected in 2014. Re-elected in 2016. Re-elected in 2018. Re-elected in 2020. Re-elected in 2022. Re-elected in 2024. Re-elected in 2026.	1973–1983
Hal Rogers (Somerset)	Republican	January 3, 1981 – present	97th 98th 99th 100th 101st 102nd 103rd 104th 105th 106th 107th 108th 109th 110th 111th 112th 113th 114th 115th 116th 117th 118th 119th	Elected in 1980. Re-elected in 1982. Re-elected in 1984. Re-elected in 1986. Re-elected in 1988. Re-elected in 1990. Re-elected in 1992. Re-elected in 1994. Re-elected in 1996. Re-elected in 1998. Re-elected in 2000. Re-elected in 2002. Re-elected in 2004. Re-elected in 2006. Re-elected in 2008. Re-elected in 2010. Re-elected in 2012. Re-elected in 2014. Re-elected in 2016. Re-elected in 2018. Re-elected in 2020. Re-elected in 2022. Re-elected in 2024. Re-elected in 2026.	1983–1993
Hal Rogers (Somerset)	Republican	January 3, 1981 – present	97th 98th 99th 100th 101st 102nd 103rd 104th 105th 106th 107th 108th 109th 110th 111th 112th 113th 114th 115th 116th 117th 118th 119th	Elected in 1980. Re-elected in 1982. Re-elected in 1984. Re-elected in 1986. Re-elected in 1988. Re-elected in 1990. Re-elected in 1992. Re-elected in 1994. Re-elected in 1996. Re-elected in 1998. Re-elected in 2000. Re-elected in 2002. Re-elected in 2004. Re-elected in 2006. Re-elected in 2008. Re-elected in 2010. Re-elected in 2012. Re-elected in 2014. Re-elected in 2016. Re-elected in 2018. Re-elected in 2020. Re-elected in 2022. Re-elected in 2024. Re-elected in 2026.	1993–1997
Hal Rogers (Somerset)	Republican	January 3, 1981 – present	97th 98th 99th 100th 101st 102nd 103rd 104th 105th 106th 107th 108th 109th 110th 111th 112th 113th 114th 115th 116th 117th 118th 119th	Elected in 1980. Re-elected in 1982. Re-elected in 1984. Re-elected in 1986. Re-elected in 1988. Re-elected in 1990. Re-elected in 1992. Re-elected in 1994. Re-elected in 1996. Re-elected in 1998. Re-elected in 2000. Re-elected in 2002. Re-elected in 2004. Re-elected in 2006. Re-elected in 2008. Re-elected in 2010. Re-elected in 2012. Re-elected in 2014. Re-elected in 2016. Re-elected in 2018. Re-elected in 2020. Re-elected in 2022. Re-elected in 2024. Re-elected in 2026.	1997–2003
Hal Rogers (Somerset)	Republican	January 3, 1981 – present	97th 98th 99th 100th 101st 102nd 103rd 104th 105th 106th 107th 108th 109th 110th 111th 112th 113th 114th 115th 116th 117th 118th 119th	Elected in 1980. Re-elected in 1982. Re-elected in 1984. Re-elected in 1986. Re-elected in 1988. Re-elected in 1990. Re-elected in 1992. Re-elected in 1994. Re-elected in 1996. Re-elected in 1998. Re-elected in 2000. Re-elected in 2002. Re-elected in 2004. Re-elected in 2006. Re-elected in 2008. Re-elected in 2010. Re-elected in 2012. Re-elected in 2014. Re-elected in 2016. Re-elected in 2018. Re-elected in 2020. Re-elected in 2022. Re-elected in 2024. Re-elected in 2026.	2003–2013
Hal Rogers (Somerset)	Republican	January 3, 1981 – present	97th 98th 99th 100th 101st 102nd 103rd 104th 105th 106th 107th 108th 109th 110th 111th 112th 113th 114th 115th 116th 117th 118th 119th	Elected in 1980. Re-elected in 1982. Re-elected in 1984. Re-elected in 1986. Re-elected in 1988. Re-elected in 1990. Re-elected in 1992. Re-elected in 1994. Re-elected in 1996. Re-elected in 1998. Re-elected in 2000. Re-elected in 2002. Re-elected in 2004. Re-elected in 2006. Re-elected in 2008. Re-elected in 2010. Re-elected in 2012. Re-elected in 2014. Re-elected in 2016. Re-elected in 2018. Re-elected in 2020. Re-elected in 2022. Re-elected in 2024. Re-elected in 2026.	2013–2023
Hal Rogers (Somerset)	Republican	January 3, 1981 – present	97th 98th 99th 100th 101st 102nd 103rd 104th 105th 106th 107th 108th 109th 110th 111th 112th 113th 114th 115th 116th 117th 118th 119th	Elected in 1980. Re-elected in 1982. Re-elected in 1984. Re-elected in 1986. Re-elected in 1988. Re-elected in 1990. Re-elected in 1992. Re-elected in 1994. Re-elected in 1996. Re-elected in 1998. Re-elected in 2000. Re-elected in 2002. Re-elected in 2004. Re-elected in 2006. Re-elected in 2008. Re-elected in 2010. Re-elected in 2012. Re-elected in 2014. Re-elected in 2016. Re-elected in 2018. Re-elected in 2020. Re-elected in 2022. Re-elected in 2024. Re-elected in 2026.	2023–present

== Recent election results ==
=== 2002 ===
Kentucky's 5th Congressional District Election (2002)
Party	Candidate	Votes	%
Republican	Hal Rogers*	137,986	78.29
Democratic	Sidney Jane Bailey	38,254	21.71
Total votes		176,240	100.00
Republican hold			

=== 2004 ===
Kentucky's 5th Congressional District Election (2004)
Party	Candidate	Votes	%
Republican	Hal Rogers*	177,579	100.00
Total votes		177,579	100.00
Republican hold			

=== 2006 ===
Kentucky's 5th Congressional District Election (2006)
Party	Candidate	Votes	%
Republican	Hal Rogers*	147,261	73.76
Democratic	Kenneth Stepp	52,384	26.24
Total votes		199,645	100.00
Republican hold			

=== 2008 ===
Kentucky's 5th Congressional District Election (2008)
Party	Candidate	Votes	%
Republican	Hal Rogers*	177,024	84.11
Independent	Jim Holbert	33,444	15.89
Total votes		210,468	100.00
Republican hold			

=== 2010 ===
Kentucky's 5th Congressional District Election (2010)
Party	Candidate	Votes	%
Republican	Hal Rogers*	151,019	77.43
Democratic	Jim Holbert	44,034	22.58
Total votes		195,053	100.00
Republican hold			

=== 2012 ===
Kentucky's 5th Congressional District Election (2012)
Party	Candidate	Votes	%
Republican	Hal Rogers*	195,408	77.90
Democratic	Kenneth S. Stepp	55,447	22.10
Total votes		250,855	100.00
Republican hold			

=== 2014 ===
Kentucky's 5th Congressional District Election (2014)
Party	Candidate	Votes	%
Republican	Hal Rogers*	171,350	78.30
Democratic	Kenneth S. Stepp	47,617	21.70
Total votes		218,967	100.00
Republican hold			

=== 2016 ===
Kentucky's 5th Congressional District Election (2016)
Party	Candidate	Votes	%
Republican	Hal Rogers*	221,242	100.00
Total votes		221,242	100.00
Republican hold			

=== 2018 ===
Kentucky's 5th Congressional District Election (2018)
Party	Candidate	Votes	%
Republican	Hal Rogers*	172,093	78.9
Democratic	Kenneth Stepp	45,890	21.0
Independent	Bill Ray (write-in)	34	0.1
Total votes		218,017	100.0
Republican hold			

=== 2020 ===
Kentucky's 5th Congressional District Election (2020)
Party	Candidate	Votes	%
Republican	Hal Rogers*	250,660	84.2
Democratic	Matthew Best	46,993	15.8
Total votes		297,653	100.0
Republican hold			

=== 2022 ===
Kentucky's 5th Congressional District Election (2022)
Party	Candidate	Votes	%
Republican	Hal Rogers*	177,712	82.1
Democratic	Conor Halblieb	38,549	17.8
	Stephan William (write-in)	9	0.004
Total votes		216,270	100
Republican hold			

=== 2024 ===
Kentucky's 5th Congressional District Election (2024)
Party	Candidate	Votes	%
Republican	Hal Rogers*	261,407	100.00
Total votes		261,407	100.00
Republican hold			

== See also ==
- Kentucky's congressional districts
- List of United States congressional districts
