= William Clayton Anderson =

American politician

William C. Anderson

Member of the U.S. House of Representatives from Kentucky's 4th district
- In office March 4, 1859 – March 3, 1861
- Preceded by: Albert G. Talbott
- Succeeded by: Aaron Harding

Member of the Kentucky House of Representatives from Boyle County
- In office August 5, 1861 – December 23, 1861
- Preceded by: Alexander H. Sneed Jr.
- Succeeded by: Joshua Fry Bell
- In office August 4, 1851 – August 6, 1855
- Preceded by: Albert G. Talbott
- Succeeded by: George F. Lee

Personal details
- Born: December 26, 1826 Lancaster, Kentucky, US
- Died: December 23, 1861 (aged 34) Frankfort, Kentucky, US
- Resting place: Bellevue Cemetery, Danville, Kentucky, US
- Party: American Party, Unionist and Opposition Party
- Parent: Simeon H. Anderson
- Relatives: Margaret Anderson Watts (sister); Albert G. Talbott (uncle)
- Education: Centre College
- Occupation: Lawyer, Politician

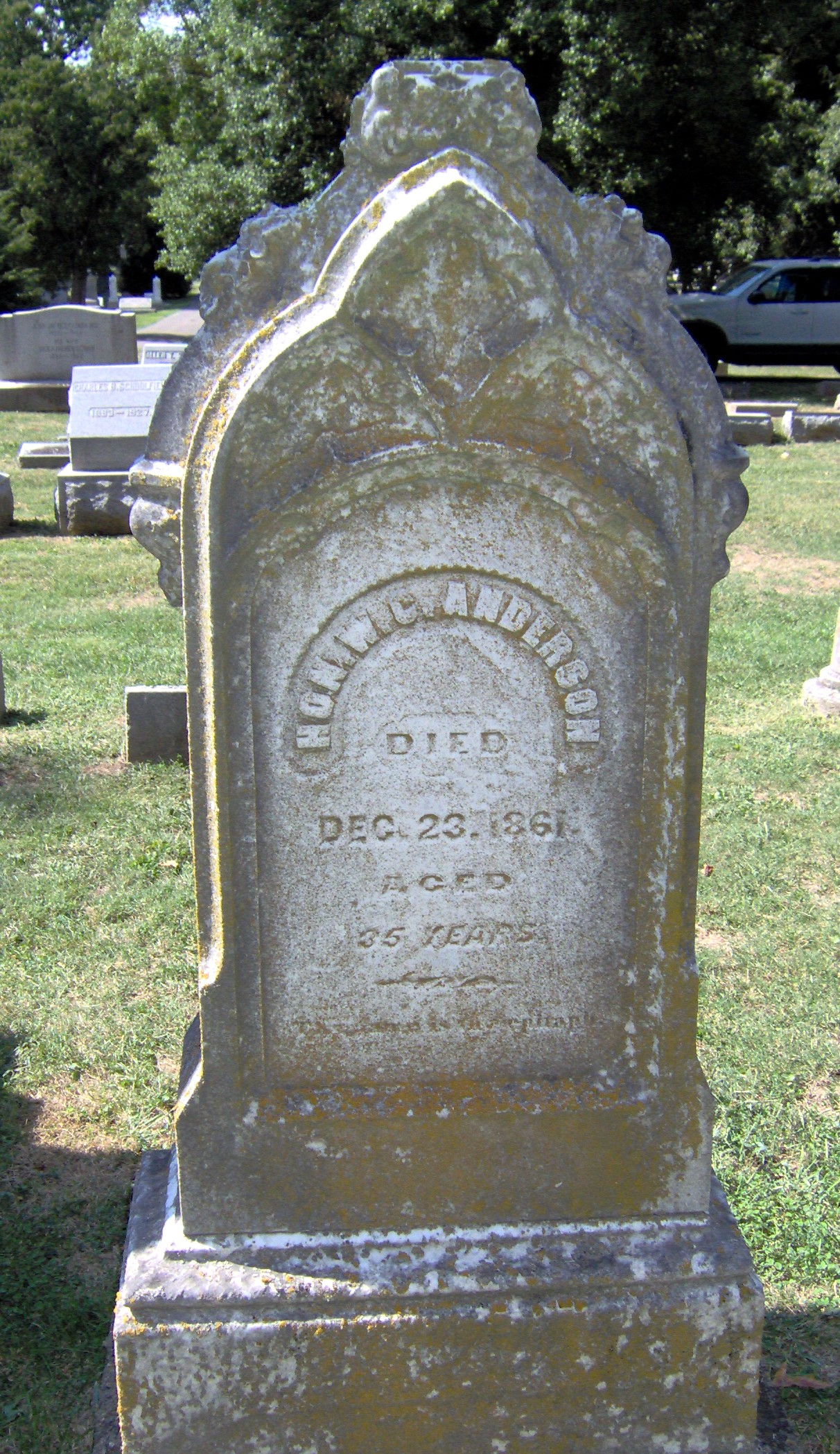
Gravestone of Rep. William Clayton Anderson located in Bellevue Cemetery, Danville, Kentucky.

William Clayton Anderson (December 26, 1826 – December 23, 1861) was a nineteenth-century slave owner, lawyer, and politician. He served as a United States representative from Kentucky.

== Early life and career ==
Anderson was born in Lancaster, Garrard County, Kentucky, the son of Simeon H. Anderson and nephew of Albert G. Talbott. He attended private schools and graduated from Centre College, Danville, Kentucky, in 1845. He then studied law and was admitted to the bar. He began his practice in Lancaster and in 1847 moved to Danville and continued practicing law.

Anderson served as a member of the Kentucky House of Representatives from 1851 to 1855 and again in 1861. He was a presidential elector on the American Party ticket of Millard Fillmore and Donaldson in 1856. An unsuccessful candidate for the Thirty-fifth Congress, Anderson was elected two years later as an Opposition Party candidate to the Thirty-sixth Congress, serving from March 4, 1859, to March 3, 1861. He chose not to seek reelection; and was elected instead as a Unionist candidate to the Kentucky House of Representatives.

== Death ==
Anderson died on December 23, 1861, while on the house floor during a session of the legislature in Frankfort, Kentucky . He died three days before he would have been 35 years old. He is interred at Bellevue Cemetery in Danville, Kentucky.

U.S. House of Representatives
Preceded by Albert G. Talbott	Member of the U.S. House of Representatives from Kentucky's 4th congressional district March 4, 1859 – March 3, 1861	Succeeded by Aaron Harding
