= Margaret Anderson Watts =

American social reformer, writer and clubwoman

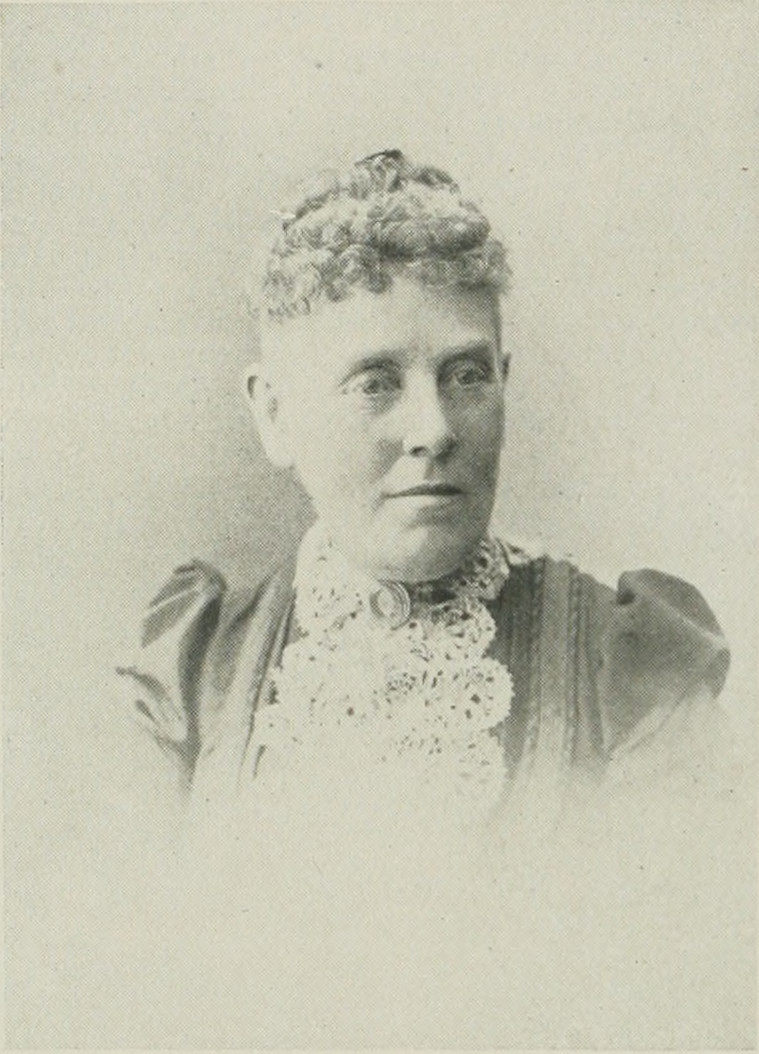
- Portrait photo from A Woman of the Century
- Born: Margaret Mills Anderson; September 3, 1832 near Danville, Kentucky, U.S.
- Died: April 30, 1905 (aged 72); Portsmouth, New Hampshire, U.S.
- Resting place: Bellevue Cemetery, Danville, Kentucky
- Education: Massachusetts Metaphysical College
- Occupations: social reformer; writer; clubwoman
- Spouse: Robert Augustine Watts (m. 1851; died 1896)
- Children: 3
- Parent: Simeon H. Anderson
- Relatives: William Owsley; Albert G. Talbott; Bryan Owsley
- Writing career
- Movement: Women's Rights Movement of the late nineteenth-early twentieth centuries

Margaret Anderson Watts (née Anderson; September 3, 1832 – April 30, 1905) was an American social reformer in the temperance movement, writer, and clubwoman. She was a deep thinker on the most advanced social and religious topics of her day, and occasionally published her views on women in her political and civil relations. She was the first Kentucky woman who wrote and advocated the equal rights of women before the law, and who argued for the higher education of women. She served as president of the Woman's Christian Temperance Union (WCTU) of Kentucky, and as the National WCTU's Superintendent of police matrons.

== Early life and education ==
Margaret Mills Anderson was born in a country place near Danville, Kentucky, September 3, 1832. She was the daughter and sixth child of Hon. Simeon H. Anderson, a lawyer and orator, who died while he was a member of the U.S. House of Representatives in Washington, D.C. Her brother, William Clayton Anderson, also served as a U.S. Representative from Kentucky. Albert G. Talbott was her uncle. On the maternal side, she is a granddaughter of Judge William Owsley, who was the fourteenth Governor of Kentucky. William was a first cousin to U.S. Representative Bryan Owsley. Her ancestors went back to the Rev. John Owsley (1635–1687), who in 1660 was made rector of the Established Church in Glouston, England, in which place he served sixty years. His son, Thomas Owsley, came to the Colony of Virginia, in America, in 1694, and settled in Fairfax County, Virginia. From his line came Amelia G. Owsley, the mother of Mrs. Watts. Both the Owsleys and Andersons were talented, educated people.

Ample means gave her fine educational advantages, her studies including classical learning and all the events of the era.

== Career ==
During the revision of the constitution of Kentucky towards the end of the 19th century, she was chosen one of six women to visit the capital and secure a hearing before the committees on education and municipalities, and on the Woman's Property Rights Bill, which was under discussion.

She was a successful adult Bible-class teacher. She said that she regarded the Bible as "the Magna Carta of a true Republic".

She felt a strong interest in the Chautauqua movement instituted by Rev. John H. Vincent. In the second year of that movement, she became a student of the Chautauqua Literary and Scientific Circle. She understood the Chautauqua idea and formed several successful circles in her own State.

When the Women's Crusade movement was initiated, Watts was living in Colorado, where business affairs called her husband for several years, but her sympathies were with the women of Ohio and with those who formed the WCTU, which she joined as soon as she returned to Louisville, Kentucky. She worked actively in various departments of that organization, but her special work was given to scientific temperance instruction in the public schools. Her work attracted a lot of attention and resulted in extensive positive good. She served as the WCTU's national superintendent of police matrons. She represented the National WCTU as one of its delegates to the National Council of Women of the United States meeting in Nashville, Tennessee, October 1897.

In the autumn of 1875 she, in connection with other women of the Woman's Christian Association of Louisville, established a Home for Friendless Women. She was the first secretary of the board of managers and its president for eight years. The work was begun with a few thousand dollars and was sustained and carried on by gratuitous contributions from the people of the city. Hundreds of women slept beneath its roof after its doors were opened. A new and spacious building was erected in the early 1890s.

In the fall of 1887, Watts gave a course of lectures, treating women from a standpoint of culture, affection, industry and philanthropy, before the Woman's Ethical Symposium of Louisville.

Watts was a member of National Society of the Colonial Dames of America. An elected officer of the John Marshall Chapter, Daughters of the American Revolution, she served as its historian in 1902.

== Personal life ==
Watts made her home in Louisville.

She married Robert Augustine Watts (1823–1896) in 1851. Three children grew to maturity. The oldest daughter, Julia, was the wife of Commander William W. Mead, of the United States Navy; the second daughter was the wife of a Florida orange-grower; and the son, Robert, was a successful engineer.

She was a life-long member of the Presbyterian church. In her later years, she studied metaphysics and scientific subjects, and she was a member of the Massachusetts Metaphysical College of Boston, Massachusetts. Her Christian Science professional card, styled "Margaret Anderson Watts, C.S.B.", (Note: The designation, C.S.B., signifies “Bachelor of Christian Science".) was inserted in The Christian Science Journal, 1889.

Margaret Anderson Watts died April 30, 1905, at the home of her daughter, Julia Mead, in Portsmouth, New Hampshire. Burial was at Bellevue Cemetery, Danville, Kentucky.
