= John Y. Brown (politician, born 1835) =

American politician (1835–1904)

John Brown
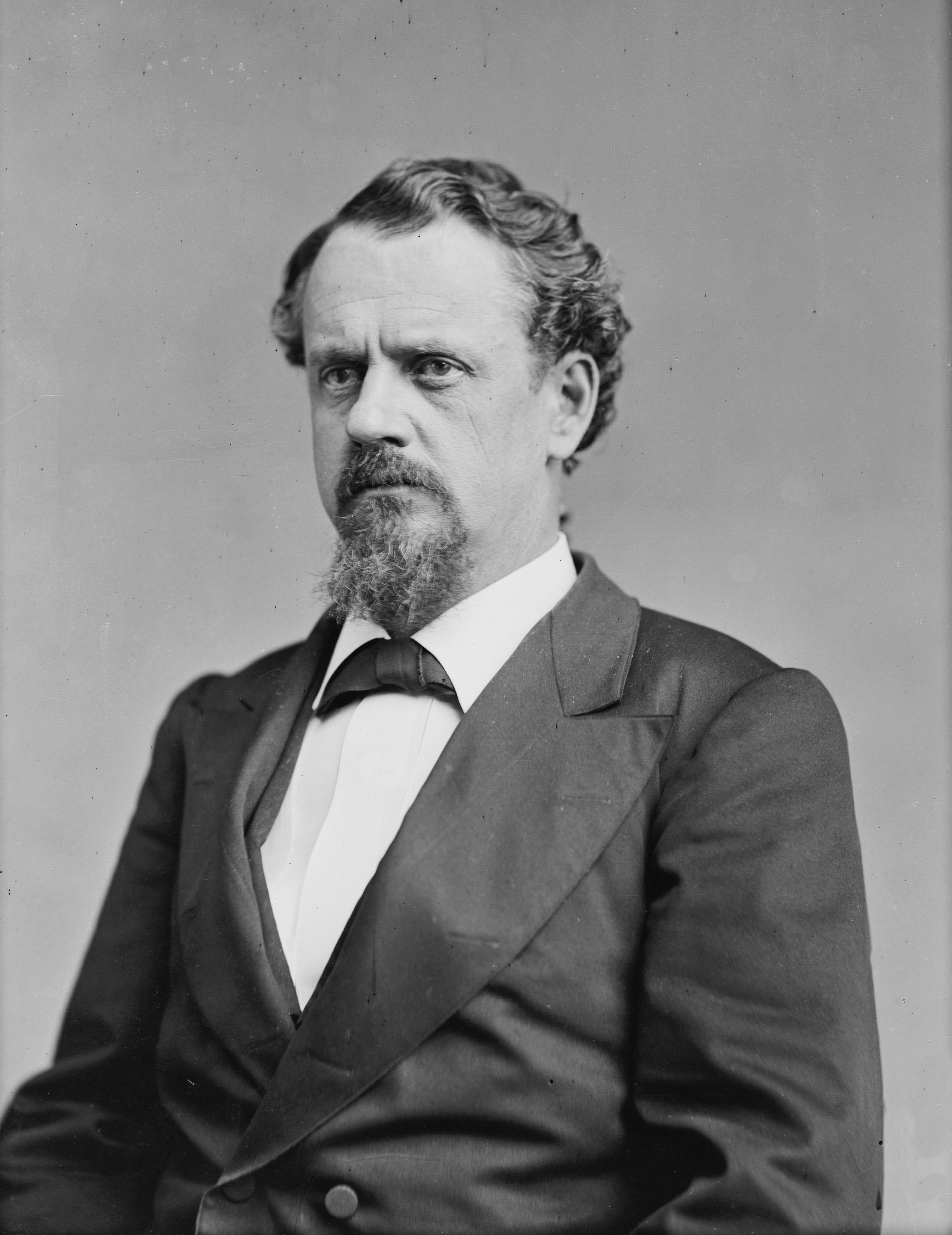

31st Governor of Kentucky
- In office September 2, 1891 – December 10, 1895
- Lieutenant: Mitchell Alford
- Preceded by: Simon Bolivar Buckner
- Succeeded by: William Bradley

Member of the U.S. House of Representatives from Kentucky's 2nd district
- In office March 4, 1873 – March 3, 1877
- Preceded by: Henry D. McHenry
- Succeeded by: James A. McKenzie

Member of the U.S. House of Representatives from Kentucky's 5th district
- In office December 3, 1860 – March 3, 1861
- Preceded by: Joshua Jewett
- Succeeded by: Charles Wickliffe

Personal details
- Born: John Young Brown; June 28, 1835 Claysville, Kentucky, U.S.
- Died: January 11, 1904 (aged 68) Henderson, Kentucky, U.S.
- Party: Democratic
- Spouse(s): Lucie Barbee; Rebecca Hart Dixon
- Relatives: Bryan Rust Young (uncle); William Singleton Young (uncle)
- Education: Centre College (BA)

John Young Brown (June 28, 1835 – January 11, 1904) was an American politician from the U.S. Commonwealth of Kentucky who represented the state in the United States House of Representatives and served as its 31st governor of Kentucky. Brown was elected to the House of Representatives for three non-consecutive terms, each of which was marred by controversy. He was first elected in 1859, despite his own protests that he was not yet twenty-five years old, the minimum age set by the Constitution for serving in the legislature. The voters of his district elected him anyway, but he was not allowed to take his seat until the Congress' second session, after he was of legal age to serve. After moving to Henderson, Kentucky, Brown was elected from that district in 1866. On this occasion, he was denied his seat because of alleged disloyalty to the Union during the Civil War. Voters in his district refused to elect another representative, and the seat remained vacant throughout the term to which Brown was elected. After an unsuccessful gubernatorial bid in 1871, Brown was again elected to the House in 1872 and served three consecutive terms. During his final term, he was officially censured for delivering a speech excoriating Massachusetts Representative Benjamin F. Butler. The censure was later expunged from the congressional record.

After his service in the House, Brown took a break from politics but re-entered the political arena as a candidate for governor of Kentucky in 1891. He secured the Democratic nomination in a four-way primary election, then convincingly won the general election over his Republican challenger, Andrew T. Wood. Brown's administration, and the state Democratic Party, were split between gold standard supporters (including Brown) and supporters of the free coinage of silver. Brown's was also the first administration to operate under the Kentucky Constitution of 1891, and most of the legislature's time was spent adapting the state's code of laws to the new constitution. Consequently, little of significance was accomplished during Brown's term.

Brown hoped the legislature would elect him to the U.S. Senate following his term as governor. Having already alienated the free silver faction of his party, he backed "Goldbug" candidate Cassius M. Clay Jr. for the Democratic nomination in the upcoming gubernatorial election. However, the deaths of two of Brown's children ended his interest in the gubernatorial race and his own senatorial ambitions. At the Democratic nominating convention of 1899, candidate William Goebel used questionable tactics to secure the gubernatorial nomination, and a disgruntled faction of the party held a separate nominating convention, choosing Brown to oppose Goebel in the general election. Goebel was eventually declared the winner of the election, but was assassinated. Brown became the legal counsel for former Kentucky Secretary of State Caleb Powers, an accused conspirator in the assassination. Brown died in Henderson on January 11, 1904.

== Early life ==
John Young Brown was born on June 27, 1835, in Claysville (near Elizabethtown), Hardin County, Kentucky. He was the son of Thomas Dudley and Elizabeth (Young) Brown. His father served in the state legislature and was a delegate to the 1849 state constitutional convention. Two of his uncles, Bryan Rust Young and William Singleton Young, served as U.S. Representatives. Brown spent much time with his father at the state capitol, which sparked his early interest in politics.

Brown received his early education in the schools of Elizabethtown, and in 1851, at the age of sixteen, matriculated at Centre College in Danville, Kentucky. In 1855, he graduated from Centre and returned to Hardin County to read law. He was admitted to the bar in 1857 and opened his practice in Elizabethtown. His reputation as an orator put him in high demand, but his zealous criticism of the Know Nothing Party drew threats against his life.

Brown married Lucie Barbee in 1857, but she died the following year. In September 1860, he married Rebecca Hart Dixon, the daughter of former U.S. Senator Archibald Dixon. The couple had eight children.

== U.S. House of Representatives ==
At a meeting of local Democrats in Bardstown, Kentucky, in 1859, Brown was nominated to oppose Joshua Jewett for Jewett's seat in the House of Representatives. Despite Brown's protests that he was more than a year younger than the legal age to serve, he was elected over Jewett by about two thousand votes. He did not take his seat until the second congressional session because of his age. He became a member of the Douglas National Committee in 1860 and engaged in a series of debates with supporters of John C. Breckinridge for president, including Breckinridge's cousin, William Campbell Preston Breckinridge.

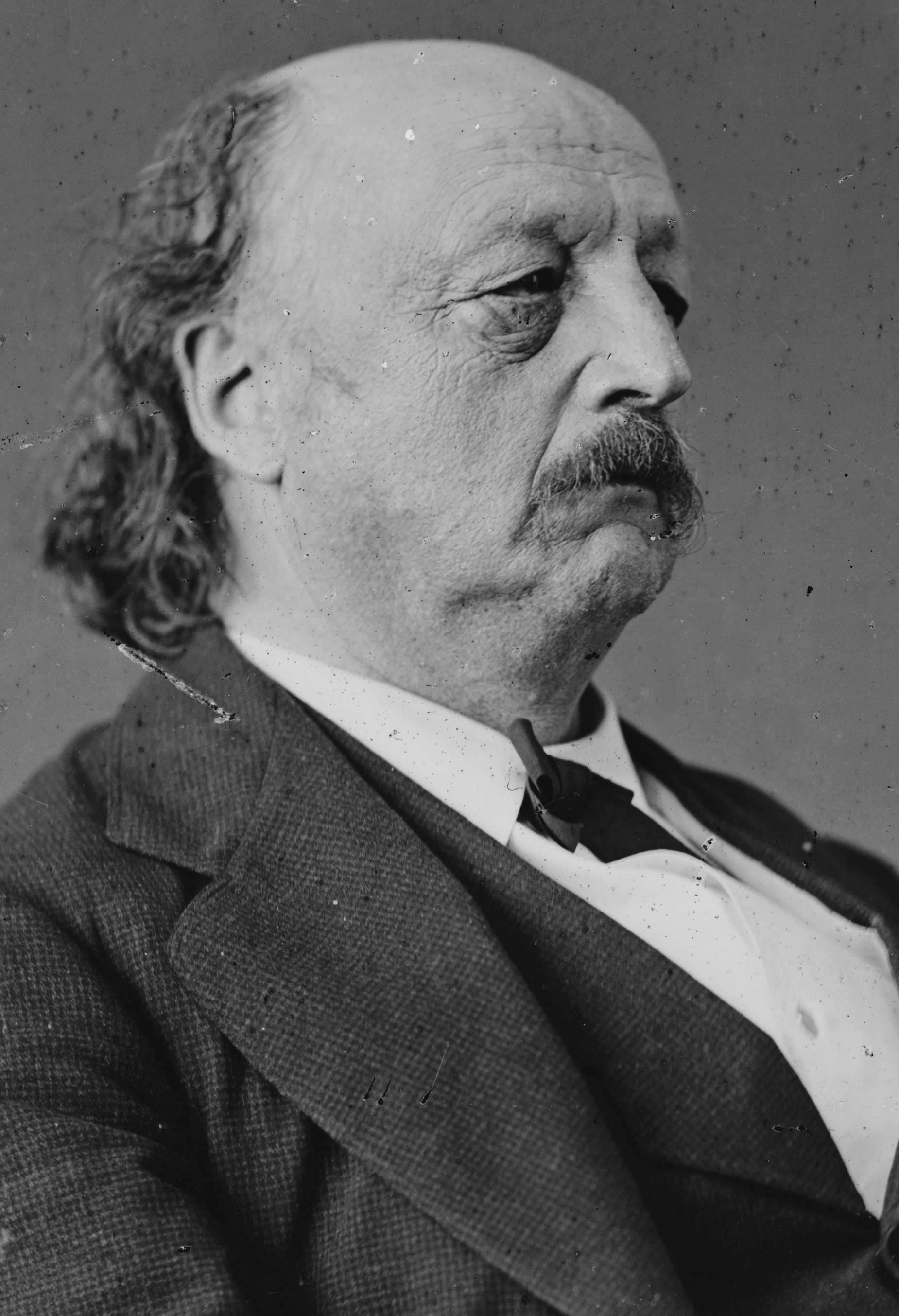
Benjamin F. Butler; Brown's excoriation of him drew an official censure from the House of Representatives

It is not clear exactly when Brown relocated to Henderson, Kentucky. Confederate officer Stovepipe Johnson recounts that Brown was among the city leaders who welcomed him to Henderson in early 1862, but other sources state that Brown did not settle in Henderson until after the war. His sympathies during the war were decidedly with the Confederacy.^{[a]}

Brown was re-elected to the House of Representatives in 1866. His seat was declared vacant, however, because of his alleged disloyalty during the war. Voters in his district refused to elect anyone else to fill the vacancy, and Governor John W. Stevenson filed an official protest of the House's action, but the seat remained unfilled throughout the Fortieth Congress.

Governor Stevenson resigned his office to accept a seat in the U.S. Senate, and the remainder of his term was filled by President Pro Tem of the Senate Preston Leslie. When Leslie, who enjoyed only lukewarm support from his party, sought the Democratic gubernatorial nomination in 1871, Brown's name was among those put in nomination against his; after a few ballots, however, it became clear that Brown would not be able to gain a majority, and his supporters abandoned their support of him in favor of other candidates. The following year, Brown was re-elected to the House of Representatives by an overwhelming vote of 10,888 to 457 and was allowed to assume his seat. He was twice re-elected, serving until 1877.

Brown's most notable action in the House was a speech he made on February 4, 1875, in response to Massachusetts Representative Benjamin F. Butler's call to pass the Civil Rights Act of 1875. Referring to comments Butler had made the previous day about lawlessness against African-Americans in the South, Brown claimed that unjust charges had been made against Southerners by an individual "who is outlawed in his own home by respectable society, whose name is synonymous with falsehood, who is the champion, and has been on all occasions, of fraud; who is the apologist of thieves, who is such a prodigy of vice and meanness that to describe him would sicken the imagination and exhaust invective." Brown continued by referencing notorious Scottish murderer William Burke, whose method of murdering his victims became known as "Burking." At this point in the speech, Speaker of the House James G. Blaine interrupted Brown, asking if he was referring to a member of the House; Brown gave an ambiguous response before continuing: "If I wished to describe all that was pusillanimous in war, inhuman in peace, forbidden in morals, and infamous in politics, I should call it 'Butlerizing'." The House gallery exploded in protest at Brown's remark, and incensed Republican legislators called for Brown's immediate expulsion. Though not expelled, he was officially censured by the House for the use of unparliamentary language. The censure was expunged from the record by a subsequent Congress.

== 1891 gubernatorial election ==
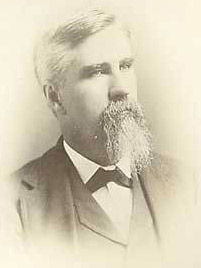
Cassius M. Clay Jr., Brown's closest competitor for the 1891 Democratic gubernatorial nomination

Following his service in the House, Brown resumed his law practice in Louisville, Kentucky. In 1891, he was a candidate for the Democratic gubernatorial nomination. The other candidates included Cassius Marcellus Clay Jr., son of former Congressman Brutus J. Clay and nephew of abolitionist Cassius Marcellus Clay; Dr. John Daniel Clardy, later to be elected a U.S. Representative; and Attorney General Parker Watkins Hardin. The party was split between supporters of corporations, such as the Louisville and Nashville Railroad, and supporters of agrarian interests. Another split was between the more conservative Bourbon Democrats, who supported maintaining the gold standard, and more progressive Democrats, who called for the free coinage of silver. Agrarian voters were about equally split between Clay and Clardy, while Free Silver Democrats were about equally split between Hardin and Clardy. Having lived in the agrarian western part of the state for most of his life, and never having alienated the powerful Farmers' Alliance, Brown was acceptable to most agrarian interests, while the Louisville and Nashville Railroad felt he was a moderate on the issue of corporate regulation. Bourbon Democrats were also pleased with his sound money stand.

Entering the Democratic nominating convention, Brown seemed to be the favorite for the nomination. On the first ballot, he garnered the most votes (275), leading Clay (264), Clardy (190), and Hardin (186). Over the next nine ballots, the vote counts changed little. Finally, the convention chairman announced that the candidate receiving the fewest votes on the next ballot would be dropped from the voting. Clardy received the fewest votes, and on the next ballot, his supporters divided almost equally between the remaining three candidates. Hardin was the next candidate to be dropped, and Brown received a majority over Clay on the thirteenth ballot.

The Republicans nominated Andrew T. Wood, a lawyer from Mount Sterling, who had failed in earlier elections for Congress and state attorney general. Concurrently with the gubernatorial election, the state's voters would decide whether to ratify a proposed new constitution for the state in 1891. The divided Democrats had taken no stand on the document as part of their convention's platform, and Wood spent much of the campaign trying to get Brown to declare his support for or opposition to it. About six weeks before the election, Brown, sensing strong public support for the new constitution, finally came out in favor of it. For the remainder of the race, Wood touted an alleged conspiracy between Brown and the Louisville and Nashville Railroad to thwart meaningful corporate regulations, but the issue failed to gain much traction.

Both Democrats and Republicans were concerned about the presence of S. Brewer Erwin, nominee of the newly formed Populist Party, in the race; he enjoyed strong support for a third-party candidate, despite the fact that many believed his party's platform was too radical. Democrats, who were used to carrying the agrarian vote by a wide margin, were especially concerned that the Farmers' Alliance, consisting of over 125,000 members in Kentucky, would endorse Erwin. This did not occur, however, and in the general election, Brown defeated Wood by a vote of 144,168 to 116,087. Though he won the election, Brown had not won a majority of the votes; Populist Erwin captured 25,631 votes – 9 percent of the total cast – and a Prohibition candidate received 3,292 votes.

== Governor of Kentucky ==
Turmoil marked the legislative sessions of Brown's term; his supporters had been either unwilling or unable to influence the rest of the Democratic slate, and tensions over the currency issue soon split the administration. Attorney General William Jackson Hendricks, Treasurer Henry S. Hale, and Auditor Luke C. Norman were all free silver supporters and feuded with Brown and his (appointed) secretary of state, John W. Headley, throughout Brown's term. Over time, the rift deepened and spread to the entire Democratic party. Brown also frequently clashed with the legislature and vetoed several of the bills it passed; none of his vetoes were ever overridden.

When the General Assembly convened on the last day of 1891, Brown reported that he had appointed a commission to study the impact of the new constitution on the state's existing laws. He also announced that the state's present budget deficit was $229,000 and was expected to reach almost half a million dollars by the end of 1893. With these two large issues facing it, the Assembly was in session almost continuously from December 1891 to July 1893. The length of the session earned it a derisive nickname – the "Long Parliament". Part of the reason for the extended session was each chamber's difficulty in achieving a quorum; a Louisville newspaper reported that, for an entire month, the largest attendance in the House of Representatives was 61 of 100 members. Consequently, some bills were passed by a plurality instead of a majority of the legislators. Fearing that these bills would be challenged in court, Brown vetoed them.

During the session, Brown secured the termination of a statewide geological survey, deeming it too expensive. By constitutional mandate, the regular session ended August 16, but Brown convened a special session of the legislature on August 25 because important bills that he had vetoed needed to be rewritten and passed, and because some bills he had signed needed to be amended to comply with the new constitution. Major legislation advocated by Brown and passed by the General Assembly included improvements in tax collection processes and tighter controls on corporations. Among the measures not specifically advocated by Brown that were enacted by the General Assembly was a measure racially segregating the state's railroad cars, called the "separate coach law". The special session lasted until November 1.

Brown won acclaim from the railroad companies for vetoing a proposed railroad tax increase, but soon drew their ire for preventing the merger of the state's two largest railways, the Louisville and Nashville Railroad and the Chesapeake and Ohio Railway. The Mason and Foard Company, which leased convict labor to build railroads, resented Brown's prison reforms. Brown accused his predecessor, Simon Bolivar Buckner, of illegally allowing Mason and Foard to use convict labor, a charge Buckner vehemently denied.

During the 1894 legislative session, Brown advocated and won passage of several government efficiency measures, including a bill to transfer certain state governmental expenses to the counties, a bill to reform state printing contracts, and measures clarifying laws governing asylums and charitable institutions. The most significant bill, and the one that generated the most debate, was a law giving married women individual property rights for the first time in state history. Other measures passed during the session included a basic coal safety measure, a common school statute, a measure prohibiting collusive bidding on tobacco, new regulations on grain warehouses, and a law providing free turnpikes. Measures advocated by Brown but not enacted by the Assembly included broadening the powers of the state railroad commission, establishing the offices of state bank inspector and superintendent of public printing, and reforming prison management, including separate detention of adolescent criminals. Brown also lobbied for the abolition of the state parole board; when the Assembly refused, Brown vowed to ignore the board's recommendations.

Mob violence was prevalent in Kentucky during Brown's tenure as governor. From 1892 to 1895, there were fifty-six lynchings in the state. During one notable incident, a Cincinnati judge refused to extradite a black man suspected of shooting a white man in Kentucky. The judge's decision was based on his opinion that the accused was likely to be the victim of mob violence if returned to Kentucky. In disputing the judge's decision, Governor Brown attempted to justify some of the violence that had occurred in the state's past, declaring "It is much to be regretted that we have occasionally had mob violence in this Commonwealth, but it has always been when the passions of the people have been inflamed by the commission of the most atrocious crimes."

== Later life and death ==
It was widely known that Brown desired election to the U.S. Senate when his gubernatorial term expired in 1896. The leading Democratic candidates to succeed Brown as governor were his old rivals, Cassius M. Clay Jr. and Parker Watkins Hardin, and Brown believed he would need his eventual successor's support to secure the Senate seat. Having already alienated Hardin and his free silver allies, Brown threw his support to Clay. Family tragedy would soon remove his interest in the race, however. On October 30, 1894, Brown's teenage daughter Susan died of tuberculosis. A few months later, his son, Archibald Dixon Brown, divorced his wife; it was subsequently discovered that he had been carrying on an extramarital affair. Acting on an anonymous tip, his lover's husband found the couple at a brothel in Louisville; drawing his pistol, he shot his wife and Archibald Brown, killing them both. Of the series of family tragedies, Governor Brown wrote to Clay, "I shall not be a candidate for the Senate. The calamities of my children, which have recently befallen, have utterly unfitted me for the contest. My grief is so severe that, like a black vampire of the night, it seems to have sucked dry the very arteries and veins of my ambition." Clay went on to lose the nomination to Hardin. Brown refused to endorse Hardin, and the fractured Democratic party watched as the Republicans elected William O. Bradley, the party's first-ever governor of Kentucky. Despite Brown's proclaimed lack of interest in the Senate seat, he received one vote during the tumultuous 1896 Senate election to replace Senator J. C. S. Blackburn.

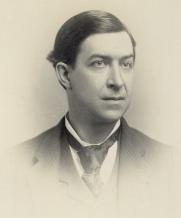
William Goebel's nomination drew Brown into the 1899 gubernatorial race.

After his term as governor, Brown again returned to his legal practice in Louisville. He was an unsuccessful candidate for the House of Representatives in 1896, losing to Republican Walter Evans. He would later claim that he had only run in order to improve Democratic voter turnout for William Jennings Bryan's 1896 presidential bid. Prior to the 1899 Democratic nominating convention, Brown was mentioned as a possible gubernatorial nominee, but he declined to become a candidate. When the convention began, he was mentioned as a candidate for convention chairman, but he also refused to serve in this capacity.

Despite his proclaimed lack of interest in the gubernatorial nomination, Brown's name was entered as a candidate on the first ballot, along with Parker Watkins Hardin, former Congressman William J. Stone, and William Goebel, President Pro Tempore of the state senate. The convention was thrown into chaos when a widely known agreement between Stone and Goebel – designed to get Hardin out of the race – broke down. As balloting continued over the next four days (Sunday excepted) with no candidate receiving a majority, Brown continued to receive a few votes on each ballot. Finally, the convention delegates decided to drop the candidate with the lowest vote total until one candidate received a majority; this resulted in the nomination of Goebel a few ballots later.

Following the convention, disgruntled Democrats began to talk about rejecting their party's nominee and holding another nominating convention. Brown became the leader of this group, styled the "Honest Election League". Plans for the new convention were made at a meeting held August 2, 1899, in Lexington, Kentucky. The nomination was made official at a convention held in that city on August 16. In addition to Brown, the Honest Election League nominated a full slate of candidates for the other state offices.

Brown opened his campaign with a speech at Bowling Green on August 26, 1899. He answered many allegations that had been made about him, including claims that he had secretly been seeking the Democratic gubernatorial nomination all along, that he had ambitions of succeeding Senator William Joseph Deboe, and that following the nominating convention, he had agreed to speak on behalf of the Goebel ticket. Brown conceded that he desired Senator Deboe's senate seat and that he had agreed to accept the gubernatorial nomination if it had been offered to him, but he denied that he had ever agreed to speak on Goebel's behalf. Outgoing Senator Blackburn also charged that Brown was bolting the party again, just as he had in supporting Stephen Douglas over John C. Breckinridge for president in 1860. Brown replied by quoting an article by William Jennings Bryan's Omaha World-Herald that asserted the right of an individual to vote against the nominee of his party if the individual deemed the nominee unfit.

Due to his age and ill health, Brown was able to speak only once per week. At a campaign event in Madisonville, he challenged Goebel to a debate, but Goebel ignored the challenge. Brown, and other speakers enlisted on behalf of his campaign, frequently called attention to Goebel's refusal to acknowledge the challenge or agree to a debate. When William Jennings Bryan came to the state to campaign with Goebel, Brown sent him a letter challenging him to repudiate Goebel's nomination because of the broken agreement between Goebel and Stone. Bryan refused to comment on the events of the convention and stressed the importance of party loyalty. He denounced the Honest Election League's convention as irregular and invalid.

Brown's campaign faltered as the race drew to a close. Two weeks prior to the election, Brown was injured in a fall at Leitchfield; as a result of the injury, he was confined to his home and unable to deliver campaign speeches, despite several attempts to allow him to speak from a chair or wheelchair. The final vote count gave Republican William S. Taylor a small plurality with 193,714 votes to Goebel's 191,331; Brown garnered only 12,140 votes.

Goebel challenged the vote returns in several counties. While the challenges were being adjudicated, Goebel was shot by an unknown assassin; Goebel was ultimately declared the winner of the election, but died of his wounds two days after being sworn into office. Among those charged in Goebel's murder was Governor Taylor's Secretary of State, Caleb Powers. Powers employed Brown as his legal counsel during his first trial, which ended in a conviction in July 1900. Brown died January 11, 1904, in Henderson and was buried at the Fernwood Cemetery in that city. He was the namesake of, but not related to, 20th century Kentucky Congressman John Y. Brown Sr.

== See also ==
- List of United States representatives expelled, censured, or reprimanded

== Notes ==
- ^[a] The National Governors Association web site claims Brown served as a cavalry colonel during the war, but provides no elaboration. Neither Brown's contemporaries (Levin, Johnson, Hughes, etc.) nor later historians (Clark, Harrison, Ireland, etc.) mention this service.

U.S. House of Representatives
| Preceded by Joshua Jewett | Member of the U.S. House of Representatives from Kentucky's 5th congressional district 1859–1861 | Succeeded by Charles Wickliffe |
| Preceded by Henry D. McHenry | Member of the U.S. House of Representatives from Kentucky's 2nd congressional district 1873–1877 | Succeeded by James A. McKenzie |
Party political offices
| Preceded by Simon Buckner | Democratic nominee for Governor of Kentucky; 1891 | Succeeded by Parker Watkins Hardin |
Political offices
| Preceded by Simon Buckner | Governor of Kentucky; 1891–1895 | Succeeded by William Bradley |
