= Simeon H. Anderson =

American politician

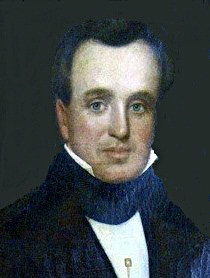

Member of the U.S. House of Representatives from Kentucky's 5th district
- In office March 4, 1839 – August 11, 1840
- Preceded by: James Harlan
- Succeeded by: John Burton Thompson

Member of the Kentucky House of Representatives
- In office 1828-29, 1832, 1836-38

Personal details
- Born: March 2, 1802 Lancaster, Kentucky, US
- Died: August 11, 1840 (aged 38) Lancaster, Kentucky, US
- Party: Whig
- Children: William Clayton Anderson; Margaret Anderson Watts
- Profession: Politician, Lawyer

Simeon H. Anderson (March 2, 1802 – August 11, 1840) was an American politician and slave owner who was a United States representative from Kentucky from 1839 to 1840.

== Life ==
He was born near Lancaster, Kentucky, where he pursued preparatory studies. In addition, he studied law and was admitted to the bar in 1823 and commenced practice in Lancaster, Kentucky.

Anderson was a member of the Kentucky House of Representatives 1828, 1829, 1832, and 1836–1838. He was elected as a Whig to the Twenty-sixth Congress and served from March 4, 1839, until his death near Lancaster, Kentucky, in 1840. He was buried in the Anderson family cemetery, with a cenotaph at the Congressional Cemetery.

Anderson was the father of William Clayton Anderson who also served as a Representative from Kentucky, and Margaret Anderson Watts, social reformer.

== See also ==
- List of members of the United States Congress who died in office (1790–1899)

U.S. House of Representatives
Preceded by James Harlan	Member of the U.S. House of Representatives from Kentucky's 5th congressional district March 4, 1839 – August 11, 1840	Succeeded by John B. Thompson
