= John Burton Thompson =

American politician

John B. Thompson
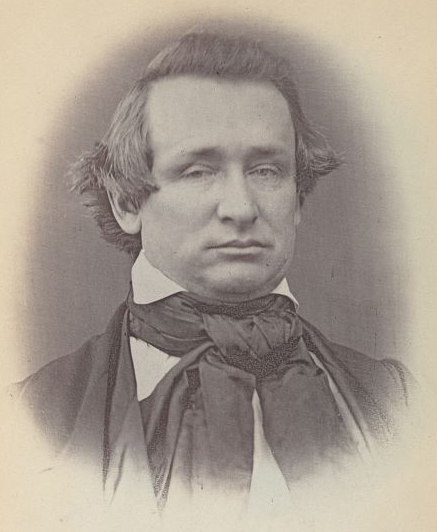

United States Senator from Kentucky
- In office March 4, 1853 – March 3, 1859
- Preceded by: Joseph R. Underwood
- Succeeded by: Lazarus W. Powell

15th Lieutenant Governor of Kentucky
- In office September 2, 1851 – 1853
- Governor: Lazarus W. Powell
- Preceded by: John L. Helm
- Succeeded by: James Greene Hardy

Member of the U.S. House of Representatives from Kentucky's 5th district
- In office December 7, 1840 – March 3, 1843
- Preceded by: Simeon H. Anderson
- Succeeded by: James W. Stone
- In office March 4, 1847 – March 3, 1851
- Preceded by: Bryan Young
- Succeeded by: James W. Stone

Member of the Kentucky House of Representatives
- In office 1835-1837

Member of the Kentucky Senate
- In office 1829–1833

Personal details
- Born: December 14, 1810 Harrodsburg, Kentucky, US
- Died: January 7, 1874 (aged 63) Harrodsburg, Kentucky, US
- Party: Whig, Know Nothing
- Relatives: Maria T. Daviess (sister) Philip B. Thompson Jr. (son)
- Profession: Politician, Lawyer

John Burton Thompson (December 14, 1810 – January 7, 1874) was an American politician who was a U.S. representative and Senator from Kentucky and the 15th lieutenant governor of Kentucky.

== Early life ==
Born near Harrodsburg, Kentucky, Thompson grew up in a pro-slavery household with parents who owned six slaves. When his father died in 1833, his mother became the enslaver. He continued his family's legacy of slave ownership throughout his political career.

After he completed his preparatory studies, he studied law. He was admitted to the bar in 1831. He practiced law in Harrodsburg and became the Commonwealth's Attorney.

== Political career ==
=== Kentucky Legislature ===
Thompson was elected to the Kentucky Senate in 1829 and served until 1833. In 1835, he was elected to the Kentucky House of Representatives where he served two 2-year terms.

=== House of Representatives ===
In 1840, he was elected as a Whig to the United States House of Representatives to fill the vacancy in Kentucky's 5th District caused by the death of Simeon H. Anderson. He was subsequently reelected in 1842 and served until March 3, 1843. After a time out of Congress, he was again elected to represent the same district, serving this time from March 4, 1847, to March 3, 1851. During this time he was chairman of the US House Committee on the Militia.

=== Lieutenant governor ===
He was the 14th Lieutenant Governor of Kentucky in 1852.

=== United States Senate ===
In 1852, he was elected to the United States Senate as a member of the Know-Nothing party. He served from March 4, 1853, to March 3, 1859.

=== Political views ===
Over time, his political views had changed. He had been a Clay Whig until the disruption of the party just before the US Civil War, when he became a Constitutional Unionist. In 1870, he accepted a nomination as President of the "Radical Congressional Convention".

== Personal life ==
=== Enslaving of African Americans ===
In 1840, Thompson was the enslaver of one female between 10 and 23 years of age. By 1850, he owned three enslaved people: a 21-year-old woman, a 12-year-old boy, and a 1-year-old girl.

On September 24, 1857, the Springfield Daily Republican published an article titled "Bogus Fugitives". The article stated that two men were "passing themselves off" for fugitive slaves. One of them was named George Thompson. George said that he was the slave of Senator Thompson of Kentucky and that he had been his body servant in Washington. The article is written to dissuade the public from believing this information and claims that George Thompson "is said to be very shrewd and adept at humbug."

In early February 1859, the Cleveland Herald published an article titled "What a Batch of Pies Cost a United States Senator." The article stated that two "passengers" came through on the "underground railroad train" from Kentucky. One was Senator Thompson's "boy", a mulatto of 18 to 20 years of age. The young man had put a batch of pies in the oven, leaving the door open because the oven was too hot. However, the door shut accidentally and the pies were burned. For this offense, he was threatened with a whipping in the morning. Instead, he and another enslaved man fled together before daylight. They made their way from Kentucky to Ohio on the underground railroad. The article speculated that the young man who fled the Thompson household was the biological son of Senator Thompson.

In 1860, Thompson was living in the same household as his mother. He was employed as a lawyer with real estate valued at $1,500 and a personal estate valued at $8,000. His mother Nancy's real estate was valued at $3,250 and her personal estate at $10,000. She was the enslaver of a 60-year-old male, a 35-year-old female, and an 18-year-old male. Thompson was not listed in the slave schedule for this year.

=== Marriage and death ===
Thompson remained a single man throughout his political career. On March 28, 1868, he married Mary Hardin (Chinn) Bowman in Harrodsberg, Mercer County, Kentucky. She was the widow of Dr. Benjamin Bowman. The couple did not have any children together.

Thompson died in Harrodsburg and was interred in Spring Hill Cemetery in Harrodsburg.

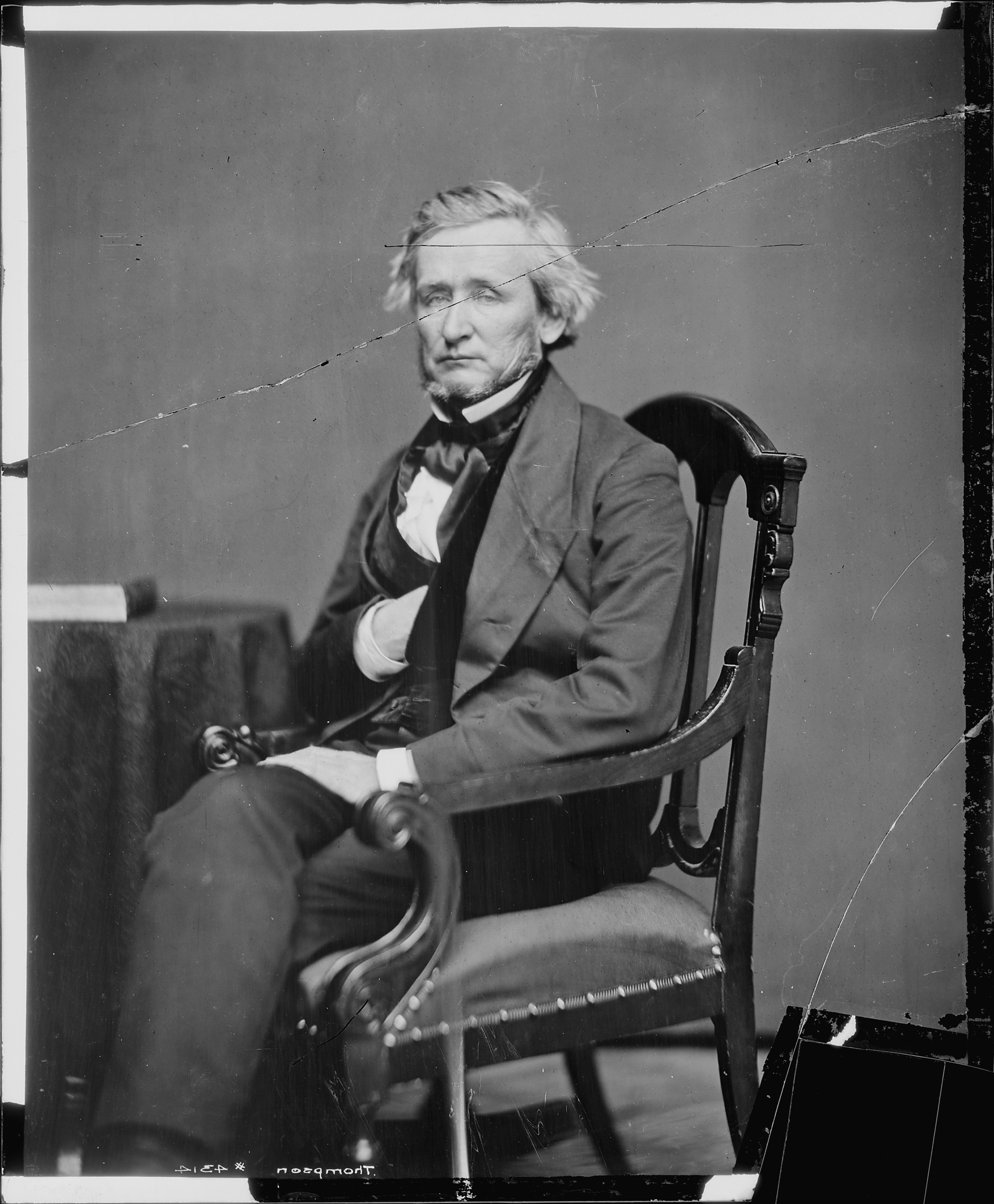
John B. Thompson, photograph by Mathew Brady

U.S. House of Representatives
Preceded by Simeon H. Anderson	Member of the U.S. House of Representatives from Kentucky's 5th congressional district December 7, 1840 – March 3, 1843	Succeeded by James W. Stone
Preceded by Bryan Rust Young	Member of the U.S. House of Representatives from Kentucky's 5th congressional district March 4, 1847 – March 3, 1851	Succeeded by James W. Stone
Political offices
Preceded by John L. Helm	Lieutenant Governor of Kentucky; 1852–1853	Succeeded by James Greene Hardy
U.S. Senate
Preceded by Joseph R. Underwood	U.S. senator (Class 2) from Kentucky; March 4, 1853 – March 3, 1859; Served alongside: Archibald Dixon, John J. Crittenden	Succeeded by Lazarus W. Powell
