= Joshua Jewett =

American politician (1815–1861)

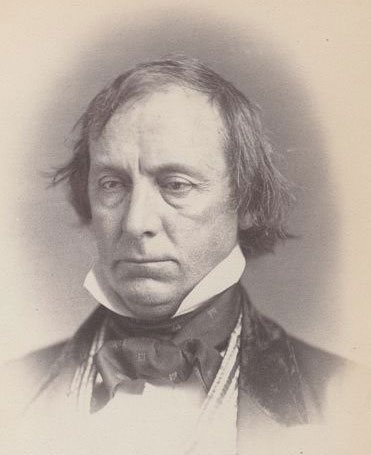

Member of the U.S. House of Representatives from Kentucky's 5th district
- In office March 4, 1855 – March 3, 1859
- Preceded by: Clement S. Hill
- Succeeded by: John Y. Brown

Personal details
- Born: September 30, 1815 Deer Creek, Maryland, U.S.
- Died: July 14, 1861 (aged 45) Elizabethtown, Kentucky, U.S.
- Party: Democratic
- Relations: Brother of Hugh Judge Jewett
- Profession: Lawyer
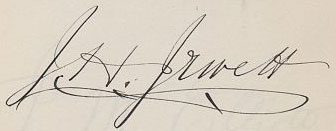
- Signature

Joshua Husband Jewett (September 30, 1815 – July 14, 1861) was a United States representative from Kentucky and the brother of Hugh Judge Jewett. He was born at Deer Creek, Maryland. He attended the common schools, studied law, and was admitted to the bar in 1836 commencing practice in Elizabethtown, Kentucky.

Jewett served as the prosecuting attorney of Hardin County, Kentucky. He was elected as a Democrat to the Thirty-fourth and Thirty-fifth Congresses (March 4, 1855 – March 3, 1859). While in Congress, he served as chairman, Committee on Expenditures in the Department of War (Thirty-fourth Congress), and as chairman, Committee on Invalid Pensions (Thirty-fifth Congress). He was an unsuccessful candidate for reelection in 1858 to the Thirty-sixth Congress. After leaving Congress, he resumed the practice of law. He died in Elizabethtown, Kentucky in 1861 and was buried in the City Cemetery

U.S. House of Representatives
Preceded by Clement S. Hill	Member of the U.S. House of Representatives from Kentucky's 5th congressional district March 4, 1855 – March 3, 1859	Succeeded by John Y. Brown
