= Albert G. Talbott =

American politician

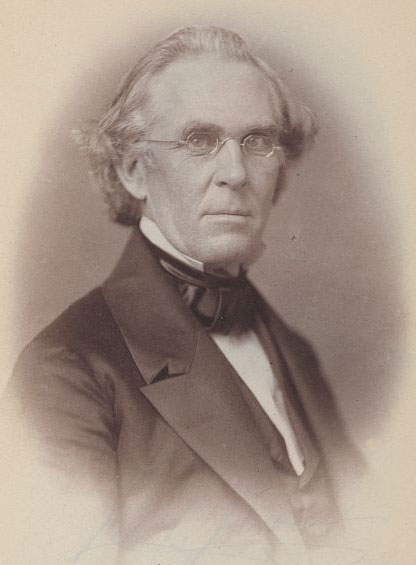

Member of the U.S. House of Representatives from Kentucky's 4th district
- In office March 4, 1855 – March 3, 1859
- Preceded by: James Chrisman
- Succeeded by: William Clayton Anderson

Member of the Kentucky House of Representatives
- In office 1850

Personal details
- Born: April 4, 1808 Bourbon County, Kentucky, U.S.
- Died: September 9, 1887 (aged 79) Philadelphia, Pennsylvania, U.S.
- Resting place: Bellevue Cemetery, Danville, Kentucky
- Party: Democratic
- Occupation: Farmer

Albert Gallatin Talbott (April 4, 1808 – September 9, 1887) was a United States representative from Kentucky. He was the uncle of William Clayton Anderson and Margaret Anderson Watts.

He was born near Paris, Kentucky and he moved with his parents to Clark County, Kentucky in 1813 and to Jessamine County, Kentucky in 1818. For education, he attended Forrest Hill Academy, Jessamine County, Kentucky and also studied law, but did not practice. He engaged in agricultural pursuits and general trading in 1831 before he moved to Mercer County, Kentucky in 1838 and engaged in the real estate business. He moved to Danville, Kentucky in 1846.

Talbott was a delegate to the Kentucky constitutional convention in 1849 and a member of the Kentucky House of Representatives in 1850. He was elected as a Democrat to the Thirty-fourth and Thirty-fifth Congresses (March 4, 1855 – March 3, 1859) and served as chairman, Committee on Expenditures in the Post Office Department (Thirty-fifth Congress). After leaving Congress, he resumed real estate pursuits. He served in the Kentucky Senate 1869–1873 and again a member of the Kentucky House of Representatives in 1883. Later, he moved to Pennsylvania and settled near Chestnut Hill, Pennsylvania and engaged in agricultural pursuits. He died in Philadelphia, Pennsylvania in 1887 and was buried in Bellevue Cemetery in Danville, Kentucky.

== Sources ==
- United States Congress. "Albert G. Talbott (id: T000020)". Biographical Directory of the United States Congress.

U.S. House of Representatives
Preceded by James Chrisman	Member of the U.S. House of Representatives from Kentucky's 4th congressional district March 4, 1855 – March 3, 1859	Succeeded by William C. Anderson
