= 1932 United States Senate election in Kentucky =

- November 6, 1932
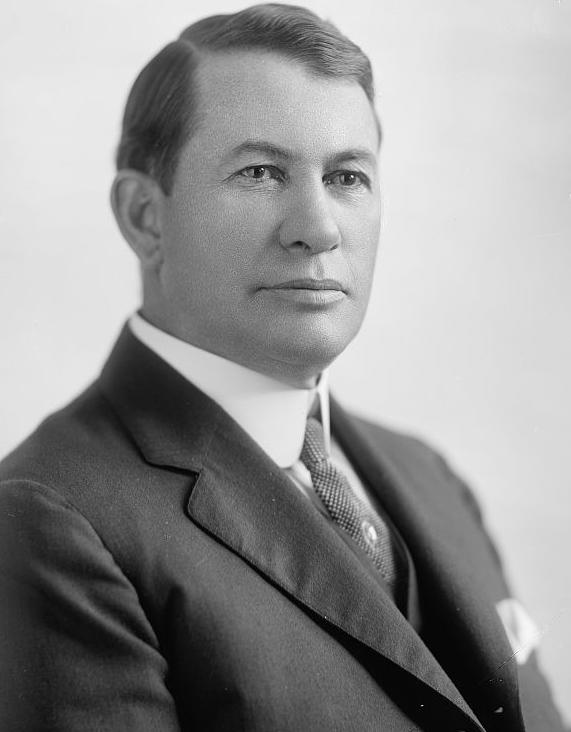

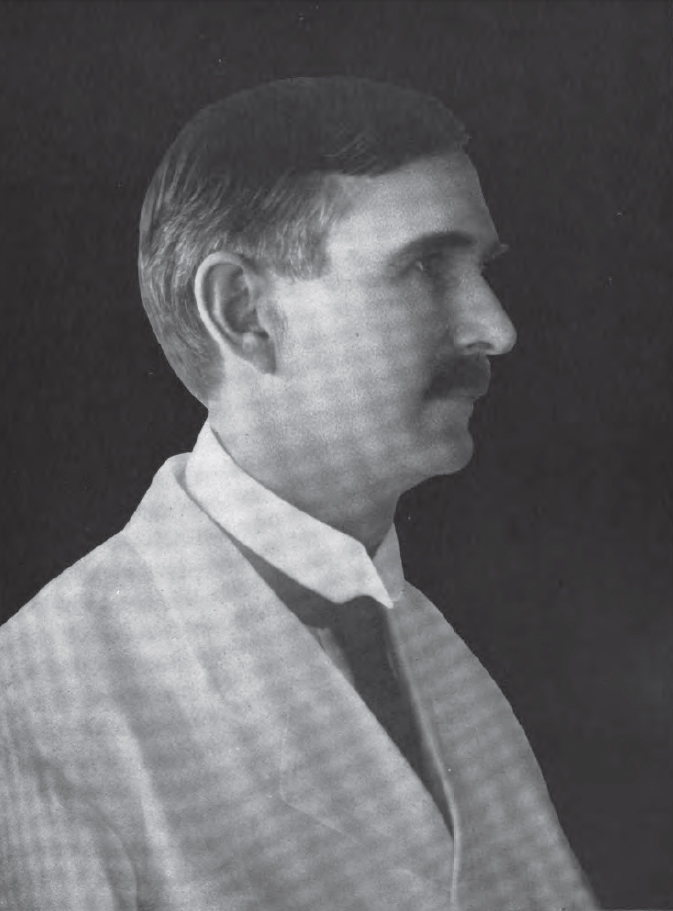
Nominee	Alben Barkley	Maurice H. Thatcher
Party	Democratic	Republican
Popular vote	575,077	393,865
Percentage	59.2%	40.5%
- County results Barkley: 50–60% 60–70% 70–80% 80–90% Haswell: 50–60% 60–70% 70–80% 80–90%
U.S. senator before election
Alben Barkley
Democratic
Elected U.S. Senator
Alben Barkley
Democratic

The 1932 United States Senate election in Kentucky took place on November 8, 1932. Democratic Senator and Senate Majority Leader Alben Barkley was re-elected to a second term in office over Republican Maurice H. Thatcher.

== Primary election ==
=== Democratic primary ===
==== Candidates ====
- Alben W. Barkley, incumbent U.S. Senator
- George B. Martin, former U.S. Senator (1918–1919)
- J. E. Wright

==== Results ====
Primary results by county Barkley: 40%–50%; 50%–60%; 60%–70%; 70%–80%; 80%–90%; 90%–100%; Martin: 40%–50%; 50%–60%; 60%–70%; 70%–80%; 80%–90%; Wright: 60%–70%

Democratic primary results
Party	Candidate	Votes	%
Democratic	Alben W. Barkley (incumbent)	124,775	66.58
Democratic	George B. Martin	55,556	29.64
Democratic	J. E. Wright	7,089	3.78
Total votes		187,420	100.00

== General election ==
=== Candidates ===
- Alben W. Barkley, incumbent Senator since 1927 (Democratic)
- W. E. Sandefur (Socialist)
- Maurice H. Thatcher, U.S. Representative from Louisville (Republican)

=== Results ===
1932 U.S. Senate election in Kentucky
Party	Candidate	Votes	%	±%
Democratic	Alben W. Barkley (incumbent)	575,077	59.15%	
Republican	Maurice H. Thatcher	393,865	40.51%	
Socialist	W. E. Sandefur	3,291	0.34%	
Majority		181,212	18.64%	
Total votes		972,233	100.00%	
Democratic hold				

== See also ==
- 1932 United States Senate elections

== Bibliography ==
- Congressional Elections, 1946-1996. Washington, D.C.: Congressional Quarterly Inc. 1998. ISBN 1-56802-248-4.
- Finch, Glenn (July 1971). "The Election of United States Senators in Kentucky: The Barkley Period". Filson Club History Quarterly. 45 (3).
- Harrison, Lowell H.; Klotter, James C. (1997). A New History of Kentucky. Lexington, Kentucky: The University Press of Kentucky. ISBN 0-8131-2008-X. Archived from the original on March 8, 2021.
- Jewell, Malcolm E. (1963). Kentucky Votes. Vol. 1. University of Kentucky Press.
- Klotter, James C. (1996). Kentucky: Portraits in Paradox, 1900–1950. Lexington, Kentucky: The University Press of Kentucky. ISBN 0-916968-24-3.
- Libbey, James K. (1979). Dear Alben: Mr. Barkley of Kentucky. Lexington, Kentucky: The University Press of Kentucky. ISBN 0-8131-0238-3. Archived from the original on December 2, 2021.
