= 1858–59 United States House of Representatives elections =

House elections for the 36th U.S. Congress

- June 7, 1858 – December 1, 1859 (Note: Regular elections, not specials)

All 238 seats in the United States House of Representatives 120 seats needed for a majority
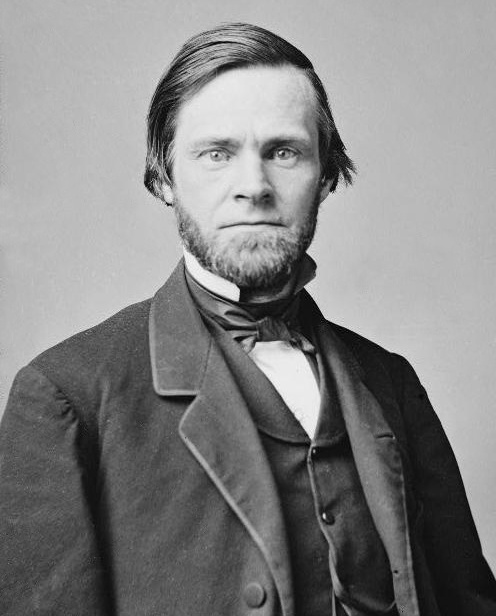

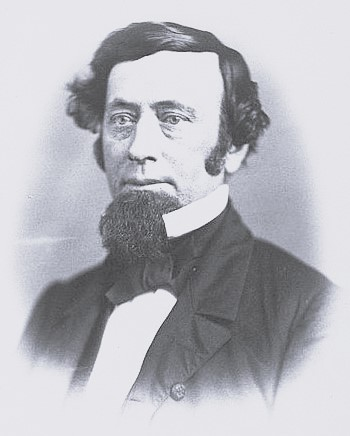
| | First party | Second party |
|---|---|---|
| Leader | John Sherman | Thomas Bocock |
| Party | Republican | Democratic |
| Leader's seat | Ohio 13th | Virginia 5th |
| Last election | 90 seats, 36.94% | 132 seats, 46.90% |
| Seats won | 113 | 83 (Note: Includes two elected as Lecompton Democrats.) |
| Seat change | ▲23 | ▼49 |
| Popular vote | 1,372,775 (Note: Includes 190,272 votes by candidates of the People's Party in Pennsylvania.) | 1,821,031 |
| Percentage | 36.30% | 48.15% |
| Swing | ▼0.64 pp | ▲1.25 pp |
| | Third party | Fourth party |
| Party | Opposition | Know Nothing |
| Last election | New party | 14 seats, 15.41% |
| Seats won | 19 (Note: Also known as the Whigs in North Carolina) | 5 |
| Seat change | ▲19 | ▼9 |
| Popular vote | 232,186 (Note: Includes 7,452 votes by a candidate of the People's Party in Delaware.) | 130,100 |
| Percentage | 6.14% | 3.44% |
| Swing | New Party (Note: There was only one Whig candidate during the 1856-1857 period, who earned twenty-three votes.) | ▼11.97 pp |
| | Fifth party |
| Party | Independent |
| Last election | 1 seat (Note: Included one Independent Democrat or "Benton" Democrat: Francis Preston Blair Jr. of Missouri.), 0.62% |
| Seats won | 15 (Note: Includes five Anti-Lecompton Democrats, seven Independent Democrats, and three Anti-Administration Democrats.) |
| Seat change | ▲14 |
| Popular vote | 257,342 (Note: Includes votes for those who ran labeled as an Independent, Union Democrat, Anti-Administration Democrat, Anti-Lecompton Democrat, and Independent Democrat.) |
| Percentage | 6.81% |
| Swing | ▲6.19 pp |
- Results; Democratic gain Democratic hold Republican gain Republican hold Independent gain Opposition gain Know Nothing hold
Speaker before election
James Orr
Democratic
Elected Speaker
William Pennington
Republican

States held the 1858–59 United States House of Representatives elections between June 7, 1858, and December 1, 1859, during President James Buchanan's term. Each state set a date for its elections to the House. Voters in 34 states, including the new state of Oregon and the pending new state of Kansas, elected 238 Representatives before the first session of the 36th United States Congress convened on December 5, 1859.

Winning a plurality for the first time, the Republicans benefited from multiple political factors. These included sectional strife in the Democratic Party, Northern voter anger with the Supreme Court's March 1857 Dred Scott decision, political exposure of Democrats to chaotic violence in Kansas amid repeated attempts to impose slavery against the express will of a majority of its settlers, and a plunge in President Buchanan's popularity due to his perceived fecklessness. In Pennsylvania, his home state, Republicans made particularly large gains.

The pivotal Dred Scott decision was only the second time the Supreme Court had overturned an Act of Congress on Constitutional grounds, after Marbury v. Madison. The decision created fear in the Northern United States, where slavery had ceased and was outlawed, that the Supreme Court would strike down limitations on slavery anywhere in the United States with a subsequent ruling in Lemmon v. New York.

An inflammatory antislavery manifesto entitled The Impending Crisis of the South had attracted attention during the previous session of Congress. The book's author, Hinton Rowan Helper, attacked the planter class as a tyrannical oligarchy and called on poor white Southerners to overthrow them, "peacefully if we can, violently if we must." The Republicans financed a special edition of Helper's book for mass circulation which was endorsed by 68 Republican members of Congress, including the Republican House leader John Sherman. Following the elections, Republicans were the largest party in the House but lacked an overall majority and were forced to rely on Southern Oppositionists to organize the chamber. These Southerners refused to vote for Sherman to become Speaker of the United States House of Representatives due to his association with The Impending Crisis. Sherman eventually withdrew in favor of William Pennington, who was elected.

Republicans were united in opposing slavery in the territories and fugitive slave laws, while rejecting the abrogation of the Missouri Compromise, key aspects of the Compromise of 1850, the Kansas–Nebraska Act, and the Dred Scott decision. Though not yet abolitionist, Republicans openly derived a primary partisan purpose from hostility to slavery while furnishing a mainstream platform for abolitionism. None of the party's views or positions was new. However, their catalytic cohesion into a unified political vehicle, and the bold dismissal of the South, represented a newly disruptive political force.

Democrats remained divided and politically trapped. Fifteen Democratic members publicly defied their party label. Of seven Independent Democrats, six represented Southern districts. Eight Northern anti-Lecompton Democrats favored a ban on slavery in Kansas, effectively upholding the Missouri Compromise their party had destroyed several years earlier. Democrats lacked credible leadership and continued to drift in a direction favorable to the interests of slavery despite obviously widening and intensifying Northern opposition to the expansion of those interests. A damaging public perception also existed that President Buchanan had improperly influenced and endorsed the Dred Scott decision, incorrectly believing that it had solved his main political problem. Such influence would violate the separation of powers. The wide gap between Democratic rhetoric and results alienated voters, while defeat in the North and intra-party defection combined to make the party both more Southern and more radical.

Democrats lost seats in some slave states as the disturbing turn of national events and surge in sectional tensions alarmed a significant minority of Southern voters. Southern politicians opposing both Democrats and extremism, but unwilling to affiliate with Republicans, ran on the Southern Opposition Party ticket (not to be conflated with the Opposition Party of 1854). (Note: See The Kansas-Nebraska act)

For 11 states, this was the last full congressional election until the Reconstruction. Twenty-nine elected members quit near the end of the session following their states' secession from the Union, whose immediate motivation was the result of the presidential election of 1860.

== Election summaries ==
One seat each was added for the new states of Oregon and Kansas.

↓
| 98 | 5 | 19 | 116 |
| Democratic | KN | Opp. | Republican |

| State | Type | Date | Total seats | Democratic (Note: "Democratic" includes Independent Democrats and Anti-Lecompton Democrats.) | | Know Nothing | | Opposition | | Republican | |
| State | Type | Date | Total seats | Seats | Change | Seats | Change | Seats | Change | Seats | Change |
|---|---|---|---|---|---|---|---|---|---|---|---|
| Oregon (Note: New state. Representative seated February 14, 1859.) | At-large | June 7, 1858 | 1 | 1 | ▲1 | 0 | Steady | 0 | Steady | 0 | Steady |
| Arkansas | Districts | August 2, 1858 | 2 | 2 | Steady | 0 | Steady | 0 | Steady | 0 | Steady |
| Missouri | Districts | August 2, 1858 | 7 | 5 (Note: Includes 1 Independent Democrat.) | Steady | 1 | ▼1 | 0 | Steady | 1 | ▲1 |
| Vermont | Districts | September 7, 1858 | 3 | 0 | Steady | 0 | Steady | 0 | Steady | 3 | Steady |
| Maine | Districts | September 13, 1858 | 6 | 0 | Steady | 0 | Steady | 0 | Steady | 6 | Steady |
| Florida | At-large | October 4, 1858 | 1 | 1 | Steady | 0 | Steady | 0 | Steady | 0 | Steady |
| South Carolina | Districts | October 10–11, 1858 | 6 | 6 | Steady | 0 | Steady | 0 | Steady | 0 | Steady |
| Indiana | Districts | October 12, 1858 | 11 | 4 (Note: Includes 1 Anti-Lecompton Democrat.) | ▼2 | 0 | Steady | 0 | Steady | 7 | ▲2 |
| Iowa | Districts | October 12, 1858 | 2 | 0 | Steady | 0 | Steady | 0 | Steady | 2 | Steady |
| Ohio | Districts | October 12, 1858 | 21 | 6 | ▼3 | 0 | Steady | 0 | Steady | 15 | ▲3 |
| Pennsylvania | Districts | October 12, 1858 | 25 | 5 (Note: Includes 2 Anti-Lecompton Democrats.) | ▼10 | 0 | Steady | 0 | Steady | 20 | ▲10 |
| Delaware | At-large | November 2, 1858 (Election Day) (Note: In January 1845, Congress mandated a uniform date for choosing Presidential electors. Gradually, states brought other elections into conformity with this date.) | 1 | 1 | Steady | 0 | Steady | 0 | Steady | 0 | Steady |
| Illinois | Districts | November 2, 1858 (Election Day) | 9 | 5 | Steady | 0 | Steady | 0 | Steady | 4 | Steady |
| Massachusetts | Districts | November 2, 1858 (Election Day) | 11 | 0 | Steady | 0 | Steady | 0 | Steady | 11 | Steady |
| Michigan | Districts | November 2, 1858 (Election Day) | 4 | 0 | Steady | 0 | Steady | 0 | Steady | 4 | Steady |
| New Jersey | Districts | November 2, 1858 (Election Day) | 5 | 2 (Note: Includes 2 Anti-Lecompton Democrats.) | ▼1 | 0 | Steady | 0 | Steady | 3 | ▲1 |
| New York | Districts | November 2, 1858 (Election Day) | 33 | 7 (Note: Includes 1 Independent Democrat and 3 Anti-Lecompton Democrats.) | ▼5 | 0 | Steady | 0 | Steady | 26 | ▲5 |
| Wisconsin | Districts | November 2, 1858 (Election Day) | 3 | 1 | ▲1 | 0 | Steady | 0 | Steady | 2 | ▼1 |
Late elections (after the March 4, 1859 beginning of the term)
| New Hampshire | Districts | March 8, 1859 | 3 | 0 | Steady | 0 | Steady | 0 | Steady | 3 | Steady |
| Connecticut | Districts | April 4, 1859 | 4 | 0 | ▼2 | 0 | Steady | 0 | Steady | 4 | ▲2 |
| Rhode Island | Districts | April 7, 1859 | 2 | 0 | Steady | 0 | Steady | 0 | Steady | 2 | Steady |
| Virginia | Districts | May 26, 1859 | 13 | 12 (Note: Includes 4 Independent Democrats.) | ▼1 | 0 | Steady | 1 | ▲1 | 0 | Steady |
| Alabama | Districts | August 1, 1859 | 7 | 7 | Steady | 0 | Steady | 0 | Steady | 0 | Steady |
| Kentucky | Districts | August 1, 1859 | 10 | 5 | ▼3 | 0 | ▼2 | 5 | ▲5 | 0 | Steady |
| Texas | Districts | August 1, 1859 | 2 | 2 (Note: Includes 1 Independent Democrat.) | Steady | 0 | Steady | 0 | Steady | 0 | Steady |
| North Carolina | Districts | August 4, 1859 | 8 | 4 | ▼3 | 0 | ▼1 | 4 | ▲4 | 0 | Steady |
| Tennessee | Districts | August 4, 1859 | 10 | 3 | ▼4 | 0 | ▼3 | 7 | ▲7 | 0 | Steady |
| California | At-large | September 7, 1859 | 2 | 2 | Steady | 0 | Steady | 0 | Steady | 0 | Steady |
| Georgia | Districts | October 3, 1859 | 8 | 6 | Steady | 0 | ▼2 | 2 | ▲2 | 0 | Steady |
| Mississippi | Districts | October 3, 1859 | 5 | 5 | Steady | 0 | Steady | 0 | Steady | 0 | Steady |
| Minnesota | At-large | October 4, 1859 | 2 | 0 | ▼2 | 0 | Steady | 0 | Steady | 2 | ▲2 |
| Louisiana | Districts | November 7, 1859 | 4 | 3 | Steady | 1 | Steady | 0 | Steady | 0 | Steady |
| Maryland | Districts | November 8, 1859 | 6 | 3 | Steady | 3 | Steady | 0 | Steady | 0 | Steady |
| Kansas (Note: New state. Representative seated January 29, 1861.) | At-large | December 1, 1859 | 1 | 0 | Steady | 0 | Steady | 0 | Steady | 1 | ▲1 |
| Total | | | 238 (Note: An increase of one seat for the new state of Oregon. (See 11 Stat. 383 and United States congressional apportionment.)) | 98 41.4% | ▼35 | 5 2.1% | ▼9 | 19 8.0% | ▲19 | 116 48.5% | ▲26 |

Popular vote
| Democratic | 48.06% |
| Republican | 36.59% |
| Opposition | 5.04% |
| Know Nothing | 3.53% |
| Whig | 0.87% |
| Independent | 6.91% |
| Others | 0.00% |

House seats
| Republican | 47.28% |
| Democratic | 34.72% |
| Opposition | 7.95% |
| Know Nothing | 2.09% |
| Whig | 1.67% |
| Independent | 6.28% |

=== Maps ===
District results by vote share

== Special elections ==
There were special elections in 1858 and 1859 to the 35th United States Congress and 36th United States Congress.

Special elections are sorted by date then district.

=== 35th Congress ===
| District | Incumbent | | | This race | |
| District | Member | Party | First elected | Results | Candidates |
|---|---|---|---|---|---|
| Massachusetts 7 | Nathaniel P. Banks | Republican | 1852 | Incumbent resigned December 24, 1857. New member elected January 7, 1858. Republican hold. | ▌ ✓ Daniel W. Gooch (Republican) 62.56%; ▌George Osborne (Democratic) 32.45%; ▌Luther V. Bell (Independent) 4.98% |
| North Carolina 8 | Thomas L. Clingman | Democratic | 1852 | Incumbent resigned May 7, 1858. New member elected August 5, 1858. Know Nothing gain. | ▌ ✓ Zebulon Vance (Know Nothing) 57.02%; ▌William W. Avery (Democratic) 42.98% |
| Mississippi 5 | John A. Quitman | Democratic | 1855 | Incumbent died July 17, 1858. New member elected October 4, 1858. Democratic hold. | ▌ ✓ John J. McRae (Democratic) 99.08%; Scattering 0.92% |
| Pennsylvania 8 | J. Glancy Jones | Democratic | 1850 | Incumbent resigned October 30, 1858. New member elected November 30, 1858. Republican gain. | ▌ ✓ William H. Keim (Republican) 51.98%; ▌Joel B. Warner (Democratic) 48.02% |
| Illinois 6 | Thomas L. Harris | Democratic | 1854 | Incumbent died November 24, 1858. New member elected January 4, 1859. Democratic hold. | ▌ ✓ Charles D. Hodges (Democratic) 61.31%; ▌James C. Conkling (Republican) 38.69% |
| New York 4 | John Kelly | Democratic | 1854 | Incumbent resigned December 25, 1858. New member elected January 4, 1859. Democratic hold. | ▌ ✓ Thomas J. Barr (Democratic) 96.89%; Scattering 3.11% |

=== 36th Congress ===
| District | Incumbent | | | This race | |
| District | Member | Party | First elected | Results | Candidates |
|---|---|---|---|---|---|
| Ohio 14 | Cyrus Spink | Republican | 1858 | Incumbent died May 31, 1859. New member elected October 11, 1859. Republican hold. | ▌ ✓ Harrison G. O. Blake (Republican) 56.17%; ▌Neal Power (Democratic) 43.83% |
| Virginia 4 | William Goode | Democratic | 1853 | Incumbent died May 31, 1859. New member elected October 27, 1859. Democratic hold. | ▌ ✓ Roger Pryor (Democratic) 55.93%; ▌Thomas F. Goode (Democratic) 44.07% |
| Illinois 6 | Thomas L. Harris | Democratic | 1854 | Incumbent died November 24, 1858. New member elected November 8, 1859. Democratic hold. | ▌ ✓ John A. McClernand (Democratic) 58.92%; ▌John M. Palmer (Republican) 41.08% |

== Alabama ==
| District | Incumbent | | | This race | |
| District | Member | Party | First elected | Results | Candidates |
|---|---|---|---|---|---|
| Alabama 1 | James A. Stallworth | Democratic | 1857 | Incumbent re-elected. | ▌ ✓ James A. Stallworth (Democratic) 63.32%; ▌F. B. Shepard (Opposition) 36.68% |
| Alabama 2 | Eli S. Shorter | Democratic | 1855 | Incumbent retired. Democratic hold. | ▌ ✓ James L. Pugh (Democratic) 81.12%; ▌J. E. Sappington (Opposition) 18.88% |
| Alabama 3 | James F. Dowdell | Democratic | 1853 | Incumbent retired. Democratic hold. | ▌ ✓ David Clopton (Democratic) 50.79%; ▌Thomas J. Judge (Opposition) 49.21% |
| Alabama 4 | Sydenham Moore | Democratic | 1857 | Incumbent re-elected. | ▌ ✓ Sydenham Moore (Democratic) 96.88%; ▌William R. Smith (Unknown) 3.12% |
| Alabama 5 | George S. Houston | Democratic | 1841; 1849 (ret.); 1851 | Incumbent re-elected. | ▌ ✓ George S. Houston (Democratic) 58.12%; ▌William A. Hewlett (Independent Democrat) 41.88% |
| Alabama 6 | Williamson R. W. Cobb | Democratic | 1847 | Incumbent re-elected. | ▌ ✓ Williamson R. W. Cobb (Democratic) 54.98%; ▌Alex Snodgrass (Democratic) 20.26%; ▌Edwin Wallace (Democratic) 18.09%; ▌Henry R. Beaver (Democratic) 6.68% |
| Alabama 7 | Jabez L. M. Curry | Democratic | 1857 | Incumbent retired. Democratic hold. | ▌ ✓ Jabez L. M. Curry (Democratic) ** |

== Arkansas ==
| District | Incumbent | | | This race | |
| District | Member | Party | First elected | Results | Candidates |
|---|---|---|---|---|---|
| Arkansas 1 | Alfred B. Greenwood | Democratic | 1853 | Incumbent retired. Democratic hold. | ▌ ✓ Thomas C. Hindman (Democratic) 86.48%; ▌William Crosby (Know Nothing) 13.52% |
| Arkansas 2 | Edward A. Warren | Democratic | 1857 | Incumbent retired. Democratic hold. | ▌ ✓ Albert Rust (Democratic) 70.32%; ▌Thomas S. Drew (Independent Democratic) 15.10%; ▌James A. Jones (Know Nothing) 13.58% |

== California ==
| District | Incumbent | | | This race | |
| District | Member | Party | First elected | Results | Candidates (Note: California elected two representatives on a general ticket. Dubin calculates the result for each candidate as a percentage of the total number of votes cast.) |
|---|---|---|---|---|---|
| California at-large 2 seats | Charles L. Scott | Democratic | 1856 | Incumbent re-elected as a Lecompton Democrat. Lecompton Democratic gain. | ▌ ✓ John C. Burch (Lecompton Democratic) 56.88%; ▌ ✓ Charles L. Scott (Lecompton Democratic) 55.89%; ▌Joseph C. McKibbin (Anti-Lecompton Democratic; Republican) 43.01%; ▌Edward D. Baker (Republican; Anti-Lecompton Democratic) 41.00%; ▌S. A. Booker (Anti-Lecompton Democratic) 2.94%; ▌P. H. Sibley (Republican) 0.29% |
| California at-large 2 seats | Joseph C. McKibbin | Democratic | 1856 | Incumbent lost re-election as an Anti-Lecompton Democrat. Lecompton Democratic gain. | ▌ ✓ John C. Burch (Lecompton Democratic) 56.88%; ▌ ✓ Charles L. Scott (Lecompton Democratic) 55.89%; ▌Joseph C. McKibbin (Anti-Lecompton Democratic; Republican) 43.01%; ▌Edward D. Baker (Republican; Anti-Lecompton Democratic) 41.00%; ▌S. A. Booker (Anti-Lecompton Democratic) 2.94%; ▌P. H. Sibley (Republican) 0.29% |

== Connecticut ==
| District | Incumbent | | | This race | |
| District | Member | Party | First elected | Results | Candidates |
|---|---|---|---|---|---|
| Connecticut 1 | Ezra Clark Jr. | Republican | 1855 | Incumbent lost renomination. Republican hold. | ▌ ✓ Dwight Loomis (Republican) 49.61%; ▌Alvan P. Hyde (Democratic) 49.29%; ▌Ezra Clark Jr. (Independent) 1.10% |
| Connecticut 2 | Samuel Arnold | Democratic | 1857 | Incumbent lost re-election. Republican gain. | ▌ ✓ John Woodruff (Republican) 50.56%; ▌Samuel Arnold (Democratic) 49.03%; ▌Austin Baldwin (Unknown) 0.41% |
| Connecticut 3 | Sidney Dean | Republican | 1855 | Incumbent retired. Republican hold. | ▌ ✓ Alfred A. Burnham (Republican) 51.74%; ▌Rufus L. Baker (Democratic) 46.95%; ▌Sidney Dean (Independent) 1.31% |
| Connecticut 4 | William D. Bishop | Democratic | 1857 | Incumbent lost re-election. Republican gain. | ▌ ✓ Orris S. Ferry (Republican) 51.27%; ▌William D. Bishop (Democratic) 48.73% |

== Delaware ==
| District | Incumbent | | | This race | |
| District | Member | Party | First elected | Results | Candidates |
|---|---|---|---|---|---|
| Delaware at-large | William G. Whiteley | Democratic | 1856 | Incumbent re-elected. | ▌ ✓ William G. Whiteley (Democratic) 51.36%; ▌ William H. Morris (People's) 48.64% |

== Florida ==
| District | Incumbent | | | This race | |
| District | Member | Party | First elected | Results | Candidates |
|---|---|---|---|---|---|
| Florida at-large | George Sydney Hawkins | Democratic | 1856 | Incumbent re-elected. | ▌ ✓ George S. Hawkins (Democratic) 62.43%; ▌John Westcott (Independent Democrat) 37.57% |

== Georgia ==
| District | Incumbent | | | This race | |
| District | Member | Party | First elected | Results | Candidates |
|---|---|---|---|---|---|
| Georgia 1 | James Lindsay Seward | Democratic | 1853 | Incumbent retired. Democratic hold. | ▌ ✓ Peter E. Love (Democratic) 65.03%; ▌Alexander T. McIntyre (Opposition) 34.97% |
| Georgia 2 | Martin J. Crawford | Democratic | 1855 | Incumbent re-elected. | ▌ ✓ Martin J. Crawford (Democratic) 54.71%; ▌Marcellus Douglass (Opposition) 42.54% |
| Georgia 3 | Robert Pleasant Trippe | Know Nothing | 1855 | Incumbent retired. Opposition gain. | ▌ ✓ Thomas Hardeman Jr. (Opposition) 50.69%; ▌A. M. Speer (Democratic) 49.31% |
| Georgia 4 | Lucius J. Gartrell | Democratic | 1857 | Incumbent re-elected. | ▌ ✓ Lucius J. Gartrell (Democratic) 59.46%; ▌William F. Wright (Opposition) 40.54% |
| Georgia 5 | Augustus R. Wright | Democratic | 1857 | Incumbent retired. Democratic hold. | ▌ ✓ John W. H. Underwood (Democratic) 85.09%; ▌J. H. Shakelford (Independent) 14.91% |
| Georgia 6 | James Jackson | Democratic | 1857 | Incumbent re-elected. | ▌ ✓ James Jackson (Democratic) 74.79%; ▌A. T. Lytle (Independent) 25.21% |
| Georgia 7 | Joshua Hill | Know Nothing | 1857 | Incumbent re-elected as an Oppositionist. Opposition gain. | ▌ ✓ Joshua Hill (Opposition) 50.77%; ▌R. G. Harper (Democratic) 49.23% |
| Georgia 8 | Alexander H. Stephens | Democratic | 1843 (sp.) | Incumbent retired. Democratic hold. | ▌ ✓ John James Jones (Democratic) 52.15%; ▌A. Ranse Wright (Opposition) 47.85% |

== Illinois ==
| District | Incumbent | | | This race | |
| District | Member | Party | First elected | Results | Candidates |
|---|---|---|---|---|---|
| Illinois 1 | Elihu B. Washburne | Republican | 1852 | Incumbent re-elected. | ▌ ✓ Elihu B. Washburne (Republican) 69.84%; ▌Hiram Bright (Democratic) 28.52%; ▌Richard H. Jackson (Anti-Lecompton Democratic) 1.63% |
| Illinois 2 | John F. Farnsworth | Republican | 1854 | Incumbent re-elected. | ▌ ✓ John F. Farnsworth (Republican) 61.06%; ▌Thomas Dyer (Democratic) 36.97%; ▌B. F. Blackburn (Anti-Lecompton Democratic) 1.96% |
| Illinois 3 | Owen Lovejoy | Republican | 1852 | Incumbent re-elected. | ▌ ✓ Owen Lovejoy (Republican) 57.76%; ▌George W. Armstrong (Democratic) 38.80%; ▌David Leroy (Anti-Lecompton Democratic) 3.44% |
| Illinois 4 | William Kellogg | Republican | 1852 | Incumbent re-elected. | ▌ ✓ William Kellogg (Republican) 52.81%; ▌Hiram Bright (Democratic) 45.69%; ▌Jacob Gale (Anti-Lecompton Democratic) 1.50% |
| Illinois 5 | Isaac N. Morris | Democratic | 1856 | Incumbent re-elected. | ▌ ✓ Isaac N. Morris (Democratic) 52.68%; ▌Jackson Grimshaw (Republican) 45.36%; ▌Jacob C. Davis (Anti-Lecompton Democratic) 1.96% |
| Illinois 6 | Thomas L. Harris | Democratic | 1848; 1850 (lost); 1854 | Incumbent re-elected. | ▌ ✓ Thomas L. Harris (Democratic) 57.60%; ▌James N. Mathews (Republican) 41.42%; ▌John S. McConnell (Anti-Lecompton Democratic) 0.98% |
| Illinois 7 | Aaron Shaw | Democratic | 1856 | Incumbent retired. Democratic hold. | ▌ ✓ James Carroll Robinson (Democratic) 53.53%; ▌Richard J. Oglesby (Republican) 46.33%; ▌S. G. Baldwin (Anti-Lecompton Democratic) 0.45% |
| Illinois 8 | Robert Smith | Democratic | 1856 | Incumbent retired. Democratic hold. | ▌ ✓ Philip B. Fouke (Democratic) 57.17%; ▌John Baker (Republican) 41.84%; ▌Thomas M. Hope (Anti-Lecompton Democratic) 0.99% |
| Illinois 9 | Samuel S. Marshall | Democratic | 1854 | Incumbent retired. Democratic hold. | ▌ ✓ John A. Logan (Democratic) 84.38%; ▌David L. Phillips (Republican) 14.86%; ▌William K. Parrish (Anti-Lecompton Democratic) 0.77% |

== Indiana ==
| District | Incumbent | | | This race | |
| District | Member | Party | First elected | Results | Candidates |
|---|---|---|---|---|---|
| Indiana 1 | James Lockhart | Democratic | 1856 | Incumbent retired. Democratic hold. | ▌ ✓ William E. Niblack (Democratic) 53.58%; ▌Alvin Peterson Hovey (Republican) 46.42% |
| Indiana 2 | William Hayden English | Democratic | 1852 | Incumbent re-elected. | ▌ ✓ William Hayden English (Democratic) 55.56%; ▌John M. Wilson (Republican) 44.44% |
| Indiana 3 | James Hughes | Democratic | 1856 | Incumbent lost re-election. Republican gain. | ▌ ✓ William McKee Dunn (Republican) 48.82%; ▌James Hughes (Democratic) 43.72%; ▌George W. Carr (Anti-Lecompton Democratic) 7.47% |
| Indiana 4 | James Bradford Foley | Democratic | 1856 | Incumbent retired. Democratic hold. | ▌ ✓ William S. Holman (Democratic) 54.80%; ▌P. S. Hackleman (Republican) 45.20% |
| Indiana 5 | David Kilgore | Republican | 1856 | Incumbent re-elected. | ▌ ✓ David Kilgore (Republican) 61.31%; ▌Lafe Devlin (Democratic) 38.69% |
| Indiana 6 | James M. Gregg | Democratic | 1856 | Incumbent retired. Republican gain. | ▌ ✓ Albert G. Porter (Republican) 52.59%; ▌Martin M. Ray (Democratic) 47.41% |
| Indiana 7 | John G. Davis | Democratic | 1856 | Incumbent re-elected as an Anti-Lecompton Democrat. Anti-Lecompton Democratic gain. | ▌ ✓ John G. Davis (Anti-Lecompton Democratic) 58.95%; ▌Harry Secrest (Democratic) 41.05% |
| Indiana 8 | James Wilson | Republican | 1856 | Incumbent re-elected. | ▌ ✓ James Wilson (Republican) 51.50%; ▌John W. Blake (Democratic) 48.50% |
| Indiana 9 | Schuyler Colfax | Republican | 1854 | Incumbent re-elected. | ▌ ✓ Schuyler Colfax (Republican) 53.56%; ▌John C. Walker (Democratic) 46.44% |
| Indiana 10 | Samuel Brenton | Republican | 1854 | Incumbent retired. Republican hold. | ▌ ✓ Charles Case (Republican) 53.37%; ▌Reuben J. Dawson (Democratic) 46.63% |
| Indiana 11 | John U. Pettit | Republican | 1854 | Incumbent re-elected. | ▌ ✓ John U. Pettit (Republican) 51.71%; ▌John R. Coffroth (Democratic) 48.29% |

== Iowa ==
| District | Incumbent | | | This race | |
| District | Member | Party | First elected | Results | Candidates |
|---|---|---|---|---|---|
| Iowa 1 | Samuel Ryan Curtis | Republican | 1856 | Incumbent re-elected. | ▌ ✓ Samuel Ryan Curtis (Republican) 50.65%; ▌Henry H. Trimble (Democratic) 49.35% |
| Iowa 2 | Timothy Davis | Republican | 1856 | Incumbent retired. Republican hold. | ▌ ✓ William Vandever (Republican) 52.84%; ▌William E. Leffingwell (Democratic) 47.16% |

== Kansas ==
| District | Incumbent | | | This race | |
| District | Member | Party | First elected | Results | Candidates |
|---|---|---|---|---|---|
| Kansas at-large | New state (Note: The United States Congress recognized Kansas statehood on January 21, 1861, after this election.) | | | New seat. Republican gain. | ▌ ✓ Martin F. Conway (Republican) 57.74%; ▌John A. Halderman (Democratic) 42.26% |

== Kansas Territory ==
See non-voting delegates, below.

== Kentucky ==
| District | Incumbent | | | This race | |
| District | Member | Party | First elected | Results | Candidates |
|---|---|---|---|---|---|
| Kentucky 1 | Henry Cornelius Burnett | Democratic | 1855 | Incumbent re-elected. | ▌ ✓ Henry Cornelius Burnett (Democratic) 83.70%; ▌William Morrow (Opposition) 16.30% |
| Kentucky 2 | Samuel Peyton | Democratic | 1857 | Incumbent re-elected. | ▌ ✓ Samuel Peyton (Democratic) 52.44%; ▌James S. Jackson (Opposition) 47.56% |
| Kentucky 3 | Warner Underwood | Know Nothing | 1855 | Incumbent retired. Opposition gain. | ▌ ✓ Francis Bristow (Opposition) 56.24%; ▌W. W. Sale (Democratic) 43.76% |
| Kentucky 4 | Albert G. Talbott | Democratic | 1855 | Incumbent retired. Opposition gain. | ▌ ✓ William Clayton Anderson (Opposition) 50.01%; ▌James Chrisman (Democratic) 49.99% |
| Kentucky 5 | Joshua Jewett | Democratic | 1855 | Incumbent lost re-election as an Oppositionist. Democratic hold. | ▌ ✓ John Y. Brown (Democratic) 57.76%; ▌Joshua Jewett (Opposition) 42.24% |
| Kentucky 6 | John Milton Elliott | Democratic | 1853 | Incumbent retired. Opposition gain. | ▌ ✓ Green Adams (Opposition) 53.03%; ▌Thomas T. Garrard (Democratic) 46.97% |
| Kentucky 7 | Humphrey Marshall | Know Nothing | 1855 | Incumbent retired. Opposition gain. | ▌ ✓ Robert Mallory (Opposition) 53.06%; ▌Thomas Holt (Democratic) 46.94% |
| Kentucky 8 | James Brown Clay | Democratic | 1857 | Incumbent retired. Democratic hold. | ▌ ✓ William E. Simms (Democratic) 50.24%; ▌John Marshall Harlan (Opposition) 49.76% |
| Kentucky 9 | John Calvin Mason | Democratic | 1857 | Incumbent retired. Opposition gain. | ▌ ✓ Laban T. Moore (Opposition) 50.83%; ▌James William Moore (Democratic) 49.17% |
| Kentucky 10 | John W. Stevenson | Democratic | 1857 | Incumbent re-elected. | ▌ ✓ John W. Stevenson (Democratic) 61.42%; ▌Thomas L. Jones (Opposition) 38.58% |

== Louisiana ==
| District | Incumbent | | | This race | |
| District | Member | Party | First elected | Results | Candidates |
|---|---|---|---|---|---|
| Louisiana 1 | George Eustis Jr. | Know Nothing | 1854 | Incumbent retired. Know Nothing hold. | ▌ ✓ John Edward Bouligny (Know Nothing) 49.55%; ▌Emile La Sére (Democratic) 40.18%; ▌Charles Bienvenu (Unknown) 10.27% |
| Louisiana 2 | Miles Taylor | Democratic | 1854 | Incumbent re-elected. | ▌ ✓ Miles Taylor (Democratic) 56.99%; ▌L. D. Nichols (Know Nothing) 43.01% |
| Louisiana 3 | Thomas G. Davidson | Democratic | 1854 | Incumbent re-elected. | ▌ ✓ Thomas G. Davidson (Democratic) 89.25%; ▌T. Cannon (Know Nothing) 10.75% |
| Louisiana 4 | John M. Sandidge | Democratic | 1854 | Incumbent retired. Democratic hold. | ▌ ✓ John M. Landrum (Democratic) 74.42%; ▌M. A. Jones (Know Nothing) 25.58% |

== Maine ==
| District | Incumbent | | | This race | |
| District | Member | Party | First elected | Results | Candidates |
|---|---|---|---|---|---|
| Maine 1 | John M. Wood | Republican | 1854 | Incumbent retired. Republican hold. | ▌ ✓ Daniel E. Somes (Republican) 50.57%; ▌Ira T. Drew (Democratic) 48.36%; ▌Manassah H. Smith (Democratic) 1.06% |
| Maine 2 | Charles J. Gilman | Republican | 1856 | Incumbent retired. Republican hold. | ▌ ✓ John J. Perry (Republican) 54.53%; ▌David B. Hastings (Democratic) 45.47% |
| Maine 3 | Nehemiah Abbott | Republican | 1856 | Incumbent retired. Republican hold. | ▌ ✓ Ezra B. French (Republican) 50.18%; ▌Alfred W. Johnson (Democratic) 49.82% |
| Maine 4 | Freeman H. Morse | Republican | 1856 | Incumbent re-elected. | ▌ ✓ Freeman H. Morse (Republican) 60.15%; ▌Asa Gile (Democratic) 39.85% |
| Maine 5 | Israel Washburn Jr. | Republican | 1850 | Incumbent re-elected. | ▌ ✓ Israel Washburn Jr. (Republican) 55.72%; ▌ James S. Wiley (Democratic) 44.28% |
| Maine 6 | Stephen C. Foster | Republican | 1856 | Incumbent re-elected. | ▌ ✓ Stephen Clark Foster (Republican) 51.53%; ▌Bion Bradbury (Democratic) 48.47% |

== Maryland ==
| District | Incumbent | | | This race | |
| District | Member | Party | First elected | Results | Candidates |
|---|---|---|---|---|---|
| Maryland 1 | James Augustus Stewart | Democratic | 1855 | Incumbent re-elected. | ▌ ✓ James Augustus Stewart (Democratic) 52.07%; ▌Teagle Townsend (Know Nothing) 47.93% |
| Maryland 2 | James B. Ricaud | Know Nothing | 1855 | Incumbent retired. Know Nothing hold. | ▌ ✓ Edwin H. Webster (Know Nothing) 52.02%; ▌Ramsey McHenry (Democratic) 47.98% |
| Maryland 3 | J. Morrison Harris | Know Nothing | 1855 | Incumbent re-elected. | ▌ ✓ J. Morrison Harris (Know Nothing) 69.47%; ▌William Pinkney Whyte (Democratic) 30.53% |
| Maryland 4 | Henry Winter Davis | Know Nothing | 1855 | Incumbent re-elected. | ▌ ✓ Henry Winter Davis (Know Nothing) 78.26%; ▌William G. Harrison (Independent) 21.74% |
| Maryland 5 | Jacob Michael Kunkel | Democratic | 1857 | Incumbent re-elected. | ▌ ✓ Jacob Michael Kunkel (Democratic) 50.38%; ▌Henry William Hoffman (Know Nothing) 49.62% |
| Maryland 6 | Thomas Fielder Bowie | Democratic | 1855 | Incumbent retired. Democratic hold. | ▌ ✓ George W. Hughes (Democratic) 54.21%; ▌Alexander Burton Hagner (Know Nothing) 45.79% |

== Massachusetts ==
| District | Incumbent | | | This race | |
| District | Member | Party | First elected | Results | Candidates |
|---|---|---|---|---|---|
| Massachusetts 1 | Robert Bernard Hall | Republican | 1854 | Incumbent retired. Republican hold. | ▌ ✓ Thomas D. Eliot (Republican) 72.6%; ▌ Moses Bates Jr. (Democratic) 25.6% |
| Massachusetts 2 | James Buffington | Republican | 1854 | Incumbent re-elected. | ▌ ✓ James Buffington (Republican) 71.4%; ▌ John Wilson (Democratic) 28.5% |
| Massachusetts 3 | William S. Damrell | Republican | 1854 | Incumbent retired. Republican hold. | ▌ ✓ Charles Francis Adams Sr. (Republican) 54.9%; ▌ Arthur W. Austin (Democratic) 32.6%; ▌ Moses G. Cobb (Know Nothing) 12.3% |
| Massachusetts 4 | Linus B. Comins | Republican | 1854 | Incumbent retired. Republican hold. | ▌ ✓ Alexander H. Rice (Republican) 47.7%; ▌ Samuel W. Waldron (Democratic) 37.2%; ▌ Newell A. Thompson (Know Nothing) 14.8% |
| Massachusetts 5 | Anson Burlingame | Republican | 1854 | Incumbent re-elected. | ▌ ✓ Anson Burlingame (Republican) 51.5%; ▌ John F. Heard (Democratic) 48.2% |
| Massachusetts 6 | Timothy Davis | Republican | 1854 | Incumbent retired. Republican hold. | ▌ ✓ John B. Alley (Republican) 52.0%; ▌ Otis Lord (Know Nothing) 28.1%; ▌ George B. Loring (Democratic) 19.7% |
| Massachusetts 7 | Daniel W. Gooch | Republican | 1858 | Incumbent re-elected. | ▌ ✓ Daniel W. Gooch (Republican) 60.3%; ▌ Charles A. Welch (Democratic) 32.7%; ▌ Elihu C. Baker (Know Nothing) 6.9% |
| Massachusetts 8 | Chauncey L. Knapp | Republican | 1854 | Incumbent retired. Republican hold. | ▌ ✓ Charles R. Train (Republican) 58.9%; ▌ Benjamin Butler (Democratic) 33.4%; ▌ Josiah H. Temple (Know Nothing) 5.5% |
| Massachusetts 9 | Eli Thayer | Republican | 1856 | Incumbent re-elected. | ▌ ✓ Eli Thayer (Republican) 70.9%; ▌ Nathaniel Wood (Democratic) 28.8% |
| Massachusetts 10 | Calvin C. Chaffee | Republican | 1854 | Incumbent retired. Republican hold. | ▌ ✓ Charles Delano (Republican) 64.1%; ▌ Charles Osgood (Democratic) 30.7%; ▌ Mark Trafton (Know Nothing) 4.8% |
| Massachusetts 11 | Henry L. Dawes | Republican | 1856 | Incumbent re-elected. | ▌ ✓ Henry L. Dawes (Republican) 60.8%; ▌ Thomas F. Plunkett (Democratic) 39.1% |

== Michigan ==
| District | Incumbent | | | This race | |
| District | Member | Party | First elected | Results | Candidates |
|---|---|---|---|---|---|
| Michigan 1 | William A. Howard | Republican | 1854 | Incumbent lost re-election. Democratic gain. | ▌ ✓ George B. Cooper (Democratic) 50.14%; ▌William A. Howard (Republican) 49.86% |
| Michigan 1 | William A. Howard | Republican | 1854 | Election successfully contested. Incumbent re-seated May 15, 1860. | ▌ ✓ William A. Howard (Republican) 51.03%; ▌George B. Cooper (Democratic) 48.97% |
| Michigan 2 | Henry Waldron | Republican | 1854 | Incumbent re-elected. | ▌ ✓ Henry Waldron (Republican) 59.11%; ▌Consider A. Stacy (Democratic) 40.89% |
| Michigan 3 | David S. Walbridge | Republican | 1854 | Incumbent retired. Republican hold. | ▌ ✓ Francis W. Kellogg (Republican) 55.73%; ▌Thomas B. Church (Democratic) 44.27% |
| Michigan 4 | Dewitt C. Leach | Republican | 1856 | Incumbent re-elected. | ▌ ✓ Dewitt C. Leach (Republican) 51.97%; ▌Robert W. Davis (Democratic) 48.03% |

== Minnesota ==
Minnesota became a new state in 1858 having already elected its first two members at-large in October 1857 to finish the current term. The state then held elections to the next term October 4, 1859.

| District | Incumbent | | | This race | |
| District | Member | Party | First elected | Results | Candidates |
|---|---|---|---|---|---|
| Minnesota at-large 2 seats | James M. Cavanaugh | Democratic | 1857 | Incumbent lost re-election. Republican gain. | Elected on a general ticket: ▌ ✓ Cyrus Aldrich (Republican) 55.08%; ▌ ✓ William Windom (Republican) 54.2%; ▌James M. Cavanaugh (Democratic) 45.56%; ▌Christopher C. Graham (Democratic) 45.16% |
| Minnesota at-large 2 seats | William Wallace Phelps | Democratic | 1857 | Unknown if incumbent retired or lost re-election. Republican gain. | Elected on a general ticket: ▌ ✓ Cyrus Aldrich (Republican) 55.08%; ▌ ✓ William Windom (Republican) 54.2%; ▌James M. Cavanaugh (Democratic) 45.56%; ▌Christopher C. Graham (Democratic) 45.16% |

== Mississippi ==
Elections held late, on October 3, 1859.

| District | Incumbent | | | This race | |
| District | Member | Party | First elected | Results | Candidates |
|---|---|---|---|---|---|
| Mississippi 1 | Lucius Q. C. Lamar | Democratic | 1857 | Incumbent re-elected. | ▌ ✓ Lucius Q. C. Lamar (Democratic) 100% |
| Mississippi 2 | Reuben Davis | Democratic | 1857 | Incumbent re-elected. | ▌ ✓ Reuben Davis (Democratic) 94.49%; ▌G. Q. Martin (Opposition) 5.51% |
| Mississippi 3 | William Barksdale | Democratic | 1853 | Incumbent re-elected. | ▌ ✓ William Barksdale (Democratic) 100% |
| Mississippi 4 | Otho R. Singleton | Democratic | 1857 | Incumbent re-elected. | ▌ ✓ Otho R. Singleton (Democratic) 77.19%; ▌Franklin Smith (Unionist Democratic) 22.81% |
| Mississippi 5 | John J. McRae | Democratic | 1858 (special) | Incumbent re-elected. | ▌ ✓ John J. McRae (Democratic) 100% |

== Missouri ==
| District | Incumbent | | | This race | |
| District | Member | Party | First elected | Results | Candidates |
|---|---|---|---|---|---|
| Missouri 1 | Francis Preston Blair Jr. | Benton Democratic - Republican | 1856 | Incumbent lost re-election. Democratic gain. | ▌ ✓ John R. Barret (Democratic) 36.5%; ▌ Francis Preston Blair Jr. (Republican) 34.3%; ▌ Samuel M. Breckinridge (Know Nothing) 29.3% |
| Missouri 1 | Francis Preston Blair Jr. | Benton Democratic - Republican | 1856 | Election successfully contested. Incumbent re-seated June 8, 1860. | ▌ ✓ Francis Preston Blair Jr. (Republican); ▌John R. Barret (Democratic); ▌ Samuel M. Breckinridge (Know Nothing) |
| Missouri 2 | Thomas L. Anderson | Know Nothing | 1856 | Incumbent re-elected as an Independent Democratic candidate. Independent Democratic gain. | ▌ ✓ Thomas L. Anderson (Ind. Democratic) 62.2%; ▌ John B. Henderson (Democratic) 35.8% |
| Missouri 3 | John Bullock Clark | Democratic | 1857 | Incumbent re-elected. | ▌ ✓ John Bullock Clark (Democratic) 100% |
| Missouri 4 | James Craig | Democratic | 1856 | Incumbent re-elected. | ▌ ✓ James Craig (Democratic) 61.4%; ▌ James H. Adams (Know Nothing) 38.6% |
| Missouri 5 | Samuel H. Woodson | Know; Nothing | 1856 | Incumbent re-elected. | ▌ ✓ Samuel H. Woodson (Know Nothing) 53.3%; ▌ John William Reid (Democratic) 46.7% |
| Missouri 6 | John S. Phelps | Democratic | 1844 | Incumbent re-elected. | ▌ ✓ John S. Phelps (Democratic) 62.5%; ▌ John M. Richardson (Ind. Democratic) 37.5% |
| Missouri 7 | Samuel Caruthers | Democratic | 1852 | Incumbent retired. Democratic hold. | ▌ ✓ John W. Noell (Democratic) 64.2%; ▌ C. C. Zeigler (Independent) 35.8% |

== Nebraska Territory ==
See non-voting delegates, below.

== New Hampshire ==
| District | Incumbent | | | This race | |
| District | Member | Party | First elected | Results | Candidates |
|---|---|---|---|---|---|
| New Hampshire 1 | James Pike | Republican | 1855 | Incumbent retired. Republican hold. | ▌ ✓ Gilman Marston (Republican) 51.5%; ▌ Daniel Marcy (Democratic) 48.5% |
| New Hampshire 2 | Mason Tappan | Republican | 1855 | Incumbent re-elected. | ▌ ✓ Mason Tappan (Republican) 52.5%; ▌ John Hatch George (Democratic) 47.5% |
| New Hampshire 3 | Aaron H. Cragin | Republican | 1855 | Incumbent retired. Republican hold. | ▌ ✓ Thomas M. Edwards (Republican) 52.4%; ▌ William Burns (Democratic) 47.6% |

== New Jersey ==
| District | Incumbent | | | This race | |
| District | Member | Party | First elected | Results | Candidates |
|---|---|---|---|---|---|
| New Jersey 1 | Isaiah D. Clawson | Republican | 1854 | Incumbent retired. Republican hold. | ▌ ✓ John T. Nixon (Republican) 48.0%; ▌ [FNU] Walker (Democratic) 30.6%; ▌ John T. Jones (Know Nothing) 21.4% |
| New Jersey 2 | George R. Robbins | Republican | 1854 | Incumbent retired. Republican hold. | ▌ ✓ John L. N. Stratton (Republican) 56.7%; ▌ James Walter Wall (Democratic) 43.3% |
| New Jersey 3 | Garnett Adrain | Democratic | 1856 | Incumbent re-elected as an Anti-Lecompton Democratic candidate. Anti-Lecompton Democratic gain. | ▌ ✓ Garnett Adrain (Anti-Lecompton Democratic) 51.2%; ▌ William Paterson (Democratic) 48.8% |
| New Jersey 4 | John Huyler | Democratic | 1856 | Incumbent lost re-election. Anti-Lecompton Democratic gain. | ▌ ✓ Jetur R. Riggs (Anti-Lecompton Democratic) 52.0%; ▌ John Huyler (Democratic) 48.0% |
| New Jersey 5 | Jacob R. Wortendyke | Democratic | 1856 | Incumbent lost re-election. Republican gain. | ▌ ✓ William Pennington (Republican) 53.8%; ▌ Jacob R. Wortendyke (Democratic) 46.2% |

== New York ==
| District | Incumbent | | | This race | |
| District | Member | Party | First elected | Results | Candidates |
|---|---|---|---|---|---|
| New York 1 | John A. Searing | Democratic | 1856 | Incumbent lost re-election. Republican - Know Nothing gain. | ▌ ✓ Luther C. Carter (Republican / Know Nothing) 52.5%; ▌ John A. Searing (Democratic) 47.5% |
| New York 2 | George Taylor | Democratic | 1856 | Incumbent lost re-election. Republican gain. | ▌ ✓ James Humphrey (Republican) 36.8%; ▌ Edwin C. Litchfield (Independent Democratic) 31.7%; ▌ George Taylor (Democratic) 26.0%; ▌ Edward T. Backhouse (Know Nothing) 5.5% |
| New York 3 | Daniel Sickles | Democratic | 1856 | Incumbent re-elected. | ▌ ✓ Daniel Sickles (Democratic) 35.0%; ▌ Amor J. Williamson (Know Nothing / Republican) 33.3%; ▌ Hiram Walbridge (Independent Democratic) 31.7% |
| New York 4 | John Kelly | Democratic | 1854 | Incumbent resigned. Winner also elected to finish term. Independent Democratic gain. | ▌ ✓ Thomas J. Barr (Independent Democratic) 39.7%; ▌ Thomas Stephens (Independent Democratic) 26.8%; ▌ Owen W. Brennan (Republican) 23.0%; ▌ [FNU] Farmer (Democratic) 7.1%; ▌ Samuel F. Husted (Know Nothing) 3.1% |
| New York 5 | William B. Maclay | Democratic | 1856 | Incumbent re-elected. | ▌ ✓ William B. Maclay (Democratic) 49.8%; ▌ Philip Hamilton (Republican) 42.9%; ▌ Gilbert Dean (Know Nothing) 7.1% |
| New York 6 | John Cochrane | Democratic | 1856 | Incumbent re-elected. | ▌ ✓ John Cochrane (Democratic) 57.1%; ▌ Robert Henry McCurdy (Republican / Know Nothing) 42.9% |
| New York 7 | Elijah Ward | Democratic | 1856 | Incumbent lost re-election. Know Nothing - Republican gain. | ▌ ✓ George Briggs (Know Nothing / Republican) 55.8%; ▌ Elijah Ward (Democratic) 44.2% |
| New York 8 | Horace F. Clark | Democratic | 1856 | Incumbent re-elected as an Anti-Lecompton Democratic candidate. Anti-Lecompton Democratic gain. | ▌ ✓ Horace F. Clark (Anti-Lecompton Democratic / R / KK) 58.8%; ▌ Anson Herrick (Democratic) 41.2% |
| New York 9 | John B. Haskin | Democratic | 1856 | Incumbent re-elected as an Anti-Lecompton Democratic candidate. Anti-Lecompton Democratic gain. | ▌ ✓ John B. Haskin (Anti-Lecompton Democratic / Republican) 48.3%; ▌ Gouverneur Kemble (Democratic) 48.2%; ▌ Edward W. Andrews (Know Nothing) 3.5% |
| New York 10 | Ambrose S. Murray | Republican | 1854 | Incumbent retired. Republican hold. | ▌ ✓ Charles Van Wyck (Republican) 48.4%; ▌ Archibald C. Niven (Democratic) 40.1%; ▌ J. D. Friend (Know Nothing) 11.5% |
| New York 11 | William Fiero Russell | Democratic | 1856 | Incumbent retired. Republican - Know Nothing gain. | ▌ ✓ William S. Kenyon (Republican / Know Nothing) 50.3%; ▌ Daniel B. Strong (Democratic) 49.7% |
| New York 12 | John Thompson | Republican | 1856 | Incumbent retired. Republican - Know Nothing hold. | ▌ ✓ Charles Lewis Beale (Republican / Know Nothing) 56.2%; ▌ Hugh W. McClellan (Democratic) 43.8% |
| New York 13 | Abram B. Olin | Republican | 1856 | Incumbent re-elected. | ▌ ✓ Abram B. Olin (Republican / Know Nothing) 61.1%; ▌ David L. Seymour (Democratic) 38.9% |
| New York 14 | Erastus Corning | Democratic | 1856 | Incumbent lost re-election. Anti-Lecompton Democratic gain. | ▌ ✓ John H. Reynolds (Anti-Lecompton Democratic / Republican) 52.6%; ▌ Erastus Corning (Democratic) 46.0%; ▌ John D. Livingston (Know Nothing) 1.4% |
| New York 15 | Edward Dodd | Republican | 1854 | Incumbent retired. Republican hold. | ▌ ✓ James B. McKean (Republican) 53.8%; ▌ [FNU] Odell (Democratic) 46.2% |
| New York 16 | George W. Palmer | Republican | 1856 | Incumbent re-elected. | ▌ ✓ George W. Palmer (Republican) 47.9%; ▌ [FNU] Waldo (Democratic) 41.3%; ▌ Charles M. Watson (Know Nothing) 10.8% |
| New York 17 | Francis E. Spinner | Republican | 1854 | Incumbent re-elected. | ▌ ✓ Francis E. Spinner (Republican) 68.7%; ▌ [FNU] Goodrich (Democratic) 31.3% |
| New York 18 | Clark B. Cochrane | Republican | 1856 | Incumbent re-elected. | ▌ ✓ Clark B. Cochrane (Republican / Know Nothing) 53.2%; ▌ Charles Goodyear (Democratic) 46.8% |
| New York 19 | Oliver A. Morse | Republican | 1856 | Incumbent retired. Republican hold. | ▌ ✓ James H. Graham (Republican) 55.1%; ▌ Robert Parker (Democratic) 44.9% |
| New York 20 | Orsamus B. Matteson | Republican | 1852 | Incumbent retired. Republican hold. | ▌ ✓ Roscoe Conkling (Republican) 57.3%; ▌ P. Sheldon Root (Democratic) 42.7% |
| New York 21 | Henry Bennett | Republican | 1848 | Incumbent lost renomination. Republican hold. | ▌ ✓ R. Holland Duell (Republican) 56.5%; ▌ [FNU] Sands (Democratic) 42.0%; ▌ Moses La Grange (Know Nothing) 1.5% |
| New York 22 | Henry C. Goodwin | Republican | 1856 | Incumbent retired. Republican hold. | ▌ ✓ M. Lindley Lee (Republican) 57.4%; ▌ [FNU] Tyler (Democratic) 37.2%; ▌ Albertus Perry (Know Nothing) 5.3% |
| New York 23 | Charles B. Hoard | Republican | 1856 | Incumbent re-elected. | ▌ ✓ Charles B. Hoard (Republican) 56.1%; ▌ Caleb Lyon (Democratic) 43.9% |
| New York 24 | Amos P. Granger | Republican | 1854 | Incumbent retired. Republican hold. | ▌ ✓ Charles B. Sedgwick (Republican) 55.1%; ▌ [FNU] Taylor (Democratic) 40.7%; ▌ B. Davis Noxon (Know Nothing) 4.2% |
| New York 25 | Edwin B. Morgan | Republican | 1852 | Incumbent retired. Republican hold. | ▌ ✓ Martin Butterfield (Republican) 60.7%; ▌ Aaron Griswold (Democratic) 30.2%; ▌ William H. Sisson (Know Nothing) 9.1% |
| New York 26 | Emory B. Pottle | Republican | 1856 | Incumbent re-elected. | ▌ ✓ Emory B. Pottle (Republican / Know Nothing) 54.5%; ▌ Darius A. Ogden (Democratic) 45.5% |
| New York 27 | John M. Parker | Republican | 1854 | Incumbent retired. Republican hold. | ▌ ✓ Alfred Wells (Republican) 49.2%; ▌ John Arnot Jr. (Democratic) 47.5%; ▌ William T. Lawrence (Know Nothing) 3.3% |
| New York 28 | William H. Kelsey | Republican | 1854 | Incumbent retired. Republican hold. | ▌ ✓ William Irvine (Republican) 53.3%; ▌ [FNU] Bradley (Democratic) 37.3%; ▌ Goldsmith Dennison (Know Nothing) 9.4% |
| New York 29 | Samuel G. Andrews | Republican | 1856 | Incumbent retired. Republican hold. | ▌ ✓ Alfred Ely (Republican) 52.8%; ▌ Eliphaz Trimmer (Democratic) 37.1%; ▌ James L. Angle (Know Nothing) 10.1% |
| New York 30 | Judson W. Sherman | Republican | 1856 | Incumbent retired. Republican hold. | ▌ ✓ Augustus Frank (Republican) 56.6%; ▌ [FNU] Skinner (Democratic) 30.5%; ▌ James W. Black (Know Nothing) 12.9% |
| New York 31 | Silas M. Burroughs | Republican | 1856 | Incumbent re-elected. | ▌ ✓ Silas M. Burroughs (Republican) 52.5%; ▌ [FNU] Trott (Democratic) 29.1%; ▌ John H. White (Know Nothing) 18.4% |
| New York 32 | Israel T. Hatch | Democratic | 1856 | Incumbent lost re-election. Republican - Know Nothing gain. | ▌ ✓ Elbridge G. Spaulding (Republican / Know Nothing) 62.2%; ▌ Israel T. Hatch (Democratic) 37.8% |
| New York 33 | Reuben Fenton | Republican | 1856 | Incumbent re-elected. | ▌ ✓ Reuben Fenton (Republican) 60.3%; ▌ [FNU] Jenks (Democratic) 28.4%; ▌ William S. Johnson (Know Nothing) 11.3% |

== North Carolina ==
| District | Incumbent | | | This race | |
| District | Member | Party | First elected | Results | Candidates |
|---|---|---|---|---|---|
| North Carolina 1 | Henry M. Shaw | Democratic | 1857 | Incumbent lost re-election. Opposition gain. | ▌ ✓ William N. H. Smith (Opposition) 52.2%; ▌ Henry M. Shaw (Democratic) 47.8% |
| North Carolina 2 | Thomas H. Ruffin | Democratic | 1853 | Incumbent re-elected. | ▌ ✓ Thomas H. Ruffin (Democratic) 90.2% |
| North Carolina 3 | Warren Winslow | Democratic | 1855 | Incumbent re-elected. | ▌ ✓ Warren Winslow (Democratic) 78.8%; ▌ Malcolm J. McDuffie (Know Nothing) 21.2% |
| North Carolina 4 | Lawrence O'Bryan Branch | Democratic | 1855 | Incumbent re-elected. | ▌ ✓ Lawrence O'Bryan Branch (Democratic) 70.2%; ▌ Linn B. Sanders (Opposition) 29.8% |
| North Carolina 5 | John Adams Gilmer | Know Nothing | 1857 | Incumbent re-elected as an Opposition candidate. Opposition gain. | ▌ ✓ John Adams Gilmer (Opposition) 58.1%; ▌ Stephen E. Williams (Democratic) 41.2% |
| North Carolina 6 | Alfred Moore Scales | Democratic | 1857 | Incumbent lost re-election. Opposition gain. | ▌ ✓ James M. Leach (Opposition) 52.8%; ▌ Alfred Moore Scales (Democratic) 47.2% |
| North Carolina 7 | F. Burton Craige | Democratic | 1853 | Incumbent re-elected. | ▌ ✓ F. Burton Craige (Democratic) 57.4%; ▌ Samuel H. Walkup (Opposition) 42.6% |
| North Carolina 8 | Zebulon Vance | Know Nothing | 1858 (Special) | Incumbent re-elected as an Opposition candidate. Opposition gain. | ▌ ✓ Zebulon Vance (Opposition) 55.9%; ▌ David Coleman (Democratic) 44.1% |

== Ohio ==
Ohio elected its members October 12, 1858, netting a 3-seat Republican gain.

| District | Incumbent | | | This race | |
| District | Member | Party | First elected | Results | Candidates |
|---|---|---|---|---|---|
| Ohio 1 | George H. Pendleton | Democratic | 1856 | Incumbent re-elected. | ▌ ✓ George H. Pendleton (Democratic) 51.24%; ▌Timothy C. Day (Opposition) 48.76% |
| Ohio 2 | William S. Groesbeck | Democratic | 1856 | Incumbent lost re-election. Republican gain. | ▌ ✓ John A. Gurley (Republican) 52.58%; ▌William S. Groesbeck (Democratic) 47.42% |
| Ohio 3 | Clement Vallandigham | Democratic | 1856 (Note: Contested election) | Incumbent re-elected. | ▌ ✓ Clement Vallandigham (Democratic) 50.48%; ▌Lewis D. Campbell (Republican) 49.52% |
| Ohio 4 | Matthias H. Nichols | Republican | 1852 | Incumbent lost re-election. Democratic gain. | ▌ ✓ William Allen (Democratic) 50.2%; ▌Matthias H. Nichols (Republican) 49.8% |
| Ohio 5 | Richard Mott | Republican | 1854 | Incumbent retired. Republican hold. | ▌ ✓ James M. Ashley (Republican) 51.16%; ▌William Mungen (Democratic) 48.51%; ▌William A. Hunter (Unknown) 0.34% (Note: Not mentioned by Smith) |
| Ohio 6 | Joseph R. Cockerill | Democratic | 1856 | Incumbent retired. Democratic hold. | ▌ ✓ William Howard (Democratic) 51.58%; ▌Reader W. Clarke (Republican) 45.82%; ▌William R. Arthur (American) 2.61% |
| Ohio 7 | Aaron Harlan | Republican | 1852 | Incumbent lost renomination. Republican hold. | ▌ ✓ Thomas Corwin (Republican) 63.85%; ▌Charles W. Blair (Democratic) 36.15% |
| Ohio 8 | Benjamin Stanton | Republican | 1854 | Incumbent re-elected. | ▌ ✓ Benjamin Stanton (Republican) 59.52%; ▌William Hubbard (Democratic) 40.48% |
| Ohio 9 | Lawrence W. Hall | Democratic | 1856 | Incumbent lost re-election. Republican gain. | ▌ ✓ John Carey (Republican) 50.29%; ▌Lawrence W. Hall (Democratic) 49.71% |
| Ohio 10 | Joseph Miller | Democratic | 1856 | Incumbent lost re-election. Republican gain. | ▌ ✓ Carey A. Trimble (Republican) 55.04%; ▌Joseph Miller (Democratic) 45.96% |
| Ohio 11 | Albert C. Thompson | Republican | 1854 | Incumbent retired. Democratic gain. | ▌ ✓ Charles D. Martin (Democratic) 50.72%; ▌Nelson H. Van Vorhes (Republican) 49.28% |
| Ohio 12 | Samuel S. Cox | Democratic | 1856 | Incumbent re-elected. | ▌ ✓ Samuel S. Cox (Republican) 51.75%; ▌Lucius Case (Democratic) 48.25% |
| Ohio 13 | John Sherman | Republican | 1854 | Incumbent re-elected. | ▌ ✓ John Sherman (Republican) 57.05%; ▌S. J. Patrick (Democratic) 42.95% |
| Ohio 14 | Philemon Bliss | Republican | 1854 | Incumbent retired. Republican hold. Successor died May 31, 1859, leading to a special election. | ▌ ✓ Cyrus Spink (Republican) 56.33%; ▌J. P. Jeffries (Democratic) 43.67% |
| Ohio 15 | Joseph Burns | Democratic | 1856 | Incumbent lost re-election. Republican gain. | ▌ ✓ William Helmick (Republican) 50.65%; ▌Joseph Burns (Democratic) 49.35% |
| Ohio 16 | Cydnor B. Tompkins | Republican | 1856 | Incumbent re-elected. | ▌ ✓ Cydnor B. Tompkins (Republican) 52.65%; ▌George W. Manypenny (Democratic) 47.01%; ▌Jonathan Swank (Independent) 0.34% |
| Ohio 17 | William Lawrence | Democratic | 1856 | Incumbent retired. Republican gain. | ▌ ✓ Thomas C. Theaker (Republican) 50.32%; ▌Benjamin T. Sprigg (Democratic) 49.68% |
| Ohio 18 | Benjamin F. Leiter | Republican | 1854 | Incumbent retired. Republican hold. | ▌ ✓ Sidney Edgerton (Republican) 53.33%; ▌J. L. Ranney (Democratic) 46.67% |
| Ohio 19 | Edward Wade | Republican | 1852 | Incumbent re-elected. | ▌ ✓ Edward Wade (Republican) 64.57%; ▌J. W. Gray (Democratic) 34.69%; ▌Irad Kelly (Independent) 0.75% |
| Ohio 20 | Joshua Reed Giddings | Republican | 1843 | Incumbent lost renomination. Republican hold. | ▌ ✓ John Hutchins (Republican) 62.8%; ▌David Tod (Democratic) 34.27%; ▌B. W. Richmond (Independent) 2.69%; ▌Josuha R. Giddings (Unknown) 0.24% |
| Ohio 21 | John Bingham | Republican | 1854 | Incumbent re-elected. | ▌ ✓ John Bingham (Republican) 57.46%; ▌Thomas Means (Democratic) 42.54% |

== Oregon ==
=== 35th Congress ===
| District | Incumbent | | | This race | |
| District | Member | Party | First elected | Results | Candidates |
|---|---|---|---|---|---|
| Oregon at-large | New state | | | New seat. New member elected June 7, 1858. Democratic gain. Seated February 15, 1859. New member did not run for the next term. | ▌ ✓ La Fayette Grover (Democratic) 57.9%; ▌ James K. Kelly (Opposition) 41.6% |

=== 36th Congress ===
| District | Incumbent | | | This race | |
| District | Member | Party | First elected | Results | Candidates |
|---|---|---|---|---|---|
| Oregon at-large | New state | | | New seat. Democratic hold. New member did not run for the current term. | ▌ ✓ Lansing Stout (Democratic) 50.07%; ▌David Logan (Republican) 49.93% |

== Pennsylvania ==
| District | Incumbent | | | This race | |
| District | Member | Party | First elected | Results | Candidates |
|---|---|---|---|---|---|
| Pennsylvania 1 | Thomas B. Florence | Democratic | 1850 | Incumbent re-elected. | ▌ ✓ Thomas B. Florence (Democratic) 43.09%; ▌John W. Ryan (People's) 41%; ▌G. W. Nebinger (Anti-Lecompton Dem.) 15.42%; ▌Marshall Sprogell (Know Nothing) 0.48% |
| Pennsylvania 2 | Edward Joy Morris | Republican | 1843; 1844 (retired); 1856 | Incumbent re-elected. | ▌ ✓ Edward Joy Morris (People's) 58.38%; ▌George H. Martin (Democratic) 41.62% |
| Pennsylvania 3 | James Landy | Democratic | 1850 | Incumbent lost re-election. Republican gain. | ▌ ✓ John P. Verree (People's) 54.24%; ▌James Landy (Democratic) 45.35%; ▌George W. Read (Know Nothing) 0.4% |
| Pennsylvania 4 | Henry M. Phillips | Democratic | 1856 | Incumbent lost re-election. Republican gain. | ▌ ✓ William Millward (People's) 59.25%; ▌Henry M. Phillips (Democratic) 39.21%; ▌Jacob Broom (Know Nothing) 1.54% |
| Pennsylvania 5 | Owen Jones | Democratic | 1856 | Incumbent lost re-election. Republican gain. | ▌ ✓ John Wood (People's) 57.37%; ▌Owen Jones (Democratic) 42.63% |
| Pennsylvania 6 | John Hickman | Democratic | 1854 | Incumbent re-elected as an Anti-Lecompton Democratic candidate. Anti-Lecompton Democratic gain. | ▌ ✓ John Hickman (Anti-Lecompton Dem.) 40.76%; ▌Charles D. Manly (Democratic) 31.15%; ▌John M. Broomall (People's) 28.09% |
| Pennsylvania 7 | Henry Chapman | Democratic | 1856 | Incumbent retired. Republican gain. | ▌ ✓ Henry C. Longnecker (People's) 50.76%; ▌Stokes L. Roberts (Democratic) 49.24% |
| Pennsylvania 8 | J. Glancy Jones | Democratic | 1850; 1852 (retired); 1854 (special) | Incumbent lost re-election. Anti-Lecompton Democratic gain. | ▌ ✓ John Schwartz (Anti-Lecompton Dem.) 50.07%; ▌J. Glancy Jones (Democratic) 49.94% |
| Pennsylvania 9 | Anthony E. Roberts | Republican | 1854 | Incumbent retired. Republican hold. | ▌ ✓ Thaddeus Stevens (People's) 60%; ▌James M. Hopkins (Democratic) 40% |
| Pennsylvania 10 | John C. Kunkel | Republican | 1854 | Incumbent retired. Republican hold. | ▌ ✓ John W. Killinger (People's) 61.46%; ▌Jacob Weidle (Democratic) 38.54% |
| Pennsylvania 11 | William L. Dewart | Democratic | 1856 | Incumbent lost re-election. Republican gain. | ▌ ✓ James H. Campbell (People's) 47.2%; ▌William L. Dewart (Democratic) 28.95%; ▌Joseph W. Cake (Anti-Lecompton Dem.) 23.85% |
| Pennsylvania 12 | Paul Leidy | Democratic | 1857 (special) | Incumbent retired. Republican gain. | ▌ ✓ George W. Scranton (People's) 61.89%; ▌John McReynolds (Democratic) 38.11% |
| Pennsylvania 13 | William H. Dimmick | Democratic | 1856 | Incumbent re-elected. | ▌ ✓ William H. Dimmick (Democratic) 54.95%; ▌David K. Shoemaker (People's) 45.05% |
| Pennsylvania 14 | Galusha A. Grow | Republican | 1850 | Incumbent re-elected. | ▌ ✓ Galusha A. Grow (People's) 76.87%; ▌Joel Parkhurst (Democratic) 23.13% |
| Pennsylvania 15 | Allison White | Democratic | 1856 | Incumbent lost re-election. Republican gain. | ▌ ✓ James T. Hale (People's) 55.69%; ▌Allison White (Democratic) 44.31% |
| Pennsylvania 16 | John A. Ahl | Democratic | 1856 | Incumbent retired. Republican gain. | ▌ ✓ Benjamin F. Junkin (People's) 50.13%; ▌Henry L. Fisher (Democratic) 49.87% |
| Pennsylvania 17 | Wilson Reilly | Democratic | 1856 | Incumbent lost re-election. Republican gain. | ▌ ✓ Edward McPherson (People's) 50.72%; ▌Wilson Reilly (Democratic) 49.28% |
| Pennsylvania 18 | John R. Edie | Republican | 1854 | Incumbent retired. Republican hold. | ▌ ✓ Samuel S. Blair (People's) 57.71%; ▌Cyrus L. Pershing (Democratic) 42.29% |
| Pennsylvania 19 | John Covode | Republican | 1854 | Incumbent re-elected. | ▌ ✓ John Covode (People's) 52.81%; ▌Henry D. Foster (Democratic) 47.19% |
| Pennsylvania 20 | William Montgomery | Democratic | 1856 | Incumbent re-elected. | ▌ ✓ William Montgomery (Democratic) 61.5%; ▌Jonathan Knight (People's) 38.5% |
| Pennsylvania 21 | David Ritchie | Republican | 1852 | Incumbent retired. Republican hold. | ▌ ✓ James K. Moorhead (People's) 57.27%; ▌Andrew Burke (Democratic) 42.73% |
| Pennsylvania 22 | Samuel A. Purviance | Republican | 1854 | Incumbent retired. Republican hold. | ▌ ✓ Robert McKnight (People's) 55.25%; ▌Thomas Williams (Anti-Tax) 39.65%; ▌John Birmingham (Democratic) 5.1% |
| Pennsylvania 23 | William Stewart | Republican | 1856 | Incumbent re-elected. | ▌ ✓ William Stewart (People's) 64.02%; ▌Jonathan N. McGuffin (Democratic) 35.98% |
| Pennsylvania 24 | James L. Gillis | Democratic | 1856 | Incumbent lost re-election. Republican gain. | ▌ ✓ Chapin Hall (People's) 52.42%; ▌James L. Gillis (Democratic) 47.58% |
| Pennsylvania 25 | John Dick | Republican | 1852 | Incumbent retired. Republican hold. | ▌ ✓ Elijah Babbitt (People's) 60.73%; ▌ James C. Crawford (Democratic) 39.27% |

== Rhode Island ==
| District | Incumbent | | | This race | |
| District | Member | Party | First elected | Results | Candidates |
|---|---|---|---|---|---|
| Rhode Island 1 | Nathan B. Durfee | Republican | 1855 | Incumbent retired. American/Republican gain. | First round: ▌ Christopher Robinson (American; Republican) 49.29%; ▌ Thomas Davis (Republican) 31.4%; ▌Olney Arnold (Democratic) 19.31%; Runoff: ▌ ✓ Christopher Robinson (American; Republican) 56.32%; ▌Thomas Davis (Republican; Democratic) 43.68% |
| Rhode Island 2 | William D. Brayton | Republican | 1857 | Incumbent re-elected. | ▌ ✓ William D. Brayton (Republican) 63.93%; ▌Alfred Anthony (Democratic) 36.07% |

== South Carolina ==
| District | Incumbent | | | This race | |
| District | Member | Party | First elected | Results | Candidates |
|---|---|---|---|---|---|
| South Carolina 1 | John McQueen | Democratic | 1849 (special) | Incumbent re-elected. | ▌ ✓ John McQueen (Democratic); Incomplete Data |
| South Carolina 2 | William P. Miles | Democratic | 1856 | Incumbent re-elected. | ▌ ✓ William P. Miles (Democratic); ▌James Gadsden (Unknown); Incomplete Data |
| South Carolina 3 | Laurence M. Keitt | Democratic | 1853 (special) | Incumbent re-elected. | ▌ ✓ Laurence M. Keitt; Incomplete Data |
| South Carolina 4 | Milledge L. Bonham | Democratic | 1857 (special) | Incumbent re-elected. | ▌ ✓ Milledge L. Bonham (Democratic) 100.00% |
| South Carolina 5 | James Lawrence Orr | Democratic | 1848 | Incumbent retired. Democratic hold. | ▌ ✓ John D. Ashmore (Democratic) 59.4%; ▌Thomas O. Vernon (Unknown) 40.6% |
| South Carolina 6 | William W. Boyce | Democratic | 1853 | Incumbent re-elected. | ▌ ✓ William W. Boyce (Democratic) 100.00%; Unopposed; incomplete data |

== Tennessee ==
Elections held late, on August 4, 1859.

| District | Incumbent | | | This race | |
| District | Member | Party | First elected | Results | Candidates |
|---|---|---|---|---|---|
| Tennessee 1 | Albert G. Watkins | Democratic | 1855 | Incumbent retired. Opposition gain. | ▌ ✓ Thomas A. R. Nelson (Opposition) 50.19%; ▌Landon C. Haynes (Democratic) 49.81% |
| Tennessee 2 | Horace Maynard | Know Nothing | 1857 | Incumbent re-elected as an Oppositionist. Opposition gain. | ▌ ✓ Horace Maynard (Opposition) 55.01%; ▌I. C. Ramsay (Democratic) 44.99% |
| Tennessee 3 | Samuel A. Smith | Democratic | 1853 | Incumbent lost re-election. Opposition gain. | ▌ ✓ Reese B. Brabson (Opposition) 53.39%; ▌Samuel A. Smith (Democratic) 46.61% |
| Tennessee 4 | John H. Savage | Democratic | 1855 | Incumbent lost re-election. Opposition gain. | ▌ ✓ William B. Stokes (Opposition) 51.85%; ▌John H. Savage (Democratic) 48.15% |
| Tennessee 5 | Charles Ready | Know Nothing | 1853 | Incumbent lost re-election as an independent. Opposition gain. | ▌ ✓ Robert H. Hatton (Opposition) 53.48%; ▌Charles Ready (Independent; Democratic) 46.52% |
| Tennessee 6 | George W. Jones | Democratic | 1842 | Incumbent retired. Democratic hold. | ▌ ✓ James H. Thomas (Democratic) 97.82%; ▌William H. Polk (Unknown) 2.18% |
| Tennessee 7 | John V. Wright | Democratic | 1855 | Incumbent re-elected. | ▌ ✓ John V. Wright (Democratic) 77.58%; ▌Theodore H. Gibbs (Opposition) 22.42% |
| Tennessee 8 | Felix Zollicoffer | Know Nothing | 1853 | Incumbent retired. Opposition gain. | ▌ ✓ James M. Quarles (Opposition) 52.86%; ▌Thomas Menees (Democratic) 47.14% |
| Tennessee 9 | John D. C. Atkins | Democratic | 1857 | Incumbent lost re-election. Opposition gain. | ▌ ✓ Emerson Etheridge (Opposition) 50.02%; ▌John D. C. Atkins (Democratic) 49.98% |
| Tennessee 10 | William T. Avery | Democratic | 1857 | Incumbent re-elected. | ▌ ✓ William T. Avery (Democratic) 50.3%; ▌John L. Sneed (Opposition) 47.71%; ▌David M. Currin (Independent) 1.99% |

== Texas ==
| District | Incumbent | | | This race | |
| District | Member | Party | First elected | Results | Candidates |
|---|---|---|---|---|---|
| Texas 1 | John H. Reagan | Democratic | 1857 | Incumbent re-elected. | ▌ ✓ John H. Reagan (Democratic) 89.11%; ▌William Beck Ochiltree (Independent) 10.89% |
| Texas 2 | Guy M. Bryan | Democratic | 1857 | Incumbent retired. Independent Democratic gain. | ▌ ✓ Andrew Jackson Hamilton (Ind. Democratic) 51.18%; ▌Thomas Neville Waul (Democratic) 48.82% |

== Vermont ==
| District | Incumbent | | | This race | |
| District | Member | Party | First elected | Results | Candidates |
|---|---|---|---|---|---|
| Vermont 1 | E. P. Walton | Republican | 1856 | Incumbent re-elected. | ▌ ✓ E. P. Walton (Republican) 73.5%; ▌Charles G. Eastman (Democratic) 26.0% |
| Vermont 2 | Justin S. Morrill | Republican | 1854 | Incumbent re-elected. | ▌ ✓ Justin S. Morrill (Republican) 70.5%; ▌Epaphro B. Chase (Democratic) 29.2% |
| Vermont 3 | Homer E. Royce | Republican | 1856 | Incumbent re-elected. | ▌ ✓ Homer E. Royce (Republican) 69.3%; ▌W. H. H. Bingham (Democratic) 30.6% |

== Virginia ==
| District | Incumbent | | | This race | |
| District | Member | Party | First elected | Results | Candidates |
|---|---|---|---|---|---|
| Virginia 1 | Muscoe R. H. Garnett | Democratic | 1856 (special) | Incumbent re-elected. | ▌ ✓ Muscoe R. H. Garnett (Democratic) 100% |
| Virginia 2 | John Millson | Democratic | 1849 | Incumbent re-elected. | ▌ ✓ John Millson (Democratic) 62.7%; ▌[FNU] Pretlow (Opposition) 30.1%; ▌[FNU] Chandler (Opposition) 5.2%; ▌[FNU] Sykes (Opposition) 2.0% |
| Virginia 3 | John Caskie | Democratic | 1851 | Incumbent lost re-election. Independent Democratic gain. | ▌ ✓ Daniel C. DeJarnette (Ind. Democratic) 50.5%; ▌John Caskie (Democratic) 49.5% |
| Virginia 4 | William Goode | Democratic | 1841; 1843 (retired); 1853 | Incumbent re-elected. | ▌ ✓ William Goode (Democratic) 63.8%; ▌William C. Flournoy (Ind. Democratic) 36.2% |
| Virginia 5 | Thomas S. Bocock | Democratic | 1847 | Incumbent re-elected. | ▌ ✓ Thomas S. Bocock (Democratic) 88.8%; ▌[FNU] Speed (Unknown) 9.9%; ▌[FNU] Boisseau (Unknown) 1.4% |
| Virginia 6 | Paulus Powell | Democratic | 1849 | Incumbent lost re-election. Independent Democratic gain. | ▌ ✓ Shelton Leake (Ind. Democratic) 59.2%; ▌Paulus Powell (Democratic) 40.8% |
| Virginia 7 | William Smith | Democratic | 1841 (special); 1843 (lost); 1853 | Incumbent re-elected. | ▌ ✓ William Smith (Democratic) 49.4%; ▌Henry Wirtz Thomas (Opposition) 46.5%; ▌Henry Shackleford (Ind. Democratic) 4.2% |
| Virginia 8 | Charles J. Faulkner | Democratic | 1851 | Incumbent lost re-election. Opposition gain. | ▌ ✓ Alexander Boteler (Opposition) 50.6%; ▌Charles J. Faulkner (Democratic) 49.4% |
| Virginia 9 | John Letcher | Democratic | 1851 | Incumbent retired. Independent Democratic gain. | ▌ ✓ John T. Harris (Ind. Democratic) 52.2%; ▌James H. Skinner (Democratic) 47.8% |
| Virginia 10 | Sherrard Clemens | Democratic | 1852 (special); 1852 (retired); 1857 | Incumbent re-elected. | ▌ ✓ Sherrard Clemens (Democratic) 61.1%; ▌Ralph L. Berkshire (Opposition) 38.9% |
| Virginia 11 | Albert G. Jenkins | Democratic | 1857 | Incumbent re-elected. | ▌ ✓ Albert G. Jenkins (Democratic) 55.6%; ▌James M. Laidley (Opposition) 44.4% |
| Virginia 12 | Henry A. Edmundson | Democratic | 1849 | Incumbent re-elected. | ▌ ✓ Henry A. Edmundson (Democratic) 94.1%; ▌William B. Preston (Opposition) 5.0%; ▌Allen T. Caperton (Democratic) 1.0% |
| Virginia 13 | George W. Hopkins | Democratic | 1835; 1847 (retired); 1857 | Incumbent retired. Independent Democratic gain. | ▌ ✓ Elbert S. Martin (Ind. Democratic) 53.4%; ▌Benjamin Rush Floyd (Democratic) 46.6% |

== Wisconsin ==
| District | Incumbent | | | This race | |
| District | Member | Party | First elected | Results | Candidates |
|---|---|---|---|---|---|
| Wisconsin 1 | John F. Potter | Republican | 1856 | Incumbent re-elected. | ▌ ✓ John F. Potter (Republican) 56.4%; ▌Beriah Brown (Democratic) 43.6% |
| Wisconsin 2 | Cadwallader C. Washburn | Republican | 1854 | Incumbent re-elected. | ▌ ✓ Cadwallader C. Washburn (Republican) 54.3%; ▌Charles Dunn (Democratic) 45.7% |
| Wisconsin 3 | Charles Billinghurst | Republican | 1854 | Incumbent lost re-election. Democratic gain. | ▌ ✓ Charles H. Larrabee (Democratic) 51.0%; ▌Charles Billinghurst (Republican) 49.0% |

== Non-voting delegates ==
| District | Incumbent | | | This race | |
| District | Delegate | Party | First elected | Results | Candidates |
|---|---|---|---|---|---|
| Kansas | Marcus J. Parrott | Republican | 1856 or 1857 | Incumbent re-elected in 1859. | ▌ ✓ Marcus J. Parrott (Republican); ▌Sanders W. Johnston (Democratic) |
| Nebraska | Fenner Ferguson | Independent; Democratic | 1857 | Incumbent retired. New delegate elected October 11, 1859. Democratic gain. Election was later overturned due to a successful challenge by Daily. | ▌ ✓ Experience Estabrook (Democratic); ▌Samuel Gordon Daily (Republican) |

== See also ==
- 1858 United States elections
  - 1858–59 United States Senate elections
- 35th United States Congress
- 36th United States Congress

== Bibliography ==
- Dubin, Michael J. (March 1, 1998). United States Congressional Elections, 1788-1997: The Official Results of the Elections of the 1st Through 105th Congresses. McFarland and Company. ISBN 978-0786402830.
- Martis, Kenneth C. (January 1, 1989). The Historical Atlas of Political Parties in the United States Congress, 1789-1989. Macmillan Publishing Company. ISBN 978-0029201701.
- McPherson, James M. (1988). Battle Cry of Freedom: The Civil War Era. New York: Oxford University Press.
- Moore, John L., ed. (1994). Congressional Quarterly's Guide to U.S. Elections (Third ed.). Congressional Quarterly Inc. ISBN 978-0871879967.
- "Party Divisions of the House of Representatives* 1789–Present". Office of the Historian, House of United States House of Representatives.
- Auman, William T. (January 23, 2014). Civil War in the North Carolina Quaker Belt: The Confederate Campaign Against Peace Agitators, Deserters and Draft Dodgers. McFarland and Company. ISBN 9781476612997.
