= William Paine Sheffield Sr. =

American politician

- Portrait of Sheffield taken by Mathew Brady

United States Senator from Rhode Island
- In office November 19, 1884 – January 20, 1885
- Appointed by: Augustus O. Bourn
- Preceded by: Henry B. Anthony
- Succeeded by: Jonathan Chace

Member of the U.S. House of Representatives from Rhode Island's 1st district
- In office March 4, 1861 – March 3, 1863
- Preceded by: Christopher Robinson
- Succeeded by: Thomas Jenckes

Member of the Rhode Island House of Representatives
- In office 1842–1845; 1849–1853; 1857–1861; 1875–1884

Personal details
- Born: August 30, 1820 New Shoreham, Rhode Island, U.S.
- Died: June 2, 1907 (aged 86) Newport, Rhode Island, U.S.
- Party: Republican; Constitutional Union (1861–63)
- Education: Harvard Law School
- Profession: Attorney

William Paine Sheffield (August 30, 1820 – June 2, 1907) was a U.S. representative and senator from Rhode Island.

== Biography ==
Born in New Shoreham (on Block Island), he completed preparatory studies, attended Kingston Academy, and graduated from Harvard Law School in 1843. He was admitted to the bar in 1844 and commenced practice in Newport. In 1841 and 1842 he was a delegate to the State constitutional conventions and was a member of the Rhode Island House of Representatives from 1842 to 1845, from 1849 to 1853, and from 1857 to 1861. He moved to Tiverton and returned to Newport.

Sheffield was elected as a Constitutional Union candidate to the 37th United States Congress, serving from 1861 to 1863. Following the end of his term, he resumed the practice of law.

He was appointed one of the commissioners to revise the state laws in 1871 and served as a member of the Rhode Island House of Representatives from 1875 to 1884. He was appointed as a Republican to the United States Senate to fill the vacancy caused by the death of Henry B. Anthony and served from November 19, 1884, to January 20, 1885.

Sheffield was elected as an honorary member of the Rhode Island Society of the Cincinnati in 1892.

Sheffield died in Newport in 1907 and was interred in Island Cemetery.

Sheffield was the father of William Paine Sheffield Jr., also a U.S. Representative from Rhode Island.

== Bibliography ==
- United States Congress. "William Paine Sheffield (id: S000319)". Biographical Directory of the United States Congress.

U.S. House of Representatives
Preceded by Christopher Robinson	Member of the U.S. House of Representatives for Rhode Island's 1st district March 4, 1861 – March 3, 1863	Succeeded by Thomas Jenckes
U.S. Senate
Preceded by Henry B. Anthony	U.S. senator (Class 2) from Rhode Island; 1884–1885; Served alongside: Nelson W. Aldrich	Succeeded by Jonathan Chace
