= George Gordon King =

American politician

Member of the U.S. House of Representatives from Rhode Island's 1st district
- In office March 4, 1849 – March 3, 1853
- Preceded by: Robert B. Cranston
- Succeeded by: Thomas Davis

Member of the Rhode Island House of Representatives
- In office 1845–1846

Personal details
- Born: June 9, 1807 Newport, Rhode Island
- Died: July 17, 1870 (aged 63) Newport, Rhode Island
- Resting place: Island Cemetery
- Party: Whig
- Education: Phillips Academy
- Alma mater: Brown University; Litchfield Law School

George Gordon King (June 9, 1807 – July 17, 1870) was a U.S. representative from Rhode Island.

== Early life ==
King was born in Newport, Rhode Island, on June 9, 1807. He was the eldest son of Dr. David King Sr. (1774–1836), and his wife, whose maiden name was Gordon. His three younger brothers were David King Jr., Edward King, and William Henry King (who owned Kingscote mansion in Newport), who each made large fortunes as traders by going to China with Russell & Company. His nephew and namesake, George Gordon King, was married to Annie McKenzie Coats, the daughter of Sir James Coats, 1st Bt. and Sarah Ann (née Auchincloss) Coats.

King pursued classical studies in Newport and at Phillips Academy in Andover, Massachusetts. He graduated from Brown University in 1825. He attended the Litchfield Law School in Connecticut.

== Career ==
He was admitted to the bar in 1827 and practiced in Providence and Newport.

He served as member and speaker of the State house of representatives in 1845 and 1846. King was elected as a Whig to the Thirty-first and Thirty-second Congresses from March 4, 1849, until March 3, 1853, as he was an unsuccessful candidate for reelection.

== Personal life ==
King died in Newport, Rhode Island, on July 17, 1870. He was interred in Island Cemetery.

U.S. House of Representatives
Preceded by Robert B. Cranston	Member of the U.S. House of Representatives from Rhode Island's 1st congressional district March 4, 1849 – March 3, 1853	Succeeded by Thomas Davis
