= John Robbins (politician) =

American politician (1808-1880)

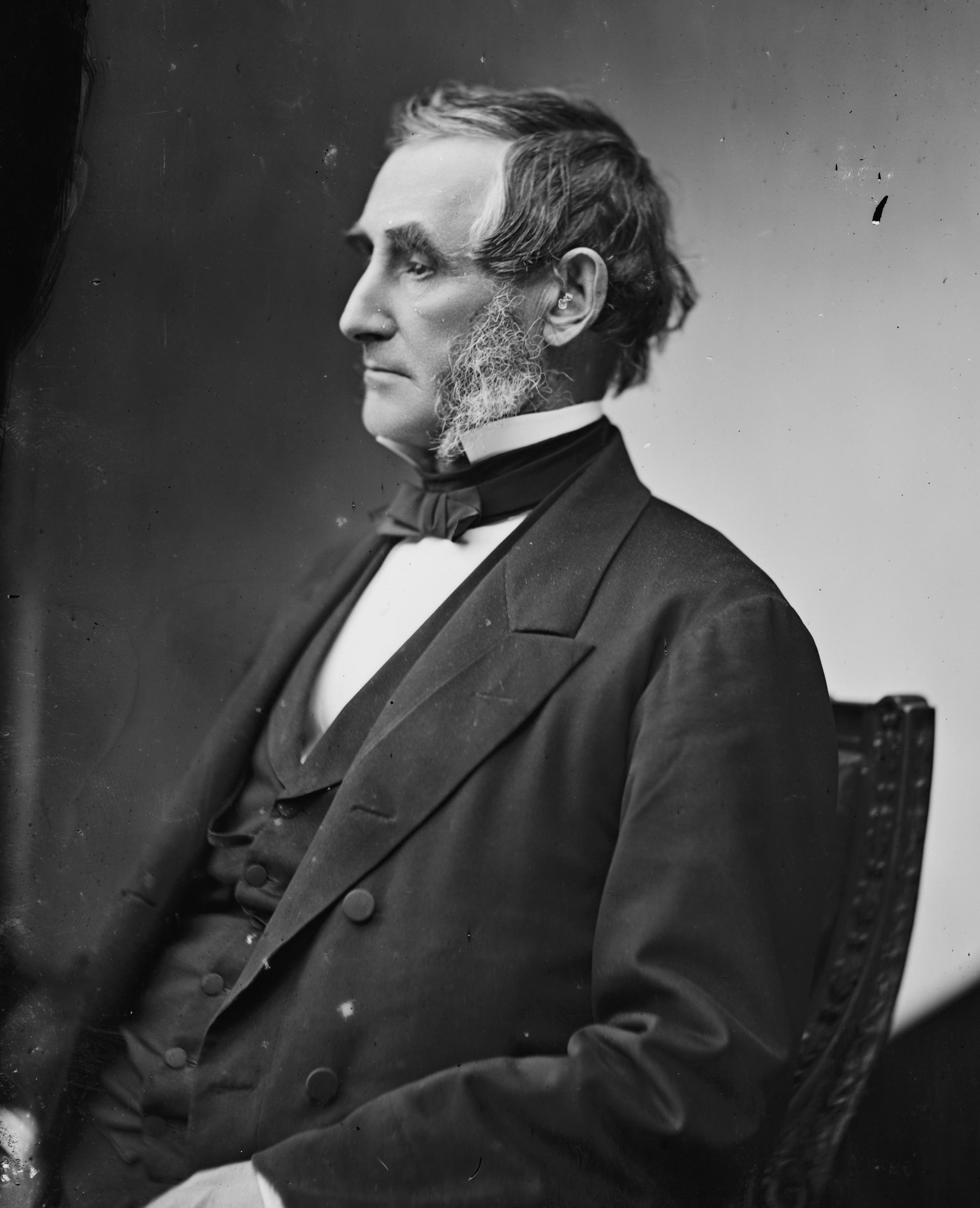

Member of the U.S. House of Representatives from Pennsylvania
- In office March 4, 1849 – March 3, 1855
- Preceded by: Charles J. Ingersoll (4th); Henry D. Moore (3rd)
- Succeeded by: William H. Witte (4th); William Millward (3rd)
- Constituency: 4th district (1849-53); 3rd district (1853-55)
- In office March 4, 1875 – March 3, 1877
- Preceded by: Alfred C. Harmer
- Succeeded by: Alfred C. Harmer
- Constituency: 5th district

Personal details
- Born: 1808 Bustleton, Pennsylvania, U.S.
- Died: April 27, 1880 (aged 71–72) Philadelphia, Pennsylvania, U.S.
- Resting place: Laurel Hill Cemetery, Philadelphia, Pennsylvania, U.S.
- Party: Democratic Party
- Spouse: Tacy W. Robbins
- Education: Gunmere Academy
- Profession: banker, steel manufacturer, politician

John Robbins (1808 – April 27, 1880) was an American politician who served as a Democratic member of the U.S. House of Representatives for Pennsylvania's 4th congressional district from 1849 to 1853, Pennsylvania's 3rd congressional district from 1853 to 1855, and Pennsylvania's 5th congressional district from 1875 to 1877.

== Early life and education ==
John Robbins was born in Bustleton, Pennsylvania, (now a part of Philadelphia), and raised on his father's farm. He was a student at the Gunmere Academy in Burlington, New Jersey.

== Business career ==
He moved to Philadelphia in 1836 and engaged in the manufacture of steel. He served as a director of the Kensington National Bank and as president from 1863 to 1864.

== Political career ==
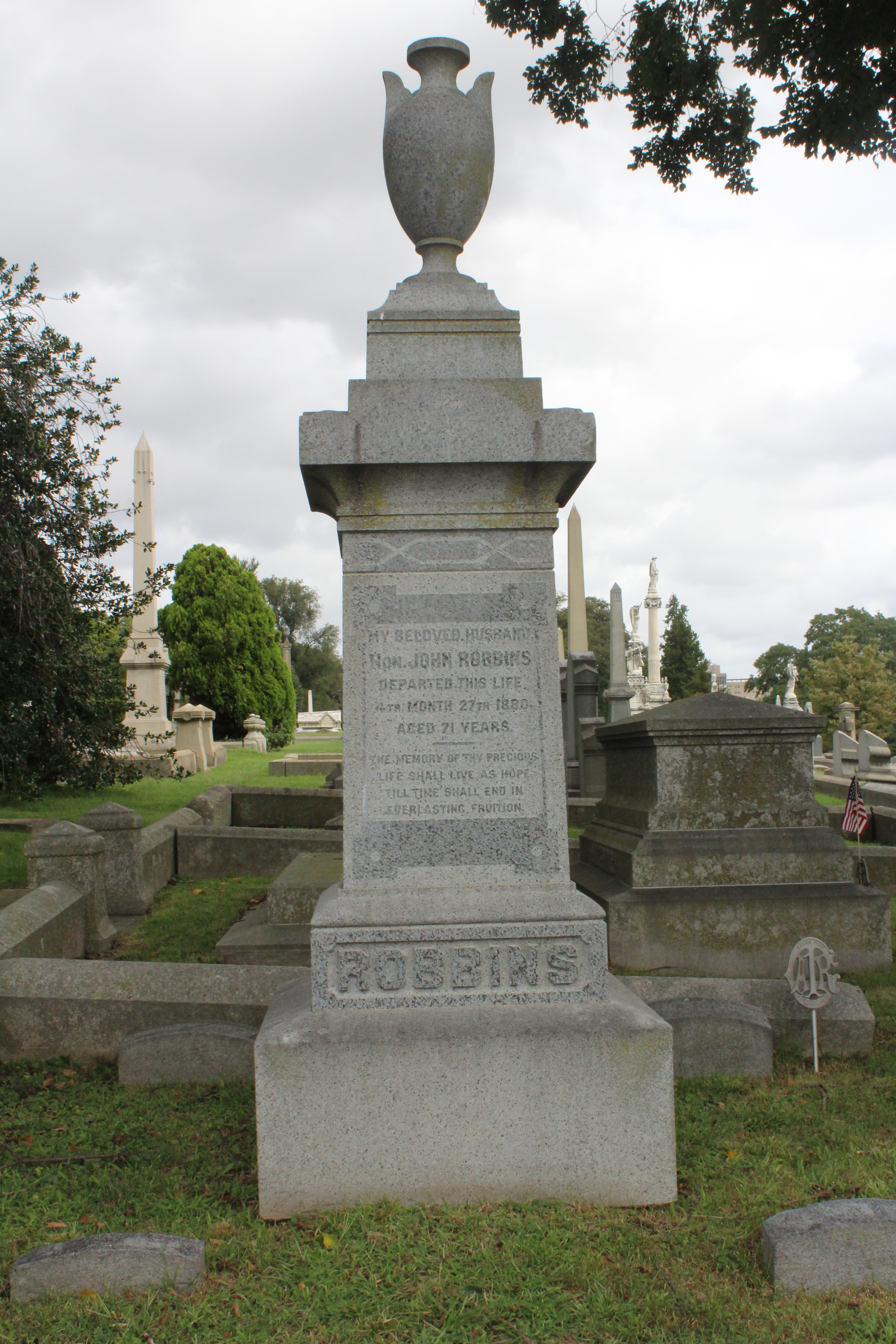
John Robbins tombstone in Laurel Hill Cemetery, Philadelphia

He served as a member of the board of education and as a member and president of the board of commissioners of the district of Kensington, Pennsylvania.

Robbins was elected as a Democrat to the Thirty-first, Thirty-second congresses, representing the fourth district of Pennsylvania from March 4, 1849, to March 3, 1853; and to the Thirty-third Congress representing the third district from March 4, 1853, to March 3, 1855. In 1850, he voted in favor of the Fugitive Slave Act. He declined to be a candidate for renomination in 1854, and was an unsuccessful candidate for the office of the Mayor of Philadelphia in 1860.

He worked as an inspector of Moyamensing Prison, a Guardian of the Poor at Blockley Almshouse, a Director of Girard College, and a manager of the House of Correction and the House of Refuge.

Again elected to the Forty-fourth Congress, for the fifth district, Robbins served from March 4, 1875, to March 3, 1877; but declined to be a candidate for renomination in 1876.

He died in Philadelphia, on April 27, 1880, and was interred at Laurel Hill Cemetery.

U.S. House of Representatives
Preceded by Charles J. Ingersoll	Member of the U.S. House of Representatives from Pennsylvania's 4th congressional district March 4, 1849 – March 3, 1853	Succeeded by William H. Witte
Preceded by Henry D. Moore	Member of the U.S. House of Representatives from Pennsylvania's 3rd congressional district March 4, 1853 – March 3, 1855	Succeeded by William Millward
Preceded by Alfred C. Harmer	Member of the U.S. House of Representatives from Pennsylvania's 5th congressional district March 4, 1875 – March 3, 1877	Succeeded by Alfred C. Harmer
