= William H. Witte =

American journalist

William Henry Witte (October 4, 1817 – November 24, 1876) was a Democratic member of the U.S. House of Representatives from Pennsylvania.

William H. Witte was born in the Columbia section of Knowlton Township, New Jersey. He moved to Springtown, Bucks County, Pennsylvania. He moved to Philadelphia in 1840, and engaged in mercantile pursuits and the real estate business.

Witte was elected as a Democrat to the Thirty-third Congress. He was engaged in newspaper work and resumed real estate interests. He died in Philadelphia in 1876. Interment in Durham Cemetery in Durham Township, Pennsylvania.

== Sources ==
- United States Congress. "William H. Witte (id: W000664)". Biographical Directory of the United States Congress.
- The Political Graveyard

U.S. House of Representatives
Preceded by John Robbins	Member of the U.S. House of Representatives from Pennsylvania's 4th congressional district 1853–1855	Succeeded by Jacob Broom
