= William Millward =

American politician (1822–1871)

Member of the U.S. House of Representatives from Pennsylvania's 3rd district
- In office March 4, 1855 – March 3, 1857
- Preceded by: John Robbins
- Succeeded by: James Landy

Member of the U.S. House of Representatives from Pennsylvania's 4th district
- In office March 4, 1859 – March 3, 1861
- Preceded by: Henry M. Phillips
- Succeeded by: William D. Kelley

Director of the United States Mint
- In office October 1, 1866 – April 1, 1867
- President: Andrew Johnson
- Preceded by: James Pollock
- Succeeded by: Henry Linderman

Personal details
- Born: June 30, 1822 Philadelphia, Pennsylvania, U.S.
- Died: November 28, 1871 (aged 49) Kirkwood, Delaware, U.S.
- Resting place: Laurel Hill Cemetery, Philadelphia, Pennsylvania, U.S.
- Party: Whig; Republican
- Profession: leather manufacturer; politician

William Millward (June 30, 1822 – November 28, 1871) was an American politician who served as a Whig member of the United States House of Representatives for Pennsylvania's 3rd congressional district from 1855 to 1857, and as a Republican member for Pennsylvania's 4th congressional district from 1859 to 1861. He served as marshal for the United States District Court for the Eastern District of Pennsylvania from 1861 to 1865 and as Director of the United States Mint from October 1866 to April 1867.

== Early life and education ==
Millward was born on June 30, 1822, in the Northern Liberties neighborhood in Philadelphia, Pennsylvania. He attended the public schools and was engaged in the manufacture of leather.

== Career ==
He was elected as a Whig Party candidate to the Thirty-fourth Congress, and served as United States representative from Pennsylvania's 3rd congressional district from March 4, 1855, to March 4, 1857. He was an unsuccessful candidate for reelection in 1856, but was elected as a Republican in 1858 and served as U.S. representative from Pennsylvania's 4th congressional district from March 4, 1859, to March 4, 1861. During that term, he was chairman of the United States House Committee on Patents.

Appointed by President Abraham Lincoln, Millward served as marshal for the United States District Court for the Eastern District of Pennsylvania from 1861 to 1865, confiscating and destroying Democratic newspapers from trains, post offices, and ships in port. He was involved in the Marshal's sale of the British brig Ariel which was captured by the Atlantic Blockading Squadron during the American Civil War and sold at auction.

He was appointed Director of the United States Mint in September 1866 by President Andrew Johnson, however his appointment was not confirmed by the United States Senate and he served only six months from October 1866 to April 1867.

Millward died in Kirkwood, Delaware, on November 28, 1871 and he was interred at Laurel Hill Cemetery in Philadelphia.

U.S. House of Representatives
Preceded by John Robbins	Member of the U.S. House of Representatives from Pennsylvania's 3rd congressional district 1855–1857	Succeeded by James Landy
Preceded by Henry Myer Phillips	Member of the U.S. House of Representatives from Pennsylvania's 4th congressional district 1859–1861	Succeeded by William D. Kelley
Government offices
Preceded by James Pollock	Director of the United States Mint; October 1866 – April 1867	Succeeded by Henry Linderman
