= Henry M. Phillips =

American politician

Henry Myer Phillips
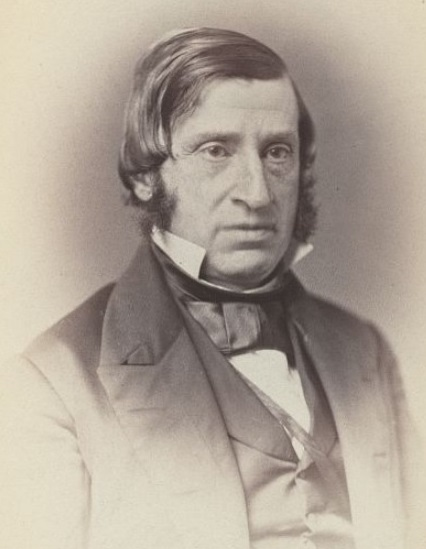

Member of the U.S. House of Representatives from Pennsylvania's 4th district
- In office March 4, 1857 – March 3, 1859
- Preceded by: Jacob Broom
- Succeeded by: William Millward

Personal details
- Born: June 30, 1811 Philadelphia, Pennsylvania, U.S.
- Died: August 28, 1884 (aged 73) Philadelphia, Pennsylvania, U.S.
- Party: Democratic

Henry Myer Phillips (June 30, 1811 – August 28, 1884) was a Democratic member of the U.S. House of Representatives from Pennsylvania. He was Pennsylvania's second Jewish congressman.

== Life ==
Phillips was born in Philadelphia. He attended the Philadelphia schools and Franklin Institute. He studied law, was admitted to the bar in 1832 and commenced practice in Philadelphia. He served as clerk of the Philadelphia County Court of Common Pleas.

Phillips was elected as a Democrat to the Thirty-fifth Congress. He was an unsuccessful candidate for reelection in 1858. He was a delegate to the 1860 Democratic National Convention.

He resumed the practice of law in Philadelphia. Mitchell was a freemason and served as grand master of the Grand Lodge of Pennsylvania from 1859 to 1860. He served as a trustee of Jefferson Medical College in 1862. He was appointed a member of the Board of Fairmount Park Commissioners in 1867 and elected its president in 1881. He was a member of the Board of City Trusts in 1869, vice president of the board 1870–1878, and president 1878–1882. He served as a director of the Academy of Music in 1870 and its president in 1872, resigning in 1884. He was elected as a member to the American Philosophical Society in 1871.

Phillips was a member of the commission to supervise the erection of the municipal buildings in Philadelphia in 1870, resigning in 1871. He was a director of the Pennsylvania Railroad Company in 1874.

== Death ==
Phillips died in Philadelphia in 1884 and interment was in Mount Sinai Cemetery in Frankford, Philadelphia, Pennsylvania. Henry M. Phillips Masonic Lodge #337 in Monongahela, PA is named in his honor.

== See also ==
- List of Jewish members of the United States Congress

== Sources ==
- United States Congress. "Henry M. Phillips (id: P000308)". Biographical Directory of the United States Congress.
- The Political Graveyard

U.S. House of Representatives
| Preceded by Jacob Broom | Member of the U.S. House of Representatives from Pennsylvania's 4th congressional district 1857–1859 | Succeeded by William Millward |
