= Sanders W. Johnston =

American judge (1820-1905)

Sanders Walker Johnston (December 10, 1820 - January 1, 1905) was an American attorney and jurist who served as an associate judge of the Supreme Court of the Kansas Territory.

== Early life and education ==
Johnston was born in Mason County, Kentucky on December 10, 1820. He studied law with Thomas L. Hamer, who eventually served in the U.S. House of Representatives, and was admitted to the bar in 1843.

During the Mexican-American War, Johnston became captain of Company G of the First Regiment of Ohio Volunteers and served during the Battle of Monterey.

== Career ==
Johnston was elected to the Ohio State Senate in 1851, as a member of the Democratic Party representing Clermont and Brown counties.

In 1854, Johnston was appointed by President Franklin Pierce to become an associate judge of the newly formed Supreme Court of the Kansas Territory. Johnston, along with chief judge Samuel Dexter Lecompte and associate judge Rush Elmore, all held pro-slavery views.

In 1855, Pierce removed Johnston, Elmore, and then-Governor Andrew Horatio Reeder after accusations were made against them for illegally purchasing Native American land. Johnston was replaced by Jeremiah Burrell. Johnston entered into private practice in Leavenworth, Kansas.

Johnston was the Democratic nominee for Kansas's non-voting delegate seat in the 1859 House of Representatives elections. He ran against the Republican nominee, Marcus Junius Parrott; Parrott won the election.

== Later life and death ==
Johnston moved to Washington, D.C. during the Civil War, and lived there until his death from pneumonia on January 1, 1905. He was buried in Arlington National Cemetery.
