= Alfred C. Harmer =

American politician (1825–1900)

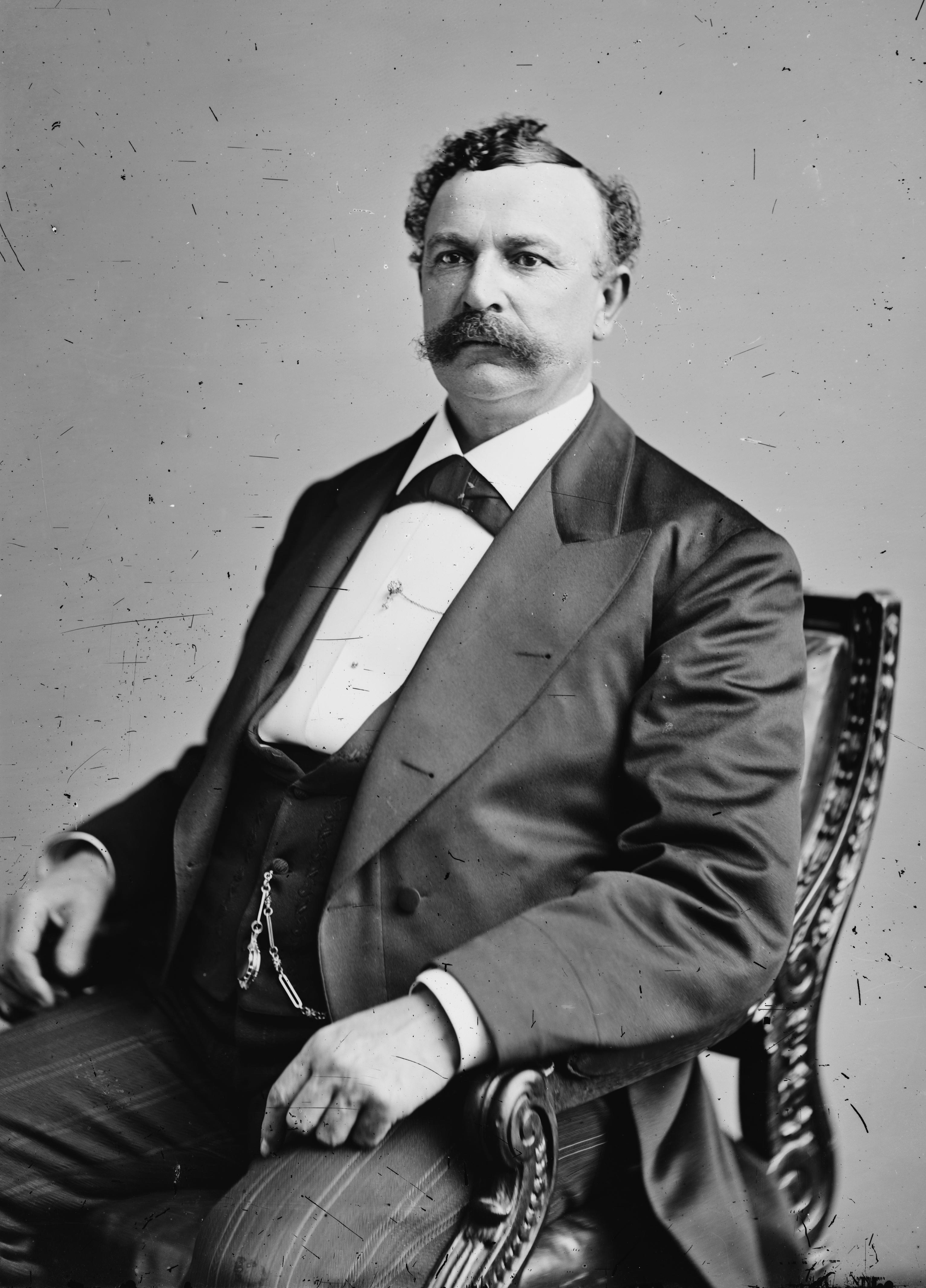

Member of the U.S. House of Representatives from Pennsylvania's 5th district
- In office March 4, 1877 – March 6, 1900
- Preceded by: John Robbins
- Succeeded by: Edward de Veaux Morrell
- In office March 4, 1871 – March 3, 1875
- Preceded by: Caleb Newbold Taylor
- Succeeded by: John Robbins

Personal details
- Born: August 8, 1825 Philadelphia, Pennsylvania, U.S.
- Died: March 6, 1900 (aged 74) Philadelphia, Pennsylvania, U.S.
- Resting place: West Laurel Hill Cemetery; Bala Cynwyd, Pennsylvania, U.S.
- Party: Republican

Alfred Crout Harmer (August 8, 1825 – March 6, 1900) was an American politician who served as a Republican member of the United States House of Representatives for Pennsylvania's 5th congressional district from 1871 to 1875 and 1877 to 1900.

== Early life and education ==
Harmer was born August 8, 1825, in the Germantown neighborhood of Philadelphia. He attended public schools and Germantown Academy. He worked as a shoe manufacturer and a wholesale dealer until 1860. He served as president of the Thirteenth and Fifteenth Streets Railway Company for three years and served as a director of the North Pennsylvania Railroad. He was also involved in shipping and the coal industry.

== Career ==
He won election as a director of the public schools in Germantown. He served as a member of the Philadelphia City Council, from 1856 to 1860 and as recorder of deeds for Philadelphia from 1860 to 1863. He was a delegate to the 1868 Republican National Convention.

He was elected as a Republican in 1870 for and served two terms. He was defeated in 1874, but was elected again in 1876. He served on the Committee for Naval Affairs; the Committee on the District of Columbia; Committee on the Pacific Railroad; Committee on Indian Affairs; Committee on Coinage, Weights, and Measures; and as chairman of the Committee on the Library. He served until his death March 6, 1900, and was interred in West Laurel Hill Cemetery in Bala Cynwyd, Pennsylvania.

== Personal life ==
He married Lizzie Miller from Mauch Chunk, Pennsylvania, and together they had eight sons and two daughters.

== See also ==
- List of members of the United States Congress who died in office (1900–1949)

U.S. House of Representatives
Preceded by Caleb Newbold Taylor	Member of the U.S. House of Representatives from Pennsylvania's 5th congressional district 1871–1875	Succeeded by John Robbins
Preceded by John Robbins	Member of the U.S. House of Representatives from Pennsylvania's 5th congressional district 1877–1900	Succeeded by Edward de Veaux Morrell
