= William D. Kelley =

American politician (1814–1890)

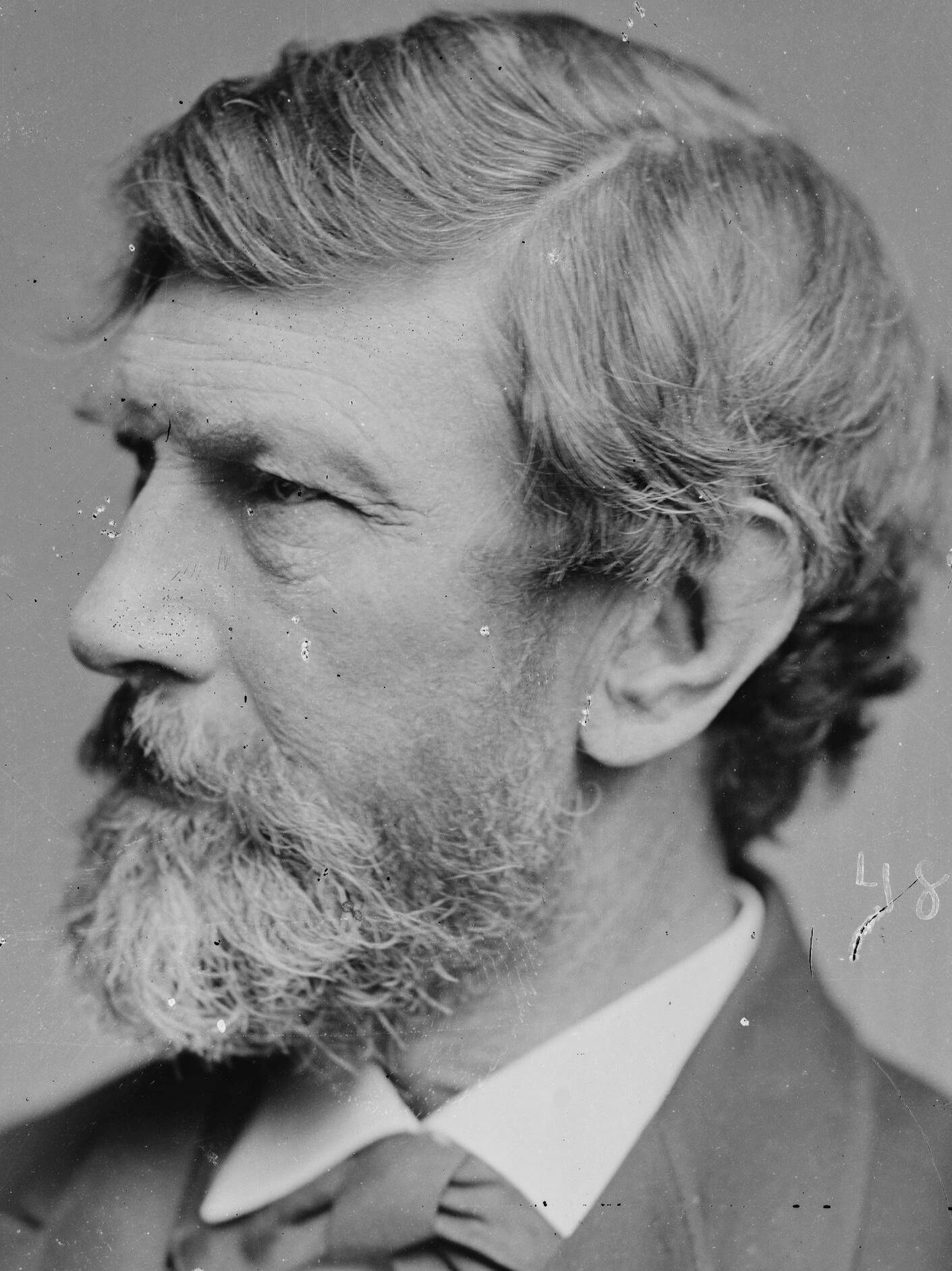
- Kelley, 1870–1880

Member of the U.S. House of Representatives from Pennsylvania's 4th district
- In office March 4, 1861 – January 9, 1890
- Preceded by: William Millward
- Succeeded by: John E. Reyburn

Personal details
- Born: April 12, 1814 Philadelphia, Pennsylvania, US
- Died: January 9, 1890 (aged 75) Washington, D.C., US
- Resting place: Laurel Hill Cemetery, Philadelphia, Pennsylvania
- Party: Democratic (until 1854); Republican (from 1854)
- Spouse: Caroline Bartram-Bonsall
- Children: Elizabeth; Florence; Marian; Josephine; Anna Kelley; William Darrah, Jr. Albert Bartram; Caroline
- Profession: Proofreader; Jeweler; Attorney; Judge; Legislator

William Darrah Kelley (April 12, 1814 – January 9, 1890) was an American politician from Philadelphia who served as a Republican member of the U.S. House of Representatives for Pennsylvania's 4th congressional district from 1861 to 1890.

He was an abolitionist, a friend of Abraham Lincoln and one of the founders of the Republican Party in 1854. He advocated for the recruitment of black troops in the American Civil War, and the extension of voting rights to them afterwards. His belief in protective tariffs was so extreme that he refused to wear a single imported garment.

== Early life ==
William Darrah Kelley was born in Philadelphia, Pennsylvania, the son of Hannah and David Kelley; his father died when he was two. David Kelley had been a watch and clock-maker, and later in life William Kelley bought one of those clocks to adorn his library. William Kelley's daughter Florence later told of an incident that had occurred immediately after David Kelley's death. Since the law at the time said that all a man's possessions must be sold to discharge his debts, with no exemptions allowed for widows or orphans, all of the family's treasures were spread out on tables to be auctioned off. A "substantial" Quaker woman appeared with two large baskets, claimed that several items up for auction were hers, filled the baskets with as many as she could carry, and then departed while expressing mock indignation that Hannah Kelley had not previously returned these "borrowed" items. After the auction the woman returned the items to the Kelley family.

== Career ==
His mother opened a boarding house to support her children.

As a boy Kelley began working as an errand boy in a Philadelphia bookstore, a position which led to a position as proofreader with The Philadelphia Inquirer. He later apprenticed as a jeweler, and served in the State Fencibles, a militia unit commanded by Colonel John Page, a prominent attorney. Kelley then worked as a journeyman jeweler in Boston, Massachusetts for several years. Upon returning to Philadelphia, Kelley began the study of law in Page's office. Kelley was admitted to the bar in Philadelphia in 1841.

Later, a reporter described Kelley in the United States House as "slightly noticeable for the disfigurement of the lid of one of his eyes, received in a machine shop in which his youth was educated -- a man who literally hammered his way up in life, and who is capable of hammering his representative way through life, on whatsoever paths social tyranny or political injustice seek to bar man's progress to a pure democracy."

He became involved in politics as an antislavery member of the Democratic Party, and in 1846 Governor Francis R. Shunk appointed Kelley a Judge of the Philadelphia County Court of Common Pleas, where he served until 1856.

Kelley came to national attention after his first great Republican address in 1854, in Spring Garden Hall Philadelphia, where he spoke against the slave trade, "Slavery in the Territories", was published and widely read.

He was elected as a member to the American Philosophical Society in 1884.

=== Founding the Republican Party and Congressional career ===
After the repeal of the Missouri Compromise by the Kansas-Nebraska Act in 1854, Kelley quit the Democratic Party and was one of the founders of the Republican Party.

Kelley was elected as a Republican to Congress in 1860 and served from March 4, 1861, until his death in Washington, D.C. Friendly with Abraham Lincoln, he had served on the committee that went to Springfield to inform the Republican that he had been nominated by the Chicago convention in 1860. He became one of the most prominent figures in the Union League of Philadelphia and an early advocate of enlisting black soldiers on the Union side. At the war's end, when the United States flag was raised over Fort Sumter again, Kelley was one of the delegation sent to attend the ceremony. He spoke often on the justice and necessity of "impartial suffrage", or voting rights for African-Americans, introduced a bill (which passed into law) in the 39th United States Congress which gave the right to vote to African-Americans in the District of Columbia. He also spoke in favor of impeaching President Johnson, who had vetoed the Civil Rights Act of 1866 and the Freedmen's Bureau Bill . In promote the idea of impeaching Johnson, Kelley remarked, " the bloody and untilled fields of the ten unreconstructed States, the unsheeted ghosts of the two thousand murdered negroes in Texas, cry...for the punishment of Andrew Johnson."

Kelley served as Chairman of the House Committee on Coinage, Weights, and Measures (1867–1873), Ways and Means Committee (1881–1883), and Committee on Manufactures (1889–1890).

=== Military service ===
As a member of Congress, Kelley was exempt from military service. Nevertheless, during the American Civil War he volunteered during a September, 1862 emergency call up for service in the Independent Artillery Company, a home guard unit. He served his term of enlistment as a Private.

=== Yellowstone ===
In 1871, Kelley was the first Washington politician to suggest what would later become Yellowstone National Park, as reported by Jay Cooke: "Let Congress pass a bill reserving the Great Geyser Basin as a public park forever--just as it has reserved that far inferior wonder the Yosemite Valley "

He served as chairman on the United States House Committee on Coinage, Weights, and Measures, as Chairman of the Committee on Ways and Means, and on the Committee on Manufactures (51st United States Congress).

In his later career, Kelley was best known as an advocate of a high protective tariff. His support for high duties on two Pennsylvania products, iron and steel, earned him the nickname, "Pig-Iron" Kelley. His belief was sincere, and so strong that he would never let himself wear any garment made from an imported product or use any article made in a foreign country, and often lectured his friends for using goods that foreign labor had fashioned. Contrary to what his critics assumed, he never had any financial investments in ironworks or any branch of the iron trade, mines or mining stock.

In 1872, Kelley was among the congressmen accused by the "New York Sun" of having taken bribes from Credit Mobilier, the company formed to construct the Union Pacific Railroad. Kelley, who protested his innocence, had been given Credit Mobilier stock and paid for it out of its dividends, but no evidence showed that he had been asked for any favors in return, and it did not affect his career. Far more controversially, he favored an expansion of the national currency supply during the depression of the 1870s, a position shared at the time by many iron and steel manufacturers troubled by tight credit and currency deflation. To eastern critics, that proved that he was a communist, "an outcast -- a madman. Nobody owns him," said one reporter, "and he is called 'the 365 lunatic.' When he first rose in debate he had the appearance of a crazy man, and a stranger in the galleries would have been excusable for thinking that there was a man just out of bedlam.".

=== Crédit Mobilier scandal ===
An 1873 investigation connected Kelley to the Crédit Mobilier of America scandal. The Congressional committee that reviewed the issue suggested that in the late 1860s Kelley had accepted dividends from shares of Credit Mobilier stock despite not yet having paid for them. Kelley stated that he had contracted with Oakes Ames, a member of the House involved with Crédit Mobilier, to purchase ten shares. At the time of the purchase, Kelley was not prepared to pay, so Ames agreed to hold his shares for him. Kelley told the House that he believed that Ames had sold the stock, and then had paid Kelley the difference between what Kelley had agreed to pay for it and the amount that Ames had received when he sold it—a legitimate transaction by the standards of the day. He also noted to House members that he had been involved in other activities, such as the letting of ship construction contracts during the Civil War, where opportunities for bribery and corruption existed, but had never been accused of dishonesty in those matters. A motion to censure him went through several procedural votes before it was tabled without action.

== Character ==
Thin, "a tall lath of a man with a bloodshotten eye and a voice like an eloquent graveyard," as one reporter put it, Kelley ranked as one of the hardest workers in Congress. He was known for his generous and honorable character, according to biographer Dr. L. P. Brockett, who said "he would scorn to do an act of injustice to a political opponent as much as to his dearest personal friend." An assiduous scholar, he indulged in no social pleasures, spending his spare time studying political economy. He was generous with what money he had, but frugal in his own wants, and even enemies saw him as a warm-hearted, impulsive man. Though he died with an estate worth more than $65,000 (about $1.6 million in 2012), mostly from real estate investments in West Philadelphia, obituaries noted that he had never made money from office and never tried to. He opposed the franking privilege and insisted on paying the postage on letters he sent, and refused the free railroad passes so common in his day.

== Death and burial ==
A lifelong tobacco smoker, he died from complications arising from mouth and throat cancer, from which he had suffered for some six years. He was buried at Laurel Hill Cemetery in Philadelphia.

== Family ==
His daughter Florence Kelley was an influential social reformer, associated with Hull House.

A granddaughter, Martha Mott Kelley, wrote murder mysteries under the pseudonym Patrick Quentin.

== Quotes ==
"Sir, the bloody and untilled fields of the ten unreconstructed States, the unsheeted ghosts of the two thousand murdered negroes in Texas, cry, if the dead ever evoke vengeance, for the punishment of Andrew Johnson" (February 22, 1868)

== Works ==
=== Speeches ===
- Slavery in the Territories (1854)
- The Recognition of Hayti and Liberia (1862)
- Speech of Hon. William D. Kelley, of Pennsylvania, on Protection to American Labor; Delivered in the House of Representatives, January 31, 1866
- The Financial Problem (1876)

=== Books ===
- The Equality of All Men Before the Law: Claimed and Defended (1865)
- Reasons for Abandoning the Theory of Free Trade and Adopting the Principle of Protection to American Industry (1872)
- Speeches, Addresses (1872)
- Letters on Industrial and Financial Questions (1872)
- Letters from Europe (1880)
- The Old South and the New (1887)

== See also ==
- List of members of the United States Congress who died in office (1790–1899)

== Sources ==
- Brockett, Linus Pierpoint (1868). Men of Our Day: or Biographical Sketches of Patriots, Orators, Statesmen, Generals, Reformers, Financiers and Merchants, Now on the Stage of Action: Including Those Who in Military, Political, Business and Social Life, are the Prominent Leaders of the Time in This Country. Zeigler, McCurdy & Company.
- Brown, Ira V. "William D. Kelley and Radical Reconstruction", The Pennsylvania Magazine of History and Biography, Volume 85, No. 3 (July 1961), pp. 316–329
- Kelley, Florence, The Autobiography of Florence Kelley: Notes of Sixty Years, Charles H. Kerr Publishing Company, Chicago, 1986 ISBN 0-88286-093-3
- U.S. Congress (1890). Memorial Addresses of the Life and Character of William D. Kelley (A Representative from Pennsylvania), Delivered in the House of Representatives and in the Senate, Fifty-First Congress, First Session. Government Printing Office.
- United States Congress. "William D. Kelley (id: K000062)". Biographical Directory of the United States Congress.
- William D. Kelley at The Political Graveyard

U.S. House of Representatives
Preceded by William Millward	Member of the U.S. House of Representatives from Pennsylvania's 4th congressional district 1861–1890	Succeeded by John E. Reyburn
