= Jacob Broom (Pennsylvania politician) =

American politician

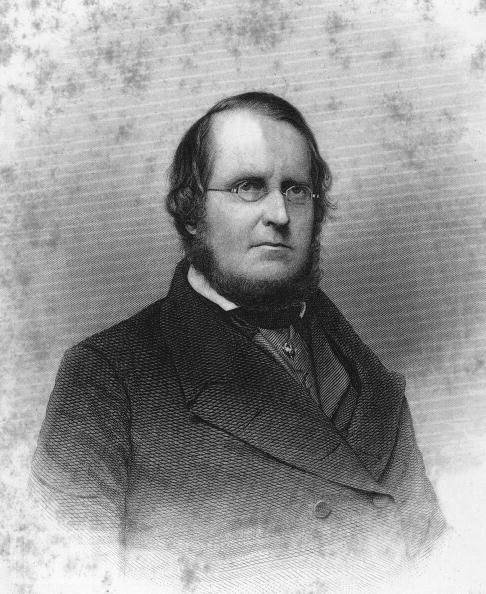

Member of the U.S. House of Representatives from Pennsylvania's 4th district
- In office March 4, 1855 – March 3, 1857
- Preceded by: William H. Witte
- Succeeded by: Henry M. Phillips

Personal details
- Born: July 25, 1808 Baltimore, Maryland, U.S.
- Died: November 28, 1864 (aged 56)
- Party: American

Jacob Broom (July 25, 1808 – November 28, 1864) was an American Party member of the U.S. House of Representatives from Pennsylvania.

Jacob Broom (who was the son of Delaware congressman James Madison Broom and grandson of Delaware politician Jacob Broom) was born in Baltimore, Maryland. He moved to Philadelphia with his parents in 1819. He studied law, was admitted to the bar in 1832 and started practicing in Philadelphia. He was appointed deputy auditor of the State in 1840, and clerk of the Philadelphia Orphans’ Court from 1848 to 1852.

== Campaign for President ==
In 1852 Broom ran for President of the United States under unusual circumstances for the Native American Party, later known as the American Party and generally known as the Know Nothings. Broom presided over the party's national convention, which nominated Daniel Webster as its presidential candidate. When Webster died nine days before the election, Broom was hurriedly named as his replacement, with Reynell Coates of New Jersey as his running mate. Broom received 2,566 popular votes (0.08%), finishing a poor fifth behind Webster (6,994 votes, 0.22%), who had also been nominated by the Union Party of Georgia. Neither Webster nor Broom received any electoral votes.

== Congressional service ==
Broom was elected as a candidate of the American Party to the Thirty-fourth Congress in 1854. He served as chairman of the House Committee on Revolutionary Pensions during the Thirty-fourth Congress. He was an unsuccessful candidate for renomination in 1856 and for election to the Thirty-sixth Congress in 1858. He died in Washington, D.C., in 1864. Interment in Congressional Cemetery.

== Sources ==
- United States Congress. "Jacob Broom (id: B000887)". Biographical Directory of the United States Congress.
- The Political Graveyard
- Convention details
- Election results Archived 2008-05-17 at the Wayback Machine
- Race details

U.S. House of Representatives
| Preceded by William H. Witte | Member of the U.S. House of Representatives from Pennsylvania's 4th congressional district 1855–1857 | Succeeded by Henry M. Phillips |
