= John Woodruff (Connecticut politician) =

American politician from Connecticut

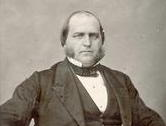
- Born: February 12, 1826; West Hartford, Connecticut, United States
- Died: May 20, 1868 (aged 42); New Haven, Connecticut
- Burial place: Evergreen Cemetery
- Occupation: politician
- Years active: 1848–1868
- Spouse: Harriet Jane Lester
- Children: Harriet, Timothy L.
- Parents: Timothy Woodruff (father); Sylvia Woodruff (mother)

John Woodruff (February 12, 1826 – May 20, 1868) was a U.S. representative from Connecticut.

== Early life ==
Born in West Hartford, Connecticut, Woodruff was the son of Timothy (1798–1835) and Sylvia Woodruff (1798–1868). His parents were fourth cousins, once removed. His paternal great-grandfather, Timothy Woodruff (1732–1788), served as a Captain during the French and Indian War. His maternal grandfather and maternal great-grandfathers all served as Captains in the American Revolutionary War: Solomon Woodruff (1763–1822), Noah Woodruff (1730–1790) and Eliphalet Curtis (1736–1806). He was also a descendant of Governor Thomas Welles.

Woodruff received limited schooling. In 1835, he moved to Catskill, New York. He returned to Connecticut in 1841 and settled in Bristol, where he worked in a clock factory until 1845, when he moved to New Haven. He was elected a member of the common council in 1848 and served several terms. He served as member of the general assembly in 1852.

He was elected as a candidate of the American Party to the Thirty-fourth Congress (March 4, 1855 – March 3, 1857). He was an unsuccessful candidate for reelection in 1856 to the Thirty-fifth Congress. He was then elected as a Republican to the Thirty-sixth Congress (March 4, 1859 – March 3, 1861).

Upon establishment of the office in 1862, he was appointed Collector of Internal Revenue for the Second District of Connecticut and served until his death in New Haven, Connecticut, May 20, 1868. He was interred in Evergreen Cemetery.

== Personal life ==
He married Harriet Jane Lester (1833–1876). They had a daughter, Harriet Jane Woodruff Ward (1865–1937), and a son, Timothy Lester Woodruff (1858–1913), a three-term Lieutenant Governor of New York.

U.S. House of Representatives
Preceded by Colin M. Ingersoll	Member of the U.S. House of Representatives from Connecticut's 2nd congressional district 1855–1857	Succeeded by Samuel Arnold
Preceded by Samuel Arnold	Member of the U.S. House of Representatives from Connecticut's 2nd congressional district 1859–1861	Succeeded by James E. English
