= Samuel Arnold (Connecticut politician) =

American politician

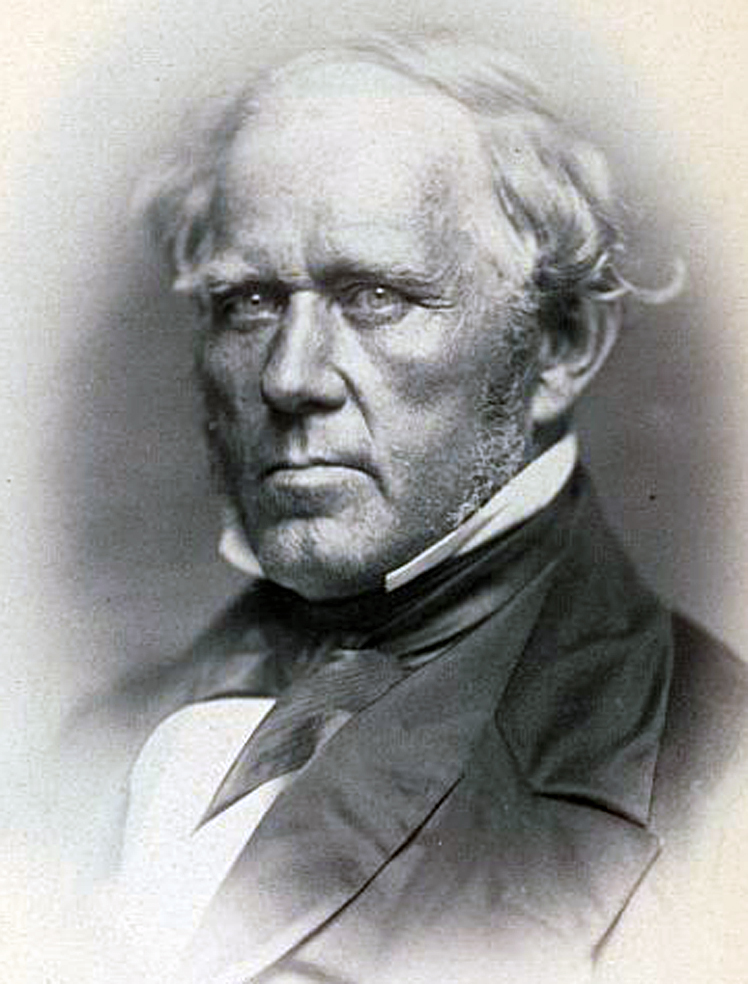
- Samuel Arnold (1859)
- Born: June 1, 1806; Haddam, Connecticut, U.S.
- Died: May 5, 1869 (aged 62); Haddam, Connecticut, U.S.
- Occupation: American congressman for Connecticut

Samuel Arnold (June 1, 1806 – May 5, 1869) was a U.S. representative from Connecticut.

Born in Haddam, Arnold attended the local academy at Plainfield, and Westfield Academy, Massachusetts. He devoted most of his life to agricultural pursuits. He acquired a controlling interest in a stone quarry, and became owner of a line of schooners operating between New York and Philadelphia. He was, also, for a number of years, president of the Bank of East Haddam. He served as member of the Connecticut House of Representatives in 1839, 1842, 1844, and again in 1851.

Arnold was elected as a Democrat to the Thirty-fifth Congress (March 4, 1857 – March 3, 1859). He declined to be a candidate for renomination in 1858. He resumed agricultural pursuits and quarrying. He died in Haddam on May 5, 1869. He was interred in a mausoleum on his estate near Haddam.

U.S. House of Representatives
Preceded by John Woodruff	Member of the U.S. House of Representatives from Connecticut's 2nd congressional district 1857–1859	Succeeded by John Woodruff
