= Christopher Robinson (Rhode Island politician) =

American politician

Member of the U.S. House of Representatives from Rhode Island's 1st district
- In office March 4, 1859 – March 3, 1861
- Preceded by: Nathan B. Durfee
- Succeeded by: William P. Sheffield

Personal details
- Born: May 15, 1806 Providence, Rhode Island, U.S.
- Died: October 3, 1889 (aged 83) Woonsocket, Rhode Island, U.S.
- Party: Republican

Christopher Robinson (May 15, 1806 – October 3, 1889) was a United States representative from Rhode Island.

He was born in Providence on May 15, 1806 and graduated from Brown University in 1825.

He studied law and was admitted to the bar in 1833. He commenced practice in Woonsocket, Rhode Island. He was elected Attorney General of Rhode Island in 1854. He then was elected as a Republican to the Thirty-sixth Congress (March 4, 1859 – March 3, 1861). He was an unsuccessful candidate for reelection.

He was appointed Minister to Peru from 1861–1866, and was a delegate from Rhode Island to the Loyalist Convention held in Philadelphia in 1866. He died in Woonsocket on October 3, 1889. His grave is in Oak Hill Cemetery.

== Sources ==
- United States Congress. "Christopher Robinson (id: R000333)". Biographical Directory of the United States Congress.

U.S. House of Representatives
Preceded by Nathan B. Durfee	Member of the U.S. House of Representatives from Rhode Island's 1st congressional district March 4, 1859 – March 3, 1861	Succeeded by William P. Sheffield
