= Thomas Davis (Rhode Island politician) =

Irish-American manufacturer, politician and abolitionist

Member of the Rhode Island House of Representatives
- In office 1887–1890

Member of the Rhode Island Senate
- In office 1845–1853
- In office 1877–1878

Member of the U.S. House of Representatives from Rhode Island's 1st district
- In office March 4, 1853 – March 3, 1855
- Preceded by: George Gordon King
- Succeeded by: Nathan B. Durfee

Personal details
- Born: December 18, 1806 Dublin, Ireland
- Died: July 26, 1895 (aged 88) Providence, Rhode Island, U.S.
- Resting place: Swan Point Cemetery; Providence, Rhode Island
- Party: Democratic
- Spouses: Eliza Chase (died); Paulina Kellogg Wright (m. 1849; died 1876)
- Children: 2 (adopted)
- Occupation: Manufacturer; Politician; Abolitionist
- Committees: Providence school committee

Thomas Davis (December 18, 1806 – July 26, 1895) was a British-American manufacturer, politician and abolitionist. He was a Democratic member of the U.S. House of Representatives, and served in the Rhode Island State Senate and the Rhode Island House of Representatives.

== Early life and education ==
Davis was born in Dublin on the island of Ireland (the entirety of which was then part of the U.K.), where he attended private schools. He was of an Anglo-Irish background, being of English and Welsh descent, and was part of the landowning Protestant Ascendancy. Davis attended the Anglican Church of Ireland. In 1817, he emigrated with his family to the United States and they settled in Providence, Rhode Island. In Providence, he engaged in jewelry manufacturing and became quite wealthy.

== Political career ==
He became involved in politics and was a member of the Rhode Island State Senate from 1845 to 1853. Davis was elected to the Thirty-third Congress, and served from March 4, 1853, to March 3, 1855. While in Congress, he was outspoken about his disapproval of the Kansas-Nebraska Act. In 1854, he was an unsuccessful candidate for reelection to the Thirty-fourth Congress, and returned to his manufacturing pursuits.

Davis hoped to return to Congress, and was an unsuccessful candidate for election to the Thirty-sixth, Forty-second, Forty-third, and Forty-sixth Congresses. He served in the State Senate again in 1877 and 1878, and was a member of the State House from 1887 to 1890.

He was an abolitionist and was against the real estate requirement for voting that Rhode Island imposed upon naturalized citizens. Davis was on the North Providence, Rhode Island executive school committee, and was a member of the Rhode Island Historical Society.

== Death and legacy ==
Davis died in Providence on July 26, 1895, and is interred in Swan Point Cemetery.

In 2003, he was inducted into the Rhode Island Heritage Hall of Fame.

== Family life ==
Davis' first wife was Eliza Chase. Following Eliza's death, he married abolitionist, suffragist, and educator Paulina Kellogg Wright Davis in 1849. The couple adopted two daughters, and remained together until Paulina's death in 1876.

U.S. House of Representatives
Preceded by George Gordon King	Member of the U.S. House of Representatives from Rhode Island's 1st congressional district 1853–1855	Succeeded by Nathan B. Durfee
