= Isaac N. Morris =

American politician

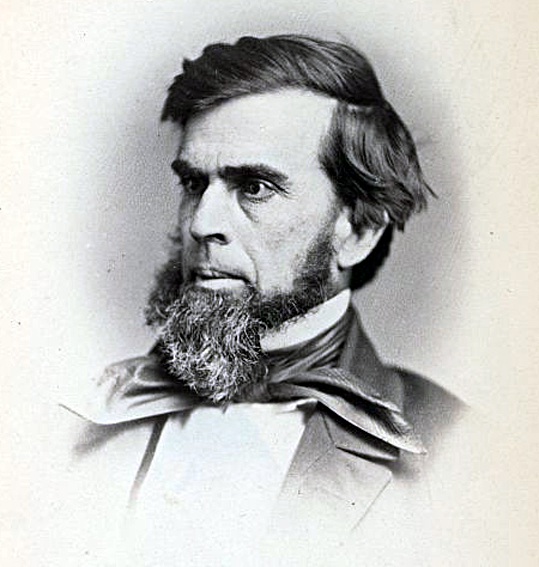

Member of the U.S. House of Representatives from Illinois's 5th district
- In office March 4, 1857 – March 3, 1861
- Preceded by: Jacob C. Davis
- Succeeded by: William Alexander Richardson

Member of the Illinois House of Representatives
- In office 1846-1848

Personal details
- Born: January 22, 1812 Bethel, Ohio
- Died: October 29, 1879 (aged 67) Quincy, Illinois
- Party: Democratic

Isaac Newton Morris (January 22, 1812 – October 29, 1879) was a United States representative from Illinois, son of Thomas Morris and brother of Jonathan David Morris.

== Biography ==
Isaac N. Morris was born in Bethel, Ohio. Morris attended Miami University in Oxford, Ohio. He studied law and was admitted to the bar in 1835 and commenced practice in Warsaw, Illinois, in 1836. He moved to Quincy, Illinois in 1838 and continued the practice of law. He was appointed secretary of state of Illinois in 1840, but declined. He served as president of the Illinois & Michigan Canal Co. in 1841. He served as member of the State house of representatives 1846-1848.

Morris was elected as a Democrat to the Thirty-fifth and Thirty-sixth Congresses (March 4, 1857 – March 3, 1861). He was not a candidate for renomination in 1860. He was appointed commissioner for the Union Pacific Railroad by President Ulysses S. Grant in 1869. Morris died in Quincy, Illinois on October 29, 1879, and was interred in Woodland Cemetery. He is the namesake of Morris, Illinois.

U.S. House of Representatives
Preceded by Jacob C. Davis	Member of the U.S. House of Representatives from Illinois's 5th congressional district 1857–1861	Succeeded by William Alexander Richardson
