= Nathan B. Durfee =

American politician

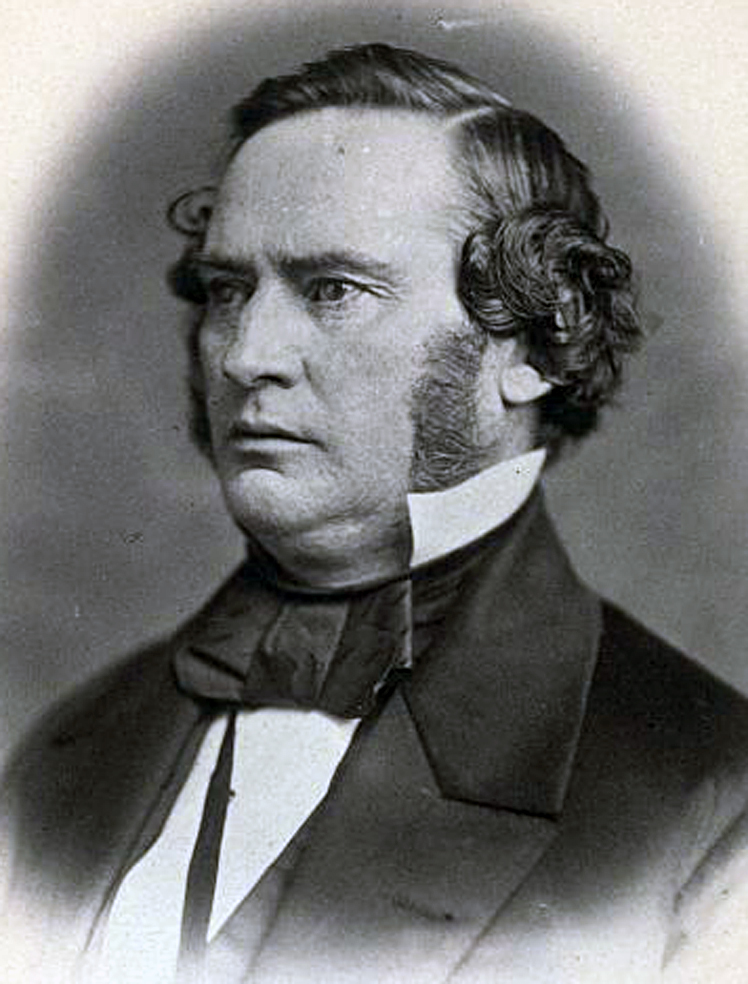

Member of the U.S. House of Representatives from Rhode Island's 1st district
- In office March 4, 1855 – March 3, 1859
- Preceded by: Thomas Davis
- Succeeded by: Christopher Robinson

Personal details
- Born: September 29, 1812 Tiverton, Rhode Island, U.S.
- Died: November 9, 1872 (aged 60) Tiverton, Rhode Island, U.S.
- Party: Know Nothing; Republican

Nathaniel Briggs Durfee (September 29, 1812 – November 9, 1872) was a U.S. representative from Rhode Island.

Born in Tiverton, Rhode Island, Durfee completed preparatory studies. He engaged in agricultural pursuits and conducted a fruit orchard. He served as member of the Rhode Island House of Representatives for eleven years.

Durfee was elected as a candidate of the American Party to the Thirty-fourth Congress and as a Republican to the Thirty-fifth Congress (March 4, 1855 – March 3, 1859). He resumed his former pursuits. He was serving as county clerk at the time of his death in Tiverton, Rhode Island, on November 9, 1872. He was interred in the family burial ground near Tiverton, Rhode Island.

== Sources ==
- United States Congress. "Nathan B. Durfee (id: D000569)". Biographical Directory of the United States Congress.

U.S. House of Representatives
| Preceded by Thomas Davis | Member of the U.S. House of Representatives from Rhode Island's 1st congressional district 1855–1859 | Succeeded by Christopher Robinson |
