= Jacob C. Davis =

American politician

Member of the U.S. House of Representatives from Illinois's 5th district
- In office November 4, 1856 – March 3, 1857
- Preceded by: William Alexander Richardson
- Succeeded by: Isaac N. Morris

Member of the Illinois Senate
- In office 1842-1848; 1850-1856

Personal details
- Born: September 16, 1820 Staunton, Virginia, U.S.
- Died: December 25, 1883 (aged 63) Alexandria, Missouri, U.S.
- Party: Democratic

Jacob Cunningham Davis (September 16, 1820 – December 25, 1883) was a politician, a U.S. Representative from Illinois. He was one of five men tried and acquitted in Illinois of the murder in 1844 of Joseph Smith, founder of the Latter Day Saint movement.

== Political life ==
Born near Staunton, Virginia, Davis attended the common schools and the College of William & Mary, Williamsburg, Virginia. He moved to Warsaw, Illinois, in 1838, where he studied law. He was admitted to the bar and commenced practice in Warsaw. He served as clerk of Hancock County, Illinois. He was appointed circuit clerk in 1841.

He was elected and served in the Illinois Senate from 1842 to 1848 and again from 1850 until his resignation in 1856, having been elected to Congress.

Davis was elected as a Democrat to the Thirty-fourth Congress to fill the vacancy caused by the resignation of William A. Richardson. He served from November 4, 1856 to March 3, 1857. He was not a candidate for re-election. After leaving Congress, Davis resumed the practice of law in Clark County, Missouri. He died in Alexandria, Missouri, December 25, 1883. He was interred in Mitchell Cemetery, near Alexandria, Missouri.

== Murder trial ==
In 1844, Davis was indicted and tried for the murders of Joseph Smith and Hyrum Smith. The Smiths had been imprisoned in Carthage Jail when the prison was stormed by an armed mob that shot and killed them. As a captain in command of the Warsaw Rifle Company of the Illinois militia, Davis was accused of having ordered his men to storm the prison. At trial, Davis and four other defendants were found by a jury to be not guilty of the murders.

== Notes ==
U.S. House of Representatives
Preceded by William Alexander Richardson	Member of the U.S. House of Representatives from Illinois's 5th congressional district 1856–1857	Succeeded by Isaac N. Morris
