= List of United States representatives in the 34th Congress =

This is a complete list of United States representatives during the 34th United States Congress listed by seniority.

As an historical article, the districts and party affiliations listed reflect those during the 34th Congress (March 4, 1855 – March 3, 1857). Seats and party affiliations on similar lists for other congresses will be different for certain members.

Seniority depends on the date on which members were sworn into office. Since many members are sworn in on the same day, subsequent ranking is based on previous congressional service of the individual and then by alphabetical order by the last name of the representative.

Committee chairmanship in the House is often associated with seniority. However, party leadership is typically not associated with seniority.

Note: The "*" indicates that the representative/delegate may have served one or more non-consecutive terms while in the House of Representatives of the United States Congress.

== U.S. House seniority list ==
U.S. House seniority
Rank	Representative	Party	District	Seniority date (Previous service, if any)	Term #	Notes
1	Joshua R. Giddings	O	OH-20	December 5, 1842; Previous service, 1838–1842.	11th term*	Dean and Speaker of the House
2	George W. Jones	D	TN-06	March 4, 1843	7th term	
3	Alexander H. Stephens	D	GA-08	October 2, 1843	7th term	
4	Thomas H. Bayly	D	VA-01	May 6, 1844	7th term	Died on June 23, 1856.
5	John S. Phelps	D	MO-06	March 4, 1845	6th term	
6	Thomas L. Clingman	D	NC-08	March 4, 1847; Previous service, 1843–1845.	6th term*	
7	Thomas S. Bocock	D	VA-05	March 4, 1847	5th term	
8	Williamson R. W. Cobb	D	AL-06	March 4, 1847	5th term	
9	Sampson W. Harris	D	AL-07	March 4, 1847	5th term	Left the House in 1857.
10	William A. Richardson	D	IL-05	December 6, 1847	5th term	Resigned on August 25, 1856.
11	John McQueen	D	SC-01	February 12, 1849	5th term	
12	Henry Bennett	O	NY-21	March 4, 1849	4th term	
13	Lewis D. Campbell	O	OH-03	March 4, 1849	4th term	
14	Henry A. Edmundson	D	VA-12	March 4, 1849	4th term	
15	Thomas J. D. Fuller	D	ME-06	March 4, 1849	4th term	Left the House in 1857.
16	Fayette McMullen	D	VA-13	March 4, 1849	4th term	Left the House in 1857.
17	John Millson	D	VA-02	March 4, 1849	4th term	
18	James L. Orr	D	SC-05	March 4, 1849	4th term	
19	Paulus Powell	D	VA-06	March 4, 1849	4th term	
20	James Meacham	O	VT-01	December 3, 1849	4th term	Died on August 23, 1856.
21	William Aiken Jr.	D	SC-02	March 4, 1851	3rd term	Left the House in 1857.
22	John Caskie	D	VA-03	March 4, 1851	3rd term	
23	Charles J. Faulkner	D	VA-08	March 4, 1851	3rd term	
24	Thomas B. Florence	D	PA-01	March 4, 1851	3rd term	
25	Galusha A. Grow	D	PA-14	March 4, 1851	3rd term	
26	Solomon G. Haven	O	NY-32	March 4, 1851	3rd term	Left the House in 1857.
27	George S. Houston	D	AL-05	March 4, 1851; Previous service, 1841–1849.	7th term*	
28	John Letcher	D	VA-09	March 4, 1851	3rd term	
29	Daniel Mace	O	IN-08	March 4, 1851	3rd term	Left the House in 1857.
30	John G. Miller	O	MO-05	March 4, 1851	3rd term	Died on May 11, 1856.
31	William R. Smith	KN	AL-04	March 4, 1851	3rd term	Left the House in 1857.
32	Benjamin B. Thurston	D	RI-02	March 4, 1851; Previous service, 1847–1849.	4th term*	Left the House in 1857.
33	Israel Washburn Jr.	O	ME-05	March 4, 1851	3rd term	
34	James C. Allen	D	IL-07	March 4, 1853	2nd term	Resigned on July 18, 1856. Returned to the House on November 4, 1856; Left the House in 1857.
35	Edward Ball	O	OH-16	March 4, 1853	2nd term	Left the House in 1857.
36	Nathaniel P. Banks	KN	MA-07	March 4, 1853	2nd term	Speaker of the House
37	William Barksdale	D	MS-03	March 4, 1853	2nd term	
38	Peter H. Bell	D	TX-02	March 4, 1853	2nd term	Left the House in 1857.
39	Samuel P. Benson	O	ME-04	March 4, 1853	2nd term	Left the House in 1857.
40	William W. Boyce	D	SC-06	March 4, 1853	2nd term	
41	Preston Brooks	D	SC-04	March 4, 1853	2nd term	Resigned on July 15, 1856. Returned to the House on August 1, 1856. Died on January 27, 1857.
42	Samuel Caruthers	O	MO-07	March 4, 1853	2nd term	
43	Francis B. Craige	D	NC-07	March 4, 1853	2nd term	
44	Leander Cox	KN	KY-09	March 4, 1853	2nd term	Left the House in 1857.
45	Alexander De Witt	KN	MA-09	March 4, 1853	2nd term	Left the House in 1857.
46	John Dick	O	PA-25	March 4, 1853	2nd term	
47	James F. Dowdell	D	AL-03	March 4, 1853	2nd term	
48	John M. Elliott	D	KY-06	March 4, 1853	2nd term	
49	William H. English	D	IN-02	March 4, 1853	2nd term	
50	Emerson Etheridge	KN	TN-09	March 4, 1853	2nd term	Left the House in 1857.
51	Thomas T. Flagler	O	NY-31	March 4, 1853	2nd term	Left the House in 1857.
52	William Goode	D	VA-04	March 4, 1853; Previous service, 1841–1843.	3rd term*	
53	Alfred B. Greenwood	D	AR-01	March 4, 1853	2nd term	
54	Aaron Harlan	O	OH-07	March 4, 1853	2nd term	
55	John S. Harrison	O	OH-02	March 4, 1853	2nd term	Left the House in 1857.
56	Laurence M. Keitt	D	SC-03	March 4, 1853	2nd term	Resigned on July 15, 1856. Returned to the House on August 6, 1856.
57	Zedekiah Kidwell	D	VA-10	March 4, 1853	2nd term	Left the House in 1857.
58	James Knox	O	IL-04	March 4, 1853	2nd term	Left the House in 1857.
59	James J. Lindley	O	MO-03	March 4, 1853	2nd term	Left the House in 1857.
60	Orsamus B. Matteson	O	NY-20	March 4, 1853; Previous service, 1849–1851.	3rd term*	Resigned on February 27, 1857.
61	Augustus Maxwell	D	FL	March 4, 1853	2nd term	Left the House in 1857.
62	Smith Miller	D	IN-01	March 4, 1853	2nd term	Left the House in 1857.
63	Edwin B. Morgan	O	NY-25	March 4, 1853	2nd term	
64	Matthias H. Nichols	O	OH-04	March 4, 1853	2nd term	
65	Jesse O. Norton	O	IL-03	March 4, 1853	2nd term	Left the House in 1857.
66	Andrew Oliver	D	NY-26	March 4, 1853	2nd term	Left the House in 1857.
67	Mordecai Oliver	O	MO-04	March 4, 1853	2nd term	Left the House in 1857.
68	Asa Packer	D	PA-13	March 4, 1853	2nd term	Left the House in 1857.
69	Alexander C. M. Pennington	O	NJ-05	March 4, 1853	2nd term	Left the House in 1857.
70	Benjamin Pringle	O	NY-30	March 4, 1853	2nd term	Left the House in 1857.
71	Richard C. Puryear	KN	NC-06	March 4, 1853	2nd term	Left the House in 1857.
72	Charles Ready	KN	TN-05	March 4, 1853	2nd term	
73	David Ritchie	O	PA-21	March 4, 1853	2nd term	
74	Thomas H. Ruffin	D	NC-02	March 4, 1853	2nd term	
75	Alvah Sabin	O	VT-03	March 4, 1853	2nd term	Left the House in 1857.
76	Russell Sage	O	NY-13	March 4, 1853	2nd term	Left the House in 1857.
77	William R. Sapp	O	OH-15	March 4, 1853	2nd term	Left the House in 1857.
78	James L. Seward	D	GA-01	March 4, 1853	2nd term	
79	George A. Simmons	O	NY-16	March 4, 1853	2nd term	Left the House in 1857.
80	Samuel A. Smith	D	TN-03	March 4, 1853	2nd term	
81	William Smith	D	VA-07	March 4, 1853; Previous service, 1841–1843.	3rd term*	
82	George Vail	D	NJ-04	March 4, 1853	2nd term	Left the House in 1857.
83	Edward Wade	O	OH-19	March 4, 1853	2nd term	
84	Elihu B. Washburne	O	IL-01	March 4, 1853	2nd term	
85	Daniel Wells Jr.	D	WI-01	March 4, 1853	2nd term	Left the House in 1857.
86	John Wheeler	D	NY-06	March 4, 1853	2nd term	Left the House in 1857.
87	Daniel B. Wright	D	MS-01	March 4, 1853	2nd term	Left the House in 1857.
88	Felix Zollicoffer	KN	TN-08	March 4, 1853	2nd term	
89	Jehu G. Jones	D	PA-08	February 4, 1854; Previous service, 1851–1853.	3rd term*	
90	Charles J. Albright	O	OH-17	March 4, 1855	1st term	Left the House in 1857.
91	John Allison	O	PA-23	March 4, 1855; Previous service, 1851–1853.	2nd term*	Left the House in 1857.
92	Lucien Barbour	O	IN-06	March 4, 1855	1st term	Left the House in 1857.
93	David Barclay	D	PA-24	March 4, 1855	1st term	Left the House in 1857.
94	Hendley S. Bennett	D	MS-02	March 4, 1855	1st term	Left the House in 1857.
95	Philemon Bliss	O	OH-14	March 4, 1855	1st term	
96	Charles Billinghurst	O	WI-03	March 4, 1855	1st term	
97	John Bingham	O	OH-21	March 4, 1855	1st term	
98	James Bishop	O	NJ-03	March 4, 1855	1st term	Left the House in 1857.
99	Thomas F. Bowie	D	MD-06	March 4, 1855	1st term	
100	Samuel C. Bradshaw	O	PA-07	March 4, 1855	1st term	Left the House in 1857.
101	Lawrence O'Bryan Branch	D	NC-04	March 4, 1855	1st term	
102	Samuel Brenton	O	IN-10	March 4, 1855; Previous service, 1851–1853.	2nd term*	
103	Jacob Broom	KN	PA-04	March 4, 1855	1st term	Left the House in 1857.
104	James Buffington	KN	MA-02	March 4, 1855	1st term	
105	Anson Burlingame	KN	MA-05	March 4, 1855	1st term	
106	Henry C. Burnett	D	KY-01	March 4, 1855	1st term	
107	John Cadwalader	D	PA-05	March 4, 1855	1st term	Left the House in 1857.
108	James H. Campbell	O	PA-11	March 4, 1855	1st term	Left the House in 1857.
109	John P. Campbell Jr.	KN	KY-02	March 4, 1855	1st term	Left the House in 1857.
110	John S. Carlile	KN	VA-11	March 4, 1855	1st term	Left the House in 1857.
111	Calvin C. Chaffee	KN	MA-10	March 4, 1855	1st term	
112	Thomas Child Jr.	O	NY-07	March 4, 1855	1st term	Left the House in 1857.
113	Ezra Clark Jr.	KN	CT-01	March 4, 1855	1st term	
114	Bayard Clarke	O	NY-09	March 4, 1855	1st term	Left the House in 1857.
115	Isaiah D. Clawson	O	NJ-01	March 4, 1855	1st term	
116	Howell Cobb	D	GA-06	March 4, 1855; Previous service, 1843–1851.	5th term*	Left the House in 1857.
117	Schuyler Colfax	O	IN-09	March 4, 1855	1st term	
118	Linus B. Comins	KN	MA-04	March 4, 1855	1st term	
119	John Covode	O	PA-19	March 4, 1855	1st term	
120	Aaron H. Cragin	KN	NH-03	March 4, 1855	1st term	
121	Elisha D. Cullen	KN	DE	March 4, 1855	1st term	Left the House in 1857.
122	William Cumback	O	IN-04	March 4, 1855	1st term	Left the House in 1857.
123	Martin J. Crawford	D	GA-02	March 4, 1855	1st term	
124	William S. Damrell	KN	MA-03	March 4, 1855	1st term	
125	Thomas G. Davidson	D	LA-03	March 4, 1855	1st term	
126	Timothy Davis	KN	MA-06	March 4, 1855	1st term	
127	Henry W. Davis	KN	MD-04	March 4, 1855	1st term	
128	Timothy C. Day	O	OH-01	March 4, 1855	1st term	Left the House in 1857.
129	Sidney Dean	KN	CT-03	March 4, 1855	1st term	
130	James W. Denver	D	CA	March 4, 1855	1st term	Left the House in 1857.
131	Samuel Dickson	O	NY-14	March 4, 1855	1st term	Left the House in 1857.
132	Edward Dodd	O	NY-15	March 4, 1855	1st term	
133	George Grundy Dunn	O	IN-03	March 4, 1855; Previous service, 1847–1849.	2nd term*	Left the House in 1857.
134	Nathan B. Durfee	KN	RI-01	March 4, 1855	1st term	
135	John Rufus Edie	O	PA-18	March 4, 1855	1st term	
136	Francis S. Edwards	O	NY-33	March 4, 1855	1st term	Resigned on February 28, 1857.
137	Jonas R. Emrie	O	OH-06	March 4, 1855	1st term	Left the House in 1857.
138	George Eustis Jr.	KN	LA-01	March 4, 1855	1st term	
139	Lemuel D. Evans	KN	TX-01	March 4, 1855	1st term	Left the House in 1857.
140	Nathaniel G. Foster	KN	GA-07	March 4, 1855	1st term	Left the House in 1857.
141	Henry M. Fuller	O	PA-12	March 4, 1855; Previous service, 1851–1853.	2nd term*	Left the House in 1857.
142	Samuel Galloway	O	OH-12	March 4, 1855	1st term	Left the House in 1857.
143	William A. Gilbert	O	NY-23	March 4, 1855	1st term	Resigned on February 27, 1857.
144	Amos P. Granger	O	NY-24	March 4, 1855	1st term	
145	Augustus Hall	D	IA-01	March 4, 1855	1st term	Left the House in 1857.
146	Robert B. Hall	KN	MA-01	March 4, 1855	1st term	
147	Philemon T. Herbert	D	CA	March 4, 1855	1st term	Left the House in 1857.
148	John Hickman	D	PA-06	March 4, 1855	1st term	
149	James M. Harris	O	MD-03	March 4, 1855	1st term	
150	Thomas L. Harris	D	IL-06	March 4, 1855; Previous service, 1849–1851.	2nd term*	
151	David P. Holloway	O	IN-05	March 4, 1855	1st term	Left the House in 1857.
152	Henry W. Hoffman	KN	MD-05	March 4, 1855	1st term	Left the House in 1857.
153	Thomas R. Horton	O	NY-18	March 4, 1855	1st term	Left the House in 1857.
154	Valentine B. Horton	O	OH-11	March 4, 1855	1st term	
155	William A. Howard	O	MI-01	March 4, 1855	1st term	
156	Jonas A. Hughston	O	NY-19	March 4, 1855	1st term	Left the House in 1857.
157	Joshua Jewett	D	KY-05	March 4, 1855	1st term	
158	John Kelly	D	NY-04	March 4, 1855	1st term	
159	William H. Kelsey	O	NY-28	March 4, 1855	1st term	
160	Luther M. Kennett	O	MO-01	March 4, 1855	1st term	Left the House in 1857.
161	Rufus H. King	O	NY-11	March 4, 1855	1st term	Left the House in 1857.
162	Chauncey L. Knapp	KN	MA-08	March 4, 1855	1st term	
163	Jonathan Knight	O	PA-20	March 4, 1855	1st term	Left the House in 1857.
164	Ebenezer Knowlton	O	ME-03	March 4, 1855	1st term	Left the House in 1857.
165	John C. Kunkel	O	PA-10	March 4, 1855	1st term	
166	William A. Lake	KN	MS-04	March 4, 1855	1st term	Left the House in 1857.
167	Benjamin F. Leiter	O	OH-18	March 4, 1855	1st term	
168	John H. Lumpkin	D	GA-05	March 4, 1855; Previous service, 1843–1849.	4th term*	Left the House in 1857.
169	Alexander K. Marshall	KN	KY-08	March 4, 1855	1st term	Left the House in 1857.
170	Humphrey Marshall	KN	KY-07	March 4, 1855; Previous service, 1849–1852.	3rd term*	
171	Samuel S. Marshall	D	IL-09	March 4, 1855	1st term	
172	Andrew Z. McCarty	O	NY-22	March 4, 1855	1st term	Left the House in 1857.
173	Killian Miller	O	NY-12	March 4, 1855	1st term	Left the House in 1857.
174	William Millward	O	PA-03	March 4, 1855	1st term	Left the House in 1857.
175	Oscar F. Moore	O	OH-10	March 4, 1855	1st term	Left the House in 1857.
176	Justin S. Morrill	O	VT-02	March 4, 1855	1st term	
177	Richard Mott	O	OH-05	March 4, 1855	1st term	
178	Ambrose S. Murray	O	NY-10	March 4, 1855	1st term	
179	Robert T. Paine	KN	NC-01	March 4, 1855	1st term	Left the House in 1857.
180	John M. Parker	O	NY-27	March 4, 1855	1st term	
181	George W. Peck	D	MI-04	March 4, 1855	1st term	Left the House in 1857.
182	John J. Pearce	O	PA-15	March 4, 1855	1st term	Left the House in 1857.
183	Guy R. Pelton	O	NY-03	March 4, 1855	1st term	Left the House in 1857.
184	John J. Perry	O	ME-02	March 4, 1855	1st term	Left the House in 1857.
185	John U. Pettit	O	IN-11	March 4, 1855	1st term	
186	James Pike	KN	NH-01	March 4, 1855	1st term	
187	Gilchrist Porter	O	MO-02	March 4, 1855; Previous service, 1851–1853.	2nd term*	Left the House in 1857.
188	Samuel Anderson Purviance	O	PA-22	March 4, 1855	1st term	
189	John A. Quitman	D	MS-05	March 4, 1855	1st term	
190	Edwin G. Reade	KN	NC-05	March 4, 1855	1st term	Left the House in 1857.
191	James B. Ricaud	KN	MD-02	March 4, 1855	1st term	
192	Thomas Rivers	KN	TN-10	March 4, 1855	1st term	Left the House in 1857.
193	George R. Robbins	O	NJ-02	March 4, 1855	1st term	Left the House in 1857.
194	Anthony E. Roberts	O	PA-09	March 4, 1855	1st term	
195	David F. Robison	O	PA-17	March 4, 1855	1st term	Left the House in 1857.
196	Albert Rust	D	AR-02	March 4, 1855	1st term	Left the House in 1857.
197	John M. Sandidge	D	LA-04	March 4, 1855	1st term	
198	John H. Savage	D	TN-04	March 4, 1855; Previous service, 1849–1853.	3rd term*	
199	Harvey D. Scott	O	IN-07	March 4, 1855	1st term	Left the House in 1857.
200	John Sherman	O	OH-13	March 4, 1855	1st term	
201	Eli S. Shorter	D	AL-02	March 4, 1855	1st term	
202	William H. Sneed	D	TN-02	March 4, 1855	1st term	Left the House in 1857.
203	Francis E. Spinner	O	NY-17	March 4, 1855	1st term	
204	Benjamin Stanton	O	OH-08	March 4, 1855; Previous service, 1851–1853.	2nd term*	
205	James A. Stewart	D	MD-01	March 4, 1855	1st term	
206	James S. T. Stranahan	O	NY-02	March 4, 1855	1st term	Left the House in 1857.
207	Samuel F. Swope	KN	KY-10	March 4, 1855	1st term	Left the House in 1857.
208	Albert G. Talbott	D	KY-04	March 4, 1855	1st term	
209	Mason Tappan	KN	NH-02	March 4, 1855	1st term	
210	Miles Taylor	D	LA-02	March 4, 1855	1st term	
211	James Thorington	O	IA-02	March 4, 1855	1st term	Left the House in 1857.
212	Lemuel Todd	O	PA-16	March 4, 1855	1st term	Left the House in 1857.
213	Mark Trafton	KN	MA-11	March 4, 1855	1st term	Left the House in 1857.
214	Robert P. Trippe	KN	GA-03	March 4, 1855	1st term	
215	Job R. Tyson	O	PA-02	March 4, 1855	1st term	Left the House in 1857.
216	Warner Underwood	KN	KY-03	March 4, 1855	1st term	
217	William Valk	KN	NY-01	March 4, 1855	1st term	Left the House in 1857.
218	Abram Wakeman	O	NY-08	March 4, 1855	1st term	Left the House in 1857.
219	David S. Walbridge	O	MI-03	March 4, 1855	1st term	
220	Henry Waldron	O	MI-02	March 4, 1855	1st term	
221	Percy Walker	KN	AL-01	March 4, 1855	1st term	Left the House in 1857.
222	Hiram B. Warner	D	GA-04	March 4, 1855	1st term	Left the House in 1857.
223	Cooper K. Watson	O	OH-09	March 4, 1855	1st term	Left the House in 1857.
224	Cadwallader C. Washburn	O	WI-02	March 4, 1855	1st term	
225	Albert G. Watkins	D	TN-01	March 4, 1855; Previous service, 1849–1853.	3rd term*	
226	William W. Welch	KN	CT-04	March 4, 1855	1st term	Left the House in 1857.
227	Thomas R. Whitney	KN	NY-05	March 4, 1855	1st term	Left the House in 1857.
228	John Williams	D	NY-29	March 4, 1855	1st term	Left the House in 1857.
229	Warren Winslow	D	NC-03	March 4, 1855	1st term	
230	John M. Wood	O	ME-01	March 4, 1855	1st term	
231	John Woodruff	KN	CT-02	March 4, 1855	1st term	Left the House in 1857.
232	James H. Woodworth	O	IL-02	March 4, 1855	1st term	Left the House in 1857.
233	John V. Wright	D	TN-07	March 4, 1855	1st term	
	Thomas P. Akers	KN	MO-05	August 18, 1856	1st term	Left the House in 1857.
	Jacob C. Davis	D	IL-05	November 4, 1856	1st term	Left the House in 1857.
	James L. D. Morrison	D	IL-08	November 4, 1856	1st term	Left the House in 1857.
	George T. Hodges	O	VT-01	December 1, 1856	1st term	Left the House in 1857.
	Muscoe R. H. Garnett	D	VA-01	December 1, 1856	1st term	

== Delegates ==
Rank	Delegate	Party	District	Seniority date (Previous service, if any)	No.# of term(s)	Notes
1	John Milton Bernhisel	D	UT	March 4, 1851	3rd term	
2	Joseph Lane	D	OR	March 4, 1851	3rd term	
3	José Manuel Gallegos	D	NM	March 4, 1853	2nd term	
4	Henry Mower Rice	D	MN	March 4, 1853	2nd term	
5	John Wilkins Whitfield	D	KS	December 20, 1854	2nd term	
6	James Patton Anderson	D	WA	March 4, 1855	1st term	
7	Bird Beers Chapman	D	NE	March 4, 1855	1st term	
	Miguel Antonio Otero	D	NM	July 23, 1856	1st term	
	John Wilkins Whitfield	D	KS	December 9, 1856; Previous service, 1854–1856.	3rd term*	

== See also ==
- 34th United States Congress
- List of United States congressional districts
- List of United States senators in the 34th Congress
