= List of United States senators in the 34th Congress =

This is a complete list of United States senators during the 34th United States Congress listed by seniority from March 4, 1855, to March 3, 1857.

Order of service is based on the commencement of the senator's first term. Behind this is former service as a senator (only giving the senator seniority within their new incoming class), service as vice president, a House member, a cabinet secretary, or a governor of a state. The final factor is the population of the senator's state.

Senators who were sworn in during the middle of the Congress (up until the last senator who was not sworn in early after winning the November 1856 election) are listed at the end of the list with no number.

== Terms of service ==
Class	Terms of service of senators that expired in years
Class 1	Terms of service of senators that expired in 1857 (CA, CT, DE, FL, IN, MA, MD, ME, MI, MO, MS, NJ, NY, OH, PA, RI, TN, TX, VA, VT, and WI.)
Class 2	Terms of service of senators that expired in 1859 (AL, AR, DE, GA, IA, IL, KY, LA, MA, ME, MI, MS, NC, NH, NJ, RI, SC, TN, and TX.)
Class 3	Terms of service of senators that expired in 1861 (AL, AR, CA, CT, FL, GA, IA, IL, IN, KY, LA, MD, MO, NC, NH, NY, OH, PA, SC, VT, and WI.)

== U.S. Senate seniority list ==
U.S. Senate seniority
Rank	Senator (party-state)	Seniority date	Other factors
1	James Alfred Pearce (D-MD)	March 4, 1843	Former representative
2	Jesse D. Bright (D-IN)	March 4, 1845	Former lieutenant governor
3	Thomas Jefferson Rusk (D-TX)	February 21, 1846	
4	Samuel Houston (D-TX)	February 26, 1846	Former representative, former governor
5	Andrew Pickens Butler (D-SC)	December 4, 1846	
6	James M. Mason (D-VA)	January 21, 1847	
7	Stephen A. Douglas (D-IL)	March 4, 1847	
8	Robert M. T. Hunter (D-VA)	March 4, 1847	Former representative
9	John Bell (D-TN)	November 22, 1847	Former representative
10	William K. Sebastian (D-AR)	May 12, 1848	
11	Henry Dodge (D-WI)	June 8, 1848	Former delegate
12	Hannibal Hamlin (D-ME)	June 8, 1848	Former representative
13	Augustus Caesar Dodge (D-IA)	December 7, 1848	Former representative
14	George Wallace Jones (D-IA)	December 7, 1848	Former delegate
15	William H. Seward (R-NY)	March 4, 1849	Former governor
16	Lewis Cass (D-MI)	March 4, 1849	
17	Thomas Pratt (D-MD)	January 12, 1850	
18	Solomon Foot (R-VT)	March 4, 1851	Former representative
19	James A. Bayard Jr. (D-DE)	March 4, 1851	
20	Stephen Mallory (D-FL)	March 4, 1851	
21	Henry S. Geyer (W-MO)	March 4, 1851	
22	Richard Brodhead(D-PA)	March 4, 1851	Former representative
23	Charles T. James (D-RI)	March 4, 1851	
24	James C. Jones (D-TN)	March 4, 1851	Former governor
25	Benjamin Wade (R-OH)	March 15, 1851	
26	Charles Sumner (LR-MA)	April 11, 1851	
27	John M. Clayton (R-NY)	December 1, 1851	
28	John B. Weller (LD-CA)	January 30, 1852	
29	Stephen Adams (D-MS)	March 17, 1852	Former representative
30	Isaac Toucey (D-CT)	May 12, 1852	
31	John R. Thomson (D-NJ)	March 4, 1853	
32	Robert Toombs (D-GA)	March 4, 1853	Former representative
33	Judah P. Benjamin (D-LA)	March 4, 1853	
34	Josiah J. Evans (D-SC)	March 4, 1853	
35	Charles E. Stuart (D-MI)	March 4, 1853	Former representative
36	John B. Thompson (KN-KY)	March 4, 1853	Former representative
37	John Middleton Clayton (W-DE)	March 4, 1853	
38	William Wright (D-NJ)	March 4, 1853	
39	Robert Ward Johnson (D-AR)	July 6, 1853	
40	Philip Allen (D-RI)	July 20, 1853	
41	Clement Claiborne Clay (D-AL)	November 29, 1853	
42	John Slidell (D-LA)	December 5, 1853	
43	Albert G. Brown (D-MS)	January 7, 1854	
44	William P. Fessenden (R-ME)	February 10, 1854	
45	David Settle Reid (D-NC)	December 6, 1854	
46	Henry Wilson (R-MA)	January 31, 1855	
47	Lyman Trumbull (R-IL)	March 4, 1855	
48	Jacob Collamer (R-VT)	March 4, 1855	
49	Lafayette S. Foster (R-CT)	March 4, 1855	
50	James Harlan (R-IA)	March 4, 1855	
51	David Levy Yulee (D-FL)	March 4, 1855	
52	Alfred Iverson, Sr. (D-GA)	March 4, 1855	
53	John Jordan Crittenden (KN-KY)	March 4, 1855	
54	George E. Pugh (D-OH)	March 4, 1855	
55	Charles Durkee (R-WI)	March 4, 1855	
56	Asa Biggs (D-NC)	March 4, 1855	
57	James Bell (R-NH)	March 4, 1855	
	John P. Hale (R-NH)	July 30, 1855	
	Benjamin Fitzpatrick (D-AL)	November 26, 1855	
	William Bigler (D-PA)	January 14, 1856	
	Joseph P. Comegys (W-DE)	November 19, 1856	
	James S. Green (D-MO)	January 12, 1857	
	William M. Gwin (D-CA)	January 13, 1857	
	Martin W. Bates (D-DE)	January 14, 1857	
	Amos Nourse (R-ME)	January 16, 1857	
	Graham N. Fitch (D-IN)	February 4, 1857	

== See also ==
- 34th United States Congress
- List of United States representatives in the 34th Congress
