= William Henry (Vermont politician) =

American manufacturer, banker and politician (1788–1861)

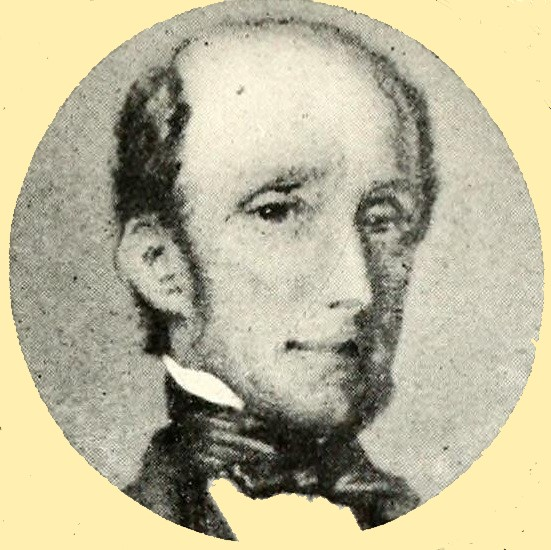
- From 1907's History of Rockingham, Vermont

Member of the United States House of Representatives for Vermont's At-large congressional district
- In office March 4, 1847 – March 3, 1851
- Preceded by: Solomon Foot
- Succeeded by: Ahiman Louis Miner

Member of the Vermont Senate from Windham County
- In office 1836–1837 Serving with Phineas White, Waitstill R. Ranney
- Preceded by: None (position created)
- Succeeded by: John Phelps, Phineas White, Waitstill R. Ranney

Member of the Vermont House of Representatives from Rockingham
- In office 1834–1836
- Preceded by: Napoleon B. Roundy
- Succeeded by: Mannesseh Divoll

Personal details
- Born: March 22, 1788 Charlestown, New Hampshire, U.S.
- Died: April 16, 1861 (aged 73) Bellows Falls, Vermont, U.S.
- Resting place: Brookside Cemetery, Chester, Vermont
- Party: Whig
- Spouse: Fanny Goodhue (m. 1816-1823, her death)
- Profession: Banker

William Henry (March 22, 1788 – April 16, 1861) was an American manufacturer and banker. He represented Vermont in the United States House of Representatives for two terms from 1847 to 1851.

== Early life and education ==
Henry was born on March 22, 1788, in Charlestown, Sullivan County, New Hampshire. He attended the common schools and then engaged in business in Chester, Vermont. He married Fanny Goodhue.

== Career ==
He engaged in manufacturing in Vermont, New York, and Jaffery, New Hampshire. When he moved to Bellows Falls, Vermont, in 1831, he engaged in banking as well.

=== Early political career ===
He served as a member of the Vermont House of Representatives in 1834; a member of the Vermont Senate in 1836.

He was a delegate from Vermont in 1839 to the Whig National Convention at Harrisburg, Pennsylvania, serving as (member, Committee on Permanent Organization; member, Balloting Committee; member, Committee to Notify Nominees); and Presidential Elector for Vermont in 1840.

He was also a director of the Rutland & Burlington Railroad Company.

=== Congress ===
Henry was elected US Representative as a Whig to the Thirtieth and Thirty-first Congresses and served from March 4, 1847, to March 3, 1851.

=== Later career ===
He was an unsuccessful candidate for election in 1852 to the Thirty-third Congress, he resumed banking. He was Presidential Elector for Vermont in 1860.

== Death ==
Henry died in Bellows Falls, Vermont, on April 16, 1861.

U.S. House of Representatives
Preceded by Solomon Foot	Member of the U.S. House of Representatives from Vermont's 1st congressional district 1847-1851	Succeeded by Ahiman L. Miner
