= E. P. Walton =

American politician, journalist and editor (1812–1890)

Eliakim Persons Walton
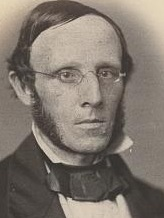

Member of the United States House of Representatives from Vermont's 1st district
- In office March 4, 1857 – March 3, 1863
- Preceded by: George Tisdale Hodges
- Succeeded by: Frederick E. Woodbridge

Member of the Vermont Senate from Washington County
- In office 1874–1878 Serving with Clark King (1st term); Ira Richardson (2nd term)
- Preceded by: Heman Carpenter, Clark King
- Succeeded by: William P. Dillingham, Albert Dwinell

Member of the Vermont House of Representatives from Montpelier
- In office 1853–1854
- Preceded by: H. H. Reed
- Succeeded by: Abijah Keith

Personal details
- Born: February 17, 1812 Montpelier, Vermont, US
- Died: December 19, 1890 (aged 78) Montpelier, Vermont, US
- Resting place: Green Mount Cemetery, Montpelier, Vermont
- Party: Whig (before 1854); Republican (from 1854)
- Spouse(s): Sarah Sophia Howes; Clara P. Snell Field
- Profession: Newspaper publisher

Eliakim "E. P. Walton" Persons Walton (February 17, 1812 – December 19, 1890) was an American journalist, editor and politician. He served as a U.S. representative from Vermont.

== Biography ==
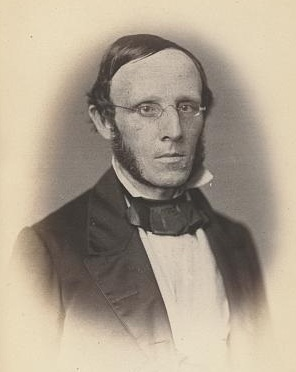

Walton was born in Montpelier, Vermont, to Ezekiel Parker Walton and Prussia Persons. He attended the common schools and the Washington County, Vermont, grammar school. He was apprenticed to a printer (publishing). He studied law under United States Senator Samuel Prentiss, a distant relative. Walton was admitted to the bar, but did not engage in the practice of law.

He was involved in journalism and was the editor of "Walton's Vermont Register". He lived in Essex, New York, from 1826 until 1827, and edited and printed his first newspaper in Essex, titled "The Essex County Republican". Walton was the organizer and first president of the Editors and Publishers' Association, holding the office of president for more than twenty years. After the retirement of his father, Eliakim Parker Walton, in 1853, he was sole proprietor of the "Vermont Watchman" until 1868.

Walton was elected to the Vermont House of Representatives as a Whig in 1853. He was elected as a Republican candidate to the Thirty-fifth, Thirty-sixth, and Thirty-seventh Congresses, serving from March 4, 1857, until March 3, 1863. He declined to be a candidate for reelection and returned to his editorial and literary labors.

In 1864, he was a delegate to the Republican National Convention, and served as a member of the State constitutional convention in 1870. He served in the Vermont State Senate from 1874 and 1878, and was a trustee of the University of Vermont and of the Vermont State Agricultural College from 1875 until 1887. He served as president of the Vermont Historical Society from 1876 until 1890. He edited Volume II of the "Collections of the Vermont Historical Society", including the Haldimand Negotiations papers, and edited eight volumes of "Records of the Governor and Council."

== Personal life ==
Walton married Sarah Sophia Howes. Following Sarah's death, he married Clara P. Snell Field.

== Death ==
Walton died on December 19, 1890, in Montpelier, Vermont. He is interred in Green Mount Cemetery in Montpelier.

U.S. House of Representatives
Preceded by George T. Hodges	Member of the U.S. House of Representatives from Vermont's 1st congressional district 1857-1863	Succeeded by Frederick E. Woodbridge
