= Marcus J. Parrott =

American politician (1828–1879)

Marcus Parrott
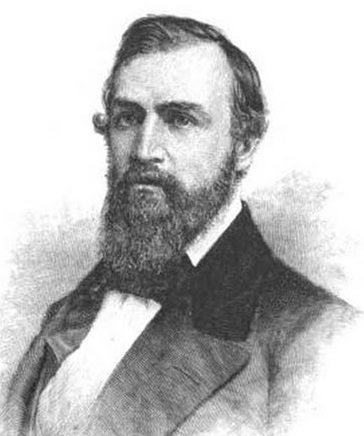

Delegate to the U.S. House of Representatives from the Kansas Territory's at-large district
- In office March 4, 1857 – January 29, 1861
- Preceded by: John Wilkins Whitfield
- Succeeded by: Martin F. Conway (Representative)

Personal details
- Born: Marcus Junius Parrott; October 27, 1828 Hamburg, South Carolina, U.S.
- Died: October 4, 1879 (aged 50) Dayton, Ohio, U.S.
- Party: Republican
- Education: Dickinson College (BA); University of Cambridge; Harvard University

Marcus Junius Parrott (October 27, 1828 – October 4, 1879) was a delegate to Congress from the Kansas Territory from 1857 until 1861.

== Biography ==
Parrott was born in Hamburg, South Carolina, on October 27, 1828. He attended the local schools, and was an 1849 graduate of Dickinson College in Carlisle, Pennsylvania. He studied at Harvard Law School in 1850 and 1851, was admitted to the Ohio bar, and settled in Dayton. He served in the Ohio House of Representatives as a Democrat in 1853 and 1854, and then moved to Leavenworth, Kansas.

In 1855, Parrott was appointed reporter of decisions for the first session of the Kansas Territory's Supreme Court. In October 1855, Parrott was elected to serve as a delegate to the territory's 1856 constitutional convention in Topeka. He was defense counsel for Governor Charles L. Robinson during his impeachment trial, and thanks to Parrott's work, Robinson won an acquittal. In 1856, he was elected as a Republican to serve as the territory's non-voting delegate to Congress. In 1857, he was a delegate to the territorial constitutional convention. He was reelected to Congress in 1858, and served in the 35th and 36th Congresses (March 4, 1857 to January 29, 1861).

Parrott's term ended when Kansas was admitted to the Union, and he was an unsuccessful candidate for election to one Kansas' two seats in the United States Senate; he lost a close race to Lane and Samuel C. Pomeroy. After leaving Congress, Parrott practiced law and farmed in Leavenworth. He ran unsuccessfully for the U.S. House of Representatives as an Independent in 1862, and as a Democrat in 1872.

Parrott returned to Dayton to live with his brother when his health began to fail in the late 1870s. He died in Dayton on October 4, 1879, and was buried at Woodland Cemetery in Dayton.

== Sources ==
=== Books ===
- Connelley, William E. (1919). A Standard History of Kansas and Kansans. Vol. 3. Chicago, IL: Lewis Historical Publishing Company.
- Harvard College (1850). Catalog of the Officers and Students of Harvard College. Cambridge, MA: Metcalf and Company.
- United States Congress (1913). A Congressional Biographical Directory, 1774-1911. Washington, DC: US Government Printing Office.

U.S. House of Representatives
Preceded by John Wilkins Whitfield	Delegate to the U.S. House of Representatives from the Kansas Territory's at-large congressional district 1857–1861	Succeeded by Martin F. Conway as U.S. Representative
