= Ahiman Louis Miner =

American politician from Vermont (1804–1886)

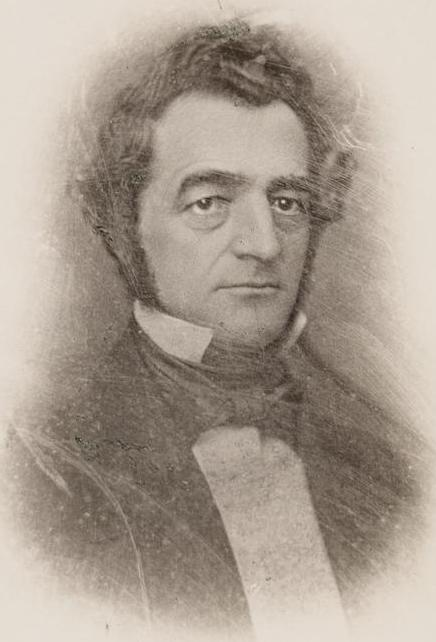

Member of the United States House of Representatives from Vermont's 1st district
- In office March 4, 1851 – March 3, 1853
- Preceded by: William Henry
- Succeeded by: James Meacham

Member of the Vermont Senate
- In office 1840

Member of the Vermont House of Representatives
- In office 1838–1839; 1846; 1853; 1861; 1865–1868

Personal details
- Born: September 23, 1804 Middletown, Vermont, US
- Died: July 19, 1886 (aged 81) Manchester, Vermont, US
- Party: Whig Party (United States)
- Spouse: Susan S. Roberts
- Children: Ahiman Louis Miners
- Profession: Politician, Lawyer

Ahiman Louis Miner (September 23, 1804 – July 19, 1886) was an American politician. He served two terms as a U.S. representative from Vermont from 1851 to 1853.

== Biography ==
Miner was born in Middletown, Rutland County, Vermont, to Gideon Lewis Miner and Rachel Davison Miner. He attended the common schools and Castleton Academy. He worked on his father's farm when he was a young man. He studied law in Poultney and Rutland, Vermont. Miner was admitted to the bar in 1832 and began the practice of law in Wallingford. He practiced law in Wallingford from 1833 until 1836.

He moved to Manchester, Vermont, in 1835 and continued the practice of law.

=== Political career ===
A. L. Miner's Signature, 09/1854

He served as clerk of the Vermont House of Representatives from 1836 until 1838. He served as a member of the Vermont House of Representatives in 1838, 1839, 1846, 1853, 1861 and from 1865 until 1868. Miner served in the Vermont Senate in 1840.

He was state's attorney for Bennington County from 1843 until 1844. He then served as register of probate for seven years, and as judge of probate from 1846 until 1849. He was a Justice of the Peace from 1846 until 1886.

==== Congress ====
Miner was elected as a Whig candidate to the Thirty-second Congress, serving from March 4, 1851, until March 3, 1853. He declined to be a candidate for renomination in 1852. After leaving Congress he resumed the practice of law.

== Death and legacy ==
Miner died on July 19, 1886, in Manchester, Vermont and was interred at Dellwood Cemetery.

The University of Vermont has a collection of papers titled "The Ahiman L. Miner Papers" that includes Miner's correspondence, legal documents and financial documents from 1800 to 1897.

U.S. House of Representatives
Preceded by William Henry	Member of the U.S. House of Representatives from Vermont's 1st congressional district 1851-1853	Succeeded by James Meacham
