= Vermont's 1st congressional district =

Obsolete congressional district

- Obsolete district
- Created: 1791; 1821; 1825
- Eliminated: 1810; 1820; 1930
- Years active: 1791–1813; 1821–1823; 1825–1933

Vermont's 1st congressional district is an obsolete district. Vermont currently has one representative to the United States House of Representatives, elected statewide at-large. Until 1933, however, the state used to have multiple seats spread out into geographic districts. During that time, the first district elected its own representative.

== List of members representing the district ==
Member	Party	Years	Cong ress	Electoral history	Location
District established March 4, 1791
Vacant		March 4, 1791 – October 16, 1791	2nd		1791–1793 "Western division"
Israel Smith (Rutland)	Anti-Administration	October 17, 1791 – March 3, 1795	2nd 3rd 4th	Elected on the second ballot in 1791. Re-elected on the second ballot in 1793. Re-elected on the second ballot in 1795. Lost re-election.	1791–1793 "Western division"
Israel Smith (Rutland)	Anti-Administration	October 17, 1791 – March 3, 1795	2nd 3rd 4th	Elected on the second ballot in 1791. Re-elected on the second ballot in 1793. Re-elected on the second ballot in 1795. Lost re-election.	1793–1803 "Western district"
Israel Smith (Rutland)	Democratic-Republican	March 4, 1795 – March 3, 1797	2nd 3rd 4th	Elected on the second ballot in 1791. Re-elected on the second ballot in 1793. Re-elected on the second ballot in 1795. Lost re-election.	1793–1803 "Western district"
Matthew Lyon (Fair Haven)	Democratic-Republican	March 4, 1797 – March 3, 1801	5th 6th	Elected on the third ballot in 1797. Re-elected on the second ballot in 1798. Retired.	1793–1803 "Western district"
Israel Smith (Rutland)	Democratic-Republican	March 4, 1801 – March 3, 1803	7th	Elected in 1800. Retired to run for U.S. senator.	1793–1803 "Western district"
Gideon Olin (Shaftsbury)	Democratic-Republican	March 4, 1803 – March 3, 1807	8th 9th	Elected in 1802. Re-elected in 1804. Retired.	1803–1813 "Southwest district"
James Witherell (Fair Haven)	Democratic-Republican	March 4, 1807 – May 1, 1808	10th	Elected in 1806. Resigned when appointed to the Michigan Territory Supreme Court.	1803–1813 "Southwest district"
Vacant		May 2, 1808 – September 5, 1808	10th		1803–1813 "Southwest district"
Samuel Shaw (Castleton)	Democratic-Republican	September 6, 1808 – March 3, 1813	10th 11th 12th	Elected September 6, 1808, to finish Witherell's term. Elected the same day to the next term. Seated November 8, 1808. Re-elected in 1810. Retired to join the military.	1803–1813 "Southwest district"
District inactive		March 4, 1813 – March 3, 1821	13th 14th 15th 16th	Vermont elected its representatives statewide at-large.	
Rollin C. Mallary (Poultney)	Democratic-Republican	March 4, 1821 – March 3, 1823	17th	Redistricted from the at-large district and re-elected in 1820. Redistricted to the at-large district.	1821–1823; The entire county of Bennington, and all the towns in Rutland county, excepting Orwell, Sudbury, Brandon, Pittsfield, Chittenden, Pittsford, Hubbardton and Benson.
District inactive		March 4, 1823 – March 3, 1825	18th	Vermont elected its representatives statewide at-large.	
William C. Bradley (Westminster)	Anti-Jacksonian	March 4, 1825 – March 3, 1827	19th	Redistricted from the at-large district and re-elected in 1824. Lost re-election.	1825–1833 [data missing]
Jonathan Hunt (Brattleboro)	Anti-Jacksonian	March 4, 1827 – May 15, 1832	20th 21st 22nd	Elected in 1827 on the third ballot. Re-elected in 1828. Died.	1825–1833 [data missing]
Vacant		May 16, 1832 – December 31, 1832	22nd		1825–1833 [data missing]
Hiland Hall (Bennington)	Anti-Jacksonian	January 1, 1833 – March 3, 1837	22nd 23rd 24th 25th 26th 27th	Elected in 1833 to finish Hunt's term on the fourth ballot. Re-elected in 1834. Re-elected in 1836. Re-elected in 1838 as a Whig. Re-elected in 1840. Retired to become State Banking Commissioner.	1825–1833 [data missing]
Hiland Hall (Bennington)	Anti-Jacksonian	January 1, 1833 – March 3, 1837	22nd 23rd 24th 25th 26th 27th	Elected in 1833 to finish Hunt's term on the fourth ballot. Re-elected in 1834. Re-elected in 1836. Re-elected in 1838 as a Whig. Re-elected in 1840. Retired to become State Banking Commissioner.	1833–1843 [data missing]
Hiland Hall (Bennington)	Whig	March 4, 1837 – March 3, 1843	22nd 23rd 24th 25th 26th 27th	Elected in 1833 to finish Hunt's term on the fourth ballot. Re-elected in 1834. Re-elected in 1836. Re-elected in 1838 as a Whig. Re-elected in 1840. Retired to become State Banking Commissioner.	1833–1843 [data missing]
Solomon Foot (Rutland)	Whig	March 4, 1843 – March 3, 1847	28th 29th	Elected in 1843. Re-elected in 1844. Retired.	1843–1853 [data missing]
William Henry (Bellows Falls)	Whig	March 4, 1847 – March 3, 1851	30th 31st	Elected in 1846. Re-elected in 1848. Lost re-election.	1843–1853 [data missing]
Ahiman L. Miner (Manchester)	Whig	March 4, 1851 – March 3, 1853	32nd	Elected in 1850. Retired.	1843–1853 [data missing]
James Meacham (Middlebury)	Whig	March 4, 1853 – March 3, 1855	33rd 34th	Redistricted from the 3rd district and re-elected in 1852. Re-elected in 1854. Died.	1853–1863 [data missing]
James Meacham (Middlebury)	Opposition	March 4, 1855 – August 23, 1856	33rd 34th	Redistricted from the 3rd district and re-elected in 1852. Re-elected in 1854. Died.	1853–1863 [data missing]
Vacant		August 24, 1856 – November 30, 1856	34th		1853–1863 [data missing]
George T. Hodges (Rutland)	Republican	December 1, 1856 – March 3, 1857	34th	Elected to finish Meacham's term. Retired.	1853–1863 [data missing]
Eliakim P. Walton (Montpelier)	Republican	March 4, 1857 – March 3, 1863	35th 36th 37th	Elected in 1856. Re-elected in 1858. Re-elected in 1860. Retired.	1853–1863 [data missing]
Frederick E. Woodbridge (Vergennes)	Republican	March 4, 1863 – March 3, 1869	38th 39th 40th	Elected in 1862. Re-elected in 1864. Re-elected in 1866. Retired.	1863–1873 [data missing]
Charles W. Willard (Montpelier)	Republican	March 4, 1869 – March 3, 1875	41st 42nd 43rd	Elected in 1868. Re-elected in 1870. Re-elected in 1872. Lost re-election.	1863–1873 [data missing]
Charles W. Willard (Montpelier)	Republican	March 4, 1869 – March 3, 1875	41st 42nd 43rd	Elected in 1868. Re-elected in 1870. Re-elected in 1872. Lost re-election.	1873–1883 [data missing]
Charles H. Joyce (Rutland)	Republican	March 4, 1875 – March 3, 1883	44th 45th 46th 47th	Elected in 1874. Re-elected in 1876. Re-elected in 1878. Re-elected in 1880. Retired.	1873–1883 [data missing]
John W. Stewart (Middlebury)	Republican	March 4, 1883 – March 3, 1891	48th 49th 50th 51st	Elected in 1882. Re-elected in 1884. Re-elected in 1886. Re-elected in 1888. Retired.	1883–1893 [data missing]
H. Henry Powers (Morrisville)	Republican	March 4, 1891 – March 3, 1901	52nd 53rd 54th 55th 56th	Elected in 1890. Re-elected in 1892. Re-elected in 1894. Re-elected in 1896. Re-elected in 1898. Lost re-election.	1883–1893 [data missing]
H. Henry Powers (Morrisville)	Republican	March 4, 1891 – March 3, 1901	52nd 53rd 54th 55th 56th	Elected in 1890. Re-elected in 1892. Re-elected in 1894. Re-elected in 1896. Re-elected in 1898. Lost re-election.	1893–1903 [data missing]
David J. Foster (Burlington)	Republican	March 4, 1901 – March 21, 1912	57th 58th 59th 60th 61st 62nd	Elected in 1900. Re-elected in 1902. Re-elected in 1904. Re-elected in 1906. Re-elected in 1908. Re-elected in 1910. Died.	1893–1903 [data missing]
David J. Foster (Burlington)	Republican	March 4, 1901 – March 21, 1912	57th 58th 59th 60th 61st 62nd	Elected in 1900. Re-elected in 1902. Re-elected in 1904. Re-elected in 1906. Re-elected in 1908. Re-elected in 1910. Died.	1903–1913 [data missing]
Vacant		March 22, 1912 – July 29, 1912	62nd		1903–1913 [data missing]
Frank L. Greene (St. Albans)	Republican	July 30, 1912 – March 3, 1923	62nd 63rd 64th 65th 66th 67th	Elected to finish Foster's term. Re-elected in 1912. Re-elected in 1914. Re-elected in 1916. Re-elected in 1918. Re-elected in 1920. Retired to run for U.S. senator.	1903–1913 [data missing]
Frank L. Greene (St. Albans)	Republican	July 30, 1912 – March 3, 1923	62nd 63rd 64th 65th 66th 67th	Elected to finish Foster's term. Re-elected in 1912. Re-elected in 1914. Re-elected in 1916. Re-elected in 1918. Re-elected in 1920. Retired to run for U.S. senator.	1913–1933 [data missing]
Frederick G. Fleetwood (Morrisville)	Republican	March 4, 1923 – March 3, 1925	68th	Elected in 1922. Retired.	1913–1933 [data missing]
Elbert S. Brigham (St. Albans)	Republican	March 4, 1925 – March 3, 1931	69th 70th 71st	Elected in 1924. Re-elected in 1926. Re-elected in 1928. Retired.	1913–1933 [data missing]
John E. Weeks (Middlebury)	Republican	March 4, 1931 – March 3, 1933	72nd	Elected in 1930. Retired.	1913–1933 [data missing]
District dissolved March 3, 1933
