= Joseph R. Chandler =

American politician

Joseph Ripley Chandler
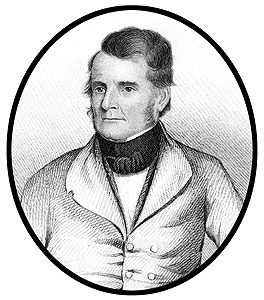

United States Ambassador to the Two Sicilies
- In office June 15, 1858 – November 15, 1860
- President: James Buchanan
- Preceded by: Robert Dale Owen
- Succeeded by: Embassy closed

Member of the U.S. House of Representatives from Pennsylvania's 2nd district
- In office March 4, 1849 – March 3, 1855
- Preceded by: Joseph R. Ingersoll
- Succeeded by: Job R. Tyson

Personal details
- Born: August 22, 1792 Kingston, Massachusetts
- Died: July 10, 1880 (aged 87)
- Party: Whig

Joseph Ripley Chandler (August 22, 1792 – July 10, 1880) was a Whig member of the U.S. House of Representatives from Pennsylvania.

== Early life and journalism ==
Joseph R. Chandler was born in Kingston, Massachusetts. He was engaged in commercial work in Boston, Massachusetts, and moved to Philadelphia, Pennsylvania, in 1815. He founded a young ladies' seminary and worked as editor of the United States Gazette from 1822 to 1847. For a short time, he was an editorial assistant at Graham's Magazine in 1848.

== Politics ==
Chandler was a member of the Philadelphia City Council from 1832 to 1848, and a member of the State constitutional convention in 1837. He was elected as a Whig to the Thirty-first, Thirty-second, and Thirty-third Congresses. He was a leading opponent of the Kansas-Nebraska Act.

In 1854, Chandler, who had recently converted to Catholicism, failed to receive a single vote for renomination at the 2nd District Whig convention, and Job Roberts Tyson was nominated instead. Chandler was nominated by the Independent Whigs of the Second Congressional District, who were opposed to the Know Nothing influence on the Whig Party. Chandler finished a distant third behind Tyson and Democrat John Hamilton. During a lame duck session of the Thirty-third Congress, he delivered an address defending American Catholics against the Know Nothings.

In 1855, Chandler joined the Democratic Party, but never again ran for elected office. He was appointed by President James Buchanan as Minister to the Two Sicilies and served from June 15, 1858, to November 15, 1860.

== Personal life ==
Chandler's first wife, Mary, died in 1832. On July 3, 1833, he married Anna Maria Holton Jones, a Catholic originally from Baltimore. Raised as a Baptist, Chandler converted to the Catholic Church after the 1852 election. His conversion is cited by Saint Joseph's University professor of history Frank Gerrity as the reason for his failed reelection in 1854.

Prior to joining the Catholic church, Chandler was a freemason and served as grand master of the Grand Lodge of Pennsylvania from 1841 to 1842.

== Later life ==
Chandler served as president of the board of directors of Girard College. He became interested in prison reform and was a delegate to the International Prison Congress held at London in 1872. He died in 1880 in Philadelphia, where he was interred in New Cathedral Cemetery.

U.S. House of Representatives
Preceded by Joseph R. Ingersoll	Member of the U.S. House of Representatives from Pennsylvania's 2nd congressional district 1849–1855	Succeeded by Job R. Tyson
Diplomatic posts
Preceded by Robert Dale Owen	United States Ambassador (as Minister Resident) to the Two Sicilies; 1858–1860	Succeeded by Embassy closed
