= George T. Hodges =

American politician (1789-1860)

George Tisdale Hodges
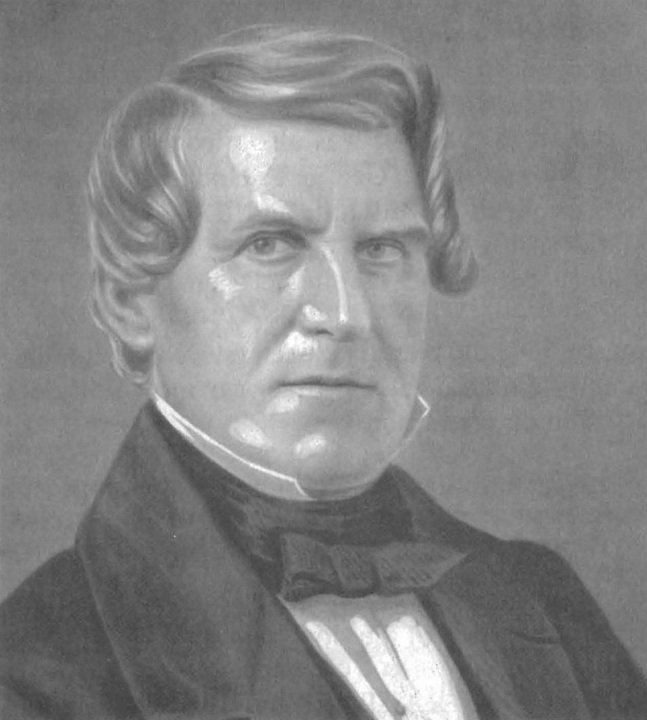

Member of the U.S. House of Representatives from Vermont's 1st district
- In office December 1, 1856 – March 3, 1857
- Preceded by: James Meacham
- Succeeded by: Eliakim Persons Walton

Member of the Vermont Senate
- In office 1845–1847

Member of the Vermont House of Representatives
- In office 1827–1829; 1839–1840

Personal details
- Born: July 4, 1789 Clarendon, Vermont Republic
- Died: August 9, 1860 (aged 71) Rutland, Vermont, U.S.
- Resting place: Evergreen Cemetery; Rutland, Vermont
- Citizenship: US
- Party: Whig; Republican
- Spouse: Emily Bliss Hodges
- Children: Lorain Hodges; Mary Elizabeth Hodges; Miriam L. Hodges; Caroline Keith Hodges; George Hodges; Emily Hodges Townsend; James Bliss Hodges; John H. Hodges
- Profession: Lawyer; Banker; Politician

George Tisdale Hodges (July 4, 1789 – August 9, 1860) was an American politician who served as a U.S. representative from Vermont. He was the first Republican member of the United States House of Representatives, although there was a similar Opposition Party.

== Early life ==
Hodges was born in Clarendon in the Vermont Republic and attended the common schools.

== Career ==
Involved in the banking industry in Rutland, Vermont, Hodges served as president of the Bank of Rutland for over twenty-five years.

Hodges served as a member of the Vermont House of Representatives from 1827 to 1829, 1839 and 1840. He served in the Vermont State Senate from 1845 to 1847 and was President pro tempore in 1846 and 1847.

A Whig Presidential Elector for Vermont in 1848, Hodges became a Republican when that party was founded. In 1856, he was elected to the Thirty-fourth Congress to fill the vacancy caused by the death of James Meacham. He served from December 1, 1856, to March 3, 1857. He was not a candidate for renomination in 1856.

== Death ==
Hodges died on August 9, 1860, in Rutland. He is interred at Evergreen Cemetery in Rutland.

U.S. House of Representatives
Preceded by James Meacham	Member of the U.S. House of Representatives from Vermont's 1st congressional district 1856-1857	Succeeded by Eliakim P. Walton
