= Kansas Territory's at-large congressional district =

Former congressional district

- Obsolete district
- Created: 1854, as a non-voting delegate was granted by Congress
- Eliminated: 1861, as a result of statehood
- Years active: 1854–1861

From the 33rd Congress through the 36th Congress, Kansas Territory elected a non-voting delegate to the United States House of Representatives.

== List of members representing the district ==
Delegate (District home)	Party	Years	Cong ress	Electoral history
John Wilkins Whitfield (Tecumseh)	Democratic	December 20, 1854 – August 1, 1856	33rd 34th	Elected in 1854. Elected in 1855. Seat was declared vacant.
Vacant		August 2, 1856 – December 8, 1856	34th	
John Wilkins Whitfield (Tecumseh)	Democratic	December 9, 1856 – March 3, 1857	34th	Elected to finish his own term. Retired.
Marcus Junius Parrott (Leavenworth)	Republican	March 4, 1857 – January 29, 1861	35th 36th	Elected in 1856 or 1857. (Note: Specific date unknown.); Re-elected in 1858 or 1859. Kansas admitted as a state.
