= John Wilkins Whitfield =

American politician (1818–1879)

John Whitfield
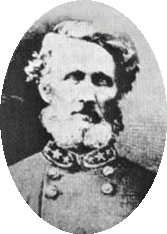

Delegate to the U.S. House of Representatives from the Kansas Territory's at-large district
- In office December 20, 1854 – August 1, 1856
- Preceded by: Constituency established
- Succeeded by: Seat vacated
- In office December 9, 1856 – March 3, 1857
- Preceded by: Seat vacant
- Succeeded by: Marcus Parrott

Personal details
- Born: John Wilkins Whitfield; March 11, 1818 Franklin, Tennessee, U.S.
- Died: October 27, 1879 (aged 61) Hallettsville, Texas, U.S.
- Party: Democratic

Military service
- Allegiance: United States (Confederate States of America) Confederate States
- Branch/service: United States Army; Confederate States Army
- Years of service: 1846 (United States); 1861–1865 (Confederate States)
- Rank: Lieutenant Colonel (United States); Brigadier General (Confederate States)
- Commands: 27th Texas Cavalry Regiment • Whitfield's Brigade
- Battles/wars: Mexican–American War; American Civil War

John Wilkins Whitfield (March 11, 1818 – October 27, 1879) was a territorial delegate to the United States House of Representatives who represented Kansas Territory from 1854 until 1856. He was an officer in the Confederate Army during the American Civil War, being commissioned as a brigadier general on May 9, 1863.

== Biography ==
Whitfield was born in Franklin, Williamson County, Tennessee. He served in the Mexican–American War as a lieutenant colonel in 1846. He moved to Independence, Missouri, in 1853 to serve as Indian agent to the Pottawatomies at Westport, Missouri, and to the Arkansas Indians in 1855 and 1856.

Upon the admission of the Territory of Kansas to representation Whitfield was elected as a Democrat to the Thirty-third Congress and began his term on December 20, 1854. In October 1855, he was re-elected as delegate and served until August 1, 1856, when the seat was declared vacant on the grounds that "the people of the Territory of Kansas have been deprived of the power to make a strictly legal election of a Delegate by an invasion from Missouri, which subverted their Territorial government and annihilated its legislative power." He was again elected to the 34th Congress to fill the vacancy caused by the action of the House of Representatives in declaring the seat vacant. This seat was also contested and though the Committee on Elections recommended that Whitfield again be declared not entitled to the seat because non-residents voted and that many actual Kansans were disenfranchised, the full house narrowly decided to table the resolution. Whitfield served provisionally from December 9, 1856, to March 3, 1857. He then retired from Congress and became the Register of the Land Office at Doniphan, Kansas, 1857–1861.

Whitfield served as captain of the 27th Texas Cavalry Regiment at the start of the civil war in 1861, commanded the unit as Colonel in 1862 and was promoted to the rank of brigadier general in 1863.

He settled in Lavaca County, Texas, after the war and engaged in agricultural pursuits and stock raising and served in the Texas House of Representatives. He died in Hallettsville, Texas, in 1879, where he is buried.

== See also ==
- List of American Civil War generals (Confederate)

== Notes ==
U.S. House of Representatives
New constituency	Delegate to the U.S. House of Representatives from the Kansas Territory's at-large congressional district 1854–1856	Vacant Title next held by Himself
Vacant Title last held by Himself	Delegate to the U.S. House of Representatives from the Kansas Territory's at-large congressional district 1856–1857	Succeeded by Marcus Parrott
