= Joseph P. Comegys =

American politician

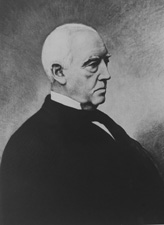

Chief Justice of Delaware
- In office May 18, 1876 – January 26, 1893
- Preceded by: Edward W. Gilpin
- Succeeded by: Alfred P. Robinson

United States Senator from Delaware
- In office November 19, 1856 – January 14, 1857
- Appointed by: Peter F. Causey
- Preceded by: John M. Clayton
- Succeeded by: Martin W. Bates

Member of the Delaware House of Representatives
- In office January 3, 1843 – January 2, 1845; January 2, 1849 – January 1, 1851

Personal details
- Born: December 29, 1813 Dover, Delaware
- Died: February 1, 1893 (aged 79) Dover, Delaware
- Party: Whig; Democratic
- Spouse: Margaret A. Douglass
- Profession: Lawyer

Joseph Parsons Comegys (December 29, 1813 – February 1, 1893) was an American judge, lawyer and politician from Dover, in Kent County, Delaware. He was a member of the Whig Party and later the Democratic Party, who served in the Delaware General Assembly, as a U.S. senator from Delaware, and later as the chief justice of the Delaware Supreme Court.

== Early life and family ==
Comegys was born at "Cherbourg," in Kent County, Delaware, near Dover, the son of former Governor Cornelius P. Comegys and Ruhamah Marim. He attended the old academy at Dover, studied law with John M. Clayton, was admitted to the bar in 1835 and commenced practice in Dover. He married Clayton's niece, Margaret A. Douglass and had three children.

== Professional and political career ==
Comegys was elected as a member of the State House twice, and served in the 1843/44 and 1849/50 sessions. He was also a member of the commission to revise the State Constitution in 1852. On November 19, 1856, he was appointed to the U.S. Senate, to fill the vacancy caused by the death of John M. Clayton. He did not run again, and served until January 14, 1857, when his successor was elected. After many years in private practice he was appointed chief justice of the State Supreme Court on May 18, 1876, and served until January 26, 1893, just before his death.

== Death and legacy ==
Comegys died at Dover and is buried there in the Old Presbyterian Cemetery, on the grounds of the Delaware State Museum.

== Images ==
- Biographical Directory of the United States Congress; portrait courtesy of the Library of Congress.

== Almanac ==
Elections are held the first Tuesday after November 1. Members of the Delaware General Assembly took office the first Tuesday of January. State Representatives have a two-year term. The General Assembly chose the U.S. senators, who took office March 4 for a six-year term. They also chose the delegates to the Constitutional Convention of 1852.

Public offices
Office	Type	Location	Began office	Ended office	Notes
State Representative	Legislature	Dover	January 3, 1843	January 2, 1845	
State Representative	Legislature	Dover	January 2, 1849	January 1, 1851	
Delegate	Convention	Dover	1852	1852	State Constitution
U.S. Senator	Legislature	Washington	November 19, 1856	January 14, 1857	
Supreme Court	Judiciary	Dover	May 18, 1876	January 26, 1893	Chief Justice

Delaware General Assembly service
Dates	Congress	Chamber	Majority	Governor	Committees	Class/District
1843/44	62nd	State House	Whig	William B. Cooper		Kent at-large
1849/50	65th	State Senate	Whig	William Tharp		Kent at-large

United States congressional service
Dates	Congress	Chamber	Majority	President	Committees	Class/District
1856–1857	34th	U.S. Senate	Democratic	Franklin Pierce		class 2

U.S. Senate
Preceded by John M. Clayton	U.S. senator from Delaware; 1856–1857	Succeeded by Martin W. Bates
