= Martin W. Bates =

American lawyer and politician

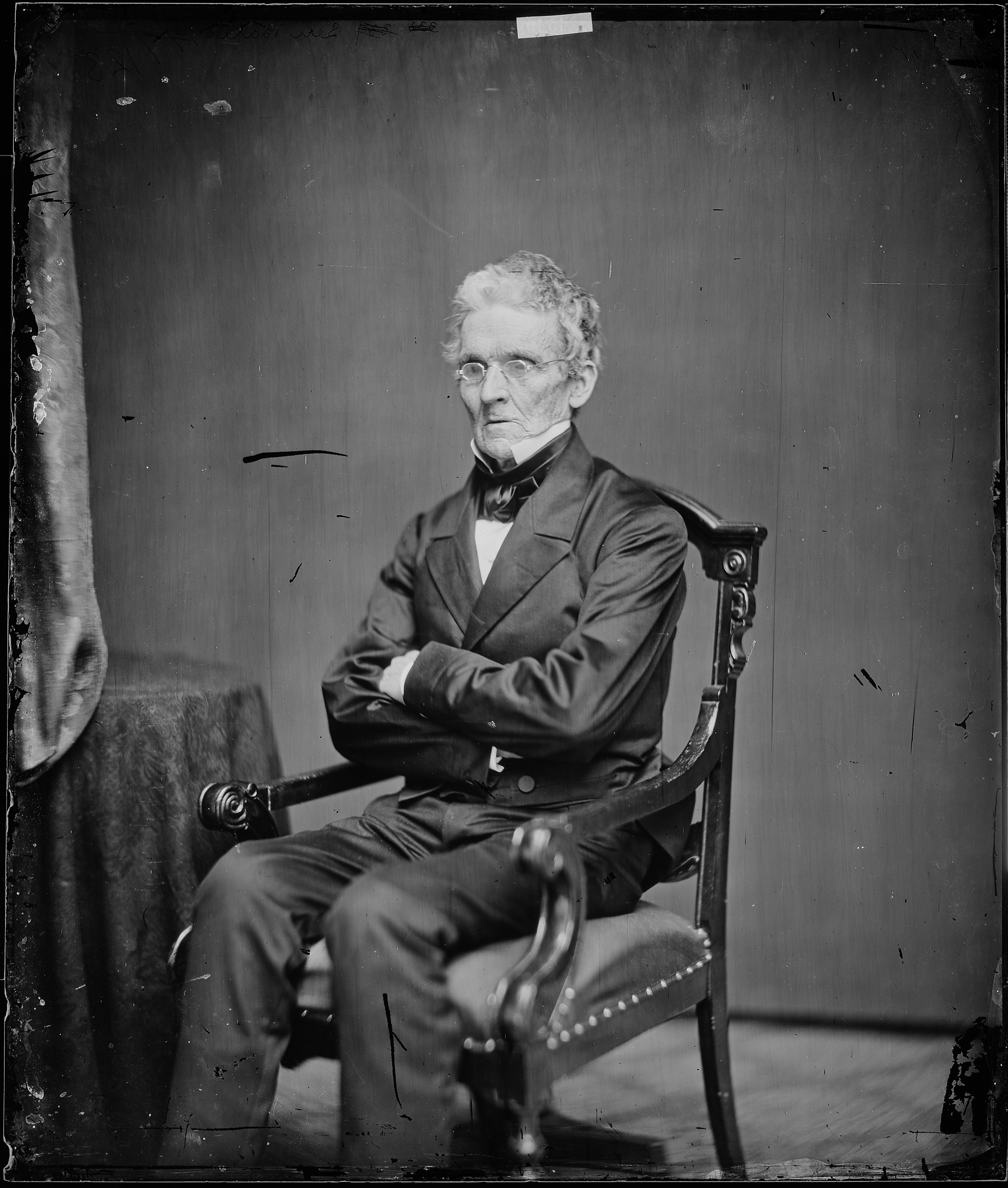

United States Senator from Delaware
- In office January 14, 1857 – March 3, 1859
- Preceded by: Joseph P. Comegys
- Succeeded by: Willard Saulsbury Sr.

Member of the Delaware House of Representatives
- In office January 5, 1819 – January 4, 1820; January 3, 1826 – January 1, 1828

Personal details
- Born: February 24, 1786 Salisbury, Connecticut
- Died: January 1, 1869 (aged 82) Dover, Delaware
- Party: Federalist; Democratic
- Spouse: Mary Hillyard
- Profession: Lawyer

Martin Waltham Bates (February 24, 1786 – January 1, 1869) was a lawyer and politician from Dover, in Kent County, Delaware. He was a member of the Federalist Party, and then the Democratic Party, who served in the Delaware General Assembly and as U.S. Senator from Delaware.

== Early life and family ==
Bates was born in Salisbury, Connecticut. He married Mary Hillyard, the daughter of Charles Hillyard. They lived in Dover, at "Woodburn", presently the Delaware Governor's mansion, and were members of the Presbyterian Church. After moving to Delaware, Bates taught school, studied medicine and the law. He was admitted to the Bar in 1822, and practiced in Dover the remainder of his life.

== Political career ==
Bates served in the State House in the 1826 session and was a member of the Delaware Constitutional Convention of 1852. He became U.S. Senator in 1857 when he was elected by the General Assembly to fill the vacancy caused by the death of U.S. Senator John M. Clayton, which had been briefly filled by the appointment of Joseph P. Comegys. He served only the remainder of the term, from January 14, 1857, to March 3, 1859, as he was defeated for reelection in 1858 by Willard Saulsbury Sr.

== Death and legacy ==
Bates died at Dover and is buried there in the Old Presbyterian Cemetery, on the grounds of the Delaware State Museum.

== Almanac ==
Elections were held the first Tuesday of October. Members of the General Assembly took office on the first Tuesday of January. State Representatives had a term of one year. The General Assembly chose the U.S. senators, who took office March 4 for a six-year term. They also chose the delegates to the Constitutional Convention of 1852.

Public offices
Office	Type	Location	Began office	Ended office	Notes
State Representative	Legislature	Dover	January 5, 1819	January 4, 1820	
State Representative	Legislature	Dover	January 3, 1826	January 2, 1827	
State Representative	Legislature	Dover	January 2, 1827	January 1, 1828	
Delegate	Convention	Dover	1852	1852	State Constitution
U.S. Senator	Legislature	Washington	January 14, 1857	March 3, 1859	

Delaware General Assembly service
Dates	Congress	Chamber	Majority	Governor	Committees	Class/District
1819	62nd	State House	Federalist	Jacob Stout		Kent at-large
1826	65th	State House	Federalist	Charles Polk Jr.		Kent at-large
1827	65th	State House	Federalist	Charles Polk Jr.		Kent at-large

United States congressional service
Dates	Congress	Chamber	Majority	President	Committees	Class/District
1856–1857	34th	U.S. Senate	Democratic	Franklin Pierce		class 2
1857–1859	35th	U.S. Senate	Democratic	James Buchanan		class 2

U.S. Senate
Preceded by Joseph P. Comegys	U.S. senator (Class 2) from Delaware; January 14, 1857 – March 3, 1859; Served alongside: James A. Bayard Jr.	Succeeded by Willard Saulsbury Sr.
