= James Meacham =

American politician, minister and professor (1810–1856)

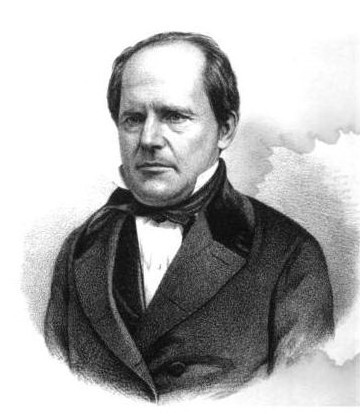

Member of the U.S. House of Representatives from Vermont
- In office December 3, 1849 – August 23, 1856
- Preceded by: George P. Marsh (3rd); Ahiman L. Miner (1st)
- Succeeded by: Alvah Sabin (3rd); George T. Hodges (1st)
- Constituency: 3rd district (1849-53); 1st district (1853-56)

Personal details
- Born: August 16, 1810 Rutland Town, Vermont, US
- Died: August 23, 1856 (aged 46) Rutland Town, Vermont
- Party: Whig
- Spouse(s): Caroline Eliza Bottum (m. 1842-1843, her death); Mary Gifford (m. 1845-1856, his death)
- Children: 3
- Education: Middlebury College; Andover Theological Seminary
- Profession: Clergyman

James Meacham (August 16, 1810 – August 23, 1856) was an American politician, minister and professor. He served as a U.S. representative from Vermont from 1849 until his death.

== Early life ==
Meacham was born in Rutland Town, Vermont to Lewis and Naomi Eayres Meacham. He attended the academy in St. Albans, Vermont and graduated from Middlebury College in 1832. He and taught at Castleton Seminary from 1832 to 1833 and St. Albans Academy from 1833 until 1834. He was a tutor at Middlebury College from 1836 until 1838.

From 1834 until 1836, Meacham studied for the ministry at Andover Theological Seminary. He was ordained as a Congregational minister in 1838 and assumed duties as pastor of the church in New Haven, Vermont, where he served 1839 to 1846. He was also a tutor and professor of Rhetoric and English Literature at Middlebury College from 1846 to 1850.

== Political career ==
Meacham was elected to Congress as a Whig in 1849 and filled the vacancy caused by the resignation of George P. Marsh during the 31st United States Congress. Meacham was reelected to the 32nd and 33rd Congresses. In 1854 he was reelected to the 34th United States Congress as an Whig candidate. He served in Congress from December 3, 1849 until his death on August 23, 1856. Meacham was chairman for the Committee on the District of Columbia in the 34th Congress.

He was a trustee of Middlebury College from 1855 until 1856, and was a regent at the Smithsonian Institution from 1852 until 1856.

== Personal life ==
Meacham married Caroline Bottum on May 17, 1842. They had one child, Elias B. (1843–1844). Following Caroline's 1843 death, on February 20, 1845 Meacham married Mary Gifford. They were the parents of two children, Emma P., the wife of William H. Davis, and Lewis Henry (1846–1878).

== Death and burial ==
Meacham died in Rutland on August 23, 1856. He was interred at West Cemetery in Middlebury.

== See also ==
- List of members of the United States Congress who died in office (1790–1899)

U.S. House of Representatives
Preceded by George P. Marsh	Member of the U.S. House of Representatives from Vermont's 3rd congressional district 1849-1853	Succeeded by Alvah Sabin
Preceded by Ahiman L. Miner	Member of the U.S. House of Representatives from Vermont's 1st congressional district 1853-1856	Succeeded by George T. Hodges
