= Job Roberts Tyson =

American politician (1803-1858)

Job Tyson

Member of the U.S. House of Representatives from Pennsylvania
- In office March 4, 1855 – March 3, 1857
- Preceded by: Joseph Ripley Chandler
- Succeeded by: Edward Joy Morris
- Constituency: 2nd district

Member of the Pennsylvania House of Representatives

Personal details
- Born: February 8, 1803 Philadelphia, Pennsylvania, U.S.
- Died: June 27, 1858 (aged 55) Montgomery County, Pennsylvania, U.S.
- Resting place: Laurel Hill Cemetery, Philadelphia, Pennsylvania, U.S.
- Party: Whig
- Profession: Lawyer

Job Roberts Tyson (February 8, 1803 – June 27, 1858) was an American politician who served as a Whig member of the U.S. House of Representatives for Pennsylvania's 2nd congressional district from 1855 to 1857.

== Early life and education ==
Tyson was born on February 8, 1803, in Philadelphia, Pennsylvania, to Joseph Tyson and Ann Van Tromp. He was descended from a Quaker family that settled in the Pennsylvania colony in 1683.

He worked as a clerk in a store and attended the common schools. At the age of 17, he worked as a teacher in Hamburg, Pennsylvania, and taught English to German speaking students of the area. In doing so, he also learned to speak German himself.

After returning to Philadelphia, Roberts Vaux, an early founder of the public school system, helped him obtain work as a teacher in the first public school in Philadelphia. He also devoted himself to study and learned Latin, Greek and Hebrew. After two years, he was appointed as the Director of Public Schools in Philadelphia. He worked in the prison system, for the apprentice's library and helped organize the temperance movement in Pennsylvania.

In 1825, he began the study of law under John Wurts. He was admitted to the bar in 1827 and practiced law in Philadelphia. In 1851, he received a LL.D. degree from Dickinson College.

== Career ==
Tyson often wrote and spoke about history and law. The Law Academy of Philadelphia published an essay he wrote about the penal system of Philadelphia. He delivered speeches on the trial of William Penn and the history of Pennsylvania. He worked as a lawyer for the Pennsylvania Railroad.

In 1833, he was commissioned by Philadelphians concerned about gambling to write about the problems of lotteries. Lotteries at the time were a common means of raising funds for public and private projects. Benjamin Franklin was involved in organizing the first public lottery in Philadelphia and used them for establishing fire companies and a militia. Tyson wrote several works on the subject including A Brief Survey of the Great Extent and Evil Tendencies of the Lottery System, as Existing in the United States in 1833 and The Lottery System in the United States in 1837 that argued for the end of lotteries as a destructive human behavior. Although the movement against lotteries began with the Quakers, other denominations came out against lotteries with Tyson’s forceful argument against the practice. Nine states eventually banned lotteries by 1835 and new states barred lotteries in their constitutions.

In 1836, he was elected a member of the American Philosophical Society. He served as vice-president of the Historical Society of Pennsylvania and as vice-provost of the Law Academy of Philadelphia.

In 1840, He served in the Pennsylvania House of Representatives. In 1846, Tyson began speaking about the need for a railroad connection between Philadelphia and Pittsburgh. He delivered an address on April 28, 1846 to a group of influential citizens and continued to press the issue. Tyson was elected to the Select Council, the upper house of the Philadelphia City Council and pushed the city towards the establishment of what became the Pennsylvania Railroad.

In 1854, Tyson was elected as a Whig to the Thirty-fourth Congress. As a member of Congress, he spoke forcefully in favor of the expulsion of Preston Brooks, who had assaulted Senator Charles Sumner. He also passed a resolution for Congress to fund the publication of a book on Elisha Kent Kane's arctic exploration.

In 1857, he delivered a speech on fugitive slaves laws in which he argued for a return to the principles of the Compromise of 1850. He noted that while he opposed slavery, Tyson argued that Africans, born free or as slaves, were better off, “elevated in character, and improved in condition and happiness, by his residence among a religious, an educated and a free people.” Further, he stated that “The natural inferiority of the negro is physically and metaphysically, a fact.”

== Personal life ==
Tyson married Eleanor Cope on October 4, 1832. They had no children together and she died in 1847 He died on his estate, "Woodlawn," in Montgomery County, Pennsylvania, on June 27, 1858, and was interred in Laurel Hill Cemetery in Philadelphia.

== Publications ==
- An Address, delivered at the request of the Board of Managers of the Apprentices' Library Company of Philadelphia, in the Hall of the Franklin Institute, on the 26th March 1830, Philadelphia: John Young, 1830
- A Brief Survey of the Great Extent and Evil Tendencies of the Lottery System, as Existing in the United States, Philadelphia: William Brown, 1833
- Memoir of Thomas C. James, M.D. One of the Vice Presidents of the Historical Society of Pennsylvania, Philadelphia: M'Carty & Davis, 1835
- Discourse Delivered Before the Historical Society of Pennsylvania, February 21, 1842, on the Colonial History of the Eastern and Some of the Southern States, Philadelphia: John Penington, 1842
- Discourse on the Two Hundredth Anniversary of the Birth of William Penn - Delivered in the Independence Hall at Philadelphia, on 24th October, 1844, Before the Historical Society of Pennsylvania, Philadelphia: John Penington, 1845
- Discourse on History as a Branch of the National Literature Delivered Before the Belles Lettres Society of Dickinson College, Philadelphia: T.K. and P.G. Collins, 1849
- Letters on the Resources and Commerce of Philadelphia, Philadelphia: C. Sherman, 1852
- Address Delivered Before the Montgomery County Agricultural Society, Philadelphia: C. Sherman & Son, 1856

U.S. House of Representatives
Preceded by Joseph R. Chandler	Member of the U.S. House of Representatives from Pennsylvania's 2nd congressional district 1855–1857	Succeeded by Edward J. Morris
