= 34th United States Congress =

1855-1857 U.S. Congress

←	33rd	35th	→
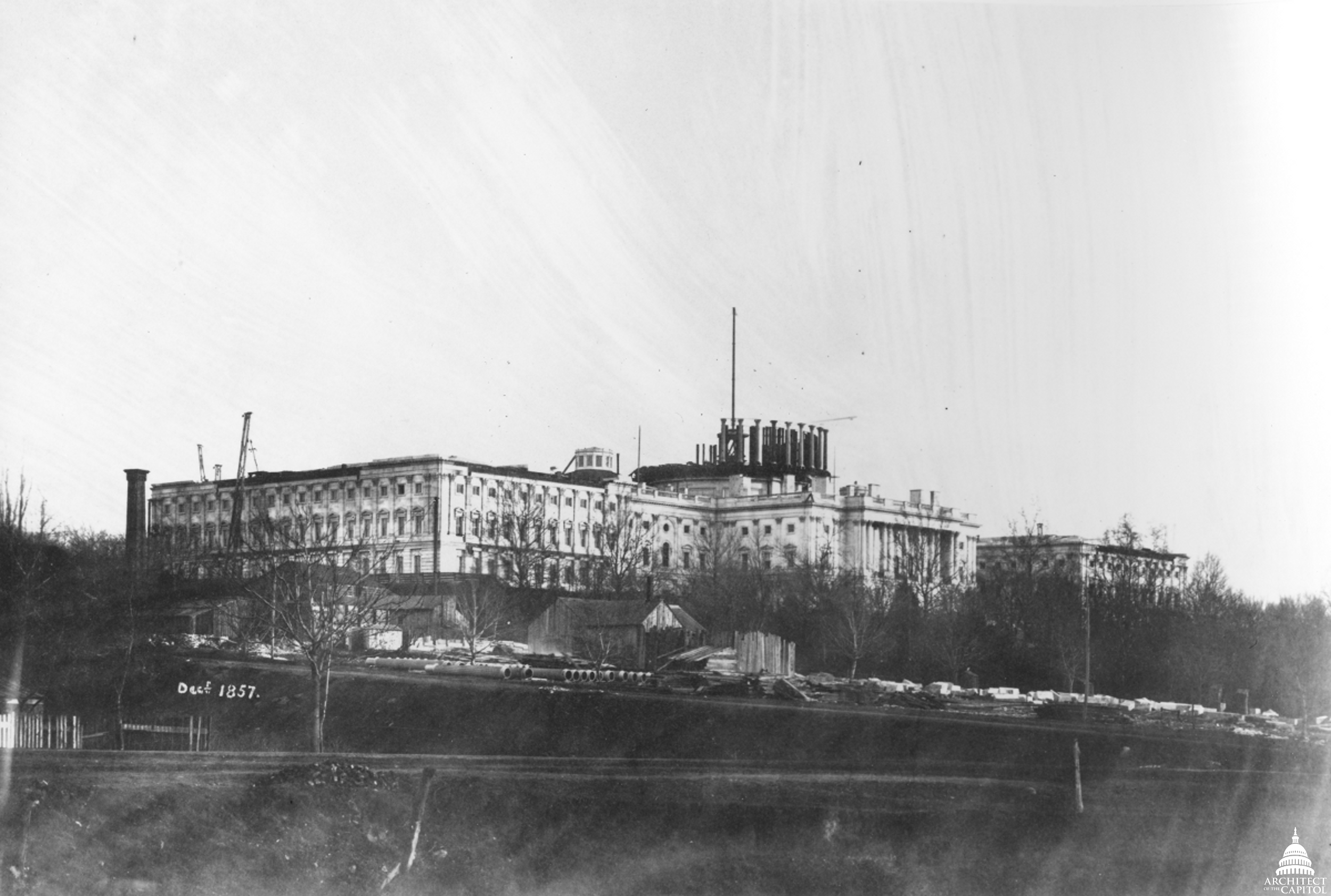
- United States Capitol (1857)

Overview
- Legislative body: United States Congress
- Jurisdiction: United States
- Term: March 4, 1855 – March 4, 1857

Senate
- Members: 62
- President: Vacant
- President pro tempore: Jesse D. Bright (D); Charles E. Stuart (D); James M. Mason (D)
- Party control: Democrat

House of Representatives
- Members: 234 representatives 7 non-voting delegates
- Speaker: Nathaniel P. Banks (A)
- Party control: Opposition coalition

Sessions
- 1st: December 3, 1855 – August 18, 1856
- 2nd: August 21, 1856 – August 30, 1856
- 3rd: December 1, 1856 – March 4, 1857

The 34th United States Congress was a meeting of the legislative branch of the United States federal government, consisting of the United States Senate and the United States House of Representatives. It met in Washington, D.C., from March 4, 1855, to March 4, 1857, during the last two years of Franklin Pierce's presidency. The apportionment of seats in the House of Representatives was based on the 1850 United States census. The Whig Party, one of the two major parties of the era, had largely collapsed, although many former Whigs ran as Republicans or as members of the "Opposition Party." The Senate had a Democratic majority, and the House was controlled by a coalition of Representatives led by Nathaniel P. Banks, a member of the American Party.

== Major events ==
- March 30, 1855: Elections were held for the first Kansas Territory legislature. Missourians crossed the border in large numbers to elect a pro-slavery body.
- July 2, 1855: The Kansas territorial legislature convened in Pawnee and began enacting proslavery laws.
- November 21, 1855: Large-scale Bleeding Kansas violence began with events leading to the Wakarusa War between antislavery and proslavery forces.
- December 3, 1855 – February 2, 1856: The election for Speaker of the House requires 133 ballots, the longest and most contentious speaker election in House history.
- January 24, 1856: President Franklin Pierce declared the new Free-State Topeka government in Bleeding Kansas to be in rebellion.
- January 26, 1856: First Battle of Seattle: Marines from the USS Decatur drove off Indian attackers after an all-day battle with settlers.
- February, 1856: Tintic War broke out in Utah.
- February 18, 1856: The American Party (Know-Nothings) nominated their first Presidential candidate, former President Millard Fillmore.
- May 21, 1856: Lawrence, Kansas, captured and burned by pro-slavery forces (the "Sacking of Lawrence").
- May 22, 1856: Representative Preston Brooks of South Carolina attacking Senator Charles Sumner, beating him with a cane in the hall of the Senate, for a speech Sumner had made attacking Southerners who sympathized with the pro-slavery violence in Kansas ("Bleeding Kansas"). Sumner was unable to return to duty for 3 years while he recovered; Brooks became a hero across the South.
- May 24, 1856: Pottawatomie massacre
- June 2, 1856: Battle of Black Jack
- August 30, 1856: Battle of Osawatomie
- November 4, 1856: 1856 United States presidential election: Democrat James Buchanan defeated former President Millard Fillmore, representing a coalition of "Know-Nothings" and Whigs, and John C. Frémont of the fledgling Republican Party.
- November 17, 1856: On the Sonoita River in present-day southern Arizona, the United States Army established Fort Buchanan to help control new land acquired in the Gadsden Purchase.
- January 9, 1857: The 7.9 Mw Fort Tejon earthquake affects Central and Southern California with a maximum Mercalli intensity of IX (Violent).

== Major legislation ==
- August 18, 1856: Guano Islands Act, ch. 164, 11 Stat. 119

== Treaties ==
- January 26, 1855: Point No Point Treaty signed in the Washington Territory. (Ratified March 8, 1859. Proclaimed April 29, 1859)
- July 1, 1855: Quinault Treaty signed, Quinault and Quileute ceded their land to the United States. (Ratified March 8, 1859. Proclaimed April 11, 1859)

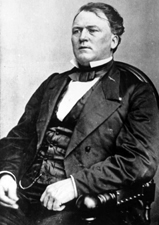
President pro tempore Jesse D. Bright

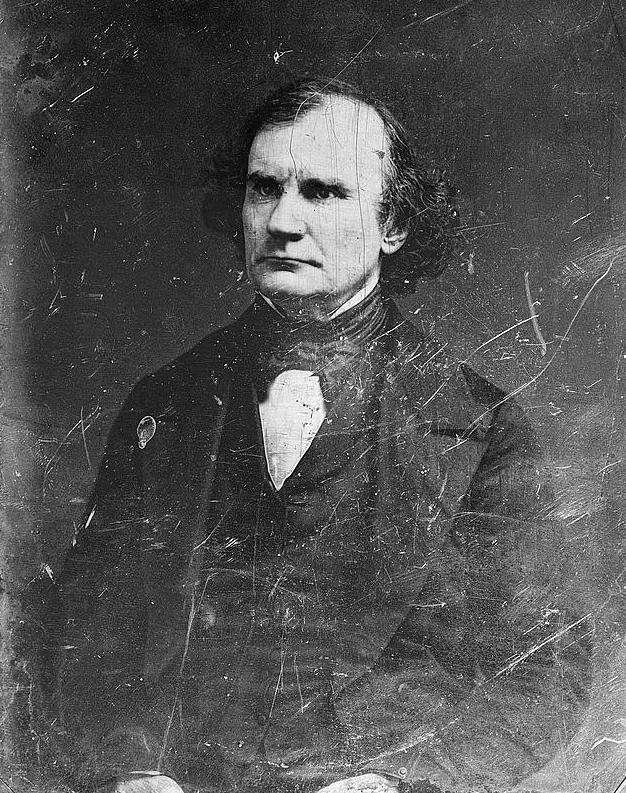
President pro tempore James M. Mason

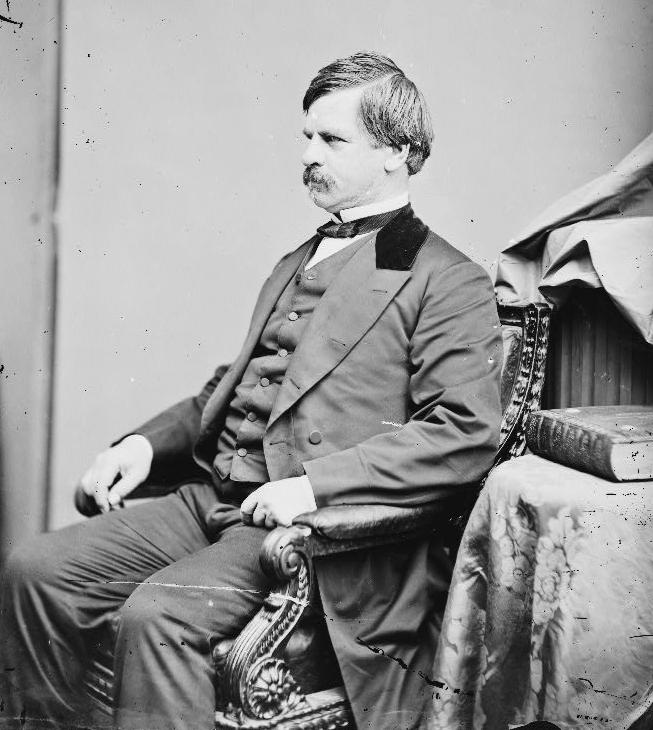
Speaker of the House Nathaniel P. Banks

== Party summary ==
The count below identifies party affiliations at the beginning of this Congress. Changes resulting from subsequent replacements are shown below in the "Changes in membership" section.

During the elections for this Congress, opponents to the Democrats used the Whig party label inconsistently and not at all in some states. Hence in this Congress, and in accordance with the practice of the Senate and House, representatives not associated with the Democratic Party or the American Party are labeled as "Opposition." This is the first example in U.S. history of a form of coalition government in either house of Congress.

=== Senate ===
Affiliation	Party (Shading indicates control)					Total	
Affiliation	American (Know Nothing) (A)	Democratic (D)	Opposition coalition			Total	Vacant
Affiliation	American (Know Nothing) (A)	Democratic (D)	Free Soil (FS)	Republican (R)	Whig (W)	Total	Vacant
End of previous Congress	1	38	5	0	17	61	1
Begin	2	35	2	7	9	55	7
End	2	40	1	11	8	62	0
Final voting share	3.2%	64.5%	32.3%				
Beginning of next Congress	4	37	0	20	0	61	1

=== House of Representatives ===
The parties that opposed the Democrats joined a coalition and formed the majority. The Know Nothings caucused with the Opposition coalition.

Affiliation	Party (Shading indicates control)					Total	
Affiliation	Democratic (D)	Opposition Caucus			Other	Total	Vacant
Affiliation	Democratic (D)	American (Know Nothing) (A)	Opposition (O)	Republican (R)	Other	Total	Vacant
End of previous Congress	156	0	76	0	2	234	0
Begin	82	51	100	0	0	233	1
End	82	51	96	1	0	230	4
Final voting share	35.7%	64.3%			0.0%		
Beginning of next Congress	127	14	0	92	0	233	1

== Leadership ==
=== Senate ===
- President: Vacant
- President pro tempore: Jesse D. Bright (D), until June 9, 1856
  - Charles E. Stuart (D, June 9, 1856 – June 10, 1856
  - Jesse D. Bright (D), June 11, 1856 – January 6, 1857
  - James M. Mason (D), from January 6, 1857

=== House of Representatives ===
- Speaker: Nathaniel P. Banks (A), elected February 2, 1856, on the 133rd ballot
- Democratic Caucus Chairman: George Washington Jones

== Members ==
This list is arranged by chamber, then by state. Senators are listed in order of seniority, and representatives are listed by district.

=== Senate ===
Senators were elected by the state legislatures every two years, with one-third beginning new six-year terms with each Congress. Preceding the names in the list below are Senate class numbers, which indicate the cycle of their election. In this Congress, Class 1 meant their term ended with this Congress, requiring reelection in 1856; Class 2 meant their term began in the last Congress, requiring reelection in 1858; and Class 3 meant their term began in this Congress, requiring reelection in 1860.

Skip to House of Representatives, below

==== Alabama ====
▌2. Clement C. Clay Jr. (D)
▌3. Benjamin Fitzpatrick (D), from November 26, 1855

==== Arkansas ====
▌2. William K. Sebastian (D)
▌3. Robert W. Johnson (D)

==== California ====
▌1. John B. Weller (D)
▌3. William M. Gwin (D), from January 13, 1857

==== Connecticut ====
▌1. Isaac Toucey (D)
▌3. Lafayette S. Foster (R)

==== Delaware ====
▌1. James A. Bayard Jr. (D)
▌2. John M. Clayton (W), until November 9, 1856

▌Joseph P. Comegys (W), November 19, 1856 – January 14, 1857
▌Martin W. Bates (D), from January 14, 1857

==== Florida ====
▌1. Stephen Mallory (D)
▌3. David Levy Yulee (D)

==== Georgia ====
▌2. Robert Toombs (D)
▌3. Alfred Iverson Sr. (D)

==== Illinois ====
▌2. Stephen A. Douglas (D)
▌3. Lyman Trumbull (D)

==== Indiana ====
▌1. Jesse D. Bright (D)
▌3. Graham N. Fitch (D), from February 4, 1857

==== Iowa ====
▌2. George Wallace Jones (D)
▌3. James Harlan (FS), until January 5, 1857

▌James Harlan (R), from January 29, 1857

==== Kentucky ====
▌2. John B. Thompson (A)
▌3. John J. Crittenden (A)

==== Louisiana ====
▌2. Judah P. Benjamin (W)
▌3. John Slidell (D)

==== Maine ====
▌▌1. Hannibal Hamlin (D) to (R) on June 12, 1856, until January 7, 1857

▌Amos Nourse (R), from January 16, 1857

▌2. William P. Fessenden (W)

==== Maryland ====
▌3. James A. Pearce (W)
▌1. Thomas Pratt (W)

==== Massachusetts ====
▌1. Charles Sumner (FS)
▌2. Henry Wilson (R)

==== Michigan ====
▌1. Lewis Cass (D)
▌2. Charles E. Stuart (D)

==== Mississippi ====
▌1. Stephen Adams (D)
▌2. Albert G. Brown (D)

==== Missouri ====
▌1. Henry S. Geyer (W)
▌3. James S. Green (D), from January 12, 1857

==== New Hampshire ====
▌2. John P. Hale (R), from July 30, 1855
▌3. James Bell (R), from July 30, 1855

==== New Jersey ====
▌1. John R. Thomson (D)
▌2. William Wright (D)

==== New York ====
▌3. William H. Seward (R)
▌1. Hamilton Fish (W)

==== North Carolina ====
▌2. David S. Reid (D)
▌3. Asa Biggs (D)

==== Ohio ====
▌1. Benjamin Wade (R)
▌3. George E. Pugh (D)

==== Pennsylvania ====
▌1. Richard Brodhead (D)
▌3. William Bigler (D), from January 14, 1856

==== Rhode Island ====
▌1. Charles T. James (D)
▌2. Philip Allen (D)

==== South Carolina ====
▌3. Andrew Butler (D)
▌2. Josiah J. Evans (D)

==== Tennessee ====
▌2. John Bell (W)
▌1. James C. Jones (W)

==== Texas ====
▌2. Samuel Houston (D)
▌1. Thomas J. Rusk (D)

==== Vermont ====
▌1. Solomon Foot (R)
▌3. Jacob Collamer (R)

==== Virginia ====
▌1. James M. Mason (D)
▌2. Robert M. T. Hunter (D)

==== Wisconsin ====
▌1. Henry Dodge (D)
▌3. Charles Durkee (R)

Senators' party membership by state at the opening of the 34th Congress in March 1855. Pink represents Know-Nothings, green represents Whigs and gray represents Free Soil. The senators from New Hampshire were not seated until July 30, 1855. 2 Democrats 1 Democrat and 1 Republican 2 Republicans 2 Whigs 2 Know-Nothings

=== House of Representatives ===
The names of representatives are preceded by their district numbers.

==== Alabama ====
▌1. Percy Walker (A)
▌2. Eli S. Shorter (D)
▌3. James F. Dowdell (D)
▌4. William R. Smith (A)
▌5. George S. Houston (D)
▌6. Williamson R. W. Cobb (D)
▌7. Sampson W. Harris (D)

==== Arkansas ====
▌1. Alfred B. Greenwood (D)
▌2. Albert Rust (D)

==== California ====
Both representatives were elected statewide on a general ticket.

▌At-large. James W. Denver (D)
▌At-large. Philemon T. Herbert (D)

==== Connecticut ====
▌1. Ezra Clark Jr. (A)
▌2. John Woodruff (A)
▌3. Sidney Dean (A)
▌4. William W. Welch (A)

==== Delaware ====
▌At-large. Elisha D. Cullen (A)

==== Florida ====
▌At-large. Augustus Maxwell (D)

==== Georgia ====
▌1. James L. Seward (D)
▌2. Martin J. Crawford (D)
▌3. Robert P. Trippe (A)
▌4. Hiram B. Warner (D)
▌5. John H. Lumpkin (D)
▌6. Howell Cobb (D)
▌7. Nathaniel G. Foster (A)
▌8. Alexander Stephens (D)

==== Illinois ====
▌1. Elihu B. Washburne (O)
▌2. James H. Woodworth (O)
▌3. Jesse O. Norton (O)
▌4. James Knox (O)
▌5. William A. Richardson (D), until August 25, 1856

▌Jacob C. Davis (D), from November 4, 1856

▌6. Thomas L. Harris (D)
▌7. James C. Allen (D), until July 18, 1856, and from November 4, 1856
▌8. James L. D. Morrison (D), from November 4, 1856
▌9. Samuel S. Marshall (D)

==== Indiana ====
▌1. Smith Miller (D)
▌2. William H. English (D)
▌3. George G. Dunn (O)
▌4. William Cumback (O)
▌5. David P. Holloway (O)
▌6. Lucien Barbour (O)
▌7. Harvey D. Scott (O)
▌8. Daniel Mace (O)
▌9. Schuyler Colfax (O)
▌10. Samuel Brenton (O)
▌11. John U. Pettit (O)

==== Iowa ====
▌1. Augustus Hall (D)
▌2. James Thorington (O)

==== Kentucky ====
▌1. Henry C. Burnett (D)
▌2. John P. Campbell Jr. (A)
▌3. Warner L. Underwood (A)
▌4. Albert G. Talbott (D)
▌5. Joshua Jewett (D)
▌6. John M. Elliott (D)
▌7. Humphrey Marshall (A)
▌8. Alexander K. Marshall (A)
▌9. Leander Cox (A)
▌10. Samuel F. Swope (A)

==== Louisiana ====
▌1. George Eustis Jr. (A)
▌2. Miles Taylor (D)
▌3. Thomas G. Davidson (D)
▌4. John M. Sandidge (D)

==== Maine ====
▌1. John M. Wood (O)
▌2. John J. Perry (O)
▌3. Ebenezer Knowlton (O)
▌4. Samuel P. Benson (O)
▌5. Israel Washburn Jr. (O)
▌6. Thomas J. D. Fuller (D)

==== Maryland ====
▌1. James A. Stewart (D)
▌2. James B. Ricaud (A)
▌3. J. Morrison Harris (A)
▌4. Henry Winter Davis (A)
▌5. Henry William Hoffman (A)
▌6. Thomas F. Bowie (D)

==== Massachusetts ====
▌1. Robert B. Hall (A)
▌2. James Buffington (A)
▌3. William S. Damrell (A)
▌4. Linus B. Comins (A)
▌5. Anson Burlingame (A)
▌6. Timothy Davis (A)
▌7. Nathaniel P. Banks (A)
▌8. Chauncey L. Knapp (A)
▌9. Alexander De Witt (A)
▌10. Calvin C. Chaffee (A)
▌11. Mark Trafton (A)

==== Michigan ====
▌1. William A. Howard (O)
▌2. Henry Waldron (O)
▌3. David S. Walbridge (O)
▌4. George W. Peck (D)

==== Mississippi ====
▌1. Daniel B. Wright (D)
▌2. Hendley S. Bennett (D)
▌3. William Barksdale (D)
▌4. William A. Lake (A)
▌5. John A. Quitman (D)

==== Missouri ====
▌1. Luther M. Kennett (O)
▌2. Gilchrist Porter (O)
▌3. James J. Lindley (O)
▌4. Mordecai Oliver (O)
▌5. John G. Miller (O), until May 11, 1856

▌Thomas P. Akers (A), from August 18, 1856

▌6. John S. Phelps (D)
▌7. Samuel Caruthers (O)

==== New Hampshire ====
▌1. James Pike (A)
▌2. Mason Tappan (A)
▌3. Aaron H. Cragin (A)

==== New Jersey ====
▌1. Isaiah D. Clawson (O)
▌2. George R. Robbins (O)
▌3. James Bishop (O)
▌4. George Vail (D)
▌5. Alexander C. M. Pennington (O)

==== New York ====
▌1. William Valk (A)
▌2. James S. T. Stranahan (O)
▌3. Guy R. Pelton (O)
▌4. John Kelly (D)
▌5. Thomas R. Whitney (A)
▌6. John Wheeler (D)
▌7. Thomas Child Jr. (O)
▌8. Abram Wakeman (O)
▌9. Bayard Clarke (O)
▌10. Ambrose S. Murray (O)
▌11. Rufus H. King (O)
▌12. Killian Miller (O)
▌13. Russell Sage (O)
▌14. Samuel Dickson (O)
▌15. Edward Dodd (O)
▌16. George A. Simmons (O)
▌17. Francis E. Spinner (D)
▌18. Thomas R. Horton (O)
▌19. Jonas A. Hughston (O)
▌20. Orsamus B. Matteson (O), until February 27, 1857
▌21. Henry Bennett (O)
▌22. Andrew Z. McCarty (O)
▌23. William A. Gilbert (O), until February 27, 1857
▌24. Amos P. Granger (O)
▌25. Edwin B. Morgan (O)
▌26. Andrew Oliver (D)
▌27. John M. Parker (O)
▌28. William H. Kelsey (O)
▌29. John Williams (D)
▌30. Benjamin Pringle (O)
▌31. Thomas T. Flagler (O)
▌32. Solomon G. Haven (O)
▌33. Francis S. Edwards (A), until February 28, 1857

==== North Carolina ====
▌1. Robert T. Paine (A)
▌2. Thomas H. Ruffin (D)
▌3. Warren Winslow (D)
▌4. Lawrence O'Bryan Branch (D)
▌5. Edwin G. Reade (A)
▌6. Richard C. Puryear (A)
▌7. F. Burton Craige (D)
▌8. Thomas L. Clingman (D)

==== Ohio ====
▌1. Timothy C. Day (O)
▌2. John Scott Harrison (O)
▌3. Lewis D. Campbell (O)
▌4. Matthias H. Nichols (O)
▌5. Richard Mott (O)
▌6. Jonas R. Emrie (O)
▌7. Aaron Harlan (O)
▌8. Benjamin Stanton (O)
▌9. Cooper K. Watson (O)
▌10. Oscar F. Moore (O)
▌11. Valentine B. Horton (O)
▌12. Samuel Galloway (O)
▌13. John Sherman (O)
▌14. Philemon Bliss (O)
▌15. William R. Sapp (O)
▌16. Edward Ball (O)
▌17. Charles J. Albright (O)
▌18. Benjamin F. Leiter (O)
▌19. Edward Wade (O)
▌20. Joshua R. Giddings (O)
▌21. John Bingham (O)

==== Pennsylvania ====
▌1. Thomas B. Florence (D)
▌2. Job R. Tyson (O)
▌3. William Millward (O)
▌4. Jacob Broom (A)
▌5. John Cadwalader (D)
▌6. John Hickman (D)
▌7. Samuel C. Bradshaw (O)
▌8. J. Glancey Jones (D)
▌9. Anthony E. Roberts (O)
▌10. John C. Kunkel (O)
▌11. James H. Campbell (O)
▌12. Henry M. Fuller (O)
▌13. Asa Packer (D)
▌14. Galusha A. Grow (D)
▌15. John J. Pearce (O)
▌16. Lemuel Todd (O)
▌17. David F. Robison (O)
▌18. John R. Edie (O)
▌19. John Covode (O)
▌20. Jonathan Knight (O)
▌21. David Ritchie (O)
▌22. Samuel A. Purviance (O)
▌23. John Allison (O)
▌24. David Barclay (D)
▌25. John Dick (O)

==== Rhode Island ====
▌1. Nathaniel B. Durfee (A)
▌2. Benjamin B. Thurston (A)

==== South Carolina ====
▌1. John McQueen (D)
▌2. William Aiken Jr. (D)
▌3. Laurence M. Keitt (D), until July 15, 1856, and from August 6, 1856
▌4. Preston Brooks (D), until July 15, 1856, and from August 1, 1856, until January 27, 1857
▌5. James L. Orr (D)
▌6. William W. Boyce (D)

==== Tennessee ====
▌1. Albert G. Watkins (D)
▌2. William H. Sneed (A)
▌3. Samuel A. Smith (D)
▌4. John H. Savage (D)
▌5. Charles Ready (A)
▌6. George W. Jones (D)
▌7. John V. Wright (D)
▌8. Felix K. Zollicoffer (A)
▌9. Emerson Etheridge (A)
▌10. Thomas Rivers (A)

==== Texas ====
▌1. Lemuel D. Evans (A)
▌2. Peter H. Bell (D)

==== Vermont ====
▌1. James Meacham (O), until August 23, 1856

▌George T. Hodges (R), from December 1, 1856

▌2. Justin S. Morrill (O)
▌3. Alvah Sabin (O)

==== Virginia ====
▌1. Thomas H. Bayly (D), until June 23, 1856

▌Muscoe R. H. Garnett (D), from December 1, 1856

▌2. John S. Millson (D)
▌3. John Caskie (D)
▌4. William Goode (D)
▌5. Thomas S. Bocock (D)
▌6. Paulus Powell (D)
▌7. William Smith (D)
▌8. Charles J. Faulkner Sr. (D)
▌9. John Letcher (D)
▌10. Zedekiah Kidwell (D)
▌11. John S. Carlile (A)
▌12. Henry A. Edmundson (D)
▌13. LaFayette McMullen (D)

==== Wisconsin ====
▌1. Daniel Wells Jr. (D)
▌2. Cadwallader C. Washburn (O)
▌3. Charles Billinghurst (O)

==== Non-voting members ====
▌Kansas Territory. John W. Whitfield (D), until August 1, 1856, and from December 9, 1856
▌Minnesota Territory. Henry M. Rice (D)
▌Nebraska Territory. Bird B. Chapman (D)
▌New Mexico Territory. José Manuel Gallegos (D), until July 23, 1856

▌Miguel A. Otero (D), from July 23, 1856

▌Oregon Territory. Joseph Lane (D)
Utah Territory. John M. Bernhisel
▌Washington Territory. James P. Anderson (D)

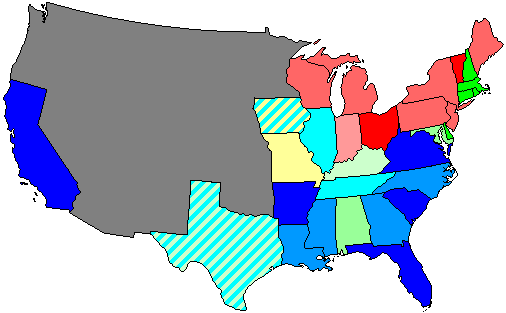
House seats by party holding plurality in state: Up to 60% Democratic / Up to 60% Whig / Up to 60% American / Up to 60% Republican; 60+% to 80% Democratic / 60+% to 80% Whig / 60+% to 80% American / 60+% to 80% Republican; 80+% to 100% Democratic / / 80+% to 100% American / 80+% to 100% Republican

== Changes in membership ==
The count below reflects changes from the beginning of the first session of this Congress.

=== Senate ===
Senate changes
State (class)	Vacated by	Reason for change	Successor	Date of successor's formal installation (Note: When seated or oath administered, not necessarily when service began.)
New Hampshire (2)	Vacant	Charles G. Atherton (D) died during the previous Congress. Jared W. Williams (D) was appointed November 29, 1853, to continue the term, but his term was deemed expired July 15, 1854, and the legislature failed to elect a successor. A successor was finally elected July 30, 1855.	John Parker Hale (R)	July 30, 1855
New Hampshire (3)	Vacant	Legislature failed to elect on time. Successor was elected.	James Bell (R)	July 30, 1855
Alabama (3)	Vacant	Legislature failed to elect on time. Incumbent was then re-elected November 26, 1855.	Benjamin Fitzpatrick (D)	November 26, 1855
Pennsylvania (3)	Vacant	Legislature failed to elect on time. Successor elected January 14, 1856.	William Bigler (D)	January 14, 1856
Missouri (3)	Vacant	Elected but took seat late on January 12, 1857.	James S. Green (D)	January 12, 1857
California (3)	Vacant	Legislature failed to elect on time. Incumbent was then re-elected January 13, 1857.	William M. Gwin (D)	January 13, 1857
Indiana (3)	Vacant	Legislature failed to elect on time. Senator elected February 4, 1857.	Graham N. Fitch (D)	February 4, 1857
Delaware (2)	John M. Clayton (W)	Died November 9, 1856. Successor was appointed.	Joseph P. Comegys (W)	November 19, 1856
Maine (1)	Hannibal Hamlin (D)	Resigned January 7, 1857, to become Governor of Maine. Successor was elected January 16, 1857.	Amos Nourse (R)	January 16, 1857
Delaware (2)	Joseph P. Comegys (W)	Appointment expired January 14, 1857, upon successor's election.	Martin W. Bates (D)	January 14, 1857
Iowa (3)	James Harlan (FS)	Owing to irregularities in the legislative proceedings the Senate declared the seat vacant January 5, 1857. Incumbent was subsequently re-elected January 29, 1857, to fill the vacancy caused by his ouster.	James Harlan (R)	January 29, 1857

=== House of Representatives ===
- Replacements: 6
  - Democrats: 2 seat net loss
  - Opposition: 4 seat net gain
- Deaths: 4
- Resignations: 5
- Contested election: 1
- Total seats with changes: 10

House changes
District	Vacated by	Reason for change	Successor	Date of successor's formal installation
Illinois 8th	Vacant	Rep-elect Lyman Trumbull resigned in previous congress after being elected to the US Senate	James L. D. Morrison (D)	Seated November 4, 1856
Missouri 5th	John G. Miller (O)	Died May 11, 1856	Thomas P. Akers (A)	Seated August 18, 1856
Virginia 1st	Thomas H. Bayly (D)	Died June 23, 1856	Muscoe R. H. Garnett (D)	Seated December 1, 1856
South Carolina 3rd	Laurence M. Keitt (D)	Resigned July 15, 1856, after being censured in his role in the assault on US Senator Charles Sumner. He was subsequently re-elected to fill the vacancy	Laurence M. Keitt (D)	Seated August 6, 1856
South Carolina 4th	Preston Brooks (D)	Resigned July 15, 1856, after assaulting US Senator Charles Sumner. He was subsequently re-elected to fill the vacancy	Preston Brooks (D)	Seated August 1, 1856
Illinois 7th	James C. Allen (D)	House declared on July 18, 1856, he was not entitled to seat. He was subsequently re-elected to fill the vacancy	James C. Allen (D)	Seated November 4, 1856
New Mexico Territory At-large	José M. Gallegos (D)	Contested election July 23, 1856	Miguel A. Otero (D)	Seated July 23, 1856
Kansas Territory At-large	John W. Whitfield (D)	House declared August 1, 1856, the seat vacant. He was subsequently re-elected to fill the vacancy	John W. Whitfield (D)	Seated December 9, 1856
Vermont 1st	James Meacham (O)	Died August 23, 1856	George T. Hodges (R)	Seated December 1, 1856
Illinois 5th	William A. Richardson (D)	Resigned August 25, 1856	Jacob C. Davis (D)	Seated November 4, 1856
South Carolina 4th	Preston Brooks (D)	Died January 27, 1857	Vacant	Not filled this term
New York 20th	Orsamus B. Matteson (O)	Resigned February 27, 1857	Vacant	Not filled this term
New York 23rd	William A. Gilbert (O)	Resigned February 27, 1857	Vacant	Not filled this term
New York 33rd	Francis S. Edwards (A)	Resigned February 28, 1857	Vacant	Not filled this term

== Committees ==
List of committees and their party leaders.

=== Senate ===
- Agriculture (Chairman: Philip Allen)
- American Association for the Promotion of Science (Select)
- Atmospheric Telegraph Between Washington and Baltimore (Select)
- Audit and Control the Contingent Expenses of the Senate (Chairman: Josiah J. Evans)
- Claims (Chairman: Richard Brodhead)
- Commerce (Chairman: Hannibal Hamlin then Henry Dodge)
- Distributing Public Revenue Among the States (Select)
- District of Columbia (Chairman: Albert G. Brown)
- Engrossed Bills (Chairman: Jacob Collamer)
- Finance (Chairman: Robert M. T. Hunter)
- Foreign Relations (Chairman: James M. Mason)
- French Spoilations (Select)
- Indian Affairs (Chairman: William K. Sebastian)
- Judiciary (Chairman: Andrew P. Butler)
- Library (Chairman: James A. Pearce)
- Loss of Original Papers of Mark and Richard Bean (Select)
- Mexican Claims Commission (Select)
- Manufactures (Chairman: William Wright)
- Military Affairs (Chairman: John B. Weller)
- Militia (Chairman: Sam Houston)
- Naval Affairs (Chairman: Stephen Mallory)
- Ordnance and War Ships (Select)
- Pacific Railroad (Select)
- Patents and the Patent Office (Chairman: Charles T. James)
- Pensions (Chairman: George Wallace Jones)
- Post Office and Post Roads (Chairman: Thomas J. Rusk)
- Printing (Chairman: Robert W. Johnson)
- Private Claims Commission (Select)
- Private Land Claims (Chairman: Judah P. Benjamin)
- Protection of Life and Health in Passenger Ships (Select)
- Public Buildings (Chairman: James A. Bayard)
- Public Lands (Chairman: Charles E. Stuart)
- Retrenchment (Chairman: Stephen Adams)
- Revolutionary Claims (Chairman: Josiah J. Evans)
- Roads and Canals (Chairman: John Slidell)
- Sickness on Emigrant Ships (Select)
- Tariff Regulation (Select)
- Territories (Chairman: Stephen A. Douglas)
- Whole

=== House of Representatives ===
- Accounts (Chairman: Benjamin B. Thurston)
- Agriculture (Chairman: David P. Holloway)
- Claims (Chairman: John Hickman)
- Commerce (Chairman: Elihu B. Washburne)
- District of Columbia (Chairman: Orsamus B. Matteson)
- Elections (Chairman: Israel Washburn Jr.)
- Engraving (Chairman: William H. Kelsey)
- Expenditures in the Navy Department (Chairman: Thomas L. Harris)
- Expenditures in the Post Office Department (Chairman: John Pettit)
- Expenditures in the State Department (Chairman: Preston S. Brooks)
- Expenditures in the Treasury Department (Chairman: Henry Waldron)
- Expenditures in the War Department (Chairman: Joshua H. Jewett)
- Expenditures on Public Buildings (Chairman: Fayette McMullen)
- Foreign Affairs (Chairman: Alexander C. M. Pennington)
- Indian Affairs (Chairman: Benjamin Pringle)
- Invalid Pensions (Chairman: Andrew Oliver)
- Judiciary (Chairman: George A. Simmons)
- Manufactures (Chairman: Ezra Clark Jr.)
- Mileage (Chairman: William H. Sneed)
- Military Affairs (Chairman: John A. Quitman)
- Militia (Chairman: John C. Kunkel)
- Naval Affairs (Chairman: Samuel P. Benson)
- Patents (Chairman: Edwin B. Morgan)
- Post Office and Post Roads (Chairman: Daniel Mace)
- Private Land Claims (Chairman: Gilchrist Porter)
- Public Buildings and Grounds (Chairman: Edward Ball)
- Public Expenditures (Chairman: Sidney Dean)
- Public Lands (Chairman: Henry Bennett)
- Revisal and Unfinished Business (Chairman: Alvah Sabin)
- Revolutionary Claims (Chairman: David Ritchie)
- Revolutionary Pensions (Chairman: Jacob Broom)
- Roads and Canals (Chairman: James Knox)
- Rules (Select)
- Standards of Official Conduct
- Territories (Chairman: Galusha A. Grow)
- Ways and Means (Chairman: Lewis D. Campbell)
- Whole

=== Joint committees ===
- Amending the Constitution on Presidential and Vice Presidential Elections
- Enrolled Bills (Chairman: Rep. James Pike)
- The Library (Chairman: Rep. William Aiken)
- Printing (Chairman: Rep. Matthias H. Nichols)
- San Francisco Disaster

== Caucuses ==
- Democratic (House)
- Democratic (Senate)

== Employees ==
=== Legislative branch agency directors ===
- Architect of the Capitol: Thomas U. Walter
- Librarian of Congress: John Silva Meehan

=== Senate ===
- Chaplain: Henry Slicer (Methodist), until December 4, 1855
  - Henry C. Dean (Methodist), until December 8, 1856
  - Stephen P. Hill (Baptist), elected December 8, 1856
- Secretary: Asbury Dickins
- Sergeant at Arms: Dunning R. McNair

=== House of Representatives ===
- Chaplain: Daniel Waldo, elected February 21, 1856
- Clerk: John W. Forney, until February 4, 1856
  - William Cullom, elected February 4, 1856
- Doorkeeper: Nathan Darling
- Messenger: Thaddeus Morrice
- Postmaster: Robert Morris
- Sergeant at Arms: Adam J. Glossbrenner

== See also ==
- 1854 United States elections (elections leading to this Congress)
  - 1854–55 United States Senate elections
  - 1854–55 United States House of Representatives elections
- 1856 United States elections (elections during this Congress, leading to the next Congress)
  - 1856 United States presidential election
  - 1856–57 United States Senate elections
  - 1856–57 United States House of Representatives elections
