= Opposition Party (Northern U.S.) =

U.S. Northern anti-slavery movement of the mid-1850s

The Opposition Party was a party identification under which Northern anti-slavery politicians, formerly members of the Democratic and the Whig Parties, briefly ran in the 1850s in response to the expansion of slavery into the new territories. It was one of the movements that arose from the political chaos in the decade before the American Civil War in the wake of the Compromise of 1850. The movement had arisen before and was quickly subsumed by the coalescence of the Republican Party in 1856.

During the fragmenting of the Second Party System of Jackson Democrats and Clay Whigs, the Democratic efforts to expand slavery into western territories, particularly Kansas, led to organized political opposition, which coalesced in Congress as the "Opposition Party." As the Whig Party disintegrated, many local and regional parties grew up, some ideological and some geographic. When they realized their numbers in Congress, they began to caucus in the same way that US political parties had arisen before the Jacksonian national party conventions. Scholars such as Kenneth C. Martis have adopted a convention to explain the congressional coordination of anti-Pierce and anti-Buchanan factions as the "Opposition Party."

== 1854 ==
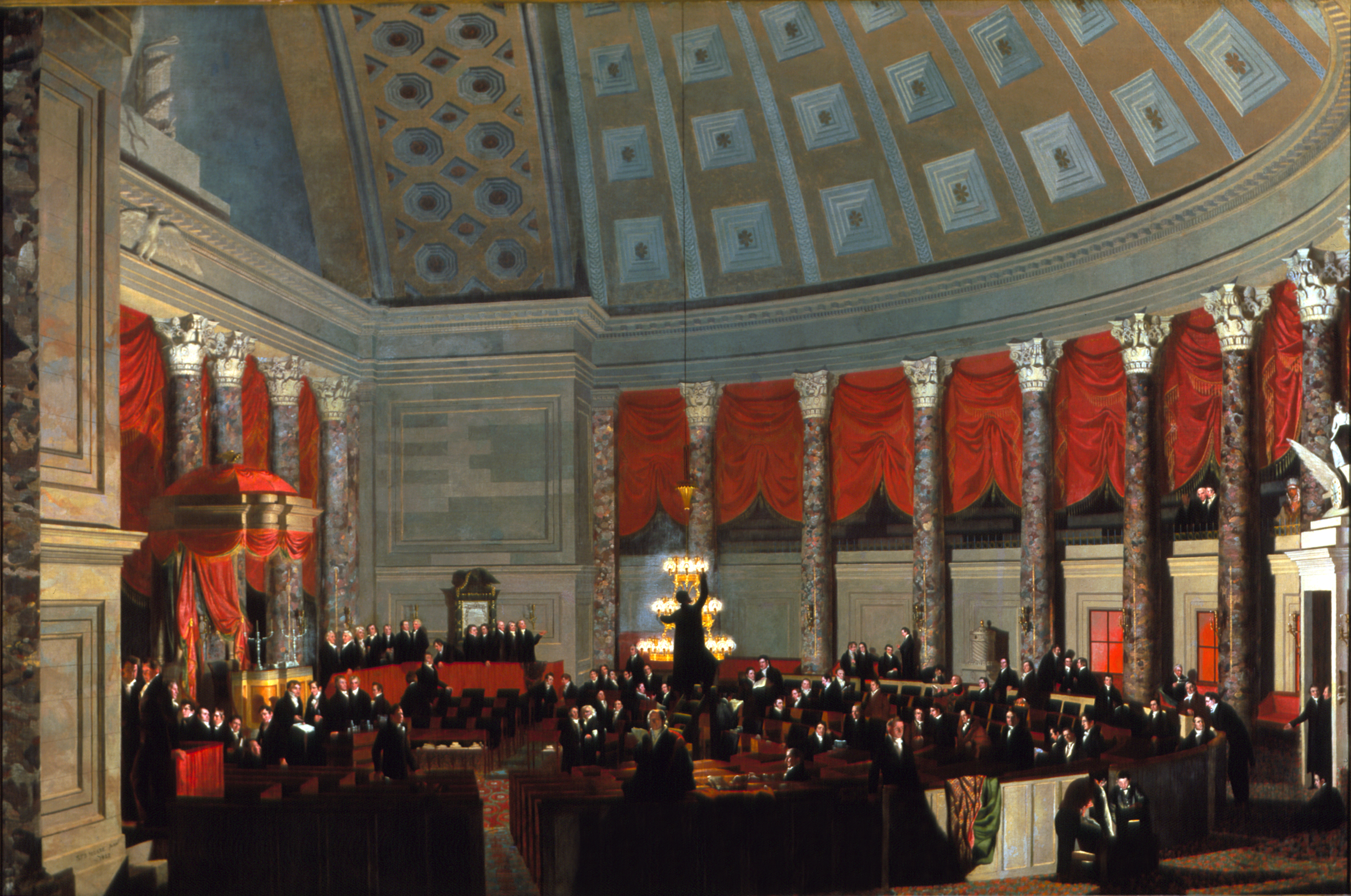
U.S. House of Representatives chamber before 1858, when it moved to the New House Chamber currently in use, shown in the 1823 Samuel F.B. Morse's painting House of Representatives.

In the Congressional election of 1854 for the 34th United States Congress, the new Republican Party was not fully formed, and significant numbers of politicians, mostly former Whigs, ran for office under the Opposition label. The administration of Democratic President Franklin Pierce had been marred by Bleeding Kansas. Northerners began to coalesce around resistance to Kansas entering the Union as a slave state. The ongoing violence made any election results from that territory suspect by standards of democracy.

The Opposition Party was the name adopted by several former Whig politicians in the period 1854–1858. In 1860, the party was encouraged by the remaining Whig leadership to effectively merge with the Constitutional Union Party.

It represented a brief but significant transitional period in American politics from approximately 1854 to 1858. Since independence, a major political issue had been conflict, whether open or structural, between the pro-slavery and anti-slavery factions in the United States, fought more on the basis of regional and class affiliations than strictly along party lines. Passage of the Kansas–Nebraska Act in 1854 both did major short-term political damage to Northern Democrats and fractured the Whig Party on the slavery issue, driving the formation of the anti-slavery Republican Party. During that transitional period, the Opposition Party served as a successor to, or a continuation of, the imploding Whig Party.

The party was seen as offering a compromise position between the Southern Democrats and Northern Republicans.

The Whig name had been critically weakened, but former Whigs still needed to advertise that they were opposed to the Democrats. The Know Nothings had found that their appeals to anti-immigrant prejudice were faltering and their secrecy was made suspect, so they sought more open and more inclusive appeals to broaden a candidate's chances at the polls.

The "confounding party labels among all those who opposed the Democrats" have led to scholars of U.S. political parties in Congress to adopt the convention "Opposition Party" for the 34th and 35th Congresses. This term encompasses Independent, Know Nothing, Fusion, Anti-Nebraska, Anti-Administration, Whig, Free Soil and Unionist.

Following the 1854 election, the Opposition Party actually was the largest party in the U.S. House of Representatives. In the resulting 34th United States Congress, the U.S. House's 234 Representatives were made up of 100 Oppositionists, 83 Democrats, and 51 Americans (Know Nothing). That was a very dramatic shift from the makeup of the 33rd United States Congress (157 Democrats, 71 Whigs, 4 Free Soilers, 1 Independent, 1 Independent Democrat). As a provisional coalition more united by what it opposed and not yet fully having agreed on what it stood for, being the largest party did not lead to control of Congress. The new Speaker of the House, elected by plurality, was Nathaniel P. Banks of Massachusetts, a former Democrat who campaigned as a Know Nothing in 1854 and as a Republican in 1856.

By the 1856 elections, the Republican Party had formally organized, while the Democrats enjoyed a fleeting political recovery from damage done by the Kansas–Nebraska Act. The 35th United States Congress comprised 132 Democrats, 90 Republicans, 14 Americans, 1 Independent Democrat.

== See also ==
- Anti-Nebraska movement
- Bleeding Kansas
- Dred Scott v. Sandford
- Fugitive Slave Act of 1850
- History of the United States Democratic Party
- History of the United States Republican Party
- Know Nothing
- Timeline of events leading to the American Civil War
- Uncle Tom's Cabin
- Whig Party (United States)
