= Muhlenberg (surname) =

Muhlenberg is a surname. Notable people with the surname include:

- Bill Muehlenberg (born 1953), Australian blogger
- Edward D. Muhlenberg (1831–1883), American civil engineer and Civil War officer
- Francis Swaine Muhlenberg (1795–1831, American political leader
- Franz Mühlenberg (1894–1976), German politician
- Frederick Muhlenberg (1750–1801), first Speaker of the United States House of Representatives
- Frederick Augustus Muhlenberg (1887–1980), founder of Muhlenberg Greene Architects and an American military and political leader
- Frederick Augustus Muhlenberg (educator) (1818–1901), president of Muhlenberg College
- Gotthilf Heinrich Ernst Muhlenberg (1753–1815), American clergyman and botanist
- Henry Muhlenberg (1711–1787), German Lutheran clergyman and patriarch of the Muhlenberg family
- Henry A. P. Muhlenberg (1782–1844), early American political leader and diplomat
- Henry Augustus Muhlenberg (1823–1854), American politician
- Henry Augustus Muhlenberg (1848–1906) of Reading, Pennsylvania
- Henry Muhlenberg (mayor), of Lancaster, Pennsylvania
- Peter Muhlenberg (1746–1807), clergyman and major general of the Continental Army
- William Augustus Muhlenberg (1796–1877), American philanthropist and Protestant Episcopal clergyman
