= Henry Muhlenberg (disambiguation) =

Henry Muhlenberg (1711–1787) was a founder of the Lutheran Church in the United States.

Henry Muhlenberg is also the name of:

- Gotthilf Heinrich Ernst Muhlenberg (1753–1815), American botanist, Lutheran pastor, and the first president of Franklin College
- Henry A. P. Muhlenberg (1782–1844), Lutheran minister and Pennsylvania Congressman
- Henry Augustus Muhlenberg (1823–1854), attorney and Pennsylvania Congressman, son of Henry A. P. Muhlenberg
- Henry Augustus Muhlenberg (1848–1906), lawyer and politician in Reading, Pennsylvania
- Henry Melchior Muhlenberg Richards (1848-1935), American military officer
- Henry Muhlenberg (mayor), American politician
