= Muhlenberg family =

American family

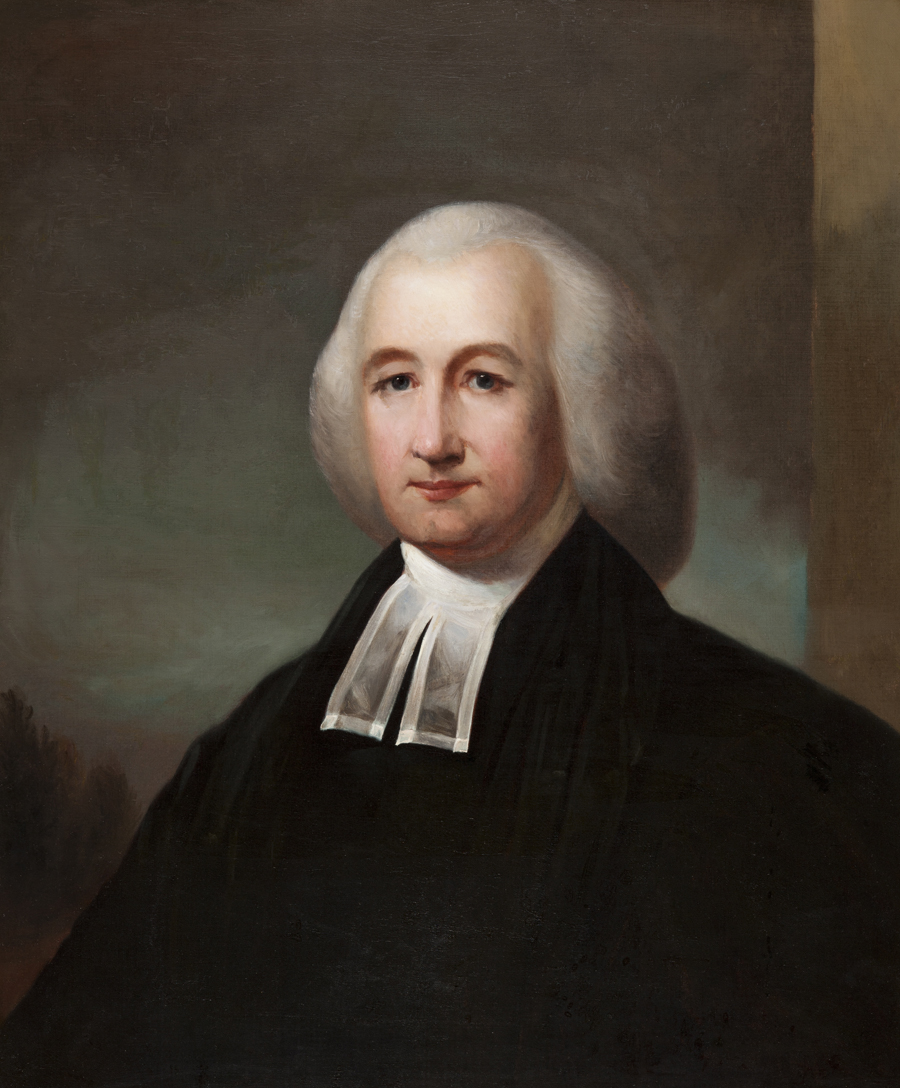
A portrait of Henry Muhlenberg, c. 1770

The Muhlenberg family created a United States political, religious, and military dynasty that was primarily based in the Commonwealth of Pennsylvania, but which had also expanded into the State of Ohio by the early nineteenth century.

The German American family descends from Henry Muhlenberg (1711–1787), a German immigrant, influential Lutheran minister, and founder of the first Lutheran synod in America.

Noted members of the Muhlenberg family include:

- Peter Muhlenberg (1746–1807) minister, Continental Army general, U.S. Congressman, U.S. Senator
- Frederick Augustus Muhlenberg was the name of several members of the family:
  - Frederick Augustus Muhlenberg (1750–1801), member of the Continental Congress, first Speaker of the U.S. House of Representatives
  - Frederick Augustus Muhlenberg (educator) (1818–1901), president of Muhlenberg College in Allentown, Pennsylvania
  - Frederick Augustus Muhlenberg (1887–1980) architect, founder of Muhlenberg Greene Architects, U.S. Congressman, and World War I and World War II soldier
- Gotthilf Henry Ernest Muhlenberg (1753–1815), botanist
- Maria Salome Muhlenberg (1766–1827), youngest daughter of Henry Melchior Muhlenberg and wife of U..S Congressman Matthias Richards (1758-1830); interred at the Charles Evans Cemetery in Reading, Pennsylvania
- Henry A. P. Muhlenberg (1782–1844), U.S. Congressman and U.S. minister to Austria
- Francis Swaine Muhlenberg (1795–1831), U.S. Congressman
- William Augustus Mühlenberg (1796–1877), Episcopal priest, school founder, and philanthropist
- Henry Augustus Muhlenberg (1823–1854), U.S. Congressman
- Frederick Hunter Muhlenberg II (1865–1933), architect
- Charles Henry Muhlenberg IV (1870–1960), architect
- Charles Henry Muhlenberg V (1899–1985), architect and member of the Reading, Pennsylvania Planning Commission

The Muhlenbergs were related to the Hiester family.

== Other descendants ==
- Matthias Richards (1758–1830), U.S. Congressman
  - Henry Melchior Muhlenberg Richards (1848–1935), American military officer
- John Andrew Shulze (1775–1852), Pennsylvania governor

== Family tree ==
Johann Conrad Weiser, Sr. (1668–1746)
Conrad Weiser (1696–1760)	Nicolaus Melchoir Muhlenberg	Anna Maria Kleinschmid
Anna Maria Weiser	Henry Melchior Muhlenberg (1711–1787)
John Peter Gabriel Muhlenberg (1746–1807)	Frederick Augustus Conrad Muhlenberg (1750–1801)	Gotthilf Henry Ernest Muhlenberg (1753–1815)	Mary Catherine Hall	Eve Elizabeth Muhlenberg	Christopher Emmanuel Shulze	Maria Salome Muhlenberg	Matthias Richards
Isaac Hiester	Hester Muhlenberg	Francis Swaine Muhlenberg (1795–1831)	Henry William Muhlenberg (1772–1805)	Henry A. P. Muhlenberg (1782–1844)	Frederick Augustus Hall Muhlenberg (1795–1867)	Elizabeth Schaum	John Andrew Shulze (1774–1852)
William Muhlenberg Hiester (1818–1878)	George Frederick Baer (1842–1914)	William Augustus Muhlenberg (1796–1877)	Henry Augustus Muhlenberg (1823–1854)	Frederick Augustus Muhlenberg (1818–1901)	Catherine Anne Muhlenberg (granddaughter of Peter)
Isaac Hiester (1856–1921)	Mary Kimmell Baer (1872–1946)	Henry Augustus Mulhenberg III (1848–1906)	Henrietta A. Muhlenberg (granddaughter of Henry A.P.)	William Frederick Muhlenburg (1852–1915)
George Baer Hiester (1909–1962)	Frederick Augustus Muhlenberg II (1887–1980)
