= Muhlenberg Greene Architects =

Muhlenberg Greene Architects, Ltd.
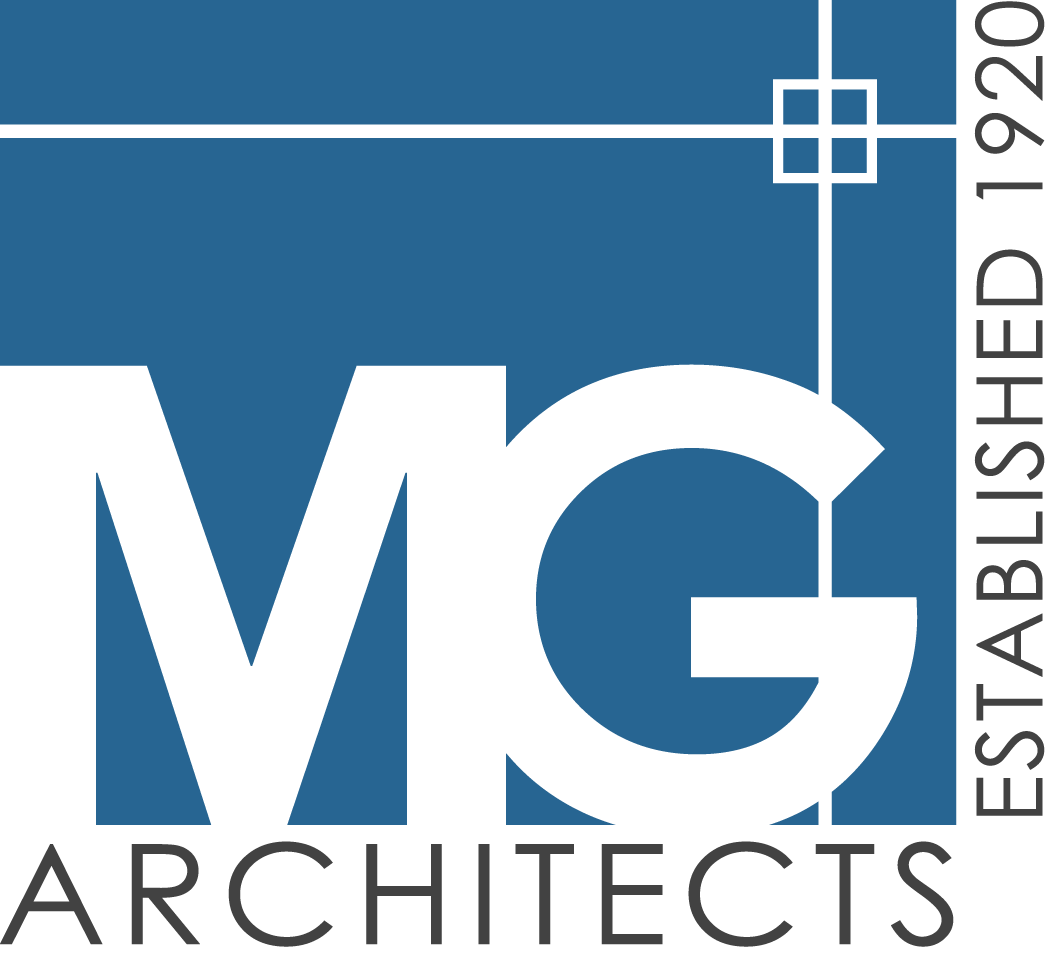
- Company type: Private company
- Industry: Architecture
- Founded: 1920
- Founder: Frederick A. Muhlenberg
- Number of employees: 13
- Website: mg-architects.com

Muhlenberg Greene Architects, Ltd. is a full-service architecture firm, in continuous operation since 1920, and was one of the predominant architecture/engineering firms in Reading, Pennsylvania, during the first half of the 20th century.

Muhlenberg Greene Architects was originally established in 1920 as Frederick A. Muhlenberg, Registered Architect. Since its founding, Muhlenberg Greene Architects lists over 3,500 commissions to its credit, including many landmarks in the city of Reading, such as Berks Heim, the Reading Medical Arts Building, and Stokesay Castle.

== Founder ==
The original founder of Muhlenberg Greene Architects, Frederick Augustus Muhlenberg II, FAIA was renowned for his endeavors in architecture, politics, community, social services, and the military. Although Frederick Muhlenberg opened an office in Philadelphia around 1917–1919, by 1920, the practice was located exclusively in Reading, and the firm continued through several reorganizations to its present form as Muhlenberg Greene Architects, Ltd.

Frederick A. Muhlenberg, Registered Architect, 1920–1930

Muhlenberg, Yerkes, Muhlenberg, 1930 – 1957

(Partners were Frederick A. Muhlenberg, Simeon M. Yerkes, Charles Rick Muhlenberg (died 7/15/1953), and Frederick H. Muhlenberg.

Muhlenberg and Yerkes Associates, 1957 – 1959

Frederick A. Muhlenberg & Associates, 1959 – 1965

Muhlenberg-Greene-Veres, 1965 – 1972

(Partners were Frederick A. Muhlenberg, Lawrence A. Greene, Jr. and Elmer Veres)

Muhlenberg-Greene Architects, 1972 – 1977

(Partners were Frederick A. Muhlenberg and Lawrence A. Greene, Jr.)

Muhlenberg-Greene Architects, 1977–1980

(Lawrence A. Greene, Jr., Sole Proprietor)

Muhlenberg Greene Architects, Ltd., 1980 – Present

Frequently confused with the Muhlenberg Brothers, an architecture/engineering firm also operating in Reading, Pennsylvania during the first half of the 20th century, Muhlenberg Greene Architects was never affiliated with Muhlenberg Brothers’ firm, although Frederick Muhlenberg does have familial ties with the Brothers.

Officially retiring from the firm in 1977, one week after his 90th birthday, Mr. Muhlenberg still came to the office daily until physical limitations prevented him from doing so about a year later. Fred Muhlenberg died on January 19, 1980, at 92 years of age.

== Present organization ==
Following Mr. Muhlenberg's retirement in 1977, the Firm became the sole proprietorship of Lawrence A. Greene Jr, (who had, at that time, been a partner of the firm for 25 years) until January 1, 1980, when the present corporation, Muhlenberg Greene Architects, Ltd., was established. The original principals/stockholders were Lawrence (Larry) A. Greene, Howard Quaintance, and James (Jim) E. Dockey. In 1983, Dennis W. Rex was added as a principal/stockholder of the Firm. In 1998, John R. Hill became a principal/stockholder. The current principals are Larry Greene, Howard Quaintance, Dennis W. Rex, and John R. Hill. Muhlenberg Greene Architects, Ltd. is a member of the American Institute of Architects and the U.S. Green Building Council, and many of the staff are LEED Accredited Professionals.

== Selected projects ==
- Pennsylvania Optical Company, 1916
- Chantrell Tool, 1922
- Alterations to Pomeroy's Department Store, Reading, Pennsylvania, 1922–1968
- The Harold Furniture Company, 726 Penn Street, Reading, Pennsylvania, 1923
- Industrial extensions to Carpenter Steel Company, 1923-1950
- Penn Hardware, 1924, 1942
- Twelfth street surgical wing of St. Joseph's Hospital, Reading, Pennsylvania, South wing 1926
- Croll and Keck, Reading, Pennsylvania, 1927
- Annex to the Wyomissing Club, 1929
- Reed Street addition to YMCA, Reading, Pennsylvania. Multiple projects for YMCA of Reading, 1929–2000
- Medical Arts Building, 230 North Fifth Street, Reading, Pennsylvania, 2 Jan 1931
- Stokesay Castle, Reading, Pennsylvania, built 1932, renovated 2009
- Additions to Whitner's, Reading, Pennsylvania, 1941, 1953
- Berks Heim, Bern Township, Pennsylvania, 1954, Annex 1974
- New Science Building, Kutztown State Teachers College, Kutztown, Pennsylvania, 1959
- Episcopal House Apartments, 9th and Washington Streets, Reading, Pennsylvania, 1972
- Penn Square Center, Reading, Pennsylvania, 1978
- Madison Building, Fourth and Washington Streets, Reading, Pennsylvania, 1984
- Reading City Hall addition and renovation, Reading, Pennsylvania, 1994
- Reading Eagle Press Hall Addition, Reading, Pennsylvania, 2009
- Read's Department Store, Reading, Pennsylvania
- Two Reading Public Library branches, Reading, Pennsylvania
- American Bank buildings, Reading, Pennsylvania
- Four Reading School District Buildings, Reading, Pennsylvania
- Community General Hospital, Reading, Pennsylvania
- Western Electric main plant, Reading, Pennsylvania
- Addition to Bell Telephone Company, Lancaster, Pennsylvania
- General Battery Corp., Reading, Pennsylvania
- CNA Insurance, Reading, Pennsylvania
- Reading-Muhlenberg Vo-Tech, Muhlenberg Township, Pennsylvania
- Carole & Ray Neag Center, Children's Home of Reading, Reading, Pennsylvania, 2003
- C.E. Cole Intermediate School, Muhlenberg School District, Laureldale, Pennsylvania, 2008
- Utilities Employees Credit Union, Wyomissing, Pennsylvania, 2010

== Other clients ==
- American Chain & Cable Co.
- The Glidden Company
- Polymer Corporation
- Ready, Pratt and Cady

== See also ==
- Frederick A. Muhlenberg
- Muhlenberg family
- Muhlenberg
- Reading, Pennsylvania
- Berks County, Pennsylvania
- George Baer Hiester
- Medical Arts Building (Reading, Pennsylvania)
