= Muhlenberg =

Muhlenberg may refer to:

== People ==
- Muhlenberg (surname)
- The Muhlenberg family, American political, religious, and military dynasty

== Places ==
- Muhlenberg County, Kentucky
- Muhlenberg College, in Allentown, Pennsylvania
- Muhlenberg School District, in Berks County, Pennsylvania
- Muhlenberg Township, Pennsylvania, in Berks County
- Lake Muhlenberg, in Allentown, Pennsylvania

== See also ==
- Mühleberg, a municipality in Bern canton, Switzerland
- Muhlenberg legend
