= Woodward Hill Cemetery =

Cemetery in Lancaster, Pennsylvania

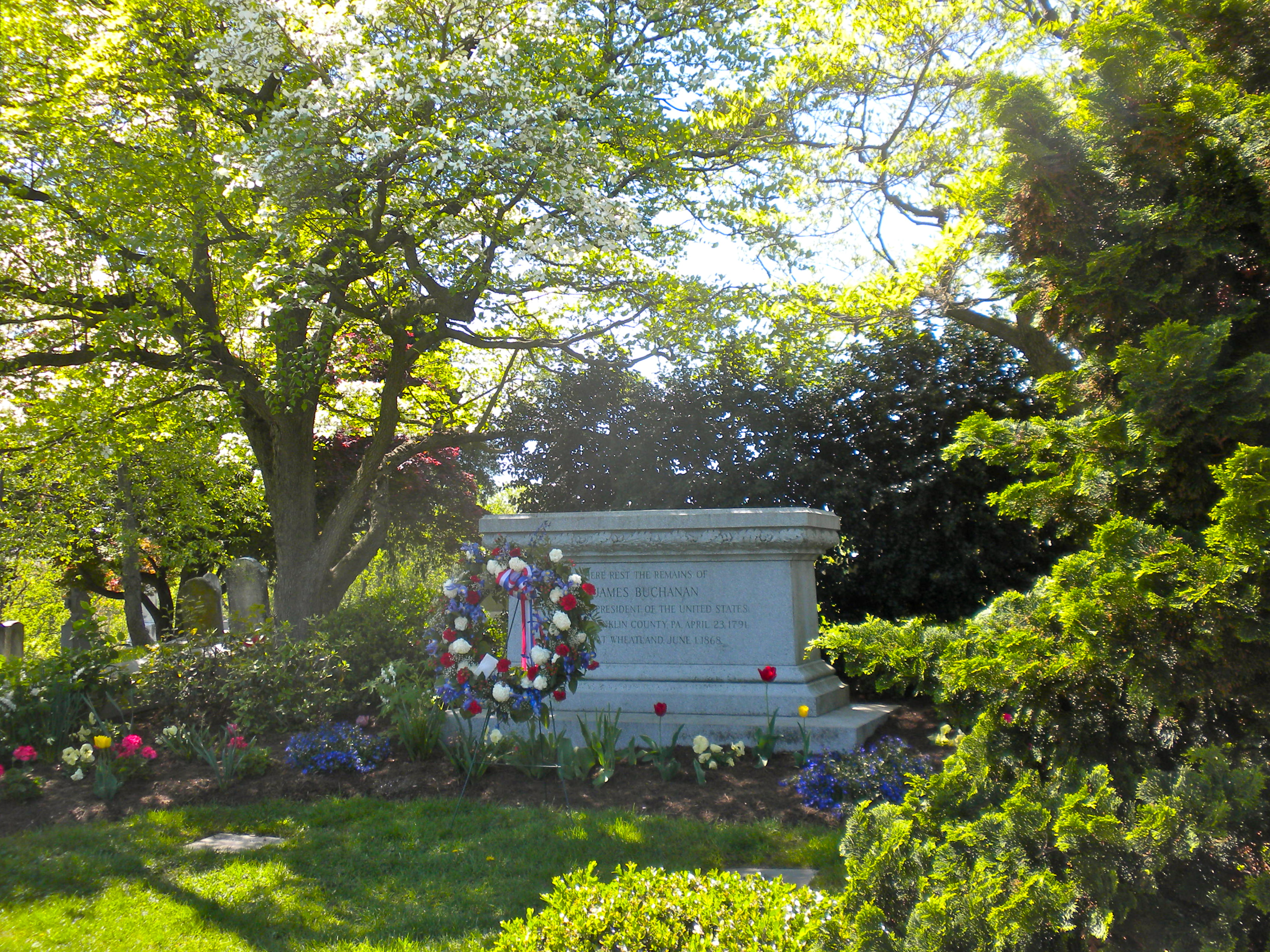
- The grave of President James Buchanan
- Interactive map of Woodward Hill Cemetery

Details
- Established: 1849 (incorporated 1851)
- Location: Bounded by Strawberry, South Queen, and Chesapeake Streets; Lancaster, Pennsylvania
- Country: United States
- Coordinates: 40°1′34″N 76°18′6″W
- Type: Non-denominational
- Size: 32 acres (13 ha)
- Website: http://www.woodwardhillcemetery.com/
- Find a Grave: Woodward Hill Cemetery
- The Political Graveyard: Woodward Hill Cemetery
- Woodward Hill Cemetery
- U.S. National Register of Historic Places
- U.S. Historic district
- NRHP reference No.: 05000098
- Added to NRHP: February 24, 2005

Woodward Hill Cemetery is a 32-acre historic rural or garden cemetery in Lancaster, Pennsylvania. The cemetery's creation was initiated by the Trinity Lutheran Church of Lancaster in October 1849. Land was subsequently purchased by the church, a board of trustees was elected on November 4, 1850, and the burial ground was incorporated by an act of the Pennsylvania State Senate in 1851. It then officially became a non-denominational cemetery on February 2, 1852, when the property was transferred from the church to a group of stockholders.

Best known for being the burial place of James Buchanan, the 15th President of the United States, Woodward Hill Cemetery was added to the National Register of Historic Places in 2005.

== History ==
On October 3, 1849, leaders of the Trinity Lutheran Church in Lancaster formally decided to begin the process to create a new cemetery for Lancaster County, Pennsylvania. A committee appointed by church leaders on November 10, 1849, subsequently reported back to church leaders that it had purchased "twelve acres, one quarter, and thirty perches" of land from Em. C. Reigert, esquire, and a board of trustees was elected by members of the church on November 4, 1850.

Woodward Hill Cemetery was then officially incorporated by the Pennsylvania State Senate in April 1851, following several months of debate by the Senate and the Pennsylvania House of Representatives.

Following requests by members of the public that the cemetery be a non-denominational burial ground, preparations were made to transfer the cemetery's ownership to a group of stockholders, which led the cemetery to being officially declared a non-sectarian facility on February 2, 1852.

The cemetery became more widely known nationwide just over fifteen years later when James Buchanan, the fifteenth president of the United States was buried here on June 4, 1868, following his death three days earlier at Wheatland, his Lancaster County home, from respiratory failure. He was seventy-seven years old at the time of his death. Reporters for local newspapers noted that Buchanan's casket was "followed to the grave by the largest cortege that ever attended the funeral obsequies of any President who died out of office." Lancaster's Intelligencer Journal added:

"The magnificent and imposing funeral parade of yesterday was a spontaneous tribute of respect from the masses. Without distinction of party, the people of Lancaster city and county turned out to pay a last and fitting tribute of respect to their most distinguished fellow-citizen. All party animosities were forgotten, and with a generous spirit that was most honorable, those who had been Mr. Buchanan's bitterest political opponents vied with his personal friends in doing honor to the illustrious dead. A delegation from the Congress of the United States; the Mayor, City Council, Judges, Aldermen, and other official officers of New York city, with a delegation from the City Councils of Baltimore, were present in line of the procession. Large delegations from Philadelphia, Harrisburg and York, comprising many of the most prominent citizens took part in the imposing parade....
"The scene at the burial place was not the least imposing of this interesting day. The paths of Woodward Cemetery were lined with ladies and children from noon till the sound of the funeral trumpets were heard descending the slop of the Marietta turnpike.... When the large procession arrived, to the thud of muffled drums and the long plaintive peal of the trumpets, those persons who constituted the advance body—firemen, beneficial associations, etc., formed in line on either side of the turnpike while the Masons, lawyers and the numerous carriages and strange guests filed through them. It was a scene of solemn and yet imposing interest, the music stirring the foliage and silencing the birds among the trees, sounded strong, soft, dirge-like by turns; and to its heavy pulses the feet of the people fell, until at last the hearse moving among them all brought the President of the United States to his last palace, where he shall be laid away to the fame to which the sober memory and verdict of men will consign him."

== Notable interments ==
- James Buchanan, the 15th President of the United States
- Benjamin Champneys, member of the Pennsylvania House of Representatives and Pennsylvania Senate. Pennsylvania Attorney General from 1846 to 1848
- Oliver James Dickey, member of the United States House of Representatives from 1869 to 1873
- Jacob Eichholtz, portrait painter
- William Walton Griest, member of the United States House of Representatives from 1909 to his death in 1929
- J. Roland Kinzer, member of the United States House of Representatives from 1930 to 1947
- Frederick Muhlenberg, member of the Continental Congress and the first Speaker of the United States House of Representatives
- Gotthilf Heinrich Ernst Muhlenberg, botanist and naturalist (identified the bog turtle), first President of Franklin College
- John Andrew Shulze, sixth Governor of Pennsylvania and nephew of Frederick Muhlenberg
- Susan Kimmell Shulze, First Lady of Pennsylvania from 1823 to 1829 and wife of John Andrew Shulze
- Abraham Herr Smith, member of the United States House of Representatives from 1873 to 1885.
- Daniel Strickler, Lieutenant Governor of Pennsylvania (1947–1951)

== See also ==
- List of burial places of presidents and vice presidents of the United States
