= Jacob Eichholtz =

American painter (1776-1842)

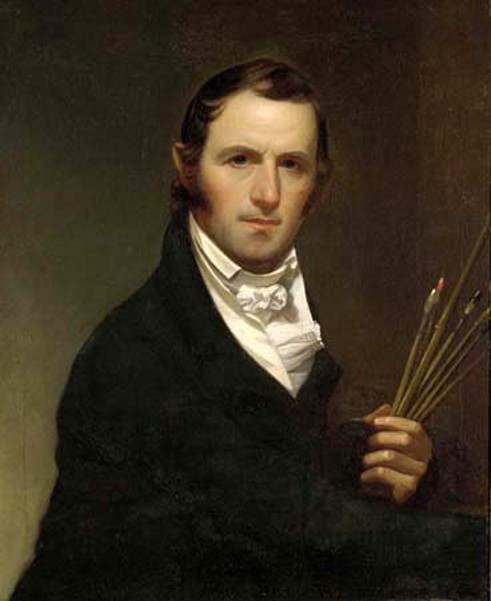
Jacob Eichholtz's self-portrait, 1810

Jacob Eichholtz (1776–1842) was an early American painter, known primarily for his portraits in the Romantic Victorian tradition. Born in Lancaster, Pennsylvania in a family of prosperous Pennsylvania Germans, he spent most of his professional life in Philadelphia. A coppersmith by trade, he turned to painting and achieved both recognition and success despite being mainly self-taught as an artist. He is known to have painted over 800 portraits over the course of 35 years. Hundreds of his works are housed in art museums, historical societies, and private collections throughout the United States.

== Early life ==
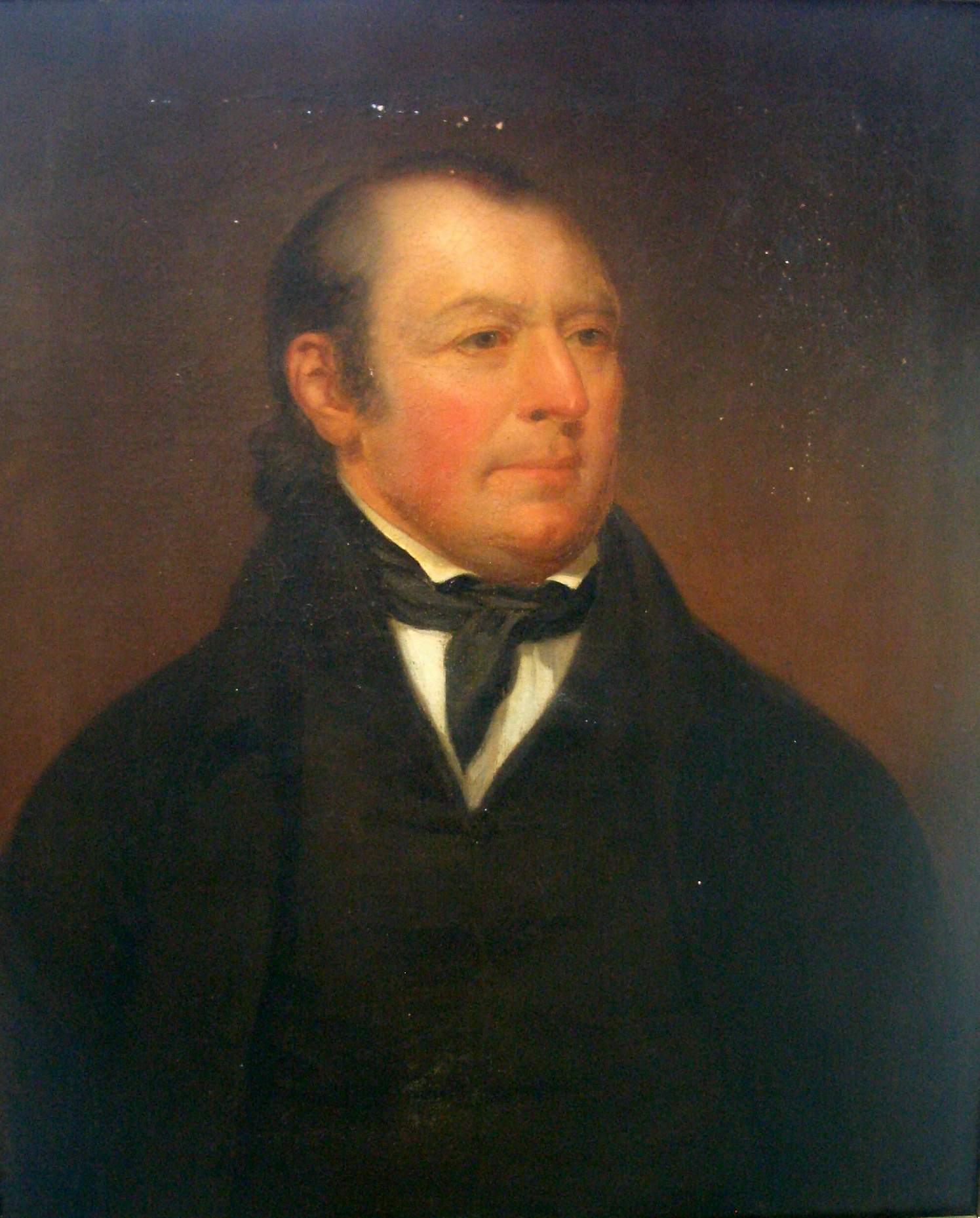
Leonard Eichholtz, portrait by Jacob Eichholtz. The painting was a gift to Jacob's brother. (Original owned by Dorothy Hartlieb.)

He was born to Leonard and Catharine Eichholtz, who owned and run the Bull's Head Tavern on East King Street in Lancaster; his father took part in the American Revolutionary War. At age 11, Jacob with his brothers attended the English School at Franklin College in Lancaster where he learned the three Rs — reading, 'riting and 'rithmetic. He also took lessons from a sign painter since his parents noticed his inclination to draw, but eventually he was apprenticed as a coppersmith. After his apprenticeship ended, he started as a tinsmith working with sheet iron. By 1805, Eichholtz opened his own shop in Lancaster where he, "mended sugar boxes, tinned copper kettles, and made coffee pots, wash basins, lanterns, stills, and funnels."

Eichholtz married Catharine Hatz Michael (1770–1817), a young widow with two children; they had four children of their own, Caroline, Catharine Maria, Rubens Mayer, and Margaret Amelia. In 1818, he married Catharine Trissler of Lancaster, and they had nine children, Edward, Anna Maria, Elizabeth Susanna, Benjamin West, Angelica Kauffman, Rebecca, Henry, Robert Lindsay, and Lavallyn Barry.

== From tinsmith to painter ==
From 1808 to 1812, Eichholtz hired several workers to work in the shop, and devoted most of his time to offering his fellow Lancastrians, at first, painted tinware, and then, small profile portraits on wood panels, in order to diversify his business and satisfy his passion for drawing. After developing his abilities as profile painter and gaining enough clients to sustain his family, Eichholtz decided to make painting his main vocation. In 1808, Eichholtz advertised that he "executes Portraits and Profile paintings" in the Lancaster's Intelligencer and Weekly Advertiser. In his own words, "I commenced the coppersmith business on my own account, with pretty good luck; still the more agreeable love of painting continually haunted me."

Two already established painters, James Peale and Thomas Sully, influenced Eichholtz. In 1808, James Peale visited Lancaster and became acquainted with Eichholtz, who commissioned Peale his portrait. Thomas Sully befriended Eichholtz when he was visiting Lancaster on business and accepted his invitation to work in his painting room. At that time, Sully was not impressed by Eichholtz's attempts in painting calling them hideous; however, he left him his brushes as a gift before leaving Lancaster. Later, Sully wrote that he was surprised and gratified to see how much Eichholtz's painting skills improved, and that, "Eichholtz would have made a first-rate painter had he began early in life with the usual advantages." During the winter of 1811–1812, Eichholtz traveled to Boston where he spent several weeks at the studio of Gilbert Stuart copying his works under Stuart's supervision. Stuart encouraged Eichholtz to continue painting. In 1815, Eichholtz sold his business and turned to painting. In 1820, he visited Baltimore to fulfill portrait commissions; he also worked in Pittsburgh and Delaware.

In 1823, Eichholtz moved to Philadelphia where he, as he later wrote, faced both, "an incessant practice of ten years, and constant employment." He was exhibiting with the Society of Artists at the Pennsylvania Academy of the Fine Arts.

== Later life and death ==
Eichholtz relocated back to Lancaster in 1830 where he died in 1842. He and his family were originally interred at Holy Trinity Lutheran Church on South Duke Street in Lancaster, Pennsylvania. In the early 1850s, Holy Trinity Church sought to expand its churchyard, so the church relocated the majority of gravestones and the remains to the new Woodward Hill Cemetery, Lot 33 of Area B, including the remains of Eichholtz and his family. Eichholtz was reburied in the same grave together with both of his wives and their children. By 2014, Eichholtz's gravestone, which was made of marble, had deteriorated due to age and acid rain, rendering the inscription illegible. Local historians have called for the restoration of his headstone, as well as the installation of a brass plaque at the grave site to mark his achievements.

== Recognition ==
For decades the artistic legacy of Jacob Eichholtz was overlooked. As time passed, a reassessment of the significance of his achievements took place and "his portraits of Thaddeus Stevens and James Buchanan are generally accepted as the best that were done of these statesmen."

== Gallery ==
Portraits by Jacob Eichholtz
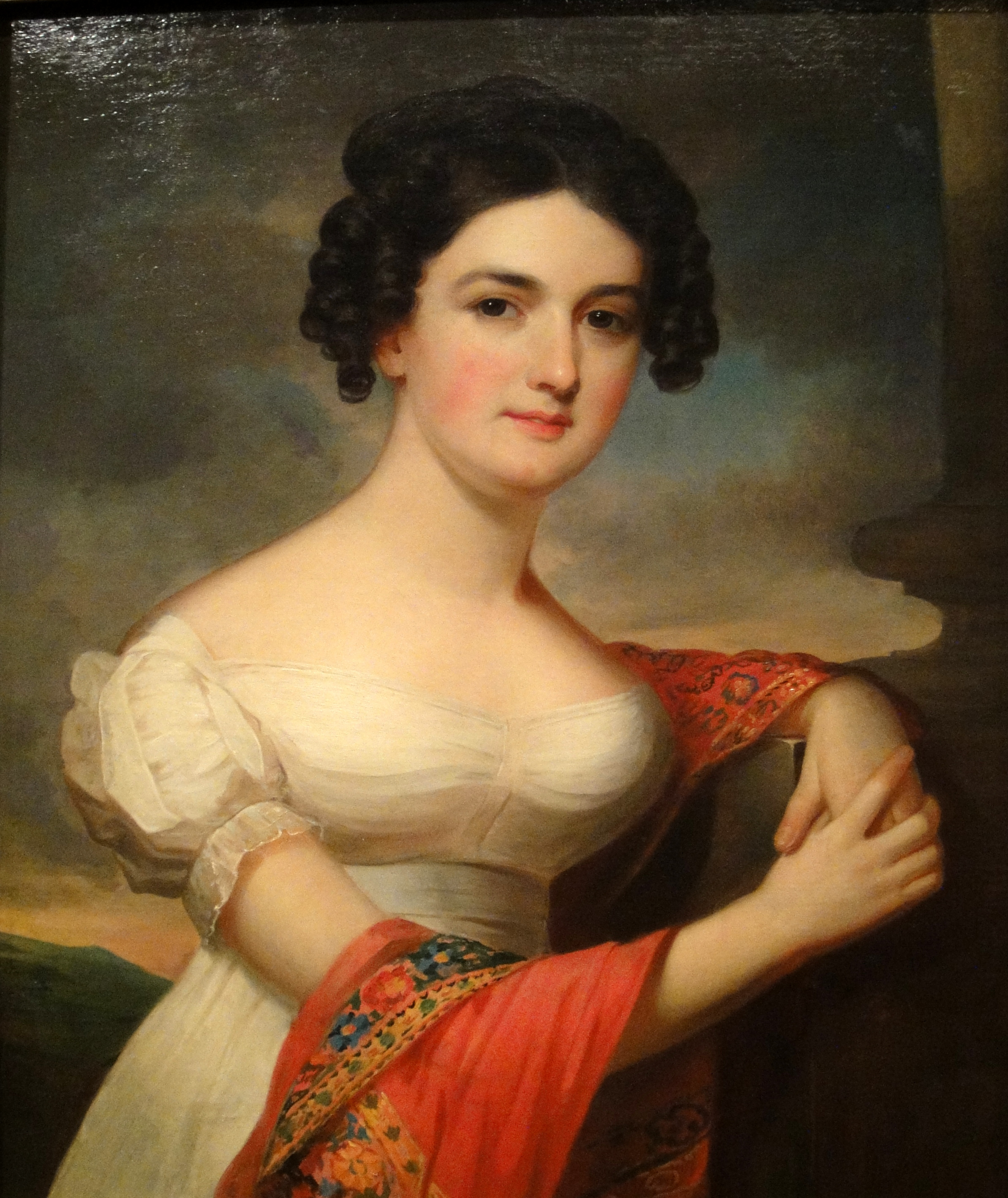
Julianna Hazelhurst, National Gallery of Art

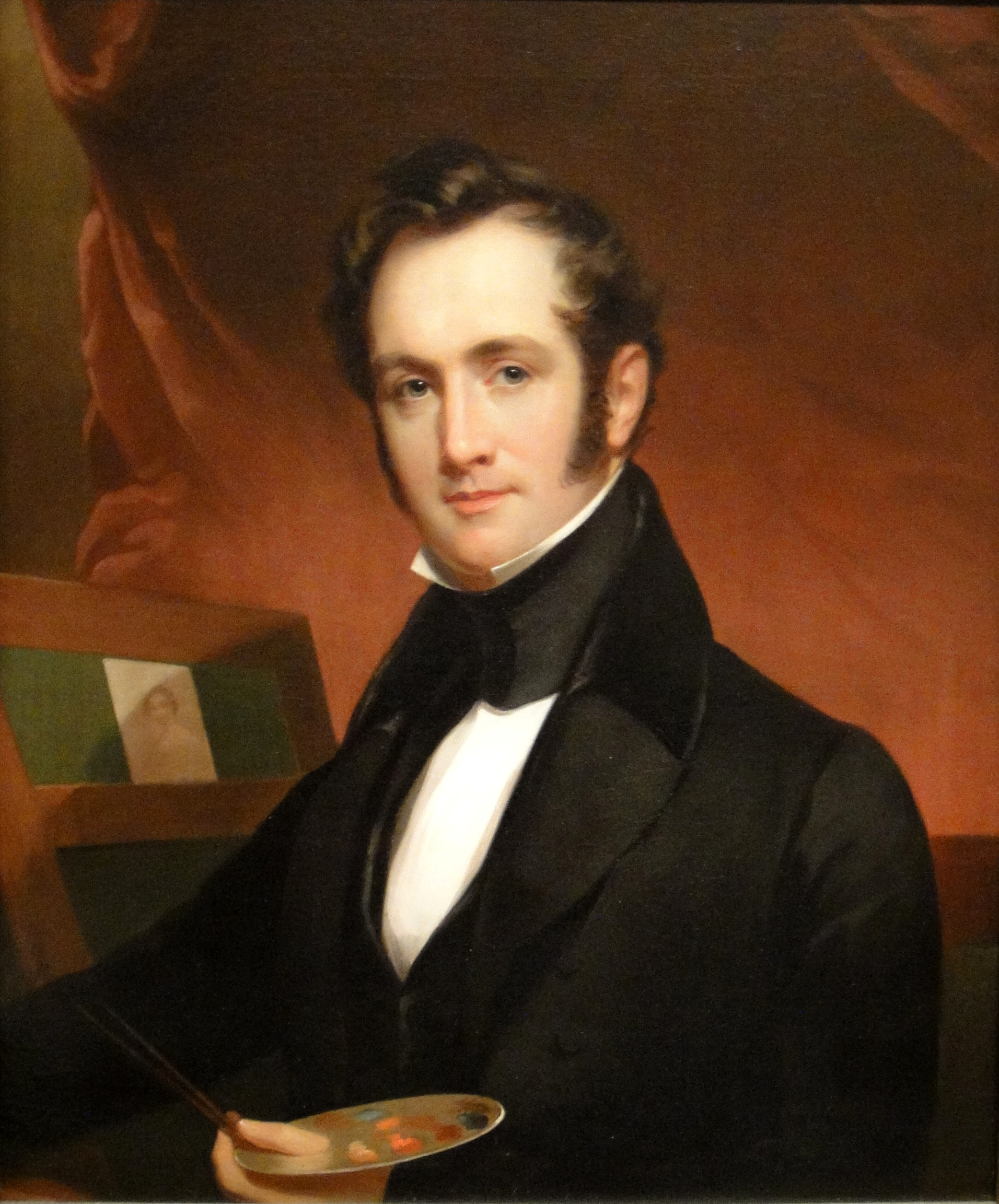
James P. Smith, National Gallery of Art

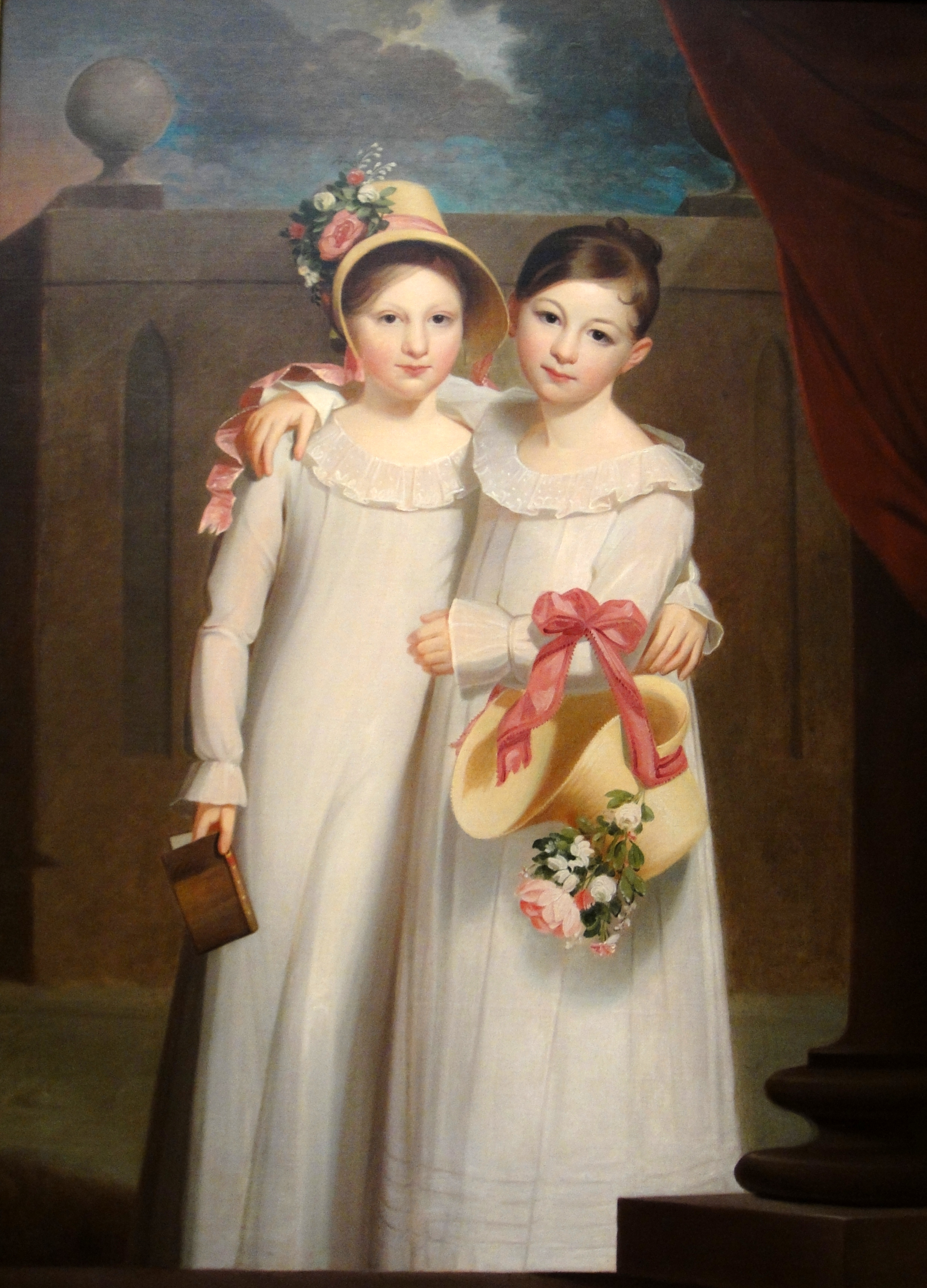
The Ragan Sisters, National Gallery of Art

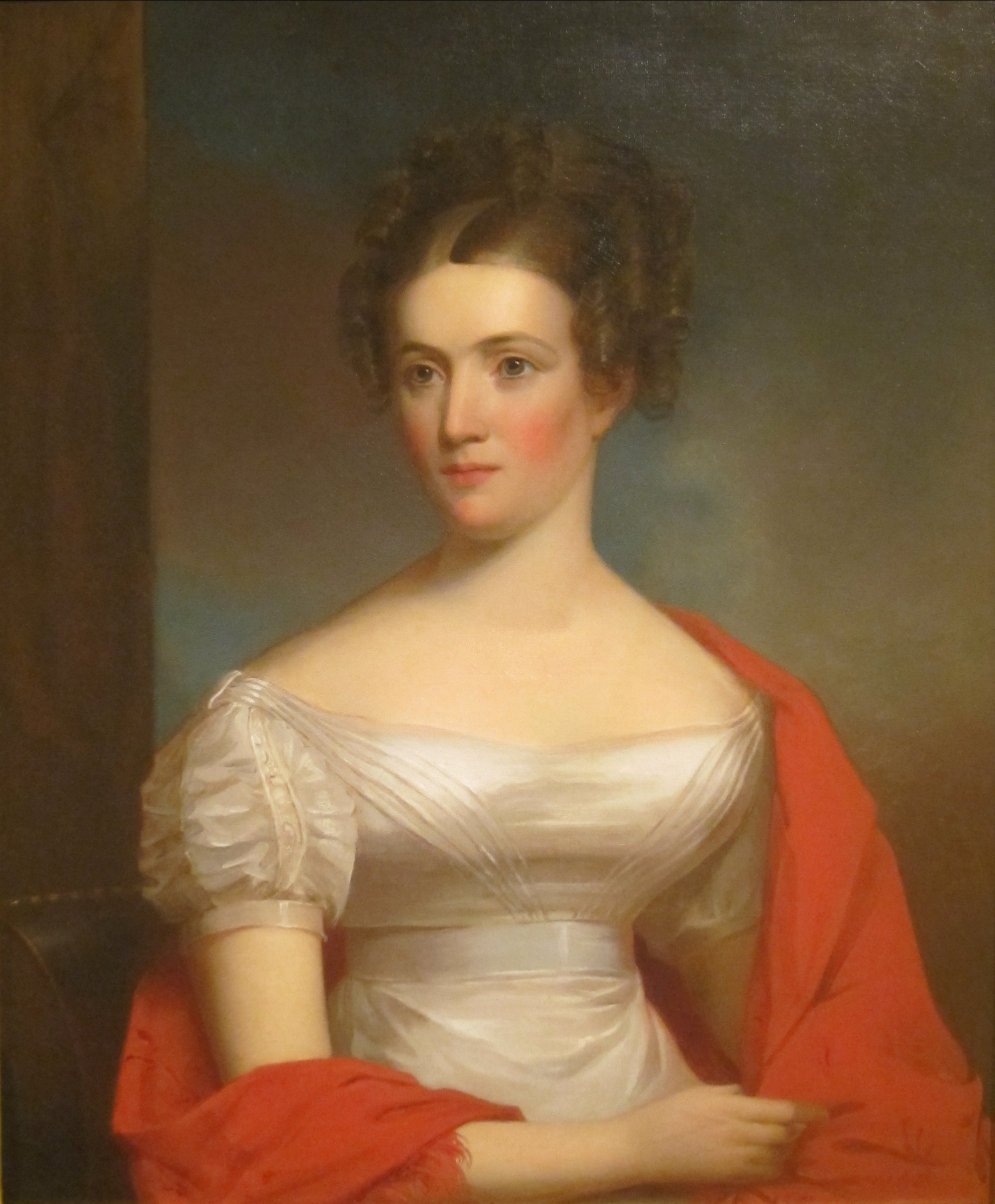
Mrs. Pierre Louis Laguerenne, El Paso Museum of Art

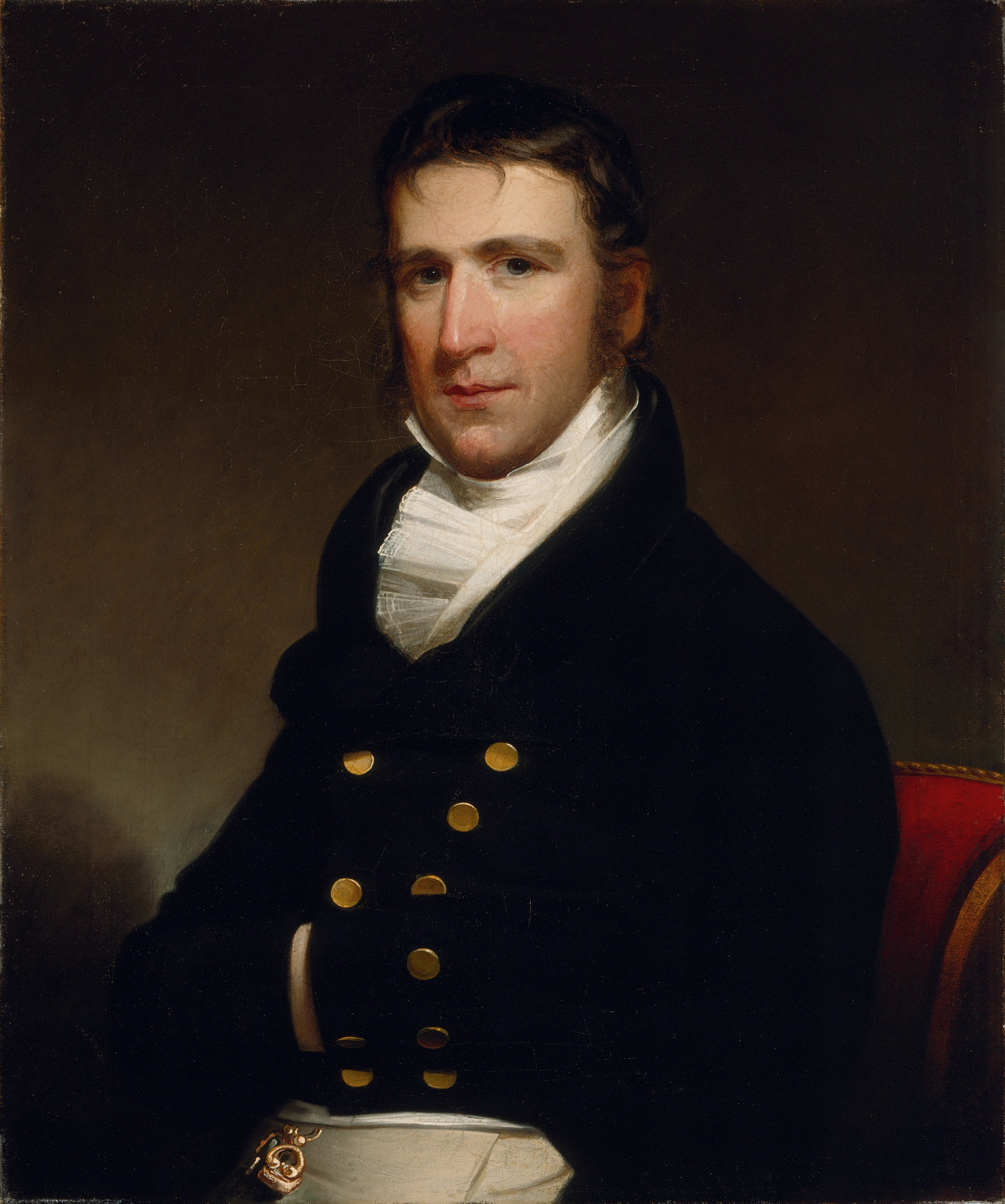
Elliott Tole Lane, Los Angeles County Museum of Art

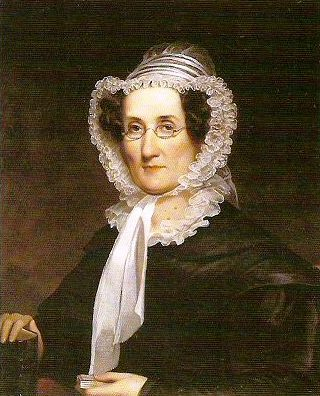
Lydia R. Bailey, Lancaster County Historical Society

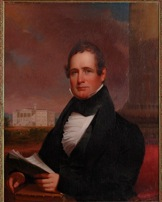
Thaddeus Stevens, Gettysburg College

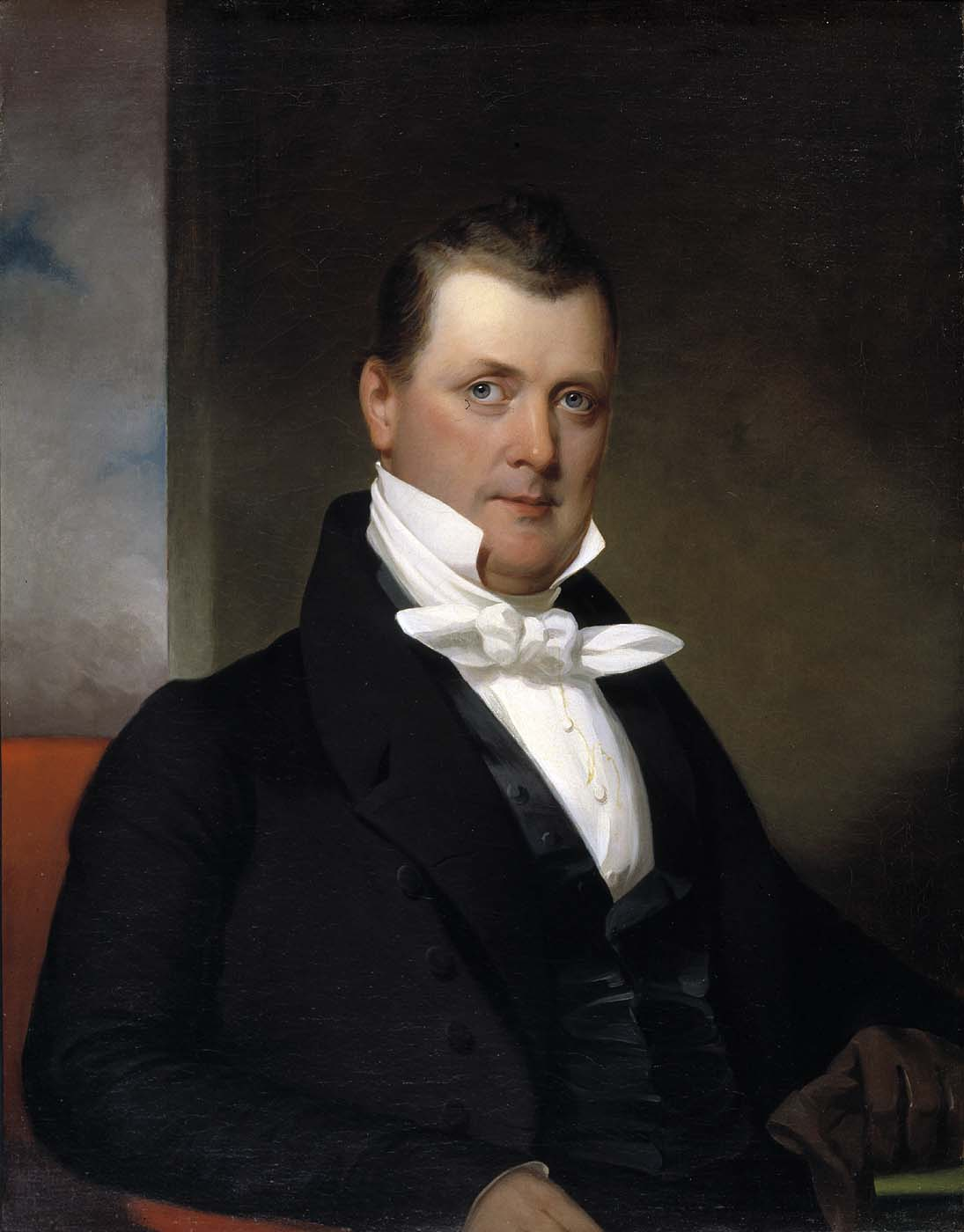
James Buchanan, Smithsonian American Art Museum

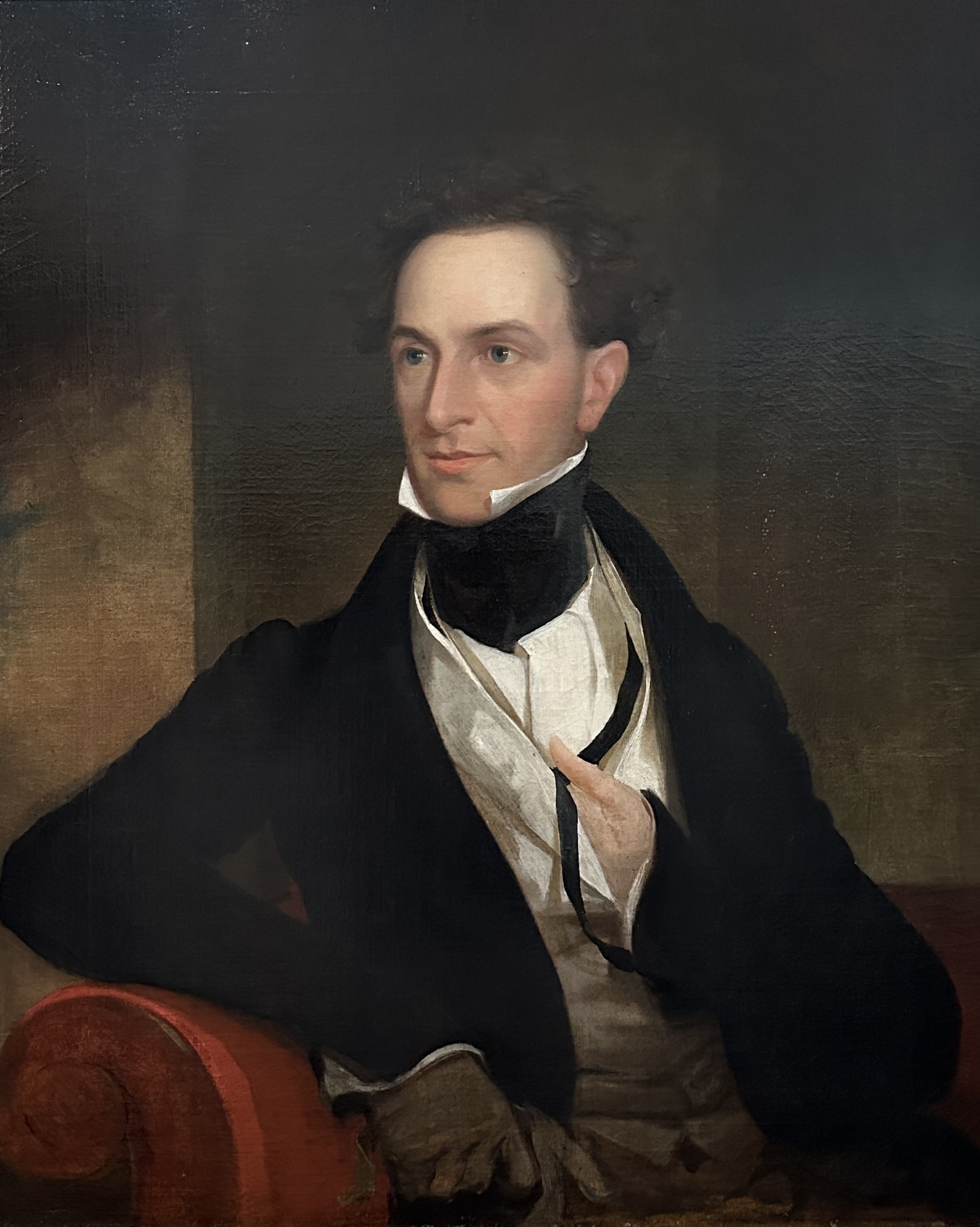
William Schley, Washington County Museum of Fine Arts
