= Medical Arts Building (Reading, Pennsylvania) =

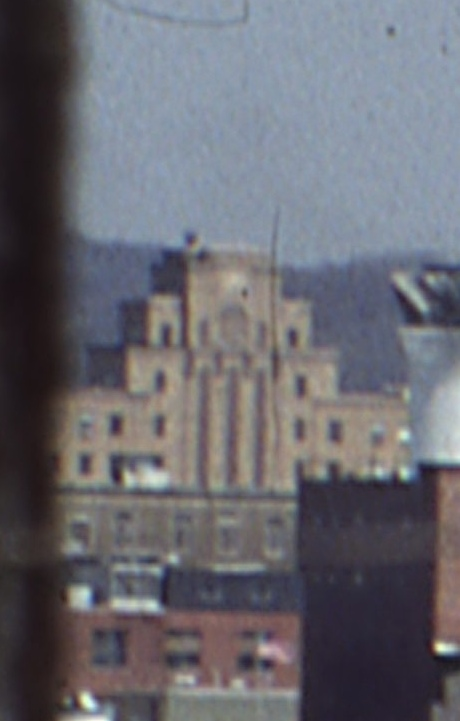
- The Medical Arts Building in 1984
- Interactive map of the Medical Arts Building area

General information
- Status: Completed
- Type: Office
- Architectural style: Art Deco
- Location: 230 North 5th Street, Reading, Pennsylvania, United States
- Coordinates: 40°20′22.09″N 75°55′41.40″W
- Completed: 1930

Height
- Roof: 144 ft (44 m)

Technical details
- Floor count: 12

Design and construction
- Architect: Frederick A. Muhlenberg

The Medical Arts Building in Reading, Pennsylvania is located at 230 North Fifth Street and was designed by Frederick A. Muhlenberg founder of Muhlenberg Greene Architects.

Built in 1930, the Medical Arts Building was developed and owned by the Reading Medical Arts Building Corporation. The board members of the corporation included architect Frederick A. Muhlenberg, who served as President of the Board. The building was constructed at a cost of, approximately, $500,000, and the project created employment for many during the Great Depression.

When completed, the 10-story building contained 55 offices, a pharmacy on the first floor, and a coffee shop located in the basement. The Medical Arts Building was the first building in Reading to have a penthouse space. The penthouse contained a kitchen, lounge and fireplace, and the space served as a club house for the building's tenants. Another feature of the building, which was not typical for office buildings of the time, had the rest rooms for men and women located on each floor of the building.

Mr. Muhlenberg eventually moved his architecture practice to the Medical Arts Building where the firm remained until 1972. The Medical Arts Building is still open and occupied.
