= George Baer Hiester =

American businessman

George Baer Hiester (March 7, 1909 – May 19, 1962) was a Berks County, Pennsylvania businessman.

Hiester was born in 1909 in Reading, Pennsylvania, the son of Isaac Hiester and Mary Kimmell Baer. His grandfathers were William Muhlenberg Hiester and George Frederick Baer. He graduated from the Hill School and attended Yale University. He married Anne Hall Nicholls in 1931 at Christ Episcopal Church in Reading.

Hiester is best known for his construction of Stokesay Castle on Mount Penn in Reading. Designed in 1932 by his cousin, architect Frederick Augustus Muhlenberg, founder of Muhlenberg Greene Architects, Stokesay was built to resemble the castle of the same name in England. Intended as a wedding gift for his wife, it served as his private residence until 1956, when it was converted to a restaurant.

George Hiester served in the Army in World War II and died in 1962. He is buried in Charles Evans Cemetery in Reading.

== See also ==
Knight's Pub at Stokesay Castle - Addition - Muhlenberg Greene Architects

History - Muhlenberg Greene Architects
