= Guy L. Moser =

American politician

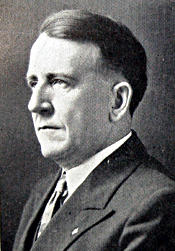

Member of the U.S. House of Representatives from Pennsylvania's 14th district
- In office January 3, 1937 – January 3, 1943
- Preceded by: William E. Richardson
- Succeeded by: Daniel K. Hoch

Personal details
- Born: January 23, 1886 Amity Township, Berks County, Pennsylvania, U.S.
- Died: May 9, 1961 (aged 75) Reading, Pennsylvania, U.S.
- Party: Democratic
- Education: Keystone State Normal School

Guy Louis Moser (January 23, 1886 – May 9, 1961) was a Democratic member of the U.S. House of Representatives from Pennsylvania.

Guy L. Moser was born on a farm in Amity Township, Berks County, Pennsylvania. He attended the Keystone State Normal School in Kutztown, Pennsylvania. He was engaged in painting and paperhanging from 1898 to 1904. He taught school in Amity Township in 1903 and 1904. He was a railway postal clerk from 1904 to 1914, and a post office inspector from 1914 to 1926. He was engaged in investment banking in Philadelphia, Pennsylvania, from 1926 to 1931 and later in agricultural pursuits. He was an unsuccessful candidate for the Democratic nomination for Congress in 1932 and 1934.

Moser was elected as a Democrat to the Seventy-fifth, Seventy-sixth, and Seventy-seventh Congresses. He served as Chairman of the United States House Committee on the Census during the Seventy-seventh Congress. He was an unsuccessful candidate for renomination in 1942 and for the Democratic nomination in 1944, 1948, and in 1950. After his time in Congress he resumed agricultural pursuits and also engaged in public speaking. He died in Reading, Pennsylvania.

== Sources ==
- United States Congress. "Guy L. Moser (id: M001026)". Biographical Directory of the United States Congress.
- The Political Graveyard

U.S. House of Representatives
Preceded by William E. Richardson	Member of the U.S. House of Representatives from Pennsylvania's 14th congressional district 1937–1943	Succeeded by Daniel K. Hoch
