= George M. Rhodes =

American politician

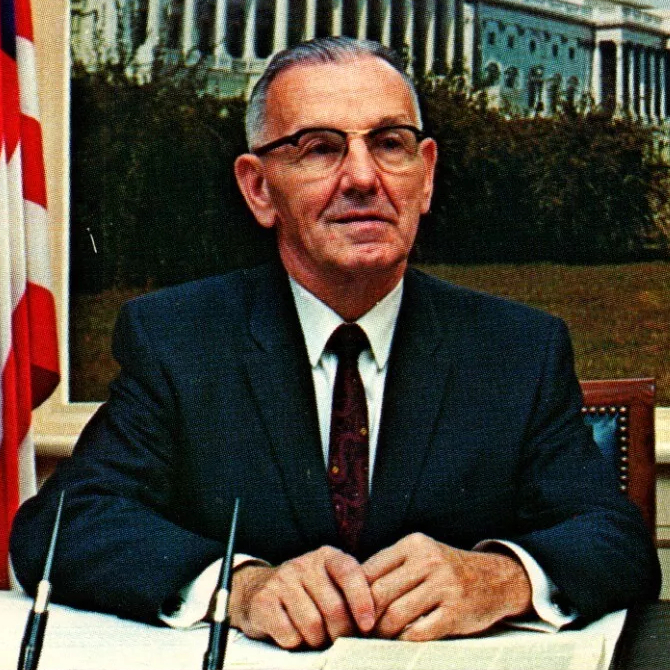
- Rhodes in 1968

Member of the U.S. House of Representatives from Pennsylvania
- In office January 3, 1949 – January 3, 1969
- Preceded by: Frederick A. Muhlenberg
- Succeeded by: Gus Yatron
- Constituency: 13th district (1949–1953); 14th district (1953–1963); 6th district (1963–1969)

Personal details
- Born: George Milton Rhodes; February 24, 1898 Reading, Pennsylvania, U.S.
- Died: October 23, 1978 (aged 80) Reading, Pennsylvania, U.S.
- Party: Socialist (before 1932); Democrat (after 1932)

George Milton Rhodes (February 24, 1898 – October 23, 1978) was an American World War I veteran who served as a Democratic member of the U.S. House of Representatives from Pennsylvania for ten terms from 1949 to 1969.

== Early life and career ==
George M. Rhodes was born in Reading, Pennsylvania. During the First World War he served in the United States Army.

=== Early career ===
He worked as a printer for the Reading Eagle Co. from 1913 to 1927, and business manager for the Reading Labor Advocate from 1927 to 1942. He was an A.F. of L. labor representative. He was editor and manager of the Lancaster New Era from 1942 to 1949.

He was President of Federated Trades Council, A.F. of L. Central Labor Union from 1928 to 1951 and a member of the Reading Housing Authority from 1938 to 1948.

=== Early affiliation with Socialist Party ===
A member of the Socialist Party of Pennsylvania, Rhodes was a delegate to its National Conventions in 1928 and 1932. He ran for local office several times on the Socialist ticket. In 1936, Rhodes was elected to the National Executive Committee of the Socialist Party of America. After he became a Democrat, he was a delegate to the Democratic National Conventions of 1952 and 1956.

=== Congress ===
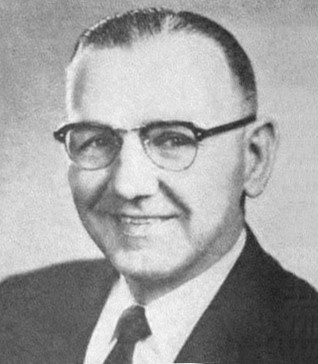
Rhodes c. 1957

He was elected as a Democrat to the 81st Congress in 1948, defeating incumbent Republican Congressman Frederick A. Muhlenberg, and re-elected to the nine succeeding Congresses (January 3, 1949 – January 3, 1969). He was not a candidate for reelection in 1968.

As a member of Congress, Rhodes was a supporter of collective bargaining rights. He worked with Senator Olin D. Johnston of South Carolina to introduce the Rhodes-Johnston bill, which would have recognized the collective bargaining rights of all federal workers. This bill never came to a vote due to objections from President Eisenhower, but a limited version of the proposal was later adopted by the administration of President John F. Kennedy in 1961.

== Death and legacy ==
He died in 1978 at the age of 80. The George M. Rhodes Apartments in Reading are named after him.

U.S. House of Representatives
Preceded by Frederick A. Muhlenberg	Member of the U.S. House of Representatives from Pennsylvania's 13th congressional district 1949–1953	Succeeded by Samuel K. McConnell Jr.
Preceded by Joseph L. Carrigg	Member of the U.S. House of Representatives from Pennsylvania's 14th congressional district 1953–1963	Succeeded by William S. Moorhead
Preceded by Herman Toll	Member of the U.S. House of Representatives from Pennsylvania's 6th congressional district 1963–1969	Succeeded by Gus Yatron
