= William Creighton Jr. =

American judge (1778–1851)

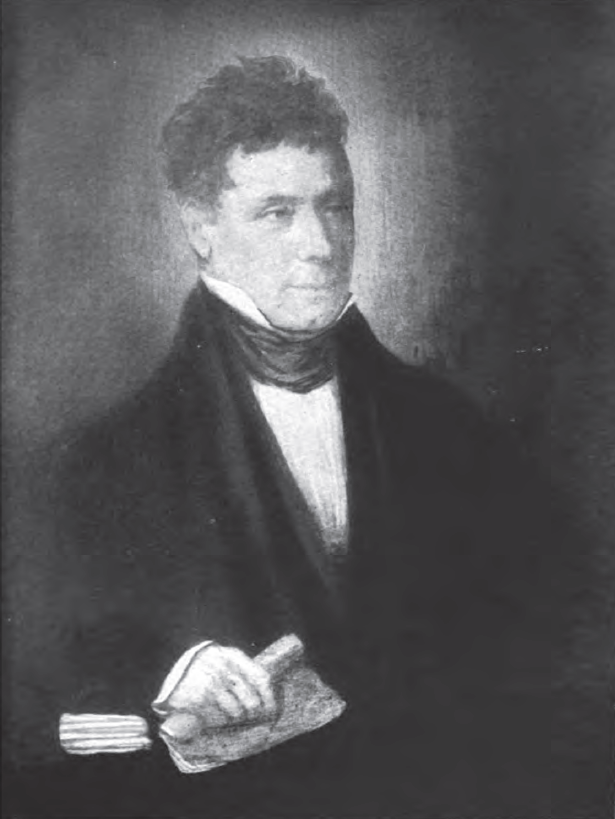

Judge of the United States District Court for the District of Ohio
- In office November 1, 1828 – March 3, 1829
- Appointed by: John Quincy Adams
- Preceded by: Charles Willing Byrd
- Succeeded by: John Wilson Campbell

Member of the U.S. House of Representatives from Ohio
- In office March 4, 1829 – March 3, 1833
- Preceded by: Francis Swaine Muhlenberg
- Succeeded by: Samuel Finley Vinton
- Constituency: 6th district
- In office March 4, 1827 – before November 1, 1828
- Preceded by: John Thomson
- Succeeded by: Francis Swaine Muhlenberg
- Constituency: 6th district
- In office March 4, 1813 – March 3, 1817
- Preceded by: District established
- Succeeded by: Levi Barber
- Constituency: 3rd district

1st Secretary of State of Ohio
- In office 1803–1808
- Governor: Edward Tiffin
- Preceded by: Office established
- Succeeded by: Jeremiah McLene

Personal details
- Born: William Creighton Jr. October 29, 1778 Berkeley County, Virginia
- Died: October 1, 1851 (aged 72) Chillicothe, Ohio, U.S.
- Resting place: Grand View Cemetery; Chillicothe, Ohio
- Party: Democratic-Republican; National Republican
- Education: Dickinson College read law

William Creighton Jr. (October 29, 1778 – October 1, 1851) was an American politician, state official, and judge who served as the first Ohio secretary of state, a United States representative from Ohio and a United States district judge of the United States District Court for the District of Ohio.

== Education and career ==
Born on October 29, 1778, in Berkeley County, Virginia (now West Virginia), Creighton graduated from Dickinson College in 1795 and read law in 1798. He was admitted to the bar and entered private practice in Chillicothe, Ross County, Northwest Territory (State of Ohio from March 1, 1803) from 1798 to 1803. He was the 1st Secretary of State of Ohio from 1803 to 1808. He resumed private practice in Chillicothe from 1808 to 1809. He was the United States Attorney for the District of Ohio from 1809 to 1811. He was a member of the Ohio House of Representatives in 1810. He again resumed private practice in Chillicothe from 1811 to 1812.

== Congressional service ==
Creighton was elected as a Democratic-Republican from Ohio's 3rd congressional district to the United States House of Representatives of the 13th United States Congress to fill the vacancy caused by the resignation of United States Representative Duncan McArthur. He was reelected to the 14th United States Congress and served from May 4, 1813, to March 3, 1817. He was an unsuccessful candidate for election in 1815 to the United States Senate from Ohio. He was elected as an Adams Republican from Ohio's 6th congressional district to the United States House of Representatives of the 20th United States Congress and served from March 4, 1827, until his resignation in 1828 to accept a federal judicial position. He was reelected as an Anti-Jacksonian to the United States House of Representatives of the 21st and 22nd United States Congresses, serving from March 4, 1829, to March 3, 1833. He was not a candidate for renomination in 1832. Following his first two terms in Congress, Creighton was President of the Chillicothe Branch of the Second Bank of the United States in 1817. In between his terms in Congress, Creighton engaged in private practice in Chillicothe from 1817 to 1827.

== Federal judicial service ==
Creighton received a recess appointment from President John Quincy Adams on November 1, 1828, to a seat on the United States District Court for the District of Ohio vacated by Judge Charles Willing Byrd. He was nominated to the same position by President Adams on December 11, 1828. His service terminated on March 3, 1829, after his nomination was not confirmed by the United States Senate, which never voted on his nomination. The Senate on February 16, 1829, passed a resolution that it was “not expedient to fill the vacancy at the present session of Congress.”

== Later career and death ==
Following the termination of his federal judicial service, Creighton resumed private practice in Chillicothe from 1833 to 1851. He died on October 8, 1851, in Chillicothe. He was interred in Grand View Cemetery in Chillicothe.

== Family ==
Creighton had married Elizabeth Meade in September 1805, and they had six daughters and three sons.

== Sources ==
- United States Congress. "William Creighton Jr. (id: C000902)". Biographical Directory of the United States Congress.
- William Creighton Jr. at the Biographical Directory of Federal Judges, a publication of the Federal Judicial Center.

Political offices
Preceded by Office established	1st Secretary of State of Ohio; 1803–1808	Succeeded by Jeremiah McLene
Ohio House of Representatives
Preceded by James Dunlap; Joseph Gardner; Nathaniel Massie; David Shelby; Edward Tiffin	Representative from Ross County; 1810–1811; Served alongside: Henry Brush, Abraham Claypool, James Manary, Edward Tiffin	Succeeded by Abraham Claypool; Samuel Monett; Thomas Renick; David Shelby; William Sterrett as Representatives from Ross and Pickaway Counties
U.S. House of Representatives
Preceded by Duncan McArthur	United States Representative from Ohio's 3rd congressional district 1813–1817	Succeeded by Levi Barber
Preceded by John Thomson	United States Representative from Ohio's 6th congressional district 1827–1828	Succeeded by Francis Swaine Muhlenberg
Preceded by Francis Swaine Muhlenberg	United States Representative from Ohio's 6th congressional district 1829–1833	Succeeded by Samuel Finley Vinton
Legal offices
Preceded by Michael Baldwin	United States Attorney for the District of Ohio; 1804–1810	Succeeded by Samuel Herrick
Preceded by Charles Willing Byrd	Judge of the United States District Court for the District of Ohio; 1828–1829	Succeeded by John Wilson Campbell
