= Daniel K. Hoch =

American politician

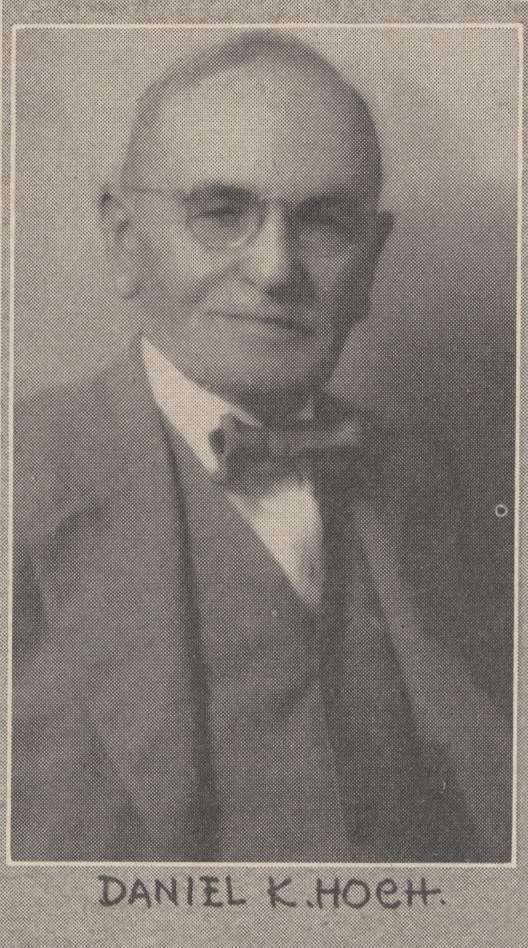
- Hoch, pictured in a portrait for the 79th United States Congress

Member of the U.S. House of Representatives from Pennsylvania
- In office January 3, 1943 – January 3, 1947
- Preceded by: Guy L. Moser
- Succeeded by: Frederick Augustus Muhlenberg
- Constituency: 14th district (1943–1945); 13th district (1945–1947)

Member of the Pennsylvania House of Representatives
- In office 1899–1901

Personal details
- Born: January 31, 1866 Reading, Pennsylvania, U.S.
- Died: October 11, 1960 (aged 94) Reading, Pennsylvania, U.S.
- Party: Democratic

Daniel Knabb Hoch (January 31, 1866 – October 11, 1960) was a Democratic member of the U.S. House of Representatives from Pennsylvania.

== Biography ==
Daniel Hoch was born on a farm near Reading, Pennsylvania. He served a printing apprenticeship on a Reading newspaper and worked in various departments of the newspaper. He was a member of the Pennsylvania State House of Representatives from 1899 to 1901, and a delegate to the Democratic National Convention in 1908. He was controller of Berks County, PA from 1912 to 1916, and a trustee of St. Matthew's Lutheran Church since 1937. He was elected as a Democrat to the 78th and 79th Congresses. He was an unsuccessful candidate for reelection in 1946.

== Sources ==
- United States Congress. "Daniel K. Hoch (id: H000668)". Biographical Directory of the United States Congress.

U.S. House of Representatives
Preceded by Guy L. Moser	Member of the U.S. House of Representatives from Pennsylvania's 14th congressional district 1943–1945	Succeeded by Wilson D. Gillette
Preceded by Ivor D. Fenton	Member of the U.S. House of Representatives from Pennsylvania's 13th congressional district 1945–1947	Succeeded by Frederick A. Muhlenberg
