= Oliver James Dickey =

American politician

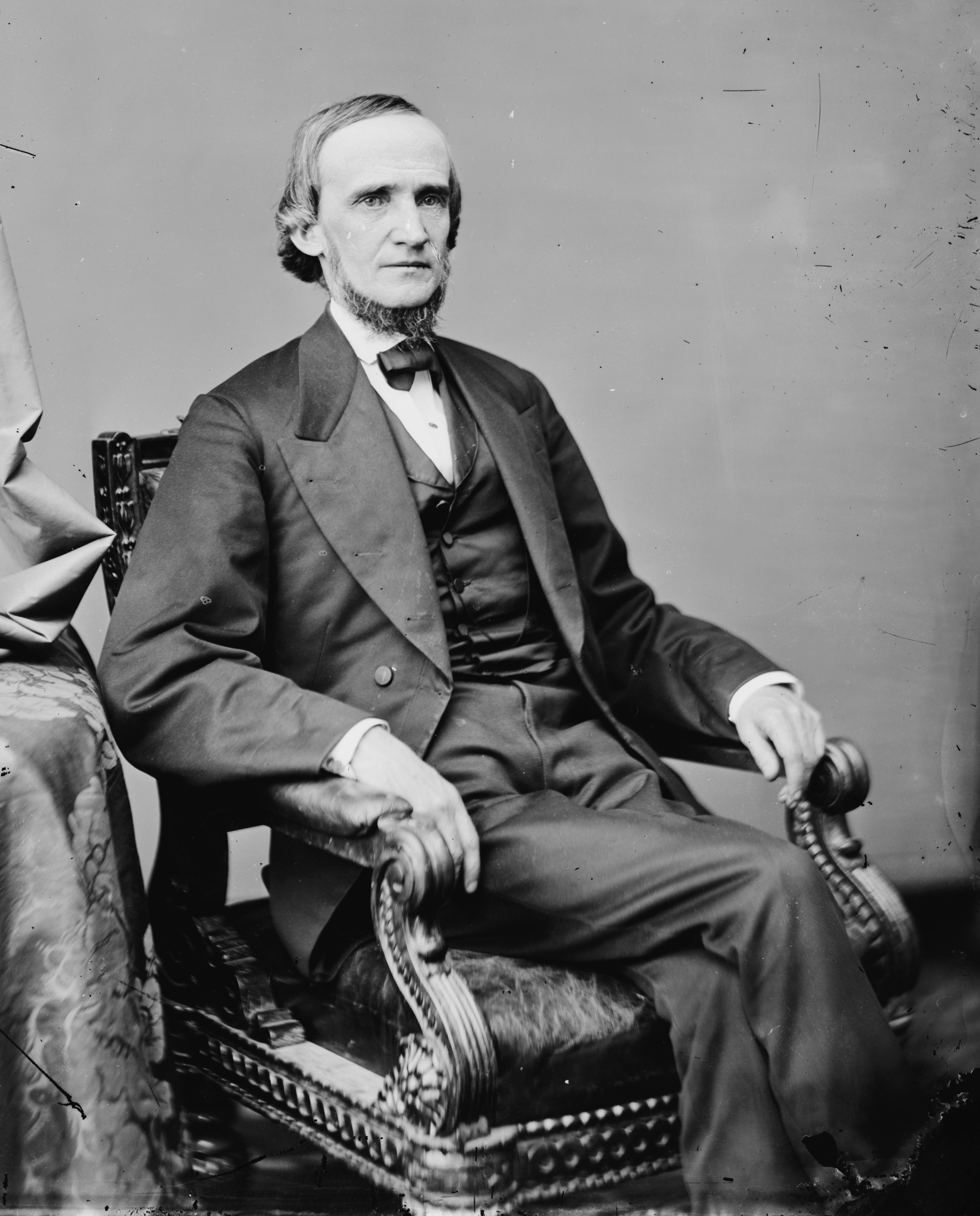

Member of the U.S. House of Representatives from Pennsylvania's 9th district
- In office December 7, 1868 – March 3, 1873
- Preceded by: Thaddeus Stevens
- Succeeded by: A. Herr Smith

Personal details
- Born: April 6, 1823 Brighton, Pennsylvania, US
- Died: April 21, 1876 (aged 53) Lancaster, Pennsylvania, US
- Party: Republican
- Education: Dickinson College
- Profession: Politician

Oliver James Dickey (April 6, 1823 – April 21, 1876) was a Republican member of the U.S. House of Representatives from Pennsylvania.

== Biography ==
Oliver J. Dickey (son of John Dickey) was born in Old Brighton, Pennsylvania. He attended Beaver Academy and Dickinson College in Carlisle, Pennsylvania. He studied law, was admitted to the bar at Lancaster, Pennsylvania, in 1844 and practiced. He served as district attorney of Lancaster County, Pennsylvania, from 1856 to 1859. During the American Civil War, Dickey served as lieutenant colonel of the Tenth Regiment, Pennsylvania Volunteers.

Dickey was elected as a Republican to the Fortieth Congress to fill the vacancy caused by the death of Thaddeus Stevens and on the same day was elected to the Forty-first Congress. He was reelected to the Forty-second Congress. He was not a candidate for renomination in 1872. He was a delegate to the State constitutional convention at Harrisburg, Pennsylvania in 1873. He resumed the practice of law in Lancaster and died in 1876. He was interred in Woodward Hill Cemetery.

U.S. House of Representatives
| Preceded by Thaddeus Stevens | Member of the U.S. House of Representatives from Pennsylvania's 9th congressional district 1868-1873 | Succeeded by Abraham Herr Smith |
