= A. Herr Smith =

American politician

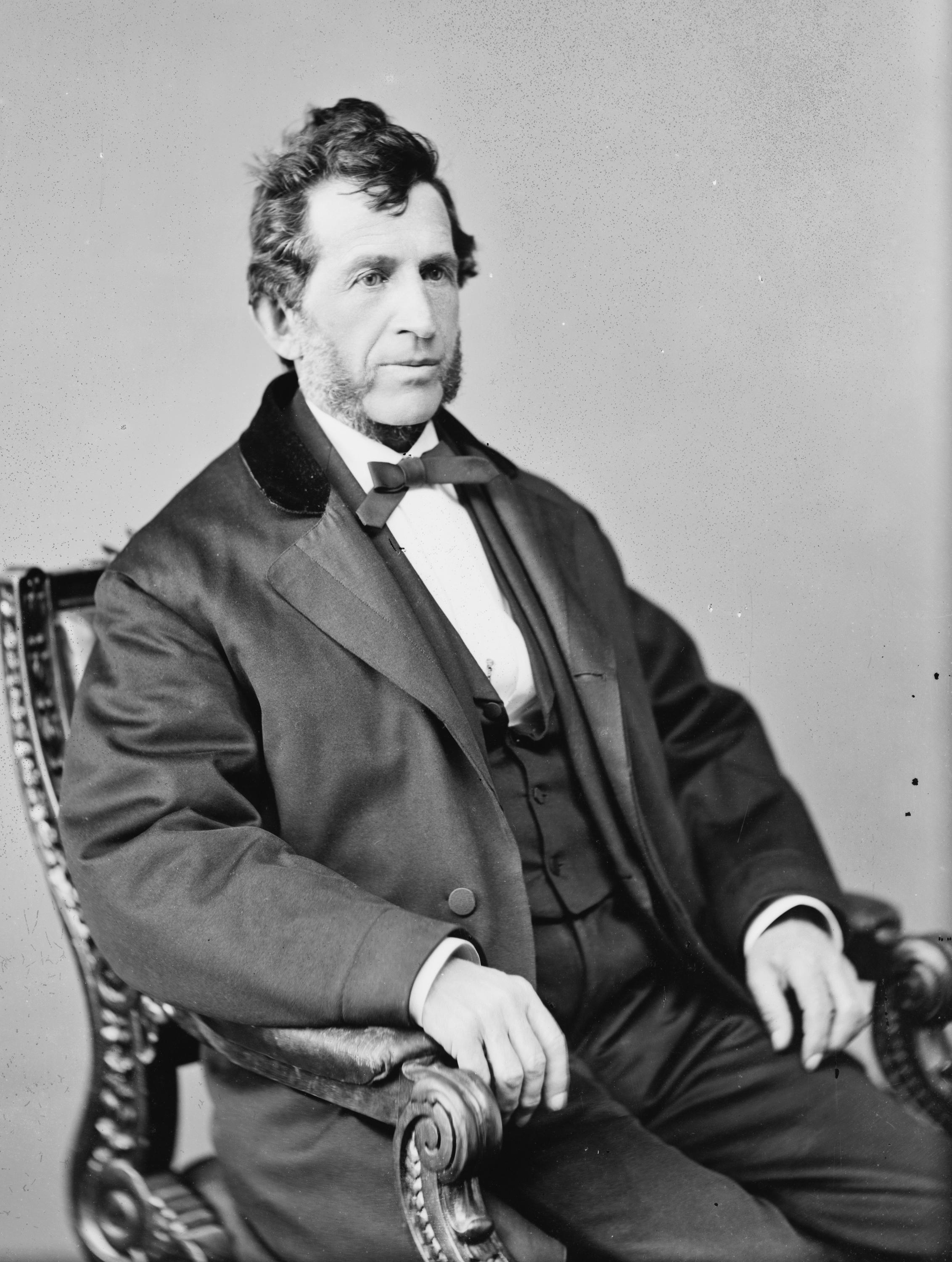

Member of the U.S. House of Representatives from Pennsylvania's 9th district
- In office March 4, 1873 – March 3, 1885
- Preceded by: Oliver James Dickey
- Succeeded by: John Andrew Hiestand

Member of the Pennsylvania Senate from the 7th district
- In office 1845–1848
- Preceded by: Levi Kline
- Succeeded by: Joseph Konigmacher

Member of the Pennsylvania House of Representatives
- In office 1843–1844

Personal details
- Born: March 7, 1815 Near Millersville, Pennsylvania, US
- Died: February 16, 1894 (aged 78) Lancaster, Pennsylvania, US
- Party: Republican
- Education: Dickinson College
- Profession: Politician

Abraham Herr Smith (March 7, 1815 – February 16, 1894) was an American politician who served as a Republican member of the U.S. House of Representatives for Pennsylvania's 9th congressional district from 1873 to 1885.

== Early life and education ==
Smith was born near Millersville, Pennsylvania to Jacob Smith and Elizabeth Herr. His parents died when he was eight years old and he was raised by his paternal grandparents.

He attended Professor Beck's Academy at Lititz, Pennsylvania, studied at Harrington College, and then graduated from Dickinson College in Carlisle, Pennsylvania in 1840. After completing his law studies, he was admitted to the bar in 1842, and commenced practice in Lancaster, Pennsylvania.

== Career ==
He served as a Whig member of the Pennsylvania State House of Representatives from 1843 to 1844 and in the Pennsylvania State Senate for the 7th district from 1845 to 1848.

Smith was elected as a Republican to the Forty-third and to the five succeeding Congresses. He served as chairman of the United States House Committee on Mileage during the Forty-seventh Congress, and served for six years on the War Claims Committee and the Appropriations Committee.

An unsuccessful candidate for renomination in 1884, he resumed the practice of law, and died in Lancaster in 1894. He was interred in the Woodward Hill Cemetery.

== Legacy ==
The A. Herr Smith Memorial Hall in the Denny Hall building of the Union Philosophical Society at Dickinson College was named in his honor.

== Sources ==
- United States Congress. "A. Herr Smith (id: S000509)". Biographical Directory of the United States Congress.
- The Political Graveyard

Pennsylvania House of Representatives
Preceded by	Member of the Pennsylvania House of Representatives; 1843-1844	Succeeded by
Pennsylvania State Senate
Preceded by Levi Kline	Member of the Pennsylvania Senate, 7th district 1845-1848	Succeeded by Joseph Konigmacher
U.S. House of Representatives
Preceded by Oliver J. Dickey	Member of the U.S. House of Representatives from Pennsylvania's 9th congressional district 1873–1885	Succeeded by John A. Hiestand
