= William E. Richardson =

American politician

William Emanuel Richardson (September 3, 1886 – November 3, 1948) was a Democratic member of the U.S. House of Representatives from Pennsylvania.

== Biography ==
Richardson was born on a farm (the old Daniel Boone homestead) near Stonersville, Pennsylvania. He moved to Bernville, Pennsylvania, with his parents at an early age, where he attended the public schools. He graduated from Princeton University in 1910, and from Columbia Law School in New York City in 1913. He was admitted to the bar the same year and commenced practice in Reading, Pennsylvania.

In 1914, he served with Ambulance Americaine, in Belgium and France in 1915, and with Squadron A, New York Cavalry, on the Mexico–United States border in 1916. During the First World War he was commissioned a second lieutenant on August 15, 1917, and served with the Eightieth Cavalry Division, United States Army, and later with the Seventh Machine Gun Battalion, Third Division, and was discharged a first lieutenant on September 15, 1919. After the war resumed the practice of law in Reading.

Richardson was elected as a Democrat to the Seventy-third and Seventy-fourth Congresses. He was an unsuccessful candidate for renomination in 1936. He attended the Interparliamentary Union Conference in Budapest, Hungary, in 1936.

== Death and interment ==
Richardson died in Wyomissing, Pennsylvania, with interment in Schwartzwald Cemetery in Jacksonwald, Pennsylvania.

== Sources ==
- United States Congress. "William E. Richardson (id: R000230)". Biographical Directory of the United States Congress.
- The Political Graveyard

U.S. House of Representatives
Preceded by Norton L. Litchtenwalner	Member of the U.S. House of Representatives from Pennsylvania's 14th congressional district 1933–1937	Succeeded by Guy L. Moser
