= Henry Melchior Muhlenberg Richards =

American military officer (1848–1935)

- Born: Henry Melchior Muhlenberg Richards; August 16, 1848; Easton, Pennsylvania, U.S.
- Died: September 28, 1935 (aged 87); Lebanon, Pennsylvania, U.S.
- Burial place: Charles Evans Cemetery
- Education: United States Naval Academy
- Military career
- Allegiance: United States of America
- Branch: Union Army
- Service years: 1864-1878
- Rank: Captain
- Commands: Spanish–American War
- Conflicts: American Civil War; Gettysburg campaign; Battle of Gettysburg; Spanish–American War; Blockade of Cuba; Bombardment of San Juan; Battle of Santiago de Cuba

Henry Melchior Muhlenberg Richards (August 16, 1848 – September 28, 1935) was an American military officer who served in the Union Army during the American Civil War and then as a captain in the United States Navy during the Spanish–American War. He was a member of the Muhlenberg family, a United States political, religious, and military dynasty based in the state of Pennsylvania. Muhlenberg College (an ELCA affiliated institution) in Allentown, Pennsylvania is named in the family's honor.

Richards was the grandson of Matthias Richards and great-grandson of Henry Muhlenberg. In 1905, the college purchased and relocated to a 51-acre (21 ha) tract located in Allentown's West End, the site of today's campus. Richards commanded regiments and campaigns during the Spanish-American War. Richards was also a published author, writer and wrote numerous books. His wife Ella was also a descendant of the Van Leer Family, some the earliest settlers of the Pennsylvania Colony who built a wealthy iron business and Van Leer's were descendants of a noble mayor Werner Von Loehr of Mainz.

== Early life and education ==
Henry Melchior Muhlenberg Richards moved to Reading, Pennsylvania, with his parents as a small child and graduated from its high school in 1864. His father was a prominent local minister and his grandfather Matthias Richards was a member of the United States House of Representatives from Pennsylvania and a judge, who had served as an officer during the American Revolutionary War. His grandmother was the youngest child of Henry Melchior Muhlenberg. The Muhlenberg family home is historic home in Trappe Pennsylvania and on the property are the remains of a pottery kiln dated to about 1720. It is the oldest intact pottery kiln known in Pennsylvania.

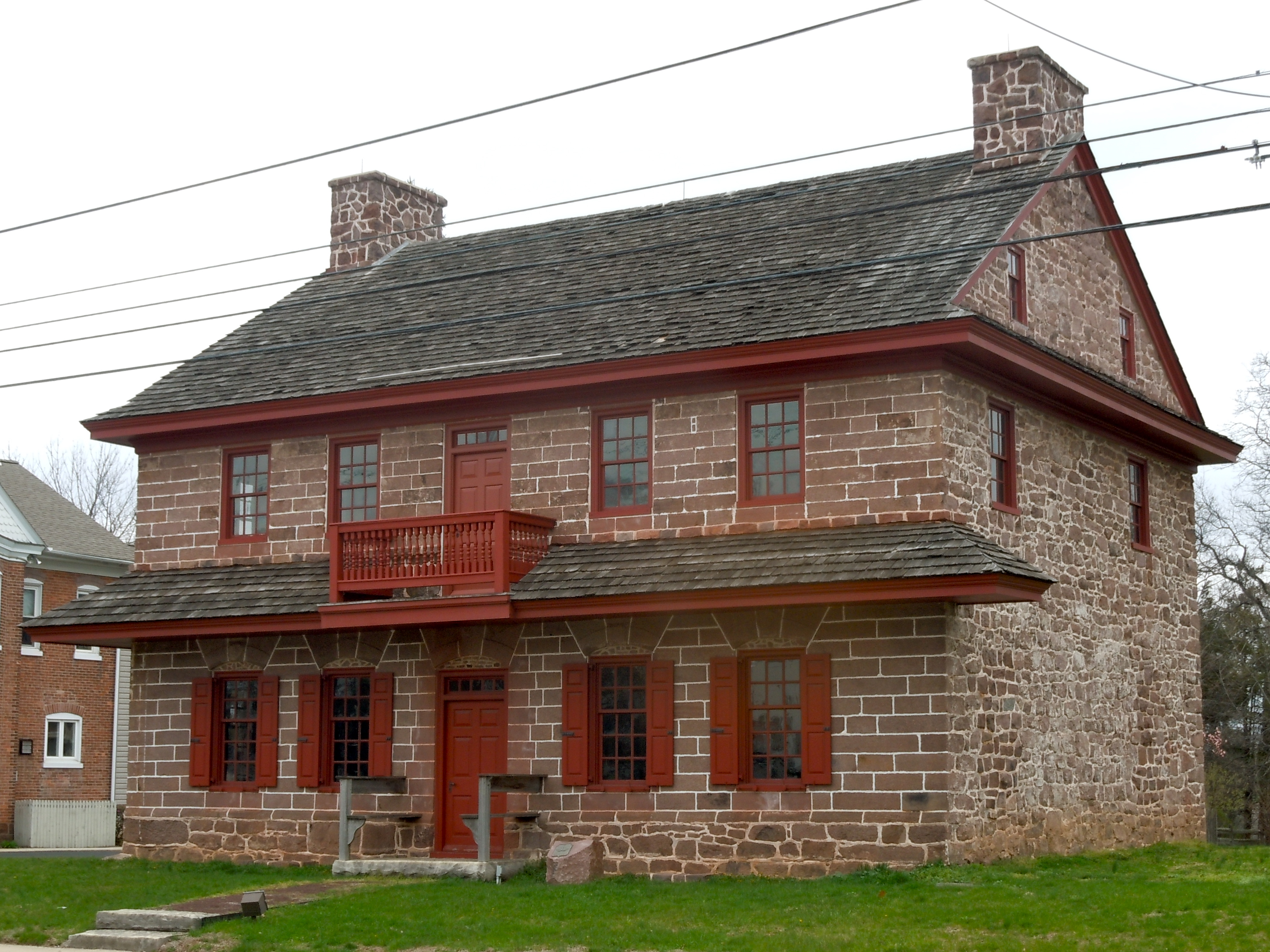
Henry Melchior Muhlenberg House in Trappe

Throughout his career he wrote for numerous publications about military or American German history. Richards would go on to publish many on historical books about events and families during the American Revolutionary War. In 1910, Richards received the honorary degree of Literary Doctor from Muhlenberg College in recognition of his published works and historic subjects. Richards was appointed the Director of Pennsylvania's Council of National Defense and authorized to join the Four Minute Men during World War 1 and later city treasurer of Lebanon, in which he served from 1918 to 1920. Richards would later be appointed to numerous positions without solicitation on his part. On December 26, 1871, Richards married Ella Van Leer who was a member of another well known Pennsylvania family. Richards was also president of the Pennsylvania German Society.

== Military ==
At the outbreak of the Civil War Richards joined the Union Army at in the 26th Pennsylvania Infantry Regiment in 1864. Richards participated throughout the entire Gettysburg campaign and in the battle of Gettysburg where he narrowly escaped capture. Later in 1864, he reenlisted under the 195th Regiment, Pennsylvania Volunteers, and served under General Sheridan. After graduating from the United States Naval Academy, he received his diploma with honors from the hands of Ulysses S. Grant and was attached to the USS Juniata (1862). During the Carlist Wars Richards ship was attacked at San Roque, Spain and nearly captured. During the voyage back to the United States, Juniata discovered the German schooner Avance in distress, with her crew sick. Five sailors were put aboard Avance and she was taken in to São Jorge Island, Cape Verde Islands. Richards also invented solutions for Earthing system fuses which were adopted by the military. During the Spanish–American War Richards served as director of naval service for the Lebanon County branch of the Pennsylvania Council of National Defense and Committee of Public Safety.

== See also ==
- Muhlenberg family

== Sources ==
- Thomas Lynch Montgomery, ed. (1916). Report of the Commission to Locate the Site of the Frontier Forts of Pennsylvania. W.S. Ray, state printer.
