= Francis Swaine Muhlenberg =

American politician

Member of the U.S. House of Representatives from Ohio's 6th district
- In office December 19, 1828 – March 3, 1829
- Preceded by: William Creighton, Jr.
- Succeeded by: William Creighton, Jr.

Member of the Ohio House of Representatives from Pickaway County
- In office December 3, 1827 – November 30, 1828
- Preceded by: Guy W. Doan; Jacob Linsey
- Succeeded by: Val Keffer

Personal details
- Born: April 22, 1795 Philadelphia, Pennsylvania, US
- Died: December 17, 1831 (aged 36) Pickaway County, Ohio, US
- Party: Adams
- Education: Dickinson College

Francis Swaine Muhlenberg (April 22, 1795 – December 17, 1831) was a political leader, member of the United States House of Representatives from Ohio, and a member of the Muhlenberg Family political dynasty.

== Formative years ==
Francis Swaine Muhlenberg was born in Philadelphia, Pennsylvania. His father, John Peter Gabriel Muhlenberg, was an American Revolutionary War hero and member of the United States Congress. His uncle, Frederick Augustus Conrad Muhlenberg, was the first Speaker of the United States House of Representatives.

Muhlenberg attended Dickinson College in Carlisle, Pennsylvania, studied law, and was admitted to the Pennsylvania bar in 1816.

== Career and marriage ==
From 1820 to 1823, Muhlenberg served as private secretary to Pennsylvania Governor Joseph Hiester.

He moved west to Pickaway County, Ohio, and was elected to the Ohio House of Representatives in 1827. Sometime during this phase of his life, according to The Cincinnati Enquirer, he married Mary Barr Denny, after settling near her home in Circleville, Ohio, on lands granted to his father, General Peter Muhlenberg, for services in the Revolutionary War."

In 1828, he was elected the U.S. House of Representatives to fill the congressional seat vacated by the resignation of William Creighton, Jr. in the Twentieth United States Congress. He served until March 3, 1829.

After his congressional career, Muhlenberg worked as a businessman and land speculator in Ohio and Kentucky.

== Death and interment ==
Muhlenberg died in Pickaway County, Ohio on December 17, 1831, and was interred at the Protestant Cemetery in Circleville.

== Legacy ==
Muhlenberg Township, Pickaway County, Ohio, was named after him.

U.S. House of Representatives
Preceded by William Creighton, Jr.	Member of the U.S. House of Representatives from Ohio's 6th congressional district 1828–1829	Succeeded by William Creighton, Jr.
Ohio House of Representatives
Preceded by Guy W. Doan; Jacob Linsey	Representative from Pickaway County; December 3, 1827-November 30, 1828; Served alongside: Val Keffer	Succeeded by Val Keffer
