= Henry A. P. Muhlenberg =

American politician (1782–1844)

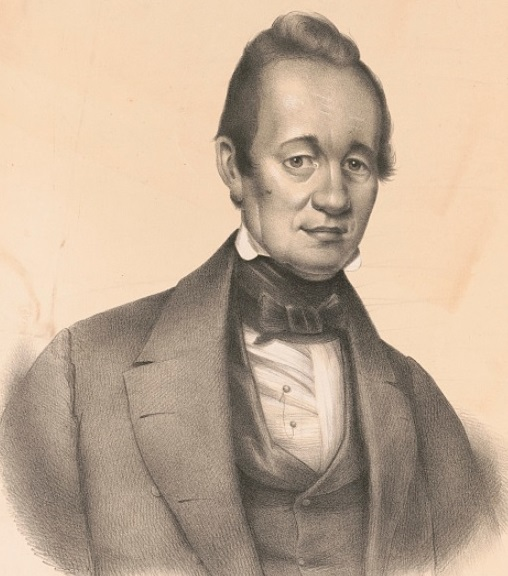

1st United States Minister to the Austrian Empire
- In office February 8, 1838 – September 18, 1840
- President: Martin Van Buren
- Preceded by: Office created
- Succeeded by: Daniel Jenifer

Member of the U.S. House of Representatives from Pennsylvania
- In office March 4, 1829 – February 8, 1838
- Preceded by: William Addams (7th); Multi-member district (9th)
- Succeeded by: David D. Wagener (7th); George M. Keim (9th)
- Constituency: 7th district (1829–33); 9th district (1833–38)

Personal details
- Born: Henry Augustus Philip Muhlenberg; May 13, 1782 Lancaster, Pennsylvania, British America
- Died: August 11, 1844 (aged 62) Reading, Pennsylvania, U.S.
- Resting place: Charles Evans Cemetery
- Party: Jacksonian Democrat; Democrat
- Spouse(s): Mary Elizabeth (m. 1805, d. 1806); Rebecca Hiester (m. 1808)
- Relations: Frederick Muhlenberg (uncle); Peter Muhlenberg (uncle); Henry Augustus Muhlenberg III (grandson); Joseph Hiester (father-in-law)
- Children: 6, including Henry Augustus Muhlenberg
- Parent(s): Gotthilf Henry Ernest Muhlenberg; Mary Catherine Hall Muhlenberg
- Occupation: Minister; politician

Henry Augustus Philip Muhlenberg (May 13, 1782 – August 11, 1844) was an American political leader and diplomat. He was a member of the Muhlenberg family political dynasty.

== Early life ==
Henry Augustus Philip Muhlenberg was born in Lancaster, Pennsylvania, on May 13, 1782. Henry was the son of Mary Catherine (née Hall) Muhlenberg and Gotthilf Henry Ernest Muhlenberg, a prominent clergyman and botanist.

His paternal grandfather was Henry Muhlenberg, a German born Lutheran pastor who was sent to North America as a missionary. His paternal grandmother, Anna Maria (née Weiser) Muhlenberg was the daughter of Colonial leader, Conrad Weiser. Among Henry's uncles were Revolutionary War leaders, Frederick Muhlenberg, later the 1st Speaker of the U.S. House of Representatives, and Peter Muhlenberg, who served as the 8th Vice-President of Pennsylvania under Benjamin Franklin before his election as a U.S. Representative and U.S. Senator from Pennsylvania.

== Career ==
Muhlenberg studied theology and was ordained a Lutheran minister in 1802. He served as pastor of Trinity Lutheran Church in Reading, Pennsylvania, from April 1803 to June 1829.

He was elected a member of the American Antiquarian Society in 1814.

=== Political career ===
In 1828, Muhlenberg was elected to the United States House of Representatives to serve in the 21st United States Congress as a Jacksonian Democrat. He was reelected, as a Jacksonian, to the 22nd through 24th United States Congresses. On December 9, 1834, he wrote to John M. Read, later the Attorney General of Pennsylvania, about James Buchanan's election to the United States Senate, stating: "I rejoice in the election of our friend Buchanan" and that "he will be an honor to the State and of much service to our friends."

Muhlenberg was again reelected to the 25th Congress, this time as a Democrat, and served from March 4, 1829, until his resignation on February 9, 1838, when he was appointed the first United States Minister to the Austrian Empire on February 8, 1838. He presented his credentials in Vienna on November 7, 1838, and served until September 18, 1840, when he left his post and was succeeded by Daniel Jenifer.

He ran unsuccessfully for Governor of Pennsylvania twice in 1835 and 1838. He was nominated by the Democratic Party a third time in 1844, but died before the election took place.

== Personal life ==
Muhlenberg was twice married. His first marriage was in 1805 to Mary Elizabeth Muhlenberg (1784–1806). Mary died on March 21, 1806, giving birth to a daughter:

- Mary Elizabeth Muhlenberg (1806–1838), who married the Rev. Ehrgott Jonathan Deininger (1801–1881).

After her death, he remarried to Rebecca Hiester (1781–1841) on June 7, 1808. Rebecca was the daughter of Elizabeth (née Witman) Hiester and Joseph Hiester, the 5th governor of Pennsylvania. Together, they were the parents of:

- Emma Elizabeth Muhlenberg, who died in infancy.
- Hiester Henry Muhlenberg (1812–1886), who married Amelia Howard (1817–1852). After her death, he married Katharine Spang Hunter (1835–1913).
- Emma Elizabeth Muhlenberg (1817–1833), who died unmarried.
- Rosa Catharine Muhlenberg (1821–1867), who married Gustavus Anthony Nicolls (1817–1886).
- Henry Augustus Muhlenberg (1823–1854), who was elected to Congress and married his cousin, Ann Hall Muhlenberg.

Muhlenberg died in Reading, Pennsylvania, on August 11, 1844, and is interred at the Charles Evans Cemetery.

=== Descendants ===
Through his son Henry, he was the grandfather of Henry Augustus Muhlenberg III, who unsuccessfully ran for Congress in 1892.

Party political offices
Preceded by George Wolf	Democratic nominee for Governor of Pennsylvania; 1835	Succeeded by David R. Porter
U.S. House of Representatives
Preceded by William Addams; Joseph Fry, Jr.	Member of the U.S. House of Representatives from Pennsylvania's 7th congressional district 1829–1833; 1829–1831 alongside: Joseph Fry, Jr.	Succeeded by David D. Wagener
Preceded by James Ford; Philander Stephens; Lewis Dewart	Member of the U.S. House of Representatives from Pennsylvania's 9th congressional district 1833–1838	Succeeded by George M. Keim
Diplomatic posts
New title	U.S. Minister to the Austrian Empire; 1838–1840	Succeeded by Daniel Jenifer
