= Frederick Augustus Muhlenberg (educator) =

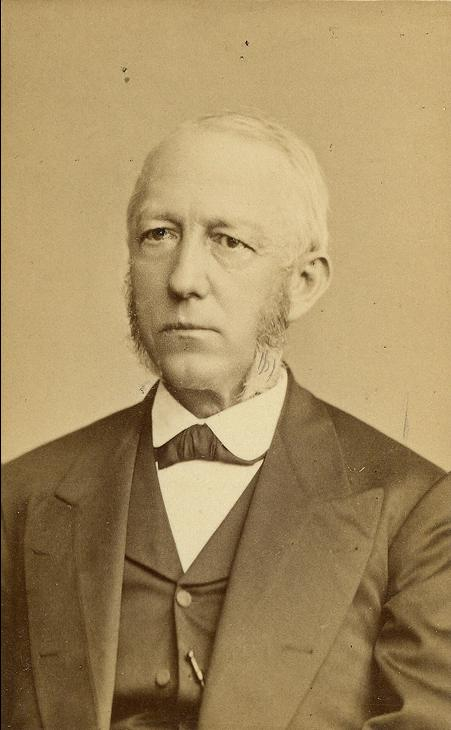
- Frederick Augustus Muhlenberg
- Born: August 25, 1818; Lancaster, Pennsylvania, U.S.
- Died: March 21, 1901 (aged 82); Reading, Pennsylvania, U.S.
- Occupation: Professor at the University of Pennsylvania
- Known for: President of Muhlenberg College

Frederick Augustus Muhlenberg (1818–1901) was an American educator and Lutheran clergyman who served as president of Muhlenberg College in Allentown, Pennsylvania, and as a Greek language and literature professor at the University of Pennsylvania in Philadelphia.

== Early life and education ==
Muhlenberg was born in Lancaster, Pennsylvania in 1818, to German Americans Frederick Augustus Hall Muhlenberg (1795–1867) and his wife Elizabeth Schaum in Lancaster, Pennsylvania, on August 25, 1818. Frederick A. Hall Muhlenberg was the son of Gotthilf Henry Ernst Muhlenberg a noted botanist. Muhlenberg was born at Lancaster, Pennsylvania, where his father was a physician and a trustee of Franklin College. F. A. H. Muhlenberg had received his M.D. from the University of Pennsylvania where Benjamin Rush had been among his teachers.

In 1848, Muhlenberg married Catherine Anne Muhlenberg. She was a granddaughter of Gotthilf Muhlenberg's brother Peter Muhlenberg, and thus a second-cousin of Frederick. They were the parents of six sons.

Muhlenberg began his education at Pennsylvania College (now Gettysburg College) and then transferred to Jefferson College (now Washington and Jefferson College) from which he graduated in 1836. He then studies at Princeton Theological Seminary.

== Career ==
In 1840, Muhlenberg joined the faculty of Franklin College, now Franklin & Marshall College.

In 1850, Muhlenberg joined the faculty of Pennsylvania College, where he taught Greek and served as college Librarian. In 1854, he was ordained a Lutheran minister, and actively served as such in various Lutheran Churches in and around Gettysburg. He remained at Pennsylvania College until 1867.

From 1867 to 1876, Muhlenberg served as president of Muhlenberg College. In 1876, Muhlenberg was appointed a professor of Greek at the University of Pennsylvania, where he remained until 1888.

He was elected as a member to the American Philosophical Society in 1878.

In 1891, Muhlenberg became the president of Thiel College. In 1893, a stroke forced him to resign that position. He lived in Reading, Pennsylvania, from 1893 until his death on March 21, 1901.
