= Henry Augustus Muhlenberg (1823–1854) =

American politician (1823–1854)

Henry Augustus Muhlenberg (July 21, 1823 – January 9, 1854) was an American politician and Democratic congressman representing the state of Pennsylvania.

== Early years ==
Muhlenberg was a member of the Muhlenberg family political dynasty. He was born in Reading, Pennsylvania, on July 21, 1823. His father, Henry A. P. Muhlenberg, was a congressman and U.S. minister to Austria; his grandfather, Joseph Hiester, was the governor of Pennsylvania.

== Career ==
Muhlenberg attended Dickinson College in Carlisle, Pennsylvania. He studied law and was admitted to the bar in 1844, practicing law in Reading, Pennsylvania. He was elected to the Pennsylvania State Senate in 1849, serving until 1852 when he was elected to the United States House of Representatives to represent the 8th Congressional district. He began Congressional service on March 4, 1853, and died less than a year later.

== Death ==
Muhlenberg died in Washington, D.C., on January 9, 1854, while in office. He was buried in the Charles Evans Cemetery in Reading.

His son, Henry Augustus Muhlenberg, III unsuccessfully ran for Congress in 1892.

== See also ==
- List of members of the United States Congress who died in office (1790–1899)

U.S. House of Representatives
Preceded by Thaddeus Stevens	Member of the U.S. House of Representatives from Pennsylvania's 8th congressional district 1853-1854	Succeeded by Jehu Glancy Jones
