= Gotthilf Heinrich Ernst Muhlenberg =

United States botanist and Lutheran clergyman (1753-1815)

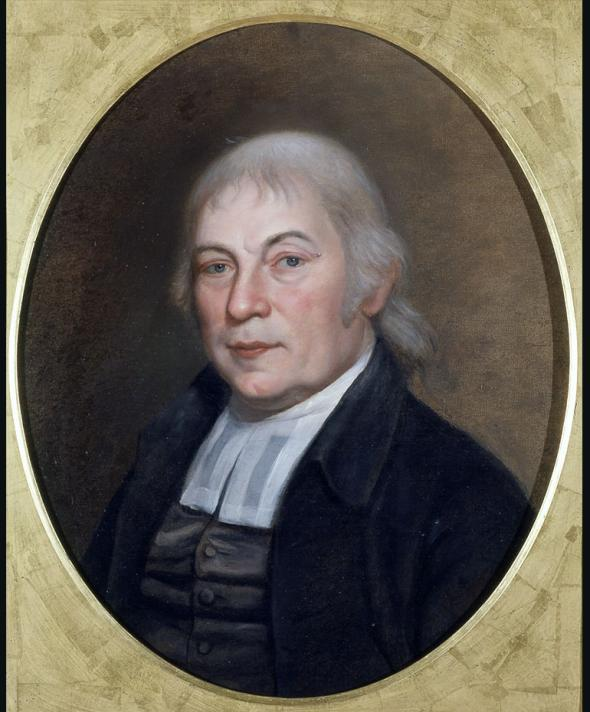

1st President of Franklin College
- In office 1787 - 1815
- Succeeded by: Board of Trustees

Personal details
- Born: November 17, 1753 Trappe, Pennsylvania
- Died: May 23, 1815 (aged 61) Lancaster, Pennsylvania
- Children: Henry A. P. Muhlenberg
- Education: University of Halle; Princeton University (DD)

Academic work
- Institutions: Princeton University; Franklin College
- Notable works: Index Flora Lancastriensis (1791); Catalogus Plantarum Americae Septentrionalis (1813)

Gotthilf Heinrich Ernst Muhlenberg (November 17, 1753 – May 23, 1815) was an American clergyman, botanist, and first president of Franklin College.

== Biography ==
=== Early life ===
The son of Heinrich Melchior Muhlenberg, he was born in Trappe, Pennsylvania. He was educated at Franckesche Stiftungen in Halle starting in 1763 and in 1769 at the University of Halle. He returned to Pennsylvania in September 1770 and was ordained as a Lutheran minister. He served first in Pennsylvania and then as a pastor in New Jersey. He received a Doctor of Divinity degree from Princeton University.

=== American Revolution ===
He married Mary Catherine Hall in 1774, with whom he would go on to have eight children. Despite his family beginning to take root in Philadelphia, Muhlenberg found he had no choice but to flee Philadelphia upon the outbreak of Revolutionary War hostilities in the region. Returning to his hometown of Trappe, he took up the study of botany.

== Career ==
He served as the pastor of Holy Trinity Church in Lancaster, Pennsylvania from 1780 through 1815. In 1785, he was elected as a member to the American Philosophical Society. In 1787, he was also made the first president of Franklin College. In 1779 he retired and devoted himself to the study of botany. He is best known as a botanist. Muhlenbergia, a well-known genus of grasses, was named in his honor. His chief works are Catalogus Plantarum Americae Septentrionalis (1813) and Descriptio Uberior Graminum et Plantarum Calamariarum Americae Septentrionalis Indiginarum et Cicurum (1817).

Muhlenberg discovered and identified the bog turtle while conducting a survey of plants in Lancaster County, Pennsylvania. In 1801 the turtle was named Clemmys muhlenbergii in his honor, (with a common name of Muhlenberg's tortoise). However, the species' common name was changed to bog turtle in 1956, as the practice of naming an organism's common name after individuals became less popular. Despite this, Quercus muehlenbergii, a species of oak tree that is native to much of the eastern and central US, was named in his honor and retains the name today.

In 1815, he suffered a paralytic stroke which hindered his activities. Helped by his daughter, however, Muhlenberg continued his correspondences until the sudden recess of his paralysis. Despite his condition seemingly reversing itself, a final series of strokes took his life not long after.

Muhlenberg is buried in Woodward Hill Cemetery in Lancaster, Pennsylvania.

== Family ==
Muhlenberg was the brother of Frederick and Peter Muhlenberg, father of Henry A. P. Muhlenberg and Frederick Augustus Hall Muhlenberg, a physician, who was the father of Frederick Augustus Muhlenberg, the first president of Muhlenberg College.
