= Muhlenberg School District =

School district in Pennsylvania

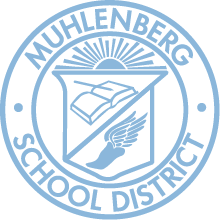

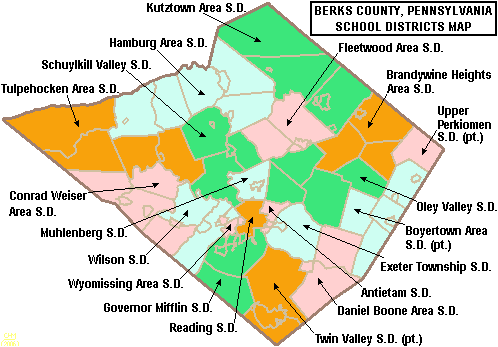

Address
- 801 Bellevue Avenue, Reading, Pennsylvania Berks County, Pennsylvania; United States
- Coordinates: 40.38852°N 75.92353°W

District information
- Type: Public
- Superintendent: Dr. Joseph Macharola
- School board: Board of Education of the Muhlenberg School District
- Enrollment: K-12

Other information
- Website: www.muhlsdk12.org

The Muhlenberg Area School District is a mid-sized, suburban, public school district serving parts of Berks County, Pennsylvania. It encompasses the borough of Laureldale and the Muhlenberg Township. The district encompasses approximately 13 square miles (34 km^{2}). Per the 2000 federal census data it served a resident population of 20,064. By 2010, the district's population declined to 23,562 people.

In 2009, the district residents’ per capita income was $21,417, while the median family income was $51,356. In the Commonwealth, the median family income was $49,501 and the United States median family income was $49,445, in 2010.

The district operates four schools: Muhlenberg Elementary Center (K-3), C.E. Cole Intermediate School (4–6), Muhlenberg Middle School (7–9), and Muhlenberg High School (10–12) school. The 9th grade moved from the high school to the middle school in the 2010–2011 school year. The 4th grade moved from the elementary school to the intermediate school in the 2018–2019 school year. All four of the schools share the same campus and are separated by athletic fields. The district is one of the 500 public school districts of Pennsylvania.

High school students may choose to attend Reading Muhlenberg Career and Technology Centers for training in the trades. The Berks County Intermediate Unit IU14 provides the district with a wide variety of services like specialized education for disabled students and hearing, speech and visual disability services and professional development for staff and faculty.

== Extracurriculars ==
Muhlenberg School District offers a variety of clubs, activities and an extensive sports program.

=== Sports ===
The district funds:

Boys

- Baseball - AAAA
- Basketball- AAAA
- Bowling - AAAA
- Cross Country - AAA
- Football - AAA
- Golf - AAAA
- Soccer - AAA
- Swimming and Diving - AAA
- Tennis - AAA
- Track and Field - AAA
- Water Polo - AAAA
- Wrestling - AAA

Girls

- Basketball - AAAA
- Bowling - AAAA
- Cheerleading
- Cross Country - AAA
- Field hockey - AAA
- Golf - AAA
- Soccer (Fall) - AAA
- Softball - AAA
- Swimming and Diving - AAA
- Girls' Tennis -AAA
- Track and Field - AAA
- Volleyball - AAA
- Water Polo - AAAA

Middle School Sports

Boys

- Baseball
- Basketball
- Cross Country
- Football
- Soccer
- Track and Field
- Wrestling

Girls

- Basketball
- Cross Country
- Field Hockey
- Softball
- Track and Field
- Volleyball
