= Frederick Augustus Muhlenberg =

American architect

Frederick Augustus Muhlenberg II
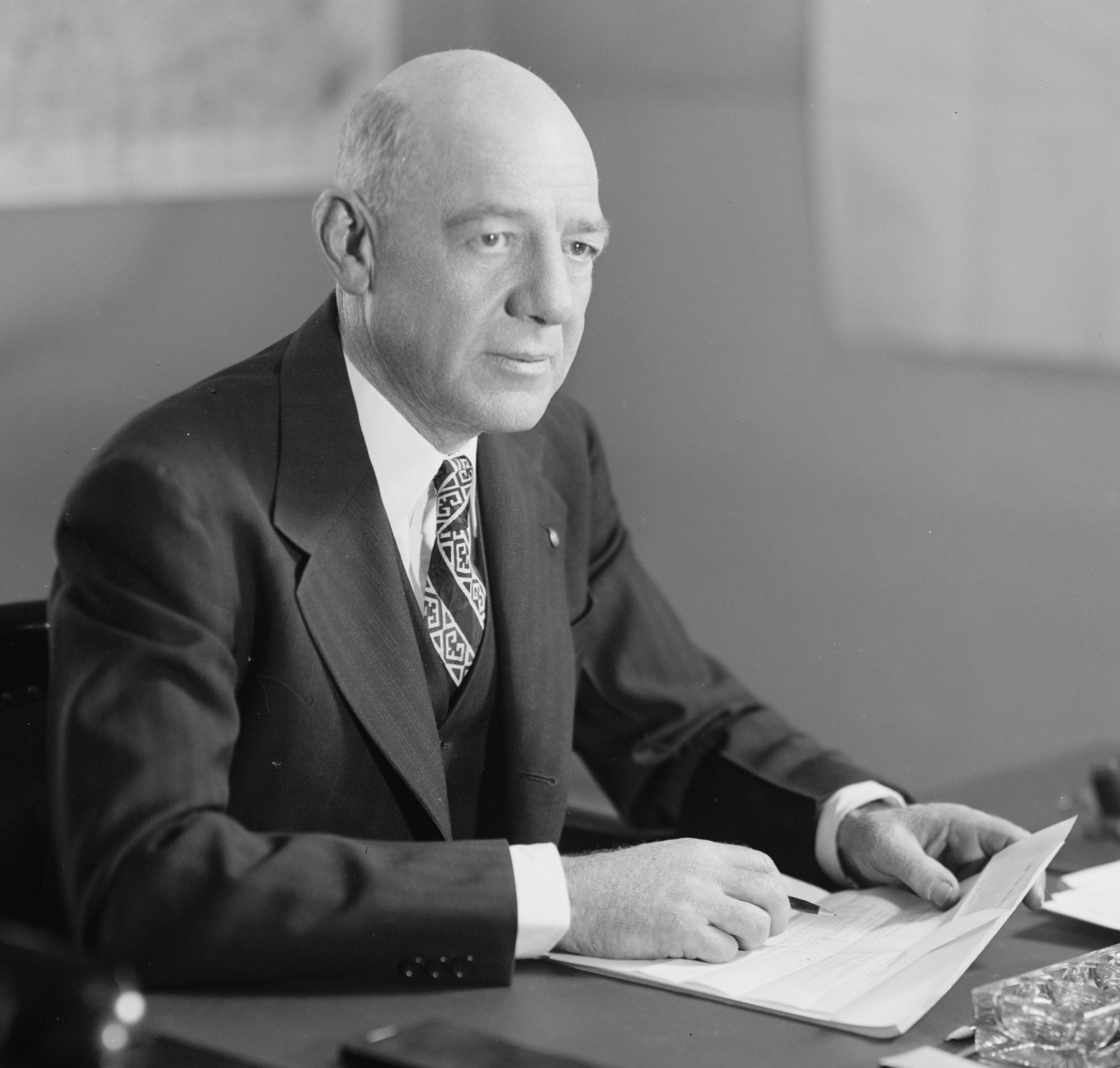

Member of the U.S. House of Representatives from Pennsylvania
- In office January 3, 1947 – January 3, 1949
- Preceded by: Daniel K. Hoch
- Succeeded by: George M. Rhodes

Personal details
- Born: September 25, 1887 Reading, Pennsylvania, U.S.
- Died: January 19, 1980 (aged 92) Reading, Pennsylvania, U.S.
- Resting place: Arlington National Cemetery
- Party: Republican
- Spouse: Elizabeth S. (Young) Muhlenberg
- Relations: Muhlenberg family
- Children: Caroline M. (Muhlenberg) Hufford; Frederica M. (Muhlenberg) Bunge; John D.S. Muhlenberg; Elizabeth Muhlenberg
- Parent(s): Dr. William Frederick Muhlenberg and Henrietta Augusta (Muhlenberg) Muhlenberg
- Education: Reading Boys' High School, 1904
- Alma mater: Gettysburg College; University of Pennsylvania
- Occupation: Architect

Frederick Augustus Muhlenberg II FAIA (September 25, 1887 – January 19, 1980) was a leading architect, an American military and political leader who served as a U.S. congressman from Pennsylvania, and a member of the Muhlenberg political dynasty.

== Early life and education ==
Muhlenberg was born in Reading, Pennsylvania, in Berks County on September 25, 1887. He was the son of Dr. William Frederick and Henrietta Augusta (Muhlenberg) Muhlenberg, a grandson of Frederick Augustus Conrad Muhlenberg, and a great-great-grandson of Rev. John Peter Gabriel Muhlenberg.

A 1904 graduate of Reading Boys' High School, Muhlenberg attended Gettysburg College in Gettysburg, Pennsylvania, earning a Bachelor of Arts in 1908. Muhlenberg earned his Bachelor of Science in Architecture from the University of Pennsylvania in Philadelphia in 1912, followed by his Master of Science from Gettysburg College in 1915, while serving as an officer of the T-Square Club. He received an honorary Doctor of Science degree in 1942 from Muhlenberg College of Allentown.

== Military service ==
During World War I, he was a captain in the 314th Infantry Regiment serving from September 1917 to March 1919. He was awarded the Distinguished Service Cross, the Purple Heart, the Legion of Merit, the Verdun Medal, the Légion d’Honneur and the Croix de Guerre with Palm for his actions in World War I.

Muhlenberg served continuously in the regular army reserves for more than 20 years. He re-entered the United States Army in 1940, where he served during World War II as a lieutenant colonel and colonel in the United States Army Corps of Engineers, as an aide to Gen. Brehon Summervell, and as district engineer in Cincinnati.

== Architecture ==
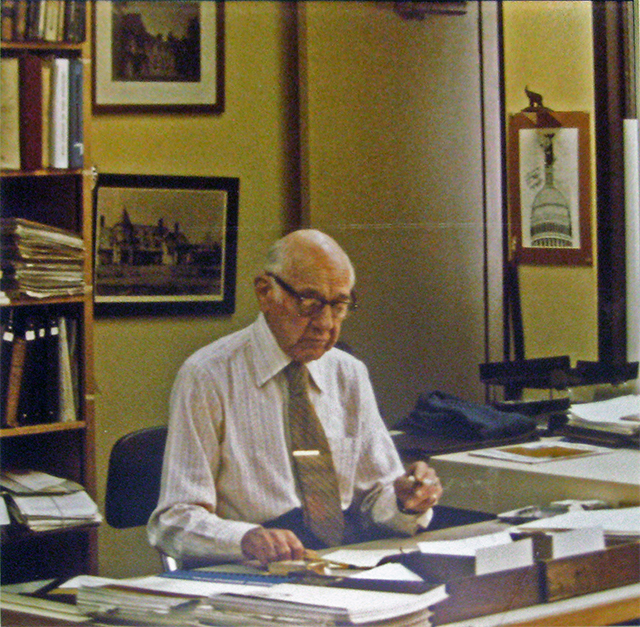
Muhlenberg at his desk at Muhlenberg Greene Architects, 1974

As an architect, Muhlenberg apprenticed with Charles Barton Keen, Magaziner & Potter, and John T. Windrim in Philadelphia. In 1917 he began operating independently, and on May 1, 1919, following his service in World War I, he announced a reopening of his Philadelphia office. In 1920, Muhlenberg joined the Philadelphia Chapter of the American Institute of Architects (AIA), and opened an office of Frederick A. Muhlenberg, Architect, in Reading. He is listed in the Philadelphia city directories as an architect in 1921, 1922 and 1923, with his residential address given as Reading. By the mid-1920s, the practice, now located exclusively in Reading, was thriving. The firm continued through several reorganizations to its present form as Muhlenberg Greene Architects.

During the intervening years, to accommodate the reorganizations, the firm operated for various periods under the following names (dates, in some cases, are approximate):

- Frederick A. Muhlenberg, Architect, 1920–1930
- Muhlenberg & Muhlenberg, 1925–1935

(Partner was Frederick Hunter Muhlenberg II, previously of Muhlenberg Brothers)

- Muhlenberg, Yerkes, Muhlenberg, 1935–1954

(Partners were Simeon M. Yerkes and Charles Rick Muhlenberg)

- Muhlenberg and Yerkes, 1954–1959
- Frederick A. Muhlenberg & Associates, 1959–1965
- Muhlenberg-Greene-Veres, 1965–1972

(Partners were Lawrence A. Greene, Jr. and Elmer Veres)

- Muhlenberg Greene Architects, 1972–1980
- Muhlenberg Greene Architects, Ltd., 1980–present

In the 1950s, Muhlenberg was elected a Fellow of the American Institute of Architects.

== Politics ==
Muhlenberg served on the Reading City Council from 1932–1936, and he was a councilman for the Borough of Wernersville during the 1920s, where he returned to live in his later years. He became the Republican Party chairman for Berks County from 1935–1940.

In 1946, Muhlenberg was elected to the 80th Congress from Pennsylvania, defeating the 80-year old incumbent Democrat. The 13th District was ostensibly Democratic and one paper claimed Muhlenberg's victory was "the most glaring upset of the election." The Muhlenberg name helped; he became the seventh member of his family to be elected to the U.S. Congress, beginning with the first Speaker of the House of Representatives, though none had served since 1854. This Muhlenberg served in the House from January 3, 1947, until January 3, 1949; but he lost his re-election bid in 1948, defeated by Democrat George M. Rhodes. Muhlenberg was active in the House in opposing, as an architect, President Harry Truman's new balcony on the White House, but also in supporting appropriations to address cerebral palsy, having a daughter afflicted.

== Retirement ==
In a personal biography he furnished to the Reading Eagle, Muhlenberg listed the accomplishments of a "life built on service in four separate careers: architecture, military, social service and political."

Retiring officially from Muhlenberg Greene Architects in 1977, one week after his 90th birthday, Muhlenberg continued to go to the office daily, until physical limitations prevented him from doing so about a year later. "You can't actually retire," he said at the time. "There really isn't any such thing. I don't intend to sit on my fanny and do nothing. At 90 years old, you change and have physical limitations. The pace may slow down, but the ideas are still there."

Muhlenberg died at 92 years of age in Reading on January 19, 1980. As a veteran, he was buried in Arlington National Cemetery.

A collection of awards, military medals, paperwork and other items related to Representative Muhlenberg is held by the Historical Society of Berks County.

== Associations ==
Frederick Muhlenberg served as chairman for numerous civic and professional organizations, including the Association of Schuylkill River Municipalities, director of the American Red Cross Berks County Chapter (1929-), chairman of the Red Cross Disaster Relief Commission (1935), the State Board of Examiners of Architects, president of the Social Welfare League (1922–1935), Public Charities Association (1927-), and the State Art Commission (1952–1963). Most notably, he served at the Berks County Planning Commission, leading as chairman from the commission's founding in 1954 until 1972 when he retired. In addition, he was a member of the Salvation Army Advisory Board.

Muhlenberg served as commander of Gregg Post, American Legion, in 1924, and a member of General Hunter Liggett Post, No. 38, Veterans of Foreign Wars, and Reading Post, No. 10, Disabled American Veterans.

== Awards ==
Listed in Who's Who in America, Muhlenberg received scores of educational, civilian, military and social service awards, including:

- Man of the Year, Reading Chamber of Commerce, 1960
- Community Service Award, Reading Chamber of Commerce, 1967
- Good Citizenship Award, Gen. George G. Meade Camp No. 16, Sons of Union Veterans of the Civil War, 1970
- Silver Bowl, Manufacturers Association of Berks County, in recognition of outstanding service to the community, 1972
- Man of the Year, Rotary Club of Reading, 1975

U.S. House of Representatives
Preceded by Daniel K. Hoch	Member of the U.S. House of Representatives from Pennsylvania's 13th congressional district 1947–1949	Succeeded by George M. Rhodes
