= Holy Trinity Lutheran Church (Lancaster, Pennsylvania) =

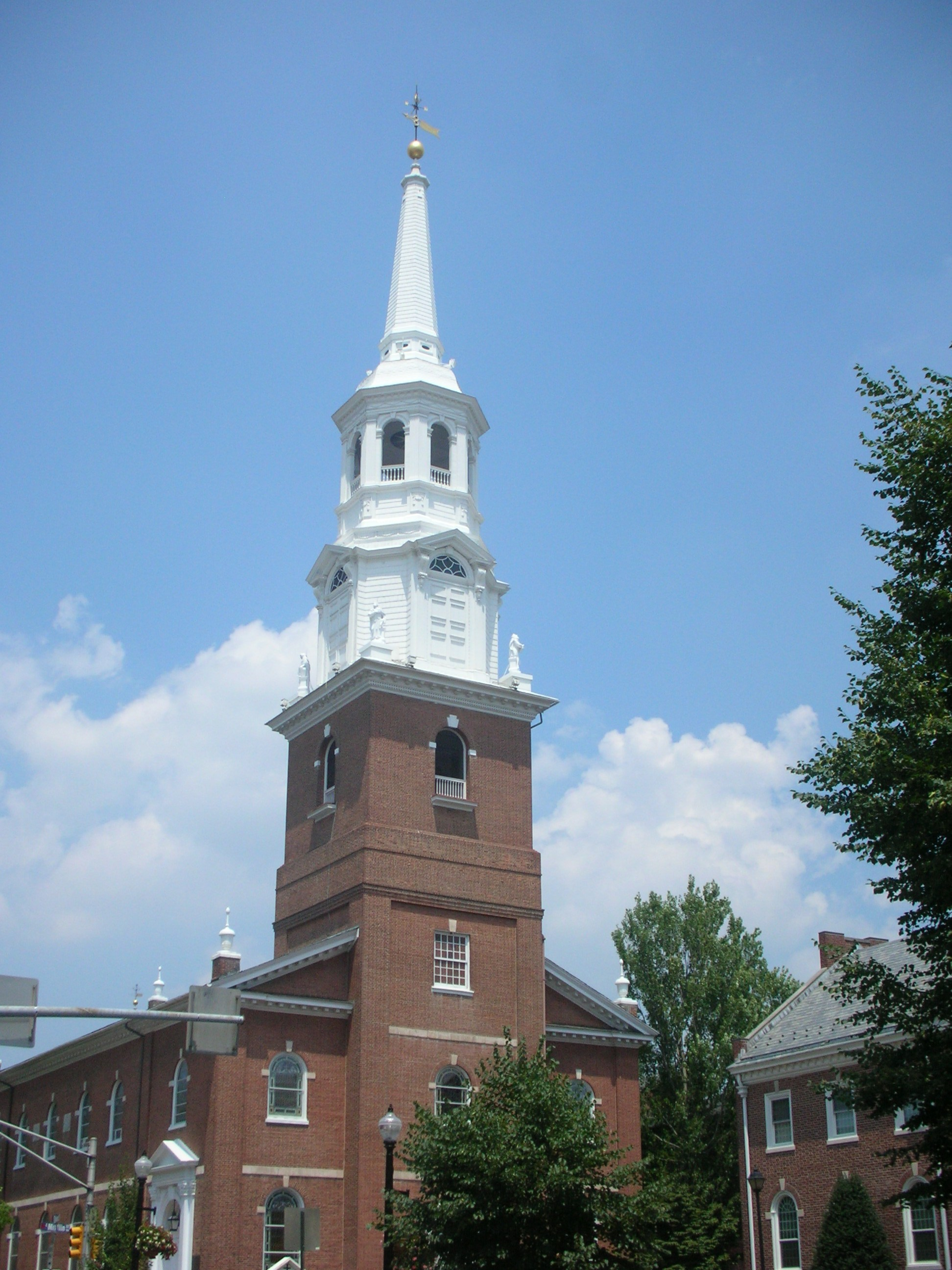

Religion
- Affiliation: Lutheran

Location
- Location: 31 South Duke Street, Lancaster, Pennsylvania
- Interactive map of Holy Trinity Lutheran Church
- Coordinates: 40°02′14″N 76°18′11″W

Architecture
- Completed: 1766
- Pennsylvania Historical Marker
- Designated: June 15, 1975

Holy Trinity Lutheran Church is an historic Lutheran church that is located at 31 South Duke Street in Lancaster, Pennsylvania, United States. It is one of the oldest churches in the commonwealth.

The remains of both Thomas Mifflin and Thomas Wharton were interred at the Holy Trinity Lutheran Church cemetery.

== History ==
The church congregation was formed in 1730. The current building was completed in 1766.

A Commonwealth of Pennsylvania historical marker at Trinity Church commemorates Thomas Wharton and Pennsylvania Governor Thomas Mifflin, the first and last Governors and Presidents of Pennsylvania under the 1776 State Constitution. The marker was dedicated in 1975 and is located on Duke Street in Lancaster. The text of the marker reads:

Holy Trinity
Lutheran Church
Founded in 1730.
A session for an Indian treaty was held in the original church building in 1762.
The present edifice was dedicated in 1766.
Here are interred the remains of Thomas Wharton (1778) and Gov. Thomas Mifflin (1800).

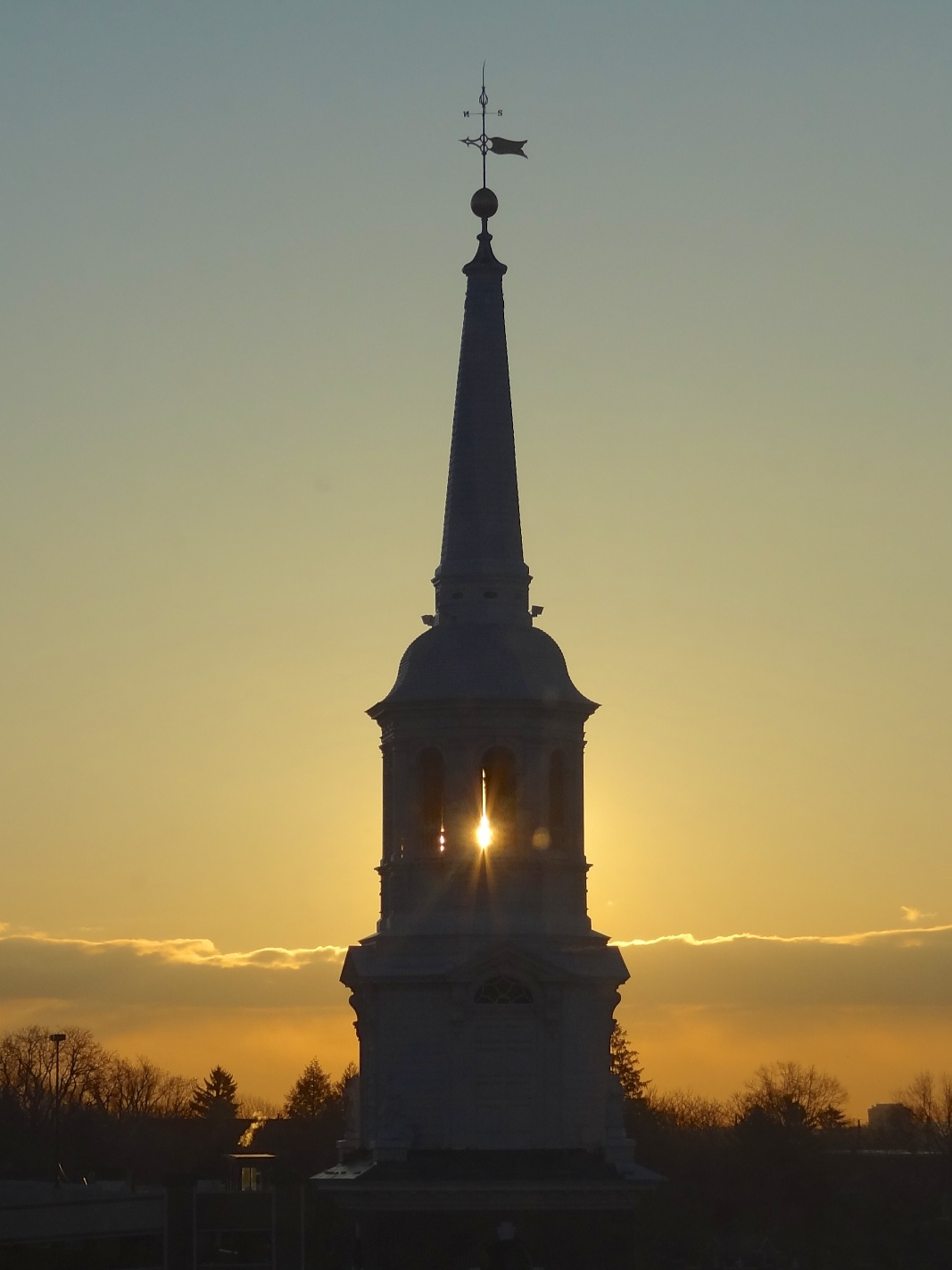
The church steeple at dawn
