= Henry Augustus Muhlenberg (1848–1906) =

American lawyer (1848–1906)

Henry Augustus Muhlenberg III (October 27, 1848 – May 14, 1906) was a prominent citizen of Reading, Pennsylvania and an unsuccessful candidate for the United States Congress with the Republican nomination in 1892.

Muhlenberg was born on October 27, 1848, in Reading, Pennsylvania, to Henry Augustus Muhlenberg and Annie H. Muhlenberg, who was a cousin of Henry Augustus on her father's side. His grandfather was Henry A. P. Muhlenberg, minister to Austria.

The young Muhlenberg studied with a tutor but later spent a year at Pennsylvania College, Gettysburg (now known as Gettysburg College). He then began studies at Harvard University in 1868. He graduated from Harvard with honors, receiving a degree in history in 1872. He studied law in the office of George F. Baer and was admitted to the bar of Berks County, Pennsylvania, in 1875. He was mainly involved in business law. He was a director in the Framers' National Bank, the Reading Trust Company, and the Mount Penn Gravity Railroad. He was also a director and treasurer of the Reading City Passenger Railway Company, which he help found. He was also a trustee of the Charles Evans Cemetery Company, a vestryman of Trinity Lutheran Church, and a member of the Valley Forge Park Commission, to which position he was appointed by two Governors of Pennsylvania. He was a staunch Republican.

In 1892 Muhlenberg was nominated for Congress on the Republican ticket, but lost in the general election.

Muhlenberg died of heart disease on May 14, 1906, at his home at 200 North 4th Street in Reading. He was buried in Charles Evans Cemetery.
