= List of mayors of Reading, Pennsylvania =

Political office in the United States

Mayor of Reading, Pennsylvania
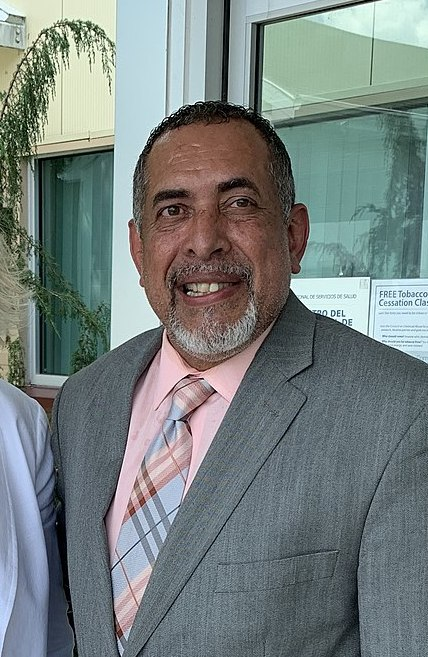
- Incumbent; Eddie Morán since January 6, 2020
- Formation: Peter Filbert

The Mayor of Reading, Pennsylvania, is the elected, chief executive of the city of Reading, Pennsylvania, the fourth-largest city in the state of Pennsylvania. The Reading city government consists of a mayor and a city council. The mayor is elected for a four-year term.

The Mayor of Reading served under a city commission form of government prior to 1996. However, the city's mayor have served under a home rule form of government since 1996, beginning with the inauguration of Mayor Paul Angstadt in January of that year.

Reading is one of the few United States cities to have elected a Socialist mayor. Three times, in 1927, 1935, and 1944, J. Henry Stump was elected mayor.

The current mayor is Eddie Moran, who was elected on November 5, 2019, and began serving his term on January 6, 2020.

== List ==
| Mayor | Term begins | Term ends | Political Party |
|---|---|---|---|
| Peter Filbert | 1847 | 1848 | |
| William H. Keim | 1848 | 1849 | Whig |
| George Getz | 1849 | 1853 | |
| George M. Keim | 1853 | 1853 | Democratic |
| Daniel R. Clymer | 1853 | 1854 | |
| John S. Richards | 1854 | 1855 | |
| William M. Baird | 1855 | 1856 | |
| Joel B. Wanner | 1856 | 1857 | |
| A. Jordan Swartz | 1857 | 1858 | |
| Benneville Keim | 1858 | 1861 | |
| Joel B. Wanner | 1861 | 1863 | |
| Joseph S. Hoyer | 1863 | 1865 | |
| Nathan M. Eisenhower | 1865 | 1867 | |
| William H. Gernand | 1867 | 1871 | |
| Samuel C. Mayer | 1871 | 1873 | |
| Charles F. Evans | 1873 | 1879 | |
| Henry A. Tyson | 1879 | 1881 | |
| William G. Rowe | 1881 | 1885 | |
| James K. Getz | 1885 | 1887 | |
| James R. Kenney | 1887 | 1891 | |
| Thomas P. Merritt | 1891 | 1893 | Democratic |
| William F. Shanaman | 1893 | 1896 | |
| Jacob Weidel | 1896 | 1899 | |
| Adam H. Leader | 1899 | 1902 | |
| Edward Yeager | 1902 | 1905 | |
| Edwin R. Gerber | 1905 | 1908 | |
| William Rick | 1908 | 1912 | |
| Ira W. Stratton | 1912 | 1916 | |
| Edward H. Filbert | 1916 | 1920 | |
| John K. Stauffer | 1920 | 1924 | |
| William E. Sharman | 1924 | 1928 | |
| J. Henry Stump | 1928 | 1932 | Socialist |
| Heber Ermentrout | 1932 | 1936 | Democratic - Republican fusion |
| J. Henry Stump | 1936 | 1940 | Socialist |
| Harry F. Menges | 1940 | 1944 | |
| J. Henry Stump | 1944 | 1948 | SDF |
| John F. Davis | 1948 | 1952 | Democratic |
| James B. Bamford | 1952 | 1956 | Republican |
| Daniel F. McDevitt | 1956 | 1960 | Democratic |
| John C. Kubacki | 1960 | 1964 | Democratic |
| Eugene Shirk | 1964 | 1968 | Republican |
| Victor Yarnell | 1968 | 1972 | Democratic |
| Eugene Shirk | 1972 | 1976 | Republican |
| Joseph P. Kuzminski | 1976 | 1980 | Democratic |
| Karen A. Miller | 1980 | February 1987 | Democratic |
| Warren Haggerty | February 1987 | January 1, 1996 | Democratic |
| Paul Angstadt | January 1, 1996 | January 3, 2000 | Republican |
| Joseph Eppihimer | January 3, 2000 | January 5, 2004 | Democratic |
| Tom McMahon | January 5, 2004 | January 2, 2012 | Democratic |
| Vaughn Spencer | January 2, 2012 | January 4, 2016 | Democratic |
| Wally Scott | January 4, 2016 | January 6, 2020 | Democratic |
| Eddie Morán | January 6, 2020 | | Democratic |
