= Charles Evans Cemetery =

Historic cemetery in Reading, Pennsylvania

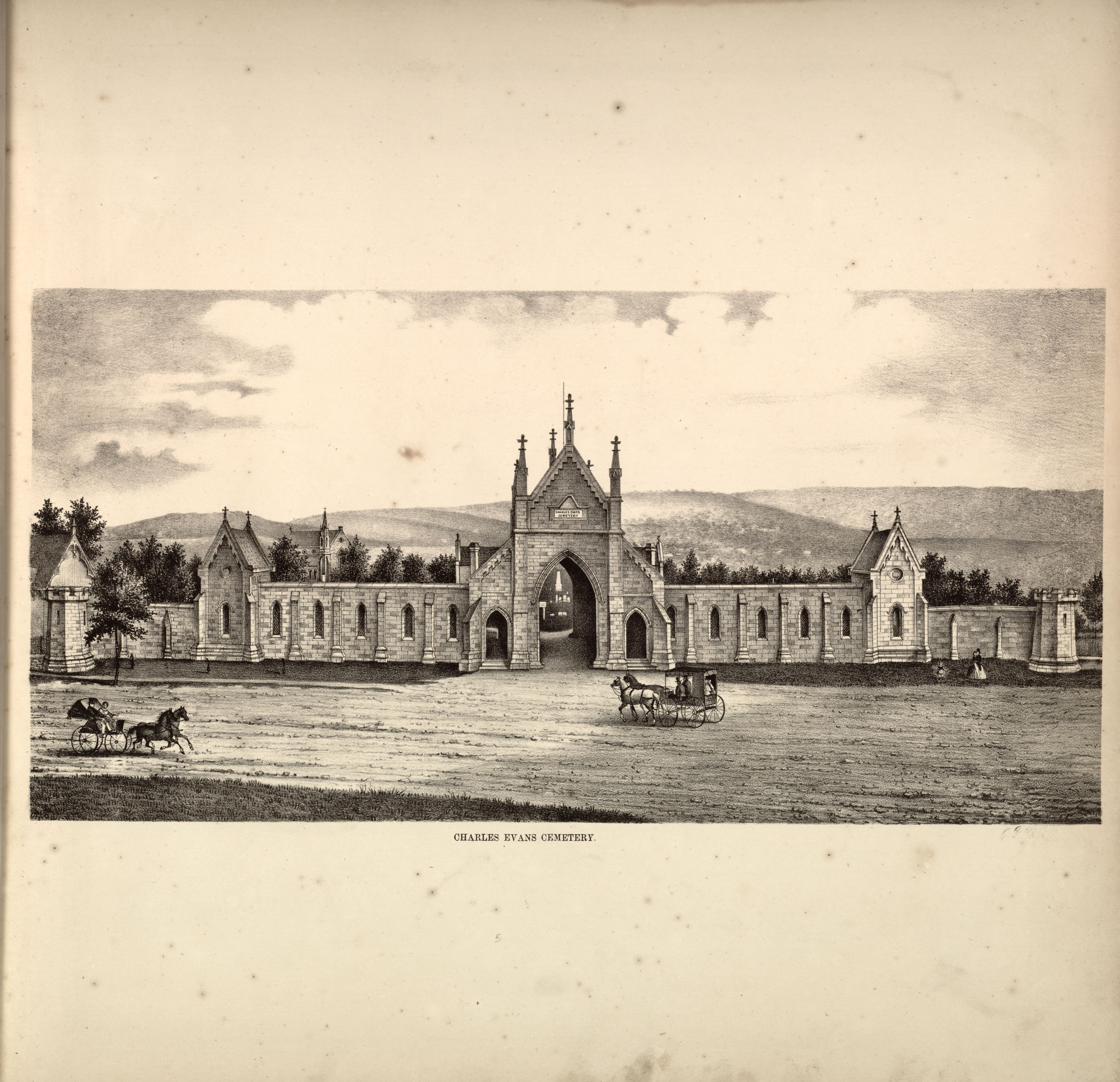
- Interactive map of Charles Evans Cemetery

Details
- Established: Incorporated March 28, 1846; endowed in 1847
- Location: 1119 Centre Avenue, Reading, Pennsylvania
- Country: United States
- Coordinates: 40°21′22″N 75°55′50″W
- No. of graves: Roughly 72,000
- Website: http://www.charlesevanscemetery.org/
- Find a Grave: Charles Evans Cemetery

Charles Evans Cemetery is a historic, nonsectarian, garden-style cemetery located in the city of Reading, Pennsylvania. It was founded by Charles Evans (1768-1847), a son of Quaker parents and native of Philadelphia who became a prominent attorney and philanthropist in Reading during the late 18th and early 19th centuries.

== Early history ==
After donating the cemetery's first twenty-five acres and $2,000 to support the early development and operations phase of this public burial ground, he then ensured the cemetery's long-term stability by bequeathing a roughly $67,000 endowment from his estate, following his death in 1847 to support beautification of the grounds and other perpetual care activities. Sited atop a hill, the cemetery was initially located outside of the city when Evans first donated the land, but was absorbed into Reading's boundaries as the city developed to meet the needs of its expanding population.

By the 1870s, cemetery administrators had expanded the grounds significantly, according to the Huntingdon Journal, which reported on the cemetery in its September 10, 1873 edition as follows:

The Charles Evans Cemetery, the beautiful "City of the Dead" of Reading contains one hundred acres of ground. The total number of interments within its precincts last year was 483; for the months of January, February, March, April, May, June, and July of this year the number was 267.

Roughly six thousand of the seventy-two thousand individuals interred since the cemetery's establishment have been veterans of the U.S. military, including two thousand men who served during the American Civil War.

== Administration ==
The original members of the cemetery's thirteen-member board of trustees were personally appointed by Charles Evans. They were: John Banks, John S. Hiester, Dr. Isaac Hiester, James L. Dunn, Samuel Bell, Dr. H. H. Muhlenberg, William Strong, Matthias S. Richards, William Darling, Dr. Diller Luther, William Eckert, Benneville Keim, and Peter Filbert. As those men resigned or died, they were succeeded by: Isaac Eckert, Adam Leize, James Milholland, James B. McKnight, G. A. Nicolls, William L. DeBorbon, Charles H. Hunter, J. Pringle Jones, Horatio Trexler, William M. Hiester, Augustus F. Boas, Warren J. Woodward, George D. Stitzel, Henry S. Eckert, John S. Pierson, Hiester Clymer, Henry M. Keim, Thomas D. Stichter, Daniel Ermentrout, Edwin F. Smith, and D. Gregg.

William Clemson was the first superintendent of the cemetery, and Thomas Gallagher was the first grave digger employed by the cemetery. Jacob Gnau was the cemetery's sexton at the time of Charles Evans' death in 1847. Following his death, Clemson was succeeded by Alexander Burnett, who was succeeded by John C. Hepler in 1880.

The first interment at the cemetery took place on May 21, 1847. Mrs. Harriet Norton, the mother of P & R Express Co. executive James L. Norton, was the individual buried that day.

Cemetery managers subsequently issued burial permits, beginning on January 1, 1848. Each permit from that date until through March 1886 was numbered with each year's series of permits "bounded and filed among the archives of the cemetery," according to The Reading Eagle. By the mid-1880s, it was estimated that roughly fifteen thousand burials had been made at the cemetery and at least $125,000 expended for the addition of trees and other ornamentation to the cemetery's grounds, as well as the purchase of additional land for future burials. Payments were made for these expenses by the cemetery's trust and through the sale of cemetery lots, which sold for twenty cents per square foot in the cemetery's oldest section in 1886 and thirty cents per square foot in the newest. The cemetery was also insured, and was "protected by law from taxation, and against the opening of streets through its grounds."

== Architecture ==
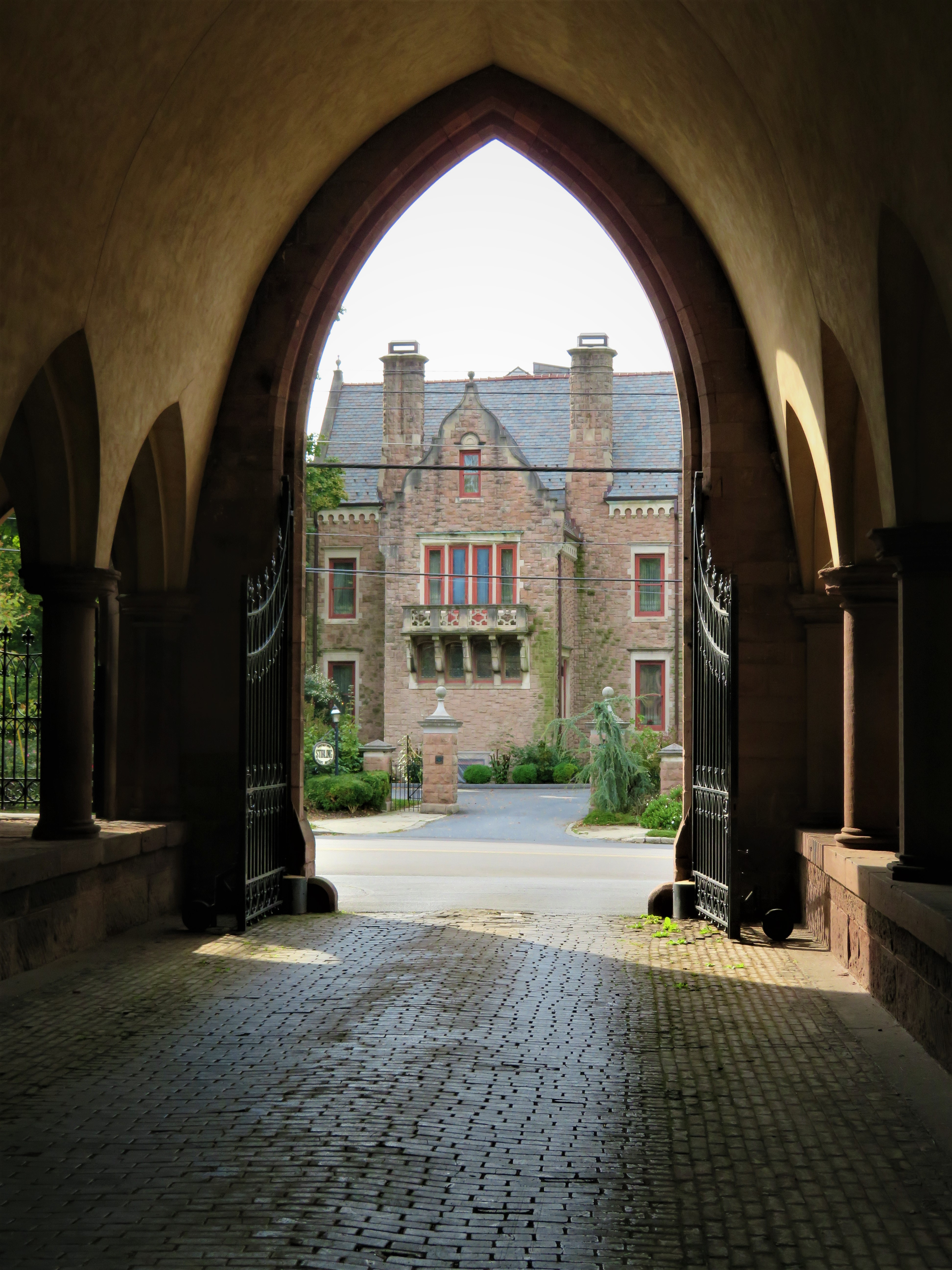
View from the cemetery's main gate toward the Stirling mansion, 2020

Visitors arriving via the main gate on Centre Avenue enter through a large, sandstone, Gothic Revival arch, which was erected in 1852, and pass by the grave of the cemetery's founder, Charles Evans, above-ground crypts, obelisks and other monuments to Civil War-era soldiers and other historical figures from Berks County.

In 1895, the cemetery's chapel served as the site for the funeral services of U.S. Supreme Court Justice William Strong (1808-1895). A Yale University law school graduate who became known for his anti-slavery views during the American Civil War, Strong had served in the U.S. House of Representatives from 1847 to 1851 and as a Justice of the Pennsylvania Supreme Court prior to his appointment to the U.S. Supreme Court by President Ulysses S. Grant in 1870, a tenure which included his service on the Electoral Commission tasked with resolving America's disputed presidential election of 1876. According to the August 22 Washington, D.C.'s Morning Times:

The body of ex-Justice William Strong arrived in Reading last night and was taken to the chapel in Charles Evans Cemetery. This morning a plaster mask was taken of the face of the deceased by U. S. J. Dunbar, of Washington. The funeral services, which, of brief character, were held in the chapel this afternoon in the presence of the family.... The ceremonies were exceedingly short, consisting of the reading of Scriptures, prayer by Rev. Dr. Teunis Hamlin, pastor of Covenant Presbyterian Church, Washington, D.C., and the Rev. George Heckman, of Olivet Presbyterian Church, this city. No remarks were made. The choir of Olivet Presbyterian Church sang "Lead, kindly light," and "Abide with Me," favorite hymns of the deceased.

In 1927, cemetery administrators opened a Tudor-style office building, followed by a columbarium in 1939. Built with separate chapel and crematorium sections and a bell tower, the columbarium facility is situated on the cemetery's east side near Perry Street. Designed in the Romanesque Italianate style, the artistry and craftsmanship of its windows and bronze door continue to be a subject of attention by photographers even today. On July 31, 1939, the Reading Times reported on this facility's opening as follows:

Charles Evans Cemetery's new crematorium, chapel and columbarium, opened yesterday for public inspection, attracted more than 500 persons. Inspection periods will continue daily from 1 to 5 p. m. The building, erected at the suggestion of the board of trustees, is now ready for use. The functions of the new crematory will be available to all people, regardless of race or - creed, and not restricted to residents of the Reading area. Now complete with landscaping, the building fits into the general pattern of the rest of the cemetery. The main entrance faces the Fifth street highway, and a circular driveway which passes the main doors links with the network lacing the cemetery. The building is designed in Romanesque Italian style and constructed of pink brick with Indiana limestone trimmings. Reinforced concrete was used for all structural parts. Divided into three general sections, which include the chapel, the higher central portion; the south wing, or crematory, and the north wing, or columbarium, the overall dimensions of the structure are 120 feet by 60 feet. The columbarium is divided into four small rooms and one large room, which - will be divided later as the need for expansion arises. Bronze crypts, for family and individual use, line the walls.

The Chapel Garden Museum and Hillside Mausoleum were added, respectively, in 1972 and 1981, and the crematorium's cremation chambers were updated in 1993. Over time, cemetery administrators also purchased additional land. As of 2018, those purchases had expanded the grounds to 119 acres, made accessible by seven miles of paved roads, and beautified by flowering shrubbery and more than 2,200 trees, many of which are old-growth and massive in size.

== Notable interments and monuments ==
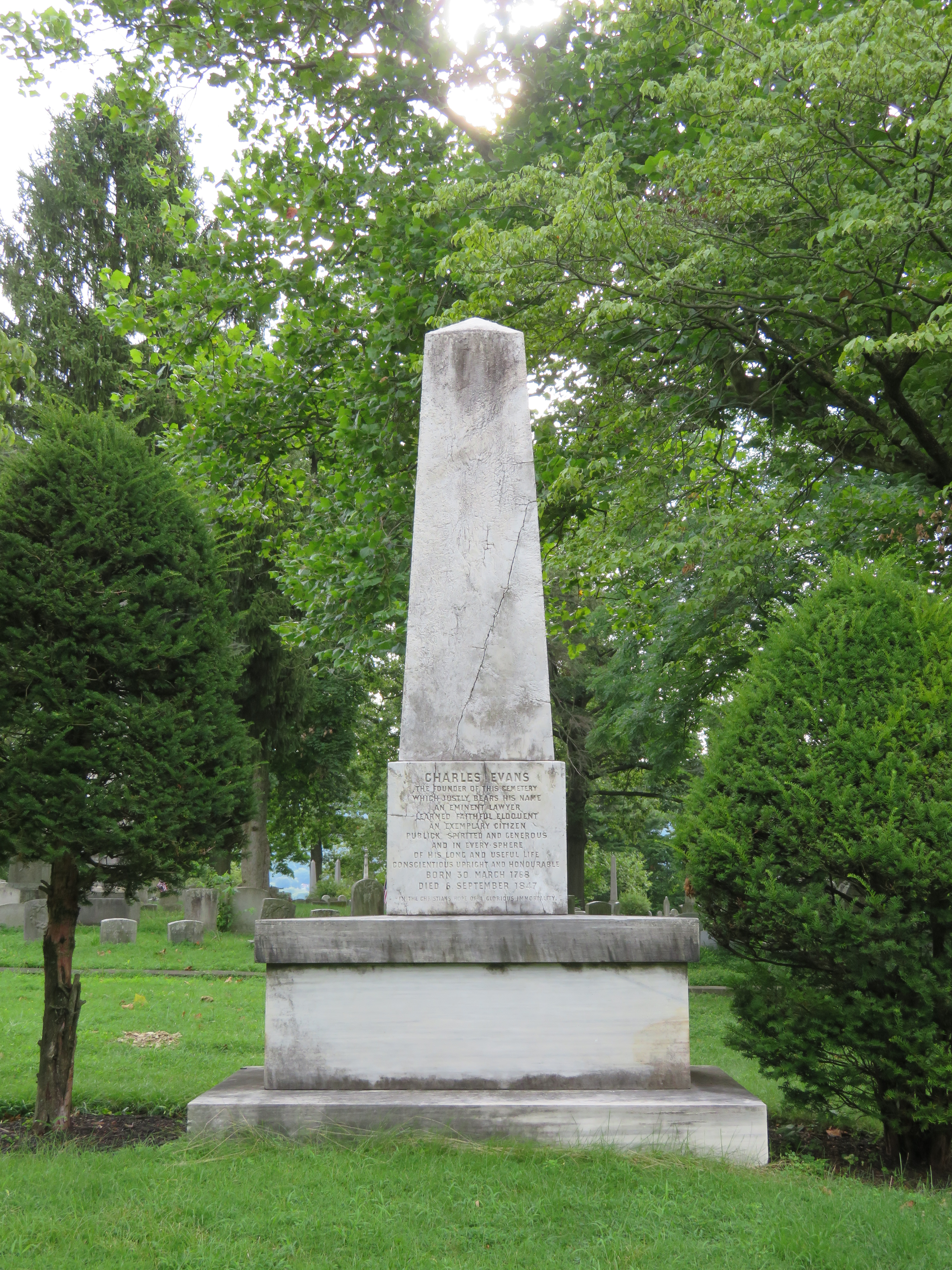
Obelisk marking the grave of the cemetery's founder, Charles Evans

Initially buried at the Reformed Church of Reading's cemetery when he died in 1823, the remains of Joseph Hiester, the fifth governor of the Commonwealth of Pennsylvania, now rest at the Charles Evans Cemetery, making his grave one of the earliest of the more than sixty-two thousand individuals who have been laid to rest here since the mid-19th century. (At the end of 1911, the total interments had reached thirty thousand four hundred and fourteen, according to the Reading Eagle.)

During the late 1880s, the remains of more than two hundred American Civil War veterans were also interred at Charles Evans after having been exhumed and relocated from potter's fields across Berks County. The site was then elevated in prominence with the placement of the city's Grand Army of the Republic monument. Erected after two years of planning and modeled after bugler Charles Gilliams of the 6th Pennsylvania Cavalry, the G.A.R. sculpture was unveiled before a large crowd on September 10, 1887, and became the gathering point, thereafter, for the city's annual Memorial Day ceremonies.

Other notable figures interred, inurned or otherwise memorialized at Charles Evans include:

- Lt. Col. George Warren Alexander (1829-1903), founder of Reading's G.W. Alexander Hat Co., former captain of the Reading Artillerists, and former second-in-command of the 47th Pennsylvania Infantry Regiment
- Sydenham Elnathan Ancona (1824-1913), U.S. Congressman (37th through 39th sessions)
- John Banks (1793-1864), U.S. Congressman (22nd through 24th sessions) and Pennsylvania State Treasurer (1847-1848)
- Michael P. Boyer (1831–1867), state politician
- Robert Grey Bushong (1883-1951), member of the Pennsylvania House of Representatives (1908 and 1909) and U.S. Congressman (70th session)
- James Henry Carpenter (1846–1898), engineer and founder of Carpenter Steel Company
- Hiester Clymer (1827-1884), Pennsylvania Senator (1860-1866) and U.S. Congressman (43rd through 46th sessions)
- Michael Constantine (1927-2021), actor
- Daniel Ermentrout (1837-1899), Reading district attorney (1862-1864) and solicitor (1867-1870), Pennsylvania Senator (1837-1880) and U.S. Congressman (47th through 50th sessions)
- Charles Joseph Esterly (1888-1940), U.S. Congressman (69th and 71st sessions)
- Charles Evans (Pennsylvania philanthropist) (1768-1847), founder of the cemetery and a prominent Reading lawyer and philanthropist
- James Lawrence Getz (1821-1891), co-founder of the Reading Gazette, member of the Pennsylvania House of Representatives (1856-1857), U.S. Congressman (40th through 42nd sessions), and City of Reading Comptroller (1888-1891)
- William Graul (1846-1909), U.S. Medal of Honor winner
- Brig.-Gen. David McMurtrie Gregg (1833-1916), colonel of the 8th Pennsylvania Cavalry and brigadier-general of volunteers, U.S. Army
- William Muhlenberg Hiester (1818-1878), Pennsylvania State Senator for the 5th district from 1853 to 1857
- William Edward Holyoke (1868-1934), U.S. Medal of Honor winner
- Edward Burd Hubley, 1792-1856), U.S. Congressman (1835-1839)
- Jehu Glancy Jones (1811-1878), Berks County district attorney (1847-1849), U.S. Congressman (32nd through-partially 35th sessions), and U.S. Minister to Austria (1858-1861)
- William ("Canada Bill") Jones (1840-1877), riverboat gambler and card sharp known for winning significant sums of money at three-card monte
- De Benneville Randolph Keim (1841-1914), American Civil War correspondent for the New York Herald and advisor to Union Army commanding general Ulysses S. Grant
- George May Keim (1805-1861), U.S. Congressman (1838-1843) and Mayor of Reading (1852)
- Brig.-Gen. William High Keim (1813-1862), Mayor of Reading (1848); general of the Pennsylvania Militia and brigadier-general of volunteers, U.S. Army; U.S. Conressman (35th session)
- Charles August Knoderer (c. 1824-1863), commanding officer, 167 Pennsylvania Infantry
- Jesse Levan (1926–1998), baseball player
- Henry Augustus Muhlenberg (1823-1854), U.S. Representative for Pennsylvania's 8th congressional district from 1853 to 1854
- Henry Augustus Muhlenberg (1848–1906), politician and lawyer
- Henry Augustus Philip Muhlenberg (1782-1844), U.S. Representative for Pennsylvania's 7th congressional district from 1829 to 1833 and Pennsylvania's 9th congressional district from 1833 to 1838
- Matthias Richards (1758-1830), U.S. Representative for Pennsylvania's 3rd congressional district from 1807 to 1811
- Henry Melchior Muhlenberg Richards (1848-1935), American military officer who served in the Union Army during the American Civil War and as a Captain during the Spanish–American War
- John Ritter (1779-1851), U.S. Representative for Pennsylvania's 9th congressional district from 1843 to 1847
- John Hoover Rothermel (1856-1922), U.S. Representative for Pennsylvania's 13th congressional district from 1907 to 1915
- William Sands (1835–1918), principal musician and first sergeant with the 88th Pennsylvania Infantry during the American Civil War, who won the U.S. Medal of Honor for capturing a Confederate army flag behind enemy lines in the Battle of Dabney's Mill/Hatcher's Run, Virginia (February 6–7, 1865)
- Alexander Schimmelfennig (1824-1865), Union Army general in the U.S. Civil War
- John Schwartz (1793-1860), U.S. Representative for Pennsylvania's 8th congressional district from 1859 to 1860
- Amanda E. Stout (1864-1933), first female superintendent of schools in Reading, the only female superintendent of schools in the Commonwealth of Pennsylvania in 1933, and the person for whom Reading's Amanda E. Stout Elementary School was named
- Matilda Edwards Strong (1822-1851), reportedly a rival to Mary Todd for the affections of Abraham Lincoln and later the sister-in-law of William Strong, who became a U.S. Supreme Court Justice
- Justice William Strong (1808-1895), Associate Justice of the U.S. Supreme Court (1870-1880), former Justice of the Pennsylvania Supreme Court, and former U.S. Congressman (1847-1851)
- Constantine Gus Yatron (1927-2003), U.S. Representative for Pennsylvania's 6th congressional district from 1969 to 1993

== See also ==
- Henry Jackson Ellicott

== Gallery ==
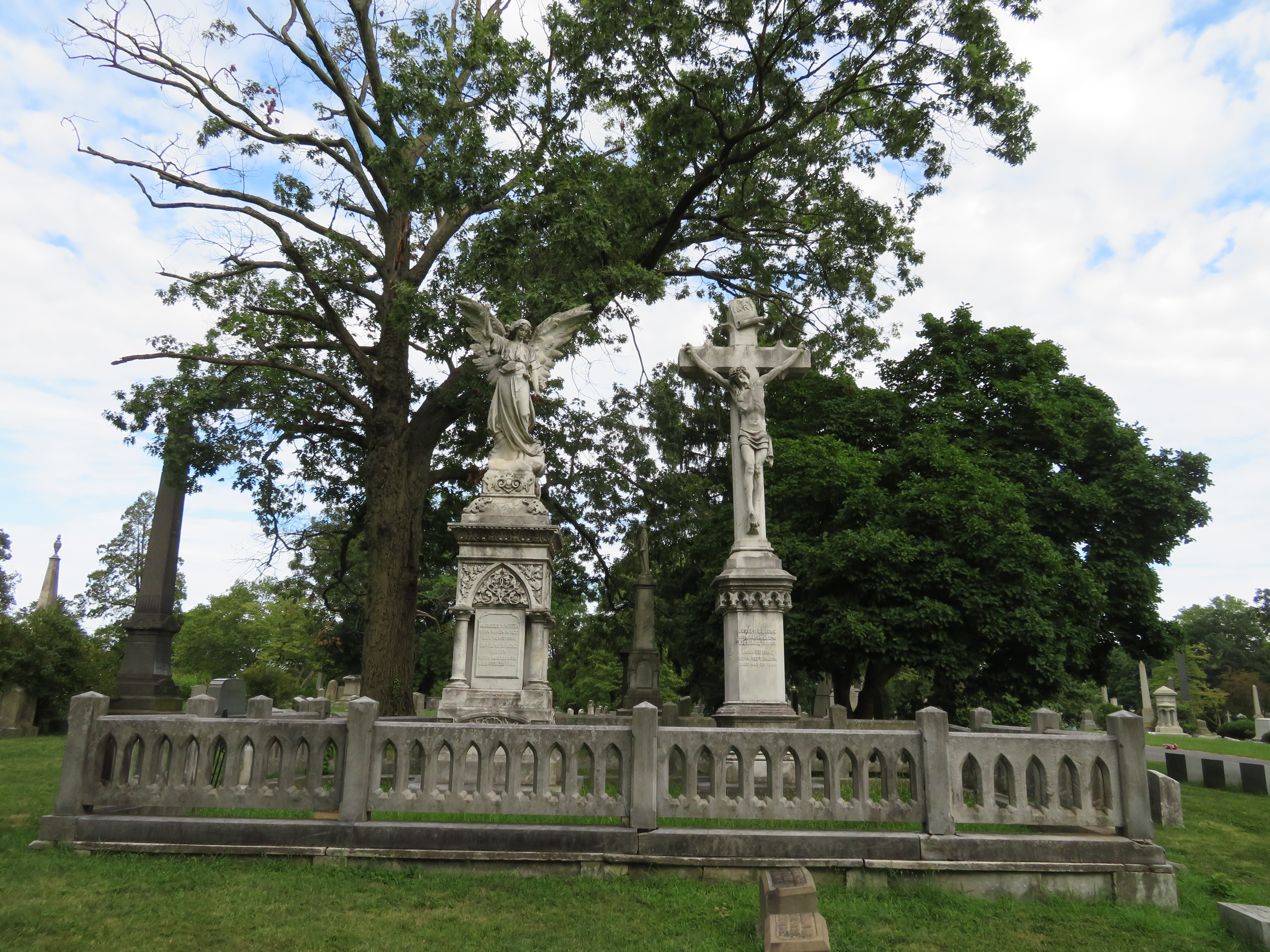
Augustus Heston and Joseph DeLong

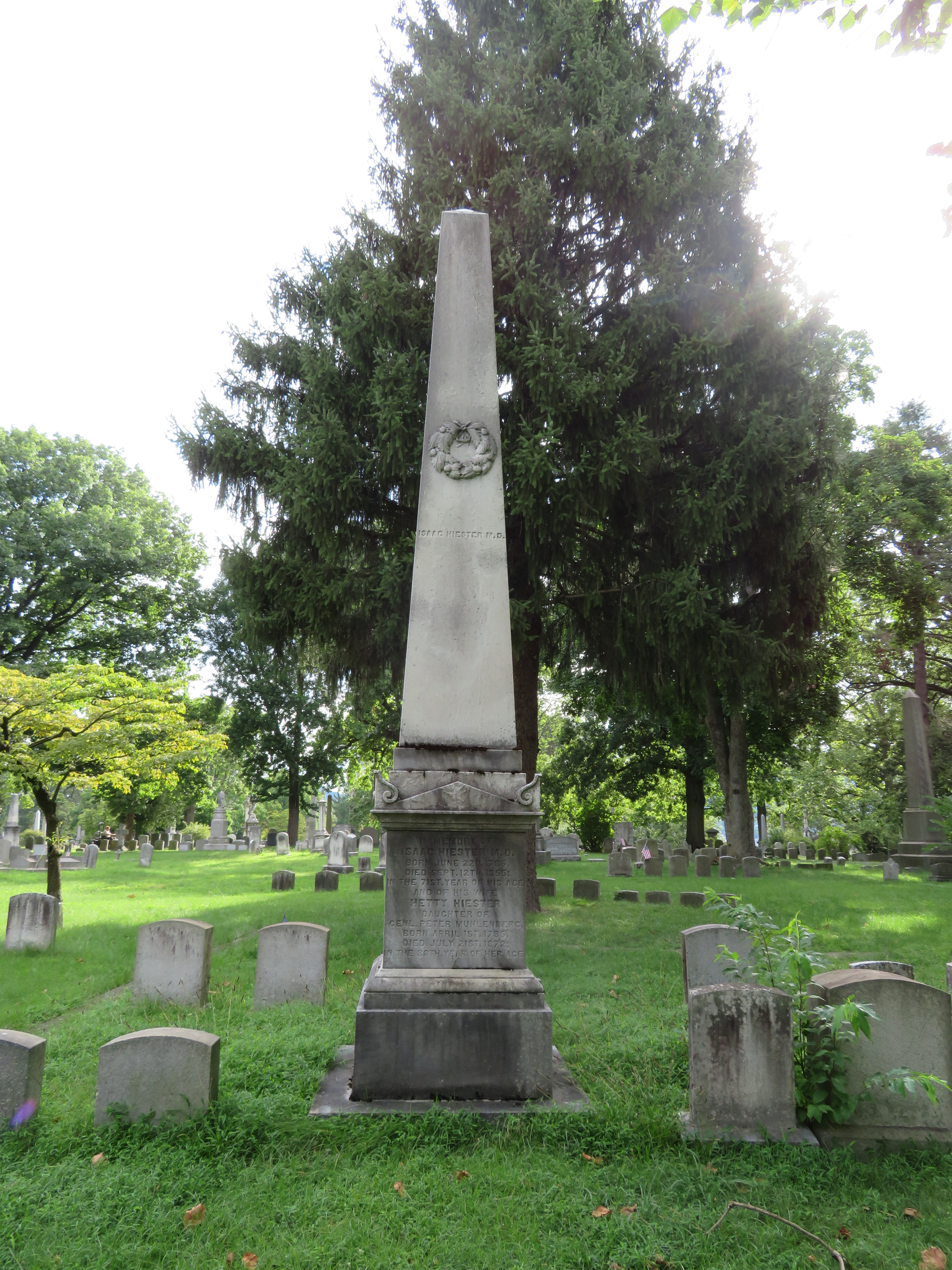
Isaac Hiester, M.D.

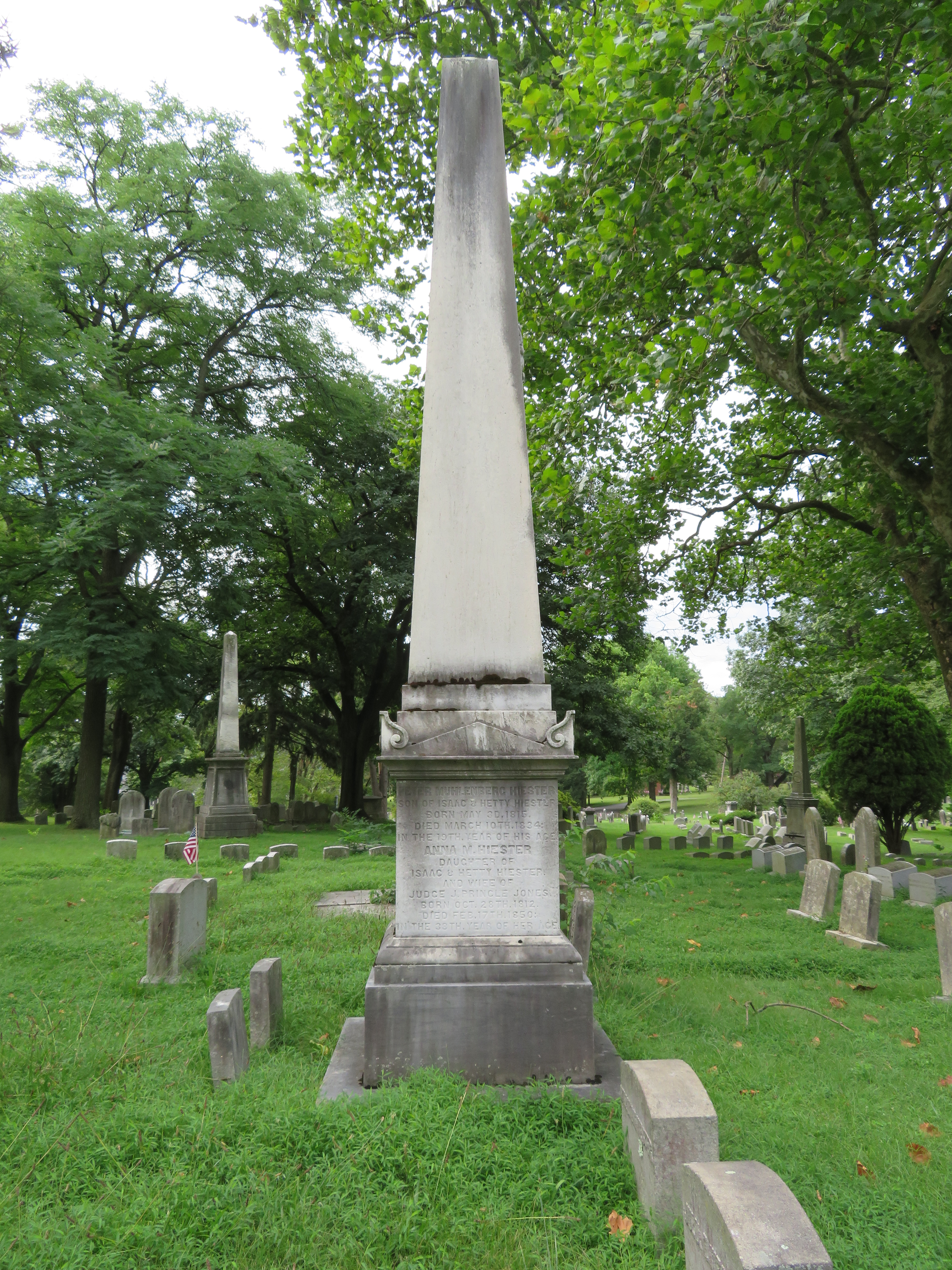
Peter Muhlenberg Hiester

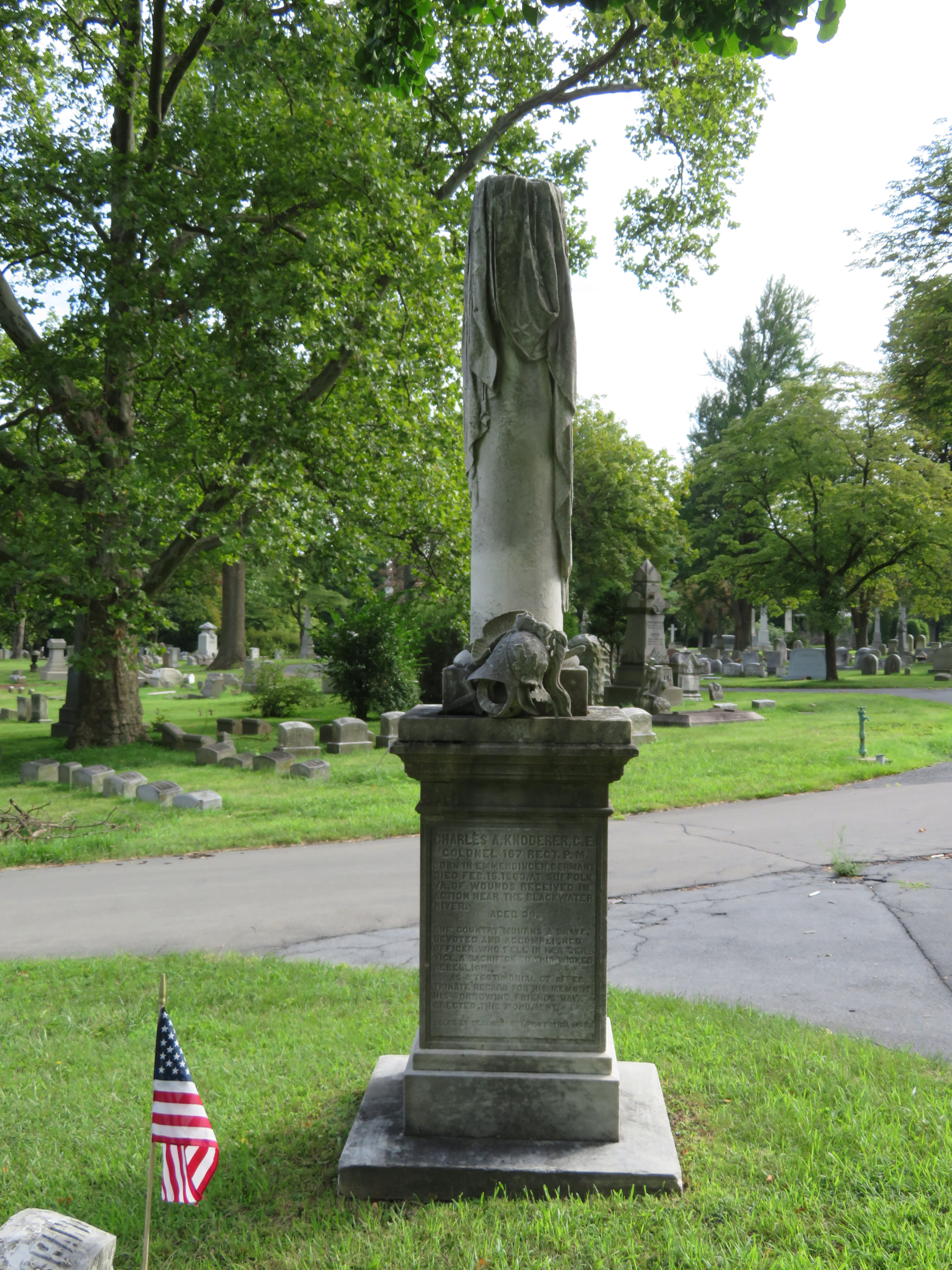
Charles Knoderer

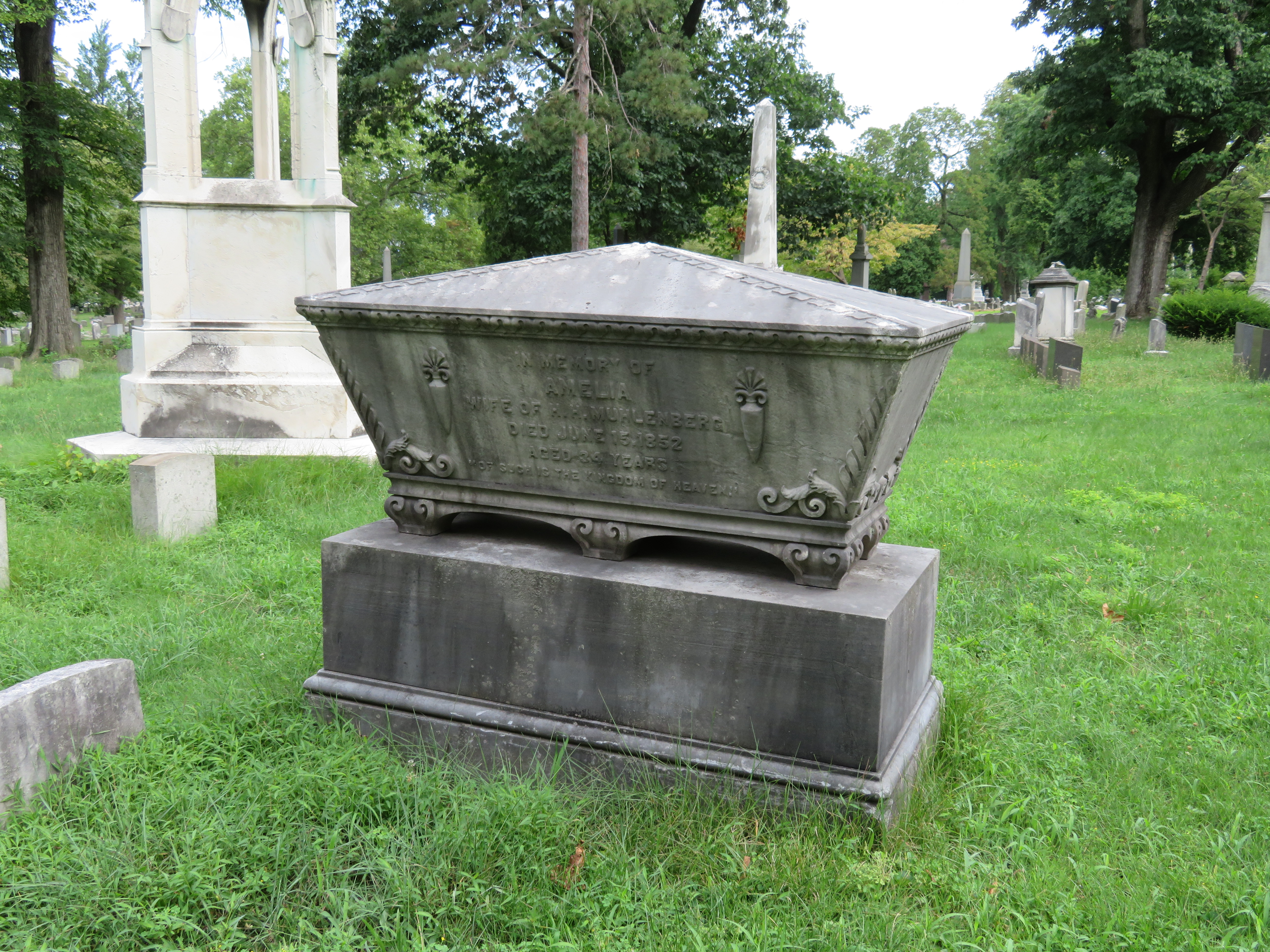
Amelia Muhlenberg

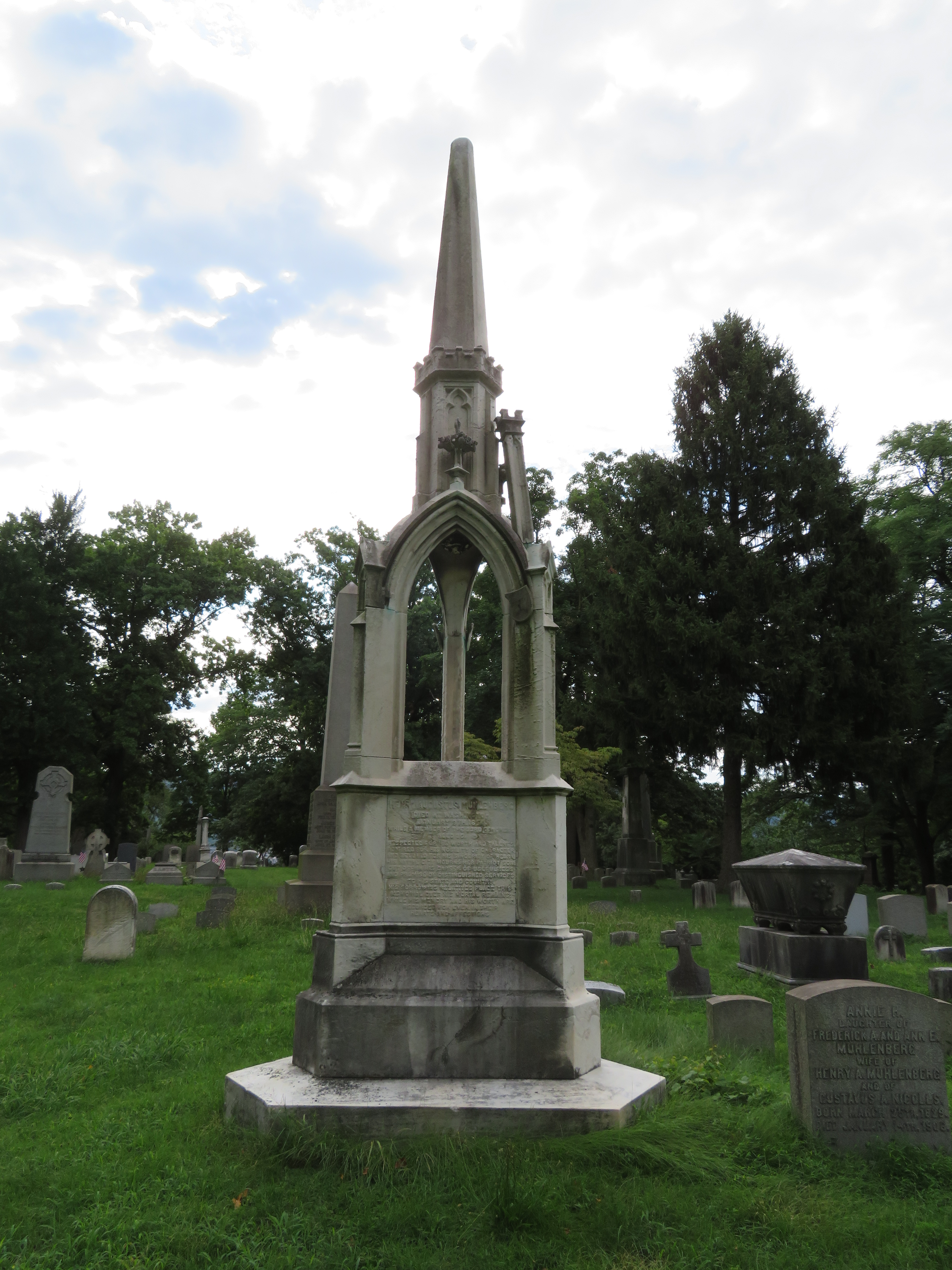
Henry Augustus Muhlenberg

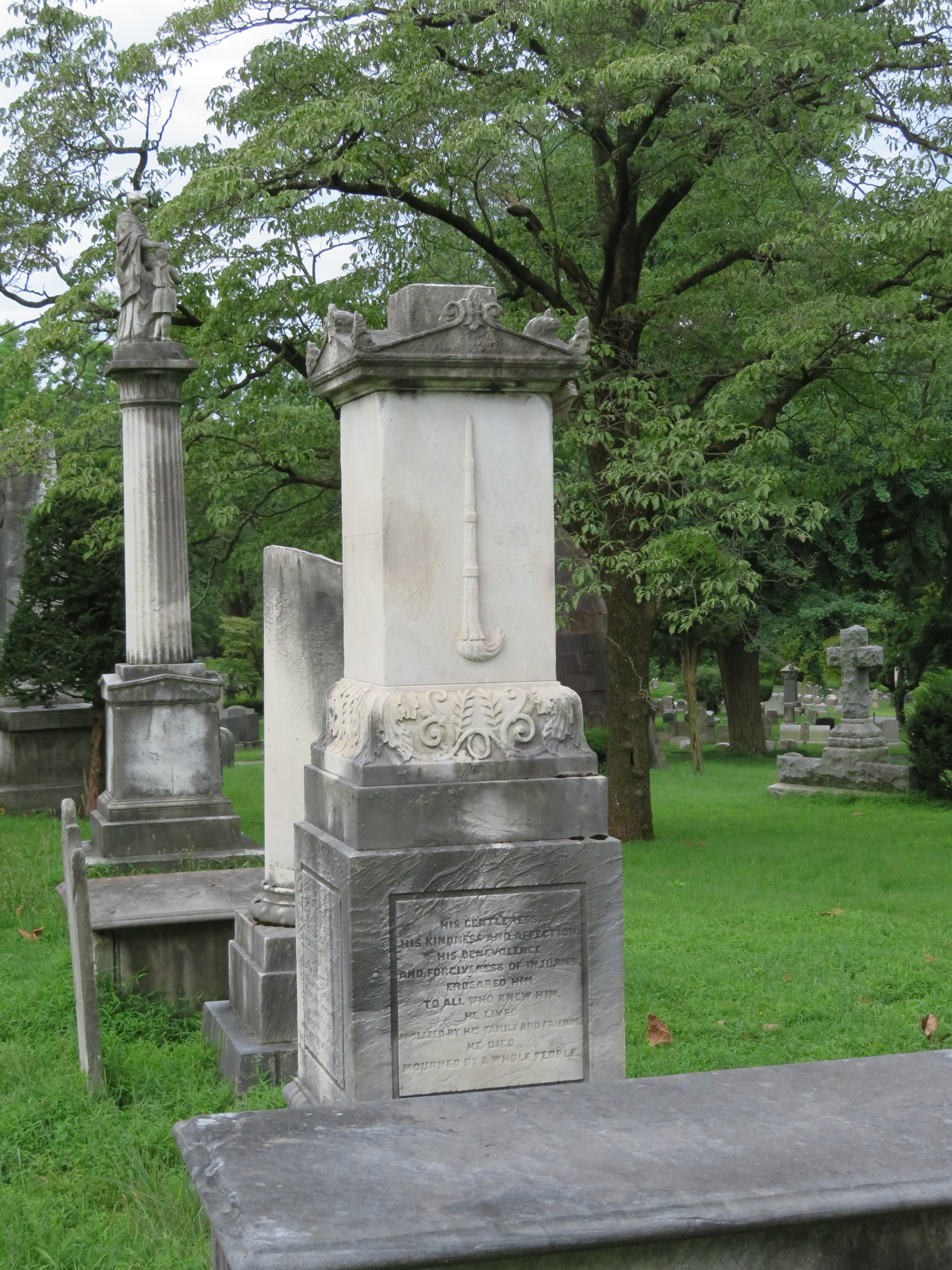
Henry A.P. Muhlenberg

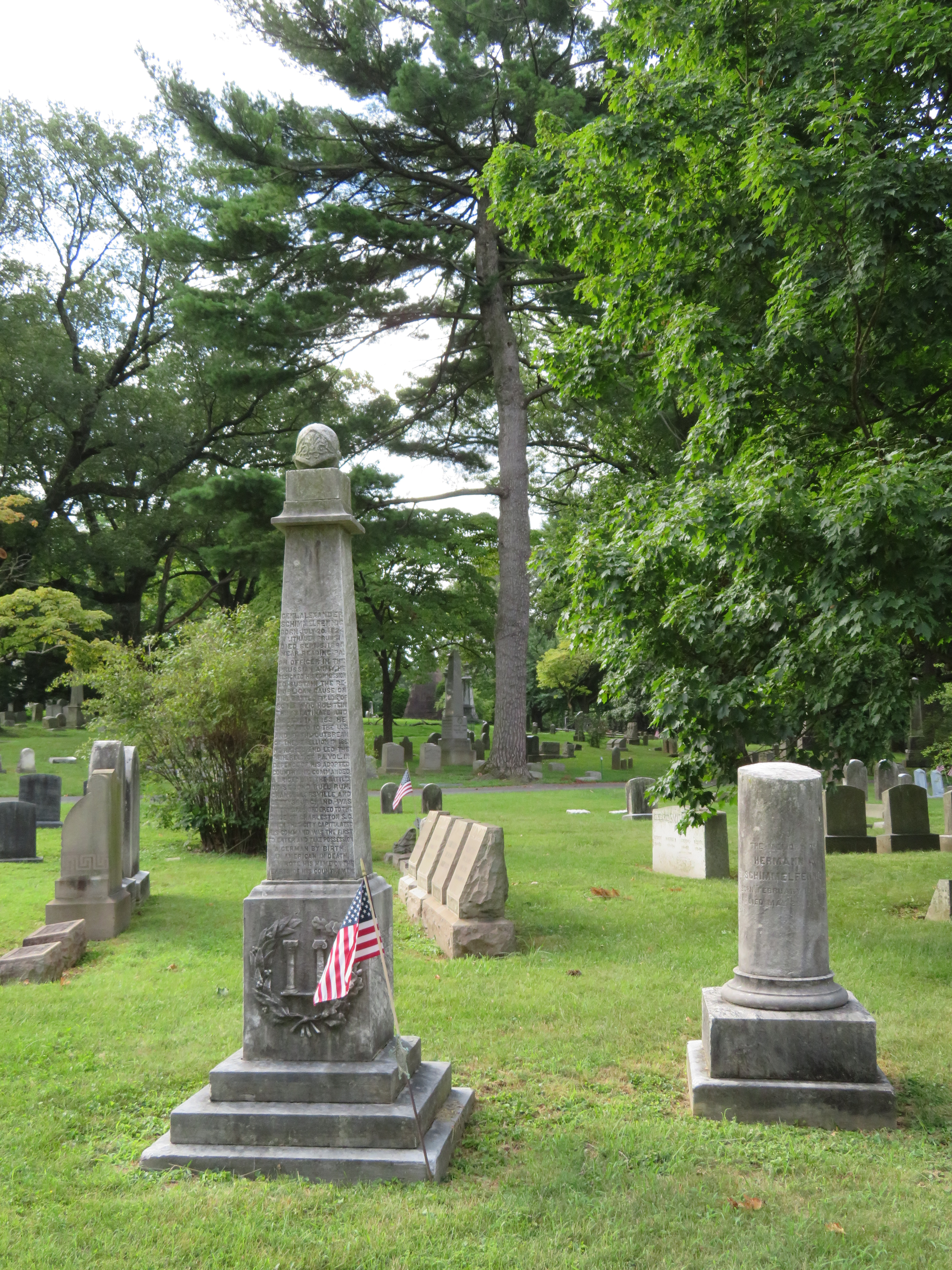
Alexander Schimmelfennig
