= Eugene Shirk =

American politician

Mayor of Reading, Pennsylvania
- In office 1964–1968
- Preceded by: John C. Kubacki
- Succeeded by: Victor Yarnell
- In office 1972–1976
- Preceded by: Victor Yarnell
- Succeeded by: Joseph Kuzminski

Personal details
- Born: April 14, 1901 Adamstown, Pennsylvania, U.S.
- Died: February 17, 1994 (aged 92) Reading, Pennsylvania, U.S.
- Party: Republican
- Spouse: Annadora (Spengler) Vesper
- Education: Franklin & Marshall College

Eugene Leid Shirk (April 14, 1901 – February 17, 1994) was an American politician who served as the Mayor of Reading, Pennsylvania for two terms as a Republican. He was also the president of Berks Community Television, and a professor at Albright College.

== Early life ==
Shirk was born and raised in Adamstown, Pennsylvania. He graduated from Ephrata High School in 1918. His family was unable to afford to send him to college, so he worked at knitting mills in Reading to pay for tuition. Shirk graduated Phi Beta Kappa from Franklin & Marshall College in 1924 and won letters in cross country his junior and senior seasons. He also pursued graduate work at the University of Pennsylvania.

== Educator ==
After graduating, Shirk spent eighteen years as a math teacher and physical director at Birdsboro High School. He coached Birdsboro's track team to the Pennsylvania Interscholastic Athletic Association Class B title in 1937. He also led the school's baseball team to five division titles and one of his players, Randy Gumpert, was signed to a major league contract. In 1938, he became Birdsboro's principal while continuing to coach.

In 1942, Shirk became a mathematics instructor and athletic director at Albright College. However, before he could begin his duties, he was drafted into the United States Army Air Corps, where he served as a physical training instructor and weather forecaster during World War II. He was discharged in 1945 and returned to Albright. Shirk was also a vice president of the Middle Atlantic States Collegiate Athletics Association, now called the Middle Atlantic Conferences.

== Mayor ==
On February 21, 1963, Shirk announced his campaign for mayor of Reading. He defeated insurance salesman George F. Graeff 4,217 votes to 1,111 to win the Republican nomination. As a 62-year-old who had never run for office before and a Republican running in a city where the Democrats outnumbered them by a 3 to 1 margin, Shirk was an underdog in the general election. However, the city had been the site of multiple federal raids and its incumbent Democratic mayor, John C. Kubacki, was under indictment for extortion. Shirk upset Democrat Harold L. Guldin and Republicans won every office except for city treasurer.

After taking office, Shirk replaced the city's police chief (who was also under indictment) and launched a crackdown on gambling and prostitution. This included an unpopular decision to shut down bingo, which was illegal in Pennsylvania. In 1967, he was defeated for reelection by Victor Yarnell.

While serving as mayor, Shirk continued to work as Albright's athletic director on a parttime basis. He was associate athletic director during the 1967–68 academic year then served as an advisor to the president.

In 1968, Shirk was an unsuccessful candidate for the 126th district seat in the Pennsylvania House of Representatives. In 1971, he defeated city councilor Joseph Kuzminski by 827 votes to return to the mayor's office. He did not run for reelection in 1975 and instead was an unsuccessful candidate for the Berks County Commission.

== Later life ==
After leaving office, Shirk returned to Albright to coach the cross country team, a position he held until his death. At 92 years old, he was the oldest active coach in college sports.

In 1976, Shirk helped found Berks Community Television and served as its president until his death. In 1981, Albright's athletic field was renamed in honor of Shirk.

Shirk was married to Annadora (Spengler) Vesper, a professor of English and speech at Albright who served on the Reading School Board from 1951 to 1957. The couple had a daughter, Thea, as well a son, Al, from Annadora's previous marriage.

On February 17, 1994, Eugene and Annadora were killed in automobile accident in Reading. The two were on their way to Albright College, where they were starring in a performance of Love Letters.
