= Charles Evans (Pennsylvania philanthropist) =

American attorney and philanthropist (1768–1847)

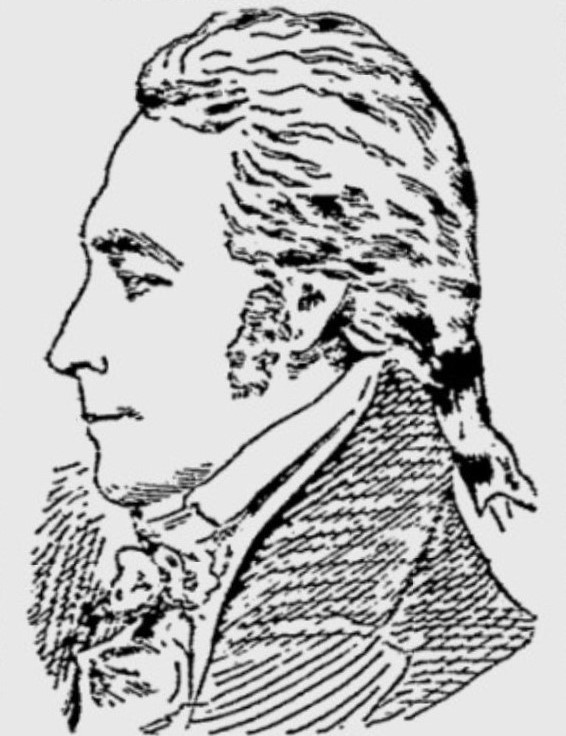
- Charles Evans, circa 1840s
- Born: March 30, 1768; Philadelphia, Pennsylvania, British America
- Died: September 6, 1847 (aged 79); Trexlertown, Pennsylvania, U.S.
- Resting place: Charles Evans Cemetery
- Occupations: Attorney; philanthropist
- Notable work: Founder of the Charles Evans Cemetery; founding member of the Reading Artillerists
- Spouse: Mary Keene (m. 1794)
- Children: Charles Evans and Mary Evans
- Parent(s): David Evans and Letitia (Thomas) Evans

Charles Evans (1768-1847) was an American attorney, civic leader and philanthropist during the late 18th and early 19th centuries. He established the Charles Evans Cemetery, an historic, nonsectarian, garden-style, public cemetery located in the city of Reading, Pennsylvania.

== Family and formative years ==
Born in Philadelphia, Pennsylvania on March 30, 1768, Charles Evans (1768-1847) was the ninth of ten children born to Philadelphia native David Evans and Letitia (Thomas) Evans, a native of Radnor, Pennsylvania. His parents were both members of the Society of Friends.

Taking up the study of law in 1788 with Benjamin Chew, a prominent Pennsylvania attorney who had served as attorney general during the state’s colonial years and then as chief justice of the Supreme Court of Pennsylvania, Charles Evans was admitted to the Berks County bar in June 1791. In August of that same year, he began dividing his legal work between his hometown of Philadelphia and the city of Reading in Berks County, Pennsylvania, where he opened a new law office.

In 1794, Evans wed Philadelphia native Mary Keene (1769-1838), who was a daughter of Philadelphia alderman Reynold Keene (1738-1800) and Christiana (Stille) Keene (1744-1777).

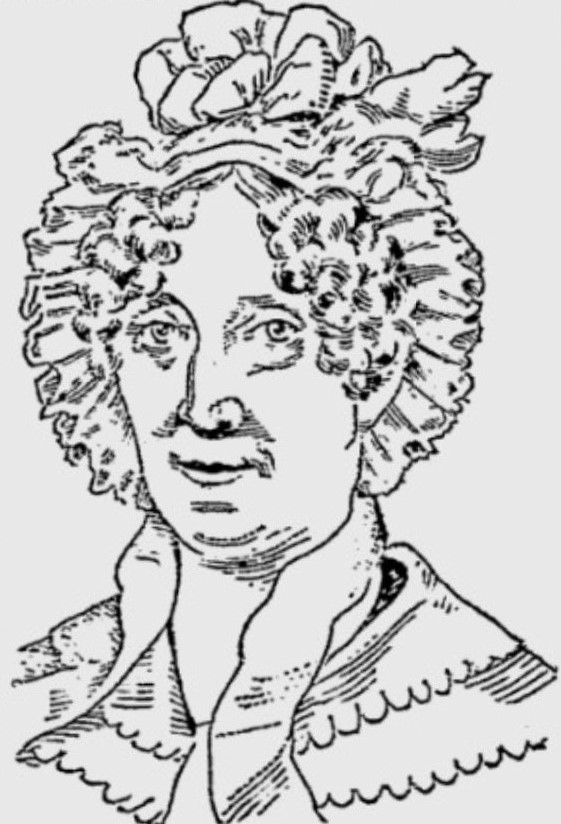
Mary (Keene) Evans, circa 1830s

Evans and his wife, Mary, were both members of the Episcopal Church. They had at least two children together, Charles and Mary Evans, both of whom died young and were buried in the Episcopal graveyard, and who were later memorialized by the placement of small headstones next to their parents' graves at Charles Evans Cemetery in 1847. In a posthumous biography of the couple that was published in an 1886 edition of The Reading Eagle, a longtime friend described Mary (Keene) Evans as "a noble, educated, refined and most excellent lady, who was liked as well if not better, than any other woman in Reading." The friend went on to state that Charles and Mary Evans "were so well suited to each other, that they were frequently referred to as the model husband and wife of the town."

== Legal career and civic leadership ==
Posthumously described in an 1886 biographical sketch in The Reading Times as "the most eloquent pleader in court" and a "tall, commanding" man with "courtly bearing," Evans initially practiced law in Pennsylvania's third judicial circuit, which included, Berks, Luzerne, Northampton, and Northumberland counties, gradually building "a large practice" that "won fame and distinction." A man of "excellent health," he reportedly never missed a day in court during one thirteen-year period of his legal career.

During the late 1700s, Charles Evans also played an active role in the development of the Reading Public Library, the sixth public library to have been created in the United States. A member of the library’s board of directors, he later went on to serve as the board’s president for one term.

He was also a founding member of the Reading Artillerists, a local militia group established on March 23, 1794, according to Pennsylvania historian Morton L. Montgomery.

In 1809, Evans served on the three-member legal defense team that represented Susanna Cox during the initial criminal trial in which she was convicted of murdering her infant. In 1823, Evans was a member of the three-member legal defense team that represented John Zimmerman during the unsuccessful appeal of his conviction for the murder of his daughter, Rosina.

As his law practice continued to grow, so did his personal wealth and reputation as a civic-minded individual. In July 1824, he delivered an address during dedication ceremonies for the opening of a new stretch of canal between Reading and Philadelphia.

Having initially spent his winters in Philadelphia, where he and his wife lived in a "York row residence," and two months out of the year in Reading while devoting the remaining time to his travels to multiple counties for circuit work as an attorney, Evans sold his home in Philadelphia and permanently relocated to Reading in 1826 after buying a home on South Fifth Street. He then began reducing his legal travel, restricting his work primarily to Berks, Lehigh and Schuylkill counties.

Although largely retired from the practice of law by 1828, Evans continued to accept cases periodically. Having made his "last lengthy legal argument in 1840," he "tried his last case, at the age of 75 years," but "made no charges for his services because he was accommodating several old friends."

Politically, he was a member of the Federalist Party and then the Whig Party before joining the Republican Party.

== Death of his wife, philanthropy and later years ==
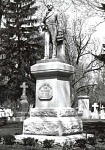
Sculpture of Charles Evans located near the entrance of the Charles Evans Cemetery, Reading, Pennsylvania

On July 31, 1838, Evans’ wife, Mary (Keene) Evans, died in Reading, leaving him as a widower with no surviving immediate family members. She was initially interred at the Episcopal Church cemetery where their children had been buried.

Eight years later, Evans began a project that would occupy the remainder of his life—the establishment of a non-sectarian cemetery for members of the general public to bury relatives and friends in a pleasant, park-like, meditative setting. Donating the first twenty-five acres of land in 1846, he also contributed $2,000 to fund the cemetery’s initial operations. More than 175 years later, that cemetery still bears his name.

That same year, cemetery directors dedicated a life-sized sculpture of Evans. Crafted in bronze by A. S. Esterly and set atop a ten-foot-tall granite base, the six-foot-tall replica is located near the cemetery’s entrance and depicts Evans dressed in a waist coat, shirt with cravat, and trousers with his right hand holding a pair of gloves and his left holding a scroll.

In addition, Evans also funded the liberal arts education of several daughters "of several good citizens," according to The Reading Eagle.

=== Illness, death, burial, and legacy ===
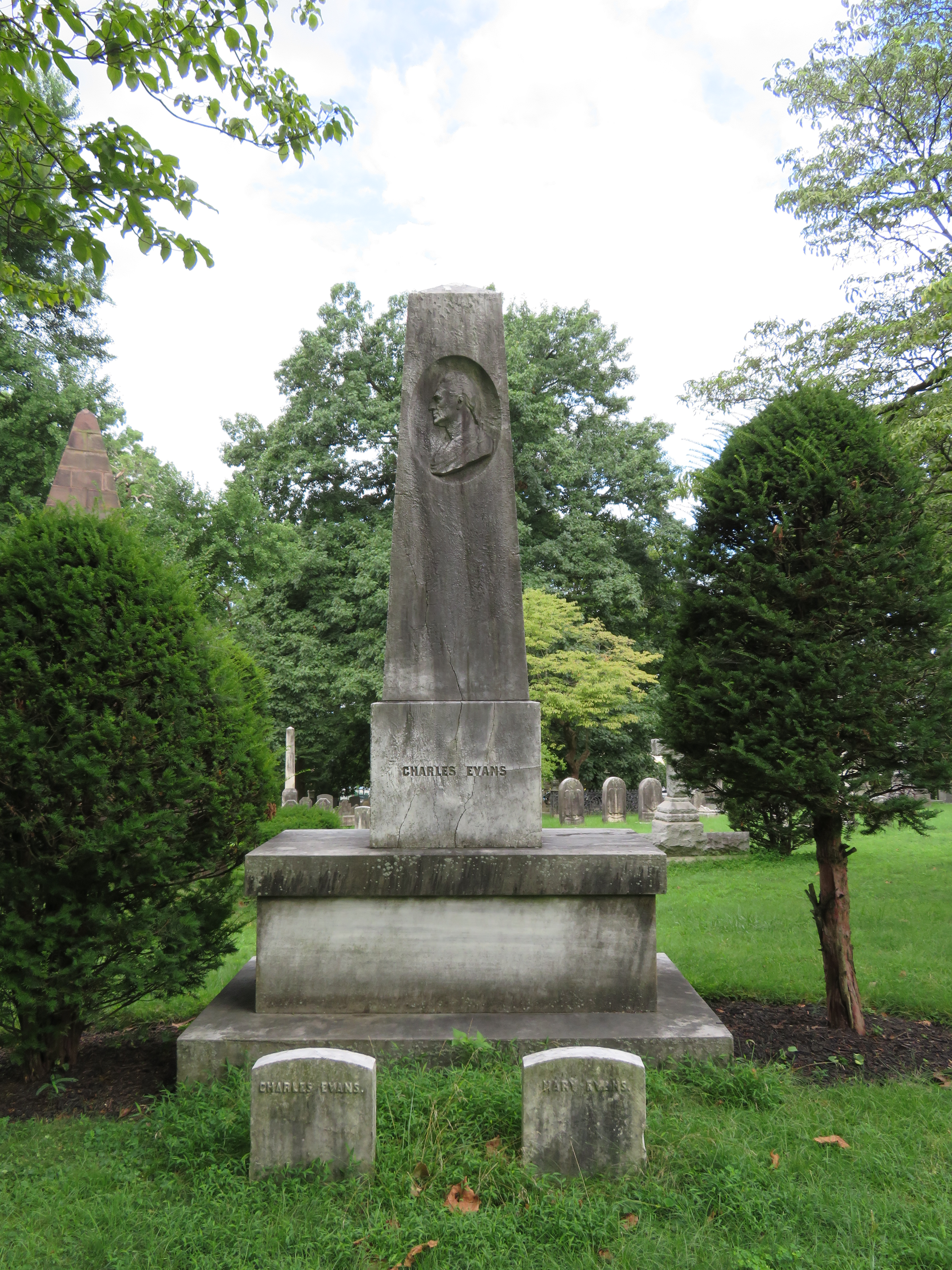
Graves of Charles Evans and his wife, Mary (Keene) Evans, Charles Evans Cemetery, Reading, Pennsylvania, 2020

During the summer of 1847, Evans traveled with a party of friends and staff members of his household to Bethlehem, Pennsylvania to take two young women, Mary McFatridge and Rose McGovern, to school there as part of the educational support that he was providing to the women. While on a stopover at a hotel in Trexlertown, during the party's return trip, he suffered a stroke on August 2 while out walking for exercise, an activity he had performed frequently throughout his life. Paralyzed and unable to complete his journey to Reading due to his frail condition, Evans was brought to the home of David Schall, where he was provided medical care by Reading area physicians, including "Drs Isaac Hiester, Owen Wesley, Kerst and Haberacker." Coordination of Evans' care was handled by his friend and fellow attorney, W. N. Coleman, who had been Evans' frequent traveling companion over the past several years and had been a member of the party traveling to and from Bethlehem. A total of fourteen horses were reportedly used to transport medical supplies and personnel to and from Trexlertown during Evans' month-long convalescence, but the damage was too severe. After completing his last will and testament with Coleman's help, Evans died at the Schall home on the morning of September 6, 1847. At the time of his death, Evans was the last surviving member of the Reading Artillerists.

Evans' remains were returned to Reading that same evening (September 6, 1847), and he was interred three days later at the cemetery that he had founded and which still bears his name. At Evans' direction, the remains of his widow, Mary, were subsequently exhumed from the Episcopal Church graveyard and reinterred beside his by Jacob Gnau, the longtime sexton at Charles Evans Cemetery. Gnau also attempted to locate and move the remains of the Evans' children, but was unable to locate them due to their advanced state of decay.

A monument with a tall shaft marks the Evans' graves, the front of which is inscribed with the following tribute to Evans:

"CHARLES EVANS.
The founder of this cemetery which justly bears his name
an Eminent Lawyer
Learned, faithful, eloquent
an exemplary citizen
Publick spirited and generous, and in every sphere of his long and useful life
conscientious, upright and honorable.
Born 30 of March, 1768
Died 6 September, 1847
In the Christians hope of a glorious immortality."

The back of the marker bears the following tribute to Evans' wife, Mary:

"MARY EVANS,
wife of CHARLES EVANS.
Eminent for the powers of her mind
And the benevolence of her heart
She died beloved and lamented
30 August 1838
In the seventieth year of her age."

Members of the Charles Evans Cemetery Company's board of directors and Reading Bar Association subsequently paid tribute to Evans by wearing "crepe on their left arms for 30 days."

As part of the resolution of Evans' estate, an additional bequest of slightly more than $10,000 (roughly $67,000 today) was made to the Charles Evans Cemetery Company to establish an endowment fund that would provide for the perpetual care of the cemetery’s buildings, grounds and the graves of those interred there.
