= William H. Keim =

American politician (1813–1862)

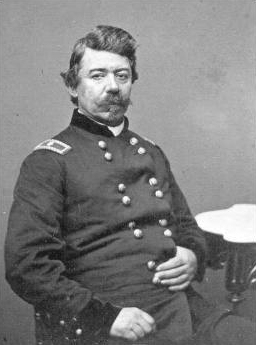
- William High Keim

Surveyor General of Pennsylvania
- In office May 1, 1860 – December 20, 1861
- Preceded by: John Roe
- Succeeded by: Henry Souther

Member of the U.S. House of Representatives from Pennsylvania's 8th district
- In office November 30, 1858 – March 3, 1859
- Preceded by: J. Glancy Jones
- Succeeded by: John Schwartz

2nd Mayor of Reading, Pennsylvania
- In office 1848–1849
- Preceded by: Peter Filbert
- Succeeded by: George Getz

Personal details
- Born: William High Keim; June 13, 1813 Reading, Pennsylvania, U.S.
- Died: May 18, 1862 (aged 48) Harrisburg, Pennsylvania, U.S.
- Resting place: Charles Evans Cemetery
- Party: Whig; Republican
- Relatives: George May Keim (uncle)

Military service
- Allegiance: United States of America; Union
- Branch/service: United States Army; Pennsylvania Militia; Union Army
- Years of service: 1861–1862
- Rank: Major General
- Battles/wars: American Civil War

William High Keim (June 13, 1813 – May 18, 1862) was a Republican member of the U.S. House of Representatives from Pennsylvania, as well as a general in the Union Army during the American Civil War.

== Early life and career ==
William High Keim (a nephew of George May Keim) was born on June 13, 1813, in Reading, Pennsylvania, to Mary (née High) and Benneville Keim. His father was president of Farmers' Bank and served as mayor of Reading. He attended Mount Airy Military School and graduated around 1829. After he graduated, he worked in the general hardware store of his father in Reading. He partnered with his brother John H. Keim in a large store and continued as a retailer for about 30 years. At the age of 17, he became a sergeant of the Washington Grays. In 1837, he succeeded his cousin Daniel M. Keim as captain of the Grays and became major general of the Fifth Division of the Pennsylvania Volunteers in 1842.

Keim was a Whig. He served as the second Mayor of Reading in 1848. Keim was elected as a Republican to the Thirty-fifth Congress to fill a short term vacancy caused by the resignation of J. Glancy Jones after Jones's defeat in the election of 1858. He was surveyor general of Pennsylvania from 1860 to 1862.

== Civil War ==
Even before the Civil War officially started, Keim anticipated rebellion and as early as January 21, 1861, he notified a fellow Reading militia commander to keep his unit ready for immediate service if war should break out.

Following the Baltimore riot of 1861, the mayor of the city, with approval from Governor Hicks, ordered a militia unit, the Baltimore County Horse Guards, to destroy the railroad bridge north of Baltimore in order to prevent more Federal troops from entering the city. A lieutenant in the Horse Guards, John Merryman, was arrested by Keim. His arrest and imprisonment eventually led to an important Federal case on the suspension of habeas corpus.

Initially, Keim enlisted in the Union Army for a term of 3 months and, due primarily to his political ties to Governor Andrew Curtin, he was commissioned as a major general of Pennsylvania Volunteers on April 20, 1861. His original term of enlistment having expired, he was honorably mustered out on July 21, 1861, and returned to Reading.

As the war lengthened and it became evident that a quick victory was not in sight, Keim decided to re-enlist, this time for a term of 3 years. Governor Curtin commissioned him as a brigadier general of volunteers on December 20, 1861. However, Keim died of typhus while in the military service at Harrisburg, Pennsylvania, on May 18, 1862. Interment was in the Charles Evans Cemetery in Reading.

== See also ==
- Ex parte Merryman
- List of American Civil War generals (Union)

U.S. House of Representatives
Preceded by J. Glancy Jones	Member of the U.S. House of Representatives from Pennsylvania's 8th congressional district 1858-1859	Succeeded by John Schwartz
