= Michael P. Boyer =

American politician (1831–1867)

Member of the Pennsylvania House of Representatives from the Berks County district
- In office 1861–1861

Personal details
- Born: Michael Pellman Boyer; September 13, 1831 Berks County, Pennsylvania, U.S.
- Died: August 29, 1867 (aged 35) Reading, Pennsylvania, U.S.
- Party: Democratic
- Spouse: Margaret Loag
- Children: 2
- Occupation: Politician; lawyer

Michael Pellman Boyer (September 13, 1831 – August 29, 1867) was an American politician from Pennsylvania.

== Early life ==
Michael Pellman Boyer was born on September 13, 1831, in Gibraltar Forge, Berks County, Pennsylvania, to Rebecca (née Pellman) and Michael K. Boyer. He attended preparatory school in Bernville and moved to Reading in 1849. His brother was Dr. Samuel Pellman Boyer.

After moving to Reading, Boyer worked for three years as an assistant at the prothonotary's office. He studied law under H. W. Smith and J. Pringle and was admitted to the bar on August 8, 1853.

== Career ==
Boyer was clerk of the common council from 1858 to 1859. He was a Democrat. He served as a member of the Pennsylvania House of Representatives, representing Berks County in 1861.

From August 16, 1862, to May 1863, Boyer served as first lieutenant of Company H of the 128th Pennsylvania Infantry Regiment during the Civil War. He also worked as a lawyer. In 1867, he was appointed commissioner of the United States Court of Claims for Pennsylvania's 8th congressional district.

== Personal life ==
Boyer married Margaret Loag. They had two sons, Walter and Richard L. He lived at 221 North 6th Street in Reading.

Boyer died on August 29, 1867, in Reading. He was buried in Charles Evans Cemetery.
