= William M. Croll =

American politician

William Martin Croll
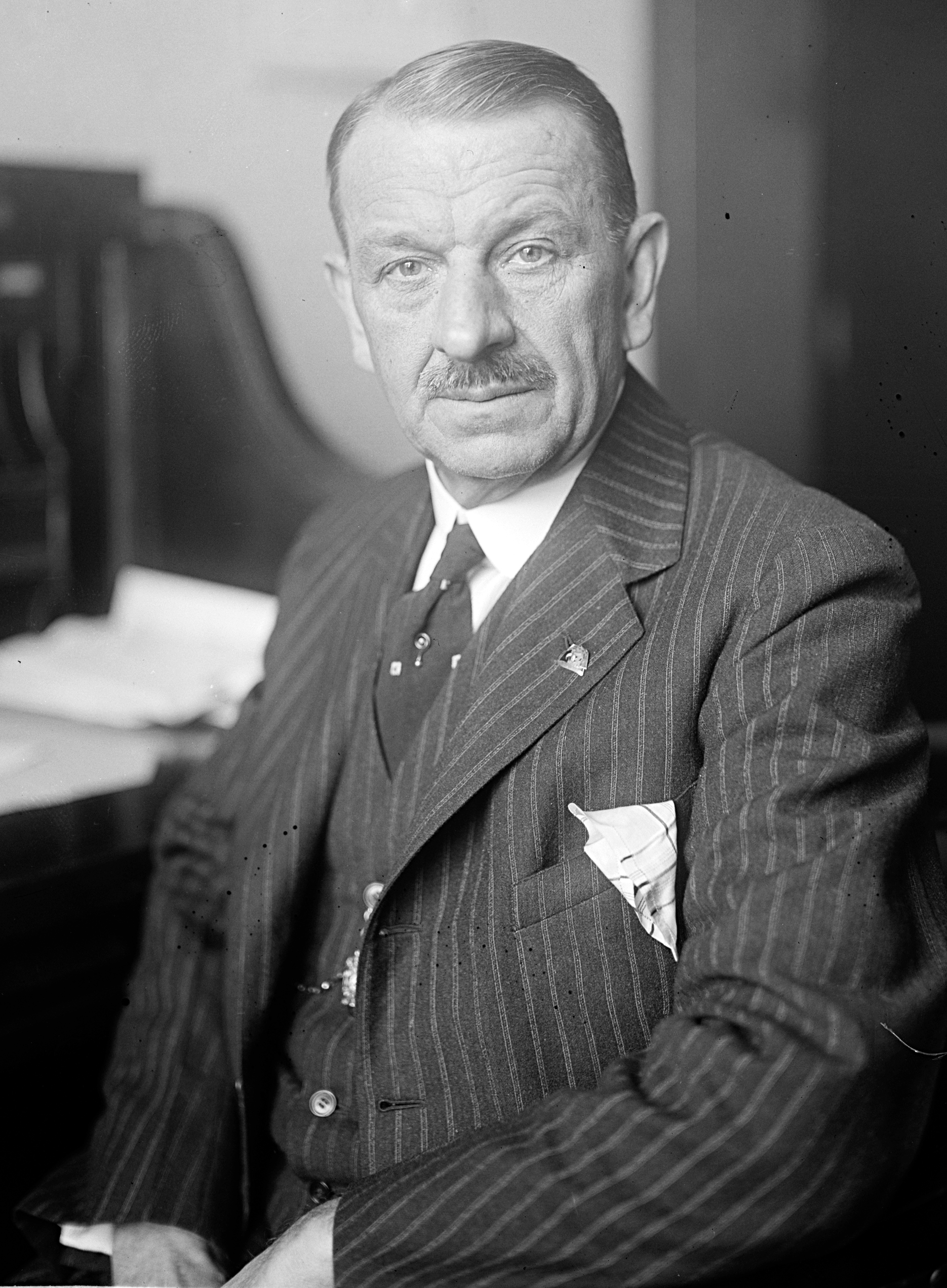
- Croll in 1923

Member of the U.S. House of Representatives from Pennsylvania's 14th district
- In office March 4, 1923 – March 3, 1925
- Preceded by: Louis Thomas McFadden
- Succeeded by: Charles Joseph Esterly

Personal details
- Born: April 9, 1866 Upper Macungie Township, Pennsylvania, U.S.
- Died: October 21, 1929 (aged 63) Reading, Pennsylvania, U.S.
- Party: Democratic

Military service
- Branch/service: United States Navy
- Years of service: 1913–1918
- Battles/wars: World War I

William Martin Croll (April 9, 1866 – October 21, 1929) was a Democratic member of the U.S. House of Representatives from Pennsylvania.

== Early life and education ==
Croll was born on April 9, 1866 in Upper Macungie Township, Pennsylvania. He attended Keystone State Normal School in Kutztown, Pennsylvania, and graduated from the Eastman Business College in Poughkeepsie, New York.

== Career ==
He taught school, and moved to Maxatawny, Pennsylvania, in 1889, where he engaged in the general merchandise business. He moved to Reading, Pennsylvania, in 1897 and engaged in the retail clothing business and in banking. He also served as the county treasurer of Berks County, Pennsylvania.

During World War I, from 1913 to 1918, he served as U.S. Navy officer at the Port of Philadelphia. He was a delegate to the Democratic National Conventions in 1912 and 1920.

Croll was elected as a Democrat to the Sixty-eighth Congress, but was an unsuccessful candidate for reelection in 1924. He resumed mercantile pursuits, died in Reading on October 21, 1929, and was interred in Laureldale Cemetery in Laureldale, Pennsylvania.

U.S. House of Representatives
Preceded by Louis Thomas McFadden	Member of the U.S. House of Representatives from Pennsylvania's 14th congressional district 1923–1925	Succeeded by Charles Joseph Esterly
