= Victor Yarnell =

American politician

41st Mayor of Reading, Pennsylvania
- In office 1968–1972
- Preceded by: Eugene Shirk
- Succeeded by: Eugene Shirk

Personal details
- Born: Victor Robert Hewlett Yarnell; October 5, 1919 Montreal, Quebec, Canada
- Died: January 22, 2015 (aged 95) Reading, Pennsylvania, United States
- Party: Democratic
- Education: Bedford Modern School; Albright College; University of Pennsylvania

Victor Robert Hewlett Yarnell (October 5, 1919 – January 22, 2015) was a Canadian-born American politician who served as the Mayor of Reading, Pennsylvania, as a Democrat between 1968 and 1972.

== Life ==
Yarnell was born on October 5, 1919, in Montreal, Quebec, Canada to an Irish father and an English mother. He was educated in England as a boarder at Bedford Modern School after which he served in the British Army throughout World War II seeing action in Dunkirk and taking part in the Normandy landings. After the war, Yarnell moved to the United States attending Albright College and later graduating M.A. from the University of Pennsylvania.

For the following twelve years Yarnell taught government at Muhlenberg High School until his election as a Democrat to the Pennsylvania House of Representatives in the 1963 session although deciding not to seek reelection to the House in 1964. In 1968, Yarnell was elected 41st Mayor of Reading, Pennsylvania, an office he held until 1972. Thereafter he continued community work in Reading as director of the Schuylkill River Green Association (1979-1997) and as a member of the board of trustees of Reading Area Community College.

Yarnell died in Reading, Pennsylvania, on January 22, 2015. He was survived by his wife, Nancy, and a son.
