= Tom McMahon (mayor) =

American mayor

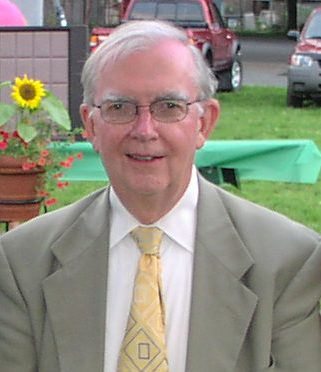

Mayor of Reading, Pennsylvania
- In office January 5, 2004 – January 2, 2012
- Preceded by: Joseph Eppihimer
- Succeeded by: Vaughn Spencer

Personal details
- Born: Rochester, New York
- Party: Democratic

Thomas M. McMahon was the Mayor of Reading, Pennsylvania from January 5, 2004 to January 2, 2012.

McMahon was re-elected mayor in November 2007 for a second four-year term, with 5,847 votes, or 66.5%. He served as mayor until January 2012. McMahon declined to run for a third term.

== Biography ==
McMahon was born in Rochester, New York. He graduated from the Rochester Institute of Technology with a bachelor's degree in engineering. McMahon then obtained a master's degree in engineering with a minor in political science from Pennsylvania State University. He taught in Bangladesh with the Peace Corps.

McMahon moved to Reading, Pennsylvania, in 1965 and was employed with Gilbert Associates until 1980. He then founded his own engineering firm, Entech Engineering.

McMahon has three daughters, Anne-Marie, Christina, and Rebecca.

== Political stances ==
On July 16, 2006 Mayor McMahon, while attending the 3rd annual International Latin Festival at Reading's City Park, voiced his disapproval of a recent law enacted by the city of Hazelton. The Hazleton law, which allows for a fine of $1,000 if a home is rented to illegal aliens, as well as making English the official language of the city, is according to McMahon not required. He stated that "Reading is proud to hear Spanish spoken in public" and "Aren't you glad this isn't Hazleton?" McMahon observes that "It's a slippery slope for local municipalities to pass laws that are already in place and the feds aren't enforcing".

On August 17, 2006, McMahon made a controversial comment regarding the reason for the construction of The Goggle Works not being for suburban folk and cocktail parties. A couple of days later in a letter to the Reading Eagle, he apologized for the remarks.

McMahon is a member of the Mayors Against Illegal Guns Coalition as of October 2006., a bi-partisan group with a stated goal of "making the public safer by getting illegal guns off the streets." The Coalition was co-chaired by Boston Mayor Thomas Menino and New York City Mayor Michael Bloomberg.

== Major systems grant program ==
On July 25, 2006 Mayor Tom McMahon announced the awarding of the first grant in the City of Reading's in City Hall. The program, a joint venture between the City of Reading's Community Development Department and the Berks County Office of Aging provides grants to senior citizens who are residents and homeowners who are having difficulty providing new major systems for their properties. Major systems are defined as roofing, plumbing and heating systems, chimney repairs, and upgraded electrical systems at the source.

The first award has been given in the amount of $2200.00 to a local senior homeowner who had a major plumbing issue. Barbara Coffin, Executive Director of the Berks County Office of Aging stated that "I am delighted that the Office of Aging has been invited to be the conduit for the City's Major System Grant Program. It is a benefit to be able to provide much needed assistance to our seniors in the community when a major systems failure happens in their housing that they cannot afford." The Agency has recently had forty two applications to the program and Coffin is pleased to see that the program is moving and that eligible applicants are now benefiting.

The Major Systems Grant is a conditional grant program which is reduced yearly by owner residency in the property for a period of ten years. To be eligible for the MSGP, one must be 65 or older, own and reside in their home. Taxes must be up to date and home insurance must be verifiable.

This was a recommendation which came out of the Mayor's Task Force on Housing to continue the Administration's goal to improve housing stock in the City of Reading. "The Major Systems Grant Program is yet another way to enhance and improve the quality of life for our residents and I am pleased that the Community Development team is continuing their dedication to our seniors with this program."

== Technology use ==
Mayor Tom McMahon has what he considers to be a big vision for Reading, including ubiquitous wifi, Internet at the Pagoda.

Mr. McMahon shared some elements of this vision on Berks TV during the first of a 2 part series. A blogger himself, Mr. McMahon also talked about his blog-reading habits and how he uses the Internet for research as part of his job as mayor. He also says he will watch the occasional news video via the web.

== Video surveillance ==
On March 9, 2007, Mayor Tom McMahon discussed how installing video surveillance in downtown could curb crime during his broadcast on From WEEU's monthly series "Ask the Mayor" on "Feedback" with Mike Faust.

== Vehicle theft prevention initiative ==
Mayor McMahon organized a Greater Reading VIN etching event on Saturday, May 19, 2007 at the Fairgrounds Square Mall, just north of Reading. Vehicle thefts have been a problem in the Reading area and this program is designed to help prevent vehicle theft by permanently etching the Vehicle Identification Number on the window glass, making the car harder to sell if stolen. A decal program was also carried out, called HEAT (Help Eliminate Auto Theft) where the vehicle owner gives permission for any law enforcement officer to stop the vehicle and ask for driver identification if it is on the road between the hours of 1:00 am to 5:00 am.

== Sewer fund controversy ==
On May 18, 2010, Mayor Tom McMahon became the center of attention involving a controversy where his administration transferred $11.0 Million Dollars from the public sewer fund to the general fund, an apparent violation of a consent decree with the U.S. Department of Justice limiting such transfers to no more than $3 million annually. McMahon has consistently denied advance knowledge of the transfer. A subsequent investigation by city council resulted in no information challenging McMahon's position.
