= Norton Lichtenwalner =

American politician

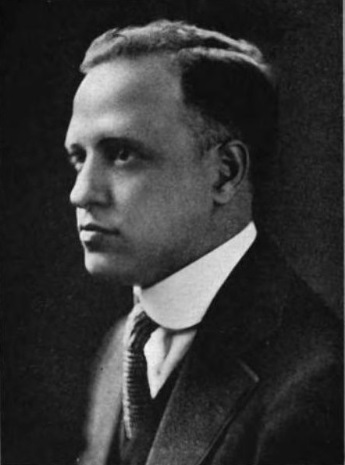
From 1917's Men of Allentown

Norton Lewis Lichtenwalner (June 1, 1889 – May 3, 1960) was a Democratic member of the U.S. House of Representatives from Pennsylvania.

== Early life and education ==
Norton L. Lichtenwalner was born in Allentown, Pennsylvania, to Fred H. and Jennie (Seiple) Lichtenwalner. He graduated from Allentown High School (now known as William Allen High School) in 1905 and Bethlehem Preparatory School in 1906. He attended Lehigh University in Bethlehem, Pennsylvania.

== Career ==
In 1908, Lichtenwalner moved to New York City, where he was employed by E. Naumburg & Co., a banking company. He returned to Allentown in 1915, where he worked in the retail furniture business until 1922, and then in automobile retail industry until 1933. During World War I, Lichtenwalner enlisted as a seaman in the U.S. Navy Reserve.

Lichtenwalner was elected as a Democrat to the Seventy-second Congress. He lost his reelection bid in 1932 and then became State director for the Pennsylvania National Emergency Council from 1935 to 1941 and State director of Office of Government Reports in 1941 and 1942. In 1949, he was elected to the Allentown City Council, where he served for one term. In 1955, he was elected treasurer of Lehigh County, Pennsylvania, for one term.

== Death ==
He died in Allentown on May 3, 1960 and is buried in Fairview Cemetery in Allentown.

== Sources ==
- United States Congress. "Norton L. Lichtenwalner (id: L000300)". Biographical Directory of the United States Congress.

U.S. House of Representatives
Preceded by Charles J. Esterly	Member of the U.S. House of Representatives from Pennsylvania's 14th congressional district 1931–1933	Succeeded by William E. Richardson
