= Peter Filbert =

American politician (1793–1864)

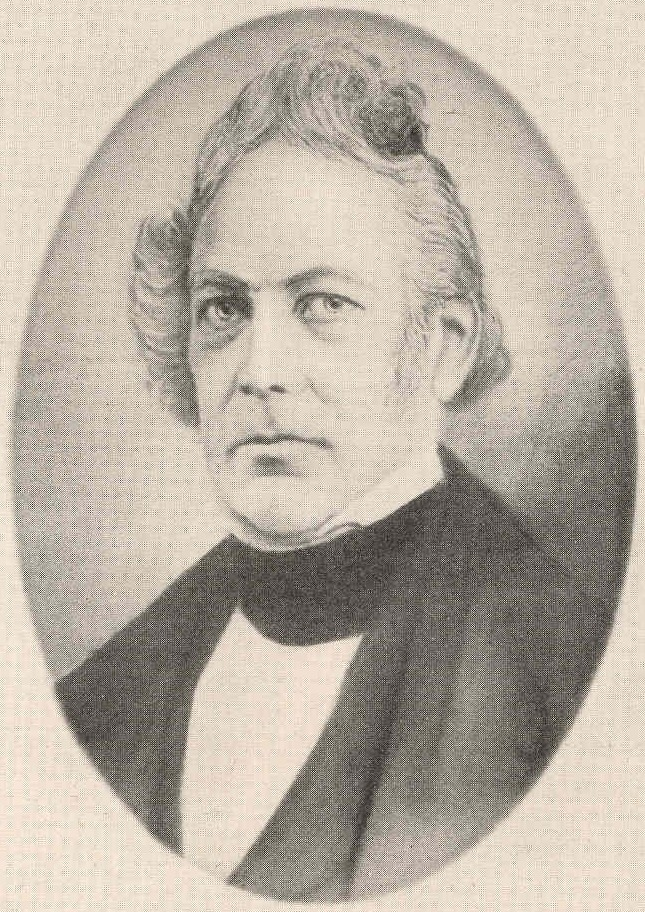
- Peter Filbert

1st Mayor of Reading, Pennsylvania
- In office 1847–1848
- Succeeded by: William H. Keim

Personal details
- Born: 1793 Reading, Pennsylvania, U.S.
- Died: May 28, 1864 (aged 70–71)
- Resting place: Charles Evans Cemetery

Peter Filbert (c. 1793 – May 28, 1864) was the first mayor of the city of Reading, Pennsylvania.

He was born in Reading in about 1793. He was the son of Peter Filbert, who was Sheriff of Berks County from 1785 to 1787. Filbert was a lawyer, being admitted to practice at Reading, January 6, 1831. In 1840 he represented Berks County in the State Legislature. He filled the position of Chief Burgess of Reading for several years until its incorporation as a city in 1847, when he was elected Mayor, holding this post for one year. While serving as Mayor he was appointed District Deputy Attorney General for Berks County. He died May 28, 1864, at the age of 71. He was buried in Charles Evans Cemetery.
