= Charles J. Esterly =

American politician (1888–1940)

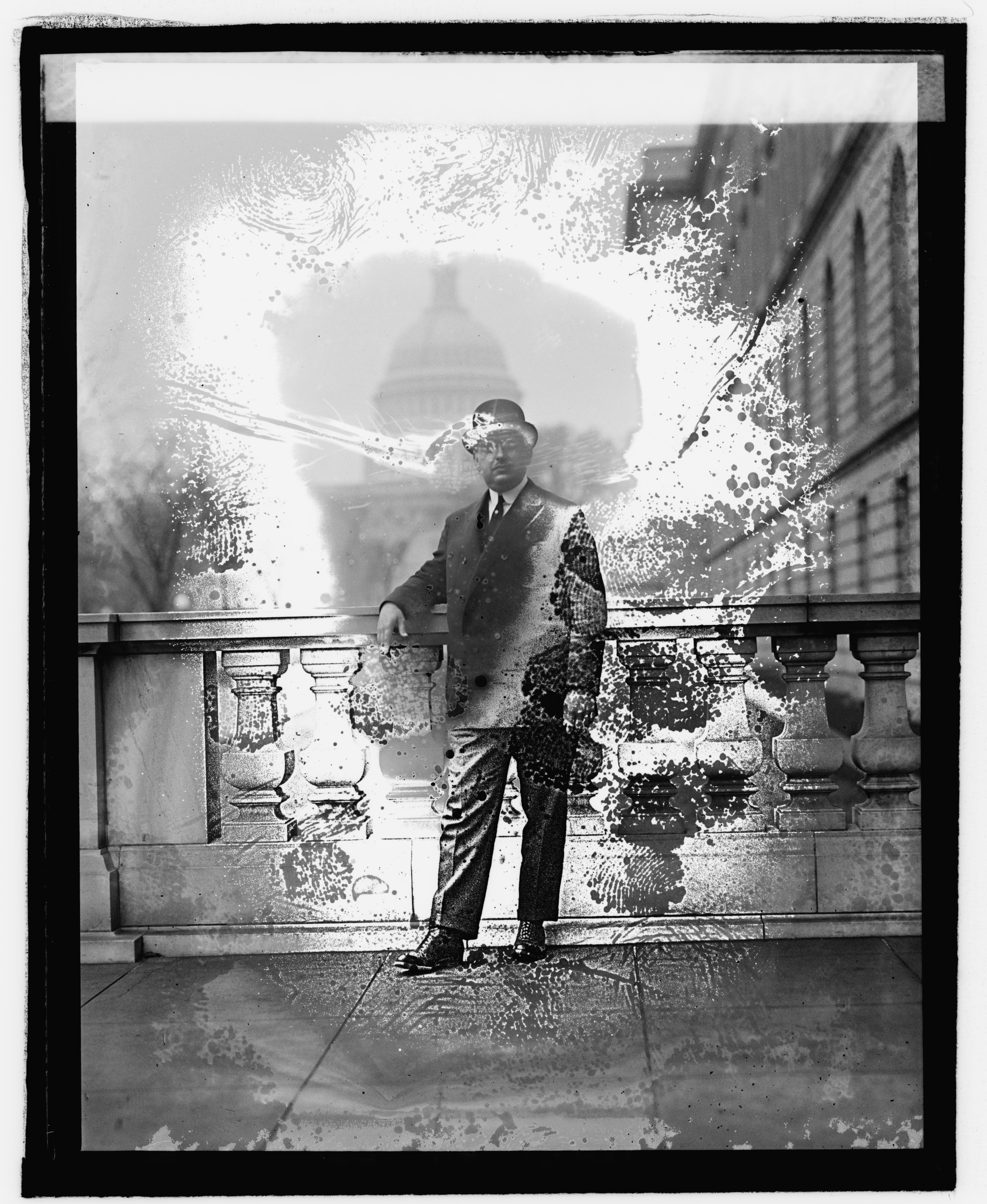

Member of the U.S. House of Representatives from Pennsylvania's 14th district
- In office March 4, 1929 – March 3, 1931
- Preceded by: Robert Grey Bushong
- Succeeded by: Norton Lewis Lichtenwalner
- In office March 4, 1925 – March 4, 1927
- Preceded by: William Martin Croll
- Succeeded by: Robert Grey Bushong

Personal details
- Born: Charles Joseph Esterly; February 8, 1888 Reading, Pennsylvania, U.S.
- Died: September 3, 1940 (aged 52) Wernersville, Pennsylvania, U.S.
- Resting place: Charles Evans Cemetery
- Party: Republican

Charles Joseph Esterly (February 8, 1888 – September 3, 1940) was a Republican member of the U.S. House of Representatives from Pennsylvania.

== Biography ==
Charles J. Esterly was born in Reading, Pennsylvania. He was employed with an electric company until 1916 and later in the sales department of a knitting mill. He was also engaged in the breeding of Ayrshire cattle and Berkshire hogs. He served as president and director of a water company, and as a director of a knitting mill and bottle-stopper company. He was a member of the board of school directors of Wyomissing, Pennsylvania, from 1914 to 1920, and a committeeman of Wyomissing Borough from 1917 to 1921. He was a delegate to the Republican National Convention in 1920, and a member of the Republican State committee from 1922 to 1924.

=== Congress ===
Esterly was elected as a Republican to the Sixty-ninth Congress. He declined to be a candidate for renomination in 1926. He was again elected to the Seventy-first Congress, but was not a candidate for renomination in 1930.

=== Later career and death ===
He resumed former business interests, and died in Wernersville, Pennsylvania. Interment in Charles Evans Cemetery in Reading.

== Sources ==
- United States Congress. "Charles J. Esterly (id: E000222)". Biographical Directory of the United States Congress.
- The Political Graveyard

U.S. House of Representatives
| Preceded by William Martin Croll | Member of the U.S. House of Representatives from Pennsylvania's 14th congressional district 1925–1927 | Succeeded by Robert Grey Bushong |
| Preceded by Robert Grey Bushong | Member of the U.S. House of Representatives from Pennsylvania's 14th congressional district 1929–1931 | Succeeded by Norton Lewis Lichtenwalner |
