= J. Henry Stump =

American politician

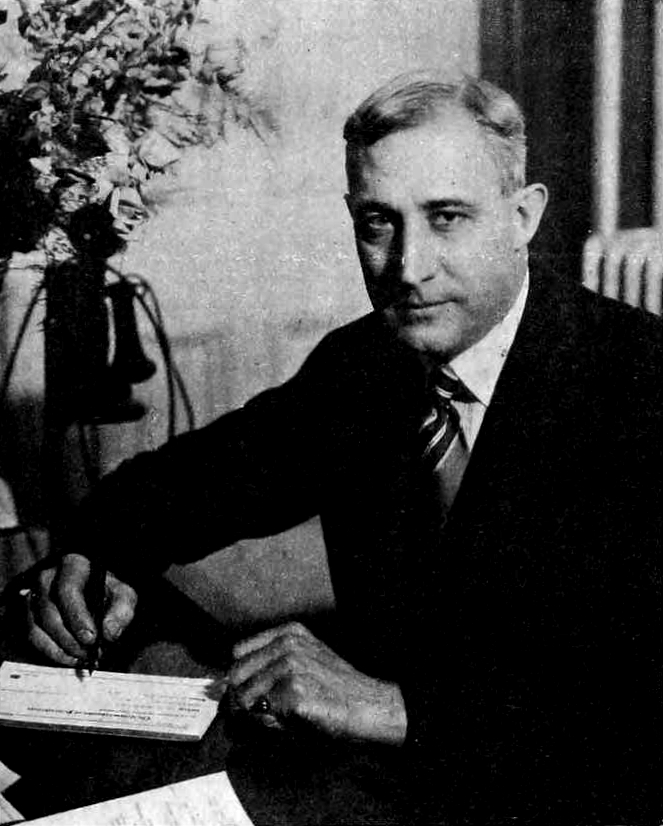
- Stump c. 1939

Mayor of Reading, Pennsylvania
- In office January 3, 1944 – January 5, 1948
- Preceded by: Harry F. Menges
- Succeeded by: John F. Davis
- In office January 6, 1936 – January 1, 1940
- Preceded by: Heber Ermentrout
- Succeeded by: Harry F. Menges
- In office January 3, 1927 – January 4, 1931
- Preceded by: William E. Sharman
- Succeeded by: Heber Ermentrout

Personal details
- Born: John Henry Stump; June 4, 1880
- Died: May 15, 1949 (aged 68)
- Party: Socialist (until 1936); Social Democratic Federation (after 1936)

John Henry Stump (June 4, 1880 – May 15, 1949) was an American cigar maker, labor advocate, and Socialist politician who served as Mayor of Reading, Pennsylvania.

== Biography ==
John Henry Stump was born June 4, 1880, in Reading, Pennsylvania. He ended his education at the age of thirteen, as his father was in ill health and he needed to provide for the family. He was briefly apprenticed to a cigar maker, and worked in that industry throughout his life.

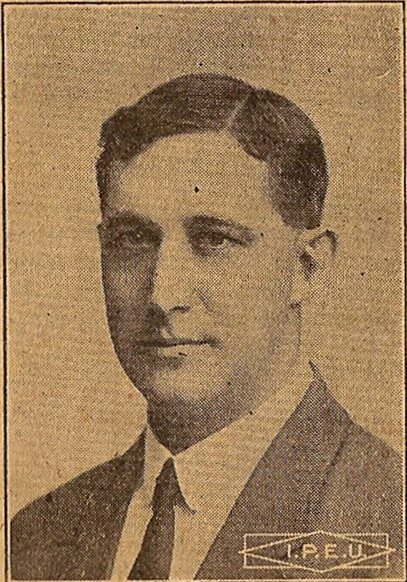
Stump c. 1917

Stump joined the Socialist Party's local organization in 1902, and in 1918 became the business manager of the Labor Advocate, a weekly newspaper published by the Socialist Party of Berks County. He was the Socialist candidate for Reading City Council in 1911 and Mayor in 1919 and 1923. In 1927, Stump was elected mayor, with James H. Maurer and another socialist serving alongside him as city councilmen. This was significant, as Reading became one of the few cities with a majority socialist government. Stump was defeated in his reelection, but regained his office in 1935 and again in 1943.

== Split with Socialist Party ==
Stump left the Socialist Party of America following the Old Guard faction's split and helped form the Social Democratic Federation in 1936. He served as vice-chair of the SDF along with John Shenton of Connecticut.

At the SDF's founding convention in 1937, Stump spoke critically of his former party, stating:

We came here because we could no longer square our Socialist conscience with remaining in the party which has fallen into the hands of disruptors, of people who do not believe in the idea and ideals of democratic Socialism. I am confident that at this convention we will build an organization that will truly represent these ideas.

== See also ==
- List of elected socialist mayors in the United States
- Mayor of Reading, Pennsylvania
