= Robert G. Bushong =

American politician (1883–1951)

Robert Grey Bushong
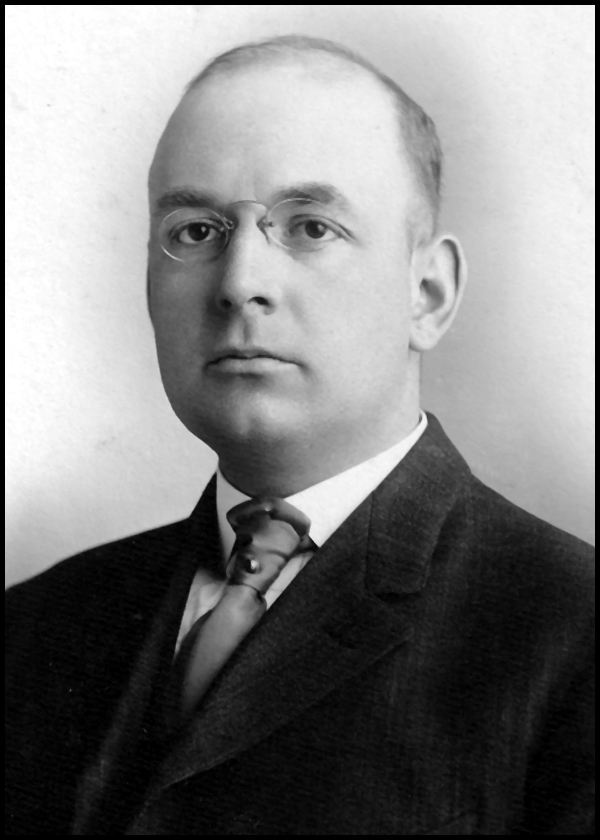

Member of the U.S. House of Representatives from Pennsylvania's 14th district
- In office March 4, 1927 – March 3, 1929
- Preceded by: Charles J. Esterly
- Succeeded by: Charles J. Esterly

Member of the Pennsylvania House of Representatives
- In office 1908-1909

Personal details
- Born: June 10, 1883 Reading, Pennsylvania, U.S.
- Died: April 6, 1951 (aged 67) Reading, Pennsylvania, U.S.
- Resting place: Charles Evans Cemetery
- Party: Republican

Robert Grey Bushong Tombstone

Robert Grey Bushong (June 10, 1883 – April 6, 1951) was a Republican member of the U.S. House of Representatives from Pennsylvania.

Robert G. Bushong was born in Reading, Pennsylvania. He was the son of Jacob and Lillie (Roberts) Bushong and the grandson of Anthony Ellmaker Roberts. He attended Phillips Academy in Andover, Massachusetts. He graduated from Yale University in 1903 and from the law school of Columbia University, New York City, in 1906. He was admitted to the bar in 1906 and commenced practice in Reading. He served as a member of the Pennsylvania State House of Representatives in 1908 and 1909. He was the president judge of the orphans' court of Berks County, Pennsylvania, in 1914 and 1915. He was a delegate to the Republican National Conventions in 1916 and 1924.

Bushong was elected as a Republican to the Seventieth Congress, and was not a candidate for renomination in 1928. He resumed the practice of law in Reading and resided in Sinking Spring, Pennsylvania. He died in Reading. Interment in Reading's Charles Evans Cemetery.

== Sources ==
- United States Congress. "Robert G. Bushong (id: B001171)". Biographical Directory of the United States Congress.
- The Political Graveyard
- "Robert G. Bushong." New York Times. 7 Apr 1951, 12.

U.S. House of Representatives
Preceded by Charles J. Esterly	Member of the U.S. House of Representatives from Pennsylvania's 14th congressional district 1927–1929	Succeeded by Charles J. Esterly
