= William L. Graul =

Union Army soldier (1846–1909)

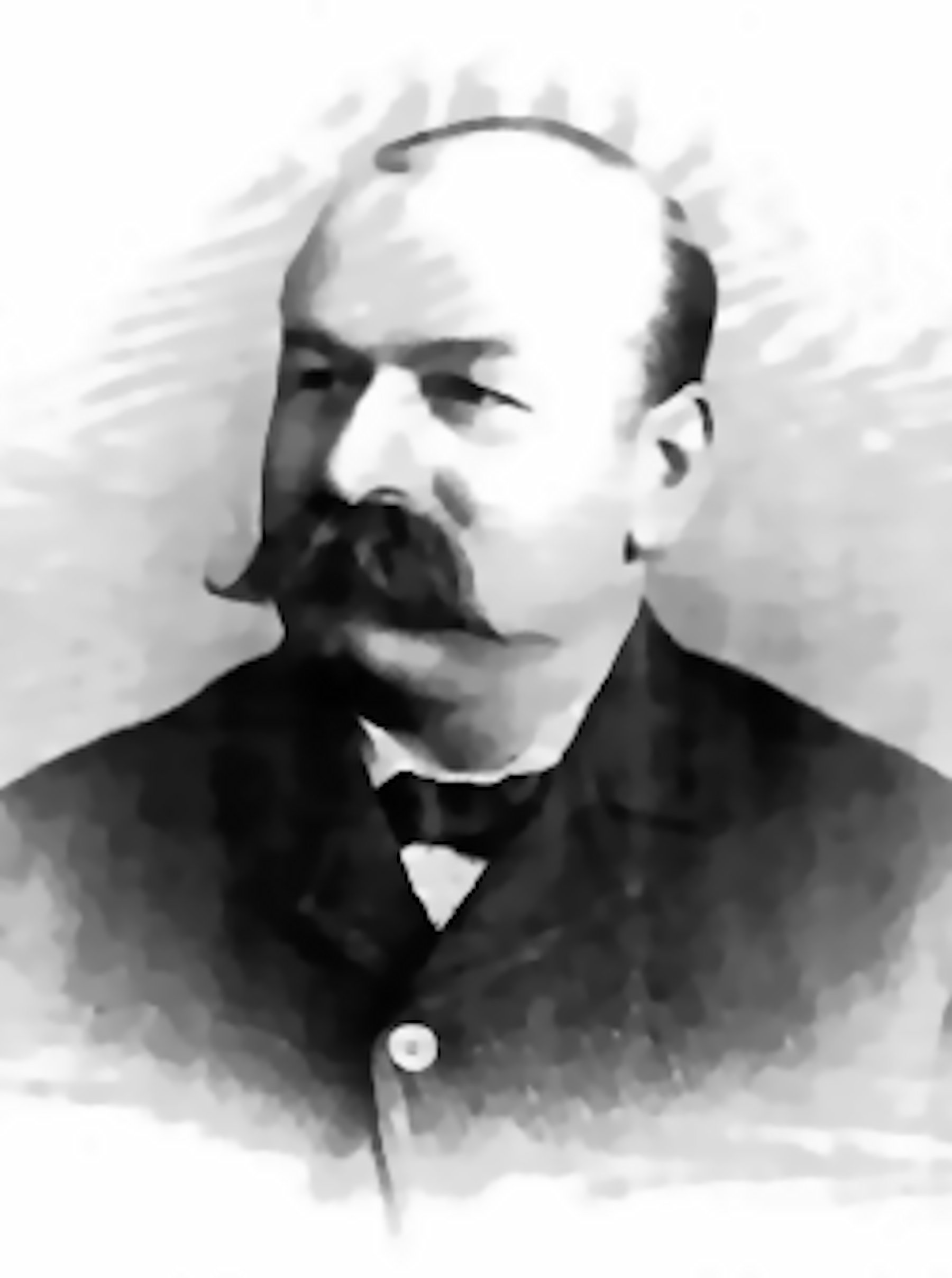
- Medal of Honor winner William L Graul
- Born: July 27, 1846; Reading, Pennsylvania, U.S.
- Died: September 2, 1909 (aged 63); Pennsylvania, U.S.
- Burial place: Charles Evans Cemetery
- Military career
- Allegiance: Union Army
- Branch: Infantry
- Rank: Corporal
- Units: Company I, 188th Pennsylvania Volunteer Infantry Regiment
- Conflicts: American Civil War; Battle of Chaffin's Farm
- Awards: Medal of Honor

William L. Graul (July 27, 1846 – September 2, 1909) was a Union Army soldier in the American Civil War who received the U.S. military's highest decoration, the Medal of Honor.

== Formative years ==
Graul was born on July 27, 1846, in Reading, Pennsylvania, where he was educated in the local schools.

== American Civil War ==
Graul enrolled for military service during the American Civil War in Reading, Pennsylvania. At the age of eighteen, he was awarded the Medal of Honor, for extraordinary heroism shown at Fort Harrison during the Battle of Chaffin's Farm.

His act of valor was committed while placing the American flag on the Confederate Army fortifications, while serving as a corporal with Company I of the 188th Pennsylvania Volunteer Infantry.

The flag of Graul's regiment, the 188th Pennsylvania Infantry, was carried by Cecil Clay, for which Clay was also awarded a Medal of Honor.

Graul's Medal of Honor was issued on April 6, 1865.

== Post-war life ==
Following the war, Graul returned home and resumed his family life. He had five children. He died along with his wife on September 2, 1909, after a train collided with their touring car in Pennsylvania. He was buried in Charles Evans Cemetery.

== Medal of Honor citation ==
The President of the United States of America, in the name of Congress, takes pleasure in presenting the Medal of Honor to Corporal William L. Graul, United States Army, for extraordinary heroism on 29 September 1864, while serving with Company I, 188th Pennsylvania Infantry, in action at Fort Harrison, Virginia. Corporal Graul was first to plant the colors of his State on the fortifications.
