= John Ritter (politician) =

American politician (1779–1851)

John Ritter (February 6, 1779 – November 24, 1851) was a Democratic member of the U.S. House of Representatives from Pennsylvania.

John Ritter was born in Exeter, Pennsylvania. He received a limited schooling and apprenticed as a printer. He was a member of the State constitutional convention in 1836.

Ritter was elected as a Democrat to the Twenty-eighth and Twenty-ninth Congresses. He was not a candidate for renomination in 1846. He served as editor and publisher of the Adler, a German newspaper, at Reading, Pennsylvania. He died in Reading in 1851. Interment in Reading's Charles Evans Cemetery.

== Sources ==
- United States Congress. "John Ritter (id: R000278)". Biographical Directory of the United States Congress.
- The Political Graveyard

U.S. House of Representatives
Preceded by George May Keim	Member of the U.S. House of Representatives from Pennsylvania's 9th congressional district 1843–1847	Succeeded by William Strong
