= Canada Bill Jones =

Romani-American con artist (c. 1837 – 1877)

"Canada Bill" Jones
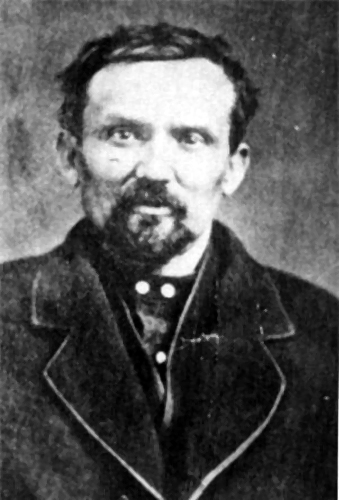
- Born: William Jones c. 1837; Yorkshire, England
- Died: October 22, 1877; Reading, Pennsylvania, U.S.
- Burial place: Charles Evans Cemetery; Reading, Pennsylvania, U.S.
- Occupation: Riverboat gambler
- Known for: Three-card monte skills

William "Canada Bill" Jones (c. 1837 – 1877) was an English-born Romanichal confidence artist, riverboat gambler and card sharp in Canada and the United States. He has been described by historians, news reporters and others who have written about his life since the late 19th century with such superlatives as "the greatest of confidence men" and "without doubt the greatest three-card-monte sharp ever to work the boats, perhaps the greatest of them all."

== Life ==
Born in a Romanichal tent in Yorkshire, England, Jones learned the techniques of his future trade at a young age, and honed his skills into his late teenage years. In 1860, he emigrated to Canada, where he learned and perfected his three-card monte skills while travelling with Dick Cady as a "thrower". Heading south to the United States, he found success as a Mississippi riverboat gambler, teaming up with George Devol, Holly Chappell and Tom Brown. Brown's share alone was reportedly $240,000. After the foursome broke up, Jones and Devol continued working the boats until the pair severed their relationship sometime around the outbreak of the American Civil War when both accused each other of cheating.

Several people who knew Jones personally reported that he was generally a kind and charitable man. A detective described him "as gentle as a woman and as cunning as a fox" and "could beat any man at his own game", adding that Jones liked to "snake in" the greenhorns. Devol stated that he once witnessed Jones hand $50 to a Sister of Charity he passed on the street. According to Allan Pinkerton, founder of America's Pinkerton National Detective Agency:

[Jones'] personal appearance, which was most ludicrous, undeniably had much to do with his success. He was the veritable country gawky, the ridiculous, ignorant, absurd creature that has been so imperfectly imitated on and off the stage for years, and whose true description can scarcely be written. He was fully six feet high, with dark eyes and hair, and always had a smooth-shaven face, full of seams and wrinkles, that were put to all manner of difficult expressions with a marvelous facility and ease. All this coupled with long, loose-jointed arms, long, thin, and apparently a trifle unsteady legs, a shambling, shuffling, awkward gait, and this remarkable face and head bent forward and turned a little to one side, like an inquiring and wise owl, and then an outfit of Granger clothing, the entire cost of which never exceeded fifteen dollars—made a combination that never failed to call a smile to a stranger’s face, or awaken a feeling of curiosity and interest wherever he might be seen. One striking difference between Canada Bill and all the other sharpers of his ilk lay in the fact that he was the thing he seemed to be…. [T]hose who knew him, as far as it was possible to know the wandering vagabond that he was, assert that he was the most unaffected, innocent, and really simple-hearted of human beings.

Post-war, Jones moved to Kansas City, where he partnered with "Dutch Charlie". After winning $200,000 there, they began working the Omaha, Nebraska to Kansas City trains until the Union Pacific Railroad management started clamping down on three-card monte players. In response, Jones wrote to the general superintendent of the railroad, offering $10,000 a year to secure an exclusive franchise while other accounts reported that he offered Union Pacific's officers $1000 a month or $30,000 a year if they would let him play monte on their trains, but those offers were rebuffed.

Jones moved on to Chicago, in 1874, teaming up with Jimmy Porter and "Colonel" Charlie Starr. While there, he opened and worked four gambling houses, all reportedly with criminal histories. Winning and losing as much as $150,000 in a year, he reportedly was often duped by other gamblers during short card cons. Moving on to Cleveland with Porter, he continued to lose to professionals there as fast as he won from his marks.

After relocating to Berks County, Pennsylvania in 1877, Jones fell ill with consumption (tuberculosis). A pauper, he was admitted to the charity hospital in Reading, Pennsylvania for treatment. Roughly 40 years old at the time of his death there on October 22, 1877, he was buried at Reading's Charles Evans Cemetery. Reading's mayor was later reimbursed for the funeral by the gamblers of Chicago. John Quinn wrote in Fools of Fortune that:

... as the coffin was being lowered into the grave, one of his friends offered to bet $1,000 to $500 that 'Bill was not in the box.' The offer found no takers, for the reason, as one of his acquaintances said, 'that he had known Bill to squeeze through tighter holes than that'.

== In popular culture ==
The German writer Karl May wrote two stories about Canada Bill Jones: Ein Self-man (1878) and Three carde monte (1879). The narrator meets several times with the young Abraham Lincoln and together they oppose "Kanada-Bill." Later on, May revised the latter story for integration in Old Surehand II (1895), adding a fictional cause of death.

In the 1998 poker film Rounders, the main character, played by Matt Damon, quotes Canada Bill Jones, saying "It's immoral to let a sucker keep his money."

In Neil Gaiman's 2001 novel American Gods, Mr. Wednesday tells the "it's the only game in town" story about Canada Bill Jones, calling it the finest line of poetry ever spoken in America.
