= George M. Keim =

American politician (1805–1861)

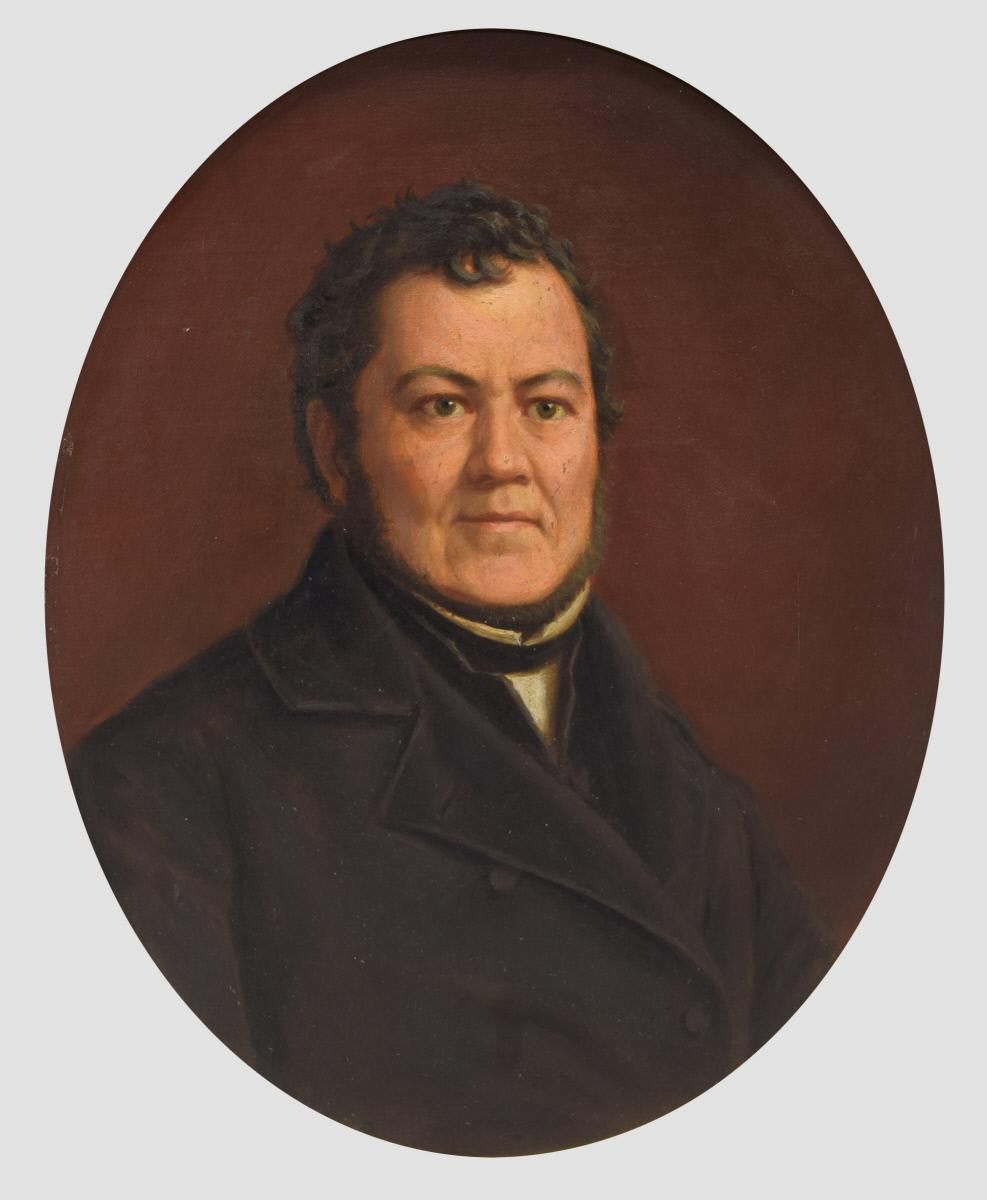

Member of the U.S. House of Representatives from Pennsylvania's 9th district
- In office March 17, 1838 – March 3, 1843
- Preceded by: Henry A. P. Muhlenberg
- Succeeded by: John Ritter

Personal details
- Born: George May Keon; March 23, 1805 Reading, Pennsylvania, U.S.
- Died: June 10, 1861 (aged 56) Reading, Pennsylvania, U.S.
- Resting place: Charles Evans Cemetery
- Party: Democratic
- Relatives: William High Keim (nephew)
- Education: Princeton University

George May Keim (March 23, 1805 – June 10, 1861) was a 19th-century American lawyer and politician who for three terms was a Democratic member of the U.S. House of Representatives from Pennsylvania from 1838 to 1843.

== Biography ==
George May Keim (uncle of William High Keim) was born in Reading, Pennsylvania. He attended Princeton College, studied law, was admitted to the bar in 1826 and commenced practice in Reading.

He was a major general of militia and also served as a delegate to the State constitutional convention of 1837 and 1838.

=== Congress ===
Keim was elected as a Democrat to the Twenty-fifth Congress to fill the vacancy caused by the resignation of Henry A. P. Muhlenberg. He was reelected to the Twenty-sixth and Twenty-seventh Congresses. He was the chairman of the United States House Committee on Militia during the Twenty-sixth and Twenty-seventh Congresses.

=== Tyler and Polk administrations ===
He was appointed by President John Tyler as United States marshal for the United States District Court for the Eastern District of Pennsylvania on December 18, 1843. He was reappointed by President James K. Polk on January 3, 1848, and served until 1850.

=== Later career ===
He was mayor of Reading in 1852, and was a presidential elector on the Democratic ticket of Stephen A. Douglas and Herschel V. Johnson in 1860.

=== Death and burial ===
He died in Reading in 1861. Interment Reading's Charles Evans Cemetery.

== Sources ==
- United States Congress. "George M. Keim (id: K000050)". Biographical Directory of the United States Congress.
- The Political Graveyard

U.S. House of Representatives
Preceded by Henry A. P. Muhlenberg	Member of the U.S. House of Representatives from Pennsylvania's 9th congressional district 1838–1843	Succeeded by John Ritter
