= Three-card monte =

Playing card scam

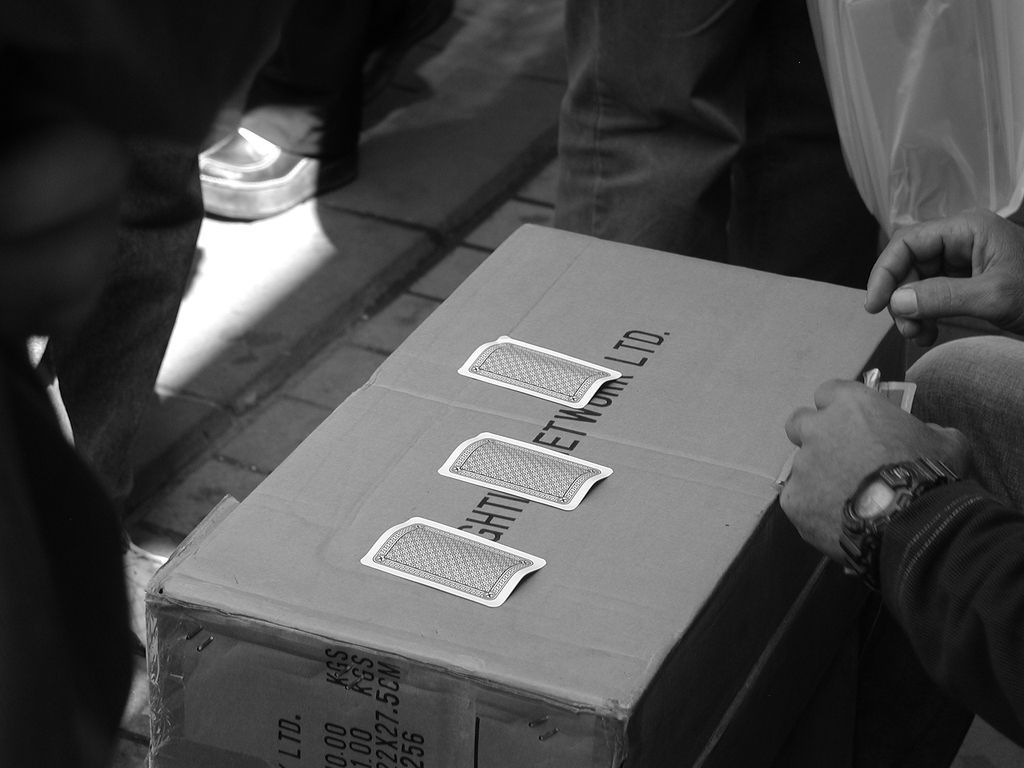
- A game in Jaffa, Tel Aviv, Israel (2005). It has all the hallmarks of the con; the cards are slightly curved, the corners have been bent and the dealer has the cash in hand to conceal any sleight-of-hand.
- Origin: Spanish
- Type: Gambling
- Players: Np.
- Skills: Chance
- Cards: 3
- Deck: Any deck
- Playing time: 5–10 min
- Chance: Easy

Related games
- Monte Bank

Three-card monte – also known as find the lady and three-card trick – is a confidence game in which the victims, or "marks", are tricked into betting a sum of money on the assumption that they can find the "money card" among three face-down playing cards. It is very similar to the shell game except that cards are used instead of shells.

In its full form, three-card monte is an example of a classic "short con" in which a shill pretends to conspire with the mark to cheat the dealer, while in fact doing the reverse. The mark has no chance whatsoever of winning at any point in the game. In fact, anyone who is observed winning anything in the game can be presumed to be a shill.

This confidence trick was already in use by the turn of the 15th century.

== Rules ==
To play three-card monte, a dealer places three cards face down on a table, usually on a cardboard box that provides the ability to set up and disappear quickly. The dealer shows that one of the cards is the target card, e.g., the Queen of hearts, and then rearranges the cards quickly to confuse the player about which card is which. The player is then given an opportunity to select one of the three cards. If the player correctly identifies the target card, the player gets the amount bet (the "stake") back, plus the same amount again; otherwise, the stake is lost.

== Drawing a player in ==
When the mark arrives at the three-card monte game, it is likely that a number of other players will be seen winning and losing money at the game. The people engaged in playing the game are often shills, confederates of the dealer who pretend to play so as to give the illusion of a straight gambling game.

As the mark watches the game, they are likely to notice that they can follow the queen more easily than the shills seem to be able to, which sets them up to believe that they can win the game.

Eventually, if the mark enters the game, they will be cheated through any number of methods. An example of a simple scheme involves a dealer and two shills:

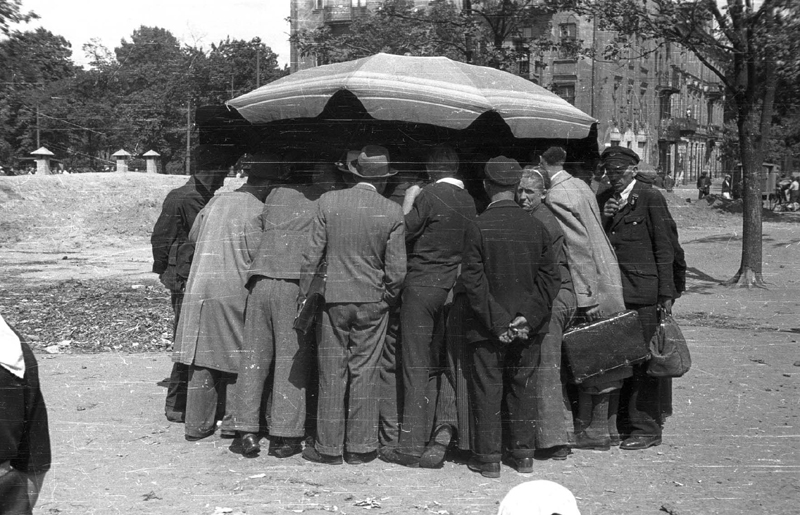
A three-card monte stand in Warsaw, July 1944

- The dealer and shills act as if they do not know each other. The mark will come upon a game being conducted in a seemingly clandestine manner, perhaps with somebody "looking out" for police. The dealer will be engaged in his role, with the first shill betting money. The first shill may be winning, leading the mark to observe that easy money may be had, or losing, leading the mark to observe that they could beat the game and win money where the first shill is losing it.
- While the mark is watching, the second shill, acting as a casual passerby like the mark, will casually engage a mark in conversation regarding the game, commenting on either how easily the first shill is winning or how they are losing money because they cannot win at what appears to the mark to be a simple game. This conversation is engineered to implicitly encourage the mark to play, and it is possible the second shill could resort to outright encouragement.
- If the mark does not enter the game, the dealer may claim to see police and will fold up the operation and restart it elsewhere, or will wait for another mark to appear on the scene.
- If the mark enters the game, they may be "had" (cheated) by a number of techniques. A common belief is that the operator may let the mark win a couple of bets to suck them in, but this is virtually never true. In a true monte scam, the mark will never win a single bet, as it is not necessary. There are too many ways for a mob (a collaborative group of confidence tricksters) to attract the marks, draw them in, and convince them to put money down.
- When the dealer and the shills have taken the mark, a lookout, the dealer, or a shill acting as an observer will claim to have spotted the police. The dealer will quickly pack up the game and disperse along with the shills.

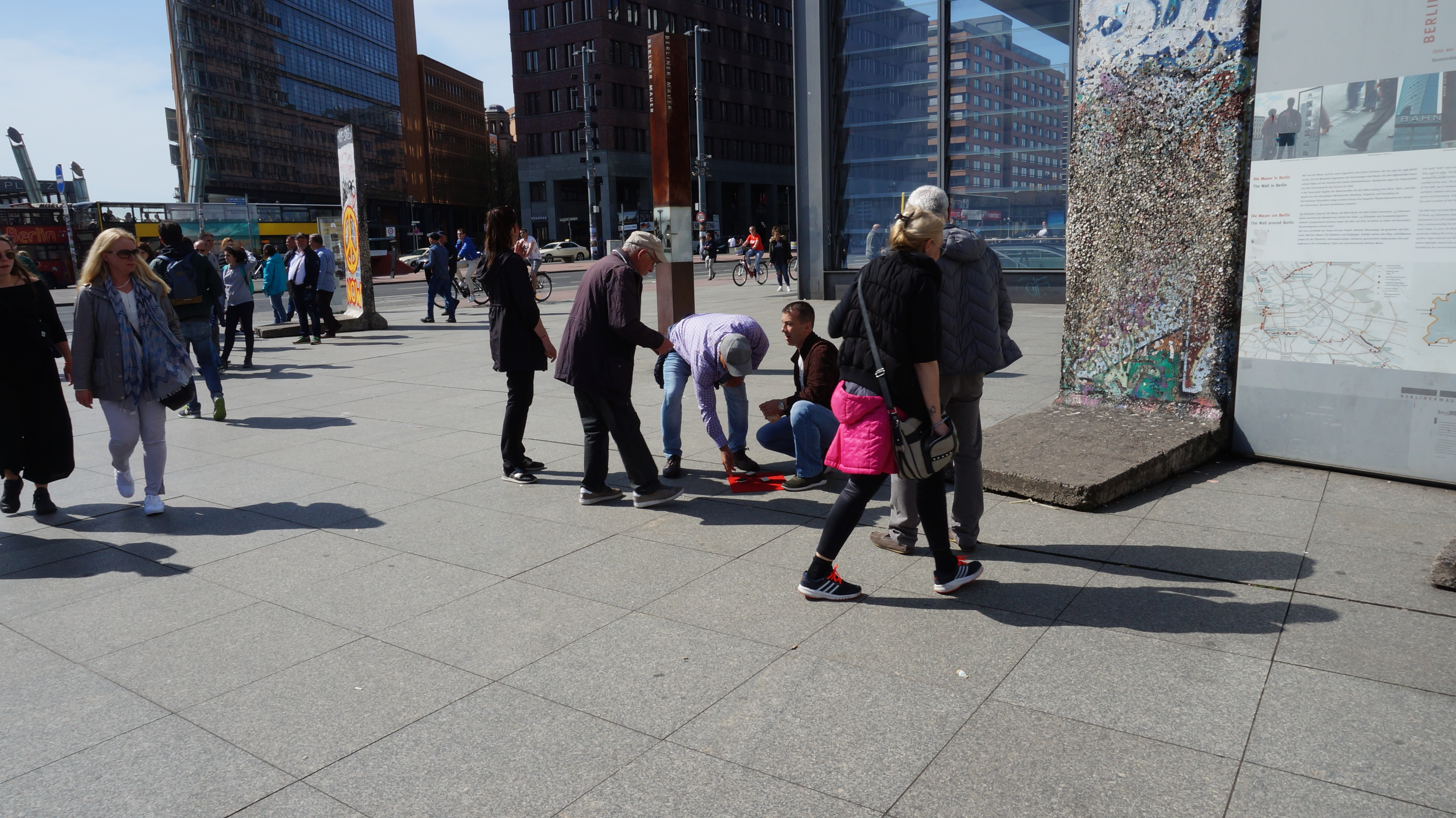
Con artists enticing people on Potsdamer Platz, Berlin, to play, and lose money in the game in 2018.

== Methodology ==
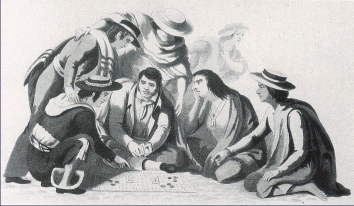
The Game of Monte in the Streets of Mexico by Claudio Linati (1828)

Dealers employ sleight of hand and misdirection to prevent the mark from finding the queen.

Although various moves have been devised for monte, there is one basic move that is overwhelmingly used with virtually all monte games. It has to do with the way the cards are held and tossed to the table. The dealer will pick up one of the cards with one hand, and two with the other. This is the key: although it appears that the dealer is tossing the lowermost card to the table, in actuality they can toss either the top or the bottom card at will. Thus, having done so, and while mixing up the cards, the mark will be following the wrong card from the beginning.

Inevitably, once in a while the mark will manage to find the right location of the card by pure chance. This presents no problem at all for the mob; if the mark picks the right card, one of the shills will simply post a higher bid, which the dealer immediately accepts, announcing that they will accept only the highest bid. In other words, the mark puts down money on the right card, at which point a shill will immediately place a double bet on top of the card, thereby winning the "right" to play that round. Of course, if the mark picks the wrong card, the dealer takes the bid and the money.

The psychology of the con is to increase the mark's confidence until they believe they have a special ability to cheat the dealer and win easy money. Everything the monte mob does is geared towards creating that mindset in the mark. To increase the mark's motivation to bet, they will also employ standard strategies such as having the dealer be slightly abrasive or rude, so there is even more reason to want to take his money.

=== "Bent corner" variation ===
The "bent corner ploy" is one of the classic scams in three-card monte, and is used if the mob thinks a mark can be had for more money, or needs more convincing to put some money down. During the course of tossing the cards, the dealer "accidentally" drops the cards, resulting in a corner of the money card having a slight bend in it. Another variation is for the dealer to look away, and while occupied, one of the shills will quickly put the crimp in the money card. Either way, the dealer pretends not to notice, this perhaps being made more plausible by having the dealer wear thick glasses. Assuming the mark bets on the card with the bent corner, the dealer will tell the mark to turn it over (so there can be no accusations of card-switching), revealing that it is not the money card after all, but one of the loser cards. The dealer has, in the course of tossing the cards, unbent the money card and bent the loser card. In this variation, the mark will be even more reluctant to complain about having lost money, as doing so would reveal that they intended to cheat the dealer.

=== Solo variation ===
A skilled card mechanic can perform this con without shills or assistants. Everything is legitimate up until the reveal. To show that nothing dishonest is being done with the selected card, the dealer does not even touch it, using one of the other cards to turn it over. If a losing card was selected, the card is simply turned over. If the winning card was selected, a "Mexican Turnover" – flipping over a card on the table and replacing it with a card in the hand while doing so – is used to switch the two cards. When done correctly, the two actions are indistinguishable. No matter which card is selected, when turned over it is a losing card.

=== Variation in card magic ===
The three-card monte is performed in card magic tricks with minor or major variations that manipulate the use of gimmick cards, and other sleight-of-hand techniques. Though magicians may attempt to use fast-paced patter to misdirect the audience, some research has shown that to be ineffective.

== Legality in Canada ==
In Canada, under section 206(1) of the Criminal Code, it is illegal to do the following in relation to three-card monte, which is mentioned by name:

- Receive bets
- Induce any person to stake or hazard any money or other valuable property
- Carry on or play or offer to carry on or play in a public place
- Employ any person to carry on or play in a public place
- Allow the game to take place (the owner of the premises)

They are indictable offences, with a maximum penalty of two years in prison.

== History ==
Canada Bill Jones (1837–1877) was considered a master of three-card monte, in the middle of the 19th century in North America.

== Other names ==
In German-speaking countries, the game is known as das Kümmelblättchen. In Turkish, it is known as Bul Karayı Al Parayı 'Find the Black, Get the Money'.
