= 1856–57 United States House of Representatives elections =

House elections for the 35th U.S. Congress

- August 4, 1856 – November 4, 1857 (Note: Excludes states admitted during this Congress)

All 237 seats in the United States House of Representatives 118 seats needed for a majority
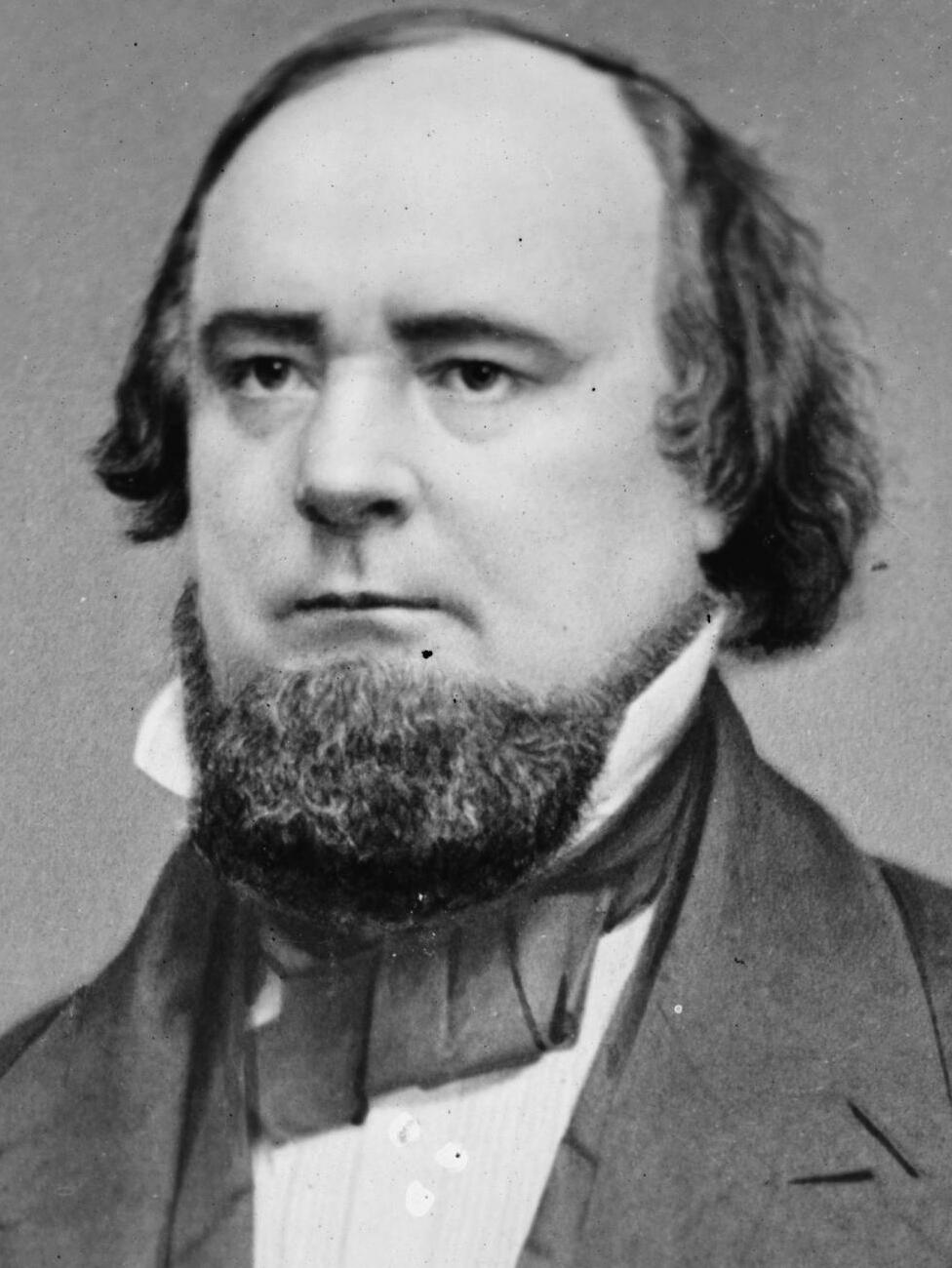

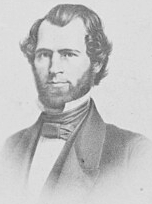
	Majority party	Minority party
Leader	James Orr	Galusha A. Grow
Party	Democratic	Republican
Leader's seat	South Carolina 5th	Pennsylvania 14th
Last election	82 seats, 45.43%	45 seats, 15.63% (Note: Combined result for Anti-Nebraska, Republican, People's, and Free Soil candidates in the last elections.)
Seats won	132	90
Seat change	▲50	▲45
Popular vote	1,804,199	1,420,912
Percentage	46.90%	36.94%
Swing	▲1.47 pp	▲21.31 (Note: In comparison to the performance of the Parties involved in the Opposition Coalition, excluding the Whig Party.) pp
	Third party	Fourth party
Party	Know Nothing	Independent
Last election	52 seats, 19.27%	1 seats (Note: Included one Independent Whig: Anthony Ellmaker Roberts of Pennsylvania.), 1.26%
Seats won	14	1 (Note: Includes one Independent Democrat (a.k.a. a "Benton Democrat"): Francis Preston Blair Jr. of MO-01. Note that while Martis (p. 110) and Dubin (p. 176) list him as an "Independent Democrat" or "Benton Democrat," others sources (e.g. the Biographical Directory of the United States Congress) list Blair as a "Republican".)
Seat change	▼38	Steady
Popular vote	592,737	23,717 (Note: Includes votes for those who ran labeled as an "Independent," "Benton Democrat," "Independent Democrat," or "Independent American.")
Percentage	15.41%	0.62%
Swing	▼3.86 pp	▼0.64 pp
- Results; Democratic gain Democratic hold Republican gain Republican hold Know Nothing gain Know Nothing hold
Speaker before election
Nathaniel Banks
Know Nothing
Elected Speaker
James Orr
Democratic

States held the 1856–57 United States House of Representatives elections between August 4, 1856, and November 4, 1857. Each state, including the pending new state of Minnesota, set a date to elect 236 Representatives to the House before the first session of the 35th United States Congress convened on December 7, 1857.

The elections briefly returned a semblance of normalcy to the Democratic Party, restoring its House majority alongside the election of Democratic President James Buchanan. However, superficial victory masked severe, ultimately irretrievable divisions over slavery. Voters next would return a Democratic House majority only in 1874.

Party realignments continued. In 1856, the Whig Party disbanded, the Know Nothing movement declined, and its vehicle, the American Party, collapsed. Many Northern Whig, American, and other Representatives who opposed the Democrats joined the new, rapidly consolidating Republican Party, whose attitude toward slavery was stridently negative. It was an openly sectional, Northern party which opposed fugitive slave laws and slavery in the territories. Though it did not explicitly demand abolition, for the first time a major party offered a mainstream political platform to outspoken abolitionists.

In March 1857, after almost all Northern states had voted, the Supreme Court issued its infamous Dred Scott decision, amplifying tensions and hardening voter divisions. Remaining elections were concentrated in the South. Southern voters widely drove the American Party from office, rallying to the Democrats in firm opposition to the Republicans.

In October 1857, the pending new state of Minnesota elected its first Representatives. Between the admissions of Vermont in 1791 and Wisconsin in 1848, Congress had admitted new states roughly in pairs: one slave, one free. California was admitted alone as a free state in 1850 only as part of a comprehensive compromise including significant concessions to slave state interests. Admission of Minnesota in May 1858, also alone but with no such deal, helped expose the declining political influence of the South, destroying the formerly binding concept that slave and free state power was best kept in balance even in the Senate while solidifying a sense that the West would exclude slavery.

== Election summaries ==
Two seats were added for the new state of Minnesota, which was unrepresented for part of the 1st session.

↓
133	14	90
Democratic	KN	Republican

State	Type	Date	Total seats	Democratic		Know Nothing		Republican	
State	Type	Date	Total seats	Seats	Change	Seats	Change	Seats	Change (Note: Compared to the 100 Opposition Party members in previous election of 1854.)
Arkansas	District	August 4, 1856	2	2	Steady	0	Steady	0	Steady
Iowa	District	August 4, 1856	2	0	▼1	0	Steady	2	▲1
Missouri	District	August 4, 1856	7	5	▲4	2	▲2	0	▼6
Vermont	District	September 2, 1856	3	0	Steady	0	Steady	3	Steady
Maine	District	September 8, 1856	6	0	▼1	0	Steady	6	▲1
Florida	At-large	October 6, 1856	1	1	Steady	0	Steady	0	Steady
South Carolina	District	October 13–14, 1856	6	6	Steady	0	Steady	0	Steady
Indiana	District	October 14, 1856	11	6	▲4	0	Steady	5	▼4
Ohio	District	October 14, 1856	21	9	▲9	0	Steady	12	▼9
Pennsylvania	District	October 14, 1856	25	15	▲8	0	▼1	10	▼7
California	At-large	November 4, 1856 (Election Day) (Note: In 1845, Congress passed a law providing for a uniform date for choosing presidential electors (see: Statutes at Large, 28th Congress, 2nd Session, p. 721). Congressional elections were unaffected by this law, but the date was gradually adopted by the states for congressional elections as well.)	2	2	Steady	0	Steady	0	Steady
Delaware	At-large	November 4, 1856 (Election Day)	1	1	▲1	0	▼1	0	Steady
Illinois	District	November 4, 1856 (Election Day)	9	5	Steady	0	Steady	4	Steady
Massachusetts	District	November 4, 1856 (Election Day)	11	0	Steady	0	▼11	11	▲11
Michigan	District	November 4, 1856 (Election Day)	4	0	▼1	0	Steady	4	▲1
New Jersey	District	November 4, 1856 (Election Day)	5	3	▲2	0	Steady	2	▼2
New York	District	November 4, 1856 (Election Day)	33	12	▲7	0	▼3	21	▼4
Wisconsin	District	November 4, 1856 (Election Day)	3	0	▼1	0	Steady	3	▲1
New Hampshire	District	March 10, 1857	3	0	Steady	0	▼3	3	▲3
Rhode Island	District	April 1, 1857	2	0	Steady	0	▼2	2	▲2
Connecticut	District	April 6, 1857	4	2	▲2	0	▼4	2	▲2
Virginia	District	May 28, 1857	13	13	▲1	0	▼1	0	Steady
Alabama	District	August 3, 1857	7	7	▲2	0	▼2	0	Steady
Kentucky	District	August 3, 1857	10	8	▲4	2	▼4	0	Steady
Texas	District	August 3, 1857	2	2	▲1	0	▼1	0	Steady
North Carolina	District	August 6, 1857	8	7	▲2	1	▼2	0	Steady
Tennessee	District	August 6, 1857	10	7	▲2	3	▼2	0	Steady
Georgia	District	October 5, 1857	8	6	Steady	2	Steady	0	Steady
Mississippi	District	October 5–6, 1857	5	5	▲1	0	▼1	0	Steady
Minnesota	At-large	October 13, 1857 (Note: New state. Representatives seated May 11, 1858, during the 1st session.)	2	2	▲2	0	Steady	0	Steady
Louisiana	District	November 3, 1857	4	3	Steady	1	Steady	0	Steady
Maryland	District	November 4, 1857	6	3	▲1	3	▼1	0	Steady
Total			236	133 56.1%	▲50	14 5.9%	▼37	90 38.0%	▼10

Popular vote
Democratic	46.85%
Republican	36.98%
Know Nothing	15.21%
Independent	0.89%
Others	0.07%

House seats
Democratic	55.70%
Republican	37.97%
Know Nothing	5.91%
Independent	0.42%

== Special elections ==
There were a total of thirteen special elections in 1856 and 1857 during the 34th and 35th Congresses.

=== 34th Congress ===
District	Incumbent			This race	
District	Member / Delegate	Party	First elected	Results	Candidates
South Carolina 3	Laurence M. Keitt	Democratic	1853	Incumbent resigned July 15, 1856, following the caning of Charles Sumner. Incumbent re-elected July 29, 1856.	▌ ✓ Laurence M. Keitt (Democratic) 100.0%
South Carolina 4	Preston Brooks	Democratic	1853	Incumbent resigned July 15, 1856, following the caning of Charles Sumner. Incumbent re-elected July 29, 1856.	▌ ✓ Preston Brooks (Democratic) 100.0%
Missouri 5	John Gaines Miller	Whig	1850	Incumbent died May 11, 1856. New member elected August 4, 1856. Know Nothing gain. Winner was not a candidate for the full term; see below.	▌ ✓ Thomas P. Akers (Know Nothing) 55.8%; ▌Claiborne Fox Jackson (Democratic) 44.2%
Illinois 5	William Alexander Richardson	Democratic	1847 (special)	Incumbent resigned August 25, 1856, to run for governor of Illinois. New member elected November 4, 1856. Winner was not a candidate for the full term; see below.	▌ ✓ Jacob C. Davis (Democratic) 52.6%; ▌Thomas C. Sharp (Republican) 35.2%; ▌James B. Kyle (Unknown) 12.2%
Illinois 7	James C. Allen	Democratic	1852	Incumbent resigned July 18, 1856, amid election challenge. Incumbent re-elected November 4, 1856. Winner was not a candidate for the full term; see below.	▌ ✓ James C. Allen (Democratic) 56.3%; ▌William Beatty Archer (Whig) 43.7%
Illinois 8	Vacant			Rep.-elect Lyman Trumbull (D) was later elected U.S. senator and took office March 4, 1855. New member elected November 4, 1856. Democratic hold. Winner was not a candidate for the full term; see below.	▌ ✓ James L. D. Morrison (Democratic) 56.0%; ▌John Thomas (Republican) 42.9%; ▌William H. Short (Unknown) 1.2%
Virginia 1	Thomas H. Bayly	Democratic	1853	Incumbent died June 23, 1856. New member elected November 4, 1856. Democratic hold.	▌ ✓ Muscoe R. H. Garnett (Democratic) 51.6%; ▌Robert Saunders Jr. (Know Nothing) 48.4%
Kansas Territory at-large	John Wilkins Whitfield	Democratic	1854	Seat declared vacant August 1, 1856. Incumbent re-elected November 5, 1856.	▌ ✓ John Wilkins Whitfield (Democratic); ▌Andrew Horatio Reeder (Republican)
Vermont 1	James Meacham	Whig	1849 (special)	Incumbent died August 23, 1856. New member elected December 1, 1856. Republican gain.	▌ ✓ George T. Hodges (Republican) 79.8%; ▌Stoddard B. Colby (Democratic) 20.2%

=== 35th Congress ===
District	Incumbent			This race	
District	Member	Party	First elected	Results	Candidates
Missouri 3	Vacant			Rep.-elect James S. Green (D) was later elected U.S. senator and took office January 12, 1857. New member elected August 3, 1857. Democratic hold.	▌ ✓ John Bullock Clark (Democratic) 58.7%; ▌Joseph M. Collins (Know Nothing) 41.3%
Indiana 1	James Lockhart	Democratic	1851; 1852 (retired); 1856	Incumbent died September 7, 1857. New member elected October 7, 1857. Democratic hold.	▌ ✓ William E. Niblack (Democratic) 99.5%
Indiana 10	Samuel Brenton	Republican	1854	Incumbent died March 29, 1857. New member elected October 7, 1857. Republican hold.	▌ ✓ Charles Case (Republican) 52.3%; ▌James Worden (Democratic) 47.7%
Pennsylvania 12	John Gallagher Montgomery	Democratic	1856	Incumbent died April 24, 1857. New member elected October 13, 1857. Democratic hold.	▌ ✓ Paul Leidy (Democratic) 61.0%; ▌Smith Thompson (Republican) 39.0%

== Alabama ==
District	Incumbent			This race	
District	Member	Party	First elected	Results	Candidates
Alabama 1	Percy Walker	Know Nothing	1855	Incumbent retired. Democratic gain.	▌ ✓ James A. Stallworth (Democratic) 62.0%; ▌John McCaskill (Know Nothing) 38.0%
Alabama 2	Eli S. Shorter	Democratic	1855	Incumbent re-elected.	▌ ✓ Eli S. Shorter (Democratic) 62.4%; ▌Batt Peterson (Know Nothing) 37.6%
Alabama 3	James F. Dowdell	Democratic	1853	Incumbent re-elected.	▌ ✓ James F. Dowdell (Democratic) 50.3%; ▌Thomas J. Judge (Know Nothing) 49.7%
Alabama 4	William Russell Smith	Know Nothing	1851	Incumbent lost re-election. Democratic gain.	▌ ✓ Sydenham Moore (Democratic) 56.5%; ▌William Russell Smith (Know Nothing) 43.5%
Alabama 5	George S. Houston	Democratic	1841; 1849 (retired); 1851	Incumbent re-elected.	▌ ✓ George S. Houston (Democratic) 55.1%; ▌David Hubbard (Democratic) 44.9%
Alabama 6	Williamson R. W. Cobb	Democratic	1847	Incumbent re-elected.	▌ ✓ Williamson R. W. Cobb (Democratic) 62.4%; ▌Henry Sanford (Democratic) 37.6%
Alabama 7	Sampson Willis Harris	Democratic	1847	Incumbent retired. Democratic hold.	▌ ✓ Jabez L. M. Curry (Democratic) 98.5%

== Arkansas ==
District	Incumbent			This race	
District	Member	Party	First elected	Results	Candidates
Arkansas 1	Alfred B. Greenwood	Democratic	1853	Incumbent re-elected.	▌ ✓ Alfred B. Greenwood (Democratic) 71.4%; ▌Hugh Thomason (Know Nothing) 28.6%
Arkansas 2	Albert Rust	Democratic	1854	Incumbent lost renomination. Democratic hold.	▌ ✓ Edward A. Warren (Democratic) 57.6%; ▌Absalom Fowler (Know Nothing) 42.4%

== California ==
District	Incumbent			This race	
District	Member	Party	First elected	Results	Candidates
California at-large 2 seats on a general ticket	James W. Denver	Democratic	1854	Incumbent retired. Democratic hold.	▌ ✓ Charles L. Scott (Democratic) 29.9%; ▌ ✓ Joseph C. McKibbin (Democratic) 21.0%; ▌A. B. Dibble (Know Nothing) 20.7%; ▌Ira P. Rankin (Independent) 13.0%; ▌J. N. Turner (Republican) 12.5%
California at-large 2 seats on a general ticket	Philemon T. Herbert	Democratic	1854	Incumbent retired after manslaughter acquittal. Democratic hold.	▌ ✓ Charles L. Scott (Democratic) 29.9%; ▌ ✓ Joseph C. McKibbin (Democratic) 21.0%; ▌A. B. Dibble (Know Nothing) 20.7%; ▌Ira P. Rankin (Independent) 13.0%; ▌J. N. Turner (Republican) 12.5%

== Connecticut ==
District	Incumbent			This race	
District	Member	Party	First elected	Results	Candidates
Connecticut 1	Ezra Clark Jr.	Know Nothing	1855	Incumbent re-elected as a Republican. Republican gain.	▌ ✓ Ezra Clark Jr. (Republican) 50.8%; ▌Richard D. Hubbard (Democratic) 48.8%
Connecticut 2	John Woodruff	Know Nothing	1855	Incumbent lost re-election as a Republican. Democratic gain.	▌ ✓ Samuel Arnold (Democratic) 51.3%; ▌John Woodruff (Republican) 48.6%
Connecticut 3	Sidney Dean	Know Nothing	1855	Incumbent re-elected as a Republican. Republican gain.	▌ ✓ Sidney Dean (Republican) 54.6%; ▌James A. Hovey (Democratic) 45.4%
Connecticut 4	William W. Welch	Know Nothing	1855	Incumbent retired. Democratic gain.	▌ ✓ William D. Bishop (Democratic) 50.0%; ▌Orris S. Ferry (Republican) 50.0%

== Delaware ==
District	Incumbent			This race	
District	Member	Party	First elected	Results	Candidates
Delaware at-large	Elisha D. Cullen	Know Nothing	1854	Incumbent lost re-election. Democratic gain.	▌ ✓ William G. Whiteley (Democratic) 56.0%; ▌Elisha D. Cullen (Know Nothing) 44.0%

== Florida ==
District	Incumbent			This race	
District	Member	Party	First elected	Results	Candidates
Florida at-large	Augustus Maxwell	Democratic	1852	Incumbent retired. Democratic hold.	▌ ✓ George S. Hawkins (Democratic) 53.1%; ▌James McNair Baker (Know Nothing) 46.9%

== Georgia ==
District	Incumbent			This race	
District	Member	Party	First elected	Results	Candidates
Georgia 1	James Lindsay Seward	Democratic	1853	Incumbent re-elected.	▌ ✓ James Lindsay Seward (Democratic) 51.2%; ▌Francis S. Bartow (Know Nothing) 44.4%; ▌C. S. Gaulden (Independent) 4.4%
Georgia 2	Martin J. Crawford	Democratic	1855	Incumbent re-elected.	▌ ✓ Martin J. Crawford (Democratic) 56.1%; ▌Samuel C. Elam (Know Nothing) 43.9%
Georgia 3	Robert Pleasant Trippe	Know Nothing	1855	Incumbent re-elected.	▌ ✓ Robert Pleasant Trippe (Know Nothing) 51.7%; ▌Jack Bailey (Democratic) 48.3%
Georgia 4	Hiram B. Warner	Democratic	1855	Incumbent retired. Democratic hold.	▌ ✓ Lucius J. Gartrell (Democratic) 53.6%; ▌M. M. Tidwell (Know Nothing) 46.4%
Georgia 5	John H. Lumpkin	Democratic	1855	Incumbent retired. Democratic hold.	▌ ✓ Augustus R. Wright (Democratic) 61.2%; ▌J. W. Hooper (Know Nothing) 36.1%; ▌Tatum (Note: First name unknown.) (Democratic) 2.7%
Georgia 6	Howell Cobb	Democratic	1842; 1851 (retired); 1855	Incumbent retired. Democratic hold.	▌ ✓ James Jackson (Democratic) 56.5%; ▌Simmons (Independent) 43.5%
Georgia 7	Nathaniel Greene Foster	Know Nothing	1855	Incumbent retired. Know Nothing hold.	▌ ✓ Joshua Hill (Know Nothing) 51.5%; ▌Linton Stephens (Democratic) 48.5%
Georgia 8	Alexander H. Stephens	Democratic	1843 (special)	Incumbent re-elected.	▌ ✓ Alexander H. Stephens (Democratic) 57.1%; ▌Thomas W. Miller (Know Nothing) 42.9%

== Illinois ==
District	Incumbent			This race	
District	Member	Party	First elected	Results	Candidates
Illinois 1	Elihu B. Washburne	Republican	1852	Incumbent re-elected.	▌ ✓ Elihu B. Washburne (Republican) 73.9%; ▌Richard S. Molony (Democratic) 25.0%; ▌B. D. Eastman (Know Nothing) 1.0%
Illinois 2	James Hutchinson Woodworth	Republican	1854	Incumbent retired. Republican hold.	▌ ✓ John F. Farnsworth (Republican) 67.2%; ▌John Vannortwick (Democratic) 30.6%; ▌B. F. James (Know Nothing) 2.2%
Illinois 3	Jesse O. Norton	Republican	1852	Incumbent retired. Republican hold.	▌ ✓ Owen Lovejoy (Republican) 59.5%; ▌Uri Osgood (Democratic) 40.5%
Illinois 4	James Knox	Republican	1852	Incumbent retired. Republican hold.	▌ ✓ William Kellogg (Republican) 51.1%; ▌James W. Davidson (Democratic) 45.8%; ▌Arthur H. Griffith (Know Nothing) 3.1%
Illinois 5	Vacant			Rep. William A. Richardson (D) resigned August 25, 1856, to run for governor of Illinois. Democratic hold. Winner was not candidate for unexpired term; see above.	▌ ✓ Isaac N. Morris (Democratic) 53.7%; ▌Jackson Grimshaw (Republican) 45.8%; ▌James S. Irwin (Know Nothing) 0.5%
Illinois 6	Thomas L. Harris	Democratic	1848; 1850 (lost); 1854	Incumbent re-elected.	▌ ✓ Thomas L. Harris (Democratic) 58.0%; ▌John Williams (Republican) 42.0%
Illinois 7	Vacant			Rep. James C. Allen (D) resigned July 18, 1856, amid election contest. Democratic hold. Winner was not candidate for unexpired term; see above.	▌ ✓ Aaron Shaw (Democratic) 56.8%; ▌Henry P. H. Bromwell (Republican) 43.2%
Illinois 8	Vacant			Rep.-elect Lyman Trumbull (D) was later elected U.S. senator and took office March 4, 1855. Democratic hold. Winner was not candidate for unexpired term; see above.	▌ ✓ Robert Smith (Democratic) 60.1%; ▌James D. Lansing (Republican) 39.9%
Illinois 9	Samuel S. Marshall	Democratic	1854	Incumbent re-elected.	▌ ✓ Samuel S. Marshall (Democratic) 82.4%; ▌Benjamin Ladd Wiley (Republican) 17.6%

== Indiana ==
District	Incumbent			This race	
District	Member	Party	First elected	Results	Candidates
Indiana 1	Smith Miller	Democratic	1852	Incumbent retired. Democratic hold.	▌ ✓ James Lockhart (Democratic) 61.5%; ▌James C. Veatch (Republican) 38.5%
Indiana 2	William Hayden English	Democratic	1852	Incumbent re-elected.	▌ ✓ William Hayden English (Democratic) 57.2%; ▌John M. Wilson (Republican) 42.8%
Indiana 3	George Grundy Dunn	People's	1854	Incumbent retired. Democratic gain.	▌ ✓ James Hughes (Democratic) 53.8%; ▌John A. Hendricks (Republican) 46.2%
Indiana 4	William Cumback	People's	1854	Incumbent lost re-election as a Republican. Democratic gain.	▌ ✓ James Bradford Foley (Democratic) 53.7%; ▌William Cumback (Republican) 46.3%
Indiana 5	David P. Holloway	People's	1854	Incumbent retired. Republican gain.	▌ ✓ David Kilgore (Republican) 60.8%; ▌Edmund Johnson (Democratic) 39.2%
Indiana 6	Lucien Barbour	People's	1854	Incumbent retired. Democratic gain.	▌ ✓ James M. Gregg (Democratic) 52.1%; ▌John Coburn (Republican) 47.9%
Indiana 7	Harvey D. Scott	People's	1854	Incumbent retired. Democratic gain.	▌ ✓ John G. Davis (Democratic) 53.9%; ▌John Palmer Usher (Republican) 46.1%
Indiana 8	Daniel Mace	People's	1851	Incumbent retired. Republican gain.	▌ ✓ James Wilson (Republican) 50.5%; ▌Daniel W. Voorhees (Democratic) 49.5%
Indiana 9	Schuyler Colfax	People's	1854	Incumbent re-elected as a Republican. Republican gain.	▌ ✓ Schuyler Colfax (Republican) 52.1%; ▌William Z. Stewart (Democratic) 47.9%
Indiana 10	Samuel Brenton	People's	1854	Incumbent re-elected as a Republican. Republican gain.	▌ ✓ Samuel Brenton (Republican) 51.7%; ▌Robert Lowry (Democratic) 48.3%
Indiana 11	John U. Pettit	People's	1854	Incumbent re-elected as a Republican. Republican gain.	▌ ✓ John U. Pettit (Republican) 51.8%; ▌William Garver (Democratic) 48.2%

== Iowa ==
District	Incumbent			This race	
District	Member	Party	First elected	Results	Candidates
Iowa 1	Augustus Hall	Democratic	1854	Incumbent lost re-election. Republican gain.	▌ ✓ Samuel Ryan Curtis (Republican) 50.2%; ▌Augustus Hall (Democratic) 47.5%; ▌John J. Selman (Know Nothing) 2.3%
Iowa 2	James Thorington	Whig	1854	Incumbent lost renomination as a Republican. Republican gain.	▌ ✓ Timothy Davis (Republican) 58.0%; ▌Shepherd Leffler (Democratic) 42.0%

== Kansas Territory ==
See non-voting delegates, below.

== Kentucky ==
District	Incumbent			This race	
District	Member	Party	First elected	Results	Candidates
Kentucky 1	Henry Cornelius Burnett	Democratic	1855	Incumbent re-elected.	▌ ✓ Henry Cornelius Burnett (Democratic) 75.3%; ▌Owen Grimes (Know Nothing) 24.7%
Kentucky 2	John P. Campbell Jr.	Know Nothing	1855	Incumbent withdrew. Democratic gain.	▌ ✓ Samuel Peyton (Democratic) 53.9%; ▌James Leeper Johnson (Know Nothing) 46.1%
Kentucky 3	Warner Underwood	Know Nothing	1855	Incumbent re-elected.	▌ ✓ Warner Underwood (Know Nothing) 50.8%; ▌Joseph Horace Lewis (Democratic) 49.2%
Kentucky 4	Albert G. Talbott	Democratic	1855	Incumbent re-elected.	▌ ✓ Albert G. Talbott (Democratic) 50.6%; ▌William Clayton Anderson (Know Nothing) 49.4%
Kentucky 5	Joshua Jewett	Democratic	1855	Incumbent re-elected.	▌ ✓ Joshua Jewett (Democratic) 59.6%; ▌Bryan Young (Know Nothing) 40.4%
Kentucky 6	John Milton Elliott	Democratic	1853	Incumbent re-elected.	▌ ✓ John Milton Elliott (Democratic) 55.7%; ▌John A. Moore (Know Nothing) 44.3%
Kentucky 7	Humphrey Marshall	Know Nothing	1855	Incumbent re-elected.	▌ ✓ Humphrey Marshall (Know Nothing) 55.0%; ▌Thomas H. Holt (Democratic) 45.0%
Kentucky 8	Alexander Keith Marshall	Know Nothing	1855	Incumbent retired. Democratic gain.	▌ ✓ James Brown Clay (Democratic) 50.5%; ▌Roger Hanson (Know Nothing) 49.5%
Kentucky 9	Leander Cox	Know Nothing	1853	Incumbent lost re-election. Democratic gain.	▌ ✓ John Calvin Mason (Democratic) 52.0%; ▌Leander Cox (Know Nothing) 48.0%
Kentucky 10	Samuel F. Swope	Know Nothing	1855	Incumbent retired. Democratic gain.	▌ ✓ John W. Stevenson (Democratic) 67.6%; ▌William L. Rankin (Know Nothing) 32.4%

== Louisiana ==
District	Incumbent			This race	
District	Member	Party	First elected	Results	Candidates
Louisiana 1	George Eustis Jr.	Know Nothing	1855	Incumbent re-elected.	▌ ✓ George Eustis Jr. (Know Nothing) 60.4%; ▌Charles J. Villiers (Democratic) 39.6%
Louisiana 2	Miles Taylor	Democratic	1855	Incumbent re-elected.	▌ ✓ Miles Taylor (Democratic) 50.3%; ▌Glendy Burke (Know Nothing) 49.7%
Louisiana 3	Thomas G. Davidson	Democratic	1855	Incumbent re-elected.	▌ ✓ Thomas G. Davidson (Democratic) 43.0%; ▌George W. Watterson (Know Nothing) 35.4%; ▌Laurent J. Sigur (Independent) 21.6%
Louisiana 4	John M. Sandidge	Democratic	1855	Incumbent re-elected.	▌ ✓ John M. Sandidge (Democratic) 63.5%; ▌W. H. Sparks (Know Nothing) 36.5%

== Maine ==
District	Incumbent			This race	
District	Member	Party	First elected	Results	Candidates
Maine 1	John M. Wood	Republican	1854	Incumbent re-elected.	▌ ✓ John M. Wood (Republican) 53.4%; ▌Josiah S. Little (Democratic) 46.6%
Maine 2	John J. Perry	Republican	1854	Incumbent retired. Republican hold.	▌ ✓ Charles J. Gilman (Republican) 57.3%; ▌Eben F. Pillsbury (Democratic) 42.7%
Maine 3	Ebenezer Knowlton	Republican	1854	Incumbent retired. Republican hold.	▌ ✓ Nehemiah Abbott (Republican) 56.1%; ▌Henry Ingalls (Democratic) 43.9%
Maine 4	Samuel P. Benson	Republican	1852	Incumbent retired. Republican hold.	▌ ✓ Freeman H. Morse (Republican) 65.1%; ▌David Bronson (Democratic) 34.9%
Maine 5	Israel Washburn Jr.	Republican	1850	Incumbent re-elected.	▌ ✓ Israel Washburn Jr. (Republican) 60.1%; ▌Abraham Sanborn (Democratic) 39.9%
Maine 6	Thomas J. D. Fuller	Democratic	1848	Incumbent retired. Republican gain.	▌ ✓ Stephen Clark Foster (Republican) 52.9%; ▌Amo Wiswell (Democratic) 47.1%

== Maryland ==
Elections were held November 3–4, 1857.

District	Incumbent			This race	
District	Member	Party	First elected	Results	Candidates
Maryland 1	James A. Stewart	Democratic	1855	Incumbent re-elected.	▌ ✓ James A. Stewart (Democratic) 50.70%; ▌Teagle Townsend (Know Nothing) 49.30%
Maryland 2	James B. Ricaud	Know Nothing	1855	Incumbent re-elected.	▌ ✓ James B. Ricaud (Know Nothing) 52.42%; ▌Ramsey McHenry (Democratic) 47.58%
Maryland 3	James Morrison Harris	Know Nothing	1855	Incumbent re-elected.	▌ ✓ James Morrison Harris (Know Nothing) 61.63%; ▌ William Pinkney Whyte (Democratic) 38.37%
Maryland 4	Henry Winter Davis	Know Nothing	1855	Incumbent re-elected.	▌ ✓ Henry Winter Davis (Know Nothing) 72.55%; ▌Henry P. Brooks (Democratic) 27.45%
Maryland 5	Henry W. Hoffman	Know Nothing	1855	Incumbent lost re-election. Democratic gain.	▌ ✓ Jacob M. Kunkel (Democratic) 50.51%; ▌ Henry W. Hoffman (Know Nothing) 49.49%
Maryland 6	Thomas F. Bowie	Democratic	1855	Incumbent re-elected.	▌ ✓ Thomas F. Bowie (Democratic) 50.51%; ▌William J. Blackstone (Know Nothing) 49.49%

== Massachusetts ==
District	Incumbent			This race	
District	Member	Party	First elected	Results	Candidates
Massachusetts 1	Robert B. Hall	Know Nothing	1854	Incumbent re-elected as a Republican. Republican gain.	▌ ✓ Robert B. Hall (Republican) 69.73%; ▌Moses Bates (Democratic) 16.14%; ▌Daniel Fisher (American) 14.12%
Massachusetts 2	James Buffinton	Know Nothing	1854	Incumbent re-elected as a Republican. Republican gain.	▌ ✓ James Buffinton (Republican) 68.25%; ▌Charles R. Vickery (Democratic) 20.58%; ▌Darius Dunbar (American) 7.03%
Massachusetts 3	William S. Damrell	Know Nothing	1854	Incumbent re-elected as a Republican. Republican gain.	▌ ✓ William S. Damrell (Republican) 61.57%; ▌Arthur W. Austin (Democratic) 29.96%; ▌Alfred B. Ely (American) 8.47%
Massachusetts 4	Linus B. Comins	Know Nothing	1854	Incumbent re-elected as a Republican. Republican gain.	▌ ✓ Linus B. Comins (Republican) 45.92%; ▌Charles Greene (Democratic) 39.22%; ▌Benjamin F. Cooke (American) 14.85%
Massachusetts 5	Anson Burlingame	Know Nothing	1854	Incumbent re-elected as a Republican. Republican gain.	▌ ✓ Anson Burlingame (Republican) 50.26%; ▌William Appleton (American) 49.74%
Massachusetts 6	Timothy Davis	Know Nothing	1854	Incumbent re-elected as a Republican. Republican gain.	▌ ✓ Timothy Davis (Republican) 69.39%; ▌Nathaniel J. Lord (Democratic) 22.21%; ▌Benjamin Perley (American) 7.74%; Scattering 0.66%
Massachusetts 7	Nathaniel P. Banks	Know Nothing	1852	Incumbent re-elected as a Republican. Republican gain.	▌ ✓ Nathaniel P. Banks (Republican) 61.95%; ▌Isaac H. Wright (Democratic) 26.31%; ▌Isaac Story (American) 11.74%
Massachusetts 8	Chauncey L. Knapp	Know Nothing	1854	Incumbent re-elected as a Republican. Republican gain.	▌ ✓ Chauncey L. Knapp (Republican) 70.36%; ▌Benjamin Butler (Democratic) 26.97%; ▌Abiel Lewis (American) 2.66%
Massachusetts 9	Alexander De Witt	Know Nothing	1852	Incumbent lost re-election. Republican gain.	▌ ✓ Eli Thayer (Republican) 53.69%; ▌Alexander De Witt (American) 26.57%; ▌Nathaniel Wood (Democratic) 17.98%; ▌Alfred Mowrey (American) 1.76%
Massachusetts 10	Calvin C. Chaffee	Know Nothing	1855 (special)	Incumbent re-elected as a Republican. Republican gain.	▌ ✓ Calvin C. Chaffee (Republican) 72.66%; ▌William C. Fowler (American) 27.34%
Massachusetts 11	Mark Trafton	Know Nothing	1854	Incumbent lost re-election. Republican gain.	▌ ✓ Henry L. Dawes (Republican) 43.85%; ▌Mark Trafton (American) 27.41%; ▌Josiah D. Weston (Democratic) 28.74%

== Michigan ==
District	Incumbent			This race	
District	Member	Party	First elected	Results	Candidates
Michigan 1	William A. Howard	Republican	1854	Incumbent re-elected.	▌ ✓ William A. Howard (Republican) 51.6%; ▌George V. N. Lothrop (Democratic) 48.4%
Michigan 2	Henry Waldron	Republican	1854	Incumbent re-elected.	▌ ✓ Henry Waldron (Republican) 62.1%; ▌John S. Barry (Democratic) 37.9%
Michigan 3	David S. Walbridge	Republican	1854	Incumbent re-elected.	▌ ✓ David S. Walbridge (Republican) 59.3%; ▌Flavius Littlejohn (Democratic) 40.7%
Michigan 4	George W. Peck	Democratic	1854	Incumbent lost re-election. Republican gain.	▌ ✓ Dewitt C. Leach (Republican) 55.7%; ▌George W. Peck (Democratic) 44.3%

== Minnesota ==
Minnesota Territory elected three members in advance of Minnesota's 1848 statehood. "Although three men won this election, which was held before Minnesota was actually a state, only two representatives from Minnesota were allowed in the congressional bill creating the state in 1858. George L. Becker lost in the drawing of lots to decide who would present their credentials, therefore he did not serve in Congress."

District	Incumbent			This race	
District	Member	Party	First elected	Results	Candidates
Minnesota at-large 2 seats on a general ticket	None (New seat)			New state would be admitted May 11, 1858. Democratic gain.	Elected on a general ticket: ▌ ✓ William Wallace Phelps (Democratic) 17.3%; ▌ ✓ James M. Cavanaugh (Democratic) 17.2%; ▌ George Loomis Becker (Democratic) 17.1%; ▌Henry Adoniram Swift (Republican) 16.2%; ▌Cyrus Aldrich (Republican) 16.1%; ▌Morton S. Wilkinson (Republican) 16.1%
Minnesota at-large 2 seats on a general ticket	None (New seat)			New state would be admitted May 11, 1858. Democratic gain.	Elected on a general ticket: ▌ ✓ William Wallace Phelps (Democratic) 17.3%; ▌ ✓ James M. Cavanaugh (Democratic) 17.2%; ▌ George Loomis Becker (Democratic) 17.1%; ▌Henry Adoniram Swift (Republican) 16.2%; ▌Cyrus Aldrich (Republican) 16.1%; ▌Morton S. Wilkinson (Republican) 16.1%

== Mississippi ==
Elections held late, from October 5 to 6, 1857.

District	Incumbent			This race	
District	Member	Party	First elected	Results	Candidates
Mississippi 1	Daniel B. Wright	Democratic	1853	Incumbent retired. Democratic hold.	▌ ✓ Lucius Q. C. Lamar (Democratic) 63.76%; ▌James L. Alcorn (Know Nothing) 36.24%
Mississippi 2	Hendley S. Bennett	Democratic	1855	Incumbent lost renomination. Democratic hold.	▌ ✓ Reuben Davis (Democratic) 65.30%; ▌Charles Clark (Know Nothing) 34.70%
Mississippi 3	William Barksdale	Democratic	1853	Incumbent re-elected.	▌ ✓ William Barksdale (Democratic) 98.21%; Scattering 1.79%
Mississippi 4	William A. Lake	Know Nothing	1855	Incumbent lost re-election. Democratic gain.	▌ ✓ Otho R. Singleton (Democratic) 55.04%; ▌William A. Lake (Know Nothing) 44.97%
Mississippi 5	John A. Quitman	Democratic	1855	Incumbent re-elected.	▌ ✓ John A. Quitman (Democratic) 98.47%; Scattering 1.53%

== Missouri ==
District	Incumbent			This race	
District	Member	Party	First elected	Results	Candidates
Missouri 1	Luther Martin Kennett	Whig	1854	Incumbent lost re-election as a Know Nothing candidate. Benton Democratic - Republican gain.	▌ ✓ Francis P. Blair Jr. (Benton Democratic / Republican) 43.8%; ▌ Luther Martin Kennett (Know Nothing) 40.3%; ▌ Thomas Caute Reynolds (Democratic) 15.8%
Missouri 2	Gilchrist Porter	Whig	1854	Incumbent retired. Know Nothing gain.	▌ ✓ Thomas L. Anderson (Know Nothing) 52.1%; ▌ Richard F. Richmond (Democratic) 47.9%
Missouri 3	James J. Lindley	Whig	1852	Incumbent lost re-election as a Know Nothing candidate. Winner declined seat upon election to U.S. Senate. Democratic gain.	▌ ✓ James S. Green (Democratic) 55.3%; ▌ James J. Lindley (Know Nothing) 44.7%
Missouri 4	Mordecai Oliver	Whig	1852	Incumbent retired. Democratic gain.	▌ ✓ James Craig (Democratic) 56.8%; ▌ James H. Moss (Know Nothing) 40.8%; ▌ Joel Turnham (Benton Democratic) 2.4%
Missouri 5	John Gaines Miller	Whig	1850	Incumbent retired. Know Nothing gain.	▌ ✓ Samuel H. Woodson (Know Nothing) 41.6%; ▌ [FNU] Douglas (Democratic) 32.4%; ▌ Thomas L. Price (Benton Democratic) 26.0%
Missouri 6	John S. Phelps	Democratic	1844	Incumbent re-elected.	▌ ✓ John S. Phelps (Democratic) 58.1%; ▌ Burr H. Emerson (Know Nothing) 41.3%
Missouri 7	Samuel Caruthers	Whig	1852	Incumbent re-elected as a Democratic candidate. Democratic gain.	▌ ✓ Samuel Caruthers (Democratic) 52.7%; ▌ David E. Perrymen (Know Nothing) 31.0%; ▌ John D. Stephenson (Benton Democratic) 16.3%

== Nebraska Territory ==
See non-voting delegates, below.

== New Hampshire ==
District	Incumbent			This race	
District	Member	Party	First elected	Results	Candidates
New Hampshire 1	James Pike	Know Nothing	1855	Incumbent re-elected as a Republican. Republican gain.	▌ ✓ James Pike (Republican) 52.2%; ▌ George W. Kittredge (Democratic) 47.8%
New Hampshire 2	Mason Tappan	Know Nothing	1855	Incumbent re-elected as a Republican. Republican gain.	▌ ✓ Mason Tappan (Republican) 53.8%; ▌ George W. Morrison (Democratic) 46.2%
New Hampshire 3	Aaron H. Cragin	Know Nothing	1855	Incumbent re-elected as a Republican. Republican gain.	▌ ✓ Aaron H. Cragin (Republican) 52.7%; ▌ William P. Wheeler (Democratic) 47.3%

== New Jersey ==
District	Incumbent			This race	
District	Member	Party	First elected	Results	Candidates
New Jersey 1	Isaiah D. Clawson	Whig	1854	Incumbent re-elected as a Republican - Know Nothing candidate. Republican - Know Nothing gain.	▌ ✓ Isaiah D. Clawson (Republican / Know Nothing) 56.8%; ▌ Charles Hineline (Democratic) 43.2%
New Jersey 2	George R. Robbins	Whig	1854	Incumbent re-elected as a Republican - Know Nothing candidate. Republican - Know Nothing gain.	▌ ✓ George R. Robbins (Republican / Know Nothing) 52.3%; ▌ James Walter Wall (Democratic) 47.7%
New Jersey 3	James Bishop	Whig	1856	Incumbent lost re-election as a Republican - Know Nothing candidate. Democratic gain.	▌ ✓ Garnett Adrain (Democratic) 52.5%; ▌ James Bishop (Republican / Know Nothing) 47.5%
New Jersey 4	George Vail	Democratic	1852	Incumbent retired. Democratic hold.	▌ ✓ John Huyler (Democratic) 52.7%; ▌ [FNU] Osborne (Republican) 33.8%; ▌ Charles Ingalls (Know Nothing) 13.5%
New Jersey 5	Alexander C. M. Pennington	Whig	1852	Incumbent retired. Democratic gain.	▌ ✓ Jacob R. Wortendyke (Democratic) 42.9%; ▌ Amzi Dodd (Republican) 30.5%; ▌ Frederick B. Betts (Know Nothing) 26.6%

== New York ==
District	Incumbent			This race	
District	Member	Party	First elected	Results	Candidates
New York 1
New York 2
New York 3
New York 4
New York 5
New York 6
New York 7
New York 8
New York 9
New York 10
New York 11
New York 12
New York 13
New York 14
New York 15
New York 16
New York 17
New York 18
New York 19
New York 20
New York 21
New York 22
New York 23
New York 24
New York 25
New York 26
New York 27
New York 28
New York 29
New York 30
New York 31
New York 32
New York 33

== North Carolina ==
District	Incumbent			This race	
District	Member	Party	First elected	Results	Candidates
North Carolina 1
North Carolina 2
North Carolina 3
North Carolina 4
North Carolina 5
North Carolina 6
North Carolina 7
North Carolina 8

== Ohio ==
District	Incumbent			This race	
District	Member	Party	First elected	Results	Candidates
Ohio 1
Ohio 2
Ohio 3
Ohio 4
Ohio 5
Ohio 6
Ohio 7
Ohio 8
Ohio 9
Ohio 10
Ohio 11
Ohio 12
Ohio 13
Ohio 14
Ohio 15
Ohio 16
Ohio 17
Ohio 18
Ohio 19
Ohio 20
Ohio 21

== Oregon Territory ==
See non-voting delegates, below.

== Pennsylvania ==
District	Incumbent			This race	
District	Member	Party	First elected	Results	Candidates
Pennsylvania 1	Thomas B. Florence	Democratic	1850	Incumbent re-elected.	▌ ✓ Thomas B. Florence (Democratic) 56.62%; ▌Edward B. Knight (Republican) 43.38%
Pennsylvania 2	Job R. Tyson	Whig	1854	Incumbent retired. Republican gain.	▌ ✓ Edward Joy Morris (Republican) 51.58%; ▌John A. Marshall (Democratic) 48.42%
Pennsylvania 3	William Millward	Opposition	1854	Incumbent lost re-election as a Republican. Democratic gain.	▌ ✓ James Landy (Democratic) 54.02%; ▌William Millward (Republican) 45.98%
Pennsylvania 4	Jacob Broom	Know Nothing	1854	Incumbent retired. Democratic gain.	▌ ✓ Henry M. Phillips (Democratic) 50.72%; ▌Robert Faust (Know Nothing) 35.86%; ▌William D. Kelley (Republican) 13.43%
Pennsylvania 5	John Cadwalader	Democratic	1854	Incumbent retired. Democratic hold.	▌ ✓ Owen Jones (Democratic) 54.86%; ▌Daniel H. Mulvany (Whig) 45.14%
Pennsylvania 6	John Hickman	Democratic	1854	Incumbent re-elected.	▌ ✓ John Hickman (Democratic) 48.91%; ▌John S. Bowen (Republican) 47.85%; ▌John Larkin Jr. (Know Nothing) 3.24%
Pennsylvania 7	Samuel C. Bradshaw	Opposition	1854	Incumbent lost re-election as a Republican. Democratic gain.	▌ ✓ Henry Chapman (Democratic) 54.01%; ▌Samuel C. Bradshaw (Republican) 45.99%
Pennsylvania 8	J. Glancy Jones	Democratic	1850; 1852 (retired); 1854 (special)	Incumbent re-elected.	▌ ✓ J. Glancy Jones (Democratic) 71.60%; ▌David Yoder (Republican) 28.40%
Pennsylvania 9	Anthony E. Roberts	Opposition	1854	Incumbent re-elected as a Republican. Republican gain.	▌ ✓ Anthony E. Roberts (Republican) 54.59%; ▌Isaac E. Heister (Democratic) 45.41%
Pennsylvania 10	John C. Kunkel	Opposition	1854	Incumbent re-elected as a Republican. Republican gain.	▌ ✓ John C. Kunkel (Republican) 55.63%; ▌Henry C. Eyer (Democratic) 44.37%
Pennsylvania 11	James H. Campbell	Opposition	1854	Incumbent lost re-election as a Republican. Democratic gain.	▌ ✓ William L. Dewart (Democratic) 58.26%; ▌James H. Campbell (Republican) 41.74%
Pennsylvania 12	Henry M. Fuller	Opposition	1850; 1852 (lost); 1854	Incumbent retired. Democratic gain.	▌ ✓ John G. Montgomery (Democratic) 57.69%; ▌Elhanan Smith (Republican) 42.31%
Pennsylvania 13	Asa Packer	Democratic	1852	Incumbent retired. Democratic hold.	▌ ✓ William H. Dimmick (Democratic) 68.93%; ▌Samuel E. Demmick (Republican) 31.07%
Pennsylvania 14	Galusha A. Grow	Democratic	1850	Incumbent re-elected as a Republican. Republican gain.	▌ ✓ Galusha A. Grow (Republican) 71.31%; ▌Daniel L. Sherwood (Democratic) 28.69%
Pennsylvania 15	John J. Pearce	Opposition	1854	Incumbent retired. Democratic gain.	▌ ✓ Allison White (Democratic) 51.36%; ▌William H. Irvin (Republican) 48.64%
Pennsylvania 16	Lemuel Todd	Opposition	1854	Incumbent lost re-election as a Republican. Democratic gain.	▌ ✓ John A. Ahl (Democratic) 53.75%; ▌Lemuel Todd (Republican) 46.25%
Pennsylvania 17	David F. Robison	Opposition	1854	Incumbent retired. Democratic gain.	▌ ✓ Wilson Reilly (Democratic) 51.28%; ▌Joseph Pumroy (Republican) 48.72%
Pennsylvania 18	John R. Edie	Opposition	1854	Incumbent re-elected as a Republican. Republican gain.	▌ ✓ John R. Edie (Republican) 50.91%; ▌Cyrus L. Pershing (Democratic) 49.09%
Pennsylvania 19	John Covode	Opposition	1854	Incumbent re-elected as a Republican. Republican gain.	▌ ✓ John Covode (Union) 54.40%; ▌Alexander McKinney (Democratic) 45.60%
Pennsylvania 20	Jonathan Knight	Opposition	1854	Incumbent lost re-election as a Republican. Democratic gain.	▌ ✓ William Montgomery (Democratic) 52.15%; ▌Jonathan Knight (Republican) 47.85%
Pennsylvania 21	David Ritchie	Opposition	1852	Incumbent re-elected as a Republican. Republican gain.	▌ ✓ David Ritchie (Republican) 54.45%; ▌Wilson McCandless (Democratic) 42.17%; ▌William M. Wright (Know Nothing) 3.38%
Pennsylvania 22	Samuel A. Purviance	Opposition	1854	Incumbent re-elected as a Republican. Republican gain.	▌ ✓ Samuel A. Purviance (Republican) 57.09%; ▌James Gibson (Democratic) 40.51%; ▌Alexander Wadlow (Know Nothing) 2.40%
Pennsylvania 23	John Allison	Opposition	1850; 1852 (lost); 1854	Incumbent retired. Republican gain.	▌ ✓ William Stewart (Republican) 61.00%; ▌Thomas Cunningham (Democratic) 39.00%
Pennsylvania 24	David Barclay	Democratic	1854	Incumbent retired. Democratic hold.	▌ ✓ James L. Gillis (Democratic) 51.75%; ▌James S. Myers (Republican) 48.25%
Pennsylvania 25	John Dick	Opposition	1852	Incumbent re-elected as a Republican. Republican gain.	▌ ✓ John Dick (Republican) 67.97%; ▌James A. McFadden (Democratic) 32.03%

== Rhode Island ==
District	Incumbent			This race	
District	Member	Party	First elected	Results	Candidates
Rhode Island 1
Rhode Island 2

== South Carolina ==
District	Incumbent			This race	
District	Member	Party	First elected	Results	Candidates
South Carolina 1
South Carolina 2
South Carolina 3
South Carolina 4
South Carolina 5
South Carolina 6

== Tennessee ==
District	Incumbent			This race	
District	Member	Party	First elected	Results	Candidates
Tennessee 1	Albert G. Watkins	Democratic	1855	Incumbent re-elected.	▌ ✓ Albert G. Watkins (Democratic) 50.58%; ▌Nathaniel G. Taylor (Know Nothing) 49.42%
Tennessee 2	William H. Sneed	Know Nothing	1855	Incumbent retired. Know Nothing hold.	▌ ✓ Horace Maynard (Know Nothing) 50.89%; ▌Wayne W. Wallace (Democratic) 49.11%
Tennessee 3	Samuel A. Smith	Democratic	1853	Incumbent re-elected.	▌ ✓ Samuel A. Smith (Democratic) 52.98%; ▌William Heiskell (Know Nothing) 47.02%
Tennessee 4	John H. Savage	Democratic	1855	Incumbent re-elected.	▌ ✓ John H. Savage (Democratic) 55.16%; ▌Joseph Pickett (Know Nothing) 44.84%
Tennessee 5	Charles Ready	Know Nothing	1853	Incumbent re-elected.	▌ ✓ Charles Ready (Know Nothing) 51.25%; ▌Joseph Guild (Democratic) 48.75%
Tennessee 6	George W. Jones	Democratic	1842	Incumbent re-elected.	▌ ✓ George W. Jones (Democratic) 100%
Tennessee 7	John V. Wright	Democratic	1855	Incumbent re-elected.	▌ ✓ John V. Wright (Democratic) 83.81%; ▌D. E. McElrath (Know Nothing) 16.19%
Tennessee 8	Felix Zollicoffer	Know Nothing	1853	Incumbent re-elected.	▌ ✓ Felix Zollicoffer (Know Nothing) 52.18%; ▌James M. Quarles (Democratic) 47.82%
Tennessee 9	Emerson Etheridge	Know Nothing	1853	Incumbent lost re-election. Democratic gain.	▌ ✓ John D. C. Atkins (Democratic) 50.37%; ▌Emerson Etheridge (Know Nothing) 49.63%
Tennessee 10	Thomas Rivers	Know Nothing	1855	Incumbent retired. Democratic gain.	▌ ✓ William T. Avery (Democratic) 51.32%; ▌William H. Stevens (Know Nothing) 48.68%

== Texas ==
District	Incumbent			This race	
District	Member	Party	First elected	Results	Candidates
Texas 1
Texas 2

== Vermont ==
District	Incumbent			This race	
District	Member	Party	First elected	Results	Candidates
Vermont 1	George T. Hodges	Republican	1856 (special)	Incumbent retired. Republican hold.	▌ ✓ E. P. Walton (Republican) 71.1%; ▌Horatio Needham (Democratic) 28.6%; ▌John Pierpoint (Free Soil) 4.7%
Vermont 2	Justin S. Morrill	Whig	1854	Incumbent re-elected as a Republican.	▌ ✓ Justin S. Morrill (Republican) 76.1%; ▌E. B. Chase (Democratic) 23.8%
Vermont 3	Alvah Sabin	Whig	1852	Incumbent retired. Republican gain.	▌ ✓ Homer Elihu Royce (Republican) 73.9%; ▌W. H. H. Bingham (Democratic) 25.9%

== Virginia ==
District	Incumbent			This race	
District	Member	Party	First elected	Results	Candidates
Virginia 1	Muscoe R. H. Garnett	Democratic	1856 (special)	Incumbent re-elected.	▌ ✓ Muscoe R. H. Garnett (Democratic) 57.1%; ▌John Critcher (Know Nothing) 42.9%
Virginia 2	John Millson	Democratic	1853	Incumbent re-elected.	▌ ✓ John Millson (Democratic) 100%
Virginia 3	John Caskie	Democratic	1853	Incumbent re-elected.	▌ ✓ John Caskie (Democratic) 63.7%; ▌A. Judson Crane (Know Nothing) 36.3%
Virginia 4	William Goode	Democratic	1853	Incumbent re-elected.	▌ ✓ William Goode (Democratic) 76.0%; ▌[FNU] Collier (Know Nothing) 24.0%
Virginia 5	Thomas S. Bocock	Democratic	1853	Incumbent re-elected.	▌ ✓ Thomas S. Bocock (Democratic) 100%
Virginia 6	Paulus Powell	Democratic	1853	Incumbent re-elected.	▌ ✓ Paulus Powell (Democratic) 100%
Virginia 7	William Smith	Democratic	1853	Incumbent re-elected.	▌ ✓ William Smith (Democratic) 57.5%; ▌Edgar Snowden Sr. (Know Nothing) 42.5%
Virginia 8	Charles J. Faulkner	Democratic	1853	Incumbent re-elected.	▌ ✓ Charles J. Faulkner (Democratic) 59.5%; ▌William Lucas (Know Nothing) 40.5%
Virginia 9	John Letcher	Democratic	1851	Incumbent re-elected.	▌ ✓ John Letcher (Democratic) 75.3%; ▌[FNU] Imboden (Unknown) 24.7%
Virginia 10	Zedekiah Kidwell	Democratic	1853	Incumbent retired. Democratic hold.	▌ ✓ Sherrard Clemens (Democratic) 71.5%; ▌[FNU] Dunnington (Know Nothing) 28.5%
Virginia 11	John S. Carlile	Know Nothing	1855	Incumbent lost re-election. Democratic gain.	▌ ✓ Albert G. Jenkins (Democratic) 53.8%; ▌John S. Carlile (Know Nothing) 46.2%
Virginia 12	Henry A. Edmundson	Democratic	1849	Incumbent re-elected.	▌ ✓ Henry A. Edmundson (Democratic) 100%
Virginia 13	Fayette McMullen	Democratic	1849	Incumbent retired. Democratic hold.	▌ ✓ George W. Hopkins (Democratic) 50.3%; ▌Elbert S. Martin (Know Nothing) 49.7%

== Wisconsin ==
District	Incumbent			This race	
District	Member	Party	First elected	Results	Candidates
Wisconsin 1	Daniel Wells Jr.	Democratic	1852	Incumbent retired. Republican gain.	▌ ✓ John F. Potter (Republican) 50.6%; ▌Jackson Hadley (Democratic) 49.4%
Wisconsin 2	Cadwallader C. Washburn	Republican	1854	Incumbent re-elected.	▌ ✓ Cadwallader C. Washburn (Republican) 61.8%; ▌Samuel Crawford (Democratic) 38.2%
Wisconsin 3	Charles Billinghurst	Republican	1854	Incumbent re-elected.	▌ ✓ Charles Billinghurst (Republican) 52.0%; ▌Harrison Carroll Hobart (Democratic) 48.0%

== Non-voting delegates ==
District	Incumbent			This race	
District	Delegate	Party	First elected	Results	Candidates
Kansas	John Wilkins Whitfield	Democratic	1854; 1856 (seat vacated); 1856 (special)	Re-elected in 1855 before seat was vacated. Won special 1856 election. Democratic hold.	▌ ✓ John Wilkins Whitfield (Democratic); ▌ Andrew H. Reeder (Free-State Democrat)
Minnesota	Henry Mower Rice	Democratic	1852	Incumbent retired. New delegate elected. Democratic hold. District eliminated in 1858 upon Minnesota's statehood.	▌ ✓ William W. Kingsbury (Democratic); [data missing]
Nebraska	Bird Chapman	Democratic	1854	Incumbent lost re-election. New delegate elected August 3, 1857. Independent Democratic gain.	▌ ✓ Fenner Ferguson (Independent Democratic); ▌Bird Chapman (Democratic)
Oregon	Joseph Lane	Democratic	1851	Incumbent re-elected.	▌ ✓ Joseph Lane (Democratic); [data missing]

== See also ==
- 1856 United States elections
  - 1856 United States presidential election
  - 1856–57 United States Senate elections
- List of United States House of Representatives elections (1856–present)
- 34th United States Congress
- 35th United States Congress

== Bibliography ==
- Dubin, Michael J. (March 1, 1998). United States Congressional Elections, 1788-1997: The Official Results of the Elections of the 1st Through 105th Congresses. McFarland and Company. ISBN 978-0786402830.
- Martis, Kenneth C. (January 1, 1989). The Historical Atlas of Political Parties in the United States Congress, 1789-1989. Macmillan Publishing Company. ISBN 978-0029201701.
- Moore, John L., ed. (1994). Congressional Quarterly's Guide to U.S. Elections (Third ed.). Congressional Quarterly Inc. ISBN 978-0871879967.
- "Party Divisions of the House of Representatives* 1789–Present". Office of the Historian, House of United States House of Representatives.
