= Senator Hiester =

Senator Hiester may refer to:

- Gabriel Hiester (1749–1824), Pennsylvania State Senate
- Joseph Hiester (1752–1832), Pennsylvania State Senate
- William Muhlenberg Hiester (1818–1878), Pennsylvania State Senate
- William Hiester (Pennsylvania politician) (1790–1853), Pennsylvania State Senate

== See also ==
- Senator Hester (disambiguation)
