= William Hiester =

William Hiester may refer to:

- William Hiester (Pennsylvania politician) (1790–1853), Pennsylvania congressman
- William Muhlenberg Hiester (1818–1878), Pennsylvania military and political leader
