= 1866 Pennsylvania gubernatorial election =

- October 9, 1866
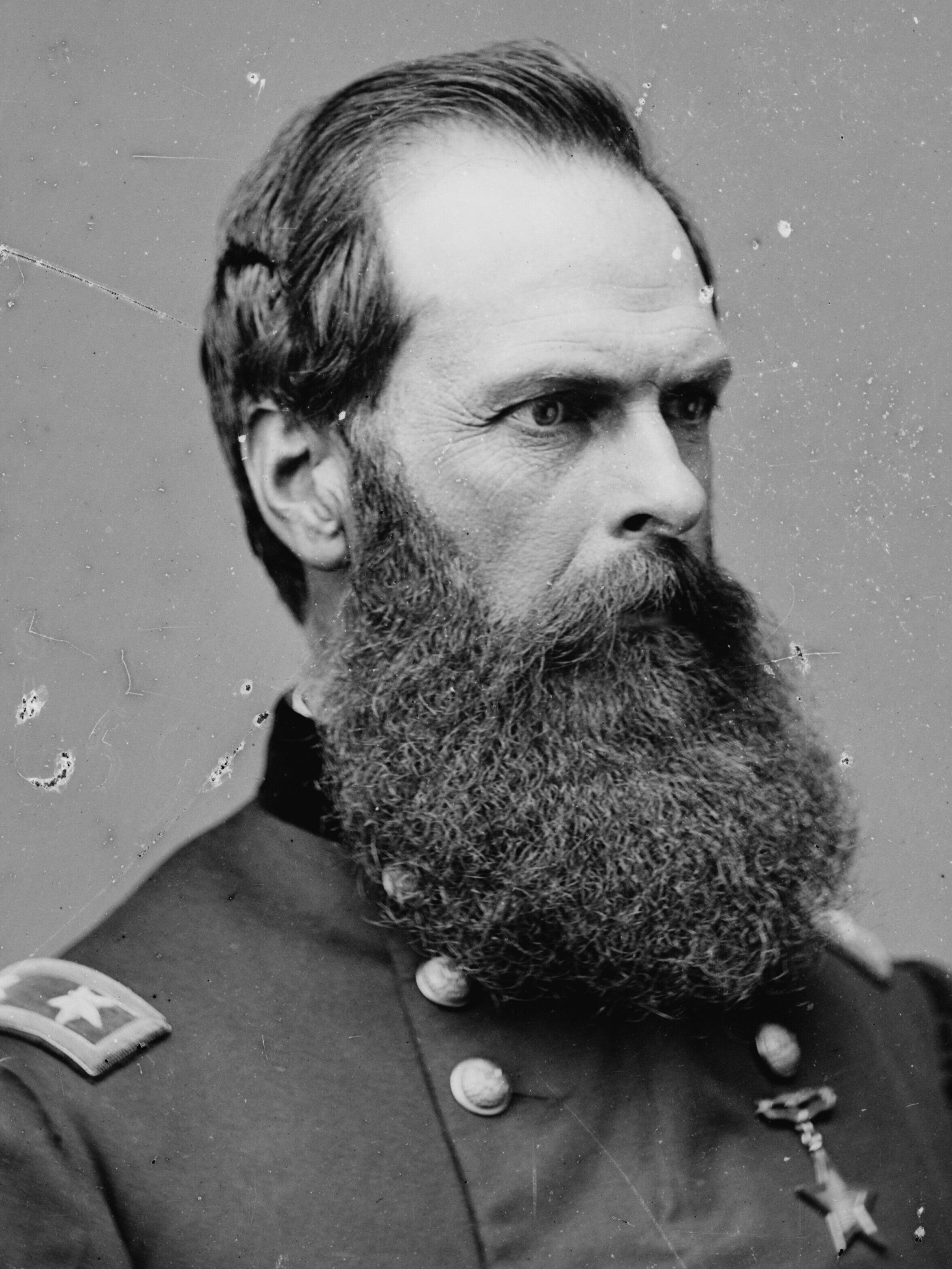

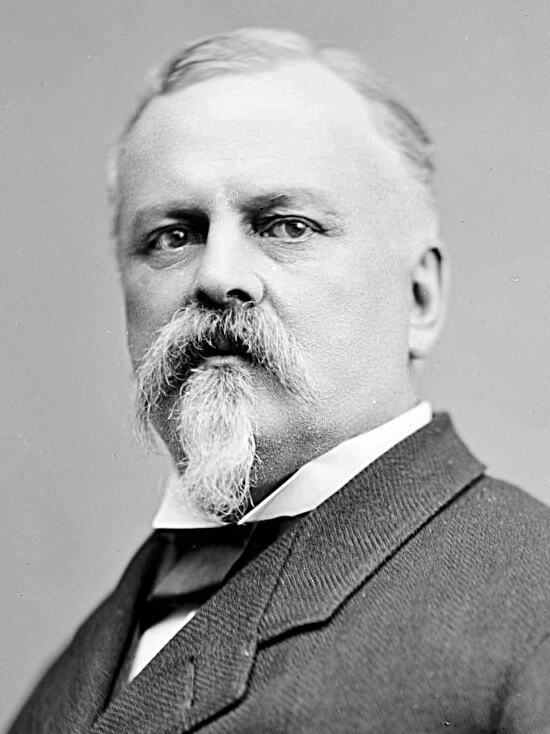
Nominee	John W. Geary	Hiester Clymer
Party	Republican	Democratic
Popular vote	307,274	290,096
Percentage	51.44%	48.56%
- County results Geary: 50–60% 60–70% 70–80% Clymer: 50–60% 60–70% 70–80%
Governor before election
Andrew Gregg Curtin
Republican
Elected Governor
John W. Geary
Republican

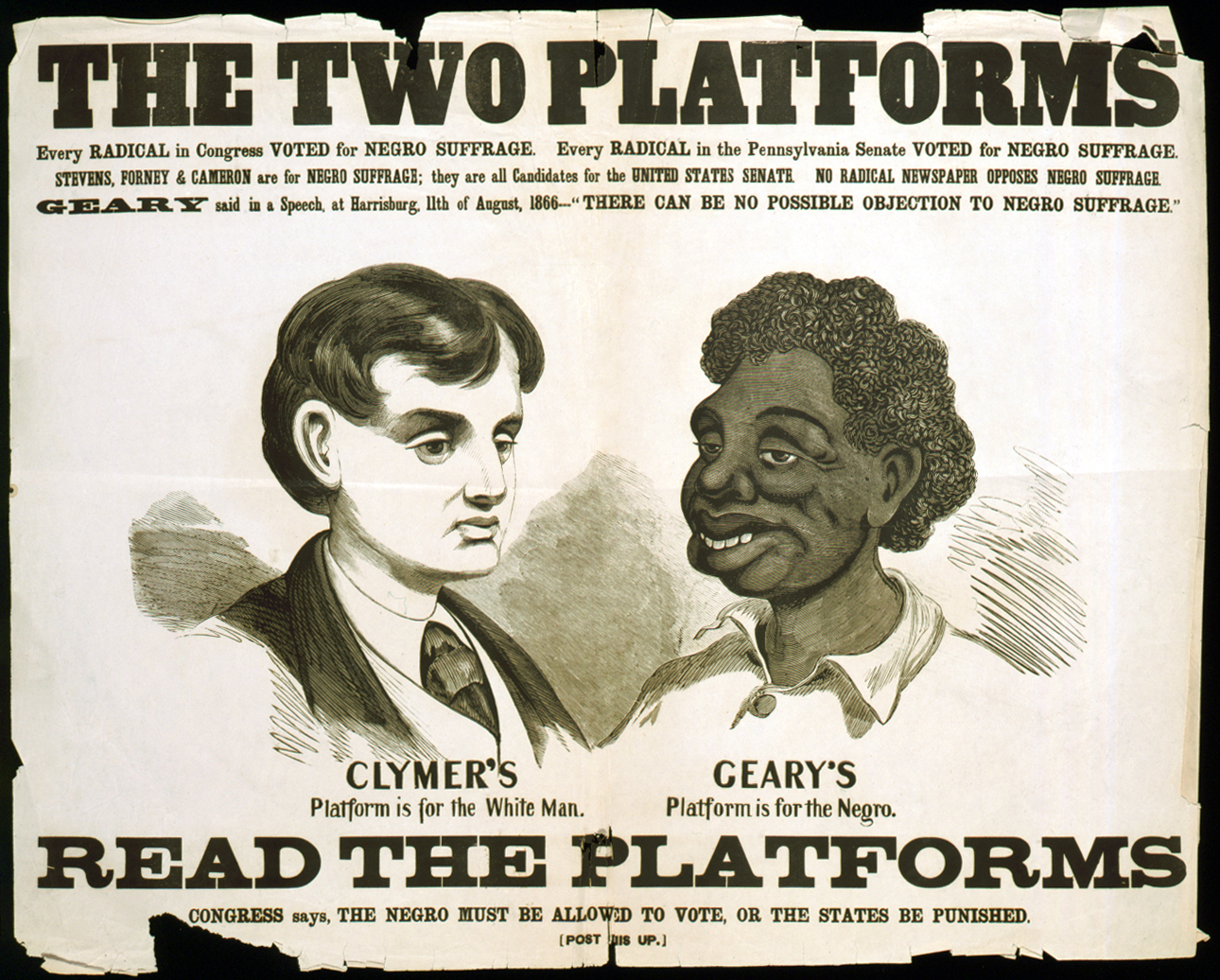
A racist pro Clymer campaign poster.

The 1866 Pennsylvania gubernatorial election occurred on October 9, 1866. Incumbent governor Andrew Gregg Curtin, a Republican, was not running for re-election.

Republican candidate John W. Geary defeated Democratic candidate Hiester Clymer to become Governor of Pennsylvania.

== Results ==
1866 Pennsylvania gubernatorial election
Party	Candidate	Votes	%
Republican	John W. Geary	307,274	51.44
Democratic	Hiester Clymer	290,096	48.56
Total votes		597,370	100.00
