= Hiester Clymer =

American politician (1827–1884)

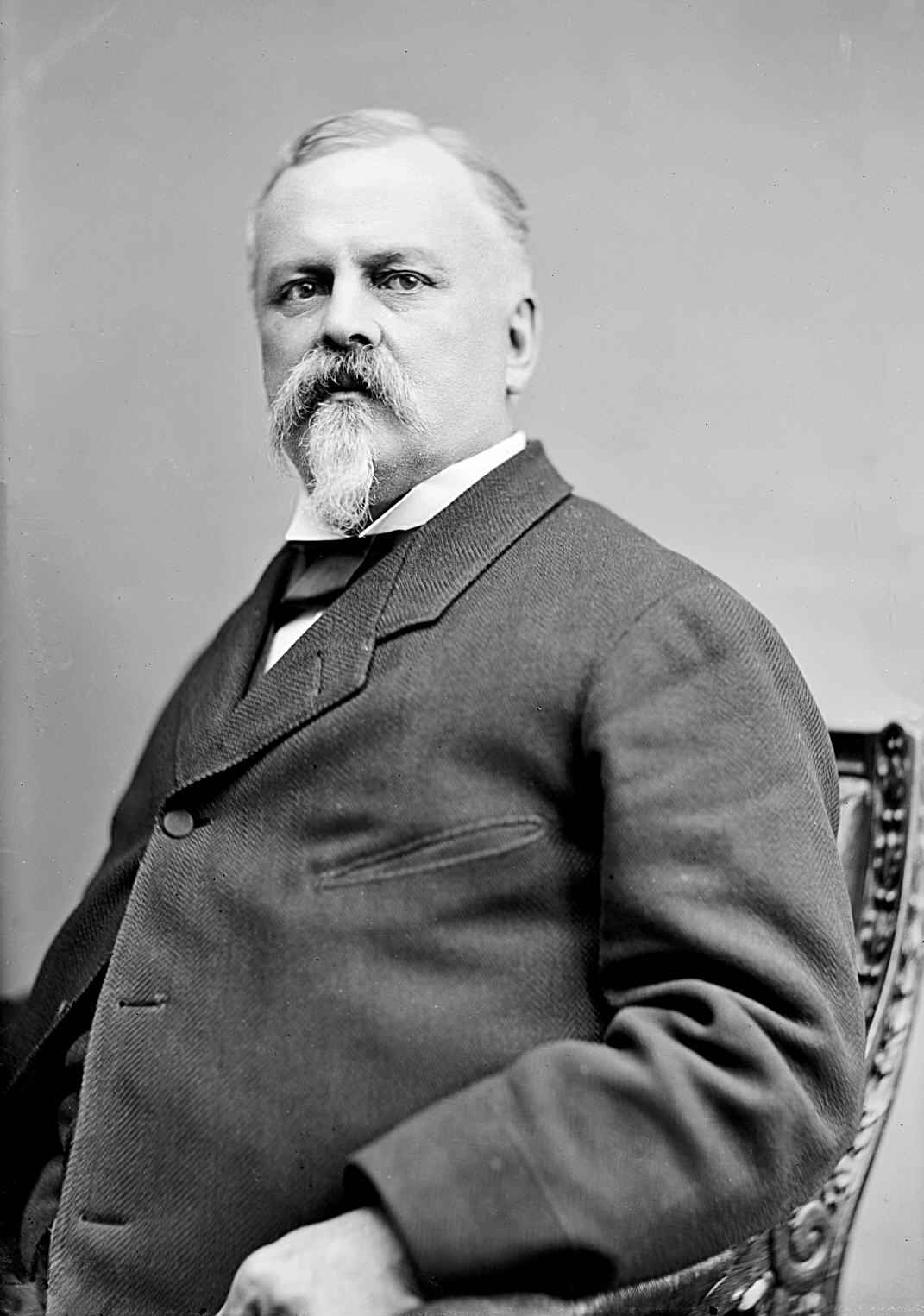
- Clymer c. 1865–80

Chairman of the House Democratic Caucus
- In office March 4, 1877 – March 3, 1879
- Speaker: Samuel J. Randall
- Preceded by: Lucius Q. C. Lamar II
- Succeeded by: John F. House

Member of the U.S. House of Representatives from Pennsylvania's 8th district
- In office March 4, 1873 – March 3, 1881
- Preceded by: James L. Getz
- Succeeded by: Daniel Ermentrout

Member of the Pennsylvania Senate, District 8
- In office 1861–1866
- Preceded by: Henry Spering Mott
- Succeeded by: Joseph Depuy Davis

Personal details
- Born: November 3, 1827 near Morgantown, Pennsylvania, U.S.
- Died: June 12, 1884 (aged 56) Reading, Pennsylvania, U.S.
- Resting place: Charles Evans Cemetery
- Party: Democratic

Hiester Clymer (November 3, 1827 – June 12, 1884) was an American politician from the state of Pennsylvania. Known for his white supremacist views, Clymer was a member of the Hiester family political dynasty and the Democratic Party. He was the nephew of William Muhlenberg Hiester and the cousin of Isaac Ellmaker Hiester. Although Clymer was born in Pennsylvania, he was adamantly opposed to Abraham Lincoln's administration and the Republican Party's prosecution of the American Civil War. Elected Pennsylvania state senator in 1860, Clymer opposed state legislation that supported the state Republican Party's war effort.

After the American Civil War ended, Clymer unsuccessfully ran for the Pennsylvania Governor's office in 1866 on a white supremacist platform against Union Major-General John W. Geary. After his election to the U.S. House of Representatives in 1872 as a Democrat, Clymer would be primarily known for his investigation of Sec. William W. Belknap's War Department in 1876. Belknap escaped conviction in a Senate impeachment trial, and had resigned his cabinet position before being impeached by the House of Representatives. Having retired from the House in 1881, Clymer served as Vice President of the Union Trust Co. of Philadelphia and president of the Clymer Iron Co. until his death in 1884.

== Early life ==
Clymer was born near Morgantown, Pennsylvania. He attended Princeton University, studied law, and was admitted to the bar in 1849. Clymer practiced law in Berks County and Schuylkill County, Pennsylvania. His brother, Edward M. Clymer, married the actress and poet, Ella Maria Dietz.

== Political career ==
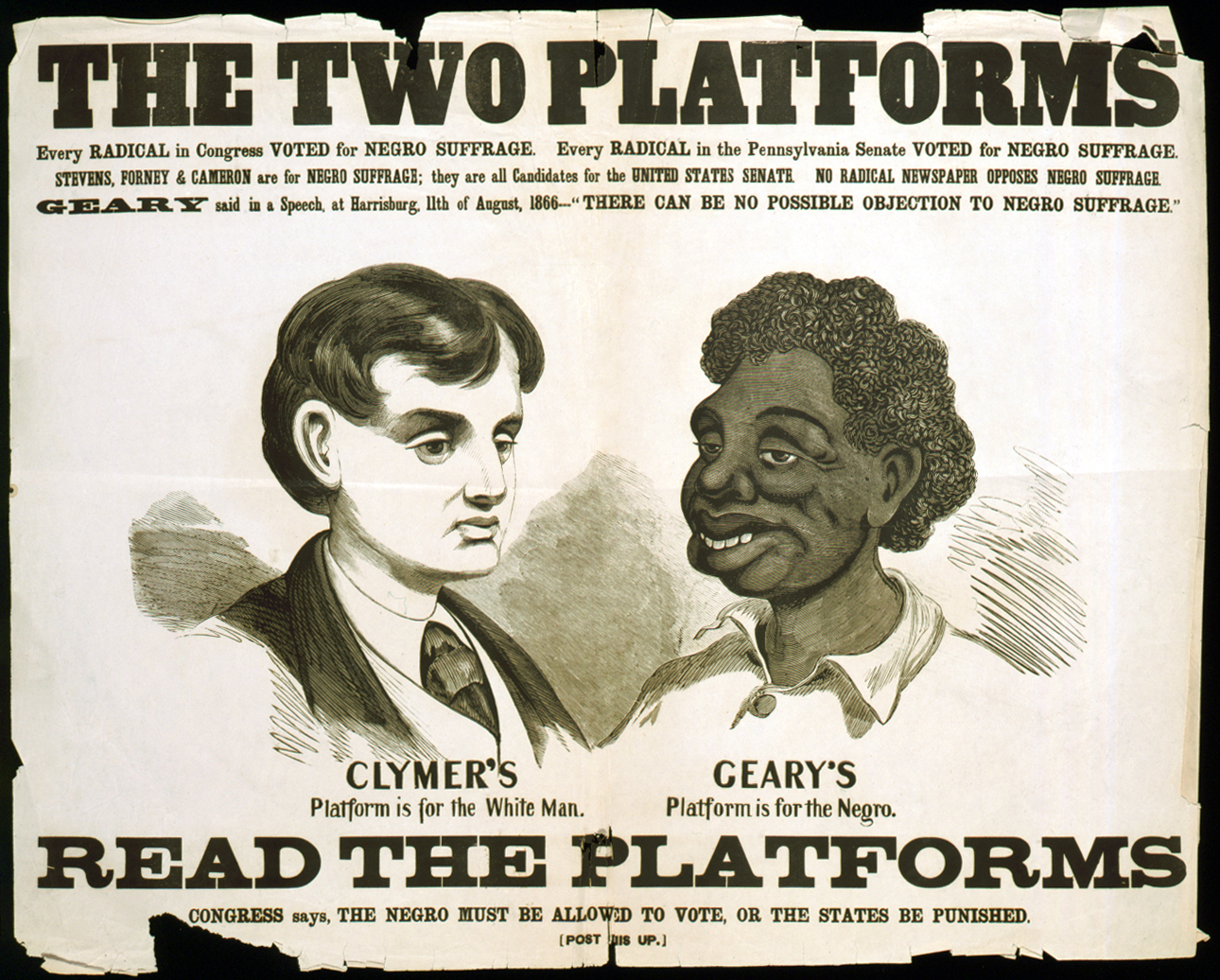
A racist pro-Clymer campaign poster for the 1866 governor's election.

He was a delegate to the national conventions of the Democratic Party in 1860 and 1868. He served in the Pennsylvania State Senate for the 8th district from 1861 to 1866. He ran unsuccessfully for Governor of Pennsylvania in 1866 on a white supremacist policy, losing to John W. Geary. In the controversial campaign, Clymer's camp produced some of the most virulently graphic racist posters and pamphlets of the decade.

=== U.S. Representative (1873–1881) ===
He was elected to the House of Representatives in 1872 and served from March 4, 1873 to March 3, 1881. While in Congress, he served on the Committee on Appropriations and the Committee on Expenditures in the Department of State, and as chairman of the Committee on Expenditures in the Department of War.

== Retirement and death ==
After he left Congress, he served as vice president of the Union Trust Company in Philadelphia and as president of the Clymer Iron Company. He died in Reading, Pennsylvania, on June 12, 1884, by suicide as a result of what one newspaper account called "financial embarrassment." He is interred at the Charles Evans Cemetery.

Party political offices
Preceded by George Washington Woodward	Democratic nominee for Governor of Pennsylvania; 1866	Succeeded by Asa Packer
Pennsylvania State Senate
Preceded by Henry Spering Mott	Member of the Pennsylvania Senate, 8th district 1861–1866	Succeeded by Joseph Depuy Davis
U.S. House of Representatives
Preceded by James L. Getz	Member of the U.S. House of Representatives from Pennsylvania's 8th congressional district 1873–1881	Succeeded by Daniel Ermentrout
