= Hiester family =

German-American family

The Hiester family is a German American family. Many of their members were involved in 19th-century American and Pennsylvanian politics. The family still has relatives alive today with widely ranging professions.

Noted members of the family include:

- John Hiester (1745–1821), US Congressman
- Daniel Hiester (1747–1804), US Congressman
- Gabriel Hiester (1749–1824), Pennsylvania Assembly member
- Joseph Hiester (1752–1832), US Congressman and Governor of Pennsylvania
- Daniel Hiester the younger (1774–1834), US Congressman
- William Hiester (1790–1853), US Congressman
- William Muhlenberg Hiester (1818–1878), Pennsylvania state senator
- Isaac Ellmaker Hiester (1824–1871), US Congressman
- Hiester Clymer (1827–1884), US Congressman

The Hiesters were related to the Muhlenberg family.
