= James Bishop (New Jersey politician) =

American politician

Member of the U.S. House of Representatives from New Jersey's 3rd district
- In office March 4, 1855 – March 3, 1857
- Preceded by: Samuel Lilly
- Succeeded by: Garnett Adrain

Member of the New Jersey General Assembly
- In office 1849-1850

Personal details
- Born: May 11, 1816 New Brunswick, New Jersey, US
- Died: May 10, 1895 (age 78) Morristown, New Jersey, US
- Party: Whig
- Profession: Politician

James Bishop (May 11, 1816 – May 10, 1895) was an American Whig politician, who represented New Jersey's 3rd congressional district in the United States House of Representatives from 1855 to 1857.

== Biography ==
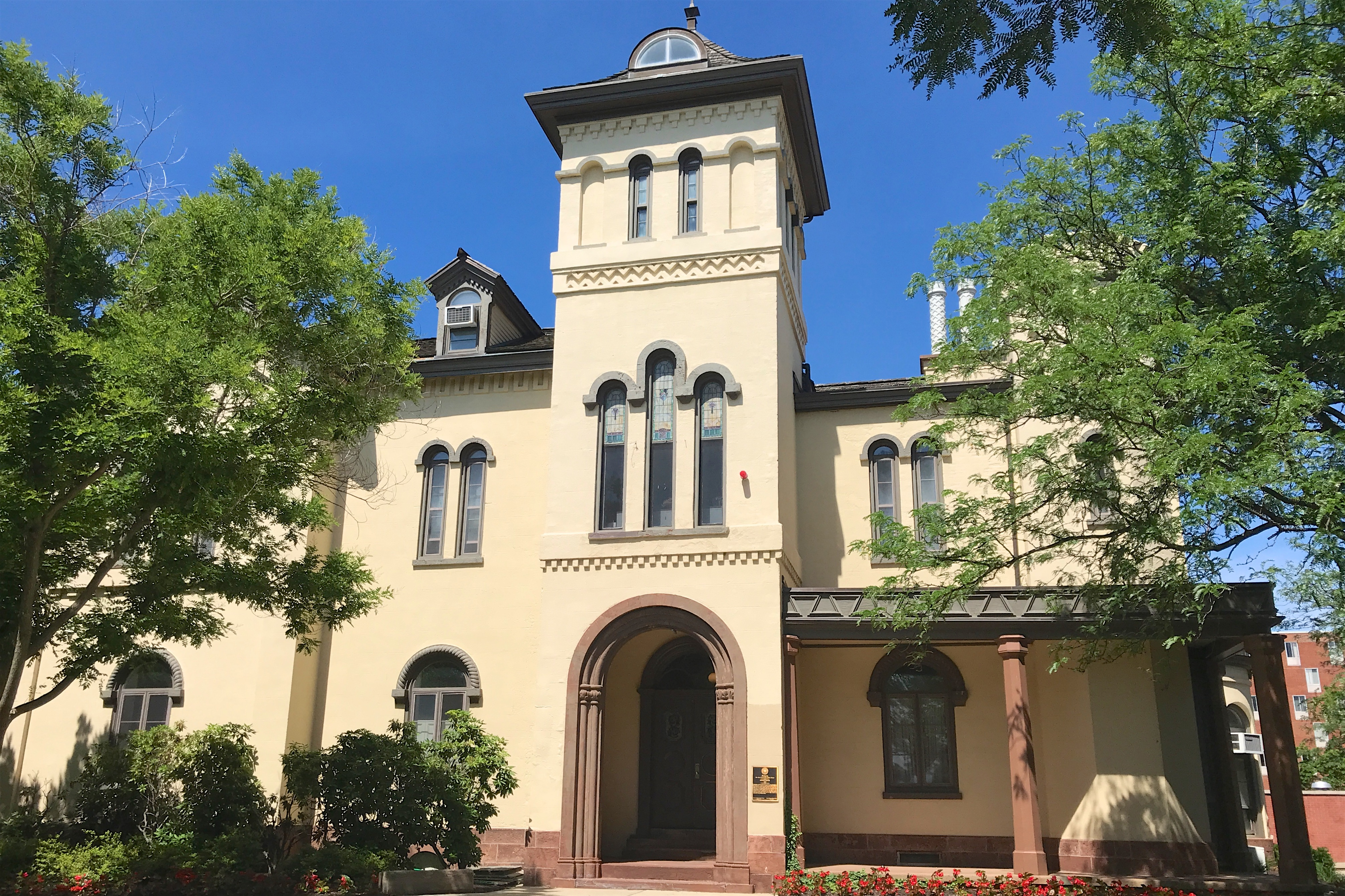
Bishop House, on the campus of Rutgers University

Bishop was born in New Brunswick, New Jersey on May 11, 1816. He attended Spaulding School and Rutgers Preparatory School in New Brunswick. He engaged in mercantile pursuits in New Brunswick, and was a member of the New Jersey General Assembly in 1849 and 1850.

Bishop was elected as a Whig candidate to the Thirty-fourth Congress, serving in office from March 4, 1855 – March 3, 1857, but was an unsuccessful candidate for reelection in 1856 to the Thirty-fifth Congress.

Bishop House, erected in 1852 and located at 115 College Avenue in New Brunswick, is a 42-room mansion that constitutes a fine representation of the Italianate style of architecture, was built for Bishop. The house was placed on the National Register of Historic Places in 1976. After leaving Congress, he was prominent in the rubber trade in New York City. He was chief of the bureau of labor statistics of New Jersey from 1878 to 1893 and was a resident of Trenton. He died at Kemble Hall, near Morristown, New Jersey on May 10, 1895, and was interred in Elmwood Cemetery in North Brunswick.

U.S. House of Representatives
Preceded by Samuel Lilly	Member of the U.S. House of Representatives from New Jersey's 3rd congressional district March 4, 1855-March 3, 1857	Succeeded by Garnett Adrain
