= Senator Hester =

Senator Hester may refer to:

- Bart Hester (born 1977), Arkansas State Senate
- Jack W. Hester (1929–1999), Iowa State Senate
- Katie Fry Hester (born 1974), Maryland State Senate
- Lawrence L. Hester (1891–1973), South Carolina State Senate

== See also ==
- Senator Hiester (disambiguation)
