= Absalom Fowler House =

Historic house in Arkansas, United States

- U.S. National Register of Historic Places
- U.S. Historic district – Contributing property
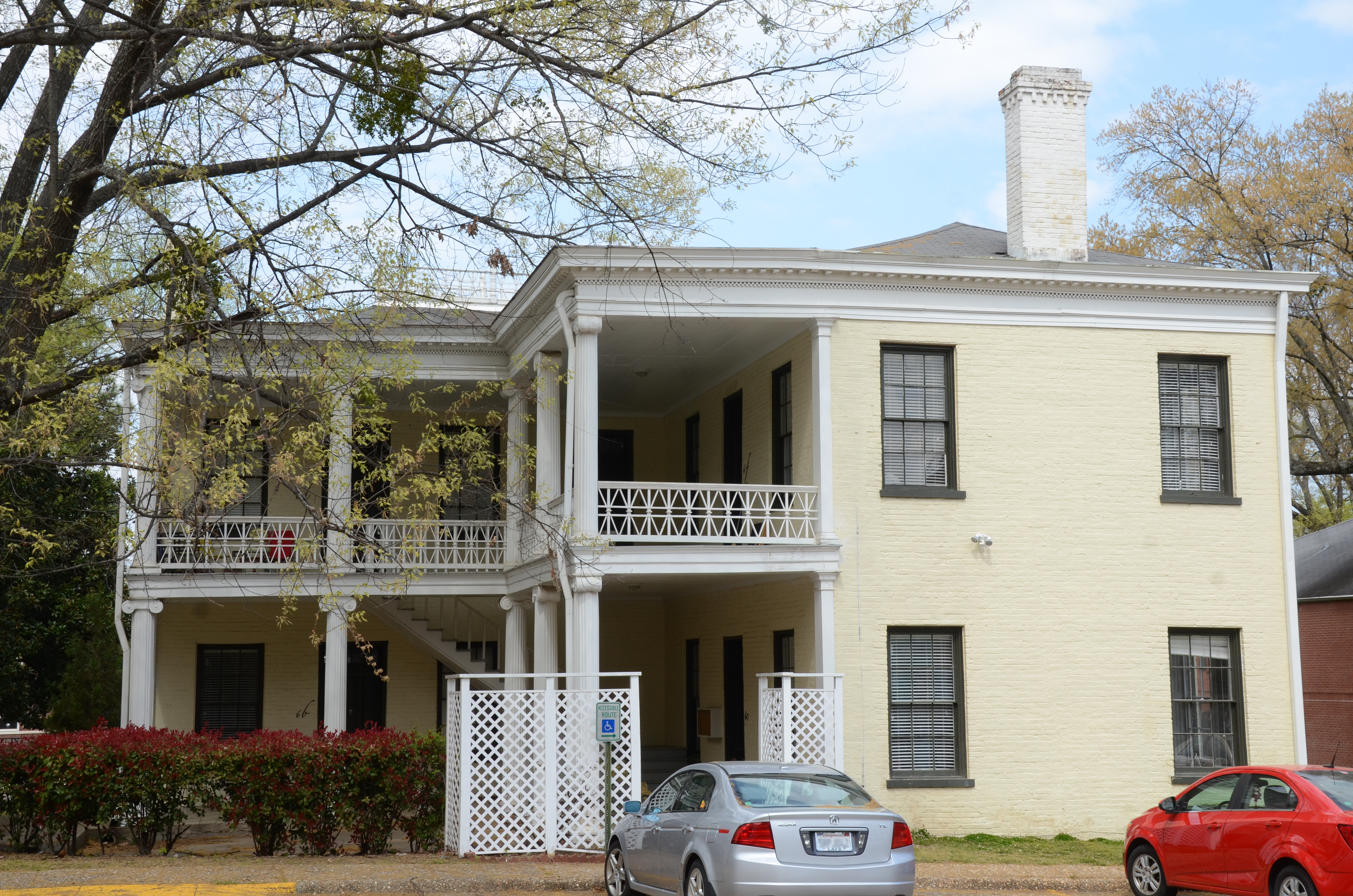

- Location within Arkansas Location within the United States
- Location: 503 E. 6th St., Little Rock, Arkansas
- Coordinates: 34°44′30″N 92°16′41″W
- Area: less than one acre
- Built: 1839
- Architect: Absalom Fowler
- Part of: MacArthur Park Historic District (ID77000269)
- NRHP reference No.: 73000387

Significant dates
- Added to NRHP: June 4, 1973
- Designated CP: July 25, 1977

The Absalom Fowler House is a historic house at 503 East 6th Street in Little Rock, Arkansas. It is a two-story brick building, with a hip roof and a front portico supported by fluted Ionic columns and topped by a balustrade. The building is encircled by an entablature with modillion blocks and an unusual double row of dentil moulding giving a checkerboard effect. The house was built in about 1840 by Absalom Fowler, a lawyer prominent in the state's early history. The house is now surrounded by a multi-building apartment complex.

The house was listed on the National Register of Historic Places in 1973.

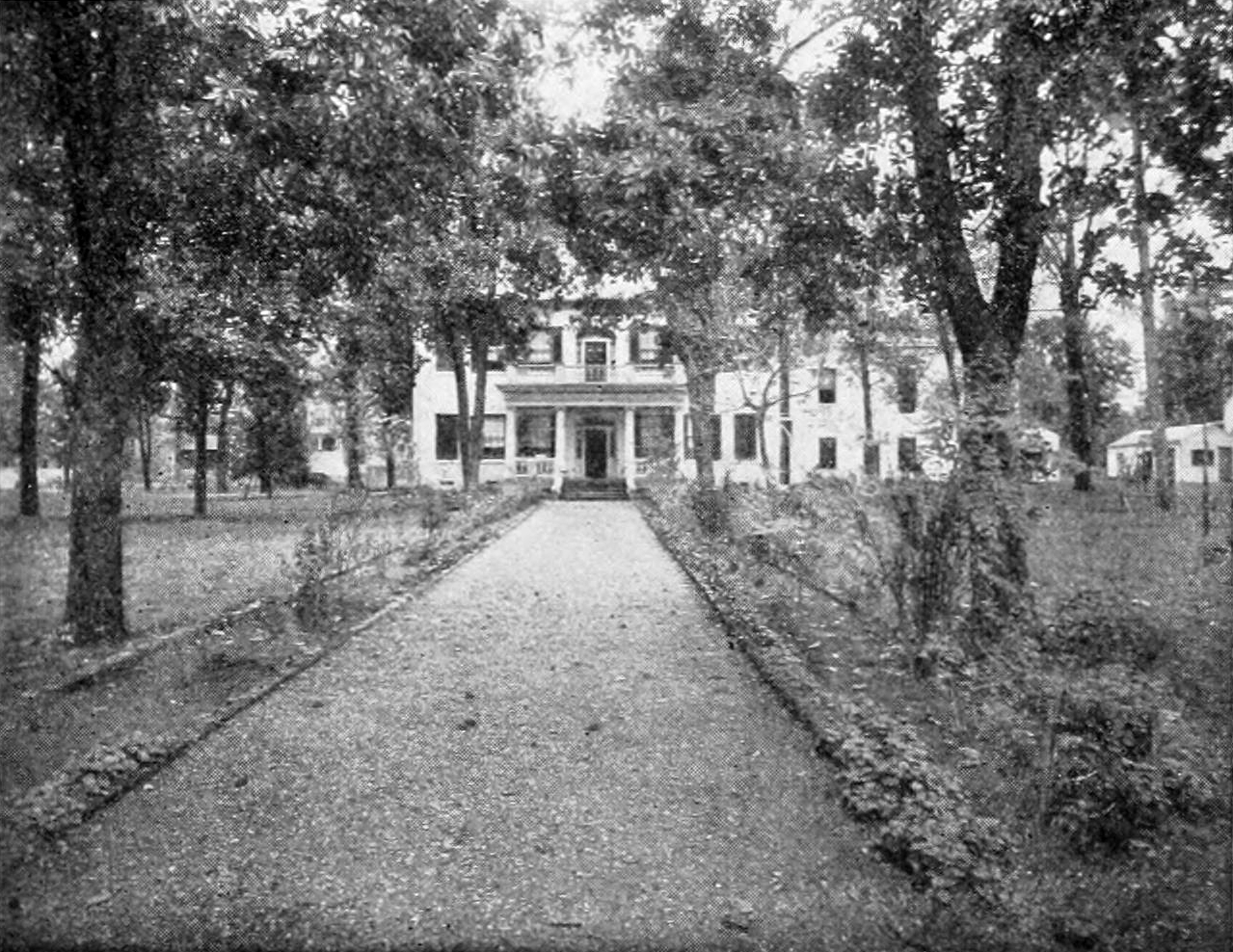
Absalom Fowler House, circa 1904

== See also ==
- National Register of Historic Places listings in Little Rock, Arkansas
