= Bishop House (New Brunswick, New Jersey) =

- James Bishop House
- U.S. National Register of Historic Places
- New Jersey Register of Historic Places
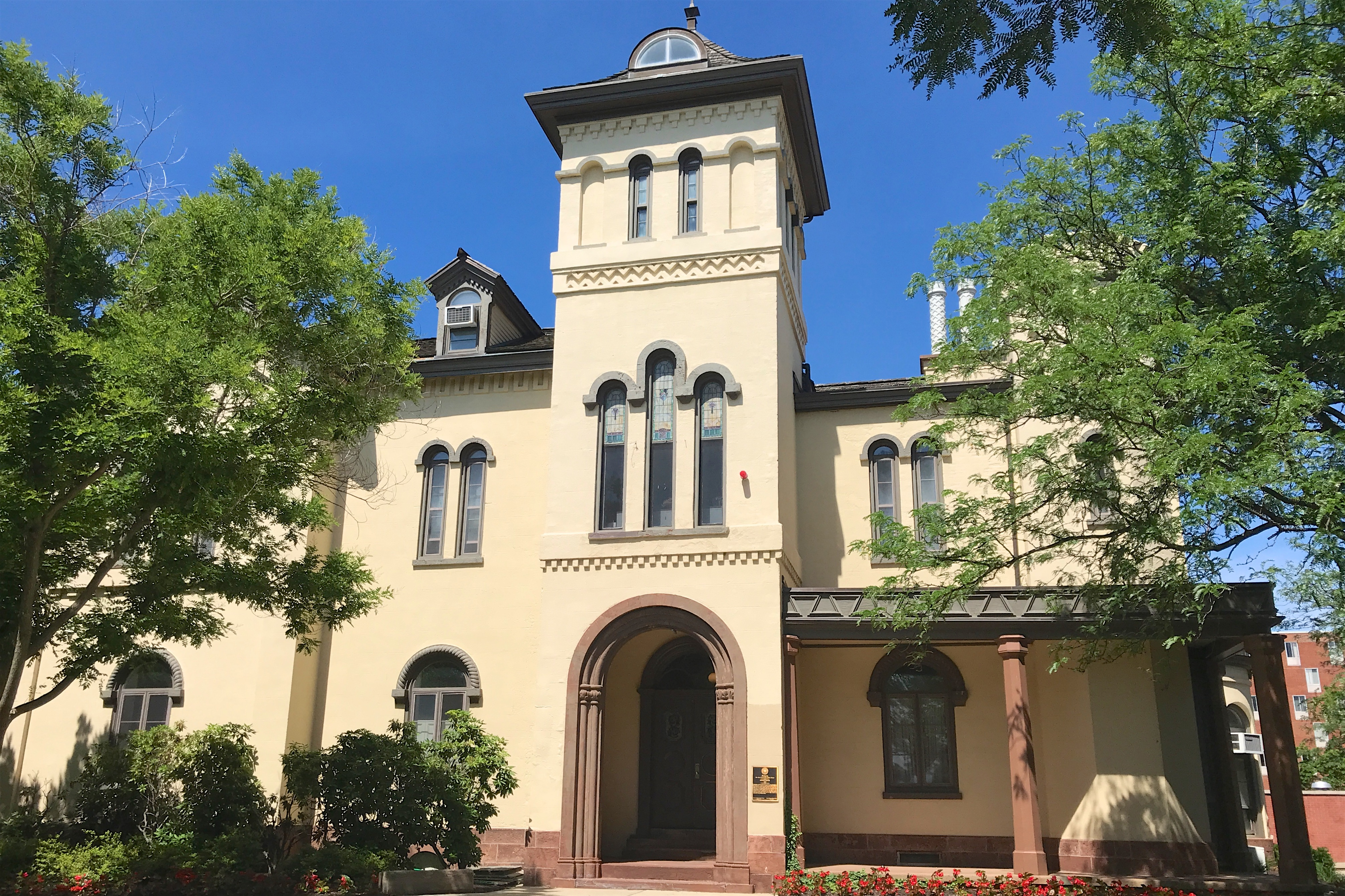
- Bishop House, 2018

- Location within Middlesex County, New Jersey Location within New Jersey Location within the United States
- Location: College Avenue; New Brunswick, New Jersey
- Coordinates: 40°30′11″N 74°27′00″W
- Area: 0.3 acres (0.12 ha)
- Built: 1852
- Built by: Isziah Rolfe
- Architectural style: Italianate
- NRHP reference No.: 76001162
- NJRHP No.: 1855

Significant dates
- Designated NRHP: July 12, 1976
- Designated NJRHP: January 19, 1976

The James Bishop House, known as the Bishop House, is a historic building on the College Avenue campus of Rutgers University in New Brunswick, New Jersey. Bishop House was erected in 1852 for James Bishop, a prominent businessman and politician from New Brunswick in the latter half of 19th century. Located off of and facing College Avenue, the Bishop House is an example of an Italianate, or "Italian Villa" style mansion, popular from the 1850s to late 1870s in New Brunswick. Due to the building's significant associations with architecture, education, industry, politics and religion, it was added to the National Register of Historic Places on July 12, 1976.

== History ==
The Bishop House was named in honor of James Bishop. Bishop was a politician at the local, state, and federal levels in the 1850s through the 1890s. After the Panic of 1873, Bishop was forced to file for bankruptcy, leading to the firing of his 18 servants and sale of his mansion to Mahlon C. Martin.

The building was sold to Rutgers University in 1925. It was used as the residence for the Dean of Men and his family until 1934. After 1934, the interior was altered to contain classrooms and offices. This remains its current use. The building still contains its original 42 rooms despite alterations made.

== Gallery ==
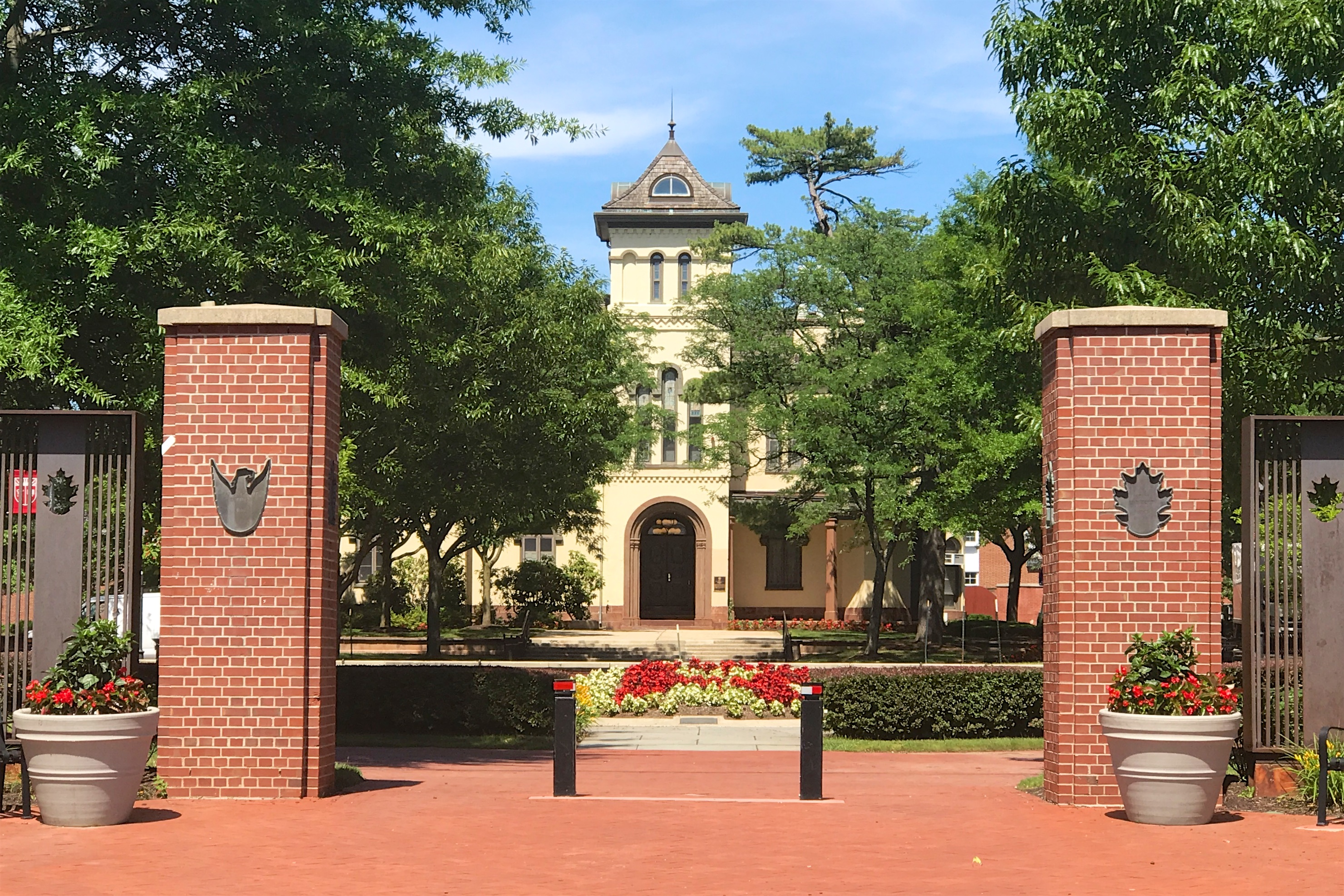
View from College Avenue

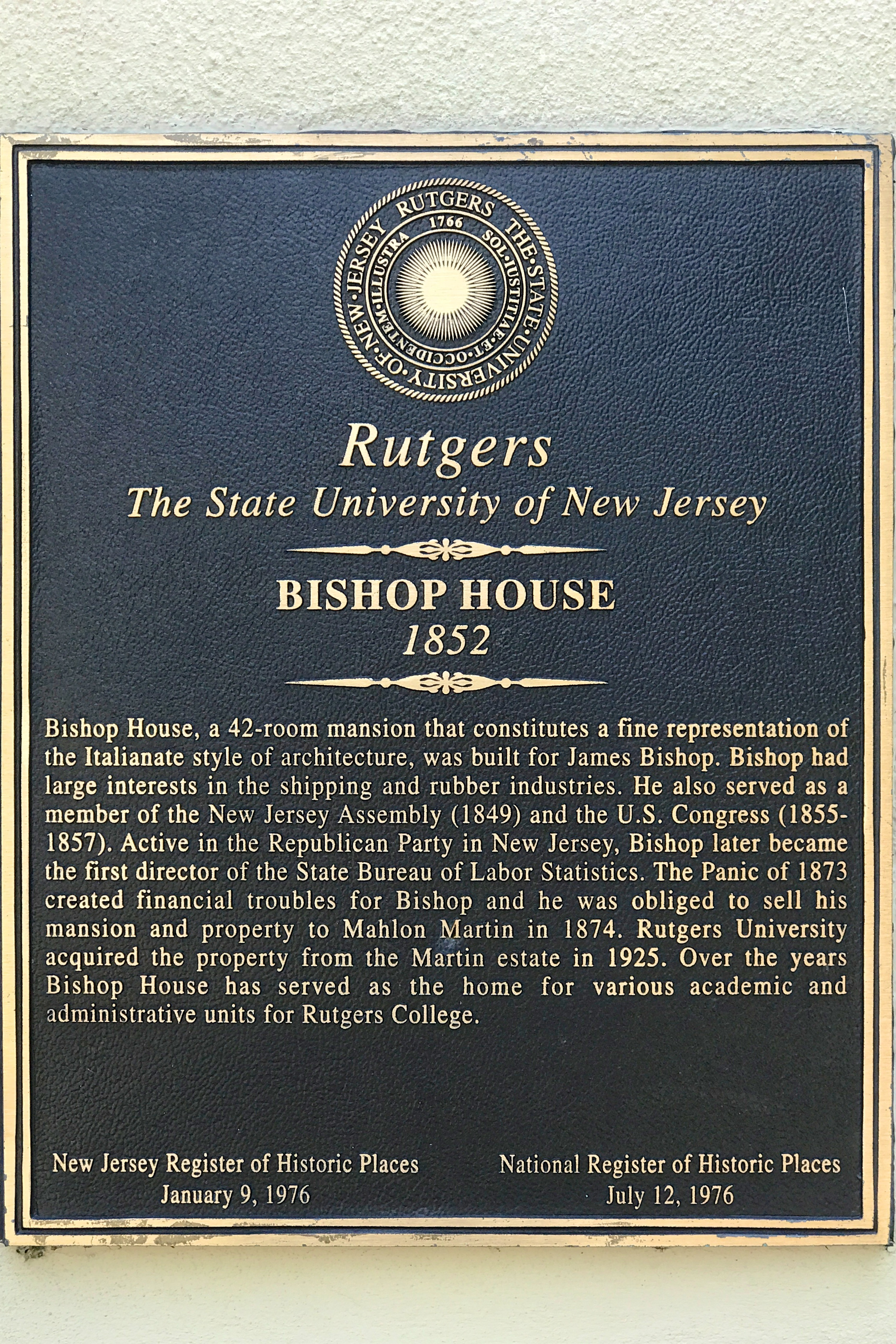
NRHP plaque
