= J. Glancy Jones =

American politician (1811–1878)

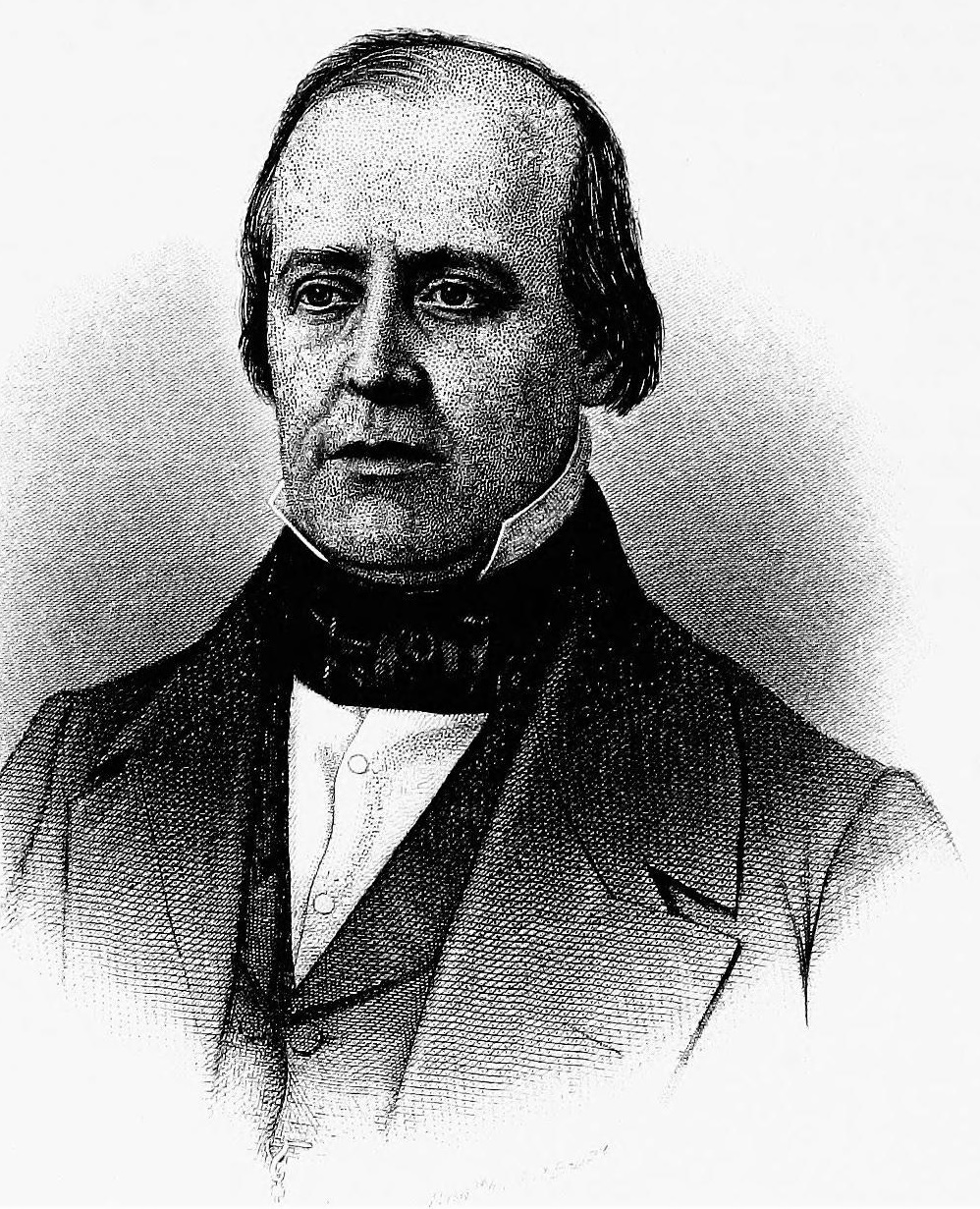

4th United States Minister to the Austrian Empire
- In office December 15, 1858 – November 14, 1861
- President: James Buchanan; Abraham Lincoln
- Preceded by: Henry R. Jackson
- Succeeded by: John Lothrop Motley

Member of the U.S. House of Representatives from Pennsylvania's 8th district
- In office February 4, 1854 – October 30, 1858
- Preceded by: Henry Augustus Muhlenberg
- Succeeded by: William High Keim

Member of the U.S. House of Representatives from Pennsylvania's 9th district
- In office March 4, 1851 – March 3, 1853
- Preceded by: William Strong
- Succeeded by: Isaac Ellmaker Hiester

Personal details
- Born: Jehu Glancy Jones; October 7, 1811 Caernarvon Township, Pennsylvania, U.S.
- Died: March 24, 1878 (aged 66) Reading, Pennsylvania, U.S.
- Resting place: Charles Evans Cemetery
- Party: Democratic
- Education: Kenyon College

Jehu Glancy Jones (October 7, 1811 – March 24, 1878) was a Democratic member of the U.S. House of Representatives from Pennsylvania. Often called Glancy, he was a top adviser on Democratic Party affairs to his close friend James Buchanan, especially when President-elect Buchanan was picking his cabinet in 1856-1857. After he was defeated for reelection, Buchanan appointed him Ambassador to the Austrian Empire.

== Biography ==
J. Glancy Jones was born in Caernarvon Township, Pennsylvania. He attended Kenyon College, studied theology and was ordained to the ministry of the Episcopal Church in 1835 and withdrew in 1841. He later studied law, was admitted to the bar in Georgia in 1841 and commenced practice at Easton, Pennsylvania. He was district attorney for Berks County, Pennsylvania, from 1847 to 1849.

=== Convention delegate ===
He was a delegate to the Democratic State conventions in 1848, 1849, and 1855, and served as president in 1855. He was a delegate to the Democratic National Convention in 1848 and 1856 and served as vice president in 1848.

=== Congress ===
Jones was elected as a Democrat to the Thirty-second Congress. He declined to be a candidate for renomination in 1852. He was elected to the Thirty-third Congress to fill the vacancy caused by the death of Henry A. Muhlenberg. He was reelected to the Thirty-fourth and Thirty-fifth Congresses. He served as chairman of the United States House Committee on Ways and Means during the Thirty-fifth Congress. He was an unsuccessful candidate for election in 1858, and resigned October 30, 1858.

=== Later career and death ===
On November 1, 1858 he was appointed Minister Resident to the Austrian Empire by President James Buchanan, and served from December 15, 1858 to November 14, 1861. After his service he resumed the practice of law, and died in Reading, Pennsylvania, in 1878. Interment in Reading's Charles Evans Cemetery.

=== Legacy ===
In terms of his legacy to American history, biographer Michael Todd Landis states:

Leading Northern Democrats such as Jones and Buchanan were not romantic defenders of working men, as some scholars have claimed; nor were they moderates striving to save the Union from extreme sectionalism. Rather, they were proslavery activists whose willful actions had direct and disastrous effects on the nation. Their policies enraged free-state voters and caused the fatal split in the Democratic Party that resulted in Lincoln’s election, which, in turn, triggered disunion. They were culpable and responsible—a fact that should not be forgotten or overlooked.

== Sources ==
- United States Congress. "J. Glancy Jones (id: J000234)". Biographical Directory of the United States Congress.
- The Political Graveyard

U.S. House of Representatives
Preceded by William Strong	Member of the U.S. House of Representatives from Pennsylvania's 9th congressional district 1851 - 1853	Succeeded by Isaac E. Hiester
Preceded by Henry A. Muhlenberg	Member of the U.S. House of Representatives from Pennsylvania's 8th congressional district 1854 - 1858	Succeeded by William H. Keim
Diplomatic posts
Preceded by Henry R. Jackson	U.S. Minister to the Austrian Empire; 1858 - 1861	Succeeded by Anson Burlingame
