= Gabriel Hiester =

American politician

Gabriel Hiester (1749–1824) was an American political and military leader from the time of the American Revolution to the early-19th century, and was a member of the Hiester Family political dynasty. A brother of John Hiester and Daniel Hiester, he was a Jeffersonian Republican who served in Pennsylvania's unicameral Assembly, House of Representatives and State Senate, representing Berks and Dauphin counties.

He also practiced chattel slavery, according to early nineteenth century newspapers.

== Biography ==
Gabriel Hiester was born in Bern Township, Berks County, Pennsylvania on July 17, 1749, the son of German immigrants Daniel and Rosanna (Hager) Hiester. He received his early education at the school associated with the Bern Church.

As an adult, he took up farming, married Elizabeth Bausman and fathered six children: Gabriel, Jonathan, William, Jacob, Mary, and Elizabeth.

According to early nineteenth century newspapers, Hiester enslaved at least two young Black men during his farming years. The Lancaster Intelligencer published the following advertisement of Hiester's in its September 20, 1800 edition:

"Ten Dollars Reward
RAN-AWAY from the subscriber on Wednesday, the 10th inst. a Mulatta lad, named SIGHE, about 19 or 20 years of age, 5 feet 8 or 9 inches high, stout made, light complexion and generally wears his hair queued. Had on and took along with him 2 shirts, 1 pair gray tow trousers, 1 pair do. stripe, 1 pair [two unintelligible words], small clothes line with leather, 2 wool hats, 1 pair shoes newly patched and soled, besides sundry other clothes which cannot be ascertained. Whoever apprehends said runaway and secures him in any jail shall have the above reward and reasonable charges if brought home.
GABRIEL HIESTER.
Barn township, Berks county.
September 11, 1800.
P.S. All persons are hereby notified not to harbor said runaway."

Philadelphia's Aurora General Advertiser then published this advertisement of Hiester's on the front page of its June 24, 1806 edition:

"TWENTY DOLLARS REWARD.
RAN AWAY from the subscriber, living in Berne township, Berks county, state of Pennsylvania, on the night of the 7th inst. a mulatto man named LISH, about twenty-five years of age, five feet 8 or 9 inches high, stout built, smooth face, has a scar occasioned by a cut on his instep; is fond of spiritous liquors and when a little intoxicated his eyelids appear heavy, and his tongue thick; a great boaster of his activity, strength and capacity for working; his wool is short, being fresh shorn excepting a little on the back part of his head — Had on and took with him, a dark brown cloth coat, swansdown jacket, ribbed velvet pantaloons, and other clothes not known.
Whoever takes up and secures said runaway, so that the subscriber gets him, shall have the above reward, and reasonable charges paid if brought home.
GABRIEL HIESTER.
Berne township, Berks county,
June 21, 1806."

=== Political and military career ===
A delegate to the Pennsylvania Constitutional Convention on July 15, 1776 and an American Revolutionary War Patriot who served as a major with the Pennsylvania Militia from 1776-1777, Hiester spent the majority of his adult life in public service.

On April 24, 1778, he was appointed as a Justice in the Court of Common Pleas. He then served as a member of Pennsylvania's unicameral Assembly in 1782 and from 1787 to 1789. A delegate to the Pennsylvania Constitutional Convention in 1790, he was subsequently elected to the Pennsylvania House of Representatives, serving from 1791 to 1796 and, again in the House, from 1802 to 1804 before being elected to the Pennsylvania Senate, a seat he held from 1804 to 1812.

== Death ==
Hiester died on his family's farm in Bern Township, Berks County, Pennsylvania on September 1, 1824. He was seventy-two years old.
