= Isaac Ellmaker Hiester =

American politician

Isaac E. Hiester
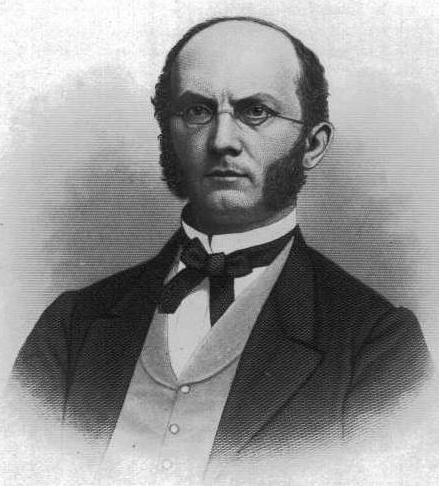

Member of the U.S. House of Representatives from Pennsylvania's 9th district
- In office March 4, 1853 – March 3, 1855
- Preceded by: Jehu Glancy Jones
- Succeeded by: Anthony Ellmaker Roberts

Personal details
- Born: Isaac Ellmaker Hiester; May 29, 1824 New Holland, Pennsylvania, U.S.
- Died: February 6, 1871 (aged 46) Lancaster, Pennsylvania, U.S.
- Party: Whig

Isaac Ellmaker Hiester (May 29, 1824 – February 6, 1871) was a nineteenth century American political leader. A member of the Hiester Family political dynasty, he was also descended from the prominent Ellmaker family. The son of William Hiester, he was also a cousin of Hiester Clymer.

A century after his death, he was memorialized by American newspapers as a "distinguished Pennsylvania congressman and jurist."

== Biography ==
Isaac E. Hiester was born in New Holland, Lancaster County, Pennsylvania on May 29, 1824. He graduated from Yale University in 1842, and while at college helped to found the Scroll and Key Society. He then studied law, and was admitted to the bar in 1845, afterwards practicing in Lancaster, Pennsylvania.

In 1848, the Governor of Pennsylvania appointed Hiester as Deputy Attorney General (District Attorney) for Lancaster County; he held the post until 1851.

In 1852, he successfully ran for a seat in the United States House of Representatives as a Whig. He was defeated for reelection in 1854, and ran unsuccessfully as a Democrat in 1856. Hiester then returned to his law practice.

He supported the Union during the American Civil War, was a Delegate to the 1868 Democratic National Convention, and also represented Pennsylvania on the Democratic National Committee.

== Illness, death, burial and tributes ==
On January 28, 1871, Isaac E. Hiester suffered a stroke which left him paralyzed. Lingering "in a semi-conscious condition, never speaking, but being able to recognize the friends who gathered around his bed in anxious solicitude," he died at his home in Lancaster on February 6, 1871.

Within a day of his death, multiple tributes were written about him by attorneys, elected officials and other civic leaders, and published in local newspapers. More than fifty attorneys also attended the Lancaster Bar Association on February 7, 1871, "the largest of the kind, except that which assembled on the decease of President Buchanan, ever witnessed in Lancaster." Thomas E. Franklin, Esq., formerly Attorney General of the Commonwealth of Pennsylvania, was the first to speak, noting:

"I feel utterly incapable, sir, of performing, properly, the grave duty that I feel pressing upon me. It is a mournful task for me to rise here and announce to you, who knew him so well and esteemed him so highly, the sudden decease of Isaac E. Hiester.... The unexpected blow unnerves and overpowers me.... His was the highest sense of honor, his was the purest integrity.... He was generous without a spark of ostentation in his charity; he could not see suffering without relieving it."

Oliver James Dickey, a member of the U.S. House of Representatives, said of Hiester:

"The descendant on his father's side of one of the oldest and best German families of the State, and of another almost as old and as well-known on the part of his mother; an only son ... born to wealth and highly educated, this great country looked to see what career Isaac E. Hiester would carve out for himself.... His word was as good as his bond, and no man's bond was better. In his professional career he adopted the highest standard of professional morals, and he lived religiously up to his creed. No man's cause was hindered, or delayed from malice, or for lucre by him. He kept his lightest promises sacred, and was especially careful to do so if they might be to the advantage of his opponent or to his own prejudice.... He always brought complete preparation to the trial of his causes, and was equally distinguished for that whether he appeared before a jury or a court of the last resort.... He was a worthy son of that great German race, which has given to Pennsylvania its best Governors, and which has converted this wide county, and almost the whole eastern part of this State, into a garden."

Samuel H. Reynolds, former Lancaster city solicitor, said:

"I cannot remain silent beside his open coffin. He possessed a peculiar eloquence which was calculated to sway both Court and jury, was a man of the highest honor and elevated character. In private life he displayed all the finer feelings of human nature. This Bar has met with irreparable loss in the death of Mr. Hiester.... He needs no eulogy. His virtues will outlive the marble which may mark his last resting place, and his memory will be preserved when the pillars of this temple of justice, in which his eloquent voice was so often heard, shall have crumbled into dust."

During the fall of 1871, a new lectern was installed in his memory at St. James Episcopal Church in Lancaster. It was described by local newspapers as "one of the finest specimens in sculpture in wood yet executed in this country," and featured an "eagle resting upon a massive pillar, with elaborate capital of black oak."

== Notes ==
U.S. House of Representatives
Preceded by J. Glancy Jones	Member of the U.S. House of Representatives from Pennsylvania's 9th congressional district 1853-1855	Succeeded by Anthony E. Roberts
