= Anthony E. Roberts =

American politician (1803–1885)

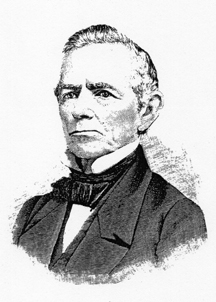

Anthony Ellmaker Roberts (October 29, 1803 – January 23, 1885), was an American politician, member of the United States House of Representatives from 1855 to 1859, an abolitionist and close associate of Thaddeus Stevens.

== Early life ==
Anthony Ellmaker Roberts was born near Barneston Station in Chester County, Pennsylvania. He was the son of John Roberts and Mary Ellmaker. His family moved to Lancaster County in 1804. Growing up, Roberts received the limited education available from the local common school. In 1816, at the age of thirteen, Roberts began working for his uncle Isaac Ellmaker as a clerk in Isaac's country store in New Holland; at the age of twenty, Anthony received a share in the ownership of the store, and continued in the business until 1839.

== Early political career ==
On October 8, 1839, Roberts was elected on the Democratic Antimasonic ticket as Sheriff of Lancaster County. He then moved to Lancaster City, where he served his three-year term as sheriff from 1839 to 1842. In the fall of 1843, Roberts ran for a seat on the Twenty-Eighth Congress on the Anti-Masonic Party ticket, but he was defeated by the Whig Party candidate, Jeremiah Brown. On May 16, 1850, Roberts was appointed by US President Zachary Taylor as the United States Marshal for the Eastern District of Pennsylvania, a position he held until May 29, 1853.

== Resistance at Christiana ==
=== The incident ===
Just a few months after Roberts was appointed Marshal, the United States Congress passed the Fugitive Slave Law as part of the Compromise of 1850. The law put Roberts in a difficult position as a Marshal who was also an abolitionist, because he was expected to enforce laws promoting the return of runaway slaves to the South or risk a fine of one thousand US$ per incident.

After many tense incidents in the north between local communities harboring runaway slaves and southern slave owners seeking to reclaim their "property". An incident arose in which blood was shed: on September 11, 1851, Edward Gorsuch, a Maryland slave owner, came to Christiana in Lancaster County to reclaim a runaway slave named Nelson Ford. A group of runaway slaves in Christiana, headed by William Parker, had formed a vigilante group to protect one another from any attempts by Southern slave owners to enslave them again.

Edward Gorsuch soon learned that his former slave was staying with William Parker. He went to William Parker's house along with a small posse to take back the slave he claimed to own. The fugitive slaves, led by William Parker, sounded an alarm, which summoned other blacks as well as some local white abolitionists. As Edward Gorsuch advanced to reclaim his "property", William Parker led an active resistance, and a small battle ensued. One hour later the incident was over and Gorsuch lay dead.

Two days later, Anthony Roberts was on the scene with a detachment of Philadelphia police. Those who participated in the resistance, including the white bystanders, were arrested and put on trial for treason, beginning with Castner Hanway, a white man who was not a Quaker but was sympathetic to Quaker ideals. Thaddeus Stevens took on the case as the defense attorney, while Roberts was responsible for keeping those on trial in custody.

=== Involvement in the slaves' trial ===
The prosecuting attorneys held two blacks in "voluntary" custody for the case. These men discovered Edward Gorsuch's plot to reclaim his slaves the day before the resistance took place and warned William Parker. The prosecution was planning to use their testimony to prove that the Christiana incident was an organized effort to resist the laws of the United States. Two weeks before the trial began, however, the two blacks mysteriously disappeared from custody. The prosecution hinted that Marshal Roberts had let them go, since there was no evidence of a broken lock or use of force in their escape. The defense denied the accusation.

Twenty-one years later, William Still, the black leader of the Philadelphia Underground Railroad, revealed the truth. While in custody, the two black men had been identified by their owner as runaway slaves. Still reports that the two men did indeed find a "true friend and ally" in Roberts. Still clarified the matter further when he wrote in response to the suspicions of the prosecuting attorney with respect to Anthony Roberts: "To add now, that those suspicions were founded on fact, will doubtless do him no damage".

Roberts did other things within his power to sway the outcome of the case. As the Marshal, Roberts was responsible for summoning potential jurors. Robert J. Brent, Maryland's Attorney General, who was part of the prosecution team, later claimed that "a large majority" of the potential jurors called by Marshal Roberts were "unfavorable to a conviction". On November 27, 1851, Roberts permitted a Thanksgiving meal to be prepared for all the prisoners, and even joined them in the prison for the meal. The incident caused the Maryland Attorney General to censure Roberts's lack of "impartiality" and "decorum".

=== Scott's testimony ===
Later in the trial, Roberts participated in another event that had a major role in determining the outcome of the case. A certain black named George Washington Scott was going to offer testimony to the fact that he was at the scene of the battle on September 11, that he saw the men who shot Gorsuch, and that the group was organized to "resist all slave holders". When called upon to testify in court, however, he changed his story and claimed that he was not present that day (an admission that came as quite a surprise to the prosecuting attorneys). It turned out that the night before, Roberts had allowed several black men into the prison to "converse" with Scott.

Maryland's Attorney General cried foul, and indirectly accused Marshal Roberts of witness tampering, citing the interesting fact that all of the black men in custody had a neat appearance except for Scott who was "ragged, dirty, and filthy". Despite protests from the prosecution, Scott maintained that he was not at the battle scene and that he had initially lied about being there because he was scared. In the end, Castner Hanway was acquitted. Since his was a test case, the prosecution decided not to prosecute the remaining cases.

== Late political career ==
Roberts ran as an Independent Whig in the 1845 United States House of Representatives election in Pennsylvania's 9th congressional district. Thaddeus Stevens put his support behind Roberts. The Whigs were appalled by Roberts's candidacy; an article in the Lancaster Examiner reflects this attitude:

Inconsistent in everything else, he is consistent only in his blind obedience to Thaddeus Stevens. If he is elected, we shall be represented by the shadow of Mr. Stevens without his brains.

Despite such resistance to Anthony Roberts, on October 13, 1854, Roberts defeated his rival and relative, Isaac Ellmaker Hiester, by a vote of 6,561 to 5,371 (with 4,266 votes going to the Democratic nominee). Thus Roberts won Pennsylvania's Ninth District seat in the Thirty-Fourth Congress.

That same year, the Republican Party was beginning to form around the central tenet of stopping the spread of slavery. In 1855 and 1856, Roberts was among the leaders who established the Party in Pennsylvania, and he strongly advocated its principles. When his first term in Congress ended, he sought re-election as a Republican, and won a second term. During his second term he served on the Public Buildings and Grounds Committee. Altogether, he served in Congress from March 4, 1855, to March 3, 1859, as the first Republican to represent Lancaster County in Congress.

He was not a candidate for re-nomination in 1858. Roberts continued in politics as an active organizer of the Republican Party in Pennsylvania. He ran for Mayor of Lancaster in 1867, but was defeated by the Democratic candidate in a city that had strong Democratic support. Roberts' obituary, published in the Clarion on January 24, 1885, states that his actions in Congress "were always true to his constituents".

== Other activities ==
Roberts active public life resulted in his appointment to many committees. In 1830 he was part of a committee to distribute remonstrances (protests) in Earl Township, in response to a proposal to form Conestoga County from parts of Lancaster, Chester, and Berks counties.

On April 5, 1841, Roberts was chosen as a secretary of a meeting in which citizens of Lancaster adopted resolutions to express their sorrow and grief over the unexpected death of President William Henry Harrison. On June 13, 1848, Roberts was appointed to a committee to solicit contributions to mitigate the losses suffered two weeks earlier in a devastating fire in Allentown. After the death of President James Buchanan in 1868, Roberts was appointed as one of the vice-presidents of a committee to arrange the president's funeral services. Roberts also served for a time as chairman of the visiting committee of the School Board in Lancaster.

Roberts owned a lot of real estate in and near New Holland in Lancaster County. He seems to have used his real estate holdings to promote education and the general public welfare. On October 22, 1845, he bought a plot of ground with a brick house on it known as the Methodist Meeting House. Six years later he sold it to the Earl School District.

In 1850, he completed construction on what was then the largest dwelling in eastern Lancaster County. The construction's purpose was mysterious until its completion, when Roberts announced that a select school would be opened in part of his home. He also assisted in freeing many pieces of property from rent structures that harmed the common people dwelling in New Holland. In 1860, in the City of Lancaster, he was one of the incorporators of an institution dedicated to providing homes for poor and uncared for children. One biographer notes that "[the common people of New Holland] looked upon him as their friend and champion of their rights". As a close friend of Thaddeus Stevens, Roberts was designated one of the executors of Stevens' will.

== Family and late life ==
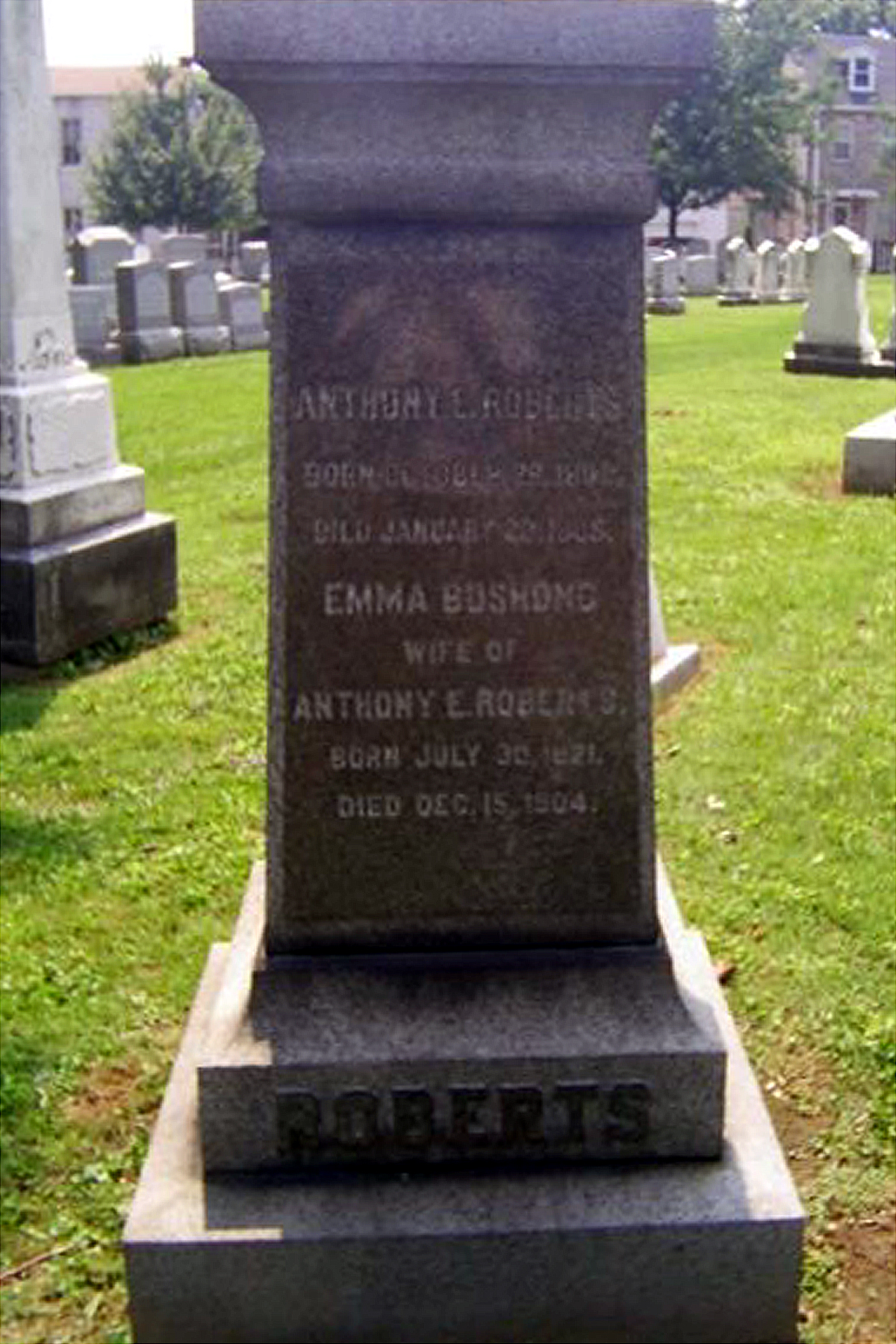
Anthony Ellmaker Roberts Memorial Stone

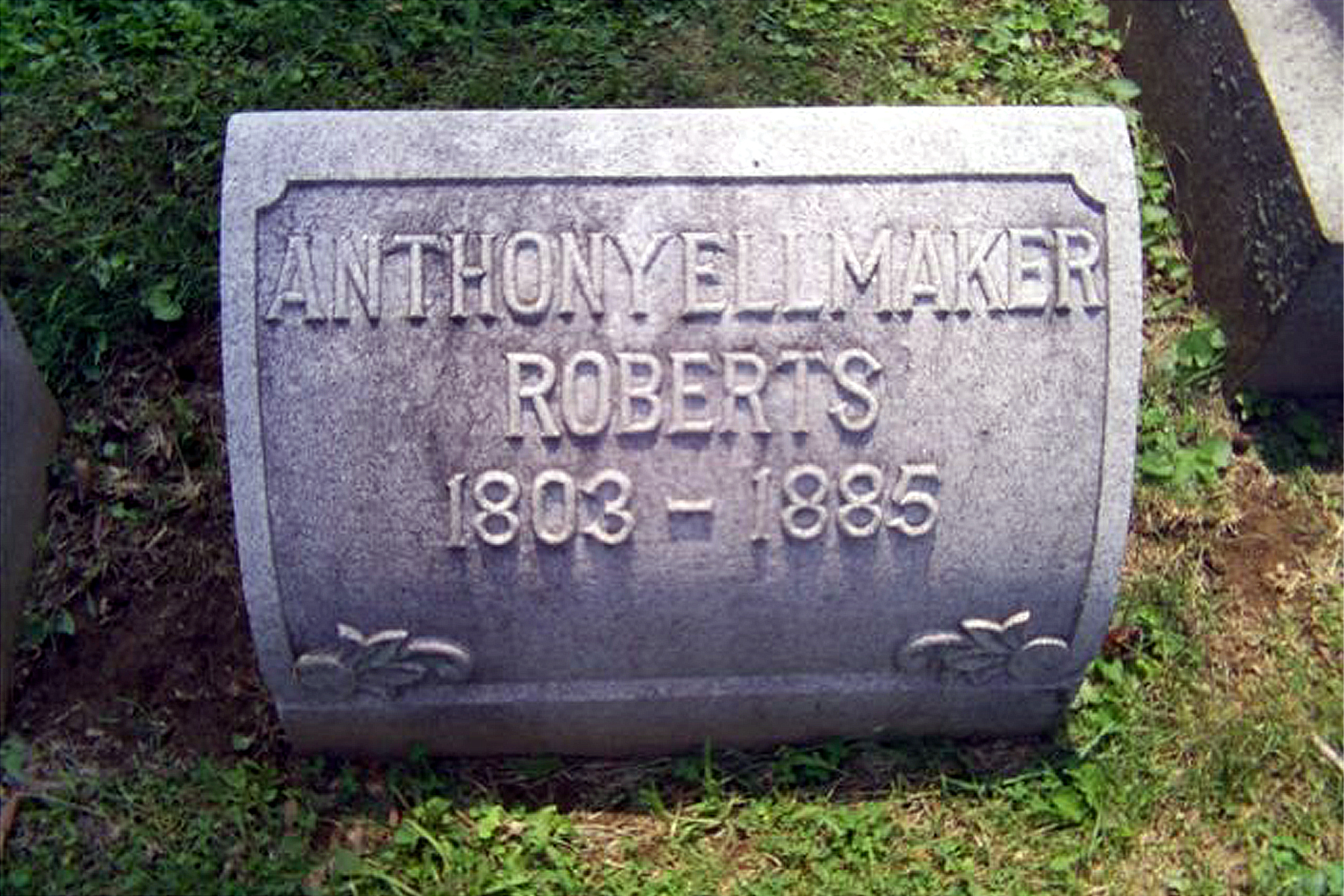
Anthony Ellmaker Roberts Headstone

In 1840, Anthony married Emma Bushong, who was about eighteen years his junior, and they had twelve children. Anthony died in Lancaster City on January 23, 1885, at the age of eighty-one. He was buried in Lancaster Cemetery. One biographer summarized his life as

characterized by firmly-established principles of justice and right to his fellowmen, independent thought and action, and a wellbalanced, reading, and reasoning mind. Throughout life he has sought to fulfill the full duties of the citizen, and both in public and private life enjoyed the confidence of those who knew him.

U.S. House of Representatives
Preceded by Isaac E. Hiester	Member of the U.S. House of Representatives from Pennsylvania's 9th congressional district 1855-1859	Succeeded by Thaddeus Stevens
