= William Muhlenberg Hiester =

American politician

William Muhlenberg Hiester (May 15, 1818 – August 16, 1878) was an American political and military leader from Pennsylvania who served as Democratic Speaker of the Pennsylvania State Senate for the 5th district from 1853 to 1857. He was a member of the Muhlenberg/Hiester Family political dynasty.

== Early life and education ==
Hiester was born in Reading, Pennsylvania to Dr. Isaac and Mrs. Hester Muhlenberg Hiester. He was the grandson of General Peter Muhlenberg and the great grandson of Henry Muhlenberg. He was the father of Isaac Hiester, uncle of Hiester Clymer, and nephew of John Hiester and Daniel Hiester.

He graduated from Bristol College in Pennsylvania, studied law at Harvard University and was admitted to the bar. He practiced law in Erie, Pennsylvania and later in Reading with his partner Henry A. Muhlenberg.

== Career ==
Hiester served in the Pennsylvania State Senate as a Democrat from 1853 to 1855 and was Speaker in 1855.

In January 1858, he was appointed Secretary of the Commonwealth by Governor William F. Packer.

During the American Civil War invasion of Pennsylvania by Robert E. Lee in the summer of 1863, Hiester was commissioned a Major in the Militia by Governor Andrew Curtin and raised 8,000 troops for the state's defense.

During the war, Hiester switched to the Republican Party and ran unsuccessfully for the United States House of Representatives in 1864.
