= John C. Kubacki =

American politician

Mayor of Reading, Pennsylvania
- In office 1960–1964
- Preceded by: Daniel F. McDevitt
- Succeeded by: Eugene Shirk

Member of the Pennsylvania House of Representatives for the First Berks County District
- In office 1951–1955
- Preceded by: Andrew Kondrath
- Succeeded by: Gus Yatron

Personal details
- Born: June 6, 1912 Reading, Pennsylvania, U.S.
- Died: November 23, 1988 (aged 76) Reading, Pennsylvania, U.S.
- Resting place: Gethsemane Cemetery; Laureldale, Pennsylvania
- Party: Democratic
- Spouse: Mary Stockler (m. 1939)
- Children: 2
- Education: Bucknell University
- Occupation: Teacher

John Chandler Kubacki (June 6, 1912 – November 23, 1988) was an American politician who was Mayor of Reading, Pennsylvania, from 1960 to 1964. He was convicted of extorting money from companies that sold parking meters to the city as well as madam from whom he obtained protection money.

== Early life ==
Kubacki was born in Reading, Pennsylvania, on June 6, 1912. His father, Bernard, was a foreman for the Reading Car Wheel Company. Kubacki graduated from Reading Senior High School in 1930 and Bucknell University in 1934. He was involved in athletics and was captain of the Bucknell boxing team his senior year. In 1935, he became athletic director, teacher, and basketball coach at Wyomissing Polytechnic Institute. He served in the United States Navy during World War II as a physical training officer. After the war, he worked in public relations for a distillery.

== Political career ==
In 1947, Kubacki helped organized and was elected chairman of the Veterans Political Advisory Board, which was created to recruit war veterans to run for political office and lobby for better housing, sports, and recreation facilities in Reading. He was an unsuccessful candidate for the Reading school board in 1947 and the Pennsylvania House of Representatives in 1948. In 1949, Mayor John F. Davis appointed Kubacki to the Mayor's committee on housing. Later that year, Kubacki was elected to the school board.

In 1950, Kubacki was elected as a Democrat to the Pennsylvania House of Representatives. He was an unsuccessful candidate for city comptroller in 1951, but was reelected to the House in 1952 and 1954. He was elected to the Reading city council in 1955 and resigned from the House on December 31 of that year. He also served as the city's director of public safety.

By 1958, Kubacki was at odds with members of his own party, including mayor Daniel F. McDevitt. In 1959, he upset McDevitt to win the Democratic nomination for mayor. In the general election, he defeated his former homeroom teacher, J. Edgar Hilgendorf, by 5,603 votes to become mayor of Reading.

During Kubacki's mayoralty, the city began a number of public improvement projects, including downtown commercial redevelopment, renovations to the Reading Regional Airport, and a $4.5 million sewage program, and completed two parking projects. Also under Kubacki, the Reading Police Department started its canine unit and expanded its juvenile department. Kubacki filled boards with loyalists and dismissed longtime Reading Airport Authority executive director Mel Nuss and the director of both the Reading House Authority and Reading Redevelopment Authority, Phil Schmehl.

In April 1963, Reading Police Chief Charles S. Wade was indicted on perjury charges. Kubacki chose not to discipline or suspend Wade. On May 21, 1963, Kubacki was upset in the Democratic mayoral primary by Harold L. Guldin.

== Criminal charges ==
In 1961, as part of United States Attorney General Robert F. Kennedy's war on organized crime, U.S. attorneys Thomas F. McBride and Henry S. Ruth Jr. were assigned to investigate racketeering in Reading and Berks County, Pennsylvania. On July 8, 1963, Kubacki was indicted by a federal grand jury for violations of the Hobbs Act and Travel Act. He was accused of extorting $10,500 from companies selling parking meters. On April 17, 1964, he and his co-defendant, rackets boss Abraham Minker, were convicted on all charges. Kubacki was sentenced to 30 days in prison and fined $5,000. In 1968, Judge Alfred Leopold Luongo dismissed the $4,250 unpaid portion of his fine due to financial hardship.

On September 9, 1964, Kubacki, Minker, and Benny Bonanno were charged with extortion and conspiracy to commit extortion for allegedly demanding payoffs from a brothel owner during Kubacki's tenure as mayor. The trio were found guilty on March 22, 1965, after a jury took just one hour to deliberate. They were sentenced to six months to a year in Berks County Prison. On November 16, 1966, the Superior Court of Pennsylvania voted 5 to 2 to grant all three defendants new trials after it found that the trial judge had erred by not allowing defense counsel to examine a tape recording of a statement made by prosecution witness Charles S. Wade and use portions of the statement in cross-examination. At the retrial, the alleged victim, Angeline Martin Wilkerson, refused to testify and the charges were dismissed against all three men.

On January 27, 1965, Kubacki was found not guilty of extorting $500 from a dealer who sold the city two police vans.

== Later life ==
In 1968, Kubacki returned to politics as a candidate for his old House seat, but lost in the Democratic primary. In 1977, he suffered a stroke. Kubacki died at his home on November 23, 1988, of natural causes. He was buried in Gethsemane Cemetery in Laureldale, Pennsylvania.

== Personal life ==
On June 25, 1939, Kubacki married Mary Stockler. They had two sons – Alan and Joseph. Alan Kubacki is a former teacher and administrator in the Reading School District and was a member of the Reading Housing Authority. Joseph Kubacki is an ophthalmologist who was an associate dean of the Temple University School of Medicine. In 2011, he was convicted of 150 counts of health care fraud, wire fraud and making false statements for billing for patient care that actually was handled by medical residents.
