= Riverside Elementary School =

Riverside Elementary School may refer to

- Riverside Elementary School (Reading, Pennsylvania)
- Riverside Elementary School (Wichita, Kansas)
