= Daniel McDevitt =

Daniel McDevitt may refer to:

- Corporal Punishment (wrestler) (born Daniel McDevitt, 1973), American professional wrestler
- Daniel F. McDevitt (1916–1965), American politician
- Danny McDevitt (1932–2010), American baseball player
