= Tossi Aaron =

American folk singer (died 2018)

Background information
- Died: March 20, 2018
- Genres: folk music
- Occupations: folk singer, educator, author, editor, folk dancer
- Label: Prestige International
- Spouse: Leon Aaron

Tossi Aaron (died 2018) was an American folk singer, folk dancer, author, educator, and folk historian. She is known for her early-1960s recordings of secular and Jewish folk music, with a repertoire including blues, early American songs, and British and Scottish ballads in addition to folk songs in Yiddish and Hebrew. Following her recording and performing career she became a prominent music and arts educator.

== Folk musician ==
In 1962 Prestige International released her 15-track album Tossi Aaron sings Jewish Folk Songs for the 2nd generation, composed of Yiddish and Hebrew folk songs, and her album of non-Jewish folk music, Tossi Sings Folk Songs and Ballads. The latter album included her best-known track, "I Know You Rider," the first recorded and released version of the 1920s folk-blues song that became a popular folk-music staple. The album also included "A Girl of Constant Sorrow," "Gypsy Davy," "House Carpenter," "House of the Rising Sun," "I Saw the Light," "Waly, Waly" and others.

Aaron helped establish the Philadelphia Folk Festival in 1962 and performed at its first iteration that year along with Pete Seeger, Reverend Gary Davis, The Greenbriar Boys, Obray Ramsey, and Jack Elliott. She was a founding member of the Philadelphia Folksong Society.

== Educator ==
Following her career as a folk musician and recording artist she went into education and became an influential figure in the American Orff-Schulwerk Association, an organization for professional music educators. A founding member of its Philadelphia chapter, she became editor of the organization's publication Orff Echo. She worked as an Orff specialist at the Philadelphia School, taught at Chestnut Hill College, and taught in the Orff-Schulwerk Teachers Certification Program at Abington Friends School.

In 1965 she released a children's record, A Child's Introduction to Going to School, which she narrated and sang.

== Author ==
Aaron authored and co-authored a number of books in the 1970s including Music for Children and Joy Play Sing Dance (American Play-Parties) (with Wautack Jos). She edited and adapted from the Danish Musicbook O: Pulse, Pitch, Rhythm, Form, Dynamics, a source book on music for preschool and primary grades, co-authored In Canon: Explorations of Familiar Canons for Voices, Recorders and Orff Instruments, and wrote Punchinella 47 : twenty traditional American play parties for singing, dancing, and playing Orff instruments.

== Personal life ==
She was married to Leon Aaron, and the couple had two children, Rachel Roca and Ellen Aaron.
