= Muhlenberg Brothers =

One of the dominant architecture/engineering firms in Reading, Pennsylvania

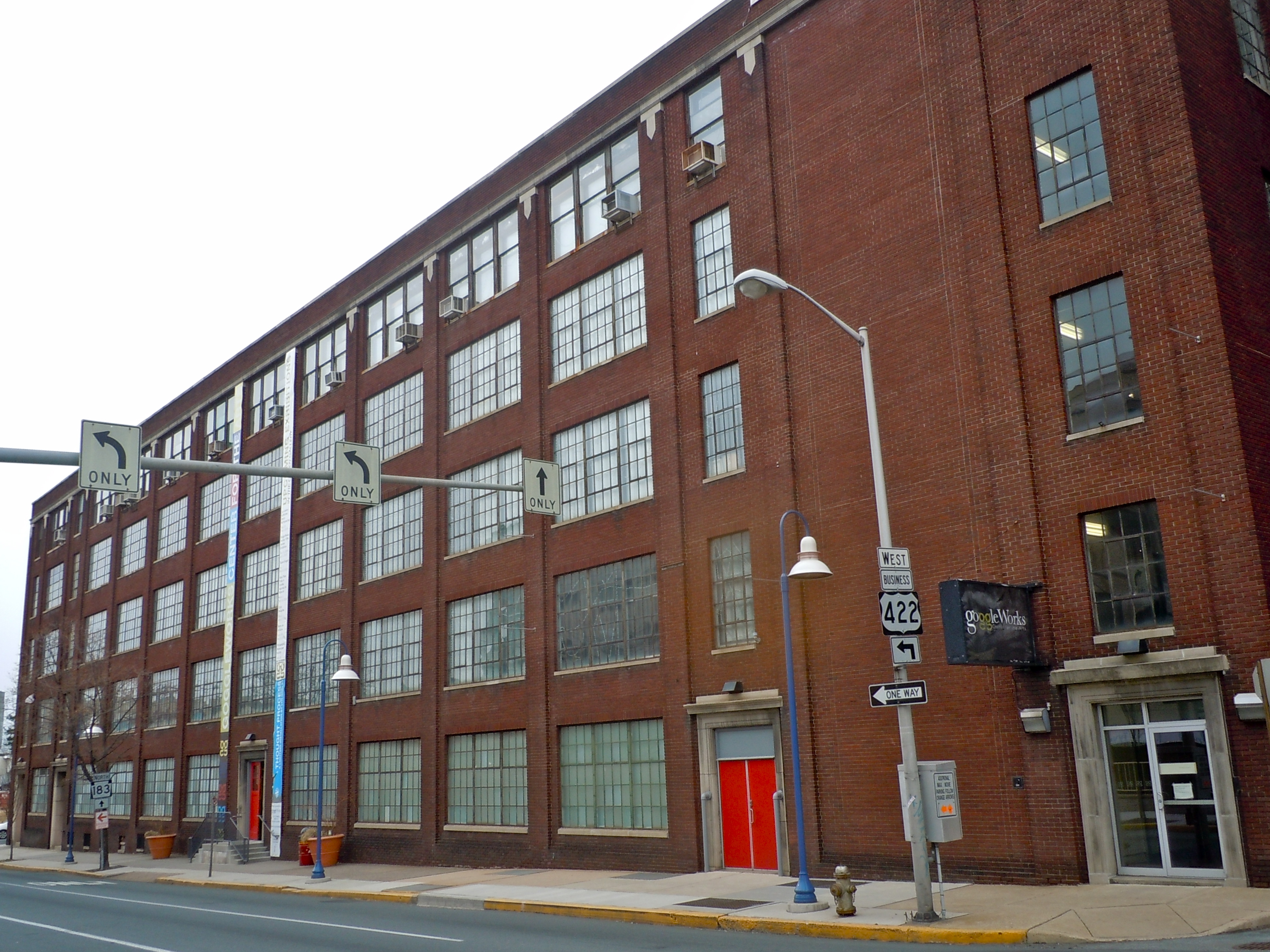
Thomas A. Willson & Company (1946), Reading, Pennsylvania. Now GoggleWorks Center for the Arts.

Muhlenberg Brothers was one of the dominant architecture/engineering firms in Reading, Pennsylvania during the first half of the 20th century, founded by a member of the Muhlenberg political dynasty.

== History ==
It was established in 1892 by Charles Henry Muhlenberg IV (1870–1960), who graduated from the Massachusetts Institute of Technology and apprenticed under the architect Frank Furness. His brother, Frederick Hunter Muhlenberg II (1865–1933), attended both Lafayette College and MIT. The founder's son, Charles Henry Muhlenberg V (1899–1985), who attended the University of Wisconsin and MIT (and played a role in the spread of the Monopoly board game), joined the firm in 1923. Frederick Hunter Muhlenberg II left the firm in the mid-1920s to go into partnership with his nephew, Frederick Augustus Muhlenberg II, operating as Muhlenberg & Muhlenberg.

Its main offices were located at 113-A South Fourth Street in Reading. It established a branch office in Pottsville, Pennsylvania, and one in St. Petersburg, Florida in the 1920s. By 1937, Frederick H. Muhlenberg II had died, Charles H. Muhlenberg IV was listed as a consultant, G. Russell Steininger was no longer part of the firm, and Charles H. Muhlenberg V and Frederick R. Shenk were the principals. The firm continued until about 1965, when Shenk formed Frederick R. Shenk & Lee V. Seibert.

== Work ==
Muhlenberg Brothers designed both residential and commercial works, and large projects such as office buildings, churches and factories. Among the commissions were a vaudeville theater, a number of public school buildings, and much of the campus of Albright College. G. Russell Steininger, landscape architect, was a principal in the firm by 1929. A number of the firm's works are listed on the U.S. National Register of Historic Places.

The Historical Society of Berks County owns two portfolios of photographs of Muhlenberg Brothers buildings, from 1929 and 1937, along with hundreds of blueprints from the firm.

== Selected works ==
=== Houses ===
- W. W. Kline House (1905–07), 200 Wilson Street, West Lawn, Pennsylvania. Featured in The Architectural Review, Volume 14 (1907), pp. 84–85.
- Frederick H. Muhlenberg II House (1907), 1020 Centre Avenue, Reading, Pennsylvania. The architect's own house.
- Alterations to Harbster House (c. 1910), 742 Centre Avenue, Reading, Pennsylvania. Frank Furness designed the house (c. 1886). Charles H. Muhlenberg IV may have worked on the original house while in Furness's office.
- Charles H. Muhlenberg IV House (1926), 1221 Garfield Avenue, Wyomissing, Pennsylvania. The architect's own house.
- John M. Frame House (1927), 901 N. Third Street, Reading, Pennsylvania. Designed by Frederick H. Muhlenberg II.

=== Churches ===
- Rectory (1893) and Parish Hall (), St. Paul's Roman Catholic Church, 151 N. Ninth Street, Reading, Pennsylvania.
- Holy Spirit Lutheran Church (1922), Fourth & Windsor Streets, Reading, Pennsylvania.
- First Church of Christ Scientist (1925), Centre Avenue & Greenwich Street, Reading, Pennsylvania.
- First Presbyterian Church (), 200 North Ninth Street, Ashland, Pennsylvania. Now First United Methodist Presbyterian Church.
- Immanuel United Church of Christ (1955–59), 99 S. Waverly Street, Shillington, Pennsylvania.

=== Schools and cultural institutions ===
- Young Women's Christian Association (1921–22, demolished), 215 North Sixth Street, Reading, Pennsylvania.
- McAdoo High School (1927–28, demolished), Sherman Street, McAdoo, Pennsylvania.
- Tyson-Schoener Elementary School (1928), 315 S. Fifth Street, Reading, Pennsylvania. Charles H. Muhlenberg V designed the building. His sister, Virginia Muhlenberg Steininger, created the decorative tiles.
- Historical Society of Berks County (1928–29), 940 Centre Avenue, Reading, Pennsylvania.
- 13th & Union Elementary School (1929), 13th & Union Streets, Reading, Pennsylvania. In 1936, Muhlenberg Brothers added the north wing and gymnasium.
- Cressona High School (1929), 45 Wilder Street, Cressona, Pennsylvania. Now Blue Mountain Elementary School Cressona.
- Wyomissing Public Library (1930–31), 9 Reading Boulevard, Wyomissing, Pennsylvania.
- William Jeanes Memorial Library (1935), Butler Pike, Plymouth Meeting, Pennsylvania. Built on the grounds of the Plymouth Friends Meetinghouse. A new Jeanes Library was built in Whitemarsh Township, Pennsylvania in 1971.
- St. Clair High School (1937–38), South Mill & Nichols Streets, St. Clair, Pennsylvania. Now St. Clair Area Elementary School.
- Wyomissing High School (1937–40), 630 Evans Avenue, Wyomissing, Pennsylvania.
- Visitor center and library (1940–41), Landis Valley Museum, 2451 Kissel Hill Road, Lancaster, Pennsylvania.
- Expansion of Muhlenberg High School (1949–51), 400 Sharp Avenue, Laureldale, Pennsylvania.
- Albright College, Reading, Pennsylvania:
  - Breyfogel Theological Building (1928–29). Now Teel Hall.
  - Women's dormitory.
  - Merner-Pfeiffer Hall of Science (1929–30).
  - Library.
  - Merner-Pfeiffer-Klein Memorial Chapel (1958–60).

=== Other buildings ===
- Daniel F. Ancona Building (c. 1899), 604 North Fifth Street, Reading, Pennsylvania.
- Red Men Hall (1900), 831-33 Walnut Street, Reading, Pennsylvania. NRHP-listed.
- Farmers National Bank (1909), Penn Street, Reading, Pennsylvania.
- Hippodrome Theatre (1910, demolished 1970s), 751-57 Penn Street, Reading, Pennsylvania. Built as a vaudeville house, it was later expanded into a 1,228-seat movie theater.
- Reading Armory Drill Hall (1910–11), Rose & Walnut Streets, Reading, Pennsylvania.
- Alterations to Reading Hospital (1910–13), Front & Spring Streets, Reading, Pennsylvania.
- C. K. Whitner Department Store (1911), 438-44 Penn Street, Reading, Pennsylvania.
- Carpenter Steel Company, Annealing Building (1915), River Road & Exeter Street, Reading, Pennsylvania.
- Bank of Hamburg Savings & Trust Co. (1923), 52-54 South Fourth Street, Hamburg, Pennsylvania. Part of Hamburg Historic District.
- Masonic Building (1925), 4 South Second Street, Pottsville, Pennsylvania.
- City Bank and Trust Company (1937–40, demolished), 538 Penn Street, Reading, Pennsylvania.
- Thomas A. Willson & Company, Building 2 (1946), 201 Washington Street, Reading, Pennsylvania. NRHP-listed. Now GoggleWorks Center for the Arts.
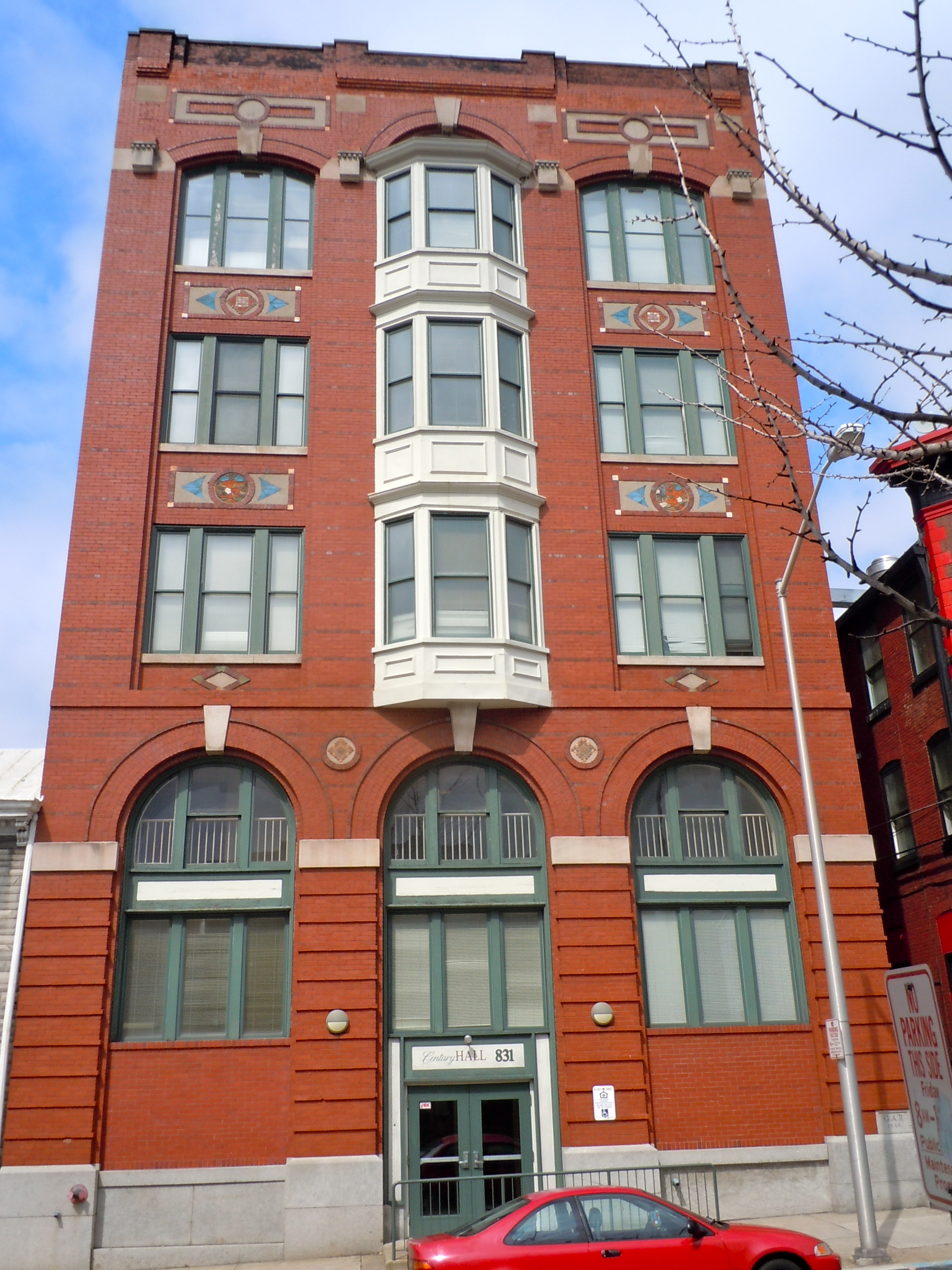
Red Men Hall (1900), Reading, Pennsylvania.

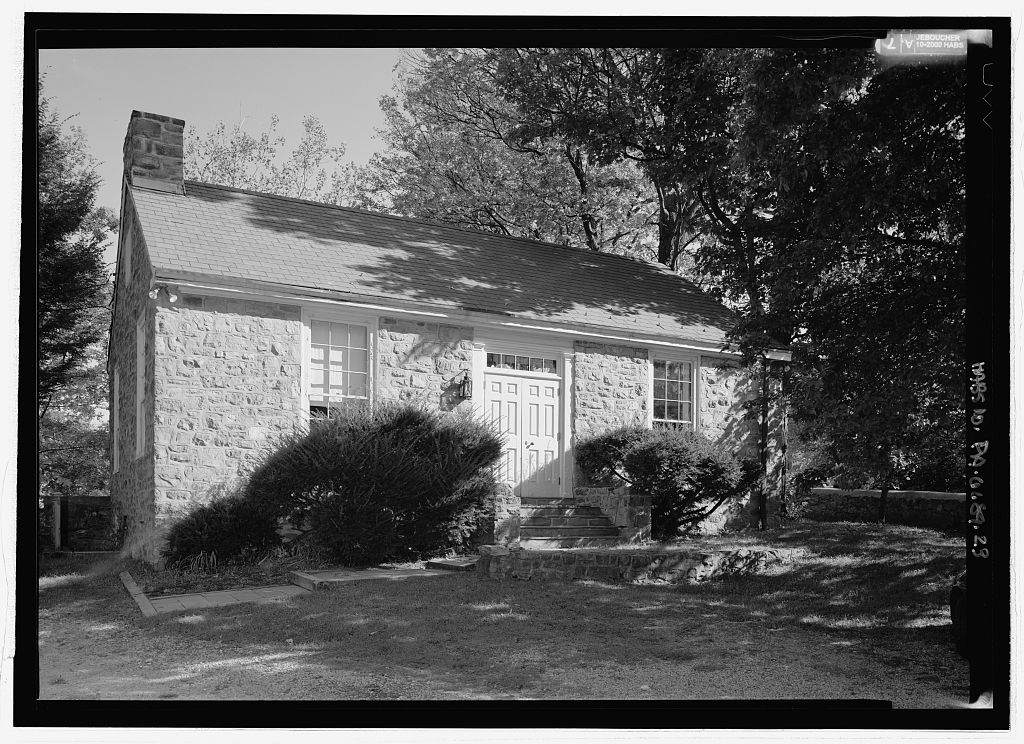
William Jeanes Memorial Library (1935), Plymouth Meeting, Pennsylvania.
