= George Britton (musician) =

American singer, actor and guitarist

- Born: October 19, 1910; Reading, Pennsylvania
- Died: February 12, 2010 (aged 99)

George Britton (19 October 1910 - 12 February 2010) was an American singer, actor, and guitarist. A classical bass-baritone, he had an active performing career in operas, concerts, and musicals during the 1930s through the 1960s. As a stage performer he is best known for succeeding Roger Rico in the role of Emile de Becque (originally played by Ezio Pinza) in the original Broadway production of Rodgers and Hammerstein's South Pacific. He portrayed the role for two years opposite Martha Wright as Nellie Forbush, and for a few weeks opposite Cloris Leachman.

Britton began performing concerts of folk music in the 1950s, accompanying himself on the guitar. In 1957 he cofounded the Philadelphia Folksong Society and the Philadelphia Folk Festival in 1962. In the 1960s his career moved primarily into performing folk music. He also taught guitar and voice at his studio, the George Britton Folk Studio.

== Early life and education ==
Britton was born in Reading, Pennsylvania, to parents of Irish and Pennsylvania Dutch descent. He studied at Columbia University where he graduated with a music degree in 1932. He notably was awarded the Gold King's Crowns Award by the university his senior year. He pursued graduate studies in voice at the Juilliard School, studying voice with Anna E. Schoen-René, a student of Pauline Viardot-García and Manuel García, earning a master's degree in 1936. While at Juilliard he notably appeared in the New York premiere of Richard Strauss's Ariadne auf Naxos and portrayed Etienne in the world premiere of Robert Russell Bennett's Maria Malibran opposite Helen Marshall in the title role and Risë Stevens as Cornelia.

== Career ==
Britton made his professional opera debut at the Chautauqua Opera in the summer of 1934. He was a regular performer with that company for over the next decade. In 1936 he married Patricia Norton at Chautauqua; they were divorced by 1946. Also in 1936 he made his first appearance at the Worcester Festival in a concert of opera arias with soprano Helen Jepson and conductor Albert Stoessel. He returned to that festival several times during the late 1930s and 1940s. In 1938, Britton sang Silvio in PAGLIACCI in Prague with Richard Tauber as Canio.

In 1941 Britton made his Carnegie Hall debut portraying the title role in Giacomo Puccini's Gianni Schicchi with the National Orchestral Association under the baton of Léon Barzin. He sang several roles with the short-lived New Opera Company (NOC) in Manhattan in the early 1940s, notably portraying Prince Tomsky opposite Martha Lipton in her professional opera debut as Pauline in Tchaikovsky's The Queen of Spades in October 1941. He also starred in the world premiere of Walter Damrosch's The Opera Cloak with the NOC in November 1942. In the summer of 1942 he made his first appearance at the Paper Mill Playhouse in Franz Schubert's Blossom Time. In 1945 he presented the world premiere of Miriam Gideon's art song "The Hound of Heaven" at the International Society for Contemporary Music convention.

Britton made one of his earliest forays into musical theatre in 1943, appearing in the Blackfriars Repertory Theatre's original musical, Moment Musical. The following year he returned to the Paper Mill Playhouse (PMP) to star in a production of Sigmund Romberg's The Student Prince. He was a regular performer at the PMP up through 1950. In 1946 he portrayed Huckleberry Haines in Jerome Kern's Roberta at the Los Angeles Civic Light Opera and starred in Victor Herbert's The Fortune Teller at the Curran Theatre in San Francisco. He made his Broadway debut at the New Century Theatre in September 1946 as Sandor in Robert Wright and George Forrest's Gypsy Lady. In 1948 he performed on the cast recording of Arthur Schwartz and Howard Dietz's musical review Inside U.S.A.. The recording was made before the show premiered on Broadway, and Britton did not actually appear in the stage production.

Britton continued to perform in operas, musicals, and concerts throughout the United States during the late 1940s through the early 1960s. In 1950 he portrayed Don Andrès de Ribeira in Jacques Offenbach's La Périchole at New York's Town Hall under the direction of Maggie Teyte. That same year he portrayed the four villains in Offenbach's The Tales of Hoffmann for NBC Opera Theatre and the role of Massakroff in Oscar Straus's The Chocolate Soldier on NBC's Musical Comedy Time. He made several appearances with Philadelphia's Co-Opera Company in the early 1950s, including Mr Gobineau in Gian Carlo Menotti's The Medium. In January 1952 he took over the role of Emile de Becque in the original Broadway production of Rodgers and Hammerstein's South Pacific, staying with the production until it closed on Jan 16, 1954. In 1953 he recorded selections from Anything Goes and Kiss Me Kate with Lisa Kirk and Helena Bliss for RCA Records. In 1961 he appeared in the United States premiere of Roland Fiore's Linda at the Philadelphia Lyric Opera Company.

Although initially a singer by profession, Britton was also a talented guitarist. In the early 1950s he became seriously interested in the music of his mother's Pennsylvania Dutch heritage. He began performing concerts of these folk pieces with just his voice and a guitar. In 1955 he recorded his only solo album, "Pennsylvania Dutch Folk Songs", with Folkways Records. The recording is now a part of the collection at the Smithsonian Center for Folklife and Cultural Heritage. After leaving South Pacific in 1954 his performance career became increasingly more involved with performing folk music and by the mid-1960s he had left classical music entirely. For many years he was heavily involved with the Philadelphia Folk Festival, which he helped establish in 1962.
