= Century Hall =

Century Hall may refer to:

- Centennial Hall in Wrocław, Poland; alternate translation of name into English
- Red Men Hall (Reading, Pennsylvania), NRHP Listed building, completed in 1900
- Century Hall (Nagoya), part of the Nagoya Congress Center
