= William Wiswesser =

American chemist (1914–1989)

William J. Wiswesser
- Born: December 3, 1914; Reading, Pennsylvania, U.S.
- Died: December 17, 1989 (age 75); Reading, Pennsylvania, U.S.
- Education: Lehigh University (BS)
- Known for: Wiswesser line notation Wiswesser rule
- Awards: Department of the Army Decoration for Exceptional Civilian Service
- Scientific career
- Fields: computational chemistry chemical information
- Workplaces: Cooper Union; United States Army; USDA

William Joseph Wiswesser (December 3, 1914 – December 17, 1989) was an American chemist best known as the creator of the Wiswesser line notation (WLN), which was an innovative way to represent chemical structures in a linear string of characters suitable for computer manipulation. He is also known for the Wiswesser rule, a mathematical formula that predicts the order of atomic orbitals in many-electron atoms.

== Early life and education ==
Wiswesser was born in Reading, Pennsylvania, to Louis and Hattie (Flatt) Wiswesser in 1914. He attended Reading High School in Reading, and graduated from Lehigh University in Bethlehem, Pennsylvania, with a B.S. degree in chemistry in 1936.

== Career ==
Following graduation, he worked at Hercules, the Trojan Powder Company, and the Picatinny Arsenal. Wiswesser then was an instructor of chemistry in the Cooper Union's School of Engineering during the 1940s. In 1945, he published his paper describing a formula that correctly orders the subshells of atomic orbitals in the manner of the Aufbau principle, known as the Wiswesser rule. Following his time at Cooper Union, Wiswesser worked for Willson Products, where he was Director of Industrial Hygiene, followed by civilian employment by the U.S. Army at Fort Detrick and finally at the Agricultural Research Service of the USDA.

In 1949, Wiswesser first presented what is now known as the Wiswesser line notation, which was particularly well suited to molecular structure representation within the computing platforms and modalities available. This work, which was further developed and expanded on by him for many years, had a lasting impact on the field of chemical informatics.

Wiswesser was also interested in the history of chemistry and near the end of his life he made a special study of Josef Loschmidt's work, alone at first and then together with preeminent chemist Alfred Bader.

== Honors and awards ==
In 1970 he was awarded the Department of the Army Decoration for Exceptional Civilian Service, the highest honour which can be given by the United States Army to a civilian, in recognition of his "Chemical Line-Formula Notation", the WLN. That same year, he was awarded an honorary doctorate at Lehigh University.

In 1975 he was awarded the Austin M. Patterson Award for chemical information science.

Wiswesser received the American Chemical Society Division of Chemical Information's Herman Skolnik Award in 1980, with a citation "For pioneering mathematical, physical, and chemical methods of punched-card and computer-stored representation of molecular structures, leading to the creation of the Wiswesser Line Notation (WLN) for concise storage and retrieval of chemical structures ...".

== Death ==
At the end of his life he was working for the United States Department of Agriculture on weed science until his final illness, and he died on 17 December 1989, aged 75, in Wyomissing, Pennsylvania, leaving a widow, Katherine, and a son, daughter and four grandchildren. His scientific papers were deposited at Lehigh University after his death.
