= Levi Landis =

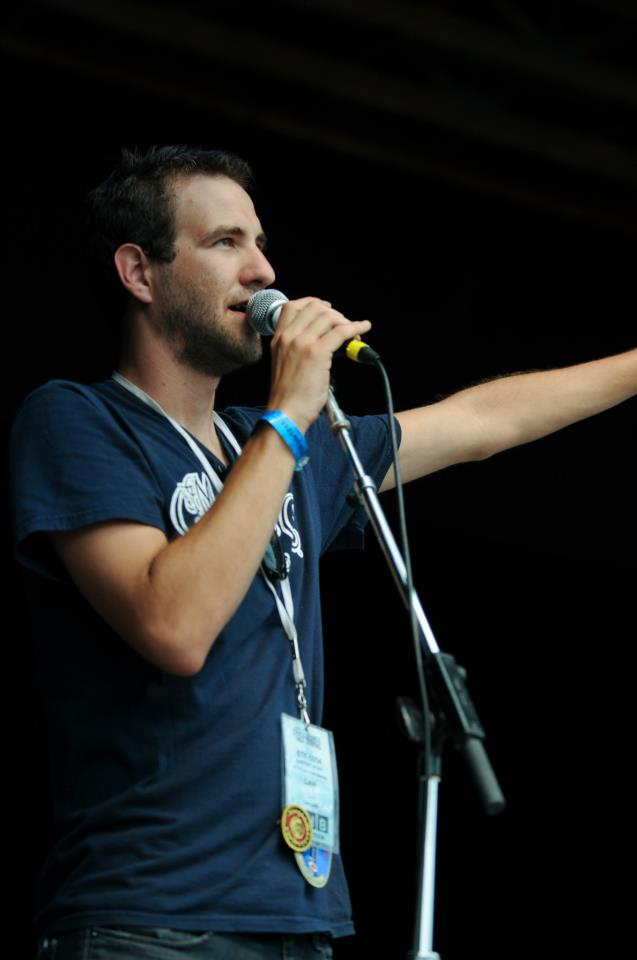
- Levi Landis at the 2011 Philadelphia Folk Festival
- Born: Levi Preston Landis; July 8, 1982 (age 43)
- Education: Villanova University
- Occupation: Executive Director
- Employer: GoggleWorks Center for the Arts
- Known for: Philadelphia Folk Festival, The Center for Art in Wood
- Spouse: Hannah Kern
- Children: 1

Levi Preston Landis (born July 8, 1982) is an arts administrator, musician, manager and festival producer. Since 2016, he has been the executive director of GoggleWorks Center for the Arts, the largest visual art center in the country.

== Biography ==
After working as a touring musician, Landis graduated from Villanova University's MPA program. Early in his career, he founded the community art center Emmaus, Inc, which renovated a large former Elks Lodge into a concert hall, thrift store, music school and bowling alley.

From 2008 to 2014, he served as the executive director of the Philadelphia Folksong Society, nonprofit parent of the Philadelphia Folk Festival.

From 2014 to 2016, a grant from the William Penn Foundation, funded his position as the first Director of Operations for The Center for Art in Wood in Philadelphia.

Landis moved to Reading, Pennsylvania in 2016 and became the Executive Director GoggleWorks Center for the Arts during its 10th anniversary year.

=== Music ===
While his career has focused largely on arts leadership, Levi Landis was also a professional recording artist with the rock band Complete Circle (1994-2004) and a solo artist billed as Levi Landis and The Nobodys (2004-2008), releasing his most recent LP Something About Repairs in 2006. In 2008 he moved to Philadelphia and began directing the Philadelphia Folksong Society (PFS). During his tenure, the Philadelphia Folk Festival celebrated its 50th anniversary, adding more contemporary acts, and growing attendance to roughly 14,000 visitors per day. Landis added a beer garden with Yards Brewing Company and two additional stages to the program. In 2012, the Philadelphia Folk Festival was named one of Rolling Stone Magazine top 19 summer festivals. At the PFS, Landis also launched the Philadelphia Music Co-op, programmed the annual 2nd Street Festival, educational programs, and fundraisers, including Doc Watson's final Philadelphia area performance.

After moving to Reading in 2016, Landis continued to produce events, including concerts in association with Reading Blues Festival, Boscov's Berks Jazz Fest, and Berks Country Festival

Landis also continues to record and perform with musical acts.

=== Visual art ===
Landis first became involved in visual arts at The Center for Art in Wood in 2014, where he superintended the staff, oversaw operations, and developed new funds, including a large grant from the Windgate Foundation. Landis oversees visual art programs at GoggleWorks Center for the Arts, including seven large teaching studios in ceramic, hot and warm glass, jewelry, photography, printmaking, and wood; 35 juried artists’ studios, exhibition galleries, and an independent film theatre. During his leadership, GoggleWorks was featured on national TV programs, Huffington Post named the art center one of the top 18 reasons to visit Berks County. He has focused on fundraising to drive new programs at GoggleWorks, which include the A.R.T. program for disabled artists and a new restaurant. Landis has produced or curated over 25 exhibitions in various mediums.

=== Associated Projects ===
- 2nd Street Festival, Philadelphia
- Arts Festival Reading
- Craft Now Philadelphia
- Emmaus, Inc.
- Floating Festivals
- Furniture Society Conference Craft/Facturing
- Old City Festival
- Philadelphia Folk Festival
- Philadelphia Music Co-op
- We Need to Talk podcast
