= Anna Eugénie Schoen-René =

German-American singer and teacher (1864–1942)

- Born: Anna Eugénie Schoen; 1864; Koblenz, Germany
- Died: 1942 (aged 77–78); New York, New York
- Burial place: Ferncliff Cemetery and Mausoleum
- Education: Royal Academy of Music, Berlin
- Occupations: Soprano, teacher

Anna Eugénie Schoen-René (1864, Koblenz – 1942, New York) was a German-American soprano and teacher. She was the first German woman to be elected to the French International Union of Arts and Sciences.

== Biography ==
Anna Eugénie Schoen was born in Koblenz, Germany, in 1864. Her father was Baron von Schoen, a Court Councilor to the Emperor and Royal Master of Forestry and Agriculture in the Rhineland. Later she added the last part of her name, René, to acknowledge the French influence of her mother.

=== Soprano ===
Schoen-René studied at the Royal Academy of Music in Berlin, Germany and, on the recommendation of her teacher there she became a voice student of the famed Pauline Viardot-García, herself a piano student of Franz Liszt. On her acceptance as a student, Schoen-René later said, "My real life as a musician and singer began only after I started my studies with her."

Schoen-René made her debut as Cherubino in The Marriage of Figaro, Zerlina in Don Giovanni and Marcelline in Fidelio at the Princely Opera of Saxony-Altenburg. In Paris, she appeared in concerts conducted by Charles Gounod. In 1891, Schoen-Rene became the "first German woman to be elected to the Union Internationale des Sciences et des Arts in Paris." In 1892 she received an offer of engagement from New York's Metropolitan Opera.

=== Teacher ===
A severe tuberculosis infection permanently ended Schoen-René's singing career. She spent three years with her sister in Minneapolis, where she founded two glee clubs at the University of Minnesota. Later, she expanded the clubs into an organized university Choral Union that took part in opera and oratorio performances. She lectured in the history of music at the university and was involved in founding the Faculty of Music. Encouraged by composer Walter Damrosch, she was instrumental in the formation of a small orchestra that later became the Minnesota Orchestra. She may have been the first woman to conduct an orchestra in the United States.

In 1941, she published her memoirs under the title America's Musical Inheritance: Memories and Reminiscences, where she mentioned her goals in Minnesota.

... as my health improved, I made more ambitious plans for the advancement of music not only in the university but in the entire Middle West, I felt that the only way in which the young student could learn to discriminate between good and bad music was for him to hear the best, and the only sure way of making him love it for life was to let him take part in its production. So I began to make arrangements to bring the best living artists to Minneapolis to give concerts, oratorios, and operas, which would be augmented musically by our Choral Union.

During the summers, Schoen-René would return to Paris to re-focus her own education with Pauline Viardot-Garcia. After training as a singing teacher with her brother Manuel García, she went to Berlin in 1909 as a singing teacher. After the start of the First World War, she returned to the United States, where she had been a citizen since 1906. From 1925 on, she taught at the Juilliard School of Music in New York City.

=== Notable students ===
Schoen-René was considered one of the most important singing teachers in the Western world in the 1920s and 1930s. Her strict insistence on discipline earned her the nickname "the Prussian General" among her students. These included many notable vocalists: Lucie Manén, Florencio Constantino, Risë Stevens, Mack Harrell, Judith Doniger, Lanny Ross, Marshall Bartholomew, George Meader, Sonia Essin, Paul Robeson, Thelma Votipka, Lillian Blauvelt, Florence Easton, Karin Branzell, Florence Austral, Charles Kullman, Marie Tiffany, Maria von Maximovitch, Julius Huehn, Eva Gauthier, George Britton, Ramona Rockway, Kitty Carlisle, and Margaret Harshaw.

She died in 1942 in New York City at 78 years of age.

In her will, she created the Anna E. Schoen-René Fund, to be administered by The New York Community Trust, stipulating that the fund's income would be used to help young Americans advance their studies in one of two very different fields, in forestry or in the vocal arts.
