= Sonia Essin =

Jewish-American contralto and educator

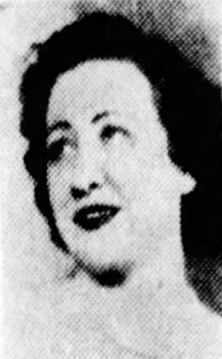
- Born: September 24, 1901; Chernihiv, Russian Empire
- Died: August 7, 1981 (aged 79); Los Angeles, California, U.S.
- Citizenship: American
- Education: Mannes School of Music; Juilliard School
- Occupations: Singer, educator
- Spouse: David Simmonds

Sonia Essin (born September 24, 1901, in Chernihiv; died August 7, 1981, in Los Angeles) was a Jewish-American contralto and educator who had an international career in operatic and classical music. She began her career in Europe before beginning a career in the United States on radio in the 1930s. Later in life, she focused on vocal teaching.

== Biography ==
Essin was born in Chernihiv on September 24, 1901. Her family arrived in New York on December 20, 1903. She grew up in the Cleveland area.

Essin was a member of the choir at both B'nai Jeshurun and the Free Synagogue in Manhattan. She graduated from both the Mannes School of Music and Juilliard where she studied with Anna Eugénie Schoen-René. She went to Europe, and gave her debut as a soloist in the Netherlands. She spent some years there and in Germany performing in opera productions at Deutsche Oper am Rhein and Hessisches Staatstheater Wiesbaden and in solo concerts, but was back in the United States by 1932. Essin was a soloist in the early 1930s with "The Walter Damrosch Symphony Hour" program on NBC Radio. Her solo performance debut in New York took place November 8, 1933, at the Town Hall. She was on the staff at NBC as a soloist and had her own weekly radio series that ended in 1936. She subsequently continued her broadcasting career on other stations such as WQXR

In 1943 she was engaged by the Handel and Haydn Society to solo in that year's presentation of Messiah. She was heard singing Wagnerian material by Arturo Toscannini, and at his invitation Essin made her debut at La Scala in 1948, performing the role of Brangäne in Tristan und Isolde. At the time she considered it the highlight of her career.

She joined the University of Cincinnati – College-Conservatory of Music faculty in September 1953, where in addition to her vocal coaching she continued to give recitals. She remained on the faculty for six years. Later in life she moved to Los Angeles.

== Reviews ==
Essin was declared by the Hartford Courant to have a "true" contralto voice, with a "rich and warm texture". In a similar vein, Arthur Darak of the Cincinnati Enquirer called her a "bona-fide" contralto, espousing her the expression, intelligence, and warmth of her voice which he stated overcame the limited variety in her repertoire.

== Personal life ==
Essin was married to David Simmonds, and spoke Yiddish fluently.

== Discography ==
- The Art of Sonia Essin - Orion Master Recordings ORS 77271
- Felix Mendelssohn - His Story And His Music - Vox MM 3530
- Franz Schubert: His Story And His Music - Vox MM 3540
- Johannes Brahms: His Story And His Music - Vox MM 3580
