= Gus Yatron =

American politician (1927–2003)

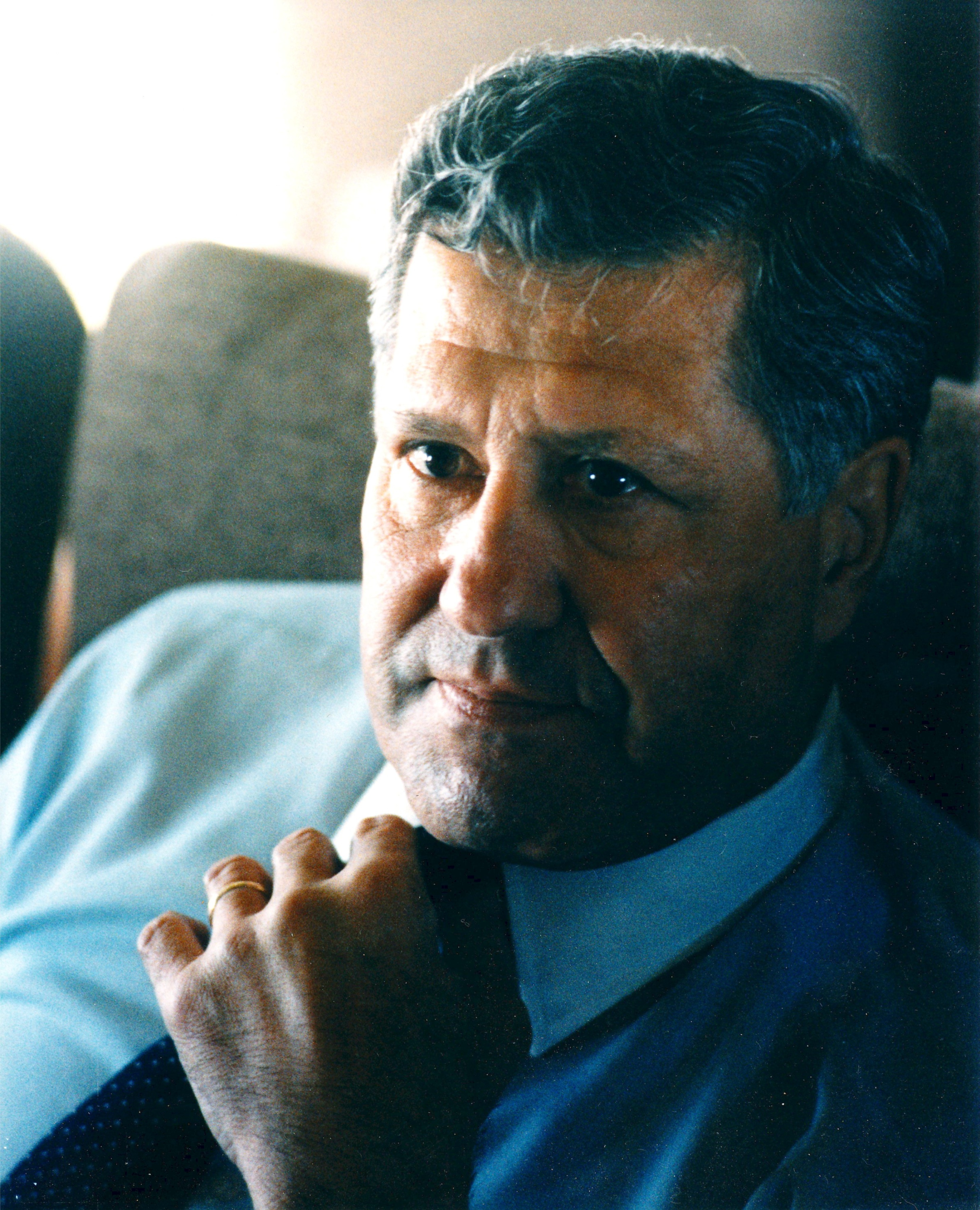

Member of the U.S. House of Representatives from Pennsylvania's 6th district
- In office January 3, 1969 – January 3, 1993
- Preceded by: George Rhodes
- Succeeded by: Tim Holden

Member of the Pennsylvania Senate from the 11th district
- In office January 3, 1961 – November 30, 1968
- Preceded by: Frank Ruth
- Succeeded by: Robert Gerhart

Member of the Pennsylvania House of Representatives from the 1st Berks County district
- In office January 1, 1957 – November 30, 1959
- Preceded by: John C. Kubacki
- Succeeded by: Daniel F. McDevitt

Personal details
- Born: October 16, 1927 Reading, Pennsylvania, U.S.
- Died: March 13, 2003 (aged 75) Fairfax Station, Virginia, U.S.
- Resting place: Charles Evans Cemetery; Reading, Pennsylvania, U.S.
- Party: Democratic
- Spouse: Mildred L. Yatron
- Children: George C. Yatron; Theana Yatron Kastens
- Education: Kutztown University of Pennsylvania
- Profession: Legislator, Businessman, Boxer

Constantine George "Gus" Yatron (October 16, 1927 – March 13, 2003) was an American businessman, boxer, and politician who served twelve consecutive terms as a Democratic member of the United States House of Representatives for Pennsylvania's 6th congressional district from 1969 to 1993.

== Early life and education ==
Gus Yatron was born in Reading, Pennsylvania, to George H. and Theano Lazo Yatron, working-class Greek immigrants from the Greek city of Mytilene, of the island Lesbos. His father, George, was a carpenter and his mother, Theano, worked as a maid. Yatron graduated from Reading High School, serving as class president during his senior year.

Following high school, Yatron received his bachelor's degree at Kutztown University of Pennsylvania in 1950, where he also met his wife to be, Mildred L. Yatron. While attending Kutztown University, Yatron played college football for the Golden Bears, and was later inducted into the Kutztown University Athletic Hall of Fame. During his college years, he also took up boxing, becoming a heavyweight division professional boxer in 1947, with a professional career record of 13-2-1, nine of which were TKO.

== Career ==
After graduating from college, Yatron ran 'Yatron Ice Cream,' the business he founded with his father and built it into a local success in his home town, eventually expanding the business with an additional hardware store. In 1968, he sold 'Yatron Ice Cream' to a local competitor and began to focus on his career in political public service.

=== Political career ===
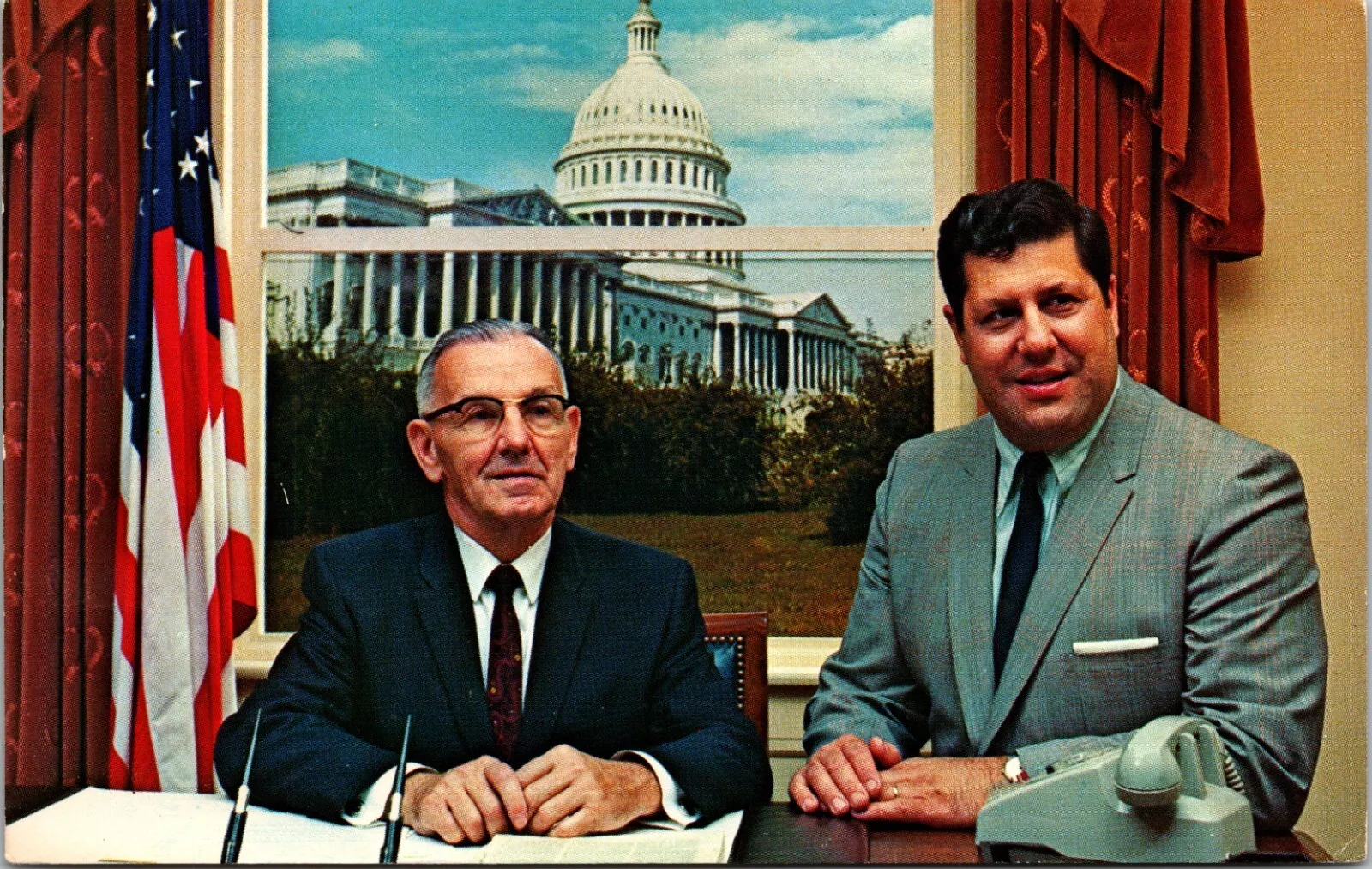
Yatron with George M. Rhodes in 1968

Yatron started his career in public service on the Reading School Board from 1955 to 1961. He served in the Pennsylvania House of Representatives for Berks County from 1956 until 1960. He served as a member of the Pennsylvania State Senate for the 11th district from 1961 to 1968. In 1968, campaigning as a moderate in support of fiscal responsibility and opposition to further military involvement in the Vietnam War, Yatron was elected to the 91st United States Congress, representing the 6th congressional district of Pennsylvania. Upon entering office, Yatron quick made a name for himself as a workhorse for his constituency.

His first major legislation, in 1971, expanded black lung benefits and extended eligibility requirements for afflicted miners, their widows and children. Yatron sponsored legislation, signed into law in 1975, which set up a committee to review the volume of paper wasted in U.S. federal government and offer recommendations to reduce that waste. After its investigation, the Paperwork Commission made recommendations that resulted in savings of $3.5 billion. As a Greek-American, Yatron found personal hardship during the 1974 Turkish invasion of Cyprus. As one in a few Greek-Americans in the U.S. Congress, he took leadership in implementing U.S. assistance that ultimately led to a cease-fire in the region. In 1973, Yatron traveled to Europe delivering a speech to the European Parliament in France, urging NATO countries to take more initiative in absorbing the costs of defending Europe.

As a member of the House Foreign Affairs Committee, Yatron became a passionate advocate for centering human rights as the cornerstone of U.S. foreign policy. He took the chairmanship of the House Foreign Affairs Subcommittee on Inter-American Affairs in 1979 and began investigations into the Iran–Contra affair. In 1983, Yatron become the chairman of the House Foreign Affairs Subcommittee on International Organizations, Human Rights and Oversight.

== Retirement and death ==
After serving 24 years in the U.S. House of Representatives, Yatron retired in 1992.

He died in Fairfax Station, Virginia in 2003. He was buried in Charles Evans Cemetery, Reading, Pennsylvania.

== See also ==
- Black Lung Benefits Act of 1972

== Sources ==
- United States Congress. "Gus Yatron (id: Y000014)". Biographical Directory of the United States Congress.
- Appearances on C-SPAN

U.S. House of Representatives
Preceded by George M. Rhodes	Member of the U.S. House of Representatives from Pennsylvania's 6th congressional district 1969–1993	Succeeded by Tim Holden
