= Epronaz =

Weed control herbicide

Names
- IUPAC name N-ethyl-N-propyl-3-(propylsulfonyl)-1H-1,2,4-triazole-1-carboxamide
- Preferred IUPAC name N-ethyl-3-(propane-1-sulfonyl)-N-propyl-1H-1,2,4-triazole-1-carboxamide
- Other names: эпроназ (Russian); 三唑磺 (Chinese); BTS 30 843; N-ethyl-N-propyl-3-(propylsulfonyl)-1H-1,2,4-triazole-1-carboxamide; 1-[ethyl(propyl)carbamoyl]-3-(propylsulfonyl)-1H-1,2,4-triazole; 1-(N-ethyl-N-propyfcarbamoyl)-3-propylsulphonyl-1,2,4-triazole

Identifiers
CAS Number	59026-08-3
3D model (JSmol)	Interactive image
ChemSpider	157653
PubChem CID	181208
UNII	4F4VEG4EMG
CompTox Dashboard (EPA)	DTXSID10207785
- InChI: InChI=1S/C11H20N4O3S/c1-4-7-14(6-3)11(16)15-9-12-10(13-15)19(17,18)8-5-2/h9H,4-8H2,1-3H3 Key: KCNUWLJAWRWKMO-UHFFFAOYSA-N
- SMILES: CCCN(CC)C(=O)N1C=NC(=N1)S(=O)(=O)CCC

Properties
Chemical formula	C_{11}H_{20}N_{4}O_{3}S
Molar mass	288.37 g·mol^{−1}
Melting point	51.5 °C (124.7 °F; 324.6 K)
Solubility in water	1.9 g/L
Solubility in acetone	1000 g/L
Solubility in benzene	500 g/L

Hazards
- Lethal dose or concentration (LD, LC)
LD_{50} (median dose)	400-800 mg/kg (mouse, oral); 100-200 mg/kg (rat, oral); 2,000 mg/kg (rat, dermal); 500 mg/kg (rabbit, dermal)
- Except where otherwise noted, data are given for materials in their standard state (at 25 °C [77 °F], 100 kPa). Infobox references

Expronaz is a pre-emergent herbicide, which also acts in early post-emergence to control annual grasses. Broadleaf weeds show some susceptibility, but only with very heavy doses. It was field trialled in the 1970s in the USA, Europe and Australia, but has not been commercialised.

== Chemical properties ==
Epronaz is fairly stable under heat but decomposes completely at 250 °C, and melts at 51.0 to 51.8 °C. Visible light does not degrade it, but UV light does, though it was only seen in solutions of water or methanol, not benzene, so the degradation may depend on radicals in solution. Epronaz does not have particularly high volatility, at about one 2000th of the vapour pressure of trifluralin. 70 °C, 0.0124 μmHg, and at 102C, 0.392 μmHg.

Its solubilities are 1.9 g/L (in water), 1000 g/L (in acetone), 167 g/L (in ethanol), 500 g/L (in benzene), 1000 g/L (in chloroform), 67 g/L (in diethyl ether), 4 g/L (in kerosene), 1 g/L (in light petroleum) and 333 g/L in xylene.

Its Wiswesser line formula is T5NN DNJ AVN3&2 CSW3.

Hydrolysis

Epronaz is very susceptible to hydrolysis, which is strongly dependent on temperature and pH. Its half-life under hydrolysis (time until half is gone) ranges from 688 days (at 20 °C and 6.3 pH) down to 44 minutes (70 °C and 8.1 pH). Temperature seems to have the stronger effect, as at 70 °C the half-life is reduced much more even at low pH (6.3) to 21 hours, than with high pH (8.1) and low temperature (20 °C), at 660 hours. It is expected that the hydrolysis products of epronaz are non-toxic, and that in typical soil conditions, it will be able to persist for a few weeks before breaking down.

Hydrolysis products include N-ethyl-N-propylcarbamate, 1,3-diethyl-1,3-dipropylurea, N-ethylpropylamine, and carbon dioxide. A free triazole may also be present, which readily forms water-soluble salts.

== Application ==
Epronaz is supposed to be sprayed at 1-2 kg/Ha of active ingredient to control all common grassy weeds. The symptoms of pre-emergent use are failure to germinate, or severe twisting and stunting of the seedling. In early post-emergent use, the weed ceases to grow, darkens in colour, suffers malformed leaves, and dies. It is supposed to be used on soyabean, peanut, maize, cotton and small grains.

Wheat, barley, maize and cotton can be injured by heavy applications, but show no symptoms at 1-2 kg/ha. Soyabean and peanut show no symptoms even at 8 kg/ha. There is evidence that epronaz might be effective even on soils with very much organic matter, where many other pre-emergence herbicides struggle. It can be applied post-emergently to grass until about the three-leaved stage.

Epronaz appears to work by root uptake from soil, with no contact activity.

== History ==
Work at the Boots Company (later Schering Agriculture) on N-carbamoyltriazoles started in 1969, after N-acyl-2,4,5-tribromo-imidazoles were found to be insecticidal and herbicidal post-emergently. Some N-dialkylcarbamoyl derivatives were active pre-emergently too, by a seemingly different mechanism to urea and triazine herbicides, suggesting the chance to discover a new class of herbicide. Of over 1000 molecules tested in this effort, epronaz was chosen for commercial development.

Preliminary tests were done at Lenton Research Station, Nottingham, and Koree Research Farm, Australia.
