= Daniel F. McDevitt =

American politician (1916–1965)

Member of the Pennsylvania House of Representatives for the First Berks County District
- In office 1961–1964
- Preceded by: Gus Yatron
- Succeeded by: Paul J. Hoh

Mayor of Reading, Pennsylvania
- In office 1956–1960
- Preceded by: James B. Bamford
- Succeeded by: John C. Kubacki

Personal details
- Born: January 15, 1916 Reading, Pennsylvania, U.S.
- Died: September 12, 1965 (aged 49) West Reading, Pennsylvania, U.S.
- Resting place: Gethsemane Cemetery; Laureldale, Pennsylvania
- Party: Democratic
- Spouse: Isabelle Shaner (m. 1943)
- Children: 1
- Occupation: Politician; Bar owner

Daniel F. McDevitt (January 15, 1916 – September 12, 1965) was an American politician who was Mayor of Reading, Pennsylvania from 1956 to 1960 and a member of the Pennsylvania House of Representatives from 1961 to 1964.

== Early life ==
McDevitt was born on January 15, 1916, to Thomas H. and Catherine (Heffelfinger) McDevitt. He served in the Infantry Branch of the United States Army during World War II and received two Bronze Star Medals and a Purple Heart. After the war, he operated the Reading House bar. When he became mayor, McDevitt transferred control of the bar to brother.

== Politics ==
In 1953, McDevitt was elected to the Reading city council in his first ever attempt at elected office. Two years later, he ran for mayor of Reading. He defeated former mayor John F. Davis by a 2 to 1 in the Democratic primary and beat city clerk Ralph W. D. Levan 18,556 votes to 11,674 in the general election. During his tenure, the West Shore Bypass was constructed, municipal parking lots were expanded, and the city's sewer system was upgraded.

After McDevitt took office, Abe Minker took control of the rackets in Reading. Casinos and houses of prostitution flourished in the city until federal intervention. On July 4, 1956, the Internal Revenue Service removed unlicensed gambling machines from the Reading House. Following the raid, McDevitt went to war with the Reading Eagle and Reading Times for publishing accounts of the incident. He closed the city hall press room, had police officers ticket newspaper delivery trucks every time they stopped to drop off papers, and had reporter Charles H. Kessler arrested for disorderly conduct for posing for a photograph in front of City Hall. The tickets were thrown out and the case against Kessler was dismissed. On September 7, 1957, United States Treasury agents raided the Reading House and arrested McDevitt's brother for tax violations related to an illegal horse book run at the bar. McDevitt was defeated for reelection by John C. Kubacki.

McDevitt was elected to the Pennsylvania House of Representatives in 1960 and reelected in 1962, but did not run for a third term in 1964.

On October 15, 1964, McDevitt and former city councilor Bruce R. Coleman were charged with extorting $2,000 from a company that sold three fire trucks to Reading in 1959. The district attorney's office dropped the case on March 22, 1965, following a successful habeas corpus petition by McDevitt, who acted as his own attorney.

In 1965, McDevitt ran for a seat on the Reading city council, but lost in the Democratic primary.

== Death ==
On September 9, 1965, McDevitt suffered a heart attack and was admitted to Reading Hospital's intensive care unit in serious condition. He died three days later and was buried in Gethsemane Cemetery in Laureldale, Pennsylvania. He was survived by his wife, Isabelle (Shaner) McDevitt, and daughter.
