= Wiswesser line notation =

Wiswesser line notation (WLN), invented by William J. Wiswesser in 1949, was the first line notation capable of precisely describing complex molecules. It was the basis of ICI Ltd's CROSSBOW database system developed in the late 1960s. WLN allowed for indexing the Chemical Structure Index (CSI) at the Institute for Scientific Information (ISI). It was also the tool used to develop the CAOCI (Commercially Available Organic Chemical Intermediates) database, the datafile from which Accelrys' (successor to MDL) ACD file was developed. WLN is still being extensively used by BARK Information Services. Descriptions of how to encode molecules as WLN have been published in several books.

== Examples ==
- 1H : methane
- 2H : ethane
- 3H : propane
- 1Y : isobutane
- 1X : neopentane
- Q1 : methanol
- 1R : toluene
- 1V1 : acetone
- 2O2 : diethyl ether
- 1VR : acetophenone
- ZR CVQ : 3-aminobenzoic acid
- QVYZ1R : phenylalanine
- QX2&2&2 : 3-ethylpentan-3-ol
- QVY3&1VQ : 2-propylbutanedioic acid
- L66J BMR& DSWQ IN1&1 : 6-dimethylamino-4-phenylamino-naphthalene-2-sulfonic acid
- QVR-/G 5 : pentachlorobenzoic acid
- T5NN DNJ AVN3&2 CSW3 : Epronaz
