= GoggleWorks =

United States historic place in Reading, Pennsylvania

- Willson, Thomas A. and Co.
- U.S. National Register of Historic Places
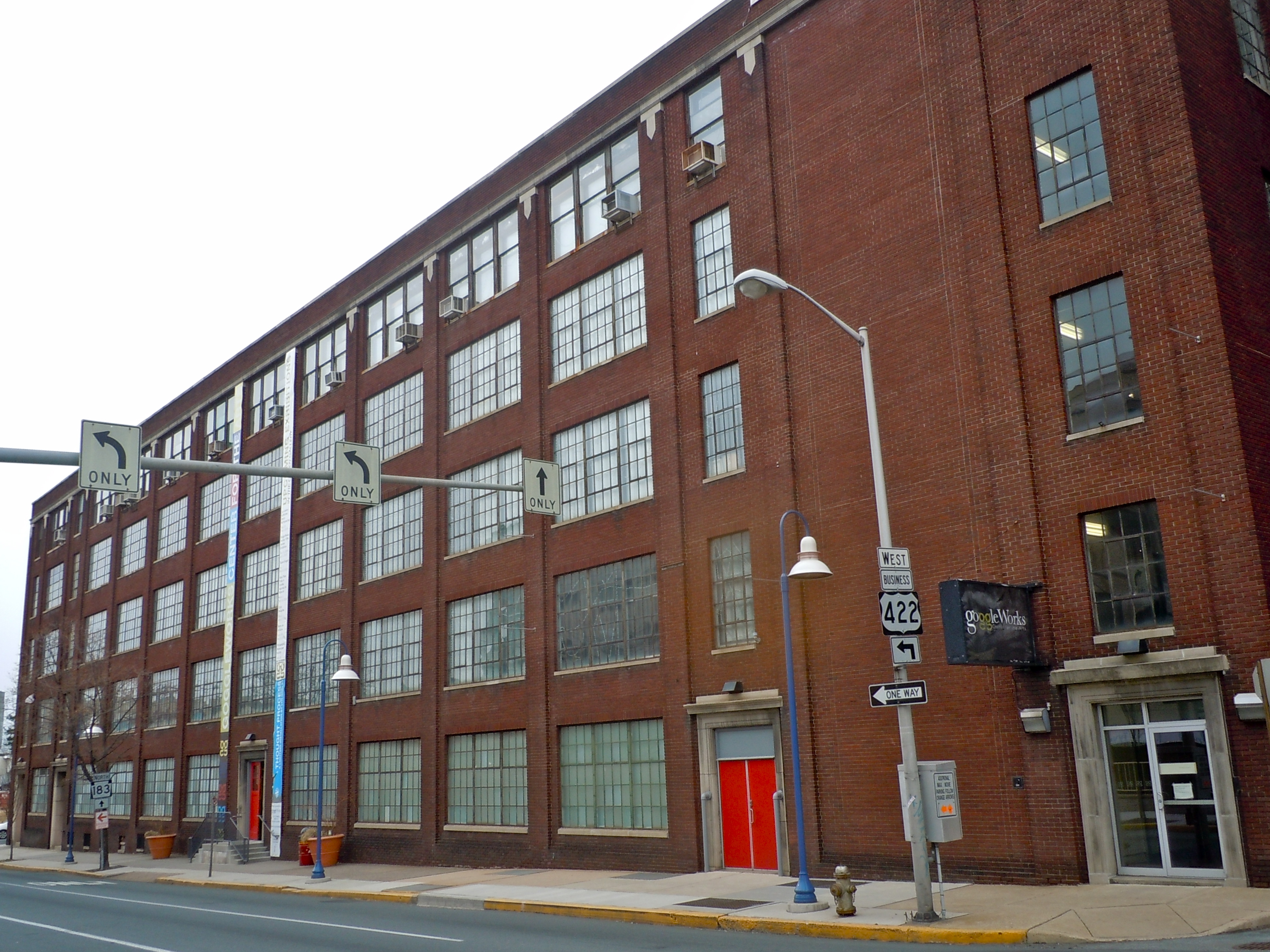
- Location: 201 Washington St., Reading, Pennsylvania
- Coordinates: 40°20′20″N 75°56′9″W
- Built: 1871
- Architect: Muhlenberg Brothers
- Architectural style: Moderne
- NRHP reference No.: 06000428
- Added to NRHP: May 24, 2006

GoggleWorks Center for the Arts
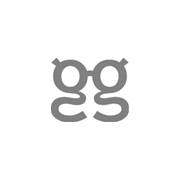

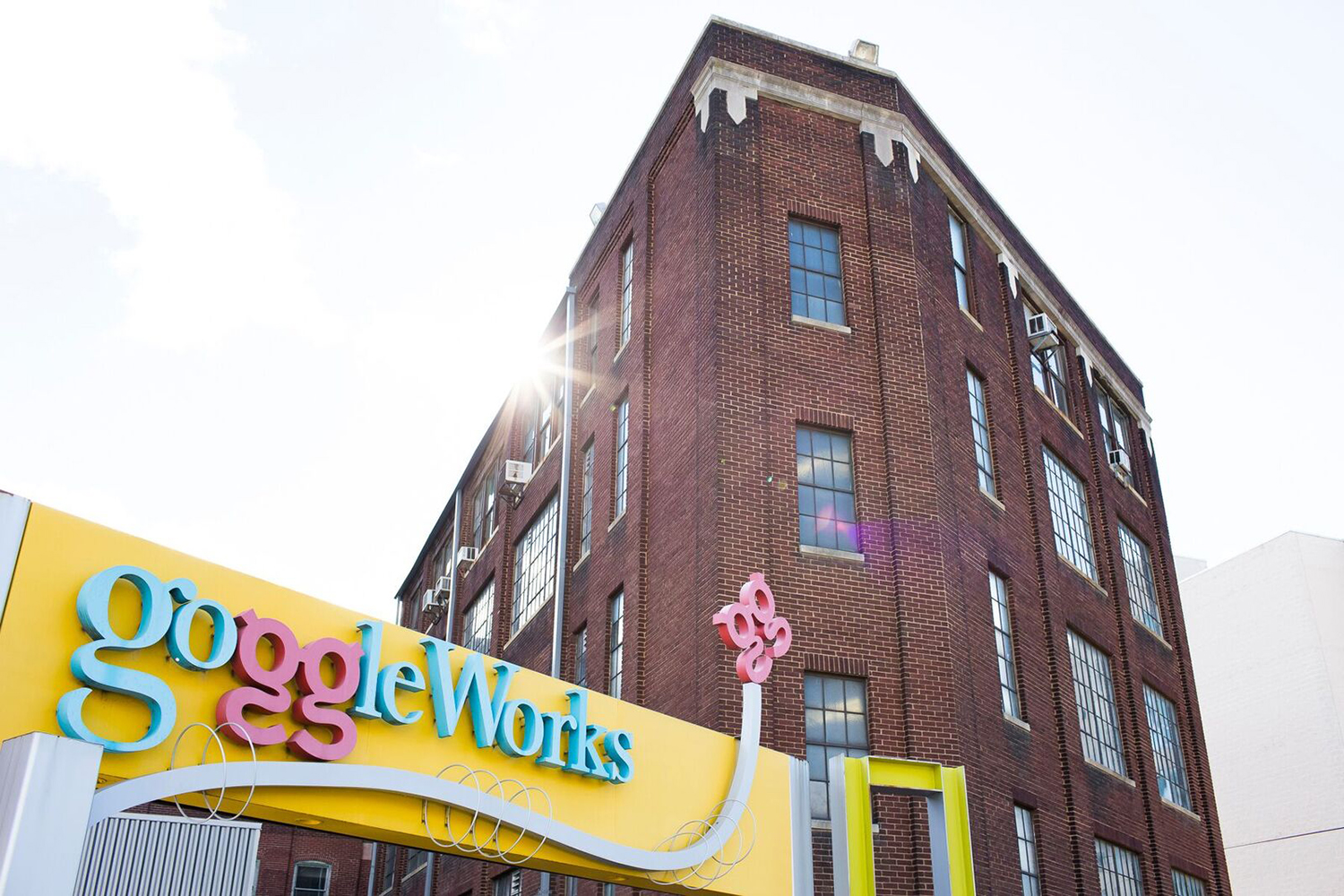
- Established: 2006
- Location: 201 Washington St., Reading, Pennsylvania
- Type: Art Center
- Visitors: 250,000 annually (free admission)
- Executive director: Levi Landis
- Parking: On-site, rear of building (no charge)
- Website: goggleworks.org

GoggleWorks Center for the Arts is a community art and cultural resource center located in Reading, Pennsylvania. The mission of the GoggleWorks is “to transform lives through unique interactions with art.”

Located in the former Willson Goggle Factory building, GoggleWorks Center for the Arts features eight teaching studios in ceramics, hot and warm glass, metalsmithing, photography, printmaking, woodworking and virtual reality; 35 juried artist studios; and headquarters of over 40 cultural organizations. GoggleWorks also includes several exhibition galleries, a 130-seat film theatre, a bar/restaurant, and store featuring handcrafted works by over 200 artists working within the building and beyond. Admission (excluding special events) and parking are always free.

The building was added to the National Register of Historic Places in 2006.

== History ==
In 2005, the concept of the GoggleWorks was the brainchild of Albert Boscov, Marlin Miller, and Irv Cohen. It opened its doors on September 18, 2005. In the October/November 2006 issue, American Crafts comments:

"Combining Boscov’s flair for promotion (he was chairman of the Boscov’s department store chain) with Miller’s longtime involvement in the craft world as a collector and advocate (he’s currently board chair of the Haystack Mountain School of Crafts), they envisioned a broad-based arts center built around artists’ studios... [T]he city got behind the idea, as did the state, which gave three million dollars in initial funding."

At 145,000 sq feet the GoggleWorks campus comprises the country's largest interactive visual art center. The complex also includes a 131-seat theatre, which presents art house films daily, a café, and store, which retails the work of over 200 individual artists from around the country.

Past executives include Diane Labelle and Phil Walz. Levi Landis, previously the executive director of the Philadelphia Folk Festival, was hired in 2016. Landis aggressively sought new funding and the Board undertook a strategic plan to reinvent program operations, launch new studios, and focus on long-term sustainability, which eventually led to the first annual financial surplus for GoggleWorks. In 2022, the nonprofit announced it has raised an endowment of $12m to sustain the operation.

GoggleWorks leaders have led an effort to expand its campus and vision, including an outdoor Art Park that debuted its first exhibit phase in October 2024 and “GoggleWorks 2”, a partnership with Our City Reading that will redevelop the last factory building on its campus into expanded art classrooms and studios, artist housing, and a culinary teaching kitchen led by Helping Harvest, the regional food bank.

== Programs ==
GoggleWorks, which is open from 9am to 9pm daily, offers rotating exhibitions and courses each semester in its studios along with other programs such as private workshops, Handcrafted Home, You Create We Make, Student Ambassador Fellowship, studio rentals, After School Arts Program (ASAP), scholarships, and continuing education for universities. New programs include the A.R.T. program for disabled artists and a new restaurant.

== Willson Goggle Factory ==
Founded by Gile J. Willson and his son Dr. Thomas A. Willson in 1871, Thomas A. Willson & Co. opened the first factory in the world to manufacture optical glass for lenses and reading glasses. Located at the corner of Washington and 2nd streets in Reading, Pennsylvania, the company became known for its innovative strides in addressing the occupational hazards faced by factory workers and is credited with launching the safety protection industry. Their first innovation was a protective lens that blocked dangerous and blinding rays produced by metal processing equipment. During the 1890s the company expanded the reach of the safety industry addressing hearing, respiratory and head protection equipment.

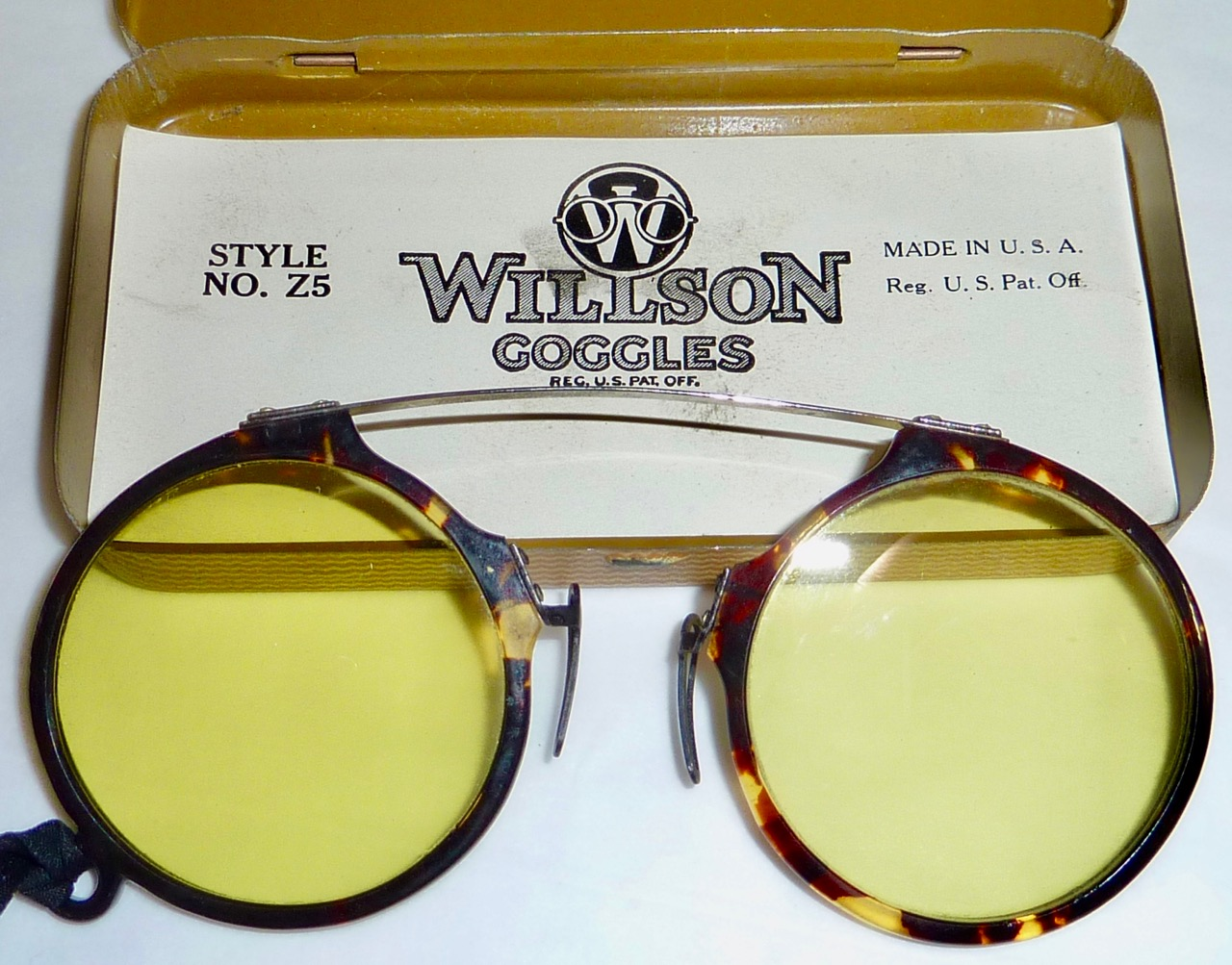
Willson Goggles pince-nez.

The National Safety Council was created in 1913, and T.A. Willson & Co. Inc. helped to set the uniform safety standards in industry. Through the 1920s, they expanded their line of safety equipment to the protection of coal miners, military personnel, and aviation. In 1929 the company became Willson Goggles, Inc., and by World War II, Willson Goggles was contributing to the war effort by making aviator goggles and high altitude oxygen masks for pilots in the military. In 1926, the company again changed its name to reflect an expanding product line. Willson Products, Inc. began to produce fashionable sunglasses, Willsonites, as modeled by the contestants of the 1938 Miss America pageant, and swim goggles, as worn by Florence Chadwick, who in 1950 was the first woman to swim both directions of the English Channel.

The company changed hands in 1956, but maintained the Willson products name through the atomic age and space age, still leading the safety industry in research and development of equipment to meet the needs of a technologically advancing society.

In the 1980s, Willson shifted its focus to the development of new varieties of respirators, gloves and other protective equipment. In 1989, Dalloz bought Willson products, and changed the company name to Dalloz Safety in 1997. Dalloz closed the plant in May 2002.

== See also ==
- Red Men Hall: Another Reading building designed by the Muhlenberg Brothers.
