= James Bryant (American football) =

American gridiron football player (born 1985)

Profile
- Position: Linebacker

Personal information
- Born: December 18, 1985 (age 40); Reading, Pennsylvania, U.S.
- Listed height: 6 ft 3 in (1.91 m)
- Listed weight: 257 lb (117 kg)

Career information
- High school: Reading (PA)
- College: Miami (FL) and Louisville
- NFL draft: 2009: undrafted

Career history
- Orlando Predators (2010); BC Lions (2011)*; Detroit Lions (2012)*; New Orleans VooDoo (2013); Pittsburgh Power (2014); Cleveland Gladiators (2015)*
- * Offseason or practice squad member only

Career AFL statistics
- Tackles: 79
- Sacks: 9.5
- PB: 3
- FF: 5
- Stats at ArenaFan.com

James Bryant (born December 18, 1985) is an American former professional football player who was a linebacker in the Arena Football League (AFL). He was signed by the Washington Redskins as an undrafted free agent in 2009. He played college football at Louisville.

== Early life and education ==
Bryant played for Reading Senior High School in Reading, Pennsylvania, where he rushed for 984 yards as a running back and had 314 tackles on the defense. He also had 18 sacks, five interceptions, and nin fumble recoveries in his high school career.

=== College career ===
Bryant played three seasons at the University of Miami and appeared in 32 games primarily on offense as a backup fullback from 2004 to 2007.

Bryant later transferred to Louisville, where he sat out one year. During his final year of eligibility in 2008, James appeared in 10 games for the Louisville, recording 100 tackles, two interceptions, one punt return for 26 yards, one blocked punt, and recording 17 tackles for loss.

== Professional career ==
=== Washington Redskins ===
Bryant was signed by the Washington Redskins as an undrafted free agent following the 2009 NFL draft. He participated in the mini camp and was released.

=== Boxing ===
After he was released by the Redskins, Bryant tried professional boxing for a while. He appeared as a heavyweight in 5 boxing matches and has a 4–1 record with 4 knockouts.

The 6-foot-3, 245-pound pure puncher is 2–0, both wins by first-round knockouts in scheduled four-rounders. His next bout is June 15 on the Tuesday Night Fights Live card at the Hard Rock Live.

Bryant won his Feb 16 debut over 244-pound Roy Boykins at the 2-minute mark and his second fight on April 13 over Andrew Maxwell at the 2:19 mark.

=== Orlando Predators ===
Bryant signed with the Orlando Predators in 2010 as a defensive end and played three games. In those three games Bryant recorded four sacks, forced 9 interceptions and one kickoff return for a touchdown.

=== BC Lions ===
Bryant played for the BC Lions in the Canadian Football League during the 2011 season. He was signed in May and was released in October 25. He did not record any offensive or defensive statistics.

=== Detroit Lions ===
The Detroit Lions signed Bryant as a free agent on March 16, 2012. Bryant was released on August 27, 2012, as a part of Lions' last round of cut prior to the 2012 season.

=== New Orleans VooDoo ===
Bryant played the 2013 season with the New Orleans VooDoo of the Arena Football League.

=== Pittsburgh Power ===
Bryant was assigned to the Pittsburgh Power on October 10, 2013.

=== Cleveland Gladiators ===
Bryant was assigned to the Cleveland Gladiators on May 7, 2015.
