= Albert Boscov =

American businessman and philanthropist

- Born: September 22, 1929; Reading, Pennsylvania, U.S.
- Died: February 10, 2017 (aged 87); Reading, Pennsylvania, U.S.
- Education: Drexel University
- Occupations: Chairman, Boscov's Department Store, LLC.
- Spouse: Eunice Boscov
- Children: Ruth Aichenbaum; Ellen Boscov; Meg Boscov
- Parent(s): Solomon Boscov; Ethel Fogelson Boscov
- Relatives: Jim Boscov, nephew

Albert Boscov (September 22, 1929 – February 10, 2017) was an American businessman and philanthropist. He was the long-time head of Boscov's Department Stores and served as the company's chairman and CEO until retiring in 2015. In 2009, Boscov led a buyout of the chain in order to rescue it from bankruptcy.

Boscov died on February 10, 2017, from pancreatic cancer.

== Early life and education ==
Boscov was born in Reading, Pennsylvania, in 1929, the son of immigrants Solomon and Ethel Boscov. His father had arrived in Reading from Russia, in 1911 where he founded a dry goods store in a row house in 1918.

Boscov graduated from Reading Senior High School in Reading and Drexel University in Philadelphia. At Drexel, Boscov started his first business, a sandwich delivery service called U-Eat-Em. Boscov was a member of the Sigma Alpha Mu fraternity at Drexel. He served in the Navy during the Korean War. After military service, he returned to Reading and joined his father's business.

== Career ==
After taking over the family business, Boscov expanded the original store at Ninth and Pike Streets in Reading. In 1962, he opened Boscov's West in Sinking Spring, Pennsylvania, the company's first full-line store. Boscov's North opened in Muhlenberg Township, Pennsylvania, in 1965, and Boscov's East opened in Exeter Township, Pennsylvania, in 1967.

During the 1970s and 1980s, Boscov and his brother-in-law, Edwin Lakin, expanded the chain to Maryland, Delaware, New York, and New Jersey. By 2005, Boscov's had 39 stores with $1 billion in sales.

In early 2006, Boscov retired as chairman, transferring control to his nephew, Ken Lakin, who soon after purchased ten department store locations from Federated Department Stores by borrowing heavily.

In August 2008, Boscov's filed for Chapter 11 Bankruptcy, citing deteriorating consumer and credit conditions during the 2008 financial crisis. In October 2008, Albert Boscov and his brother-in-law Edwin Lakin both confirmed that they would be making a bid to purchase back the chain, competing against Versa Capital Management, Inc. On November 4, 2008, it was confirmed that Boscov's would be selling its assets back to the pair, canceling the earlier agreement with Versa, and keeping the 98-year-old chain under family control. Under Boscov's guidance the chain recovered, and in March 2015 retired for the second time and handed control of the company to his nephew, Jim Boscov. The chain continued to thrive pursuing a slow-growth policy, and opened its 50th store, in Bridgeport, West Virginia, on October 7, 2023.

== Personal life ==
In 1959, he married Eunice, with whom he had three children: Ruth (married to Michael Aichenbaum); Ellen Boscov (married to Todd Taylor), and Meg Boscov (married to Randall Brown).

== Death ==
Boscov died on February 10, 2017, from pancreatic cancer in Reading. He was an Ashkenazi member of the Jewish community of Reading.

== Philanthropy ==
Boscov donated money to the Penn State Berks campus for its library, and to Genesius Theatre for restoration and further improvement of its main-stage building in Reading. He also performed at Genesius Theatre as Tevye from Fiddler on the Roof at Genesius's "Broadway Musical Revue".

== Legacy ==
On June 22, 2000, the section of U.S. Route 422 Business and U.S. Route 422 between Pennsylvania Route 562 and Shelbourne Road in Exeter Township, Pennsylvania, was designated by an act of the Pennsylvania General Assembly as the Albert Boscov Commemorative Highway in honor of Boscov.

In 2005, Boscov co-founded Goggleworks Center for the Arts in Reading, Pennsylvania, renovating the former Willson Goggle Factory into one of the largest art centers in the country. GoggleWorks was one of several development projects that he spearheaded to catalyze downtown revitalization in Reading. There he established the city's Entertainment Square, which today features several anchor institutions along with restaurants and businesses, including an IMAX theatre, Miller Center for the Arts, GoggleWorks Apartment Complex, and Boscov Plaza, along with GoggleWorks Center for the Arts.

In 2010, Politics magazine named Boscov one of the most influential Democrats in Pennsylvania.
