= Red Men Hall (Reading, Pennsylvania) =

- U.S. National Register of Historic Places
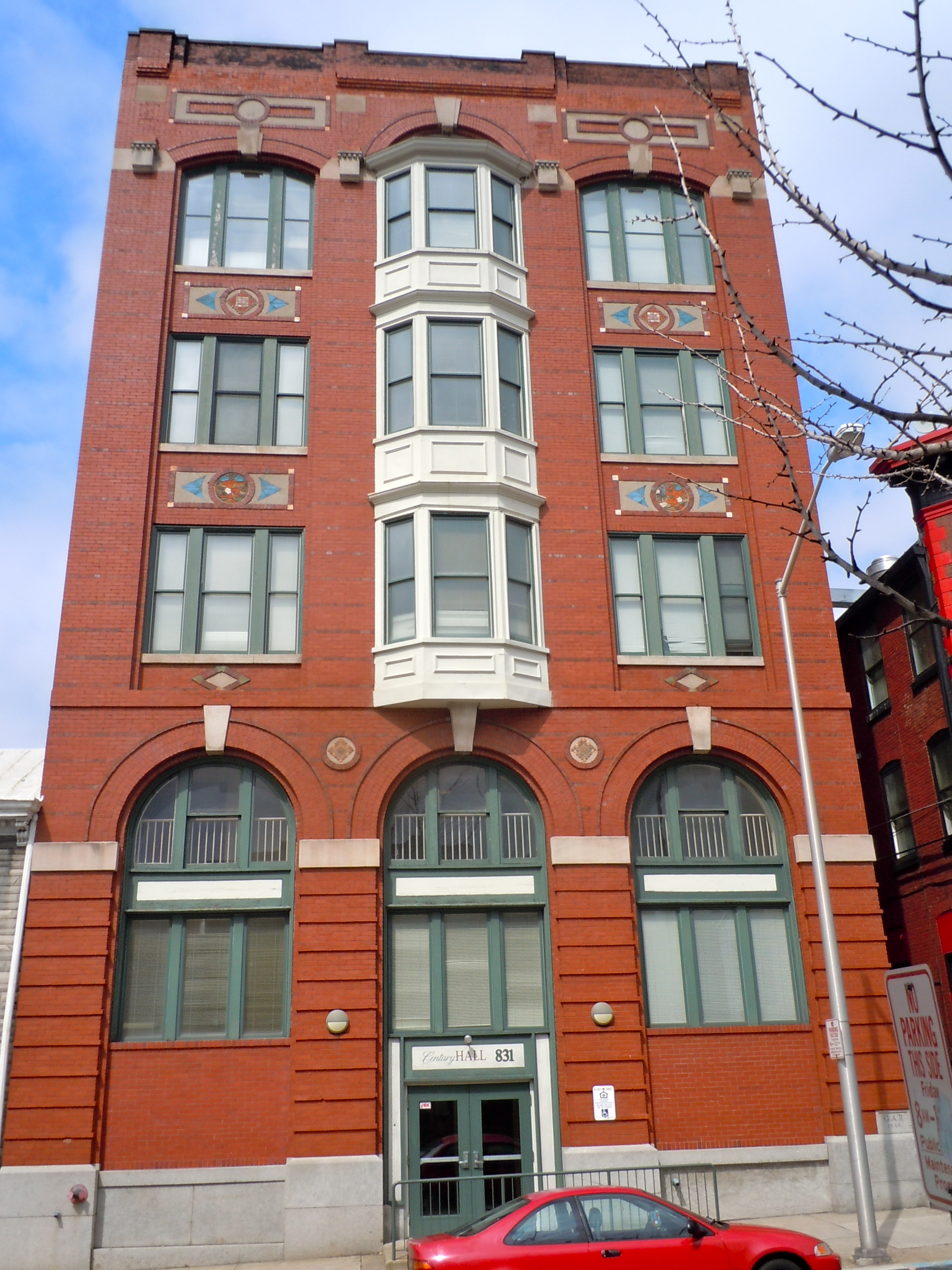
- The front of Red Men Hall

- Location within Pennsylvania Location within the United States
- Location: 831 Walnut Street; Reading, Pennsylvania 19601
- Coordinates: 40°20′21″N 75°55′21″W
- Built: 1900
- Architect: Muhlenberg Brothers
- Architectural style: American Craftsman, Renaissance Revival
- NRHP reference No.: 00000843
- Added to NRHP: July 27, 2000

The Red Men Hall, later known as Century Hall, is a historic four-story building located in Reading, Pennsylvania.

== Red Men ==
The building originally served as a meeting place for the local lodge or "wigwam" of the Improved Order of Red Men. The Red Men are a fraternal organization which imitate perceived Native American customs. However, this location consisted exclusively of German Americans. The organization had numerous chapters in Pennsylvania beginning in the nineteenth century.

== Building ==
Constructed by the Red Men in 1900, the four-story brick facade building displays American Craftsman style architectural designs with Renaissance Revival elements, and includes decorative tiles by Henry Chapman Mercer. Later, the structure served as a rental hall called Century Hall, capitalizing on the building being built at the turn of the century.

The National Register of Historic Places added the structure in 2000. The building now consists of 15 low-income senior housing units.

== See also ==
- GoggleWorks: Another Reading building designed by the Muhlenberg Brothers
- List of Improved Order of Red Men buildings and structures
- National Register of Historic Places listings in Berks County, Pennsylvania
