= Reading Senior High School =

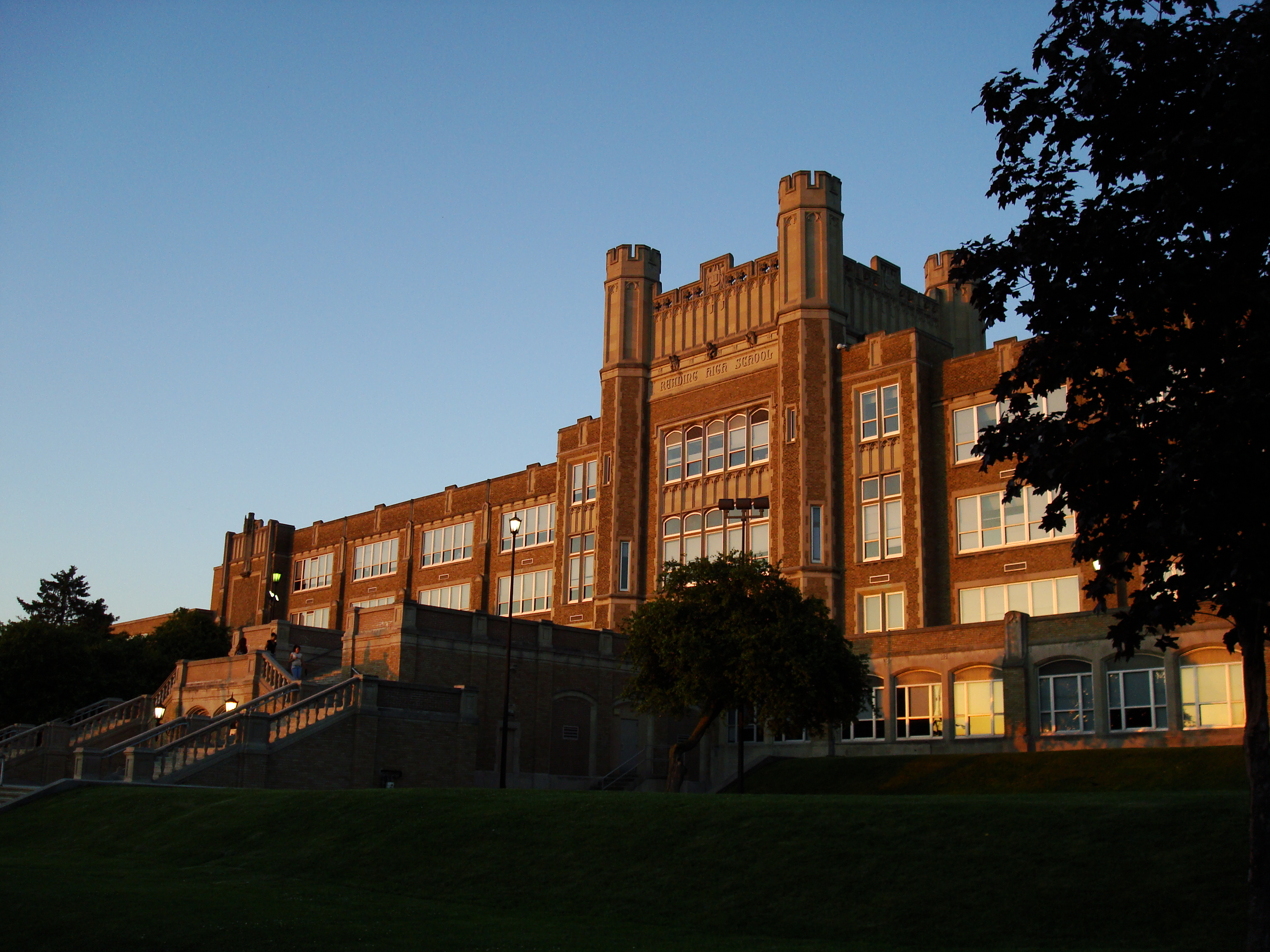
- Reading Senior High School in May 2008

Location
- 801 North 13th Street; Reading, Pennsylvania 19604; United States; 40.3477°N 75.9107°W

Information
- Other name: The Castle on The Hill
- Type: Public high school
- Motto: Latin: Dic cur hic (Tell me why you are here)
- Established: 1927
- School district: Reading School District
- NCES School ID: 422004000859
- Principal: Jessica Di Blasi
- Teaching staff: 253.50 (on an FTE basis)
- Grades: 9–12
- Enrollment: 4,779 (2023–2024)
- Student to teacher ratio: 18.85
- Colors: Red and Black
- Athletics conference: PIAA District 3
- Mascot: Red Knight
- Team name: Red Knights
- Yearbook: Red Knight Yearbook
- Website: www.readingsd.org/o/rhs

Reading Senior High School, colloquially known as The Castle on The Hill, is a 9–12 public high school in Reading, Pennsylvania. It was established in 1927 and is part of the Reading School District. With an enrollment of 5,213 as of the 2022–23 school year, it is the largest traditional high school in Pennsylvania and one of the largest high schools in the nation.

== Student life ==
The school supports a broad range of extracurricular activities. In the 2020–2021 school year, students could participate in Academic Challenge, Aevidium, Art Club, Baba Na Kaka International, Ecology, Knight Vision, Mock Trial, Peer Mentoring, Project Peace, E-Sports, National Honor Society, Sign Language Club, Strategic Gaming Club, Student Council, Tabletop Roleplay, World Language Club, STEM Robotics, and Yearbook.

== Athletics ==
The school's mascot is the Red Knight. According to the PIAA directory, the District funds participation in the following sports:

Girls

- Basketball – AAAAAA
- Bowling – AAAAAA
- Cheerleading – AAAAAA
- Cross Country – AAA
- JROTC Drill Team – AAA
- Field Hockey – AAA
- Indoor Track and Field – AAAA
- Soccer (Fall) – AAAA
- Softball – AAAAAA
- Swimming and Diving – AAA
- Girls' Tennis – AAA
- Track and Field – AAA
- Volleyball – AAAA
- Water Polo – AAAA

Boys

- Baseball – AAAAAA
- Basketball- AAAAAA
- Bowling – AAAAAA
- Cross Country – AAA
- JROTC Drill Team – AAA
- Football – AAAAAA
- Golf – AAA
- Indoor Track and Field – AAAA
- Soccer – AAAA
- Swimming and Diving – AAA
- Tennis – AAA
- Track and Field – AAA
- Volleyball – AAA
- Water Polo – AAAA
- Wrestling – AAA

== Notable alumni ==
- Sian Barbara Allen, actress
- Joseph A. Baer, United States Army Brigadier general during World War II
- Albert Boscov, businessman, philanthropist, and former chairman of Boscov's
- James Bryant, former professional football player, Detroit Lions
- Thomas Caltagirone, former Pennsylvania State Representative
- Henry Dickinson Green, former U.S. Congressman
- Manny Guzman Jr., politician
- Stu Jackson, former head coach, New York Knicks
- Donyell Marshall, former professional basketball player, Chicago Bulls, Cleveland Cavaliers, Golden State Warriors, Minnesota Timberwolves, Philadelphia 76ers, Utah Jazz, and Seattle SuperSonics
- Maurio McCoy, professional skateboarder
- Lenny Moore, former professional football player, Baltimore Colts, and Pro Football Hall of Fame inductee
- Stephen Mull, former U.S. ambassador to Lithuania
- Curtis R. Reitz, law professor, University of Pennsylvania Law School
- Lonnie Walker IV, professional basketball player, Maccabi Tel Aviv, formerly Brooklyn Nets
- William Wiswesser, chemist and pioneer in chemical informatics
- Gus Yatron, former U.S. Congressman
