= Reading School District =

School district in Pennsylvania, United States

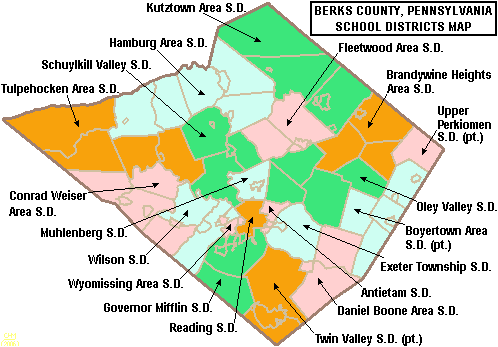

Address
- 800 Washington Street Reading, Berks County, Pennsylvania; United States

District information
- Grades: PreK-12

Students and staff
- Students: 19,178 students (2015–16)

Other information
- Website: http://www.readingsd.org/

Reading School District is a large, urban public school district that serves Reading, Pennsylvania, the fourth-most populous city in Pennsylvania. The school district encompasses approximately 10 square miles (26 km^{2}).

According to 2020 federal census data, it serves a resident population of 95,112. In 2009, the Reading School District residents’ per capita income was $13,086, while the median family income was $31,067. In the Commonwealth, the median family income was $49,501 and the United States median family income was $49,445, in 2010.

The district's student demographics reflect the racial diversity of Reading; the city's 95,112 residents include 66.5% Latino/Hispanic (vs. 58% in 2010 and 37% in 2000), 21.4% White (vs. 28% in 2010), and 12.6% Black (vs. 11% in 2010). In the 2015–2016 school year, the district contained 19,178 students.

== Schools ==
=== Elementary schools ===
Students in preschool and kindergarten through grade 4 attend the following schools:

- Amanda E. Stout
- Glenside
- Lauer's Park
- Millmont
- Northwest Area
- Riverside
- Tyson-Schoener
- 10th & Green
- 10th & Penn
- 12th & Marion
- 13th & Green
- 13th & Union
- 16th & Haak

=== Middle schools ===
Students in grade 5 through grade 8 attend the following schools:

- Northeast Middle School
- Northwest Middle School
- Southern Middle School
- Southwest Middle School
- Central Middle School

=== High school ===
- Reading Senior High School (grades 9-12)

== Extracurriculars ==
The Reading School District offers a wide variety of clubs, activities and an extensive sports program at the high school and 4 middle schools.

=== Sports ===
The District funds:

Boys

- Baseball - AAAA
- Basketball- AAAA
- Bowling - AAAA
- Cross country - AAA
- Football - AAAA
- Golf - AAA
- Indoor track and field - AAAA
- Soccer - AAA
- Swimming and diving - AAA
- Tennis - AAA
- Track and field - AAA
- Volleyball - AAA
- Water polo - AAAA
- Wrestling - AAA

Girls

- Basketball - AAAA
- Bowling - AAAA
- Cheer - AAAA
- Cross country - AAA
- Field hockey - AAA
- Indoor track and field - AAAA
- Soccer (Fall) - AAAA
- Softball - AAAA
- Swimming and diving - AAA
- Girls' tennis - AAA
- Track and field - AAA
- Volleyball - AAA
- Water polo - AAAA

Middle school sports:

Boys

- Baseball
- Basketball
- Cross country
- Football
- Soccer
- Track and field
- Wrestling

Girls

- Basketball
- Cross country
- Field hockey
- Soccer (Fall)
- Softball
- Track and field
- Volleyball
