= Philadelphia Folk Festival =

Music festival in Upper Salford, Pennsylvania, US

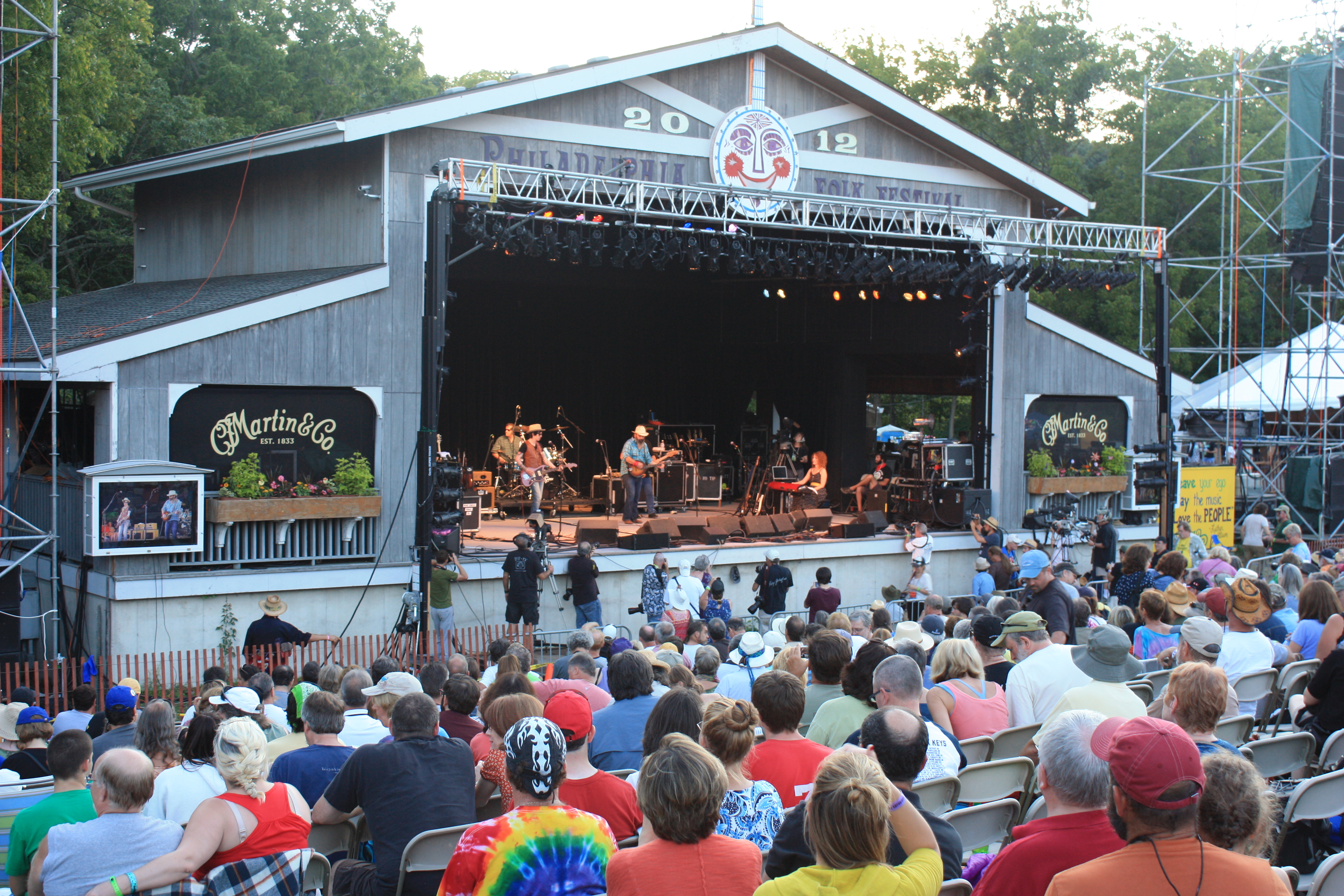
- Genre: Folk; country; blues; folk rock
- Dates: Four days in the third week of August
- Locations: Upper Salford Township, Pennsylvania, U.S.
- Years active: 1962–2022, 2024-2025
- Founders: Kenneth S. Goldstein, Bob Siegel, Gene Shay, David Baskin, Esther Halprin, et al.
- Website: folkfest.org

The Philadelphia Folk Festival is a folk music festival held annually at Old Pool Farm in Upper Salford, Pennsylvania, just outside of Philadelphia.

The four-night, three-day festival is produced and run by the non-profit Philadelphia Folksong Society and staffed almost entirely by volunteers.

The event hosts contemporary and traditional artists in genres under the umbrella of Folk, including World/Fusion, Celtic, Singer/Songwriter, Folk Rock, Country, Klezmer, Blues, Bluegrass, Hip/Hop, Spoken Word, Storytelling, and Dance.

Each year the event hosts over 35,000 visitors and nearly 7,000 campers at the Old Pool Farm. The event presents over 75 hours of music with local, regional, and national talent on its stages.

The Festival is one of the longest-running folk music festivals in the United States, since it began in 1962.

== History ==
According to the Philadelphia Folk Festival's "About Fest" website, "The Philadelphia Folk Festival emerged as a pivotal event in folk music history in the United States. Inaugurated in 1962 at Wilson Farm near Paoli, Pennsylvania, the festival featured renowned artists such as Reverend Gary Davis, Bonnie Dobson, and Pete Seeger. Despite expecting 2000 attendees, the festival drew in 2500 individuals, showcasing the growing interest in folk music. Over the years, the festival became a platform for musicians to share their talents and connect with like-minded individuals, contributing to the resurgence of folk music in the 1960s. This inaugural event laid the foundation for Philadelphia as a center for folk music culture".

The Philadelphia Folksong Society has presented the Philadelphia Folk Festival since 1962. Gene Shay and folklorist Kenneth S. Goldstein founded the festival, along with George Britton, Bob Seigel, David Baskin, Esther Halpern, Tossi Aaron and others. Shay acted as Master of Ceremonies since its inception until shortly before his death and Goldstein served as Program Director for the first 15 years. The festival was originally held on Wilson Farm in Paoli, Pennsylvania.

The Thursday night Camp Stage show has previously been hosted by WXPN radio for the nationally syndicated World Cafe with David Dye.

The Philadelphia Folksong Society presents the Philadelphia Folk Festival and has had a full-time, year-round staff. The most recent PFS Executive Director, Justin Nordell, served in that capacity from 2007 to 2023, while past E.D.s include Lauri Barish and Levi Landis.

This festival went online in 2020 and 2021, raising over $200,000 to support artists out of work, as live concerts were cancelled caused by the COVID-19 pandemic. The Festival returned as a hybrid and in-person live event for 2022.

The hosting organization, the Philadelphia Folksong Society announced a pause in production, cancelling the 2023 festival for the first time in its 50 year history. It resumed under new leadership with a successful festival in 2024 and plans for the 2025 festival are underway.

== See also ==
- Newport Folk Festival
