= Philadelphia Folksong Society =

American folk music organization based in Philadelphia

- Formation: 1957; 69 years ago
- Founders: George Britton; Mike Marmel; Joe Aronson; Other folk community members
- Founded at: Philadelphia, Pennsylvania, USA
- Type: Nonprofit
- Headquarters: Philadelphia, Pennsylvania, USA
- Coordinates: 40°2′7.37″N 75°13′0.38″W
- Members: 3,000+ (2014)
- Revenue: $1,363,879 (2019)
- Expenses: $1,743,492 (2019)
- Staff: 2 (2022)
- Website: www.pfs.org

Philadelphia Folksong Society (PFS) is a nonprofit educational organization dedicated to preserving the past, promoting the present, and securing the future of folk music and related forms of expression through education, presentation and participation. It is perhaps best known for hosting the Philadelphia Folk Festival, the longest continuously running outdoor music festival in North America, and has been held every single year without pause since its 1962 inception.

== History ==
PFS was founded in 1957 by George Britton, Mike Marmel, Joe Aronson, and others in the Philadelphia folk community who wanted to establish a group dedicated to the enjoyment and preservation of folk music. The organization's archives make up one fifth of Philadelphia music history. Archive contents include Folk Festival documents such as programs, posters, and newspaper clippings; recorded performances at PFS from artists such as Bob Dylan, John Denver, and Jim Croce; and photos of musicians, among other records. According to Executive Director Justin Nordell, "folk music is all about the oral tradition of passing things down and making this history accessible." PFS has been focused on digitizing this information for the last several years, particularly during the COVID-19 pandemic. In 2018, PFS moved from the Mount Airy neighborhood of Philadelphia to an abandoned church in Roxborough. The Folk School, administrative offices, and the Society's first-ever dedicated performance space are housed in this building.

== Programs ==
PFS holds concerts, music classes, workshops, and festivals, many of which were held remotely during the COVID-19 pandemic. The Philadelphia Music Co-op is a professional development initiative that shares vital information such as how to do taxes as a musician, how to get re-booked at a venue, and how to improve web pages. PFS Presents and PFS Sings are concert series. In 2007, to celebrate PFS' 50th anniversary, musicians paid tribute to Woody Guthrie by playing "original music set to never-before-heard lyrics from the archives." A 2011 benefit concert featured Doc Watson accompanied by David Holt and Tony Trischka. The Odyssey of American Music program was founded in 1974 and sends musicians into schools lacking arts programs to "enhance the students' understanding of our culture and history" with music.

== Festivals ==
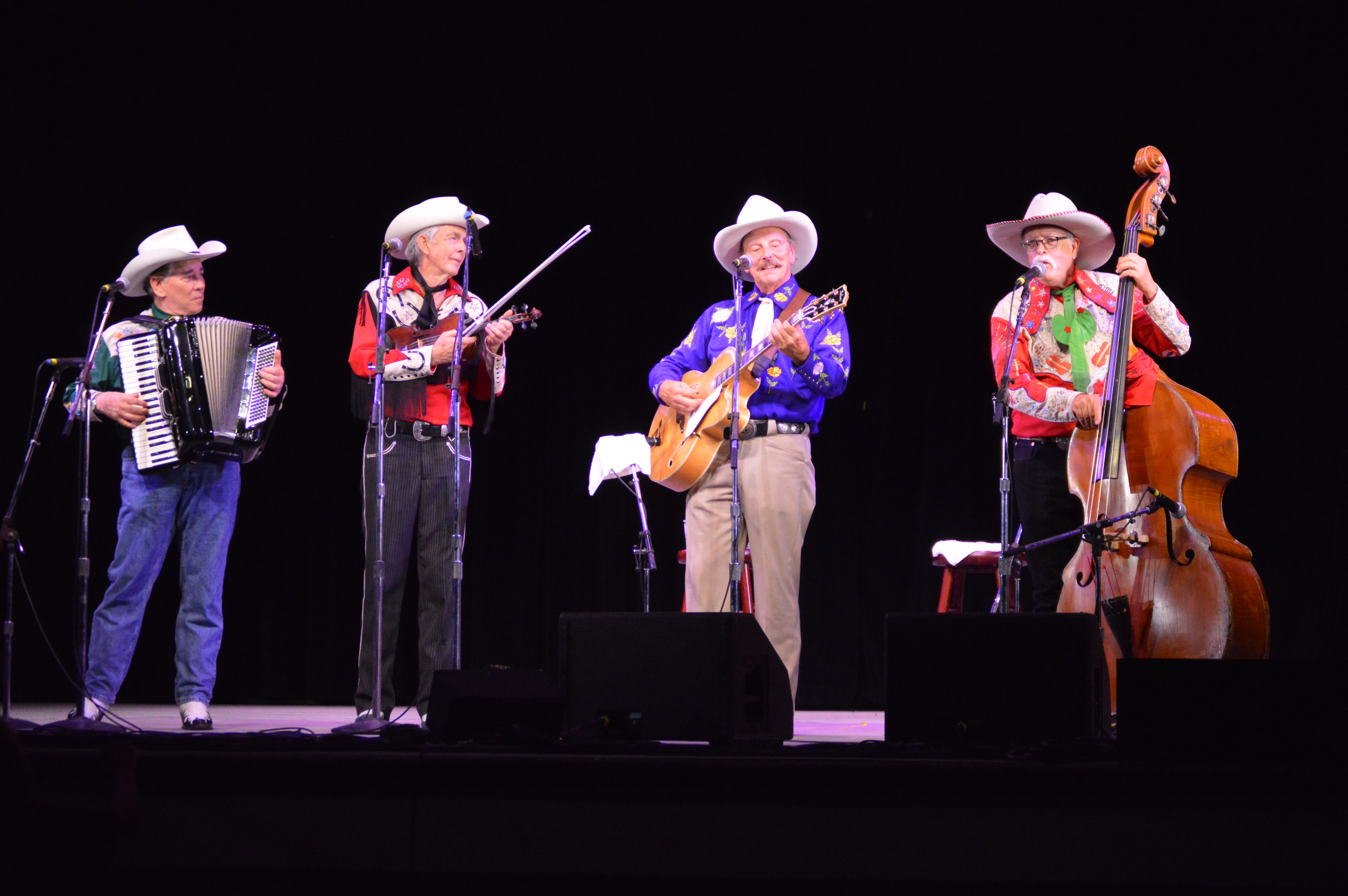
Riders in the Sky performing at Philadelphia Folk Festival in 2018

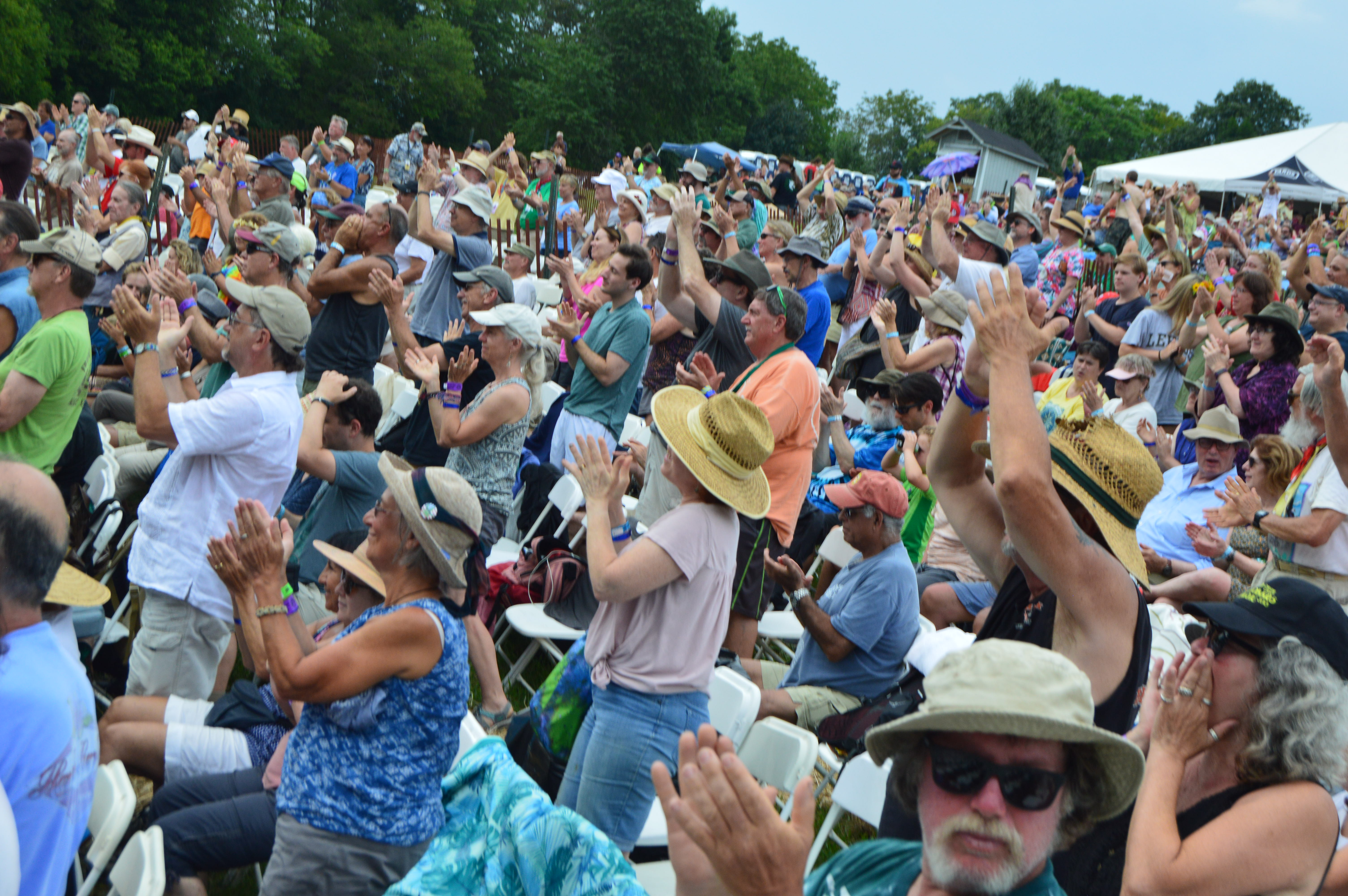
Philadelphia Folk Festival 2018

=== Mini Festivals ===
PFS holds four one-or-two-day festivals throughout the year. Cabin Fever takes place in February. Spring Thing was first held in May 1976 with "music, dancing, and crafts," as well as on-site camping. The one-day Heartwood Music Festival, which features music and food and craft booths, kicked off in July 2015. The Fall Fling was first held in September 1977 and Folk Faire was added to its title in 2014. The mini-festival includes "song circles, jam sessions, open mic, crafts, workshops, and camping," in addition to food and beer vendors and musical performances.

=== Philadelphia Folk Festival ===
Started in 1962, the Philadelphia Folk Festival (PFF) is a festival "intended to be a 'showpiece for a broad spectrum of American folk music.'" PFS views the term folk music "as an umbrella term [that] covers so many different subgenres... [with an emphasis on] storytelling," including hip hop, rap, Cajun music, Americana, indie folk, blues, alternative folk, old-time folk, and bluegrass. As such, the festival has a wide variety of musical performances. The 2018 lineup boasted 111 artists. In 2016, 35,000 attendees and 7,000 campers enjoyed 75 hours of music on eight different stages. Many attendees have an intergenerational connection to the festival through family members who had previously attended; PFS Executive Director Justin Nordell's parents met at PFF. Proceeds initially supported the University of Pennsylvania's new Folklore and Folklife department in the 1960s. Acts such as puppeteers, jugglers, storytellers, and aerialists, as well as locations for kids to do crafts and listen to folk music, are available in addition to the main stages.

The festival lasts four days each summer and is run largely by volunteers, who number between 2,000 and 2,500. PFF was held at the Homestead, a farm in Paoli, Pennsylvania, from 1962 through 1966; at Spring Mountain Ski Slope in Upper Salford in 1966; and in an Upper Salford park between 1967 and 1970 before settling at the Old Pool Farm, also in Upper Salford, in 1971. The 2020 and 2021 festivals were held digitally due to the COVID-19 pandemic. In 2020, people from 86 countries purchased tickets to watch the festival. The 2022 edition is planned to be in-person but will have remote access as well.
