= Laureldale, Pennsylvania =

Borough in Pennsylvania, US

- Borough
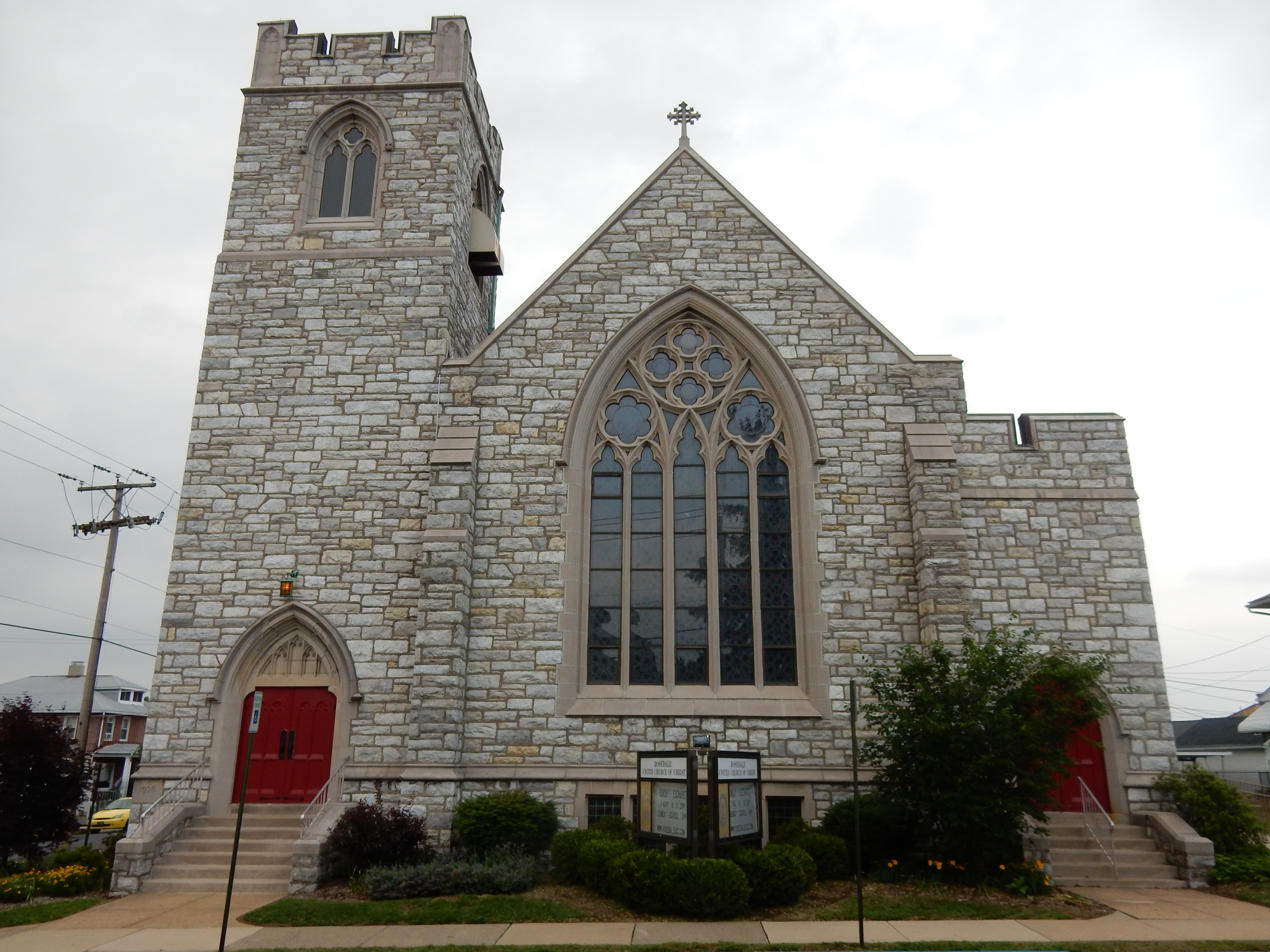
- Rosedale United Church, built in Laureldale in 1928

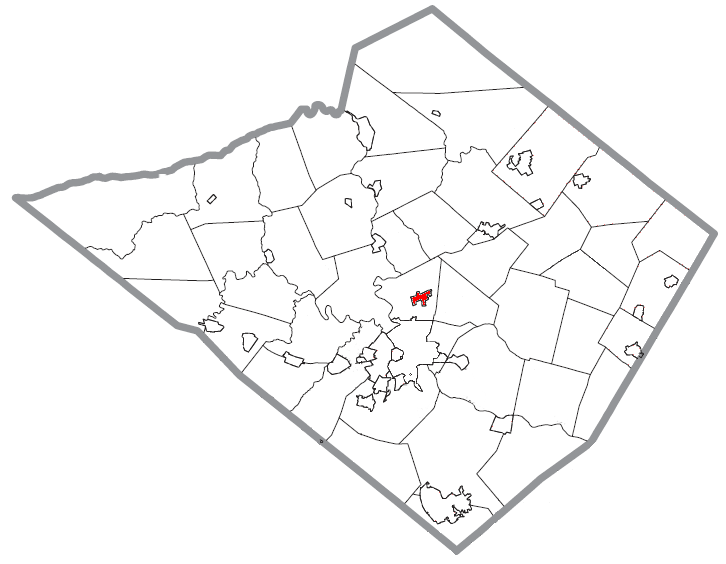
- Location of Laureldale in Berks County, Pennsylvania

- Location in Pennsylvania Location in the United States
- Coordinates: 40°23′21″N 75°54′51″W
- Country: United States
- State: Pennsylvania
- County: Berks

Area
  - Total: 0.81 sq mi (2.10 km^{2})
  - Land: 0.81 sq mi (2.10 km^{2})
  - Water: 0 sq mi (0.00 km^{2})
- Elevation: 400 ft (120 m)

Population (2020)
  - Total: 4,277
  - Density: 5,283/sq mi (2,039.8/km^{2})
- Time zone: UTC-5 (EST)
  - Summer (DST): UTC-4 (EDT)
- ZIP Code: 19605
- Area codes: 610 and 484
- FIPS code: 42-41768
- Website: www.laureldaleboro.org

Laureldale is a borough in Berks County, Pennsylvania, United States. The population was 4,277 at the 2020 census.

== Geography ==
According to the U.S. Census Bureau, the borough has a total area of 0.8 square miles (2.1 km^{2}), all land.

== Demographics ==
Historical population
| Census | Pop. | Note | %± |
|---|---|---|---|
| 1940 | 3,397 | | — |
| 1950 | 3,585 | | 5.5% |
| 1960 | 4,051 | | 13.0% |
| 1970 | 4,519 | | 11.6% |
| 1980 | 4,047 | | −10.4% |
| 1990 | 3,726 | | −7.9% |
| 2000 | 3,759 | | 0.9% |
| 2010 | 3,911 | | 4.0% |
| 2020 | 4,277 | | 9.4% |

=== 2020 census ===
As of the 2020 census, Laureldale had a population of 4,277. The median age was 38.4 years. 23.9% of residents were under the age of 18 and 17.5% of residents were 65 years of age or older. For every 100 females there were 92.7 males, and for every 100 females age 18 and over there were 91.0 males age 18 and over.

100.0% of residents lived in urban areas, while 0.0% lived in rural areas.

There were 1,626 households in Laureldale, of which 33.6% had children under the age of 18 living in them. Of all households, 42.9% were married-couple households, 18.4% were households with a male householder and no spouse or partner present, and 29.2% were households with a female householder and no spouse or partner present. About 24.6% of all households were made up of individuals and 11.1% had someone living alone who was 65 years of age or older.

There were 1,695 housing units, of which 4.1% were vacant. The homeowner vacancy rate was 0.6% and the rental vacancy rate was 2.8%.

Racial composition as of the 2020 census
| Race | Number | Percent |
|---|---|---|
| White | 2,696 | 63.0% |
| Black or African American | 204 | 4.8% |
| American Indian and Alaska Native | 22 | 0.5% |
| Asian | 39 | 0.9% |
| Native Hawaiian and Other Pacific Islander | 0 | 0.0% |
| Some other race | 817 | 19.1% |
| Two or more races | 499 | 11.7% |
| Hispanic or Latino (of any race) | 1,530 | 35.8% |

=== 2010 census ===
At the 2010 census there were 3,911 people living in the borough. The racial makeup of the borough was 86.8% White, 2.5% African American, 0.4% Native American, 0.9% Asian, 0.0% Pacific Islander, 6.8% from other races, and 2.7% from two or more races. Hispanic or Latino of any race were 16.1%.

== Infrastructure ==
=== Transportation ===
As of 2006, there were 15.08 miles (24.27 km) of public roads in Laureldale, of which 1.91 miles (3.07 km) were maintained by the Pennsylvania Department of Transportation (PennDOT) and 13.17 miles (21.20 km) were maintained by the borough.

No numbered highways pass directly through Laureldale. The main thoroughfares in the borough include Kutztown Road and Elizabeth Avenue, which intersect near the center of town. The nearest numbered highway is U.S. Route 222 Business, which passes just west of the borough.
