= 1860–61 United States House of Representatives elections =

House elections for the 37th U.S. Congress

- August 6, 1860 – October 24, 1861

All 180 seats (Note: An additional 59 seats were vacant due to the secession of the Confederacy.) in the United States House of Representatives 91 seats needed for a majority
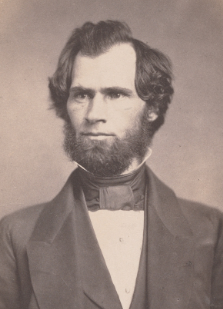

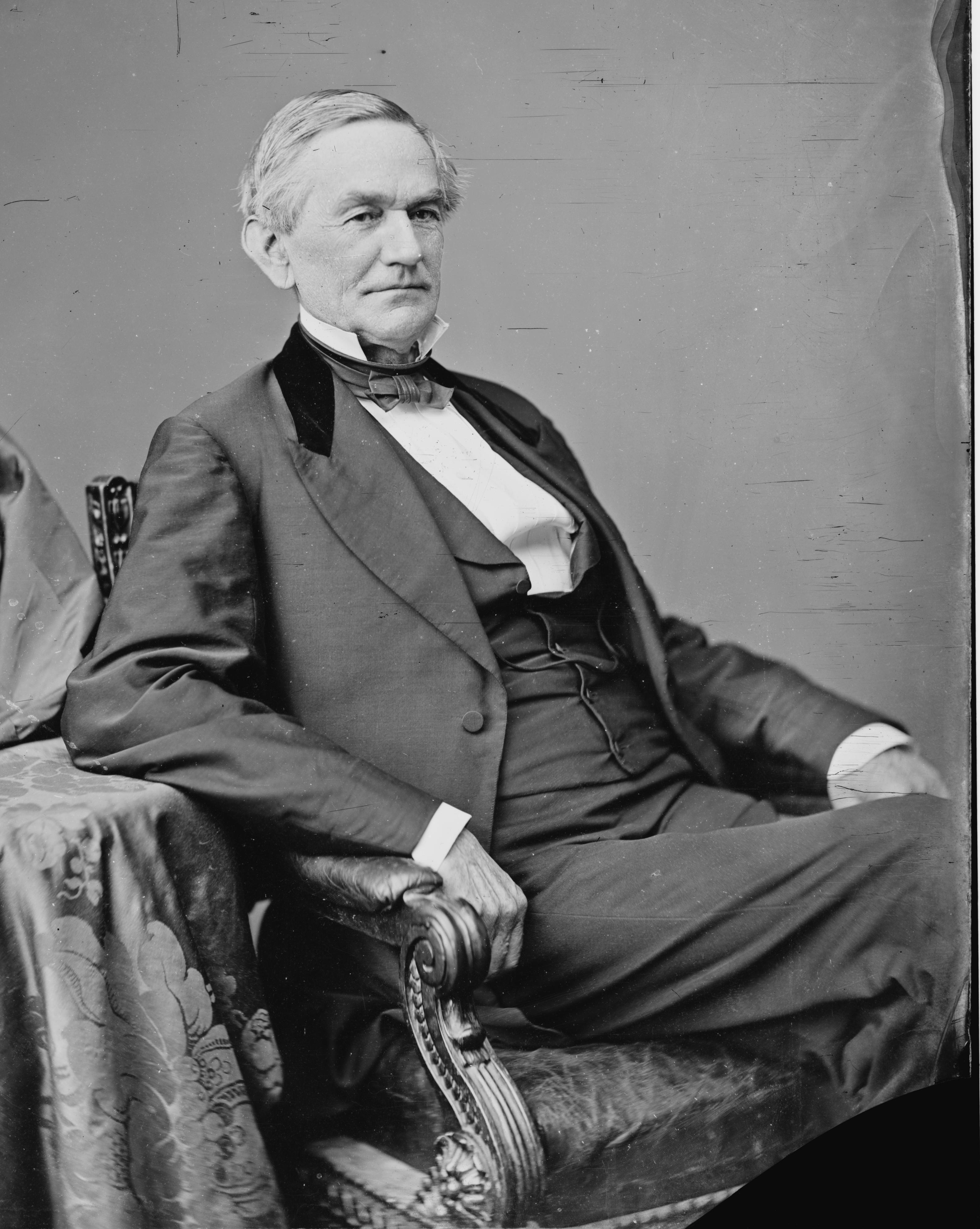

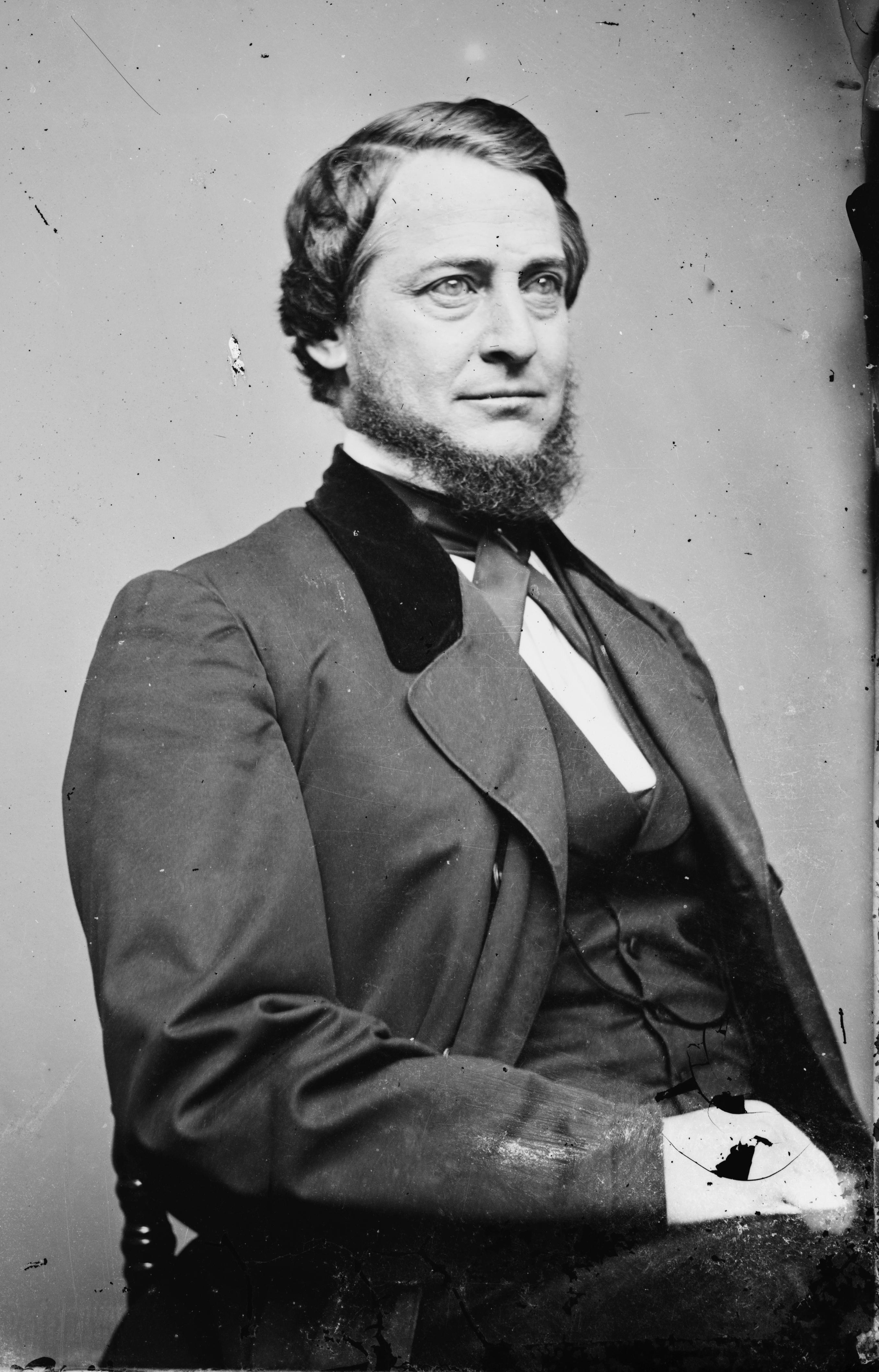

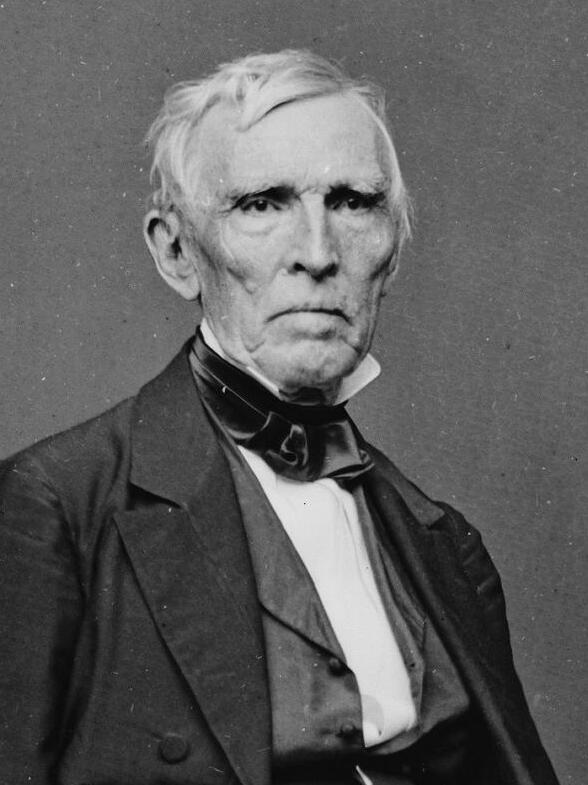
	Majority party	Minority party	Third party
Leader	Galusha A. Grow	John S. Phelps & Clement Vallandigham (Note: The Democratic members split their votes between nine different candidates in the 1861 Speaker of the United States House of Representatives election. Phelps and Vallandigham led the other Democratic candidates with seven votes each before shifts.)	John J. Crittenden
Party	Republican	Democratic	Union
Leader's seat	Pennsylvania 14th	Missouri 6th Ohio 3rd	Kentucky 8th
Last election	113 seats, 35.20% (41.80%) (Note: Figures in brackets exclude districts left vacant by secession.)	85 (44) seats, 48.16% (45.14%)	Pre-creation
Seats won	108 (Note: Republicans lost 4 seats in special elections held before the July 4, 1861, beginning of Congress, reducing their caucus to 104 seats.)	43 (Note: Democrats gained 2 seats in special elections held before the July 4, 1861, beginning of Congress, increasing their caucus to 45 seats.)	22 (Note: Including 12 Unionists, 9 Union Democrats, and 1 Union and Peace. Unionists gained 2 seats in special elections held before the July 4, 1861, beginning of Congress, increasing their caucus to 24 seats.)
Seat change	▼6	▼52	▲22
Popular vote	1,836,570	1,492,022 (Note: Excluding votes from districts that seceded after Election Day; see below.)	183,506 (Note: Including votes for Unionists and Union and Peace.)
Percentage	48.25%	39.20%	4.82%
Swing	▲13.05 (5.26) pp	▼8.96 (5.94) pp	New party
	Fourth party	Fifth party	Sixth party
Party	Constitutional Union	Southern Rights	People's
Last election	Pre-creation	Pre-creation	0 seats, 0.23%
Seats won	4	1	1
Seat change	▲4	▲1	▲1
Popular vote	103,892	36,845	7,732
Percentage	2.73%	0.97%	0.20%
Swing	New party	New party	▼0.03 pp
	Seventh party
Party	Independent
Last election	15 (10) seats, (Note: Including 8 Anti-Lecompton Democrats and 7 independent Democrats.); 6.80% (5.84%)
Seats won	1 (Note: Including 1 independent Democrat, James E. Kerrigan, elected from New York's 4th congressional district.)
Seat change	▼14
Popular vote	112,119 (Note: Including votes for Breckinridge Democrats, War Democrats, Independents, Independent Democrats, Douglas Democrats, and Anti-Lecompton Democrats.)
Percentage	2.95%
Swing	▼3.85 (2.89) pp
- Results; Democratic gain Democratic hold Republican gain Republican hold Constitutional Union gain Unionist gain Southern Rights gain People's gain Independent hold Not seated No election
Speaker before election
William Pennington
Republican
Elected Speaker
Galusha A. Grow
Republican

The 1860–61 United States House of Representatives elections took place between August 6, 1860, and October 24, 1861, to elect 180 representatives and seven non-voting delegates to the 37th United States Congress. The Republican Party lost seats but gained a majority in the chamber following the withdrawal of the representatives from the Confederate States of America.

The Republicans were the largest party in the House following the 1858–59 United States House of Representatives elections. The Republican victory in the 1860 United States presidential election precipitated the secession of 11 slave states between December 1860 and June 1861. Secession interrupted elections for the 37th Congress, which had already taken place in 15 Union states and three states now part of the Confederacy. The absence of the Southern Democrats severely diminished the number of Democratic representatives, which fell to 43. Unionists in the border states and loyal parts of the Confederacy won 22 seats, while Kentucky's Henry C. Burnett was the only secessionist elected to the United States House of Representatives.

The Constitutional Union Party won four seats, including two from Rhode Island, where Democrats and conservative Republicans formed the governing coalition. A coalition of Republicans and Constitutional Unionists carried the single seat representing Delaware's at-large congressional district, while one independent Democrat was elected in New York.

Republicans lost seats in special elections held in the spring of 1861. The absence of the representatives from the Confederacy enabled the Republican majority to elect the speaker and other officers without the support of other parties. Galusha A. Grow was elected after shifts on the first ballot over fellow Republican Francis P. Blair, Jr.; the Democratic minority split their votes between 12 minor candidates.

== Background ==
=== Secession ===
Sixty-five (Note: Dubin counts 62 vacancies at the beginning of the 37th Congress, in addition to two representatives from California not yet elected. Fifty-nine seats were vacant for the duration of the Congress, and six Unionists from Tennessee and Virginia were seated after Congress convened.) seats were vacant when the 37th Congress met on July 4, 1861, following the secession of the Confederacy. Three states which later seceded (Arkansas, Florida, and South Carolina) held elections in 1860, electing seven Democrats and two independents who subsequently declined to take their seats. Several unionist districts in Tennessee and Virginia elected representatives who were seated along with the rest of the incoming class. These were the only congressional elections held south of the border states before the beginning of Congress. Several districts under Union Army control held special elections after July 4, but only two Louisiana Unionists were seated.

Confederate states had sent 46 Democrats, eight Opposition members, six Whigs, five Independent Democrats, and one Know Nothing to the 36th Congress. The loss of these representatives significantly diminished the size of the House to the benefit of the Republicans, who gained a majority in the chamber for the first time in their history.

Loyal slave states sent 15 Unionists and five Democrats to the 37th Congress. Four parties elected one representative each from the border states: Republican Francis P. Blair Jr. from Missouri's 1st congressional district, Constitutional Unionist James S. Rollins from Missouri's 2nd congressional district, People's representative George P. Fisher from Delaware's at-large district, and Southern Rights representative Henry C. Burnett from Kentucky's 1st congressional district.

=== Realignment ===
The elections cemented a political realignment that saw a complete reversal of party fortunes in Congress between 1856 and 1860. Democrats controlled both the House and Senate following the 1856 United States elections, while James Buchanan's victory over John C. Frémont retained Democratic control of the presidency. Democrats held the Senate after 1859, but opposition parties won over two-thirds of the seats in the lower chamber as a result of the 1858–59 United States House of Representatives elections. Republicans and Unionists retained control of the House and gained two-thirds of the seats in the Senate following elections in 1860 and 1861, reversing the previous Democratic majorities. Democrats held less than 25 percent of the seats in the House following secession, with the House Democratic Caucus divided between War Democrats and anti-war Copperheads led by representative Clement Vallandigham.

Party representation in Congress, 1857–63
Congress	35th 1857–59	36th 1859–61	37th 1861–63
U.S. House of Representatives
Seats (±)	237 (+3)	238 (+1)	183 (–55)
Republicans	90 (38%)	116 (49%)	108 (59%)
Unionists	0 (0%)	0 (0%)	31 (17%)
Know Nothings & Oppositionists	14 (6%)	39 (16%)	0 (0%)
Democrats	133 (56%)	83 (35%)	44 (24%)
U.S. Senate
Seats (±)	66 (+4)	68 (+2)	50 (–18)
Republicans	20 (30%)	26 (38%)	31 (62%)
Unionists	0 (0%)	0 (0%)	3 (6%)
Know Nothings	5 (8%)	2 (3%)	0 (0%)
Democrats	41 (62%)	38 (58%)	15 (30%)

=== Swing ===
Republicans received no votes in elections held in 1858 and 1859 in 57 districts that later formed the Confederacy. Because most of these districts did not hold elections for the 37th Congress, the swing from the last election overstates the magnitude of the Republican gains as a percentage of the national popular vote. The following table calculates the notional results of the last elections in the districts which sent representatives to the 37th Congress, including Tennessee's 1st congressional district and Virginia's 1st congressional district. These figures exclude Arkansas, Florida, and South Carolina, which held elections in 1860 but seceded after Election Day.

Hypothetical results of the 1858–59 United States House of Representatives elections in the Union
Parties	Seats		Popular vote	
Parties	1858–59	%	Votes	%
Democratic Party	44	24.31	1,437,474	45.14
Republican Party	113	64.09	1,331,318	41.80
Opposition Party	9	3.87	106,664	3.35
Know Nothing	5	2.21	112,790	3.53
Anti-Lecompton Democrats	5	2.76	98,632	3.10
Independents	0	0.00	32,950	1.03
Anti-Administration Democrats	3	1.66	29,117	0.91
Independent Democrats	2	1.10	20,051	0.63
People's Party	0	0.00	7,452	0.23
Anti-Tax Party	0	0.00	3,903	0.12
Union Democrats	0	9.00	2,038	0.06
Others	0	0.00	2,347	0.07
Total	181	100.00	3,184,736	100.00

== Results ==
=== Federal ===
↓
43	7	108	22
Democratic	(Note: 4 Constitutional Unionists, 1 Independent Democrat, 1 People's, and 1 Southern Rights.)	Republican	Unionists

1860–61 United States House of Representatives elections
Parties	Seats				Popular vote (Note: Including all districts holding elections in 1860 and 1861.) (All districts)		Popular vote (Note: Excluding votes from Arkansas, Florida, and South Carolina.) (Union)	
Parties	1858–59	1860–61	±	%	Votes	%	Votes	%
Republican Party	113	108	▼6	60.00	1,836,570	47.14	1,836,570	48.25
Democratic Party	85	43	▼52	23.89	1,544,980	39.66	1,492,022	39.20
Unionists	0	22	▲22	12.22	183,506	4.71	183,479	4.82
Constitutional Union Party	0	4	▲4	2.22	103,892	2.67	103,892	2.73
Breckinridge Democrats	0	0	Steady	0.00	51,596	1.32	51,596	1.36
Southern Rights Party	0	1	▲1	0.56	36,845	0.95	36,845	0.97
War Democrats	0	0	Steady	0.00	35,449	0.91	35,449	0.93
Independents	0	0	Steady	0.00	28,001	0.72	842	0.02
Independent Democrats	7	1	▼6	0.56	18,224	0.47	18,224	0.48
Confederate States Congress	0	0	Steady	0.00	17,969	0.46	17,969	0.47
States' Rights Party	0	0	Steady	0.00	15,836	0.42	15,836	0.41
People's Party	0	1	▲1	0.56	7,732	0.20	7,732	0.20
Opposition Party	15	0	▼15	0.00	5,172	0.13	—N/a	
Douglas Democrats	0	0	Steady	0.00	761	0.02	761	0.02
Anti-Lecompton Democrats	8	0	▼8	0.00	275	0.01	275	0.01
Others	11	0	▼11	0.00	8,943	0.23	4,972	0.13
Total	237	180	▼57	100.00	3,895,751	100.00	3,806,464	100.00

=== Results by state ===
State	Type	Date	Total seats	Democratic		Republican		Unionists		Others	
State	Type	Date	Total seats	Seats	Change	Seats	Change	Seats	Change	Seats	Change
Kansas	At-large	December 1, 1859 (Note: The winner of this election served in both the 36th and 37th Congresses.)	1	0	Steady	1	▲1	0	Steady	0	Steady
Oregon	At-large	June 4, 1860	1	1	Steady	0	Steady	0	Steady	0	Steady
Arkansas	District	August 6, 1860	2	2 (Note: Did not take seat(s) due to secession.)	Steady	0	Steady	0	Steady	0	Steady
Missouri	District	August 6, 1860	7	5	▼1	1	▲1	0	Steady	1 (Note: Outgoing: 1 Know Nothing Incoming: 1 Constitutional Unionist)	Steady
Vermont	District	September 4, 1860	3	0	Steady	3	Steady	0	Steady	0	Steady
Maine	District	September 10, 1860	6	0	Steady	6	Steady	0	Steady	0	Steady
Florida	At-large	October 1, 1860	1	1	Steady	0	Steady	0	Steady	0	Steady
South Carolina	District	October 8–9, 1860	6	6	Steady	0	Steady	0	Steady	0	Steady
Indiana	District	October 9, 1860	11	4	Steady	7	Steady	0	Steady	0	Steady
Iowa	District	October 9, 1860	2	0	Steady	2	Steady	0	Steady	0	Steady
Ohio	District	October 9, 1860	21	8	▲2	13	▼2	0	Steady	0	Steady
Pennsylvania	District	October 9, 1860	25	6	▲1	19	▼1	0	Steady	0	Steady
Delaware	At-large	November 6, 1860 (Election Day) (Note: In 1845, Congress set a uniform date for choosing presidential electors (5 Stat. 721). Other elections were unaffected by this law, but the date was gradually adopted by the states for congressional elections as well.)	1	0	▼1	0	Steady		Steady	1 (Note: Incoming: 1 People's)	▲1
Illinois	District	November 6, 1860 (Election Day)	9	5	Steady	4	Steady	0	Steady	0	Steady
Massachusetts	District	November 6, 1860 (Election Day)	11	0	Steady	10	▼1	0	Steady	1 (Note: Incoming: 1 Constitutional Unionist)	▲1
Michigan	District	November 6, 1860 (Election Day)	4	0	▼1	4	▲1	0	Steady	0	Steady
Minnesota	At-large	November 6, 1860 (Election Day)	2	0	Steady	2	Steady	0	Steady	0	Steady
New Jersey	District	November 6, 1860 (Election Day)	5	3	▲1	2	▼1	0	Steady	0	Steady
New York	District	November 6, 1860 (Election Day)	33	10	▲3	23	▼3	0	Steady	0	Steady
Wisconsin	District	November 6, 1860 (Election Day)	3	0	▼1	3	▲1	0	Steady	0	Steady
Late elections (after the March 4, 1861 beginning of the term)
New Hampshire	District	March 12, 1861	3	0	Steady	3	Steady	0	Steady	0	Steady
Connecticut	District	April 1, 1861	4	2	▲2	2	▼2	0	Steady	0	Steady
Rhode Island	District	April 3, 1861	2	0	Steady	0	▼2	0	Steady	2 (Note: Incoming: 2 Constitutional Unionists)	▲2
Virginia	District	May 23, 1861 (Note: Two districts held elections on October 24, 1861, but the winners of these races were not seated by the House.)	13 (Note: Including 9 vacancies. No elections were held in 8 districts; the representative-elect from Virginia's 1st congressional district was not seated by the House.)	0	▼12	0	Steady	4	▲4	0 (Note: Outgoing: 1 Opposition)	▼1
Maryland	District	June 13, 1861	6	0	▼3	0	Steady	6	▲6	0 (Note: Outgoing: 3 Know Nothings)	▼3
Kentucky	District	June 20, 1861	10	0	▼5	0	Steady	9	▲9	1 (Note: Including: Outgoing: 5 Opposition; Incoming: 1 Southern Rights)	▼4
Late elections (after the July 4, 1861 beginning of the first session of the 37th Congress)
Tennessee	District	August 1, 1861	10 (Note: Including 7 vacancies. No elections were held in 6 districts; the representative-elect from Tennessee's 1st congressional district was captured en route to Washington and did not take their seat.)	0	▼3	0	Steady	3	▲3	0 (Note: Outgoing: 7 Opposition)	▼7
California	At-large	September 4, 1861	3 (Note: California elected three representatives, one more than the number allocated by the 1850 United States census. The third representative was not seated until June 3, 1862, following reapportionment.)	0	Steady	3	▲1	0	Steady	0	Steady
Seceded states not holding full elections
Alabama	District	None	7	0	▼7	0	Steady	0	Steady	0	Steady
Georgia	District	None	8	0	▼6	0	Steady	0	Steady	0 (Note: Outgoing: 1 Know Nothing, 1 Opposition)	▼2
Louisiana	District	None	4	0	▼3	0	Steady	0	Steady	0 (Note: Outgoing: 1 Opposition)	▼1
Mississippi	District	None	5	0	▼5	0	Steady	0	Steady	0	Steady
North Carolina	District	None	8	0	▼5	0	Steady	0	Steady	0 (Note: Outgoing: 3 Opposition)	▼3
Texas	District	None	2	0	▼2	0	Steady	0	Steady	0	Steady
Total (Note: Excluding states that seceded during the American Civil War.)			180 59 vacancies	44 24.44%	▼51	108 60.00%	▼8	22 12.22%	▲22	6 3.33%	▼18

=== Results by region ===
Historians of the Civil War era subdivide the Northern United States into upper and lower regions. The Lower North (also called the Border North) is normally defined as the free states sharing a border with one or more slave states; in 1860, this included Kansas, Illinois, Indiana, Iowa, New Jersey, Ohio, and Pennsylvania. The remaining free states—New England (Connecticut, Maine, Massachusetts, New Hampshire, Rhode Island, Vermont), Michigan, Minnesota, New York, and Wisconsin—constituted the Upper North. During the 1850s, the Upper North was solidly Republican, while the Lower North's population included large numbers of immigrants and the descendants of White Southerners favorable to the Democratic Party. The Southern United States was split between the Upper South, which included the border states (Delaware, Kentucky, Maryland, and Missouri) and the Middle South (Arkansas, North Carolina, Tennessee, and Virginia), and the Lower South, comprising the states of Alabama, Florida, Georgia, Mississippi, South Carolina, and Texas. In 1861, the Lower South states were the first to secede, while the Middle South and the border states remained in limbo. California and Oregon, on the West Coast of the United States, were geographically isolated from the rest of the country.

Region	Total seats	Democratic	Republican	Unionists	Constitutional Union	Independent Democrat	Other	Vacancies
Upper North	71	11	56	0	3	1	0	0
Lower North	74	26	48	0	0	0	0	0
Border South	24	5	1	15	1	0	2	0
Middle South	33	0	0	7	0	0	0	26
Lower South	33	0	0	0	0	0	0	33
West Coast	4	1	3	0	0	0	0	0

=== Bar charts ===
Popular vote
Republican	47.52%
Democratic	40.03%
Unionists	4.69%
Constitutional Union	2.69%
Southern Rights	1.09%
People's	0.20%
Opposition	0.13%
Independents and others	3.65%

House seats
Republican	60.00%
Democratic	23.89%
Unionists	12.22%
Constitutional Union	2.22%
People's	0.56%
Southern Rights	0.56%
Independent Democrat	0.56%

=== Maps ===
Special elections held in 1860

Seats elected in 1860

Seats elected in 1861

Special elections held in 1861

Winner's share of the popular vote

Free state and slave state districts in the 37th Congress

== Special elections ==
There were special elections in 1860–61 during the 36th United States Congress and 37th United States Congress.

=== 36th Congress ===
District	Incumbent			This race	
District	Member	Party	First elected	Results	Candidates
Missouri 1	Francis P. Blair Jr.	Republican	1856 (Note: Blair lost the 1858 election for this seat to Barret, but successfully contested Barret's election and was seated on June 8, 1860.)	Incumbent resigned June 25, 1860. New member elected October 3, 1860. Democratic gain.	▌ ✓ John R. Barret (Democratic) 50.27%; ▌Francis P. Blair Jr. (Republican) 49.70%; ▌Albert Todd (American) 0.02%
Pennsylvania 8	John Schwartz	Anti-Lecompton; Democratic	1858	Incumbent died June 20, 1860. New member elected October 9, 1860. Democratic gain.	▌ ✓ Jacob K. McKenty (Democratic) 56.19%; ▌James McKnight (Republican) 43.81%
Maine 5	Israel Washburn Jr.	Republican	1850	Incumbent resigned January 1, 1861. New member elected November 6, 1860. Republican hold.	▌ ✓ Stephen Coburn (Republican) 65.86%; ▌Joseph D. Brown (Democratic) 14.47%; ▌Joseph Chase (Breckinridge Democratic) 14.92%; Others: ▌Abner Coburn (Unknown) 0.86%; ▌Ebenezer Hutchinson (Constitutional Union) 0.57%; ▌Samuel Blake (Unknown) 0.32%
New York 31	Silas M. Burroughs	Republican	1856	Incumbent died June 3, 1860. New member elected November 6, 1860. Republican hold.	▌ ✓ Edwin R. Reynolds (Republican) 59.02%; ▌Linus J. Peck (Democratic) 39.09%; ▌James L. Bowen (Breckinridge Democratic) 1.89%

=== 37th Congress ===
District	Incumbent			This race	
District	Member	Party	First elected	Results	Candidates
Ohio 7	Thomas Corwin	Republican	1858	Incumbent resigned March 12, 1861. New member elected May 28, 1861. Union gain.	▌ ✓ Richard A. Harrison (Union) 52.65%; ▌Aaron Harlan (Democratic) 47.35%
Ohio 13	John Sherman	Republican	1854	Incumbent resigned March 12, 1861. New member elected May 28, 1861. Republican hold.	▌ ✓ Samuel T. Worcester (Republican) 55.85%; ▌William McLaughlin (Democratic) 44.15%
Massachusetts 3	Charles F. Adams Sr.	Republican	1858	Incumbent resigned May 1, 1861. New member elected June 11, 1861. Union gain.	▌ ✓ Benjamin Thomas (Union) 90.80%; ▌Eleazar Beal (Democratic) 9.2%
Pennsylvania 12	George W. Scranton	Republican	1858	Incumbent died March 24, 1861. New member elected June 21, 1861. Democratic gain.	▌ ✓ Hendrick B. Wright (D; P) 67.82%; ▌David R. Randall (Independent (Note: Randall, a Peace Democrat, ran as an independent candidate against Wright, a War Democrat nominated by both the Democratic and People's district conventions.)) 32.18%
Pennsylvania 2	Edward Joy Morris	Republican	1856	Incumbent resigned June 8, 1861. New member elected July 2, 1861. Democratic gain.	▌ ✓ Charles J. Biddle (Democratic) 51.59%; ▌Charles O'Neill (People's) 48.41%
Iowa 1	Samuel Curtis	Republican	1856	Incumbent resigned August 4, 1861. New member elected October 8, 1861. Republican hold.	▌ ✓ James F. Wilson (Republican) 56.66%; ▌Jairus Edward Neal (Democratic) 40.94%; Scattering 2.40%
Virginia 11	John S. Carlile	Union	1859	Incumbent resigned July 9, 1861. New member elected October 24, 1861. Union hold.	▌ ✓ Jacob B. Blair (Union); ▌Frost (Unknown); ▌Haywood (Unknown); Incomplete data
Massachusetts 5	William Appleton	Constitutional; Union	1850; 1854 (lost); 1860	Incumbent resigned September 27, 1861. New member elected November 5, 1861. Republican gain.	▌ ✓ Samuel Hooper (Republican) 56.14%; ▌George B. Upton (Democratic) 43.86%
Illinois 6	John A. McClernand	Democratic	1859 (special)	Incumbent resigned October 28, 1861. New member elected December 12, 1861. Democratic hold.	▌ ✓ Anthony L. Knapp (Democratic) 97.92%; Scattering 2.08%
Missouri 3	John Bullock Clark	Democratic	1856	Incumbent expelled July 13, 1861. New member elected December 30, 1861. Democratic hold.	▌ ✓ William A. Hall (Democratic) 96.79%; ▌ M. C. Hawkins (Unknown) 2.29%; Scattering 0.91%

== Alabama ==
Alabama did not hold elections in 1860 or 1861, due to secession.

District	Incumbent			This race	
District	Member	Party	First elected	Results	Candidates
Alabama 1	James Stallworth	Democratic	1857	No election. Democratic loss.	None.
Alabama 2	James L. Pugh	Democratic	1859	No election. Democratic loss.	None.
Alabama 3	David Clopton	Democratic	1859	No election. Democratic loss.	None.
Alabama 4	Sydenham Moore	Democratic	1857	No election. Democratic loss.	None.
Alabama 5	George S. Houston	Democratic	1851	No election. Democratic loss.	None.
Alabama 6	Williamson Cobb	Democratic	1847	No election. Democratic loss.	None.
Alabama 7	Jabez L. M. Curry	Democratic	1857	No election. Democratic loss.	None.

== Arkansas ==
Arkansas held elections on August 6, 1860, but seceded before the winners could tale their seats

District	Incumbent			This race	
District	Member	Party	First elected	Results	Candidates
Arkansas 1	Thomas C. Hindman	Democratic	1858	Incumbent re-elected.	▌ ✓ Thomas C. Hindman (Democratic) 67.40%; ▌Jesse N. Cypert (Independent) 32.60%
Arkansas 2	Albert Rust	Democratic	1858	Incumbent retired. Independent gain.	▌ ✓ Edward W. Gantt (Independent) 54.38%; ▌Charles B. Mitchel (Democratic) 42.69%; ▌James A. Jones (Independent) 2.92%

== California ==
California held elections on September 4, 1861, after the beginning of Congress. Voters chose three representatives, one more than the state was allocated under the 1850 United States census. Frederick Low, the third-place finisher, was not seated until June 3, 1862, following reapportionment.

District	Incumbent			This race	
District	Member	Party	First elected	Results	Candidates (Note: Each voter voted for three candidates, who were elected at-large on a general ticket. Dubin calculates the percentage for each candidate out of the total number of ballots cast.)
California at-large	John C. Burch	Lecompton; Democratic	1859	Incumbent retired. Republican gain.	▌ ✓ Timothy G. Phelps (Republican) 48.10%; ▌ ✓ Aaron A. Sargent (Republican) 47.21%; ▌ ✓ Frederick Low (Republican) 36.37%; ▌Henry Edgerton (War Democratic) 33.01%; ▌Joseph C. McKibben (War Democratic) 32.97%; ▌Frank Ganahl (Breckinridge Democratic) 29.53%; ▌Henry P. Barber (Breckinridge Democratic) 29.42%; ▌D. O. Shattuck (Breckinridge Democratic) 22.38%; ▌John R. Gitchell (War Democratic) 21.00%
California at-large	Charles L. Scott	Lecompton; Democratic	1856	Incumbent retired. Republican gain.	▌ ✓ Timothy G. Phelps (Republican) 48.10%; ▌ ✓ Aaron A. Sargent (Republican) 47.21%; ▌ ✓ Frederick Low (Republican) 36.37%; ▌Henry Edgerton (War Democratic) 33.01%; ▌Joseph C. McKibben (War Democratic) 32.97%; ▌Frank Ganahl (Breckinridge Democratic) 29.53%; ▌Henry P. Barber (Breckinridge Democratic) 29.42%; ▌D. O. Shattuck (Breckinridge Democratic) 22.38%; ▌John R. Gitchell (War Democratic) 21.00%
California at-large	None (new seat)			New seat. Republican gain.	▌ ✓ Timothy G. Phelps (Republican) 48.10%; ▌ ✓ Aaron A. Sargent (Republican) 47.21%; ▌ ✓ Frederick Low (Republican) 36.37%; ▌Henry Edgerton (War Democratic) 33.01%; ▌Joseph C. McKibben (War Democratic) 32.97%; ▌Frank Ganahl (Breckinridge Democratic) 29.53%; ▌Henry P. Barber (Breckinridge Democratic) 29.42%; ▌D. O. Shattuck (Breckinridge Democratic) 22.38%; ▌John R. Gitchell (War Democratic) 21.00%

== Colorado Territory ==
See non-voting delegates, below.

== Connecticut ==
Connecticut held elections on April 1, 1861, after the new term began but before Congress convened.

District	Incumbent			This race	
District	Member	Party	First elected	Results	Candidates (Note: Dubin lists the Republican candidates as Unionists, but the Connecticut Union Party did not organize until the fall of 1861, after these elections.)
Connecticut 1	Dwight Loomis	Republican	1859	Incumbent re-elected.	▌ ✓ Dwight Loomis (Republican) 50.35%; ▌Alvan P. Hyde (Democratic) 49.65%
Connecticut 2	John Woodruff	Republican	1859	Incumbent lost re-election. Democratic gain.	▌ ✓ James E. English (Democratic) 52.29%; ▌John Woodruff (Republican) 47.71%
Connecticut 3	Alfred A. Burnham	Republican	1859	Incumbent re-elected.	▌ ✓ Alfred A. Burnham (Republican) 57.25%; ▌Rufus L. Baker (Democratic) 42.75%
Connecticut 4	Orris S. Ferry	Republican	1859	Incumbent lost re-election. Democratic gain.	▌ ✓ George C. Woodruff (Democratic) 50.18%; ▌Orris S. Ferry (Republican) 49.82%

== Dakota Territory ==
See non-voting delegates, below.

== Delaware ==
Delaware held elections on November 6, 1860 Election Day.

District	Incumbent			This race	
District	Member	Party	First elected	Results	Candidates
Delaware at-large	William G. Whiteley	Democratic	1856	Incumbent retired. People's gain.	▌ ✓ George P. Fisher (People's) 48.39%; ▌Benjamin T. Biggs (Breckinridge Democratic) 46.85%; ▌Elias Reed (Douglas Democratic) 4.76%

== Florida ==
Florida held elections on October 1, 1860, but seceded before the winner could take their seat.

District	Incumbent			This race	
District	Member	Party	First elected	Results	Candidates
Florida at-large	George S. Hawkins	Democratic	1856	Incumbent retired. Democratic hold.	▌ ✓ Robert Benjamin Hilton (Democratic) 59.89%; ▌B. F. Allen (Opposition) 40.11%

== Georgia ==
Georgia did not hold elections in 1860 or 1861, following secession.

District	Incumbent			This race	
District	Member	Party	First elected	Results	Candidates
Georgia 1	Peter E. Love	Democratic	1859	No election. Democratic loss.	None.
Georgia 2	Martin J. Crawford	Democratic	1855	No election. Democratic loss.	None.
Georgia 3	Thomas Hardeman Jr.	Opposition	1859	No election. Opposition loss.	None.
Georgia 4	Lucius J. Gartrell	Democratic	1857	No election. Democratic loss.	None.
Georgia 5	John W. H. Underwood	Democratic	1859	No election. Democratic loss.	None.
Georgia 6	James Jackson	Democratic	1857	No election. Democratic loss.	None.
Georgia 7	Joshua Hill	Know Nothing	1857	No election. Know Nothing loss.	None.
Georgia 8	John J. Jones	Democratic	1857	No election. Democratic loss.	None.

== Illinois ==
Illinois held elections on November 6, 1860.

District	Incumbent			This race	
District	Member	Party	First elected	Results	Candidates
Illinois 1	Elihu B. Washburne	Republican	1852	Incumbent re-elected.	▌ ✓ Elihu B. Washburne (Republican) 70.59%; ▌Theodore A. C. Beard (Democratic) 29.41%
Illinois 2	John F. Farnsworth	Republican	1856	Incumbent retired. Republican hold.	▌ ✓ Isaac N. Arnold (Republican) 64.53%; ▌Augustus N. Herrington (Democratic) 35.47%
Illinois 3	Owen Lovejoy	Republican	1856	Incumbent re-elected.	▌ ✓ Owen Lovejoy (Republican) 61.1%; ▌Robert N. Murray (Democratic) 38.9%
Illinois 4	William Kellogg	Republican	1856	Incumbent re-elected.	▌ ✓ William Kellogg (Republican) 54.65%; ▌Robert G. Ingersoll (Democratic) 45.35%
Illinois 5	Isaac N. Morris	Democratic	1856	Incumbent retired. Democratic hold.	▌ ✓ William A. Richardson (Democratic) 53.58%; ▌Benjamin M. Prentiss (Republican) 46.42%
Illinois 6	John A. McClernand	Democratic	1859 (special)	Incumbent re-elected.	▌ ✓ John A. McClernand (Democratic) 56.62%; ▌Henry Case (Republican) 43.38%
Illinois 7	James C. Robinson	Democratic	1858	Incumbent re-elected.	▌ ✓ James C. Robinson (Democratic) 54.07%; ▌James T. Cunningham (Republican) 45.93%
Illinois 8	Philip B. Fouke	Democratic	1858	Incumbent re-elected.	▌ ✓ Philip B. Fouke (Democratic) 55.48%; ▌Joseph Gillespie (Republican) 44.52%
Illinois 9	John A. Logan	Democratic	1858	Incumbent re-elected.	▌ ✓ John A. Logan (Democratic) 79.54%; ▌David T. Linegar (Independent) 19.85%

== Indiana ==
Indiana held elections on October 9, 1860.

District	Incumbent			This race	
District	Member	Party	First elected	Results	Candidates
Indiana 1	William E. Niblack	Democratic	1857	Incumbent retired. Democratic hold.	▌ ✓ John Law (Democratic) 55.67%; ▌Lemuel Q. Debruler (Republican) 44.33%
Indiana 2	William H. English	Democratic	1858	Incumbent retired. Democratic hold.	▌ ✓ James A. Cravens (Democratic) 51.28%; ▌John S. Davis (Republican) 48.72%
Indiana 3	William M. Dunn	Republican	1858	Incumbent re-elected.	▌ ✓ William M. Dunn (Republican) 54.54%; ▌William Mitchel Daily (Democratic) 45.46%
Indiana 4	William S. Holman	Democratic	1858	Incumbent re-elected.	▌ ✓ William S. Holman (Democratic) 51.22%; ▌James L. Yater (Republican) 48.78%
Indiana 5	David Kilgore	Republican	1858	Incumbent retired. Republican hold.	▌ ✓ George W. Julian (Republican) 62.00%; ▌William A. Bickle (Democratic) 38.00%
Indiana 6	Albert G. Porter	Republican	1858	Incumbent re-elected.	▌ ✓ Albert G. Porter (Republican) 52.29%; ▌Robert L. Walpole (Democratic) 47.71%
Indiana 7	John G. Davis	Anti-Lecompton; Democratic	1858	Incumbent retired. Democratic gain.	▌ ✓ Daniel W. Voorhees (Democratic) 51.46%; ▌Thomas H. Nelson (Republican) 47.28%; ▌James A. Scott (Independent) 1.26%
Indiana 8	James Wilson	Republican	1858	Incumbent retired. Republican hold.	▌ ✓ Albert S. White (Republican) 53.67%; ▌Samuel C. Wilson (Democratic) 46.33%
Indiana 9	Schuyler Colfax	Republican	1858	Incumbent re-elected.	▌ ✓ Schuyler Colfax (Republican) 55.71%; ▌Charles W. Cathcart (Democratic) 44.29%
Indiana 10	Charles Case	Republican	1858	Incumbent retired. Republican hold.	▌ ✓ William Mitchell (Republican) 55.62%; ▌Philip M. Henkle (Democratic) 44.38%
Indiana 11	John U. Pettit	Republican	1856	Incumbent retired. Republican hold.	▌ ✓ John P. C. Shanks (Republican) 54.08%; ▌Asbury Steele (Democratic) 45.92%

== Iowa ==
Iowa held elections on October 9, 1860.

District	Incumbent			This race	
District	Member	Party	First elected	Results	Candidates
Iowa 1	Samuel R. Curtis	Republican	1856	Incumbent re-elected.	▌ ✓ Samuel R. Curtis (Republican) 52.88%; ▌C. C. Cole (Democratic) 47.12%
Iowa 2	William Vandever	Republican	1858	Incumbent re-elected.	▌ ✓ William Vandever (Republican) 57.50%; ▌Ben M. Samuels (Democratic) 42.50%

== Kansas ==
Kansas previously held elections on December 1, 1859; the winner, Martin F. Conway, was seated on January 29, 1861, following the state's admission, and continued to serve during the 37th Congress. The next election for this seat was held on November 4, 1862.

== Kentucky ==
Kentucky held elections on June 20, 1861, after the new term began but before Congress convened.

District	Incumbent			This race	
District	Member	Party	First elected	Results	Candidates
Kentucky 1	Henry C. Burnett	Democratic	1855	Incumbent re-elected as Southern Rights. (Note: Burnett, a Democrat, was nominated for re-election by the Southern Rights convention. He was the only secessionist to win a seat and was soon expelled from Congress.); Southern Rights gain.	▌ ✓ Henry C. Burnett (Southern Rights) 59.08%; ▌Lawrence S. Trimble (Union Democratic) 40.92%
Kentucky 2	Samuel Peyton	Democratic	1857	Incumbent lost renomination. Union Democratic gain.	▌ ✓ James S. Jackson (Union Democratic) 73.4%; ▌John T. Bunch (Southern Rights) 26.6%
Kentucky 3	Francis Bristow	Opposition	1854 (special); 1855 (retired); 1859	Incumbent retired. Union Democratic gain.	▌ ✓ Henry Grider (Union Democratic) 76.95%; ▌Joseph Horace Lewis (Southern Rights) 23.05%
Kentucky 4	William C. Anderson	Opposition	1859	Incumbent retired. Union Democratic gain.	▌ ✓ Aaron Harding (Union Democratic) 80.72%; ▌Albert G. Talbott (Southern Rights) 19.28%
Kentucky 5	John Y. Brown	Democratic	1859	Incumbent retired. Union Democratic gain.	▌ ✓ Charles A. Wickliffe (Union Democratic) 75.14%; ▌H. E. Read (Southern Rights) 24.86%
Kentucky 6	George W. Dunlap	Opposition	1847; 1849 (retired); 1859	Incumbent re-elected as a Union Democrat. Union Democratic gain.	▌ ✓ George W. Dunlap (Union Democratic) 97.32%; ▌Alfred Smith (Southern Rights) 1.83%; Scattering 0.85
Kentucky 7	Robert Mallory	Opposition	1859	Incumbent re-elected as a Union Democrat. Union Democratic gain.	▌ ✓ Robert Mallory (Union Democratic) 79.41%; ▌Horatio Washington Bruce (Southern Rights) 20.59%
Kentucky 8	William E. Simms	Democratic	1859	Incumbent lost re-election. Union Democratic gain.	▌ ✓ John J. Crittenden (Union Democratic) 59.18%; ▌William E. Simms (Southern Rights) 40.82%
Kentucky 9	Laban T. Moore	Opposition	1859	Incumbent retired. Union Democratic gain.	▌ ✓ William H. Wadsworth (Union Democratic) 75.91%; ▌John L. Williams (Southern Rights) 24.09%
Kentucky 10	John W. Stevenson	Democratic	1857	Incumbent lost re-election. Union Democratic gain.	▌ ✓ John W. Menzies (Union Democratic) 65.18%; ▌Overton P. Hogan (Southern Rights) 29.38%; ▌Thomas L. Jones (Independent) (withdrew) 5.43%

== Louisiana ==
Louisiana did not hold elections in 1860 or 1861, following secession. Late elections were held on December 3, 1862, in two congressional districts under Union Army control; the winners were seated on February 17, 1863, 15 days before the end of their term.

District	Incumbent			This race	
District	Member	Party	First elected	Results	Candidates
Louisiana 1	John Edward Bouligny	Know Nothing	1859	No election. Know Nothing loss.	None.
Louisiana 2	Miles Taylor	Democratic	1855	No election. Democratic loss.	None.
Louisiana 3	Thomas G. Davidson	Democratic	1855	No election. Democratic loss.	None.
Louisiana 4	John M. Landrum	Democratic	1859	No election. Democratic loss.	None.

== Maine ==
Maine held elections on September 10, 1860.

District	Incumbent			This race	
District	Member	Party	First elected	Results	Candidates
Maine 1	Daniel E. Somes	Republican	1858	Incumbent retired. Republican hold.	▌ ✓ John N. Goodwin (Republican) 53.00%; ▌Thomas M. Hayes (Democratic) 46.55%; ▌Nathan Webb (Constitutional Union) 0.45%
Maine 2	John J. Perry	Republican	1854	Incumbent retired. Republican hold.	▌ ✓ Charles W. Walton (Republican) 55.68%; ▌Calvin Record (Democratic) 44.32%
Maine 3	Ezra B. French	Republican	1858	Incumbent retired. Republican hold.	▌ ✓ Samuel C. Fessenden (Republican) 52.54%; ▌Alfred W. Johnson (Democratic) 47.46%
Maine 4	Freeman H. Morse	Republican	1856	Incumbent retired. Republican hold.	▌ ✓ Anson Morrill (Republican) 61.59%; ▌Benjamin A. Fuller (Democratic) 35.24%; ▌George C. Getchell (Unknown) 1.49%; ▌Bion Bradbury (Unknown) 0.77%; ▌Freeman H. Morse (Unknown) 0.55%; Scattering 0.36
Maine 5	Israel Washburn Jr.	Republican	1850	Incumbent retired to run for Governor of Maine. Republican hold.	▌ ✓ John H. Rice (Republican) 59.76%; ▌Samuel H. Blake (Democratic) 38.74%; ▌Ebenezer Hutchinson (Constitutional Union) 1.04%; Scattering 0.47%
Maine 6	Stephen C. Foster	Republican	1856	Incumbent retired. Republican hold.	▌ ✓ Frederick A. Pike (Republican) 54.27%; ▌Bion Bradbury (Democratic) 44.72%; Scattering 1.01%

== Maryland ==
Maryland held elections on June 13, 1861, after the new term began but before Congress convened.

District	Incumbent			This race	
District	Member	Party	First elected	Results	Candidates
Maryland 1	James A. Stewart	Democratic	1855	Incumbent retired. Union gain.	▌ ✓ John W. Crisfield (Union) 57.39%; ▌Daniel McHenry (States' Rights) 42.61%
Maryland 2	Edwin H. Webster	Know; Nothing	1859	Incumbent re-elected as a Unionist. Union gain.	▌ ✓ Edwin H. Webster (Union) 98.63%; Scattering 1.37%
Maryland 3	J. Morrison Harris	Know; Nothing	1855	Incumbent retired. Union gain.	▌ ✓ Cornelius Leary (Union) 51.95%; ▌William P. Preston (States' Rights) 48.05%
Maryland 4	Henry W. Davis	Know; Nothing	1855	Incumbent lost re-election as a Unionist. Union and Peace gain.	▌ ✓ Henry May (Union and Peace) 57.55%; ▌Henry W. Davis (Union) 42.45%
Maryland 5	Jacob M. Kunkel	Democratic	1857	Incumbent retired. Union gain.	▌ ✓ Francis Thomas (Union) 96.18%; Scattering 3.82%
Maryland 6	George W. Hughes	Democratic	1859	Incumbent retired. Union gain.	▌ ✓ Charles B. Calvert (Union) 50.92%; ▌Benjamin G. Harris (States' Rights) 49.08%

== Massachusetts ==
Massachusetts held elections on November 6, 1860.

District	Incumbent			This race	
District	Member	Party	First elected	Results	Candidates
Massachusetts 1	Thomas D. Eliot	Republican	1858	Incumbent re-elected.	▌ ✓ Thomas D. Eliot (Republican) 72.52%; ▌Daniel Fisher (Constitutional Union) 10.47%; ▌Moses Bates (Democratic) 8.67%; ▌F. E. Sanford (Breckinridge Democratic) 8.34%
Massachusetts 2	James Buffington	Republican	1854	Incumbent re-elected.	▌ ✓ James Buffington (Republican) 68.40%; ▌Alexander Long (D; CU) 29.85%
Massachusetts 3	Charles Francis Adams Sr.	Republican	1858	Incumbent re-elected.	▌ ✓ Charles Francis Adams Sr. (Republican) 58.57%; ▌Leverett Saltonstall (Democratic) 41.43%
Massachusetts 4	Alexander H. Rice	Republican	1858	Incumbent re-elected.	▌ ✓ Alexander H. Rice (Republican) 52.32%; ▌Erastus B. Bigelow (D; CU; BD) 47.68%
Massachusetts 5	Anson Burlingame	Republican	1854	Incumbent lost re-election. Constitutional Union gain.	▌ ✓ William Appleton (CU; D; BD) 50.82%; ▌Anson Burlingame (Republican) 49.18%
Massachusetts 6	John B. Alley	Republican	1858	Incumbent re-elected.	▌ ✓ John B. Alley (Republican) 63.07%; ▌Otis P. Lord (Constitutional Union) 16.16%; ▌Jefferson Knight (Democratic) 14.39%; ▌George B. Loring (Breckinridge Democratic) 4.72%; Scattering 1.65%
Massachusetts 7	Daniel W. Gooch	Republican	1858	Incumbent re-elected.	▌ ✓ Daniel W. Gooch (Republican) 60.48%; ▌Charles A. Welch (D; CU) 35.79%; ▌George Johnson (Breckinridge Democratic) 3.74%
Massachusetts 8	Charles R. Train	Republican	1859	Incumbent re-elected.	▌ ✓ Charles R. Train (Republican) 64.88%; ▌Alpheus R. Brown (Democratic) 16.71%; ▌Winthrop E. Faulkner (Constitutional Union) 15.67%; ▌James C. Abbott (Breckinridge Democratic) 2.74%
Massachusetts 9	Eli Thayer	Republican	1856	Incumbent lost re-election as a Constitutional Unionist. Republican hold.	▌ ✓ Goldsmith Bailey (Republican) 54.74%; ▌Eli Thayer (Constitutional Union) 44.65%; ▌S. W. Stevens (Breckinridge Democratic) 0.61%
Massachusetts 10	Charles Delano	Republican	1858	Incumbent re-elected.	▌ ✓ Charles Delano (Republican) 75.39%; ▌Josiah Allis (Democratic) 19.02%; ▌Benning Leavitt (Breckenridge Democratic) 5.6%
Massachusetts 11	Henry L. Dawes	Republican	1856	Incumbent re-elected.	▌ ✓ Henry L. Dawes (Republican) 67.71%; ▌Norman T. Leonard (Democratic) 28.60%; ▌John M. Cole (Breckinridge Democratic) 3.69%

== Michigan ==
Michigan its members on the November 6, 1860 Election Day.

District	Incumbent			This race	
District	Member	Party	First elected	Results	Candidates
Michigan 1	William A. Howard	Republican	1854	Incumbent retired. Republican hold.	▌ ✓ Bradley F. Granger (Republican) 52.51%; ▌George V. Lathrop (Democratic) 47.03%; ▌John Conely (Unknown) 0.45%
Michigan 2	Henry Waldron	Republican	1854	Incumbent retired. Republican hold.	▌ ✓ Fernando C. Beaman (Republican) 60.16%; ▌Salathiel C. Coffenberry (Democratic) 39.84%
Michigan 3	Francis W. Kellogg	Republican	1858	Incumbent re-elected.	▌ ✓ Francis W. Kellogg (Republican) 59.04%; ▌Thomas B. Church (Democratic) 40.59%; ▌John Bell (Unknown) 0.37%
Michigan 4	Dewitt C. Leach	Republican	1858	Incumbent retired. Republican hold.	▌ ✓ Rowland E. Trowbridge (Republican) 55.79%; ▌Edward Thompson (Democratic) 44.21%

== Minnesota ==
Minnesota held elections on November 6, 1860.

District	Incumbent			This race	
District	Member	Party	First elected	Results	Candidates (Note: Each voter selected two candidates, who were elected at-large on a general ticket. Dubin calculates the percentage for each candidate out of the total number of ballots cast.)
Minnesota at-large	Cyrus Aldrich	Republican	1858	Incumbent re-elected.	▌ ✓ Cyrus Aldrich (Republican) 63.49%; ▌ ✓ William Windom (Republican) 63.02%; ▌John M. Gilman (Democratic) 34.59%; ▌James George (Democratic) 34.47%; ▌Alonzo Jay Edgerton (Breckinridge Democratic) 2.24%; ▌James W. Taylor (Breckinridge Democratic) 2.19%
Minnesota at-large	William Windom	Republican	1858	Incumbent re-elected.	▌ ✓ Cyrus Aldrich (Republican) 63.49%; ▌ ✓ William Windom (Republican) 63.02%; ▌John M. Gilman (Democratic) 34.59%; ▌James George (Democratic) 34.47%; ▌Alonzo Jay Edgerton (Breckinridge Democratic) 2.24%; ▌James W. Taylor (Breckinridge Democratic) 2.19%

== Mississippi ==
Mississippi seceded on January 9, 1861, and did not hold elections for the 37th Congress.

District	Incumbent			This race	
District	Member	Party	First elected	Results	Candidates
Mississippi 1	Lucius Q. C. Lamar	Democratic	1857	No election. Democratic loss.	None.
Mississippi 2	Reuben Davis	Democratic	1857	No election. Democratic loss.	None.
Mississippi 3	William Barksdale	Democratic	1855	No election. Democratic loss.	None.
Mississippi 4	Otho R. Singleton	Democratic	1857	No election. Democratic loss.	None.
Mississippi 5	John J. McRae	Democratic	1858 (special)	No election. Democratic loss.	None.

== Missouri ==
Missouri held elections on September 10, 1860.

District	Incumbent			This race	
District	Member	Party	First elected	Results	Candidates
Missouri 1	Francis P. Blair Jr.	Republican	1856	Incumbent re-elected.	▌ ✓ Francis Preston Blair Jr. (Republican) 44.11%; ▌John R. Barret (Democratic) 38.39%; ▌Albert Todd (Constitutional Union) 17.49%
Missouri 2	Thomas L. Anderson	Independent; Democratic	1856	Incumbent retired. Constitutional Union gain.	▌ ✓ James S. Rollins (Constitutional Union) 50.57%; ▌John B. Henderson (Democratic) 49.43%
Missouri 3	John Bullock Clark	Democratic	1856	Incumbent re-elected.	▌ ✓ John Bullock Clark (Democratic) 59.53%; ▌M. C. Hawkins (Constitutional Union) 40.47%
Missouri 4	James Craig	Democratic	1856	Incumbent lost renomination. Democratic hold	▌ ✓ Elijah Hise Norton (Democratic) 62.30%; ▌John Scott (Constitutional Union) 37.70%
Missouri 5	Samuel H. Woodson	Know; Nothing	1856	Incumbent retired. Democratic gain.	▌ ✓ John William Reid (Democratic) 52.82%; ▌F. T. Mitchell (Constitutional Union) 47.18%
Missouri 6	John S. Phelps	Democratic	1844	Incumbent re-elected.	▌ ✓ John S. Phelps (Democratic) 48.92%; ▌J. S. Rains (Constitutional Union) 40.19%; ▌William C. Price (Democratic) 10.89%
Missouri 7	John W. Noell	Democratic	1858	Incumbent re-elected.	▌ ✓ John W. Noell (Democratic) 73.45%; ▌David E. Perryman (Constitutional Union) 26.55%

== Nebraska Territory ==
See non-voting delegates, below.

== Nevada Territory ==
See non-voting delegates, below.

== New Hampshire ==
New Hampshire held elections on March 12, 1861, after the term began but before Congress convened.

District	Incumbent			This race	
District	Member	Party	First elected	Results	Candidates
New Hampshire 1	Gilman Marston	Republican	1859	Incumbent re-elected.	▌ ✓ Gilman Marston (Republican) 52.86%; ▌Daniel Marcy (Democratic) 47.14%
New Hampshire 2	Mason Tappan	Republican	1855	Incumbent retired. Republican hold.	▌ ✓ Edward H. Rollins (Republican) 52.36; ▌Samuel N. Bell (Democratic) 47.64%
New Hampshire 3	Thomas M. Edwards	Republican	1859	Incumbent re-elected.	▌ ✓ Thomas M. Edwards (Republican) 54.23%; ▌William Burns (Democratic) 45.77%

== New Jersey ==
New Jersey held elections on the November 6, 1860, Election Day.

District	Incumbent			This race	
District	Member	Party	First elected	Results	Candidates
New Jersey 1	John T. Nixon	Republican	1858	Incumbent re-elected.	▌ ✓ John T. Nixon (Republican) 50.95%; ▌Joseph F. Learning (Democratic) 49.05%
New Jersey 2	John L. N. Stratton	Republican	1858	Incumbent re-elected.	▌ ✓ John L. N. Stratton (Republican) 52.77%; ▌Augustus Green (Democratic) 47.23%
New Jersey 3	Garnett Adrain	Anti-Lecompton; Democratic	1856	Incumbent retired. Democratic gain.	▌ ✓ William G. Steele (Democratic) 55.17%; ▌Alexander Berthoud (Republican) 44.83%
New Jersey 4	Jetur R. Riggs	Anti-Lecompton; Democratic	1858	Incumbent retired. Democratic gain.	▌ ✓ George T. Cobb (Democratic) 52.63%; ▌Benjamin Edsell (Republican) 47.37%
New Jersey 5	William Pennington	Republican	1858	Incumbent lost re-election. Democratic gain.	▌ ✓ Nehemiah Perry (Democratic) 50.63%; ▌William Pennington (Republican) 49.37%

== New Mexico Territory ==
See non-voting delegates, below.

== New York ==
New York its members on the November 6, 1860.

District	Incumbent			This race	
District	Member	Party	First elected	Results	Candidates
New York 1	Luther C. Carter	Republican	1858	Incumbent lost re-election. Democratic gain.	▌ ✓ Edward H. Smith (Democratic) 52.78%; ▌Luther C. Carter (Republican) 47.22%
New York 2	James Humphrey	Republican	1858	Incumbent lost re-election. Democratic gain.	▌ ✓ Moses F. Odell (Democratic) 55.07%; ▌James Humphrey (Republican) 44.93%
New York 3	Daniel Sickles	Democratic	1856	Incumbent retired. Democratic hold.	▌ ✓ Benjamin Wood (Democratic) 52.83%; ▌Amer J. Williamson (Republican) 41.11%; ▌John Y. Savage (Independent Democrat) 6.05%
New York 4	Thomas J. Barr	Independent; Democratic	1858	Incumbent retired. Independent Democratic hold.	▌ ✓ James Kerrigan (Independent Democrat) 41.30%; ▌Michael Tuomy (Democratic) 32.02%; ▌John Commerford (Republican) 26.68%
New York 5	William B. Maclay	Democratic	1856	Incumbent retired. Republican gain.	▌ ✓ William Wall (Republican) 41.00%; ▌Nelson Taylor (Democratic) 40.61%; ▌John Duffy (Independent Democrat) 18.39%
New York 6	John Cochrane	Democratic	1856	Incumbent lost renomination. Republican gain.	▌ ✓ Frederick A. Conkling (Republican) 35.10%; ▌John Cochrane (Independent Democrat) 34.16%; ▌John W. Chanler (Democratic) 30.74%
New York 7	George Briggs	Republican	1858	Incumbent retired. Democratic gain.	▌ ✓ Elijah Ward (Democratic) 56.23%; ▌Augustus F. Dow (Republican) 43.77%
New York 8	Horace F. Clark	Anti-Lecompton; Democratic	1856	Incumbent retired. Democratic gain.	▌ ✓ Isaac C. Delaplaine (Democratic) 59.04%; ▌Abram Wakeman (Republican) 40.96%
New York 9	John B. Haskin	Anti-Lecompton; Democratic	1856	Incumbent retired. 'Democratic gain.	▌ ✓ Edward Haight (Democratic) 53.54%; ▌Thomas Nelson (Republican) 46.46%
New York 10	Charles Van Wyck	Republican	1858	Incumbent re-elected.	▌ ✓ Charles Van Wyck (Republican) 50.45%; ▌Daniel B. St. John (Democratic) 49.55%
New York 11	William S. Kenyon	Republican	1858	Incumbent retired. Democratic gain.	▌ ✓ John B. Steele (Democratic) 50.38%; ▌Peter H. Silvester (Republican) 49.62%
New York 12	Charles Lewis Beale	Republican	1858	Incumbent retired. Republican hold.	▌ ✓ Stephen Baker (Republican) 51.99%; ▌Ambrose Wager (Democratic) 46.34%; ▌John H. Overheister (Breckinridge Democratic) 1.67%
New York 13	Abram B. Olin	Republican	1856	Incumbent re-elected.	▌ ✓ Abram B. Olin (Republican) 51.13%; ▌Issac McConihe (Democratic) 48.87%
New York 14	John H. Reynolds	Anti-Lecompton; Democratic	1858	Incumbent retired. Democratic gain.	▌ ✓ Erastus Corning (Democratic) 51.85%; ▌Thomas W. Olcott (Republican) 48.15%
New York 15	James B. McKean	Republican	1858	Incumbent re-elected.	▌ ✓ James B. McKean (Republican) 58.76%; ▌Emerson E. Davis (Democratic) 41.24%
New York 16	George W. Palmer	Republican	1856	Incumbent retired. Republican hold.	▌ ✓ William A. Wheeler (Republican) 58.73%; ▌Augustus C. Hand (Democratic) 41.27%
New York 17	Francis E. Spinner	Republican	1854	Incumbent retired. Republican hold.	▌ ✓ Socrates N. Sherman (Republican) 68.39%; ▌Henry G. Foote (Democratic) 31.61%
New York 18	Clark B. Cochrane	Republican	1856	Incumbent retired. Democratic gain.	▌ ✓ Chauncey Vibbard (Democratic) 50.88%; ▌Simon H. Mix (Republican) 49.12%
New York 19	James H. Graham	Republican	1858	Incumbent retired. Republican hold.	▌ ✓ Richard Franchot (Republican) 56.97%; ▌Lyman J. Walworth (Democratic) 43.03%
New York 20	Roscoe Conkling	Republican	1858	Incumbent re-elected.	▌ ✓ Roscoe Conkling (Republican) 58.28%; ▌De Witt C. Grover (Democratic) 41.72%
New York 21	R. Holland Duell	Republican	1858	Incumbent re-elected.	▌ ✓ R. Holland Duell (Republican) 62.21%; ▌Simon C. Hitchcock (Democratic) 21.94%; ▌Judson C. Nelson (Breckinridge Democratic) 15.86%
New York 22	M. Lindley Lee	Republican	1858	Incumbent retired. Republican hold.	▌ ✓ William E. Lansing (Republican) 63.73%; ▌B. Franklin Chapman (Democratic) 36.27%
New York 23	Charles B. Hoard	Republican	1856	Incumbent retired. Republican hold.	▌ ✓ Ambrose W. Clark (Republican) 59.90%; ▌James F. Starbuck (Democratic) 38.2%; ▌George C. Sherman (Breckinridge Democratic) 1.90%
New York 24	Charles B. Sedgwick	Republican	1858	Incumbent re-elected.	▌ ✓ Charles B. Sedgwick (Republican) 60.42%; ▌Lake Tefft (Democratic) 32.92%; ▌Luther Hay (Breckinridge Democratic) 6.67%
New York 25	Martin Butterfield	Republican	1858	Incumbent retired. Republican hold.	▌ ✓ Theodore M. Pomeroy (Republican) 64.46%; ▌William C. Beardsley (Democratic) 35.54%
New York 26	Emory B. Pottle	Republican	1856	Incumbent retired. Republican hold.	▌ ✓ Jacob P. Chamberlain (Republican) 58.26%; ▌John L. Lewis (Democratic) 41.02%; ▌George N. Clark (Independent) 0.72%
New York 27	Alfred Wells	Republican	1858	Incumbent retired. Republican hold.	▌ ✓ Alexander S. Diven (Republican) 57.20%; ▌Harvey A. Dowe (Democratic) 42.80%
New York 28	William Irvine	Republican	1858	Incumbent retired. Republican hold.	▌ ✓ Robert B. Van Valkenburgh (Republican) 60.75%; ▌Charles C. Walker (Democratic) 39.25%
New York 29	Alfred Ely	Republican	1858	Incumbent re-elected.	▌ ✓ Alfred Ely (Republican) 59.41%; ▌Mortimer F. Reynolds (Democratic) 40.59%
New York 30	Augustus Frank	Republican	1858	Incumbent re-elected.	▌ ✓ Augustus Frank (Republican) 67.49%; ▌Martin F. Robinson (Democratic) 32.51%
New York 31	Vacant (Note: Incumbent Republican Silas M. Burroughs died prior to the election.)			Incumbent retired. Republican hold.	▌ ✓ Burt Van Horn (Republican) 58.81%; ▌Phineas L. Ely (Democratic) 39.94%; ▌Jonathan L. Woods (Breckinridge Democratic) 1.26%
New York 32	Elbridge G. Spaulding	Republican	1858	Incumbent re-elected.	▌ ✓ Elbridge G. Spaulding (Republican) 52.82%; ▌Solomon G. Haven (Democratic) 47.18%
New York 33	Reuben Fenton	Republican	1856	Incumbent re-elected.	▌ ✓ Reuben Fenton (Republican) 66.79%; ▌Charles H. Lee (Democratic) 33.21%

== North Carolina ==
North Carolina seceded on May 20, 1861, and did not hold elections for the 37th Congress.

District	Incumbent			This race	
District	Member	Party	First elected	Results	Candidates
North Carolina 1	William N. H. Smith	Opposition	1859	No election. Opposition loss.	None.
North Carolina 2	Thomas H. Ruffin	Democratic	1853	No election. Democratic loss.	None.
North Carolina 3	Warren Winslow	Democratic	1855	No election. Democratic loss.	None.
North Carolina 4	Lawrence O'Bryan Branch	Democratic	1855	No election. Democratic loss.	None.
North Carolina 5	John A. Gilmer	Opposition	1857	No election. Opposition loss.	None.
North Carolina 6	James M. Leach	Opposition	1859	No election. Opposition loss.	None.
North Carolina 7	F. Burton Craige	Democratic	1853	No election. Democratic loss.	None.
North Carolina 8	Zebulon Vance	Democratic	1858 (Special)	No election. Democratic loss.	None.

== Ohio ==
District	Incumbent			This race	
District	Member	Party	First elected	Results	Candidates
Ohio 1	George H. Pendleton	Democratic	1856	Incumbent re-elected.	▌ ✓ George H. Pendleton (Democratic) 48.87%; ▌Oliver M. Spencer (Republican) 42.97%; ▌A. E. Jones (Constitutional Union) 8.16%
Ohio 2	John A. Gurley	Republican	1858	Incumbent re-elected.	▌ ✓ John A. Gurley (Republican) 48.09%; ▌Alexander Long (Democratic) 43.08%; ▌John Scott Harrison (Constitutional Union) 8.83%
Ohio 3	Clement Vallandigham	Democratic	1858 (Won contest)	Incumbent re-elected.	▌ ✓ Clement Vallandigham (Democratic) 50.16%; ▌Samuel Craighead (Republican) 49.55%; ▌Andrew McClary (Unknown) 0.29%
Ohio 4	William Allen	Democratic	1858	Incumbent re-elected.	▌ ✓ William Allen (Democratic) 51.73%; ▌James Hart (Republican) 48.27%
Ohio 5	James M. Ashley	Republican	1858	Incumbent re-elected.	▌ ✓ James M. Ashley (Republican) 52.29%; ▌James B. Steedman (Democratic) 47.71%
Ohio 6	William Howard	Democratic	1858	Incumbent retired. Democratic hold.	▌ ✓ Chilton A. White (Democratic) 53.23%; ▌David H. Murphy (Republican) 46.77%
Ohio 7	Thomas Corwin	Republican	1858	Incumbent re-elected.	▌ ✓ Thomas Corwin (Republican) 69.95%; ▌William B. Telfair (Democratic) 20.16%; ▌William Stokes (Constitutional Union) 9.89%
Ohio 8	Benjamin Stanton	Republican	1854	Incumbent retired. Republican hold.	▌ ✓ Samuel Shellabarger (Republican) 57.55%; ▌James S. Harrison (Democratic) 41.23%; ▌Edward P. Fyffe (Constitutional Union) 1.22%
Ohio 9	John Carey	Republican	1858	Incumbent lost re-election. Democratic gain.	▌ ✓ Warren P. Noble (Democratic) 51.12%; ▌John Carey (Republican) 48.88%
Ohio 10	Carey A. Trimble	Republican	1858	Incumbent re-elected.	▌ ✓ Carey Trimble (Republican) 51.26%; ▌Wells A. Hutchins (Democratic) 48.74%
Ohio 11	Charles D. Martin	Democratic	1858	Incumbent lost re-election. Republican gain.	▌ ✓ Valentine B. Horton (Republican) 51.49%; ▌Charles D. Martin (Democratic) 48.52%
Ohio 12	Samuel S. Cox	Democratic	1856	Incumbent re-elected.	▌ ✓ Samuel S. Cox (Democratic) 51.69%; ▌Samuel Galloway (Republican) 47.54%; ▌Thomas Sparrow (Unknown) 0.77%
Ohio 13	John Sherman	Republican	1854	Incumbent re-elected.	▌ ✓ John Sherman (Republican) 57.16%; ▌Barnabas Burns (Democratic) 42.84%
Ohio 14	Harrison G. O. Blake	Republican	(Special)	Incumbent re-elected.	▌ ✓ Harrison G. O. Blake (Republican) 57.08%; ▌Charles D. Prentiss (Democratic) 42.92%
Ohio 15	William Helmick	Republican	1858	Incumbent lost re-election. Democratic gain.	▌ ✓ Robert H. Nugen (Democratic) 52.13%; ▌William Helmick (Republican) 47.87%
Ohio 16	Cydnor B. Tompkins	Republican	1856	Incumbent lost renomination. Republican hold.	▌ ✓ William P. Cutler (Republican) 50.19%; ▌Hugh J. Jewett (Democratic) 49.81%
Ohio 17	Thomas C. Theaker	Republican	1858	Incumbent lost re-election. Democratic gain.	▌ ✓ James R. Morris (Democratic) 51.00%; ▌Thomas C. Theaker (Republican) 45.17%; ▌M. J. Glover (Constitutional Union) 3.83%
Ohio 18	Sidney Edgerton	Republican	1858	Incumbent re-elected.	▌ ✓ Sidney Edgerton (Republican) 58.29%; ▌David A. Starkweather (Democratic) 41.71%
Ohio 19	Edward Wade	Republican	1852	Incumbent retired. Republican hold.	▌ ✓ Albert G. Riddle (Republican) 69.06%; ▌Andrew J. Williams (Democratic) 30.94%
Ohio 20	John Hutchins	Republican	1858	Incumbent re-elected.	▌ ✓ John Hutchins (Republican) 71.97%; ▌David M. Wilson (Democratic) 28.03%
Ohio 21	John A. Bingham	Republican	1854	Incumbent re-elected.	▌ ✓ John A. Bingham (Republican) 61.17%; ▌George Wells (Democratic) 33.71%; ▌J. S. Blakely (Unknown) 5.12%

== Oregon ==
Oregon held two elections in 1860 due to confusion about the legal date of the election. George K. Shiel won the election held on June 4, 1860, while Andrew J. Thayer won the election held on November 6. Thayer was seated March 4, 1861, but Shiel contested the election; on July 30, 1861, the United States House Committee on Elections seated the Shiel for the remainder of the term ending March 3, 1863.

District	Incumbent			This race	
District	Member	Party	First elected	Results	Candidates
Oregon at-large	Lansing Stout	Democratic	1858	Incumbent lost renomination. Democratic hold.	▌ ✓ George Shiel (Democratic) 50.29%; ▌David Logan (Republican) 49.71%
Oregon at-large	Lansing Stout	Democratic	1858	Incumbent lost renomination. Democratic hold. Winner later unseated.	▌ ✓ Andrew J. Thayer (Democratic) 96.44%; ▌George Shiel (Democratic) 3.08%; ▌John S. Smith (Unknown) 0.47%

== Pennsylvania ==
Pennsylvania held elections on October 9, 1860.

District	Incumbent			This race	
District	Member	Party	First elected	Results	Candidates (Note: The Pennsylvania affiliate of the Republican Party was called the People's Party at the time of these elections.)
Pennsylvania 1	Thomas B. Florence	Democratic	1848	Incumbent retired. Democratic hold.	▌ ✓ William E. Lehman (Democratic) 44.98%; ▌John M. Butler (People's) 44.28%; ▌Edward King (Constitutional Union) 10.74%
Pennsylvania 2	Edward J. Morris	People's	1856	Incumbent re-elected.	▌ ✓ Edward J. Morris (People's) 46.61%; ▌John Broadhead (Democratic) 40.29%; ▌Henry M. Fuller (Constitutional Union) 13.11%
Pennsylvania 3	John P. Verree	People's	1858	Incumbent re-elected.	▌ ✓ John P. Verree (People's) 49.07%; ▌John Kline (Democratic) 48.95%; ▌Henry M. Hamilton (Constitutional Union) 1.97%
Pennsylvania 4	William Millward	People's	1858	Incumbent retired. People's hold.	▌ ✓ William D. Kelley (People's) 49.27%; ▌William Morgan (Democratic) 43.42%; ▌John B. Robinson (Constitutional Union) 7.3%
Pennsylvania 5	John Wood	People's	1858	Incumbent retired. People's hold.	▌ ✓ William M. Davis (People's) 47.90%; ▌Harry Ingersoll (Democratic) 46.48%; ▌James Rittenhouse (Constitutional Union) 5.62%
Pennsylvania 6	John Hickman	Anti-Lecompton; Democratic	1856	Incumbent re-elected as a Populist. People's gain	▌ ✓ John Hickman (People's) 55.97%; ▌John H. Brinton (Democratic) 42.51%; ▌Frazier Smith (Anti-Lecompton Democratic) 1.52%
Pennsylvania 7	Henry Clay Longnecker	People's	1858	Democratic gain	▌ ✓ Thomas Buchecker Cooper (Democratic) 50.33%; ▌Henry Clay Longnecker (People's) 49.67%
Pennsylvania 8	Vacant (Note: Incumbent Anti-Lecompton Democrat John Schwartz died prior to the election.)			Incumbent retired. Democratic gain.	▌ ✓ Sydenham E. Ancona (Democratic) 58.42%; ▌Levi B. Smith (People's) 41.58%
Pennsylvania 9	Thaddeus Stevens	People's	1858	Incumbent re-elected.	▌ ✓ Thaddeus Stevens (People's) 96.5%; Scattering 3.5%
Pennsylvania 10	John W. Killinger	People's	1858	Incumbent re-elected.	▌ ✓ John W. Killinger (People's) 62.04%; ▌James Worrell (Democratic) 37.96%
Pennsylvania 11	James H. Campbell	People's	1858	Incumbent re-elected.	▌ ✓ James H. Campbell (People's) 50.90%; ▌John Hughes (Democratic) 49.10%
Pennsylvania 12	George W. Scranton	People's	1858	Incumbent re-elected.	▌ ✓ George W. Scranton (People's) 51.53%; ▌David R. Randall (Democratic) 48.47%
Pennsylvania 13	William H. Dimmick	Democratic	1856	Incumbent retired. Democratic hold.	▌ ✓ Philip Johnson (Democratic) 57.30%; ▌David K. Shoemaker (People's) 42.70%
Pennsylvania 14	Galusha A. Grow	People's	1850	Incumbent re-elected.	▌ ✓ Galusha A. Grow (People's) 71.38%; ▌Daniel L. Serwood (Democratic) 28.62%
Pennsylvania 15	James Tracy Hale	People's	1858	Incumbent re-elected.	▌ ✓ James Tracy Hale (People's) 53.76%; ▌Robert Fleming (Democratic) 46.24%
Pennsylvania 16	Benjamin F. Junkin	People's	1858	Incumbent lost re-election. Democratic gain.	▌ ✓ Joseph Bailey (Democratic) 50.75%; ▌Benjamin F. Junkin (People's) 49.25%
Pennsylvania 17	Edward McPherson	People's	1858	Incumbent re-elected.	▌ ✓ Edward McPherson (People's) 51.23%; ▌William P Schell (Democratic) 48.77%
Pennsylvania 18	Samuel S. Blair	People's	1858	Incumbent re-elected.	▌ ✓ Samuel S. Blair (People's) 57.64%; ▌Archibald McAllister (Democratic) 42.36%
Pennsylvania 19	John Covode	People's	1854	Incumbent re-elected.	▌ ✓ John Covode (People's) 54.66%; ▌Darwin Phelps (Democratic) 45.34%
Pennsylvania 20	William Montgomery	Democratic	1856	Incumbent retired. Democratic hold.	▌ ✓ Jesse Lazear (Democratic) 52.90%; ▌Andrew Stewart (People's) 47.10%
Pennsylvania 21	James K. Moorhead	People's	1858	Incumbent re-elected.	▌ ✓ James K. Moorhead (People's) 61.31%; ▌James Kerr (Democratic) 38.69%
Pennsylvania 22	Robert McKnight	People's	1858	Incumbent re-elected.	▌ ✓ Robert McKnight (People's) 66.26%; ▌Lewis Z. Mitchell (Independent Democrat) 23.12%; ▌George Case (Democratic) 10.62%
Pennsylvania 23	William Stewart	People's	1856	Incumbent retired. People's hold.	▌ ✓ John W. Wallace (People's) 55.58%; ▌Samuel Holstein (Democratic) 44.42%
Pennsylvania 24	Chapin Hall	People's	1858	Incumbent retired. People's hold.	▌ ✓ John Patton (People's) 53.58%; ▌James K. Kerr (Democratic) 46.42%
Pennsylvania 25	Elijah Babbitt	People's	1858	Incumbent re-elected.	▌ ✓ Elijah Babbitt (People's) 65.85%; ▌Edwin C. Wilson (Democratic) 34.15%

== Rhode Island ==
Rhode Island held elections on April 3, 1861, after the new term began but before Congress convened.

District	Incumbent			This race	
District	Member	Party	First elected	Results	Candidates
Rhode Island 1	Christopher Robinson	Know Nothing	1859	Incumbent lost re-election as a Republican. Constitutional Union gain.	▌ ✓ William P. Sheffield (Constitutional Union) 51.25%; ▌Christopher Robinson (Republican) 48.75%
Rhode Island 2	William D. Brayton	Republican	1859	Incumbent lost re-election. Constitutional Union gain.	▌ ✓ George H. Browne (Constitutional Union) 53.52%; ▌William D. Brayton (Republican) 46.48%

== South Carolina ==
South Carolina held elections on October 8 and 9, 1860, but seceded on December 20, before the winners could take their seats.

District	Incumbent			This race	
District	Member	Party	First elected	Results	Candidates
South Carolina 1	John McQueen	Democratic	1844	Incumbent re-elected.	▌ ✓ John McQueen (Democratic) 96.94%; ▌Charles W. Miller (Unknown) 3.06%
South Carolina 2	William P. Miles	Democratic	1856	Incumbent re-elected.	▌ ✓ William P. Miles (Democratic) 100.00%
South Carolina 3	Laurence M. Keitt	Democratic	1853	Incumbent retired. Democratic hold.	▌ ✓ Lewis Malone Ayer Jr. (Democratic) 73.77%; ▌George P. Elliot (Unknown) 26.23%
South Carolina 4	Milledge L. Bonham	Democratic	1858	Incumbent re-elected.	▌ ✓ Milledge L. Bonham (Democratic) 100.00%
South Carolina 5	John D. Ashmore	Democratic	1858	Incumbent re-elected.	▌ ✓ John D. Ashmore (Democratic) **
South Carolina 6	William W. Boyce	Democratic	1853	Incumbent re-elected.	▌ ✓ William W. Boyce (Democratic) 100.00%

== Tennessee ==
Tennessee seceded on June 8, 1861, and held elections for the Confederate States Congress on August 1. In four districts including parts of unionist East Tennessee, the Unionist candidates pledged to serve in the United States Congress if elected. (The Confederacy seated the losing secessionist candidates from these districts.) In the 1st, 2nd, and 3rd districts, some voters marked their ballots "for U.S. Congress only;" these votes are counted separately below. Ultimately, three Tennessee Unionists were seated by the House; a fourth, Thomas A. R. Nelson, was elected but was captured by the Confederacy en route to Washington to take his seat.

District	Incumbent			This race	
District	Member	Party	First elected	Results	Candidates
Tennessee 1	Thomas A. R. Nelson	Opposition	1859	Incumbent re-elected as a Unionist. Winner captured by Confederate forces. Opposition loss.	▌ ✓ Thomas A. R. Nelson (Union) 53.86%; ▌Joseph B. Heiskell (Confederacy) 39.84% (Note: Elected to the Confederate States Congress.); ▌Caldwell (Confederacy) 4.98%; ▌William McFarland (Union) 1.32%
Tennessee 1	Thomas A. R. Nelson	Opposition	1859	Incumbent re-elected as a Unionist. Winner captured by Confederate forces. Opposition loss.	For U.S. Congress only: ▌ ✓ Thomas A. R. Nelson (Union) 90.66%; ▌William McFarland (Union) 6.67%; ▌Frederick Heiskell (Union) 2.67%
Tennessee 2	Horace Maynard	Opposition	1857	Incumbent re-elected as a Unionist. Union gain.	▌ ✓ Horace Maynard (Union) 59.23%; ▌James T. Shields (Confederacy) 40.77%
Tennessee 2	Horace Maynard	Opposition	1857	Incumbent re-elected as a Unionist. Union gain.	For U.S. Congress only: ▌ ✓ Horace Maynard (Union) **
Tennessee 3	Reese B. Brabson	Opposition	1859	Incumbent retired. Union gain.	▌ ✓ George W. Bridges (Union) 52.75%; ▌A. B. Welcker (Confederacy) 46.80%; ▌Samuel A. Smith (Unknown) 0.45%
Tennessee 3	Reese B. Brabson	Opposition	1859	Incumbent retired. Union gain.	For U.S. Congress only: ▌ ✓ George W. Bridges (Union) 100%
Tennessee 4	William B. Stokes	Opposition	1859	Incumbent retired. Union gain.	▌ ✓ A. J. Clements (Union) 100.00%
Tennessee 5	Robert H. Hatton	Opposition	1859	No election. Opposition loss.	None.
Tennessee 6	James H. Thomas	Democratic	1859	No election. Democratic loss.	None.
Tennessee 7	John V. Wright	Democratic	1855	No election. Democratic loss.	None.
Tennessee 8	James M. Quarles	Opposition	1859	No election. Opposition loss.	None.
Tennessee 9	Emerson Etheridge	Opposition	1853; 1857 (lost); 1859	No election. Opposition loss.	None.
Tennessee 10	William T. Avery	Democratic	1857	No election. Democratic loss.	None.

== Texas ==
Texas seceded on February 1, 1861, and did not hold elections for the 37th Congress.

District	Incumbent			This race	
District	Member	Party	First elected	Results	Candidates
Texas 1	John H. Reagan	Democratic	1859	No election. Democratic loss.	None.
Texas 2	Andrew J. Hamilton	Independent; Democrat	1859	No election. Independent Democratic loss.	None.

== Utah Territory ==
See non-voting delegates, below.

== Vermont ==
Vermont held elections on September 4, 1860.

District	Incumbent			This race	
District	Member	Party	First elected	Results	Candidates
Vermont 1	E. P. Walton	Republican	1856	Incumbent re-elected.	▌ ✓ E. P. Walton (Republican) 73.40%; ▌Silas Wilcox (Democratic) 24.23%; ▌U. M. Robinson (Breckinridge Democratic) 2.11%; Scattering 0.26%
Vermont 2	Justin S. Morrill	Republican	1854	Incumbent re-elected.	▌ ✓ Justin S. Morrill (Republican) 74.63%; ▌Charles N. Davenport (Democratic) 19.52%; ▌Asa M. Dickey (Breckinridge Democratic) 5.54%; Scattering 0.30%
Vermont 3	Homer E. Royce	Republican	1856	Incumbent retired. Republican hold.	▌ ✓ Portus Baxter (Republican) 71.57%; ▌Arzo D. Chaffee (Democratic) 22.25%; ▌Willis Lyman (Breckinridge Democratic) 4.92%; ▌Carlos Baxter (Note: The Vermont Watchman suggested that these votes were intended for Portus Baxter, but were erroneously given to his brother, Carlos.) (Unknown) 1.12%; Scattering 0.14%

== Virginia ==
The Restored Government of Virginia held elections in five districts on May 23 and October 24, 1861. Two elections were held in Virginia's 7th congressional district, resulting in two winners; Charles H. Upton won the May 23 election and was initially seated, but was unseated on February 27, 1862. The winners of the October 24 elections in the 1st and 7th districts were not seated, leaving the Unionists from the 10th, 11th, and 12th districts as the only Virginia representatives in the 37th Congress.

District	Incumbent			This race	
District	Member	Party	First elected	Results	Candidates
Virginia 1	Muscoe Garnett	Democratic	1856 (special)	Incumbent retired. Winner not seated. Democratic loss.	▌ ✓ Joseph Segar (Union) 100.00%
Virginia 2	John S. Millson	Democratic	1853	No election. Democratic loss.	None.
Virginia 3	Daniel Coleman DeJarnette	Independent; Democratic	1853	No election. Independent Democratic loss.	None.
Virginia 4	Roger Pryor	Democratic	1859 (special)	No election. Democratic loss.	None.
Virginia 5	Thomas S. Bocock	Democratic	1853	No election. Democratic loss.	None.
Virginia 6	Shelton F. Leake	Independent; Democratic	1859	No election. Independent Democratic loss.	None.
Virginia 7	William Smith	Democratic	1841 (special); 1843 (lost); 1857	Incumbent retired. Union gain. Winner later unseated.	First election (May 23, 1861): ▌ ✓ Charles H. Upton (Union) 100.00%
Virginia 7	William Smith	Democratic	1841 (special); 1843 (lost); 1857	Incumbent retired. Winner not seated. Democratic loss.	Second election (October 24, 1861): ▌ ✓ S. Ferguson Beach (Union) 92.62%; ▌Charles B. Shirley (Unknown) 7.38%
Virginia 8	Alexander Boteler	Opposition	1859	No election. Opposition loss.	None.
Virginia 9	John T. Harris	Independent; Democratic	1859	No election. Independent Democratic loss.	None.
Virginia 10	Sherrard Clemens	Democratic	1857	Incumbent retired. Union gain.	▌ ✓ William G. Brown Sr. (Union) 99.69%; ▌Zedekiah Kidwell (Unknown) 0.31%
Virginia 11	Albert G. Jenkins	Democratic	1857	Incumbent retired. Union gain.	▌ ✓ John S. Carlile (Union) 99.28%; ▌Albert G. Jenkins (Unknown) 0.72%
Virginia 12	Henry A. Edmundson	Democratic	1849	Incumbent retired. Union gain.	▌ ✓ Kellian Whaley (Union) **
Virginia 13	Elbert S. Martin	Independent; Democratic	1859	No election. Independent Democratic loss.	None.

== Washington Territory ==
See non-voting delegates, below.

== Wisconsin ==
Wisconsin held elections on November 6, 1860.

District	Incumbent			This race	
District	Member	Party	First elected	Results	Candidates
Wisconsin 1	John F. Potter	Republican	1856	Incumbent re-elected.	▌ ✓ John F. Potter (Republican) 54.53%; ▌Jonathan E. Arnold (Democratic) 45.47%
Wisconsin 2	Cadwallader C. Washburn	Republican	1854	Incumbent retired. Republican hold.	▌ ✓ Luther Hanchett (Republican) 61.17%; ▌James D. Reymert (Democratic) 38.83%
Wisconsin 3	Charles H. Larrabee	Democratic	1858	Incumbent lost re-election. Republican gain.	▌ ✓ A. Scott Sloan (Republican) 53.98%; ▌Charles H. Larrabee (Democratic) 46.02%

== Non-voting delegates ==
District	Incumbent			This race	
District	Delegate	Party	First elected	Results	Candidates
Colorado Territory at-large	None (new seat)			New seat. Republican gain.	▌ ✓ Hiram P. Bennet (Republican) 69.86%; ▌B. D. Williams (People's) 30.14%
Dakota Territory at-large	None (new seat)			New seat. Independent gain.	▌ ✓ J. B. S. Todd (Independent) 67.86%; ▌C. P. Booge (People's) 18.80%; ▌A. J. Bell (Union) 13.33%
Nebraska Territory at-large	Samuel Gordon Daily	Republican	1859 (Note: Daily lost the 1859 election for this seat to Experience Estabrook, but successfully contested Estabrook's election and was seated on May 18, 1860.)	Incumbent lost re-election. Democratic gain. Winner later unseated.	▌ ✓ Julius S. Morton (Democratic) 50.12%; ▌Samuel G. Daily (Republican) 49.88%
Nevada Territory	None (new seat)			New seat. Independent Union gain.	▌ ✓ John Cradlebaugh (Independent Union) 34.13%; ▌Charles E. Olney (Union) 30.11%; ▌William F. Anderson (Breckinridge Democratic) 18.62%; ▌Charles H. Bryan (Independent Union) 17.03%; Scattering 0.11%
New Mexico Territory at-large	Miguel A. Otero	Democratic	1859	Incumbent retired. Independent gain. (Note: Watts, a Republican, was nominated by a nonpartisan convention that called itself the Independent Party.)	▌ ✓ John S. Watts (Independent) 66.16%; ▌Diego Archuleta (Unknown (Note: Archuleta was nominated by a convention of unknown party affiliation. He had supported the Mexican Democratic Party during the early 1850s before switching his allegiance to the National (American) Democratic Party later in the decade.)) 33.84%
Utah Territory	William Henry Hooper	Democratic	1859	Incumbent retired. Independent gain.	▌ ✓ John M. Bernhisel (Independent) **
Washington Territory at-large	Isaac Stevens	Democratic	1857	Incumbent retired. Republican gain.	▌ ✓ William H. Wallace (Republican) 44.17%; ▌Selucius Garfielde (Democratic) 35.36%; ▌Edward M. Lander (Independent) 20.48%

== See also ==
- 1860 United States elections
  - 1860 United States presidential election
  - 1860–61 United States Senate elections
- 36th United States Congress
- 37th United States Congress

== Bibliography ==
=== Primary sources ===
- Greeley, Horace, ed. (1862). Tribune Almanac for 1862. New York.'
- Knight, William H., ed. (1862). Hand-Book Almanac for the Pacific States [...]. San Francisco.
- United States House of Representatives (1861). Evidence and Other Papers Submitted in the Contested Election of Samuel G. Daily versus J. Sterling Morton [...]. Washington, D. C.

=== Secondary sources ===
- Astor, Aaron (2012). Rebels on the Border: Civil War, Emancipation, and the Reconstruction of Kentucky and Missouri. Baton Rouge: Louisiana State University Press.
- Bradley, Erwin Stanley (1964). The Triumph of Militant Republicanism: A Study of Pennsylvania and Presidential Politics, 1860–1872. Philadelphia: University of Pennsylvania Press.
- Craig, Berry; Ullrich, Dieter C. (2016). Unconditional Unionist: The Hazardous Life of Lucian Anderson, Kentucky Congressman. Jefferson, NC: McFarland and Company.
- Dell, Christopher (1975). Lincoln and the War Democrats: The Grand Erosion of Conservative Tradition. Rutherford, NJ: Farleigh Dickenson University Press.
- Dubin, Michael J. (1998). United States Congressional Elections, 1788-1997: The Official Results of the Elections of the 1st Through 105th Congresses. Jefferson, NC: McFarland and Company. ISBN 978-0786402830.
- Foner, Eric (1995). Free Soil, Free Labor, Free Men: The Ideology of the Republican Party Before the Civil War. New York: Oxford University Press.
- Freehling, William W. (2007). The Road to Disunion. Vol. 2: Secessionists Triumphant, 1854–1861. New York: Oxford University Press.
- Gonzales, Phillip B. (2016). Politica: Nuevomexicanos and American Political Incorporation, 1821–1910. Lincoln: University of Nebraska Press.
- Isern, Thomas D. (1977). "Colorado Territory". In Fischer, Leroy H. (ed.). The Western Territories in the Civil War. Manhattan, KS.
- Jenkins, Jeffery A. (2013). Fighting for the Speakership: The House and the Rise of Party Government. Princeton, NJ: Princeton University Press.
- Kingsbury, George W. (1915). History of Dakota Territory. Vol. 1. Chicago: S. J. Clarke Publishing Company.
- Lamar, Howard Roberts (1956). Dakota Territory, 1861–1889: A Study of Frontier Politics. New Haven, CT: Yale University Press.
- Martis, Kenneth C. (1989). The Historical Atlas of Political Parties in the United States Congress, 1789-1989. New York: Macmillan Publishing Company. ISBN 978-0029201701.
- McLoughlin, William G. (1986). Rhode Island: A History. New York: W. W. Norton & Company. ISBN 978-0-393-30271-4.
- McPherson, James M. (1988). Battle Cry of Freedom: The Civil War Era. New York: Oxford University.
- Munroe, John A. (2006). History of Delaware (5th ed.). Newark: University of Delaware Press.
- Sheldon, Addison E., ed. (1918). The Nebraska Blue Book and Historical Register. Lincoln: Nebraska Legislative Reference Bureau.
- Smith, Adam I. P. (2006). No Party Now: Politics in the Civil War North. New York: Oxford University Press. ISBN 978-0-19-518865-3.
- Vermont (2026). "Election Results Archive". Vermont Official State Website.
- Whitney, Orson F. (1893). History of Utah. Vol. 2. Salt Lake City.
- Winters, John D. (1963). The Civil War in Louisiana. Baton Rouge: Louisiana State University Press.
