= Albert Todd =

Albert Todd may refer to:

- Albert Todd (Missouri politician) (1813–1885), American politician and lawyer
- Albert M. Todd (1850–1931), businessman and politician from the U.S. state of Michigan
- Albert E. Todd (1878–1928), Canadian politician
- Albert Wheeler Todd (1856–1924), American architect
