= Elijah Risley =

American politician

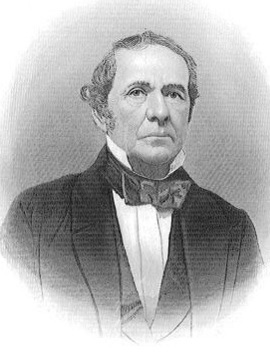
- Risley, 1875

Member of the U.S. House of Representatives from New York's 31st district
- In office March 4, 1849 – March 3, 1851
- Preceded by: Dudley Marvin
- Succeeded by: Frederick S. Martin

Personal details
- Born: May 7, 1787 Connecticut, USA
- Died: January 9, 1870 (aged 82) Fredonia, New York, USA
- Resting place: East Main Street Cemetery, Dalton, Massachusetts
- Party: Whig

Elijah Risley (May 7, 1787 – January 9, 1870) was a U.S. representative from New York.

Born in Connecticut, Risley completed preparatory studies before moving to Fredonia, New York, in 1807, where he engaged in mercantile pursuits. Risley was the sheriff of Chautauqua County, New York, from 1825 to 1828, and later became supervisor of the town of Pomfret in 1835.

From 1833 to 1853, he engaged in the cultivation of garden seeds.

Risley was elected as a Whig to the Thirty-first Congress on March 4, 1849, and served until March 3, 1851. He was not a candidate for renomination in 1850. He was also a major general in the state militia.

Risley died in Fredonia, New York, on January 9, 1870, and was interred in the East Main Street Cemetery.

== Sources ==
- United States Congress. "Elijah Risley (id: R000270)". Biographical Directory of the United States Congress.

U.S. House of Representatives
Preceded by Dudley Marvin	Member of the U.S. House of Representatives from New York's 31st congressional district 1849–1851	Succeeded by Frederick S. Martin
