= Judson W. Sherman =

American politician

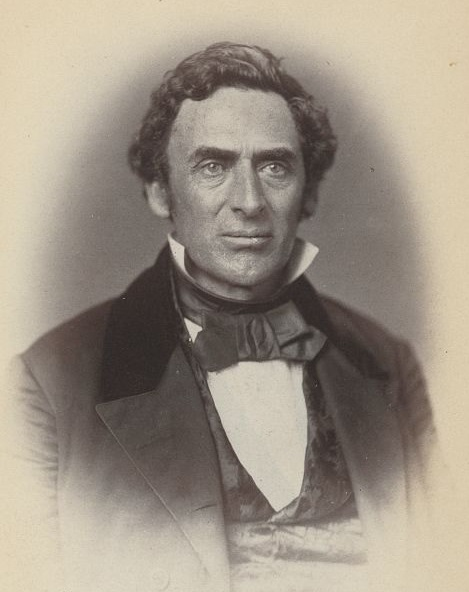
- Judson W. Sherman, New York Congressman

Member of the U.S. House of Representatives from New York's 30th district
- In office March 4, 1857 – March 3, 1859
- Preceded by: Benjamin Pringle
- Succeeded by: Augustus Frank

Personal details
- Born: 1808 New York State, U.S.
- Died: November 12, 1881 (aged 72–73) Angelica, New York, U.S.
- Resting place: Until the Day Dawn Cemetery, Angelica, New York, U.S.
- Party: Republican
- Other political affiliations: Democratic-Republican; Whig

Judson W. Sherman (1808 – November 12, 1881) was a U.S. representative from New York.

== Early life and career ==
Judson W. Sherman was born in New York State in 1808. He completed a preparatory education, and settled in Angelica, New York.

Sherman became involved in politics and government, first as a Democratic republican, and later as a Whig. He attended several state and county conventions as a delegate, and held several local offices in Angelica. From 1831 to 1837 he served Allegany County Clerk. In addition, he later served as Deputy New York State Treasurer in the 1850s. He ran unsuccessfully for the U.S. House of Representatives in 1842 and 1852.

Sherman was elected as a Republican to the Thirty-fifth Congress and served one term (March 4, 1857 – March 3, 1859).

== Military service ==
In September 1861 Sherman joined the Union Army for the American Civil War, receiving appointment as a commissary of subsistence officer with the rank of captain and serving until resigning his commission on November 9, 1861.

== Death and burial ==
Sherman died in Angelica, New York on November 12, 1881. He was interred at Until the Day Dawn Cemetery in Angelica.

== Sources ==
- United States Congress. "Judson W. Sherman (id: S000347)". Biographical Directory of the United States Congress.

U.S. House of Representatives
Preceded by Benjamin Pringle	Member of the U.S. House of Representatives from New York's 30th congressional district 1857–1859	Succeeded by Augustus Frank
