= 1858 United States House of Representatives elections in Ohio =

Ohio elected its members October 12, 1858, netting a 3-seat Republican gain.

District	Incumbent	Party	First elected	Result	Candidates
Ohio 1	George H. Pendleton	Democratic	1856	Incumbent re-elected.	✓ George H. Pendleton (Democratic) 51.2%; Timothy C. Day (Opposition) 48.8%
Ohio 2	William S. Groesbeck	Democratic	1856	Incumbent lost re-election. New member elected. Republican gain.	✓ John A. Gurley (Republican) 52.6%; William S. Groesbeck (Democratic) 47.4%
Ohio 3	Clement L. Vallandigham	Democratic	1856 (Note: Contested election)	Incumbent re-elected.	✓ Clement L. Vallandigham (Democratic) 50.5%; Lewis D. Campbell (Republican) 49.5%
Ohio 4	Matthias H. Nichols	Republican	1852	Incumbent lost re-election. New member elected. Democratic gain.	✓ William Allen (Democratic) 50.2%; Matthias H. Nichols (Republican) 49.8%
Ohio 5	Richard Mott	Republican	1854	Incumbent retired. New member elected. Republican hold.	✓ James M. Ashley (Republican) 51.3%; William Mungen (Democratic) 48.7%
Ohio 6	Joseph R. Cockerill	Democratic	1856	Incumbent retired. New member elected. Democratic hold.	✓ William Howard (Democratic) 53.0%; Reader W. Clarke (Republican) 47.0%
Ohio 7	Aaron Harlan	Republican	1852	Incumbent lost renomination. New member elected. Republican hold.	✓ Thomas Corwin (Republican) 63.8%; Charles W. Blair (Democratic) 36.2%
Ohio 8	Benjamin Stanton	Republican	1854	Incumbent re-elected.	✓ Benjamin Stanton (Republican) 59.5%; William Hubbard (Democratic) 40.5%
Ohio 9	Lawrence W. Hall	Democratic	1856	Incumbent lost re-election. New member elected. Republican gain.	✓ John Carey (Republican) 50.3%; Lawrence W. Hall (Republican) 49.7%
Ohio 10	Joseph Miller	Democratic	1856	Incumbent lost re-election. New member elected. Republican gain.	✓ Carey A. Trimble (Republican) 55.0%; Joseph Miller (Democratic) 45.0%
Ohio 11	Albert C. Thompson	Republican	1854	Incumbent retired. New member elected. Democratic gain.	✓ Charles D. Martin (Democratic) 50.7%; Nelson H. Van Vorhes (Republican) 49.3%
Ohio 12	Samuel S. Cox	Democratic	1856	Incumbent re-elected.	✓ Samuel S. Cox (Republican) 51.8%; Lucius Case (Democratic) 48.2%
Ohio 13	John Sherman	Republican	1854	Incumbent re-elected.	✓ John Sherman (Republican) 57.1%; S. J. Patrick (Democratic) 42.9%
Ohio 14	Philemon Bliss	Republican	1854	Incumbent retired. New member elected. Republican hold. Successor died May 31, 1859, leading to a special election.	✓ Cyrus Spink (Republican) 56.3%; J. P. Jeffries (Democratic) 43.7%
Ohio 15	Joseph Burns	Democratic	1856	Incumbent lost re-election. New member elected. Republican gain.	✓ William Helmick (Republican) 50.7%; Joseph Burns (Democratic) 49.3%
Ohio 16	Cydnor B. Tompkins	Republican	1856	Incumbent re-elected.	✓ Cydnor B. Tompkins (Republican) 52.8%; George W. Manypenny (Democratic) 47.2%
Ohio 17	William Lawrence	Democratic	1856	Incumbent retired. New member elected. Republican gain.	✓ Thomas C. Theaker (Republican) 50.3%; Benjamin T. Sprigg (Democratic) 49.7%
Ohio 18	Benjamin F. Leiter	Republican	1854	Incumbent retired. New member elected. Republican hold.	✓ Sidney Edgerton (Republican) 53.3%; J. L. Ranney (Democratic) 46.7%
Ohio 19	Edward Wade	Republican	1852	Incumbent re-elected.	✓ Edward Wade (Republican) 65.1%; J. W. Gray (Democratic) 34.9%
Ohio 20	Joshua Reed Giddings	Republican	1843	Incumbent lost renomination. New member elected. Republican hold.	✓ John Hutchins (Republican) 64.7%; David Tod (Democratic) 35.3%
Ohio 21	John Bingham	Republican	1854	Incumbent re-elected.	✓ John Bingham (Republican) 57.3%; Thomas Means (Democratic) 42.7%

== See also ==
- 1859 Ohio's 14th congressional district special election
- 1858 and 1859 United States House of Representatives elections
- List of United States representatives from Ohio
