= Frederick S. Martin =

American politician (1794–1865)

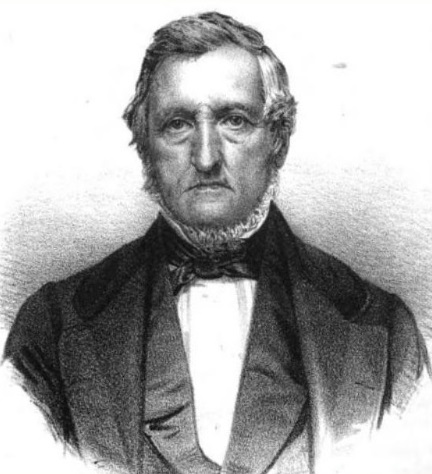
Frederick S. Martin, New York Congressman.

Frederick Stanley Martin (April 25, 1794 – June 28, 1865) was a U.S. representative from New York.

== Biography ==
Born in West Haven, Vermont, Martin went to New Hartford, New York, in 1804 and attended the local schools. He moved to Whitehall, New York, in 1810 and became employed in a mercantile establishment and later as a sailor.

He settled in Olean, New York, in the spring of 1818, ran a hotel, and also carried on a lumber business. From 1826 until 1833 he served in the state militia, and attained the rank of lieutenant colonel. He served as town supervisor of Olean in 1830, 1831, 1836, and 1838.

He was appointed postmaster of Olean on December 23, 1830, and served until November 14, 1839. In 1831 he started his own mercantile and dry goods firm, which he operated for 20 years before selling it to his son. He was appointed judge of the county court in January 1840 by Governor Seward and served for five years.

Beginning in the mid-1830s, Martin was a leading proponent of constructing the Genesee Valley Canal. He was a member of the New York State Senate (32nd D.) in 1848 and 1849; and of the New York State Assembly (Cattaraugus Co., 1st D.) in 1850.

Martin was elected as a Whig to the Thirty-second Congress (March 4, 1851 – March 3, 1853). After leaving Congress, he renewed his former business pursuits.

He died in Olean on June 28, 1865. He was originally interred at Oak Lawn Cemetery in Olean. On April 29, 1896 was reinterred at Mount View Cemetery in Olean.

== Sources ==
- United States Congress. "Frederick S. Martin (id: M000180)". Biographical Directory of the United States Congress.

New York State Senate
Preceded by new district	New York State Senate; 32nd District; 1848–1849	Succeeded by Robert Owen Jr.
New York State Assembly
Preceded by Seth R. Crittenden	New York State Assembly; Cattaraugus County (1st D.); 1850	Succeeded by Alonzo A. Gregory
U.S. House of Representatives
Preceded by Elijah Risley	Member of the U.S. House of Representatives from New York's 31st congressional district 1851–1853	Succeeded by Thomas T. Flagler
