= Benjamin Pringle =

American politician

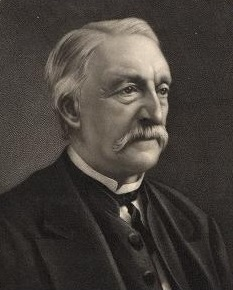
Benjamin Pringle, Congressman from New York

Benjamin Pringle (November 9, 1807 – June 7, 1887) was a United States representative from New York. Born in Richfield Springs, Otsego County, he completed preparatory studies, studied law, was admitted to the bar in 1830 and practiced for a number of years. He was president of a bank in Batavia, Genesee County and was judge of the Genesee County Court from 1841 to 1846.

Pringle was elected as a Whig to the Thirty-third Congress and reelected to the Thirty-fourth Congress, holding office from March 4, 1853, to March 3, 1857. During the Thirty-fourth Congress, he was chairman of the Committee on Indian Affairs. He was an unsuccessful candidate for reelection in 1856 to the Thirty-fifth Congress and was a member of the New York State Assembly (Genesee Co.) in 1862. Pringle was appointed by President Abraham Lincoln in 1863 judge of the court of arbitration in Cape Town (in what is now South Africa) under the treaty with Great Britain of April 7, 1862 for the suppression of the African slave trade. He was appointed a member of the board of trustees of the State Institution for the Blind in 1873, and in 1887 died in Hastings, Dakota County, Minnesota. Interment was in the Old Cemetery, Batavia.

U.S. House of Representatives
| Preceded by Reuben Robie | Member of the U.S. House of Representatives from New York's 30th congressional district 1853–1857 | Succeeded by Judson W. Sherman |
New York State Assembly
| Preceded by George W. Wright | New York State Assembly; Genesee County; 1862 | Succeeded by Loren Green |
