= Thomas T. Flagler =

American politician (1811–1897)

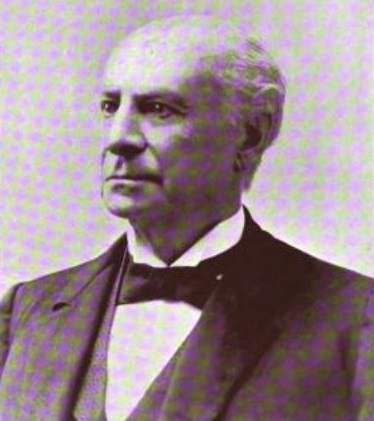

Member of the U.S. House of Representatives from New York's 31st district
- In office March 4, 1853 – March 3, 1857
- Preceded by: Frederick S. Martin
- Succeeded by: Silas M. Burroughs

Treasurer of Niagara County, New York
- In office 1849–1852
- Preceded by: None (Position created)
- Succeeded by: Alfred Van Wagoner

Member of the New York State Assembly
- In office January 1, 1860 – December 31, 1860
- Preceded by: James Sweeney
- Succeeded by: Henry P. Smith
- Constituency: Niagara County's 1st district
- In office January 1, 1842 – December 31, 1843 Serving with Francis O. Pratt
- Preceded by: Peter B. Porter Jr., Francis O. Pratt
- Succeeded by: John Sweeney, Luther Wilson
- Constituency: Niagara County

Personal details
- Born: Thomas Thorn Flagler; October 12, 1811 Pleasant Valley, New York, U.S.
- Died: September 6, 1897 (aged 85) Lockport, New York, U.S.
- Resting place: Glenwood Cemetery, Lockport, New York, US
- Party: Republican
- Other political affiliations: Whig
- Spouse: Huldah M. Barrett (m. 1838)
- Children: 6
- Occupation: Businessman

Thomas Thorn Flagler (October 12, 1811 – September 6, 1897) was an American businessman and politician from New York. Originally a Whig, then a member of the Republican Party, Flagler served as a member of the New York State Assembly from 1842 to 1843, and as treasurer of Niagara County from 1849 to 1852. He served in the United States House of Representatives from 1853 to 1857. In 1860, Flagler served again in the state Assembly.

== Early life ==
Thomas T. Flagler was born in Pleasant Valley, New York on October 12, 1811, the son of Abraham Flagler and Sarah (Thorn) Flagler. He was raised and educated in Ulysses and began working at age 11 when he was hired by a local tannery to chop hemlock bark used for processing leather. Flagler was later apprenticed as a printer for the Chenango Republican newspaper in Oxford. At age 19, he and a partner purchased the newspaper from his employer. Flagler edited and published the Republican for five years.

== Business career ==
In March 1836, Flagler moved to Lockport. After two years as a journeyman printer, he bought the Niagara Courier, a Whig-affiliated newspaper, which he published for six years. Publishing the Courier led to his participation in politics, and he began to make campaign speeches on behalf of Whig candidates including William H. Seward. In 1842, he became the owner and operator of a retail hardware business, which he managed in conjunction with various partners until 1869.

Flagler was also involved in several other Lockport-based enterprises, including serving on the board of directors of the Lockport Hydraulic Company, which purchased and repurposed surplus water from operation of the Erie Canal's Flight of Five Locks near Lockport. To make use of this water in industrial manufacturing, Flagler was one of the founders of the Holly Manufacturing Company, which produced pumps and other equipment for constructing and operating water works. In addition to serving as a director, Flagler was the company's longtime president.

In addition to Holly Manufacturing, Flagler’s other ventures included serving as president and a director of the Lockport Gas Light Company, president and director of the Niagara County National Bank, president of the Buffalo and Lockport Railroad, and president of the Fond du Lac Water Company.

== Political career ==
Originally a Whig in politics, Flagler was elected to the New York State Assembly in 1842 and 1843. In his first term, he chaired the Committee on Grievances. In his second, he was a member of the Committee on Canals. From 1849 to 1852, he served as treasurer of Niagara County, the first individual to hold this position after it was created.

As an opponent of expanding slavery, including the Compromise of 1850, in 1852 he was elected to the United States House of Representatives as a Whig. He was reelected in 1854 as a Whig. Flagler served from March 4, 1853 to March 3, 1857. He was not a candidate for reelection in 1856. During his congressional career, Flagler was a strong opponent of the Kansas-Nebraska Act, believing that it would permit the continued spread of slavery.

By now a Republican, in 1860, Flagler again served in the state Assembly. During this term, he served as chairman of the Committee on Ways and Means. He was also chosen as a delegate to the 1867–1868 state constitutional convention. When a hospital was founded in Lockport in 1888, Flagler donated his house, and the facility was named Flagler Hospital in his honor. A devout Presbyterian, he was ruling elder of Lockport's First Presbyterian Church for over 50 years, as well as superintendent of the church’s Sunday school. In addition, he was the longtime president of the Presbytery of Niagara.

== Personal life ==
In 1838, Flagler married Huldah M. Barrett. They were the parents of six children, four of whom lived to adulthood—Horace, Lucy, Ida, and Clara.

Flagler died in Lockport on September 6, 1897. He was buried at Glenwood Cemetery in Lockport.

U.S. House of Representatives
Preceded by Frederick S. Martin	Member of the U.S. House of Representatives from New York's 31st congressional district 1853–1857	Succeeded by Silas M. Burroughs
