= New York's 31st congressional district =

Former congressional district

- Obsolete district
- Created: 1820
- Eliminated: 2000
- Years active: 1823-2003

New York's 31st congressional district was a congressional district for the United States House of Representatives in New York. It was eliminated as a result of the 2000 census. It was last represented by Amo Houghton who was redistricted into the 29th district.

== Voting ==
Election results from presidential races
Year	Office	Results
1992	President	Bush 40–34%
1996	President	Clinton 44–41%

== Past components ==
- 1863–1875: Parts of Buffalo
- 1875–1897: All of Wyoming, Genesee and Niagara counties
- 1875–1897: All of Wyoming, Genesee and Niagara counties
- 1903–1913: All of Cayuga, Ontario, Wayne and Yates counties
- 1913–1945: All of Clinton, Essex, Franklin, and St. Lawrence counties
- 1945–1953: All of Fulton, Hamilton, Montgomery, Otsego, and Schenectady counties
- 1953–1963: All of Clinton, Essex, Saratoga, Warren, and Washington counties; parts of Rensselaer county
- 1963–1969: All of Franklin, Jefferson, Lewis, Oswego, and St. Lawrence counties
- 1969–1971: All of Clinton, Franklin, Jefferson, Lewis, Oswego, and St. Lawrence counties
- 1971–1973: All of Clinton, Franklin, Jefferson, and St. Lawrence counties; parts of Essex, and Oswego counties
- 1973–1983: All of Fulton, Hamilton, Herkimer, Oneida, and Schoharie counties; parts of Montgomery, Otsego, and Schenectady counties
- 1983–1993: All of Wyoming county; parts of Cattaraugus, Erie, Livingston, and Ontario counties
- 1993–2003: All of Allegany, Cattaraugus, Chautauqua, Chemung, Schuyler, Steuben, and Yates counties; parts of Cayuga, Seneca, and Tompkins counties

== List of members representing the district ==
Representative	Party	Years	Cong ress	Electoral history
District established March 4, 1833
Abner Hazeltine (Jamestown)	Anti-Masonic	March 4, 1833 – March 3, 1835	23rd 24th	Elected in 1832.
Abner Hazeltine (Jamestown)	Anti-Jacksonian	March 4, 1835 – March 3, 1837	23rd 24th	Re-elected in 1834.
Richard P. Marvin (Jamestown)	Whig	March 4, 1837 – March 3, 1841	25th 26th	Elected in 1836. Re-elected in 1838.
Staley N. Clarke (Ellicottville)	Whig	March 4, 1841 – March 3, 1843	27th	Elected in 1840.
Asher Tyler (Ellicottville)	Whig	March 4, 1843 – March 3, 1845	28th	Elected in 1842.
Abner Lewis (Panama)	Whig	March 4, 1845 – March 3, 1847	29th	Elected in 1844.
Dudley Marvin (Ripley)	Whig	March 4, 1847 – March 3, 1849	30th	Elected in 1846.
Elijah Risley (Fredonia)	Whig	March 4, 1849 – March 3, 1851	31st	Elected in 1848.
Frederick S. Martin (Olean)	Whig	March 4, 1851 – March 3, 1853	32nd	Elected in 1850.
Thomas T. Flagler (Lockport)	Whig	March 4, 1853 – March 3, 1855	33rd 34th	Elected in 1852.
Thomas T. Flagler (Lockport)	Opposition	March 4, 1855 – March 3, 1857	33rd 34th	Re-elected in 1854.
Silas M. Burroughs (Medina)	Republican	March 4, 1857 – June 3, 1860	35th 36th	Elected in 1856. Re-elected in 1858. Died.
Vacant		June 4, 1860 – December 4, 1860	36th	
Edwin R. Reynolds (Albion)	Republican	December 5, 1860 – March 3, 1861	36th	Elected to finish Burroughs's term.
Burt Van Horn (Newfane)	Republican	March 4, 1861 – March 3, 1863	37th	Elected in 1860.
Reuben E. Fenton (Frewsburg)	Republican	March 4, 1863 – December 20, 1864	38th	Redistricted from 33rd district and re-elected in 1862. Resigned after being elected Governor of New York.
Vacant		December 20, 1864 – March 4, 1865	38th	
Henry Van Aernam (Franklinville)	Republican	March 4, 1865 – March 3, 1869	39th 40th	Elected in 1864. Re-elected in 1866.
Porter Sheldon (Jamestown)	Republican	March 4, 1869 – March 3, 1871	41st	Elected in 1868.
Walter L. Sessions (Panama)	Republican	March 4, 1871 – March 3, 1873	42nd	Elected in 1870. Redistricted to 32nd district.
Lyman K. Bass (Buffalo)	Republican	March 4, 1873 – March 3, 1875	43rd	Elected in 1872. Redistricted to 32nd district.
George G. Hoskins (Attica)	Republican	March 4, 1875 – March 3, 1877	44th	Redistricted from 30th district and re-elected in 1874.
Charles B. Benedict (Attica)	Democratic	March 4, 1877 – March 3, 1879	45th	Elected in 1876.
Richard Crowley (Lockport)	Republican	March 4, 1879 – March 3, 1883	46th 47th	Elected in 1878. Re-elected in 1880.
Robert S. Stevens (Attica)	Democratic	March 4, 1883 – March 3, 1885	48th	Elected in 1882.
John G. Sawyer (Albion)	Republican	March 4, 1885 – March 3, 1891	49th 50th 51st	Elected in 1884. Re-elected in 1886. Re-elected in 1888.
James Wolcott Wadsworth (Geneseo)	Republican	March 4, 1891 – March 3, 1893	52nd	Elected in 1890. Redistricted to 30th district.
John Van Voorhis (Rochester)	Republican	March 4, 1893 – March 3, 1895	53rd	Elected in 1892.
Henry C. Brewster (Rochester)	Republican	March 4, 1895 – March 3, 1899	54th 55th	Elected in 1894. Re-elected in 1896.
James M.E. O'Grady (Rochester)	Republican	March 4, 1899 – March 3, 1901	56th	Elected in 1898.
James B. Perkins (Rochester)	Republican	March 4, 1901 – March 3, 1903	57th	Elected in 1900. Redistricted to 32nd district.
Sereno E. Payne (Auburn)	Republican	March 4, 1903 – March 3, 1913	58th 59th 60th 61st 62nd	Redistricted from 28th district and re-elected in 1902. Re-elected in 1904. Re-elected in 1906. Re-elected in 1908. Re-elected in 1910. Redistricted to 36th district.
Edwin A. Merritt (Potsdam)	Republican	March 4, 1913 – December 4, 1914	63rd	Redistricted from 26th district and re-elected in 1912. Re-elected in 1914. Died.
Vacant		December 5, 1914 – November 1, 1915	63rd 64th	
Bertrand H. Snell (Potsdam)	Republican	November 2, 1915 – January 3, 1939	64th 65th 66th 67th 68th 69th 70th 71st 72nd 73rd 74th 75th	Elected to finish Merritt's term. Re-elected in 1916. Re-elected in 1918. Re-elected in 1920. Re-elected in 1922. Re-elected in 1924. Re-elected in 1926. Re-elected in 1928. Re-elected in 1930. Re-elected in 1932. Re-elected in 1934. Re-elected in 1936. Retired.
Wallace E. Pierce (Plattsburgh)	Republican	January 3, 1939 – January 3, 1940	76th	Elected in 1938. Died.
Vacant		January 4, 1940 – February 12, 1940	76th	
Clarence E. Kilburn (Malone)	Republican	February 13, 1940 – January 3, 1945	76th 77th 78th	Elected to finish Pierce's term. Re-elected in 1940. Re-elected in 1942. Redistricted to 34th district.
Bernard W. Kearney (Gloversville)	Republican	January 3, 1945 – January 3, 1953	79th 80th 81st 82nd	Redistricted from 30th district and re-elected in 1944. Re-elected in 1946. Re-elected in 1948. Re-elected in 1950. Redistricted to 32nd district.
Dean P. Taylor (Troy)	Republican	January 3, 1953 – January 3, 1961	83rd 84th 85th 86th	Redistricted from 33rd district and re-elected in 1952. Re-elected in 1954. Re-elected in 1956. Re-elected in 1958.
Carleton J. King (Saratoga Springs)	Republican	January 3, 1961 – January 3, 1963	87th	Elected in 1960. Redistricted to 30th district.
Clarence E. Kilburn (Malone)	Republican	January 3, 1963 – January 3, 1965	88th	Elected in 1962. Redistricted from 33rd district.
Robert C. McEwen (Ogdensburg)	Republican	January 3, 1965 – January 3, 1973	89th 90th 91st 92nd	Elected in 1964. Re-elected in 1966. Re-elected in 1968. Re-elected in 1970. Redistricted to 30th district.
Donald J. Mitchell (Herkimer)	Republican	January 3, 1973 – January 3, 1983	93rd 94th 95th 96th 97th	Elected in 1972. Re-elected in 1974. Re-elected in 1976. Re-elected in 1978. Re-elected in 1980.
Jack Kemp (Hamburg)	Republican	January 3, 1983 – January 3, 1989	98th 99th 100th	Redistricted from 38th district and re-elected in 1982. Re-elected in 1984. Re-elected in 1986. Retired to run for U.S. President.
Bill Paxon (Williamsville)	Republican	January 3, 1989 – January 3, 1993	101st 102nd	Elected in 1988. Re-elected in 1990. Redistricted to 27th district.
Amo Houghton (Corning)	Republican	January 3, 1993 – January 3, 2003	103rd 104th 105th 106th 107th	Redistricted from 34th district and re-elected in 1992. Re-elected in 1994. Re-elected in 1996. Re-elected in 1998. Re-elected in 2000. Redistricted to 29th district.
District dissolved January 3, 2003

== Election results ==
Note that in New York State electoral politics there are numerous minor parties at various points on the political spectrum. Certain parties will invariably endorse either the Republican or Democratic candidate for every office, hence the state electoral results contain both the party votes, and the final candidate votes (Listed as "Recap").

US House election, 2000: New York District 31
Party	Candidate	Votes	%	±%
Republican	Amo Houghton (incumbent)	154,238	77.3	+9.3
Democratic	Kisun J. Peters	45,193	22.7	−2.6
Majority		109,045	54.7	+12.0
Turnout		199,431	100	+26.0

US House election, 1998: New York District 31
Party	Candidate	Votes	%	±%
Republican	Amo Houghton (incumbent)	107,615	68.0	−3.6
Democratic	Caleb Rossiter	40,091	25.3	−0.1
Right to Life	James R. Pierce, Sr.	10,546	6.7	+3.6
Majority		67,524	42.7	−3.5
Turnout		158,252	100	−19.0

US House election, 1996: New York District 31
Party	Candidate	Votes	%	±%
Republican	Amo Houghton (incumbent)	139,734	71.6	
Democratic	Bruce D. MacBain	49,502	25.4	
Right to Life	Le Roy Stewart Wilson	6,031	3.1	
Majority		90,232	46.2	
Turnout		195,267	100	
