= Augustus Frank =

American politician

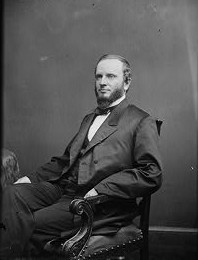

Member of the U.S. House of Representatives from New York
- In office March 4, 1859 – March 3, 1865
- Preceded by: Judson W. Sherman
- Succeeded by: Burt Van Horn
- Constituency: 30th district (1859–63); 29th district (1863–65)

Personal details
- Born: July 17, 1826 Warsaw, New York, U.S.
- Died: April 29, 1895 (aged 68) New York City, U.S.
- Resting place: Warsaw Town Cemetery; Warsaw, New York
- Party: Republican
- Spouse: Agnes McNair Frank
- Relations: George Washington Patterson; William Patterson
- Children: William Augustus; Mary Louise Frank
- Parent(s): Augustus Frank; Jane (Patterson) Frank
- Profession: Merchant; Railroad Executive; Banker; Politician

Augustus Frank (July 17, 1826 – April 29, 1895) was an American merchant, railroad executive, banker and politician. He served as a United States representative from the U.S. state of New York during the American Civil War.

== Early life ==
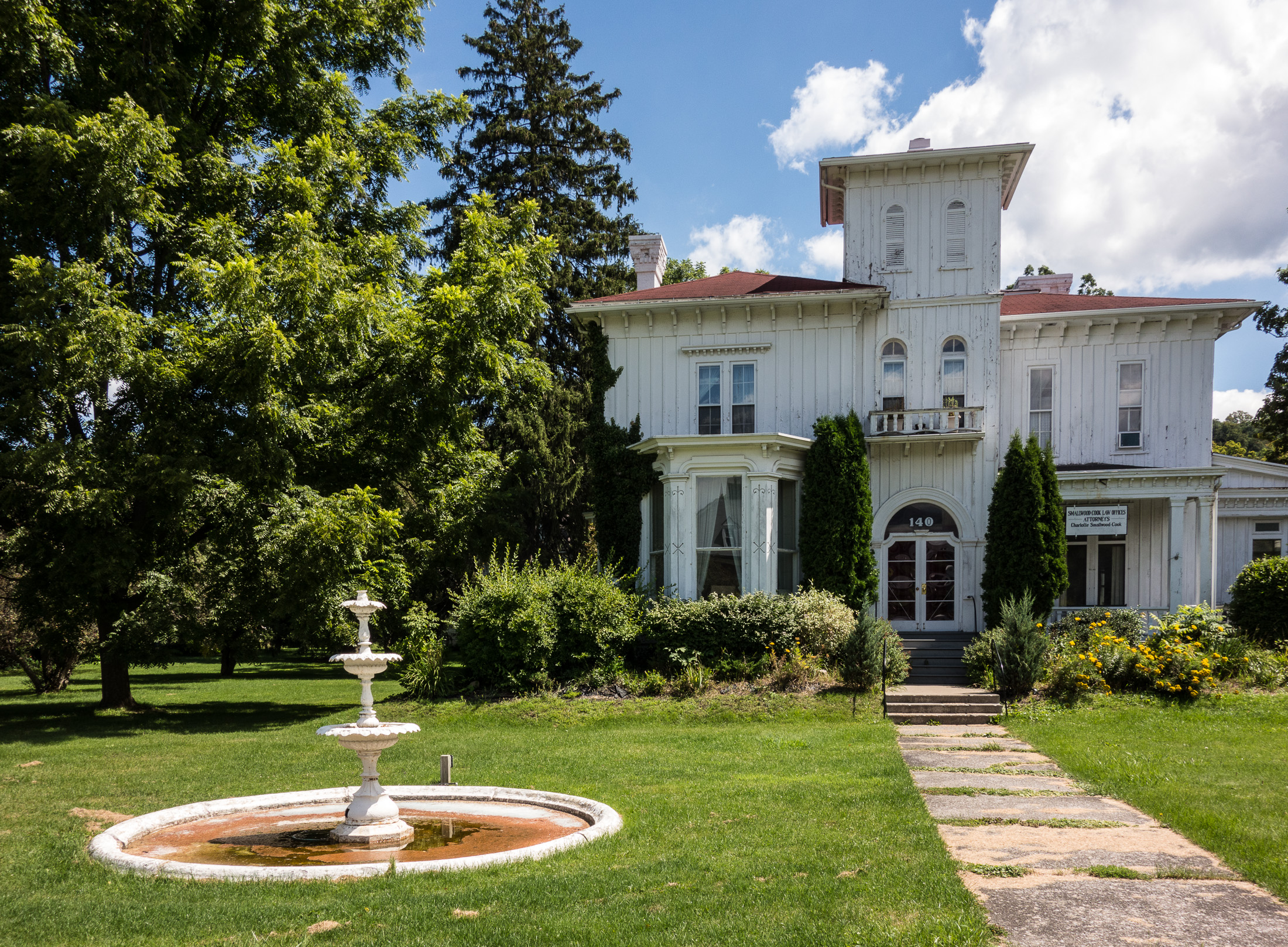
Augustus Frank House in Warsaw, NY

Frank was born in Warsaw, Wyoming County, the son of Augustus and Jane (Patterson) Frank. He attended the common schools and engaged in mercantile pursuits.

== Career ==
In 1856, he was a delegate to the Republican National Convention. He was elected and served three terms as a Republican Congressman from New York, serving from March 4, 1859, to March 3, 1865, in the 36th, 37th, and 38th Congresses. He was not a candidate for renomination in 1864. He was instrumental in the passage of the Thirteenth Amendment which abolished slavery.

After his final term in Congress, Frank became the director of the Wyoming County National Bank in 1865. In 1867 and 1868, he was a member of the New York constitutional convention. From 1870 to 1872, Frank was one of the managers of the Buffalo State Asylum for the Insane in Buffalo, New York. He organized the Bank of Warsaw in 1871 and served as its president until his death in 1895.

Frank was the director and vice president of the Buffalo and New York City Railroad Company in 1887–1893, and was also director of the Rochester Trust and Safe Deposit Company. In 1894, he was a delegate at large to the State constitutional convention. Frank was State commissioner for the preservation of public parks and was a member of the board of directors of the Buffalo, Rochester and Pittsburgh Railroad.

He died in New York City at the Murry Hill Hotel on Monday, April 29, 1895, from a combination of inflammatory rheumatism and Bright's Disease. He is interred in Warsaw Cemetery in Warsaw, New York.

== Family life ==
In 1867, Frank married Agnes McNair. The couple had two children, William Augustus and Mary Louise Frank. Their son died in infancy.

Frank was the nephew of two other U.S. Representatives, William Patterson and George Washington Patterson.

== See also ==
- New York's congressional delegations

U.S. House of Representatives
Preceded by Judson W. Sherman	Member of the U.S. House of Representatives from New York's 30th congressional district 1859–1863	Succeeded by John Ganson
Preceded by Alfred Ely	Member of the U.S. House of Representatives from New York's 29th congressional district 1863–1865	Succeeded by Burt Van Horn
