= Burt Van Horn =

American politician (1823–1896)

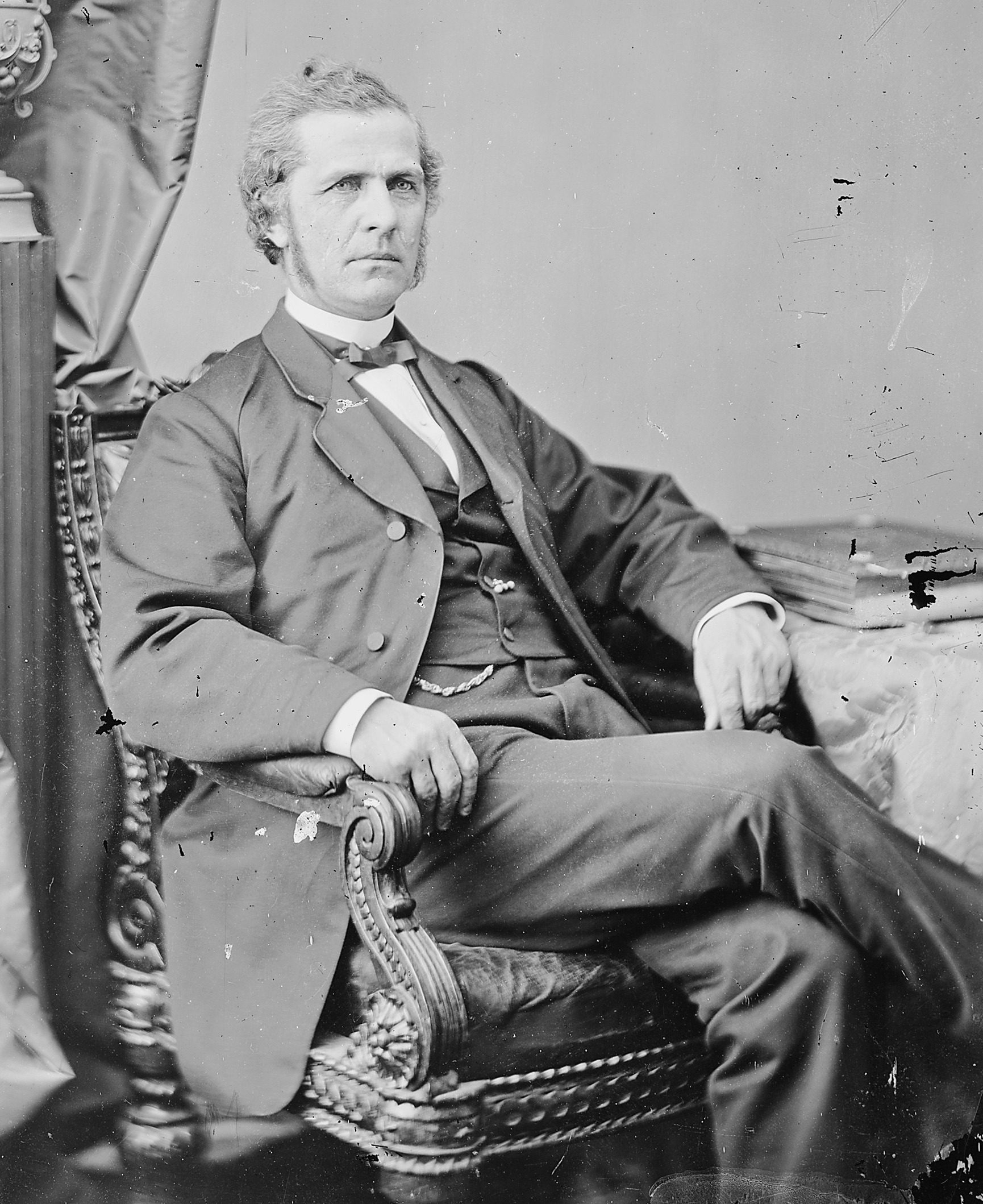

Member of the U.S. House of Representatives from New York
- In office March 4, 1865 – March 3, 1869
- Preceded by: Augustus Frank
- Succeeded by: John Fisher
- Constituency: 29th district
- In office March 4, 1861 – March 3, 1863
- Preceded by: Edwin R. Reynolds
- Succeeded by: Reuben E. Fenton
- Constituency: 31st district

Member of the New York State Assembly for Niagara County
- In office January 1, 1858 – December 31, 1860
- Preceded by: Elisha Clapp
- Succeeded by: Oliver P. Scovell
- Constituency: 1st district (1858); 2nd district (1859–1860)

Personal details
- Born: October 28, 1823 Newfane, New York, U.S.
- Died: April 1, 1896 (aged 72) Lockport, New York, U.S.
- Party: Republican

Burt Van Horn (October 28, 1823 – April 1, 1896) was an American politician. A member of the Republican Party, he served as United States representative from New York during the American Civil War. He represented New York's 31st District from 1861 to 1863, and the 29th District from 1865 to 1869. He was a staunch supporter of President Abraham Lincoln and the Union.

== Early life ==
Born in Newfane, New York, on October 28, 1823, to James Augustus Van Horn and Abigail Van Horn (née Carpenter). He attended the common schools, Yates Academy in Orleans County, and Hamilton Literary and Theological Institution (predecessor of Colgate University) in Hamilton. He engaged in agricultural pursuits in Niagara County and later in the manufacture of cloth.

== Career ==
Van Horn was a member of the New York State Assembly from 1858 to 1860. On January 15, 1860, standing before the Assembly, Burt delivered the speech, "Liberty and The Union".

Van Horn was elected as a Republican to the Thirty-seventh Congress, holding office from March 4, 1861, to March 3, 1863. He was elected to the Thirty-ninth and Fortieth Congresses, holding office from March 4, 1865, to March 3, 1869; he was not a candidate for renomination in 1868.

On March 31, 1868, Van Horn testified in the impeachment trial of President Andrew Johnson, having been called as a witness by the prosecution.

Van Horn moved to Lockport in 1867, where he engaged in the family farming and textile businesses. He was also involved with community banking, specifically making loans. He was a collector of internal revenue at Rochester from 1877 to 1882.

== Death ==
He died in 1896 in Lockport, NY and is interred at Glenwood Cemetery.

New York State Assembly
Preceded by Elisha Clapp	New York State Assembly; Niagara County, 1st District; 1858–1860	Succeeded by Henry P. Smith
U.S. House of Representatives
Preceded by Edwin R. Reynolds	Member of the U.S. House of Representatives from New York's 31st congressional district 1861–1863	Succeeded by Reuben E. Fenton
Preceded by Augustus Frank	Member of the U.S. House of Representatives from New York's 29th congressional district 1865–1869	Succeeded by John Fisher
