= Edwin R. Reynolds =

American politician

Edwin Ruthvin Reynolds
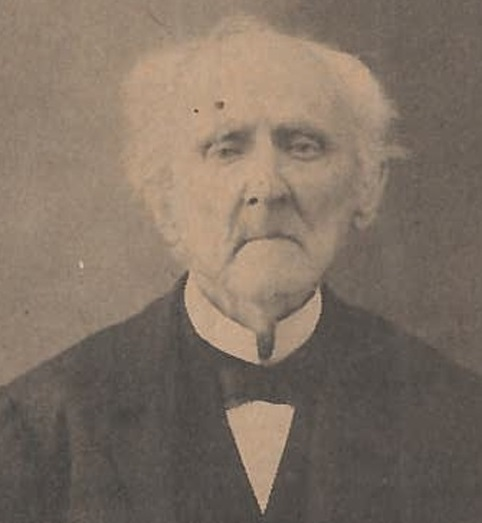
- Portrait of Reynolds in his later years. On display at Orleans County Courthouse, Albion, New York.

Member of the U.S. House of Representatives from New York's 31st district
- In office December 5, 1860 – March 3, 1861
- Preceded by: Silas M. Burroughs
- Succeeded by: Burt Van Horn

Personal details
- Born: February 16, 1816 Fort Ann, New York, U.S.
- Died: July 4, 1908 (aged 92) Albion, New York, U.S.
- Resting place: Mount Albion Cemetery
- Party: Republican
- Education: Brown University

Edwin Ruthvin Reynolds (February 16, 1816 – July 4, 1908) was a U.S. representative from New York.

== Biography ==
Born in Fort Ann, New York, he was son of Linus J. Reynolds (1790-1838) and Alice (Baker) Reynolds.

Linus Reynolds was the editor and publisher of the Northern Spectator newspaper in Poultney (town), Vermont, and Edwin Reynolds was an apprentice printer at the Spectator at the same time as Horace Greeley.

Edwin Reynolds graduated from Brown University and taught school. He was principal of Albion Academy in Barre, Orleans County, New York for six years. He was county school superintendent from 1843 to 1845.

He studied law, was admitted to the bar in 1843 and practiced in Albion. Reynolds served in local offices, including Justice of the Peace and Clerk of the Orleans County Board of Supervisors.

Reynolds was elected as a Republican to the Thirty-sixth Congress, filling the vacancy caused by the death of Silas M. Burroughs and served from December 5, 1860, to March 3, 1861.

During the American Civil War, Reynolds was a member of the committee which oversaw recruiting and enlistment for the Union Army in Orleans County.

Reynolds was Orleans County Judge and Surrogate Judge from 1864 to 1868, afterwards resuming the practice of law.

He was a presidential elector in 1869 and cast his ballot for Ulysses S. Grant. He supported Horace Greeley for president in 1872.

He died in Albion on July 4, 1908, and was interred in Mount Albion Cemetery.

U.S. House of Representatives
| Preceded by Silas M. Burroughs | Member of the U.S. House of Representatives from New York's 31st congressional district December 5, 1860 – March 3, 1861 | Succeeded by Burt Van Horn |
