= Silas M. Burroughs (politician) =

American politician

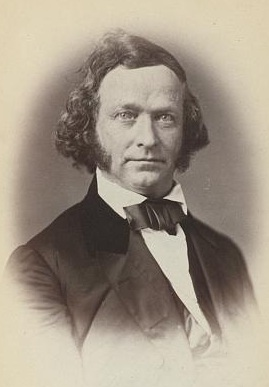

Member of the U.S. House of Representatives from New York's 31st district
- In office March 4, 1857 – June 3, 1860
- Preceded by: Thomas T. Flagler
- Succeeded by: Edwin R. Reynolds

New York State Assembly
- In office 1837; 1850-51; 1853

Personal details
- Born: July 16, 1810 Ovid, New York
- Died: June 3, 1860 (aged 49) Medina, New York
- Party: Republican
- Occupation: Lawyer

Silas Mainville Burroughs (July 16, 1810 – June 3, 1860) was a U.S. representative from New York.

== Biography ==
Born in Ovid, New York, Burroughs completed a preparatory course. He moved to Medina, New York, in 1834. He became Village Clerk of Medina in 1835; and a village trustee in 1836, from 1839 to 1843, and from 1845 to 1847.

He studied law, was admitted to the bar in 1840, and commenced practice in Medina. He was Village Attorney of Medina from 1845 to 1847. He was a brigadier general in the New York State Militia from 1848 to 1858.

Burroughs was a member of the New York State Assembly in 1837, 1850, 1851, and 1853.

He was elected as a Republican to the 35th and 36th United States Congresses, holding office from March 4, 1857, until his death in Medina on June 3, 1860.

When Burroughs died, he was a widower with two young children, Silas Mainville Burroughs, a pharmaceutical entrepreneur, and Adeline. He was buried at the Boxwood Cemetery in Medina.

== See also ==
- List of members of the United States Congress who died in office (1790–1899)

New York State Assembly
Preceded by John Chamberlain	New York State Assembly; Orleans County; 1837	Succeeded by Horatio Reed
Preceded by Reuben Roblee	New York State Assembly; Orleans County; 1850–1851	Succeeded by George M. Copeland
Preceded by George M. Copeland	New York State Assembly; Orleans County; 1853	Succeeded by Jeremiah Freeman
U.S. House of Representatives
Preceded by Thomas T. Flagler	Member of the U.S. House of Representatives from New York's 31st congressional district 1857–1860	Succeeded by Edwin R. Reynolds
