= Albert Todd (Missouri politician) =

American lawyer and politician

Albert Todd (March 4, 1813 – April 30, 1885) was an American lawyer and politician.

Todd, third son of Ira and Sally (Hmman) Todd, was born in Hartwick, New York., March 4, 1813. He had spent one year at Amherst College, before entering as Sophomore at Yale College, where he graduated in 1836. He taught a high school in Canaan, Connecticut, until the spring of 1837, when he began law studies with Judge Arphaxad Loomis, of Little Falls, New York. Upon his admission to the bar in 1839, he decided to emigrate to the West. He selected St. Louis and arrived there in November, 1839, beginning practice in March 1840. He gave special attention to questions affecting real property, and achieved distinguished success in litigated cases of this nature. Through apprehensions with regard to his health, he retired in 1860, at a comparatively early age, from active practice, confining himself thereafter to office consultations. He declined all political nominations until 1854, when he was elected to the Missouri House of Representatives. In 1860 he was an unsuccessful candidate for US Congress on the Bell and Everett ticket. In 1875, he was a member of the convention which revised the Constitution of Missouri. He was a director of Washington University in St. Louis, and served gratuitously for fifteen years in its Law Department as lecturer. Among his students was Lemma Barkeloo, the first female law student in the United States. After a month's illness, he died at his home in St. Louis, of meningitis, April 30, 1885, in his 73rd year.

On October 27, 1842, he married Elizabeth Wilson, of Little Falls, who died February 9, 1848, leaving a daughter who survived him. He next married, August 10, 1854, Caroline, daughter of Benjamin Johnson, of Bond County, Illinois, who survived him without children.

This article incorporates public domain material from the 1885 Yale Obituary Record.
