= Cydnor B. Tompkins =

American politician

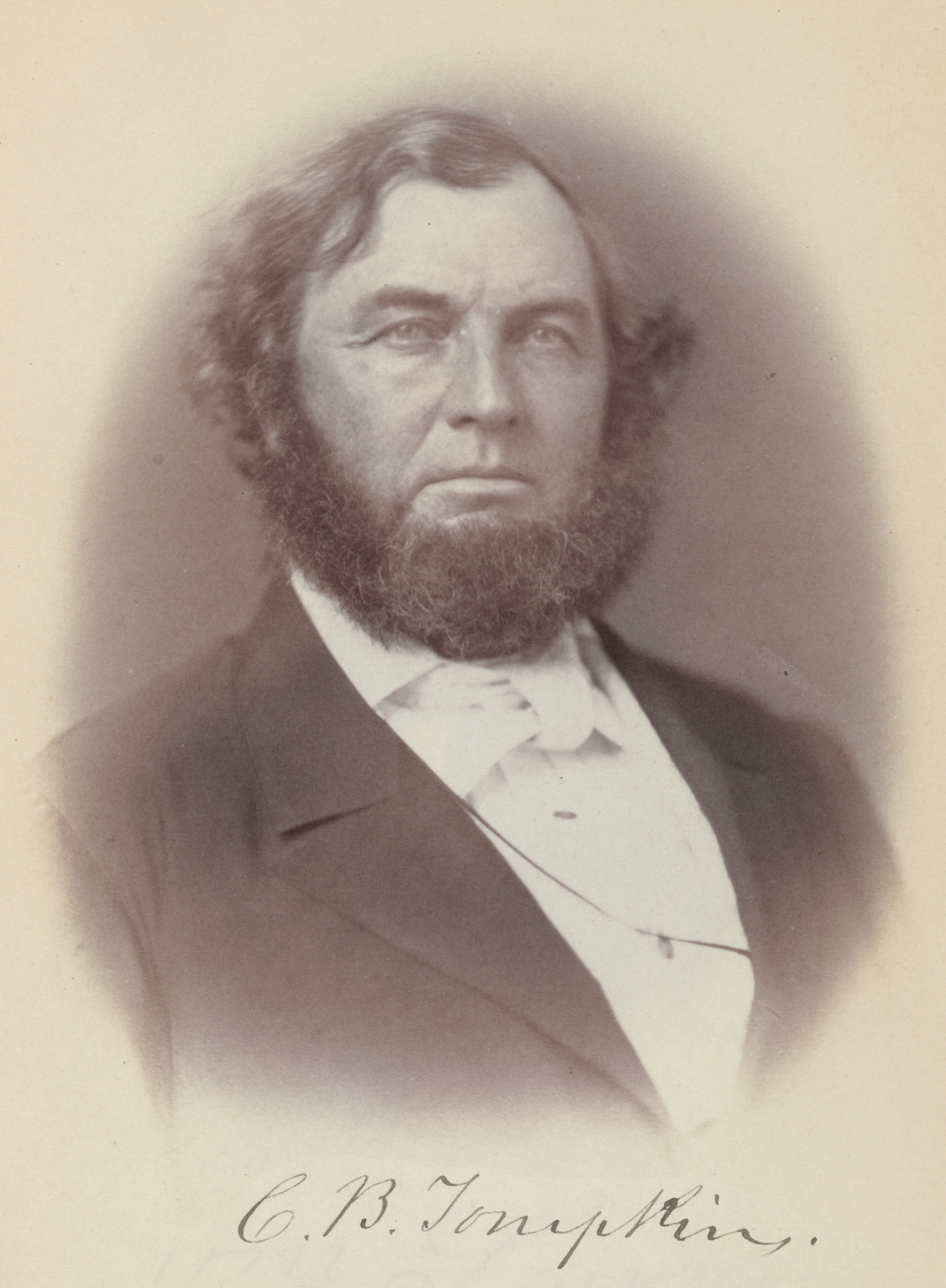
- in 35th Congress

Member of the U.S. House of Representatives from Ohio's 16th district
- In office March 4, 1857 – March 3, 1861
- Preceded by: Edward Ball
- Succeeded by: William P. Cutler

Personal details
- Born: Cydnor Bailey Tompkins; November 8, 1810 St. Clairsville, Ohio, U.S.
- Died: July 23, 1862 (aged 51) McConnelsville, Ohio, U.S.
- Resting place: McConnelsville Cemetery
- Party: Republican
- Education: Ohio University

Cydnor Bailey Tompkins (November 8, 1810 – July 23, 1862) was an American lawyer and politician who served two terms as a U.S. representative from Ohio from 1857 to 1861. He was the father of Emmett Tompkins.

== Early life and education ==
Born near St. Clairsville in Belmont County, Ohio, Tompkins moved with his parents to Morgan County in 1831 and settled near McConnelsville. He completed preparatory studies, and was graduated from the Ohio University at Athens in 1835. He studied law.

== Career ==
Tompkins was admitted to the bar in 1837 and commenced practice in McConnelsville, Morgan County, Ohio. He served as recorder of McConnelsville in 1840. He served as prosecuting attorney of Morgan County from 1848 to 1851. Street commissioner of McConnelsville in 1850. He served as member of the Republican State convention in 1855.

=== Congress ===
Tompkins was elected as a Republican to the Thirty-fifth and Thirty-sixth Congresses (March 4, 1857 – March 3, 1861). He served as chairman of the Committee on Militia (Thirty-sixth Congress).

On April 24, 1860, Tomkins delivered one of his most notable addresses: “Slavery: What It Was, What It Has Done, What It Intends to Do.” Published widely by the Republican Congressional Committee, the speech laid out a historical and moral case against slavery's expansion. Drawing on Revolutionary‑era resolutions and the words of the nation's founders, Tompkins argued that slavery had always been treated as an evil sustained only by local law. He rejected any notion that the Constitution recognized human beings as property, declaring: “I say that slavery is but the creation of some local enactment, and that no property can exist in a human being, unless it is made so by some law. The Constitution of the United States nowhere recognises slaves as property.” He warned of slavery's corrosive effects on society, politics, and education, and he listed a series of “aggressions” by the pro‑slavery party, from the annexation of Texas to the violence in Kansas, that had destabilized the Union. For Tompkins, the mission of the Republican Party was to draw “an impassable line” confining slavery to its existing limits, to suppress the African slave trade, and to preserve the western territories as “homes for free men.”

He was an unsuccessful candidate for renomination in 1860.

== Later life and death ==
Tompkins resumed the practice of law and died in McConnelsville, Ohio, July 23, 1862. He was interred in McConnelsville Cemetery.

U.S. House of Representatives
| Preceded by Edward Ball | Member of the U.S. House of Representatives from Ohio's 15th congressional district 1857-1861 | Succeeded by William P. Cutler |
