= List of United States representatives in the 36th Congress =

This is a complete list of United States representatives during the 36th United States Congress listed by seniority.

As an historical article, the districts and party affiliations listed reflect those during the 36th Congress (March 4, 1859 – March 3, 1861). Seats and party affiliations on similar lists for other congresses will be different for certain members.

Seniority depends on the date on which members were sworn into office. Since many members are sworn in on the same day, subsequent ranking is based on previous congressional service of the individual and then by alphabetical order by the last name of the representative.

Committee chairmanship in the House is often associated with seniority. However, party leadership is typically not associated with seniority.

Note: The "*" indicates that the representative/delegate may have served one or more non-consecutive terms while in the House of Representatives of the United States Congress.

== U.S. House seniority list ==
U.S. House seniority
Rank	Representative	Party	District	Seniority date (Previous service, if any)	No.# of term(s)	Notes
1	John S. Phelps	D	MO-06	March 4, 1845	8th term	Dean of the House
2	Thomas S. Bocock	D	VA-05	March 4, 1847	7th term	Left the House in 1861.
3	Williamson R. W. Cobb	D	AL-06	March 4, 1847	7th term	Resigned on January 30, 1861.
4	John McQueen	D	SC-01	February 12, 1849	7th term	Resigned on December 21, 1860.
5	Henry A. Edmundson	D	VA-12	March 4, 1849	6th term	Left the House in 1861.
6	John Millson	D	VA-02	March 4, 1849	6th term	Left the House in 1861.
7	Thomas B. Florence	D	PA-01	March 4, 1851	5th term	Left the House in 1861.
8	Galusha A. Grow	R	PA-14	March 4, 1851	5th term	
9	George S. Houston	D	AL-05	March 4, 1851; Previous service, 1841–1849.	9th term*	Resigned on January 21, 1861.
10	Israel Washburn Jr.	R	ME-05	March 4, 1851	5th term	Resigned on January 1, 1861.
11	William Barksdale	D	MS-03	March 4, 1853	4th term	Resigned on January 12, 1861.
12	William W. Boyce	D	SC-06	March 4, 1853	4th term	Resigned on December 21, 1860.
13	Francis B. Craige	D	NC-07	March 4, 1853	4th term	Left the House in 1861.
14	William H. English	D	IN-02	March 4, 1853	4th term	Left the House in 1861.
15	William Goode	D	VA-04	March 4, 1853; Previous service, 1841–1843.	5th term*	Died on July 3, 1859.
16	Thomas H. Ruffin	D	NC-02	March 4, 1853	4th term	Left the House in 1861.
17	William Smith	D	VA-07	March 4, 1853; Previous service, 1841–1843.	5th term*	Left the House in 1861.
18	Edward Wade	R	OH-19	March 4, 1853	4th term	Left the House in 1861.
19	Elihu B. Washburne	R	IL-01	March 4, 1853	4th term	
20	John Bingham	R	OH-21	March 4, 1855	3rd term	
21	Lawrence O'Bryan Branch	D	NC-04	March 4, 1855	3rd term	Left the House in 1861.
22	James Buffington	R	MA-02	March 4, 1855	3rd term	
23	Anson Burlingame	KN	MA-05	March 4, 1855	3rd term	Left the House in 1861.
24	Henry C. Burnett	D	KY-01	March 4, 1855	3rd term	
25	Schuyler Colfax	R	IN-09	March 4, 1855	3rd term	
26	John Covode	W	PA-19	March 4, 1855	3rd term	
27	Martin J. Crawford	D	GA-02	March 4, 1855	3rd term	Resigned on January 23, 1861.
28	Thomas G. Davidson	D	LA-03	March 4, 1855	3rd term	Left the House in 1861.
29	Henry W. Davis	D	MD-04	March 4, 1855	3rd term	Left the House in 1861.
30	James M. Harris	D	MD-03	March 4, 1855	3rd term	Left the House in 1861.
31	John Hickman	D	PA-06	March 4, 1855	3rd term	
32	Justin S. Morrill	R	VT-02	March 4, 1855	3rd term	
33	John U. Pettit	R	IN-11	March 4, 1855	3rd term	Left the House in 1861.
34	John Sherman	R	OH-13	March 4, 1855	3rd term	
35	Francis E. Spinner	R	NY-17	March 4, 1855	3rd term	Left the House in 1861.
36	Benjamin Stanton	R	OH-08	March 4, 1855; Previous service, 1851–1853.	4th term*	Left the House in 1861.
37	James A. Stewart	D	MD-01	March 4, 1855	3rd term	Left the House in 1861.
38	Mason Tappan	R	NH-02	March 4, 1855	3rd term	Left the House in 1861.
39	Miles Taylor	D	LA-02	March 4, 1855	3rd term	Resigned on February 5, 1861.
40	Henry Waldron	R	MI-02	March 4, 1855	3rd term	Left the House in 1861.
41	Cadwallader C. Washburn	R	WI-02	March 4, 1855	3rd term	Left the House in 1861.
42	Warren Winslow	D	NC-03	March 4, 1855	3rd term	Left the House in 1861.
43	John V. Wright	D	TN-07	March 4, 1855	3rd term	Left the House in 1861.
44	Laurence M. Keitt	D	SC-03	August 6, 1856; Previous service, 1853–1856.	4th term*	Resigned in December 1860.
45	Muscoe R.H. Garnett	D	VA-01	December 1, 1856	3rd term	Left the House in 1861.
46	Garnett Adrain	D	NJ-03	March 4, 1857	2nd term	Left the House in 1861.
47	Thomas L. Anderson	D	MO-02	March 4, 1857	2nd term	Left the House in 1861.
48	William T. Avery	D	TN-10	March 4, 1857	2nd term	Left the House in 1861.
49	Milledge L. Bonham	D	SC-04	March 4, 1857	2nd term	Resigned on December 21, 1860.
50	William D. Brayton	R	RI-02	March 4, 1857	2nd term	Left the House in 1861.
51	Silas M. Burroughs	R	NY-31	March 4, 1857	2nd term	Died on June 3, 1860.
52	Horace F. Clark	D	NY-08	March 4, 1857	2nd term	Left the House in 1861.
53	Sherrard Clemens	D	VA-10	March 4, 1857; Previous service, 1852–1853.	3rd term*	Left the House in 1861.
54	Clark B. Cochrane	R	NY-18	March 4, 1857	2nd term	Left the House in 1861.
55	John Cochrane	D	NY-06	March 4, 1857	2nd term	Left the House in 1861.
56	Samuel S. Cox	D	OH-12	March 4, 1857	2nd term	
57	James Craig	D	MO-04	March 4, 1857	2nd term	Left the House in 1861.
58	Jabez Lamar Monroe Curry	D	AL-07	March 4, 1857	2nd term	Resigned on January 21, 1861.
59	Samuel R. Curtis	R	IA-01	March 4, 1857	2nd term	
60	John G. Davis	D	IN-07	March 4, 1857; Previous service, 1851–1855.	4th term*	Left the House in 1861.
61	Reuben Davis	D	MS-02	March 4, 1857	2nd term	Resigned on January 12, 1861.
62	Henry L. Dawes	R	MA-11	March 4, 1857	2nd term	
63	William H. Dimmick	D	PA-13	March 4, 1857	2nd term	Left the House in 1861.
64	John F. Farnsworth	R	IL-02	March 4, 1857	2nd term	Left the House in 1861.
65	Reuben Fenton	R	NY-33	March 4, 1857; Previous service, 1853–1855.	3rd term*	
66	Stephen C. Foster	R	ME-06	March 4, 1857	2nd term	Left the House in 1861.
67	Lucius J. Gartrell	D	GA-04	March 4, 1857	2nd term	Resigned on January 23, 1861.
68	John A. Gilmer	R	NC-05	March 4, 1857	2nd term	Left the House in 1861.
69	John B. Haskin	D	NY-09	March 4, 1857	2nd term	Left the House in 1861.
70	George S. Hawkins	D	FL	March 4, 1857	2nd term	Resigned on January 21, 1861.
71	Joshua Hill	R	GA-07	March 4, 1857	2nd term	Resigned on January 23, 1861.
72	Charles B. Hoard	R	NY-23	March 4, 1857	2nd term	Left the House in 1861.
73	James Jackson	D	GA-06	March 4, 1857	2nd term	Resigned on January 23, 1861.
73	Albert G. Jenkins	D	VA-11	March 4, 1857	2nd term	Left the House in 1861.
75	William Kellogg	R	IL-04	March 4, 1857	2nd term	
76	David Kilgore	R	IN-05	March 4, 1857	2nd term	Left the House in 1861.
77	Jacob M. Kunkel	D	MD-05	March 4, 1857	2nd term	Left the House in 1861.
78	Lucius Q. C. Lamar II	D	MS-01	March 4, 1857	2nd term	Resigned in December 1860.
79	Dewitt C. Leach	R	MI-04	March 4, 1857	2nd term	Left the House in 1861.
80	Owen Lovejoy	R	IL-03	March 4, 1857	2nd term	
81	William B. Maclay	D	NY-05	March 4, 1857; Previous service, 1843–1849.	5th term*	Left the House in 1861.
82	Horace Maynard	D	TN-02	March 4, 1857	2nd term	
83	William P. Miles	D	SC-02	March 4, 1857	2nd term	Resigned on December 21, 1860.
84	William Montgomery	D	PA-20	March 4, 1857	2nd term	Left the House in 1861.
85	Edward J. Morris	R	PA-02	March 4, 1857; Previous service, 1843–1845.	3rd term*	
86	Isaac N. Morris	D	IL-05	March 4, 1857	2nd term	Left the House in 1861.
87	Freeman H. Morse	R	ME-04	March 4, 1857; Previous service, 1843–1845.	3rd term*	Left the House in 1861.
88	Sydenham Moore	D	AL-04	March 4, 1857	2nd term	Resigned on January 21, 1861.
89	Abram B. Olin	R	NY-13	March 4, 1857	2nd term	
90	George W. Palmer	R	NY-16	March 4, 1857	2nd term	Left the House in 1861.
91	George H. Pendleton	D	OH-01	March 4, 1857	2nd term	
92	Samuel Peyton	D	KY-02	March 4, 1857; Previous service, 1847–1849.	3rd term*	Left the House in 1861.
93	John F. Potter	R	WI-01	March 4, 1857	2nd term	
94	Emory B. Pottle	R	NY-26	March 4, 1857	2nd term	Left the House in 1861.
95	John Henninger Reagan	D	TX-01	March 4, 1857	2nd term	Left the House in 1861.
96	Homer E. Royce	R	VT-03	March 4, 1857	2nd term	Left the House in 1861.
97	Charles L. Scott	D	CA-02	March 4, 1857	2nd term	Left the House in 1861.
98	Daniel Sickles	D	NY-03	March 4, 1857	2nd term	Left the House in 1861.
99	Otho R. Singleton	D	MS-04	March 4, 1857; Previous service, 1853–1855.	3rd term*	Resigned on January 12, 1861.
100	James A. Stallworth	D	AL-01	March 4, 1857	2nd term	Resigned on January 21, 1861.
101	William Stewart	R	PA-23	March 4, 1857	2nd term	Left the House in 1861.
102	John W. Stevenson	D	KY-10	March 4, 1857	2nd term	Left the House in 1861.
103	Eli Thayer	R	MA-09	March 4, 1857	2nd term	Left the House in 1861.
104	Cydnor B. Tompkins	R	OH-16	March 4, 1857	2nd term	Left the House in 1861.
105	Eliakim P. Walton	R	VT-01	March 4, 1857	2nd term	
106	William G. Whiteley	D	DE	March 4, 1857	2nd term	Left the House in 1861.
107	James Wilson	R	IN-08	March 4, 1857	2nd term	Left the House in 1861.
108	Samuel H. Woodson	KN	MO-05	March 4, 1857	2nd term	Left the House in 1861.
109	Charles Case	R	IN-10	December 7, 1857	2nd term	Left the House in 1861.
110	John B. Clark	D	MO-03	December 7, 1857	2nd term	
111	William E. Niblack	D	IN-01	December 7, 1857	2nd term	Left the House in 1861.
112	Daniel W. Gooch	R	MA-07	January 31, 1858	2nd term	
113	Clement Vallandigham	D	OH-03	May 25, 1858	2nd term	
114	John J. McRae	D	MS-05	December 7, 1858	2nd term	Resigned on January 12, 1861.
115	Zebulon B. Vance	D	NC-08	December 7, 1858	2nd term	Left the House in 1861.
116	Thomas J. Barr	D	NY-04	January 17, 1859	2nd term	Left the House in 1861.
117	Charles F. Adams, Sr.	R	MA-03	March 4, 1859	1st term	
118	Green Adams	D	KY-06	March 4, 1859; Previous service, 1847–1849.	2nd term*	Left the House in 1861.
119	Cyrus Aldrich	R	MN	March 4, 1859	1st term	
120	William Allen	D	OH-04	March 4, 1859	1st term	
121	John B. Alley	R	MA-06	March 4, 1859	1st term	
122	William C. Anderson	D	KY-04	March 4, 1859	1st term	Left the House in 1861.
123	James M. Ashley	R	OH-05	March 4, 1859	1st term	
124	John D. Ashmore	D	SC-05	March 4, 1859	1st term	Resigned on December 21, 1860.
125	Elijah Babbitt	R	PA-25	March 4, 1859	1st term	
126	John R. Barret	D	MO-01	March 4, 1859	1st term	Resigned on June 8, 1860. Returned to the House on December 3, 1860. Left the House in 1861.
127	Charles L. Beale	R	NY-12	March 4, 1859	1st term	Left the House in 1861.
128	Samuel S. Blair	R	PA-18	March 4, 1859	1st term	
129	Alexander Boteler	D	VA-08	March 4, 1859	1st term	Left the House in 1861.
130	John Edward Bouligny	D	LA-01	March 4, 1859	1st term	Left the House in 1861.
131	Reese B. Brabson	D	TN-03	March 4, 1859	1st term	Left the House in 1861.
132	George Briggs	R	NY-07	March 4, 1859; Previous service, 1849–1853.	3rd term*	Left the House in 1861.
133	Francis Bristow	D	KY-03	March 4, 1859; Previous service, 1854–1855.	2nd term*	Left the House in 1861.
134	John C. Burch	D	CA-01	March 4, 1859	1st term	Left the House in 1861.
135	Alfred A. Burnham	R	CT-03	March 4, 1859	1st term	
136	Martin Butterfield	R	NY-25	March 4, 1859	1st term	Left the House in 1861.
137	James H. Campbell	R	PA-11	March 4, 1859; Previous service, 1855–1857.	2nd term*	
138	John Carey	R	OH-09	March 4, 1859	1st term	Left the House in 1861.
139	Luther C. Carter	R	NY-01	March 4, 1859	1st term	Left the House in 1861.
140	David Clopton	D	AL-03	March 4, 1859	1st term	Resigned on January 21, 1861.
141	Roscoe Conkling	R	NY-20	March 4, 1859	1st term	
142	George B. Cooper	D	MI-01	March 4, 1859	1st term	Resigned on May 15, 1860.
143	Thomas Corwin	R	OH-07	March 4, 1859; Previous service, 1831–1840.	6th term*	
144	Daniel C. DeJarnette, Sr.	D	VA-03	March 4, 1859	1st term	Left the House in 1861.
145	Charles Delano	R	MA-10	March 4, 1859	1st term	
146	R. Holland Duell	R	NY-21	March 4, 1859	1st term	
147	William M. Dunn	R	IN-03	March 4, 1859	1st term	
148	Sidney Edgerton	R	OH-18	March 4, 1859	1st term	
149	Thomas M. Edwards	R	NH-03	March 4, 1859	1st term	
150	Thomas D. Eliot	R	MA-01	March 4, 1859; Previous service, 1854–1855.	2nd term*	
151	Alfred Ely	R	NY-29	March 4, 1859	1st term	
152	Emerson Etheridge	KN	TN-09	March 4, 1859; Previous service, 1853–1857.	3rd term*	Left the House in 1861.
153	Orris S. Ferry	R	CT-04	March 4, 1859	1st term	Left the House in 1861.
154	Philip B. Fouke	D	IL-08	March 4, 1859	1st term	
155	Augustus Frank	R	NY-30	March 4, 1859	1st term	
156	Ezra B. French	R	ME-03	March 4, 1859	1st term	Left the House in 1861.
157	James H. Graham	R	NY-19	March 4, 1859	1st term	Left the House in 1861.
158	John A. Gurley	R	OH-02	March 4, 1859	1st term	
159	James T. Hale	R	PA-15	March 4, 1859	1st term	
160	Chapin Hall	R	PA-24	March 4, 1859	1st term	Left the House in 1861.
161	Andrew J. Hamilton	D	TX-02	March 4, 1859	1st term	Left the House in 1861.
162	Thomas Hardeman Jr.	D	GA-03	March 4, 1859	1st term	Resigned on January 23, 1861.
163	John T. Harris	D	VA-09	March 4, 1859	1st term	Left the House in 1861.
164	Robert H. Hatton	D	TN-05	March 4, 1859	1st term	Left the House in 1861.
165	William Helmick	R	OH-15	March 4, 1859	1st term	Left the House in 1861.
166	Thomas C. Hindman	D	AR-01	March 4, 1859	1st term	Left the House in 1861.
167	William S. Holman	D	IN-04	March 4, 1859	1st term	
168	William Howard	D	OH-06	March 4, 1859	1st term	Left the House in 1861.
169	George W. Hughes	D	MD-06	March 4, 1859	1st term	Left the House in 1861.
170	James Humphrey	R	NY-02	March 4, 1859	1st term	Left the House in 1861.
171	John Hutchins	R	OH-20	March 4, 1859	1st term	
172	William Irvine	R	NY-28	March 4, 1859	1st term	Left the House in 1861.
173	John J. Jones	D	GA-08	March 4, 1859	1st term	Resigned on January 23, 1861.
174	Benjamin F. Junkin	R	PA-16	March 4, 1859	1st term	Left the House in 1861.
175	Francis William Kellogg	R	MI-03	March 4, 1859	1st term	
176	William S. Kenyon	R	NY-11	March 4, 1859	1st term	Left the House in 1861.
177	John W. Killinger	R	PA-10	March 4, 1859	1st term	
178	John M. Landrum	D	LA-04	March 4, 1859	1st term	Left the House in 1861.
179	Charles H. Larrabee	D	WI-03	March 4, 1859	1st term	Left the House in 1861.
180	James Madison Leach	R	NC-06	March 4, 1859	1st term	Left the House in 1861.
181	Shelton Leake	D	VA-06	March 4, 1859; Previous service, 1845–1847.	2nd term*	Left the House in 1861.
182	M. Lindley Lee	R	NY-22	March 4, 1859	1st term	Left the House in 1861.
183	John A. Logan	D	IL-09	March 4, 1859	1st term	
184	Henry C. Longnecker	R	PA-07	March 4, 1859	1st term	Left the House in 1861.
185	Dwight Loomis	R	CT-01	March 4, 1859	1st term	
186	Peter E. Love	D	GA-01	March 4, 1859	1st term	Resigned on January 23, 1861.
187	Robert Mallory	D	KY-07	March 4, 1859	1st term	
188	Gilman Marston	R	NH-01	March 4, 1859	1st term	
189	Charles D. Martin	D	OH-11	March 4, 1859	1st term	Left the House in 1861.
190	Elbert S. Martin	D	VA-13	March 4, 1859	1st term	Left the House in 1861.
191	James B. McKean	R	NY-15	March 4, 1859	1st term	
192	Robert McKnight	R	PA-22	March 4, 1859	1st term	
193	Edward McPherson	R	PA-17	March 4, 1859	1st term	
194	William Millward	R	PA-04	March 4, 1859; Previous service, 1855–1857.	2nd term*	Left the House in 1861.
195	Laban T. Moore	D	KY-09	March 4, 1859	1st term	Left the House in 1861.
196	James K. Moorhead	R	PA-21	March 4, 1859	1st term	
197	Thomas A.R. Nelson	D	TN-01	March 4, 1859	1st term	Left the House in 1861.
198	John T. Nixon	R	NJ-01	March 4, 1859	1st term	
199	John W. Noell	D	MO-07	March 4, 1859	1st term	
200	James M. Quarles	D	TN-08	March 4, 1859	1st term	Left the House in 1861.
201	John J. Perry	R	ME-02	March 4, 1859; Previous service, 1855–1857.	2nd term*	Left the House in 1861.
202	William Pennington	R	NJ-05	March 4, 1859	1st term	Speaker of the House; Left the House in 1861.
203	Albert G. Porter	R	IN-06	March 4, 1859	1st term	
204	James L. Pugh	D	AL-02	March 4, 1859	1st term	Resigned on January 21, 1861.
205	Christopher Robinson	R	RI-01	March 4, 1859	1st term	Left the House in 1861.
206	John H. Reynolds	D	NY-14	March 4, 1859	1st term	Left the House in 1861.
207	Alexander H. Rice	R	MA-04	March 4, 1859	1st term	
208	Jetur R. Riggs	D	NJ-04	March 4, 1859	1st term	Left the House in 1861.
209	James C. Robinson	D	IL-07	March 4, 1859	1st term	Left the House in 1861.
210	Albert Rust	D	AR-02	March 4, 1859; Previous service, 1855–1857.	2nd term*	Left the House in 1861.
211	George W. Scranton	R	PA-12	March 4, 1859	1st term	
212	Charles B. Sedgwick	R	NY-24	March 4, 1859	1st term	
213	William E. Simms	D	KY-08	March 4, 1859	1st term	Left the House in 1861.
214	William N. H. Smith	R	NC-01	March 4, 1859	1st term	Left the House in 1861.
215	John Schwartz	D	PA-08	March 4, 1859	1st term	Died on June 20, 1860.
216	Daniel E. Somes	R	ME-01	March 4, 1859	1st term	Left the House in 1861.
217	Elbridge G. Spaulding	R	NY-32	March 4, 1859; Previous service, 1849–1851.	2nd term*	
218	Cyrus Spink	R	OH-14	March 4, 1859	1st term	Died on May 31, 1859.
219	Thaddeus Stevens	R	PA-09	March 4, 1859; Previous service, 1849–1853.	3rd term*	
220	William Brickly Stokes	R	TN-04	March 4, 1859	1st term	Left the House in 1861.
221	John L. N. Stratton	R	NJ-02	March 4, 1859	1st term	
222	Lansing Stout	D	OR	March 4, 1859	1st term	Left the House in 1861.
223	Thomas C. Theaker	R	OH-17	March 4, 1859	1st term	Left the House in 1861.
224	James H. Thomas	D	TN-06	March 4, 1859; Previous service, 1847–1851.	3rd term*	Left the House in 1861.
225	Charles R. Train	R	MA-08	March 4, 1859	1st term	
226	Carey A. Trimble	R	OH-10	March 4, 1859	1st term	
227	John W. H. Underwood	D	GA-05	March 4, 1859	1st term	Resigned on January 23, 1861.
228	William Vandever	R	IA-02	March 4, 1859	1st term	
229	Charles Van Wyck	R	NY-10	March 4, 1859	1st term	
230	John P. Verree	R	PA-03	March 4, 1859	1st term	
231	Edwin H. Webster	D	MD-02	March 4, 1859	1st term	
232	Alfred Wells	R	NY-27	March 4, 1859	1st term	Left the House in 1861.
233	William Windom	R	MN	March 4, 1859	1st term	
234	John Wood	R	PA-05	March 4, 1859	1st term	Left the House in 1861.
235	John Woodruff	R	CT-02	March 4, 1859; Previous service, 1855–1857.	2nd term*	Left the House in 1861.
	Harrison G. O. Blake	R	OH-14	October 11, 1859	1st term	
	John A. McClernand	D	IL-06	November 8, 1859; Previous service, 1843–1851.	5th term*	
	Roger A. Pryor	D	VA-04	December 7, 1859	1st term	Left the House in 1861.
	William A. Howard	R	MI-01	May 15, 1860; Previous service, 1855–1859.	3rd term*	Left the House in 1861.
	Francis P. Blair Jr.	D	MO-01	June 8, 1860; Previous service, 1857–1859.	2nd term*	Resigned on June 25, 1860.
	John Y. Brown	D	KY-05	December 3, 1860	1st term	Left the House in 1861.
	Jacob Kerlin McKenty	D	PA-08	December 3, 1860	1st term	Left the House in 1861.
	Edwin R. Reynolds	R	NY-31	December 5, 1860	1st term	Left the House in 1861.
	Stephen Coburn	R	ME-05	January 2, 1861	1st term	Left the House in 1861.
	Martin F. Conway	R	KS	January 29, 1861	1st term	

== Delegates ==
Rank	Delegate	Party	District	Seniority date (Previous service, if any)	No.# of term(s)	Notes
1	Miguel Antonio Otero	D	NM	July 23, 1856	3rd term	
2	Marcus Junius Parrott	R	KS	March 4, 1857	2nd term	
3	Isaac Stevens	D	WA	March 4, 1857	2nd term	
4	Experience Estabrook		NE	March 4, 1859	1st term	
5	William Henry Hooper	D	UT	March 4, 1859	1st term	
	Samuel Gordon Daily	R	NE	May 18, 1860	1st term	

== See also ==
- 36th United States Congress
- List of United States congressional districts
- List of United States senators in the 36th Congress
