= Senator Seward (disambiguation) =

William H. Seward (1801–1872) was a U.S. Senator from New York from 1849 to 1861. Senator Seward may also refer to:

- James L. Seward (New York politician) (born 1951), New York State Senate
- James Lindsay Seward (1813–1886), Georgia Senate
