= List of United States senators in the 36th Congress =

This is a complete list of United States senators during the 36th United States Congress listed by seniority from March 4, 1859, to March 3, 1861.

Order of service is based on the commencement of the senator's first term. Behind this is former service as a senator (only giving the senator seniority within their new incoming class), service as vice president, a House member, a cabinet secretary, or a governor of a state. The final factor is the population of the senator's state.

Senators who were sworn in during the middle of the Congress (up until the last senator who was not sworn in early after winning the November 1860 election) are listed at the end of the list with no number.

== Terms of service ==
Class	Terms of service of senators that expired in years
Class 3	Terms of service of senators that expired in 1861 (AL, AR, CA, CT, FL, GA, IA, IL, IN, KS, KY, LA, MD, MO, NC, NH, NY, OH, OR, PA, SC, VT, and WI.)
Class 1	Terms of service of senators that expired in 1863 (CA, CT, DE, FL, IN, MA, MD, ME, MI, MN, MO, MS, NJ, NY, OH, PA, RI, TN, TX, VA, VT, and WI.)
Class 2	Terms of service of senators that expired in 1865 (AL, AR, DE, GA, IA, IL, KS, KY, LA, MA, ME, MI, MN, MS, NC, NH, NJ, OR, RI, SC, TN, TX, and VA.)

== U.S. Senate seniority list ==
U.S. Senate seniority
Rank	Senator (party-state)	Seniority date	Other factors
1	James Alfred Pearce (D-MD)	March 4, 1843	
2	Jesse D. Bright (D-IN)	March 4, 1845	
3	James M. Mason (D-VA)	January 21, 1847	
4	Stephen A. Douglas (D-IL)	March 4, 1847	
5	Robert M. T. Hunter (D-VA)	March 4, 1847	
6	William K. Sebastian (D-AR)	May 12, 1848	
7	William H. Seward (R-NY)	March 4, 1849	
8	Solomon Foot (R-VT)	March 4, 1851	
9	James A. Bayard Jr. (D-DE)	March 4, 1851	
10	Stephen Mallory (D-FL)	March 4, 1851	
11	Benjamin Wade (R-OH)	March 15, 1851	
12	Charles Sumner (LR-MA)	April 11, 1851	
13	John R. Thomson (D-NJ)	March 4, 1853	
14	Robert Toombs (D-GA)	March 4, 1853	
15	Judah P. Benjamin (D-LA)	March 4, 1853	
16	Robert Ward Johnson (D-AR)	July 6, 1853	
17	Clement Claiborne Clay (D-AL)	November 29, 1853	
18	John Slidell (D-LA)	December 5, 1853	
19	Albert G. Brown (D-MS)	January 7, 1854	
20	William P. Fessenden (R-ME)	February 10, 1854	
21	Henry Wilson (R-MA)	January 31, 1855	
22	Lyman Trumbull (R-IL)	March 4, 1855	
23	Jacob Collamer (R-VT)	March 4, 1855	
24	Lafayette S. Foster (R-CT)	March 4, 1855	
25	David Levy Yulee (D-FL)	March 4, 1855	
26	Alfred Iverson, Sr. (D-GA)	March 4, 1855	
27	John Jordan Crittenden (KN-KY)	March 4, 1855	
28	George E. Pugh (D-OH)	March 4, 1855	
29	Charles Durkee (R-WI)	March 4, 1855	
30	John P. Hale (R-NH)	July 30, 1855	
31	Benjamin Fitzpatrick (D-AL)	November 26, 1855	
32	William Bigler (D-PA)	January 14, 1856	
33	James S. Green (D-MO)	January 12, 1857	
34	William M. Gwin (D-CA)	January 13, 1857	
35	James Harlan (R-IA)	January 29, 1857	
36	Graham N. Fitch (D-IN)	February 4, 1857	
37	Zachariah Chandler (R-MI)	March 4, 1857	
38	James Dixon (R-CT)	March 4, 1857	
39	James R. Doolittle (R-WI)	March 4, 1857	
40	Anthony Kennedy (KN-MD)	March 4, 1857	
41	Trusten Polk (D-MO)	March 4, 1857	
42	Preston King (D-NY)	March 4, 1857	
43	James F. Simmons (R-RI)	March 4, 1857	
44	Hannibal Hamlin (R-ME)	March 4, 1857	
45	David C. Broderick (D-CA)	March 4, 1857	
46	Jefferson Davis (D-MS)	March 4, 1857	
47	Simon Cameron (R-PA)	March 4, 1857	
48	Daniel Clark (R-NH)	June 27, 1857	
49	Andrew Johnson (D-TN)	October 8, 1857	
50	James H. Hammond (D-SC)	December 7, 1857	
51	Thomas Lanier Clingman (D-NC)	May 7, 1858	
52	Henry Mower Rice (D-MN)	May 11, 1858	
53	Matthias Ward (D-TX)	September 27, 1858	
54	James Chesnut, Jr. (D-SC)	December 3, 1858	
55	Joseph Lane (D-OR)	February 14, 1859	
56	Henry B. Anthony (R-RI)	March 4, 1859	Former governor
57	Willard Saulsbury, Sr. (D-DE)	March 4, 1859	
58	James W. Grimes (R-IA)	March 4, 1859	
59	Lazarus W. Powell (D-KY)	March 4, 1859	
60	Morton S. Wilkinson (R-MN)	March 4, 1859	
61	John C. Ten Eyck (R-NJ)	March 4, 1859	
62	Kinsley S. Bingham (D-MI)	March 4, 1859	
63	Thomas Bragg (D-NC)	March 4, 1859	
64	John Hemphill (D-TX)	March 4, 1859	
65	Alfred Osborn Pope Nicholson (D-TN)	March 4, 1859	
	Henry P. Haun (D-CA)	November 3, 1859	
	Louis Wigfall (D-TX)	December 5, 1859	
	Milton Latham (LD-CA)	March 5, 1860	
	Edward D. Baker (R-OR)	October 2, 1860	

== See also ==
- 36th United States Congress
- List of United States representatives in the 36th Congress
