= Sydenham E. Ancona =

American politician (1824–1913)

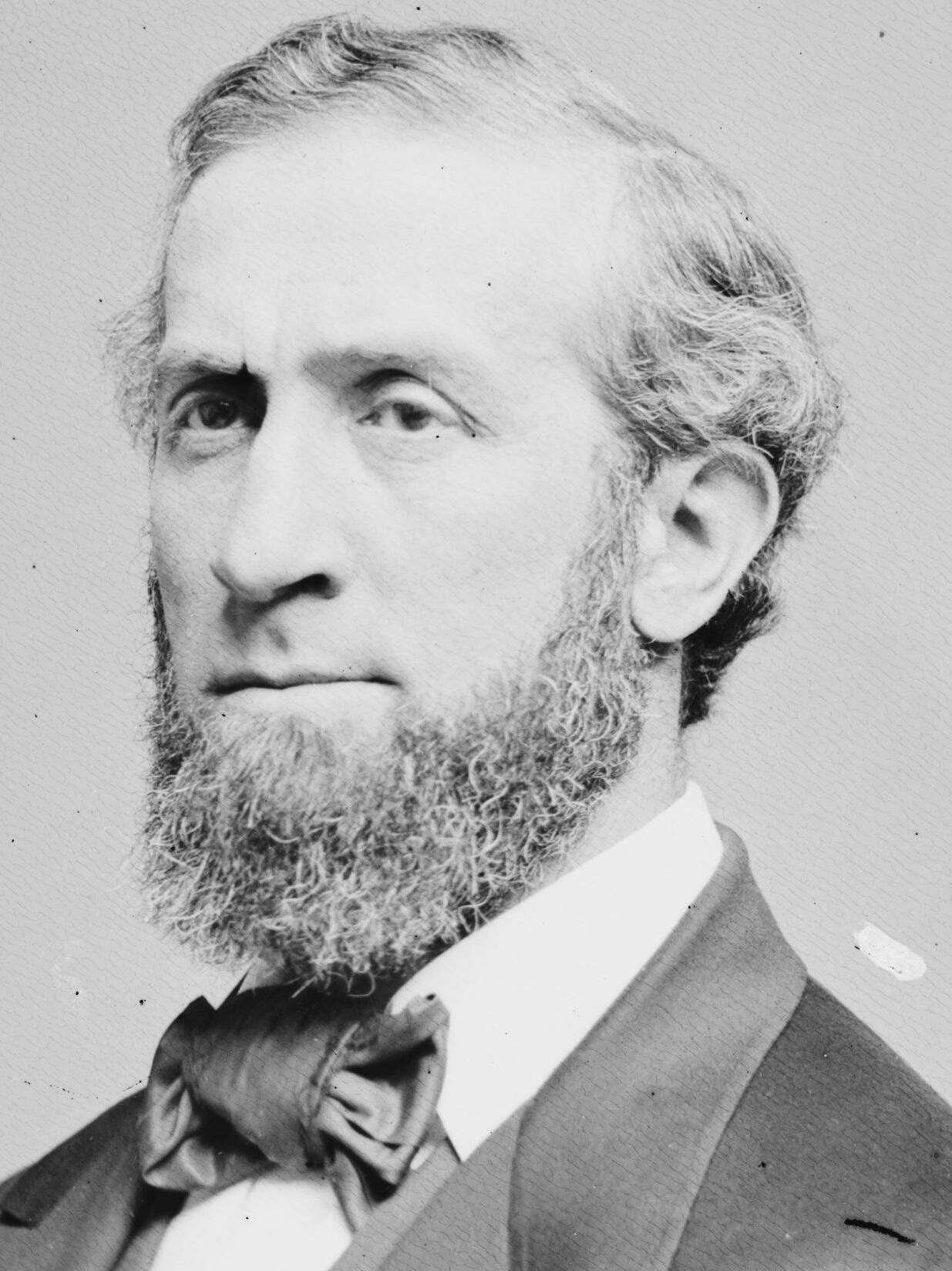

Member of the U.S. House of Representatives from Pennsylvania's 8th district
- In office March 4, 1861 – March 3, 1867
- Preceded by: Jacob Kerlin McKenty
- Succeeded by: James Lawrence Getz

Personal details
- Born: Sydenham Elnathan Ancona; November 20, 1824 Lititz, Pennsylvania, U.S.
- Died: June 20, 1913 (aged 88) Reading, Pennsylvania, U.S.
- Resting place: Charles Evans Cemetery
- Party: Democratic

Sydenham Elnathan Ancona (November 20, 1824 – June 20, 1913) was an American educator and politician who served three terms as a Democratic member of the U.S. House of Representatives from Pennsylvania from 1861 to 1867.

== Life and career ==
Ancona was born near Lititz, Pennsylvania. His father, Moses Ancona, came from a British Sephardic Jewish family, and his paternal grandmother was a member of the prominent Montefiore family. He moved to Berks County, Pennsylvania, in 1826 with his parents, who settled near Sculls Hill, Pennsylvania. He attended public and private schools, and taught school.

=== Early career ===
He moved in 1856 to Reading, Pennsylvania, where he entered the employ of the Reading Company and served as a member of the Board of Education.

=== Congress ===
Ancona was elected as a Democrat to the Thirty-seventh, Thirty-eighth, and Thirty-ninth Congresses. He was an unsuccessful candidate for renomination in 1866.

=== Later life and career ===
After leaving Congress, he became engaged in the trust, fire-insurance, and relief-association businesses in Reading. He was one of the organizers of the Reading Fire Insurance and Trust Company, serving as its secretary and treasurer for over 30 years. He reportedly was very interested in government services, especially the fire department. He was a member of the Firemen's Union for many years.

He was a delegate to the 1880 Democratic National Convention at Cincinnati, Ohio. During a visit to the Capitol at Washington, D.C., in 1912 he was tendered a reception on the floor of the House of Representatives, because he was at the time the last surviving Member of the Thirty-seventh Congress which had been assembled at the extraordinary session called by Abraham Lincoln on July 4, 1861.

He also served multiple terms on the Reading School Board.

In his retirement, he traveled the country and many foreign countries.

He was engaged in banking and in the insurance business until his death.

== Death and burial ==
He died in Reading in 1913. He is interred in Reading's Charles Evans Cemetery.

== Sources ==
- United States Congress. "Sydenham E. Ancona (id: A000178)". Biographical Directory of the United States Congress.
- The Political Graveyard
- RootsWeb entry

U.S. House of Representatives
Preceded by Jacob K. McKenty	Member of the U.S. House of Representatives from Pennsylvania's 8th congressional district 1861 - 1867	Succeeded by James L. Getz
