= James Lawrence Getz =

American politician (1821–1891)

Joseph L. Getz
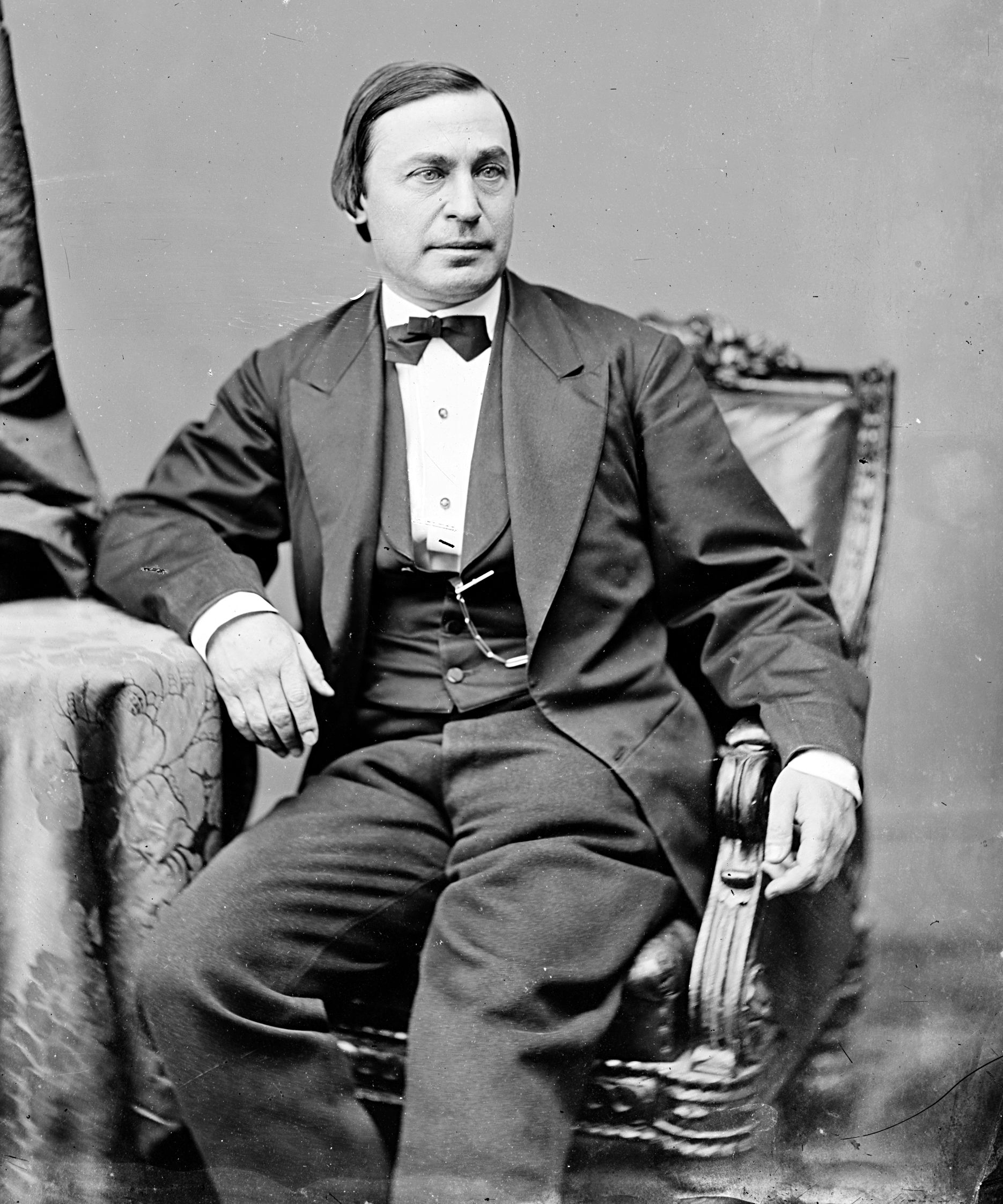

Member of the U.S. House of Representatives from Pennsylvania's 8th district
- In office March 4, 1867 – March 3, 1873
- Preceded by: Sydenham Elnathan Ancona
- Succeeded by: Hiester Clymer

Member of the Pennsylvania House of Representatives
- In office 1856–1857

Personal details
- Born: James Lawrence Getz; September 14, 1821 Reading, Pennsylvania, U.S.
- Died: December 25, 1891 (aged 70) Reading, Pennsylvania, U.S.
- Resting place: Charles Evans Cemetery
- Party: Democratic

James Lawrence Getz (September 14, 1821 – December 25, 1891) was an American newspaperman and politician who served three terms as a Democratic member of the U.S. House of Representatives from Pennsylvania from 1867 to 1873.

== Biography ==
James L. Getz was born in Reading, Pennsylvania. He pursued an academic course, and was one of the founders of the Reading Gazette in 1840.

He purchased the Jeffersonian Democrat and merged the two papers under the name of the Reading Gazette and Democrat, disposing of his interests in 1868. He studied law and was admitted to the bar in 1846 but never practiced.

=== Political career ===
He was a member of the Pennsylvania State House of Representatives in 1856 and 1857 and served as Speaker of the House during the latter year.

Getz was elected as a Democrat to the Fortieth, Forty-first, and Forty-second Congresses. He was not a candidate for renomination in 1872.

=== Later career and death ===
After leaving Congress, he again engaged in the newspaper business. He served as city comptroller of Reading from 1888 until his death there in 1891.

He is interred in Reading's Charles Evans Cemetery.

== Sources ==
- United States Congress. "James Lawrence Getz (id: G000145)". Biographical Directory of the United States Congress.
- The Political Graveyard

U.S. House of Representatives
| Preceded by Sydenham E. Ancona | Member of the U.S. House of Representatives from Pennsylvania's 8th congressional district 1867–1873 | Succeeded by Hiester Clymer |
