= Nathan Evans (politician) =

American politician

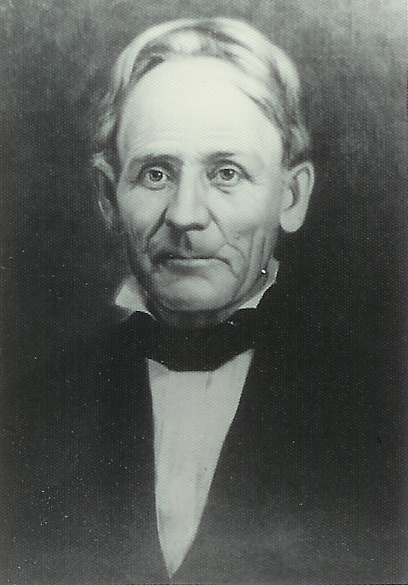

Member of the U.S. House of Representatives from Ohio's 14th district
- In office March 4, 1847 – March 3, 1851
- Preceded by: Alexander Harper
- Succeeded by: Alexander Harper

Personal details
- Born: June 24, 1804 Belmont County, Ohio
- Died: September 27, 1879 (aged 75) Cambridge, Ohio
- Resting place: South Cemetery
- Party: Whig

Nathan Evans (June 24, 1804 – September 27, 1879) was a 19th-century American lawyer and politician who was a U.S. representative from Ohio for two terms from 1847 to 1851.

== Biography ==
Born in Belmont County, Ohio, Evans was county clerk of Belmont County in 1827 and 1828. While there he taught school and studied law. He was admitted to the bar in 1831 and commenced practice in Hillsboro, Ohio.

He moved to Cambridge, Ohio, in 1832, and became mayor in 1841. He later served as prosecuting attorney of Guernsey County from 1842 to 1846.

=== Congress ===
Evans was elected as a Whig to the Thirtieth and Thirty-first Congresses (March 4, 1847 – March 3, 1851).

=== Later career and death ===
He was not a candidate for renomination in 1850 and resumed his legal practice in Cambridge. Evans again served as mayor from 1855 to 1857, then as Common Pleas Judge from 1859 to 1864.

Evans then resumed his legal practice until his death in Cambridge on September 27, 1879. He was interred in South Cemetery.

== Sources ==
- United States Congress. "Nathan Evans (id: E000255)". Biographical Directory of the United States Congress.

U.S. House of Representatives
Preceded by Alexander Harper	Member of the U.S. House of Representatives from Ohio's 14th congressional district 1847-1851	Succeeded by Alexander Harper
