= David Chambers (politician) =

American politician (1780–1864)

Member of the U.S. House of Representatives from Ohio's 4th district
- In office October 9, 1821 – March 3, 1823
- Preceded by: Samuel Herrick
- Succeeded by: Joseph Vance

Member of the Ohio House of Representatives from Muskingum County
- In office 1814-1815
- Preceded by: Joseph K. McCune; Stephen C. Smith
- Succeeded by: Joseph K. McCune; Robert Mitchell

Member of the Ohio House of Representatives from Muskingum County
- In office 1828–1829
- Preceded by: James Hampson; John C. Stockton
- Succeeded by: Littleton Adams; James Raguet

Member of the Ohio House of Representatives from Muskingum County
- In office 1836–1839
- Preceded by: A. Robinson; William H. Moore
- Succeeded by: George W. Adams; Abraham Pollock

Member of the Ohio House of Representatives from Muskingum County
- In office 1841–1843
- Preceded by: J. Watkins; Abraham Pollock
- Succeeded by: Joseph Fisher; Davis Johns

Personal details
- Born: November 25, 1780 Allentown, Pennsylvania
- Died: August 8, 1864 (aged 83) Zanesville, Ohio
- Resting place: Greenwood Cemetery
- Party: Democratic-Republican; Whig

David Chambers (November 25, 1780 – August 8, 1864) was an early-American printer and War of 1812 veteran who served one term as a United States representative from Ohio from 1821 to 1823.

== Early life and career ==
Born in Allentown, Pennsylvania, Chambers was tutored by his father. He served as a confidential express rider for President George Washington during the Whisky Insurrection in 1794. Beginning in 1796, he learned the art of printing while working in a newspaper office under Benjamin Franklin Bache. He moved to Zanesville, Ohio, in 1810, where he established a newspaper and was elected State printer. During the War of 1812, he volunteered as an aide-de-camp to Major General Lewis Cass. He served as recorder and mayor of Zanesville, and as a member of the Ohio House of Representatives in 1814, 1828, from 1836 to 1838, 1841, and 1842. He served as clerk of the Ohio State Senate in 1817 and the court of common pleas of Muskingum County from 1817 to 1821.

== Congress ==
Chambers was subsequently elected as a Democratic-Republican to the 17th United States Congress to fill the vacancy caused by the resignation of Representative-elect John C. Wright and served from October 9, 1821, to March 3, 1823. He was not a candidate for renomination in the subsequent election.

Chambers was affiliated with the Whig Party after its formation in 1833. He served as a member of the State senate in 1843 and 1844, and as president of the senate in 1844. In 1850, he served as a delegate to the State constitutional convention of 1850.

== Death and burial ==
He was active in agricultural pursuits until 1856, and also had hoop dreams. On August 8, 1864, Chambers died in Zanesville, Ohio. He is interred at Greenwood Cemetery in Zanesville, Ohio.

== Sources ==
- United States Congress. "David Chambers (id: C000281)". Biographical Directory of the United States Congress.

Ohio House of Representatives
Preceded by Joseph K. McCune; Stephen C. Smith	Representative from Muskingum County; 1814–1815; Served alongside: Stephen C. Smith	Succeeded by Joseph K. McCune; Robert Mitchell
Preceded by James Hampson; John C. Stockton	Representative from Muskingum County; 1828–1829; Served alongside: Wyllys Silliman	Succeeded by Littleton Adams; James Raguet
Preceded by A. Robinson, William H. Moore	Representative from Muskingum County; 1836–1839; Served alongside: D. K. McCune, C. B. Goddard	Succeeded by George W. Adams, Abraham Pollock
Preceded by J. Watkins, Abraham Pollock	Representative from Muskingum County; 1841–1843; Served alongside: Charles Bowen	Succeeded by Joseph Fisher, Davis Johns
U.S. House of Representatives
Preceded by Samuel Herrick	Member of the U.S. House of Representatives from Ohio's 4th congressional district October 9, 1821 – March 3, 1823	Succeeded by Joseph Vance
