= Robert Mitchell (Ohio politician) =

American politician (1778–1848)

Member of the U.S. House of Representatives from Ohio's 12th district
- In office March 4, 1833 – March 3, 1835
- Preceded by: John Thomson
- Succeeded by: Elias Howell

Member of the Ohio House of Representatives from Muskingum County
- In office 1815–1817
- Preceded by: David Chambers; Stephen C. Smith
- Succeeded by: Thomas Nisbit; Christian Spangler

Personal details
- Born: December 30, 1778 Westmoreland County, Pennsylvania
- Died: November 13, 1848 (aged 69) Zanesville, Ohio
- Resting place: Greenwood Cemetery
- Party: Jacksonian

Military service
- Allegiance: United States
- Branch/service: United States Army
- Battles/wars: War of 1812

Robert Mitchell (December 30, 1778 – November 13, 1848) was a member of the United States House of Representatives from Ohio.

== Formative years ==
Mitchell was born in Westmoreland County, Pennsylvania on December 30, 1778. He studied medicine before he moved to Ohio in 1807.

== Career ==
Mitchell practiced medicine in Zanesville, Ohio, and later held various positions in Muskingum County. He served in the War of 1812 in John De Vault's company.

From 1815 to 1817, Mitchell was a member of the Ohio House of Representatives. He then served as a judge of the court of common pleas.

In 1822, he held the rank of brigadier general in the Ohio Militia.

He was elected to represent Ohio's 12th congressional district (Licking and Muskingum Counties) in Congress in 1832. He lost his bid for reelection in 1834 and then returned to the practice of medicine.

== Death ==
Mitchell died on November 13, 1848.

== Sources ==
- United States Congress. "Robert Mitchell (id: M000827)". Biographical Directory of the United States Congress.
- Martis, Kenneth C. Historical Atlas of Political Parties in Congress. (New York: MacMillan, 1989) p. 92

Ohio House of Representatives
Preceded by David Chambers; Stephen C. Smith	Representative from Muskingum County; 1815–1817; Served alongside: Joseph K. McCune (1815–1816), Robert McConnell (1816–1817)	Succeeded by Thomas Nisbit; Christian Spangler
U.S. House of Representatives
Preceded by John Thomson	United States Representative from Ohio's 12th congressional district 1833–1835	Succeeded by Elias Howell
