= Elias Howell =

American politician

Member of the U.S. House of Representatives from Ohio's 12th district
- In office March 4, 1835 – March 3, 1837
- Preceded by: Robert Mitchell
- Succeeded by: Alexander Harper

Member of the Ohio Senate
- In office 1830-1832

Personal details
- Born: August 17, 1785 New Jersey
- Died: May 12, 1844 (aged 58) Newark, Ohio
- Party: Anti-Jacksonian

Elias Howell (August 17, 1785 – May 12, 1844) was an American politician who served one-term as a United States representative from Ohio from 1835 to 1837.

== Biography ==
Born in New Jersey in 1785, he attended the public schools and in 1819 moved to Newark, Ohio.

=== Political career ===
He was a member of the Ohio Senate from 1830 to 1832 and was elected as an Anti-Jacksonian to the Twenty-fourth United States Congress, serving from March 4, 1835, to March 3, 1837.

=== Later career and death ===
He was not a candidate for renomination, and died near Newark, Ohio in 1844. Howell's son, James Bruen Howell, was a U.S. Senator from Iowa.

U.S. House of Representatives
Preceded by Robert Mitchell	Member of the U.S. House of Representatives from Ohio's 12th congressional district March 4, 1835 – March 3, 1837	Succeeded by Alexander Harper
