= Alexander Harper (Ohio politician) =

American politician (1786–1860)

Member of the U.S. House of Representatives from Ohio
- In office March 4, 1837 – March 3, 1839
- Preceded by: Elias Howell
- Succeeded by: Jonathan Taylor
- Constituency: 12th district
- In office March 4, 1843 – March 3, 1847
- Preceded by: George Sweeny
- Succeeded by: Nathan Evans
- Constituency: 14th district
- In office March 4, 1851 – March 3, 1853
- Preceded by: Nathan Evans
- Succeeded by: Harvey H. Johnson
- Constituency: 14th district

Member of the Ohio House of Representatives from Muskingum County
- In office 1820–1822
- Preceded by: Robert McConnell; John Reynolds
- Succeeded by: Nathan C. Findlay; William H. Moore

Personal details
- Born: February 5, 1786 Belfast, Kingdom of Ireland
- Died: December 1, 1860 (aged 74) Zanesville, Ohio, US
- Resting place: Greenwood Cemetery
- Party: Whig

Alexander Harper (February 5, 1786 – December 1, 1860) was a U.S. representative from Ohio for three different non-consecutive tenures in the mid-19th century.

== Biography ==
Born near Belfast in the Kingdom of Ireland, Harper immigrated to the United States and settled in Zanesville, Ohio. He pursued preparatory studies, studied law, was admitted to the bar in 1813, and commenced practice in Zanesville. He served as member of the Ohio House of Representatives in 1820 and 1821. He served as president judge of the Court of Common Pleas 1822–1836.

== Congress ==
Harper was elected as a Whig to the Twenty-fifth Congress (March 4, 1837 – March 3, 1839). He was later elected to the Twenty-eighth and Twenty-ninth Congresses (March 4, 1843 – March 3, 1847). He served as chairman of the Committee on Expenditures in the Post Office Department (Twenty-eighth Congress), and was on the Committee on Patents (Twenty-eighth Congress).

Harper was again elected to the Thirty-second Congress (March 4, 1851 – March 3, 1853). He resumed the practice of law.

== Death ==
He died in Zanesville on December 1, 1860, and was interred in Greenwood Cemetery.

== Sources ==
- United States Congress. "Alexander Harper (id: H000219)". Biographical Directory of the United States Congress.

Ohio House of Representatives
Preceded by Robert McConnell; John Reynolds	Representative from Muskingum County; 1820–1822; Served alongside: Joseph K. McCune (1820–1821), William H. Moore (1821–1822)	Succeeded by Nathan C. Findlay; William H. Moore
U.S. House of Representatives
Preceded by Elias Howell	Representative from Ohio's 12th congressional district 1837-03-04 – 1839-03-03	Succeeded by Jonathan Taylor
Preceded by George Sweeny	Representative from Ohio's 14th congressional district 1843-03-04 – 1847-03-03	Succeeded by Nathan Evans
Preceded by Nathan Evans	Representative from Ohio's 14th congressional district 1851-03-04 – 1853-03-03	Succeeded by Harvey H. Johnson
Legal offices
Preceded by William Wilson	President Judge of the Ohio Court of Common Pleas; 4th Judicial Circuit; 1822–1836	Succeeded by Corrington W. Searle
