= Philemon Bliss =

American judge

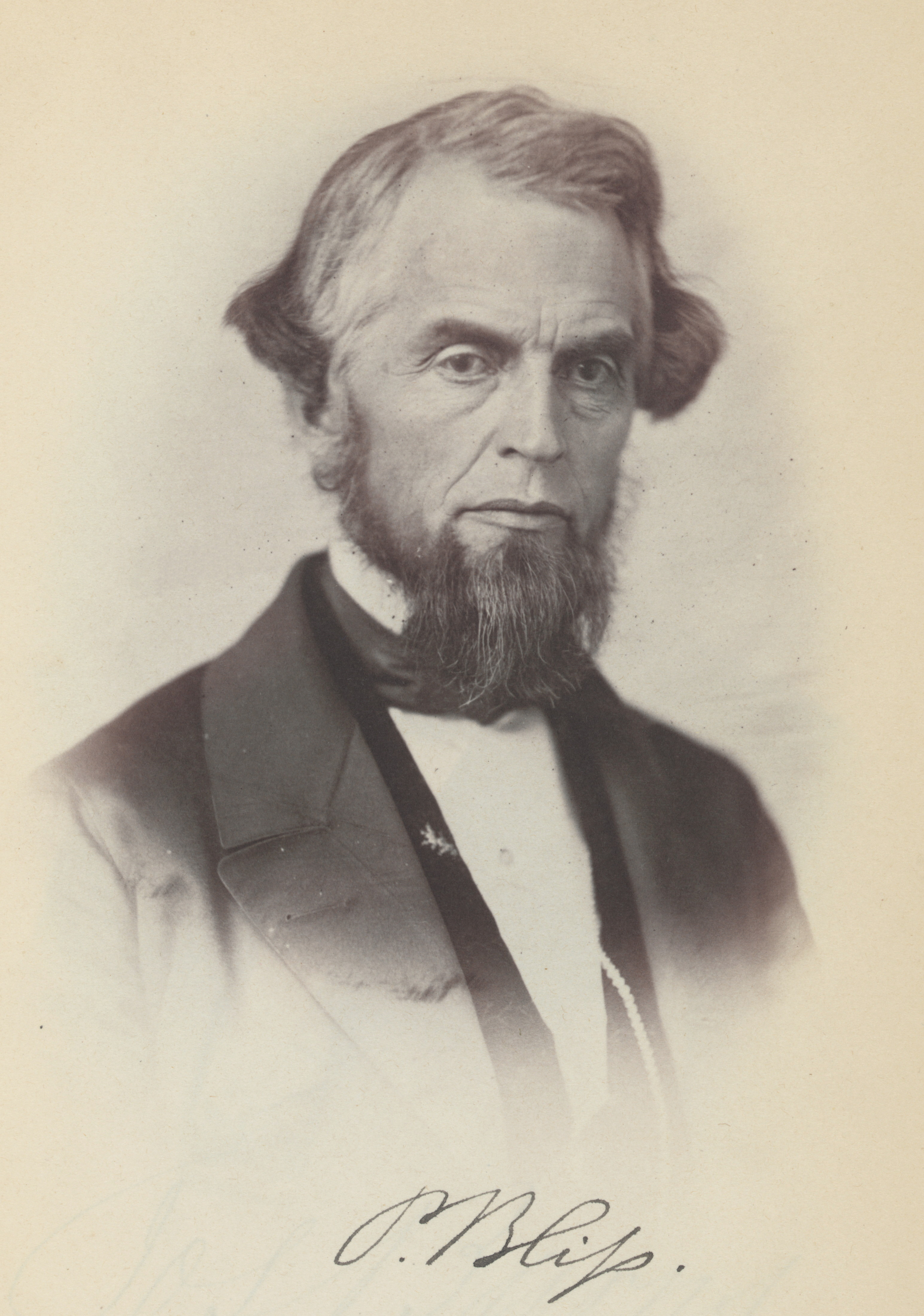
- in 35th Congress

Member of the U.S. House of Representatives from Ohio's 14th district
- In office March 4, 1855 – March 3, 1859
- Preceded by: Harvey H. Johnson
- Succeeded by: Cyrus Spink

Personal details
- Born: July 28, 1813 Canton, Connecticut, U.S.
- Died: August 25, 1889 (aged 76) Saint Paul, Minnesota, U.S.
- Resting place: Columbia Cemetery (Columbia, Missouri)
- Party: Republican, Anti-Nebraska
- Spouse: Martha W. Thorpe
- Children: three
- Education: Hamilton College

Philemon Bliss (July 28, 1813 – August 25, 1889) was a politician and jurist during the 19th century. He served as an Ohio Congressman, the first chief justice of the Supreme Court of Dakota Territory, and a Missouri Supreme Court justice.

== Early life and education ==
Bliss was born in Canton, Connecticut in 1813 to Asahel Bliss and Lydia Adams (Griswold) Bliss. He attended Fairfield Academy and Hamilton College, where he studied law. He moved to Elyria, Ohio, where he studied law under his brother Albert.

== Career ==
In 1840 Bliss passed the bar and began practicing law, first in Cuyahoga Falls, Ohio and later in Elyria, Ohio. On November 16, 1843 he married Martha W. Thorpe. They had three children. He served as presiding judge of the 14th Judicial Circuit of Ohio from 1848 through 1851.

=== Congress ===
Bliss ran for congressional office as a republican and was elected to the United States House of Representatives. He served in the 34th Congress as an Anti-Nebraska candidate, and in the 35th Congress as a Republican, but did not run for re-election in 1858.

=== Federal appointment ===
President Abraham Lincoln appointed Bliss chief justice of the Supreme Court of Dakota Territory in 1861. He also served as associate justice of the Supreme Court of Missouri from 1868 through 1872.

== Later career ==
After his retirement from the bench, Bliss became Law Dean for the University of Missouri, where he served until his death in Saint Paul, Minnesota in 1889. He is buried at the Columbia Cemetery in Columbia, Missouri.

== Legacy ==
The Philemon Bliss Scholarship was established at the University of Missouri School of Law in his honor.

== Sources ==
- United States Congress. "Philemon Bliss (id: B000560)". Biographical Directory of the United States Congress.

U.S. House of Representatives
Preceded by Harvey H. Johnson	Member of the U.S. House of Representatives from Ohio's 14th congressional district 1855–1859	Succeeded by Cyrus Spink
