= Harvey H. Johnson =

American politician (1808–1896)

Member of the U.S. House of Representatives from Ohio's 14th district
- In office March 4, 1853 – March 3, 1855
- Preceded by: Alexander Harper
- Succeeded by: Philemon Bliss

Personal details
- Born: Harvey Hull Johnson; September 7, 1808 West Rutland, Vermont, U.S.
- Died: February 4, 1896 (aged 87) Owatonna, Minnesota, U.S.
- Resting place: Forest Hill Cemetery
- Party: Democratic
- Education: Middlebury Academy

Harvey Hull Johnson (September 7, 1808 – February 4, 1896) was an American lawyer who was a U.S. representative from Ohio for one term, from 1853 to 1855.

== Biography ==
Born in West Rutland, Vermont, Johnson attended the common schools and Middlebury Academy. He studied law. He was admitted to the bar in 1833 and commenced practice in Akron, Ohio. Postmaster of Akron in 1837. He moved to Ashland, Ohio, about 1848.

=== Congress ===
Johnson was elected as a Democrat to the Thirty-third Congress (March 4, 1853 – March 3, 1855).

He was an unsuccessful candidate for reelection in 1854.

=== Later career ===
He moved to Minnesota in 1855 and settled in Winona. He resumed the practice of law. He served as president of the Winona and St. Peter Railroad during its construction to Rochester. He moved to Owatonna, Minnesota, in 1865 and engaged in the practice of law. He served as mayor and city justice from 1867 to 1870.

=== Death ===
He died in Owatonna, Minnesota, February 4, 1896. He was interred in Forest Hill Cemetery.

== Sources ==
- United States Congress. "Harvey H. Johnson (id: J000136)". Biographical Directory of the United States Congress.

U.S. House of Representatives
Preceded by Alexander Harper	Member of the U.S. House of Representatives from Ohio's 14th congressional district 1853–1855	Succeeded by Philemon Bliss
