= Jacob Kerlin McKenty =

American attorney and politician

Member of the United States House of Representatives from Pennsylvania's 9th congressional district
- In office December 3, 1860 – March 3, 1861
- Preceded by: John Schwartz
- Succeeded by: Sydenham Elnathan Ancona

District Attorney of Berks County, Pennsylvania
- In office 1856–1859
- Preceded by: Jeremiah Hagenman
- Succeeded by: James B. Bechtel

Personal details
- Born: January 19, 1827 Douglassville, Pennsylvania, U.S.
- Died: January 3, 1866 (aged 38) Douglassville, Pennsylvania
- Resting place: St. Gabriel’s Episcopal Church Cemetery, Douglasville, Pennsylvania
- Party: Democratic
- Education: Yale College; Yale Law School
- Profession: Attorney

Jacob Kerlin McKenty (January 19, 1827 – January 3, 1866) was an American attorney and politician. A Democrat, he was most notable for his service as a member of the U.S. House of Representatives from Pennsylvania.

== Biography ==
Jacob K. McKenty was born in Douglassville, Pennsylvania on January 19, 1827, the son of Henry McKenty and Eleanor (or Elenor) McKenty. He graduated from Yale College in 1848 and Yale Law School in 1850.

He completed his studies by reading law with William Strong, was admitted to the bar in 1851 and commenced practice in Reading, Pennsylvania. He served as prosecuting attorney of Berks County, Pennsylvania from 1856 to 1859.

McKenty was elected as a Democrat to the Thirty-sixth Congress to fill the vacancy caused by the death of John Schwartz and served from December 3, 1860 to March 3, 1861. He was not a candidate for reelection in 1860, and resumed the practice of his profession in Reading. He was an unsuccessful candidate for the Democratic nomination for Congress in 1862 and 1864.

McKenty died in Douglassville on January 3, 1866, and was buried at St. Gabriel's Episcopal Church Cemetery in Douglasville.

== Sources ==
=== Books ===
- Spencer, Thomas E. (1998). Where They're Buried. Clearfield Company: Baltimore, MD. ISBN 978-0-8063-4823-0.
- Tuttle, Roger Walker (1911). Biographies of Graduates of the Yale Law School, 1824-1899. New Haven, CT: Tuttle, Morehouse & Taylor.
- Yale University (1877). Catalogue of the Officers and Graduates of Yale University. New Haven, CT: Tuttle, Morehouse & Taylor.

== External sources ==
- United States Congress. "Jacob Kerlin McKenty (id: M000503)". Biographical Directory of the United States Congress.
- Jacob Kerlin McKenty at Find a Grave
- Jacob Kerlin McKenty at The Political Graveyard

U.S. House of Representatives
| Preceded by John Schwartz | Member of the U.S. House of Representatives from Pennsylvania's 8th congressional district 1860 - 1861 | Succeeded by Sydenham E. Ancona |
