= John Schwartz =

American politician (1793–1860)

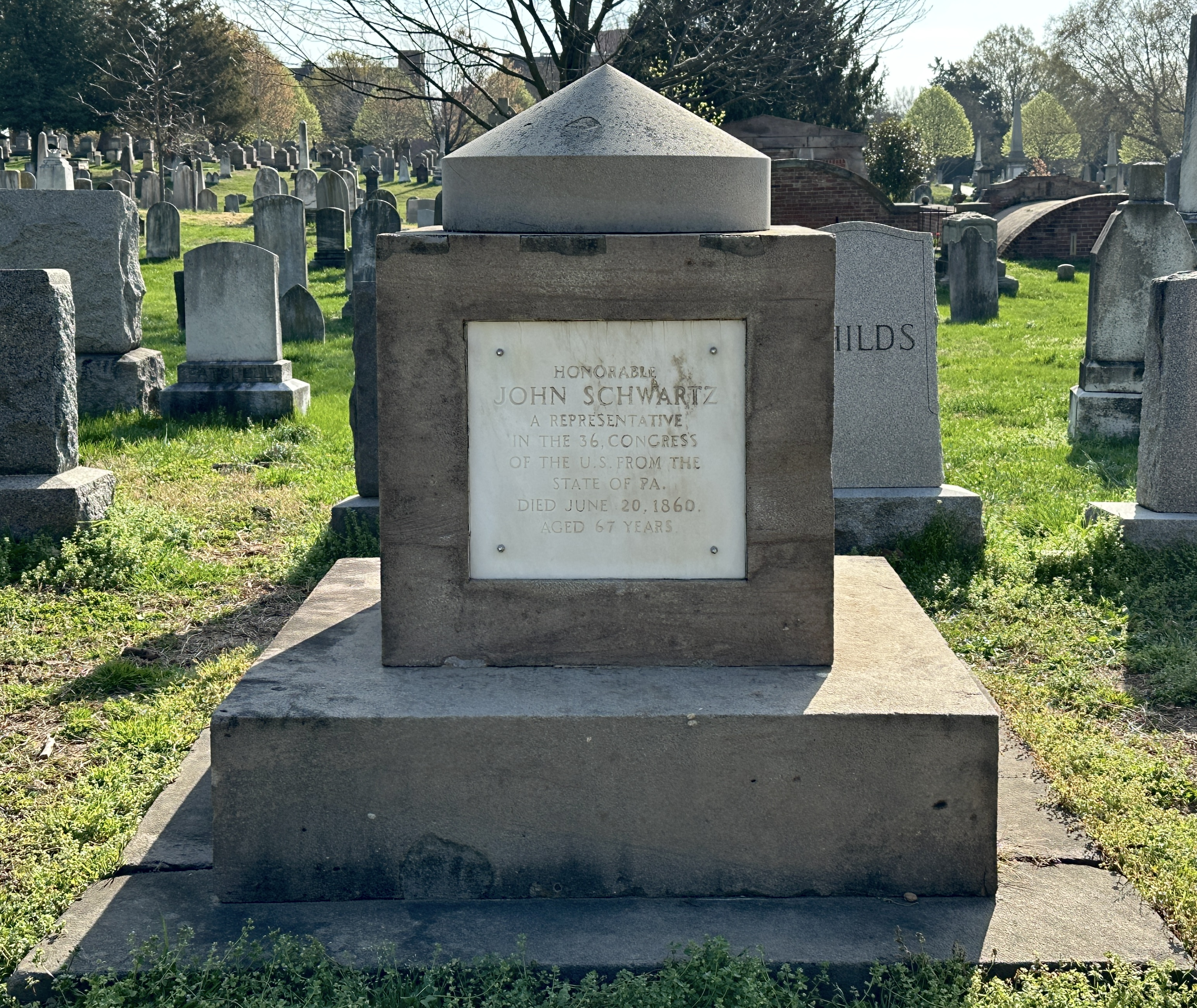
- Schwartz's cenotaph in Congressional Cemetery

Member of the U.S. House of Representatives from Pennsylvania's 6th district
- In office March 4, 1859 – June 20, 1860
- Preceded by: William High Keim
- Succeeded by: Jacob Kerlin McKenty

Personal details
- Born: October 27, 1793 Northumberland County, Pennsylvania, U.S.
- Died: June 20, 1860 (aged 66) Washington, D.C., U.S.
- Resting place: Charles Evans Cemetery; Reading, Pennsylvania, U.S.
- Party: Democratic
- Spouse: Elizabeth Wood
- Parent(s): Philip Schwartz; Maria Magdalena Schlosser
- Profession: Politician

Military service
- Allegiance: United States
- Rank: Major
- Battles/wars: War of 1812

John Schwartz (October 27, 1793 – June 20, 1860) was a 19th-century American merchant who was an Anti-Lecompton Democratic member of the United States House of Representatives from Pennsylvania from 1859 to 1860.

== Biography ==
Schwartz was born in Northumberland County, Pennsylvania to Philip Schwartz and Maria Magdalena Schlosser, and was apprenticed to a merchant in Reading, Pennsylvania. He became a partner at the expiration of his apprenticeship.

=== Family military involvement ===
Schwartz served in the War of 1812 as a major, and was engaged in the manufacture of iron products at Flying Hills Furnace in Flying Hills, Pa. One of the first in the Americas using the Irish double furnace method, using less wood to maintain kiln temperatures. His father, Philip, served in the Revolutionary War and was in the Battle of Valley Forge. He’s mother Magaretha Schlosser Schwartz birth and wedding certificate have been displayed by the National Archives and sold as a print.

=== Congress ===
Schwartz was elected as an Anti-Lecompton Democrat to the Thirty-sixth Congress and served until his death in Washington, D.C. in 1860. Compared to John Brown in local Congressional printing office publications as a trader to American values at his outspokenness to his own party. He stood firm against Clancy Jones and Democrat President James Buchanan and as northern against slavery. Congress closed with Charles Sumner remembered a man with convictions, kindness and warm spirit to show respect towards all.

=== Death and burial ===
He died on June 20, 1860, and was interred in Charles Evans Cemetery in Reading, Pennsylvania. Cenotaph at Congressional Cemetery.

== See also ==
- List of members of the United States Congress who died in office (1790–1899)
- United States Congress. "John Schwartz (id: S000158)". Biographical Directory of the United States Congress.

U.S. House of Representatives
Preceded by William High Keim	Member of the U.S. House of Representatives from Pennsylvania's 8th congressional district 1859–1860	Succeeded by Jacob Kerlin McKenty
