= Cyrus Spink =

American politician

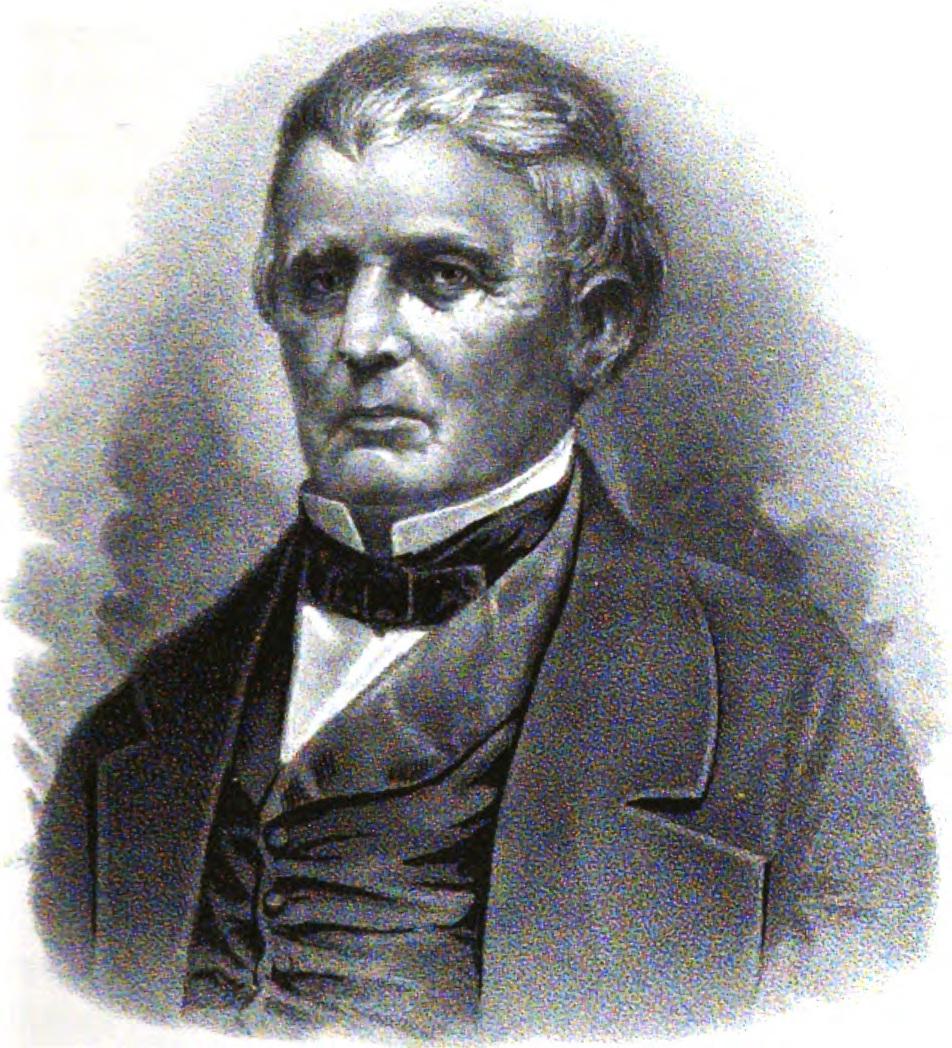

Member of the U.S. House of Representatives from Ohio's 14th district
- In office March 4, 1859 – May 31, 1859
- Preceded by: Philemon Bliss
- Succeeded by: Harrison G. O. Blake

Member of the Ohio House of Representatives from the Wayne County district
- In office December 2, 1822 – November 30, 1823
- Preceded by: Benjamin Jones
- Succeeded by: Robert McClarren

Personal details
- Born: March 24, 1793 Berkshire County, Massachusetts, U.S.
- Died: May 31, 1859 (aged 66) Wooster, Ohio, U.S.
- Resting place: Wooster Cemetery
- Party: Republican
- Spouse: Nancy Campbell Beall
- Children: six

Cyrus Spink (March 24, 1793 – May 31, 1859) was an American educator and politician who served as a U.S. representative from Ohio for three months in 1859 prior to his death in office.

== Biography ==
Born in Berkshire County, Massachusetts, Spink moved to Stark County, Ohio, in 1815.

=== Early career ===
He taught school for several years in Kendal, Ohio. He was appointed deputy surveyor of Wayne County in October 1815 and served until December 1816. County surveyor from 1816 to 1821, serving also for a time as district surveyor. County auditor in 1820 and 1821.

=== Political activities ===
He served as member of the State house of representatives in 1821 and 1822. He was employed in the register's office at Wooster 1822-1824. He was appointed register by President Monroe in 1824. Reappointed by President Adams in 1828 and served until 1832.

He engaged in mercantile pursuits in Wooster. Presidential elector in 1844 for Clay/Frelinghuysen. He served as member of the State board of equalization in 1846. He served as delegate to the Whig National Convention in 1852. He was appointed by Governor Chase one of the directors of the Ohio Penitentiary in 1856.

=== Congress ===
Spink was elected as a Republican to the Thirty-sixth Congress and served from March 4, 1859, until his death in Wooster, Ohio, on May 31, 1859. He was interred in Wooster Cemetery.

=== Personal life ===
He was married to Nancy Campbell Beall, daughter of General Reasin Beall, February 19, 1819. They had six children. Spink was a Baptist.

== See also ==
- List of members of the United States Congress who died in office (1790–1899)

== Sources ==
- United States Congress. "Cyrus Spink (id: S000735)". Biographical Directory of the United States Congress.
- Taylor, William Alexander; Taylor, Aubrey Clarence (1899). Ohio statesmen and annals of progress: from the year 1788 to the year 1900 ... Vol. 1. State of Ohio. p. 255.
- Douglass, Ben (1878). History of Wayne county, Ohio, from the days of the pioneers and the first settlers to the present time. Indianapolis: Robert Douglass. pp. 332–335.

U.S. House of Representatives
Preceded by Philemon Bliss	Member of the U.S. House of Representatives from Ohio's 14th congressional district 1859	Succeeded by Harrison G. O. Blake
