= James Lindsay Seward =

American politician (1813–1886)

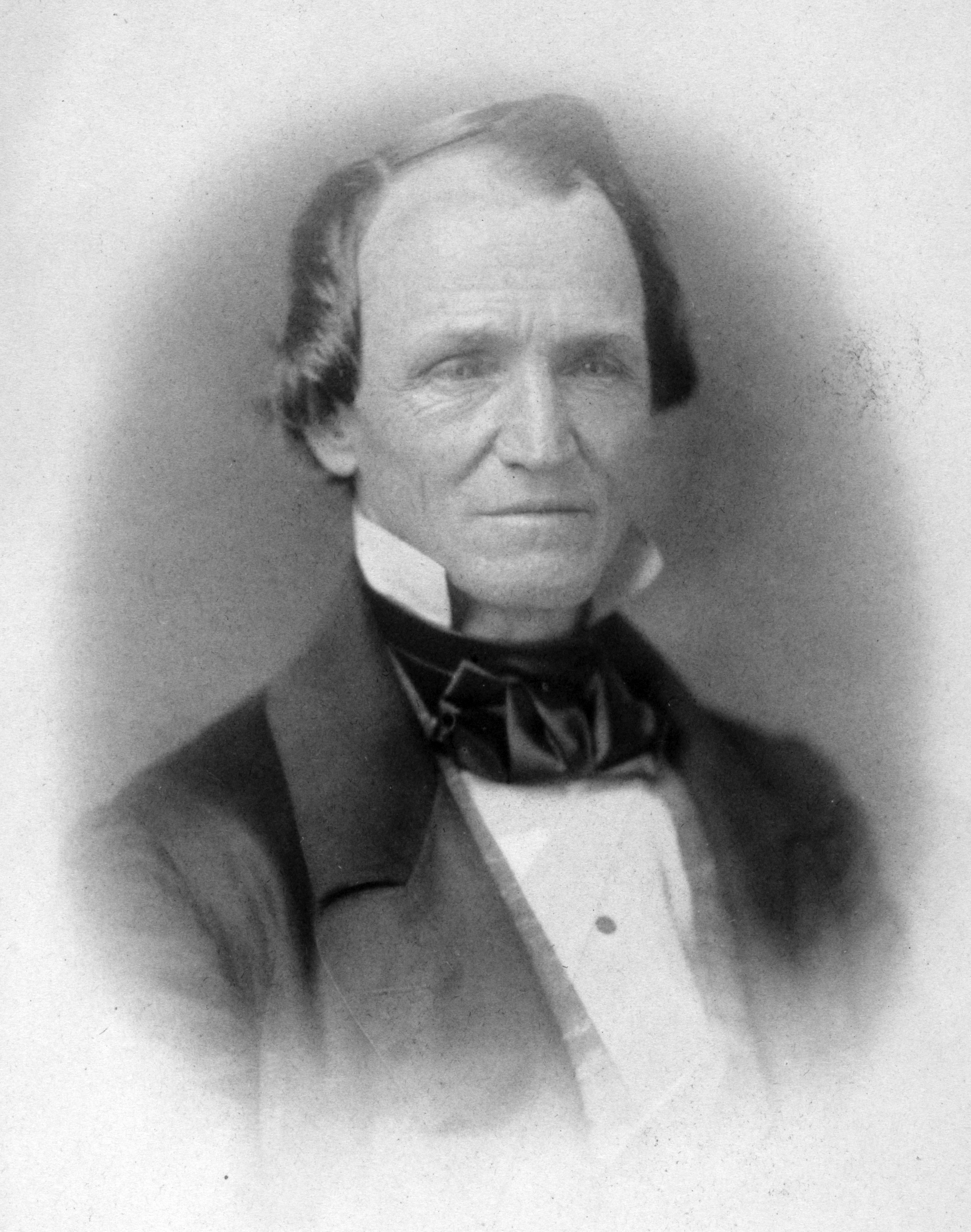
- Seward, photographed in 1859

Member of the U.S. House of Representatives from Georgia's 1st district
- In office March 4, 1853 – March 3, 1859
- Preceded by: Joseph W. Jackson
- Succeeded by: Peter E. Love

Personal details
- Born: October 30, 1813 Dublin, Georgia, U.S.
- Died: November 21, 1886 (aged 73) Thomasville, Georgia, U.S.
- Resting place: Laurel Hill Cemetery, Thomasville, Georgia, U.S.
- Party: Democratic
- Occupation: Politician, lawyer

James Lindsay Seward (October 30, 1813 – November 21, 1886) was an American politician and lawyer.

Born in Dublin, Georgia in 1813, Seward moved with his family to Thomas County, Georgia, in 1826. He studied law, gained admission to the state bar in 1835, and began practicing law in Thomasville, Georgia.

Seward was elected to the Georgia State House of Representatives in 1835 and served in that position through 1839. He was elected to that body again in 1847 and served through 1852. He was elected in 1852 as a Democrat to represent Georgia's 1st congressional district in the United States House of Representatives for the 33rd Congress. He was elected to two more terms in that seat before not seeking reelection in 1858.

Returning to his practice of law, Seward also served as a delegate to the Democratic State conventions in 1858, 1859, and 1860. He was elected to the Georgia Senate from 1859 through 1865 and was a delegate to the 1860 Democratic National Conventions in Baltimore, Maryland and Charleston, South Carolina.

Seward served on the board of trustees of Young’s Female College from 1860 through 1886 and of the University of Georgia in Athens from 1865 through 1886. He continued to be involved in politics, serving as a delegate to the Georgia constitutional convention in 1865, the Democratic Conservative Convention in 1870 and the Georgia constitutional convention in 1877. He died in Thomasville on November 21, 1886, and was buried in that city's Laurel Hill Cemetery.

U.S. House of Representatives
Preceded by Joseph W. Jackson	Member of the U.S. House of Representatives from Georgia's 1st congressional district March 4, 1853 – March 3, 1859	Succeeded by Peter Early Love
