= Peter E. Love =

American politician (1818–1866)

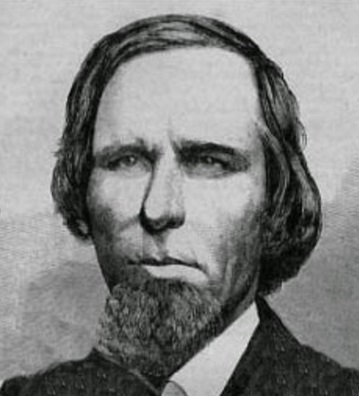
- From Part 1 of 1862's Harper's Pictorial History of the Great Rebellion

Member of the U.S. House of Representatives from Georgia's 1st district
- In office March 4, 1859 – January 23, 1861
- Preceded by: James Lindsay Seward

Personal details
- Born: Peter Early Love; July 7, 1818 Dublin, Georgia, U.S.
- Died: November 8, 1866 (aged 48) Thomasville, Georgia, U.S.
- Resting place: Old Cemetery, Thomasville, Georgia, U.S.
- Party: Democratic
- Education: Franklin College; Philadelphia College of Medicine
- Occupation: Politician, lawyer, jurist, physician

Peter Early Love (July 7, 1818 – November 8, 1866) was an American politician, lawyer and jurist.

Born in Dublin, Georgia, in 1818, Love attended Franklin College, the founding college of the University of Georgia in Athens, where he was a member of the Phi Kappa Literary Society and graduated in 1829. He then graduated from the Philadelphia College of Medicine in 1838 and became a practicing physician. During this time, Love also studied law and was admitted to the Georgia state bar in 1839. He began practicing law in Thomasville, Georgia.

In 1842, Love became the solicitor general for the southern district of Georgia. In 1849, he was elected to the Georgia Senate. In 1853, Love became a superior court judge in the southern circuit. Love was elected in 1858 as a Democrat to represent Georgia's 1st congressional district in the United States House of Representatives for the 36th Congress. After resigning near the end of that term, Love returned to practicing law in Thomasville. He won election to the Georgia House of Representatives in 1861. Love died in Thomasville on November 8, 1866, and was buried in that city's Old Cemetery.

U.S. House of Representatives
Preceded by James Lindsay Seward	Member of the U.S. House of Representatives from Georgia's 1st congressional district March 4, 1859 – January 23, 1861	Succeeded by American Civil War
