= Harrison G. O. Blake =

American politician and colonel

Harrison G.O. Blake
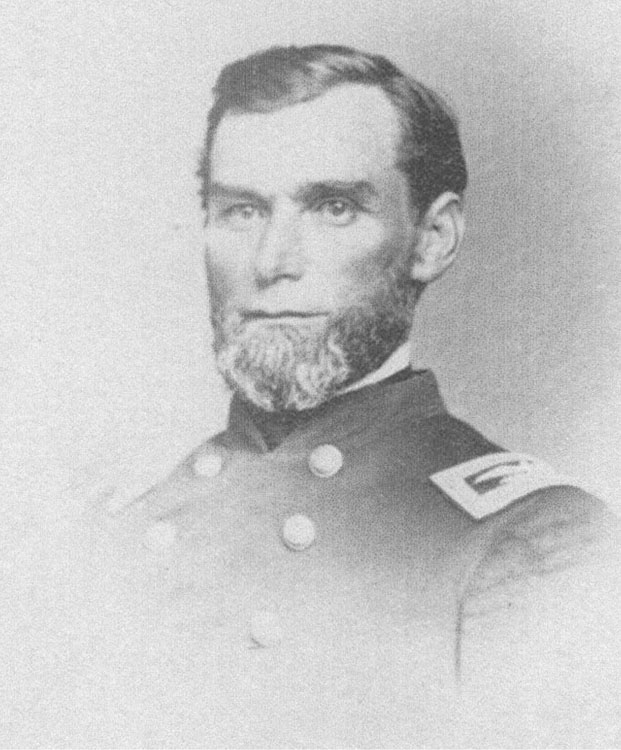

Member of the U.S. House of Representatives from Ohio's 14th district
- In office October 11, 1859 – March 3, 1863
- Preceded by: Cyrus Spink
- Succeeded by: George Bliss

Member of the Ohio House of Representatives
- In office 1846–1847

Member of the Ohio Senate
- In office 1848

Personal details
- Born: Harrison Gray Otis Blake; March 17, 1818 Newfane, Vermont, U.S.
- Died: April 16, 1876 (aged 58) Medina, Ohio, U.S.
- Resting place: Spring Grove Cemetery, Medina
- Party: Republican

Military service
- Allegiance: United States
- Branch/service: Union Army
- Years of service: May 15, 1864 – September 9, 1864
- Rank: Colonel
- Unit: 166th Ohio Infantry

Harrison Gray Otis Blake (March 17, 1818 – April 16, 1876) was an American lawyer and politician who served two terms as a U.S. representative from Ohio from 1859 to 1863.

== Biography ==
Born in Newfane, Vermont, Blake moved to Salem, New York, and in 1830 to Guilford, Ohio. He received his education at public schools, later studying medicine at Seville for one year. In 1836, he moved to Medina, where he engaged in mercantile pursuits and studied law.

He was admitted to the bar and commenced practice in Medina.

=== Early political career ===
From 1846 to 1847, he served as a member of the Ohio House of Representatives, and was elected to the Ohio State Senate in 1848, serving as that chamber's president.

=== Congress ===
Blake was elected as a Republican to the 36th United States Congress to fill the vacancy caused by the death of Cyrus Spink, formerly Representative for Ohio's 14th congressional district. He was reelected to that Congress, serving from October 11, 1859, to March 3, 1863.

=== Civil War ===
He was not a candidate for renomination in 1862 to the Thirty-eighth Congress, but instead, with the Civil War raging, entered the United States Army in 1864. He served as colonel of the 166th Ohio Infantry, a Hundred Days Regiment.

=== Later career ===
After the war, he declined the appointment of Governor of Idaho Territory, resuming the practice of law and maintaining an interest in banking and mercantile pursuits.

He served as delegate to the Loyalist Convention at Philadelphia in 1866. Blake also served as mayor of Medina from 1870 to 1872.

=== Death and burial ===
He died ten years later in Medina, Ohio, on April 16, 1876. He was interred in Spring Grove Cemetery.

== Sources ==
- United States Congress. "Harrison G. O. Blake (id: B000531)". Biographical Directory of the United States Congress.

U.S. House of Representatives
Preceded by Cyrus Spink	United States Representative from Ohio's 14th congressional district October 11, 1859–March 3, 1863	Succeeded by George Bliss
Ohio Senate
Preceded by Nathan P. Johnson	Senator from Medina & Lorain Counties; December 4, 1848-December 1, 1850	Succeeded by Aaron Pardee
Ohio House of Representatives
Preceded by Earl Moulton	Representative from Medina County; December 7, 1846-December 3, 1848	Succeeded by J. S. Copeland
