= 36th United States Congress =

1859-1861 U.S. Congress

| ← | 35th | 37th | → |
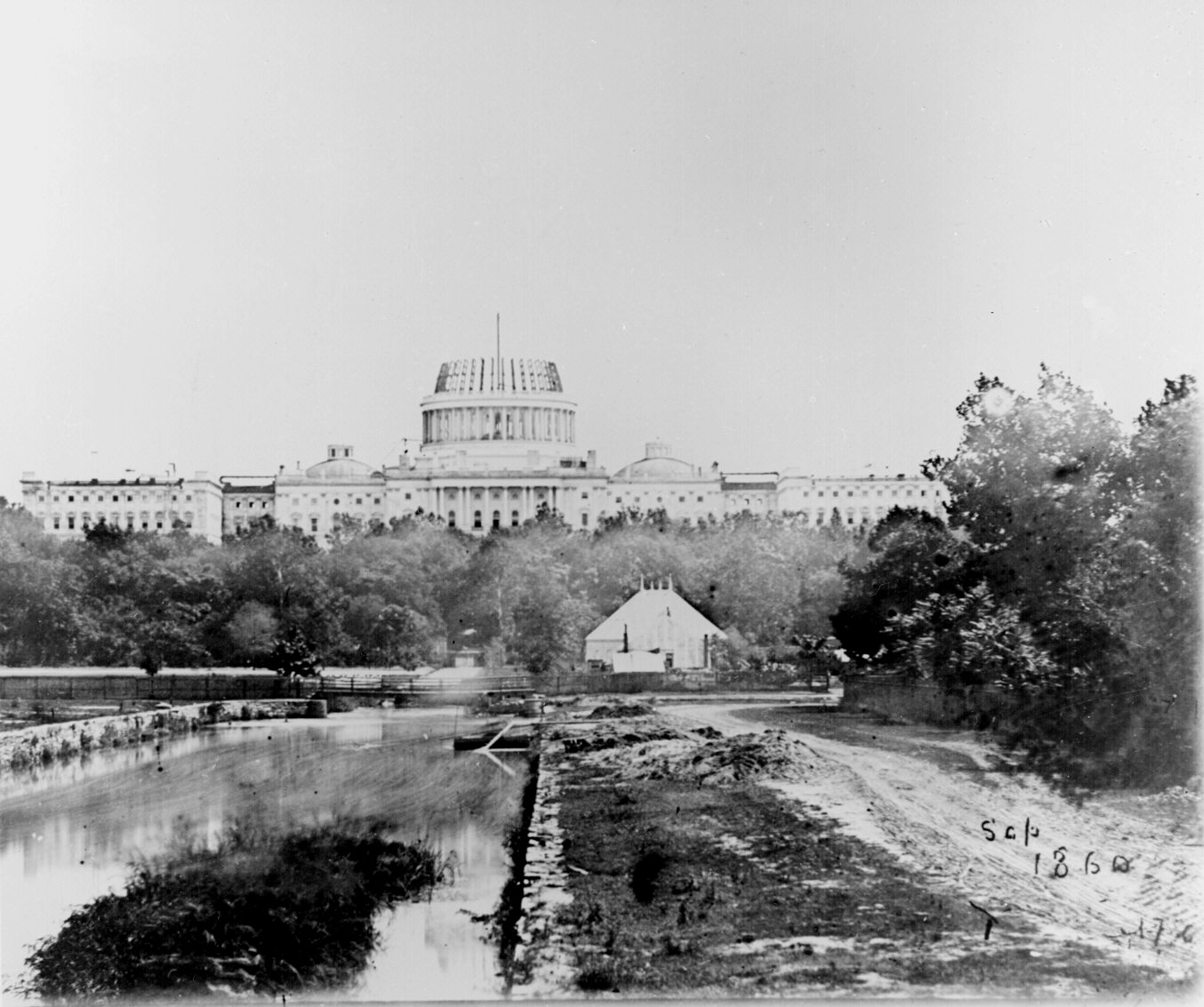
- United States Capitol (1860)

Overview
- Legislative body: United States Congress
- Jurisdiction: United States
- Term: March 4, 1859 – March 4, 1861

Senate
- Members: 66
- President: John C. Breckinridge (D)
- President pro tempore: Benjamin Fitzpatrick (D); Jesse D. Bright (D); Solomon Foot (R)
- Party control: Democratic (until February 4, 1861); Republican (from February 4, 1861)

House of Representatives
- Members: 238 representatives 5 non-voting delegates
- Speaker: William Pennington (R)
- Party control: Republican-led coalition

Sessions
- Special (Note: Special session of the Senate.): March 4, 1859 – March 10, 1859
- 1st: December 5, 1859 – June 26, 1860
- Special (Note: Special session of the Senate.): June 26, 1860 – June 28, 1860
- 2nd: December 3, 1860 – March 4, 1861

The 36th United States Congress was a meeting of the legislative branch of the United States federal government, consisting of the United States Senate and the United States House of Representatives. It met in Washington, D.C. from March 4, 1859, to March 4, 1861, during the third and fourth years of James Buchanan's presidency. The apportionment of seats in the House of Representatives was based on the 1850 United States census. The Senate had a Democratic majority, and the House had a Republican plurality.

== Major events ==
- June 8, 1859: Comstock Lode discovered in the western Utah Territory (present-day Nevada)
- August 27, 1859: First oil well was drilled in the United States, near Titusville, Pennsylvania
- October 16–18, 1859: John Brown's raid on Harpers Ferry
- December 2, 1859 John Brown executed.
- December 5, 1859 – February 1, 1860: The election for the House speakership takes 44 ballots
- April 3, 1860: Pony Express began its first run
- April 23 – May 3, 1860: Democratic National Convention held in Charleston, South Carolina. Unable to agree on a nominee, the delegates voted to reconvene in June.
- May 9, 1860: Constitutional Union Party National Convention held in Baltimore, Maryland, nominating John Bell for president.
- May 18, 1860: Republican National Convention held in Chicago, Illinois, nominating Abraham Lincoln for president.
- June 18–23, 1860: Democratic Party reconvened in Baltimore, Maryland, nominating Stephen A. Douglas for president.
- June 26–28, 1860: Southern Democrats held a convention in Richmond, Virginia, nominating John C. Breckinridge for president.
- November 6, 1860: U.S. presidential election: Abraham Lincoln beat John C. Breckinridge, Stephen A. Douglas, and John Bell.
- December 20, 1860: South Carolina Secession Convention enacted an Ordinance of Secession
- January 3, 1861: Delaware Secession Convention voted not to secede from the Union
- January 9, 1861: Mississippi Secession Convention enacted an Ordinance of Secession
- January 10, 1861: Florida Secession Convention enacted an Ordinance of Secession
- January 11, 1861: Alabama Secession Convention enacted an Ordinance of Secession
- January 18, 1861: Georgia Secession Convention enacted an Ordinance of Secession
- January 26, 1861: Louisiana Secession Convention enacted an Ordinance of Secession
- January 29, 1861. Kansas admitted to the Union as a free state.
- February 1, 1861: Texas Secession Convention enacted an Ordinance of Secession
- February 13, 1861: Joint Session of Congress certified the election of President Abraham Lincoln and Vice President Hannibal Hamlin.
- February 23, 1861: The people of Texas ratified its Ordinance of Secession President-elect Abraham Lincoln arrived secretly in Washington, D.C. after an alleged assassination plot in Baltimore, Maryland.

== Major legislation ==
- June 16, 1860: Pacific Telegraph Act of 1860, ch. 147, 12 Stat. 41
- June 23, 1860: Printing Act of 1860, Sess. 1, Joint Res. 25, 12 Stat. 117
- December 18, 1860 (introduced): Crittenden Compromise, rejected by the House of Representatives and the Senate
- March 2, 1861: Morrill Tariff, ch. 68, 12 Stat. 178

== Constitutional amendments ==
- March 2, 1861: Approved an amendment to the United States Constitution that would shield "domestic institutions" of the states (which in 1861 included slavery) from the constitutional amendment process and from abolition or interference by Congress, and submitted it to the state legislatures for ratification 12 Stat. 251
  - This amendment, commonly known as the Corwin Amendment, has not been ratified and is still pending before the states.

== Treaties ==
- March 8, 1859: Quinault Treaty ratified, 12 Stat. 927
- March 8, 1859: Point No Point Treaty ratified, 12 Stat. 933

== States admitted and territories organized ==
- January 29, 1861: Kansas admitted as a state, ch. 20, 12 Stat. 126
- February 28, 1861: Colorado Territory organized, ch. 59, 12 Stat. 172
- March 2, 1861: Nevada Territory organized, ch. 83, 12 Stat. 209
- March 2, 1861: Dakota Territory organized, ch. 86, 12 Stat. 239

== Party summary ==
Senate membership

Begin (March 4, 1859)

End (March 3, 1861)

House membership

Begin (March 4, 1859)

End (March 3, 1861)

=== Senate ===
| | Party (shading shows control) | | | | Total | Vacant |
| | Know Nothing (A) | Democratic (D) | Republican (R) | Other | Total | Vacant |
|---|---|---|---|---|---|---|
| End of previous congress | 4 | 42 | 20 | 0 | 66 | 0 |
| Begin | 2 | 38 | 25 | 0 | 65 | 1 |
| End | 2 | 25 | 26 | 0 | 53 | 15 |
| Final voting share | 3.8% | 47.2% | 49.1% | 0.0% | | |
| Beginning of next congress | 0 | 22 | 29 | 1 (Note: Unconditional Union) | 52 | 16 |

=== House of Representatives ===
| | Party (shading shows control) | | | | | | | Total | Vacant |
| | Know Nothing (A) | Democratic (D) | Anti- Lecompton Democratic (ALD) | Independent Democratic (ID) | Opposition (O) | Republican (R) | Other | Total | Vacant |
|---|---|---|---|---|---|---|---|---|---|
| End of previous congress | 14 | 130 | 0 | 1 | 0 | 92 | 0 | 237 | 0 |
| Begin | 5 | 83 | 8 | 7 | 19 | 113 | 0 | 235 | 2 |
| End | 5 | 59 | 7 | 7 | 17 | 115 | 0 | 210 | 28 |
| Final voting share | 2.4% | 28.1% | 3.3% | 3.3% | 8.1% | 54.8% | 0.0% | | |
| Beginning of next congress | 0 | 44 | 0 | 1 | 0 | 108 | 25 (Note: Unconditional Union & Constitutional Union) | 178 | 62 |

== Leadership ==
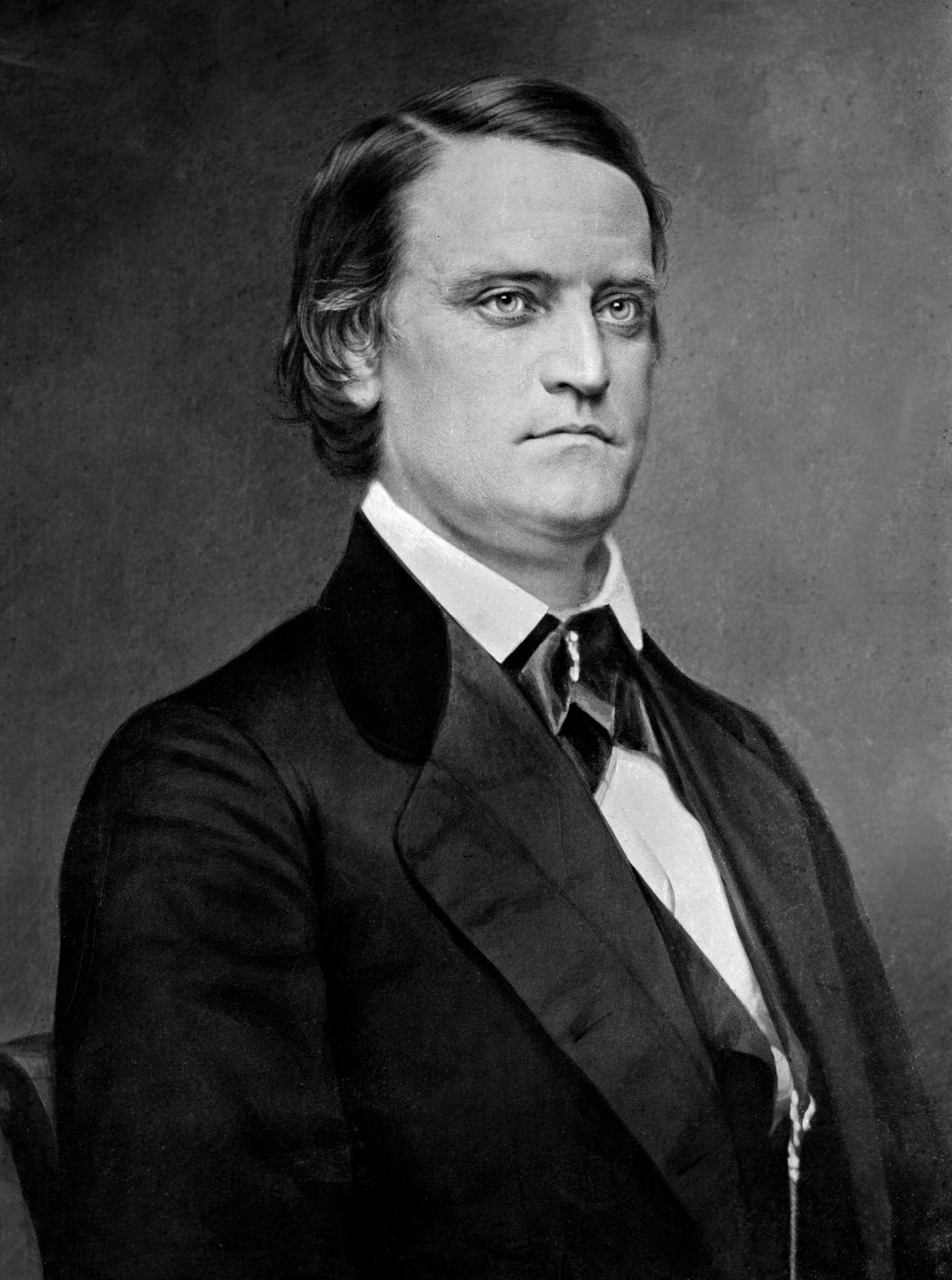
President of the Senate John C. Breckinridge

=== Senate ===
- President: John C. Breckinridge (D)
- President pro tempore: Benjamin Fitzpatrick (D), until February 26, 1860
  - Jesse D. Bright (D), June 12–26, 1860
  - Benjamin Fitzpatrick (D), June 26, 1860 – December 2, 1860
  - Solomon Foot (R), elected February 16, 1861

=== House of Representatives ===
- Speaker: William Pennington (R), elected February 1, 1860, after 44 rounds of balloting
- Democratic Caucus Chairman: George S. Houston

== Members ==
This list is arranged by chamber, then by state. Senators are listed by class, and representatives are listed by district.

Skip to House of Representatives, below

=== Senate ===
Senators were elected by the state legislatures every two years, with one-third beginning new six-year terms with each Congress. Preceding the names in the list below are Senate class numbers, which indicate the cycle of their election. In this Congress, Class 1 meant their term began in the last Congress, requiring reelection in 1862; Class 2 meant their term began with this Congress, requiring reelection in 1864; and Class 3 meant their term ended with this Congress, requiring reelection in 1860.

==== Alabama ====
▌2. Clement C. Clay Jr. (D), until January 21, 1861
▌3. Benjamin Fitzpatrick (D), until January 21, 1861

==== Arkansas ====
▌2. William K. Sebastian (D)
▌3. Robert W. Johnson (D)

==== California ====
▌1. David C. Broderick (D), until September 16, 1859

▌Henry P. Haun (D), November 3, 1859 – March 4, 1860
▌Milton Latham (D), from March 5, 1860

▌3. William M. Gwin (D)

==== Connecticut ====
▌1. James Dixon (R)
▌3. Lafayette S. Foster (R)

==== Delaware ====
▌1. James A. Bayard Jr. (D)
▌2. Willard Saulsbury Sr. (D)

==== Florida ====
▌1. Stephen Mallory (D), until January 21, 1861
▌3. David Levy Yulee (D), until January 21, 1861

==== Georgia ====
▌2. Robert Toombs (D), until February 4, 1861
▌3. Alfred Iverson Sr. (D), until January 28, 1861

==== Illinois ====
▌2. Stephen A. Douglas (D)
▌3. Lyman Trumbull (R)

==== Indiana ====
▌1. Jesse D. Bright (D)
▌3. Graham N. Fitch (D)

==== Iowa ====
▌2. James W. Grimes (R)
▌3. James Harlan (R)

==== Kansas ====
2. Vacant from January 29, 1861 (newly admitted state)
3. Vacant from January 29, 1861 (newly admitted state)

==== Kentucky ====
▌2. Lazarus W. Powell (D)
▌3. John J. Crittenden (A)

==== Louisiana ====
▌2. Judah P. Benjamin (D), until February 4, 1861
▌3. John Slidell (D), until February 4, 1861

==== Maine ====
▌1. Hannibal Hamlin (R), until January 17, 1861

▌Lot M. Morrill (R), from January 17, 1861

▌2. William Pitt Fessenden (R)

==== Maryland ====
▌1. Anthony Kennedy (A)
▌3. James A. Pearce (D)

==== Massachusetts ====
▌1. Charles Sumner (R)
▌2. Henry Wilson (R)

==== Michigan ====
▌1. Zachariah Chandler (R)
▌2. Kinsley S. Bingham (R)

==== Minnesota ====
▌1. Henry M. Rice (D)
▌2. Morton S. Wilkinson (R)

==== Mississippi ====
▌1. Jefferson Davis (D), until January 21, 1861
▌2. Albert G. Brown (D), until January 12, 1861

==== Missouri ====
▌1. Trusten Polk (D)
▌3. James S. Green (D)

==== New Hampshire ====
▌2. John P. Hale (R)
▌3. Daniel Clark (R)

==== New Jersey ====
▌1. John R. Thomson (D)
▌2. John C. Ten Eyck (R)

==== New York ====
▌1. Preston King (R)
▌3. William H. Seward (R)

==== North Carolina ====
▌2. Thomas Bragg (D)
▌3. Thomas L. Clingman (D)

==== Ohio ====
▌1. Benjamin Wade (R)
▌3. George E. Pugh (D)

==== Oregon ====
▌2. Edward D. Baker (R), from October 2, 1860
▌3. Joseph Lane (D)

==== Pennsylvania ====
▌1. Simon Cameron (R)
▌3. William Bigler (D)

==== Rhode Island ====
▌1. James F. Simmons (R)
▌2. Henry B. Anthony (R)

==== South Carolina ====
▌2. James Chesnut Jr. (D), until November 10, 1860
▌3. James H. Hammond (D), until November 11, 1860

==== Tennessee ====
▌1. Andrew Johnson (D)
▌2. Alfred O. P. Nicholson (D), until March 3, 1861

==== Texas ====
▌1. Matthias Ward (D), until December 5, 1859

▌Louis Wigfall (D), from December 5, 1859

▌2. John Hemphill (D)

==== Vermont ====
▌1. Solomon Foot (R)
▌3. Jacob Collamer (R)

==== Virginia ====
▌1. James M. Mason (D)
▌2. Robert M. T. Hunter (D)

==== Wisconsin ====
▌1. James R. Doolittle (R)
▌3. Charles Durkee (R)

Senators' party membership by state at the opening of the 36th Congress in March 1859. The green stripes represent Know-Nothings. 2 Democrats 1 Democrat and 1 Republican 2 Republicans

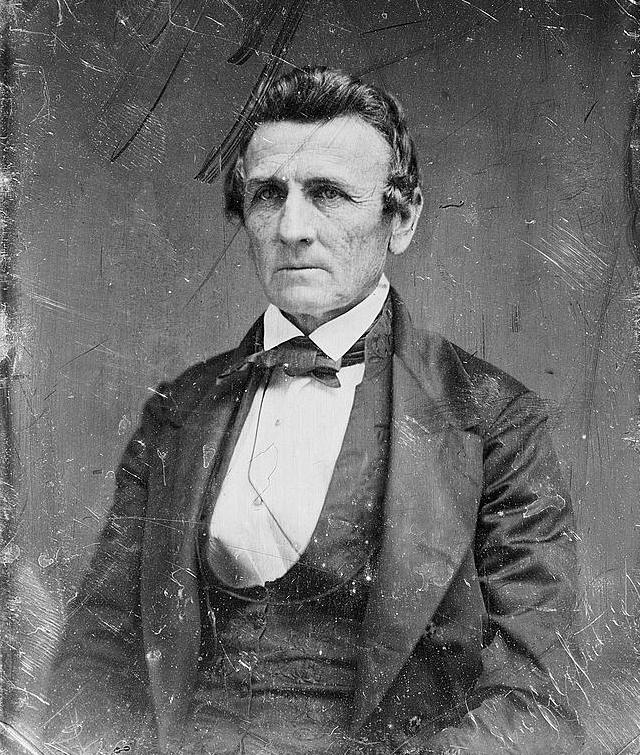
President pro tempore Benjamin Fitzpatrick, until February 26, 1860 June 26, 1860 – December 2, 1860

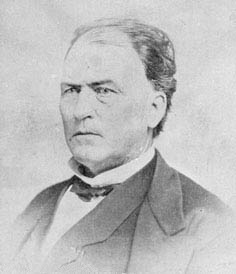
President pro tempore Jesse D. Bright, June 12, 1860 – June 13, 1860

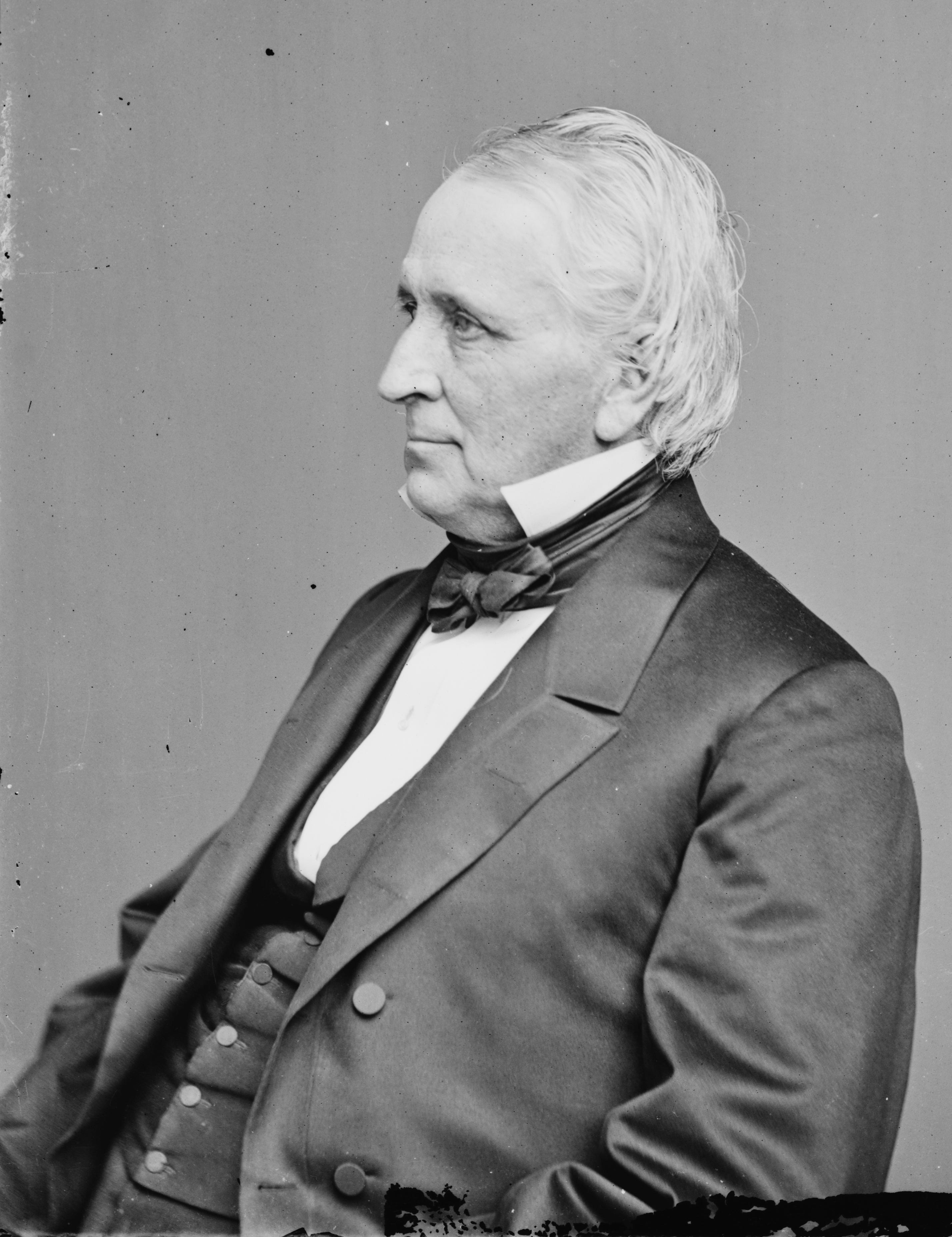
President pro tempore Solomon Foot, from February 16, 1861

=== House of Representatives ===
The names of representatives are preceded by their district numbers.

==== Alabama ====
▌1. James A. Stallworth (D), until January 21, 1861
▌2. James L. Pugh (D), until January 21, 1861
▌3. David Clopton (D), until January 21, 1861
▌4. Sydenham Moore (D), until January 21, 1861
▌5. George S. Houston (D), until January 21, 1861
▌6. Williamson R. W. Cobb (D), until January 30, 1861
▌7. Jabez L. M. Curry (D), until January 21, 1861

==== Arkansas ====
▌1. Thomas C. Hindman (D)
▌2. Albert Rust (D)

==== California ====
▌At-large. John C. Burch (D)
▌At-large. Charles L. Scott (D)

==== Connecticut ====
▌1. Dwight Loomis (R)
▌2. John Woodruff (R)
▌3. Alfred A. Burnham (R)
▌4. Orris S. Ferry (R)

==== Delaware ====
▌At-large. William G. Whiteley (D)

==== Florida ====
▌At-large. George S. Hawkins (D), until January 21, 1861

==== Georgia ====
▌1. Peter E. Love (D), until January 23, 1861
▌2. Martin J. Crawford (D), until January 23, 1861
▌3. Thomas Hardeman Jr. (O), until January 23, 1861
▌4. Lucius J. Gartrell (D), until January 23, 1861
▌5. John W. H. Underwood (D), until January 23, 1861
▌6. James Jackson (D), until January 23, 1861
▌7. Joshua Hill (O), until January 23, 1861
▌8. John J. Jones (D), until January 23, 1861

==== Illinois ====
▌1. Elihu B. Washburne (R)
▌2. John F. Farnsworth (R)
▌3. Owen Lovejoy (R)
▌4. William Kellogg (R)
▌5. Isaac N. Morris (D)
▌6. John A. McClernand (D), from November 8, 1859
▌7. James C. Robinson (D)
▌8. Philip B. Fouke (D)
▌9. John A. Logan (D)

==== Indiana ====
▌1. William E. Niblack (D)
▌2. William H. English (D)
▌3. William McKee Dunn (R)
▌4. William S. Holman (D)
▌5. David Kilgore (R)
▌6. Albert G. Porter (R)
▌7. John G. Davis (ALD)
▌8. James Wilson (R)
▌9. Schuyler Colfax (R)
▌10. Charles Case (R)
▌11. John U. Pettit (R)

==== Iowa ====
▌1. Samuel Curtis (R)
▌2. William Vandever (R)

==== Kansas ====
▌At-large. Martin F. Conway (R), from January 29, 1861 (newly admitted state)

==== Kentucky ====
▌1. Henry C. Burnett (D)
▌2. Samuel O. Peyton (D)
▌3. Francis Bristow (O)
▌4. William C. Anderson (O)
▌5. John Y. Brown (D), from December 3, 1860
▌6. Green Adams (O)
▌7. Robert Mallory (O)
▌8. William E. Simms (D)
▌9. Laban T. Moore (O)
▌10. John W. Stevenson (D)

==== Louisiana ====
▌1. John E. Bouligny (A)
▌2. Miles Taylor (D), until February 5, 1861
▌3. Thomas G. Davidson (D)
▌4. John M. Landrum (D)

==== Maine ====
▌1. Daniel E. Somes (R)
▌2. John J. Perry (R)
▌3. Ezra B. French (R)
▌4. Freeman H. Morse (R)
▌5. Israel Washburn Jr. (R), until January 1, 1861

▌Stephen Coburn (R), from January 2, 1861

▌6. Stephen C. Foster (R)

==== Maryland ====
▌1. James A. Stewart (D)
▌2. Edwin H. Webster (A)
▌3. J. Morrison Harris (A)
▌4. Henry Winter Davis (A)
▌5. Jacob M. Kunkel (D)
▌6. George W. Hughes (D)

==== Massachusetts ====
▌1. Thomas D. Eliot (R)
▌2. James Buffington (R)
▌3. Charles F. Adams Sr. (R)
▌4. Alexander H. Rice (R)
▌5. Anson Burlingame (R)
▌6. John B. Alley (R)
▌7. Daniel W. Gooch (R)
▌8. Charles R. Train (R)
▌9. Eli Thayer (R)
▌10. Charles Delano (R)
▌11. Henry L. Dawes (R)

==== Michigan ====
▌1. George B. Cooper (D), until May 15, 1860

▌William A. Howard (R), from May 15, 1860

▌2. Henry Waldron (R)
▌3. Francis W. Kellogg (R)
▌4. Dewitt C. Leach (R)

==== Minnesota ====
Both representatives were elected statewide on a general ticket.
(2 Republicans)

▌At-large. Cyrus Aldrich (R)
▌At-large. William Windom (R)

==== Mississippi ====
▌1. Lucius Q. C. Lamar (D), until December 20, 1860
▌2. Reuben Davis (D), until January 12, 1861
▌3. William Barksdale (D), until January 12, 1861
▌4. Otho R. Singleton (D), until January 12, 1861
▌5. John J. McRae (D), until January 12, 1861

==== Missouri ====
▌1. John R. Barret (D), until June 8, 1860

▌Francis P. Blair Jr. (R), June 8, 1860 – June 25, 1860
▌John R. Barret (D), from December 3, 1860

▌2. Thomas L. Anderson (ID)
▌3. John B. Clark (D)
▌4. James Craig (D)
▌5. Samuel H. Woodson (A)
▌6. John S. Phelps (D)
▌7. John W. Noell (D)

==== New Hampshire ====
▌1. Gilman Marston (R)
▌2. Mason Tappan (R)
▌3. Thomas M. Edwards (R)

==== New Jersey ====
▌1. John T. Nixon (R)
▌2. John L. N. Stratton (R)
▌3. Garnett Adrain (ALD)
▌4. Jetur R. Riggs (ALD)
▌5. William Pennington (R)

==== New York ====
▌1. Luther C. Carter (R)
▌2. James Humphrey (R)
▌3. Daniel Sickles (D)
▌4. Thomas J. Barr (ID)
▌5. William B. Maclay (D)
▌6. John Cochrane (D)
▌7. George Briggs (R)
▌8. Horace F. Clark (ALD)
▌9. John B. Haskin (ALD)
▌10. Charles H. Van Wyck (R)
▌11. William S. Kenyon (R)
▌12. Charles L. Beale (R)
▌13. Abram B. Olin (R)
▌14. John H. Reynolds (ALD)
▌15. James B. McKean (R)
▌16. George W. Palmer (R)
▌17. Francis E. Spinner (R)
▌18. Clark B. Cochrane (R)
▌19. James H. Graham (R)
▌20. Roscoe Conkling (R)
▌21. R. Holland Duell (R)
▌22. M. Lindley Lee (R)
▌23. Charles B. Hoard (R)
▌24. Charles B. Sedgwick (R)
▌25. Martin Butterfield (R)
▌26. Emory B. Pottle (R)
▌27. Alfred Wells (R)
▌28. William Irvine (R)
▌29. Alfred Ely (R)
▌30. Augustus Frank (R)
▌31. Silas M. Burroughs (R), until June 3, 1860

▌Edwin R. Reynolds (R), from December 5, 1860

▌32. Elbridge G. Spaulding (R)
▌33. Reuben Fenton (R)

==== North Carolina ====
▌1. William N. H. Smith (O)
▌2. Thomas Ruffin (D)
▌3. Warren Winslow (D)
▌4. Lawrence O'Bryan Branch (D)
▌5. John Gilmer (O)
▌6. James M. Leach (O)
▌7. F. Burton Craige (D)
▌8. Zebulon Vance (O)

==== Ohio ====
▌1. George H. Pendleton (D)
▌2. John A. Gurley (R)
▌3. Clement Vallandigham (D)
▌4. William Allen (D)
▌5. James M. Ashley (R)
▌6. William Howard (D)
▌7. Thomas Corwin (R)
▌8. Benjamin Stanton (R)
▌9. John Carey (R)
▌10. Carey A. Trimble (R)
▌11. Charles D. Martin (D)
▌12. Samuel S. Cox (D)
▌13. John Sherman (R)
▌14. Cyrus Spink (R), until May 31, 1859

▌Harrison G. O. Blake (R), from October 11, 1859

▌15. William Helmick (R)
▌16. Cydnor B. Tompkins (R)
▌17. Thomas C. Theaker (R)
▌18. Sidney Edgerton (R)
▌19. Edward Wade (R)
▌20. John Hutchins (R)
▌21. John Bingham (R)

==== Oregon ====
▌At-large. Lansing Stout (D)

==== Pennsylvania ====
▌1. Thomas B. Florence (D)
▌2. Edward Joy Morris (R)
▌3. John P. Verree (R)
▌4. William Millward (R)
▌5. John Wood (R)
▌6. John Hickman (ALD)
▌7. Henry C. Longnecker (R)
▌8. John Schwartz (ALD), until June 20, 1860

▌Jacob K. McKenty (D), from December 3, 1860

▌9. Thaddeus Stevens (R)
▌10. John W. Killinger (R)
▌11. James H. Campbell (R)
▌12. George W. Scranton (R)
▌13. William H. Dimmick (D)
▌14. Galusha A. Grow (R)
▌15. James T. Hale (R)
▌16. Benjamin F. Junkin (R)
▌17. Edward McPherson (R)
▌18. Samuel S. Blair (R)
▌19. John Covode (R)
▌20. William Montgomery (D)
▌21. James K. Moorhead (R)
▌22. Robert McKnight (R)
▌23. William Stewart (R)
▌24. Chapin Hall (R)
▌25. Elijah Babbitt (R)

==== Rhode Island ====
▌1. Christopher Robinson (R)
▌2. William D. Brayton (R)

==== South Carolina ====
▌1. John McQueen (D), until December 21, 1860
▌2. William P. Miles (D), until December 21, 1860
▌3. Laurence M. Keitt (D), until December 1860
▌4. Milledge L. Bonham (D), until December 21, 1860
▌5. John D. Ashmore (D), until December 21, 1860
▌6. William W. Boyce (D), until December 21, 1860

==== Tennessee ====
▌1. Thomas A. R. Nelson (O)
▌2. Horace Maynard (O)
▌3. Reese B. Brabson (O)
▌4. William B. Stokes (O)
▌5. Robert H. Hatton (O)
▌6. James H. Thomas (D)
▌7. John V. Wright (D)
▌8. James M. Quarles (O)
▌9. Emerson Etheridge (O)
▌10. William T. Avery (D)

==== Texas ====
▌1. John H. Reagan (D)
▌2. Andrew J. Hamilton (ID)

==== Vermont ====
▌1. Eliakim P. Walton (R)
▌2. Justin S. Morrill (R)
▌3. Homer E. Royce (R)

==== Virginia ====
▌1. Muscoe R. H. Garnett (D)
▌2. John S. Millson (D)
▌3. Daniel C. De Jarnette (ID)
▌4. William Goode (D), until July 3, 1859

▌Roger A. Pryor (D), from December 7, 1859

▌5. Thomas S. Bocock (D)
▌6. Shelton Leake (ID)
▌7. William Smith (D)
▌8. Alexander Boteler (O)
▌9. John T. Harris (ID)
▌10. Sherrard Clemens (D)
▌11. Albert G. Jenkins (D)
▌12. Henry A. Edmundson (D)
▌13. Elbert S. Martin (ID)

==== Wisconsin ====
▌1. John F. Potter (R)
▌2. Cadwallader C. Washburn (R)
▌3. Charles H. Larrabee (D)

==== Non-voting members ====
▌Kansas Territory. Marcus J. Parrott (R), until January 29, 1861
Nebraska Territory. Experience Estabrook, until May 18, 1860

▌Samuel G. Daily (R), from May 18, 1860

▌New Mexico Territory. Miguel A. Otero (D)
▌Utah Territory. William H. Hooper (D)
▌Washington Territory. Isaac Stevens (D)

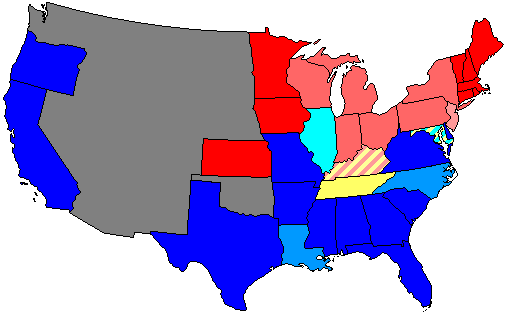
House seats by party holding plurality in state: 80+% to 100% Democratic / 80+% to 100% Republican; 60+% to 80% Democratic / 60+% to 80% Republican; Up to 60% Democratic / Up to 60% Republican

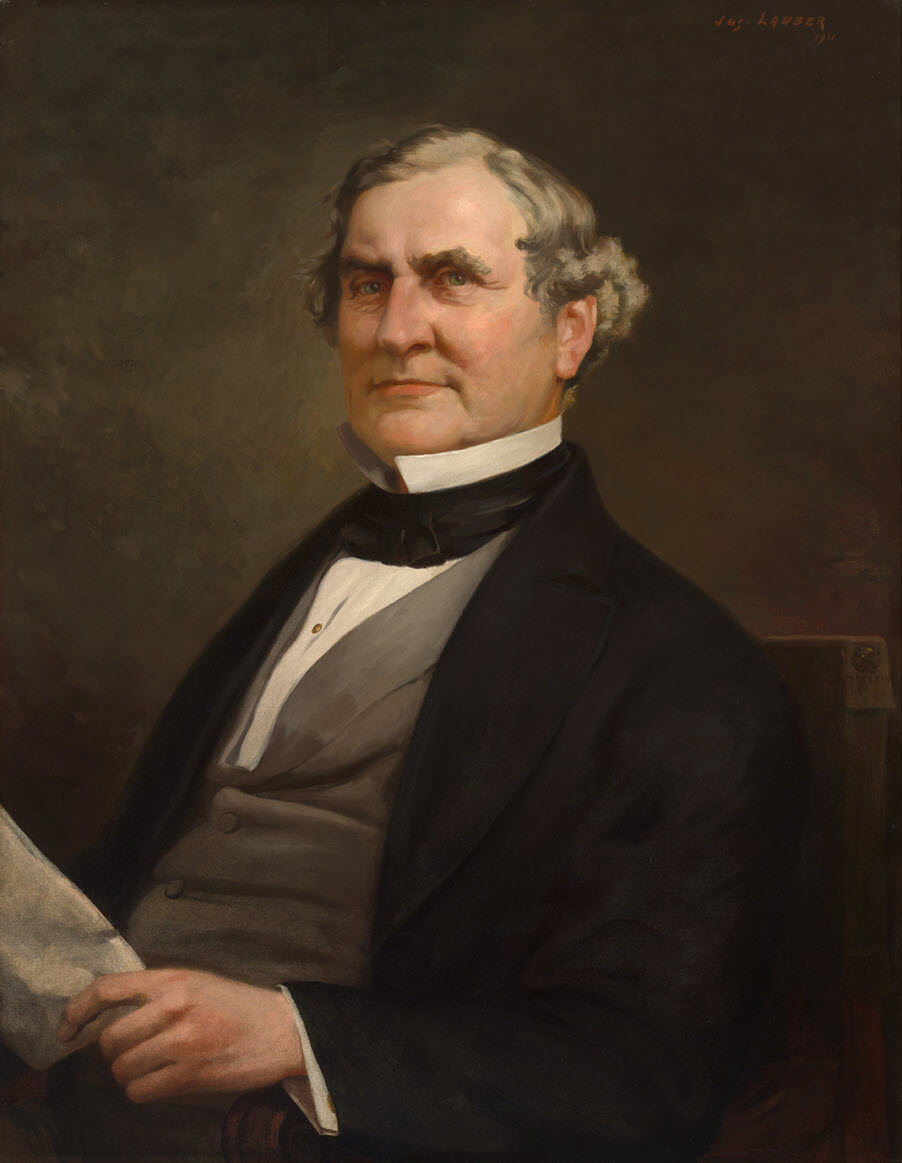
Speaker of the House William Pennington

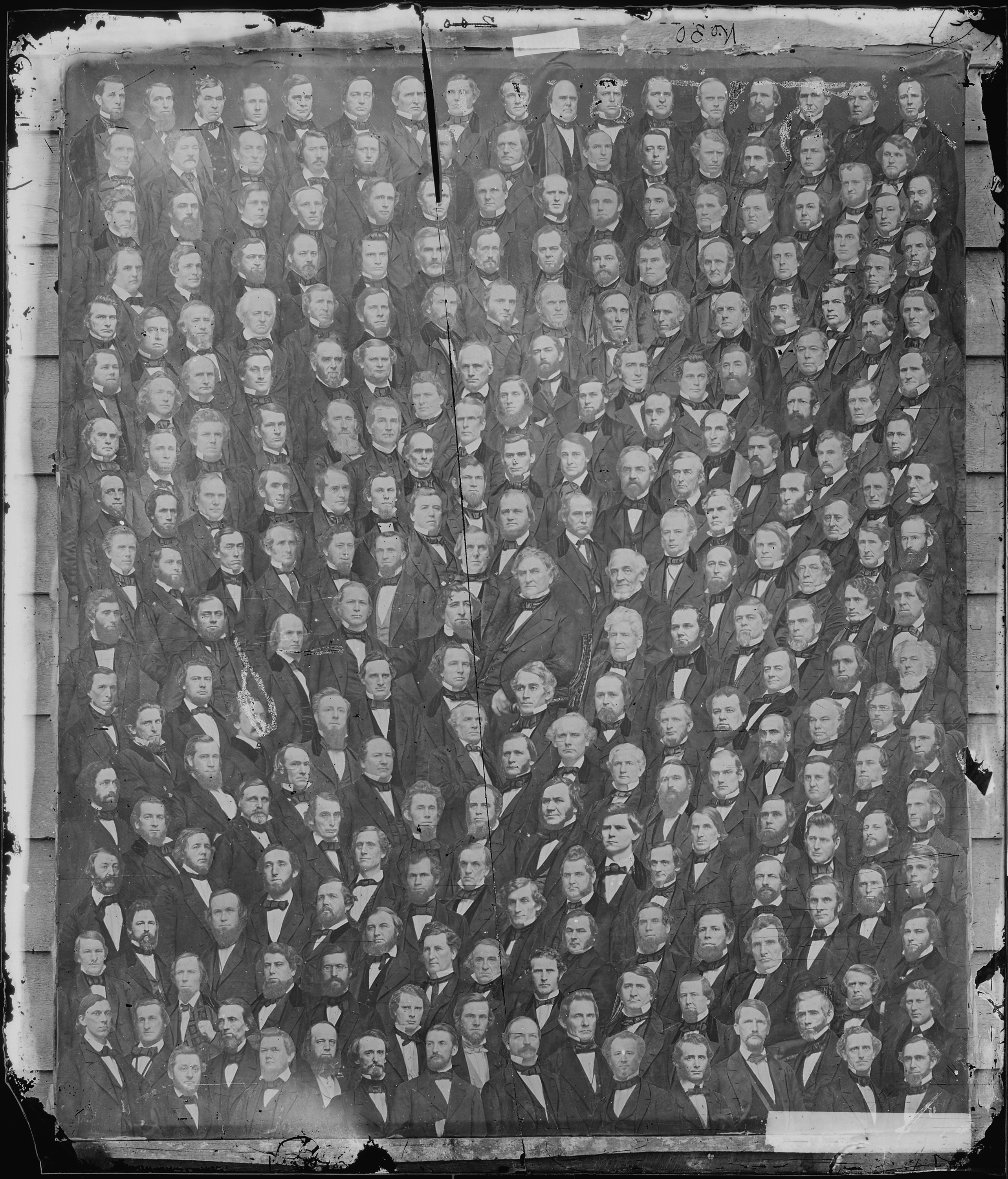
Group photo of the U.S. House of Representatives, in 1860, during this Congress.

== Changes in membership ==
The count below reflects changes from the beginning of the first session of this Congress.

=== Senate ===
- Replacements: 4
  - Democrats (D): no net change
  - Republicans (R): no net change
- Deaths: 1
- Resignations: 1
- Interim appointments: 1
- Withdrawals: 13
- Total seats with changes: 16

Senate changes
| State (class) | Vacated by | Reason for change | Successor | Date of successor's formal installation (Note: When seated or oath administered, not necessarily when service began.) |
|---|---|---|---|---|
| Oregon (2) | Vacant | Successor elected late due to legislature's failure to elect. | Edward D. Baker (R) | October 2, 1860 |
| California (1) | David C. Broderick (D) | Died September 16, 1859, after taking part in a duel he participated in, which he was unlucky. Interim successor was appointed to continue the term. | Henry P. Haun (D) | November 3, 1859 |
| Texas (1) | Matthias Ward (D) | Interim appointee lost nomination to finish the term Successor elected December 5, 1859. | Louis Wigfall (D) | December 5, 1859 |
| California (1) | Henry P. Haun (D) | Interim appointee lost election to finish the term Successor elected March 5, 1860. | Milton Latham (D) | March 5, 1860 |
| South Carolina (2) | James Chesnut Jr. (D) | Withdrew November 10, 1860. | Vacant | Not filled this Congress |
| South Carolina (3) | James H. Hammond (D) | Withdrew November 11, 1860. | Vacant | Not filled this Congress |
| Mississippi (2) | Albert G. Brown (D) | Withdrew January 12, 1861. | Vacant | Not filled this Congress |
| Maine (1) | Hannibal Hamlin (R) | Resigned January 17, 1861, to become Vice President of the United States. Successor elected January 17, 1861. | Lot M. Morrill (R) | January 17, 1861 |
| Alabama (3) | Benjamin Fitzpatrick (D) | Withdrew January 21, 1861. | Vacant | Not filled this Congress |
| Alabama (2) | Clement C. Clay (D) | Withdrew January 21, 1861. | Vacant | Not filled this Congress |
| Florida (1) | Stephen Mallory (D) | Withdrew January 21, 1861. | Vacant | Not filled this Congress |
| Florida (3) | David L. Yulee (D) | Withdrew January 21, 1861. | Vacant | Not filled this Congress |
| Mississippi (1) | Jefferson Davis (D) | Withdrew January 21, 1861. | Vacant | Not filled this Congress |
| Georgia (3) | Alfred Iverson Sr. (D) | Withdrew January 28, 1861. | Vacant | Not filled this Congress |
| Kansas (2) | New seat | New state admitted to the Union January 29, 1861; Senator was not elected until the next Congress. | Vacant | Not filled this Congress |
| Kansas (3) | New seat | New state admitted to the Union January 29, 1861; Senator was not elected until the next Congress. | Vacant | Not filled this Congress |
| Georgia (2) | Robert Toombs (D) | Withdrew February 4, 1861. | Vacant | Not filled this Congress |
| Louisiana (2) | Judah P. Benjamin (D) | Withdrew February 4, 1861. | Vacant | Not filled this Congress |
| Louisiana (3) | John Slidell (D) | Withdrew February 4, 1861. | Vacant | Not filled this Congress |
| Tennessee (2) | Alfred O. P. Nicholson (D) | Withdrew March 3, 1861. | Vacant | Not filled this Congress |

=== House of Representatives ===
- Replacements: 7
  - Democrats (D): no net change
  - Republicans (R): 1 seat net loss
  - Anti-Lecompton Democrats (LD): 1 seat net gain
- Deaths: 4
- Resignations: 3
- Contested election: 1
- Withdrawals: 28
- Total seats with changes: 41

House changes
| District | Vacated by | Reason for change | Successor | Date of successor's formal installation |
|---|---|---|---|---|
| Illinois 6th | Vacant | Vacancy in term | John A. McClernand (D) | Seated November 8, 1859 |
| Kentucky 5th | Vacant | Brown could not take seat because he had not yet attained age required by the US Constitution | John Y. Brown (D) | Seated December 3, 1860 |
| Ohio 14th | Cyrus Spink (R) | Died May 31, 1859 | Harrison G. O. Blake (R) | Seated October 11, 1859 |
| Virginia 4th | William Goode (D) | Died July 3, 1859 | Roger A. Pryor (D) | Seated December 7, 1859 |
| Michigan 1st | George B. Cooper (D) | Lost contested election May 15, 1860 | Francis P. Blair Jr. (R) | Seated May 15, 1860 |
| Nebraska Territory At-large | Experience Estabrook | Lost contested election May 18, 1860 | Samuel G. Daily (R) | Seated May 18, 1860 |
| New York 31st | Silas M. Burroughs (R) | Died June 3, 1860 | Edwin R. Reynolds (R) | Seated December 5, 1860 |
| Missouri 1st | John R. Barret (D) | Lost contested election June 8, 1860 | William A. Howard (R) | Seated June 8, 1860 |
| Pennsylvania 8th | John Schwartz (ALD) | Died June 20, 1860 | Jacob K. McKenty (D) | Seated December 3, 1860 |
| Missouri 1st | William A. Howard (R) | Resigned June 25, 1860 | John R. Barret (D) | Seated December 3, 1860 |
| Mississippi 1st | Lucius Q. C. Lamar II (D) | Retired December ???, 1860 | Vacant | Not filled this term |
| South Carolina 3rd | Laurence M. Keitt (D) | Retired December ???, 1860 | Vacant | Not filled this term |
| South Carolina 1st | John McQueen (D) | Retired December 21, 1860 | Vacant | Not filled this term |
| South Carolina 2nd | William P. Miles (D) | Retired December 21, 1860 | Vacant | Not filled this term |
| South Carolina 4th | Milledge L. Bonham (D) | Retired December 21, 1860 | Vacant | Not filled this term |
| South Carolina 5th | John D. Ashmore (D) | Retired December 21, 1860 | Vacant | Not filled this term |
| South Carolina 6th | William W. Boyce (D) | Retired December 21, 1860 | Vacant | Not filled this term |
| Maine 5th | Israel Washburn Jr. (R) | Resigned January 1, 1861, after being elected Governor of Maine | Stephen Coburn (R) | Seated January 2, 1861 |
| Mississippi 2nd | Reuben Davis (D) | Withdrew January 12, 1861 | Vacant | Not filled this term |
| Mississippi 3rd | William Barksdale (D) | Withdrew January 12, 1861 | Vacant | Not filled this term |
| Mississippi 4th | Otho R. Singleton (D) | Withdrew January 12, 1861 | Vacant | Not filled this term |
| Mississippi 5th | John J. McRae (D) | Withdrew January 12, 1861 | Vacant | Not filled this term |
| Alabama 1st | James A. Stallworth (D) | Withdrew January 21, 1861 | Vacant | Not filled this term |
| Alabama 2nd | James L. Pugh (D) | Withdrew January 21, 1861 | Vacant | Not filled this term |
| Alabama 3rd | David Clopton (D) | Withdrew January 21, 1861 | Vacant | Not filled this term |
| Alabama 4th | Sydenham Moore (D) | Withdrew January 21, 1861 | Vacant | Not filled this term |
| Alabama 5th | George S. Houston (D) | Withdrew January 21, 1861 | Vacant | Not filled this term |
| Alabama 7th | Jabez L. M. Curry (D) | Withdrew January 21, 1861 | Vacant | Not filled this term |
| Florida At-large | George S. Hawkins (D) | Withdrew January 21, 1861 | Vacant | Not filled this term |
| Georgia 1st | Peter E. Love (D) | Retired January 23, 1861 | Vacant | Not filled this term |
| Georgia 2nd | Martin J. Crawford (D) | Withdrew January 23, 1861 | Vacant | Not filled this term |
| Georgia 3rd | Thomas Hardeman Jr. (O) | Withdrew January 23, 1861 | Vacant | Not filled this term |
| Georgia 4th | Lucius J. Gartrell (D) | Retired January 23, 1861 | Vacant | Not filled this term |
| Georgia 5th | John W. H. Underwood (D) | Withdrew January 23, 1861 | Vacant | Not filled this term |
| Georgia 6th | James Jackson (D) | Retired January 23, 1861 | Vacant | Not filled this term |
| Georgia 7th | Joshua Hill (O) | Resigned January 23, 1861 | Vacant | Not filled this term |
| Georgia 8th | John J. Jones (D) | Withdrew January 23, 1861 | Vacant | Not filled this term |
| Kansas Territory At-large | Marcus J. Parrott (R) | Kansas was admitted to the Union January 29, 1861 | Seat eliminated | |
| Kansas At-large | New Seat | Kansas was admitted to the Union January 29, 1861 | Martin F. Conway (R) | Seated January 29, 1861 |
| Alabama 6th | Williamson R. W. Cobb (D) | Withdrew January 30, 1861 | Vacant | Not filled this term |
| Louisiana 2nd | Miles Taylor (D) | Withdrew February 5, 1861 | Vacant | Not filled this term |

== Committees ==
Lists of committees and their party leaders.

=== Senate ===
- Alter and Improve Senate Chamber (Select)
- Amendments to the Constitution (Select)
- Audit and Control the Contingent Expenses of the Senate (Chairman: Andrew Johnson)
- Banks of the District of Columbia (Select)
- Circulation of Bank Notes in the District of Columbia (Select)
- Claims (Chairman: Alfred Iverson Jr.)
- Commerce (Chairman: Clement Claiborne Clay)
- Comptroller William Medill (Select)
- Distributing Public Revenue Among the States (Select)
- District of Columbia (Chairman: Albert G. Brown)
- Duties of Imports (Select)
- Finance (Chairman: Robert M. T. Hunter)
- Foreign Relations (Chairman: James M. Mason)
- French Spoilations (Select)
- Harpers Ferry Invasion (Select)
- Indian Affairs (Chairman: William K. Sebastian)
- Judiciary (Chairman: James A. Bayard Jr.)
- Memorial of Houmas Lands Settlers (Select)
- Military Affairs (Chairman: Jefferson Davis)
- Naval Affairs (Chairman: Stephen Mallory)
- Ordnance and War Ships (Select)
- Pacific Railroad (Select)
- Patents and the Patent Office (Chairman: William Bigler)
- Pensions (Chairman: N/A)
- Post Office and Post Roads (Chairman: N/A)
- Printing (Chairman: N/A)
- Public Printing Investigation (Select)
- Private Land Claims (Chairman: N/A)
- Public Lands (Chairman: Robert W. Johnson)
- Retrenchment (Chairman: N/A)
- Revolutionary Claims (Chairman: N/A)
- Tariff Regulation (Select)
- Territories (Chairman: N/A)
- Thirteen on the Disturbed Condition of the Country (Select)
- Whole

=== House of Representatives ===
- Accounts (Chairman: Francis E. Spinner)
- Agriculture (Chairman: Martin Butterfield)
- Claims (Chairman: John Hickman)
- Commerce (Chairman: Elihu B. Washburne)
- District of Columbia (Chairman: Luther C. Carter)
- Elections (Chairman: John A. Gilmer)
- Engraving (Chairman: Garnett B. Adrain)
- Expenditures in the Interior Department (Chairman: N/A)
- Expenditures in the Navy Department (Chairman: Robert Hatton)
- Expenditures in the Post Office Department (Chairman: George W. Palmer)
- Expenditures in the State Department (Chairman: James B. McKean)
- Expenditures in the Treasury Department (Chairman: Dwight Loomis)
- Expenditures in the War Department (Chairman: William Stewart)
- Expenditures on Public Buildings (Chairman: William D. Brayton)
- Foreign Affairs (Chairman: Thomas Corwin)
- Indian Affairs (Chairman: Emerson Etheridge)
- Invalid Pensions (Chairman: Reuben E. Fenton)
- Judiciary (Chairman: John Hickman)
- Manufactures (Chairman: Charles F. Adams)
- Mileage (Chairman: John D. Ashmore)
- Military Affairs (Chairman: Benjamin Stanton)
- Militia (Chairman: Cydnor B. Tompkins)
- Naval Affairs (Chairman: Freeman H. Morse)
- Patents (Chairman: William Millward)
- Post Office and Post Roads (Chairman: Schuyler Colfax)
- Private Land Claims (Chairman: Cadwallader C. Washburn)
- Public Buildings and Grounds (Chairman: Charles R. Train)
- Public Expenditures (Chairman: John B. Haskin)
- Public Lands (Chairman: Eli Thayer)
- Revisal and Unfinished Business (Chairman: John A. Logan)
- Revolutionary Claims (Chairman: George N. Briggs)
- Revolutionary Pensions (Chairman: John F. Potter)
- Roads and Canals (Chairman: Robert Mallory)
- Rules (Select)
- Standards of Official Conduct
- Territories (Chairman: Galusha A. Grow)
- Ways and Means (Chairman: John Sherman)
- Whole

=== Joint committees ===
- Enrolled Bills (Chairman: Sen. Henry Haun then Sen. Willard Saulsbury Sr.)
- The Library (Chairman: Rep. John U. Pettit)
- Printing (Chairman: Rep. John A. Gurley)
- Making Arrangements for Inaugurating Washington's Statue

== Caucuses ==
- Democratic (House)
- Democratic (Senate)

== Employees ==
=== Legislative branch agency directors ===
- Architect of the Capitol: Thomas U. Walter
- Librarian of Congress: John Silva Meehan

=== Senate ===
- Chaplain: Stephen P. Hill (Baptist), until December 15, 1859
  - Phineas D. Gurley (Presbyterian), elected December 15, 1859
- Secretary: Asbury Dickins
- Sergeant at Arms: Dunning R. McNair

=== House of Representatives ===
- Clerk: James C. Allen, until February 3, 1860
  - John W. Forney, elected February 3, 1860
- Chaplain: None
- Doorkeeper: Robert B. Hackney, until February 6, 1860
  - George Marston, elected February 6, 1860
- Messenger: Thaddeus Morrice
- Postmaster: Josiah M. Lucas
- Sergeant at Arms: Adam J. Glossbrenner, until February 3, 1860
  - Henry William Hoffman, from February 3, 1860

== See also ==
- 1858 United States elections (elections leading to this Congress)
  - 1858–59 United States Senate elections
  - 1858–59 United States House of Representatives elections
- 1860 United States elections (elections during this Congress, leading to the next Congress)
  - 1860 United States presidential election
  - 1860–61 United States Senate elections
  - 1860–61 United States House of Representatives elections
