= List of United States representatives in the 38th Congress =

This is a complete list of United States representatives during the 38th United States Congress listed by seniority.

As an historical article, the districts and party affiliations listed reflect those during the 38th Congress (March 4, 1863 – March 3, 1865). Seats and party affiliations on similar lists for other congresses will be different for certain members.

Seniority depends on the date on which members were sworn into office. Since many members are sworn in on the same day, subsequent ranking is based on previous congressional service of the individual and then by alphabetical order by the last name of the representative.

Committee chairmanship in the House is often associated with seniority. However, party leadership is typically not associated with seniority.

Note: The "*" indicates that the representative/delegate may have served one or more non-consecutive terms while in the House of Representatives of the United States Congress.

== U.S. House seniority list ==
Rank	Representative	Party	District	Seniority date (Previous service, if any)	No.# of term(s)	Notes
1	Elihu B. Washburne	R	IL-03	March 4, 1853	6th term	Dean of the House
2	Schuyler Colfax	R	IN-09	March 4, 1855	5th term	Speaker of the House
3	Justin S. Morrill	R	VT-02	March 4, 1855	5th term	
4	Samuel S. Cox	D	OH-07	March 4, 1857	4th term	
5	Henry L. Dawes	R	MA-10	March 4, 1857	4th term	
6	Reuben Fenton	R	NY-31	March 4, 1857; Previous service: 1853–1855	5th term*	Resigned on December 20, 1864.
7	Owen Lovejoy	R	IL-05	March 4, 1857	4th term	Died on March 25, 1864.
8	George H. Pendleton	D	OH-01	March 4, 1857	4th term	
9	Daniel W. Gooch	R	MA-06	January 31, 1858	4th term	
10	John B. Alley	R	MA-05	March 4, 1859	3rd term	
11	James M. Ashley	R	OH-10	March 4, 1859	3rd term	
12	Thomas D. Eliot	R	MA-01	March 4, 1859; Previous service: 1854–1855	4th term*	
13	Augustus Frank	R	NY-29	March 4, 1859	3rd term	
14	James T. Hale	R	PA-18	March 4, 1859	3rd term	
15	William S. Holman	D	IN-04	March 4, 1859	3rd term	
16	Francis William Kellogg	R	MI-04	March 4, 1859	3rd term	
17	Robert Mallory	U	KY-05	March 4, 1859	3rd term	
18	James K. Moorhead	R	PA-22	March 4, 1859	3rd term	
19	John W. Noell	U	MO-03	March 4, 1859	3rd term	Died on March 14, 1863.
20	Alexander H. Rice	R	MA-03	March 4, 1859	3rd term	
21	James C. Robinson	D	IL-11	March 4, 1859	3rd term	
22	Thaddeus Stevens	R	PA-09	March 4, 1859; Previous service: 1849–1853	5th term*	
23	Edwin H. Webster	UU	MD-02	March 4, 1859	3rd term	
24	William Windom	R	MN-01	March 4, 1859	3rd term	
25	Sydenham E. Ancona	D	PA-08	March 4, 1861	2nd term	
26	Isaac N. Arnold	R	IL-01	March 4, 1861	2nd term	
27	Joseph Bailey	D	PA-15	March 4, 1861	2nd term	
28	Portus Baxter	R	VT-03	March 4, 1861	2nd term	
29	Fernando C. Beaman	R	MI-01	March 4, 1861	2nd term	
30	Francis Preston Blair Jr.	R	MO-01	March 4, 1861; Previous service: 1857–1859 and 1860	4th term**	Resigned on June 10, 1864.
31	Ambrose W. Clark	R	NY-20	March 4, 1861	2nd term	
32	Erastus Corning	D	NY-14	March 4, 1861; Previous service: 1857–1859	3rd term*	Resigned on October 5, 1863.
33	James A. Cravens	D	IN-02	March 4, 1861	2nd term	
34	James E. English	D	CT-02	March 4, 1861	2nd term	
35	Henry Grider	U	KY-03	March 4, 1861; Previous service: 1843–1847	4th term*	
36	Aaron Harding	U	KY-04	March 4, 1861	2nd term	
37	Philip Johnson	D	PA-11	March 4, 1861	2nd term	
38	George W. Julian	R	IN-05	March 4, 1861; Previous service: 1849–1851	3rd term*	
39	William D. Kelley	R	PA-04	March 4, 1861	2nd term	
40	John Law	D	IN-01	March 4, 1861	2nd term	
41	Jesse Lazear	D	PA-24	March 4, 1861	2nd term	
42	James R. Morris	D	OH-15	March 4, 1861	2nd term	
43	Warren P. Noble	D	OH-09	March 4, 1861	2nd term	
44	John B. Steele	D	NY-13	March 4, 1861	2nd term	
45	Moses F. Odell	D	NY-03	March 4, 1861	2nd term	
46	Nehemiah Perry	D	NJ-05	March 4, 1861	2nd term	
47	Frederick A. Pike	R	ME-05	March 4, 1861	2nd term	
48	Theodore M. Pomeroy	R	NY-24	March 4, 1861	2nd term	
49	John H. Rice	R	ME-04	March 4, 1861	2nd term	
50	Edward H. Rollins	R	NH-02	March 4, 1861	2nd term	
51	James S. Rollins	U	MO-09	March 4, 1861	2nd term	
52	William G. Steele	D	NJ-03	March 4, 1861	2nd term	
53	Francis Thomas	UU	MD-04	March 4, 1861; Previous service: 1831–1841	7th term*	
54	Robert B. Van Valkenburgh	R	NY-27	March 4, 1861	2nd term	
55	Daniel W. Voorhees	D	IN-07	March 4, 1861	2nd term	
56	William H. Wadsworth	U	KY-09	March 4, 1861	2nd term	
57	Elijah Ward	D	NY-06	March 4, 1861; Previous service: 1857–1859	3rd term*	
58	Chilton A. White	D	OH-06	March 4, 1861	2nd term	
59	Benjamin Wood	D	NY-04	March 4, 1861	2nd term	
60	James F. Wilson	R	IA-01	October 8, 1861	2nd term	
61	Samuel Hooper	R	MA-04	December 2, 1861	2nd term	
62	Anthony L. Knapp	D	IL-10	December 12, 1861	2nd term	
63	William A. Hall	U	MO-08	January 20, 1862	2nd term	
64	William J. Allen	D	IL-13	June 2, 1862	2nd term	
65	John D. Stiles	D	PA-06	June 3, 1862	2nd term	
66	George H. Yeaman	U	KY-02	December 1, 1862	2nd term	
67	Walter D. McIndoe	R	WI-06	January 26, 1863	2nd term	
68	James C. Allen	D	IL	March 4, 1863; Previous service: 1853–1856 and 1856-1857	4th term**	
69	William B. Allison	R	IA-03	March 4, 1863	1st term	
70	Oakes Ames	R	MA-02	March 4, 1863	1st term	
71	Lucien Anderson	UU	KY-01	March 4, 1863	1st term	
72	Augustus C. Baldwin	D	MI-05	March 4, 1863	1st term	
73	John D. Baldwin	R	MA-08	March 4, 1863	1st term	
74	James G. Blaine	R	ME-03	March 4, 1863	1st term	
75	George Bliss	D	OH-14	March 4, 1863; Previous service: 1853–1855	2nd term*	
76	Henry T. Blow	U	MO-02	March 4, 1863	1st term	
77	George S. Boutwell	R	MA-07	March 4, 1863	1st term	
78	Sempronius H. Boyd	U	MO-04	March 4, 1863	1st term	
79	Augustus Brandegee	R	CT-03	March 4, 1863	1st term	
80	James Brooks	D	NY-08	March 4, 1863; Previous service: 1849–1853	3rd term*	
81	John Martin Broomall	R	PA-07	March 4, 1863	1st term	
82	James S. Brown	D	WI-01	March 4, 1863	1st term	
83	John W. Chanler	D	NY-07	March 4, 1863	1st term	
84	Freeman Clarke	R	NY-28	March 4, 1863	1st term	
85	Brutus J. Clay	U	KY-07	March 4, 1863	1st term	
86	John Creswell	UU	MD-01	March 4, 1863	1st term	
87	Amasa Cobb	R	WI-03	March 4, 1863	1st term	
88	Alexander Hamilton Coffroth	D	PA-16	March 4, 1863	1st term	
89	Cornelius Cole	R	CA	March 4, 1863	1st term	
90	John L. Dawson	D	PA-21	March 4, 1863; Previous service: 1851–1855	3rd term*	
91	Henry W. Davis	UU	MD-03	March 4, 1863; Previous service: 1855–1861	4th term*	
92	Thomas T. Davis	R	NY-23	March 4, 1863	1st term	
93	Henry C. Deming	R	CT-01	March 4, 1863	1st term	
94	Charles Denison	D	PA-12	March 4, 1863	1st term	
95	Nathan F. Dixon II	R	RI-02	March 4, 1863; Previous service: 1849–1851	2nd term*	
96	Ignatius L. Donnelly	R	MN-02	March 4, 1863	1st term	
97	John F. Driggs	R	MI-06	March 4, 1863	1st term	
98	Ebenezer Dumont	R	IN-06	March 4, 1863	1st term	
99	Josiah B. Grinnell	R	IA-04	March 4, 1863	1st term	
100	John R. Eden	D	IL-07	March 4, 1863	1st term	
101	Joseph K. Edgerton	D	IN-10	March 4, 1863	1st term	
102	Charles A. Eldredge	D	WI-04	March 4, 1863	1st term	
103	John F. Farnsworth	R	IL-02	March 4, 1863; Previous service: 1857–1861	3rd term*	
104	William E. Finck	D	OH-12	March 4, 1863	1st term	
105	John Ganson	D	NY-30	March 4, 1863	1st term	
106	James A. Garfield	R	OH-19	March 4, 1863	1st term	
107	John A. Griswold	D	NY-15	March 4, 1863	1st term	
108	Ephraim R. Eckley	R	OH-17	March 4, 1863	1st term	
109	Benjamin Gwinn Harris	D	MD-05	March 4, 1863	1st term	
110	Charles M. Harris	D	IL-04	March 4, 1863	1st term	
111	Henry W. Harrington	D	IN-03	March 4, 1863	1st term	
112	Anson Herrick	D	NY-09	March 4, 1863	1st term	
113	William Higby	R	CA	March 4, 1863	1st term	
114	Giles W. Hotchkiss	R	NY-26	March 4, 1863	1st term	
115	Asahel W. Hubbard	R	IA-06	March 4, 1863	1st term	
116	John H. Hubbard	R	CT-04	March 4, 1863	1st term	
117	Calvin T. Hulburd	R	NY-17	March 4, 1863	1st term	
118	Wells A. Hutchins	D	OH-11	March 4, 1863	1st term	
119	Thomas Jenckes	R	RI-01	March 4, 1863	1st term	
120	William Johnston	D	OH-08	March 4, 1863	1st term	
121	John A. Kasson	R	IA-05	March 4, 1863	1st term	
122	Martin Kalbfleisch	D	NY-02	March 4, 1863	1st term	
123	Orlando Kellogg	R	NY-16	March 4, 1863; Previous service: 1847–1849	2nd term*	
124	Francis Kernan	D	NY-21	March 4, 1863	1st term	
125	Austin A. King	U	MO-06	March 4, 1863	1st term	
126	Francis Celeste Le Blond	D	OH-05	March 4, 1863	1st term	
127	DeWitt Clinton Littlejohn	R	NY-22	March 4, 1863	1st term	
128	Benjamin F. Loan	U	MO-07	March 4, 1863	1st term	
129	Alexander Long	D	OH-02	March 4, 1863	1st term	
130	John W. Longyear	R	MI-03	March 4, 1863	1st term	
131	Daniel Marcy	D	NH-01	March 4, 1863	1st term	
132	James M. Marvin	R	NY-18	March 4, 1863	1st term	
133	Archibald McAllister	D	PA-17	March 4, 1863	1st term	
134	John R. McBride	R	OR	March 4, 1863	1st term	
135	Joseph W. McClurg	U	MO-05	March 4, 1863	1st term	
136	James F. McDowell	D	IN-11	March 4, 1863	1st term	
137	John F. McKinney	D	OH-04	March 4, 1863	1st term	
138	George Middleton	D	NJ-02	March 4, 1863	1st term	
139	William H. Miller	D	PA-14	March 4, 1863	1st term	
140	Samuel F. Miller	R	NY-19	March 4, 1863	1st term	
141	Daniel Morris	R	NY-25	March 4, 1863	1st term	
142	William R. Morrison	D	IL-12	March 4, 1863	1st term	
143	Amos Myers	R	PA-20	March 4, 1863	1st term	
144	Leonard Myers	R	PA-03	March 4, 1863	1st term	
145	Homer A. Nelson	D	NY-12	March 4, 1863	1st term	
146	Jesse O. Norton	R	IL-06	March 4, 1863; Previous service: 1853–1857	3rd term*	
147	Charles O'Neill	R	PA-02	March 4, 1863	1st term	
148	John O'Neill	D	OH-13	March 4, 1863	1st term	
149	Godlove Stein Orth	R	IN-08	March 4, 1863	1st term	
150	James W. Patterson	R	NH-03	March 4, 1863	1st term	
151	Sidney Perham	R	ME-02	March 4, 1863	1st term	
152	Hiram Price	R	IA-02	March 4, 1863	1st term	
153	William Radford	D	NY-10	March 4, 1863	1st term	
154	Samuel J. Randall	D	PA-01	March 4, 1863	1st term	
155	William H. Randall	UU	KY-08	March 4, 1863	1st term	
156	Andrew J. Rogers	D	NJ-04	March 4, 1863	1st term	
157	Lewis Winans Ross	D	IL-09	March 4, 1863	1st term	
158	Robert C. Schenck	R	OH-03	March 4, 1863; Previous service: 1843–1851	5th term*	
159	Glenni W. Scofield	R	PA-19	March 4, 1863	1st term	
160	Thomas B. Shannon	R	CA	March 4, 1863	1st term	
161	Ithamar Sloan	R	WI-02	March 4, 1863	1st term	
162	Green C. Smith	UU	KY-06	March 4, 1863	1st term	
163	Rufus P. Spalding	R	OH-18	March 4, 1863	1st term	
164	John F. Starr	R	NJ-01	March 4, 1863	1st term	
165	Henry G. Stebbins	D	NY-01	March 4, 1863	1st term	Resigned on October 24, 1864.
166	Myer Strouse	D	PA-10	March 4, 1863	1st term	
167	John T. Stuart	D	IL-08	March 4, 1863; Previous service: 1839–1843	3rd term*	
168	Lorenzo De Medici Sweat	D	ME-01	March 4, 1863	1st term	
169	William Temple	D	DE	March 4, 1863	1st term	Died on May 28, 1863.
170	Martin R. Thayer	R	PA-05	March 4, 1863	1st term	
171	Henry W. Tracy	R	PA-13	March 4, 1863	1st term	
172	Charles Upson	R	MI-02	March 4, 1863	1st term	
173	William B. Washburn	R	MA-09	March 4, 1863	1st term	
174	Ezra Wheeler	D	WI-05	March 4, 1863	1st term	
175	Joseph W. White	D	OH-16	March 4, 1863	1st term	
176	Abel C. Wilder	R	KS	March 4, 1863	1st term	
177	Thomas Williams	R	PA-23	March 4, 1863	1st term	
178	Charles H. Winfield	D	NY-11	March 4, 1863	1st term	
179	Fernando Wood	D	NY-05	March 4, 1863; Previous service: 1841–1843	2nd term*	
180	Frederick E. Woodbridge	R	VT-01	March 4, 1863	1st term	
—	William G. Brown, Sr.	U	WV-02	December 7, 1863; Previous service: 1845–1849 and 1861–1863	4th term**	
—	John V. L. Pruyn	D	NY-14	December 7, 1863	1st term	
—	John G. Scott	D	MO-03	December 7, 1863	1st term	
—	Nathaniel B. Smithers	U	DE	December 7, 1863	1st term	
—	Kellian Whaley	U	WV-03	December 7, 1863; Previous service: 1861–1863	2nd term*	
—	Jacob B. Blair	U	WV-01	December 17, 1863; Previous service: 1861–1863	2nd term*	
—	Ebon C. Ingersoll	R	IL-05	May 20, 1864	1st term	
—	Samuel Knox	U	MO-01	June 10, 1864	1st term	
—	Henry G. Worthington	R	NV	October 31, 1864	1st term	
—	Dwight Townsend	D	NY-01	December 5, 1864	1st term	

== Delegates ==
Rank	Delegate	Party	District	Seniority date (Previous service, if any)	No.# of term(s)	Notes
1	Samuel Gordon Daily	R	NE	May 18, 1860	3rd term	
2	Hiram Pitt Bennet	R	CO	August 19, 1861	2nd term	
3	George Edward Cole	D	WA	March 4, 1863	1st term	
4	William Jayne		DAK	March 4, 1863	1st term	
5	John F. Kinney	D	UT	March 4, 1863	1st term	
6	Gordon Newell Mott	R	NV	March 4, 1863	1st term	
7	Francisco Perea	R	NM	March 4, 1863	1st term	
	William H. Wallace	R	ID	February 1, 1864; Previous service, 1861–1863.	2nd term*	
	John Blair Smith Todd	D	DAK	June 17, 1864; Previous service, 1861–1863.	2nd term*	
	Charles Debrille Poston	R	AZ	December 5, 1864	1st term	
	Samuel McLean	D	MT	January 6, 1865	1st term	

== See also ==
- 38th United States Congress
- List of United States congressional districts
- List of United States senators in the 38th Congress
