= List of United States senators in the 38th Congress =

This is a complete list of United States senators during the 38th United States Congress listed by seniority from March 4, 1863, to March 3, 1865.

Order of service is based on the commencement of the senator's first term. Behind this is former service as a senator (only giving the senator seniority within their new incoming class), service as vice president, a House member, a cabinet secretary, or a governor of a state. The final factor is the population of the senator's state.

Senators who were sworn in during the middle of the Congress (up until the last senator who was not sworn in early after winning the November 1864 election) are listed at the end of the list with no number.

== Terms of service ==
Class	Terms of service of senators that expired in years
Class 2	Terms of service of senators that expired in 1865 (AL, AR, CO, DE, GA, IA, IL, KS, KY, LA, MA, ME, MI, MN, MS, NC, NH, NJ, OR, RI, SC, TN, TX, VA, and WV.)
Class 3	Terms of service of senators that expired in 1867 (CA, CT, DE, FL, IN, MA, MD, ME, MI, MN, MO, MS, NJ, NV, NY, OH, PA, RI, TN, TX, VA, VT, WI, and WV)
Class 1	Terms of service of senators that expired in 1869 (AL, AR, CA, CT, FL, GA, IA, IL, IN, KS, KY, LA, MD, MO, NC, NH, NV, NY, OH, OR, PA, SC, VT, and WI.)

== U.S. Senate seniority list ==
U.S. Senate seniority
Rank	Senator (party-state)	Seniority date	Other factors
1	Solomon Foot (R-VT)	March 4, 1851	
2	James A. Bayard Jr. (D-DE)	March 4, 1851	
3	Benjamin Wade (R-OH)	March 15, 1851	
4	Charles Sumner (LR-MA)	April 11, 1851	
5	William P. Fessenden (R-ME)	February 10, 1854	
6	Henry Wilson (R-MA)	January 31, 1855	
7	Lyman Trumbull (R-IL)	March 4, 1855	
8	Jacob Collamer (R-VT)	March 4, 1855	
9	Lafayette S. Foster (R-CT)	March 4, 1855	
10	John P. Hale (R-NH)	July 30, 1855	
11	James Harlan (R-IA)	January 29, 1857	
12	Zachariah Chandler (R-MI)	March 4, 1857	
13	James Dixon (R-CT)	March 4, 1857	
14	James R. Doolittle (R-WI)	March 4, 1857	
15	Daniel Clark (R-NH)	June 27, 1857	
16	Henry B. Anthony (R-RI)	March 4, 1859	Former governor
17	Willard Saulsbury Sr. (D-DE)	March 4, 1859	
18	James W. Grimes (R-IA)	March 4, 1859	
19	Lazarus W. Powell (D-KY)	March 4, 1859	
20	Morton S. Wilkinson (R-MN)	March 4, 1859	
21	John C. Ten Eyck (R-NJ)	March 4, 1859	
22	Timothy O. Howe (R-WI)	March 4, 1861	
23	James A. McDougall (D-CA)	March 4, 1861	
24	Henry S. Lane (R-WI)	March 4, 1861	
25	Ira Harris (R-NJ)	March 4, 1861	
26	James Nesmith (D-OR)	March 4, 1861	
27	Edgar Cowan (R-PA)	March 4, 1861	
28	John Sherman (R-OH)	March 21, 1861	
29	Samuel C. Pomeroy (R-KS)	April 4, 1861	
30	Jim Lane (R-KS)	April 4, 1861	
31	John S. Carlile (U-VA)	July 9, 1861	
32	Waitman T. Willey (U-VA)	July 9, 1861	
33	Garrett Davis (D-KY)	December 23, 1861	
34	Jacob M. Howard (R-MI)	January 17, 1862	
35	John B. Henderson (UU-MO)	January 17, 1862	
36	Robert Wilson (UU-MO)	January 17, 1862	
37	Benjamin F. Harding (D-OR)	September 12, 1862	
38	Thomas H. Hicks (UU-MD)	December 29, 1862	
39	William A. Richardson (R-IL)	January 12, 1863	
40	Alexander Ramsey (R-MN)	March 4, 1863	
41	William Sprague IV (R-RI)	March 4, 1863	
42	John Conness (R-CA)	March 4, 1863	
43	Thomas A. Hendricks (D-IN)	March 4, 1863	
44	Reverdy Johnson (UU-MD)	March 4, 1863	
45	Edwin D. Morgan (R-NY)	March 4, 1863	
46	Charles R. Buckalew (D-PA)	March 4, 1863	
47	William Wright (D-NJ)	March 4, 1863	
48	Lemuel J. Bowden (UU-VA)	March 4, 1863	
	Waitman T. Willey (R-VA)	August 4, 1863	
	Peter G. Van Winkle (R-WV)	August 4, 1863	
	Benjamin G. Brown (UU-MO)	November 13, 1863	
	George R. Riddle (D-DE)	February 2, 1864	
	Nathan A. Farwell (R-ME)	October 27, 1864	
	William M. Stewart (R-NV)	February 1, 1865	
	James W. Nye (R-NV)	February 1, 1865	

== See also ==
- 38th United States Congress
- List of United States representatives in the 38th Congress
