= John R. Barret =

American politician (1825–1903)

John Richard Barret
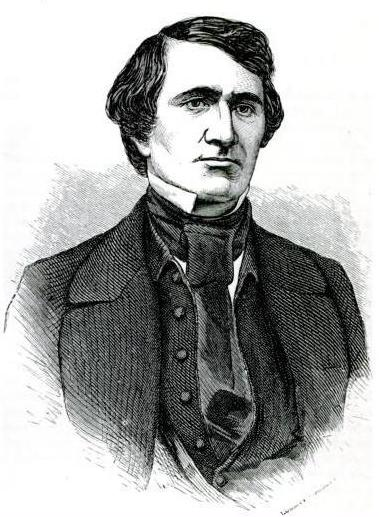

Member of the U.S. House of Representatives from Missouri's 1st district
- In office December 3, 1860 – March 4, 1861
- Preceded by: Francis Preston Blair Jr.
- Succeeded by: Francis Preston Blair Jr.
- In office March 4, 1859 – June 8, 1860
- Preceded by: Francis Preston Blair Jr.
- Succeeded by: Francis Preston Blair Jr.

Member of the Missouri House of Representatives
- In office 1852–1856

Personal details
- Born: August 21, 1825 Greensburg, Kentucky, U.S.
- Died: November 2, 1903 (aged 78) New York City, New York, U.S.
- Education: St. Louis University

John Richard Barret (August 21, 1825 – November 2, 1903) was a slave owner and U.S. Representative from Missouri.

Born in Greensburg, Kentucky, Barret attended the common schools and then went to Centre College in Danville, Kentucky. He moved to St. Louis, Missouri, in 1839 and graduated from law school at Saint Louis University in 1843. He thereafter studied and then practiced law.

Barret was elected to the state House of Representatives in 1852 and served four terms. He became identified with the St. Louis Agricultural Society and organized its exhibitions. After defeating incumbent Francis Preston Blair Jr. in 1858, he presented his credentials as a Democratic member-elect to the 36th Congress, but Blair contested the election. He served from March 4, 1859, to June 8, 1860, when Congress declared him not entitled to the seat on the grounds that there had been election irregularities (such as judges who had not taken the oath, ineligible voters, ballots for Blair that should have been counted but were not, and a difficult-to-explain increase in voters in a few precincts) and declared Blair entitled to it. Blair resigned 17 days later to set up a special election.

In a special election against Blair, Barret was subsequently sent again to the same Congress to fill the vacancy caused by Blair's resignation on June 25. Barret then served from December 3, 1860, to March 4, 1861. Blair successfully ran against him in the general election in 1860 for a seat in the 37th Congress.

Barret moved to New York City and engaged in numerous occupations, eventually dying there on November 2, 1903. He was interred in Cave Hill Cemetery in Louisville, Kentucky.

U.S. House of Representatives
Preceded by Francis Preston Blair Jr.	Member of the U.S. House of Representatives from Missouri's 1st congressional district 1859-1860	Succeeded by Francis Preston Blair Jr.
Preceded by Francis Preston Blair Jr.	Member of the U.S. House of Representatives from Missouri's 1st congressional district 1860-1861	Succeeded by Francis Preston Blair Jr.
