= Appoline Alexander Blair =

American philanthropist and hospital founder (1821–1908)

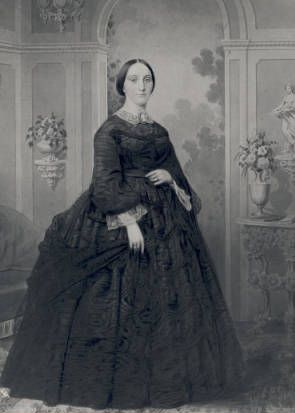
- Born: Appoline Agatha Alexander; September 14, 1828
- Died: September 5, 1908 (aged 79); St. Louis, Missouri, U.S.
- Resting place: Bellefontaine Cemetery; St. Louis, Missouri, U.S.
- Spouse: Francis Preston Blair Jr. (m. 1847; died 1875)
- Children: 8

Appoline Agatha Alexander Blair (née Alexander; September 14, 1828 – September 5, 1908) was an American philanthropist, hospital founder, and wife of Senator (and Civil War general) Francis Preston Blair Jr.

== Biography ==
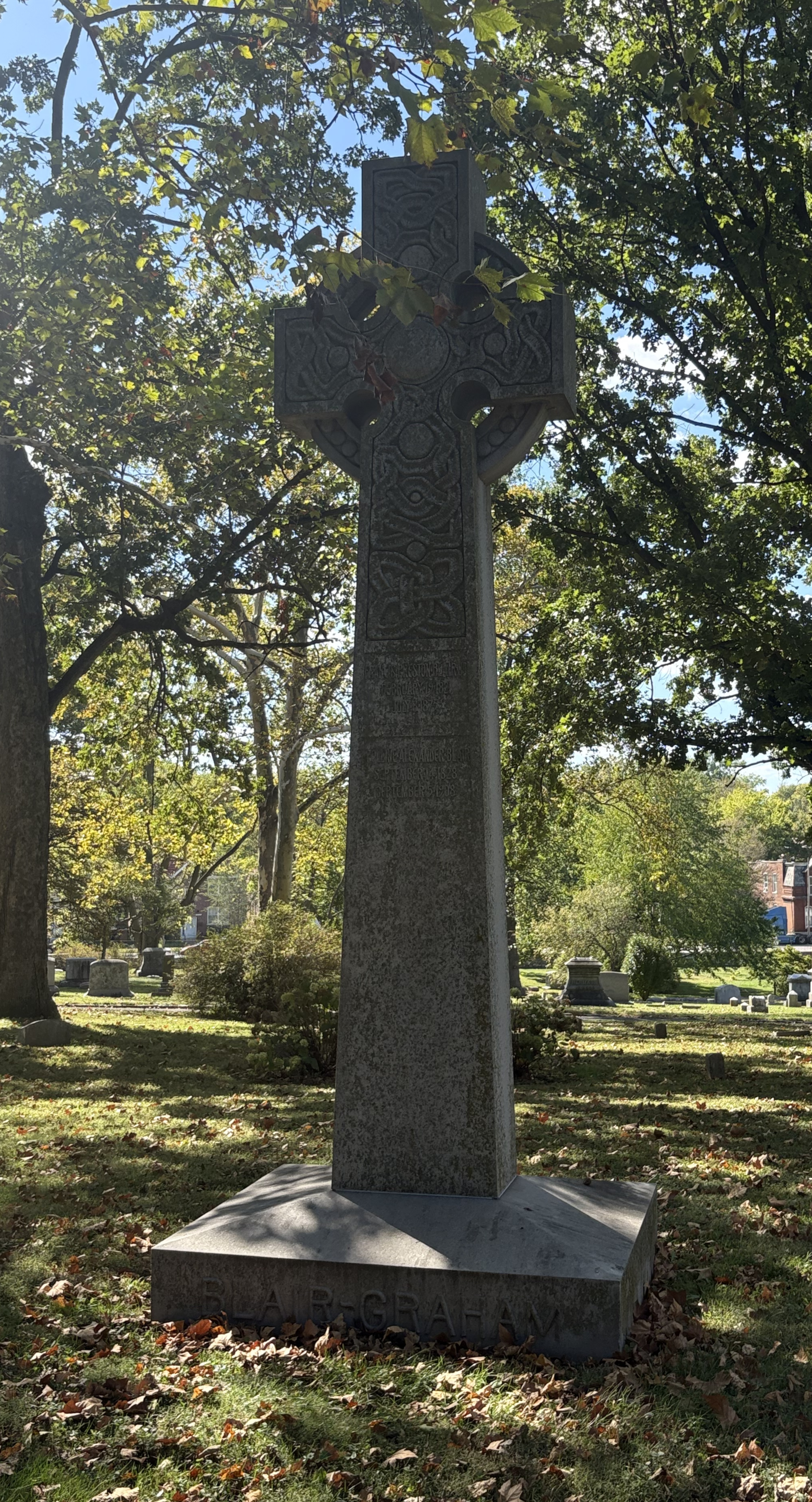
Graves of Appoline and Francis Blair at Bellefontaine Cemetery

Appoline Agatha Alexander was born to Andrew Alexander of Woodford County, Kentucky. She married Francis Preston Blair Jr. on September 8, 1847, and had eight children. In 1878, after losing two children to illness, Blair gathered a group of 20 prominent women and organized the St. Louis Children's Hospital, for which she served as the first president of the Board of Managers. She is credited with the creation of the St. John's Medical Center in Joplin, Missouri, in 1896. She died on September 5, 1908, at the home of her daughter in St. Louis.
