= John Hogan (Missouri politician) =

American politician (1805–1892)

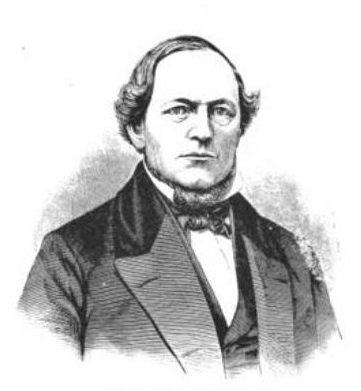

Member of the U.S. House of Representatives from Missouri's 1st district
- In office March 4, 1865 – March 3, 1867
- Preceded by: Samuel Knox
- Succeeded by: William A. Pile

Personal details
- Born: January 5, 1805 Mallow, County Cork, Ireland,
- Died: February 5, 1892 (aged 90) St. Louis, Missouri, U.S.

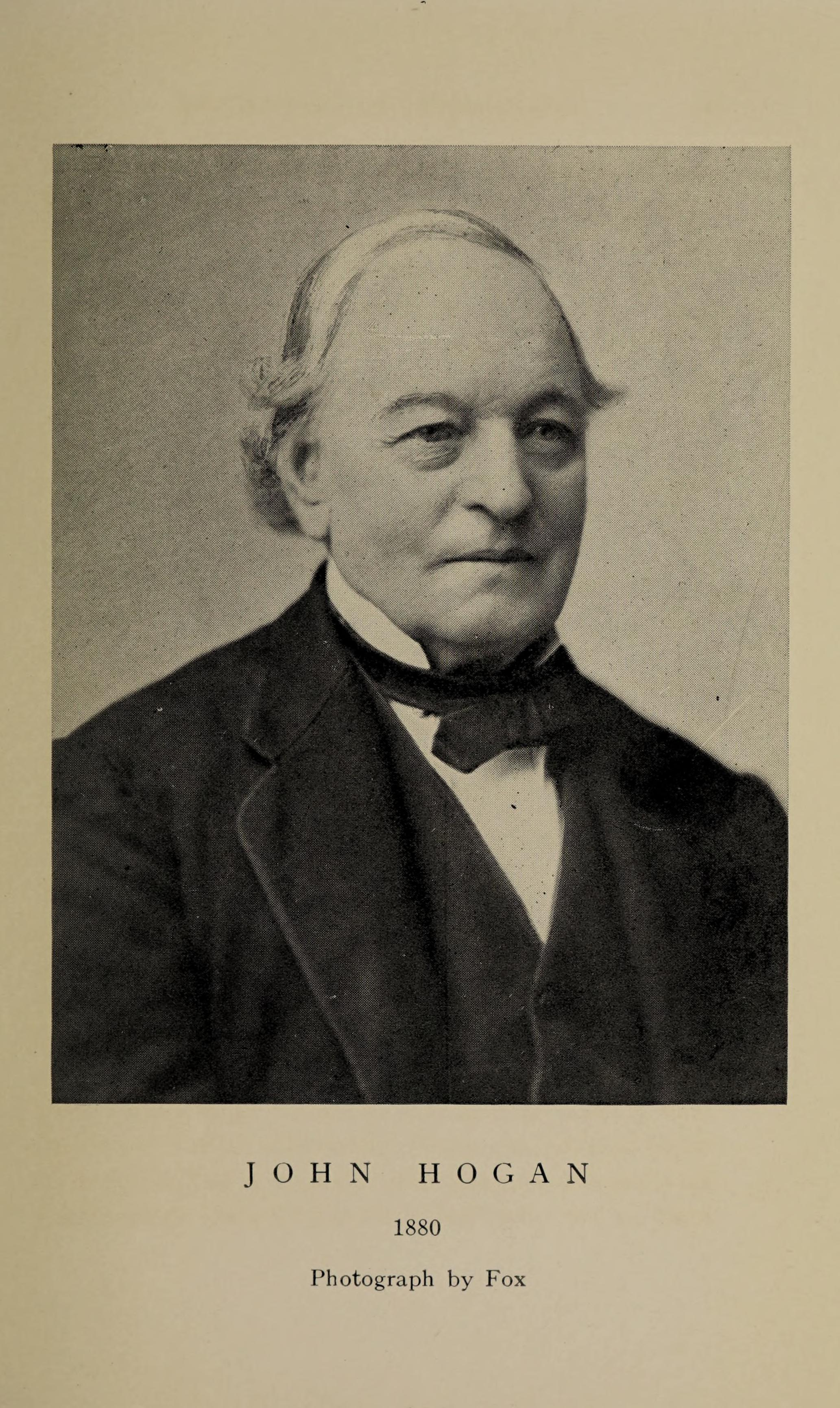
Rev. John Hogan, 1880

John Hogan (January 2, 1805 – February 5, 1892) was a businessman and politician in Illinois and Missouri, serving as a United States representative (D-MO) for one term.

== Biography ==
Born in Mallow, County Cork, Ireland, he immigrated to the United States in 1817 with his family and settled in Baltimore, Maryland. He was apprenticed to learn the shoemaker's trade, received a limited schooling, and became a licensed Methodist preacher before twenty years of age.

He went West in 1826 (to what is now the Midwest) and preached in the Illinois conference. He entered the general merchandise business in Madison, Illinois in 1831, served as president of the Illinois Board of Public Works from 1834 to 1837, and was elected as a member of the Illinois House of Representatives in 1836.

Hogan was an unsuccessful Whig candidate for Congress in 1838. He was appointed as register of the United States General Land Office at Dixon, Illinois, serving from 1841 to 1845. He moved to St. Louis, Missouri and engaged in the wholesale grocery business. He was appointed as US postmaster of St. Louis, serving from 1857 to 1861.

Hogan was elected as a Democrat from St. Louis to the Thirty-ninth Congress (March 4, 1865 – March 3, 1867). He was an unsuccessful candidate in 1866 for reelection to the Fortieth Congress. He died aged 90 in St. Louis in 1892 and was buried at Bellefontaine Cemetery.

U.S. House of Representatives
| Preceded by Samuel Knox | Member of the U.S. House of Representatives from Missouri's 1st congressional district 1865–1867 | Succeeded by William A. Pile |
