= Alpine Community Church =

Coordinates: 34°27′41.11″N 85°29′1.47″W

- Location: Menlo, Georgia

History
- Former name: Alpine Presbyterian Church
- Founded: 1853

Alpine Community Church, originally known as Alpine Presbyterian Church, was built in 1853. It is located on Highway 337 in Menlo, Georgia.

== History ==
The land was provided by Robert Boyles and Samuel Knox, who were also among the 36 people that signed the petition sent to the Presbytery asking them to appoint a committee to organize a church. When the petition was granted, Rev. A.Y. Lockridge, and Rev. A.D. Johnson with Elders D.M. Montgomery, Benjamin Brannon, and Kinsey Smith, were appointed by the Presbytery, to organize the church. Robert Boyles, C.M. Barry, W. Graves and John B. Knox were elected Ruling Elders by ballot after the first service was held on the Saturday before Sabbath in May, 1853.

The church was used by the Union men as a hospital during the American Civil War. Hugh Montgomery, a U.S. Indian Agent, is buried there. A historic marker that reads "Last Indian Agent" represents his grave in the cemetery located behind the church. Alpine Cemetery is one of the oldest cemeteries in Chattooga County.

The physical characteristics of Alpine Community Church remain much as they were in the 19th century. The church was constructed with two front doors, the men and women would enter separately and sit on opposite sides. A loft was built just above the entrance way for the slaves who attended service.

== Today ==
In November, 1986, Tommy Pledger became Pastor. Currently, Service are held every Sunday Morning at 11:00 am led by Pastor Jeremy Stroop. Alpine Community Church was recognized by the State of Georgia in 2003 for celebrating 150 years of dedicated service to the Chattooga County area.
