= 114th Ohio Infantry Regiment =

- Active: September 11, 1862, to July 31, 1865
- Country: United States
- Allegiance: Union
- Branch: Infantry
- Engagements: Battle of Arkansas Post; Battle of Port Gibson; Battle of Champion Hill; Siege of Vicksburg, May 19 & 22 assaults; Red River Campaign

The 114th Ohio Infantry Regiment, sometimes 114th Ohio Volunteer Infantry (or 114th OVI) was an infantry regiment in the Union Army during the American Civil War.

== Service ==
The 114th Ohio Infantry was organized at Camp Circleville in Circleville, Ohio, and mustered in for three years service on September 11, 1862, under the command of Colonel John Cradlebaugh.

The regiment was attached to 2nd Brigade, 9th Division, Right Wing XIII Corps (Old), Department of the Tennessee, to December 1862. 2nd Brigade, 3rd Division, Sherman's Yazoo Expedition, to January 1863. 2nd Brigade, 9th Division, XIII Corps, Army of the Tennessee, to July 1863. 4th Brigade, 1st Division, XIII Corps, Department of the Tennessee, to August 1863 and Department of the Gulf to September 1863. 3rd Brigade, 1st Division, XIII Corps, Department of the Gulf, to March 1864. 2nd Brigade, 1st Division, XIII Corps, to June 1864. 2nd Brigade, 3rd Division, XIX Corps, Department of the Gulf, to December 1864. 3rd Brigade, 2nd Division, Reserve Corps, Military Division West Mississippi, to February 1865. 3rd Brigade, 2nd Division, XIII Corps (New), Military Division West Mississippi, to July 1865.

The 114th Ohio Infantry mustered out of service at Houston, Texas, on July 31, 1865.

== Detailed service ==
Ordered to Marietta, Ohio, September 12; thence to Memphis, Tenn., December 1. Sherman's Yazoo Expedition December 20, 1862, to January 3, 1863. Chickasaw Bayou December 26–28, 1862. Chickasaw Bluff December 29. Expedition to Arkansas Post, Ark., January 3–10, 1863. Assault and capture of Fort Hindman, Arkansas Post, January 10–11. Moved to Young's Point, La., January 17–23, and duty there until March 8. Moved to Milliken's Bend, La., and duty there until April. Operations from Milliken's Bend to New Carthage March 31-April 17. Expedition from Perkins' Plantation to Hard Times Landing April 25–29. Phelps' and Clark's Bayous April 26. Choctaw Bayou, or Lake Bruin, April 28. Battle of Port Gibson May 1. Battle of Champion Hill May 16. Big Black River May 17. Siege of Vicksburg, Miss., May 18-July 4. Assaults on Vicksburg May 19 and 22. Duty at Warrenton May 25 to July 14, and at Vicksburg until August 13. Ordered to New Orleans, La., August 13, and duty there until September 8. At Brashear City until October 3. Western Louisiana Campaign October 3-November 18. Moved to DeCrow's Point, Matagorda Bay, Texas, November 18–28, and duty there until January 14, 1864. At Matagorda Island until April 18. Moved to Alexandria, La., April 18–26. Red River Campaign April 26-May 22. Graham's Plantation May 5. Retreat to Morganza May 13–20. Mansura, or Marksville Prairie, May 16. Expedition to Atchafalaya May 30-June 6. Duty at Morganza until November 21. Moved to mouth of White River, Ark., November 21–26. Return to Morganza December 6. Expedition to Morgan's Ferry, Atchafalaya River, December 13–14. Moved to Kenner, La., January 8, 1865; thence to Barrancas, Fla., January 24. Campaign against Mobile, Ala., and its Defenses, March 20-April 12. March from Pensacola, Fla., to Blakely, Ala., March 20-April 2. Occupation of Canoe Station March 27. Siege of Spanish Fort and Fort Blakely April 2–8. Assault and capture of Fort Blakely April 9. Occupation of Mobile April 12. March to Montgomery and Selma April 13–25. Duty at Selma until May 12, and at Mobile until June 13. Moved to Galveston, Texas, June 13, and duty there until July. Veterans and recruits transferred to 48th Ohio Veteran Battalion July 24.

== Casualties ==
The regiment lost a total of 311 men during service; 3 officers and 36 enlisted men killed or mortally wounded, 2 officers and 270 enlisted men died of disease.

== Commanders ==
- Colonel John Cradlebaugh
- Lieutenant Colonel John Henry Kelly - commanded at the siege of Vicksburg

== See also ==
- List of Ohio Civil War units
- Ohio in the Civil War
