= John Cradlebaugh =

American politician

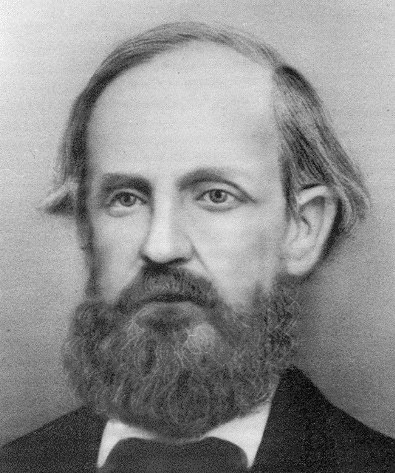

Delegate to the U.S. House of Representatives from the Nevada Territory's at-large district
- In office December 2, 1861 – March 3, 1863
- Preceded by: Constituency established
- Succeeded by: Gordon Newell Mott

Personal details
- Born: February 22, 1819 Circleville, Ohio, U.S.
- Died: February 22, 1872 (aged 53) Eureka, Nevada, U.S.
- Party: Independent
- Education: Kenyon College; Miami University, Oxford

John Cradlebaugh (February 22, 1819 – February 22, 1872) was the first delegate to the United States House of Representatives from Nevada Territory.

== Biography ==
Born in Circleville, Ohio, he attended the common schools; Kenyon College (in Gambier, Ohio) and Miami University (in Ohio). He studied law, was admitted to the bar in 1840, and was appointed United States associate justice for the district of Utah on June 4, 1858.

In March 1859, Cradlebaugh convened a grand jury in Provo, Utah concerning the Mountain Meadows Massacre and several other unsolved murders and crimes that occurred in the territory, but the jury declined to return any indictments or deliver a report on the charges. Cradlebaugh dismissed the jury and, acting as committing magistrate and accompanied by a military escort, continued his investigation in the vicinity of Mountain Meadows. Territorial officials such as Governor Alfred Cumming objected to Cradlebaugh's use of federal troops and petitioned for the troops removal. United States Attorney General Jeremiah S. Black subsequently barred Cradlebaugh and fellow judge Charles Sinclair from requisitioning troops in Utah.

Cradlebaugh moved to Carson City, Nevada, and upon the formation of the Territory of Nevada was elected a Delegate to the Thirty-seventh Congress, serving from December 2, 1861, to March 3, 1863, during the first years of the American Civil War.

He was the colonel of the 114th Ohio Infantry and served from April 27, 1862, until honorably discharged on October 20, 1863, on tender of resignation after being wounded in the Battle of Vicksburg.

Cradlebaugh returned to Nevada and engaged in the mining business until his death at Eureka; interment was in Forest Cemetery, Circleville, Ohio.

U.S. House of Representatives
New constituency	Delegate to the U.S. House of Representatives from the Nevada Territory's at-large congressional district 1861–1863	Succeeded by Gordon Newell Mott
