= Nevada Territory's at-large congressional district =

Obsolete U.S. House territory district

Coordinates: 39°N 117°W

- Obsolete district
- Created: 1861, as a non-voting delegate was granted by Congress
- Eliminated: 1864, as a result of statehood
- Years active: 1861–1864

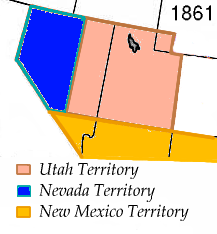
Nevada Territory in 1861, with the Utah and New Mexico territories.

Nevada Territory's at-large congressional district is an obsolete congressional district that encompassed the area of the Nevada Territory, which was split off from the Utah Territory in 1861. After Nevada's admission to the Union as the 36th state by act of Congress on October 31, 1864, this district was dissolved and replaced by Nevada's at-large congressional district.

== List of delegates representing the district ==
On March 2, 1861, an act of Congress gave Nevada Territory the authority to elect a Congressional delegate.

Delegate	Party	Years	Cong ress	Electoral history
John Cradlebaugh (Carson City)	Independent	December 2, 1861 – March 3, 1863	37th	Elected in 1861. [data missing]
Gordon Newell Mott (Carson City)	Republican	March 4, 1863 – October 31, 1864	38th	Elected in 1862. Retired when statehood achieved.
