= Gordon Newell Mott =

American judge and politician (1812–1887)

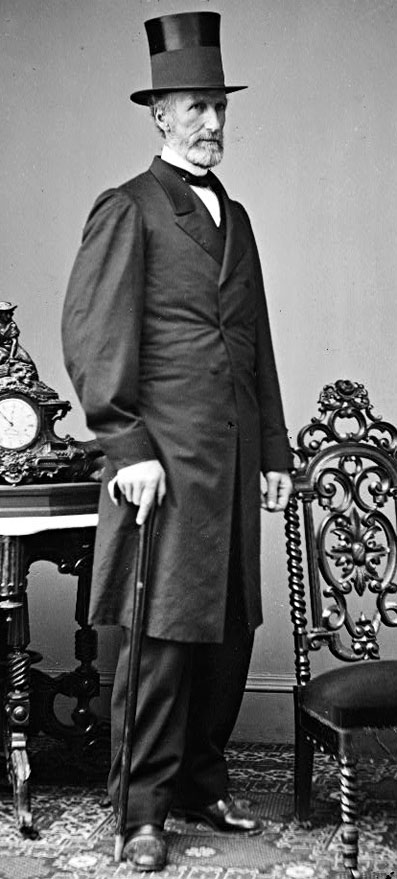

Delegate to the U.S. House of Representatives from the Nevada Territory's at-large district
- In office March 4, 1863 – October 31, 1864
- Preceded by: John Cradlebaugh
- Succeeded by: Henry G. Worthington (Representative)

Associate Justice of the Territorial Supreme Court of Nevada
- In office 1861–1863
- Preceded by: New seat

Personal details
- Born: Gordon Newell Mott; October 21, 1812 Zanesville, Ohio, U.S.
- Died: April 27, 1887 (aged 74) San Francisco, California, U.S.
- Party: Republican
- Profession: Lawyer, Judge, Politician

Gordon Newell Mott (October 21, 1812 – April 27, 1887) was the second and final delegate to the United States House of Representatives from Nevada Territory, serving from March 1863 until statehood.

== Biography ==
Born in Zanesville, Ohio, Mott completed preparatory studies and studied law. He was admitted to the bar and commenced practice in Zanesville in 1836. He moved to Texas during its struggle for independence and served nine months as a volunteer. He then returned to Ohio and resumed the practice of law. He later moved to California, in 1849, and served as judge of Sutter County in 1850 and district judge from 1851 to 1854. He moved to Nevada in 1861. He was appointed by President Abraham Lincoln associate justice of the supreme court of Nevada Territory on March 27, 1861, and served until his resignation in 1863, having been elected to Congress.

Mott was elected as a Republican to the Thirty-eighth Congress and served from March 4, 1863, to October 31, 1864, when the Nevada Territory became a state. He was not a candidate for elective office from the new state. According to one account, Mott "should have traveled to Washington, but instead he journeyed to Ohio, allegedly because of his health", and therefore "never took his seat in Congress".

Mott died in San Francisco, California on April 27, 1887, and was interred in Laurel Hill Cemetery.

U.S. House of Representatives
Preceded by John Cradlebaugh	Delegate to the U.S. House of Representatives from the Nevada Territory's at-large congressional district 1863–1864	Succeeded by Henry G. Worthington as U.S. Representative
