= Henry G. Worthington =

American politician

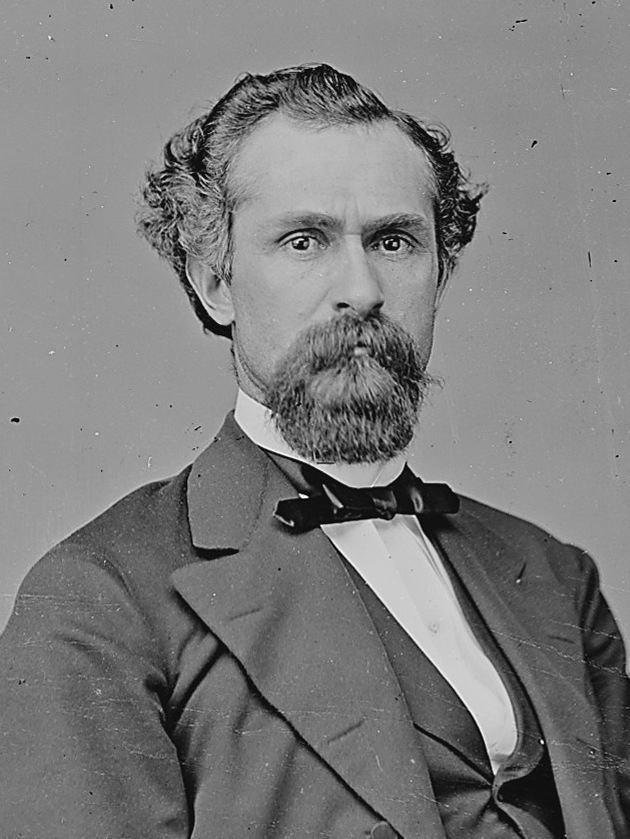
- Worthington in 1864

Member of the U.S. House of Representatives from Nevada's at-large district
- In office October 31, 1864 – March 3, 1865
- Preceded by: Gordon Newell Mott (as territorial delegate)
- Succeeded by: Delos R. Ashley

Member of the California State Assembly
- In office 1861-1862

8th United States Minister to Argentina
- In office September 11, 1868 – July 8, 1869
- Preceded by: Alexander Asboth
- Succeeded by: Robert C. Kirk

Personal details
- Born: February 9, 1828 Cumberland, Maryland
- Died: July 29, 1909 (aged 81) Washington, D.C.
- Party: Republican

Henry Gaither Worthington (February 9, 1828 – July 29, 1909) was an American lawyer, politician and diplomat. He was notable for serving as the first United States Representative from Nevada. He served near the end of the American Civil War after passage of the Lincoln Administration's legislation to grant statehood to the Territory of Nevada, which was part of a strategy to increase Republican and pro-Union support in Congress during the war.

== Biography ==
Worthington was born in Cumberland, Maryland, on February 9, 1828. He was educated in Maryland, studied law, was admitted to the bar, and moved to Tuolumne County, California, to start a practice. He later traveled in Central America and Mexico as part of the William Walker expedition, and upon returning to the United States he settled in San Francisco.

In 1860 Worthington was appointed a colonel of cavalry in the California Militia. He later attained the rank of major general and was usually referred to as "general" for the rest of his life. He served in the California State Assembly from 1861 to 1862, and then served as Clerk of the Assembly. He moved to Austin, Nevada, in 1863, where he continued to practice law.

When Nevada was admitted to the Union Worthington was an unsuccessful candidate for Attorney General. He was then elected to a partial term in the U.S. House as a Republican. He served in the 38th Congress, October 31, 1864 to March 3, 1865. Worthington's vote was crucial in securing the two-thirds majority needed to pass the 13th Amendment abolishing slavery, and he also authored the bill to establish Nevada's federal courts.

Worthington was an unsuccessful candidate for reelection to a full term. After his term expired, he remained in Washington D.C., and was a witness to the assassination of Abraham Lincoln. Worthington was one of the official pallbearers at Lincoln's funeral.

In 1867 he moved to Omaha, Nebraska, where he narrowly lost a campaign for the United States Senate. He was nominated to serve as Nebraska's U.S. District Court judge, but the nomination was later withdrawn as part of resolving a feud between competing candidates.

Worthington served as U.S. Ambassador to Argentina June 1868 to July 1869 and concurrently as Ambassador to Uruguay beginning in October 1868.

In 1872 he was accused of aiding John J. Patterson to win a U.S. Senate seat from South Carolina by means of bribery, but Patterson was acquitted. During the Ulysses S. Grant administration he was appointed Collector of the Port of Charleston, South Carolina, serving from 1872 to 1877.

Worthington later returned to Washington, D.C., where he practiced law and was active in several business ventures. In December 1908 he suffered a stroke while he was a visitor on the floor of the U.S. House. He was almost completely paralyzed, and remained in the hospital until his death on July 29, 1909.

He was buried at Congressional Cemetery. His grave remained unmarked until 2000 when a Nevada newspaper editor worked with members of the state's Congressional delegation to obtain and place a headstone. The ceremony in April, 2000 was attended by current and former members of Nevada's Congressional delegation and Uruguay's chargé d'affaires.

== Electoral history ==
- 1864 Nevada At-Large Congressional District General Election (November 8, 1864):

- H.G. Worthington (R), 59.9% - 9,776 votes
- A.C. Bradford (D), 40.1% - 6,552 votes

== Notes ==
U.S. House of Representatives
Preceded by Gordon Newell Mott (territorial delegate)	Member of the U.S. House of Representatives from Nevada's at-large congressional district October 31, 1864 – March 3, 1865	Succeeded by Delos R. Ashley
