= Samuel Knox =

American politician (1815–1905)

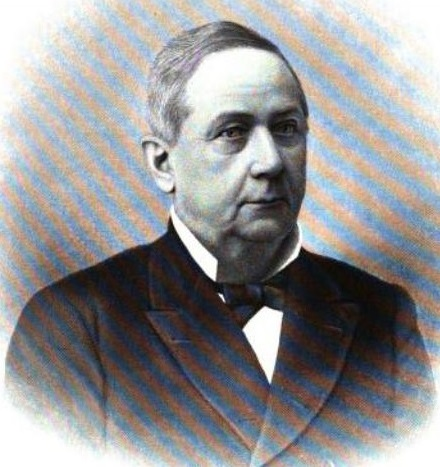

Member of the U.S. House of Representatives from Missouri's 1st district
- In office June 10, 1864 – March 3, 1865
- Preceded by: Francis Preston Blair Jr.
- Succeeded by: John Hogan

Personal details
- Born: March 21, 1815 Blandford, Massachusetts, U.S.
- Died: March 7, 1905 (aged 89) Blandford, Massachusetts, U.S.
- Resting place: Peabody Cemetery, Springfield, Massachusetts
- Party: People's Emancipation
- Spouse: Mary Kerr
- Children: 3
- Parent(s): Alanson Knox; Lucinda Knox
- Education: Harvard Law School
- Profession: Politician, lawyer

Samuel Knox (March 21, 1815 – March 7, 1905) was an American politician and abolitionist who represented Missouri in the United States House of Representatives during the American Civil War.

Born in Blandford, Massachusetts, Knox attended the common schools. He graduated from Williams College in 1836 and subsequently studied law at Harvard University. Upon receiving his degree in 1838, he moved to St. Louis, Missouri and was admitted to the bar. In the early 1850s, Knox helped to provide the land for the Alpine Presbyterian Church in Menlo, Georgia after participating in the approval for a committee to organize the church.

Knox was a candidate for the U.S. House of Representatives from Missouri's 1st congressional district in 1862 against incumbent Republican Francis P. Blair Jr. The campaign revolved around competing proposals for the abolition of slavery in Missouri, with Blair endorsing a plan for gradual compensated emancipation backed by Governor Hamilton Rowan Gamble, leader of the state's conservative Unionists. This conformed to the moderate position occupied by President Abraham Lincoln in the summer of 1862, but disappointed radical Unionists, including many of Blair's German-American supporters, who favored immediate emancipation. This group nominated Knox to run on the People's Emancipation ticket. The election was chaotic and closely contested, with success hinging on the votes of active service Union soldiers. Blair led early in the count and was seated at the start of the 38th Congress, but his plurality was reversed by late returns favoring Knox; the latter successfully challenged the certified result and replaced Blair on June 10, 1864, serving until the expiration of his term on March 4, 1865.

Knox was not reelected to the 39th Congress and retired to his law practice. He returned to Blandford, where he died on March 7, 1905, and was interred in Peabody Cemetery, in Springfield, Massachusetts.

U.S. House of Representatives
Preceded by Francis Preston Blair Jr.	Member of the U.S. House of Representatives from Missouri's 1st congressional district 1864–1865	Succeeded by John Hogan
