= Francis Preston Blair Jr. =

American general and politician (1821–1875)

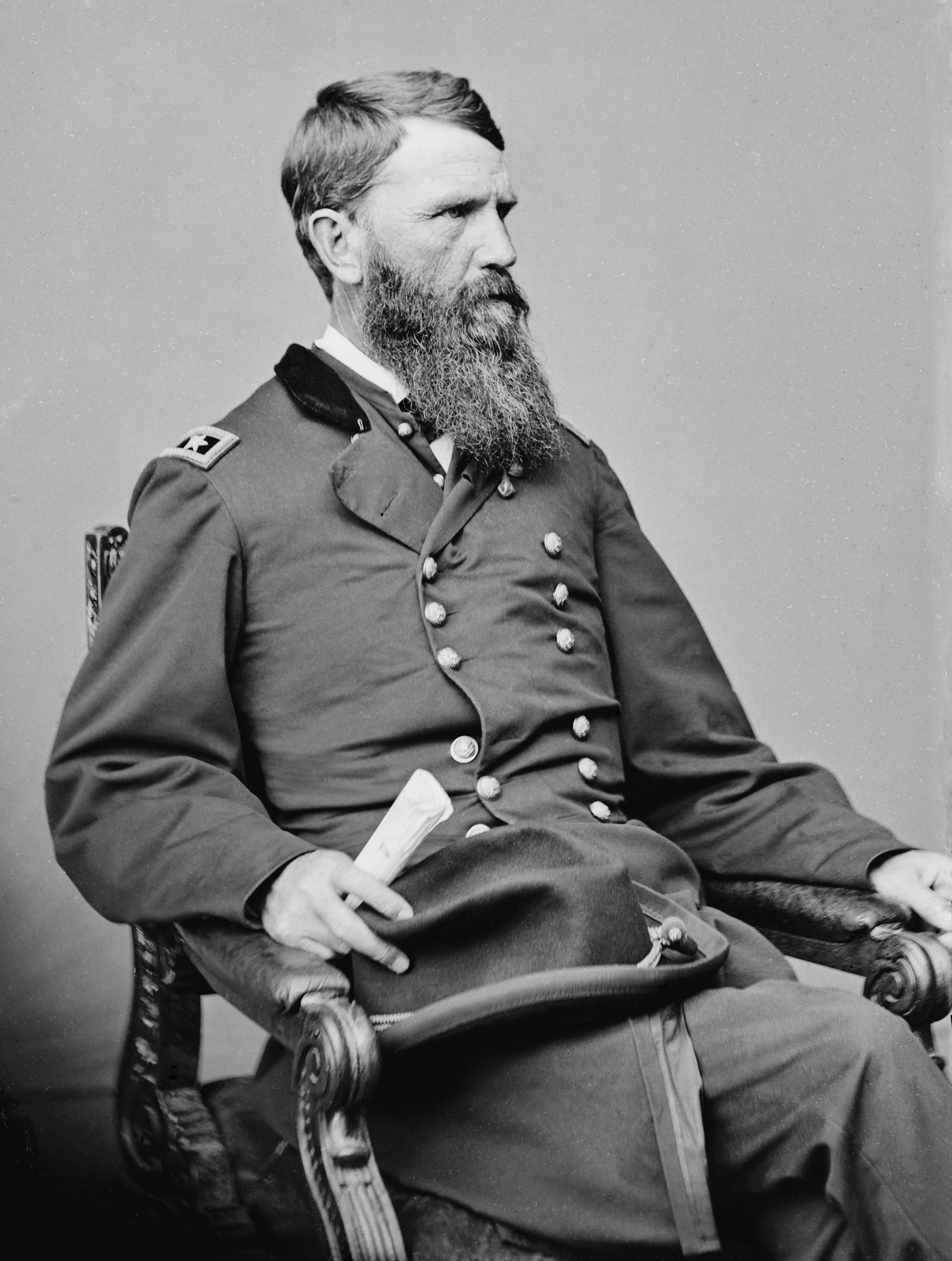
- Blair in 1862

United States Senator from Missouri
- In office January 20, 1871 – March 3, 1873
- Preceded by: Daniel T. Jewett
- Succeeded by: Lewis V. Bogy

Member of the U.S. House of Representatives from Missouri's 1st district
- In office March 4, 1861 – June 10, 1864
- Preceded by: John R. Barret
- Succeeded by: Samuel Knox
- In office June 8, 1860 – June 25, 1860
- Preceded by: John R. Barret
- Succeeded by: John R. Barret
- In office March 4, 1857 – March 3, 1859
- Preceded by: Luther M. Kennett
- Succeeded by: John R. Barret

Personal details
- Born: February 19, 1821 Lexington, Kentucky, U.S.
- Died: July 8, 1875 (aged 54) St. Louis, Missouri, U.S.
- Resting place: Bellefontaine Cemetery
- Party: Democratic (before 1848, 1866–75); Free Soil (1848–54); Republican (1854–61); Union (Note: During the 1860s, border state unionists were divided between Conservative and Radical factions. Blair became aligned with Missouri's Conservative unionists, who sometimes called themselves the Unconditional Union Party. This should not be confused with the Unconditional Union Party, a Radical political party active in several other border states, and known in Missouri as the Radical Union Party.) (1861–66)
- Other political affiliations: Opposition (1857–1860)
- Spouse: Appoline Alexander (m. 1847)
- Children: 8
- Parent: Francis Preston Blair (father)
- Relatives: Montgomery Blair (brother); Benjamin Gratz Brown (cousin)
- Education: Yale University; University of North Carolina, Chapel Hill; Princeton University (BA); Transylvania University

Military service
- Allegiance: United States
- Branch/service: U.S. Army (Union Army)
- Years of service: 1861–1865
- Rank: Major general
- Commands: 1st Brigade, 4th Division, XV Corps; 2nd Division, XV Corps; XV Corps; XVII Corps
- Battles/wars: Mexican- American War; American Civil War

Francis Preston Blair Jr. (February 19, 1821 – July 8, 1875) was a United States senator, a United States representative, and a Union Army major general during the American Civil War. He represented Missouri in both the House of Representatives and the Senate, and was active in preventing the state of Missouri from being absorbed into the Confederacy at the beginning of the war.

Blair was instrumental in appointing Nathaniel Lyon as the new military commander of the Western Department of the U.S. Army. He assisted Lyon in securing help of the St. Louis Home Guard in moving over 20,000 rifles and muskets from the St. Louis Arsenal to Illinois. Missouri secessionists considered this event as breaking of informal truce established in the state. This set the scene for the Camp Jackson Affair and continuing guerrilla activity by outraged pro-slavery elements. In 1862, Blair joined the Missouri volunteers, being promoted major general, commanded a division at Vicksburg under Sherman, took part in Sherman's March to the Sea and ended the war as a corps commander.

In 1868, he was Horatio Seymour's vice-presidential candidate, but his dramatic speeches about the dangers of black emancipation were believed by some to have cost the Democrats the election. Blair suffered a paralyzing stroke in 1872, but continued to be active in state politics until his death three years later.

== Early life and career ==
Blair was born in Lexington, Kentucky. He was the third and youngest son of newspaper editor and politician Francis Preston Blair, and Eliza Violet (née Gist) Blair. He was the brother of Montgomery Blair, a Mayor of St. Louis and Postmaster General under Lincoln, and the cousin of B. Gratz Brown, a U.S. Senator and Governor of Missouri. Blair attended schools in Washington, D.C., was matriculated in Yale and the University of North Carolina, but graduated from Princeton University in 1841, and then studied law at Transylvania University. After his admission to the Kentucky bar in Lexington, he went on to practice in St. Louis in 1842 with his elder brother; in 1842–1845, he worked in the law office of Thomas Hart Benton.

== Mexican–American War ==
In fall 1845, Blair traveled to the West for buffalo hunt and stayed for a winter in eastern Colorado with his cousin George Bent in Bent's Fort, a settlement on the Santa Fe Trail. Blair played the banjo at some of the parties at the fort. After the Mexican–American War started he joined the expedition of General Stephen W. Kearny in Santa Fe, who then appointed Blair as an attorney general for the New Mexico Territory after it was secured. In collaboration with Alexander William Doniphan, Willard Preble Hall, and David Waldo, Blair developed an American Code of Law for the region and became a judge of the newly established circuit court.

== In the political arena ==
Being more interested in politics than law, Blair came back to St. Louis in the summer of 1847. A personal and political friend of Thomas Hart Benton, he became known for his views opposing slavery and strong advocacy of free soil politics, though he was a slaveholder himself. Blair served in the Missouri House of Representatives from 1852 to 1856, when he was elected to Congress. Missouri and the nation were in the midst of a sweeping political realignment which left Blair's partisan identity uncertain. According to the March 24, 1857 issue of The Western Democrat, a newspaper from Charlotte, North Carolina, Blair was elected as a Democrat and was "generally classed with the Opposition" due to his views on slavery. Other sources from this period refer to Blair as a "Free Democrat" and an "anti-Administration Democratic candidate ... of the Douglas and Wise stamp." The Biographical Directory of the United States Congress states he was seated as a Republican in the United States House of Representatives. Blair was an outspoken supporter of the Wilmot Proviso and opposed the proslavery Lecompton Constitution for the Kansas Territory. On January 14, 1858, he delivered a major speech describing slavery as a national problem, proposing to solve it by both gradual emancipation and the settling of freed slaves in Latin and Central America. A year later in Boston, he gained national prominence with his speech, The Destiny of the Races of This Continent.

Blair was defeated for re-election in 1858 by John R. Barret. Blair successfully contested the results and was seated in the 36th Congress on June 8, 1860. However, he resigned just seventeen days later on June 25, causing a special election against Barrey on October 3. Barret won and was seated on December 3. In the regular election of 1860, Blair won, entering the 37th Congress on March 4, 1861. He served as chairman of the important Military Affairs Committee. He again resigned in July 1861 in order to become a colonel in the Union Army. In 1862, he won election to the 38th Congress but in a reversal of fortune was himself forced to relinquish his seat on June 10, 1864, after his opponent, Samuel Knox, successfully contested the results.

The Blairs were unwavering supporters of Abraham Lincoln during his rise to the presidency and years in office and in return enjoyed his political patronage. In December 1863, Lincoln said, "The Blairs have to an unusual degree the spirit of clan. Their family is a close corporation. Frank is their hope and pride. They have a way of going with a rush for anything they undertake, especially have Montgomery and the Old Gentleman."

After Lincoln's election as President, several Southern states declared secession. Blair was a leader of the Unionists in Missouri. He helped organize the "Home Guard", an unofficial Unionist militia, which thwarted a secessionist conspiracy.

In time, Blair became alienated from Radical Unionists like B. Gratz Brown, who favored the immediate emancipation of all enslaved people in Missouri. Instead he favored Lincoln's proposal for gradual emancipation. Brown emerged as the leader of the Radical Union Party in Missouri, while Blair's faction became known as the Conservative Party.

== Civil War ==
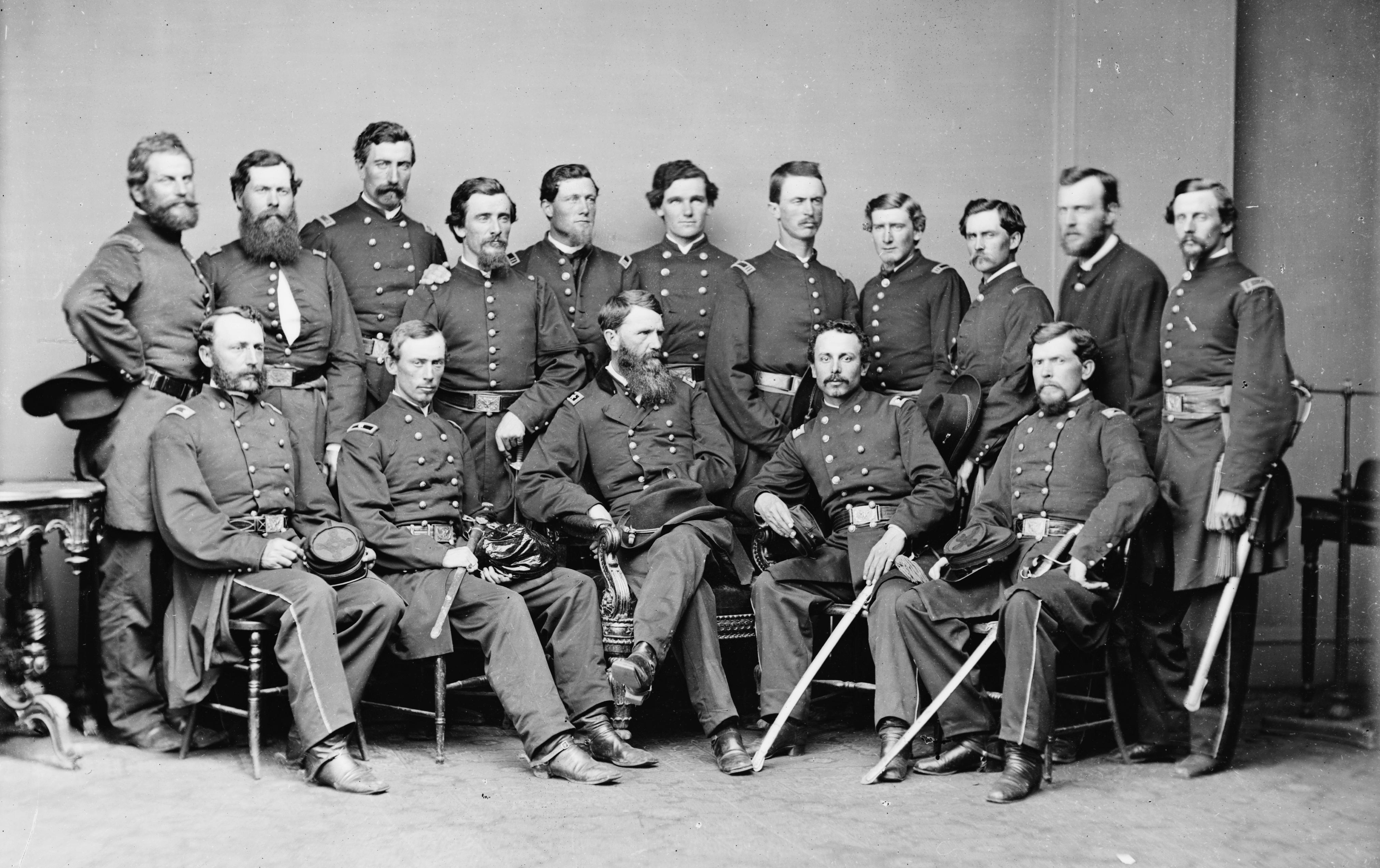
General Blair and his staff

Immediately after South Carolina's secession in December 1860, Blair, believing that the southern leaders were planning to carry Missouri into the movement, began active efforts to prevent it. He personally organized and equipped a force of several thousand strong Home Guard, drawn from the Wide Awakes, the Republican marching clubs of the 1860 presidential campaign, and the members of the German gymnastic movement in St. Louis, Turnverein. When tensions rose, Blair and Captain (later brigadier general) Nathaniel Lyon suddenly transferred the arms in the U.S. Arsenal at St. Louis to Alton, Illinois. On May 10, 1861, Lyon, with the Home Guards and a U.S. regular Army company, captured several hundred secessionist state militia which had been positioned to seize the Arsenal. The Camp Jackson Affair gave the Federal cause a decisive initial advantage in Missouri but also inflamed secessionist sentiments in the state.

Open warfare between Union forces and the followers of pro-Southern Missouri governor Claiborne Jackson was imminent. To avoid this, General William S. Harney, the Army commander in Missouri, agreed to the Price-Harney Truce with Missouri State Guard commander Sterling Price on May 21.

Blair objected, and contacted Republican leaders in Washington. Within a few weeks, Harney was replaced by Lyon as temporary commander. Lyon drove Jackson and Price to the southwestern corner of Missouri before he was killed at the Battle of Wilson's Creek, while Blair helped organize a new all-Unionist state government, and John C. Frémont took over as the U.S. Army Western Department commander.

Frémont was himself a prominent Republican with Missouri connections. Blair soon came to regard Frémont as a political rival, and they clashed over many aspects of Frémont's operations in Missouri. Frémont as the regional Army commander was responsible for spending a lot of money in a great hurry for supplies and equipment. Blair expected most of this money to go to his allies in the St. Louis business community, but Frémont and his staff had their own ideas. Blair's bitter complaints, added to the waste and corruption, helped discredit Frémont, who was replaced on November 2.

Blair was appointed a colonel of Missouri volunteers in July 1862. He was promoted brigadier general of volunteers in August 1862 and then to major general in November. After winning re-election to the House of Representatives, Blair resigned his commission, but he retracted it at a request/order from Lincoln dated in April 1864. In response to this, "the Senate passed a resolution that, thereafter, no officers whose resignations had been duly accepted should be restored to the service without a new appointment and confirmation by the Senate."

In Missouri, Blair commanded a brigade consisting of the 13th Illinois Infantry, the 29th, 30th, 31st, and 32nd Missouri Infantry, the 58th Ohio Infantry, 4th Company, Ohio Light Artillery, and Company C, 10th Missouri Cavalry.

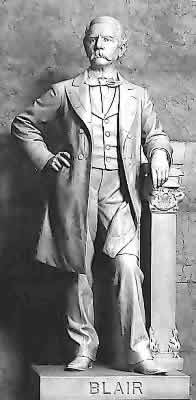
Francis Preston Blair Jr., National Statuary Hall Collection

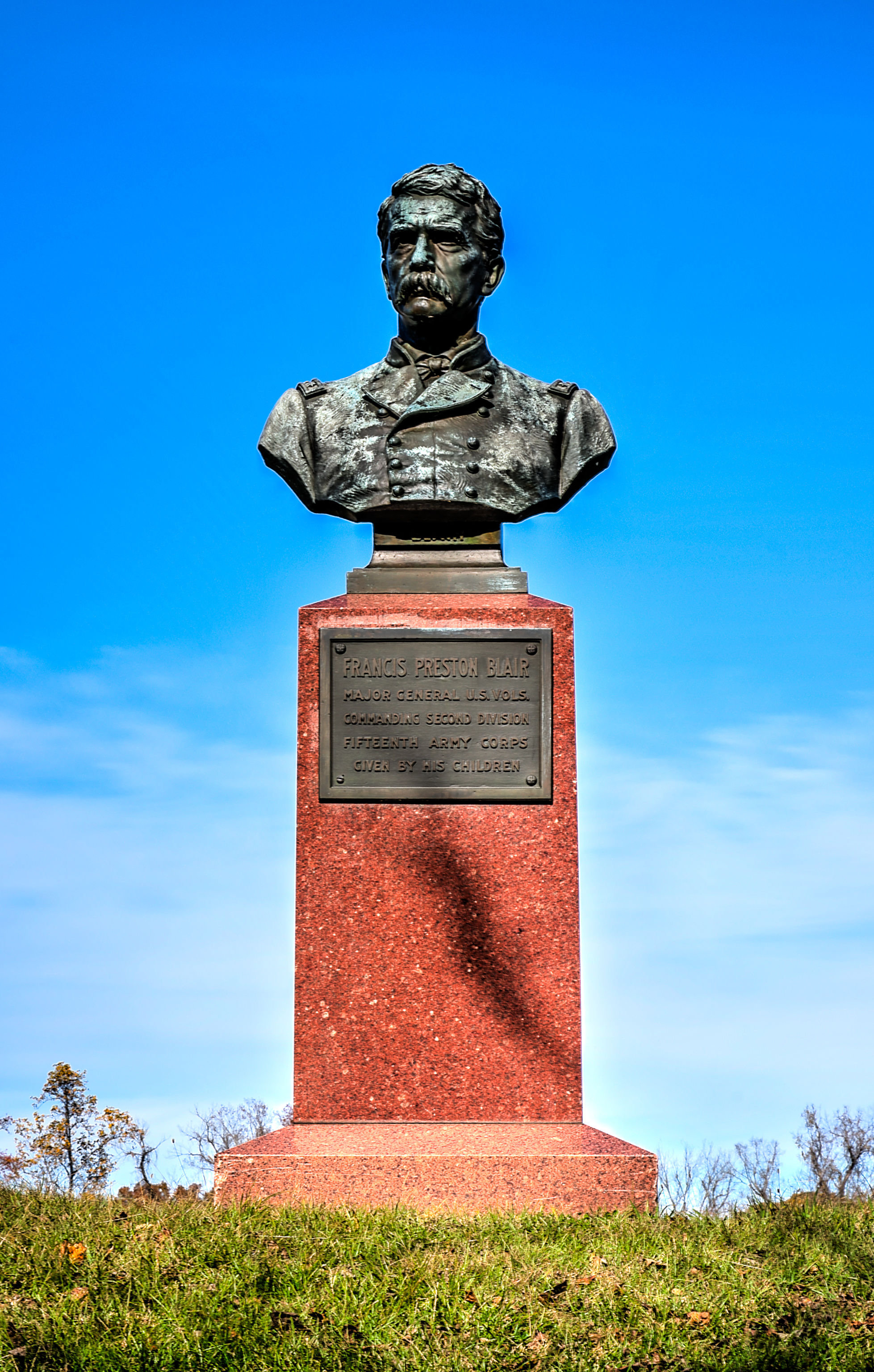
Bust of Blair by William Couper at Vicksburg National Military Park

Blair subsequently commanded a division in the Vicksburg campaign and in the fighting about Chattanooga, and was one of William T. Sherman's corps commanders in the final campaigns in Georgia and the Carolinas. His XVII Corps was engaged protecting the rear areas of Sherman's army until later in the Atlanta campaign. Before it left on the March to the Sea, XVII Corps absorbed part of the detachment of XVI Corps that had served with Sherman.

== Postbellum activities ==
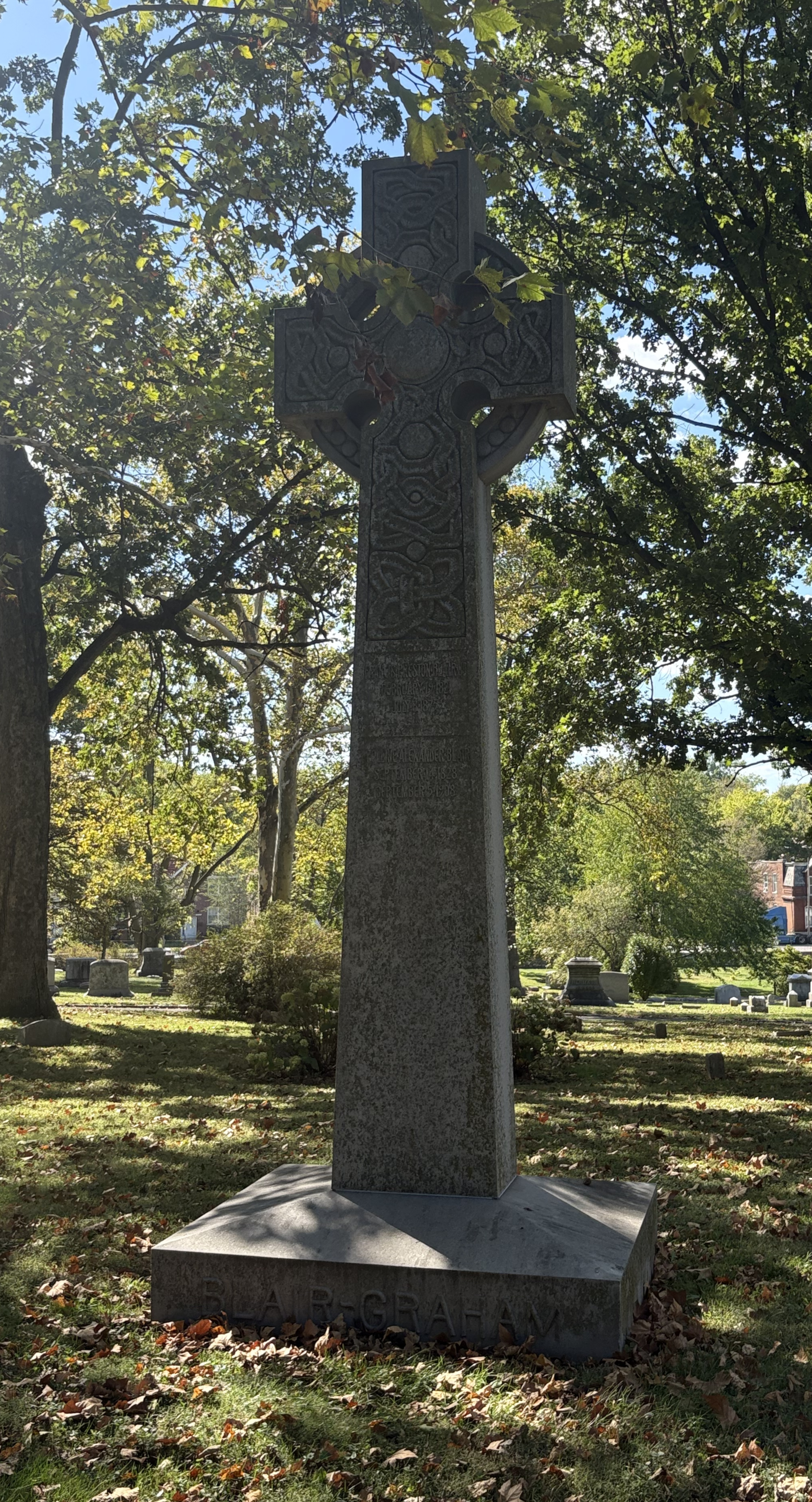
Graves of Francis and Appoline Blair at Bellefontaine Cemetery

At the close of the war, Blair, having spent much of his private fortune in support of the Union, was financially ruined. In 1866, like his father and brother he opposed the Congressional Reconstruction policy, and on that issue left the Republican Party.

In 1866 he ran for a seat on the Missouri General Assembly against Charles Branscomb. The election was contested, but in the end, Blair was defeated after the Missouri Attorney General Robert Franklin Wingate ruled that votes cast after sundown were valid.

In 1868, he was the unsuccessful Democratic candidate for vice president, running with Horatio Seymour. Blair contributed to the Democratic defeat by going on a speaking tour in which he framed the contest with Ulysses S. Grant and the pro-Reconstruction Republicans in stark racial terms, warning of the rule of "a semi-barbarous race of blacks who are worshipers of fetishes and poligamists" and wanted to "subject the white women to their unbridled lust." At least one Democratic Congressman saw Blair as the cause of Seymour's defeat, calling his behavior "stupid and indefensible."

Blair had an odd minor notoriety, when on July 29, 1870, he was an accidental witness to an incident in a famous homicide case. Staying at the then famous Fifth Avenue Hotel, facing West 23rd Street off Fifth Avenue, Blair woke up to cries of help from across the street. He watched from his hotel window as two men ran out of a brownstone mansion across the street. They were two of the sons of Benjamin Nathan, the Vice President of the New York Stock Exchange. Benjamin Nathan was found in the mansion, bludgeoned to death. There was a series of hearings, and even suspicion towards several people, but the mystery was never solved.

In 1871 Blair was chosen by the Missouri Legislature as a United States Senator. On November 16, 1872, he was stricken with paralysis, from which he never recovered. Largely owing to his stricken condition, he was defeated for reelection to the Senate in January 1873. Blair learned to write painfully with his left hand and continued his political efforts.

Blair's consuming interest in politics kept him active and he served as Missouri's state superintendent of insurance until his death from head injuries after a fall on July 8, 1875, at the age of 54. He is interred in Bellefontaine Cemetery.

== Family ==
In 1847, Blair married Appoline Alexander; they had eight children.

== Recognition ==
William T. Sherman after hearing about Blair's death said, "I always regarded him as one of the truest patriots, most honest and honorable men, and one of the most courageous soldiers this country ever produced." Ulysses S. Grant wrote about Frank Blair in his memoir that, "There was no man braver than he, nor was there any who obeyed all orders of his superior in rank with more unquestioning alacrity. He was one man as a soldier, another as a politician."

In 1885, a statue to Senator Blair was erected at the entrance to Forest Park in St. Louis at the intersection of Kingshighway and Lindell Blvds.

In 1899, the state of Missouri donated a marble statue of Blair by Alexander Doyle to the U.S. Capitol's National Statuary Hall Collection.

A street in the Throgs Neck section of the Bronx, New York is named in honor of Blair (Blair Avenue).

== See also ==
- List of American Civil War generals (Union)
- 1st Missouri, US Reserve Corps Infantry (3 months, 1861)

U.S. House of Representatives
| Preceded by Luther M. Kennett | Member of the U.S. House of Representatives from Missouri's 1st congressional district 1857–1859 | Succeeded by John R. Barret |
| Preceded by John R. Barret | Member of the U.S. House of Representatives from Missouri's 1st congressional district 1860 | Succeeded by John R. Barret |
| Preceded by John R. Barret | Member of the U.S. House of Representatives from Missouri's 1st congressional district 1861–1864 | Succeeded by Samuel Knox |
| Preceded by Benjamin Stanton | Chair of the House Armed Services Committee; 1861–1862 | Succeeded by James Buffington |
Party political offices
| Preceded by George H. Pendleton | Democratic nominee for Vice President of the United States; 1868 | Succeeded by Gratz Brown |
U.S. Senate
| Preceded by Daniel T. Jewett | U.S. Senator (Class 3) from Missouri; 1871–1873; Served alongside: Carl Schurz | Succeeded by Lewis V. Bogy |
