= 38th United States Congress =

1863-1865 U.S. Congress

←	37th	39th	→
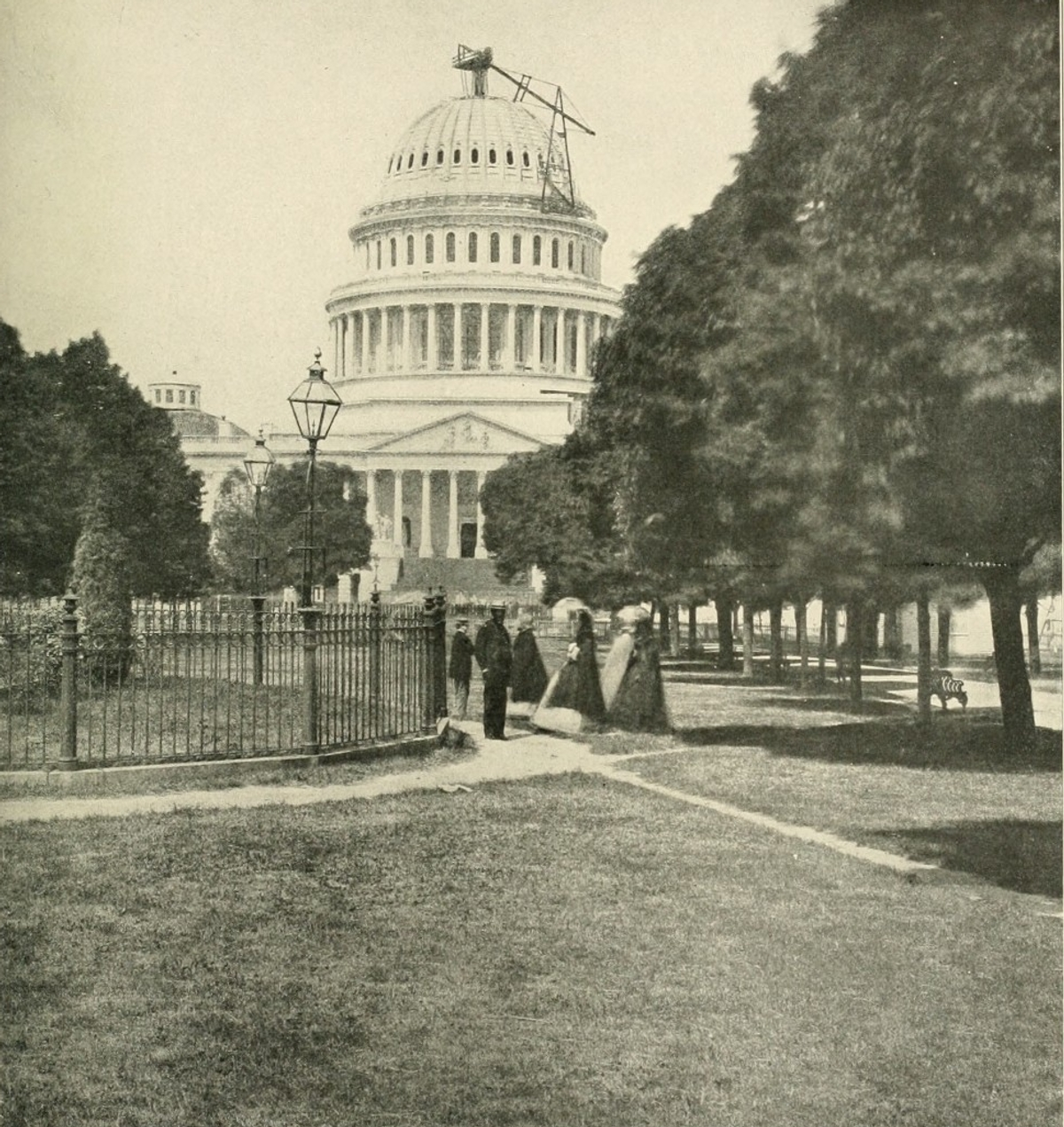
- United States Capitol (1863)

Overview
- Legislative body: United States Congress
- Jurisdiction: United States
- Term: March 4, 1863 – March 4, 1865

Senate
- Members: 52
- President: Hannibal Hamlin (RU)
- President pro tempore: Solomon Foot (RU); Daniel Clark (RU)
- Party control: Republican–Union

House of Representatives
- Members: 184 representatives 10 non-voting delegates
- Speaker: Schuyler Colfax (RU)
- Party control: Republican–Union

Sessions
- Special (Note: Special session of the Senate.): March 4, 1863 – March 14, 1863
- 1st: December 7, 1863 – July 4, 1864
- 2nd: December 5, 1864 – March 3, 1865

The 38th United States Congress was a meeting of the legislative branch of the United States federal government, consisting of the United States Senate and the United States House of Representatives. It met in Washington, D.C., from March 4, 1863, to March 4, 1865, during the last two years of President Abraham Lincoln's first term in office. The apportionment of seats in the House of Representatives was based on the 1860 United States census. The Republican–Union coalition controlled both the Senate and the House of Representatives.

== Major events ==
- American Civil War, which had started in 1861, continued through this Congress and ended later in 1865
- January 8, 1863: Ground broken in Sacramento, California, on the construction of the First transcontinental railroad in the United States
- November 19, 1863: Gettysburg Address
- November 8, 1864: President Abraham Lincoln is reelected, defeating George McClellan.

== Major legislation ==
- April 22, 1864: Coinage Act of 1864, Sess. 1, ch. 66, 13 Stat. 54
- June 25, 1864: Washington County Public Schools Act ("An Act to provide for the Public Instruction of Youth in the County of Washington, District of Columbia, and for other Purposes"), Sess. 1, ch. 156, 13 Stat. 187
- June 30, 1864: Yosemite Valley Grant Act, Sess. 1, 16 Stat. 48
- March 3, 1865: Freedmen's Bureau, Sess. 2, ch. 90, 13 Stat. 507

=== Major bills not enacted ===
- Wade–Davis Bill passed both houses July 2, 1864, but pocket vetoed

== Constitutional amendments ==
- January 31, 1865: Approved an amendment to the United States Constitution abolishing slavery in the United States and involuntary servitude, except as punishment for a crime, and submitted it to the state legislatures for ratification 13 Stat. 567
  - Amendment was later ratified on December 6, 1865, becoming the Thirteenth Amendment to the United States Constitution

== Treaties ratified ==
- February 9, 1865: Chippewa Indians, 13 Stat. 393

== States admitted and territories organized ==
=== States ===
- June 19, 1863: West Virginia admitted (formed from a portion of Virginia), 13 Stat. 731 (see also 12 Stat. 633)
- October 31, 1864: Nevada admitted, 13 Stat. 749 (see also 13 Stat. 30)

=== Territories ===
- May 26, 1864: Montana Territory organized, Sess. 1, ch. 95, 13 Stat. 85

== States in rebellion ==
The Confederacy fielded armies and sustained the rebellion into a second Congress, but the Union did not accept secession and secessionists were not eligible for Congress. Elections held in Missouri and Kentucky seated all members to the House and Senate for the 38th Congress. Elections held among Unionists in Virginia, Tennessee and Louisiana were marred by disruption resulting in turnouts that were so low compared with 1860, that Congress did not reseat the candidates with a majority of the votes cast.

- In rebellion 1862–64 according to the Emancipation Proclamation were Arkansas, Texas, Louisiana (parts), Mississippi, Alabama, Florida, Georgia, South Carolina, North Carolina and Virginia (parts). Tennessee was not held to be in rebellion as of the end of 1862.

== Party summary ==
The count below identifies party affiliations at the beginning of the first session of this Congress, and includes members from vacancies and newly admitted states, when they were first seated. Changes resulting from subsequent replacements are shown below in the "Changes in membership" section.

=== Senate ===
During this Congress, two seats were added for each of the new states of Nevada and West Virginia, thereby adding four new seats.

Thirty-six Republican–Unionists, nine Democrats, and five border state Unionists served in the Senate following the 1862–63 United States Senate elections. Changes in party membership and the admission of senators from new states during the 38th Congress found 39 Republican–Unionists and 12 Democrats at the end of the term.

	Party (shading shows control)			Total	Vacant
	Democratic (D)	Republican– Union (RU)	Unionist (U)	Total	Vacant
End of previous congress	8	31	10	49	19
Begin	9	36	5	50	20
End	12	39	0	51	21
Final voting share	23.5%	76.5%	0.0%		
Beginning of next congress	11	40	0	51	23

=== House of Representatives ===
Before this Congress, the 1860 United States census and resulting reapportionment changed the size of the House to 241 members. During this Congress, one seat was added for the new state of Nevada, and three seats were reapportioned from Virginia to the new state of West Virginia.

Ninety–eight Republican–Unionists, 74 Democrats, eight Union Democrats, one Conservative Unionist, one Unconditional Union Democrat, and one Independent Republican–Unionist were elected in 1862 and 1863. Two Union Democrats and the Unconditional Union Democrat joined the Republican–Union coalition at the start of Congress. The Conservative Unionist became a Democrat later during the term.

	Party (shading shows control)							Total	Vacant
	Conservative (C)	Democratic (D)	Republican– Union (RU)	Independent Republican (IR)	Union Democratic (UD)	Unconditional Union Democratic (UUD)	Other	Total	Vacant
End of previous congress	0	43	121 (Note: 108 Republicans, 12 Unionists, 1 People's)	0	10	0	6 (Note: 4 Constitutional Unionists, 1 Independent Democrat, 1 Union and Peace)	180	56
Begin	1	74	98	1	8	1	0	183	58
End	0	75	101	1	6	0	0	183	58
Final voting share	0.0%	41.0%	55.2%	0.5%	3.3%	0.0%	0.0%		
Beginning of next congress	9	35	147	1	0	0	0	192	50

== Leadership ==
=== Senate leadership ===
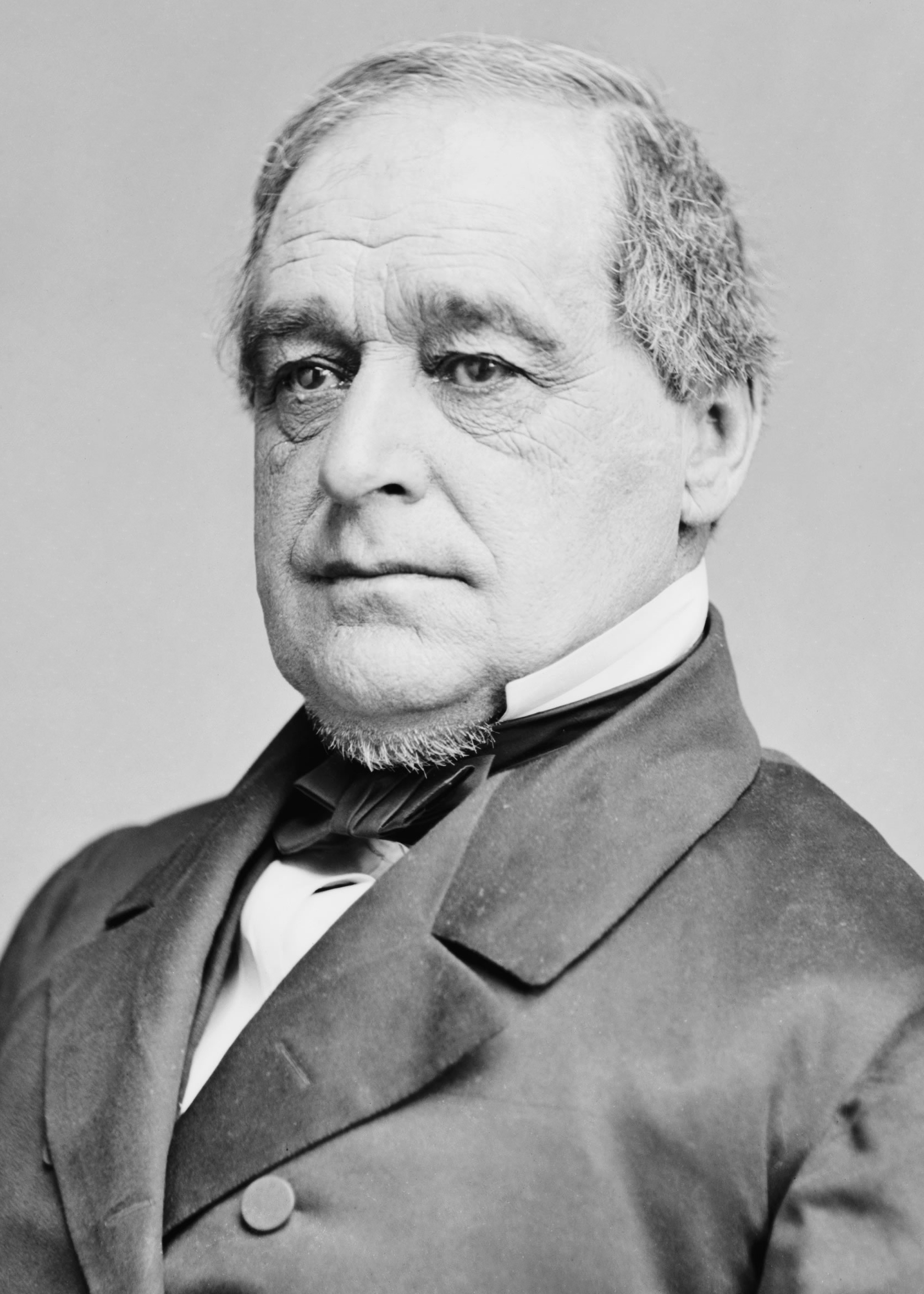
Senate President
Hannibal Hamlin (RU)

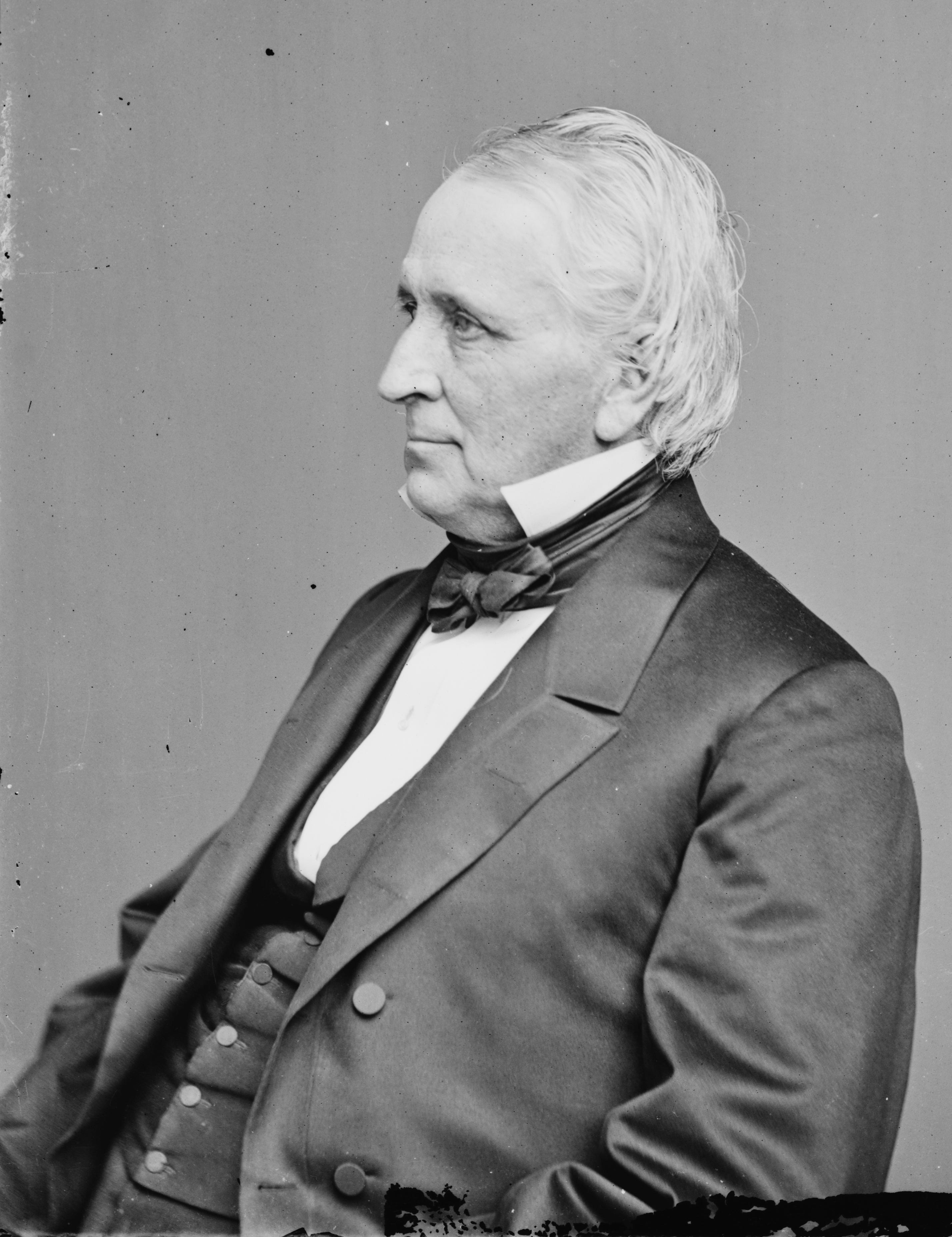
President pro tempore
Solomon Foot (RU),
until April 13, 1864

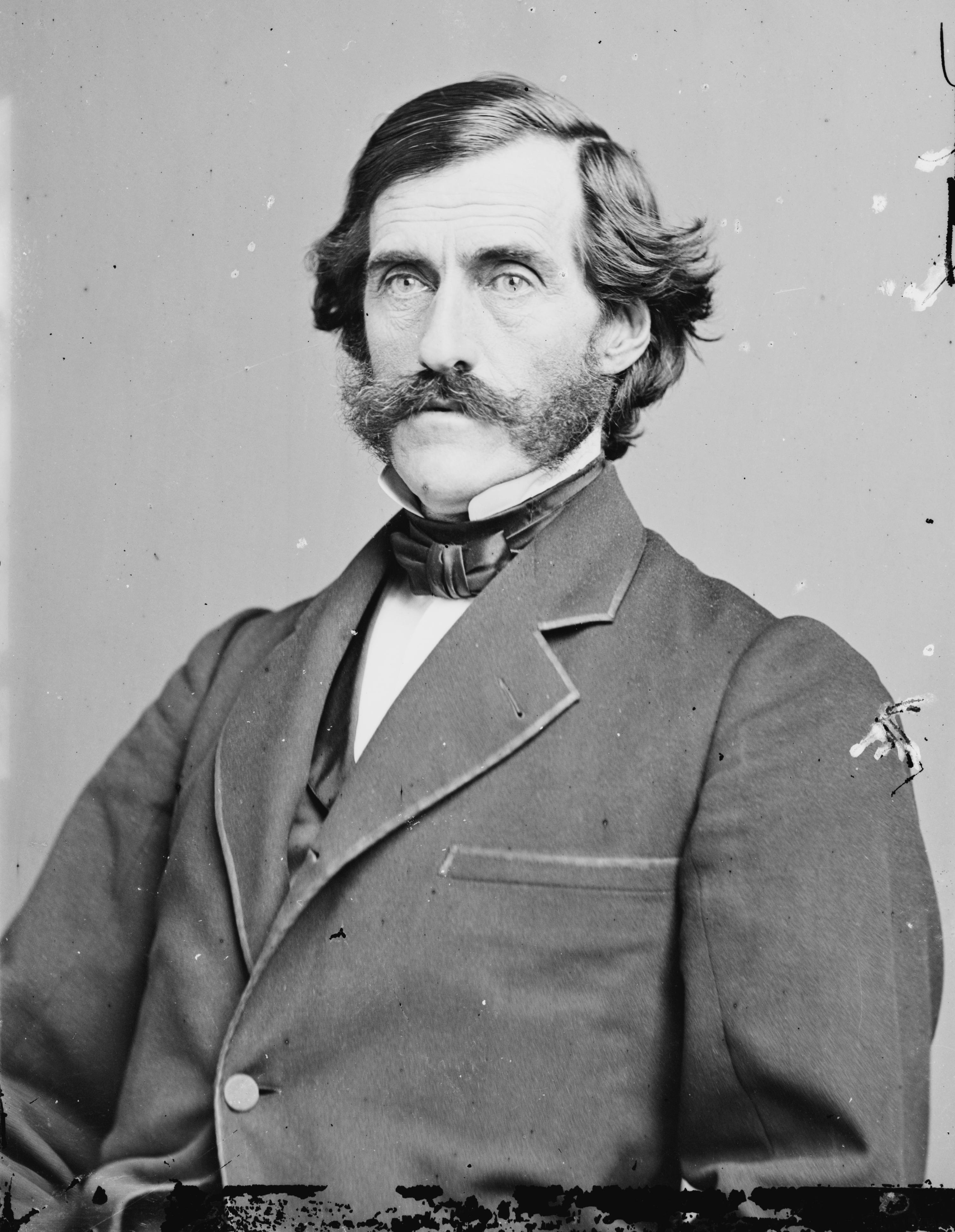
President pro tempore
Daniel Clark (RU),
after April 13, 1864

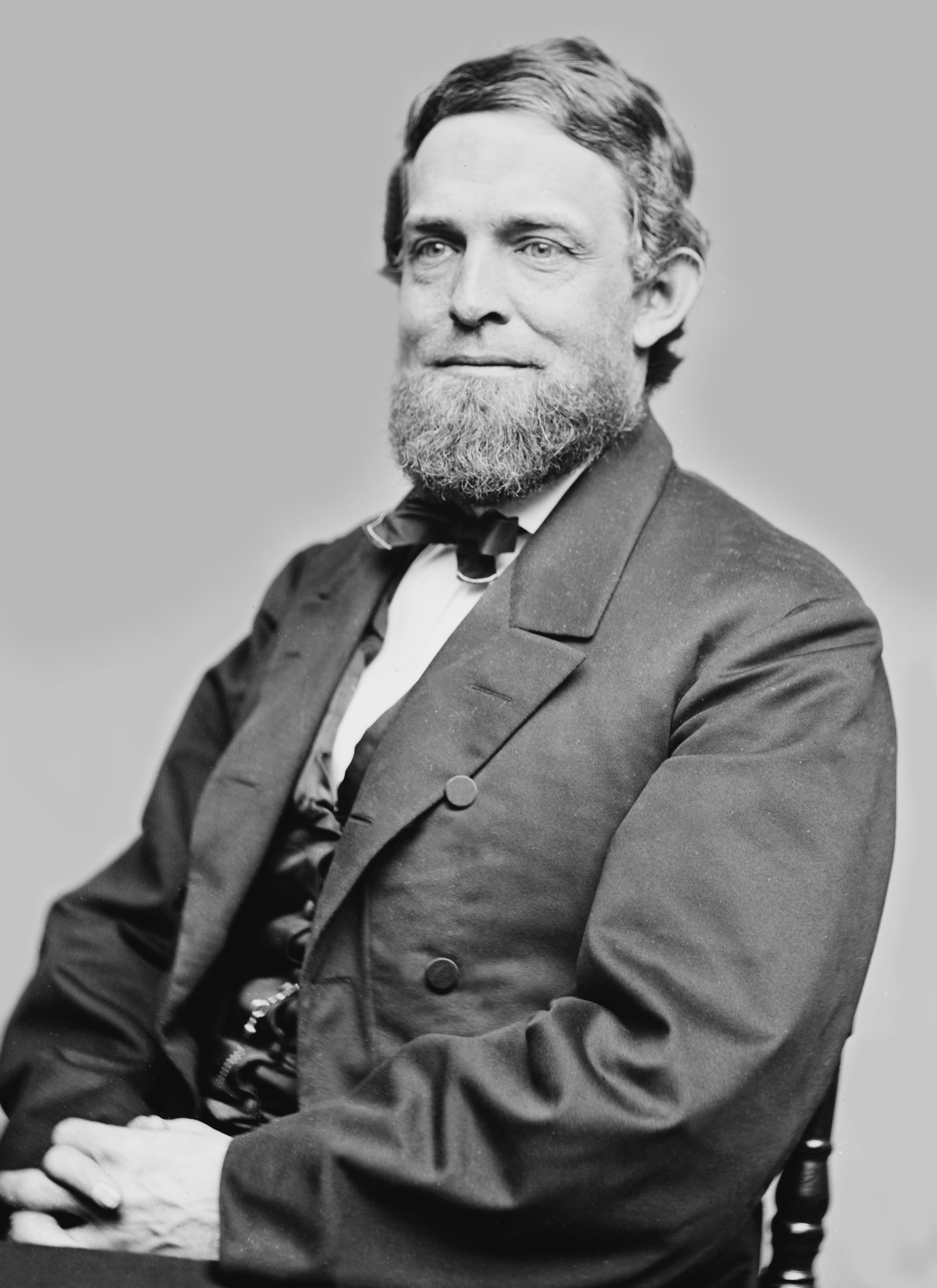
Speaker of the House
Schuyler Colfax (RU)

- President: Hannibal Hamlin (RU)
- President pro tempore: Solomon Foot (RU), until April 13, 1864
  - Daniel Clark (RU), elected April 26, 1864

==== Majority (Republican–Union) leadership ====
- Chair of the Senate Republican Conference: Henry B. Anthony

=== House of Representatives ===
- Speaker: Schuyler Colfax (RU)

==== Majority (Republican–Union) leadership ====
- Chair of the House Republican Conference: Justin S. Morrill
- Chairman, Committee on Ways and Means: Thaddeus Stevens (RU)

== Members ==
This list is arranged by chamber, then by state. Senators are listed by class, and representatives are listed by district.

Skip to House of Representatives, below

=== Senate ===
Senators were elected by the state legislatures every two years, with one-third beginning new six-year terms with each Congress. Preceding the names in the list below are Senate class numbers, which indicate the cycle of their election. In this Congress, Class 1 meant their term began in this Congress, requiring reelection in 1868; Class 2 meant their term ended in this Congress, requiring reelection in 1864; and Class 3 meant their term began in the last Congress, requiring reelection in 1866.

==== Alabama ====
2. Vacant
3. Vacant

==== Arkansas ====
2. Vacant
3. Vacant

==== California ====
▌1. John Conness (RU)
▌3. James A. McDougall (D)

==== Connecticut ====
▌1. James Dixon (RU)
▌3. Lafayette S. Foster (RU)

==== Delaware ====
▌1. James A. Bayard Jr. (D), until January 29, 1864

▌George Read Riddle (D), from February 2, 1864

▌2. Willard Saulsbury Sr. (D)

==== Florida ====
1. Vacant
3. Vacant

==== Georgia ====
2. Vacant
3. Vacant

==== Illinois ====
▌2. William A. Richardson (D)
▌3. Lyman Trumbull (RU)

==== Indiana ====
▌1. Thomas A. Hendricks (D)
▌3. Henry S. Lane (RU)

==== Iowa ====
▌2. James W. Grimes (RU)
▌3. James Harlan (RU)

==== Kansas ====
▌2. Jim Lane (RU)
▌3. Samuel C. Pomeroy (RU)

==== Kentucky ====
▌2. Lazarus W. Powell (D)
▌▌3. Garrett Davis (U (Note: Switched to Democratic during the Congress.))

==== Louisiana ====
2. Vacant
3. Vacant

==== Maine ====
▌1. Lot M. Morrill (RU)
▌2. William P. Fessenden (RU), until July 1, 1864

▌Nathan A. Farwell (RU), from October 27, 1864

==== Maryland ====
▌▌1. Reverdy Johnson (U)
▌▌3. Thomas H. Hicks (U (Note: Switched to Republican–Union during the Congress.)), until February 14, 1865

==== Massachusetts ====
▌1. Charles Sumner (RU)
▌2. Henry Wilson (RU)

==== Michigan ====
▌1. Zachariah Chandler (RU)
▌2. Jacob M. Howard (RU)

==== Minnesota ====
▌1. Alexander Ramsey (RU)
▌2. Morton S. Wilkinson (RU)

==== Mississippi ====
1. Vacant
2. Vacant

==== Missouri ====
▌1. John B. Henderson (RU)
▌3. Robert Wilson (RU), until November 13, 1863

▌B. Gratz Brown (RU), from November 13, 1863

==== Nevada ====
▌1. William M. Stewart (RU), from February 1, 1865 (newly admitted state)
▌3. James W. Nye (RU), from February 1, 1865 (newly admitted state)

==== New Hampshire ====
▌2. John P. Hale (RU)
▌3. Daniel Clark (RU)

==== New Jersey ====
▌1. William Wright (D)
▌2. John C. Ten Eyck (RU)

==== New York ====
▌1. Edwin D. Morgan (RU)
▌3. Ira Harris (RU)

==== North Carolina ====
2. Vacant
3. Vacant

==== Ohio ====
▌1. Benjamin Wade (RU)
▌3. John Sherman (RU)

==== Oregon ====
▌2. Benjamin F. Harding (D)
▌3. James W. Nesmith (D)

==== Pennsylvania ====
▌1. Charles R. Buckalew (D)
▌3. Edgar Cowan (RU)

==== Rhode Island ====
▌1. William Sprague IV (RU)
▌2. Henry B. Anthony (RU)

==== South Carolina ====
2. Vacant
3. Vacant

==== Tennessee ====
1. Vacant
2. Vacant

==== Texas ====
1. Vacant
2. Vacant

==== Vermont ====
▌1. Solomon Foot (RU)
▌3. Jacob Collamer (RU)

==== Virginia ====
▌1. Lemuel J. Bowden (U), died January 2, 1864, vacant thereafter
▌▌2. John S. Carlile (U)

==== West Virginia ====
▌1. Peter G. Van Winkle (RU), from August 4, 1863 (newly admitted state)
▌2. Waitman T. Willey (RU), from August 4, 1863 (newly admitted state)

==== Wisconsin ====
▌1. James R. Doolittle (RU)
▌3. Timothy O. Howe (RU)

Senate composition by state 2 Republican–Union senators 2 Democratic senators 2 Unionist senators 1 Democratic and 1 Unionist senator

=== House of Representatives ===
==== Alabama ====
1. Vacant
2. Vacant
3. Vacant
4. Vacant
5. Vacant
6. Vacant

==== Arkansas ====
1. Vacant
2. Vacant
3. Vacant

==== California ====
All representatives were elected statewide on a general ticket.

▌At-large. Cornelius Cole (RU)
▌At-large. William Higby (RU)
▌At-large. Thomas B. Shannon (RU)

==== Connecticut ====
▌1. Henry C. Deming (RU)
▌2. James E. English (D)
▌3. Augustus Brandegee (RU)
▌4. John H. Hubbard (RU)

==== Delaware ====
▌At-large. William Temple (D), until May 28, 1863

▌Nathaniel B. Smithers (RU), from December 7, 1863

==== Florida ====
At-large. Vacant

==== Georgia ====
1. Vacant
2. Vacant
3. Vacant
4. Vacant
5. Vacant
6. Vacant
7. Vacant

==== Illinois ====
▌1. Isaac N. Arnold (RU)
▌2. John F. Farnsworth (RU)
▌3. Elihu B. Washburne (RU)
▌4. Charles M. Harris (D)
▌5. Owen Lovejoy (RU), until March 25, 1864

▌Ebon C. Ingersoll (RU), from May 20, 1864

▌6. Jesse O. Norton (RU)
▌7. John R. Eden (D)
▌8. John T. Stuart (D)
▌9. Lewis Winans Ross (D)
▌10. Anthony L. Knapp (D)
▌11. James C. Robinson (D)
▌12. William R. Morrison (D)
▌13. William J. Allen (D)
▌At-large. James C. Allen (D)

==== Indiana ====
▌1. John Law (D)
▌2. James A. Cravens (D)
▌3. Henry W. Harrington (D)
▌4. William S. Holman (D)
▌5. George W. Julian (RU)
▌6. Ebenezer Dumont (RU)
▌7. Daniel W. Voorhees (D)
▌8. Godlove S. Orth (RU)
▌9. Schuyler Colfax (RU)
▌10. Joseph K. Edgerton (D)
▌11. James F. McDowell (D)

==== Iowa ====
▌1. James F. Wilson (RU)
▌2. Hiram Price (RU)
▌3. William B. Allison (RU)
▌4. Josiah B. Grinnell (RU)
▌5. John A. Kasson (RU)
▌6. Asahel W. Hubbard (RU)

==== Kansas ====
▌At-large. A. Carter Wilder (RU)

==== Kentucky ====
▌▌1. Lucien Anderson (UD (Note: Switched to Republican–Union at the start of Congress.))
▌2. George H. Yeaman (UD)
▌3. Henry Grider (UD)
▌4. Aaron Harding (UD)
▌5. Robert Mallory (UD)
▌▌6. Green C. Smith (UUD)
▌▌7. Brutus J. Clay (UD)
▌8. William H. Randall (UD)
▌9. William H. Wadsworth (UD)

==== Louisiana ====
1. Vacant
2. Vacant
3. Vacant
4. Vacant
5. Vacant

==== Maine ====
▌1. Lorenzo D.M. Sweat (D)
▌2. Sidney Perham (RU)
▌3. James G. Blaine (RU)
▌4. John H. Rice (RU)
▌5. Frederick A. Pike (RU)

==== Maryland ====
▌1. John A. J. Creswell (RU)
▌2. Edwin H. Webster (RU)
▌3. Henry Winter Davis (RU)
▌4. Francis Thomas (RU)
▌5. Benjamin G. Harris (D)

==== Massachusetts ====
▌1. Thomas D. Eliot (RU)
▌2. Oakes Ames (RU)
▌3. Alexander H. Rice (RU)
▌4. Samuel Hooper (RU)
▌5. John B. Alley (RU)
▌6. Daniel W. Gooch (RU)
▌7. George S. Boutwell (RU)
▌8. John D. Baldwin (RU)
▌9. William B. Washburn (RU)
▌10. Henry L. Dawes (RU)

==== Michigan ====
▌1. Fernando C. Beaman (RU)
▌2. Charles Upson (RU)
▌3. John W. Longyear (RU)
▌4. Francis W. Kellogg (RU)
▌5. Augustus C. Baldwin (D)
▌6. John F. Driggs (RU)

==== Minnesota ====
▌1. William Windom (RU)
▌2. Ignatius L. Donnelly (RU)

==== Mississippi ====
1. Vacant
2. Vacant
3. Vacant
4. Vacant
5. Vacant

==== Missouri ====
▌1. Francis P. Blair Jr. (RU), until June 10, 1864

▌Samuel Knox (RU), from June 10, 1864

▌2. Henry T. Blow (RU)
▌3. John W. Noell (RU), until March 14, 1863

▌John G. Scott (D), from December 7, 1863

▌4. Sempronius H. Boyd (RU)
▌5. Joseph W. McClurg (RU)
▌6. Austin A. King (D)
▌7. Benjamin F. Loan (RU)
▌8. William A. Hall (D)
▌9. James S. Rollins (C (Note: Switched to Democratic during the Congress.))

==== Nevada ====
▌At-large. Henry G. Worthington (RU), from October 31, 1864 (newly admitted state)

==== New Hampshire ====
▌1. Daniel Marcy (D)
▌2. Edward H. Rollins (RU)
▌3. James W. Patterson (RU)

==== New Jersey ====
▌1. John F. Starr (RU)
▌2. George Middleton (D)
▌3. William G. Steele (D)
▌4. Andrew J. Rogers (D)
▌5. Nehemiah Perry (D)

==== New York ====
▌1. Henry G. Stebbins (D), until October 24, 1864

▌Dwight Townsend (D), from December 5, 1864

▌2. Martin Kalbfleisch (D)
▌3. Moses F. Odell (D)
▌4. Benjamin Wood (D)
▌5. Fernando Wood (D)
▌6. Elijah Ward (D)
▌7. John W. Chanler (D)
▌8. James Brooks (D)
▌9. Anson Herrick (D)
▌10. William Radford (D)
▌11. Charles H. Winfield (D)
▌12. Homer A. Nelson (D)
▌13. John B. Steele (D)
▌14. Erastus Corning (D), until October 5, 1863

▌John V. L. Pruyn (D), from December 7, 1863

▌15. John Augustus Griswold (D)
▌16. Orlando Kellogg (RU)
▌17. Calvin T. Hulburd (RU)
▌18. James M. Marvin (RU)
▌19. Samuel F. Miller (RU)
▌20. Ambrose W. Clark (RU)
▌21. Francis Kernan (D)
▌22. DeWitt C. Littlejohn (RU)
▌23. Thomas T. Davis (RU)
▌24. Theodore M. Pomeroy (RU)
▌25. Daniel Morris (RU)
▌26. Giles W. Hotchkiss (RU)
▌27. Robert B. Van Valkenburgh (RU)
▌28. Freeman Clarke (RU)
▌29. Augustus Frank (RU)
▌30. John Ganson (D)
▌31. Reuben E. Fenton (RU), until December 20, 1864

==== North Carolina ====
1. Vacant
2. Vacant
3. Vacant
4. Vacant
5. Vacant
6. Vacant
7. Vacant

==== Ohio ====
▌1. George H. Pendleton (D)
▌2. Alexander Long (D)
▌3. Robert C. Schenck (RU)
▌4. John F. McKinney (D)
▌5. Francis C. Le Blond (D)
▌6. Chilton A. White (D)
▌7. Samuel S. Cox (D)
▌8. William Johnston (D)
▌9. Warren P. Noble (D)
▌10. James M. Ashley (RU)
▌11. Wells A. Hutchins (D)
▌12. William E. Finck (D)
▌13. John O'Neill (D)
▌14. George Bliss (D)
▌15. James R. Morris (D)
▌16. Joseph W. White (D)
▌17. Ephraim R. Eckley (RU)
▌18. Rufus P. Spalding (RU)
▌19. James A. Garfield (RU)

==== Oregon ====
▌At-large. John R. McBride (RU)

==== Pennsylvania ====
▌1. Samuel J. Randall (D)
▌2. Charles O'Neill (RU)
▌3. Leonard Myers (RU)
▌4. William D. Kelley (RU)
▌5. M. Russell Thayer (RU)
▌6. John D. Stiles (D)
▌7. John M. Broomall (RU)
▌8. Sydenham E. Ancona (D)
▌9. Thaddeus Stevens (RU)
▌10. Myer Strouse (D)
▌11. Philip Johnson (D)
▌12. Charles Denison (D)
▌13. Henry W. Tracy (IR)
▌14. William H. Miller (D)
▌15. Joseph Bailey (D)
▌16. Alexander H. Coffroth (D)
▌17. Archibald McAllister (D)
▌18. James T. Hale (IR)
▌19. Glenni W. Scofield (RU)
▌20. Amos Myers (RU)
▌21. John L. Dawson (D)
▌22. James K. Moorhead (RU)
▌23. Thomas Williams (RU)
▌24. Jesse Lazear (D)

==== Rhode Island ====
▌1. Thomas A. Jenckes (RU)
▌2. Nathan F. Dixon Jr. (RU)

==== South Carolina ====
1. Vacant
2. Vacant
3. Vacant
4. Vacant

==== Tennessee ====
1. Vacant
2. Vacant
3. Vacant
4. Vacant
5. Vacant
6. Vacant
7. Vacant
8. Vacant

==== Texas ====
1. Vacant
2. Vacant
3. Vacant
4. Vacant

==== Vermont ====
▌1. Frederick E. Woodbridge (RU)
▌2. Justin S. Morrill (RU)
▌3. Portus Baxter (RU)

==== Virginia ====
1. Vacant
2. Vacant
3. Vacant
4. Vacant
5. Vacant
6. Vacant
7. Vacant
8. Vacant
9. Vacant, moved to West Virginia June 20, 1863
10. Vacant, moved to West Virginia June 20, 1863
11. Vacant, moved to West Virginia June 20, 1863

==== West Virginia ====
▌1. Jacob B. Blair (RU), from December 7, 1863 (newly admitted state)
▌2. William G. Brown Sr. (RU), from December 7, 1863 (newly admitted state)
▌3. Kellian Whaley (RU), from December 7, 1863 (newly admitted state)

==== Wisconsin ====
▌1. James S. Brown (D)
▌2. Ithamar C. Sloan (RU)
▌3. Amasa Cobb (RU)
▌4. Charles A. Eldredge (D)
▌5. Ezra Wheeler (D)
▌6. Walter D. McIndoe (RU)

==== Non-voting members ====
▌Arizona Territory. Charles D. Poston (RU), from December 5, 1864
▌Colorado Territory. Hiram P. Bennet (RU)
▌Dakota Territory. William Jayne (RU), until June 17, 1864

▌John B. S. Todd (D), from June 17, 1864

▌Idaho Territory. William H. Wallace (RU), from February 1, 1864
▌Montana Territory. Samuel McLean (D), from January 6, 1865
▌Nebraska Territory. Samuel G. Daily (RU)
▌Nevada Territory. Gordon N. Mott (RU), until October 31, 1864
▌New Mexico Territory. Francisco Perea (RU)
▌Utah Territory. John F. Kinney (D)
▌Washington Territory. George E. Cole (D)

House composition by district Held by Republican–Unionists Held by Democrats Held by Union Democrats Held by Independent Republican–Unionists Held by Unconditional Union Democrats Held by War Democrats Held by Conservative Unionists

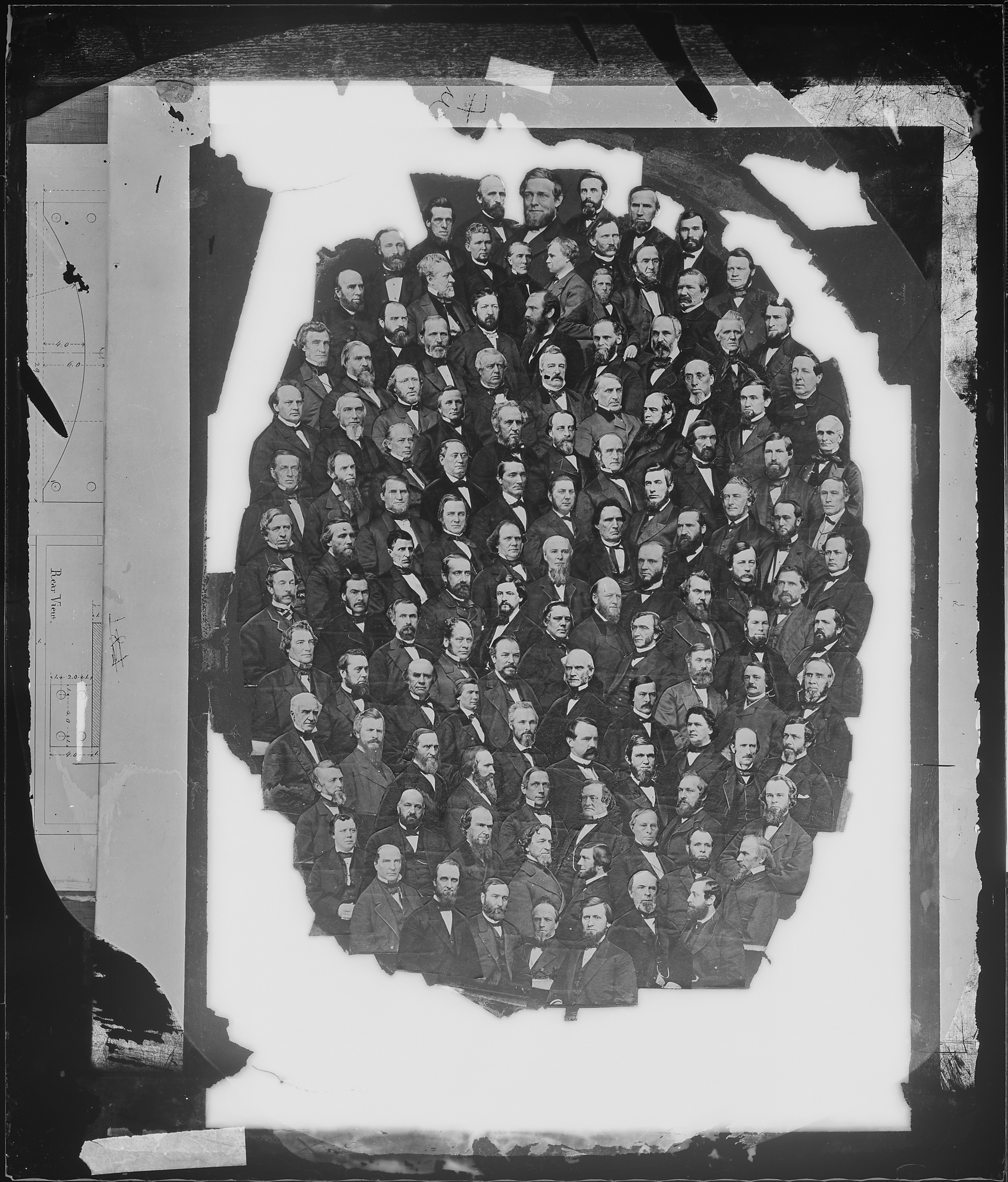
Group photo of the U.S. House of Representatives, in 1863, during this Congress.

== Changes in membership ==
The count below reflects changes from the beginning of the first session of this Congress.

=== Senate ===
- Replacements: 2
  - Democratic: no net change
  - Republican–Union: no net change
  - Union: no net change
- Deaths: 1
- Resignations: 2
- Interim appointments: 1
- Seats of newly admitted states: 4
- Total seats with changes: 4

Senate changes
State (class)	Vacated by	Reason for change	Successor	Date of successor's formal installation (Note: When seated or oath administered, not necessarily when service began.)
West Virginia (1)	New seat	West Virginia admitted to the Union June 19, 1863. Its first Senators were elected August 4, 1863.	Peter G. Van Winkle (RU)	August 4, 1863
West Virginia (2)	New seat	West Virginia admitted to the Union June 19, 1863. Its first Senators were elected August 4, 1863.	Waitman T. Willey (RU)	August 4, 1863
Missouri (3)	Robert Wilson (U)	Successor elected for Sen. Waldo P. Johnson November 13, 1863.	B. Gratz Brown (RU)	November 13, 1863
Virginia (1)	Lemuel J. Bowden (U)	Died January 2, 1864.	Vacant	Not filled this Congress
Delaware (1)	James A. Bayard Jr. (D)	Resigned January 29, 1864, for unknown reasons. Successor elected January 29, 1864.	George R. Riddle (D)	February 2, 1864
Maine (2)	William P. Fessenden (RU)	Resigned July 1, 1864, to become U.S. Secretary of the Treasury. Successor appointed October 27, 1864, to finish the term.	Nathan A. Farwell (RU)	October 27, 1864
Nevada (1)	New seat	Nevada admitted to the Union October 31, 1864. Its first Senators were elected February 1, 1865.	William M. Stewart (RU)	February 1, 1865
Nevada (3)	New seat	Nevada admitted to the Union October 31, 1864. Its first Senators were elected February 1, 1865.	James W. Nye (RU)	February 1, 1865
Maryland (3)	Thomas H. Hicks (RU)	Died February 14, 1865.	Vacant	Not filled this Congress.

=== House of Representatives ===
- Replacements: 6
  - Democratic: no net change
  - Republican–Union: no net change
  - Union Democratic: no net change
  - Conservative: no net change
  - Unconditional Union Democratic: no net change
  - Independent Republican: no net change
- Deaths: 3
- Resignations: 3
- Contested election: 1
- Seats of newly admitted seats: 4
- Total seats with changes: 7

House changes
District	Vacated by	Reason for change	Successor	Date of successor's formal installation
Arizona Territory At-large	Vacant	Territory organized in previous congress. Seat remained vacant until December 5, 1864.	Charles D. Poston (RU)	December 5, 1864
Missouri 3rd	John W. Noell (RU)	Died March 14, 1863.	John G. Scott (D)	December 7, 1863
Delaware At-large	William Temple (D)	Died May 28, 1863.	Nathaniel B. Smithers (RU)	December 7, 1863
New York 14th	Erastus Corning (D)	Resigned October 5, 1863.	John V. L. Pruyn (D)	December 7, 1863
West Virginia 1st	New state	West Virginia admitted to the Union June 19, 1863. Seat remained vacant until December 7, 1863.	Jacob B. Blair (RU)	December 7, 1863
West Virginia 2nd	New state	West Virginia admitted to the Union June 19, 1863. Seat remained vacant until December 7, 1863.	William G. Brown Sr. (RU)	December 7, 1863
West Virginia 3rd	New state	West Virginia admitted to the Union June 19, 1863. Seat remained vacant until December 7, 1863.	Kellian Whaley (RU)	December 7, 1863
Idaho Territory At-large	New territory	Territory organized February 1, 1864.	William H. Wallace (RU)	February 1, 1864
Illinois 5th	Owen Lovejoy (RU)	Died March 25, 1864.	Ebon C. Ingersoll (RU)	May 20, 1864
Montana Territory At-large	New territory	Territory organized May 26, 1864. Seat remained vacant until January 6, 1865.	Samuel McLean (D)	January 6, 1865
Missouri 1st	Francis P. Blair Jr. (RU)	Lost contested election June 10, 1864	Samuel Knox (RU)	June 10, 1864
Dakota Territory At-large	William Jayne	Lost contested election June 17, 1864	John B. S. Todd (D)	June 17, 1864
New York 1st	Henry G. Stebbins (D)	Resigned October 24, 1864.	Dwight Townsend (D)	December 5, 1864
Nevada Territory At-large	Gordon N. Mott (RU)	Nevada achieved statehood October 31, 1864	District eliminated	
Nevada At-large	New state	Nevada admitted to the Union October 31, 1864.	Henry G. Worthington (RU)	October 31, 1864
New York 31st	Reuben Fenton (RU)	Resigned December 20, 1864, after being elected Governor of New York.	Vacant	Not filled this Congress

== Committees ==
Lists of committees and their party leaders for members of the House and Senate committees can be found through the Official Congressional Directory at the bottom of this article. The directory after the pages of terms of service lists committees of the Senate, House (Standing with Subcommittees, Select and Special) and Joint and, after that, House/Senate committee assignments. On the committees section of the House and Senate in the Official Congressional Directory, the committee's members on the first row on the left side shows the chairman of the committee and on the right side shows the ranking member of the committee.

=== Senate ===
- Agriculture (John Sherman, chair)
- Audit and Control the Contingent Expenses of the Senate (James Dixon, chair)
- Claims (Daniel Clark, chair)
- Commerce (Zachariah Chandler, chair)
- Distributing Public Revenue Among the States (Select)
- District of Columbia (James W. Grimes, chair)
- Engrossed Bills (Henry S. Lane, chair)
- Finance (William P. Fessenden, chair)
- Foreign Relations (Charles Sumner, chair)
- Indian Affairs (James Rood Doolittle, chair)
- Judiciary (Lyman Trumbull, chair)
- Manufactures (Zachariah Chandler, chair)
- Military Affairs (Henry Wilson, chair)
- Naval Affairs (John P. Hale, chair)
- Naval Supplies (Select)
- Ordnance and War Ships (Select)
- Overland Mail Service (Select)
- Pacific Railroad (Select) (Jacob M. Howard, chair)
- Patents and the Patent Office (Edgar Cowan, chair)
- Pensions (La Fayette S. Foster, chair)
- Post Office and Post Roads (Jacob Collamer, chair)
- Private Land Claims (Ira Harris, chair)
- Public Buildings and Grounds (Solomon Foot, chair)
- Public Lands (James Harlan, chair)
- Retrenchment (N/A, chair)
- Revolutionary Claims (Morton S. Wilkinson, chair)
- Slavery and the Treatment of Freedmen (Select)
- Tariff Regulation (Select)
- Territories (Benjamin F. Wade, chair)
- Whole

=== House of Representatives ===
- Accounts (Edward H. Rollins, chair)
- Agriculture (Brutus J. Clay, chair)
- Banking and Currency (N/A, chair)
- Bankrupt Law (Select)
- Claims (James T. Hale, chair)
- Commerce (Elihu B. Washburne, chair)
- District of Columbia (Owen Lovejoy, chair)
- Elections (Henry L. Dawes, chair)
- Expenditures in the Interior Department (Thomas B. Shannon, chair)
- Expenditures in the Navy Department (Portus Baxter, chair)
- Expenditures in the Post Office Department (Theodore M. Pomeroy, chair)
- Expenditures in the State Department (Frederick A. Pike, chair)
- Expenditures in the Treasury Department (Amos Myers, chair)
- Expenditures in the War Department (Henry C. Deming, chair)
- Expenditures on Public Buildings (John W. Longyear, chair)
- Foreign Affairs (Henry Winter Davis, chair)
- Indian Affairs (William Windom, chair)
- Invalid Pensions (Kellian V. Whaley, chair)
- Judiciary (James F. Wilson, chair)
- Manufactures (James K. Moorhead, chair)
- Mileage (James C. Robinson, chair)
- Military Affairs (Robert C. Schenck, chair)
- Militia (Robert B. Van Valkenburgh, chair)
- Naval Affairs (Alexander H. Rice, chair)
- Patents (Thomas A. Jenckes, chair)
- Post Office and Post Roads (John B. Alley, chair)
- Private Land Claims (M. Russell Thayer, chair)
- Public Buildings and Grounds (John H. Rice, chair)
- Public Expenditures (Calvin T. Hulburd, chair)
- Public Lands (George W. Julian, chair)
- Revisal and Unfinished Business (Sempronius H. Boyd, chair)
- Revolutionary Claims (Hiram Price, chair)
- Revolutionary Pensions (Dewitt C. Littlejohn, chair)
- Roads and Canals (Isaac N. Arnold, chair)
- Rules (Select)
- Standards of Official Conduct
- Territories (James M. Ashley, chair)
- Ways and Means (Thaddeus Stevens, chair)
- Whole

=== Joint appointments ===
- Conditions of Indian Tribes (Special)
- Conduct of the War
- Enrolled Bills (Sen. Timothy Howe, chair)
- The Library (Sen. Jacob Collamer, chair)
- Printing (Sen. Henry B. Anthony, chair)
- Senate Chamber and the Hall of the House of Representatives

== Caucuses ==
- Democratic (House)
- Democratic (Senate)

== Employees ==
=== Legislative branch agency directors ===
- Architect of the Capitol: Thomas U. Walter
- Librarian of Congress: John Gould Stephenson, until 1864
  - Ainsworth Rand Spofford, from 1864

=== Senate ===
- Chaplain: Byron Sunderland (Presbyterian), until May 11, 1864
  - Thomas Bowman (Methodist), elected May 11, 1864
- Secretary: John W. Forney
- Sergeant at Arms: George T. Brown

=== House of Representatives ===
- Chaplain: William H. Channing (Unitarian)
- Clerk: Emerson Etheridge, until December 7, 1863
  - Edward McPherson, from December 7, 1863
- Doorkeeper: Ira Goodnow
- Messenger: Thaddeus Morrice
  - William D. Todd
- Postmaster: William S. King
- Sergeant at Arms: Edward Ball, until December 7, 1863
  - Nehemiah G. Ordway, from December 7, 1863

== See also ==
- 1862 United States elections (elections leading to this Congress)
  - 1862–63 United States Senate elections
  - 1862–63 United States House of Representatives elections
- 1864 United States elections (elections during this Congress, leading to the next Congress)
  - 1864 United States presidential election
  - 1864–65 United States Senate elections
  - 1864–65 United States House of Representatives elections

== Bibliography ==
=== Primary sources ===
- Greeley, Horace, ed. (1863). The Tribune Almanac and Political Register for 1863. New York.
- Greeley, Horace, ed. (1864). The Tribune Almanac and Political Register for 1864. New York.
- Greeley, Horace, ed. (1865). The Tribune Almanac and Political Register for 1865. New York.

=== Secondary sources ===
- Dubin, Michael J. (March 1, 1998). United States Congressional Elections, 1788–1997: The Official Results of the Elections of the 1st through 105th Congresses. Jefferson, N.C.: McFarland and Company. ISBN 978-0-7864-0283-0.
- Hood, James Larry (July 1978). "For the Union: Kentucky's Unconditional Unionist Congressmen and the Development of the Republican Party in Kentucky, 1863–1865". Register of the Kentucky Historical Society. 76 (3): 197–215. JSTOR 23378981.
- Martis, Kenneth C. (1989). The Historical Atlas of Political Parties in the United States Congress. New York: Macmillan Publishing Company.
- Martis, Kenneth C. (1982). The Historical Atlas of United States Congressional Districts. New York: Macmillan Publishing Company.
- Mering, John (April 1959). "The Political Transition of James S. Rollins". Missouri Historical Review. 53 (3): 217–226.
