= Hodges House (Carrollton, Illinois) =

Historic house in Illinois, United States

- U.S. National Register of Historic Places
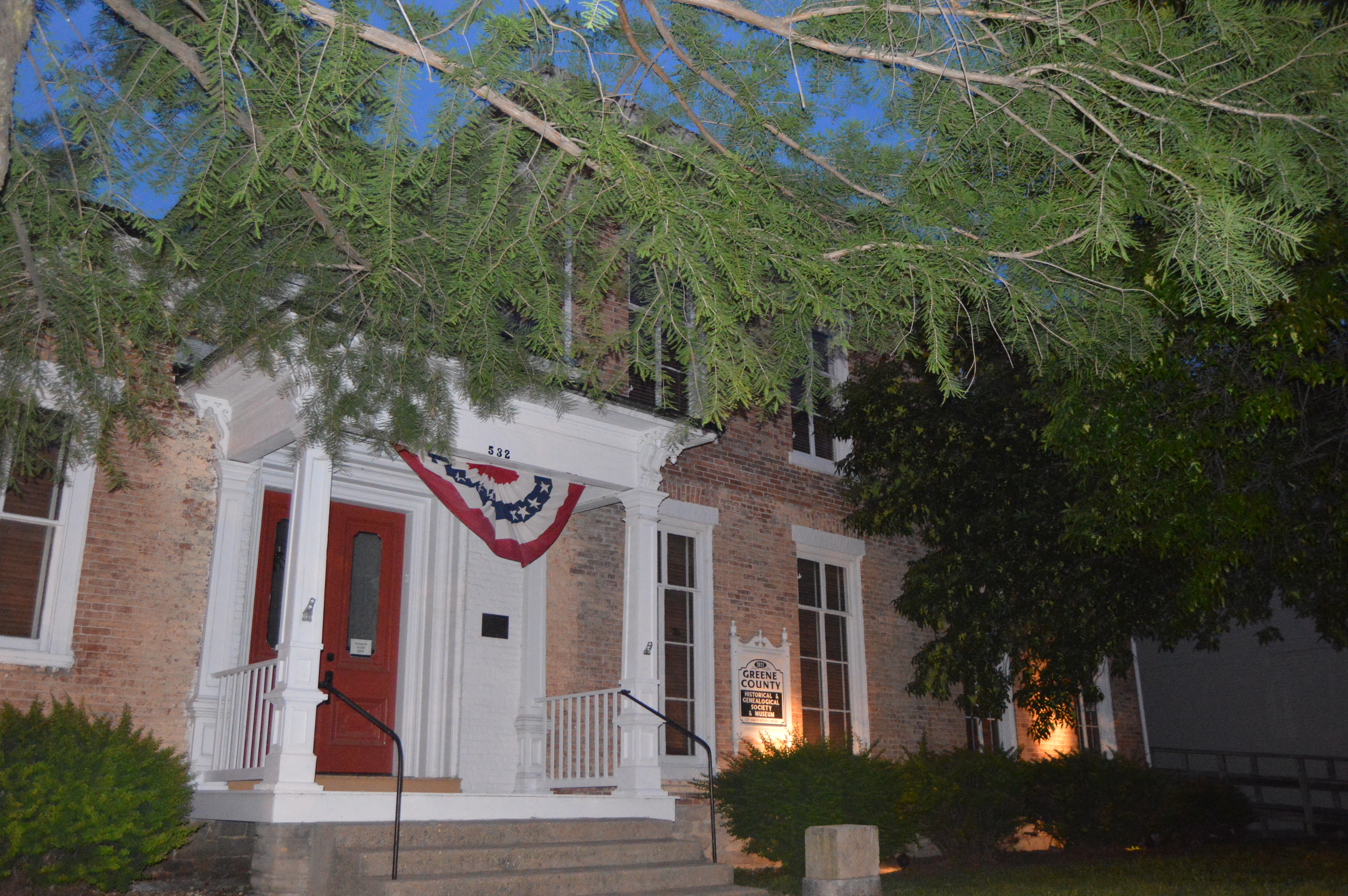
- Front of the house

- Location within Illinois Location within the United States
- Location: 532 N. Main St., Carrollton, Illinois
- Coordinates: 39°17′48″N 90°24′29″W
- Area: less than one acre
- Built: 1825
- Architect: Stevens, Moses
- Architectural style: Italianate, Federal
- NRHP reference No.: 80001364
- Added to NRHP: November 3, 1980

The Hodges House is a historic house located at 532 N. Main St. in Carrollton, Illinois, United States. The house was built circa 1825 and remodeled in the Federal style in 1829. Lawyer Charles D. Hodges purchased the house in 1850; soon afterward, he expanded the house and added Italianate features, such as the paired brackets along the roof line. Hodges served as a Greene County judge from 1853 until 1859, when he was elected to the U.S. House of Representatives to replace the deceased Thomas L. Harris. Hodges returned to his law practice when Harris' term ended later in 1859; he later served as a circuit judge and a state senator.

The house was added to the National Register of Historic Places on November 3, 1980. The Greene County Historical and Genealogical Society currently uses the house as a local history museum known as the Lee-Baker-Hodges House.
