= Charles D. Hodges =

American politician

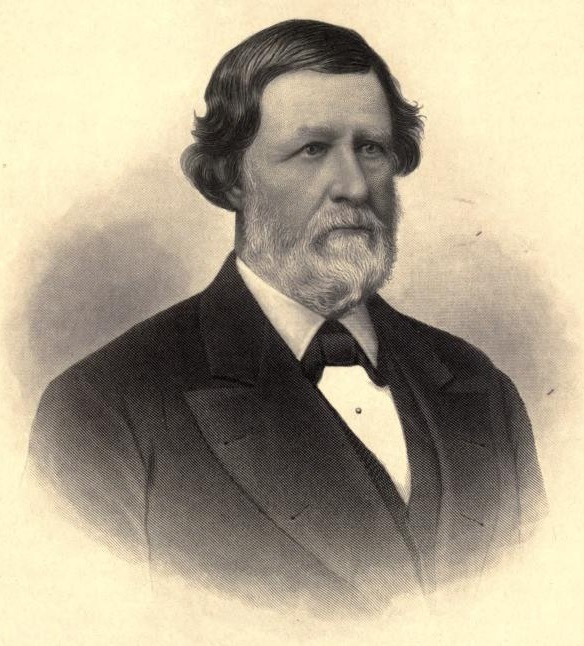
- From Volume II (1899) of The Bench and Bar of Illinois

Member of the U.S. House of Representatives from Illinois's 6th district
- In office January 4, 1859 – March 3, 1859
- Preceded by: Thomas L. Harris
- Succeeded by: John Alexander McClernand

Personal details
- Born: February 4, 1810 Talbot County, Maryland, U.S.
- Died: April 1, 1884 (aged 74) Carrollton, Illinois, U.S.
- Party: Democratic
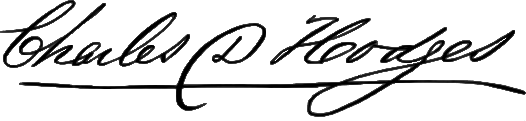
- Signature

Charles Drury Hodges (February 4, 1810 – April 1, 1884) was a U.S. representative from Illinois.

== Biography ==
Born in Talbot County, Maryland, Hodges attended the public schools and graduated from Trinity College, Hartford, Connecticut, in 1829. He studied law in Annapolis, Maryland, gaining admission to the bar in 1831 and commencing practice in Annapolis.

He moved to Carrollton, Illinois, in 1833 and resumed the practice of law, also engaging in the mercantile business for a short time. He served as member of the Illinois House of Representatives from 1851 to 1853, and was elected judge of Greene County, Illinois, in 1854. He was reelected for a four-year term in 1858 but resigned in 1859 having been elected to Congress. He was also secretary and treasurer of the St. Louis, Jacksonville & Chicago Railroad in 1858, and afterward director for many years.

Hodges was elected as a Democrat to the Thirty-fifth Congress to fill the vacancy caused by the death of Thomas L. Harris and served from January 4 to March 3, 1859. He was not a candidate for election to fill the vacancy in the Thirty-sixth Congress, caused also by the death of Mr. Harris.

He resumed the practice of law in Carrollton, Illinois. He was a circuit judge from 1867 to 1873, and served as member of the Illinois State Senate from 1873 to 1877. After his legislative service, he again practiced law in Carrollton, Illinois, until his death April 1, 1884. He was interred in the City Cemetery.

Hodges' house in Carrollton is listed on the National Register of Historic Places.

U.S. House of Representatives
Preceded by Thomas L. Harris	Member of the U.S. House of Representatives from Illinois's 6th congressional district January 4, 1859 - March 3, 1859	Succeeded by John A. McClernand
