= John A. McClernand =

American politician and Union general (1812–1900)

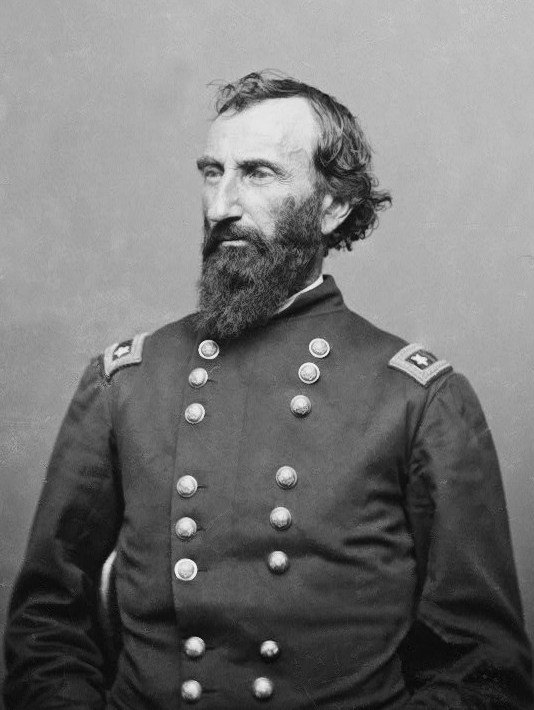
- Photograph c. 1861–1865

Member of the United States House of Representatives for Illinois' 6th congressional district
- In office November 8, 1859 – October 28, 1861
- Preceded by: Charles D. Hodges
- Succeeded by: Anthony L. Knapp

Member of the United States House of Representatives for Illinois' 2nd congressional district
- In office March 4, 1843 – March 3, 1851
- Preceded by: Zadok Casey
- Succeeded by: Willis Allen

Member of the Illinois House of Representatives
- In office 1840–1843
- In office 1836

Personal details
- Born: John Alexander McClernand; May 30, 1812 Breckinridge County, Kentucky, U.S.
- Died: September 20, 1900 (aged 88) Springfield, Illinois, U.S.
- Party: Democratic
- Spouse(s): Sarah McClernand, Minerva McClernand
- Children: Edward John McClernand
- Occupation: Military officer
- Profession: Politician, lawyer

Military service
- Allegiance: United States
- Branch/service: United States Army; Union Army
- Years of service: 1832, 1861–1864
- Rank: Major General of Volunteers
- Battles/wars: Black Hawk War; American Civil War; Battle of Belmont; Battle of Fort Donelson; Battle of Shiloh; Battle of Arkansas Post; Battle of Champion Hill; Siege of Vicksburg; Red River Campaign

John Alexander McClernand (May 30, 1812 – September 20, 1900) was an American lawyer, politician, and a Union Army general in the American Civil War. He was a prominent Democratic politician in Illinois and a member of the United States House of Representatives before the war. McClernand was firmly dedicated to the principles of Jacksonian democracy and supported the Compromise of 1850.

McClernand was commissioned a brigadier general of volunteers in 1861. His was a classic case of the politician-in-uniform coming into conflict with career Army officers, graduates of the United States Military Academy. He served as a subordinate commander under Ulysses S. Grant in the Western Theater, fighting in the campaigns of Belmont, operations on the Tennessee and Cumberland rivers, Shiloh in 1861–62 and later briefly as a commander of the Army of the Mississippi in late 1862 to early 1863, afterwards serving as a corps commander under Grant again during the campaign against Vicksburg.

A friend and political ally of Abraham Lincoln, McClernand was given permission to muster a large force to conduct offensive operations against the Confederate stronghold at Vicksburg, Mississippi, a campaign that would rival the effort of General Grant, his department commander. Grant and Halleck machinated against McClernand, and most of the troops he raised in Illinois for his expedition were instead diverted to Grant's army without McClernand's knowledge. Later on, McClernand's own expeditionary force departed southwards before his arrival, by design, commanded by General William T. Sherman, an ally of Grant. McClernand chased after his expedition southwards and assumed command, designating this expeditionary force as the Army of the Mississippi. Grant was later able to neutralize McClernand's independent effort after it conducted an expedition to capture the vital Fort Hindman on the Arkansas river; this unassuming victory had secured an important milestone in the future of the operations around the Mississippi river for months to come, and McClernand became the senior corps commander in Grant's army for the Vicksburg Campaign in 1863. During the Siege of Vicksburg, Grant relieved McClernand of his command by citing his intemperate and unauthorized communication with the press, finally putting an end to a rivalry that had caused Grant discomfort since the beginning of the war. McClernand left the Army in 1864 and served as a judge and a politician in the postbellum era.

== Early life and political career ==
McClernand was born in Breckinridge County, Kentucky, near Hardinsburg, on May 30, 1812, but in 1816, his family moved to Shawneetown, Illinois. His early life and career were similar to that of another Illinois lawyer of the time, Abraham Lincoln, with whom he was a friend. Largely self-educated, he was admitted to the Illinois bar in 1832. In that same year he served as a volunteer private in the Black Hawk War (Lincoln briefly served as a captain.)

In 1835 McClernand founded the Shawneetown Democrat newspaper, which he edited. As a Democrat he served in 1836 and from 1840 to 1843 in the Illinois House of Representatives.

He served in the United States House of Representatives from March 4, 1843, until March 3, 1851. A bombastic orator, his political philosophy was based on Jacksonian principles. McClernand vigorously opposed the Wilmot Proviso when it was introduced in 1846, 1847 and 1848. He disliked abolitionists which generated favor among his constituents, many of whom were originally natives of slaveholding states. Nonetheless, historian Allan Nevins described him as a general favorite in Congress in 1850 as being a man of courtesy and urbanity. On the other hand, John Hay later described him as "a vain, irritable, overbearing, exacting man." Nevins himself described McClernand in 1861 as an independent brigadier with "a headlong, testy, irascible manner." He was an important ally to Illinois Senator Stephen A. Douglas. Douglas played a crucial role in formulating the Compromise of 1850, and McClernand served as a liaison for him in the House of Representatives during the debate over the proposed compromise. McClernand also served as Chairman of the Committee on Public Lands from 1845 to 1847 and on the Committee on Foreign Affairs from 1849 to 1851. In 1850, McClernand declined to be a candidate for renomination, and his term expired in 1851. In the eight years he was out of Congress, he developed a large law practice and engaged in land speculation.

In 1859, McClernand was again elected to the House to fill a vacancy caused by the death of Thomas L. Harris. His term began on November 8. He was a strong Unionist and introduced the resolution of July 15, 1861, pledging money and men to the national government. In 1860 he was defeated in a bid for the speakership of the House of Representatives. The small coalition of Democratic representatives from Alabama and South Carolina opposing him objected to his moderate views on slavery and the importance of retaining the Union.

McClernand supported the campaign of his friend, Stephen Douglas, in the 1860 presidential election. He served as one of his campaign managers during the divisive Democratic presidential nomination convention held in Charleston, South Carolina in 1860.

In November 1842, McClernand married Sarah Dunlap of Jacksonville, Illinois, a close friend of Mary Todd Lincoln. Sarah was a daughter of James Dunlap, who served as a quartermaster in the Union Army during the Civil War, resigning as lieutenant colonel and quartermaster of the XIII Corps of the Army of the Tennessee on June 11, 1864. (Note: On December 11, 1866, President Andrew Johnson nominated Dunlap for appointment to the grade of brevet brigadier general of volunteers to rank from March 13, 1865. The appointment was confirmed by the United States Senate on February 6, 1867. John H. Eicher, p. 744.) John and Sarah's son, Edward John McClernand, was notable as a West Point graduate in 1870, U.S. Army brigadier general in the Indian Wars, Medal of Honor recipient and later fought in the Philippines. After Sarah's death on May 8, 1861, McClernand married her sister, Minerva Dunlap on December 23, 1862.

== Civil War ==
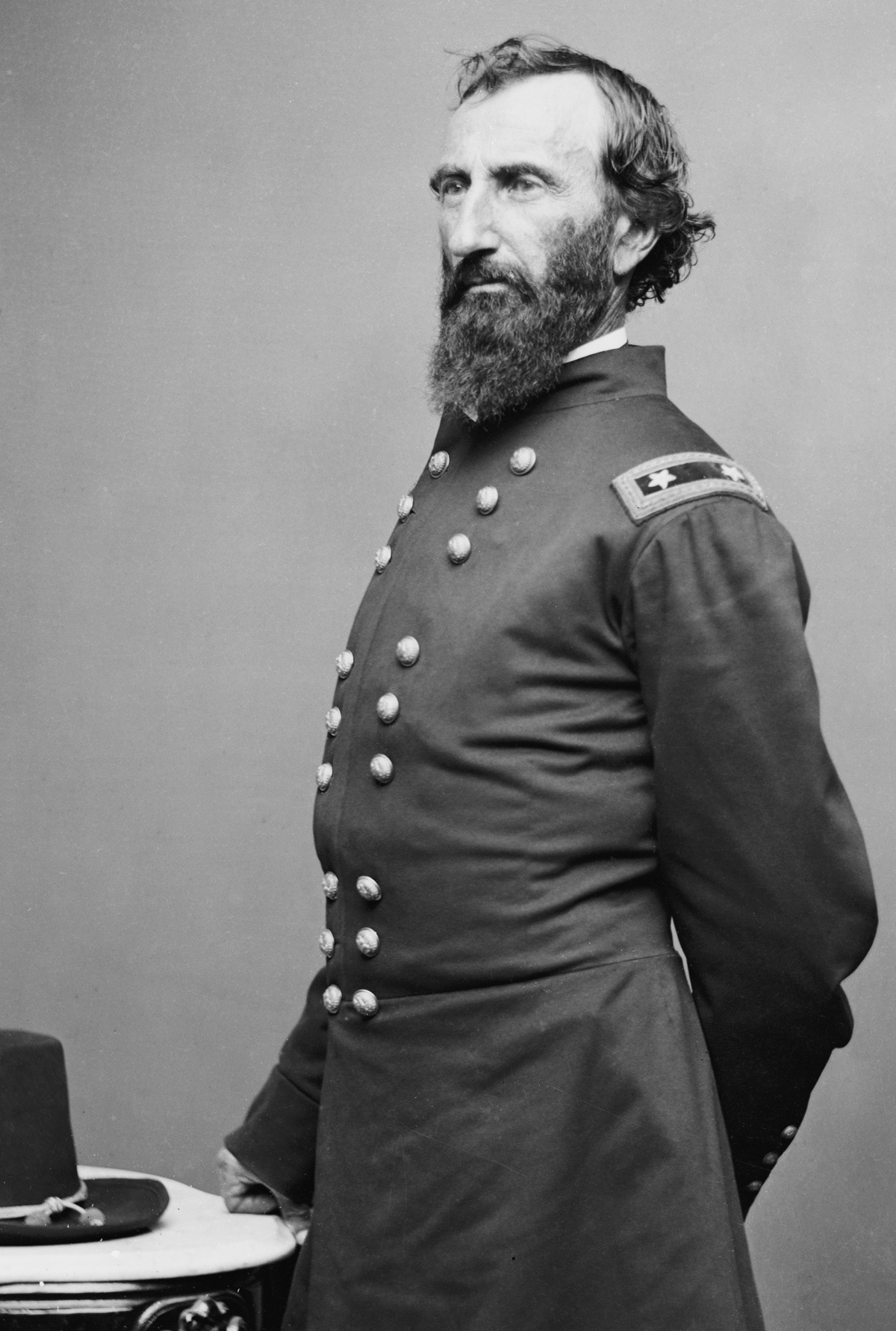
General McClernand during the Civil War

=== McClernand's brigade at Cairo ===
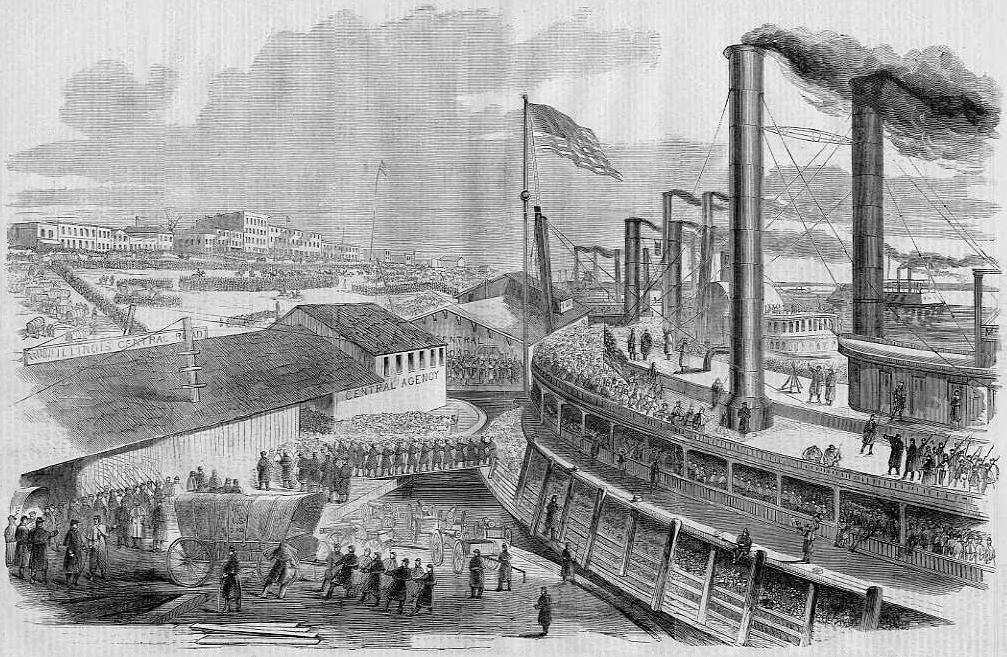
Embarkation of General McClernand's Brigade at Cairo -- the Advance of the Great Mississippi Expedition -- January 10, 1862

Upon the outbreak of the American Civil War, McClernand raised the "McClernand Brigade" in Illinois, and was appointed brigadier general of volunteers on August 7, 1861, to rank from May 17, 1861. His commission as a general was based on Lincoln's desire to retain political connections with the Democrats of Southern Illinois, not on his brief service as a private in the Black Hawk War. McClernand eventually resigned his Congressional seat effective October 28, 1861. He was an effective recruiter of volunteers for the Union Army. He raised the McClernand Brigade from southern Illinois, an area of mixed sentiments with respect to preservation of the Union. The brigade was placed in the Western Department which was under the command of Major General John C. Fremont on August 21, 1861. At the same time, the brigade was placed in the District of Southeast Missouri commanded by Brigadier General Ulysses S. Grant, a subordinate of Fremont. In the summer of 1861, McClernand commanded and trained his brigade at Springfield, Illinois and Jacksonville, Illinois, moving them to Cairo, Illinois at the beginning of September. The brigade soon began to cut off shipments of arms and supplies to the Confederacy.

=== Battle of Belmont ===
McClernand was second in command under Ulysses S. Grant at the Battle of Belmont in Missouri on November 7, 1861. In response to orders from Fremont on November 2 and 3, 1861, Grant sent regiments from his district in seven columns to demonstrate against Confederate forces on both sides of the Mississippi River. The objective was to prevent Confederate reinforcement of other Confederate units in Missouri and Arkansas. On the afternoon of November 6, two brigades under Grant's direct command moved down the river. One was commanded by McClernand; the other by Colonel Henry Dougherty. Grant picked up two regiments before stopping overnight, bringing his force to 3,119 men. His plan was to launch a surprise attack on the Confederate camp at Belmont, Missouri with part of his force while other regiments from his command were moving to attack the Confederates under Brigadier General M. Jeff Thompson, then at Bloomfield, Missouri and to reinforce Union Colonel Richard Oglesby operating in southeastern Missouri.

Near 8:00 a.m. on November 7, Grant's force began to disembark from transports about three and one-half miles (5.6 km) north of Belmont, out of range of Confederate artillery batteries across the river at Columbus, Kentucky. Union gunboats made futile attempts to attack Confederate artillery batteries during the landings. The Confederate camp at Belmont, named Camp Johnston, had been established by Confederate Major General Leonidas Polk as an observation post. When Polk learned of Grant's movement early on November 7, he sent four regiments under Brigadier General Gideon Pillow from Columbus to Belmont as reinforcements to intercept Grant's force.

After his troops had disembarked from the gunboats, McClernand led his brigade toward the Confederate line formed in part by the recently arrived regiments of Gideon Pillow, about 3,000 men in total. By 10:00 a.m., McClernand's skirmishers began to encounter the Confederate skirmishers. McClernand extended his battle line to outflank the Confederate line. A gap in the Union line was covered by two regiments shifting to the right. When McClernand saw that one of his regiments under Colonel Napoleon Buford had outflanked the Confederate line, McClernand ordered a general attack. Some Confederate battalions began to run out of ammunition. By 2:00 p.m. the Union battle line broke the Confederate battle line about one mile (1.6 km) from the Confederate camp.

After the Confederate soldiers fled in panic beyond the camp, the Union soldiers took the camp and as their discipline began to break down, they began a disorderly celebration and plundering. McClernand walked to the center of the camp and called for three cheers adding to the disorder at the scene. Grant had to order the camp burned to stop the plundering and restore order to the troops. At Columbus, Polk got word of the battle and first sent reinforcements, then crossed the river himself with more reinforcements. After about one-half hour of unopposed disorder at the camp, the Confederate reinforcements along with reformed elements of Pillow's regiments routed the Union force, sending them retreating toward their gunboats, which provided covering fire. McClernand had directed artillery placement which also facilitated the Union force's retreat. During the withdrawal McClernand suffered a grazing head wound. When reaching the shore, McClernand acted promptly to cover the boarding of the gunboats and to rescue a Union regiment which had been left behind. The Union troops, including Grant as the last to board a boat, narrowly escaped.

=== Battle of Fort Donelson ===
McClernand commanded the 1st Division of Grant's army at Fort Donelson. On the night of February 14, 1862, Confederate commanders decided to break out of the Union Army encirclement of the fort achieved the previous day. McClernand's division, whose flank was not sufficiently covered, was struck by a surprise attack in the early morning on February 15, 1862, the third day of the battle, in bitterly cold weather. By 7:00 a.m., the Confederates in line of battle and covered by artillery attacked McClernand's position, which McClernand thought he would still have time to adjust without Confederate movement in the frigid weather. Within an hour of the Confederate attack, the Confederates had cleared Union cavalry from their front and outflanked Colonel John McArthur's poorly placed brigade. Low on ammunition and with the negative effect on the men of Colonel Michael Lawler's wounding, McArthur's men began to run from the field. A friendly fire incident contributed to further Union withdrawal and opened two roads for Confederate escape. Yet the Confederate close order tactics in moving forward, an effort to reduce a salient at a road junction and straggling slowed the Confederate advance. By 1:00 p.m. McClernand's division had been thoroughly routed. Without orders from Grant, Brigadier General Lew Wallace sent his brigades to a new position to block the Confederate exit. Grant then ordered Brigadier General Charles Ferguson Smith ("C.F. Smith") to take the fort after surmising it would now be lightly defended and the Confederates could be encircled. With such men from McClernand's brigade who could be rallied, Wallace moved to retake the lost ground. As night was falling, he had to stop the movement until morning which allowed McClernand's men to gradually return to their campsites. Overnight, the Confederate generals decided to surrender, although Colonel Nathan Bedford Forrest escaped with most of his cavalrymen and Generals Gideon Pillow and John B. Floyd fled by boat. On March 21, 1862, McClernand, who had boasted about and exaggerated the achievements of his division was promoted to major general of volunteers for his service at Fort Donelson.

=== Battle of Shiloh ===
At the Battle of Shiloh on April 6–7, 1862, McClernand commanded the First Division of the Army of the Tennessee. On April 5, 1862, McClernand responded to rumors and reports that the Confederates were preparing a surprise attack by sending out a cavalry party to scout but they did not go in the right direction or far enough in any event. In the early morning of April 6, 1862, the regiment of Brigadier General William T. Sherman's Fifth Division on the left flank, stationed about a quarter-mile south and east of Shiloh Church, began to give way under Confederate attack and the colonel's panic. McClernand had already begun to send troops forward to prevent Sherman's division from being outflanked. By 9:30 a.m., Sherman's division was being attacked by six Confederate brigades. After two hours of heavy fighting, Sherman's division fell back, despite some reinforcements from Brigadier General W. H. L. Wallace's Second Division. About 10:00 a.m., Sherman's and McClernand's divisions linked up in a new position. McClernand's division was organized but Sherman's men reached the new line only a few minutes before the Confederates. Sherman's and McClernand's divisions were pushed back through the "Hornet's Nest", but held a firm line at Pittsburgh Landing as night fell. With the help of reinforcements Grant routed the Confederates with a devastating counterattack on April 7.

=== Political maneuvering ===
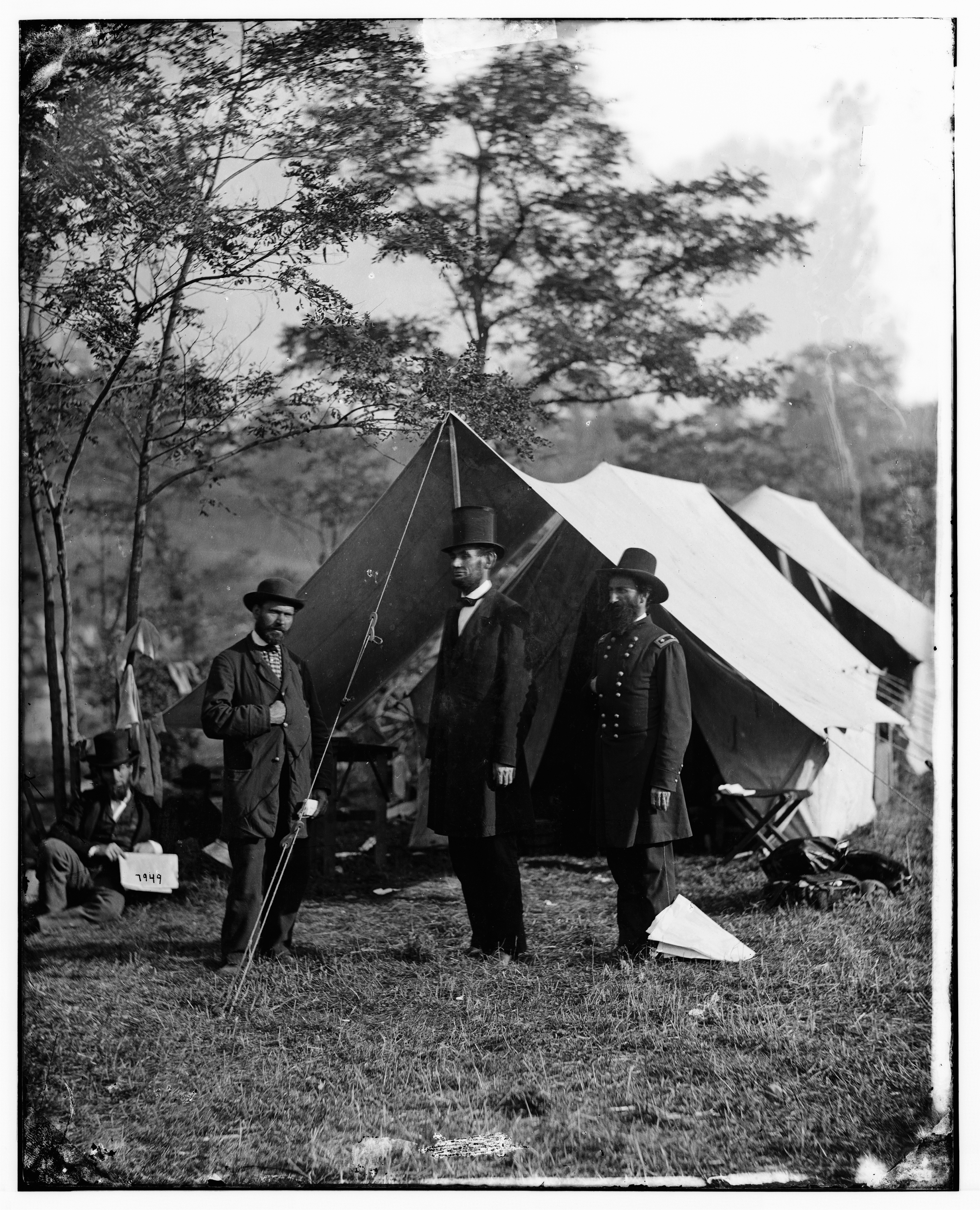
McClernand (right) with Abraham Lincoln during his inspection of the Antietam battlefield; Allan Pinkerton is standing at left.

McClernand's service as a major general was tainted by political maneuvering, which was resented by his colleagues. He communicated directly with his commander-in-chief, President Lincoln, offering his criticisms of the strategies of other generals, including Major General George B. McClellan's in the Eastern Theater and Grant's in the West.

In October 1862, McClernand used his political influence with Illinois Governor Richard Yates to obtain a leave of absence to visit Washington, D.C. and President Lincoln, hoping to receive an important independent command. Secretary of War Edwin Stanton agreed to order him north to raise troops for the expedition against Vicksburg which he would lead. With permission to attack Vicksburg granted, McClernand set for the west to raise troops, mostly from Illinois. As soon as his troops finished mustering and training, they were continuously dispatched for either Cairo or Memphis. Grant was anxious at this turn of events, fearing that McClernand might supersede him, so he wired Halleck. Halleck reassured Grant that this will not occur. Halleck and Grant then maneuvered McClernand into a disadvantageous position by drawing a large amount of the troops he had raised for his expedition into Grant's army. In December, McClernand wired Lincoln for clearance to go south and assume command of his force, now that he had raised a substantial force for the effort. The order did not come, but he soon received news of what was happening in Memphis. McClernand was outraged and quickly wired Lincoln and Stanton of what was happening, Stanton attempted to reassure him, and told him that Grant had received orders to reform the troops of the department into four army Corps, and that McClernand was going to command one of them. This was a setback and a downgrade from the earlier promised independent command. Orders were simultaneously dispatched from the war department to Grant ordering him to assign McClernand as Corps commander. Grant obliged and wired McClernand in December 18 that preparations were finished and his corps was ready to proceed and "form part of the expedition against Vicksburg". This wire was, by intention, delayed for several days, so that McClernand had received the communique when the expedition, under command of general Sherman, had already departed southwards and did not wait for McClernand. McClernand then proceeded to pursue the expeditionary force in order to assume his promised command; the force had contained the two army Corps, most of which he had raised by his effort, included his own corps and another corps that would fall under his command due to his seniority. McClernand's force under Sherman continued up the Mississippi river, racing to attack Vicksburg - under the assumption that the complete silence from Grant's force meant that he had plunged deeply into Mississippi. Sherman attempted to attack Vicksburg by attempting to storm nearly invincible Confederate positions at the Chickasaw Bayou & Bluffs, a short distance north of Vicksburg near the mouth of the Yazoo river. This attack was made on December 29 and was swiftly defeated, with Sherman's army suffering severe losses. The angry McClernand subsequently arrived and took command, issuing a proclamation that he would command all the troops in the expedition, and the force would be renamed to Army of the Mississippi.

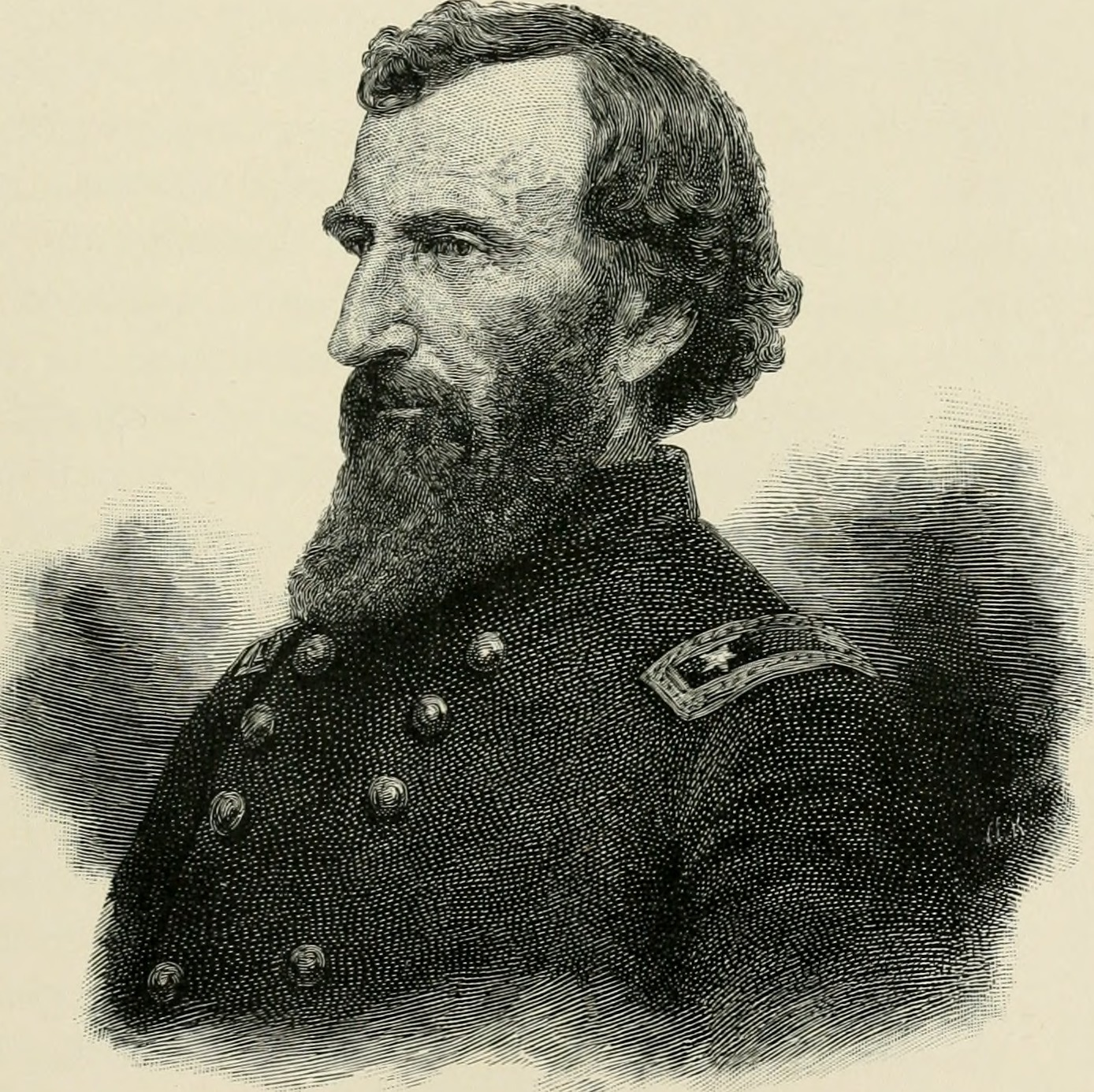

=== Battle of Milliken's Bend; Battle of Arkansas Post ===
Early in January 1863, at Milliken's Bend, McClernand caught up with the expedition and assumed command from Sherman as the leader of the Union force that was to move down the Mississippi as part of the Vicksburg campaign. McClernand renamed this force to the Army of the Mississippi, with the XIII and XV Corps being redesignated to the I and II Corps of the Army, respectively. At Sherman's suggestion, McClernand led an expedition up the Arkansas River to capture the Confederates' Fort Hindman at Arkansas Post, Arkansas The Battle of Fort Hindman, was fought from January 9 to 11, 1863, near the mouth of the Arkansas River. On January 11, 1863, and the fort was captured. Sherman and acting Rear Admiral David D. Porter later convinced a disapproving Grant that leaving the Confederate garrison at Arkansas Post in place could have been an obstacle to the capture of Vicksburg. Grant initially disapproved of this operation, and wired Halleck denouncing it as 'senseless'; but after news of victory came and learning that it was Sherman's idea, Grant quickly reversed his opinion, praising the operation in his telegraph to Halleck and calling it an 'essential step in the campaign against Vicksburg'.

=== Reduced to corps command; friction and intrigue ===
On January 17, Grant, after receiving the opinion of Admiral David Dixon Porter and General Sherman that McClernand was incompetent to lead further operations, united a part of his own troops with those of McClernand and assumed command in person and reduced McClernand to corps command. Three days later he ordered McClernand back to Milliken's Bend. During the rest of the Vicksburg Campaign there was much friction between McClernand and his colleagues. He intrigued for the removal of Grant, spreading rumors to the press of Grant drinking on the campaign.

=== Attempts to approach Vicksburg ===
McClernand landed his men on the Mississippi River levee at Young's Point, where they "suffered from the heavy winter rains and lack of shelter. Tents were not issued to the troops because they were within range of the [Confederate] guns at Vicksburg; so the more enterprising men dug holes in the levee and covered them with their black rubber blankets. Floundering in knee-deep black mud and still exhausted from recent expeditions, numerous soldiers fell sick. Many cases of smallpox were reported. Hospital tents lined the back side of the levee and were crowded with thousands of sick men. Many died, and soon the levee was lined with new graves."

=== Battle of Champion Hill; attack on Vicksburg; relief from command ===
It was Grant's opinion that at Champion Hill (May 16, 1863) McClernand was dilatory, but Grant bided his time, waiting for insubordination that was blatant enough to justify removing his politically powerful rival. After a bloody and unsuccessful assault against the Vicksburg entrenchments (ordered by Grant), McClernand wrote a congratulatory order to his corps, which also disparaged the efforts of the other corps. This was published in the press, contrary to an order of the department and another of Grant that official papers were not to be published. McClernand was relieved of his command on June 19, 1863, two weeks before the fall of Vicksburg, and was replaced by Major General Edward O. C. Ord. The duty of notifying him of his dismissal fell to Lieutenant Colonel James H. Wilson, who'd held a grudge against him for an earlier chastising. Once McClernand read the order, he exclaimed in shock "I am relieved!" Then seeing the look on Wilson's face, he made a joke out if it by saying "By God sir, we are both relieved!". Grant's order relieving him ordered him to go to any place in Illinois and contact the War Department for new orders.

=== Field command in Gulf; illness and resignation; Lincoln's funeral ===
President Lincoln, who saw the importance of conciliating a leader of the Illinois War Democrats, restored McClernand to a field command in 1864. On February 20, 1864, McClernand returned to his old XIII Corps, now part of the Department of the Gulf. Illness (malaria) limited his role. By the time the Red River Campaign commenced, McClernand had been replaced in command by Thomas E. G. Ransom. From April 27, 1864, through May 1, 1864, McClernand returned to the field to command the detachment of two divisions from the XIII Corps participating in the Red River Campaign. He resigned from the Army on November 30, 1864. McClernand rode on the funeral train of President Lincoln from Washington to Springfield Illinois, which departed from Washington on April 23, 1865, and arrived in Springfield on May 3, 1865. There were eight divisions in Lincoln's funeral procession on May 4, 1865. McClernand was at the front of the second division which preceded the hearse.

== Postbellum life ==
McClernand served as district judge of the Sangamon (Illinois) District from 1870 to 1873, and was chairman of the 1876 Democratic National Convention, which nominated Samuel J. Tilden for President of the United States. In 1871, at the 17th Annual Illinois State Fair, McClernand's colt, Zenith, won first place in the "Best Stallion Colt, 2 Years Old" category. The prize was $25.

McClernand's last public service was on a federal advisory commission overseeing the Utah Territory, beginning in 1886. The commissioners met in Utah about 170 days per year and McClernand returned home to Springfield when the commission was not in session. In 1887, the commission recommended that Utah not be admitted as a state until the Mormons had "abandoned polygamy in good faith." The Church of Jesus Christ of Latter-day Saints issued a proclamation renouncing polygamy in 1890, which McClernand stated he thought was sincere in an 1891 report but in 1892 the majority of the commission issued a report expressing doubt that the polygamy situation had changed. In April 1894, as a non-resident of Utah, McClernand was required by an 1893 law to resign from the Utah Commission. Utah was admitted to the Union on January 4, 1896, only after polygamy had been outlawed by the state constitution.

Despite his resignation from the Army in 1864, McClernand, no longer a wealthy man, was granted an Army pension in 1896, increased in 1900 to $100.00 per month, under acts of Congress.

Having been in ill health for several years, John McClernand died in Springfield, Illinois on September 20, 1900. He is interred there at Oak Ridge Cemetery.

== In popular culture ==
McClernand is the villain of MacKinlay Kantor’s alternate history book If the South Had Won the Civil War. In the alternate history presented, General Grant was killed accidentally at the start of the Vicksburg Campaign. McClernand then insisted upon assuming command and by thoroughly bad generalship managed to lose the campaign, get the Army of the Tennessee almost completely destroyed, and contribute significantly to the Union losing the entire war and the Confederacy gaining independence.

== See also ==
- List of American Civil War generals (Union)

Military offices
Preceded by William S. Rosecrans	Commander of the Army of the Mississippi; January 4, 1863–January 12, 1863	Succeeded by (none)
U.S. House of Representatives
Preceded by Zadok Casey	Member of the U.S. House of Representatives from Illinois's 2nd congressional district 1843–1851	Succeeded by Willis Allen
Preceded by Charles D. Hodges	Member of the U.S. House of Representatives from Illinois's 6th congressional district 1859–1861	Succeeded by Anthony L. Knapp
