= 35th United States Congress =

1857-1859 U.S. Congress

←	34th	36th	→
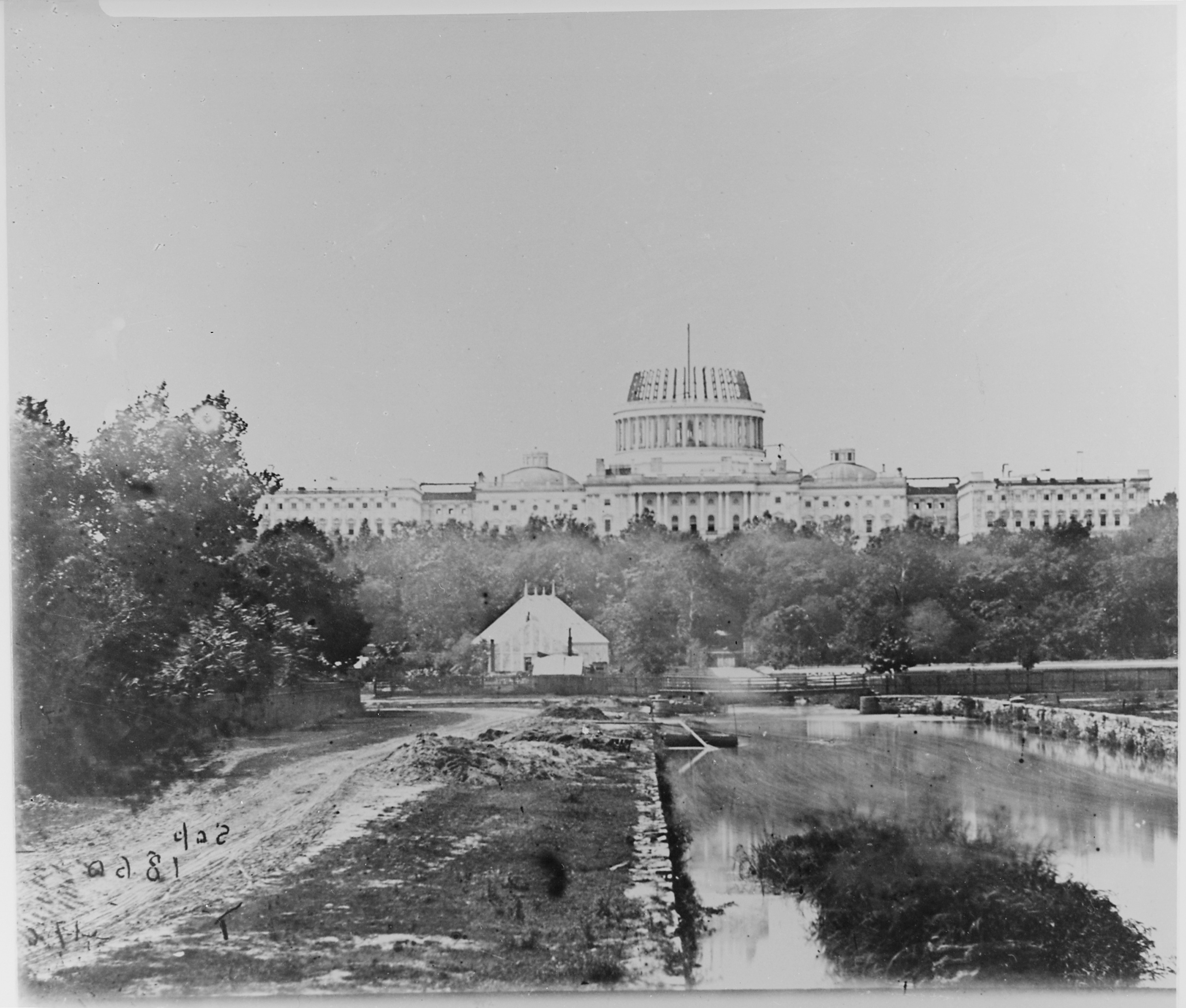
- United States Capitol (1860)

Overview
- Legislative body: United States Congress
- Jurisdiction: United States
- Term: March 4, 1857 – March 4, 1859

Senate
- Members: 66
- President: John C. Breckinridge (D)
- President pro tempore: James M. Mason (D); Thomas J. Rusk (D); Benjamin Fitzpatrick (D)
- Party control: Democratic

House of Representatives
- Members: 237 representatives 7 non-voting delegates
- Speaker: James L. Orr (D)
- Party control: Democratic

Sessions
- Special (Note: Special session of the Senate.): March 4, 1857 – March 14, 1857
- 1st: December 7, 1857 – June 14, 1858
- Special (Note: Special session of the Senate.): June 15, 1858 – June 16, 1858
- 2nd: December 6, 1858 – March 3, 1859

The 35th United States Congress was a meeting of the legislative branch of the United States federal government, consisting of the United States Senate and the United States House of Representatives. It met in Washington, D.C. from March 4, 1857, to March 4, 1859, during the first two years of James Buchanan's presidency. The apportionment of seats in the House of Representatives was based on the 1850 United States census. Both chambers had a Democratic majority.

== Major events ==
- Panic of 1857
- March 4, 1857. James Buchanan became President of the United States
- March 6, 1857: Dred Scott v. Sandford
- July 18, 1857: Utah Expedition left Fort Leavenworth, effectively beginning the Utah War
- February 6, 1858: Brawl on the floor of the House involving 50 or more representatives during the debates over the admission of Kansas as free or slave
- August 21, 1858: First of the Lincoln-Douglas debates was held
- March 3, 1859: Financial appropriations for the improvement and construction of lighthouses.

== Major legislation ==
- Tariff of 1857

== Treaties ==
- March 12, 1858: Treaty with the Ponca signed
- April 19, 1858: Treaty with the Yankton Sioux signed
- July 29, 1858: Harris Treaty signed with Japan

== States admitted ==
- May 11, 1858: Minnesota admitted as the 32nd state
- February 14, 1859: Oregon admitted as the 33rd state

== Party summary ==
=== Senate ===
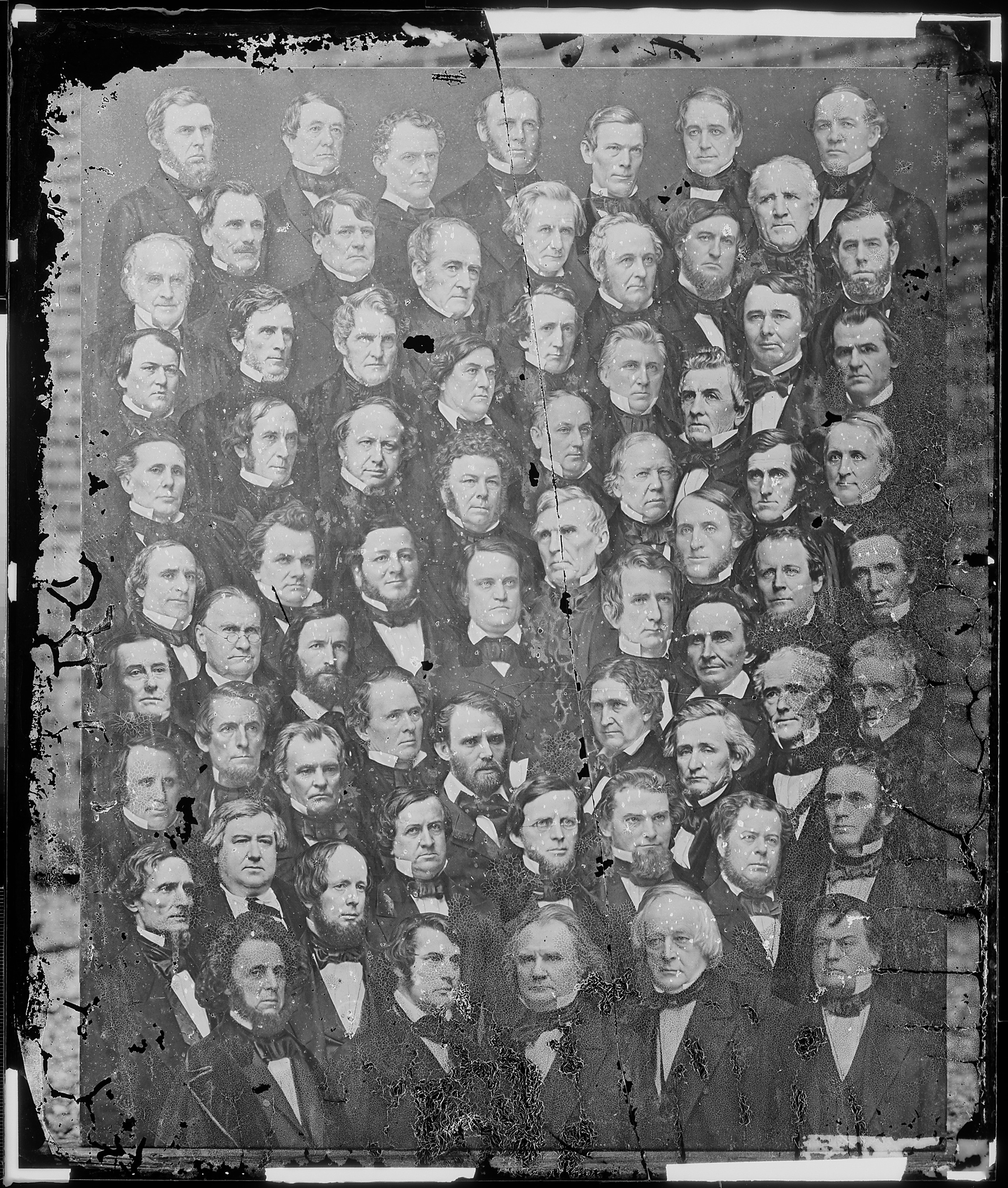
Group photo of the U.S. Senate, in 1859, during this Congress.

During this congress, two Senate seats were added for each of the new states of Minnesota and Oregon.

	Party (shading shows control)			Total	Vacant
	Know Nothing (A)	Democratic (D)	Republican (R)	Total	Vacant
End of previous congress	2	40	20 (Note: Opposition)	62	0
Begin	4	37	20	61	1
End	4	42	20	66	0
Final voting share	6.1%	63.6%	30.3%		
Beginning of next congress	2	38	26	66	0

=== House of Representatives ===
During this congress, two House seats were added for the new state of Minnesota and one House seat was added for the new state of Oregon.

	Party (shading shows control)					Total	Vacant
	Know Nothing (A)	Democratic (D)	Independent Democratic (ID)	Republican (R)	Other	Total	Vacant
End of previous congress	52	81	0	97 (Note: Opposition)	0	230	4
Begin	14	127	0	92	0	233	1
End	14	130	1	92	0	237	0
Final voting share	5.9%	54.9%	0.4%	38.8%	0.0%		
Beginning of next congress	6	84	7	113	25	235	2

== Leadership ==
=== Senate ===
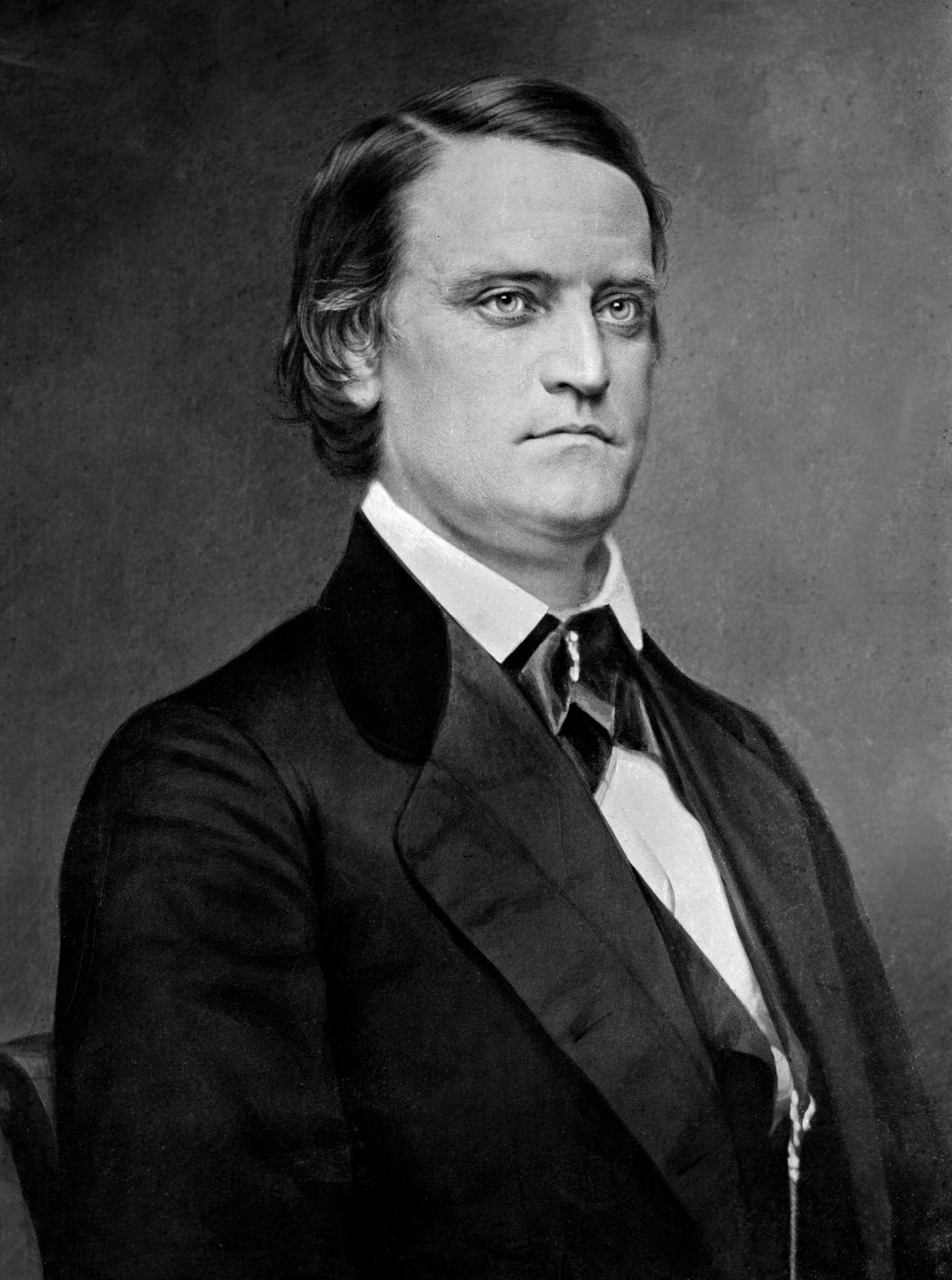
President of the Senate John C. Breckinridge

- President: John C. Breckinridge (D)
- President pro tempore: James M. Mason (D), March 4, 1857, only
  - Thomas J. Rusk (D), elected March 14, 1857
  - Benjamin Fitzpatrick (D), elected December 7, 1857

=== House of Representatives ===
- Speaker: James L. Orr (D)

== Members ==
This list is arranged by chamber, then by state. Senators are listed in order of seniority, and representatives are listed by district.

=== Senate ===
Senators were elected by the state legislatures every two years, with one-third beginning new six-year terms with each Congress. Preceding the names in the list below are Senate class numbers, which indicate the cycle of their election. In this Congress, Class 1 meant their term began with this Congress, facing re-election in 1862; Class 2 meant their term ended with this Congress, facing re-election in 1858; and Class 3 meant their term began in the last Congress, facing re-election in 1860.

==== Alabama ====
▌3. Benjamin Fitzpatrick (D)
▌2. Clement C. Clay Jr. (D)

==== Arkansas ====
▌2. William K. Sebastian (D)
▌3. Robert W. Johnson (D)

==== California ====
▌1. David C. Broderick (D)
▌3. William M. Gwin (D)

==== Connecticut ====
▌1. James Dixon (R)
▌3. Lafayette S. Foster (R)

==== Delaware ====
▌1. James A. Bayard Jr. (D)
▌2. Martin W. Bates (D)

==== Florida ====
▌1. Stephen Mallory (D)
▌3. David Levy Yulee (D)

==== Georgia ====
▌2. Robert Toombs (D)
▌3. Alfred Iverson Sr. (D)

==== Illinois ====
▌2. Stephen A. Douglas (D)
▌3. Lyman Trumbull (R)

==== Indiana ====
▌1. Jesse D. Bright (D)
▌3. Graham N. Fitch (D)

==== Iowa ====
▌2. George Wallace Jones (D)
▌3. James Harlan (R)

==== Kentucky ====
▌2. John B. Thompson (A)
▌3. John J. Crittenden (A)

==== Louisiana ====
▌2. Judah P. Benjamin (D)
▌3. John Slidell (D)

==== Maine ====
▌1. Hannibal Hamlin (R)
▌2. William Pitt Fessenden (R)

==== Maryland ====
▌1. Anthony Kennedy (A)
▌3. James A. Pearce (D)

==== Massachusetts ====
▌1. Charles Sumner (R)
▌2. Henry Wilson (R)

==== Michigan ====
▌1. Zachariah Chandler (R)
▌2. Charles E. Stuart (D)

==== Minnesota ====
▌1. Henry M. Rice (D), from May 11, 1858 (newly admitted state)
▌2. James Shields (D), from May 11, 1858 (newly admitted state)

==== Mississippi ====
▌1. Jefferson Davis (D)
▌2. Albert G. Brown (D)

==== Missouri ====
▌1. Trusten Polk (D)
▌3. James S. Green (D)

==== New Hampshire ====
▌2. John P. Hale (R)
▌3. James Bell (R), until May 26, 1857

▌Daniel Clark (R), from June 27, 1857

==== New Jersey ====
▌1. John R. Thomson (D)
▌2. William Wright (D)

==== New York ====
▌1. Preston King (R)
▌3. William H. Seward (R)

==== North Carolina ====
▌2. David S. Reid (D)
▌3. Asa Biggs (D), until May 5, 1858

▌Thomas L. Clingman (D), from May 7, 1858

==== Ohio ====
▌1. Benjamin Wade (R)
▌3. George E. Pugh (D)

==== Oregon ====
▌2. Delazon Smith (D), from February 14, 1859 (newly admitted state)
▌3. Joseph Lane (D), from February 14, 1859 (newly admitted state)

==== Pennsylvania ====
▌1. Simon Cameron (R)
▌3. William Bigler (D)

==== Rhode Island ====
▌1. James F. Simmons (R)
▌2. Philip Allen (D)

==== South Carolina ====
▌2. Josiah J. Evans (D), until May 6, 1858

▌Arthur P. Hayne (D), from May 11, 1858, until December 2, 1858
▌James Chesnut Jr. (D), from December 3, 1858

▌3. Andrew Butler (D), until May 25, 1857

▌James H. Hammond (D), from December 7, 1857

==== Tennessee ====
▌1. Andrew Johnson (D), from October 8, 1857
▌2. John Bell (A)

==== Texas ====
▌1. Thomas J. Rusk (D), until July 29, 1857

▌J. Pinckney Henderson (D), November 9, 1857 - June 4, 1858
▌Matthias Ward (D), from September 27, 1858

▌2. Samuel Houston (D)

==== Vermont ====
▌1. Solomon Foot (R)
▌3. Jacob Collamer (R)

==== Virginia ====
▌1. James M. Mason (D)
▌2. Robert M. T. Hunter (D)

==== Wisconsin ====
▌1. James R. Doolittle (R)
▌3. Charles Durkee (R)

Senators' party membership by state at the opening of the 35th Congress in March 1857. The green stripes represent Know-Nothings. The senators from Minnesota and Oregon were not seated until later in the Congress. 2 Democrats 1 Democrat and 1 Republican 2 Republicans 2 Know-Nothings

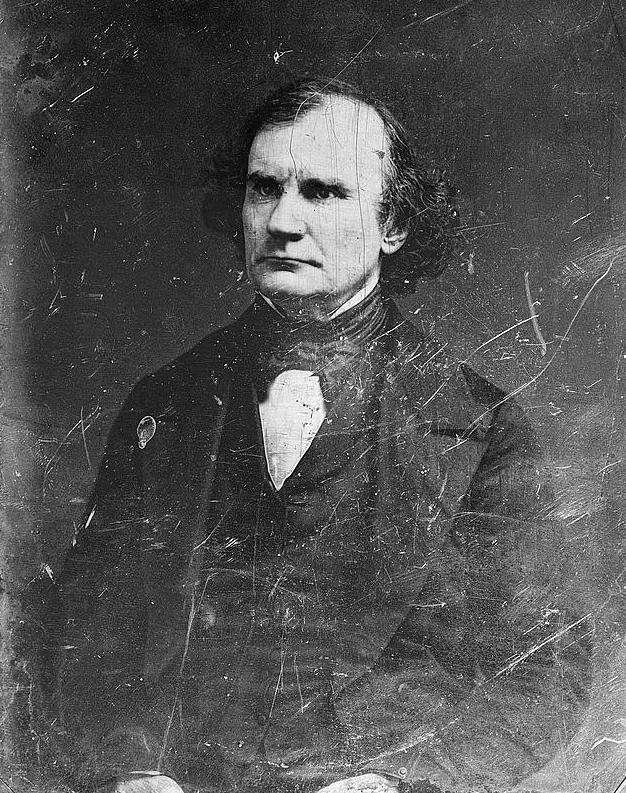
Senate President pro tempore James Murray Mason, March 4, 1857

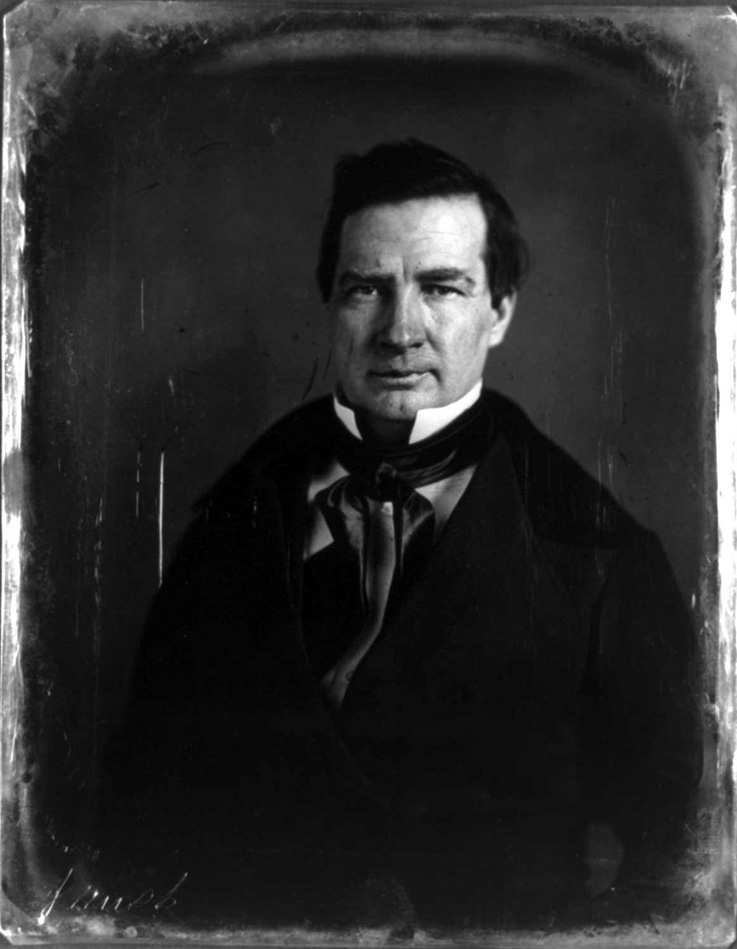
Senate President pro tempore Thomas J. Rusk, March 14, 1857 – July 29, 1857

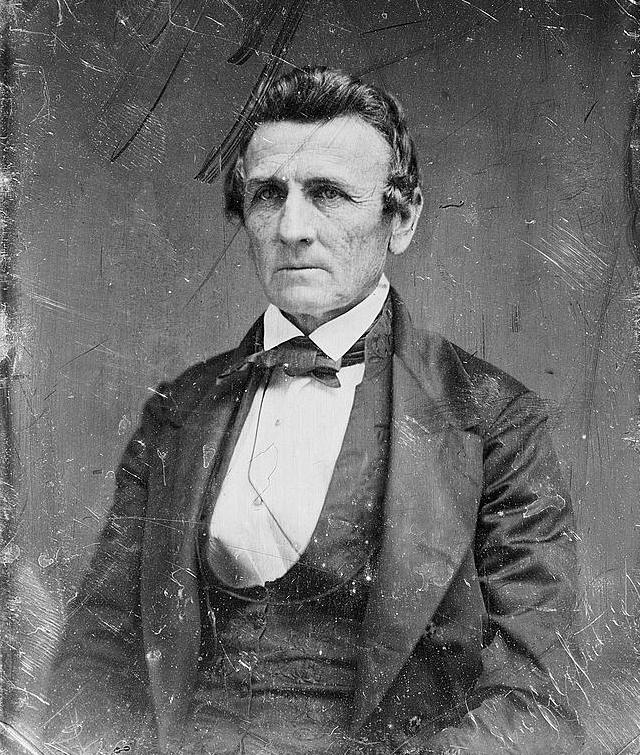
Senate President pro tempore Benjamin Fitzpatrick, from December 7, 1857

=== House of Representatives ===
The names of representatives are preceded by their district numbers.

==== Alabama ====
▌1. James A. Stallworth (D)
▌2. Eli S. Shorter (D)
▌3. James F. Dowdell (D)
▌4. Sydenham Moore (D)
▌5. George S. Houston (D)
▌6. Williamson R. W. Cobb (D)
▌7. Jabez L. M. Curry (D)

==== Arkansas ====
▌1. Alfred B. Greenwood (D)
▌2. Edward A. Warren (D)

==== California ====
▌At-large. (Note: United States representatives were elected statewide on a general ticket.) Joseph C. McKibbin (D)
▌At-large. Charles L. Scott (D)

==== Connecticut ====
▌1. Ezra Clark Jr. (R)
▌2. Samuel Arnold (D)
▌3. Sidney Dean (R)
▌4. William D. Bishop (D)

==== Delaware ====
▌At-large. William G. Whiteley (D)

==== Florida ====
▌At-large. George S. Hawkins (D)

==== Georgia ====
▌1. James L. Seward (D)
▌2. Martin J. Crawford (D)
▌3. Robert P. Trippe (A)
▌4. Lucius J. Gartrell (D)
▌5. Augustus R. Wright (D)
▌6. James Jackson (D)
▌7. Joshua Hill (A)
▌8. Alexander H. Stephens (D)

==== Illinois ====
▌1. Elihu B. Washburne (R)
▌2. John F. Farnsworth (R)
▌3. Owen Lovejoy (R)
▌4. William Kellogg (R)
▌5. Isaac N. Morris (D)
▌6. Thomas L. Harris (D), until November 24, 1858

▌Charles D. Hodges (D), from January 4, 1859

▌7. Aaron Shaw (D)
▌8. Robert Smith (D)
▌9. Samuel S. Marshall (D)

==== Indiana ====
▌1. James Lockhart (D), until September 7, 1857

▌William E. Niblack (D), from December 7, 1857

▌2. William H. English (D)
▌3. James Hughes (D)
▌4. James B. Foley (D)
▌5. David Kilgore (R)
▌6. James M. Gregg (D)
▌7. John G. Davis (D)
▌8. James Wilson (R)
▌9. Schuyler Colfax (R)
▌10. Samuel Brenton (R), until March 29, 1857

▌Charles Case (R), from December 7, 1857

▌11. John U. Pettit (R)

==== Iowa ====
▌1. Samuel Curtis (R)
▌2. Timothy Davis (R)

==== Kentucky ====
▌1. Henry C. Burnett (D)
▌2. Samuel O. Peyton (D)
▌3. Warner L. Underwood (A)
▌4. Albert G. Talbott (D)
▌5. Joshua Jewett (D)
▌6. John M. Elliott (D)
▌7. Humphrey Marshall (A)
▌8. James B. Clay (D)
▌9. John C. Mason (D)
▌10. John W. Stevenson (D)

==== Louisiana ====
▌1. George Eustis Jr. (A)
▌2. Miles Taylor (D)
▌3. Thomas G. Davidson (D)
▌4. John M. Sandidge (D)

==== Maine ====
▌1. John M. Wood (R)
▌2. Charles J. Gilman (R)
▌3. Nehemiah Abbott (R)
▌4. Freeman H. Morse (R)
▌5. Israel Washburn Jr. (R)
▌6. Stephen C. Foster (R)

==== Maryland ====
▌1. James A. Stewart (D)
▌2. James B. Ricaud (A)
▌3. J. Morrison Harris (A)
▌4. Henry Winter Davis (A)
▌5. Jacob M. Kunkel (D)
▌6. Thomas F. Bowie (D)

==== Massachusetts ====
▌1. Robert B. Hall (R)
▌2. James Buffington (R)
▌3. William S. Damrell (R)
▌4. Linus B. Comins (R)
▌5. Anson Burlingame (R)
▌6. Timothy Davis (R)
▌7. Nathaniel P. Banks (R), until December 24, 1857

▌Daniel W. Gooch (R), from January 31, 1858

▌8. Chauncey L. Knapp (R)
▌9. Eli Thayer (R)
▌10. Calvin C. Chaffee (R)
▌11. Henry L. Dawes (R)

==== Michigan ====
▌1. William A. Howard (R)
▌2. Henry Waldron (R)
▌3. David S. Walbridge (R)
▌4. De Witt C. Leach (R)

==== Minnesota ====
▌At-large. James M. Cavanaugh (D), from May 11, 1858 (newly admitted state)
▌At-large. William W. Phelps (D), from May 11, 1858 (newly admitted state)

==== Mississippi ====
▌1. Lucius Q. C. Lamar (D)
▌2. Reuben Davis (D)
▌3. William Barksdale (D)
▌4. Otho R. Singleton (D)
▌5. John A. Quitman (D), until July 17, 1858

▌John J. McRae (D), from December 7, 1858

==== Missouri ====
▌1. Francis P. Blair Jr. (R)
▌2. Thomas L. Anderson (A)
▌3. John B. Clark (D), from December 7, 1857
▌4. James Craig (D)
▌5. Samuel H. Woodson (A)
▌6. John S. Phelps (D)
▌7. Samuel Caruthers (D)

==== New Hampshire ====
▌1. James Pike (R)
▌2. Mason Tappan (R)
▌3. Aaron H. Cragin (R)

==== New Jersey ====
▌1. Isaiah D. Clawson (R)
▌2. George R. Robbins (R)
▌3. Garnett Adrain (D)
▌4. John Huyler (D)
▌5. Jacob R. Wortendyke (D)

==== New York ====
▌1. John A. Searing (D)
▌2. George Taylor (D)
▌3. Daniel Sickles (D)
▌4. John Kelly (D), until December 25, 1858

▌Thomas J. Barr (ID), from January 7, 1859

▌5. William B. Maclay (D)
▌6. John Cochrane (D)
▌7. Elijah Ward (D)
▌8. Horace F. Clark (D)
▌9. John B. Haskin (D)
▌10. Ambrose S. Murray (R)
▌11. William F. Russell (D)
▌12. John Thompson (R)
▌13. Abram B. Olin (R)
▌14. Erastus Corning (D)
▌15. Edward Dodd (R)
▌16. George W. Palmer (R)
▌17. Francis E. Spinner (R)
▌18. Clark B. Cochrane (R)
▌19. Oliver A. Morse (R)
▌20. Orsamus B. Matteson (R)
▌21. Henry Bennett (R)
▌22. Henry C. Goodwin (R)
▌23. Charles B. Hoard (R)
▌24. Amos P. Granger (R)
▌25. Edwin B. Morgan (R)
▌26. Emory B. Pottle (R)
▌27. John M. Parker (R)
▌28. William H. Kelsey (R)
▌29. Samuel G. Andrews (R)
▌30. Judson W. Sherman (R)
▌31. Silas M. Burroughs (R)
▌32. Israel T. Hatch (D)
▌33. Reuben Fenton (R)

==== North Carolina ====
▌1. Henry M. Shaw (D)
▌2. Thomas H. Ruffin (D)
▌3. Warren Winslow (D)
▌4. Lawrence O'Bryan Branch (D)
▌5. John A. Gilmer (A)
▌6. Alfred M. Scales (D)
▌7. F. Burton Craige (D)
▌8. Thomas L. Clingman (D), until May 7, 1858

▌Zebulon B. Vance (D), from December 7, 1858

==== Ohio ====
▌1. George H. Pendleton (D)
▌2. William S. Groesbeck (D)
▌3. Lewis D. Campbell (R), until May 25, 1858

▌Clement Vallandigham (D), from May 25, 1858

▌4. Matthias H. Nichols (R)
▌5. Richard Mott (R)
▌6. Joseph R. Cockerill (D)
▌7. Aaron Harlan (R)
▌8. Benjamin Stanton (R)
▌9. Lawrence W. Hall (D)
▌10. Joseph Miller (D)
▌11. Valentine B. Horton (R)
▌12. Samuel S. Cox (D)
▌13. John Sherman (R)
▌14. Philemon Bliss (R)
▌15. Joseph Burns (D)
▌16. Cydnor B. Tompkins (R)
▌17. William Lawrence (D)
▌18. Benjamin F. Leiter (R)
▌19. Edward Wade (R)
▌20. Joshua R. Giddings (R)
▌21. John Bingham (R)

==== Oregon ====
▌At-large. La Fayette Grover (D), from February 14, 1859 (newly admitted state)

==== Pennsylvania ====
▌1. Thomas B. Florence (D)
▌2. Edward Joy Morris (R)
▌3. James Landy (D)
▌4. Henry M. Phillips (D)
▌5. Owen Jones (D)
▌6. John Hickman (D)
▌7. Henry Chapman (D)
▌8. J. Glancey Jones (D), until October 30, 1858

▌William H. Keim (R), from December 7, 1858

▌9. Anthony E. Roberts (R)
▌10. John C. Kunkel (R)
▌11. William L. Dewart (D)
▌12. John G. Montgomery (D), until April 24, 1857

▌Paul Leidy (D), from December 7, 1857

▌13. William H. Dimmick (D)
▌14. Galusha A. Grow (R)
▌15. Allison White (D)
▌16. John A. Ahl (D)
▌17. Wilson Reilly (D)
▌18. John R. Edie (R)
▌19. John Covode (R)
▌20. William Montgomery (D)
▌21. David Ritchie (R)
▌22. Samuel A. Purviance (R)
▌23. William Stewart (R)
▌24. James L. Gillis (D)
▌25. John Dick (R)

==== Rhode Island ====
▌1. Nathaniel B. Durfee (R)
▌2. William D. Brayton (R)

==== South Carolina ====
▌1. John McQueen (D)
▌2. William P. Miles (D)
▌3. Laurence M. Keitt (D)
▌4. Milledge L. Bonham (D)
▌5. James L. Orr (D)
▌6. William W. Boyce (D)

==== Tennessee ====
▌1. Albert G. Watkins (D)
▌2. Horace Maynard (A)
▌3. Samuel A. Smith (D)
▌4. John H. Savage (D)
▌5. Charles Ready (A)
▌6. George W. Jones (D)
▌7. John V. Wright (D)
▌8. Felix K. Zollicoffer (A)
▌9. John D. C. Atkins (D)
▌10. William T. Avery (D)

==== Texas ====
▌1. John H. Reagan (D)
▌2. Guy M. Bryan (D)

==== Vermont ====
▌1. Eliakim P. Walton (R)
▌2. Justin S. Morrill (R)
▌3. Homer E. Royce (R)

==== Virginia ====
▌1. Muscoe R. H. Garnett (D)
▌2. John S. Millson (D)
▌3. John Caskie (D)
▌4. William Goode (D)
▌5. Thomas S. Bocock (D)
▌6. Paulus Powell (D)
▌7. William Smith (D)
▌8. Charles J. Faulkner Sr. (D)
▌9. John Letcher (D)
▌10. Sherrard Clemens (D)
▌11. Albert G. Jenkins (D)
▌12. Henry A. Edmundson (D)
▌13. George W. Hopkins (D)

==== Wisconsin ====
▌1. John F. Potter (R)
▌2. Cadwallader C. Washburn (R)
▌3. Charles Billinghurst (R)

==== Non-voting members ====
▌Kansas Territory. Marcus J. Parrott (R)
▌Minnesota Territory. William W. Kingsbury (D), until May 11, 1858
▌Nebraska Territory. Fenner Ferguson (D)
▌New Mexico Territory. Miguel A. Otero (D)
▌Oregon Territory. Joseph Lane (D), until February 14, 1859
Utah Territory. John M. Bernhisel
▌Washington Territory. Isaac Stevens (D)

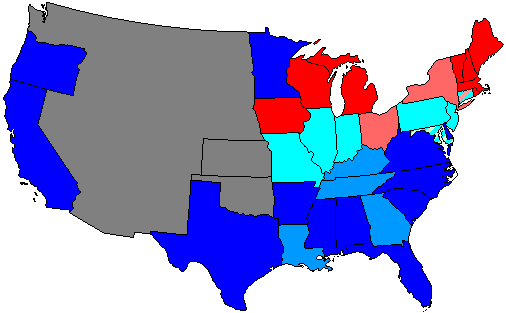
House seats by party holding plurality in state: 80.1-100% Democratic / 80.1-100% Republican; 60.1-80% Democratic / 60.1-80% Republican; Up to 60% Democratic / Up to 60% Republican

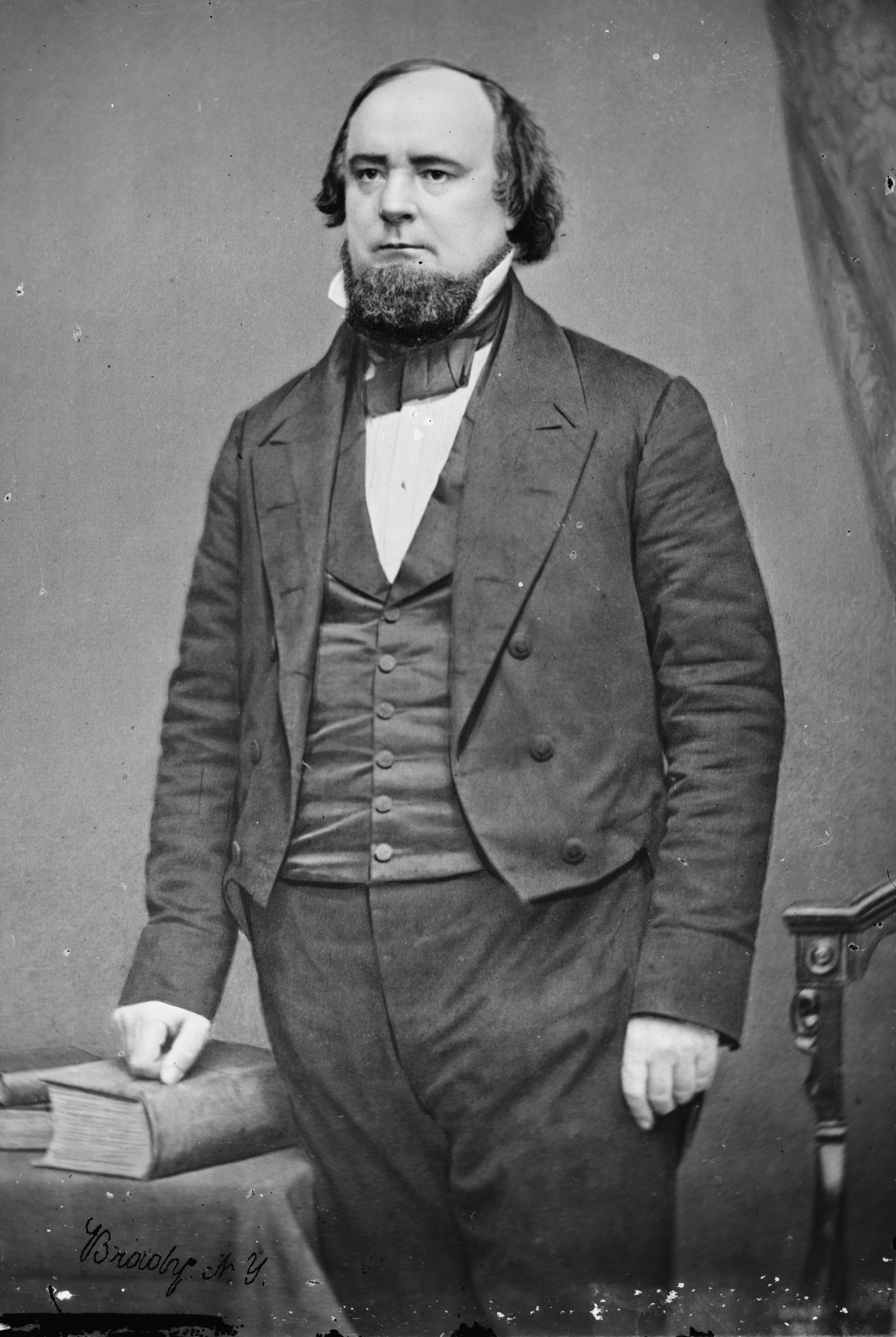
House Speaker James L. Orr

== Changes in membership ==
The count below reflects changes from the beginning of the first session of this Congress.

=== Senate ===
- Replacements: 5
  - Democrats (D): no net change
  - Whigs (W): no net change
  - Republicans (R): no net change
  - Americans (A): no net change
- Deaths: 4
- Resignations: 1
- Interim appointments: 2
- Seats of newly admitted states: 4
- Total seats with changes: 9

Senate changes
State (class)	Vacated by	Reason for change	Successor	Date of successor's formal installation (Note: When seated or oath administered, not necessarily when service began.)
Tennessee (1)	Vacant	Legislature had failed to elect. Successor elected October 8, 1857.	Andrew Johnson (D)	October 8, 1857
South Carolina (3)	Andrew Butler (D)	Died May 25, 1857. Successor elected December 7, 1857.	James H. Hammond (D)	December 7, 1857
New Hampshire (3)	James Bell (R)	Died May 26, 1857. Successor elected June 27, 1857.	Daniel Clark (R)	June 27, 1857
Texas (1)	Thomas J. Rusk (D)	Died July 29, 1857. Successor appointed November 9, 1857.	J. Pinckney Henderson (D)	November 9, 1857
North Carolina (3)	Asa Biggs (D)	Resigned May 5, 1858, to become judge of the U.S. District Court for the District of North Carolina. Successor appointed May 7, 1858. Appointee elected November 23, 1858.	Thomas L. Clingman (D)	May 7, 1858
South Carolina (2)	Josiah J. Evans (D)	Died May 6, 1858. Successor appointed May 11, 1858.	Arthur P. Hayne (D)	May 11, 1858
Minnesota (1)	New seat	Minnesota admitted to the Union May 11, 1858, and its first Senators were elected that day.	Henry M. Rice (D)	May 11, 1858
Minnesota (2)	New seat	Minnesota admitted to the Union May 11, 1858, and its first Senators were elected that day.	James Shields (D)	May 11, 1858
Texas (1)	J. Pinckney Henderson (D)	Died June 4, 1858. Successor appointed September 27, 1858.	Matthias Ward (D)	September 27, 1858
South Carolina (2)	Arthur P. Hayne (D)	Interim appointee retired. Successor elected December 2, 1858.	James Chesnut Jr. (D)	December 3, 1858
Oregon (2)	New seat	Oregon admitted to the Union February 14, 1859, and its first Senators were elected that day.	Delazon Smith (D)	February 14, 1859
Oregon (3)	New seat	Oregon admitted to the Union February 14, 1859, and its first Senators were elected that day.	Joseph Lane (D)	February 14, 1859

=== House of Representatives ===
- Replacements: 10
  - Democrats (D): 3 seat net loss
  - Whigs (W): 3 seat net gain
  - Republicans (R): 1 seat net gain
  - Independent Democrats (ID): 1 seat net gain
- Deaths: 5
- Resignations: 6
- Contested election:1
- Seats of newly admitted states: 3
- Total seats with changes: 14

House changes
District	Vacated by	Reason for change	Successor	Date of successor's formal installation
Missouri 3rd	Vacant	Rep. James S. Green was elected to this term but resigned after being elected in turn to the US Senate	John B. Clark (D)	Seated December 7, 1857
Indiana 10th	Samuel Brenton (R)	Died March 29, 1857	Charles Case (R)	Seated December 7, 1857
Pennsylvania 12th	John G. Montgomery (D)	Died April 24, 1857	Paul Leidy (D)	Seated December 7, 1857
Indiana 1st	James Lockhart (D)	Died September 7, 1857	William E. Niblack (D)	Seated December 7, 1857
Massachusetts 7th	Nathaniel P. Banks (R)	Resigned December 24, 1857, after being elected Governor of Massachusetts	Daniel W. Gooch (R)	Seated January 31, 1858
North Carolina 8th	Thomas L. Clingman (D)	Resigned May 7, 1858, after being appointed to the US Senate	Zebulon B. Vance (D)	Seated December 7, 1858
Minnesota At-Large	New seat	Minnesota was admitted to the Union May 11, 1858	James M. Cavanaugh (D)	Seated May 11, 1858
Minnesota Territory At-Large	William W. Kingsbury (D)	Minnesota was admitted to the Union May 11, 1858	Seat eliminated	
Minnesota At-Large	New seat	Minnesota was admitted to the Union May 11, 1858	William W. Phelps (D)	Seated May 11, 1858
Ohio 3rd	Lewis D. Campbell (R)	Lost contested election May 25, 1858	Clement Vallandigham (D)	Seated May 25, 1858
Mississippi 5th	John A. Quitman (D)	Died July 17, 1858	John J. McRae (D)	Seated December 7, 1858
Pennsylvania 8th	J. Glancy Jones (D)	Resigned October 30, 1858	William H. Keim (R)	Seated December 7, 1858
Illinois 6th	Thomas L. Harris (D)	Died November 24, 1858	Charles D. Hodges (D)	Seated January 4, 1859
New York 4th	John Kelly (D)	Resigned December 25, 1858	Thomas J. Barr (D)	Seated January 7, 1859
Oregon Territory At-Large	Joseph Lane (D)	Oregon was admitted to the Union February 14, 1859	Seat eliminated	
Oregon At-Large	New seat	Oregon was admitted to the Union February 14, 1859	La Fayette Grover (D)	Seated February 14, 1859

== Committees ==
Lists of committees and their party leaders.

=== Senate ===
- Audit and Control the Contingent Expenses of the Senate (Chairman: Josiah J. Evans then William Wright)
- Banks of the District of Columbia (Select)
- Claims (Chairman: Alfred Iverson Sr.)
- Commerce (Chairman: Clement Claiborne Clay)
- Distributing Public Revenue Among the States (Select)
- District of Columbia (Chairman: Albert G. Brown)
- Engrossed Bills (Chairman: William Wright)
- Finance (Chairman: Robert M.T. Hunter)
- Foreign Relations (Chairman: James M. Mason)
- French Spoilations (Select)
- Indian Affairs (Chairman: William K. Sebastian)
- Judiciary (Chairman: James A. Bayard Jr.)
- Military Affairs (Chairman: Jefferson Davis)
- Military Asylum near Washington, D.C. (Select)
- Militia (Chairman: N/A)
- Naval Affairs (Chairman: Stephen Mallory)
- Ordnance and War Ships (Select)
- Pacific Railroad (Select)
- Patents and the Patent Office (Chairman: David S. Reid)
- Pensions (Chairman: George Wallace Jones)
- Post Office and Post Roads (Chairman: David Levy Yulee)
- Printing (Chairman: Robert W. Johnson)
- Private Land Claims (Chairman: Judah P. Benjamin)
- Public Buildings and Grounds (Chairman: Jesse D. Bright)
- Public Lands (Chairman: Charles E. Stuart)
- Retrenchment (Chairman: Stephen A. Douglas)
- Revolutionary Claims (Chairman: Josiah J. Evans)
- Tariff Regulation (Select)
- Territories (Chairman: N/A)
- Whole

=== House of Representatives ===
- Accounts (Chairman: John C. Mason)
- Agriculture (Chairman: William G. Whiteley)
- Claims (Chairman: Samuel S. Marshall)
- Commerce (Chairman: John Cochrane)
- District of Columbia (Chairman: William O. Goode)
- Elections (Chairman: Thomas L. Harris)
- Engraving (Chairman: Garnett B. Adrain)
- Expenditures in the Navy Department (Chairman: John B. Haskin)
- Expenditures in the Post Office Department (Chairman: Albert G. Talbott)
- Expenditures in the State Department (Chairman: Owen Jones)
- Expenditures in the Treasury Department (Chairman: William Lawrence)
- Expenditures in the War Department (Chairman: Wilson Reilly)
- Expenditures on Public Buildings (Chairman: Allison White)
- Foreign Affairs (Chairman: Thomas L. Clingman)
- Indian Affairs (Chairman: Alfred B. Greenwood)
- Invalid Pensions (Chairman: Joshua H. Jewett)
- Judiciary (Chairman: George S. Houston)
- Manufactures (Chairman: William D. Bishop)
- Mileage (Chairman: Robert Smith)
- Military Affairs (Chairman: John A. Quitman)
- Militia (Chairman: Israel T. Hatch)
- Naval Affairs (Chairman: Thomas S. Bocock)
- Patents (Chairman: James A. Stewart)
- Post Office and Post Roads (Chairman: William H. English)
- Private Land Claims (Chairman: John M. Sandidge)
- Public Buildings and Grounds (Chairman: Lawrence M. Keitt)
- Public Expenditures (Chairman: John M. Elliott)
- Public Lands (Chairman: Williamson R. W. Cobb)
- Revisal and Unfinished Business (Chairman: William L. Dewart)
- Revolutionary Claims (Chairman: Samuel S. Cox)
- Revolutionary Pensions (Chairman: John Hickman)
- Roads and Canals (Chairman: George W. Jones)
- Rules (Select)
- Standards of Official Conduct
- Territories (Chairman: Alexander H. Stephens)
- Ways and Means (Chairman: J. Glancy Jones then John S. Phelps)
- Whole

=== Joint committees ===
- Enrolled Bills (Chairman: Rep. Thomas G. Davidson)
- The Library (Chairman: Rep. William H. Dimmick)
- Printing (Chairman: Rep. Samuel A. Smith)

== Caucuses ==
- Democratic (House)
- Democratic (Senate)

== Employees ==
=== Legislative branch agency directors ===
- Architect of the Capitol. Thomas U. Walter
- Librarian of Congress: John Silva Meehan

=== Senate ===
- Chaplain. Stephen P. Hill (Baptist)
- Secretary. Asbury Dickins
- Sergeant at Arms. Dunning R. McNair

=== House of Representatives ===
- Chaplain: None
- Clerk: James C. Allen
- Doorkeeper: Robert B. Hackney, until May 17, 1858
  - Joseph L. Wright, elected May 18, 1858
- Messenger: Thaddeus Morrice
- Sergeant at Arms: Adam J. Glossbrenner
- Postmaster: Michael W. Cluskey

== See also ==
- 1856 United States elections (elections leading to this Congress)
  - 1856 United States presidential election
  - 1856–57 United States Senate elections
  - 1856–57 United States House of Representatives elections
- 1858 United States elections (elections during this Congress, leading to the next Congress)
  - 1858–59 United States Senate elections
  - 1858–59 United States House of Representatives elections
