= William W. Kingsbury =

American politician (1828–1892)

William Kingsbury

Delegate to the U.S. House of Representatives from the Minnesota Territory's at-large district
- In office March 4, 1857 – May 11, 1858
- Preceded by: Henry Rice
- Succeeded by: James M. Cavanaugh (Representative)

Personal details
- Born: William Wallace Kingsbury; June 4, 1828 Towanda, Pennsylvania, U.S.
- Died: April 17, 1892 (aged 63) Tarpon Springs, Florida, U.S.
- Party: Democratic

William Wallace Kingsbury (June 4, 1828 – April 17, 1892) was a delegate from the Territory of Minnesota.

== Education ==
Born in Towanda, Pennsylvania, he attended the academies at Towanda, and Athens, Pennsylvania. He clerked in a store, became a surveyor, and later moved to Endion, Minnesota (now Duluth) in 1852.

== Political life ==
He became a member of the Minnesota Territorial House of Representatives in 1857 and a delegate to the Minnesota State Constitutional Convention in 1857. Kingsbury was elected as a Democrat to the 35th congress and served from March 4, 1857, to May 11, 1858, when a portion of the Territory was admitted as a State into the Union. He was not a candidate for renomination in 1858 and later returned to Towanda in 1865 and engaged in the real estate and insurance business.

Kingsbury was engaged as a commission merchant in Baltimore, Maryland, for three years, after which he moved to Tarpon Springs, Florida, in 1887. He was involved in real estate and mercantile pursuits until his death there and was interred in Cycadia Cemetery.

== Legacy ==
Kingsbury Creek, in St. Louis County, Minnesota, was named after Kingsbury.

U.S. House of Representatives
Preceded by Henry Rice	Delegate to the U.S. House of Representatives from the Minnesota Territory's at-large congressional district 1857–1858	Succeeded by James M. Cavanaugh as U.S. Representative
