= Henry M. Rice =

American politician (1816–1894)

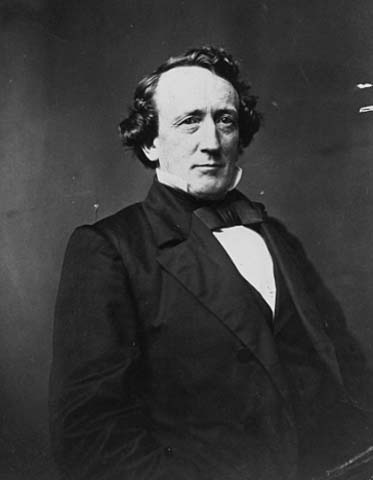
- Rice c. 1863

United States Senator from Minnesota
- In office May 11, 1858 – March 3, 1863
- Preceded by: Seat established
- Succeeded by: Alexander Ramsey

Delegate to the U.S. House of Representatives from the Minnesota Territory's at-large district
- In office March 4, 1853 – March 3, 1857
- Preceded by: Henry Sibley
- Succeeded by: William W. Kingsbury

Personal details
- Born: Henry Mower Rice; November 29, 1816 Waitsfield, Vermont, U.S.
- Died: January 15, 1894 (aged 77) San Antonio, Texas, U.S.
- Resting place: Oakland Cemetery, Saint Paul, Minnesota, U.S.
- Party: Democratic
- Spouse: Matilda Whital
- Children: 9

Henry Mower Rice (November 29, 1816 – January 15, 1894) was a fur trader and an American politician prominent in the statehood of Minnesota.

== Early life ==
Henry Rice was born on November 29, 1816, in Waitsfield, Vermont to Edmund Rice and Ellen (Durkee) Rice. Both Edmund and Ellen were of entirely English ancestry; their ancestors had been in New England since the early 1600s. Rice lived with family friends from an early age due to the death of his father.

When Rice was 18, he is said to have moved to Detroit, Michigan, but then to Kalamazoo in its early years and in 1837 participated in the surveying of the canal route around the rapids of Sault Ste. Marie between Lake Superior and Lake Huron.

In 1839 Rice secured a job at Fort Snelling, near what is now Minneapolis, Minnesota. He became sutler at the new Fort Atkinson adjacent to the new Winnebago Agency in northern Iowa and was also a fur trader with the Ho-Chunk and later the Chippewa (Ojibwe) Indians, apparently attaining a position of prominence and influence with some Winnebago leaders before their agreeing to the 1846 treaty. Rice developed trust among the Ojibwe of Minnesota and he was instrumental in negotiating the United States treaty with the Leech Lake and Fond du Lac Ojibwe Indians in 1847 by which they ceded land intended by the government for the Winnebago and other Wisconsin tribes.

== Political career ==
Rice lobbied for the bill to establish Minnesota Territory in 1849 and later served as its delegate to the 33rd and 34th Congresses from March 4, 1853, to March 4, 1857. He was involved in many entrepreneurial ventures in St. Paul's development, including land speculation, steamboats, and railroads. In 1854 Rice was tainted when his Minnesota railroad land grant bill was altered without authorization between the time of his submission of the bill and the printing of the text that the House passed. With the aid of Sen. Stephen A. Douglas, Sen. Rice's Minnesota Enabling Act bill passed in Congress on February 26, 1857, facilitating Minnesota's statehood.

Henry Rice was a leading Democrat in the wing of the Minnesota Democratic party sometimes referred to at the time as "Moccasin Democrats" because of his affiliation with the fur trade and the supplying of Indian Agency contracts. He and his one-time partner in the Indian trade Henry H. Sibley, also a Democrat, had a falling out in 1849 and thereafter were political rivals, Sibley being part of the non-Moccasin wing of the party.

Rice helped establish the St. Paul Chamber of Commerce, served as a member of the Board of Regents of the University of Minnesota from 1851 to 1859 and was a longtime president or board member of the Minnesota Historical Society.

H.M. Rice participated in official or unofficial capacities in a number of Indian treaties: the 1846 Winnebago treaty at Washington as a witness, the 1847 treaties with Ojibwe at Fond du Lac (Minn) and Leech Lake (Minn.) in an unofficial capacity, the 1854 treaty with Ojibwe at LaPointe (Wisc) as a witness, the Red Lake and Pembina Ojibwe in 1863 and 1864 as a witness, and as a United States Commissioner during 1887 – 1888, for an "agreement" with Ojibwe of Northern Minnesota, and is rumored to have influenced the secondary negotiations in Minnesota with the Dakota after the U.S. Senate revised the 1851 Dakota treaties of Mendota and Traverse des Sioux (Minnesota) and sent the rewritten treaties back to the Dakota for new signatures. He helped organize the Winnebago (Ho-Chunk) removal from the Neutral Ground (Iowa) in 1848 and received a federal contract to re-remove Winnebago in 1850 who had either not removed to Long Prairie (Minnesota Territory) or who had scattered to Wisconsin and Iowa. Documentation of these activities is in the federal United States Congressional Serial Set, newspapers such as the Minnesota Pioneer and the Prairie du Chien Patriot, and William Watts Folwell's A History of Minnesota (1921).

At statehood in 1858 Rice and James Shields were elected by the Minnesota legislature as Democrats to the United States Senate. Rice served from Minnesota's admittance on May 11, 1858, to March 4, 1863, in the 35th, 36th, and 37th Congresses. Rice had supported Southern initiatives during the Buchanan Presidency, but once the civil war had begun he became a supporter of the Union's war effort. He did not run for a second term as senator, Minnesota's legislature now being staunchly Republican. In the 1865, he was the Democratic nominee for Governor of Minnesota. Once nominated, Rice's campaign struggled to convince the public that he was loyal to the Union and had no confederate sympathies.

Generally Henry M. Rice lived with his wife and children in St. Paul thereafter, though he made many visits to Washington D.C. and Bayfield, Wisconsin. He died on January 15, 1894, while on a winter visit to San Antonio, Texas with his wife.

== Legacy ==
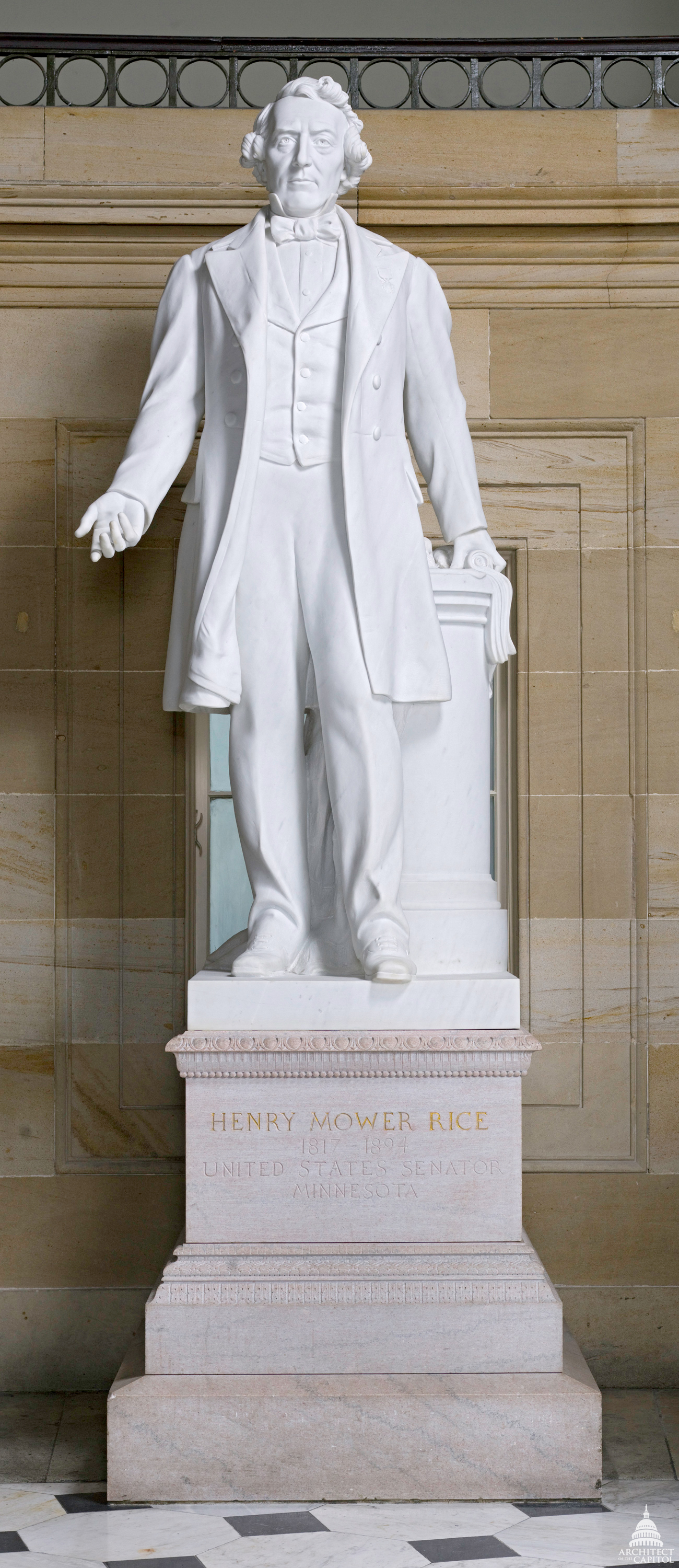
Statue of Henry Mower Rice in the National Statuary Hall of the U.S. Capitol building in Washington, D.C.

In 1916, the state of Minnesota donated a marble statue of Rice by Frederick Triebel to the National Statuary Hall Collection at the United States Capitol. Rice County, Minnesota is named for him. His brother Edmund Rice served in the U.S. House of Representatives.

An earlier, 1906, marble statue of Rice by Luella A. Varney Serrao was placed in the Minnesota State Capitol.

== Ancestry ==
Henry Mower Rice was a direct descendant of Edmund Rice, an early immigrant to Massachusetts Bay Colony, as follows:

- Henry Mower Rice, son of

- Edmund Rice (March 26, 1784 – May 27, 1829), son of
- Jedediah Rice (b. April 2, 1755), son of

- Ashur Rice (July 6, 1694 – August 20, 1773), son of
- Thomas Rice (June 30, 1654 – 1747), son of
- Thomas Rice (January 26, 1626 – 1682), son of

- Edmund Rice (1594 – May 3, 1663)

Henry Mower Rice married Matilda Whitall of Richmond, Virginia, in March 1849. They resided in St. Paul, Minnesota.

== See also ==
- List of United States senators expelled or censured

U.S. House of Representatives
| Preceded by Henry Sibley | Delegate to the U.S. House of Representatives from the Minnesota Territory's at-large congressional district 1853–1857 | Succeeded by William W. Kingsbury |
Party political offices
| Preceded by Henry T. Welles | Democratic nominee for Governor of Minnesota; 1865 | Succeeded by Charles Flandrau |
U.S. Senate
| New seat | U.S. Senator (Class 1) from Minnesota; 1858–1863; Served alongside: James Shields, Morton S. Wilkinson | Succeeded by Alexander Ramsey |
