= Edward John McClernand =

United States Army general

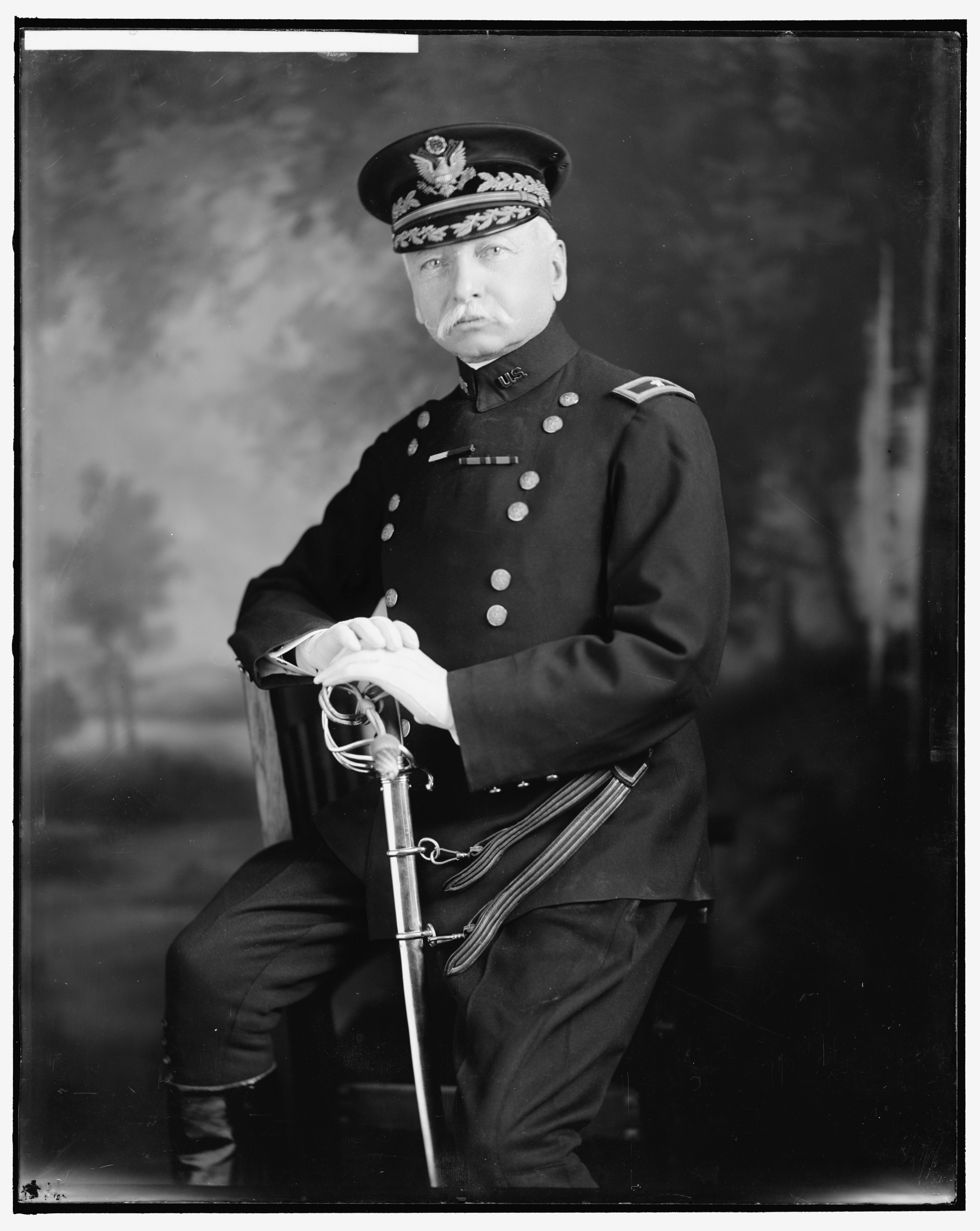
- Born: December 29, 1848; Jacksonville, Illinois, US
- Died: February 9, 1926 (aged 77); Easton, Pennsylvania, US
- Burial place: Arlington National Cemetery
- Military career
- Allegiance: United States
- Branch: United States Army
- Service years: 1870–1914
- Rank: Brigadier general
- Commands: 1st Cavalry Regiment
- Conflicts: American Indian Wars; Spanish–American War; Philippine–American War
- Awards: Medal of Honor

Edward John McClernand (December 29, 1848 – February 9, 1926) was a United States Army brigadier general who was a recipient of the Medal of Honor for valor in action near the Bear Paw Mountains, Montana on September 30, 1877. An 1870 graduate of West Point, his career spanned 42 years, as he served in the army until his retirement on December 29, 1912.

== Early life and the western frontier ==
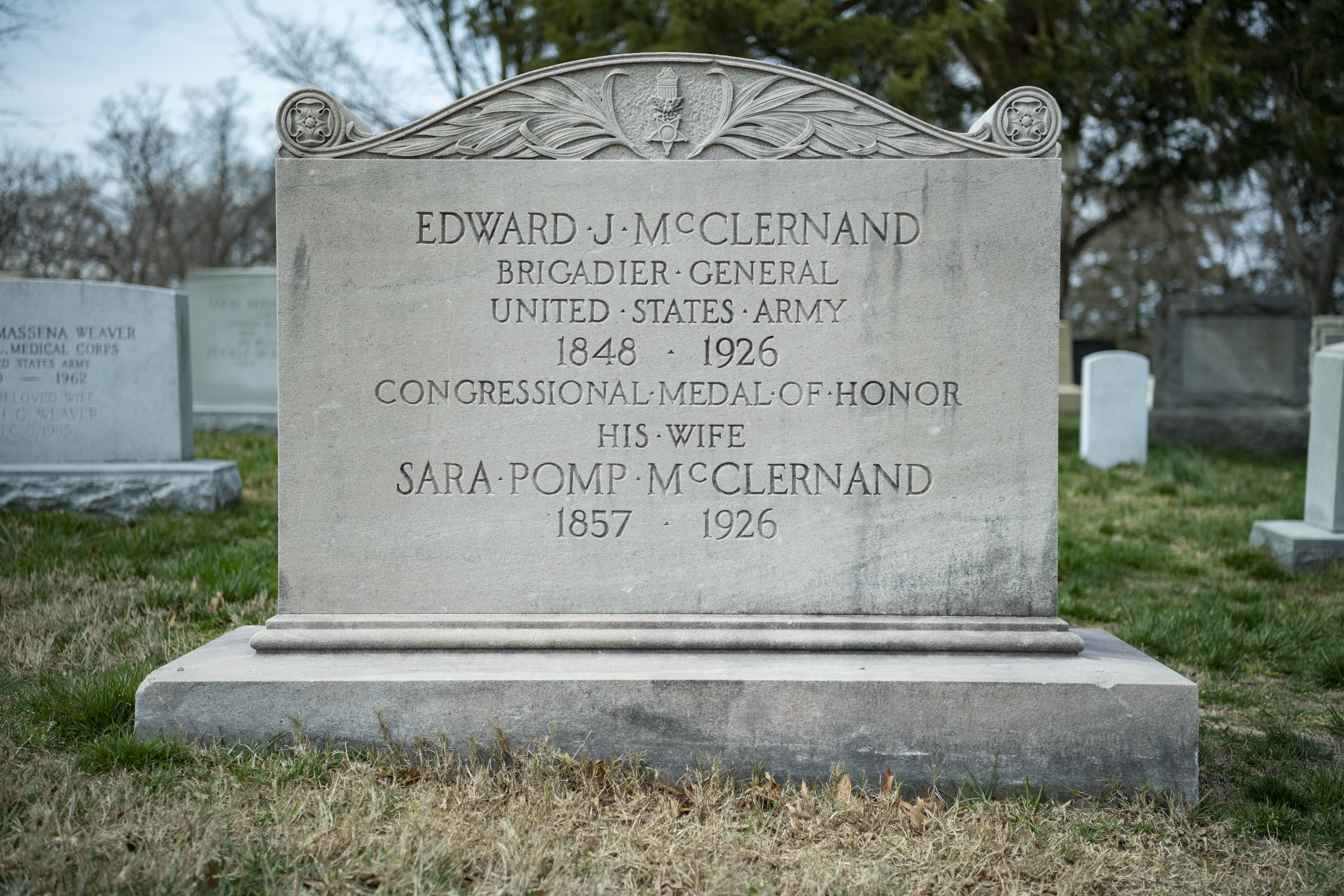
Grave at Arlington National Cemetery

Edward John McClernand was born in Jacksonville, Illinois, on December 29, 1848. He spent his early school years in Jacksonville and Springfield before graduating from West Point in 1870. His first assignment was to Ft. Ellis, Montana with the 2nd U.S. Cavalry in 1870, beginning nearly 30 years in various cavalry assignments primarily in the American West. His actions at Bear Paw Mountain, Montana on September 30, 1877, resulted in his being received the Medal of Honor on November 27, 1894. He returned to the east coast in 1879 as a Tactical Officer at West Point, returning to the frontier with assignments in Montana, California, and Washington starting in 1883.

== Medal of Honor citation ==
Rank and organization: Second Lieutenant, 2d U.S. Cavalry. Place and date: At Bear Paw Mountain, Mont., 30 September 1877. Entered service at: Springfield, Illinois. Birth: Jacksonville, Illinois. Date of issue: 27 November 1894.

Citation:

"Gallantly attacked a band of hostiles and conducted the combat with excellent skill and boldness."

== Later career ==
McClernand fought in the Spanish–American War, serving in the Santiago campaign. He later saw service in the Philippine Insurrection, commanding the 1st Cavalry Regiment. He was promoted to brigadier general shortly before he retired from active service on December 29, 1912. He was recalled to active duty the next day, serving as president of the Cavalry Board until 1914. He lived in Easton, Pennsylvania, where he wrote "With the Indians and the Buffalo in Montana", for the Cavalry Journal in 1925. He died on February 9, 1926, and was buried in Section 3, Lot 1931-SW of Arlington National Cemetery.

== Spanish-American War and the Cuban Occupation ==
In May 1898, McClernand joined 5th Corp under General Shafter as it prepared to leave for Cuba in May 1898. He served as Adjutant-General 5th Army Corpsthroughout the campaign of Santiago de Cuba, and at Montauk Point, Long Island until Oct. 3, 1898. He moved to Governor's Island, where he worked on arranging records of Santiago campaign, until Dec. 11, 1898. He served as Adjutant-General 2d Army Corps, at Augusta, Georgia from December 15, 1898 to May 1, 1899, and at Headquarters Mustering District, States of South Carolina, Georgia, and Alabama, until May 28, 1899. After a one month leave of absence he returned to Cuba to server as Adjutant-General for the Department of Matanzas and Santa Clara, Cuba, from July 6 to Aug. 16, 1899.

== Personal life ==
Edward John McClernand's father was Major General John Alexander McClernand, commander of the XIII Army Corps in the Civil War. His mother was Mrs. Sarah Dunlap McClernand. He married Ms. Sarah Pomp (1857–1926), who is buried along with him at Arlington.

He was a hereditary companion of the Military Order of the Loyal Legion of the United States.
