= Minnesota Territory's at-large congressional district =

Former US congressional district

- Obsolete district
- Created: 1849, as a non-voting delegate was granted by Congress
- Eliminated: 1858, as a result of statehood
- Years active: 1849–1858

Before statehood, Minnesota Territory sent a non-voting delegate to the United States House of Representatives.

== List of delegates representing the district ==
Delegate	Party	Years	Cong ress	Electoral history
District created March 3, 1849
Henry Hastings Sibley (Mendota)	Democratic	July 7, 1849 – March 3, 1853	31st 32nd	Elected in 1849 and seated December 3, 1849. Re-elected in 1850. Retired.
Henry Mower Rice (St. Paul)	Democratic	March 4, 1853 – March 3, 1857	33rd 34th	Elected in 1852. Re-elected in 1854. Retired.
William W. Kingsbury (Duluth)	Democratic	March 4, 1857 – May 11, 1858	35th	Elected in 1856. Retired when district eliminated.
District eliminated May 11, 1858

== Elimination upon statehood ==
The seat was eliminated after Minnesota was admitted to the Union. Western portions of the territory fell unorganized until re-organization in the Dakota Territory in 1861.
