= Thomas L. Harris =

American soldier and politician (1816–1858)

Thomas Langrell Harris
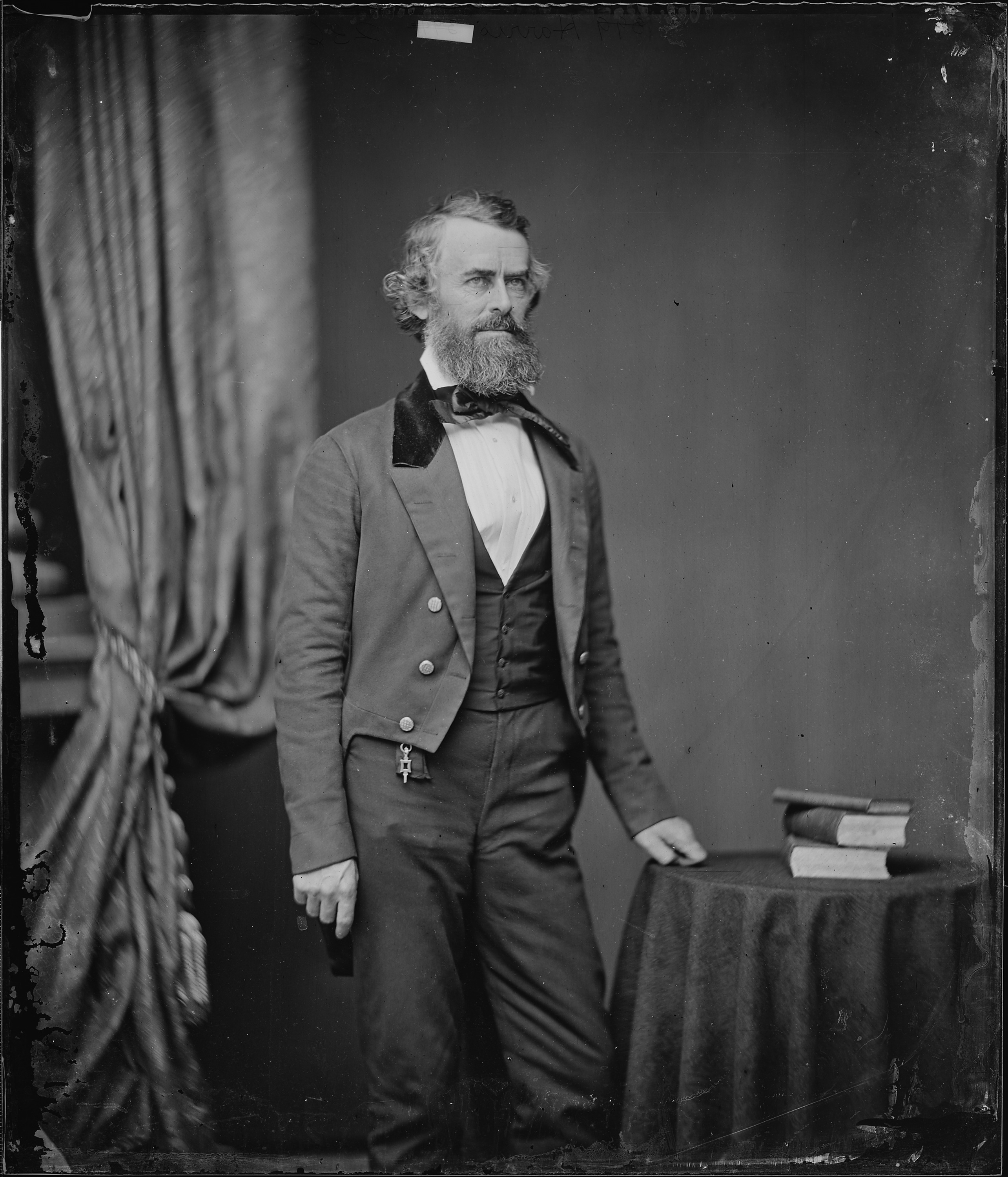
- Harris c. 1855–1858

Member of the U.S. House of Representatives from Illinois's 6th district
- In office March 4, 1855 – November 24, 1858
- Preceded by: John Alexander McClernand
- Succeeded by: Charles D. Hodges

Member of the U.S. House of Representatives from Illinois's 7th district
- In office March 4, 1849 – March 3, 1851
- Preceded by: Abraham Lincoln
- Succeeded by: Richard Yates

Personal details
- Born: October 20, 1816 Norwich, Connecticut, US
- Died: November 24, 1858 (aged 42) Springfield, Illinois, US
- Resting place: Rose Hill Cemetery, Petersburg, Illinois, US
- Party: Democratic
- Education: Washington College
- Occupation: Congressman, school commissioner
- Profession: Lawyer, politician
- Awards: Sword for gallantry by the State of Illinois.

Military service
- Allegiance: United States
- Branch/service: US Army
- Years of service: 1846–1847
- Rank: Major
- Unit: 4th Illinois Volunteer Infantry Regiment
- Battles/wars: Battle of Cerro Gordo

Thomas Langrell Harris (October 29, 1816 – November 24, 1858) was an American lawyer who was a soldier in the United States Army and U.S. representative from Illinois in the mid-19th century.

Harris was decorated for bravery at the Battle of Cerro Gordo during the Mexican–American War, and was a member of Congress as a Democrat.

== Early life ==
Born in Norwich, Connecticut, Harris pursued classical studies and was graduated from Washington (now Trinity) College, Hartford, Connecticut, in 1841 where he studied law. He was of Welsh descent.

=== Early career ===
He was admitted to the bar in 1842 and commenced practice in Petersburg, Illinois. He was made School commissioner for Menard County in 1845.

== Military service ==
During the Mexican–American War, he raised and commanded a company and joined the Fourth Regiment, Illinois Volunteer Infantry. Harris was subsequently elected major of the regiment. While absent and with the US Army, Harris was elected a member of the State senate in 1846. He was presented with a sword by the State of Illinois for gallantry at the Battle of Cerro Gordo, Mexico.

== Later political career ==
Harris was elected as a Democrat to the Thirty-first Congress (March 4, 1849 – March 3, 1851), succeeding future president Abraham Lincoln, who did not run for re-election after his one term in the House. Harris was an unsuccessful candidate for reelection in 1850 to the Thirty-second Congress.

He was not a candidate in 1852, but was elected to the Thirty-fourth Congress and Thirty-fifth Congresses and served from March 4, 1855, until his death. He served as chairman of the Committee on Expenditures in the Department of the Navy (Thirty-fourth Congress), Committee on Elections (Thirty-fifth Congress) and was re-elected to the Thirty-sixth Congress.

=== Legacy ===
Harristown Township, Macon County, Illinois and the Village of Harristown [formerly Summit] were named in his honor.

== Death ==
Harris died in Springfield, Illinois, November 24, 1858, and is interred in Rose Hill Cemetery, Petersburg, Illinois. He has a cenotaph at the Congressional Cemetery in Washington, DC, but is not buried there.

== See also ==
- List of members of the United States Congress who died in office (1790–1899)

U.S. House of Representatives
Preceded by Abraham Lincoln	Member of the U.S. House of Representatives from Illinois's 7th congressional district 1849–1851	Succeeded by Richard Yates
Preceded by John A. McClernand	Member of the U.S. House of Representatives from Illinois's 6th congressional district 1855–1858	Succeeded by James C. Allen
